= Phillip Fulmer =

American football player, coach, and athletic director (born 1950)

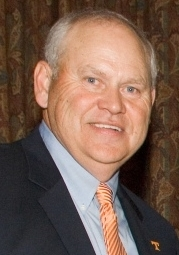

Biographical details
- Born: September 1, 1950 (age 76); Winchester, Tennessee, U.S.

Playing career
- 1968–1971: Tennessee
- Position: Guard

Coaching career (HC unless noted)
- 1972–1973: Tennessee (student coach)
- 1974–1978: Wichita State (OL/LB)
- 1979: Vanderbilt (OC/OL)
- 1980–1988: Tennessee (OL)
- 1989–1992: Tennessee (OC/OL)
- 1992–2008: Tennessee

Administrative career (AD unless noted)
- 2017–2021: Tennessee

Head coaching record
- Overall: 152–52
- Bowls: 8–7

Accomplishments and honors

Championships
- National (1998); 2 SEC (1997, 1998); 6 SEC East Division (1997, 1998, 2001, 2003, 2004, 2007)

Awards
- AFCA Coach of the Year (1998); Eddie Robinson Coach of the Year (1998); George Munger Award (1998); Home Depot Coach of the Year Award (1998); Sporting News College Football COY (1998); SEC Coach of the Year (1998)
- College Football Hall of Fame; Inducted in 2012 (profile)

Phillip Edward Fulmer Sr. (born September 1, 1950) is an American former football player, coach, and athletic director at the University of Tennessee. He served as head coach of the Tennessee Volunteers football team from 1992 to 2008, compiling a 152–52 record. He is best known for coaching the Volunteers in the first BCS National Championship Game in 1998, defeating the Florida State Seminoles. Fulmer was the Volunteers' 22nd head football coach.

At the end of his tenure at Tennessee, Fulmer had the second-highest number of wins of any head coach in Tennessee history, 21 behind Robert Neyland. Fulmer also was the third coach in Tennessee history to win a claimed national championship. His 1997 and 1998 teams won consecutive SEC championships. Despite a decline in the later years of his career, he is considered to be an icon of Tennessee football, noted for his loyalty to the institution. In recognition of his accomplishments at Tennessee, Fulmer was inducted into the College Football Hall of Fame in 2012.

Fulmer served as a special assistant to the athletic director at East Tennessee State University. On June 20, 2017, Fulmer was named as a special advisor to the University of Tennessee president. On December 1, 2017, Fulmer became the athletic director at the University of Tennessee, a position he held until his retirement in 2021.

== Playing career ==
Fulmer was born in Winchester, Tennessee, where he attended Franklin County High School. While at Franklin, Fulmer played football and starred for the Rebels. Fulmer enrolled at the University of Tennessee as a student in 1968. He promptly joined the football team as an offensive guard and would later be named as a co-captain. While playing for the Volunteers, Fulmer contributed to Tennessee's 30–5 record from 1969 to 1971, where he played for head coaches Doug Dickey (who returned to Tennessee as athletic director and hired Fulmer as the Volunteers' coach) and Bill Battle. The Volunteers captured the SEC championship with a 9–2 record in 1969, went 11–1 and won the Sugar Bowl in 1970, and finished as Liberty Bowl champions with a 10–2 record in 1971.

== Early coaching career ==
Fulmer served as linebacker coach and defensive coordinator for the Vols freshman team in 1973 before moving to Wichita State University the following season. He spent five years at Wichita State, where he coached the offensive line in 1974 and 1977–1978 and served as linebacker coach in 1975–1976. He followed those years with a one-season stint at Vanderbilt, serving as an assistant to Commodores head coach George MacIntyre.

== University of Tennessee ==
Beginning in 1980, Fulmer served 13 years as a Vols assistant coach, initially as the offensive line coach, and then as the offensive coordinator and offensive line coach. Linemen coached by Fulmer during this period include Bill Mayo, Raleigh McKenzie, Bruce Wilkerson, Harry Galbreath, Charles McRae, Antone Davis, and Tom Myslinski.

=== 1992 season ===
Johnny Majors was the coach of the Volunteers going into the 1992 season. However, a couple of weeks before the first game, Majors underwent quintuple-bypass heart surgery. Fulmer took over the role as interim head coach with Heath Shuler as his quarterback. Fulmer helped lead the team to a 3–0 start with a 38–3 victory over Southwestern Louisiana, a 34–31 victory over #14 Georgia, and a 31–14 victory over #4 Florida. Majors returned for the Cincinnati game, a 40–0 victory, and the LSU game, a 20–0 victory. However, the Vols dropped their next three games, a 25–24 loss to Arkansas, a 17–10 loss to #4 Alabama, and a 24–23 loss to South Carolina. Among growing dissent among the fanbase, Majors resigned due to his contract being bought out and Fulmer became the 20th head football coach in Tennessee history at the end of the season. The team recorded three wins, a 26–21 victory over Memphis, a 34–13 victory over Kentucky, a 29–25 victory over Vanderbilt to close out the regular season. The team recorded a 38–23 victory over #16 Boston College in the Hall of Fame Bowl to finish with a 9–3 record and a #12 ranking in the AP Poll.

=== 1993 season ===
Going into his first full season as the Vols' head coach, Fulmer's Vols were ranked #10 going into the season opener against Louisiana Tech. On September 4, the Vols defeated the Bulldogs by a score of 50–0. The next week, the Vols defeated the #22 Georgia Bulldogs by a score of 38–6. The first setback came in the next game against #9 Florida, a 41–34 loss in The Swamp. The Vols won their next three games, a 42–20 victory over LSU, a 52–19 victory over Duke, and a 28–14 victory over Arkansas to move to a 5–1 record. The next game, against #3 Alabama, was a rare 17–17 tie. Fulmer led the team to victories in the next four games against South Carolina, #13 Louisville, Kentucky, and Vanderbilt to finish the regular season with a 9–1–1 record. In the Citrus Bowl against #13 Penn State, the Volunteers fell 31–13 to finish Heath Shuler's final season with a 9–2–1 record and #12 in the AP Poll.

=== 1994 season ===
Going into the 1994 season, Fulmer's Vols were the preseason #13 team. The season started off with a 25–23 loss to UCLA, the first season-opening loss of Fulmer's head coaching career. The Vols got their first win, a 41–23 win over the #23 Georgia Bulldogs, in the next game. The Vols faced a tough task in the next game against #1 Florida and fell 31–0. The Vols' struggles continued in the next game, a 24–21 loss to Mississippi State to fall to 1–3 and unranked for the first time with Fulmer at the helm. However, despite the loss, Fulmer had a young Peyton Manning as his quarterback due to injuries of previous starters Jerry Colquitt and Todd Helton. The Vols won their next two games, a 10–9 victory over #17 Washington State and a 38–21 victory over Arkansas to get to 3–3 on the season. A rough 17–13 loss to #10 Alabama followed before a four-game winning streak, which included a 52–0 victory over Kentucky and a 65–0 victory over Vanderbilt to close out the season brought the Vols to a 7–4 record and a bowl game. The Vols faced off against #17 Virginia Tech in the Gator Bowl and defeated them 45–23. The Vols finished 8–4 and #22 in the AP Poll despite their rough start to the season.

=== 1995 season ===
The Volunteers started the season with a #8 ranking, the highest to start a season under Fulmer to that point. The season started with back-to-back victories over East Carolina (27–7) and Georgia (30–27). The Vols suffered their first setback in a 62–37 defeat to #4 Florida. Fulmer led the team to eight straight victories to close out the regular season. In the winning streak was Fulmer's first victory over Alabama, a 41–14 win in Birmingham, Alabama. With a 10–1 record, the Vols played #4 Ohio State in the Citrus Bowl and defeated the Buckeyes by a score of 20–14. The Vols finished with an 11–1 record and #3 in the final AP Poll for their best finish with Fulmer to that point.

=== 1996 season ===
The Vols started the 1996 season ranked #2 in the nation. Fulmer led the team to two victories over UNLV (62–3) and UCLA (35–20) to start the season. Similar to the previous season, the Vols' first setback came to the #4 Florida Gators, this time by a score of 35–29. The Vols rolled off four straight victories, including another victory for Fulmer over #7 Alabama. The Vols faced Memphis and were shocked by the Tigers by a score of 21–17. To close out the regular season, the Vols ran the table to finish 9–2. They faced the Northwestern Wildcats in the Citrus Bowl and won 48–28 to finish 10–2 and #9 in the final AP Poll. Fulmer led the team to consecutive 10-win seasons for the first time since 1971–1972 under Bill Battle.

=== 1997 season ===
Fulmer's Vols started the 1997 season #5 in the nation and eventually finished in uncharted territory. With Peyton Manning, the Vols started with two victories over Texas Tech (52–17) and UCLA (30–24). Once again, the #3 Florida Gators defeated the Vols 33–20 for the first setback of the year. The Volunteers did recover from the defeat and won out in the regular season to finish with a 10–1 record. The Volunteers qualified for the SEC Championship, facing off against the Auburn Tigers, and won 30–29 for their first conference championship since 1990. The Vols played in the Orange Bowl against No. 2 Nebraska with a potential national championship at stake. However, the Vols fell 42–17 and finished with an 11–2 record and #7 in the final AP Poll. Despite the disappointing ending, Fulmer had brought the Volunteers to and sustained national prominence, and greater things were on the horizon.

=== 1998 season: national championship ===
Due to the loss of Peyton Manning to the NFL, the Vols might not have been as respected going into the 1998 season. However, Fulmer had a new quarterback ready to go in Tee Martin. The season started with a close 34–33 victory over the Donovan McNabb-led Syracuse Orangemen. Two weeks later, after years of defeat, the Vols finally overcame the #2 Florida Gators in a 20–17 overtime victory. The following game was a 42–7 victory over Houston. On October 3, the Vols survived a close game with the Auburn Tigers by a score of 17–9. Against the #7 Georgia Bulldogs in the next game, the Vols won 22–3. Fulmer continued his winning streak over Alabama with a 35–18 victory. After two more wins against South Carolina and UAB, the top-ranked Vols faced off against #10 Arkansas. The Vols escaped with a 28–24 victory after recovering a late fumble by the Razorbacks to get the go-ahead score. The Vols closed out the regular season undefeated with wins over Kentucky and Vanderbilt. In the SEC Championship, the Vols defeated the #23 Mississippi State Bulldogs by a score of 24–14. The Vols made the BCS National Championship game and faced off against the #2 Florida State Seminoles in the 1999 Fiesta Bowl. The Vols defeated the Seminoles by a score of 23–16. With the victory, the Volunteers won their first National Championship since 1967. Fulmer's senior class of the 1998 team compiled a record of 45–5, losing only to Florida (three times), Nebraska, and Memphis. As a result of the 1998 season, Fulmer was named National Coach of the Year and SEC Coach of the Year.

=== 1999 season ===
Fresh off the National Championship, Fulmer's Vols started the season as the #2 team in the country. After a 42–17 victory against the Wyoming Cowboys, the Vols dropped a game to the #4 Florida Gators by a score of 23–21. The Vols then won their next six games including another victory over #10 Alabama and a 38–14 victory over Notre Dame. On November 13, the Vols lost 28–24 to Arkansas before closing out the regular season with two wins to finish 9–2. In the Fiesta Bowl, the Vols lost 31–21 to #3 Nebraska. Fulmer's streak of 10-win seasons was snapped, but the Vols finished #9 in the nation going into 2000. Fulmer was honored with the State Farm Eddie Robinson Coach of Distinction Award in December 1999.

=== 2000 season ===
The 2000 season brought Fulmer and the Vols some struggles early on in the season. The season started off with a narrow victory 19–16 victory over #22 Southern Miss. After the game, the City of Knoxville proclaimed September 9, 2000, as "Phillip Fulmer Day" in honor of the coach. However, the Vols lost the next game 27–23 to #6 Florida. After a 70–3 victory over Louisiana–Monroe, the Vols dropped their next two games to LSU by a score of 38–31 and #19 Georgia by a score of 21–10 to drop to 2–3 and unranked for the first time in several years under Fulmer. The Vols recovered and won their next six games, which included a 20–10 victory over Alabama and a 17–14 victory over #17 South Carolina, to finish with an 8–3 record and qualified for a bowl game. In the Cotton Bowl against Kansas State, the Vols fell 35–21 and finished unranked for the first time under Fulmer.

=== 2001 season ===
Despite the disappointing ending to the 2000 season, the Vols started the 2001 season ranked #8 in the nation. The Vols started the season off with two wins over Syracuse (33–9) and Arkansas (13–3). Due to the 9/11 terrorist attacks, the Florida game had to be moved to later in the season. The Vols faced off against #14 LSU without having played in three weeks. The Vols won 26–18 to move Fulmer to 3–0 on the season. The Vols suffered their first setback against Georgia in the next game, a 26–24 loss. The Vols followed the loss with a six-game winning streak to move to #5 in the nation and faced off with the #2 Florida Gators on December 1. The Vols won a close game against their rivals, 34–32, to go up against #21 LSU in the SEC Championship. The Vols controlled their own destiny in the National Championship race, but fell 31–20 to the Nick Saban-led Tigers. In the Citrus Bowl against #17 Michigan, the Vols won 45–17 to finish 11–2 and #4 in the country in the AP Poll. In 2001, Fulmer has named to the Tennessee Sports Hall of Fame.

=== 2002 season ===
Fulmer and the Vols had high expectations as a result of their #5 ranking to start the 2002 season. However, the season was inconsistent for the Vols. After two wins against Wyoming and Middle Tennessee State, the Vols dropped a game to the Florida Gators by a score of 30–13. After two victories over Rutgers and Arkansas, the Vols dropped two games to #6 Georgia and #19 Alabama. The unranked Vols finished out the season with a 3–1 stretch to make a bowl game against Maryland in the 2002 Peach Bowl. The Vols fell to the Terrapins by a score of 30–3 and finished with an 8–5 record.

=== 2003 season ===
Fulmer's Vols came into the 2003 season with a #14 ranking. The Vols started off the season with four straight victories to move to #8 in the country going into the Auburn game. The Vols fell to the Tigers 28–21 for their first setback. The Vols dropped the next game to #8 Georgia by a score of 41–14. The Vols won their next six games, including a 5OT 51–43 victory over Alabama, to finish with a 10–2 record. In the 2004 Peach Bowl against Clemson, the Vols fell 27–14 to finish 10–3 and #15 in the final AP Poll.

=== 2004 season ===
Fulmer's Vols started the 2004 season #14 in the country. The Vols started off 3–0, including a 30–28 victory over the #11 Florida Gators in the last matchup with Gator head coach Ron Zook. The Vols lost the next game against the #8 Auburn Tigers by a score of 34–10 before winning four straight, including a 19–14 over #3 Georgia. On November 6, the Vols lost to Notre Dame by a score of 17–13 before winning out to finish 9–2. In a rematch with the #3 Auburn Tigers in the SEC Championship, the Vols fell 38–28. In the 2005 Cotton Bowl against #22 Texas A&M, Fulmer led the Vols to a 38–7 victory to finish 10–3 and 13th in the final AP Poll.

=== 2005 season ===
In 2005, Fulmer's pre-season #3 Volunteers had very high expectations. However, for the first time in his tenure, Fulmer's Volunteers struggled mightily by the standards that were established. After a close 17–10 victory over UAB, the Vols fell to the #6 Florida by a score of 16–7. After a 30–27 victory over #3 LSU and a 27–10 victory over Ole Miss, the Vols lost four straight games to stand at 3–5. The Vols ended up 5–6, losing to in-state SEC rival Vanderbilt for the first time in his 14-year tenure. The losing season also kept Tennessee out of a bowl game for the first time since 1988, a streak of 16 years, which was the third-longest in the NCAA.

=== 2006 season ===
Despite their abysmal finish to the 2005 season, Fulmer's Vols started the 2006 season ranked #23. The team started with two straight wins over #9 California and Air Force before dropping a game to #7 Florida Gators by score of 21–20. The Vols reeled off five straight wins before dropping two games to #13 LSU and #11 Arkansas. The Vols won their last two regular season games to finish 9–3 and face Penn State in the 2007 Outback Bowl. The Vols fell to the Nittany Lions by a score of 20–10 to finish 9–4 and #25 in the final poll.

=== 2007 season ===
Fulmer's Vols started the season ranked #15. The Vols dropped their opening game to the #12 California Golden Bears by a score of 45–31. After a 39–19 win over Southern Miss, the Vols dropped a game to #5 Florida Gators by a score of 59–20. They won their next three games, a 48–27 victory over Arkansas State, a 35–14 upset against #12 Georgia, and a 33–21 victory over Mississippi State. The next week, Tennessee suffered a setback in a 41–17 loss to Alabama. Tennessee went on a five-game winning streak to close out the season, which included a 27–24 victory over #15 South Carolina. The Vols finished with a 9–3 record, won the SEC East, and qualified for the SEC Championship. Against #5 LSU, the Vols fell 21–14. In the 2008 Outback Bowl against Wisconsin, the Vols won 21–17 to finish 10–4 and #12 in the final AP Poll.

=== 2008 season ===
The Vols started the 2008 season as #18 in the country. The team dropped their season opener to UCLA by a score of 27–24 in overtime and fell out of the rankings. In the next game, the Vols got their first victory of the a season, a 35–3 result against UAB. Tennessee dropped their next two games against #4 Florida by a score of 30–6 and #15 Auburn by a score of 14–12. After a narrow 13–9 victory over Northern Illinois, the Vols dropped a game by a score of 26–14 to #10 Georgia. The Vols recorded their first conference win in the next game against Mississippi State 34–3 before dropping a 29–9 result to #2 Alabama and a 27–6 result to South Carolina to fall to 3–6. After the 3–6 start, Fulmer came under increased scrutiny from Tennessee fans, leaving skepticism about how long he would remain Tennessee's head football coach despite having just received a contract extension after the 2007 season. Tennessee athletic director Mike Hamilton finally notified Fulmer of his dismissal on November 2, 2008. The next day, he agreed to step down as head coach following the season. That week, the Vols suffered a loss at the hands of Wyoming, a 26-point underdog. Fulmer completed his long tenure at the University of Tennessee with a 28–10 win over Kentucky on November 29, 2008.

Lane Kiffin was hired by Mike Hamilton to succeed Fulmer as the head coach of the Tennessee Volunteers.

=== Legacy ===
Fulmer had a reputation as an ace recruiter, leading many analysts to praise him as one of the game's top head coach recruiters. Despite his decline over the last several years of his career, Fulmer's winning percentage was still among the top in the country for head coaches who had over ten years' experience.

After winning the National Championship in 1998, a street near Neyland Stadium was renamed "Phillip Fulmer Way".

During Fulmer's tenure, Tennessee had a seven-game winning streak over longtime rival Alabama from 1995 to 2001. The winning streak marked the longest for a Tennessee coach in the Third Saturday in October.

Fulmer never lost to the Kentucky Wildcats, winning 17 straight games.

== Post-coaching career ==
Fulmer was a sports analyst on CBS's SEC Postgame Show, as well as various programming on the CBS College Sports Network.

Fulmer was a strong candidate for the University of Louisville head coaching job. He stated in many interviews that he was interested in the job and had a phone interview with Louisville athletic director Tom Jurich. However, the job was eventually offered to Charlie Strong. After UConn head coach Randy Edsall left for Maryland in January 2011, sources confirmed that Fulmer expressed interest in the coaching vacancy at Connecticut. After Mike Hamilton stepped down as University of Tennessee athletic director, Fulmer was frequently brought up by Tennessee fans as a potential replacement, but said that he did not consider himself a likely candidate.

Fulmer appeared as himself in the 2009 biographical sports drama film The Blind Side.

On May 15, 2012, Fulmer was inducted into the College Football Hall of Fame.

Fulmer served as a consultant and special assistant to athletic director Richard Sander at East Tennessee State University, which relaunched a football program it had shut down for financial reasons in 2003.

Fulmer became a founding partner at BPV Capital Management in Knoxville. He serves as part of the business development team.

On June 20, 2017, it was announced that Fulmer will serve as a special advisor to the University of Tennessee president.

On December 1, 2017, following the suspension of John Currie, the previous athletic director at the University of Tennessee, Fulmer was named the new athletic director for the university. In April 2018, Fulmer signed a four-year contract extension. In 2018, Fulmer was able to achieve getting the University of Tennessee to #35 in the NACDA Directors' Cup. In 2019, he helped improve Tennessee's standing to #25, their best finish since 2011. Fulmer retired as athletic director in 2021.

In 2018, Fulmer was named to the 2018 SEC Legends Class, honored at that year's SEC Championship game.

In 2019, Fulmer was named East Tennessean of the Year by the East Tennessee Historical Society.

In December 2019, Fulmer was named to ESPN's list of their top 150 college football coaches to celebrate the 150th anniversary of the sport. He was named #94.

In 2025, Fulmer was honored by the University of Tennessee at the new Championship Corner located at Neyland Stadium.

== Family ==
Fulmer and his wife have three daughters. In addition, Fulmer has a son.

== Head coaching record ==
Year	Team	Overall	Conference	Standing	Bowl/playoffs	Coaches^{#}	AP^{°}
Tennessee Volunteers (Southeastern Conference) (1992–2008)
1992	Tennessee	4–0*	2–0*	3rd (Eastern)*	W Hall of Fame	12	12
1993	Tennessee	9–2–1	6–1–1	2nd (Eastern)	L Florida Citrus	11	12
1994	Tennessee	8–4	5–3	2nd (Eastern)	W Gator^{†}	18	22
1995	Tennessee	11–1	7–1	2nd (Eastern)	W Florida Citrus	2	3
1996	Tennessee	10–2	7–1	2nd (Eastern)	W Florida Citrus	9	9
1997	Tennessee	11–2	7–1	1st (Eastern)	L Orange^{†}	8	7
1998	Tennessee	13–0	8–0	1st (Eastern)	W Fiesta^{†}	1	1
1999	Tennessee	9–3	6–2	2nd (Eastern)	L Fiesta^{†}	9	9
2000	Tennessee	8–4	5–3	2nd (Eastern)	L Cotton	25	
2001	Tennessee	11–2	7–2	1st (Eastern)	W Florida Citrus	4	4
2002	Tennessee	8–5	5–3	3rd (Eastern)	L Peach		
2003	Tennessee	10–3	6–2	T–1st (Eastern)	L Peach	16	15
2004	Tennessee	10–3	7–1	1st (Eastern)	W Cotton	15	13
2005	Tennessee	5–6	3–5	4th (Eastern)			
2006	Tennessee	9–4	5–3	2nd (Eastern)	L Outback	23	25
2007	Tennessee	10–4	6–3	T–1st (Eastern)	W Outback	12	12
2008	Tennessee	5–7	3–5	5th (Eastern)			
Tennessee:		151–52–1	91–35–1				
Total:		152–52					
National championship Conference title Conference division title or championship game berth
^{†}Indicates Bowl Coalition, Bowl Alliance or BCS bowl.; ^{#}Rankings from final Coaches Poll.; ^{°}Rankings from final AP Poll.

*Fulmer served as interim coach for the first three games of the 1992 season while Johnny Majors recovered from heart surgery. He was named full-time coach after the 1992 season, and led the team in the 1993 Hall of Fame Bowl. Tennessee credits the first three games of the 1992 regular season and the Hall of Fame Bowl to Fulmer, and the eight games in between to Majors.
^Fulmer's 1993 Tennessee team finished 9–2–1 (6–1–1), but Alabama subsequently forfeited the tie to Tennessee.

== See also ==
- List of College Football Hall of Fame inductees (coaches)
- List of NCAA Division I athletic directors
- List of Tennessee Volunteers head football coaches
- List of presidents of the American Football Coaches Association
