= 1994 Gator Bowl =

1994 Outback Gator Bowl
- 50th Gator Bowl
- Outback Gator Bowl logo
Tennessee Volunteers	Virginia Tech Hokies
(7–4)	(8–3)
SEC	Big East
45	23
Head coach: Phillip Fulmer	Head coach: Frank Beamer
AP / Coaches / BC; NR / 24 / NR	AP / Coaches / BC; 17 / 15 / 16
	1	2	3	4	Total
Tennessee	14	21	0	10	45
Virginia Tech	0	10	6	7	23
- Date: December 30, 1994
- Season: 1994
- Stadium: Ben Hill Griffin Stadium
- Location: Gainesville, Florida
- MVP: RB James Stewart, Tennessee; QB Maurice DeShazo, Va. Tech
- Favorite: Tennessee by 7
- Referee: Mike Pereira (WAC)
- Attendance: 62,200

United States TV coverage
- Network: TBS
- Announcers: Gary Bender, Pat Haden, Craig Sager

The 1994 Gator Bowl was an American college football bowl game between the Tennessee Volunteers and the Virginia Tech Hokies at Ben Hill Griffin Stadium in Gainesville, Florida, on December 30, 1994. The game was the final contest of the 1994 NCAA Division I-A football season for both teams, and ended in a 45–23 victory for Tennessee.

The 1994 Gator Bowl saw Tennessee face off against regional rival 17th-ranked Virginia Tech at Ben Hill Griffin Stadium on the campus of the University of Florida. The game was moved to Gainesville in 1994 due to renovations to the Gator Bowl for the Jacksonville Jaguars. The Tennessee Volunteers came entered the game with a regular-season record of 7–4 under head coach Phillip Fulmer that included a 5–3 record in Southeastern Conference competition. Virginia Tech came into the game with an 8–3 regular-season record that included a record of 5–2 in Big East Conference competition.

The game kicked off at 8:00 PM. From the start, Tennessee's high-scoring offense dominated. The Volunteers scored two touchdowns in the first quarter and three in the second, while Virginia Tech was able to muster a lone touchdown and field goal in the second quarter. At halftime, Tennessee had a commanding 35–10 lead, behind the strong play of Freshman QB Peyton Manning.

The Hokies struggled back in the third quarter, scoring six unanswered points to close the score to 35–16. In the fourth quarter, however, Tennessee answered Virginia Tech's effort with 10 points, putting the game out of reach for the Hokies, who managed only a single touchdown in the fourth quarter. The Hokies fumbled the ball five times—losing it once—and threw two interceptions, allowing Tennessee to cruise to an easy victory, 45–23. Tennessee running back James Stewart was named the game's most valuable player.

== Renovations ==
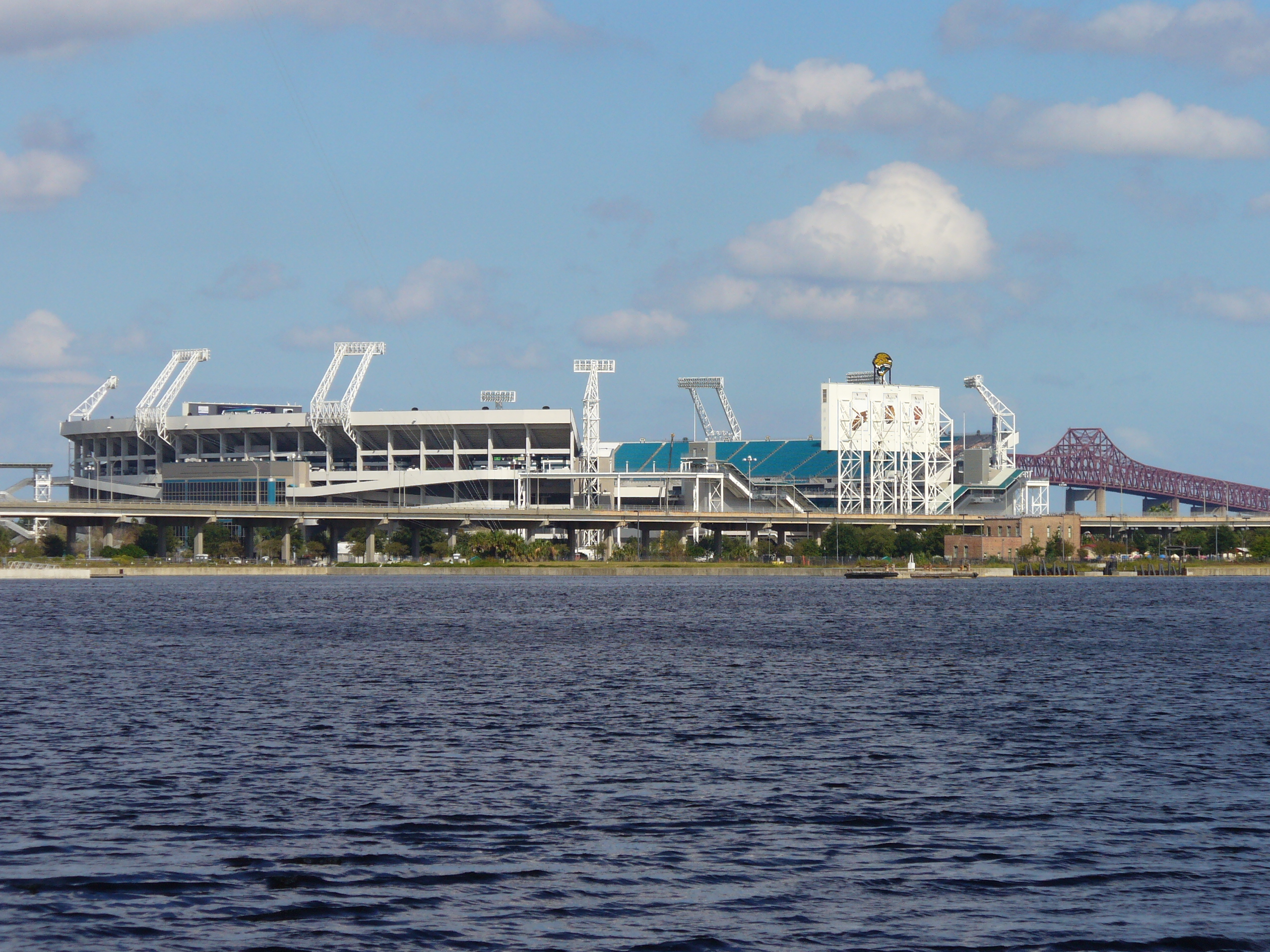
Jacksonville Municipal Stadium was under construction during 1994, forcing the 1994 Gator Bowl to find a different site.

In early 1994, Jacksonville Mayor Ed Austin proposed $49 million in renovations to Jacksonville's aging Gator Bowl Stadium in order to keep the stadium up to date for the annual Florida-Georgia rivalry game. After Florida and Georgia accepted the renovations, agreeing to play the rivalry game in Athens, Georgia during the renovations, Jacksonville investors proposed expanding the renovation plan in order to attract a National Football League team. The price tag was revised upward—to $121 million—and the city successfully attracted a team. Shortly after Jacksonville was awarded its new franchise—the Jacksonville Jaguars—the final plans were unveiled. The stadium would have additional luxury boxes, expanded seating, and upgraded facilities for teams and fans.

The renovations were much more extensive than had initially been proposed, and required more time to be completed. Instead of beginning in early 1995, work would have to begin in 1994, leaving the site of the 1994 Gator Bowl (played on Dec. 30) in doubt. By the end of January 1994, as the Gator Bowl was being demolished, that doubt was also demolished when a deal was struck to host the Gator Bowl at the University of Florida, in that school's Ben Hill Griffin Stadium. The game's title sponsor, Outback Steakhouse, and its television sponsor, TBS, would remain constant, and both were in their final year of contracts with the Gator Bowl.

== Team selection ==
Prior to the start of the 1994–95 college football season, the Gator Bowl was snubbed by the newly formed Bowl Alliance, a group of football conferences, bowl games, and television networks created to match up the No. 1 and No. 2 college football teams at the conclusion of each season. Though the Gator Bowl offered to pay $115 million for the right to become a Bowl Alliance game, the Orange Bowl was selected in place of the Gator Bowl. This event had repercussions at the end of the season, when the bowl was passed over by high-ranked teams that elected to accept bids to bowls in the new Bowl Alliance.

=== Tennessee ===
The Tennessee Volunteers had finished the 1993 season with a 10–2 record and a season-ending loss to the Penn State Nittany Lions under first-year head coach Phillip Fulmer in the Citrus Bowl. Hopes were high that Tennessee's second year under Fulmer's command would end better than its first.

Tennessee was ranked No. 13 in the Associated Press preseason poll at the start of the season, but won just one game in its first four of the season, causing the Volunteers to drop out of the top 25 for the first time since 1989, breaking a streak of 84 consecutive weeks in the poll. To make matters worse, Tennessee's two starting quarterbacks suffered season-ending injuries during that four-game span. In the Volunteers' season-opener against UCLA, Jerry Colquitt suffered a knee injury. Backup quarterback Todd Helton was hurt in the fourth game of the season, a loss to Mississippi State. In response to the poor start, Fulmer overhauled his defense and coped with the loss of his first- and second-string quarterbacks by bringing in acclaimed freshman Peyton Manning, son of National Football League star Archie Manning.

Manning's first start, a Tennessee homecoming game against Washington State, resulted in a 10–9 win. Things got progressively better for the Volunteers after Manning assumed the starting role, as they won six of their final seven regular-season games. The sole loss was a 13–17 defeat at the hands of then-No. 10 Alabama in Knoxville. The loss was merely a bump in the road, however, as Tennessee won all four regular-season games that followed, ending the regular season with a 65–0 drubbing of in-state rival Vanderbilt. In response to Fulmer's success at turning the team around from a slow start, he was awarded with a one-year contract extension by the university.

=== Virginia Tech ===
During the annual preseason poll of media members covering the Big East conference, Virginia Tech was picked to finish second among Big East teams, behind only Miami. The Hokies entered the 1994 college football season having finished the 1993 season with a win in the 1993 Independence Bowl, and hopes were high that they would return to a bowl game again in 1994.

The Hokies started the season well, winning their first four games in succession and culminating with a victory against West Virginia in the annual battle for the Black Diamond Trophy. The Hokies, who had begun the season ranked No. 21 in the country, rose to No. 14 by their fifth game of the season, a trip to Syracuse, New York, to play the Syracuse Orange. There, Virginia Tech suffered its first loss of the season, permitting 100-yard rushing games from Syracuse's Malcolm Thomas and Kirby Dar Dar, the last time the Hokies allowed two hundred-yard rushers in the same game. Tech responded to the loss by reeling off another three wins in succession. That winning streak ended at No. 6 Miami, when Tech lost its second game of the season, a loss that was followed by a season-ending defeat to perennial rival Virginia. The Hokies concluded the regular season with an 8–4 record overall and a 5–2 record in the Big East. Ironically, despite their season-ending loss to Virginia, the Hokies were awarded an invitation to the Gator Bowl over the Cavaliers, who lost to North Carolina State in their season-ending game. In addition to that loss, Gator Bowl officials later stated they were reluctant to invite an Atlantic Coast Conference team for a fourth straight year, thus opening the door for the Hokies from the Big East.

== Pregame buildup ==
The matchup of Virginia Tech and Tennessee was the first game between the two teams since 1937, an unusual fact since both teams are located in the Appalachian Mountains and the two schools are just 3.5 hours by car apart. This proximity generated multiple news stories about towns lying between the two schools and the divided loyalties of their fans. In Washington County, Virginia, which lies along the Tennessee border, the county supervisor—a Virginia Tech graduate—proclaimed the week of the Gator Bowl to be "Hokie Week" over the objections of the county attorney, who graduated from Tennessee. This natural rivalry was amplified by a basketball game held the day prior to the Gator Bowl that pitted the two schools' varsity teams against each other. In exchange for participating in the game, each team received $1.5 million from the Gator Bowl Association.

Ticket sales were brisk in the month between the announcement of the Tech-Tennessee matchup and the day of the game. By December 14, two weeks after the initial announcement, Virginia Tech had sold 16,000 tickets to Tennessee's 9,000. On December 23, one week before the game, Tech had sold 17,653 tickets. By the day of the game, the two teams had combined to sell approximately 33,000 tickets. Two days prior to the game, spread bettors favored Tennessee to win by seven points.

=== Tennessee offense ===
The Tennessee offense was led by freshman quarterback Peyton Manning, son of NFL great Archie Manning, who had played against the Hokies in the 1968 Liberty Bowl. During the regular season, Peyton played in seven games, winning six of them and completing 86 of his 139 pass attempts for 1,114 yards, 11 touchdowns, and six interceptions. Manning's passer rating of 145.2 was the third-highest among starting quarterbacks in the SEC. In recognition of his achievements, Manning was named the Southeastern Conference Freshman of the Year. One of Manning's more prominent passing targets was Billy Williams, who, despite suffering a stress fracture in the first game of the season, recovered to catch 20 passes for 217 yards and two touchdowns. He also returned 17 kickoffs for an average of 20.8 yards per return. Manning's favorite target was Joey Kent, who caught 36 passes for 470 yards during the regular season, but slightly injured his ankle in a pre-Gator Bowl practice.

The Volunteers' rushing offense had been led by Aaron Hayden during the regular season, but Hayden broke his leg during Tennessee's final regular season game. Due to the injury, James Stewart was forecast to start the game at running back for the Volunteers. During the regular season, Tennessee was ranked No. 13 in rushing, accumulating an average of 231.2 rushing yards per game. Stewart accounted for 93.5 yards of that total, having carried the ball 170 times for 1,028 yards and 11 touchdowns during the regular season. One of Tennessee's other backup running backs, Jay Graham, was predicted to be kept out of the game due to an injury, but played after undergoing surgery. Graham, who rushed 61 times for 275 yards during the regular season, suffered a broken jaw after being punched in the face by a teammate. Because of the injury to Graham, fourth-string running back Ronnie Pillow, who had carried the ball just five times during the regular season, was predicted to back up Stewart during the game.

Prior to the game, Tennessee coach Fulmer pronounced himself unsatisfied with the Vols' performance in opponents' red zone during the regular season. Tennessee scored on just 36 of 52 possessions inside the opposition's 20-yard line, a conversion rate of 69.2 percent. Fulmer vowed to raise that percentage to what it had been the previous season, when Tennessee converted 41 of 46 possessions, or 89.1 percent.

=== Virginia Tech offense ===
On offense, the Virginia Tech Hokies were led by quarterback Maurice DeShazo, who completed 164 of his 296 pass attempts during the regular season for 2,110 yards, 13 touchdowns, and 13 interceptions. DeShazo's success during the season helped him become the No. 4 all-time passing leader in Virginia Tech history, finishing his career with 5,720 passing yards. DeShazo's favorite passing target was wide receiver Antonio Freeman, who finished the season having caught 38 passes for 586 yards and five touchdowns. The Gator Bowl was Freeman's final collegiate game, just as it was DeShazo's. Freeman finished his career as the No. 1 receiver in Virginia Tech history in terms of yardage (bowl games were not counted in statistics until 2003) with 2,207 receiving yards. Freeman also was the team's leading punt returner, having returned 39 kicks for 467 yards and a touchdown, and received second-team All-Big East honors.

On the ground, Virginia Tech's rushing offense was led by running back Dwayne Thomas, who carried the ball 142 times for 642 yards and five touchdowns. Backing up Thomas was Tommy Edwards, son of former Virginia Tech player Ken Edwards, who played with the Hokies from 1967 to 1969, including the Hokies' trip to the 1968 Liberty Bowl. By participating in the Gator Bowl and in the previous season's Independence Bowl, the Edwardses became the first father-son combo in Virginia Tech history to have competed in a bowl game.

At the beginning of December, Virginia Tech's offensive preparations for the Gator Bowl were disrupted when offensive coordinator Gary Tranquill abruptly quit the team in order to join friend Nick Saban, who had been hired as the head coach at Michigan State. Virginia Tech head coach Frank Beamer announced simultaneous with Tranquill's departure that assistant head coach Billy Hite would control the offense during the Gator Bowl. Shortly after the announcement of Tranquill's departure, Virginia Tech announced that former offensive coordinator Ricky Bustle would be returning to the team to fill the position after the Gator Bowl. Though he was not able to actively coach the team during the Gator Bowl, Bustle offered advice and strategy to Beamer during the weeks before the game.

Virginia Tech receiver Cornelius White fractured his patella while playing pick-up basketball.

=== Tennessee defense ===
During the regular season, the Volunteers' scoring defense was ranked the second-best in the SEC, allowing an average of just 16.82 points per game. Tennessee also allowed just eight passing touchdowns and 20 touchdowns overall. One of Tennessee's defensive leaders was defensive end Steve White, who led the Volunteers in sacks and tackles for loss with seven and eight, respectively. Tennessee's leader in interceptions was Ronald Davis, who had two during the regular season. Scott Galyon had the most tackles on the team, with 93.

Strong safety Ray Austin, who had been named most valuable player in the Volunteers' loss to Penn State during the 1993 Citrus Bowl, had 50 tackles—second-best among Tennessee defensive backs—two fumble recoveries, a sack, and two tackles for loss despite playing in only six games. The Volunteers' defense also featured a cornerback named Tony Edge, a player from Virginia's Phoebus High School who had been heavily recruited by both Virginia Tech and Tennessee. Edge suffered a dislocated shoulder in the Volunteers' last regular-season game, but pledged he would play against the Hokies despite doctors' disapproval.

=== Virginia Tech defense ===
Defensively, the Virginia Tech Hokies allowed an average of 308 yards per game and 18.4 points per game. During the last two games of the regular season, however, the Hokies permitted 34 points and 42 points to Rutgers and Virginia, respectively. The Virginia Tech defense was led by two strong performers in the defensive secondary. Safety Torrian Gray intercepted four passes during the regular season, returning one of the catches for a touchdown. He tied with cornerback William Yarborough for the most interceptions on the team during the regular season. Neither player was the team's leading tackler, however. That honor went to linebacker George DelRicco, who had 130 tackles during the regular season.

Fellow linebacker Ken Brown was named a first-team All-Big East selection, signifying his status as one of the best players at his position in the conference. He finished the season with 93 tackles, including six for loss and two sacks, enough for No. 3 on the team in tackles. Despite that success, Brown suffered a pulled hamstring before Virginia Tech's final regular-season game and his presence in the Gator Bowl was doubtful. Virginia Tech sophomore defensive end Cornell Brown was named the best defensive college player in the state of Virginia by the Roanoke Times after earning 20 tackles for loss, including 11 sacks, and 35 quarterback hurries during the regular season.

== Game summary ==
The 1994 Gator Bowl kicked off on December 30, 1994, at 8 p.m. EST at Ben Hill Griffin Stadium in Gainesville, Florida. An estimated 62,200 fans were in attendance, and millions more people watched the game on television. TBS televised the game in the United States, and Gary Bender, Pat Haden, and Craig Sager were the broadcasters. Tennessee won the ceremonial pre-game coin toss and elected to kick off to Virginia Tech to begin the game.

=== First quarter ===
Virginia Tech's Tommy Edwards fielded the opening kickoff, which was returned to the Tech 29-yard line, where the Hokies' offense began the first play of the game, an incomplete pass by Virginia Tech quarterback Maurice DeShazo. On the second play of the game, DeShazo again attempted a forward pass. This time, however, the ball was intercepted by Tennessee linebacker Tyrone Hines. Hines returned the ball to the Tech 28-yard line, allowing the Volunteers' offense to begin the game already in scoring position. Tennessee's first play was a run up the middle by James Stewart, who gained three yards. On the second play, Tennessee quarterback Peyton Manning completed a nine-yard pass to wide receiver Nilo Silvan. During the play, Silvan suffered a broken ankle and did not return to the game. Now at the 16-yard line, Tennessee continued its drive with a rush by Stewart, who wasn't able to advance the ball. On the next play, the Volunteers were penalized 10 yards for a block in the back of a Virginia Tech player. Despite the penalty and an incomplete pass on a subsequent play, Tennessee was able to gain a first down to the five-yard line with a pass from Manning to Joey Kent. Two plays later, the Volunteers scored on a one-yard touchdown run by Stewart. The extra point kick was successful, and Tennessee took a 7–0 lead with 11:41 remaining in the first quarter.

Following Tennessee's touchdown, the two teams traded possessions, each going three and out. Virginia Tech regained the ball after a Tennessee punt to its 20-yard line with 7:31 remaining in the quarter. After a Tech fumble that was recovered by the Hokies, Tech running back Dwayne Thomas ran nine yards for the first Tech first down of the game. After an incomplete pass, DeShazo and Thomas connected on an eight-yard pass before Thomas broke free for an 11-yard run and another first down. Thomas continued advancing the ball, picking up eight yards on two rushing plays. DeShazo then completed a four-yard pass for a first down at the Tennessee 39-yard line. There, however, Tennessee's defense stiffened and did not allow the Hokies another first down. The Tech punt was downed at the Tennessee 7-yard line, where the Volunteers began their third possession of the game.

On the first play of the drive, Tennessee committed a five-yard false start penalty, pushing the Volunteers back toward their goal line. A Tennessee rush was stopped for no gain, then Stewart picked up eight yards on a running play. Needing eight yards for a first down, Manning threw an 11-yard pass to Kent for the first down. On the next play, Manning completed a 43-yard toss to Kent, driving the Volunteers into the Virginia Tech half of the field. Manning's next throw was a 35-yard touchdown throw to Marcus Nash. The extra point was good, and Tennessee took a 14–0 lead with 1:08 remaining in the quarter.

Tennessee's kickoff went out of bounds, allowing Tech's offense to start at its 35-yard line. DeShazo threw an incomplete pass, then completed one for a nine-yard gain. Needing one yard for a first down, Tech fullback Bryan Edwards was stopped for a loss and the Hokies were forced to punt. Tennessee fair caught the ball at their 20-yard line, where the Volunteers' offense again began to work. A five-yard penalty pushed the Volunteers backward, but running back Jay Graham regained the lost five yards with a run on the next play and the clock ran out in the quarter. At the end of the first quarter, Tennessee led, 14–0.

=== Second quarter ===
At the beginning of the second quarter, Tennessee had the ball at its 19-yard line, facing a second down and ten. On the first play of the quarter, Tennessee ran an end-around to Kendrick Jones, who ran the ball for 76 yards, giving the Volunteers a first down at the Virginia Tech five-yard line. Three plays later, running back Jay Graham crossed the goal line for the first Tennessee touchdown of the second quarter. The extra point was good, and with 13:23 remaining in the first half, Tennessee took a 21–0 lead.

Following Tennessee's post-touchdown kickoff and a short kick return, the Virginia Tech offense began at its 24-yard line. The first Tech play of the quarter, a run up the middle by Edmonds, resulted in a 17-yard gain and a first down. Dwayne Thomas followed Edmonds' run with one of his own, advancing the ball to the 50-yard line. He pushed into Tennessee territory on the next play, a five-yard run that gave the Hokies a first down at the Tennessee 45-yard line. DeShazo then ran nine yards, and Tech gained a first down on the next play. Inside the Tennessee 35-yard line, however, the Volunteers' defense stiffened. DeShazo passed for a seven-yard gain, but the Hokies were unable to gain a first down until DeShazo scrambled for a 13-yard gain on fourth down. The run kept the Tech drive alive as the Hokies now had a first down at the Tennessee 14-yard line. Tennessee forced another third-down play, but the Hokies gained a first down at the Tennessee three-yard line with a pass from DeShazo to Thomas. Four plays later, the Hokies scored their first points of the game as Thomas dove across the goal line on fourth down. The subsequent extra point was good, and the Hokies cut Tennessee's lead to 21–7 with 5:17 remaining in the first half.

Virginia Tech's kickoff was returned to the Tennessee 26-yard line, and the Volunteers' offense returned to the field. Instead of Peyton Manning, backup quarterback Branndon Stewart came on the field to lead Tennessee. On the second play of the Tennessee drive, Stewart gained 24 yards on a quarterback scramble, giving the Volunteers a first down at the Tennessee 49-yard line. On the next play, he completed a 27-yard pass to Kent for another first down. Two plays later, James Stewart broke free for an 18-yard run that gave Tennessee a first down at the Virginia Tech one-yard line. One play later, Stewart crossed the goal line for Tennessee's second touchdown of the quarter. The extra point was good, and Tennessee's lead was again 21 points, 28–7, with 3:22 remaining in the quarter.

The Volunteers' kickoff was returned to the Tech 22-yard line, and the Hokies began another drive. On the first play of the drive, however, Maurice DeShazo scrambled for a ten-yard gain but fumbled the ball. The loose ball was recovered by a Tennessee defender, and the Volunteers took over on offense from the Tech 32-yard line. Branndon Stewart came out onto the field in place of Manning, and completed an eight-yard pass to James Stewart to begin the drive. James Stewart then ran to the 20-yard line for a first down. On the next play, Tennessee executed a trick play in which James Stewart received the ball via a hand-off, imitating a running play, but threw the ball instead. The pass was caught by James Kendrick for a touchdown, and after the extra point, Tennessee had a 35–7 lead with 2:08 remaining in the first half.

The kickoff was returned to the Tech 27-yard line, and the Hokies began the final drive of the second quarter. Antonio Freeman caught a six-yard pass from DeShazo, then DeShazo completed a five-yard pass to Shawn Scales. DeShazo completed a four-yard pass, then Ken Oxendine had a seven-yard catch from DeShazo at the Tech 49-yard line. On the next play, Oxendine caught a short pass that pushed the Hokies to the Tennessee 45-yard line, then DeShazo threw his first incomplete pass of the drive. The incompletion stopped the clock with 37 seconds remaining, allowing time for DeShazo to complete a 26-yard pass to Bryan Still on the next play. Now inside the Tennessee red zone, the Hokies continued to move the ball via short passes. Tech gained a first down at the Tennessee six-yard line, and used a timeout to stop the clock in order to have a chance to earn a touchdown before halftime. On a subsequent play, however, Tech committed a five-yard penalty, and Tech head coach Frank Beamer ordered kicker Ryan Williams into the game. Williams' 27-yard field goal attempt was good, and Tech cut Tennessee's lead to 35–10 at the end of the first half.

=== Third quarter ===
Because Virginia Tech received the ball to begin the game, Tennessee received the ball to begin the second half. Tech's kickoff was returned to the Tennessee 13-yard line, and Peyton Manning returned to the field to lead the Volunteers' offense. The first play of the second half was an eight-yard run by James Stewart, which was followed by a six-yard run by Stewart for a first down at the Tennessee 27-yard line. Another Stewart run was followed by two short completions from Manning, and the Volunteers had another first down at the 37-yard line. Tennessee's next play was negated by an offensive pass interference penalty against the Volunteers, who were pushed back to the 22-yard line by the penalty. Though Manning gained 22 yards with a third-down pass, Tennessee was unable to gain enough yards for a first down and punted. During the kick, Tennessee committed a penalty and had to kick again after the five-yard penalty was assessed. The punt was fair caught at the Tech 25-yard line, and the Hokies began their first offensive possession of the second half with 10:14 remaining in the third quarter.

On the first play, DeShazo completed an 18-yard pass to Still, who gave the Hokies a first down at their 43-yard line. On the next play, Tech wide receiver Antonio Freeman committed a pass interference penalty, pushing the Hokies back 15 yards. Dwayne Thomas made good the penalty by gaining 16 yards on an option run, which was followed by a 17-yard pass from DeShazo to Freeman, who kept the Hokies' drive going with a first down at the Tennessee 39-yard line. After an incomplete pass, Thomas broke free for a 27-yard run along the left side of the field, giving Tech a first down at the Tennessee 13-yard line. Tennessee's defense held for three plays, forcing a fourth down. Instead of kicking a field goal, the Hokies attempted to convert the fourth down by running the ball. DeShazo scrambled, broke free of the defense, and crossed the goal line for the first Tech touchdown of the second half. Williams missed the extra point kick, however, and Tech cut Tennessee's lead to 35–16 with 7:03 remaining in the quarter.

The kickoff was returned to the Tennessee 17-yard line, and Tennessee's offense began work. The Volunteers were aided by a five-yard offsides penalty against Virginia Tech on the first play of the drive, but the Hokies stopped the Tennessee offense for losses or no gain until Manning threw a 14-yard pass on third down, pushing Tennessee to the 34-yard line. After two incomplete passes, Manning scrambled 27 yards for another first down, this time at the Tech 39-yard line. Once there, however, the Virginia Tech defense stiffened and did not allow another first down during the drive. Tennessee kicker John Becksvoort came into the game, seemingly to attempt a 48-yard field goal. The kick turned out to be a trick play—an attempted pass by the kick holder—but Hokie defender Mike Williams tackled the holder for a loss.

After the failed trick play, the Hokies' offense started at their 44-yard line. The first Tech play of the drive was a 15-yard pass from DeShazo to Still for a first down. A three-yard run by Thomas was followed by a seven-yard reverse by Still for another first down at the Tennessee 29-yard line. On first down, Thomas pushed the Hokies eight yards forward with a run up the middle. This was followed by two incomplete passes, bringing up fourth down. Again, Tech head coach Frank Beamer elected to try to convert the fourth down rather than kick a field goal. Unlike Tech's previous fourth down, however, the try was unsuccessful after DeShazo mishandled the snap and was tackled for a loss. Virginia Tech turned the ball over on downs, and Tennessee's offense returned to the game with 1:31 remaining in the quarter.

The Volunteers started at their 27-yard line to begin the drive, but went three and out and punted back to the Hokies without gaining a first down. The kick was returned to the Tech 39-yard line, where the Hokies' offense started with 31 seconds remaining in the quarter. On the first play of the drive, wide receiver Bryan Still broke away from the Tennessee defense and was wide open for a pass. Maurice DeShazo threw the ball to Still, but Still dropped the pass after it bounced off his chest, thus denying the Hokies a touchdown. Virginia Tech head coach Frank Beamer later cited the dropped pass as a critical turning point in the game, saying, "I think if he could have made that catch, we could have gotten back in the game." Tech player Torrian Gray agreed, saying, "When he dropped the ball, that took a lot out of us." After Still's dropped pass, DeShazo threw two incomplete passes and Virginia Tech punted back to Tennessee. The kick was caught by near the Tennessee 10-yard line, and returned all the way to the Virginia Tech 37-yard line. At the end of the third quarter, Tennessee still led, 35–16.

=== Fourth quarter ===
The fourth quarter began with Tennessee in possession of the ball and facing a first-and-10 at the Virginia Tech 37-yard line after a long punt return. Stewart ran twice for six yards, then Manning completed a pass to Kent at the 20-yard line for a first down. Manning then completed a pass to Nash for another first down at the Tech five-yard line. Two plays later, Stewart scored his third touchdown of the game with a five-yard run to the right side of the field. The extra point was good, and with 13:17 remaining in the game, Tennessee took a 42–16 lead.

Bryan Still fielded the Tennessee kickoff and returned it to the 19-yard line of Virginia Tech. After a short pass, DeShazo threw his second interception of the game. Tennessee defender John Summers returned the catch to the Tech 19-yard line, and backup quarterback Branndon Stewart returned to the game for Tennessee's offense. James Stewart took the first play of the Volunteers' drive, an eight-yard gain, then backup Jay Graham entered the game and ran to the five-yard line for a first down. After the next play—, a two-yard run by Graham—Tennessee committed a 15-yard personal foul penalty, pushing the Volunteers back to the 17-yard line. Branndon Stewart completed a pass to tight end David Horn, pushing Tennessee back to the three-yard line, but not gaining enough for a first down. Tennessee kicker John Becksvoort returned to the game, and his 19-yard field goal attempt was good, giving the Volunteers a 45–16 lead with 9:41 to go in the game.

Following the kickoff and return, backup Virginia Tech quarterback Jim Druckenmiller entered the game to guide the Hokies' offense. The first play of the drive, however, was a run by backup running back Ken Oxendine, who gained five yards. Two more runs by Oxendine failed to gain a first down, however, and Virginia Tech punted. Tennessee's Sean Summers returned the kick to the Volunteers' 40-yard line, and the Volunteers continued trying to run out the clock. Tennessee failed to gain a first down, and the resulting punt rolled into the end zone for a touchback.

From the Tech 20-yard line, Druckenmiller completed a 13-yard pass to Still for a first down at the Tech 33-yard line. On the next play, Druckenmiller completed a long pass to tight end Bryan Jennings, who carried the ball 41 yards. Following the play, the Volunteers completed a penalty, advancing the ball to the Tennessee 22-yard line. Two short runs advanced the Hokies to the 19-yard line, then Druckenmiller completed a 10-yard pass to Freeman for a first down. On the next play, Druckenmiller connected with Still for a nine-yard touchdown pass. The extra point was good, and Tennessee's lead was cut to 45–23, but with only 4:13 remaining in the game, the game seemed out of reach for the Hokies.

Virginia Tech's kickoff was recovered in the end zone for a touchback, and the Volunteers started at their 20-yard line. Tennessee resumed running out the clock via short runs up the middle of the field that kept the game clock ticking down. After not gaining a first down, Tennessee punted to the Hokies with less than two minutes remaining in the game. Tech wide receiver Antonio Freeman returned the kick to the Tech 42-yard line, and on the first play of the Hokie drive, Druckenmiller completed a 17-yard pass to the Tennessee 41-yard line. That completion was followed by a nine-yard pass to Jermaine Holmes. After an incomplete pass that almost was intercepted, Druckenmiller threw an incomplete pass before Oxendine failed to gain enough yards for a first down and Tech turned the ball over on downs. With less than a minute remaining, Tennessee's offense ran out the remaining seconds on the clock and secured a 45–23 victory.

== Statistical summary ==
Statistical comparison
	UT	VT
1st downs	18	22
Total yards	495	426
Passing yards	250	237
Rushing yards	245	189
Penalties	7–58	3–25
Turnovers	1	3
Time of possession	30:55	29:05

In recognition of their performances during the game, Tennessee's James Stewart and Virginia Tech's Maurice DeShazo were named the game's most valuable players. Stewart finished the game having carried the ball 22 times for 85 yards and three rushing touchdowns. Stewart also caught one pass for seven yards and threw a touchdown pass for 19 yards. On the other side, DeShazo completed 17 of his 30 passes for 140 yards and two interceptions. He also ran the ball 11 times for 39 yards and a rushing touchdown.

Though Stewart was named the most valuable player for the Volunteers, multiple Tennessee players had statistically significant games. Volunteer quarterback Peyton Manning finished the game having completed 12 of his 19 pass attempts for 189 yards, one touchdown, and one interception. Backup Tennessee quarterback Brandon Stewart completed all three of his pass attempts, accumulating 49 yards in the process. Tennessee receiver Joey Kent was the primary beneficiary of the Volunteer passing attack, leading all receivers during the game with six receptions for 116 yards. Tennessee's passing touchdowns went to Kendrick Jones, who also had 37 receiving yards and 76 rushing yards; and Marcus Nash, who caught three passes for 54 yards.

Virginia Tech's offense, though far less successful than Tennessee's, also had some high performers. Running Back Dwayne Thomas finished the game with 19 carries for 102 yards and a touchdown, becoming the game's leading rusher in terms of yardage, if not points scored. The Hokies' leading receiver, Bryan Still, caught five passes for 79 yards and a touchdown. The touchdown pass came from Tech backup quarterback Jim Druckenmiller, who finished the game having completed six of his eight pass attempts for 97 yards and the touchdown.

The 68 points scored in the game were a Gator Bowl record at the time, and Tennessee's 35 first-half points also were a Gator Bowl record. Kendrick Jones' 76-yard run on the first play of the second quarter was the longest in Gator Bowl history at the time. Stewart's three touchdowns and the Volunteers' six touchdowns were Tennessee bowl game records at the time, and the Volunteers also set Tennessee bowl-game records for most points and offensive yardage.

== Postgame effects ==
With the win, Tennessee finished the 1994 college football season with an overall record of 8–4. In the final Associated Press poll of the year, the Volunteers were ranked No. 22. Virginia Tech's loss also took it to a final record of 8–4, and the Hokies fell from their No. 17 spot in the AP poll to being unranked. In the USA Today Coaches Poll, Tech dropped to No. 24. This game was also the final meeting of the Hokies and the Volunteers until the 2009 Chick-fil-A Bowl. Despite their regional proximity to each other, there were numerous failed attempts at scheduling a game between the universities. These efforts finally paid off in October 2013 when the two schools announced the Battle at Bristol, which was played at the Bristol Motor Speedway in Bristol, Tennessee, on September 10, 2016. The game featured the largest crowd in history to see a football game, i.e. approximately 150,000 fans over the current record of 115,109 fans who saw Michigan play Notre Dame in September 2013.

This was the last appearance of an SEC team in the Gator Bowl until 2011. Conversely, it was the last Gator Bowl which did not feature a team from the ACC (which admitted Virginia Tech in 2004) for the same period. After this game, the Gator Bowl entered into exclusive tie-in contracts with the ACC and the Big East until 2010 (with the addition of the Big 12 and Notre Dame from 2006 to 2010).
