= Cory Stone =

American gridiron football player and coach (born 1972)

Central State Marauders
- Title: Defensive coordinator & defensive line coach

Personal information
- Born: March 6, 1972 (age 54); Memphis, Tennessee, U.S.
- Listed height: 6 ft 3 in (1.91 m)
- Listed weight: 317 lb (144 kg)

Career information
- High school: Memphis (TN) Central
- College: Tennessee
- NFL draft: 1994: undrafted

Career history

Playing
- Iowa Barnstormers (2000); New York Dragons (2001–2002); Carolina Cobras (2004)

Coaching
- Bakersfield Blitz (2006) Defensive line coach; Rio Grande Valley Dorados (2007–2008) Associate head coach & defensive coordinator; Milwaukee Iron (2009) Defensive coordinator; Clark Atlanta (2010–2011) Defensive line coach; Toronto Argonauts (2012–2017) Defensive line coach; Redan HS (GA) (2018) Assistant head coach; Tuskegee (2019–2021) Defensive line coach; Central State (2022–present) Defensive coordinator & defensive line coach

Career AFL statistics
- Tackles: 31
- Sacks: 2
- Pass breakups: 3
- Fumble recoveries: 3
- Blocked kicks: 1
- Stats at ArenaFan.com

Cory Stone (born March 6, 1972) is an American gridiron football coach and former player. He is the defensive coordinator and defensive line coach for Central State University, positions he has held since 2022. He has worked as an assistant coach with the Toronto Argonauts of the Canadian Football League (CFL). Stone coached the Argonauts to a victory in the 100th Grey Cup in 2012. He played college football at the University of Tennessee from 1992 to 1994 and professionally in the Arena Football League from 1996 to 2005. Stone has coached in the Arena Football League for the Bakersfield Blitz, Rio Grande Valley Dorados, and Milwaukee Iron. He has coached college football at Clark Atlanta University.

== Early life ==
Stone played high school football for and graduated from Central High School in Memphis, Tennessee. Attended The University of Tennessee, Knoxville.

== College career ==
Stone attended the University of Tennessee, where he was a two-year letterman (1992–1994). During his time as a defensive end and defensive tackle, he played in the 1993 Hall of Fame Bowl, 1994 Florida Citrus Bowl, and the 1994 Gator Bowl.

== Professional playing career ==
Stone played in the Arena Football League from 1996 to 2005.

== Coaching career ==
=== Bakersfield Blitz ===
Stone began his professional coaching career in 2006 as defensive line coach for the Bakersfield Blitz. He coached the AFL2 Defensive lineman of the year Jerry Turner. The Blitz defensive line had three players ranked in the top ten for sacks (Turner led the league 16).

=== Rio Grande Valley Dorados ===
After his time with the Bakersfield, Stone served two seasons as associate head coach/defensive coordinator for the Rio Grande Valley in 1998. The Dorados won the Southwest Division title with a 15-1 record. The Dorados defense posted several AF2 historic records for most sacks for in a season (58), most sacks in a game (13), and shut out of an opponent 64-0 (Laredo).

=== Milwaukee Iron ===
Stone then served one season as defensive coordinator/defensive line coach for the Iron in 2009.

=== Clark Atlanta ===
Stone then entered the college ranks for two seasons as the defensive line coach for the panthers. Under Stone's coaching, the Panthers were rank number #2 in the nation for TFLs. Under Stone's tutelage in 2010 and 2012, The Panthers also finished in the top twenty for sacks in 2010 and 2011. He coached defensive lineman Darel Strong to the SIAC all first team in 2011.

=== Toronto Argonauts ===
In 2012, Stone helped lead the Toronto Argonauts to a historic 100th Grey Cup win over the Calgary Stampeders. He held the title for one season as defensive line coach. Rick Foley was named the Most Outstanding Canadian player for the 100th Grey Cup. Defensive tackle Armond Armstead was selected to the CFL East All Star and CFL All Star teams. Armstead was the only rookie sectioned to the All Star teams under Stones' tutelage.
