= 1994 Tennessee Volunteers football team =

American college football season

1994 Tennessee Volunteers football

Gator Bowl champion

Gator Bowl, W 45–23 vs. Virginia Tech
- Conference: Southeastern Conference
- Eastern Division

Ranking
- Coaches: No. 18
- AP: No. 22
- Record: 8–4 (5–3 SEC)
- Head coach: Phillip Fulmer (2nd season)
- Offensive coordinator: David Cutcliffe (2nd season)
- Offensive scheme: Pro-style
- Defensive coordinator: Larry Marmie (3rd season)
- Base defense: 4–3
- Captains: Kevin Mays; Ben Talley
- Home stadium: Neyland Stadium

1994 Southeastern Conference football standings
	Conf.					Overall
Team	W		L		T	W		L		T
Eastern Division
No. 7 Florida x$	7	–	1	–	0	10	–	2	–	1
No. 22 Tennessee	5	–	3	–	0	8	–	4	–	0
South Carolina	4	–	4	–	0	7	–	5	–	0
Georgia	3	–	4	–	1	6	–	4	–	1
Vanderbilt	2	–	6	–	0	5	–	6	–	0
Kentucky	0	–	8	–	0	1	–	10	–	0
Western Division
No. 5 Alabama x	8	–	0	–	0	12	–	1	–	0
No. 9 Auburn	6	–	1	–	1	9	–	1	–	1
No. 24 Mississippi State	5	–	3	–	0	8	–	4	–	0
LSU	3	–	5	–	0	4	–	7	–	0
Arkansas	2	–	6	–	0	4	–	7	–	0
Ole Miss	2	–	6	–	0	4	–	7	–	0
Championship: Florida 24, Alabama 23
$ – Conference champion; x – Division champion/co-champions; Rankings from AP Poll

The 1994 Tennessee Volunteers football team represented the University of Tennessee in the 1994 NCAA Division I-A football season. Phillip Fulmer was the head coach. Freshman Peyton Manning began the season as Tennessee's third-string quarterback, but injuries to Todd Helton and Jerry Colquitt forced him into the lineup in a game against Mississippi State, which the Volunteers lost 24–21. In his first start the following week against Washington State, the Vols won, 10–9. They lost only one more game the rest of the season, finishing 8–4 with a 45–23 victory over Virginia Tech in the Gator Bowl.

== Schedule ==
Date	Time	Opponent	Rank	Site	TV	Result	Attendance	Source
September 3	8:00 p.m.	at No. 14 UCLA*	No. 13	Rose Bowl; Pasadena, CA	ABC	L 23–25	55,169	
September 10	7:00 p.m.	at No. 23 Georgia	No. 19	Sanford Stadium; Athens, GA (rivalry)	ESPN	W 41–23	86,117	
September 17	6:30 p.m.	No. 1 Florida	No. 15	Neyland Stadium; Knoxville, TN (rivalry)	ESPN	L 0–31	96,656	
September 24	12:30 p.m.	at Mississippi State	No. 23	Scott Field; Starkville, MS	JPS	L 21–24	41,071	
October 1	4:00 p.m.	No. 17 Washington State*^{†}		Neyland Stadium; Knoxville, TN		W 10–9	95,556	
October 8	1:00 p.m.	Arkansas		Neyland Stadium; Knoxville, TN	PPV	W 38–21	94,997	
October 15	6:30 p.m.	No. 10 Alabama		Neyland Stadium; Knoxville, TN (Third Saturday in October)	ESPN	L 13–17	96,856	
October 29	1:00 p.m.	at South Carolina		Williams–Brice Stadium; Columbia, SC (rivalry)	PPV	W 31–22	74,200	
November 12	1:00 p.m.	Memphis*		Neyland Stadium; Knoxville, TN		W 24–13	94,690	
November 19	12:30 p.m.	Kentucky		Neyland Stadium; Knoxville, TN (rivalry)	JPS	W 52–0	95,066	
November 26	12:30 p.m.	at Vanderbilt		Vanderbilt Stadium; Nashville, TN (rivalry)	JPS	W 65–0	38,816	
December 30	8:00 p.m.	vs. No. 17 Virginia Tech*		Ben Hill Griffin Stadium; Gainesville, FL (Gator Bowl)	TBS	W 45–23	62,200	
*Non-conference game; ^{†}Homecoming; Rankings from AP Poll released prior to the game; All times are in Eastern time

== Roster ==
1994 Tennessee Volunteers football team roster
Players
Coaches
Offense

Pos.	#	Name	Class
FB	19	Mose Phillips	Sr
FB	20	Chester Ford	So
C	52	Mark Holland	Sr
C	59	Sam Pinner	Fr
C	71	Bubba Miller	Jr
G	73	Trey Peterson	Jr
G	74	Jeff Smith	Jr
G	67	Kevin Mays (C)	Sr
G	70	Trey Teague	Fr
OT	66	Jason Laymon	Jr
OT	72	Jarvis Reado	Fr
OT	65	Robert Poole	Fr
OT	75	Leslie Ratliffe	Jr
OT	79	Brad Lampley	Fr
QB	2	Todd Helton	Jr
QB	6	Brandon Stewart	Fr
QB	14	Jerry Colquit	Sr
QB	16	Peyton Manning	Fr
RB	5	Eric Lane	So
RB	19	Mark Levine	Fr
RB	24	Aaron Hayden	Sr
RB	25	Jay Graham	So
RB	33	James Stewart	Sr
TE	82	David Horn	Jr
TE	86	Dustin Moore	So
TE	87	John Sartelle	So
TE	89	Scott Pfeiffer	Jr
WR		Greg Kyler	So
WR	11	Joey Kent	So
WR	12	Marcus Nash	Fr
WR	21	Maurice Staley	Jr
WR	80	Billy Williams	Sr
WR	81	Benjie Shuler	So
WR	88	Andy McCullough	Fr
WR	83	Nilo Silvan	Jr

Defense

Pos.	#	Name	Class
CB	1	Ronald Davis	Sr
CB	13	Terry Fair	Fr
CB	18	DeRon Jenkins	Jr
CB	23	Shawn Summers	Jr
CB	26	Shane Begnaud	Fr
CB	34	Steve Johnson	Fr
CB	36	Troy Edge	Fr
CB	41	Troy Pratt	So
DE	46	John Emery	Jr
DE	90	Ben Talley (C)	Sr
DE	64	Steve White	Jr
DE	91	Jonathan Brown	Fr
DE	94	Billy Beron	So
DT	50	Bill Duff	Fr
DT	57	Leland Taylor	Sr
DT	77	Richard Howard	Jr
DT	84	Shane Burton	Jr
DT	91	Brent Gibson	So
FS	7	Jason Parker	Jr
FS	9	Tori Noel	So
LB	38	Greg Johnson	So
LB	44	Craig King	So
LB	45	Nick Jester	So
LB	47	Tyrone Hines	So
LB	3	Ronnie Pillow	So
LB	14	Quincy Prigmore	Jr
LB	22	Jesse Sanders	Jr
LB	42	George Kidd	Jr
LB	85	Anthony Hampton	So
LB	93	Scott Galyon	Jr
SS	28	Raymond Austin	So
SS	30	Cory Gaines	Fr

Special teams

Pos.	#	Name	Class
P	43	Tom Hutton	Sr
PK	10	John Becksvoort	Sr
KR/PR		Nilo Silvan

Head coach

- Phillip Fulmer

Coordinators/assistant coaches

- David Cutcliffe – Offensive coordinator/quarterbacks
- Randy Sanders – Running backs/recruiting coordinator
- Kippy Brown – Wide receivers/assistant head coach
- Mark Bradley – Tight ends
- Steve Marshall – Offensive line
- Larry Marmie – Defensive coordinator
- Dan Brooks – Defensive line
- John Chavis – Linebackers
- Lovie Smith – Defensive backs

Legend

- (C) Team captain
- (S) Suspended
- (I) Ineligible
- Injured
- Redshirt

Roster

== Team players drafted into the NFL ==
Player	Position	Round	Pick	NFL club
James Stewart	Running back	1	19	Jacksonville Jaguars
Ron Davis	Defensive back	2	41	Atlanta Falcons
Aaron Hayden	Running back	4	104	San Diego Chargers
Ben Talley	Linebacker	4	133	New York Giants
Eli Herring	Tackle	6	190	Oakland Raiders
Billy Williams	Wide receiver	7	212	Arizona Cardinals
