= Joe Lee Dunn =

American football player and coach (1946–2021)

Biographical details
- Born: July 14, 1946; Ozark, Alabama, U.S.
- Died: October 26, 2021 (aged 75); Columbus, Georgia, U.S.
- Education: University of Tennessee at Chattanooga

Playing career
- 1965–1967: Chattanooga

Coaching career (HC unless noted)
- 1971–1979: Chattanooga (assistant)
- 1980–1982: New Mexico (assistant)
- 1983–1986: New Mexico
- 1987–1988: South Carolina (DC)
- 1989: Memphis State (volunteer)
- 1990–1991: Memphis State (DC)
- 1992–1993: Ole Miss (DC)
- 1994: Ole Miss
- 1995: Arkansas (DC)
- 1996–2002: Mississippi State (DC/LB)
- 2003–2005: Memphis (DC)
- 2006–2007: Ridgeway HS (TN)
- 2008: New Mexico State (DC)
- 2009–2012: McMurry (DC)

Head coaching record
- Overall: 21–37 (college)

Joseph Levi "Joe Lee" Dunn, Sr (July 14, 1946 – October 26, 2021) was an American college football coach and player. As a defensive coordinator, he was known for coaching from the sidelines, seldom using a headset or carrying playsheets, and his aggressive, unorthodox schemes. He is widely credited with inventing the attacking 3–3–5 scheme that has been used by several college and high school teams.

== Playing career ==
Dunn attended the University of Chattanooga, now the University of Tennessee at Chattanooga, where he played football from 1965 to 1967. He was a Sigma Chi.

== Coaching and administrative career ==
In December 2007, Dunn was enlisted as defensive coordinator at New Mexico State University, serving under head coach Hal Mumme, who compiled a 7–29 record. In December 2008, Mumme was fired, and was later hired as head coach of McMurry University in Texas. Dunn joined Mumme's staff in April 2009 at the Division III school, and served as defensive coordinator through the 2012 season.

From 2006 until 2007, he was the head football coach at Ridgeway High School in Memphis, Tennessee.

From 2003 until 2005, he was the defensive coordinator of the Memphis Tigers football program. He transformed the Tigers defense from a unit that ranked near the bottom statistically in defense, to a top 25 defensive unit. Prior to coaching at Memphis, he was the defensive coordinator at Mississippi State from 1996 to 2002. In 1995, he served as the defensive coordinator at Arkansas, helping the Razorbacks win their first SEC Western Division championship that season.

In 1999, while serving as defensive coordinator and linebackers coach at Mississippi State, Dunn was a finalist for the Broyles Award, given annually to the nation's top college football assistant coach. "He came to Starkville prior to the 1996 season and inherited a defense that had just finished the year before ranked 12th in the Southeastern Conference. By 1999, the Bulldog defense was first in not only their league, but the entire country."

From 1992 to 1994, he served as the defensive coordinator at Mississippi. After Billy Brewer was fired just before the 1994 season, Dunn was named head coach and led the Rebels to a 4–7 record. From 1987 to 1988, he had served as South Carolina's defensive coordinator. From 1983 to 1986, he was the head football coach at New Mexico, where he compiled a 17–30 record.

== Death ==
Dunn, who had battled Alzheimer's disease for a few years, died at his home in Columbus, Georgia, on October 26, 2021, at the age of 75.

== Head coaching record ==
Year	Team	Overall	Conference	Standing	Bowl/playoffs
New Mexico Lobos (Western Athletic Conference) (1983–1986)
1983	New Mexico	6–6	4–3	4th	
1984	New Mexico	4–8	1–7	T–8th	
1985	New Mexico	3–8	2–6	7th	
1986	New Mexico	4–8	2–5	7th	
New Mexico:		17–30	9–21		
Ole Miss Rebels (Southeastern Conference) (1994)
1994	Ole Miss	4–7	2–6	T–5th (Western)	
Ole Miss:		4–7	2–6		
Total:		21–37			
