= 1994 SEC Championship Game =

- Conference Championship
- 1994 SEC Championship logo
Alabama Crimson Tide	Florida Gators
(11–0)	(9–1–1)
23	24
Head coach: Gene Stallings	Head coach: Steve Spurrier
AP / Coaches; 3 / 3	AP / Coaches; 6 / 6
	1	2	3	4	Total
Alabama	7	3	6	7	23
Florida	7	10	0	7	24
- Date: December 3, 1994
- Season: 1994
- Stadium: Georgia Dome
- Location: Atlanta, Georgia
- MVP: DT Ellis Johnson, Florida
- Favorite: Florida by 7
- Referee: Dick Burleson
- Attendance: 74,751

United States TV coverage
- Network: ABC
- Nielsen ratings: 10.5

1994 Southeastern Conference football standings
	Conf.					Overall
Team	W		L		T	W		L		T
Eastern Division
No. 7 Florida x$	7	–	1	–	0	10	–	2	–	1
No. 22 Tennessee	5	–	3	–	0	8	–	4	–	0
South Carolina	4	–	4	–	0	7	–	5	–	0
Georgia	3	–	4	–	1	6	–	4	–	1
Vanderbilt	2	–	6	–	0	5	–	6	–	0
Kentucky	0	–	8	–	0	1	–	10	–	0
Western Division
No. 5 Alabama x	8	–	0	–	0	12	–	1	–	0
No. 9 Auburn	6	–	1	–	1	9	–	1	–	1
No. 24 Mississippi State	5	–	3	–	0	8	–	4	–	0
LSU	3	–	5	–	0	4	–	7	–	0
Arkansas	2	–	6	–	0	4	–	7	–	0
Ole Miss	2	–	6	–	0	4	–	7	–	0
Championship: Florida 24, Alabama 23
$ – Conference champion; x – Division champion/co-champions; Rankings from AP Poll

The 1994 SEC Championship Game was won by the Florida Gators 24–23 over the Alabama Crimson Tide.

After two years at Legion Field, the 1994 game was the first to be played in the Georgia Dome in Atlanta. The game was played on December 3, 1994, and was televised to a national audience on ABC.
