= 2001 Cotton Bowl Classic =

2001 SBC Cotton Bowl Classic
- 65th Cotton Bowl Classic
- The Cotton Bowl in Dallas, Texas, hosted the Cotton Bowl Classic.
Tennessee Volunteers	Kansas State Wildcats
(8–3)	(10–3)
SEC	Big 12
21	35
Head coach: Phillip Fulmer	Head coach: Bill Snyder
AP / Coaches / BCS; 21 / 21 / NR	AP / Coaches / BCS; 11 / 9 / 9
	1	2	3	4	Total
Tennessee	0	14	0	7	21
Kansas State	7	14	14	0	35
- Date: January 1, 2001
- Season: 2000
- Stadium: Cotton Bowl
- Location: Dallas, Texas
- MVP: QB Jonathan Beasley (Kansas State); DE Chris L. Johnson (Kansas State)
- Referee: R.G. Detillier (C-USA)
- Attendance: 63,465

United States TV coverage
- Network: Fox
- Announcers: Thom Brennaman, Tim Green and Dave Lapham

The 2001 Southwestern Bell Cotton Bowl Classic was a college football bowl game played on January 1, 2001, at the Cotton Bowl in Dallas, Texas, USA. The Cotton Bowl was part of the 2000 NCAA Division I-A football season. The bowl game featured the Tennessee Volunteers from the SEC and the Kansas State Wildcats from the Big 12 and was televised in the United States on Fox.

== Game summary ==
The Kansas State Wildcats became just the second team to win 11 games in four consecutive seasons by defeating The Tennessee Volunteers, 35–21, in the 2001 Cotton Bowl Classic.

Third-quarter touchdown runs of 12 and six yards by junior Josh Scobey three minutes apart were the difference as Kansas State improved its four-year record to 44–8, including three bowl victories.

The Wildcats (11–3) joined The Florida State Seminoles as the only teams to reach the 11-win plateau in four consecutive seasons.

After losing to #1 Oklahoma in the Big 12 Conference championship game, Wildcats head coach Bill Snyder gave his players the chance to vote on whether or not they wanted to accept a Cotton Bowl Classic bid. The vote was unanimous, and the Wildcats played well in their second trip to Dallas in five years.

Having lost the 1997 Cotton Bowl Classic to BYU, the Wildcats scored on their second possession and led 21–7 just 19½ minutes into the contest.

Senior quarterback Jonathan Beasley ran for a 14-yard score and threw TD passes of 56 and 10 yards to Quincy Morgan to give Kansas State the two-touchdown advantage.

The Wildcats frustrated Tennessee freshman quarterback Casey Clausen into a miserable 7-of-25, three-interception performance. Clausen did throw a 17-yard TD pass to TE David Martin, forcing a 7–7 tie in the first minute of the second quarter.

Scobey set a Kansas State bowl record by rushing for 147 yards on 28 carries, breaking the mark of 133 yards set by J.J. Smith in the 1993 Copper Bowl. Beasley added 98 yards on 17 attempts while completing 13-of-27 passes for 210 yards.

Tennessee's Travis Henry carried 17 times for 180 yards, 81 coming on a late touchdown scamper. The Volunteers (8–4) had their seven-game winning streak halted.
