= 1994 LSU Tigers football team =

American college football season

1994 LSU Tigers football
- Conference: Southeastern Conference
- Western Division
- Record: 4–7 (3–5 SEC)
- Head coach: Curley Hallman (4th season)
- Offensive coordinator: Lynn Amedee (2nd season)
- Offensive scheme: Multiple
- Defensive coordinator: Phil Bennett (1st season)
- Base defense: 4–3
- Home stadium: Tiger Stadium

1994 Southeastern Conference football standings
	Conf.					Overall
Team	W		L		T	W		L		T
Eastern Division
No. 7 Florida x$	7	–	1	–	0	10	–	2	–	1
No. 22 Tennessee	5	–	3	–	0	8	–	4	–	0
South Carolina	4	–	4	–	0	7	–	5	–	0
Georgia	3	–	4	–	1	6	–	4	–	1
Vanderbilt	2	–	6	–	0	5	–	6	–	0
Kentucky	0	–	8	–	0	1	–	10	–	0
Western Division
No. 5 Alabama x	8	–	0	–	0	12	–	1	–	0
No. 9 Auburn	6	–	1	–	1	9	–	1	–	1
No. 24 Mississippi State	5	–	3	–	0	8	–	4	–	0
LSU	3	–	5	–	0	4	–	7	–	0
Arkansas	2	–	6	–	0	4	–	7	–	0
Ole Miss	2	–	6	–	0	4	–	7	–	0
Championship: Florida 24, Alabama 23
$ – Conference champion; x – Division champion/co-champions; Rankings from AP Poll

The 1994 LSU Tigers football team represented Louisiana State University in the 1994 NCAA Division I-A football season. LSU finished with a 4–7 overall record (3–5 in SEC play). It was Curley Hallman's final season as head coach, as he was fired with two games remaining in the season, although he coached those contests.

The beginning of the end for Hallman came in the season's third game. LSU led an Auburn squad, which went 11–0 in 1993 and won its first two games of 1994 under Terry Bowden, 23–9 going into the final period, but lost 30–26 when Auburn returned three interceptions for touchdowns in the fourth quarter. Auburn won despite not scoring an offensive touchdown; its other touchdown came on a fumble return.

LSU lost six of seven after the collapse at Auburn. The lone win during the unsuccessful stretch was a four-point squeaker vs. a terrible Kentucky squad which lost 10 straight after defeating Louisville in its opener.

Hallman's last home game as LSU coach came against his former employer, Southern Mississippi. Hallman was named LSU's coach in November 1990 after leading the Golden Eagles to 23 victories over three seasons, mostly on the strength of future Super Bowl winning and Pro Football Hall of Fame quarterback Brett Favre. USM's 20–18 victory came in front of the smallest home crowd at Tiger Stadium since 1974.

Three days after the loss to Southern Miss, LSU announced Hallman's firing. The Tigers closed the season with victories over Tulane and Arkansas, but Hallman still left Baton Rouge with the poorest record (16–28, .364) of any coach in school history.

== Schedule ==
Date	Time	Opponent	Site	TV	Result	Attendance	Source
September 3	7:00 p.m.	No. 15 Texas A&M*	Tiger Stadium; Baton Rouge, LA (rivalry)		L 13–18	75,504	
September 10	7:00 p.m.	Mississippi State	Tiger Stadium; Baton Rouge, LA (rivalry)		W 44–24	63,029	
September 17	11:30 a.m.	at No. 11 Auburn	Jordan-Hare Stadium; Auburn, AL (rivalry)	JPS	L 26–30	84,754	
October 1	7:00 p.m.	South Carolina^{†}	Tiger Stadium; Baton Rouge, LA		L 17–18	63,281	
October 8	11:30 a.m.	at No. 5 Florida	Ben Hill Griffin Stadium; Gainesville, FL (rivalry)	JPS	L 18–42	85,385	
October 15	7:00 p.m.	Kentucky	Tiger Stadium; Baton Rouge, LA		W 17–13	61,764	
October 29	1:30 p.m.	at Ole Miss	Vaught–Hemingway Stadium; Oxford, MS (rivalry)		L 21–34	40,157	
November 5	6:30 p.m.	No. 6 Alabama	Tiger Stadium; Baton Rouge, LA (rivalry)	ESPN	L 17–35	75,453	
November 12	7:00 p.m.	Southern Miss*	Tiger Stadium; Baton Rouge, LA		L 18–20	51,710	
November 19	7:00 p.m.	at Tulane*	Louisiana Superdome; New Orleans, LA (Battle for the Rag)		W 49–25	32,067	
November 26	1:00 p.m.	at Arkansas	War Memorial Stadium; Little Rock, AR (rivalry)		W 30–12	45,633	
*Non-conference game; ^{†}Homecoming; Rankings from AP Poll released prior to the game; All times are in Central time

== Roster ==
1994 LSU Tigers football team roster
Players
Coaches
Offense

Pos.	#	Name	Class
TB	1	Jermaine Sharp	So
SE	2	Eddie Kennison	So
QB	4	Jamie Howard	Jr
SE	5	Eric Smith	Jr
FL	6	Sheddrick Wilson	Jr
QB	12	Casey Taber	Fr
WR	14	Todd Burks	So
QB	17	Melvin Hill	Fr
FB	36	Robert Toomer	Jr
FB	45	Andre Guerin	So
TE	47	David LaFleur	So
C	50	Marcus Carmouche	So
G	62	Mark King	Jr
G	66	Alan Faneca	Fr
C	67	Mike Blanchard	Sr
G	68	Ben Bordelon	So
OT	71	Tom Turner	Jr
OT	74	Sean Wells	So
G	76	Adam Perry	Fr
OT	79	Marcus Price	Sr
WR	87	Brett Bech	Sr
TE	89	Chris Hill	Jr

Defense

Pos.	#	Name	Class
FS	3	Ivory Hilliard	Sr
DE	7	James Gillyard	Jr
CB	8	Tory James	Jr
CB	11	Gary Pegues	Sr
CB	15	Troy Twillie	Fr
CB	24	Denard Walker	So
LB	30	Bobby Williams	Sr
SS	31	John Bell	Jr
DB	33	Raion Hill	Fr
CB	42	Rodney Young	Sr
LB	43	Allen Stansberry	So
LB	44	Kimojha Brooks	Jr
DE	46	Robert Deshotel (injured)	Sr
DT	55	Chuck Wiley	Fr
LB	56	Mike Calais	So
DE	57	Kenny Mixon	Fr
DT	75	David Carmona	Fr
LB	82	Pat Rogers	So
DE	88	Gabe Northern	Jr
LB	99	Eric Valentino	So

Special teams

Pos.	#	Name	Class
P	80	Chad Kessler	Fr
PK	23	Andre LaFleur	Jr
PK	16	Wade Richey	Fr
P	31	Mark Walker	Fr

Head coach

- Curley Hallman (4th season)

Coordinators/assistant coaches

- Lynn Amedee – Offensive coordinator/quarterbacks
- Steve Buckley – Running backs
- Larry Edmonson – Wide receiver
- Rick Villarreal – Tight ends
- Larry Zierlein – Offensive line
- Phil Bennett – Defensive coordinator/defensive backs
- Lee Fobbs – Defensive ends
- Pete Fredenburg – Defensive tackles
- Jerry Baldwin – Linebackers
- Jay Hopson – Graduate assistant

Legend

- (C) Team captain
- (S) Suspended
- (I) Ineligible
- Injured
- Redshirt

Roster
