= 1994 Auburn Tigers football team =

American college football season

1994 Auburn Tigers football
- Conference: Southeastern Conference
- Western Division

Ranking
- AP: No. 9
- Record: 9–1–1 (6–1–1 SEC)
- Head coach: Terry Bowden (2nd season)
- Offensive coordinator: Tommy Bowden (4th season)
- Defensive coordinator: Wayne Hall (9th season)
- Home stadium: Jordan–Hare Stadium

1994 Southeastern Conference football standings
	Conf.					Overall
Team	W		L		T	W		L		T
Eastern Division
No. 7 Florida x$	7	–	1	–	0	10	–	2	–	1
No. 22 Tennessee	5	–	3	–	0	8	–	4	–	0
South Carolina	4	–	4	–	0	7	–	5	–	0
Georgia	3	–	4	–	1	6	–	4	–	1
Vanderbilt	2	–	6	–	0	5	–	6	–	0
Kentucky	0	–	8	–	0	1	–	10	–	0
Western Division
No. 5 Alabama x	8	–	0	–	0	12	–	1	–	0
No. 9 Auburn	6	–	1	–	1	9	–	1	–	1
No. 24 Mississippi State	5	–	3	–	0	8	–	4	–	0
LSU	3	–	5	–	0	4	–	7	–	0
Arkansas	2	–	6	–	0	4	–	7	–	0
Ole Miss	2	–	6	–	0	4	–	7	–	0
Championship: Florida 24, Alabama 23
$ – Conference champion; x – Division champion/co-champions; Rankings from AP Poll

The 1994 Auburn Tigers football team represented Auburn University in the 1994 NCAA Division I-A football season. Led by second-year head coach Terry Bowden, they continued the success of the previous season by going 9–1–1. Some of Auburn's wins came in dramatic fashion. The Tigers made five interceptions in the 4th quarter against LSU and completed a last-second pass to beat Florida in Gainesville. Auburn won their first nine games of the season to extend a winning streak extending from 1993 to 20 games before ending the year with a tie against Georgia and a loss to Alabama. Auburn returned to television this season, but was still serving a postseason ban that made them ineligible for a bowl game.

== Schedule ==
Date	Time	Opponent	Rank	Site	TV	Result	Attendance	Source
September 3	11:30 a.m.	at Ole Miss	No. 12	Vaught–Hemingway Stadium; Oxford, MS (rivalry)	JPS	W 22–17	41,239	
September 10	6:00 p.m.	Northeast Louisiana*	No. 12	Jordan-Hare Stadium; Auburn, AL		W 44–12	78,437	
September 17	11:30 a.m.	LSU	No. 11	Jordan-Hare Stadium; Auburn, AL (rivalry)	JPS	W 30–26	84,754	
September 24	1:00 p.m.	East Tennessee State*	No. 10	Jordan-Hare Stadium; Auburn, AL		W 38–0	76,341	
September 29	6:45 p.m.	Kentucky	No. 9	Jordan-Hare Stadium; Auburn, AL	ESPN	W 41–14	74,315	
October 8	2:30 p.m.	at Mississippi State	No. 9	Scott Field; Starkville, MS	ABC	W 42–18	41,200	
October 15	12:00 p.m.	at No. 1 Florida	No. 6	Ben Hill Griffin Stadium; Gainesville, FL (rivalry)	ABC	W 36–33	85,562	
October 29	11:30 a.m.	Arkansas	No. 4	Jordan-Hare Stadium; Auburn, AL	JPS	W 31–14	85,214	
November 5	1:00 p.m.	East Carolina*	No. 3	Jordan-Hare Stadium; Auburn, AL	PPV	W 38–21	84,738	
November 12	6:00 p.m.	Georgia	No. 3	Jordan-Hare Stadium; Auburn, AL (Deep South's Oldest Rivalry)	ESPN	T 23–23	85,214	
November 19	2:30 p.m.	at No. 4 Alabama	No. 6	Legion Field; Birmingham, AL (Iron Bowl College GameDay)	ABC	L 14–21	83,091	
*Non-conference game; Rankings from AP Poll released prior to the game; All times are in Central time

== Roster ==
1994 Auburn Tigers football team roster
Players
Coaches
Offense

Pos.	#	Name	Class
WR	18	Thomas Bailey	Sr
QB	11	Allen Barnett	So
RB	48	Stephen Davis	Jr
QB	10	Patrick Nix	Jr

Defense

Pos.	#	Name	Class
LB	59	Toby Anderson	Jr
LB	61	Eric Reebals	Jr
LB	46	John Kolen	Jr

Special teams

Pos.	#	Name	Class

Head coach

- Terry Bowden

Coordinators/assistant coaches

- Jimbo Fisher – Quarterbacks

Legend

- (C) Team captain
- (S) Suspended
- (I) Ineligible
- Injured
- Redshirt

Roster
