= 1994 South Carolina Gamecocks football team =

American college football season

1994 South Carolina Gamecocks football

Carquest Bowl champion

Carquest Bowl, W 24–21 vs. West Virginia
- Conference: Southeastern Conference
- Eastern Division
- Record: 7–5 (4–4 SEC)
- Head coach: Brad Scott (1st season)
- Offensive coordinator: Rickey Bustle (1st season)
- Defensive coordinator: Wally Burnham (1st season)
- Home stadium: Williams–Brice Stadium

1994 Southeastern Conference football standings
| | Conf. | | | | | Overall |
| Team | W | | L | | T | W | | L | | T |
|---|---|---|---|---|---|---|---|---|---|---|
Eastern Division
| No. 7 Florida x$ | 7 | – | 1 | – | 0 | 10 | – | 2 | – | 1 |
| No. 22 Tennessee | 5 | – | 3 | – | 0 | 8 | – | 4 | – | 0 |
| South Carolina | 4 | – | 4 | – | 0 | 7 | – | 5 | – | 0 |
| Georgia | 3 | – | 4 | – | 1 | 6 | – | 4 | – | 1 |
| Vanderbilt | 2 | – | 6 | – | 0 | 5 | – | 6 | – | 0 |
| Kentucky | 0 | – | 8 | – | 0 | 1 | – | 10 | – | 0 |
Western Division
| No. 5 Alabama x | 8 | – | 0 | – | 0 | 12 | – | 1 | – | 0 |
| No. 9 Auburn | 6 | – | 1 | – | 1 | 9 | – | 1 | – | 1 |
| No. 24 Mississippi State | 5 | – | 3 | – | 0 | 8 | – | 4 | – | 0 |
| LSU | 3 | – | 5 | – | 0 | 4 | – | 7 | – | 0 |
| Arkansas | 2 | – | 6 | – | 0 | 4 | – | 7 | – | 0 |
| Ole Miss | 2 | – | 6 | – | 0 | 4 | – | 7 | – | 0 |
Championship: Florida 24, Alabama 23
$ – Conference champion; x – Division champion/co-champions; Rankings from AP Poll

The 1994 South Carolina Gamecocks football team represented the University of South Carolina in the Southeastern Conference (SEC) during the 1994 NCAA Division I-A football season. The Gamecocks were led by first-year head coach Brad Scott and played their home games in Williams–Brice Stadium in Columbia, South Carolina.

With 48 upperclassmen returning, Scott's new pass-heavy offense, and decorated junior quarterback Steve Taneyhill, the Gamecocks went 6–5 in the regular season. This included a win over rival Clemson, only the second in seven seasons. Going into the 1995 Carquest Bowl against West Virginia, South Carolina had an all-time record of 0–8 in postseason games. The Gamecocks defeated the Mountaineers with a final score of 24–21, winning the first bowl game in school history. It was South Carolina's first winning season since 1990 and the seven wins were the most since 1988.

== Schedule ==
| Date | Time | Opponent | Site | TV | Result | Attendance | Source |
|---|---|---|---|---|---|---|---|
| September 3 | 8:00 p.m. | Georgia | Williams–Brice Stadium; Columbia, SC (rivalry) | WIS | L 21–24 | 73,605 | |
| September 10 | 7:00 p.m. | Arkansas | Williams–Brice Stadium; Columbia, SC | PPV | W 14–0 | 71,542 | |
| September 17 | 7:00 p.m. | Louisiana Tech* | Williams–Brice Stadium; Columbia, SC | | W 31–6 | 68,498 | |
| September 24 | 7:00 p.m. | at Kentucky | Commonwealth Stadium; Lexington, KY | PPV | W 23–9 | 56,900 | |
| October 1 | 8:00 p.m. | at LSU | Tiger Stadium; Baton Rouge, LA | PPV | W 18–17 | 63,281 | |
| October 8 | 1:00 p.m. | East Carolina* | Williams–Brice Stadium; Columbia, SC | | L 42–56 | 70,075 | |
| October 15 | 1:00 p.m. | Mississippi State | Williams–Brice Stadium; Columbia, SC | | L 36–41 | 64,902 | |
| October 22 | 12:30 p.m. | at Vanderbilt | Vanderbilt Stadium; Nashville, TN | JPS | W 19–16 | 30,419 | |
| October 29 | 1:00 p.m. | Tennessee | Williams–Brice Stadium; Columbia, SC (rivalry) | PPV | L 22–31 | 74,200 | |
| November 12 | 12:30 p.m. | at No. 4 Florida | Ben Hill Griffin Stadium; Gainesville, FL | JPS | L 17–48 | 85,028 | |
| November 19 | 12:00 p.m. | at Clemson* | Memorial Stadium; Clemson, SC (rivalry) | JPS | W 33–7 | 85,872 | |
| January 2 | 1:30 p.m. | vs. West Virginia* | Joe Robbie Stadium; Miami Gardens, FL (Carquest Bowl) | CBS | W 24–21 | 50,833 | |
*Non-conference game; Rankings from AP Poll released prior to the game; All times are in Eastern time
