= 1994 Ole Miss Rebels football team =

American college football season

1994 Ole Miss Rebels football
- Conference: Southeastern Conference
- Western Division
- Record: 4–7 (2–6 SEC)
- Head coach: Joe Lee Dunn (interim; 1st season)
- Offensive coordinator: Larry Kueck (1st season)
- Offensive scheme: Multiple
- Base defense: 3–3–5
- Captains: Alundis Brice; Jerry Graeber; Abdul Jackson; Jeff Miller; Josh Nelson
- Home stadium: Vaught–Hemingway Stadium

1994 Southeastern Conference football standings
| | Conf. | | | | | Overall |
| Team | W | | L | | T | W | | L | | T |
|---|---|---|---|---|---|---|---|---|---|---|
Eastern Division
| No. 7 Florida x$ | 7 | – | 1 | – | 0 | 10 | – | 2 | – | 1 |
| No. 22 Tennessee | 5 | – | 3 | – | 0 | 8 | – | 4 | – | 0 |
| South Carolina | 4 | – | 4 | – | 0 | 7 | – | 5 | – | 0 |
| Georgia | 3 | – | 4 | – | 1 | 6 | – | 4 | – | 1 |
| Vanderbilt | 2 | – | 6 | – | 0 | 5 | – | 6 | – | 0 |
| Kentucky | 0 | – | 8 | – | 0 | 1 | – | 10 | – | 0 |
Western Division
| No. 5 Alabama x | 8 | – | 0 | – | 0 | 12 | – | 1 | – | 0 |
| No. 9 Auburn | 6 | – | 1 | – | 1 | 9 | – | 1 | – | 1 |
| No. 24 Mississippi State | 5 | – | 3 | – | 0 | 8 | – | 4 | – | 0 |
| LSU | 3 | – | 5 | – | 0 | 4 | – | 7 | – | 0 |
| Arkansas | 2 | – | 6 | – | 0 | 4 | – | 7 | – | 0 |
| Ole Miss | 2 | – | 6 | – | 0 | 4 | – | 7 | – | 0 |
Championship: Florida 24, Alabama 23
$ – Conference champion; x – Division champion/co-champions; Rankings from AP Poll

The 1994 Ole Miss Rebels football team represented the University of Mississippi during the 1994 NCAA Division I-A football season. The Rebels were led by interim coach Joe Lee Dunn and played their home games at Vaught–Hemingway Stadium in Oxford, Mississippi. They competed as members of the Southeastern Conference, finishing last in the Western Division with a 2-6 conference record (the Rebels lost to Arkansas, which also went 2-6 in conference play) and a 4-7 overall mark.

Dunn was promoted on July 13 following the termination of predecessor Billy Brewer, who was cited for numerous NCAA rule violations by Chancellor Gerald Turner and athletic director Warner Alford. The charges were proven true by the NCAA Committee on Infractions in October, leading to severe punishment which included a one-year television ban, a two-year bowl ban, and the loss of 25 total scholarships during the 1995 and 1996 recruiting cycles.

This season was the first since 1963 in which Ole Miss did not play at Mississippi Veterans Memorial Stadium in Jackson.

== Schedule ==
| Date | Opponent | Site | TV | Result | Attendance | Source |
|---|---|---|---|---|---|---|
| September 3 | No. 12 Auburn | Vaught–Hemingway Stadium; Oxford, MS (rivalry) | JPS | L 17–22 | 41,239 | |
| September 10 | Southern Illinois* | Vaught–Hemingway Stadium; Oxford, MS | | W 59–3 | 25,137 | |
| September 17 | at Vanderbilt | Vanderbilt Stadium; Nashville, TN (rivalry) | | W 20–14 | 29,865 | |
| September 24 | at Georgia | Sanford Stadium; Athens, GA | | L 14–17 | 82,934 | |
| October 1 | No. 1 Florida | Vaught–Hemingway Stadium; Oxford, MS | JPS | L 14–38 | 38,360 | |
| October 15 | at Arkansas | Razorback Stadium; Fayetteville, AR (rivalry) | | L 7–31 | 50,100 | |
| October 22 | at No. 8 Alabama | Bryant–Denny Stadium; Tuscaloosa, AL (rivalry) | ABC | L 10–21 | 70,123 | |
| October 29 | LSU^{†} | Vaught–Hemingway Stadium; Oxford, MS (rivalry) | | W 34–21 | 40,157 | |
| November 5 | Memphis* | Vaught–Hemingway Stadium; Oxford, MS (rivalry) | | L 16–17 | 25,511 | |
| November 12 | at Tulane* | Louisiana Superdome; New Orleans, LA (rivalry) | | W 38–0 | 25,044 | |
| November 26 | No. 19 Mississippi State | Vaught–Hemingway Stadium; Oxford, MS (Egg Bowl) | | L 17–21 | 36,521 | |
*Non-conference game; ^{†}Homecoming; Rankings from AP Poll released prior to the game

== Roster ==
1994 Ole Miss Rebels football team roster
| Players | | | Coaches |
|---|---|---|---|
| Offense: Pos. / # / Name / Class | Defense: Pos. / # / Name / Class; LB / / Abdul Jackson | Special teams: Pos. / # / Name / Class | Head coach: Joe Lee Dunn; Coordinators/assistant coaches: Keith Daniels (Running backs coach); Legend: (C) Team captain; (S) Suspended; (I) Ineligible; Injured; Redshirt |
