= Mike Hamilton (athletic director) =

American athletic director (1963–2023)

Mike Hamilton (August 13, 1963 – November 10, 2023) was an American athletic director. He was the Men's Director of Athletics at the University of Tennessee. Hamilton replaced Doug Dickey in 2003, becoming the University of Tennessee's seventh men's athletic director.

== Career ==
Born in Brevard, North Carolina, on August 16, 1963, Hamilton was a graduate of Clemson University, and had been on the university's athletic staff for 11 years prior to his hiring.

In 1998, the National Association of Athletic Development Directors named him Fundraiser of the Year.

== Death ==
Hamilton died from cancer on November 10, 2023, at the age of 60.
