= 1994 Kentucky Wildcats football team =

American college football season

1994 Kentucky Wildcats football
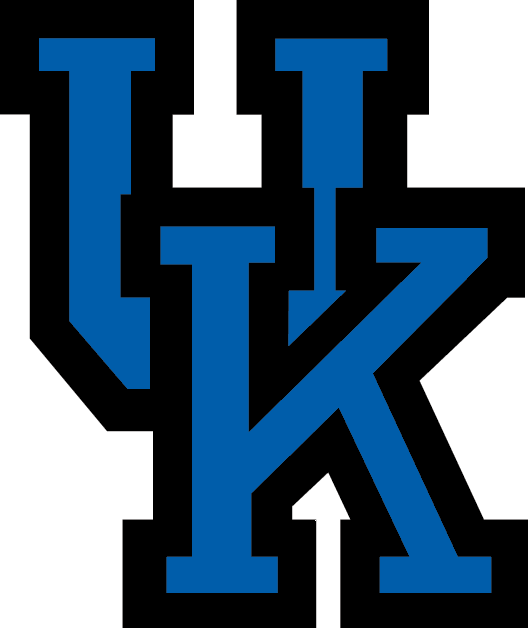
- Conference: Southeastern Conference
- Eastern Division
- Record: 1–10 (0–8 SEC)
- Head coach: Bill Curry (5th season)
- Offensive coordinator: Daryl Dickey (2nd season)
- Offensive scheme: Multiple
- Defensive coordinator: Mike Archer (2nd season)
- Base defense: 4–3
- Home stadium: Commonwealth Stadium

1994 Southeastern Conference football standings
	Conf.					Overall
Team	W		L		T	W		L		T
Eastern Division
No. 7 Florida x$	7	–	1	–	0	10	–	2	–	1
No. 22 Tennessee	5	–	3	–	0	8	–	4	–	0
South Carolina	4	–	4	–	0	7	–	5	–	0
Georgia	3	–	4	–	1	6	–	4	–	1
Vanderbilt	2	–	6	–	0	5	–	6	–	0
Kentucky	0	–	8	–	0	1	–	10	–	0
Western Division
No. 5 Alabama x	8	–	0	–	0	12	–	1	–	0
No. 9 Auburn	6	–	1	–	1	9	–	1	–	1
No. 24 Mississippi State	5	–	3	–	0	8	–	4	–	0
LSU	3	–	5	–	0	4	–	7	–	0
Arkansas	2	–	6	–	0	4	–	7	–	0
Ole Miss	2	–	6	–	0	4	–	7	–	0
Championship: Florida 24, Alabama 23
$ – Conference champion; x – Division champion/co-champions; Rankings from AP Poll

The 1994 Kentucky Wildcats football team represented the University of Kentucky in the Southeastern Conference (SEC) during the 1994 NCAA Division I-A football season. In their fifth season under head coach Bill Curry, the Wildcats compiled a 1–10 record (0–8 against SEC opponents), finished in last place in the Eastern Division of the SEC, and were outscored by their opponents, 405 to 149.

The team won its season opener against Louisville (20–14), but then lost the final ten games of the season, including blowout losses to Florida (73–7), Indiana (59–29), Mississippi State (47–7), and Tennessee (52–0), as well as an embarrassing 21–14 home loss to Division I-A newcomer Northeast Louisiana. The Wildcats also blew a 10–0 lead vs. LSU and lost 17–13, the Tigers' only win over an eight-game stretch which led to the firing of coach Curley Hallman.

The team played its home games in Commonwealth Stadium in Lexington, Kentucky.

This was the Wildcats' worst season since going 0–10–1 in 1982, their first under Curry's predecessor, Jerry Claiborne. They would not lose 10 games in a season until back-to-back 2–10 campaigns in 2012 and 2013 (the NCAA first allowed a 12th regular season game in 2002; the rule was made permanent in 2006).

The team's statistical leaders included Antonio O'Ferral with 642 passing yards, Moe Williams with 805 rushing yards, and Leon Smith with 375 receiving yards.

== Schedule ==
Date	Time	Opponent	Site	TV	Result	Attendance	Source
September 3	7:00 p.m.	Louisville*	Commonwealth Stadium; Lexington, KY (Governor's Cup)		W 20–14	59,162	
September 10	3:30 p.m.	at No. 2 Florida	Ben Hill Griffin Stadium; Gainesville, FL (rivalry)	ABC	L 7–73	85,238	
September 17	7:00 p.m.	Indiana*	Commonwealth Stadium; Lexington, KY (rivalry)		L 29–59	57,825	
September 24	7:00 p.m.	South Carolina	Commonwealth Stadium; Lexington, KY	PPV	L 9–23	56,900	
September 29	7:00 p.m.	at No. 9 Auburn	Jordan-Hare Stadium; Auburn, AL	ESPN	L 14–41	74,315	
October 15	8:00 p.m.	at LSU	Tiger Stadium; Baton Rouge, LA		L 13–17	61,764	
October 22	7:00 p.m.	Georgia	Commonwealth Stadium; Lexington, KY		L 30–34	56,125	
October 29	7:00 p.m.	Mississippi State	Commonwealth Stadium; Lexington, KY		L 7–47	49,500	
November 5	1:00 p.m.	at Vanderbilt	Vanderbilt Stadium; Nashville, TN (rivalry)		L 6–24	40,500	
November 12	1:00 p.m.	Northeast Louisiana*	Commonwealth Stadium; Lexington, KY		L 14–21	32,000	
November 19	12:30 p.m.	Tennessee	Neyland Stadium; Knoxville, TN (rivalry)	JPS	L 0–52	95,066	
*Non-conference game; Rankings from AP Poll released prior to the game; All times are in Eastern time

== Roster ==
1994 Kentucky Wildcats football team roster
Players
Coaches
Offense

Pos.	#	Name	Class
[[American football positions|]]
[[American football positions|]]

Defense

Pos.	#	Name	Class
[[American football positions|]]

Special teams

Pos.	#	Name	Class

}}

Head coach

- [[]]

Coordinators/assistant coaches

Legend

- (C) Team captain
- (S) Suspended
- (I) Ineligible
- Injured
- Redshirt
