= 1994 Georgia Bulldogs football team =

American college football season

1994 Georgia Bulldogs football
- Conference: Southeastern Conference
- Eastern Division
- Record: 6–4–1 (3–4–1 SEC)
- Head coach: Ray Goff (6th season)
- Offensive coordinator: Wayne McDuffie (4th season)
- Offensive scheme: No-huddle spread
- Defensive coordinator: Marion Campbell (1st season)
- Base defense: 3–4
- Home stadium: Sanford Stadium

1994 Southeastern Conference football standings
	Conf.					Overall
Team	W		L		T	W		L		T
Eastern Division
No. 7 Florida x$	7	–	1	–	0	10	–	2	–	1
No. 22 Tennessee	5	–	3	–	0	8	–	4	–	0
South Carolina	4	–	4	–	0	7	–	5	–	0
Georgia	3	–	4	–	1	6	–	4	–	1
Vanderbilt	2	–	6	–	0	5	–	6	–	0
Kentucky	0	–	8	–	0	1	–	10	–	0
Western Division
No. 5 Alabama x	8	–	0	–	0	12	–	1	–	0
No. 9 Auburn	6	–	1	–	1	9	–	1	–	1
No. 24 Mississippi State	5	–	3	–	0	8	–	4	–	0
LSU	3	–	5	–	0	4	–	7	–	0
Arkansas	2	–	6	–	0	4	–	7	–	0
Ole Miss	2	–	6	–	0	4	–	7	–	0
Championship: Florida 24, Alabama 23
$ – Conference champion; x – Division champion/co-champions; Rankings from AP Poll

The 1994 Georgia Bulldogs football team represented the University of Georgia as a member of the Eastern Division of the Southeastern Conference (SEC) during the 1994 NCAA Division I-A football season. Led by sixth-year head coach Ray Goff, the Bulldogs compiled an overall record of 6–4–1, with a mark of 3–4–1 in conference play, and finished fourth in the SEC Eastern Division.

== Schedule ==
Date	Time	Opponent	Rank	Site	TV	Result	Attendance	Source
September 3	8:00 p.m.	at South Carolina		Williams–Brice Stadium; Columbia, SC (rivalry)		W 24–21	73,605	
September 10	7:00 p.m.	No. 19 Tennessee	No. 23	Sanford Stadium; Athens, GA (rivalry)	ESPN	L 23–41	86,117	
September 17	1:00 p.m.	Northeast Louisiana*		Sanford Stadium; Athens, GA		W 70–6	70,611	
September 24	1:00 p.m.	Ole Miss		Sanford Stadium; Athens, GA		W 17–14	82,734	
October 1	7:30 p.m.	at No. 11 Alabama		Bryant–Denny Stadium; Tuscaloosa, AL (rivalry)	ESPN	L 28–29	70,123	
October 8	12:00 p.m.	Clemson*		Sanford Stadium; Athens, GA (rivalry)	ABC	W 40–14	86,117	
October 15	12:30 p.m.	Vanderbilt^{†}		Sanford Stadium; Athens, GA (rivalry)	JPS	L 30–43	78,741	
October 22	7:00 p.m.	at Kentucky		Commonwealth Stadium; Lexington, KY		W 34–30	56,125	
October 29	7:00 p.m.	at No. 5 Florida		Ben Hill Griffin Stadium; Gainesville, FL (rivalry)	ESPN	L 14–52	85,604	
November 12	7:00 p.m.	at No. 3 Auburn		Jordan-Hare Stadium; Auburn, AL (rivalry)	ESPN	T 23–23	85,214	
November 25	4:00 p.m.	Georgia Tech*		Sanford Stadium; Athens, GA (rivalry)	ESPN	W 48–10	84,113	
*Non-conference game; ^{†}Homecoming; Rankings from AP Poll released prior to the game; All times are in Eastern time

== Roster ==
1994 Georgia Bulldogs football team roster
Players			Coaches
Offense: Pos. / # / Name / Class; QB / / Eric Zeier / Sr	Defense: Pos. / # / Name / Class; S / / Will Muschamp / Sr	Special teams: Pos. / # / Name / Class	Head coach: Ray Goff; Coordinators/assistant coaches Legend: (C) Team captain; (S) Suspended; (I) Ineligible; Injured; Redshirt
