= 1994 Florida Gators football team =

American college football season

1994 Florida Gators football

SEC champion SEC Eastern Division champion

SEC Championship Game, W 24–23 vs. Alabama

Sugar Bowl, L 17–23 vs. Florida State
- Conference: Southeastern Conference
- Eastern Division

Ranking
- Coaches: No. 7
- AP: No. 7
- Record: 10–2–1 (7–1 SEC)
- Head coach: Steve Spurrier (5th season)
- Offensive scheme: Fun and gun
- Defensive coordinator: Bob Pruett (1st season)
- Base defense: 3–4
- Captains: Terry Dean; Aubrey Hill; Ellis Johnson; Larry Kennedy; Henry McMillian
- Home stadium: Ben Hill Griffin Stadium

1994 Southeastern Conference football standings
| | Conf. | | | | | Overall |
| Team | W | | L | | T | W | | L | | T |
|---|---|---|---|---|---|---|---|---|---|---|
Eastern Division
| No. 7 Florida x$ | 7 | – | 1 | – | 0 | 10 | – | 2 | – | 1 |
| No. 22 Tennessee | 5 | – | 3 | – | 0 | 8 | – | 4 | – | 0 |
| South Carolina | 4 | – | 4 | – | 0 | 7 | – | 5 | – | 0 |
| Georgia | 3 | – | 4 | – | 1 | 6 | – | 4 | – | 1 |
| Vanderbilt | 2 | – | 6 | – | 0 | 5 | – | 6 | – | 0 |
| Kentucky | 0 | – | 8 | – | 0 | 1 | – | 10 | – | 0 |
Western Division
| No. 5 Alabama x | 8 | – | 0 | – | 0 | 12 | – | 1 | – | 0 |
| No. 9 Auburn | 6 | – | 1 | – | 1 | 9 | – | 1 | – | 1 |
| No. 24 Mississippi State | 5 | – | 3 | – | 0 | 8 | – | 4 | – | 0 |
| LSU | 3 | – | 5 | – | 0 | 4 | – | 7 | – | 0 |
| Arkansas | 2 | – | 6 | – | 0 | 4 | – | 7 | – | 0 |
| Ole Miss | 2 | – | 6 | – | 0 | 4 | – | 7 | – | 0 |
Championship: Florida 24, Alabama 23
$ – Conference champion; x – Division champion/co-champions; Rankings from AP Poll

The 1994 Florida Gators football team represented the University of Florida during the 1994 NCAA Division I-A football season. The season was Steve Spurrier's fifth as the head coach of the Florida Gators football team. Spurrier's 1994 Florida Gators posted an overall record of 10–2–1 and a 7–1 record in the Southeastern Conference (SEC), placing first among the six SEC Eastern Division teams and winning the SEC championship.

== Schedule ==
| Date | Time | Opponent | Rank | Site | TV | Result | Attendance | Source |
|---|---|---|---|---|---|---|---|---|
| September 3 | | New Mexico State* | No. 1 | Ben Hill Griffin Stadium; Gainesville, FL | | W 70–21 | 84,721 | |
| September 10 | 3:30 p.m. | Kentucky | No. 2 | Ben Hill Griffin Stadium; Gainesville, FL (rivalry) | ABC | W 73–7 | 85,238 | |
| September 17 | 6:30 p.m. | at No. 15 Tennessee | No. 1 | Neyland Stadium; Knoxville, TN (rivalry) | ESPN | W 31–0 | 96,656 | |
| October 1 | | at Ole Miss | No. 1 | Vaught–Hemingway Stadium; Oxford, MS | JPS | W 38–14 | 38,360 | |
| October 8 | 12:30 p.m. | LSU | No. 1 | Ben Hill Griffin Stadium; Gainesville, FL (rivalry) | JPS | W 42–18 | 85,385 | |
| October 15 | 1:00 p.m. | No. 6 Auburn | No. 1 | Ben Hill Griffin Stadium; Gainesville, FL (rivalry) | ABC | L 33–36 | 85,562 | |
| October 29 | 7:00 p.m. | Georgia | No. 5 | Ben Hill Griffin Stadium; Gainesville, FL (rivalry) | ESPN | W 52–14 | 85,604 | |
| November 5 | | Southern Miss*^{†} | No. 4 | Ben Hill Griffin Stadium; Gainesville, FL | | W 55–17 | 85,448 | |
| November 12 | 12:30 p.m. | South Carolina | No. 4 | Ben Hill Griffin Stadium; Gainesville, FL | JPS | W 48–17 | 85,028 | |
| November 19 | | at Vanderbilt | No. 3 | Vanderbilt Stadium; Nashville, TN | PPV | W 24–7 | 33,508 | |
| November 26 | 12:00 p.m. | at No. 7 Florida State* | No. 4 | Doak Campbell Stadium; Tallahassee, FL (rivalry) | ABC | T 31–31 | 80,210 | |
| December 3 | 3:30 p.m. | vs. No. 3 Alabama | No. 6 | Georgia Dome; Atlanta, GA (SEC Championship, rivalry) | ABC | W 24–23 | 74,751 | |
| January 2, 1995 | 8:30 p.m. | vs. No. 7 Florida State* | No. 5 | Louisiana Superdome; New Orleans, LA (Sugar Bowl) | ABC | L 17–23 | 76,244 | |
*Non-conference game; ^{†}Homecoming; Rankings from AP Poll released prior to the game; All times are in Eastern time

== Rankings ==
Ranking movements Legend: ██ Increase in ranking ██ Decrease in ranking ( ) = First-place votes
| | Week | | | | | | | | | | | | | | | | |
| Poll | Pre | 1 | 2 | 3 | 4 | 5 | 6 | 7 | 8 | 9 | 10 | 11 | 12 | 13 | 14 | 15 | Final |
|---|---|---|---|---|---|---|---|---|---|---|---|---|---|---|---|---|---|
| AP | 1 (15) | 1 (14) | 2 (15) | 1 (27) | 1 (33) | 1 (31) | 1 (39) | 1 (44) | 5 | 5 | 4 | 4 | 3 | 4 | 6 | 5 | 7 |
| Coaches | 1 (17) | | 2 (23) | 2 (18) | 2 (20) | 2 (22) | 1 (34) | 1 (43) | 6 | 6 | 5 | 5 | 5 | 4 | 6 | 4 | 7 |

== Before the season ==
The Gators were eyeing a national championship.

Florida received verbal commitments the following recruits in 1994: Amp Campbell, Ed Chester, Jaquez Green, Isaac Hilliard, Michael Jackson, Nafis Kareem, Travis McGriff, Jamie Richardson, Dossy Robbins and Deak Story. Amp Campbell was considered to be the best signing of the year as he was a top cornerback prospect and part of USA Today's All-America team.

== Game summaries ==
=== New Mexico State ===
New Mexico State at #1 Florida

| Team | 1 | 2 | 3 | 4 | Total |
|---|---|---|---|---|---|
| Aggies | 7 | 14 | 0 | 0 | 21 |
| • Gators | 28 | 28 | 0 | 14 | 70 |

- Date: September 3
- Location: Ben Hill Griffith Stadium
- Game attendance: 84,721

Scoring summary
| Q1 | FLA | Hillard 6 yard pass from Dean (Davis kick) | FLA 7–0 |
| Q1 | NMS | L. Davis 73 yard pass from Ledbetter (Culin kick) | Tie 7–7 |
| Q1 | FLA | Jackson 13 yard pass from Dean (Davis kick) | FLA 14–7 |
| Q1 | FLA | Jackson 8 yard pass from Dean (Davis kick) | FLA 21–7 |
| Q1 | FLA | Hill 15 yard pass from Dean (Davis kick) | FLA 28–7 |
| Q2 | NMS | L. Davis 27 yard pass from Ledbetter (Culin kick) | FLA 28–14 |
| Q2 | FLA | Palmer 10 yard pass from Dean (Davis kick) | FLA 35—14 |
| Q2 | FLA | Jackson 8 yard pass from Dean (Davis kick) | FLA 42–14 |
| Q2 | NMS | L. Davis 7 yard pass from Ledbetter (Culin kick) | FLA 42–21 |
| Q2 | FLA | Jackson 3 yard pass from Dean (Davis kick) | FLA 49–21 |
| Q2 | FLA | Hillard 7 yard pass from Kresser (Davis kick) | FLA 56–21 |
| Q4 | FLA | Taylor 9 yard run (Davis kick) | FLA 63–21 |
| Q4 | FLA | Malone 13 yard run (Davis kick) | FLA 70–21 |

- Terry Dean tied an NCAA record by throwing for seven touchdowns in the first half.

=== Kentucky ===
Kentucky at #2 Florida

| Team | 1 | 2 | 3 | 4 | Total |
|---|---|---|---|---|---|
| Wildcats | 0 | 7 | 0 | 0 | 7 |
| • Gators | 14 | 17 | 21 | 21 | 73 |

- Date: September 10
- Location: Ben Hill Griffith Stadium
- Game attendance: 85,238

Scoring summary
| Q1 | FLA | Hill 16-yard pass from Dean (Davis kick) | FLA 7–0 |
| Q1 | FLA | Williams 15-yard run (Davis kick) | FLA 14–0 |
| Q2 | FLA | Hill 4-yard pass from Dean (Davis kick) | FLA 21–0 |
| Q2 | KEN | Curtis 36-yard pass from O'Ferral (Sivinski kick) | FLA 21–7 |
| Q2 | FLA | Davis 31-yard field goal | FLA 24–7 |
| Q2 | FLA | Doering 5-yard pass from Dean (Davis kick) | FLA 31–7 |
| Q3 | FLA | Williams 2-yard run (Davis kick) | FLA 38–7 |
| Q3 | FLA | Anthony 65-yard pass from Dean (Davis kick) | FLA 45–7 |
| Q3 | FLA | McCray 33-yard fumble return (Davis kick) | FLA 52–7 |
| Q4 | FLA | Hillard 25-yard pass from Wuerffel (Davis kick) | FLA 59–7 |
| Q4 | FLA | Bowen 15-yard pass from Kresser (Davis kick) | FLA 66–7 |
| Q4 | FLA | Baker 15-yard run (Davis kick) | FLA 73–7 |

- E. Williams 13 Rush, 115 Yds

=== Auburn ===
Coach Terry Bowden's sixth-ranked 1994 Auburn Tigers entered the Swamp as 17-point underdogs to coach Steve Spurrier's top-ranked Gators, but, just like the year before, the Tigers offense kept pace with the Gators as its defense forced key turnovers by the Gators. The Gators' starting quarterback, Terry Dean, threw four interceptions in the first half, and was replaced by Danny Wuerffel, who threw three touchdown passes but was intercepted by Tigers defensive back Brian Robinson with 1:20 left. Tigers quarterback Patrick Nix engineered a quick drive, and threw an eight-yard touchdown pass to Frank Sanders, winning the game for Auburn, 36–33.

=== Florida State ===
#4 Florida at #7 Florida State

| Team | 1 | 2 | 3 | 4 | Total |
|---|---|---|---|---|---|
| Gators | 7 | 17 | 7 | 0 | 31 |
| Seminoles | 3 | 0 | 0 | 28 | 31 |

- Date: November 26
- Location: Doak Campbell Stadium
- Game attendance: 80,210
- Television network: ABC

In the greatest fourth-quarter comeback of the series, the Gators led the Seminoles 31–3 after three quarters. However, the Seminoles scored 28 points in the final fifteen minutes to tie the game at 31–31.

=== Florida State (Sugar Bowl) ===
#7 Florida State vs. #5 Florida

| Team | 1 | 2 | 3 | 4 | Total |
|---|---|---|---|---|---|
| • Seminoles | 3 | 17 | 3 | 0 | 23 |
| Gators | 3 | 7 | 0 | 7 | 17 |

- Date: January 2
- Location: Louisiana Superdome
- Game weather: Indoors (dome)
- TV announcers (ABC): Brent Musburger and Dick Vermeil

The Seminoles then won a rematch in the Sugar Bowl, 23–17, referred to as "The Fifth Quarter in the French Quarter."

== Roster ==
1994 Florida Gators football team roster
Players
Coaches
Offense

| Pos. | # | Name | Class |
|---|---|---|---|
| TE | 91 | Tremayne Allen | Jr |
| WR | 15 | Reidel Anthony | Fr |
| QB | 12 | Terry Dean | Sr |
| WR | 28 | Chris Doering | Jr |
| WR | 5 | Jacquez Green | Fr |
| WR | 19 | Ike Hilliard | Fr |
| WR | 1 | Jack Jackson | Jr |
| QB | 10 | Eric Kresser | So |
| WR | 3 | Travis McGriff | Fr |
| G | 71 | Jeff Mitchell | So |
| OT | 74 | Jason Odom | Jr |
| RB | 21 | Fred Taylor | Fr |
| QB | 7 | Danny Wuerffel | So |

Defense

| Pos. | # | Name | Class |
|---|---|---|---|
| DT | 67 | Mark Campbell | Jr |
| DE | 57 | Kevin Carter | Sr |
| DT | 61 | Ellis Johnson | Sr |
| SS | 4 | Lawrence Wright | So |
| SS | 20 | Sammy McCorkle | Jr |

Special teams

| Pos. | # | Name | Class |

Head coach

- Steve Spurrier

Coordinators/assistant coaches

- Bob Pruett (DC)
- Charlie Strong (AHC/DT)

Legend

- (C) Team captain
- (S) Suspended
- (I) Ineligible
- Injured
- Redshirt
