= 1994 Arkansas Razorbacks football team =

American college football season

1994 Arkansas Razorbacks football
- Conference: Southeastern Conference
- Western Division
- Record: 4–7 (2–6 SEC)
- Head coach: Danny Ford (2nd season)
- Defensive coordinator: Joe Kines (4th season)
- Captains: Jason Allen; Willie Johnson
- Home stadium: Razorback Stadium; War Memorial Stadium

1994 Southeastern Conference football standings
	Conf.					Overall
Team	W		L		T	W		L		T
Eastern Division
No. 7 Florida x$	7	–	1	–	0	10	–	2	–	1
No. 22 Tennessee	5	–	3	–	0	8	–	4	–	0
South Carolina	4	–	4	–	0	7	–	5	–	0
Georgia	3	–	4	–	1	6	–	4	–	1
Vanderbilt	2	–	6	–	0	5	–	6	–	0
Kentucky	0	–	8	–	0	1	–	10	–	0
Western Division
No. 5 Alabama x	8	–	0	–	0	12	–	1	–	0
No. 9 Auburn	6	–	1	–	1	9	–	1	–	1
No. 24 Mississippi State	5	–	3	–	0	8	–	4	–	0
LSU	3	–	5	–	0	4	–	7	–	0
Arkansas	2	–	6	–	0	4	–	7	–	0
Ole Miss	2	–	6	–	0	4	–	7	–	0
Championship: Florida 24, Alabama 23
$ – Conference champion; x – Division champion/co-champions; Rankings from AP Poll

The 1994 Arkansas Razorbacks football team represented the University of Arkansas as a member of the Western Division of the Southeastern Conference (SEC) during the 1994 NCAA Division I-A football season. The team was led by Danny Ford in his second season and finished compiled an overall record of 4–7, with a mark of 2–6 in conference play, and finished tied for fifth place in the SEC Western Division.

== Schedule ==
Date	Time	Opponent	Site	TV	Result	Attendance	Source
September 3	3:00 p.m.	SMU*	War Memorial Stadium; Little Rock, AR		W 34–14	51,810	
September 10	6:00 p.m.	at South Carolina	Williams–Brice Stadium; Columbia, SC		L 0–14	71,542	
September 17	2:30 p.m.	No. 12 Alabama	Razorback Stadium; Fayetteville, AR	ABC	L 6–13	52,089	
September 24	7:00 p.m.	at Memphis*	Liberty Bowl Memorial Stadium; Memphis, TN		L 15–16	34,678	
October 1	3:00 p.m.	Vanderbilt	War Memorial Stadium; Little Rock, AR		W 42–6	51,976	
October 8	12:00 p.m.	at Tennessee	Neyland Stadium; Knoxville, TN	PPV	L 21–38	94,997	
October 15	2:00 p.m.	Ole Miss^{†}	Razorback Stadium; Fayetteville, AR (rivalry)		W 31–7	50,100	
October 29	11:30 a.m.	at No. 4 Auburn	Jordan-Hare Stadium; Auburn, AL	JPS	L 14–31	85,214	
November 5	11:30 a.m.	at No. 24 Mississippi State	Scott Field; Starkville, MS	JPS	L 7–17	35,147	
November 12	1:00 p.m.	Northern Illinois*	Razorback Stadium; Fayetteville, AR		W 30–27	37,568	
November 26	1:00 p.m.	LSU	War Memorial Stadium; Little Rock, AR (rivalry)		L 12–30	45,633	
*Non-conference game; ^{†}Homecoming; Rankings from AP Poll released prior to the game; All times are in Central time

== Roster ==
1994 Arkansas Razorbacks football team roster
Players			Coaches
Offense: Pos. / # / Name / Class; QB / / Barry Lunney Jr. / Jr	Defense: Pos. / # / Name / Class	Special teams: Pos. / # / Name / Class	Head coach: Danny Ford; Coordinators/assistant coaches Legend: (C) Team captain; (S) Suspended; (I) Ineligible; Injured; Redshirt
