= 1994 Mississippi State Bulldogs football team =

American college football season

1994 Mississippi State Bulldogs football

Peach Bowl, L 24–28 vs. NC State
- Conference: Southeastern Conference
- Western Division

Ranking
- Coaches: No. 25
- AP: No. 24
- Record: 8–4 (5–3 SEC)
- Head coach: Jackie Sherrill (4th season)
- Offensive coordinator: Bruce Arians (2nd season)
- Defensive coordinator: Bill Clay (4th season)
- Home stadium: Scott Field

1994 Southeastern Conference football standings
	Conf.					Overall
Team	W		L		T	W		L		T
Eastern Division
No. 7 Florida x$	7	–	1	–	0	10	–	2	–	1
No. 22 Tennessee	5	–	3	–	0	8	–	4	–	0
South Carolina	4	–	4	–	0	7	–	5	–	0
Georgia	3	–	4	–	1	6	–	4	–	1
Vanderbilt	2	–	6	–	0	5	–	6	–	0
Kentucky	0	–	8	–	0	1	–	10	–	0
Western Division
No. 5 Alabama x	8	–	0	–	0	12	–	1	–	0
No. 9 Auburn	6	–	1	–	1	9	–	1	–	1
No. 24 Mississippi State	5	–	3	–	0	8	–	4	–	0
LSU	3	–	5	–	0	4	–	7	–	0
Arkansas	2	–	6	–	0	4	–	7	–	0
Ole Miss	2	–	6	–	0	4	–	7	–	0
Championship: Florida 24, Alabama 23
$ – Conference champion; x – Division champion/co-champions; Rankings from AP Poll

The 1994 Mississippi State Bulldogs football team represented Mississippi State University during the 1994 NCAA Division I-A football season. The team's head coach was Jackie Sherrill. The Bulldogs played their home games in 1994 at Scott Field in Starkville, Mississippi. The Bulldogs finished the season ranked 24th and 25th, respectively, in the AP and Coaches' Polls.

== Schedule ==
Date	Time	Opponent	Rank	Site	TV	Result	Attendance	Source
September 3	7:00 p.m.	at Memphis*		Liberty Bowl Memorial Stadium; Memphis, TN		W 17–6	35,106	
September 10	7:00 p.m.	at LSU		Tiger Stadium; Baton Rouge, LA (rivalry)		L 24–44	63,029	
September 24	11:30 a.m.	No. 23 Tennessee		Scott Field; Starkville, MS	JPS	W 24–21	41,071	
October 1	6:00 p.m.	Arkansas State*		Scott Field; Starkville, MS		W 49–3	30,143	
October 8	2:30 p.m.	No. 9 Auburn		Scott Field; Starkville, MS	ABC	L 18–42	41,200	
October 15	12:00 p.m.	at South Carolina		Williams–Brice Stadium; Columbia, SC		W 41–36	64,902	
October 22	1:30 p.m.	Tulane*		Scott Field; Starkville, MS		W 66–22	30,169	
October 29	6:00 p.m.	at Kentucky		Commonwealth Stadium; Lexington, KY		W 47–7	49,500	
November 5	11:30 a.m.	Arkansas	No. 24	Scott Field; Starkville, MS	JPS	W 17–7	35,147	
November 12	2:30 p.m.	No. 6 Alabama	No. 20	Scott Field; Starkville, MS (rivalry)	ABC	L 25–29	41,358	
November 26	12:30 p.m.	at Ole Miss	No. 19	Vaught–Hemingway Stadium; Oxford, MS (Egg Bowl)		W 21–17	36,521	
January 1	7:00 p.m.	vs. No. 23 NC State*	No. 16	Georgia Dome; Atlanta, GA (Peach Bowl)	ESPN	L 24–28	64,902	
*Non-conference game; Rankings from AP Poll released prior to the game; All times are in Central time
