= Jerry Colquitt =

American football player and coach (born 1972)

Profile
- Position: Quarterback

Personal information
- Born: June 28, 1972 (age 54)
- Listed height: 6 ft 4 in (1.93 m)
- Listed weight: 208 lb (94 kg)

Career information
- College: Tennessee
- NFL draft: 1995: 6th round, 191st overall pick

Career history

Playing
- 1995: Carolina Panthers*
- 1996: Frankfurt Galaxy
- * Offseason or practice squad member only

Coaching
- 1998: Ole Miss (recruiting coord.)
- 1999–2002: Seattle Seahawks (offensive asst./quality control coach)

Jeremiah Juan Colquitt (born June 28, 1972) is an American former football player and coach. He played college football at the University of Tennessee, and was drafted by the Carolina Panthers in the 1995 NFL draft, but did not make the team. He is of no known relation to Colquitt family of punters (Dustin, Britton, Jimmy, and Craig), who also played for Tennessee.

== Early life ==
Colquitt played high school football at Oak Ridge High School in Oak Ridge, Tennessee. During his senior year, he completed 86 of 155 passes for 1,168 yards and 11 touchdowns, and was named All-State. As the Wildcats' starting quarterback, he led the team to consecutive 12-1 seasons during his junior and senior years.

== College career ==
Colquitt signed with Tennessee in 1990 under head coach Johnny Majors, but redshirted his first year. During the 1991 season, he was a backup to veteran quarterback Andy Kelly. He began the 1992 season competing for the starting quarterback slot, but was edged out by Heath Shuler.

When Shuler entered the NFL draft following his junior season, Colquitt became Tennessee's starting quarterback, leading a quarterback corps that included future Colorado Rockies baseball All-Star Todd Helton, future Hall-of-Famer Peyton Manning, and future Texas A&M quarterback Branndon Stewart. Seven plays into his first start against UCLA, however, Colquitt suffered a season-ending knee injury. Tennessee tried to persuade the NCAA to restore Colquitt's final year of eligibility, but the request was denied. During his collegiate career, Colquitt completed 39 of 64 passes for 477 yards, five touchdowns, and an interception.

=== Collegiate statistics ===
Season	Team	Passing								
Season	Team	Cmp	Att	Pct	Yds	Avg	AY/A	TD	Int	Rtg
1991	Tennessee	1	1	100.0	31	31.0	31.0	0	0	360.4
1992	Tennessee	16	33	48.5	190	5.8	6.4	1	0	106.8
1993	Tennessee	19	26	73.1	233	9.0	10.3	4	1	191.4
1994	Tennessee	3	4	75.0	23	5.8	5.8	0	0	123.3
Career		39	64	60.9	477	7.5	8.3	5	1	146.2

== Professional career ==
Despite his limited playing time in college, Colquitt was selected by the Carolina Panthers in the sixth round (191st overall pick) of the 1995 NFL draft. He was waived by the team on August 23, 1995. Colquitt was a member of the Frankfurt Galaxy of the World League of American Football in 1996, but did not appear in any games for the team.

== Post-playing career ==
In 1998, Colquitt was hired by his former offensive coordinator at Tennessee, David Cutcliffe, as recruiting coordinator at Ole Miss. In 1999, he was promoted to director of recruiting. He left Mississippi two months later to become an offensive assistant and quality control coach with the Seattle Seahawks. He was let go by the team following the 2002 season.
