= 1994 Vanderbilt Commodores football team =

American college football season

1994 Vanderbilt Commodores football
- Conference: Southeastern Conference
- Record: 5–6 (2–6 SEC)
- Head coach: Gerry DiNardo (4th season)
- Offensive coordinator: Don Frease (4th season)
- Offensive scheme: I-formation
- Defensive coordinator: Carl Reese (4th season)
- Base defense: Multiple
- Home stadium: Vanderbilt Stadium

1994 Southeastern Conference football standings
	Conf.					Overall
Team	W		L		T	W		L		T
Eastern Division
No. 7 Florida x$	7	–	1	–	0	10	–	2	–	1
No. 22 Tennessee	5	–	3	–	0	8	–	4	–	0
South Carolina	4	–	4	–	0	7	–	5	–	0
Georgia	3	–	4	–	1	6	–	4	–	1
Vanderbilt	2	–	6	–	0	5	–	6	–	0
Kentucky	0	–	8	–	0	1	–	10	–	0
Western Division
No. 5 Alabama x	8	–	0	–	0	12	–	1	–	0
No. 9 Auburn	6	–	1	–	1	9	–	1	–	1
No. 24 Mississippi State	5	–	3	–	0	8	–	4	–	0
LSU	3	–	5	–	0	4	–	7	–	0
Arkansas	2	–	6	–	0	4	–	7	–	0
Ole Miss	2	–	6	–	0	4	–	7	–	0
Championship: Florida 24, Alabama 23
$ – Conference champion; x – Division champion/co-champions; Rankings from AP Poll

The 1994 Vanderbilt Commodores football team represented Vanderbilt University as a member of the Eastern Division of the Southeastern Conference (SEC) during the 1994 NCAA Division I-A football season. Led by Gerry DiNardo in his fourth and final season as head coach, the Commodores compiled an overall record of 5–6 with a mark of 2–6 in conference play, placing fifth in the SEC's Eastern Division. The team played home games at Vanderbilt Stadium in Nashville, Tennessee.

DiNardo left the Commodores two weeks after the season concluded to become head coach for SEC rival LSU.

== Schedule ==
Date	Opponent	Site	Result	Attendance	Source
September 3	Wake Forest*	Vanderbilt Stadium; Nashville, TN	W 35–14	31,203	
September 10	at No. 11 Alabama	Bryant–Denny Stadium; Tuscaloosa, AL	L 7–17	70,123	
September 17	Ole Miss	Vanderbilt Stadium; Nashville, TN (rivalry)	L 14–20	29,685	
October 1	at Arkansas	War Memorial Stadium; Little Rock, AR	L 6–42	51,976	
October 8	at Cincinnati*	Nippert Stadium; Cincinnati, OH	W 34–24	15,875	
October 15	at Georgia	Sanford Stadium; Athens, GA (rivalry)	W 43–30	78,741	
October 22	South Carolina	Vanderbilt Stadium; Nashville, TN	L 16–19	30,419	
October 29	Northern Illinois*	Vanderbilt Stadium; Nashville, TN	W 17–16	22,196	
November 5	at Kentucky	Commonwealth Stadium; Lexington, KY (rivalry)	W 24–6	40,500	
November 19	No. 3 Florida	Vanderbilt Stadium; Nashville, TN	L 7–24	33,508	
November 26	Tennessee	Vanderbilt Stadium; Nashville, TN (rivalry)	L 0–65	38,816	
*Non-conference game; Rankings from AP Poll released prior to the game
