= 1994 Alabama Crimson Tide football team =

American college football season

1994 Alabama Crimson Tide football

SEC Western Division champion Citrus Bowl champion

SEC Championship Game, L 23–24 vs. Florida

Florida Citrus Bowl, W 24–17 vs. Ohio State
- Conference: Southeastern Conference
- Western Division

Ranking
- Coaches: No. 4
- AP: No. 5
- Record: 12–1 (8–0 SEC)
- Head coach: Gene Stallings (5th season)
- Offensive coordinator: Homer Smith (1st season)
- Offensive scheme: Pro-style
- Defensive coordinator: Bill Oliver (2nd season)
- Base defense: 3–4 or 4–3
- Captains: Jay Barker; Tarrant Lynch; Tommy Johnson; Sam Shade
- Home stadium: Bryant–Denny Stadium; Legion Field

1994 Southeastern Conference football standings
	Conf.					Overall
Team	W		L		T	W		L		T
Eastern Division
No. 7 Florida x$	7	–	1	–	0	10	–	2	–	1
No. 22 Tennessee	5	–	3	–	0	8	–	4	–	0
South Carolina	4	–	4	–	0	7	–	5	–	0
Georgia	3	–	4	–	1	6	–	4	–	1
Vanderbilt	2	–	6	–	0	5	–	6	–	0
Kentucky	0	–	8	–	0	1	–	10	–	0
Western Division
No. 5 Alabama x	8	–	0	–	0	12	–	1	–	0
No. 9 Auburn	6	–	1	–	1	9	–	1	–	1
No. 24 Mississippi State	5	–	3	–	0	8	–	4	–	0
LSU	3	–	5	–	0	4	–	7	–	0
Arkansas	2	–	6	–	0	4	–	7	–	0
Ole Miss	2	–	6	–	0	4	–	7	–	0
Championship: Florida 24, Alabama 23
$ – Conference champion; x – Division champion/co-champions; Rankings from AP Poll

The 1994 Alabama Crimson Tide football team represented the University of Alabama for the 1994 NCAA Division I-A football season, competing in the Western Division in the Southeastern Conference. Gene Stallings led the Crimson Tide to a perfect 11–0 regular season, only to see the Crimson Tide lose to the Florida Gators by one point in the SEC Championship Game. Highlights include a win over then unbeaten Auburn, and a dramatic victory over Georgia which is rebroadcast occasionally as part of the ESPN "Classic" series. Alabama beat Ohio State in the 1995 Florida Citrus Bowl to finish their 1994 season with a 12–1 record.

The team played their home games at Bryant–Denny Stadium in Tuscaloosa, Alabama, and Legion Field in Birmingham, Alabama.

== Schedule ==
Date	Time	Opponent	Rank	Site	TV	Result	Attendance	Source
September 3	4:00 p.m.	Chattanooga*	No. 11	Legion Field; Birmingham, AL	PPV	W 42–13	82,109	
September 10	11:30 a.m.	Vanderbilt	No. 11	Bryant–Denny Stadium; Tuscaloosa, AL	JPS	W 17–7	70,123	
September 17	2:30 p.m.	at Arkansas	No. 12	Razorback Stadium; Fayetteville, AR	ABC	W 13–6	52,089	
September 24	2:30 p.m.	Tulane*	No. 11	Legion Field; Birmingham, AL	PPV	W 20–10	81,421	
October 1	6:30 p.m.	Georgia	No. 11	Bryant–Denny Stadium; Tuscaloosa, AL (rivalry)	ESPN	W 29–28	70,123	
October 8	2:30 p.m.	Southern Miss*^{†}	No. 11	Bryant–Denny Stadium; Tuscaloosa, AL	PPV	W 14–6	70,123	
October 15	5:30 p.m.	at Tennessee	No. 10	Neyland Stadium; Knoxville, TN (Third Saturday in October)	ESPN	W 17–13	96,856	
October 22	2:30 p.m.	Ole Miss	No. 8	Bryant–Denny Stadium; Tuscaloosa, AL (rivalry)	ABC	W 21–10	70,123	
November 5	6:30 p.m.	at LSU	No. 6	Tiger Stadium; Baton Rouge, LA (rivalry)	ESPN	W 35–17	75,453	
November 12	2:30 p.m.	at No. 20 Mississippi State	No. 6	Scott Field; Starkville, MS (rivalry)	ABC	W 29–25	41,358	
November 19	2:30 p.m.	No. 6 Auburn	No. 4	Legion Field; Birmingham, AL (Iron Bowl, College GameDay)	ABC	W 21–14	83,091	
December 3	2:30 p.m.	vs. No. 6 Florida	No. 3	Georgia Dome; Atlanta, GA (SEC Championship Game, rivalry)	ABC	L 23–24	74,751	
January 2, 1995	1:00 p.m.	vs. No. 13 Ohio State*	No. 6	Florida Citrus Bowl; Orlando, FL (Florida Citrus Bowl)	ABC	W 24–17	71,195	
*Non-conference game; ^{†}Homecoming; Rankings from AP Poll released prior to the game; All times are in Central time

== Rankings ==
Ranking movements Legend: ██ Increase in ranking ██ Decrease in ranking ( ) = First-place votes
	Week																
Poll	Pre	1	2	3	4	5	6	7	8	9	10	11	12	13	14	15	Final
AP	12 (1)	11 (1)	11 (1)	12 (1)	11	11	11	10	8	8	6	6	4	3 (1)	3 (1)	6	5
Coaches	10		10	11	10	9	9	6	5	5	4	4	3	3	3	6	4

== Roster ==
1994 Alabama Crimson Tide football team roster
Players			Coaches
Offense: Pos. / # / Name / Class; QB / 7 / Jay Barker / Sr	Defense: Pos. / # / Name / Class; DB / / Mickey Conn / Sr	Special teams: Pos. / # / Name / Class	Head coach: Gene Stallings; Coordinators/assistant coaches: Dabo Swinney Graduate assistant; Legend: (C) Team captain; (S) Suspended; (I) Ineligible; Injured; Redshirt

=== Starters ===
Players who started at their respective position in the 1994 season.

Defensive starters

FS
Willie Gaston
Eric Turner

CB
Tommy Johnson
Brad Ford

WLB	MLB	SLB
Ralph Staten	John Walters	Pickett
Dwayne Rudd	Michael Rogers	Andre Royal

DE	DT	DT	DE
Dameian Jeffries	Shannon Brown	Parker	K. Moore
Bodden	Burton	Powell	Blackburn

SS
Sam Shade
Cedric Samuel

CB
Cedric Samuel
Deshea Townsend

Offensive starters

WR
Curtis Brown
Chad Key

LT	LG	C	RG	RT
Harville	Belser	Jon Stevenson	Will Friend	McNeal
		Causey	Stevenson	

TE
Patrick Hape
Tony Johnson

WR
Toderick Malone
West

QB
Jay Barker

FB
Lynch

RB
Sherman Williams
Dennis Riddle
