= 1994 Florida Citrus Bowl =

American college football game

1994 CompUSA Florida Citrus Bowl
Penn State Nittany Lions	Tennessee Volunteers
(9–2)	(9–1–1)
Big Ten	SEC
31	13
Head coach: Joe Paterno	Head coach: Phillip Fulmer
AP / Coaches / BC; 13 / 12 / 13	AP / Coaches / BC; 6 / 5 / 6
	1	2	3	4	Total
Penn State	7	10	7	7	31
Tennessee	10	3	0	0	13
- Date: January 1, 1994
- Season: 1993
- Stadium: Florida Citrus Bowl
- Location: Orlando, Florida
- MVP: Bobby Engram (Penn State)
- Referee: Mike Pereira (WAC)
- Attendance: 72,456

United States TV coverage
- Network: ABC
- Announcers: Mark Jones and Tim Brant

The 1994 Florida Citrus Bowl was a college football bowl game featuring the Penn State Nittany Lions of the Big Ten, against the Tennessee Volunteers of the SEC.

Penn State defeated Tennessee by a score of 31–13.

== Scoring summary ==
First quarter

- Tennessee – Becksvoort 46-yard Field goal 11:54 1st- Tenn 3, Penn St 0
- Tennessee – Fleming 19-yard pass from Heath Shuler (Becksvoort kick) 9:13 1st – Tenn 10, Penn St 0
- Penn State – Ki-Jana Carter 3-yard run (Fayak kick) 4:36 1st – Tenn 10, Penn St 7

Second quarter

- Penn State – Fayak 19-yard Field goal 10:22 2nd – Tenn 10, Penn St 10
- Tennessee – Becksvoort 50-yard Field goal 1:08 2nd – Tenn 13, Penn St 10
- Penn State – Carter 14-yard run (Fayak kick) 0:03 2nd – Penn St 17, Tenn 13

Third quarter

- Penn State – Kyle Brady 7-yard pass from Kerry Collins (Fayak kick) 9:55 3rd – Penn St 24, Tenn 13

Fourth quarter

- Penn State – Bobby Engram 15-yard pass from Collins (Fayak kick) 14:28 4th – Penn St 31, Tenn 13
