= 1994–95 NCAA football bowl games =

College football postseason game series

- Season: 1994
- Number of bowls: 19
- Bowl games: December 15, 1994 – January 2, 1995
- National Championship: Orange Bowl
- Location of Championship: Miami Orange Bowl; Miami, Florida
- Champions: Nebraska
Bowl record by conference
Conference	Bowls	Record	Final AP poll
Big Ten	5	4–1 (0.800)	3
SEC	5	3–2 (0.600)	5
ACC	5	3–2 (0.600)	3
Pac-10	4	2–2 (0.500)	4
Big Eight	4	2–2 (0.500)	3
Big East	4	1–3 (0.250)	2
SWC	4	1–3 (0.250)	2
WAC	3	2–1 (0.667)	3
Big West	1	1–0 (1.000)	0
MAC	1	0–1 (0.000)	0

The 1994–95 NCAA football bowl games concluded the 1994 NCAA Division I-A football season. In the third and final year of the Bowl Coalition era, the Coalition failed to achieve its goal of a true national championship game between the nation's top two teams. The Coalition's designated championship game for the 1994 season, the 1995 Orange Bowl, pitted No. 1 Nebraska against No. 3 Miami (FL), while No. 2 Penn State was tied to the Rose Bowl as a member of the Big Ten Conference. Nebraska defeated Miami in the Orange Bowl, and was named national champions by both the AP Poll and Coaches Poll, while Penn State defeated Oregon in the Rose Bowl and did not claim a national championship.

A total of 19 bowl games were played between December 14, 1994 and January 2, 1995 by 38 bowl-eligible teams. The number of bowls remained unchanged from the previous year.

== Non-Coalition bowls ==
Date	Time	Game	Site	Result	Ref.
Dec 15	9:00 PM	Las Vegas Bowl	Sam Boyd Stadium; Whitney, NV	UNLV 52, Central Michigan 24	
Dec 25	3:30 PM	Aloha Bowl	Aloha Stadium; Honolulu, HI	Boston College 12, No. 11 Kansas State 7	
Dec 27	9:00 PM	Freedom Bowl	Anaheim Stadium; Anaheim, CA	No. 14 Utah 16, No. 15 Arizona 13	
Dec 28	8:00 PM	Independence Bowl	Independence Stadium; Shreveport, LA	No. 18 Virginia 20, TCU 10	
Dec 29	8:00 PM	Copper Bowl	Arizona Stadium; Tucson, AZ	No. 22 BYU 31, Oklahoma 6	
Dec 30	9:00 PM	Holiday Bowl	Jack Murphy Stadium; San Diego, CA	No. 20 Michigan 24, No. 10 Colorado State 14	
Dec 31	1:00 PM	Liberty Bowl	Liberty Bowl Memorial Stadium; Memphis, TN	Illinois 30, East Carolina 0	
Dec 31	8:00 PM	Alamo Bowl	Alamodome; San Antonio, TX	No. 24 Washington State 10, Baylor 3	
Jan 1	8:00 PM	Peach Bowl	Georgia Dome; Atlanta, GA	No. 23 NC State 28, No. 16 Mississippi State 24	
Jan 2	11:00 AM	Hall of Fame Bowl	Tampa Stadium; Tampa, FL	Wisconsin 34, No. 25 Duke 20	
Jan 2	1:00 PM	Florida Citrus Bowl	Florida Citrus Bowl; Orlando, FL	No. 6 Alabama 24, No. 13 Ohio State 17	
Jan 2	1:30 PM	Carquest Bowl	Joe Robbie Stadium; Miami Gardens, FL	South Carolina 24, West Virginia 21	
Jan 2	4:50 PM	Rose Bowl	Rose Bowl; Pasadena, CA	No. 2 Penn State 38, No. 12 Oregon 20	
Rankings from AP Poll released prior to the game. All times are in Eastern Time.

== Bowl Coalition bowls ==
Tier I
Date	Time	Game	Site	Result	Ref.
Jan 1	8:00 PM	Orange Bowl; Championship game	Miami Orange Bowl; Miami, FL	No. 1 Nebraska 24, No. 3 Miami (FL) 17	
Jan 2	1:00 PM	Cotton Bowl Classic	Cotton Bowl; Dallas, TX	No. 21 USC 55, Texas Tech 14	
Jan 2	4:30 PM	Fiesta Bowl	Sun Devil Stadium; Tempe, AZ	No. 4 Colorado 41, Notre Dame 24	
Jan 2	8:30 PM	Sugar Bowl	Louisiana Superdome; New Orleans, LA	No. 7 Florida State 23, No. 5 Florida 17	
Rankings from AP Poll released prior to the game. All times are in Eastern Time.

Tier II
Date	Time	Game	Site	Result	Ref.
Dec 30	2:30 PM	Sun Bowl	Sun Bowl; El Paso, TX	Texas 35, No. 18 North Carolina 31	
Dec 30	7:00 PM	Gator Bowl	Ben Hill Griffin Stadium; Gainesville, FL	Tennessee 45, No. 17 Virginia Tech 23	
Rankings from AP Poll released prior to the game. All times are in Eastern Time.
