= List of NCAA Division I-A/FBS football seasons =

A list of NCAA college football seasons at the highest level, now known as the Division I Football Bowl Subdivision (FBS), since Division I split for football only in 1978. The split created the new Divisions I-A and I-AA; in 2006, they were respectively renamed FBS and FCS (with FCS standing for Football Championship Subdivision).

Division I-A

1970s
1978
1979

1980s
1980
1981
1982
1983
1984
1985
1986
1987
1988
1989

1990s
1990
1991
1992
1993
1994
1995
1996
1997
1998
1999

2000s
2000
2001
2002
2003
2004
2005

Division I FBS

2000s
2006
2007
2008
2009

2010s
2010
2011
2012
2013
2014
2015
2016
2017
2018
2019

2020s
2020
2021
2022
2023
2024
2025
2026
2027
2028
2029

The following table summarizes the articles linked above.

Year	Conference champions	National champions	Heisman Trophy
1978	ACC: Clemson; Big 8: Nebraska and Oklahoma; Big Ten: Michigan and Michigan State; Ivy: Dartmouth; MAC: Ball State; Missouri Valley: New Mexico State; Pac-10: USC; PCAA: San Jose State and Utah State; SEC: Alabama; Southern: Tennessee-Chattanooga and Furman; Southland: Louisiana Tech; Southwest: Houston; WAC: BYU	AP: Alabama; Coaches: USC	Billy Sims (RB, Oklahoma)
1979	ACC: NC State; Big 8: Oklahoma; Big Ten: Ohio State; Ivy: Yale; MAC: Central Michigan; Missouri Valley: West Texas State; Pac-10: USC; PCAA: Utah State; SEC: Alabama; Southern: Tennessee-Chattanooga; Southland: McNeese State; Southwest: Houston and Arkansas; WAC: BYU	Alabama	Charles White (RB, USC)
1980	ACC: North Carolina; Big 8: Oklahoma; Big Ten: Michigan; Ivy: Yale; MAC: Central Michigan; Missouri Valley: Tulsa; Pac-10: Washington; PCAA: Long Beach State; SEC: Georgia; Southern: Furman; Southland: McNeese State; Southwest: Baylor; WAC: BYU	Georgia	George Rogers (RB, South Carolina)
1981	ACC: Clemson; Big 8: Nebraska; Big Ten: Iowa and Ohio State; Ivy: Dartmouth and Yale; MAC: Toledo; Missouri Valley: Drake and Tulsa; Pac-10: Washington; PCAA: San Jose State; SEC: Alabama and Georgia; Southern: Furman; Southland: UT Arlington; Southwest: SMU; WAC: BYU	Clemson	Marcus Allen (RB, USC)
1982	ACC: Clemson; Big 8: Nebraska; Big Ten: Michigan; MAC: Bowling Green; Missouri Valley (I-A and I-AA): Tulsa; Pac-10: UCLA; PCAA: Fresno State; SEC: Georgia; Southwest: SMU; WAC: BYU	Penn State	Herschel Walker (RB, Georgia)
1983	ACC: Maryland; Big 8: Nebraska; Big Ten: Illinois; MAC: Northern Illinois; Missouri Valley (I-A and I-AA): Tulsa; Pac-10: UCLA; PCAA: Cal State Fullerton; SEC: Auburn; Southwest: Texas; WAC: BYU	Miami (FL)	Mike Rozier (RB, Nebraska)
1984	ACC: Maryland; Big 8: Oklahoma and Nebraska; Big Ten: Ohio State; MAC: Toledo; Missouri Valley (I-A and I-AA): Tulsa; Pac-10: USC; PCAA: Cal State Fullerton; SEC: Florida (vacated); Southwest: Houston and SMU; WAC: BYU	BYU	Doug Flutie (QB, Boston College)
1985	ACC: Maryland; Big 8: Oklahoma; Big Ten: Iowa; MAC: Bowling Green; Missouri Valley (I-A and I-AA): Tulsa; Pac-10: UCLA; PCAA: Fresno State; SEC: Tennessee; Southwest: Texas A&M; WAC: Air Force and BYU	Oklahoma	Bo Jackson (RB, Auburn)
1986	ACC: Clemson; Big 8: Oklahoma; Big Ten: Michigan and Ohio State; MAC: Miami (OH); Pac-10: Arizona State; PCAA: San Jose State; SEC: LSU; Southwest: Texas A&M; WAC: San Diego State	Penn State	Vinny Testaverde (QB, Miami (FL))
1987	ACC: Clemson; Big 8: Oklahoma; Big Ten: Michigan State; MAC: Eastern Michigan; Pac-10: USC and UCLA; PCAA: San Jose State; SEC: Auburn; Southwest: Texas A&M; WAC: Wyoming	Miami (FL)	Tim Brown (WR, Notre Dame)
1988	ACC: Clemson; Big 8: Nebraska; Big Ten: Michigan; Big West: Fresno State; MAC: Western Michigan; Pac-10: USC; SEC: Auburn and LSU; Southwest: Arkansas; WAC: Wyoming	Notre Dame	Barry Sanders (RB, Oklahoma State)
1989	ACC: Duke and Virginia; Big 8: Colorado; Big Ten: Michigan; Big West: Fresno State; MAC: Ball State; Pac-10: USC; SEC: Alabama, Auburn and Tennessee; Southwest: Arkansas; WAC: BYU	Miami (FL)	Andre Ware (QB, Houston)
1990	ACC: Georgia Tech; Big 8: Colorado; Big Ten: Illinois, Iowa, Michigan, and Michigan State; Big West: San Jose State; MAC: Central Michigan and Toledo; Pac-10: Washington; SEC: Tennessee; Southwest: Texas; WAC: BYU	AP: Colorado; Coaches: Georgia Tech	Ty Detmer (QB, BYU)
1991	ACC: Clemson; Big East: Miami (FL); Big 8: Colorado and Nebraska; Big Ten: Michigan; Big West: Fresno State and San Jose State; MAC: Bowling Green; Pac-10: Washington; SEC: Florida; Southwest: Texas A&M; WAC: San Diego State	AP: Miami (FL); Coaches: Washington	Desmond Howard (WR, Michigan)
1992	ACC: Florida State; Big East: Miami(FL); Big 8: Nebraska; Big Ten: Michigan; Big West: Nevada; MAC: Bowling Green; Pac-10: Stanford and Washington; SEC: Alabama; Southwest: Texas A&M; WAC: BYU, Fresno State, and Hawaii	Alabama	Gino Torretta (QB, Miami (FL))
1993	ACC: Florida State; Big East: West Virginia; Big 8: Nebraska; Big Ten: Ohio State and Wisconsin; Big West: Southwestern Louisiana and Utah State; MAC: Ball State; Pac-10: Arizona, USC, and UCLA; SEC: Florida; Southwest: Texas A&M; WAC: BYU, Fresno State, and Wyoming	Florida State	Charlie Ward (QB, Florida State)
1994	ACC: Florida State; Big East: Miami (FL); Big 8: Nebraska; Big Ten: Penn State; Big West: Southwestern Louisiana, Nevada, and UNLV; MAC: Central Michigan; Pac-10: Oregon; SEC: Florida; Southwest: Baylor, Rice, Texas, TCU, and Texas Tech; WAC: Colorado State	Nebraska	Rashaan Salaam (RB, Colorado)
1995	ACC: Florida State and Virginia; Big East: Miami (FL) and Virginia Tech; Big 8: Nebraska; Big Ten: Northwestern; Big West: Nevada; MAC: Toledo; Pac-10: USC and Washington; SEC: Florida; Southwest: Texas; WAC: Air Force, BYU, Colorado State, and Utah	Nebraska	Eddie George (RB, Ohio State)
1996	ACC: Florida State; Big East: Miami (FL), Syracuse, and Virginia Tech; Big Ten: Northwestern and Ohio State; Big 12: Texas; Big West: Nevada and Utah State; C-USA: Houston and Southern Miss; MAC: Ball State; Pac-10: Arizona State; SEC: Florida; WAC: BYU	Florida	Danny Wuerffel (QB, Florida)
1997	ACC: Florida State; Big East: Syracuse; Big Ten: Michigan; Big 12: Nebraska; Big West: Nevada and Utah State; C-USA: Southern Miss; MAC: Marshall; Pac-10: UCLA and Washington State; SEC: Tennessee; WAC: Colorado State	AP: Michigan; Coaches: Nebraska	Charles Woodson (CB, Michigan)
1998	ACC: Florida State and Georgia Tech; Big East: Syracuse; Big Ten: Michigan, Ohio State, and Wisconsin; Big 12: Texas A&M; Big West: Idaho; C-USA: Tulane; MAC: Marshall; Pac-10: UCLA; SEC: Tennessee; WAC: Air Force	Tennessee	Ricky Williams (RB, Texas)
1999	ACC: Florida State; Big East: Virginia Tech; Big Ten: Wisconsin; Big 12: Nebraska; Big West: Boise State; C-USA: Southern Miss; MAC: Marshall; MWC: BYU, Colorado State, and Utah; Pac-10: Stanford; SEC: Alabama; WAC: Hawaii, Fresno State, and TCU	Florida State	Ron Dayne (RB, Wisconsin)
2000	ACC: Florida State; Big East Miami (FL); Big Ten: Michigan, Northwestern, and Purdue; Big 12: Oklahoma; Big West: Boise State; C-USA: Louisville; MAC: Marshall; MWC: Colorado State; Pac-10: Oregon, Oregon State, and Washington; SEC: Florida; WAC: TCU and UTEP	Oklahoma	Chris Weinke (QB, Florida State)
2001	ACC: Maryland; Big East: Miami (FL); Big Ten: Illinois; Big 12: Colorado; C-USA: Louisville; MAC: Toledo; MWC: BYU; Pac-10: Oregon; SEC: LSU; Sun Belt: Middle Tennessee and North Texas; WAC: Louisiana Tech	Miami (FL)	Eric Crouch (QB, Nebraska)
2002	ACC: Florida State; Big East: Miami (FL); Big Ten: Iowa and Ohio State; Big 12: Oklahoma; C-USA: Cincinnati and TCU; MAC: Marshall; MWC: Colorado State; Pac-10: USC and Washington State; SEC: Georgia; Sun Belt: North Texas; WAC: Boise State	Ohio State	Carson Palmer (QB, USC)
2003	ACC: Florida State; Big East: Miami (FL) and West Virginia; Big Ten: Michigan; Big 12: Kansas State; C-USA: Southern Miss; MAC: Miami (OH); MWC: Utah; Pac-10: USC; SEC: LSU; Sun Belt: North Texas; WAC: Boise State	AP: USC; Coaches: LSU	Jason White (QB, Oklahoma)
2004	ACC: Virginia Tech; Big East: Boston College, Pittsburgh, Syracuse, and West Virginia; Big Ten: Iowa and Michigan; Big 12: Oklahoma; C-USA: Louisville; MAC: Toledo; MWC: Utah; Pac-10: USC; SEC: Auburn; Sun Belt: North Texas; WAC: Boise State	None (USC were stripped of the title)	Matt Leinart (QB, USC)
2005	ACC: Florida State; Big East: West Virginia; Big Ten: Ohio State and Penn State; Big 12: Texas; C-USA: Tulsa; MAC: Akron; MWC: TCU; Pac-10: USC; SEC: Georgia; Sun Belt: Arkansas State, Louisiana–Lafayette, and Louisiana-Monroe; WAC: Boise State and Nevada	Texas	Reggie Bush (RB, USC)
2006	ACC: Wake Forest; Big East: Louisville; Big Ten: Ohio State; Big 12: Oklahoma; C-USA: Houston; MAC: Central Michigan; MWC: BYU; Pac-10: California and USC; SEC: Florida; Sun Belt: Middle Tennessee and Troy; WAC: Boise State	Florida	Troy Smith (QB, Ohio State)
2007	ACC: Virginia Tech; Big East: West Virginia and Connecticut; Big Ten: Ohio State; Big 12: Oklahoma; C-USA: UCF; MAC: Central Michigan; MWC: BYU; Pac-10: USC and Arizona State; SEC: LSU; Sun Belt: Florida Atlantic and Troy; WAC: Hawaii	LSU	Tim Tebow (QB, Florida)
2008	ACC: Virginia Tech; Big East: Cincinnati; Big Ten: Penn State and Ohio State; Big 12: Oklahoma; C-USA: East Carolina; MAC: Buffalo; MWC: Utah; Pac-10: USC; SEC: Florida; Sun Belt: Troy; WAC: Boise State	Florida	Sam Bradford (QB, Oklahoma)
2009	ACC: Georgia Tech; Big 12: Texas; Big East: Cincinnati; Big Ten: Ohio State; C-USA: East Carolina; MAC: Central Michigan; MWC: TCU; Pac-10: Oregon; SEC: Alabama; Sun Belt: Troy; WAC: Boise State	Alabama	Mark Ingram II (RB, Alabama)
2010	ACC: Virginia Tech; Big 12: Oklahoma; Big East: Connecticut, Pittsburgh, West Virginia; Big Ten: Michigan State, Ohio State, Wisconsin; C-USA: UCF; MAC: Miami (OH); MWC: TCU; Pac-10: Oregon; SEC: Auburn; Sun Belt: FIU; WAC: Boise State, Hawaii, Nevada	Auburn	Cam Newton (QB, Auburn)
2011	ACC: Clemson; Big 12: Oklahoma State; Big East: Cincinnati, Louisville, West Virginia; Big Ten: Wisconsin; C-USA: Southern Miss; MAC: Northern Illinois; MW: TCU; Pac-12: Oregon; SEC: LSU; Sun Belt: Arkansas State; WAC: Louisiana Tech	Alabama	Robert Griffin III (QB, Baylor)
2012	ACC: Florida State; Big 12: Kansas State, Oklahoma; Big East: Cincinnati, Louisville, Rutgers, Syracuse; Big Ten: Wisconsin; C-USA: Tulsa; MAC: Northern Illinois; MW: Boise State, Fresno State, San Diego State; Pac-12: Stanford; SEC: Alabama; Sun Belt: Arkansas State; WAC: Utah State	Alabama	Johnny Manziel (QB, Texas A&M)
2013	American: UCF; ACC: Florida State; Big 12: Baylor; Big Ten: Michigan State; C-USA: Rice; MAC: Bowling Green; MW: Fresno State; Pac-12: Stanford; SEC: Auburn; Sun Belt: Arkansas State, Louisiana–Lafayette	Florida State	Jameis Winston (QB, Florida State)
2014	American: Cincinnati, Memphis, UCF; ACC: Florida State; Big 12: Baylor, TCU; Big Ten: Ohio State; C-USA: Marshall; MAC: Northern Illinois; MW: Boise State; Pac-12: Oregon; SEC: Alabama; Sun Belt: Georgia Southern	Ohio State	Marcus Mariota (QB, Oregon)
2015	American: Houston; ACC: Clemson; Big 12: Oklahoma; Big Ten: Michigan State; C-USA: Western Kentucky; MAC: Bowling Green; MW: San Diego State; Pac-12: Stanford; SEC: Alabama; Sun Belt: Arkansas State	Alabama	Derrick Henry (RB, Alabama)
2016	American: Temple; ACC: Clemson; Big 12: Oklahoma; Big Ten: Penn State; C-USA: Western Kentucky; MAC: Western Michigan; MW: San Diego State; Pac-12: Washington; SEC: Alabama; Sun Belt: Appalachian State and Arkansas State	Clemson	Lamar Jackson (QB, Louisville)
2017	American: UCF; ACC: Clemson; Big 12: Oklahoma; Big Ten: Ohio State; C-USA: Florida Atlantic; MAC: Toledo; MW: Boise State; Pac-12: USC; SEC: Georgia; Sun Belt: Appalachian State and Troy	Alabama	Baker Mayfield (QB, Oklahoma)
2018	American: UCF; ACC: Clemson; Big 12: Oklahoma; Big Ten: Ohio State; C–USA: UAB; MAC: Northern Illinois; MW: Fresno State; Pac-12: Washington; SEC: Alabama; Sun Belt: Appalachian State	Clemson	Kyler Murray (QB, Oklahoma)
2019	American: Memphis; ACC: Clemson; Big 12: Oklahoma; Big Ten: Ohio State; C–USA: Florida Atlantic; MAC: Miami (OH); MW: Boise State; Pac-12: Oregon; SEC: LSU; Sun Belt: Appalachian State	LSU	Joe Burrow, (QB, LSU)
2020	AAC: Cincinnati; ACC: Clemson; Big 12: Oklahoma; Big Ten: Ohio State; C–USA: UAB; MAC: Ball State; MW: San Jose State; Pac-12: Oregon; SEC: Alabama; Sun Belt: Coastal Carolina and Louisiana	Alabama	DeVonta Smith (WR, Alabama)
2021	AAC: Cincinnati; ACC: Pittsburgh; Big 12: Baylor; Big Ten: Michigan; C–USA: UTSA; MAC: Northern Illinois; MW: Utah State; Pac–12: Utah; SEC: Alabama; Sun Belt: Louisiana	Georgia	Bryce Young (QB, Alabama)
2022	AAC: Tulane; ACC: Clemson; Big 12: Kansas State; Big Ten: Michigan; C−USA: UTSA; MAC: Toledo; MW: Fresno State; Pac-12: Utah; SEC: Georgia; Sun Belt: Troy	Georgia	Caleb Williams (QB, USC)
2023	AAC: SMU; ACC: Florida State; Big 12: Texas; Big Ten: Michigan; C−USA: Liberty; MAC: Miami; MW: Boise State; Pac-12: Washington; SEC: Alabama; Sun Belt: Troy	Michigan	Jayden Daniels (QB, LSU)
2024	AAC: Army; ACC: Clemson; Big 12: Arizona State; Big Ten: Oregon; C−USA: Jacksonville State; MAC: Ohio; MW: Boise State; Pac-12: Oregon State; SEC: Georgia; Sun Belt: Marshall	Ohio State	Travis Hunter (CB/WR, Colorado)
2025	American: Tulane; ACC: Duke; Big 12: Texas Tech; Big Ten: Indiana; C−USA: Kennesaw State; MAC: Western Michigan; MW: Boise State; Pac-12: Washington State; SEC: Georgia; Sun Belt: James Madison	Indiana	Fernando Mendoza (QB, Indiana)

== See also ==
- List of NCAA Division I-AA/FCS football seasons
