= 1995 Peach Bowl =

1995 Peach Bowl may refer to:

- 1995 Peach Bowl (January), January 2, 1995, game between the NC State Wolfpack and the Mississippi State Bulldogs
- 1995 Peach Bowl (December), December 30, 1995, game between the Georgia Bulldogs and the Virginia Cavaliers
