= Chuck Reedy =

American football player and coach (born 1949)

Biographical details
- Born: May 31, 1949 (age 77)

Playing career
- 1969: Appalachian State

Coaching career (HC unless noted)
- 1971–1973: Appling County HS (GA) (assistant)
- 1974–1977: Baker County HS (FL)
- 1978–1985: Clemson (RB)
- 1986–1989: Clemson (OC)
- 1990–1992: Baylor (OC)
- 1993–1996: Baylor
- 1998: South Carolina (OC)
- 2002–2014: Goose Creek HS (SC)

Head coaching record
- Overall: 23–22 (college)
- Bowls: 0–1

Accomplishments and honors

Championships
- 1 SWC (1994)

Charles Reedy (born May 31, 1949) is an American former football player and coach. He served as the head coach at Baylor University from 1993 to 1996, compiling a record of 23–22. Prior to replacing future College Football Hall of Fame inductee Grant Teaff, as head coach, Reedy worked for three seasons as Baylor's offensive coordinator. From 1978 to 1989, he was an assistant coach at Clemson University and was a member of Clemson's national championship team in 1981.

== Coaching career ==
=== Baylor ===
In Reedy's first game as head coach at Baylor, the Bears rallied from a 33–14 deficit to upset the Trent Dilfer-led Fresno State Bulldogs, 42–39. However, Baylor played inconsistently in 1993, posting impressive wins over Texas Tech and Rice, while losing by more than 20 points to a 4–7 TCU squad and the otherwise win-less Houston Cougars. Baylor finished the 1993 season at 5–6.

In Reedy's second season, in 1994, the team rebounded to finish 7–4 in the regular season and tie with four other schools for the Southwest Conference championship before losing to Washington State in the Alamo Bowl. High points of the season included a 44–3 thrashing of Louisiana Tech, avenging a one-point loss in from two seasons prior, and road wins over two of the eventual Southwest Conference co-champions, 42–18 over TCU and 17–14 over Rice. Low points included a 38–7 loss to Texas Tech and a nationally televised 63–35 loss at home to Texas on Thanksgiving Day.

Reedy's third season also produced a 7–4 regular season record, but the team failed to receive a bowl invite. The Baylor defense in 1995 was ranked in the top ten nationally and included future NFL player, Daryl Gardener, but the team often struggled on offense. Baylor performed well in Southwest Conference (SWC) play, carrying a 5–1 conference record and a SWC title shot into their season finale at Texas on Thanksgiving Day. However, the Bears lost 21–13. Offensive coordinator Jack Crowe left the team after the 1995 season and Reedy hired future Oklahoma State head coach, Mike Gundy as an offensive assistant.

In 1996, Reedy's fourth season, Baylor moved into the newly formed Big 12 Conference. The season began well with three straight non-conference victories. However, the Bears struggled in the new conference, finishing with only a 1–7 record against Big 12 competition. Losses included a 24–21 home defeat to a 3–8 Oklahoma team after Baylor led 21–7 at the half, an overtime home loss to Missouri and, a 24–7 loss to Texas A&M, the worst Aggies team, record-wise, of the 1990s. Baylor had led Texas A&M, 7–0, at the half. Reedy was fired after the 1996 season and replaced by Dave Roberts.

=== South Carolina and Goose Creek High School ===
Reedy returned to the coaching ranks as an offensive coordinator at the University of South Carolina in 1998. Reedy's successor at Baylor, Dave Roberts, was fired by Baylor after the 1998 season and, likewise, surfaced next as an assistant at South Carolina. In 2002, Reedy was named the head football coach at Goose Creek High School in Goose Creek, South Carolina; a suburb of Charleston. After the 2014 season, Reedy retired from coaching after 13 seasons at Goose Creek. He compiled a record of 119–47 with one state title in 2011.

== Head coaching record ==
=== College ===
Year	Team	Overall	Conference	Standing	Bowl/playoffs
Baylor Bears (Southwest Conference) (1993–1995)
1993	Baylor	5–6	3–4	T–4th	
1994	Baylor	7–5	4–3	T–1st	L Alamo
1995	Baylor	7–4	5–2	T–2nd	
Baylor Bears (Big 12 Conference) (1996)
1996	Baylor	4–7	1–7	6th (South)	
Baylor:		23–22	13–16		
Total:		23–22			
