= Pat Sullivan (American football) =

American football player (1950–2019)

No. 7
- Position: Quarterback

Personal information
- Born: January 18, 1950; Birmingham, Alabama, U.S.
- Died: December 1, 2019 (aged 69); Birmingham, Alabama, U.S.
- Listed height: 6 ft 0 in (1.83 m)
- Listed weight: 198 lb (90 kg)

Career information
- High school: John Carroll (Birmingham)
- College: Auburn (1969–1971)
- NFL draft: 1972: 2nd round, 40th overall pick

Career history

Playing
- Atlanta Falcons (1972–1975); Washington Redskins (1976)*; San Francisco 49ers (1977)*
- * Offseason or practice squad member only

Coaching
- Auburn (1986–1991) Quarterbacks coach; TCU (1992–1997) Head coach; UAB (1999–2006) Offensive coordinator & quarterbacks coach; Samford (2007–2014) Head coach

Awards and highlights
- As a player: Heisman Trophy (1971); Walter Camp Award (1971); Sammy Baugh Trophy (1970); SN Player of the Year (1971); Chic Harley Award (1971); Unanimous All-American (1971); SEC Player of the Year (1970); 2× First-team All-SEC (1970, 1971); Second-team All-SEC (1969); Auburn Tigers No. 7 retired; As a coach: SWC champion (1994); SoCon champion (2013); SWC Coach of the Year (1994); SoCon Co-Coach of the Year (2012)

Career NFL statistics
- Passing attempts: 220
- Passing completions: 93
- Completion percentage: 42.3%
- TD–INT: 5–16
- Passing yards: 1,155
- Passer rating: 36.5
- Stats at Pro Football Reference

Head coaching record
- Regular season: 71–85–1 (.455)
- Postseason: 0–2 (.000)
- Career: 71–87–1 (.450)
- College Football Hall of Fame

Patrick Joseph Sullivan (January 18, 1950 – December 1, 2019) was an American professional football player and college coach. An All-America quarterback for the Auburn Tigers, he won the Heisman Trophy in 1971 and then played six seasons in the National Football League (NFL) with the Atlanta Falcons and Washington Redskins. Sullivan was a head football coach at Samford University, a position he held from 2007 to 2014. He was previously the head football coach at Texas Christian University (TCU) from 1992 to 1997 and the offensive coordinator at the University of Alabama at Birmingham (UAB) from 1999 to 2006. He was inducted into the College Football Hall of Fame as a player in 1991.

== College career ==
Born in Birmingham, Alabama, Sullivan began his athletic career as a three-sport star at Birmingham's John Carroll Catholic High School. Although a talented baseball and basketball player, he chose to play football for Auburn University where he would become the starting quarterback in 1969 under the tutelage of head coach Ralph Jordan. Over the next three seasons, the 6 ft 0 in (1.83 m) tall and 190 lb (86 kg; 14 st) Sullivan would break school and NCAA records for passing while leading the team to a 26–7 record.

In 1970, he led the NCAA in total offense with 2,856 yards and set an NCAA record for most yards per play with 8.57. In his career, he was responsible for 72 touchdowns (54 passing/18 rushing) to tie the NCAA record. In his senior season, Sullivan completed 162 passes on 281 attempts for 2,012 yards and 20 touchdowns. This performance was enough to edge out Ed Marinaro for the 1971 Heisman Trophy. Also an excellent student, Sullivan was named an Academic All-American and graduated with a Bachelor of Science in business administration in 1972. Sullivan finished his college career with 6,284 passing yards and 54 touchdowns, along with another 18 touchdowns on the ground. He was selected to play in the Senior Bowl, where he led the South to victory over the North and was given the game's Most Valuable Player award.

== Professional career ==
After college, Sullivan had a six-season professional NFL football career. He was a second-round selection (40th overall pick) of the 1972 NFL draft by the Atlanta Falcons. Sullivan played with the Falcons from 1972 to 1975. He played in 30 games. In 1974, Sullivan started three games for the Atlanta Falcons, losing all three. He completed 48 of 105 passes and one touchdown. In 1975, he threw for 3 touchdowns, completing 28 of 70 passes. He signed with the Washington Redskins as a free agent in 1976 but was cut before the start of the season. He signed with the Chicago Bears in March 1977 but was sold to the San Francisco 49ers in June, and then cut by the 49ers before the start of the 1977 season. Sullivan left football to enter private business in Birmingham, where he worked in insurance and as a tire company executive.

== Coaching career ==
Sullivan spent five seasons doing radio color commentary for Auburn football games before joining the staff at Auburn in 1986 as quarterbacks coach under head coach Pat Dye. He worked with Auburn quarterbacks Jeff Burger, Reggie Slack, and Stan White during his six years at Auburn. During his time as an assistant Auburn won, or shared, three Southeastern Conference championships and had a four-game winning streak against archrival Alabama.

On January 2, 1992, Sullivan became the 27th head football coach of Texas Christian University. He inherited a team still reeling from probation imposed by the NCAA in 1986. Most seriously, the Frogs had been limited to 25 scholarships in 1987 and 1988. By the time Sullivan arrived in Fort Worth, the sanctions had taken their full effect; TCU would not have a full complement of scholarships until 1993.

After two losing seasons, he led TCU to a 7–5 mark in 1994 to win a share of the Southwest Conference championship, the school's first SWC title since 1959. Following the 1994 season, prior to the Horned Frogs' appearance in the Independence Bowl versus Virginia, Sullivan agreed to become the head coach at Louisiana State University (LSU). However, LSU refused to pay the $400,000 buyout of Sullivan's TCU contract, and the Tigers hired Vanderbilt University coach Gerry DiNardo three days later.

The next season produced another winning record of 6–5 before TCU joined the Western Athletic Conference in 1996 and fell once again on hard times. Losing seasons in 1996 and 1997 resulted in Sullivan's resignation in October 1997 with an overall record of 24–42–1. However, he is best known for having recruited LaDainian Tomlinson to play at TCU.

In January 1999, Sullivan became the offensive coordinator and quarterbacks coach of UAB. He helped develop Darrell Hackney into the best quarterback in UAB history who was able to make it to the NFL as an undrafted free agent picked up by the Cleveland Browns. UAB's offense also featured wide receiver Roddy White, who later played for the Atlanta Falcons.

After neck surgery in September 2003, Sullivan was diagnosed with throat cancer by Dr. William R. Carroll (squamous cell carcinoma) and began chemotherapy and radiation treatments in December. In April 2004, doctors told him he was clear of cancer, but he continued to be monitored for recurrence. Sullivan missed only one game coaching in the 2003 season due to treatment, but lost around 50 pounds over the course of his cancer treatment.

On December 1, 2006, Sullivan was named head coach at Samford University, replacing Bill Gray. In 2008, the Bulldogs joined the Southern Conference and won the championship in 2013. He resigned after the 2014 season, his eighth season as coach.

== Personal life ==
Sullivan was married to the former Jean Hicks of Birmingham and they had three children – Kim, and twins Kelly and Patrick Jr.

== Death ==
Pat Sullivan died on December 1, 2019, after a long battle with cancer. On January 1, 2020, Auburn players wore "7" decals on the left side of their helmets during the Outback Bowl to commemorate Sullivan.

He was cremated at Ridout's Valley Chapel Funeral Home in Homewood, Alabama. His celebration of life was held at Church of the Highlands within the Grants Mills campus on December 6, 2019.

== Honors and awards ==
Sullivan was selected to the Alabama Sports Hall of Fame, class of 1981. In 1988, he was also a charter member of the Senior Bowl Hall of Fame. The football field house at Samford University was renamed in his honor. In 2016, Sullivan's High School Alma Mater renamed the John Carroll High School Football Field in honor of Pat Sullivan.

- Omicron Delta Kappa, 1971
- Heisman Trophy, 1971
- Chic Harley Award
- Sammy Baugh Trophy, 1970
- Walter Camp Award, 1971
- SN Player of the Year, 1971
- All-American, 1970, 1971 (unanimous)
- SEC Player of the Year, 1970
- SEC Back of the Year-Birmingham Touchdown Club, 1970
- SEC Back of the Year-Atlanta Touchdown Club, 1970
- Gator Bowl Most Valuable Player, 1970
- Sugar Bowl Most Valuable Player, 1971
- Senior Bowl Most Valuable Player, 1972
- College All-Star Game Most Valuable Player, 1972
- Alabama Sports Hall of Fame
- National Football Foundation Hall of Fame
- Sugar Bowl Hall of Fame
- Gator Bowl Hall of Fame
- Senior Bowl Hall of Fame
- College Football Hall of Fame, 1991
- Southwest Conference Coach of the Year, 1994
- Southern Conference Co-Coach of the Year, 2012

== Head coaching record ==
| Year | Team | Overall | Conference | Standing | Bowl/playoffs | Coaches^{#} | AP^{°} |
|---|---|---|---|---|---|---|---|
TCU Horned Frogs (Southwest Conference) (1992–1995)
| 1992 | TCU | 2–8–1 | 1–6 | 8th | | | |
| 1993 | TCU | 4–7 | 2–5 | 6th | | | |
| 1994 | TCU | 7–5 | 4–3 | T–1st | L Independence | | |
| 1995 | TCU | 6–5 | 3–4 | 5th | | | |
TCU Horned Frogs (Western Athletic Conference) (1996–1997)
| 1996 | TCU | 4–7 | 3–5 | T–5th (Mountain) | | | |
| 1997 | TCU | 1–10 | 1–7 | 8th (Mountain) | | | |
| TCU: | | 24–42–1 | 14–30 | | | | |
Samford Bulldogs (Ohio Valley Conference) (2007)
| 2007 | Samford | 4–7 | 2–6 | T–7th | | | |
Samford Bulldogs (Southern Conference) (2008–2014)
| 2008 | Samford | 6–5 | 4–4 | T–4th | | | |
| 2009 | Samford | 5–6 | 3–5 | 6th | | | |
| 2010 | Samford | 4–7 | 2–6 | 7th | | | |
| 2011 | Samford | 6–5 | 4–4 | 5th | | | |
| 2012 | Samford | 7–4 | 5–3 | T–4th | | | |
| 2013 | Samford | 8–5 | 6–2 | T–1st | L NCAA Division I First Round | | |
| 2014 | Samford | 7–4 | 5–2 | T–2nd | | | |
| Samford: | | 47–43 | 31–32 | | | | |
| Total: | | 71–85–1 | | | | | |
National championship Conference title Conference division title or championship game berth
^{#}Rankings from final Coaches Poll.; ^{°}Rankings from final AP Poll.

== See also ==
- List of NCAA major college football yearly total offense leaders
