= 1994 Maryland Terrapins football team =

American college football season

1994 Maryland Terrapins football
- Conference: Atlantic Coast Conference
- Record: 4–7 (2–6 ACC)
- Head coach: Mark Duffner (3rd season)
- Offensive coordinator: Dan Dorazio (3rd season)
- Offensive scheme: Run and shoot
- Defensive coordinator: Kevin Coyle (1st season)
- Base defense: 4–3
- Home stadium: Byrd Stadium

1994 Atlantic Coast Conference football standings
	Conf.					Overall
Team	W		L		T	W		L		T
No. 4 Florida State $	8	–	0	–	0	10	–	1	–	1
No. 17 NC State	6	–	2	–	0	9	–	3	–	0
No. 15 Virginia	5	–	3	–	0	9	–	3	–	0
Duke	5	–	3	–	0	8	–	4	–	0
North Carolina	5	–	3	–	0	8	–	4	–	0
Clemson	4	–	4	–	0	5	–	6	–	0
Maryland	2	–	6	–	0	4	–	7	–	0
Wake Forest	1	–	7	–	0	3	–	8	–	0
Georgia Tech	0	–	8	–	0	1	–	10	–	0
$ – Conference champion; Rankings from AP Poll

The 1994 Maryland Terrapins football team represented the University of Maryland in the 1994 NCAA Division I-A football season. In their third season under head coach Mark Duffner, the Terrapins compiled a 4–7 record, finished in seventh place in the Atlantic Coast Conference, and were outscored by their opponents 326 to 270. The team's statistical leaders included Scott Milanovich with 2,394 passing yards, Allen Williams with 649 rushing yards, and Geroy Simon with 891 receiving yards.

== Schedule ==
Date	Time	Opponent	Site	TV	Result	Attendance	Source
September 3		at Duke	Wallace Wade Stadium; Durham, NC		L 16–49	20,831	
September 10	12:00 p.m.	No. 4 Florida State	Byrd Stadium; College Park, MD	JPS	L 20–52	38,014	
September 17	1:00 p.m.	at West Virginia*	Mountaineer Field; Morgantown, WV (rivalry)		W 24–13	62,852	
September 24	12:00 p.m.	Wake Forest	Byrd Stadium; College Park, MD	JPS	W 31–7	24,787	
October 1	12:00 p.m.	at Clemson	Memorial Stadium; Clemson, SC	JPS	L 0–13	67,819	
October 15		at No. 15 North Carolina	Kenan Memorial Stadium; Chapel Hill, NC		L 17–41	48,500	
October 22		Georgia Tech	Byrd Stadium; College Park, MD		W 42–27	30,429	
October 29		Tulane*	Byrd Stadium; College Park, MD		W 38–10	24,456	
November 5		NC State	Byrd Stadium; College Park, MD		L 45–47	27,126	
November 12	1:00 p.m.	at No. 21 Virginia	Scott Stadium; Charlottesville, VA (rivalry)		L 21–46	40,900	
November 20	12:00 p.m.	at Syracuse*	Carrier Dome; Syracuse, NY		L 16–21	48,309	
*Non-conference game; Rankings from AP Poll released prior to the game; All times are in Eastern time

== Roster ==
1994 Maryland Terrapins football team roster
Players
Coaches
Offense

Pos.	#	Name	Class
QB	9	Brian Cummings	Fr
WR	4	Jermaine Lewis	Jr
QB	13	Scott Milanovich	Jr
TE	97	Craig Fitzgerald	So

Defense

Pos.	#	Name	Class
DE	42	Eric Ogbogu	Fr
LB	32	Kendall Ogle	Fr
DB	12	Chad Scott	So

Special teams

Pos.	#	Name	Class

Head coach

- Mark Duffner

Coordinators/assistant coaches

Legend

- (C) Team captain
- (S) Suspended
- (I) Ineligible
- Injured
- Redshirt
