= 1994 SMU Mustangs football team =

American college football season

1994 SMU Mustangs football
- Conference: Southwest Conference
- Record: 1–9–1 (0–6–1 SWC)
- Head coach: Tom Rossley (4th season)
- Offensive coordinator: Mike Wade (4th season)
- Offensive scheme: Run and shoot
- Defensive coordinator: Jon Tenuta (5th season)
- Base defense: 4–3
- Home stadium: Ownby Stadium; Cotton Bowl

1994 Southwest Conference football standings
	Conf.					Overall
Team	W		L		T	W		L		T
No. 8 Texas A&M *	6	–	0	–	1	10	–	0	–	1
No. 25 Texas +	4	–	3	–	0	8	–	4	–	0
Baylor +	4	–	3	–	0	7	–	5	–	0
TCU +	4	–	3	–	0	7	–	5	–	0
Texas Tech +	4	–	3	–	0	6	–	6	–	0
Rice +	4	–	3	–	0	5	–	6	–	0
Houston	1	–	6	–	0	1	–	10	–	0
SMU	0	–	6	–	1	1	–	9	–	1
+ – Conference co-champions; * – ineligible for championship and postseason due to NCAA sanctions; Rankings from AP Poll

The 1994 SMU Mustangs football team represented Southern Methodist University (SMU) as a member of the Southwest Conference (SWC) during the 1994 NCAA Division I-A football season. Led by fourth-year head coach Tom Rossley, the Mustangs compiled an overall record of 1–9–1 with a mark of 0–6–1 in conference play, placing last out of eight teams in the SWC.

The highlight of the campaign was a 21–21 tie vs. Texas A&M, which went 10–0–1 but was ineligible to win the SWC championship and participate in a bowl game (and was also banned from television) due to penalties enforced by the NCAA for numerous rule violations. It was the last tie for the Mustangs and Aggies, as the NCAA adopted overtime for regular season games starting in 1996.

This was the final season SMU played home games at Ownby Stadium, although the Mustangs moved their home game with Houston to the nearby Cotton Bowl. The scheduled home game with Texas A&M was shifted to the Alamodome in San Antonio for a guarantee of the gate; most of the crowd of over 51,000 wore the Aggies' Maroon and White.

The regular season finale vs. TCU was the Mustangs' last on-campus home game until the opening of Gerald J. Ford Stadium for the 2000 season.

== Schedule ==
Date	Time	Opponent	Site	TV	Result	Attendance	Source
September 3	3:00 p.m.	at Arkansas*	War Memorial Stadium; Little Rock, AR		L 14–34	51,180	
September 10	6:30 p.m.	at No. 13 UCLA*	Rose Bowl; Pasadena, CA		L 10–17	40,638	
September 17	12:00 p.m.	New Mexico*	Ownby Stadium; University Park, TX	Raycom	W 34–31	11,100	
September 24	2:00 p.m.	at Texas Tech	Jones Stadium; Lubbock, TX		L 7–35	29,521	
October 1	2:00 p.m.	No. 18 North Carolina*	Ownby Stadium; University Park, TX		L 24–28	18,200	
October 8	1:00 p.m.	at Baylor	Floyd Casey Stadium; Waco, TX		L 10–44	34,869	
October 15	12:00 p.m.	Houston	Cotton Bowl; Dallas, TX (rivalry)	Raycom	L 33–39	11,400	
October 22	12:00 p.m.	at No. 13 Texas	Texas Memorial Stadium; Austin, TX	Raycom	L 20–42	61,307	
October 29	2:00 p.m.	vs. No. 7 Texas A&M	Alamodome; San Antonio, TX		T 21–21	51,056	
November 5	12:00 p.m.	at Rice	Rice Stadium; Houston, TX (rivalry)	Raycom	L 10–17	17,800	
November 12	2:00 p.m.	TCU	Ownby Stadium; University Park, TX (rivalry)		L 14–35	20,463	
*Non-conference game; Rankings from AP Poll released prior to the game; All times are in Central time

== Roster ==
1994 SMU Mustangs football team roster
Players
Coaches
Offense

Pos.	#	Name	Class
QB	8	Ramon Flanigan	So
WR	22	Mick Rossley	Sr

Defense

Pos.	#	Name	Class
LB	42	Chris Bordano	Fr

Special teams

Pos.	#	Name	Class

Head coach

- Tom Rossley

Coordinators/assistant coaches

Legend

- (C) Team captain
- (S) Suspended
- (I) Ineligible
- Injured
- Redshirt
