= Matt Groh =

American football executive (born 1981)

New England Patriots
- Title: Vice President of Football Administration

Personal information
- Born: 1981 (age 44–45); Garden City, New York

Career information
- Position: Quarterback
- College: Princeton

Career history
- New England Patriots (2011–present); Scouting assistant (2011-2012); Area scout (2013-2018); National scout (2019-2020); Director of college scouting (2021); Director of player personnel (2022-2024); Vice present of football administration (2025-present)

Awards and highlights
- 3× Super Bowl champion (XLIX, LI, LIII)

Matthew Brodie Groh (born 1981) is an American football executive who is the vice president of football administration for the New England Patriots of the National Football League (NFL). Groh began his NFL career as a scouting assistant with the Patriots before working as a scout and executive since 2011.

== Early years ==
Groh played college football at Princeton University as a quarterback. He graduated from Princeton in 2003 and would later earn a Juris Doctor degree from the University of Virginia in 2008.

== Executive career ==
In 2011, Groh began his NFL career with the New England Patriots as a scouting assistant. In 2013, he was promoted to area scout. In 2019, Groh was promoted to national and to director of college scouting in 2021. On February 15, 2022, Groh was promoted to director of player personnel, replacing Dave Ziegler following his departure to become the general manager of the Las Vegas Raiders.

== Personal life ==
Groh and his wife, Courtney, have a daughter, Emma, and a son, Ryan.

Groh is the son of former American football coach Al Groh. His brother Mike, is the wide receivers coach for the New York Giants.
