= 1994 Independence Bowl =

1994 Poulan/Weed Eater Independence Bowl
| Virginia Cavaliers | TCU Horned Frogs |
| (8–3) | (7–4) |
| ACC | SWC |
| 20 | 10 |
| Head coach: George Welsh | Head coach: Pat Sullivan |
| AP / Coaches / BC; 18 / 16 / 19 |
| | 1 | 2 | 3 | 4 | Total |
|---|---|---|---|---|---|
| Virginia | 0 | 10 | 10 | 0 | 20 |
| TCU | 0 | 3 | 0 | 7 | 10 |
- Date: December 28, 1994
- Season: 1994
- Stadium: Independence Stadium
- Location: Shreveport, Louisiana
- MVP: QB Mike Groh; DE Mike Frederick
- Referee: John Smith (Big East)
- Attendance: 36,192

United States TV coverage
- Network: ESPN
- Announcers: Sean McDonough; Rick Walker; Dan Debenham

The 1994 Independence Bowl was a college football postseason bowl game between the TCU Horned Frogs and the Virginia Cavaliers.

== Background ==
TCU were co-champions of the Southwest Conference with four other teams, due to Texas A&M being ineligible for the conference title due to sanctions. This was TCU's first conference championship in 35 years. This was also TCU's first bowl appearance in 10 years. Virginia was third in the Atlantic Coast Conference and in a bowl game for the second time in the calendar year of 1994. After a loss to #4 Florida State in their first game, they won six straight games, jumping up to #13 before losing to Duke. They went 2–1 after that, with a loss to NC State making them fall from #13 to #18.

== Game summary ==
In a rain drenched mess laid the Frogs, who failed to win a bowl game once again, the fourth since 1959. The Frogs had a 411.6 yards per game offense, but on this day were limited to 191, as Virginia limited the junior tailback André Davis to 97 yards on 24 carries and made quarterback Max Knake (8 for 24 with 65 yards and 1 touchdown and 1 interception) ineffective. The Cavaliers utilized the rushing attack of Charles Way and Kevin Brooks, who ran for 114 and 90 yards, respectively. Mike Groh went 14 for 23 with 2 interception and 1 touchdown. When asked what he would have done differently after the game, Knake responded "I'd probably stay out of the casinos before having to get up at 8:30 the next morning. . . . The truth of it is, I played terrible."

== Aftermath ==
While TCU wouldn't make another bowl game under Sullivan, they would return to a bowl game four years later. Virginia would reach bowl games in five of Welsh's six final years, including a conference title in 1995.

== Statistics ==
| Statistics | TCU | Virginia |
|---|---|---|
| First downs | 11 | 20 |
| Yards rushing | 126 | 237 |
| Yards passing | 65 | 199 |
| Total yards | 191 | 436 |
| Punts-Average | 8-37.3 | 4-38.5 |
| Fumbles-Lost | 2-1 | 1-0 |
| Interceptions | 2 | 1 |
| Penalties-Yards | 6-39 | 9-66 |
