= 1994 Alamo Bowl =

1994 Builders Square Alamo Bowl
- Second edition
Washington State Cougars	Baylor Bears
(7–4)	(7–4)
Pacific-10	Southwest
10	3
Head coach: Mike Price	Head coach: Chuck Reedy
AP / Coaches / BC; 24 / 23 / 25
	1	2	3	4	Total
Washington State	7	3	0	0	10
Baylor	0	0	3	0	3
- Date: December 31, 1994
- Season: 1994
- Stadium: Alamodome
- Location: San Antonio, Texas
- Favorite: Washington State by 5 points
- Referee: Terry Turlington (Big Eight)
- Attendance: 44,106

United States TV coverage
- Network: ESPN

The 1994 Alamo Bowl was the second edition of the college football bowl game and featured the Washington State Cougars of the Pacific-10 Conference and the Baylor Bears of the Southwest Conference. Part of the 1994–95 bowl schedule, it was played on New Year's Eve at the Alamodome in San Antonio, Texas.

Held on Saturday night, it was televised by ESPN and kicked off shortly after 7 p.m. CST. Washington State had the nation's second-ranked defense, and held Baylor to 151 yards of total offense.

The Cougars scored in the first quarter on a one-yard run by halfback Kevin Hicks to take a 7–0 lead. With under two minutes left in the first half, Tony Truant kicked a 37-yard field goal to put WSU up by ten at halftime. Late in the third quarter, Baylor scored its only points of the game on a 36-yard field goal by Jarvis Van Dyke, who had missed twice in the second quarter. Washington State was held scoreless in the second half, but won 10–3; they improved to 8–4 and climbed to #21 in the final AP poll

Baylor's next bowl appearance was sixteen years later in 2010.
