= 1994 Wake Forest Demon Deacons football team =

American college football season

1994 Wake Forest Demon Deacons football
- Conference: Atlantic Coast Conference
- Record: 3–8 (1–7 ACC)
- Head coach: Jim Caldwell (2nd season)
- Offensive coordinator: Alex Wood (2nd season)
- Offensive scheme: Pro-style
- Defensive coordinator: Chris Allen (2nd season)
- Base defense: 4–3
- Captains: Kevin Giles; Richard Goodpasture; Eddie McKeel; Matt McNeel
- Home stadium: Groves Stadium

1994 Atlantic Coast Conference football standings
	Conf.					Overall
Team	W		L		T	W		L		T
No. 4 Florida State $	8	–	0	–	0	10	–	1	–	1
No. 17 NC State	6	–	2	–	0	9	–	3	–	0
No. 15 Virginia	5	–	3	–	0	9	–	3	–	0
Duke	5	–	3	–	0	8	–	4	–	0
North Carolina	5	–	3	–	0	8	–	4	–	0
Clemson	4	–	4	–	0	5	–	6	–	0
Maryland	2	–	6	–	0	4	–	7	–	0
Wake Forest	1	–	7	–	0	3	–	8	–	0
Georgia Tech	0	–	8	–	0	1	–	10	–	0
$ – Conference champion; Rankings from AP Poll

The 1994 Wake Forest Demon Deacons football team was an American football team that represented Wake Forest University during the 1994 NCAA Division I-A football season. In their second season under head coach Jim Caldwell, the Demon Deacons compiled a 3–8 record and finished in eighth place in the Atlantic Coast Conference.

== Schedule ==
Date	Time	Opponent	Site	TV	Result	Attendance	Source
September 3	8:00 pm	at Vanderbilt*	Vanderbilt Stadium; Nashville, TN		L 14–35	31,203	
September 10	6:30 pm	Appalachian State*	Groves Stadium; Winston-Salem, NC		W 12–10	25,067	
September 17	6:30 pm	No. 3 Florida State	Groves Stadium; Winston-Salem, NC		L 14–56	20,317	
September 24	12:00 pm	at Maryland	Byrd Stadium; College Park, MD	JPS	L 7–31	24,787	
October 1	5:00 pm	Army*	Groves Stadium; Winston-Salem, NC		W 33–27	17,571	
October 8	6:30 pm	Virginia	Groves Stadium; Winston-Salem, NC		L 6–42	20,183	
October 15	1:00 pm	at NC State	Carter–Finley Stadium; Raleigh, NC (rivalry)		L 3–34	35,350	
October 22	1:00 pm	No. 20 Duke	Groves Stadium; Winston-Salem, NC (rivalry)		L 26–51	21,445	
October 29	1:00 pm	at Clemson	Memorial Stadium; Clemson, SC		L 8–24	66,998	
November 12	1:00 pm	North Carolina	Groves Stadium; Winston-Salem, NC (rivalry)		L 0–50	22,727	
November 19	1:00 pm	at Georgia Tech	Bobby Dodd Stadium; Atlanta, GA		W 20–13	35,706	
*Non-conference game; Rankings from AP Poll released prior to the game; All times are in Eastern time

== Team leaders ==
Category	Team Leader	Att/Cth	Yds
Passing	Rusty LaRue	132/230	1,303
Rushing	Sherron Gudger	78	261
Receiving	Roger Pettus	30	312
