= 1994 Texas A&M Aggies football team =

American college football season

1994 Texas A&M Aggies football
- Conference: Southwest Conference

Ranking
- AP: No. 8
- Record: 10–0–1 (6–0–1 SWC)
- Head coach: R. C. Slocum (6th season)
- Offensive coordinator: Steve Ensminger (1st season)
- Offensive scheme: Pro-style
- Defensive coordinator: Tommy Tuberville (1st season)
- Base defense: 3–4
- Home stadium: Kyle Field

1994 Southwest Conference football standings
	Conf.					Overall
Team	W		L		T	W		L		T
No. 8 Texas A&M *	6	–	0	–	1	10	–	0	–	1
No. 25 Texas +	4	–	3	–	0	8	–	4	–	0
Baylor +	4	–	3	–	0	7	–	5	–	0
TCU +	4	–	3	–	0	7	–	5	–	0
Texas Tech +	4	–	3	–	0	6	–	6	–	0
Rice +	4	–	3	–	0	5	–	6	–	0
Houston	1	–	6	–	0	1	–	10	–	0
SMU	0	–	6	–	1	1	–	9	–	1
+ – Conference co-champions; * – ineligible for championship and postseason due to NCAA sanctions; Rankings from AP Poll

The 1994 Texas A&M Aggies football team represented Texas A&M University as a member of the Southwest Conference (SWC) during the 1994 NCAA Division I-A football season. Led by sixth-year head coach R. C. Slocum, the Aggies compiled an overall record of 10–0–1 with a mark of 6–0–1 in conference play. Texas A&M has the best conference record of any team in the SWC, but due to National Collegiate Athletic Association (NCAA) sanctions, the Aggies were ineligible for the conference title, postseason play, and the Coaches Poll. The five teams that tied for the second-best record in the conference at 4–3 (Baylor, Rice, TCU, Texas, and Texas Tech) shared the SWC championship. Texas A&M was ranked No. 8 in the final AP poll. The team played home games at Kyle Field in College Station, Texas.

Due to the sanctions, Texas A&M was also banned from television for the 1994 season. Only one other team has been banned from television since, the 1995 Ole Miss Rebels. Coincidentally, Aggie defensive coordinator Tommy Tuberville left after this season to become Ole Miss' head coach. The television ban caused the traditional rivalry game with Texas to be moved from Thanksgiving night to the first Saturday of November. Texas instead played Baylor on Thanksgiving in a nationally-televised game.

== Schedule ==
Date	Time	Opponent	Rank	Site	Result	Attendance	Source
September 3	7:00 pm	at LSU*	No. 15	Tiger Stadium; Baton Rouge, LA (rivalry)	W 18–13	75,504	
September 10	4:00 pm	No. 15 Oklahoma*	No. 16	Kyle Field; College Station, TX	W 36–14	72,577	
September 24	4:00 pm	Southern Miss*	No. 13	Kyle Field; College Station, TX	W 41–17	56,007	
October 1	1:00 pm	Texas Tech	No. 10	Kyle Field; College Station, TX (rivalry)	W 23–17	64,242	
October 8	7:00 pm	at Houston	No. 10	Houston Astrodome; Houston, TX	W 38–7	40,184	
October 15	1:00 pm	Baylor	No. 7	Kyle Field; College Station, TX (Battle of the Brazos)	W 41–21	70,111	
October 22	1:00 pm	Rice	No. 6	Kyle Field; College Station, TX	W 7–0	56,214	
October 29	2:00 pm	vs. SMU	No. 7	Alamodome; San Antonio, TX	T 21–21	51,056	
November 5	1:00 pm	at Texas	No. 11	Texas Memorial Stadium; Austin, TX (rivalry)	W 34–10	82,312	
November 12	3:00 pm	at Louisville*	No. 9	Cardinal Stadium; Louisville, KY	W 26–10	36,112	
November 19	1:00 pm	TCU	No. 9	Kyle Field; College Station, TX (rivalry)	W 34–17	58,113	
*Non-conference game; Rankings from AP Poll released prior to the game; All times are in Central time

== Game summaries ==
=== LSU ===
The Aggies won their fourth straight vs. the Tigers for the first time in series history. All four wins came against coach Curley Hallman, an Aggie defensive back from 1966-68. Hallman was fired by LSU with two games remaining in the season.

	1	2	3	4	Total
#15 Texas A&M	3	6	0	9	18
LSU	0	7	6	0	13

=== Oklahoma ===
	1	2	3	4	Total
#15 Oklahoma	0	7	7	0	14
#16 Texas A&M	10	3	6	17	36

=== Southern Miss ===
	1	2	3	4	Total
Southern Miss	3	7	0	7	17
#12 Texas A&M	7	20	7	7	41

=== Texas Tech ===
	1	2	3	4	Total
Texas Tech	3	14	0	0	17
#10 Texas A&M	7	0	7	9	23

=== Houston ===
	1	2	3	4	Total
#10 Texas A&M	0	17	0	21	38
Houston	0	0	0	7	7

=== Baylor ===
	1	2	3	4	Total
#17 Baylor	0	7	7	7	21
#7 Texas A&M	3	7	14	17	41

=== Rice ===
	1	2	3	4	Total
Rice	0	0	0	0	0
#6 Texas A&M	7	0	0	0	7

=== SMU ===
The deadlock ruined the Aggies' unblemished season and removed any minuscule hope A&M could win the Associated Press national championship (probation rendered the Aggies ineligible to be ranked at all in the Coaches' Poll). It is the last tie for the Aggies and Mustangs, since the NCAA adopted overtime for regular season games starting in 1996.

	1	2	3	4	Total
#7 Texas A&M	0	0	7	14	21
SMU	7	7	0	7	21

=== Texas ===
	1	2	3	4	Total
#11 Texas A&M	14	10	7	3	34
Texas	0	0	7	3	10

=== Louisville ===
	1	2	3	4	Total
#9 Texas A&M	0	7	3	16	26
Louisville	7	0	0	3	10

=== TCU ===
	1	2	3	4	Total
TCU	7	3	0	7	17
#9 Texas A&M	7	10	7	10	34
