= 1994 Rice Owls football team =

American college football season

1994 Rice Owls football

SWC co-champion
- Conference: Southwest Conference
- Record: 5–6 (4–3 SWC)
- Head coach: Ken Hatfield (1st season)
- Offensive coordinator: David Lee (1st season)
- Offensive scheme: Flexbone
- Defensive coordinator: Wally Ake (1st season)
- Home stadium: Rice Stadium

1994 Southwest Conference football standings
	Conf.					Overall
Team	W		L		T	W		L		T
No. 8 Texas A&M *	6	–	0	–	1	10	–	0	–	1
No. 25 Texas +	4	–	3	–	0	8	–	4	–	0
Baylor +	4	–	3	–	0	7	–	5	–	0
TCU +	4	–	3	–	0	7	–	5	–	0
Texas Tech +	4	–	3	–	0	6	–	6	–	0
Rice +	4	–	3	–	0	5	–	6	–	0
Houston	1	–	6	–	0	1	–	10	–	0
SMU	0	–	6	–	1	1	–	9	–	1
+ – Conference co-champions; * – ineligible for championship and postseason due to NCAA sanctions; Rankings from AP Poll

The 1994 Rice Owls football team represented Rice University during the 1994 NCAA Division I-A football season. The Owls, led by first-year head coach Ken Hatfield, played their home games at Rice Stadium in Houston, Texas. The most notable win of the season was Rice's victory over Texas, their first victory over the Longhorns since 1965 (and as of 2023, their last). Due to Texas A&M being under sanctions from the NCAA, the Owls, along with Texas, Baylor, TCU, and Texas Tech, were all named co-champions of the Southwest Conference; all five teams had 4–3 conference win–loss records. This was Rice's first conference championship since 1957, and the team received championship rings. Rice did not win another conference title until 2013, when it was a member of Conference USA.

== Schedule ==
Date	Opponent	Site	TV	Result	Attendance	Source
September 10	Tulane*	Rice Stadium; Houston, TX		L 13–15	15,400	
September 17	at Kansas State*	KSU Stadium; Manhattan, KS		L 18–27	36,973	
September 24	at Iowa State*	Cyclone Stadium; Ames, IA		W 28–18	31,106	
October 8	Texas Tech	Rice Stadium; Houston, TX	Raycom	W 24–21	16,900	
October 16	No. 12 Texas	Rice Stadium; Houston, TX (rivalry)	ESPN	W 19–17	34,700	
October 22	at No. 6 Texas A&M	Kyle Field; College Station, TX		L 0–7	56,214	
October 29	at TCU	Amon G. Carter Stadium; Fort Worth, TX		L 25–27		
November 5	SMU^{†}	Rice Stadium; Houston, TX (rivalry)	Raycom	W 17–10	17,800	
November 12	Baylor	Rice Stadium; Houston, TX	ABC	L 14–19	28,100	
November 19	at Navy*	Navy–Marine Corps Memorial Stadium; Annapolis, MD		L 17–29		
November 26	at Houston	Houston Astrodome; Houston, TX (rivalry)		W 31–13	14,963	
*Non-conference game; ^{†}Homecoming; Rankings from Coaches' Poll released prior to the game
