= Mike O'Cain =

American football player and coach (born 1954)

Biographical details
- Born: July 20, 1954 (age 72)

Playing career
- 1974–1976: Clemson
- Positions: Quarterback, punter

Coaching career (HC unless noted)
- 1977: Clemson (GA)
- 1978–1980: The Citadel (RB)
- 1981–1984: Murray State (assistant)
- 1985: East Carolina (AHC)
- 1986–1992: NC State (QB)
- 1993–1999: NC State
- 2000: North Carolina (OC/QB)
- 2001–2003: Clemson (QB)
- 2004: Clemson (OC/QB)
- 2006–2012: Virginia Tech (QB)
- 2013: James Madison (OC/QB)
- 2014–2017: East Tennessee State (OC/QB)

Head coaching record
- Overall: 41–40
- Bowls: 1–2

Mike O'Cain (born July 20, 1954) is a former American college football coach and player. He served as the head football coach at North Carolina State University from 1993 to 1999, compiling a record of 41–40. O'Cain played football as a quarterback and punter at Clemson University from 1974 to 1976.

O'Cain was the offensive coordinator and quarterbacks coach for the East Tennessee State University football team from 2014 to 2017. He was the offensive coordinator at James Madison University in 2013, and served as quarterbacks coach at Virginia Tech from the 2006 to the 2012.

== Coaching career ==
Prior to joining Frank Beamer's staff at Virginia Tech, O'Cain was the offensive coordinator at Clemson University. Under O'Cain, Clemson had ranked nationally among the top offenses in the NCAA. He has also served as an assistant coach at Murray State University, Virginia Tech, East Carolina University, and North Carolina State University. He was promoted to the head coaching position at NC State, and compiled a 41–40 record from 1993 to 1999. While with the Wolfpack, he recruited Philip Rivers, although he did not coach him.

== Broadcasting career ==
Immediately prior to assuming his role at Virginia Tech, O'Cain served as the color commentator for Hokie Playback, a rebroadcast of Virginia Tech's home football games.

== Head coaching record ==
Year	Team	Overall	Conference	Standing	Bowl/playoffs	Coaches^{#}	AP^{°}
NC State Wolfpack (Atlantic Coast Conference) (1993–1999)
1993	NC State	7–5	4–4	5th	L Hall of Fame		
1994	NC State	9–3	6–2	2nd	W Peach	17	17
1995	NC State	3–8	2–6	7th			
1996	NC State	3–8	3–5	T–6th			
1997	NC State	6–5	3–5	T–6th			
1998	NC State	7–5	5–3	T–4th	L MicronPC		
1999	NC State	6–6	3–5	T–5th			
NC State:		41–40	26–30				
Total:		41–40					
^{#}Rankings from final Coaches Poll.; ^{°}Rankings from final AP Poll.
