= 1994 Georgia Tech Yellow Jackets football team =

American college football season

1994 Georgia Tech Yellow Jackets football
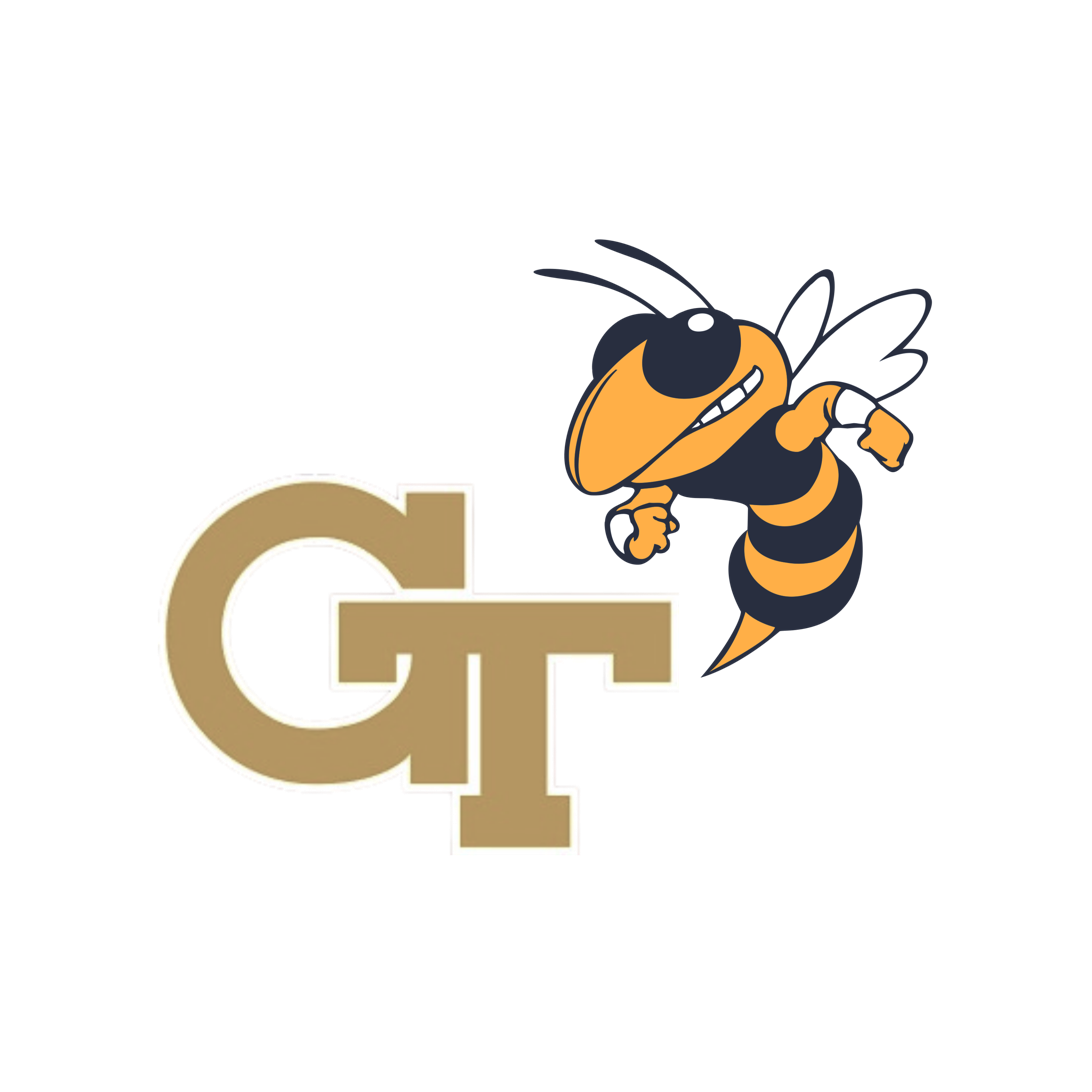
- Conference: Atlantic Coast Conference
- Record: 1–10 (0–8 ACC)
- Head coach: Bill Lewis (3rd season; first 8 games); George O'Leary (1st season; final 3 games)
- Co-offensive coordinators: Gary Crowton (1st season); Steve Shankweiler (3rd season)
- Defensive coordinator: George O'Leary (1st season)
- Home stadium: Bobby Dodd Stadium

1994 Atlantic Coast Conference football standings
	Conf.					Overall
Team	W		L		T	W		L		T
No. 4 Florida State $	8	–	0	–	0	10	–	1	–	1
No. 17 NC State	6	–	2	–	0	9	–	3	–	0
No. 15 Virginia	5	–	3	–	0	9	–	3	–	0
Duke	5	–	3	–	0	8	–	4	–	0
North Carolina	5	–	3	–	0	8	–	4	–	0
Clemson	4	–	4	–	0	5	–	6	–	0
Maryland	2	–	6	–	0	4	–	7	–	0
Wake Forest	1	–	7	–	0	3	–	8	–	0
Georgia Tech	0	–	8	–	0	1	–	10	–	0
$ – Conference champion; Rankings from AP Poll

The 1994 Georgia Tech Yellow Jackets football team represented the Georgia Institute of Technology in the 1994 NCAA Division I-A football season. The Yellow Jackets were led by head coach Bill Lewis through eight games, being fired after going 1–7. Defensive coordinator George O'Leary replaced Lewis as interim head coach for the remaining three games of the season. Georgia Tech played its home games at Bobby Dodd Stadium in Atlanta.

== Schedule ==
Date	Time	Opponent	Site	TV	Result	Attendance	Source
September 1	5:00 pm	No. 7 Arizona*	Bobby Dodd Stadium; Atlanta, GA	ESPN	L 14–19	45,112	
September 10		No. 17 (I-AA) Western Carolina*	Bobby Dodd Stadium; Atlanta, GA		W 45–26	40,012	
September 24		Duke	Bobby Dodd Stadium; Atlanta, GA		L 12–27	40,107	
October 1	3:30 pm	at No. 22 NC State	Carter–Finley Stadium; Raleigh, NC	ABC	L 13–21	43,216	
October 8	12:00 pm	at No. 14 North Carolina	Kenan Memorial Stadium; Chapel Hill, NC	JPS	L 24–31	52,200	
October 15	1:00 pm	Virginia	Bobby Dodd Stadium; Atlanta, GA		L 7–24	38,365	
October 22		at Maryland	Byrd Stadium; College Park, MD		L 27–42	30,429	
November 5	12:00 pm	No. 8 Florida State	Bobby Dodd Stadium; Atlanta, GA	JPS	L 10–41	45,206	
November 12	3:30 pm	at Clemson	Memorial Stadium; Clemson, SC (rivalry)	JPS	L 10–20	66,828	
November 19	1:00 pm	Wake Forest	Bobby Dodd Stadium; Atlanta, GA		L 13–20	35,706	
November 25	4:00 pm	at Georgia*	Sanford Stadium; Athen, GA (Clean, Old-Fashioned Hate)	ESPN	L 10–48	84,113	
*Non-conference game; Rankings from AP Poll released prior to the game; All times are in Eastern time

== Roster ==
1994 Georgia Tech Yellow Jackets football team roster
Players			Coaches
Offense: Pos. / # / Name / Class; QB / / Tom Luginbill / Sr	Defense: Pos. / # / Name / Class	Special teams: Pos. / # / Name / Class	Head coach: Bill Lewis; Coordinators/assistant coaches: Gary Crowton – Co-offensive coordinator/quarterbacks; Steve Shankweiler – Offensive Coordinator/offensive line; Greg Nord – Running backs; Rusty Burns – Wide receivers; Craig Cason – Tight ends/special teams; George O'Leary – Defensive coordinator/defensive line; Brian Baker – Outside linebackers; Dave Huxtable – Inside linebackers; Danny Smith – Defensive backs/assistant head coach; Legend: (C) Team captain; (S) Suspended; (I) Ineligible; Injured; Redshirt
