= 1994 Houston Cougars football team =

American college football season

1994 Houston Cougars football
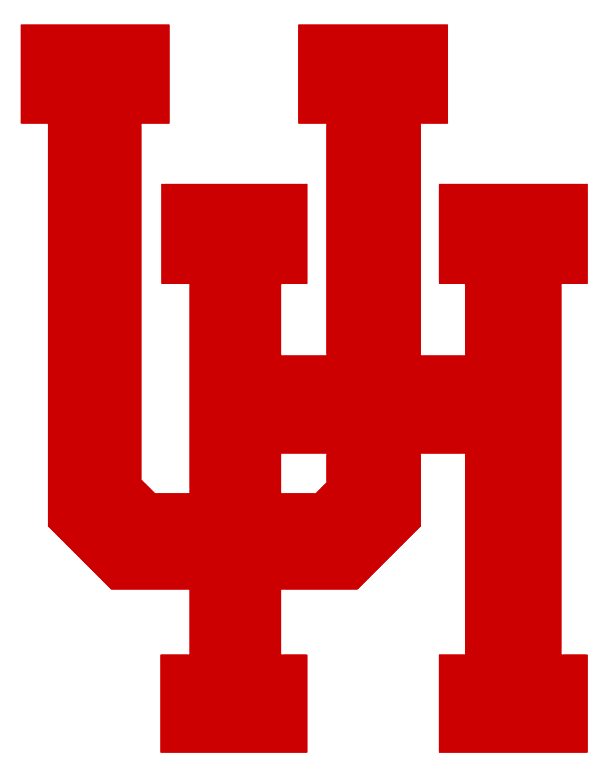
- Conference: Southwest Conference
- Record: 1–10 (1–6 SWC)
- Head coach: Kim Helton (2nd season)
- Offensive coordinator: Neil Callaway (2nd season)
- Offensive scheme: Pro-style
- Defensive coordinator: Gene Smith (2nd season)
- Base defense: 4–3
- Captains: Clay Helton; Mike Meux; Billy Milner; Alfred Young
- Home stadium: Houston Astrodome; Robertson Stadium

1994 Southwest Conference football standings
	Conf.					Overall
Team	W		L		T	W		L		T
No. 8 Texas A&M *	6	–	0	–	1	10	–	0	–	1
No. 25 Texas +	4	–	3	–	0	8	–	4	–	0
Baylor +	4	–	3	–	0	7	–	5	–	0
TCU +	4	–	3	–	0	7	–	5	–	0
Texas Tech +	4	–	3	–	0	6	–	6	–	0
Rice +	4	–	3	–	0	5	–	6	–	0
Houston	1	–	6	–	0	1	–	10	–	0
SMU	0	–	6	–	1	1	–	9	–	1
+ – Conference co-champions; * – ineligible for championship and postseason due to NCAA sanctions; Rankings from AP Poll

The 1994 Houston Cougars football team represented the University of Houston as a member of the Southwest Conference (SWC) during the 1994 NCAA Division I-A football season. Led by second-year head coach Kim Helton, the Cougars compiled an overall record of 1–10 with a mark of 1–6 in conference play, placing seventh in of the SWC. The team split its home games between the Houston Astrodome and Robertson Stadium. The Cougars played a home game on campus at Robertson Stadium for the first time since 1950.

== Schedule ==
Date	Time	Opponent	Site	TV	Result	Attendance	Source
September 1	7:00 pm	Kansas*	Houston Astrodome; Houston, TX		L 13–35	18,150	
September 10		at Louisiana Tech*	Joe Aillet Stadium; Ruston, LA		L 7–32	17,408	
September 17	7:00 pm	Missouri*	Houston Astrodome; Houston, TX		L 0–16	18,310	
September 24	1:00 pm	at No. 20 Ohio State*	Ohio Stadium; Columbus, OH		L 0–52	91,740	
October 7	7:00 pm	No. 10 Texas A&M^{†}	Houston Astrodome; Houston, TX		L 7–38	40,184	
October 15	12:00 pm	at SMU	Cotton Bowl; Dallas, TX (rivalry)	Raycom	W 39–33	11,400	
October 22		TCU	Robertson Stadium; Houston, TX		L 10–31	14,933	
October 29	1:00 pm	at Baylor	Floyd Casey Stadium; Waco, TX (rivalry)		L 13–52	34,869	
November 12	12:00 pm	at Texas	Texas Memorial Stadium; Austin, TX	Raycom	L 13–48	56,654	
November 19	12:00 pm	vs. Texas Tech	Alamodome; San Antonio, TX (rivalry)	Raycom	L 0–34	20,286	
November 26		Rice	Houston Astrodome; Houston, TX (rivalry)	Raycom	L 13–31	14,963	
*Non-conference game; ^{†}Homecoming; Rankings from AP Poll released prior to the game
