= 1994 Clemson Tigers football team =

American college football season

1994 Clemson Tigers football
- Conference: Atlantic Coast Conference
- Record: 5–6 (4–4 ACC)
- Head coach: Tommy West (1st season)
- Co-offensive coordinators: Rick Stockstill (1st season); Clyde Christensen (1st season)
- Defensive coordinator: Miles Aldridge (1st season)
- Captains: Tim Jones; Louis Solomon
- Home stadium: Memorial Stadium

1994 Atlantic Coast Conference football standings
	Conf.					Overall
Team	W		L		T	W		L		T
No. 4 Florida State $	8	–	0	–	0	10	–	1	–	1
No. 17 NC State	6	–	2	–	0	9	–	3	–	0
No. 15 Virginia	5	–	3	–	0	9	–	3	–	0
Duke	5	–	3	–	0	8	–	4	–	0
North Carolina	5	–	3	–	0	8	–	4	–	0
Clemson	4	–	4	–	0	5	–	6	–	0
Maryland	2	–	6	–	0	4	–	7	–	0
Wake Forest	1	–	7	–	0	3	–	8	–	0
Georgia Tech	0	–	8	–	0	1	–	10	–	0
$ – Conference champion; Rankings from AP Poll

The 1994 Clemson Tigers football team represented Clemson University as a member of the Atlantic Coast Conference (ACC) during the 1994 NCAA Division I-A football season. Led by first-year head coach Tommy West, the Tigers compiled an overall record of 5–6 with a mark of 4–4 in conference play, placing sixth in the ACC. Clemson played home games at Memorial Stadium in Clemson, South Carolina.

== Schedule ==
Date	Time	Opponent	Rank	Site	TV	Result	Attendance	Source
September 3	1:00 p.m.	Furman*	No. 24	Memorial Stadium; Clemson, SC		W 27–6	63,687	
September 10	1:00 p.m.	NC State	No. 22	Memorial Stadium; Clemson, SC (Textile Bowl)		L 12–29	67,127	
September 17	12:00 p.m.	at Virginia		Scott Stadium; Charlottesville, VA	JPS	L 6–9	39,000	
October 1	12:00 p.m.	Maryland		Memorial Stadium; Clemson, SC	JPS	W 13–0	67,819	
October 8	12:00 p.m.	at Georgia*		Sanford Stadium; Athens, GA (rivalry)	ABC	L 14–40	86,117	
October 15	12:00 p.m.	at No. 15 Duke		Wallace Wade Stadium; Durham, NC	JPS	L 13–19	29,432	
October 22	12:00 p.m.	at No. 7 Florida State		Doak Campbell Stadium; Tallahassee, FL (rivalry)	JPS	L 0–17	75,902	
October 29	1:00 p.m.	Wake Forest		Memorial Stadium; Clemson, SC		W 24–8	66,998	
November 5	1:30 p.m.	at No. 19 North Carolina		Kenan Memorial Stadium; Chapel Hill, NC		W 28–17	50,000	
November 12	3:30 p.m.	Georgia Tech		Memorial Stadium; Clemson, SC (rivalry)	JPS	W 20–10	66,828	
November 19	12:00 p.m.	South Carolina*		Memorial Stadium; Clemson, SC (rivalry)	JPS	L 7–33	85,872	
*Non-conference game; Rankings from AP Poll released prior to the game; All times are in Eastern time

== Roster ==
1994 Clemson Tigers football team roster
Players
Coaches
Offense

Pos.	#	Name	Class
QB	3	Patrick Sapp	Jr
FB	18	Emory Smith	So

Defense

Pos.	#	Name	Class
LB	12	Michael Barber	Sr
S	20	Brian Dawkins	Jr

Special teams

Pos.	#	Name	Class

Head coach

- Tommy West

Coordinators/assistant coaches

- Ellis Johnson (outside linebackers)

Legend

- (C) Team captain
- (S) Suspended
- (I) Ineligible
- Injured
- Redshirt

Roster
