= 1994 NC State Wolfpack football team =

American college football team season

1994 NC State Wolfpack football

Peach Bowl champion

Peach Bowl, W 28–24 vs. Mississippi State
- Conference: Atlantic Coast Conference

Ranking
- Coaches: No. 17
- AP: No. 17
- Record: 9–3 (6–2 ACC)
- Head coach: Mike O'Cain (2nd season)
- Offensive coordinator: Ted Cain (9th season)
- Defensive coordinator: Ken Pettus (1st season)
- Home stadium: Carter–Finley Stadium

1994 Atlantic Coast Conference football standings
	Conf.					Overall
Team	W		L		T	W		L		T
No. 4 Florida State $	8	–	0	–	0	10	–	1	–	1
No. 17 NC State	6	–	2	–	0	9	–	3	–	0
No. 15 Virginia	5	–	3	–	0	9	–	3	–	0
Duke	5	–	3	–	0	8	–	4	–	0
North Carolina	5	–	3	–	0	8	–	4	–	0
Clemson	4	–	4	–	0	5	–	6	–	0
Maryland	2	–	6	–	0	4	–	7	–	0
Wake Forest	1	–	7	–	0	3	–	8	–	0
Georgia Tech	0	–	8	–	0	1	–	10	–	0
$ – Conference champion; Rankings from AP Poll

The 1994 NC State Wolfpack football team represented North Carolina State University during the 1994 NCAA Division I-A football season. The team's head coach was Mike O'Cain. NC State has been a member of the Atlantic Coast Conference (ACC) since the league's inception in 1953. The Wolfpack played its home games in 1994 at Carter–Finley Stadium in Raleigh, North Carolina, which has been NC State football's home stadium since 1966.

== Schedule ==
Date	Time	Opponent	Rank	Site	TV	Result	Attendance	Source
September 1	7:00 pm	Bowling Green*		Carter–Finley Stadium; Raleigh, NC		W 20–15	42,150	
September 10	1:00 pm	at No. 22 Clemson		Memorial Stadium; Clemson, SC (Textile Bowl)		W 29–12	67,127	
September 24	7:00 pm	No. 14 (I-AA) Western Carolina*	No. 24	Carter–Finley Stadium; Raleigh, NC		W 38–13	43,000	
October 1	3:30 pm	Georgia Tech	No. 22	Carter–Finley Stadium; Raleigh, NC	ABC	W 21–13	43,216	
October 8	4:00 pm	at Louisville*	No. 18	Cardinal Stadium; Louisville, KY		L 14–35	38,318	
October 15	1:00 pm	Wake Forest		Carter–Finley Stadium; Raleigh, NC (rivalry)		W 34–3	35,350	
October 29	3:30 pm	at No. 24 North Carolina		Kenan Memorial Stadium; Chapel Hill, NC (rivalry)	ABC	L 17–31	54,300	
November 5	7:00 pm	at Maryland		Byrd Stadium; College Park, MD		W 47–45	27,126	
November 12	3:30 pm	No. 18 Duke		Carter–Finley Stadium; Raleigh, NC (rivalry)	JPS	W 24–23	53,900	
November 19	7:30 pm	No. 8 Florida State	No. 25	Carter–Finley Stadium; Raleigh, NC	ESPN	L 3–34	52,400	
November 25	11:00 am	at No. 13 Virginia		Scott Stadium; Charlottesville, VA	ABC	W 30–27	36,300	
January 1	8:00 pm	vs. No. 16 Mississippi State*	No. 23	Georgia Dome; Atlanta, GA (Peach Bowl)	ESPN	W 28–24	64,902	
*Non-conference game; Rankings from AP Poll released prior to the game; All times are in Eastern time
