= 1995 Cotton Bowl Classic =

1995 Mobil Cotton Bowl Classic
- 59th Cotton Bowl Classic
- The Cotton Bowl in Dallas, Texas, hosted the Cotton Bowl Classic.
| USC Trojans | Texas Tech Red Raiders |
| (7–3–1) | (6–5) |
| Pac-10 | SWC |
| 55 | 14 |
| Head coach: John Robinson | Head coach: Spike Dykes |
| AP / Coaches / BC; 21 / 22 / 22 |
| | 1 | 2 | 3 | 4 | Total |
|---|---|---|---|---|---|
| USC | 28 | 6 | 14 | 7 | 55 |
| Texas Tech | 0 | 0 | 7 | 7 | 14 |
- Date: January 2, 1995
- Season: 1994
- Stadium: Cotton Bowl
- Location: Dallas, Texas
- MVP: WR Keyshawn Johnson (USC); CB John Herpin (USC)
- Referee: Al Ford (SEC)
- Attendance: 70,218

United States TV coverage
- Network: NBC
- Announcers: Jim Lampley and Todd Christensen

The 1995 Mobil Cotton Bowl was the 59th Cotton Bowl Classic. The USC Trojans defeated the Texas Tech Red Raiders, 55–14. The Trojans took a 21–0 lead less than ten minutes into the game and led 34–0 at halftime. USC wide receiver Keyshawn Johnson, who finished with eight catches for a Cotton Bowl-record 222 yards and three touchdowns, was named offensive MVP. Trojan cornerback John Herpin had two interceptions, one for a touchdown, and was named defensive MVP.

The game was televised nationally by NBC for the third consecutive year. The Cotton Bowl Classic would return to its longtime television home, CBS, the next year. It was also the last year that Mobil served as the game's title sponsor; the following year, the Cotton Bowl organizers began a seventeen-year relationship with what is now AT&T.

== Background ==
=== SWC's final Cotton Bowl ===
Beginning with the 1940 season, the Cotton Bowl was officially hosted by the SWC's designated champion, and was operated by the SWC.

In late February 1994, Texas, Texas A&M, Baylor, and Texas Tech accepted invitations to join with the members of the Big Eight Conference to form the Big 12 Conference. In April 1994, Rice, SMU, and TCU accepted invitations to join the Western Athletic Conference. In 1995, Houston agreed to join Conference USA. The SWC would officially dissolve in the spring of 1996.

In 1994 it was announced that the Bowl Alliance would be replacing the Bowl Coalition in 1995. The major difference between the two was the number of "Tier 1" bowls shrunk from four to three. In August 1994, after hearing proposals from each bowl, the Alliance announced that the Fiesta, Orange, and Sugar would be the three "Tier 1" bowls. The Cotton Bowl was left out of the Alliance. Coupled with the 1995 SWC champion being granted an at-large bid to an Alliance bowl, the SWC gave up control of the Cotton Bowl. This assured that the 59th Cotton Bowl Classic would be the final appearance by the SWC champion.

== Match-up ==
=== SWC five team tiebreaker ===
Texas A&M finished atop the 1994 SWC standings (6-0-1). However the Aggies were ineligible to participate in a bowl game due to NCAA sanctions. Following A&M in the standings was a logjam of five teams, Texas Tech, Texas, Baylor, Rice, TCU, all with a 4-3-0 conference record. The SWC's official tiebreaker procedure regarding three or more teams was twofold. Step 1; head to head results. This step did not apply as the five teams all went 2-2-0 against each other. The final step, last used in 1975, was simple: the team with the longest Cotton Bowl appearance drought would be placed first. Based on this, Texas Tech, which had never represented the SWC in the Cotton Bowl since joining the conference in 1960, won the tiebreaker.

| Team | Most Recent Cotton Bowl Appearance | Cotton Bowls Hosted as Designated SWC Champion |
|---|---|---|
| Texas Tech | 1938 | 0 |
| Rice | 1957 | 3 |
| TCU | 1958 | 5 |
| Baylor | 1980 | 2 |
| Texas | 1990 | 19 |

=== Texas Tech Red Raiders ===
The Red Raiders finished 1–3 against ranked opponents, beating #19 Texas, but losing to #1 Nebraska, #21 Oklahoma, and #10 Texas A&M.

=== USC Trojans ===
USC's appearance was only the third in Cotton Bowl history by a team from the Pacific-10 Conference, following that of Oregon in 1949 and UCLA in 1989.

== Scoring summary ==
- USC - Shawn Walters 11-yard touchdown run (Ford kick), 6:51 remaining
- USC - Terry Barnum 19-yard touchdown pass from Rob Johnson (Ford kick), 6:39 remaining
- USC - John Herpin 26-yard interception return (Ford kick), 5:35 remaining
- USC - Keyshawn Johnson 12-yard touchdown pass from R. Johnson (Ford kick), 2:22 remaining
- USC - Ford 39-yard field goal, 6:50 remaining
- USC - Ford 42-yard field goal, 0:17 remaining
- USC - K. Johnson 22-yard touchdown pass from R. Johnson (Ford kick), 10:29 remaining
- USC - K. Johnson 86-yard touchdown pass from R. Johnson (Ford kick), 7:51 remaining
- Texas Tech - Zebbie Lethridge 5-yard touchdown run (Davis kick), 2:15 remaining
- USC - Jeff Diltz 2-yard touchdown pass from Brad Otton (Ford kick), 2:40 remaining
- Texas Tech - Stacy Mitchell 45-yard touchdown pass from Sone Cavazos (Davis kick), 0:00 remaining

Wide receiver Keyshawn Johnson caught 8 passes for 222 yards and 3 touchdowns as USC trounced Texas Tech, who did not score until it was 48–0.

== Statistics ==
| Statistics | Texas Tech | USC |
|---|---|---|
| First downs | 14 | 21 |
| Rushing yards | 55 | 143 |
| Passing yards | 205 | 435 |
| Total offense | 260 | 578 |
| Passing | 15-37-2 | 24–35–0 |
| Punts-Average | 10–38.0 | 4-43.0 |
| Return yards | 4 | 63 |
| Fumbles-Lost | 4-2 | 1-1 |
| Penalties-Yards | 2-20 | 12–133 |
