= 1994 Sun Bowl =

American college football game

- 61st Sun Bowl
Texas Longhorns	North Carolina Tar Heels
(7–4)	(8–3)
SWC	ACC
35	31
Head coach: John Mackovic	Head coach: Mack Brown
	AP / Coaches / BC; 19 / 14 / 17
	1	2	3	4	Total
Texas	7	14	0	14	35
North Carolina	7	10	0	14	31
- Date: December 29, 1994
- Season: 1994
- Stadium: Sun Bowl
- Location: El Paso, Texas
- MVP: Priest Holmes (RB, Texas)
- Referee: Chuck McFerrin (Pac-10)
- Attendance: 50,612

United States TV coverage
- Network: CBS
- Announcers: Jim Nantz, Doug Flutie and Andrea Joyce

The 1994 Sun Bowl was a college football bowl game played on December 29, 1994. The game pitted the unranked Texas Longhorns against the No. 19 North Carolina Tar Heels. The Tar Heels were led by eventual Texas head coach Mack Brown.

The game was a seesaw offensive battle. Texas, down 31–21 midway through the fourth quarter, mounted a comeback to gain a 35–31 victory, with Priest Holmes's leap into the endzone proving to be the winning points. Priest Holmes had 161 yards on 27 carries for four touchdowns to lead the Longhorns to victory and give him MVP honors. A record 50,612 attended this game, a high for both the bowl game and the stadium.

This was the first time since 1988 that the Sun Bowl was played under its original name after five years of title sponsorship from John Hancock Insurance.

== Scoring summary ==
First quarter

- North Carolina – Curtis Johnson 11-yd run (Tripp Pignetti kick); Drive: 10 plays, 78 yards, 11:06 remaining
- Texas – Priest Holmes 1-yd run (Phil Dawson kick); Drive: 9 plays, 72 yards, 4:37 remaining

Second quarter

- Texas – Norman Watkins 8-yd fumble return (Dawson kick), 14:49 remaining
- North Carolina – Pignetti 25-yd field goal; Drive: 12 plays, 72 yards, 9:57 remaining
- Texas – Holmes 1-yd run (Dawson kick); Drive: 9 plays, 64 yards, 6:05 remaining
- North Carolina – Marcus Wall 8-yd pass from Mike Thomas (Pignetti kick); Drive: 9 plays, 74 yards, :28 remaining

Fourth quarter

- North Carolina – Wall 82-yd punt return (Pignetti kick), 13:35 remaining
- North Carolina – Octavus Barnes 50-yd pass from Thomas (Pignetti kick); Drive: 5 plays, 79 yards, 9:13 remaining
- Texas – Holmes 9-yd run (Dawson kick); Drive: 8 plays, 68 yards, 6:35 remaining
- Texas – Holmes 5-yd run (Dawson kick); Drive: 10 plays, 68 yards, 1:17 remaining

== Statistics ==
Statistics	Texas	North Carolina
First downs	26	25
Rushing yards	229	180
Passing yards	196	298
Total offense	425	478
Return yards	98	115
Passing (C–A–I)	15–32–1	23–40–1
Fumbles–lost	3–1	2–1
Penalties–yards	7–55	6–58
Punts–average	6–35.8	5–35.4
Possession time	31:15	28:45
