= 1994 Virginia Cavaliers football team =

American college football season

1994 Virginia Cavaliers football

Independence Bowl champion

Independence Bowl, W 20–10 vs. TCU
- Conference: Atlantic Coast Conference

Ranking
- Coaches: No. 13
- AP: No. 15
- Record: 9–3 (5–3 ACC)
- Head coach: George Welsh (13th season)
- Offensive coordinator: Tom O'Brien (4th season)
- Defensive coordinator: Rick Lantz (4th season)
- Captains: Mike Frederick; Randy Neal; Charles Way
- Home stadium: Scott Stadium

1994 Atlantic Coast Conference football standings
	Conf.					Overall
Team	W		L		T	W		L		T
No. 4 Florida State $	8	–	0	–	0	10	–	1	–	1
No. 17 NC State	6	–	2	–	0	9	–	3	–	0
No. 15 Virginia	5	–	3	–	0	9	–	3	–	0
Duke	5	–	3	–	0	8	–	4	–	0
North Carolina	5	–	3	–	0	8	–	4	–	0
Clemson	4	–	4	–	0	5	–	6	–	0
Maryland	2	–	6	–	0	4	–	7	–	0
Wake Forest	1	–	7	–	0	3	–	8	–	0
Georgia Tech	0	–	8	–	0	1	–	10	–	0
$ – Conference champion; Rankings from AP Poll

The 1994 Virginia Cavaliers football team represented the University of Virginia as a member of the Atlantic Coast Conference (ACC) during the 1994 NCAA Division I-A football season. Led by 13th-year head coach George Welsh, the Cavaliers compiled an overall record of 9–3 with a mark of 5–3 in conference play, placing in a three-way tie for third in the ACC. Virginia was invited to the Independence Bowl, where the Cavaliers defeated TCU. The team played home games at Scott Stadium in Charlottesville, Virginia.

== Schedule ==
Date	Time	Opponent	Rank	Site	TV	Result	Attendance	Source
September 3	3:30 pm	at No. 4 Florida State		Doak Campbell Stadium; Tallahassee, FL (Jefferson–Eppes Trophy)	ABC	L 17–41	74,551	
September 10	7:00 pm	at Navy*		Navy–Marine Corps Memorial Stadium; Annapolis, MD		W 47–10	25,463	
September 17	12:00 pm	Clemson		Scott Stadium; Charlottesville, VA	JPS	W 9–6	39,000	
October 1	1:00 pm	No. 8 (I-AA) William & Mary*^{†}		Scott Stadium; Charlottesville, VA		W 37–3	38,300	
October 8	6:30 pm	at Wake Forest		Groves Stadium; Winston-Salem, NC		W 42–6	20,183	
October 15	1:00 pm	at Georgia Tech		Bobby Dodd Stadium; Atlanta, GA		W 24–7	38,365	
October 22	3:30 pm	No. 15 North Carolina	No. 25	Scott Stadium; Charlottesville, VA (South's Oldest Rivalry)	ABC	W 34–10	42,800	
November 5	12:00 pm	at No. 23 Duke	No. 13	Wallace Wade Stadium; Durham, NC	JPS	L 25–28	33,941	
November 12	1:00 pm	Maryland	No. 21	Scott Stadium; Charlottesville, VA (rivalry)		W 46–21	40,900	
November 19	12:00 pm	at No. 14 Virginia Tech*	No. 16	Lane Stadium; Blacksburg, VA (rivalry)	BEN	W 42–23	53,157	
November 25	11:00 am	NC State	No. 13	Scott Stadium; Charlottesville, VA	ABC	L 27–30	36,300	
December 28	7:00 pm	vs. TCU*	No. 18	Independence Stadium; Shreveport, LA (Independence Bowl)	ESPN	W 20–10	27,242	
*Non-conference game; ^{†}Homecoming; Rankings from AP Poll released prior to the game; All times are in Eastern time

== Roster ==
1994 Virginia Cavaliers football team roster
Players
Coaches
Offense

Pos.	#	Name	Class
QB	13	Mike Groh
RB	21	Tiki Barber	So
FB	30	Charles Way
WR	81	Patrick Jeffers
WR	82	Tyrone Davis

Defense

Pos.	#	Name	Class
DB	27	Percy Ellsworth	Jr
LB	33	Jamie Sharper	So
LB	42	James Farrior	So
DE, DT	99	Ryan Kuehl	Sr

Special teams

Pos.	#	Name	Class

Head coach

- George Welsh

Coordinators/assistant coaches

- Jim Bollman (OL)

Legend

- (C) Team captain
- (S) Suspended
- (I) Ineligible
- Injured
- Redshirt

Roster
