= 1994 North Carolina Tar Heels football team =

American college football season

1994 North Carolina Tar Heels football

Sun Bowl, L 31–35 vs Texas
- Conference: Atlantic Coast Conference

Ranking
- Coaches: No. 21
- Record: 8–4 (5–3 ACC)
- Head coach: Mack Brown (7th season)
- Offensive scheme: Multiple
- Defensive coordinator: Carl Torbush (7th season)
- Base defense: 4–3
- Captains: Jimmy Hitchcock; William Henderson; Mike Morton; Jason Stanicek
- Home stadium: Kenan Memorial Stadium

1994 Atlantic Coast Conference football standings
	Conf.					Overall
Team	W		L		T	W		L		T
No. 4 Florida State $	8	–	0	–	0	10	–	1	–	1
No. 17 NC State	6	–	2	–	0	9	–	3	–	0
No. 15 Virginia	5	–	3	–	0	9	–	3	–	0
Duke	5	–	3	–	0	8	–	4	–	0
North Carolina	5	–	3	–	0	8	–	4	–	0
Clemson	4	–	4	–	0	5	–	6	–	0
Maryland	2	–	6	–	0	4	–	7	–	0
Wake Forest	1	–	7	–	0	3	–	8	–	0
Georgia Tech	0	–	8	–	0	1	–	10	–	0
$ – Conference champion; Rankings from AP Poll

The 1994 North Carolina Tar Heels football team represented the University of North Carolina at Chapel Hill during the 1994 NCAA Division I-A football season. The Tar Heels played their home games at Kenan Memorial Stadium in Chapel Hill, North Carolina and competed in the Atlantic Coast Conference. The team was led by head coach Mack Brown.

== Schedule ==
Date	Time	Opponent	Rank	Site	TV	Result	Attendance	Source
September 3	7:00 p.m.	TCU*	No. 18	Kenan Memorial Stadium; Chapel Hill, NC		W 27–17	52,000	
September 17	1:30 p.m.	Tulane*	No. 16	Kenan Memorial Stadium; Chapel Hill, NC		W 49–0	43,000	
September 24	7:30 p.m.	at No. 3 Florida State	No. 13	Doak Campbell Stadium; Tallahassee, FL	ESPN	L 18–31	78,111	
October 1	3:00 p.m.	at SMU*	No. 18	Ownby Stadium; University Park, TX		W 28–24	18,200	
October 8	12:10 p.m.	Georgia Tech	No. 14	Kenan Memorial Stadium; Chapel Hill, NC	JPS	W 31–24	52,200	
October 15	1:30 p.m.	Maryland	No. 15	Kenan Memorial Stadium; Chapel Hill, NC		W 41–17	48,500	
October 22	3:30 p.m.	at No. 25 Virginia	No. 15	Scott Stadium; Charlottesville, VA (South's Oldest Rivalry)	ABC	L 10–34	42,800	
October 29	3:30 p.m.	NC State	No. 24	Kenan Memorial Stadium; Chapel Hill, NC (rivalry)	ABC	W 31–17	54,300	
November 5	1:30 p.m.	Clemson	No. 19	Kenan Memorial Stadium; Chapel Hill, NC		L 17–28	50,000	
November 12	1:00 p.m.	at Wake Forest		Groves Stadium; Winston-Salem, NC (rivalry)		W 50–0	22,727	
November 19	12:00 p.m.	at No. 24 Duke		Wallace Wade Stadium; Durham, NC (Victory Bell)	JPS	W 41–40	40,103	
December 30	2:30 p.m.	vs. Texas*	No. 19	Sun Bowl; El Paso, TX (Sun Bowl)	CBS	L 31–35	50,612	
*Non-conference game; Rankings from AP Poll released prior to the game; All times are in Eastern time

== Roster ==
1994 North Carolina Tar Heels football team roster
Players
Coaches
Offense

Pos.	#	Name	Class
TB	12	Leon Johnson	So
TE	85	Greg DeLong	Sr
TE	92	Freddie Jones	So

Defense

Pos.	#	Name	Class
S	2	Omar Brown	Fr
DB	18	Jimmy Hitchcock	Sr
LB	41	Brian Simmons	Fr
LB	53	Kivuusama Mays	Fr
LB	54	James Hamilton	So
DT	70	Andre Purvis	So
LB	82	Mike Morton	Sr
DT	94	Rick Terry	So
DT	97	Riddick Parker	Sr

Special teams

Pos.	#	Name	Class
DS	69	Stu Holt	Sr

Head coach

- Mack Brown

Coordinators/assistant coaches

- E. J. Sandusky (graduate assistant)

Legend

- (C) Team captain
- (S) Suspended
- (I) Ineligible
- Injured
- Redshirt

Roster
