= 1994 Duke Blue Devils football team =

American college football season

1994 Duke Blue Devils football

Hall of Fame Bowl, L 20–34 vs. Wisconsin
- Conference: Atlantic Coast Conference
- Record: 8–4 (5–3 ACC)
- Head coach: Fred Goldsmith (1st season)
- Offensive coordinator: Mike Heimerdinger (1st season)
- Defensive coordinator: Craig Bohl (1st season)
- MVP: Robert Baldwin
- Captains: Zaid Abdul-Aleem; Robert Baldwin; Matt Williams

1994 Atlantic Coast Conference football standings
	Conf.					Overall
Team	W		L		T	W		L		T
No. 4 Florida State $	8	–	0	–	0	10	–	1	–	1
No. 17 NC State	6	–	2	–	0	9	–	3	–	0
No. 15 Virginia	5	–	3	–	0	9	–	3	–	0
Duke	5	–	3	–	0	8	–	4	–	0
North Carolina	5	–	3	–	0	8	–	4	–	0
Clemson	4	–	4	–	0	5	–	6	–	0
Maryland	2	–	6	–	0	4	–	7	–	0
Wake Forest	1	–	7	–	0	3	–	8	–	0
Georgia Tech	0	–	8	–	0	1	–	10	–	0
$ – Conference champion; Rankings from AP Poll

The 1994 Duke Blue Devils football team represented Duke University as a member of the Atlantic Coast Conference (ACC) during the 1994 NCAA Division I-A football season. Led by first-year head coach Fred Goldsmith, the Blue Devils compiled an overall record of 8–4 with a mark of 5–3 in conference play, and finished tied for third in the ACC. Duke played home games at Wallace Wade Stadium in Durham, North Carolina.

== Schedule ==
Date	Time	Opponent	Rank	Site	TV	Result	Attendance	Source
September 3		Maryland		Wallace Wade Stadium; Durham, NC		W 49–16	20,831	
September 10	7:00 p.m.	East Carolina*		Wallace Wade Stadium; Durham, NC		W 13–10	36,420	
September 15		Army*		Wallace Wade Stadium; Durham, NC		W 43–7	24,342	
September 24		at Georgia Tech		Bobby Dodd Stadium; Atlanta, GA		W 27–12	40,107	
October 1		at Navy*		Navy–Marine Corps Memorial Stadium; Annapolis, MD		W 47–14	25,579	
October 15	12:00 p.m.	Clemson	No. 25	Wallace Wade Stadium; Durham, NC	JPS	W 19–13	29,432	
October 22	1:00 p.m.	at Wake Forest	No. 20	Groves Stadium; Winston-Salem, NC (rivalry)		W 51–26	21,445	
October 29	12:00 p.m.	at No. 9 Florida State	No. 16	Doak Campbell Stadium; Tallahassee, FL	JPS	L 20–59	73,889	
November 5	12:00 p.m.	No. 13 Virginia	No. 23	Wallace Wade Stadium; Durham, NC	JPS	W 28–25	33,941	
November 12	3:30 p.m.	at NC State	No. 19	Carter–Finley Stadium; Raleigh, NC (rivalry)		L 23–24	53,900	
November 19	12:00 p.m.	North Carolina^{†}	No. 25	Wallace Wade Stadium; Durham, NC (Victory Bell)		L 40–41	40,103	
January 2	11:00 a.m.	vs. Wisconsin*	No. 25	Tampa Stadium; Tampa, FL (Hall of Fame Bowl)	ESPN	L 20–34	61,384	
*Non-conference game; ^{†}Homecoming; Rankings from AP Poll released prior to the game; All times are in Eastern time
