= 1994 TCU Horned Frogs football team =

American college football season

1994 TCU Horned Frogs football

SWC co-champion

Independence Bowl, L 10–20 vs. Virginia
- Conference: Southwest Conference
- Record: 7–5 (4–3 SWC)
- Head coach: Pat Sullivan (3rd season)
- Offensive coordinator: Pete Hoener (3rd season)
- Defensive coordinator: Pat Henderson (1st season)
- Home stadium: Amon G. Carter Stadium

1994 Southwest Conference football standings
	Conf.					Overall
Team	W		L		T	W		L		T
No. 8 Texas A&M *	6	–	0	–	1	10	–	0	–	1
No. 25 Texas +	4	–	3	–	0	8	–	4	–	0
Baylor +	4	–	3	–	0	7	–	5	–	0
TCU +	4	–	3	–	0	7	–	5	–	0
Texas Tech +	4	–	3	–	0	6	–	6	–	0
Rice +	4	–	3	–	0	5	–	6	–	0
Houston	1	–	6	–	0	1	–	10	–	0
SMU	0	–	6	–	1	1	–	9	–	1
+ – Conference co-champions; * – ineligible for championship and postseason due to NCAA sanctions; Rankings from AP Poll

The 1994 TCU Horned Frogs football team represented Texas Christian University (TCU) in the 1994 NCAA Division I-A football season. The Horned Frogs finished the season 7–5 overall and 4–3 in the Southwest Conference. The team was coached by Pat Sullivan, in his third year as head coach. The Frogs played their home games in Amon G. Carter Stadium, which is located on campus in Fort Worth, Texas. They were invited to the Independence Bowl where they lost to Virginia by a score of 20–10.

== Schedule ==
Date	Time	Opponent	Site	TV	Result	Attendance	Source
September 3	7:00 p.m.	at No. 18 North Carolina*	Kenan Memorial Stadium; Chapel Hill, NC		L 17–27	52,000	
September 10		at New Mexico*	University Stadium; Albuquerque, NM		W 44–29		
September 17		Kansas*	Amon G. Carter Stadium; Fort Worth, TX		W 44–29	37,313	
September 24	7:00 p.m.	No. 15 Texas	Amon G. Carter Stadium; Fort Worth, TX (rivalry)	PPV	L 18–34	44,821	
October 1	12:00 p.m.	Baylor	Amon G. Carter Stadium; Fort Worth, TX (rivalry)	Raycom	L 18–42	32,405	
October 15		at Tulane*	Louisiana Superdome; New Orleans, LA		W 30–28	23,561	
October 22		at Houston	Robertson Stadium; Houston, TX		W 31–10		
October 29		Rice	Amon G. Carter Stadium; Fort Worth, TX		W 27–25		
November 12	2:00 p.m.	at SMU	Ownby Stadium; Dallas, TX (rivalry)		W 35–14	20,463	
November 19	1:00 p.m.	at No. 9 Texas A&M	Kyle Field; College Station, TX (rivalry)		L 17–34	58,113	
November 25	12:00 p.m.	Texas Tech	Amon G. Carter Stadium; Fort Worth, TX (rivalry)	ABC	W 24–17	43,219	
December 28	7:00 p.m.	vs. No. 18 Virginia*	Independence Stadium; Shreveport, LA (Independence Bowl)	ESPN	L 10–20	36,192	
*Non-conference game; Rankings from AP Poll released prior to the game; All times are in Central time
