= 1994 Texas Longhorns football team =

American college football season

1994 Texas Longhorns football

SWC co-champion Sun Bowl champion

Sun Bowl, W 35–31 vs. North Carolina
- Conference: Southwest Conference

Ranking
- Coaches: No. 23
- AP: No. 25
- Record: 8–4 (4–3 SWC)
- Head coach: John Mackovic (3rd season)
- Offensive coordinator: Gene Dahlquist (3rd season)
- Defensive coordinator: Gary Darnell (1st season)
- Home stadium: Texas Memorial Stadium

1994 Southwest Conference football standings
	Conf.					Overall
Team	W		L		T	W		L		T
No. 8 Texas A&M *	6	–	0	–	1	10	–	0	–	1
No. 25 Texas +	4	–	3	–	0	8	–	4	–	0
Baylor +	4	–	3	–	0	7	–	5	–	0
TCU +	4	–	3	–	0	7	–	5	–	0
Texas Tech +	4	–	3	–	0	6	–	6	–	0
Rice +	4	–	3	–	0	5	–	6	–	0
Houston	1	–	6	–	0	1	–	10	–	0
SMU	0	–	6	–	1	1	–	9	–	1
+ – Conference co-champions; * – ineligible for championship and postseason due to NCAA sanctions; Rankings from AP Poll

The 1994 Texas Longhorns football team represented the University of Texas at Austin as a member of the Southwest Conference (SWC) during the 1994 NCAA Division I-A football season. Led by third-year head coach John Mackovic, the Longhorns compiled an overall record of 8–4 with a mark of 4–3 in conference play, placing in a five-way tie for second in the SWC. Texas A&M, which finished with the best record of any team in the SWC play at 6–0–1, was ineligible for the conference title due to National Collegiate Athletic Association (NCAA) sanctions. Thus, Texas shared the SWC title with the other four second-place finishers: Baylor, Rice, TCU, and Texas Tech. The Longhorns were invited to the Sun Bowl, where they defeated North Carolina. The team played home games at Texas Memorial Stadium in Austin, Texas.

Texas lost to Rice in October October 16, having previously beaten the Owls 28 straight times in the Rice–Texas football rivalry, dating back to 1965. This remains the last time Longhorns have lost to Rice through the 2024 season. Texas did not close the regular season with its traditional rivalry game against Texas A&M, due to the sanctions against the Aggies, which also banned them from appearing on television. The Longhorns instead played the regular season finale against Baylor in a nationally televised game on Thanksgiving, having played Texas A&M three weeks earlier.

== Schedule ==
Date	Time	Opponent	Rank	Site	TV	Result	Attendance	Source
September 3	11:00 a.m.	at Pittsburgh*	No. 18	Pitt Stadium; Pittsburgh, PA	Raycom	W 30–28	32,337	
September 10	2:30 p.m.	Louisville*	No. 20	Texas Memorial Stadium; Austin, TX	ABC	W 30–16	64,627	
September 24	7:00 p.m.	at TCU	No. 15	Amon G. Carter Stadium; Fort Worth, TX (rivalry)	PPV	W 34–18	44,821	
October 1	2:30 p.m.	No. 4 Colorado*	No. 16	Texas Memorial Stadium; Austin, TX	ABC	L 31–34	77,809	
October 8	2:30 p.m.	vs. No. 16 Oklahoma*	No. 15	Cotton Bowl; Dallas, TX (Red River Shootout)	ABC	W 17–10	75,587	
October 16	7:00 p.m.	at Rice	No. 12	Rice Stadium; Houston, TX (rivalry)	ESPN	L 17–19	34,700	
October 22	12:00 p.m.	SMU	No. 13	Texas Memorial Stadium; Austin, TX	Raycom	W 42–20	61,307	
October 29	12:00 p.m.	at Texas Tech	No. 19	Jones Stadium; Lubbock, TX (rivalry)	Raycom	L 9–33	45,591	
November 5	1:00 p.m.	No. 11 Texas A&M		Texas Memorial Stadium; Austin, TX (rivalry)		L 10–34	82,312	
November 12	12:00 p.m.	Houston		Texas Memorial Stadium; Austin, TX	Raycom	W 48–13	56,654	
November 24	10:00 a.m.	at Baylor		Floyd Casey Stadium; Waco, TX (rivalry)	ABC	W 63–35	41,212	
December 30	12:30 p.m.	vs. No. 19 North Carolina*		Sun Bowl; El Paso, TX (Sun Bowl)	CBS	W 35–31	50,612	
*Non-conference game; Rankings from AP Poll released prior to the game; All times are in Central time

== Game summaries ==
=== Oklahoma ===
Oklahoma Sooners (3–1) vs. Texas Longhorns (3–1)

Quarter	1	2	3	4	Total
Texas	0	0	10	7	17
Oklahoma	0	7	0	3	10

at Cotton Bowl • Dallas, Texas

- Date: October 8
- Game time: 2:30 p.m.
- Game weather: Partly sunny • 70 °F (21 °C) • Wind 15 mph (24 km/h) N
- Game attendance: 75,587
- Referee: Dale
- TV: ABC
- Texas Sports

Game information

Texas

- James Brown
  17/22, 148 Yds, TD, INT
- Rodrick Walker
  23 Rush, 77 Yds
- Eric Jackson
  2 Rec, 30 Yds

Oklahoma

- Garrick McGee
  12/19, 192 Yds, INT
- James Allen
  19 Rush, 88 Yds
- Albert Hall
  4 Rec, 69 Yds

Stonie Clark tackled James Allen on the one-yard line on fourth down with less than 45 seconds remaining in the game.

Scoring summary

Quarter	Time	Drive			Team	Scoring information	Score	
Quarter	Time	Plays	Yards	TOP	Team	Scoring information	TEX	OU
2	11:43	6	88		Oklahoma	Moore 23-yard touchdown run, Blanton kick good	0	7
3	9:45	13	80		Texas	19-yard field goal by Dawson	3	7
3	0:17	15	81		Texas	Brown 9-yard touchdown run, Dawson kick good	10	7
4	13:05	5	21		Texas	Fitzgerald 2-yard touchdown reception from Brown, Dawson kick good	17	7
4	6:40	16	75		Oklahoma	22-yard field goal by Blanton	17	10
"TOP" = time of possession. For other American football terms, see Glossary of American football.							17	10

== Roster ==
1994 Texas Longhorns football team roster
Players
Coaches
Offense

Pos.	#	Name	Class
WR		Mike Adams
OT	78	Blake Brockermeyer	Jr
QB		James Brown	Fr
OL		Dominic Bustamante
TE		Pat Fitzgerald
WR		Eric Jackson
FB		Juan Kemp
RB		Rodrick Walker	Sr

Defense

Pos.	#	Name	Class
NG		Stonie Clark
LB		Tyson King
LB		Robert Reed	Jr
CB		Bryant Westbrook

Special teams

Pos.	#	Name	Class
K		Phil Dawson
P		Duane Vacek

Head coach

- John Mackovic

Coordinators/assistant coaches

Legend

- (C) Team captain
- (S) Suspended
- (I) Ineligible
- Injured
- Redshirt
