= 1995 Peach Bowl (January) =

American college football game

- 27th Peach Bowl
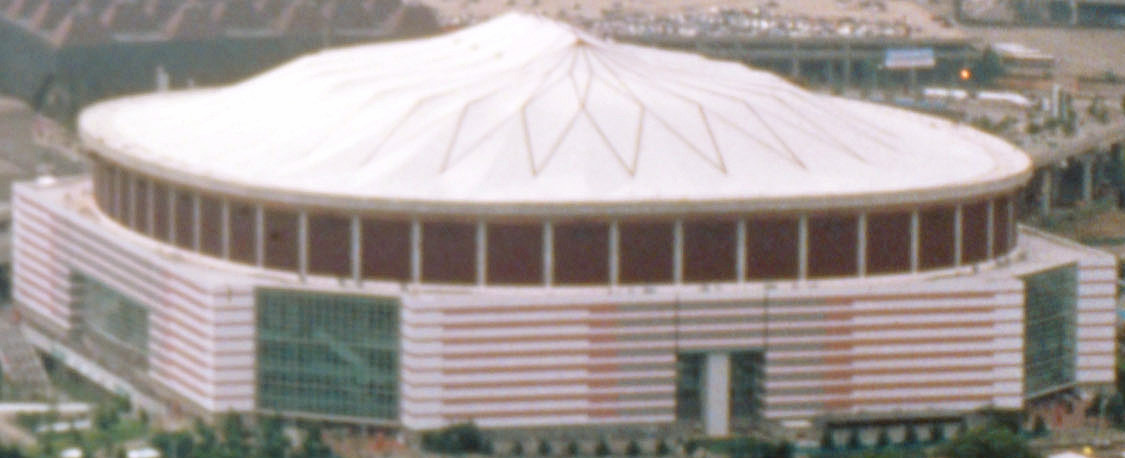
- The Georgia Dome in Atlanta, Georgia, hosted the Peach Bowl.
Mississippi State Bulldogs	NC State Wolfpack
(8–3)	(8–3)
SEC	ACC
24	28
Head coach: Jackie Sherrill	Head coach: Mike O'Cain
AP / Coaches / BC; 16 / 17 / 18	AP / Coaches / BC; 23 / 20 / 23
	1	2	3	4	Total
Mississippi State	6	7	8	3	24
NC State	7	6	8	7	28
- Date: January 1, 1995
- Season: 1994
- Stadium: Georgia Dome
- Location: Atlanta, Georgia
- MVP: Offense: RB Tremayne Stephens, NC State; K Tim Rogers, MSU; Defense: DT Carl Reeves, NC State; ILB Damien Covington, NC State; DL Larry Williams, MSU
- Referee: Tom Quinn (Big Ten)
- Attendance: 64,902

United States TV coverage
- Network: ESPN
- Announcers: Joel Meyers (play-by-play); Todd Blackledge (analysis)

The 1995 Peach Bowl, part of the 1994 bowl game season, featured the Mississippi State Bulldogs and the NC State Wolfpack.

NC State held Mississippi State to just one touchdown and five field goals on six Bulldog drives that reached the Wolfpack red zone during the game. Leading 13–10, the Bulldogs went three-and-out and missed a field goal late in the second quarter. The Wolfpack got the ball back and tied the game at 13 going into halftime.

After MSU picked up a safety and two field goals early in the third quarter, NC State tied the game at 21 on a touchdown pass from Terry Harvey to Dallas Dickerson and a two-point run by Harvey. After a three-and-out by MSU, Harvey led the Wolfpack on an 80-yard scoring drive to open the fourth quarter, largely based on a 62-yard pass to Jimmy Grissett, capped by a Carlos King 11-yard touchdown run.

On four subsequent drives over the balance of the fourth quarter, Mississippi State managed only four first downs and a field goal. The Bulldogs went 0-for-7 on third-down conversions and 0-for-1 on fourth-down tries in the second half.

With the win, NC State tied a school record with nine wins.
