= Mike Groh =

American football player and coach (born 1971)

Personal information
- Born: December 19, 1971 (age 54); Charlottesville, Virginia, U.S.
- Listed height: 6 ft 3 in (1.91 m)
- Listed weight: 204 lb (93 kg)

Career information
- Position: Quarterback
- High school: Randolph (NJ)
- College: Virginia
- NFL draft: 1996: undrafted

Career history

Playing
- Baltimore Ravens (1996)*; Rhein Fire (1997)
- * Offseason or practice squad member only

Coaching
- New York Jets (2000) Assistant; Virginia (2001–2002) Wide receivers coach; Virginia (2003) Quarterbacks coach & wide receivers coach; Virginia (2004– 2005) Quarterbacks coach; Virginia (2006–2008) Offensive coordinator; Alabama (2009) Graduate assistant; Louisville (2010) Quarterbacks coach; Alabama (2011– 2012) Wide receivers coach & recruiting coordinator; Chicago Bears (2013–2015) Wide receivers coach; Los Angeles Rams (2016) Passing game coordinator & wide receivers coach; Philadelphia Eagles (2017) Wide receivers coach; Philadelphia Eagles (2018–2019) Offensive coordinator; Indianapolis Colts (2020–2021) Wide receivers coach; New York Giants (2022–2025) Wide receivers coach

Awards and highlights
- As coach: Super Bowl champion (LII); 3× National champion (2009, 2011, 2012); As player: Second-team All-ACC (1995)
- Coaching profile at Pro Football Reference

Albert Michael Groh III (born December 19, 1971) is an American football coach and former quarterback who was most recently the wide receivers coach for the New York Giants of the National Football League (NFL). He previously served as the wide receivers coach of the Indianapolis Colts and as an assistant coach for the Los Angeles Rams, Chicago Bears and New York Jets. He is a former starting quarterback at the University of Virginia.

== Playing career ==
=== High school ===
Groh attended Randolph High School in Randolph, New Jersey, graduating in 1991. He played football for the Randolph Rams, starting as the team's quarterback, safety, placekicker and punter.

In Groh's last game, Randolph faced off against Montclair High School on December 1, 1990, in the New Jersey North Section 2, Group 4 state championship game, which was held at Woodman Field in Montclair in what became of significance in the history of New Jersey high school athletics. While the matchup was already highly anticipated as it was the first-time meeting between the two storied New Jersey football programs, it was also further enhanced by several notable subplots. Randolph, ranked number two in the state, had entered the game sharing a state record for consecutive victories with 48 while Montclair was the top ranked team in the state and sixth in the United States. Ironically, it was on this very same field seventeen years earlier that Montclair had ended Westfield High's then state record 48 game unbeaten streak that Randolph was seeking to overtake.

For Groh and the Rams though, the game itself had taken on greater meaning as it was seventeen days after the sudden death of Randolph head coach John Bauer Sr. The legendary New Jersey high school coach and the face of the program had battled a long time illness but had not planned to retire until the winning streak was snapped so as not to burden his successor, his son, with sustaining the program's winning streak. Circumstances with the elder Bauer's death nonetheless forced his son John Jr., the team's offensive coordinator, to take over the head coaching duties streak intact as the team was headed into the playoffs. This included shutting out perennial state power Union High coached by the great Lou Rettino one week prior. But in this state championship game, Montclair was heavily favored as, despite having not lost a game in over four years, Randolph was in its first year playing Group 4 playoff competition which represented the largest schools in New Jersey. Previously the Rams had won four consecutive Group 3 state titles.

Groh's undersized Randolph team, with ten players playing both offense and defense and none weighing over two-hundred pounds, seemed at times to be outmatched during the game by the physically larger and more athletic Montclair team. But some fortunate breaks helped keep the Rams, a team especially known then for its grit and disciplined clutch play, in the game. This included an offensive fumble recovery in the end zone that resulted in an improbable Randolph touchdown.

However, the most improbable events occurred towards the end of the game with Groh's team trailing 21-19 and driving late in the game. With a little more than a minute remaining and already in field goal range, the Rams turned the ball over deep in Montclair territory and at which point many of the estimated fifteen thousand in attendance began to file out of the venue.

This final minute plus left in the game after the Randolph turnover proved to be controversial regarding the scoreboard clock management as literal seconds on the clock had become especially critical. Still debated, more recent local media recountings of this game have shown a more sympathetic stance towards the Montclair side of the story with allegations of officiating errors, but said recountings have also focused exclusively on the final thirty seconds of the game. Examination of the final Montclair possession in its entirety, however, reveals the officials arguably still ended up making a proper call on the crucial 4th down delay of game penalty. This was also noted in a 2000 article in the Newark Star Ledger, no longer available online, where the head official justified this call. Upon Randolph's turnover, while newspaper archives present the time left in the game at 1:11, two separate local cable television stations covering the game each confirm the turnover actually occurred at 1:17 at which point the clock should have stopped on the change of possession, indicating up to six seconds of unaccounted time was potentially run off.

Montclair's intent was to simply line up in victory formation, snap, kneel down on the ball and run the clock down as far as they could while Randolph still had two timeouts left. On first down, by the time the play was whistled dead for Randolph's first time out, the scoreboard operator had allowed the clock to run down to 0:50 from the aforementioned 1:17. Manual review and timing of the video on YouTube reveals a time gap of at least several seconds from the point the official had wound his arm to signal the start of clock run off to the first timeout whistle heard to stop the clock confirming some extra unaccounted time was indeed run off on this first down kneel down play. Given the time run off on these earlier downs, by the time Montclair lined up on 4th down, they were expecting to take a delay of game penalty and have approximately four seconds left to punt the ball out of their own endzone. However, another clock error resulted in the scoreboard clock ticking to zero and caused the Montclair fans to rush the field in apparent victory. This not only resulted in the delay of game penalty being called on Montclair, but the field officials determined the clock should have seven seconds left on it. Montclair next was only able to come up with an eleven-yard punt with Randolph's strong rush nearly blocking it. The punt itself also was noticeably held up by an improbable gust of wind, that was fair caught on the twenty yard line as the Randolph punt returner's knee touched the ground stopping the clock with exactly one second left. Groh then kicked the winning 37-yard field goal as time expired to give Randolph its miraculous record breaking victory and the de facto state championship in what The Star-Ledger of Newark later named the greatest New Jersey high school game ever played and was dubbed by local media as the "Miracle at Montclair". At a national level, MaxPreps, in a 2019 article, ranked the game as #3 in its "top 50 high school football games of all time".

=== College ===
Groh enrolled at the University of Virginia in the fall of 1991 and was redshirted as a true freshman. He served as a backup quarterback during his redshirt freshman season in 1992 and replaced struggling starter Bobby Goodman in a late season game against N.C. State. However, in the 1993 season, Groh lost the quarterback competition to fellow redshirt sophomore Symmion Willis and again served as a backup. In the first game of the 1994 season against Clemson, Groh alternated with Willis when the offense struggled during a 6–3 win. Groh and Willis continued to alternate at quarterback for the next few games until Groh emerged as the starting quarterback. The Cavaliers finished 9–3 for the 1994 season with a win over Texas Christian University in the Independence Bowl.

Groh led the Cavaliers to a 9–4 record in the 1995 season highlighted by a 33–28 win over Florida State, a share of the ACC Championship, and a win over Georgia in the Peach Bowl. In the 1995 season, UVA's only losses were by a touchdown or less to Michigan, Texas, North Carolina, and Virginia Tech. Groh's father Al Groh was hired as the head football coach at Virginia starting five years after Mike graduated.

== NFL Combine ==
Pre-draft measurables
Height	Weight	Arm length	Hand span	40-yard dash	10-yard split	20-yard split	20-yard shuttle	Vertical jump
6 ft 2 3/4 in (1.90 m)	204 lb (93 kg)	31 5/8 in (0.80 m)	9 in (0.23 m)	5.17 s	1.78 s	3.00 s	4.41 s	31.0 in (0.79 m)
All values from NFL Combine

== Coaching career ==
=== New York Jets ===
Groh was hired as an assistant for his father Al, who was head coach of the New York Jets in 2000.

=== Virginia ===
Groh was hired on the Virginia staff in 2001 as the wide receivers coach before he took on the task of coaching the Cavalier quarterbacks in 2003 along with the receivers. In 2006, he was named the team's offensive coordinator. He was relieved of the offensive coordinator position at the University of Virginia in December 2008.

=== Alabama ===
Groh spent the 2009 season at Alabama as an offensive graduate assistant as the Crimson Tide recorded a 14–0 record en route to the National Championship.

=== Louisville ===
Louisville Cardinals head coach Charlie Strong announced, on January 13, 2010, that he has hired Mike Groh to coach the quarterbacks at University of Louisville.

=== Return to Alabama ===
On February 7, 2011, it was announced he had been given the job of wide receivers coach at the University of Alabama.

=== Chicago Bears ===
On February 21, 2013, it was announced that Groh was hired by the Chicago Bears as wide receivers coach.

=== Los Angeles Rams ===
On January 25, 2016, the Los Angeles Rams announced they had hired Groh as their new passing game coordinator and wide receivers coach.

=== Philadelphia Eagles ===
On January 21, 2017, Groh was hired by the Philadelphia Eagles as their wide receivers coach under head coach Doug Pederson. In his first season with the Eagles, he won Super Bowl LII against the New England Patriots. One of the Eagles' touchdowns in the game came on a trick play called the Philly Special, which Groh had learned during his time in Chicago before introducing it to Pederson.

After the Super Bowl, Frank Reich was hired as head coach of the Indianapolis Colts, and Groh was promoted to offensive coordinator. Groh was fired from the Eagles on January 9, 2020, after they fell to the Seattle Seahawks in the Wild Card Round of the NFL Playoffs.

=== Indianapolis Colts ===
On February 1, 2020, Groh was hired by the Indianapolis Colts as their wide receivers coach, reuniting with former Philadelphia Eagles offensive coordinator and current Colts head coach Frank Reich.

=== New York Giants ===
On February 10, 2022, Groh was hired by the New York Giants as their wide receivers coach under head coach Brian Daboll.

Following the firing of Daboll in 2025, he was not retained in 2026 by incoming head coach John Harbaugh.

== Personal life ==
Groh is the son of former American football coach Al Groh and his brother, Matt, is the director of player personnel for the New England Patriots.
