= 1994 Baylor Bears football team =

American college football season

1994 Baylor Bears football

SWC co-champion

Alamo Bowl, L 3–10 vs. Washington State
- Conference: Southwest Conference
- Record: 7–5 (4–3 SWC)
- Head coach: Chuck Reedy (2nd season)
- Offensive coordinator: Jack Crowe (2nd season)
- Offensive scheme: I formation
- Defensive coordinator: Bob Cope (1st season)
- Base defense: 4–3
- Home stadium: Floyd Casey Stadium

1994 Southwest Conference football standings
| | Conf. | | | | | Overall |
| Team | W | | L | | T | W | | L | | T |
|---|---|---|---|---|---|---|---|---|---|---|
| No. 8 Texas A&M * | 6 | – | 0 | – | 1 | 10 | – | 0 | – | 1 |
| No. 25 Texas + | 4 | – | 3 | – | 0 | 8 | – | 4 | – | 0 |
| Baylor + | 4 | – | 3 | – | 0 | 7 | – | 5 | – | 0 |
| TCU + | 4 | – | 3 | – | 0 | 7 | – | 5 | – | 0 |
| Texas Tech + | 4 | – | 3 | – | 0 | 6 | – | 6 | – | 0 |
| Rice + | 4 | – | 3 | – | 0 | 5 | – | 6 | – | 0 |
| Houston | 1 | – | 6 | – | 0 | 1 | – | 10 | – | 0 |
| SMU | 0 | – | 6 | – | 1 | 1 | – | 9 | – | 1 |
+ – Conference co-champions; * – ineligible for championship and postseason due to NCAA sanctions; Rankings from AP Poll

The 1994 Baylor Bears football team represented Baylor University as a member of the Southwest Conference (SWC) during the 1994 NCAA Division I-A football season. Led by second-year head coach Chuck Reedy, the Bears compiled an overall record of 7–5 with a mark of 4–3 in conference play, sharing the SWC title with Rice, TCU, Texas, and Texas Tech. Baylor was invited to the Alamo Bowl, where the Bears lost to Washington State. The team played home games at Floyd Casey Stadium in Waco, Texas.

Baylor did not make another bowl game until the 2010 season.

== Schedule ==
| Date | Time | Opponent | Site | TV | Result | Attendance | Source |
|---|---|---|---|---|---|---|---|
| September 3 | 7:00 p.m. | Louisiana Tech* | Floyd Casey Stadium; Waco, TX | | W 44–3 | 28,769 | |
| September 10 | 8:00 p.m. | at San Jose State* | Spartan Stadium; San Jose, CA | | W 54–20 | 11,625 | |
| September 17 | 7:00 p.m. | Oklahoma State* | Floyd Casey Stadium; Waco, TX | | W 14–10 | 40,214 | |
| September 24 | 9:00 p.m. | at No. 19 USC* | Los Angeles Memorial Coliseum; Los Angeles, CA | PSN | L 27–37 | 45,762 | |
| October 1 | 12:00 p.m. | at TCU | Amon G. Carter Stadium; Fort Worth, TX (rivalry) | Raycom | W 42–18 | 32,405 | |
| October 8 | 1:00 p.m. | SMU | Floyd Casey Stadium; Waco, TX | | W 44–10 | 34,869 | |
| October 15 | 1:00 p.m. | at No. 7 Texas A&M | Kyle Field; College Station, TX (Battle of the Brazos) | | L 21–41 | 70,111 | |
| October 22 | 1:00 p.m. | at Texas Tech | Jones Stadium; Lubbock, TX (rivalry) | | L 7–38 | 29,443 | |
| October 29 | 1:00 p.m. | Houston^{†} | Floyd Casey Stadium; Waco, TX (rivalry) | | W 52–13 | 35,174 | |
| November 12 | 2:30 p.m. | at Rice | Rice Stadium; Houston, TX | ABC | W 19–14 | 28,100 | |
| November 24 | 10:00 a.m. | Texas | Floyd Casey Stadium; Waco, TX (rivalry) | ABC | L 35–63 | 41,212 | |
| December 31 | 7:00 p.m. | vs. Washington State* | Alamodome; San Antonio, TX (Alamo Bowl) | ESPN | L 3–10 | 44,106 | |
*Non-conference game; ^{†}Homecoming; Rankings from AP Poll released prior to the game; All times are in Central time
