= 1994 Florida State Seminoles football team =

American college football season

1994 Florida State Seminoles football

ACC champion Sugar Bowl champion

Sugar Bowl, W 23–17 vs. Florida
- Conference: Atlantic Coast Conference

Ranking
- Coaches: No. 5
- AP: No. 4
- Record: 10–1–1 (8–0 ACC)
- Head coach: Bobby Bowden (19th season)
- Offensive coordinator: Mark Richt (1st season)
- Offensive scheme: Pro-style
- Defensive coordinator: Mickey Andrews (11th season)
- Base defense: 4–3
- Captains: Derrick Brooks; Zack Crockett; Kendrick Scott
- Home stadium: Doak Campbell Stadium

1994 Atlantic Coast Conference football standings
	Conf.					Overall
Team	W		L		T	W		L		T
No. 4 Florida State $	8	–	0	–	0	10	–	1	–	1
No. 17 NC State	6	–	2	–	0	9	–	3	–	0
No. 15 Virginia	5	–	3	–	0	9	–	3	–	0
Duke	5	–	3	–	0	8	–	4	–	0
North Carolina	5	–	3	–	0	8	–	4	–	0
Clemson	4	–	4	–	0	5	–	6	–	0
Maryland	2	–	6	–	0	4	–	7	–	0
Wake Forest	1	–	7	–	0	3	–	8	–	0
Georgia Tech	0	–	8	–	0	1	–	10	–	0
$ – Conference champion; Rankings from AP Poll

The 1994 Florida State Seminoles football team represented Florida State University as a member of the Atlantic Coast Conference (ACC) during the 1994 NCAA Division I-A football season. Led by 19th-year head coach Bobby Bowden, the Seminoles compiled an overall record of 10–1–1 with a mark of 8–0 in conference play, winning the ACC title for the third consecutive season. Florida State was invited to the Sugar Bowl, where the Seminoles defeated Florida. The team played home games at Doak Campbell Stadium in Tallahassee, Florida

== Schedule ==
Date	Time	Opponent	Rank	Site	TV	Result	Attendance	Source
September 3	3:30 p.m.	Virginia	No. 4	Doak Campbell Stadium; Tallahassee, FL (Jefferson–Eppes Trophy)	ABC	W 41–17	74,551	
September 10	12:00 p.m.	at Maryland	No. 4	Byrd Stadium; College Park, MD	JPS	W 52–20	38,014	
September 17	6:30 p.m.	at Wake Forest	No. 3	Groves Stadium; Winston-Salem, NC		W 56–14	20,317	
September 24	7:30 p.m.	No. 13 North Carolina	No. 3	Doak Campbell Stadium; Tallahassee, FL	ESPN	W 31–18	78,111	
October 8	7:30 p.m.	at No. 13 Miami (FL)*	No. 3	Miami Orange Bowl; Miami, FL (rivalry, College GameDay)	ESPN	L 20–34	77,010	
October 22	12:00 p.m.	Clemson^{†}	No. 10	Doak Campbell Stadium; Tallahassee, FL (rivalry)	JPS	W 17–0	75,902	
October 29	12:00 p.m.	No. 16 Duke	No. 9	Doak Campbell Stadium; Tallahassee, FL	JPS	W 59–20	73,899	
November 5	12:00 p.m.	at Georgia Tech	No. 8	Bobby Dodd Stadium; Atlanta, GA	JPS	W 41–10	45,206	
November 12	12:00 p.m.	vs. Notre Dame*	No. 8	Florida Citrus Bowl; Orlando, FL (rivalry)	ABC	W 23–16	72,868	
November 19	7:30 p.m.	at No. 25 NC State	No. 8	Carter–Finley Stadium; Raleigh, NC	ESPN	W 34–3	52,400	
November 26	12:00 p.m.	No. 4 Florida*	No. 7	Doak Campbell Stadium; Tallahassee, FL (rivalry)	ABC	T 31–31	80,210	
January 2	8:30 p.m.	vs. No. 5 Florida*	No. 7	Louisiana Superdome; New Orleans, LA (Sugar Bowl)	ABC	W 23–17	76,224	
*Non-conference game; ^{†}Homecoming; Rankings from AP Poll released prior to the game; All times are in Eastern time

== Rankings ==
Ranking movements Legend: ██ Increase in ranking ██ Decrease in ranking ( ) = First-place votes
	Week																
Poll	Pre	1	2	3	4	5	6	7	8	9	10	11	12	13	14	15	Final
AP	3 (10)	4 (8)	4 (8)	3 (5)	3 (3)	3 (4)	3 (4)	11	10	9	8	8	8	7	7	7	4
Coaches	2 (13)		3 (6)	4 (1)	3	3 (2)	3 (1)	8	7	7	6	6	6	6	7	7	5

== Game summaries ==
=== Florida ===
No. 4 Florida at No. 7 Florida State

Team	1	2	3	4	Total
Gators	7	17	7	0	31
Seminoles	3	0	0	28	31

- Date: November 26
- Location: Doak Campbell Stadium
- Game attendance: 80,210
- Television network: ABC

=== Florida—Sugar Bowl ===
No. 7 Florida State vs. No. 5 Florida

Team	1	2	3	4	Total
• Seminoles	3	17	3	0	23
Gators	3	7	0	7	17

- Date: January 2
- Location: Louisiana Superdome
- Game weather: Indoors (dome)
- TV announcers (ABC): Brent Musburger and Dick Vermeil

== Roster ==
1994 Florida State Seminoles football team roster
Players
Coaches
Offense

Pos.	#	Name	Class
QB	13	Danny Kanell	Jr
WR	15	Phillip Riley	Jr
C	53	Clay Shiver	Jr
WR	80	Tamarick Vanover	Jr

Defense

Pos.	#	Name	Class
CB	2	Clifton Abraham	Sr
DB	11	Devin Bush Sr.	Jr
LB	10	Derrick Brooks	Sr
CB	20	James Colzie	So
CB	4	Corey Fuller	Sr

Special teams

Pos.	#	Name	Class

Head coach

- Bobby Bowden

Coordinators/assistant coaches

Legend

- (C) Team captain
- (S) Suspended
- (I) Ineligible
- Injured
- Redshirt
