= 1994 Texas Tech Red Raiders football team =

American college football season

1994 Texas Tech Red Raiders football

SWC co-champion

Cotton Bowl Classic, L 14–55 vs. USC
- Conference: Southwest Conference
- Record: 6–6 (4–3 SWC)
- Head coach: Spike Dykes (8th season)
- Offensive coordinator: Dick Winder (8th season)
- Offensive scheme: No-huddle spread
- Base defense: 4–3
- Home stadium: Jones Stadium

1994 Southwest Conference football standings
	Conf.					Overall
Team	W		L		T	W		L		T
No. 8 Texas A&M *	6	–	0	–	1	10	–	0	–	1
No. 25 Texas +	4	–	3	–	0	8	–	4	–	0
Baylor +	4	–	3	–	0	7	–	5	–	0
TCU +	4	–	3	–	0	7	–	5	–	0
Texas Tech +	4	–	3	–	0	6	–	6	–	0
Rice +	4	–	3	–	0	5	–	6	–	0
Houston	1	–	6	–	0	1	–	10	–	0
SMU	0	–	6	–	1	1	–	9	–	1
+ – Conference co-champions; * – ineligible for championship and postseason due to NCAA sanctions; Rankings from AP Poll

The 1994 Texas Tech Red Raiders football team represented Texas Tech University as a member of the Southwest Conference (SWC) during the 1994 NCAA Division I-A football season. In their eighth season under head coach Spike Dykes, the Red Raiders compiled a 6–6 record (4–3 against SWC opponents) and finished in a five-way tie for second place in the conference. However, Texas A&M was on probation and ineligible for the conference championship or post-season play, which meant that the Red Raiders were awarded a share of the SWC championship. Per SWC rules, Texas Tech was selected to represent the conference in the 1995 Cotton Bowl Classic. The Red Raiders had not played in the bowl game since 1939, which was also their only other appearance in a major bowl game in their 69-year football history. More importantly, they had never done so since joining the SWC in 1960. Under conference rules, when two or more teams were tied for the conference title, the team with the longest Cotton Bowl drought received the bid. Tech outscored opponents by a combined total of 312 to 246. The team played its home games at Clifford B. and Audrey Jones Stadium in Lubbock, Texas.

== Schedule ==
Date	Time	Opponent	Site	TV	Result	Attendance
September 3	1:00 pm	New Mexico*	Jones Stadium; Lubbock, TX		W 37–31	27,234
September 8	7:00 pm	No. 1 Nebraska*	Jones Stadium; Lubbock, TX	ESPN	L 16–42	32,768
September 17	1:30 pm	at No. 21 Oklahoma*	Oklahoma Memorial Stadium; Norman, OK		L 11–17	62,323
September 24	2:00 pm	SMU^{†}	Jones Stadium; Lubbock, TX		W 35–7	29,521
October 1	1:00 pm	at No. 10 Texas A&M	Kyle Field; College Station, TX (rivalry)		L 17–23	64,242
October 8	12:00 pm	at Rice	Rice Stadium; Houston, TX	Raycom	L 21–24	16,900
October 22	1:00 pm	Baylor	Jones Stadium; Lubbock, TX (rivalry)		W 38–7	29,443
October 29	12:00 pm	No. 19 Texas	Jones Stadium; Lubbock, TX (rivalry)	Raycom	W 33–9	45,591
November 12	1:00 pm	Southwestern Louisiana*	Jones Stadium; Lubbock, TX		W 39–7	27,636
November 19	12:00 pm	vs. Houston	Alamodome; San Antonio, TX (rivalry)	Raycom	W 34–0	20,286
November 25	12:00 pm	at TCU	Amon G. Carter Stadium; Fort Worth, TX (rivalry)	ABC	L 17–24	43,219
January 2	12:00 pm	vs. No. 21 USC*	Cotton Bowl; Dallas, TX (Cotton Bowl Classic)	NBC	L 14–55	70,218
*Non-conference game; ^{†}Homecoming; Rankings from AP Poll released prior to the game; All times are in Central time

== Roster ==
1994 Texas Tech Red Raiders football team roster
Players			Coaches
Offense: Pos. / # / Name / Class	Defense: Pos. / # / Name / Class; LB / 35 / Zach Thomas	Special teams: Pos. / # / Name / Class	Head coach: Spike Dykes; Coordinators/assistant coaches Legend: (C) Team captain; (S) Suspended; (I) Ineligible; Injured; Redshirt

== Game summaries ==
=== Nebraska ===
Nebraska at Texas Tech

Team	1	2	3	4	Total
• No. 1 Cornhuskers	7	7	14	14	42
Red Raiders	0	3	6	7	16

- Date: September 8
- Location: Clifford B. and Audrey Jones Stadium, Lubbock, Texas
- Game attendance: 32,768

=== USC (Cotton Bowl Classic) ===
USC vs. Texas Tech

Team	1	2	3	4	Total
• No. 21 Trojans	28	6	14	7	55
Red Raiders	0	0	7	7	14

- Date: January 2
- Location: Cotton Bowl
- Game attendance: 70,218
- Television network: NBC

Scoring summary
Q1	6:51	USC	Shawn Walters 11-yard touchdown run (Ford kick)	USC 7–0
Q1	6:39	USC	Terry Barnum 19-yard touchdown pass from Rob Johnson (Ford kick)	USC 14–0
Q1	5:35	USC	John Herpin 26-yard interception return (Ford kick)	USC 21–0
Q1	2:22	USC	Keyshawn Johnson 12-yard touchdown pass from R. Johnson (Ford kick)	USC 28–0
Q2	6:50	USC	Ford 39-yard field goal	USC 31–0
Q2	0:17	USC	Ford 42-yard field goal	USC 34–0
Q3	10:29	USC	Keyshawn Johnson 22-yard touchdown pass from R. Johnson (Ford kick)	USC 41–0
Q3	7:51	USC	Keyshawn Johnson 86-yard touchdown pass from Brad Otton (Ford kick)	USC 48–0
Q3	2:15	TTU	Zebbie Lethridge 5-yard touchdown run (Davis kick)	USC 48–7
Q4	2:40	USC	Jeff Diltz 2-yard touchdown pass from Brad Otton (Ford kick)	USC 55–7
Q4	0:00	TTU	Stacy Mitchell 45-yard touchdown pass from Sone Cavazos (Davis kick)	USC 55–14
