= Wild West Comedy Show: 30 Days and 30 Nights – Hollywood to the Heartland =

- Directed by: Ari Sandel
- Produced by: Peter Billingsley; John Isbell; John M. Pisani; Sandra J. Smith; Victoria Vaughn; Vince Vaughn
- Starring: Ahmed Ahmed; Sean Fitzgerald; Peter Billingsley; John Caparulo; Bret Ernst; Justin Long; Sebastian Maniscalco; Keir O'Donnell; Vince Vaughn
- Edited by: Jim Kelly; Dan Lebental
- Music by: John O'Brien
- Distributed by: Picturehouse
- Release dates: September 8, 2006 (tiff); February 8, 2008 (United States)
- Running time: 100 minutes
- Country: United States
- Language: English
- Box office: $603,894

Wild West Comedy Show: 30 Days and 30 Nights – Hollywood to the Heartland is a comedy documentary film directed by Ari Sandel that follows the 30-day comedy tour of several stand up comedians. It premiered September 8, 2006, at the Toronto International Film Festival. It opened in wide release in the United States on February 8, 2008.

== Synopsis ==
The documentary follows the month-long live comedy variety tour of Vince Vaughn and four stand-up comedians in the spirit of Wild West shows. Vaughn picked four comedians from The Comedy Store in Los Angeles (Ahmed Ahmed, John Caparulo, Bret Ernst and Sebastian Maniscalco) for the tour. The tour began September 12, 2005 in Hollywood at the Music Box Theater and spanned 30 shows over 30 consecutive nights in 30 cities across the United States. Vince Vaughn acts as emcee and performs improv sketches with surprise guests. The comedians traveled over 6,000 miles on their tour and included stops in the Western, Southern, and Midwestern states. The film highlights their performances on-stage and contains interviews with the various comedians.

== Cast ==
- Ahmed Ahmed
- Peter Billingsley
- John Caparulo
- Jon Favreau
- Justin Long
- Sebastian Maniscalco
- Keir O'Donnell
- Vince Vaughn

== Production ==
Vince Vaughn produced the film, along with his friend Peter Billingsley. The two had met in 1990 while making an episode of CBS Schoolbreak Special. Vaughn's older sister Victoria was also a producer. Chris Henkel, Paul Ruffolo, Dave Rutherford, and Jani Zandovskis served as camera operators. The show director was Chad Horning. The stage manager was Jason Ruffolo. The tour included an unscheduled matinee, with proceeds going to the Salvation Army for victims of Hurricane Katrina.

== Critical reception ==
The film received mixed reviews from critics. As of June 2020, the film holds a 59% approval rating on the review aggregator Rotten Tomatoes, based on 88 reviews with an average rating of 6.03/10, with the consensus that the film "has some entertaining moments, but is a mostly hit-and-miss documentary." Metacritic reported the film had an average score of 51 out of 100, based on 24 reviews.

Peter Hartlaub of the San Francisco Chronicle wrote "It's a funny comedy, and sometimes an even better drama" and called it a "nice companion piece" to the 2002 film Comedian. Hartlaub said "The comics all have their good and bad moments, but John Caparulo is arguably the most hilarious both on- and offstage" and "the movie is best when Vaughn plays off his own pop culture stature." Hartlaub also wrote that "director Ari Sandel paces the film well."

Stephen Holden of The New York Times described the film as "more of a backstage documentary" than a concert film. Holden wrote the film "includes some moderately funny snippets of actual performances" but "we never see a complete performance or even a quarter of one." Holden called it "among the tamest tours ever filmed." Holden wrote that the tour was re-routed because it came after Hurricane Katrina hit the Gulf Coast. Holden wrote "In the most revealing scene Mr. Vaughn and his crew visit an Alabama trailer camp to give free tickets to the residents, many of them New Orleans evacuees who lost everything."

== Box office ==
The film opened in wide release in the United States on February 8, 2008, and grossed $464,170 in 962 theaters that weekend, averaging $483 per theater. The film grossed a total of $603,894 after three weeks in theaters. It has often been considered a box office bomb.
