= Sebastian Maniscalco =

American stand-up comedian and actor

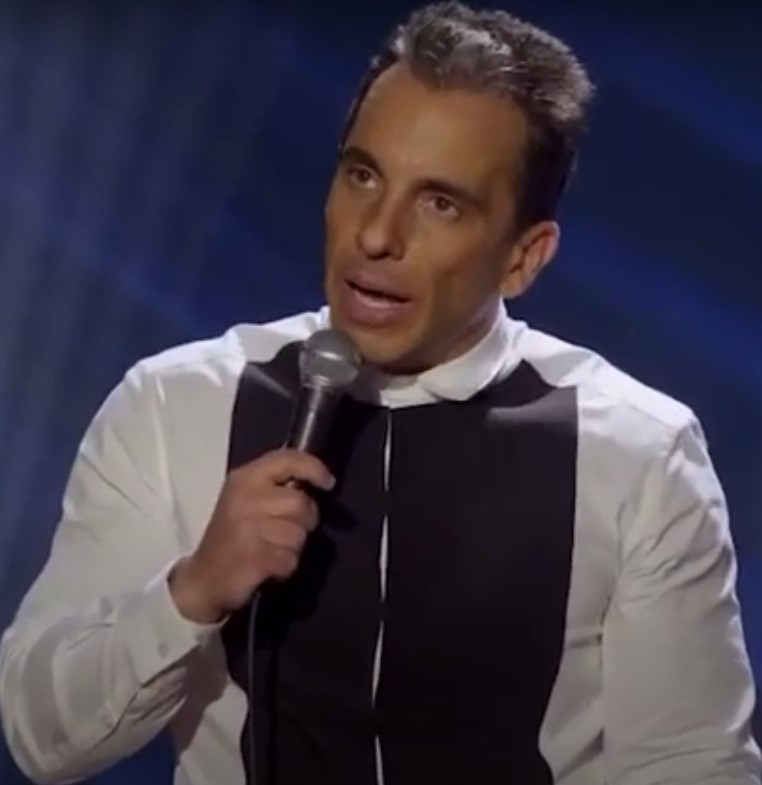
- Maniscalco in 2018
- Born: July 8, 1973 (age 53); Arlington Heights, Illinois, U.S.
- Education: Northern Illinois University
- Occupations: Stand-up comedian; actor
- Spouse: Lana Gomez (m. 2013)
- Children: 2

Comedy career
- Years active: 1998–present
- Medium: Stand-up comedy; television; film; radio; books
- Genres: Satire; observational comedy; black comedy; insult comedy
- Subjects: Italian-American culture; marriage; everyday life; pop culture
- Website: sebastianlive.com

Sebastian Maniscalco (/mænɪˈskælkoʊ/; Italian: [manisˈkalko]; born July 8, 1973) is an American stand-up comedian and actor. Best known for his stand-up comedy, Maniscalco has released seven comedy specials. He has also had supporting acting roles in the films Green Book (2018) and The Irishman (2019), playing mobster Joe Gallo in the latter. He also played Frank Russo in the 2022 film Somewhere in Queens, and later voice acted in The Nut Job 2: Nutty by Nature (2017), The Super Mario Bros. Movie (2023) and IF (2024). Maniscalco co-wrote and co-starred in the 2023 film About My Father, with Robert De Niro playing the role of his father. Maniscalco starred in the TV series Bookie.

== Early life ==
Maniscalco was born in the Chicago suburb of Arlington Heights, Illinois, to Italian immigrants on July 8, 1973; his father Salvatore Maniscalco, who worked as a hairstylist, immigrated to the United States with his family from Cefalù, Sicily, at the age of 15. His mother, Rose Maniscalco, was a secretary, and her family has origins in Naples, Campania and Sicily. Maniscalco is a Roman Catholic, and at eight years old, he was an altar boy at St. Cecilia Catholic Church in suburban Mount Prospect, Illinois. He is an alum of Rolling Meadows High School. He graduated from Northern Illinois University in 1995, where he was the president of the Sigma Pi fraternity chapter, with a degree in communication studies. After moving to Los Angeles in 1998, Maniscalco performed at open mics in bars and bowling alleys while working as a waiter at the Four Seasons Hotel in Beverly Hills, California, where he worked from 1998 to 2005.

== Career ==
In 2005, he began performing regularly at The Comedy Store in West Hollywood, California. Maniscalco cites Jerry Seinfeld, George Carlin, Brian Regan, John Ritter, Johnny Carson, Andrew Dice Clay, Bill Burr, and Don Rickles as comedic influences. Since then, he has done a half-hour for Comedy Central Presents and five hour-long specials. His first special, Sebastian Live, was released on June 2, 2009. His next three specials were aired on Showtime, with What's Wrong with People? released on January 5, 2012, Aren't You Embarrassed?, taped in Chicago, released on November 14, 2014, and Why Would You Do That?, taped in New York City and released in 2016.

Maniscalco was one of four comedians featured in Vince Vaughn's Wild West Comedy Show: 30 Days & 30 Nights – Hollywood to the Heartland, along with Ahmed Ahmed, John Caparulo, and Bret Ernst. Maniscalco has been on Russell Peters' Best Night Ever, Comedy Central Presents, The Late Late Show with Craig Ferguson, The Tonight Show with Jay Leno, The Jay Leno Show, The Tonight Show Starring Jimmy Fallon, Conan, and The Late Show with Stephen Colbert. Additionally, he appeared in several films, such as The Nut Job 2: Nutty by Nature, The House, Tag, and Cruise, and he co-hosts a podcast titled The Pete and Sebastian Show with fellow comedian Pete Correale. As of January 2017, they have a show on Sirius XM satellite radio's Raw Dog Comedy channel 99. Maniscalco appeared on the seventh season of Comedians in Cars Getting Coffee in 2016 and returned to the series in 2019 for its eleventh season. He published his memoir Stay Hungry on February 27, 2018. A Netflix special also titled Stay Hungry was released on January 15, 2019.

In 2017, Maniscalco made his feature film debut in The House, and the following year he appeared as Johnny Venere in the Academy Award-winning film Green Book. Maniscalco hosted the 2019 MTV Video Music Awards on August 26. In November 2019, Maniscalco appeared in Martin Scorsese's The Irishman playing "Crazy" Joe Gallo alongside Robert De Niro, Joe Pesci, and Al Pacino. He also hosted the three-part companion podcast for the film, first published on December 2, 2019, titled Behind the Irishman.

In June 2021, it was announced that Maniscalco will host a reality television show titled Well Done With Sebastian Maniscalco that premiered on August 12, 2021, on Discovery+ where he will be joined by friends and family to explore food culture and etiquette. Four days after the premiere, the show was renewed for a six-episode second season that premiered on November 16, 2021. In August 2021, during a podcast, he announced that he was a part of the cast of Illumination's The Super Mario Bros. Movie, playing the role of Spike from the game Wrecking Crew as Mario and Luigi's boss.

Maniscalco's 5th comedy special, Is It Me?, was released on December 6, 2022, on Netflix. On May 26, 2023, About My Father was released in theaters, a comedy film Maniscalco co-wrote loosely based on his life and in which he co-starred with Robert De Niro, who played the role of his father. Maniscalco starred for two seasons in the television series Bookie, which debuted on November 30, 2023.

On April 23, 2025, it was announced that Maniscalco would appear in an Apple's first ever scripted podcast, titled Easy Money: The Charles Ponzi Story. Maniscalco will voice Charles Ponzi and the podcast is said to discuss the rise and fall of Ponzi as well as his schemes. The podcast will be hosted by Maya Lau.

In September 2025, Maniscalco participated in the Riyadh Comedy Festival. Joey Shea, Saudi Arabia researcher at Human Rights Watch, said in a statement that the Saudi government is using the comedy festival to whitewash its human rights abuses.

In 2026, SiriusXM launched Sebastian Maniscalco's Comedy Radio, taking over channel 99. A new show, The Sebastian Maniscaclo Show, will replace the previous The Pete and Sebastian Show.

== Comedic style ==
He is known for his "nostalgia" type of humor grounded in personal family experiences and delivered utilizing heavy physical and verbal variations. Most of his material riffs on being raised in an old-school environment with an immigrant father, or just expressing his amazement at people's outlandish behavior. Maniscalco says that comedy cannot be learned, it must be earned. It took him nearly 20 years to develop his "Can you believe this?" style of humor. He explained, "you don't become a bodybuilder the first day you start lifting weights. Same thing with comedy. You gotta flesh out your joke, your bit. You add and subtract. You see what works."

== SiriusXM channel ==
Sebastian Maniscalco drew criticism from numerous comedians following the SiriusXM rebrand of its Raw Comedy channel into Sebastian Maniscalco's Comedy Radio, who argued that the format change favored top-tier comedians over lesser-known comedians. This would lead to reducing airplay and residual royalties for lesser-known comics.

Comedian Liz Miele addressed the shift by stating that the channel had moved from featuring hundreds of "working-class comics" to a smaller roster of "marquee names", which impacts essential income for road acts. Other performers, including Patton Oswalt, Matt Ruby and Margaret Cho, also highlighted the financial and exposure toll on non-headlining acts. SiriusXM defended the programming update by stating that the decision to end Raw Comedy stemmed from prior underperformance.

== Personal life ==
Maniscalco graduated from Northern Illinois University in 1995. He was a member of the Sigma Pi fraternity and served as chapter president his senior year.

Maniscalco married Lana Gomez in August 2013. The couple have two children together: a daughter born in 2017, and a son born in 2019.

== Filmography ==
Key
†	Denotes films that have not yet been released

=== Comedy specials ===
Year	Title	Formats	Studio
2009	Sebastian Live		
2012	What's Wrong with People?	DVD/Streaming	Entertainment One
2014	Aren't You Embarrassed?	Streaming	Levity Productions
2016	Why Would You Do That?	Streaming	Levity Productions
2019	Stay Hungry	Streaming	Netflix
2022	Is It Me?	Streaming	Netflix
2025	It Ain’t Right	Streaming	Hulu

=== Film ===
Year	Title	Role	Notes
2017	The House	Stand-Up Comic	
2017	The Nut Job 2: Nutty by Nature	Johnny	Voice
2018	Cruise	Dinardo	
2018	Tag	Pastor	
2018	Green Book	Johnny Venere	
2019	The Irishman	"Crazy" Joe Gallo	
2022	Somewhere in Queens	Frank Russo	
2023	Spinning Gold	Giorgio Moroder	
2023	The Super Mario Bros. Movie	Foreman Spike	Voice
2023	About My Father	Himself	Also writer
2024	Unfrosted	Chester Slink	
2024	IF	Magician Mouse	Voice

=== Television ===
Year	Title	Role	Notes
2004	Complete Savages	Dance Club Manager	Episode: "Almost Men in Uniform"
2020	The Comedy Store	Himself	
2021	Well Done with Sebastian Maniscalco	Himself	13 episodes
2023–2025	Bookie	Danny Colavito	Also executive producer
2024	Who Wants to Be a Millionaire	Himself	U.S. version; season 3, episode 2
