= 1994 Pittsburgh Panthers football team =

American college football season

1994 Pittsburgh Panthers football
- Conference: Big East Conference
- Record: 3–8 (2–5 Big East)
- Head coach: Johnny Majors (6th season)
- Offensive coordinator: Ken Karcher (2nd season)
- Offensive scheme: Multiple
- Defensive coordinator: Chuck Driesbach (2nd season)
- Base defense: Multiple 4–3
- Home stadium: Pitt Stadium

1994 Big East Conference football standings
| | Conf. | | | | | Overall |
| Team | W | | L | | T | W | | L | | T |
|---|---|---|---|---|---|---|---|---|---|---|
| No. 6 Miami (FL) $ | 7 | – | 0 | – | 0 | 10 | – | 2 | – | 0 |
| Virginia Tech | 5 | – | 2 | – | 0 | 8 | – | 4 | – | 0 |
| Syracuse | 4 | – | 3 | – | 0 | 7 | – | 4 | – | 0 |
| West Virginia | 4 | – | 3 | – | 0 | 7 | – | 6 | – | 0 |
| No. 23 Boston College | 3 | – | 3 | – | 1 | 7 | – | 4 | – | 1 |
| Rutgers | 2 | – | 4 | – | 1 | 5 | – | 5 | – | 1 |
| Pittsburgh | 2 | – | 5 | – | 0 | 3 | – | 8 | – | 0 |
| Temple | 0 | – | 7 | – | 0 | 2 | – | 9 | – | 0 |
$ – Conference champion; Rankings from AP Poll

The 1994 Pittsburgh Panthers football team represented the University of Pittsburgh in the 1994 NCAA Division I-A football season.

== Schedule ==
| Date | Time | Opponent | Site | TV | Result | Attendance | Source |
|---|---|---|---|---|---|---|---|
| September 3 | 12:00 p.m. | Texas* | Pitt Stadium; Pittsburgh, PA | Raycom | L 28–30 | 32,337 | |
| September 10 | 7:00 p.m. | Ohio* | Pitt Stadium; Pittsburgh, PA | | W 30–16 | 33,194 | |
| September 17 | 12:30 p.m. | at Ohio State* | Ohio Stadium; Columbus, OH | ESPN | L 3–27 | 93,454 | |
| September 24 | 12:00 p.m. | Boston College | Pitt Stadium; Pittsburgh, PA | Big East | L 9–21 | 34,623 | |
| October 1 | 4:00 p.m. | at Louisville* | Cardinal Stadium; Louisville, KY | | L 29–33 | 38,621 | |
| October 8 | 12:00 p.m. | at Syracuse | Carrier Dome; Syracuse, NY (rivalry) | Big East | L 7–31 | 47,622 | |
| October 15 | 12:00 p.m. | West Virginia | Pitt Stadium; Pittsburgh, PA (Backyard Brawl) | Big East | L 41–47 | 38,293 | |
| October 22 | 12:00 p.m. | at Virginia Tech | Lane Stadium; Blacksburg, VA | Big East | L 7–45 | 48,462 | |
| October 29 | 12:00 p.m. | Temple | Pitt Stadium; Pittsburgh, PA | Big East | W 45–19 | 22,483 | |
| November 12 | 4:00 p.m. | at Miami (FL) | Miami Orange Bowl; Miami, FL | | L 12–17 | 50,058 | |
| November 19 | 1:30 p.m. | Rutgers | Pitt Stadium; Pittsburgh, PA | | W 35–21 | 28,463 | |
*Non-conference game; All times are in Eastern time

== Personnel ==
=== Coaching staff ===
1994 Pittsburgh Panthers football staff
| Coaching staff: Johnny Majors – Head coach; Charlie Coe – Assistant head coach/running backs; Bob Babich – Linebackers; Steve Bird – Receivers/kickers; Curt Cignetti – Tight ends/recruiting coordinator; Chuck Driesbach – Defensive coordinator; Jack Henry – Offensive line; Ken Karcher – Offensive coordinator/quarterbacks; Tim Lewis – Defensive backs; Tom Turchetta – Defensive line | Support staff: Alex Kramer – Administrative assistant; Marc Hudak – Graduate assistant | Strength and conditioning staff: Tim Wilson – Strength and conditioning Coach; Jim Schmus – Assistant Strength and Conditioning Coach |

=== Roster ===
1994 Pittsburgh Panthers football team roster
Players
Coaches
Offense

| Pos. | # | Name | Class |
|---|---|---|---|
| G | 78 | Ruben Brown | Sr |
| WR | 49 | Billy Davis | Sr |
| WR | 26 | Dietrich Jells | Jr |
| QB | 8 | Matt Lytle | Fr |
| RB | 29 | Curtis Martin | Sr |
| QB | 14 | John Ryan | Jr |
| QB | 7 | Sean Fitzgerald | Jr |

Defense

| Pos. | # | Name | Class |
|---|---|---|---|
| DT | 90 | Tom Barndt | Sr |
| DB | 12 | Anthony Dorsett | Jr |
| DL | 98 | Mike Mohring | So |
| LB | 84 | Tom Tumulty | Jr |

Special teams

| Pos. | # | Name | Class |

Head coach

- Johnny Majors

Coordinators/assistant coaches

- Andy Rondeau
  (Graduate assistant)

Legend

- (C) Team captain
- (S) Suspended
- (I) Ineligible
- Injured
- Redshirt

== Team players drafted into the NFL ==
| Player | Position | Round | Pick | NFL club |
| Ruben Brown | Guard | 1 | 14 | Buffalo Bills |
| Curtis Martin | Running back | 3 | 74 | New England Patriots |
| Tom Barndt | Defensive tackle | 6 | 207 | Kansas City Chiefs |
