= 1994 Boston College Eagles football team =

American college football season

1994 Boston College Eagles football

Aloha Bowl champion

Aloha Bowl, W 12–7 vs. Kansas State
- Conference: Big East Conference

Ranking
- Coaches: No. 22
- AP: No. 23
- Record: 7–4–1 (3–3–1 Big East)
- Head coach: Dan Henning (1st season)
- Offensive coordinator: Dirk Koetter (1st season)
- Offensive scheme: Pro-style
- Defensive coordinator: Jim Reid (1st season)
- Base defense: 4–3
- Captains: Stephen Boyd; Pete Mitchell; Michael Reed; Eric Shorter
- Home stadium: Alumni Stadium

1994 Big East Conference football standings
	Conf.					Overall
Team	W		L		T	W		L		T
No. 6 Miami (FL) $	7	–	0	–	0	10	–	2	–	0
Virginia Tech	5	–	2	–	0	8	–	4	–	0
Syracuse	4	–	3	–	0	7	–	4	–	0
West Virginia	4	–	3	–	0	7	–	6	–	0
No. 23 Boston College	3	–	3	–	1	7	–	4	–	1
Rutgers	2	–	4	–	1	5	–	5	–	1
Pittsburgh	2	–	5	–	0	3	–	8	–	0
Temple	0	–	7	–	0	2	–	9	–	0
$ – Conference champion; Rankings from AP Poll

The 1994 Boston College Eagles football team represented Boston College in the 1994 NCAA Division I-A football season. The Eagles were led by first-year head coach Dan Henning and played their home games at Alumni Stadium in Chestnut Hill, Massachusetts. They competed as members of the Big East Conference, finishing fifth with a conference record of 3–3–1. Boston College was invited to the 1994 Aloha Bowl, where they defeated then-No. 11 Kansas State, 12–7. They finished the season ranked 23rd in the AP Poll and 22nd in the Coaches' Poll.

== Schedule ==
Date	Opponent	Rank	Site	Result	Attendance	Source
September 3	at No. 5 Michigan*		Michigan Stadium; Ann Arbor, MI	L 26–34	105,936	
September 17	No. 18 Virginia Tech		Alumni Stadium; Chestnut Hill, MA (rivalry)	L 7–12	44,500	
September 24	at Pittsburgh		Pitt Stadium; Pittsburgh, PA	W 21–9	34,623	
October 8	No. 8 Notre Dame*		Alumni Stadium; Chestnut Hill, MA (Holy War)	W 30–11	44,500	
October 15	Temple	No. 24	Alumni Stadium; Chestnut Hill, MA	W 45–28	44,500	
October 22	Rutgers	No. 22	Alumni Stadium; Chestnut Hill, MA	T 7–7	44,500	
October 29	at Army*		Michie Stadium; West Point, NY	W 30–3	39,304	
November 3	at Louisville*		Cardinal Stadium; Louisville, KY	W 35–14	38,711	
November 12	No. 14 Syracuse	No. 25	Alumni Stadium; Chestnut Hill, MA	W 31–0	44,500	
November 19	at West Virginia	No. 17	Mountaineer Field; Morgantown, WV	L 20–21	44,890	
November 26	at No. 5 Miami (FL)	No. 25	Miami Orange Bowl; Miami, FL	L 7–23	60,579	
December 25	vs. No. 11 Kansas State*		Aloha Stadium; Halawa, HI (Aloha Bowl)	W 12–7	44,862	
*Non-conference game; Rankings from AP Poll released prior to the game

== Roster ==
1994 Boston College Eagles football team roster
Players
Coaches
Offense

Pos.	#	Name	Class
RB	30	David Green	Sr
QB	10	Mark Hartsell	Jr
QB	7	Matt Hasselbeck	Fr
G	66	Pete Kendall	Jr
TE	88	Gordon Laro	Sr
TE	82	Pete Mitchell	Sr

Defense

Pos.	#	Name	Class
LB	50	Stephen Boyd	Sr
DE	59	Mike Mamula	Jr
DB	17	Michael Reed	Sr

Special teams

Pos.	#	Name	Class

Head coach

- Dan Henning

Coordinators/assistant coaches

Legend

- (C) Team captain
- (S) Suspended
- (I) Ineligible
- Injured
- Redshirt

== Team players in the NFL ==
Player	Position	Round	Pick	NFL club
Mike Mamula	Defensive end	1	7	Philadelphia Eagles
Pete Mitchell	Tight end	4	122	Miami Dolphins
Stephen Boyd	Linebacker	5	141	Detroit Lions
Michael Reed	Defensive back	7	249	Carolina Panthers
