= About My Father =

2023 film by Laura Terruso

- Theatrical release poster
- Directed by: Laura Terruso
- Written by: Sebastian Maniscalco; Austen Earl
- Produced by: Chris Weitz; Paul Weitz; Andrew Miano; Judi Marmel
- Starring: Sebastian Maniscalco; Robert De Niro; Leslie Bibb; Anders Holm; David Rasche; Kim Cattrall
- Cinematography: Rogier Stoffers
- Edited by: Scott D. Hanson
- Music by: Stephanie Economou
- Production company: Depth of Field
- Distributed by: Lionsgate Films
- Release date: May 26, 2023
- Running time: 89 minutes
- Country: United States
- Language: English
- Budget: $30 million
- Box office: $18.2 million

About My Father is a 2023 American comedy film directed by Laura Terruso from a screenplay by Sebastian Maniscalco and Austen Earl. The film stars Maniscalco and is loosely based on his life and his relationship with his father, played by Robert De Niro. Leslie Bibb, Anders Holm, David Rasche, and Kim Cattrall co-star in supporting roles.

The film was released by Lionsgate on May 26, 2023. It grossed $18.2 million and received generally negative reviews from critics.

== Plot ==
Sebastian Maniscalco, a hotel manager in Chicago, lives with his girlfriend Ellie Collins, a successful modern artist. When Ellie invites Sebastian to her family's Virginia estate for Independence Day weekend, he sees it as the perfect opportunity to propose and asks his father Salvo, a respected Sicilian-American hairstylist, for his late grandmother's wedding ring. Salvo agrees on the condition that he meet Ellie's parents first. Sebastian is reluctant, knowing the vast cultural and economic differences between his working-class immigrant family and the old money Collins family.

When Salvo learns Sebastian would otherwise celebrate the holiday alone, Ellie suggests he join them, and Salvo accepts despite Sebastian's reservations. The Collins family (including Ellie's father Bill, her mother Senator Tigger Collins, and her two younger brothers Lucky and Doug) welcome them to White Oak, their expansive country club estate complete with golf course, tennis courts, and a family of peacocks that serve as the club's mascots.

Cultural clashes arise immediately as Salvo misinterprets the family's displays of wealth, including expensive artwork and historical furniture, while the Collinses struggle to understand Salvo's perspective. At an on-site luxury restaurant, Salvo insists on paying for his meal despite Bill's tab covering everything. During a tennis match, Sebastian reveals he has been taking lessons to impress Ellie, which disappoints Salvo. Later, on the family yacht, the Collinses offer Sebastian a prestigious position at their Barrymore Hotel in Washington, D.C., and Sebastian accidentally exposes himself while flyboarding, that Lucky calls "jet-booting".

Tensions escalate when Salvo, feeling humiliated and out of place, decides to return home. Sebastian confronts him, arguing that Salvo's negativity prevents him from enjoying life and projects onto Sebastian. Salvo is hurt to learn Sebastian is considering the job offer and moving away so soon after his mother's death. Sebastian responds that Salvo must make an effort to engage with the Collins family if he wants to remain part of their lives. Following a meditation session with Doug, Salvo overcomes his resistance.

The next day, Salvo enthusiastically participates in family activities, which concerns Sebastian, who fears his father is losing himself trying to fit in. When Senator Collins asks Salvo to style her hair before a television appearance, he gives her an intuitive pixie cut that initially shocks and angers her but later increases her popularity. To make amends, Salvo offers to prepare an Italian dinner for the family.

The dinner is a success until Sebastian discovers peacock feathers in the trash and realizes Salvo has killed and cooked Sergeant Feathers, one of the beloved family peacocks, as a substitute for chicken. While they secretly bury the remains, they argue about "peasant mentality" and doing what is necessary to provide for family. Later that night, the confrontation reaches its breaking point when Sebastian accuses Salvo of sabotaging his relationship and calls him an embarrassment.

On the morning of July 4th, Salvo has already departed, leaving the wedding ring behind. Sebastian accepts the Collins' job offer and receives their blessing to marry Ellie. However, Ellie discovers her parents have been secretly purchasing her artwork and that Sebastian had found out but said nothing. Devastated that she was never allowed to achieve success on her own merit, she tells Sebastian she wishes she had a father like Salvo who taught him to be tough and resourceful, qualities she truly loves about him.

Sebastian has an epiphany and rushes to the airport via Lucky's helicopter, overcoming his fear of flying. He catches Salvo before his flight and apologizes, acknowledging that while his father is stubborn, cheap, and judgmental, these qualities are part of what made him a great father. Sebastian realizes he has changed and forgotten his roots, while Salvo has remained true to himself. Salvo admits he has been acting erratically because he fears losing his only family once Sebastian marries into wealth. They reconcile, with Sebastian assuring Salvo he will always be part of his life.

They return in time for the evening clambake, where Sebastian successfully proposes to Ellie. After they watch the fireworks together, the family gathers for their Christmas card photo with Salvo included. Duke, the family dog, appears with peacock feathers in his mouth, allowing Sebastian and Salvo to deflect blame for the missing peacock onto the pet.

== Cast ==
- Robert De Niro as Salvo Maniscalco
- Sebastian Maniscalco as a fictionalized version of himself
- Leslie Bibb as Ellie
- Kim Cattrall as Tigger
- David Rasche as Bill
- Anders Holm as Lucky
- Brett Dier as Doug

== Production ==
On April 26, 2018, it was announced that Sebastian Maniscalco was set to star in an untitled film for Lionsgate, inspired by his life, with Austen Earl attached to co-write the screenplay alongside Maniscalco. There were no further developments until May 12, 2021, when it was announced that Laura Terruso was set to direct the film and Robert De Niro was cast in a lead role. De Niro actually met Maniscalco's father, for research on playing him. American Pie's Chris and Paul Weitz were attached to produce the film alongside Andrew Miano for their production company Depth of Field. In September 2021, Leslie Bibb and Kim Cattrall joined the lead cast. In November 2021, Brett Dier, Anders Holm, and David Rasche joined the cast. The film was co-financed by Media Capital Technologies.

Principal photography began on September 21, 2021, in Mobile, Alabama, and lasted for one month.

== Release ==
The film was released by Lionsgate on May 26, 2023.

About My Father was released for digital platforms on June 16, 2023, followed by a Blu-ray and DVD release on August 1, 2023.

== Reception ==
=== Box office ===
About My Father grossed $12.1 million in the United States and Canada, and $6.1 million in other territories, for a worldwide gross of $18.2 million.

In the United States and Canada, About My Father was released alongside The Little Mermaid, Kandahar, The Machine, and You Hurt My Feelings, was projected to gross $5–6 million from 2,400 theaters over its four-day Memorial Day opening weekend. The film made $1.5 million on its first day, including $285,000 from Thursday night previews. It went on to debut to $4.3 million (and $5.4 million over the four-day frame), finishing sixth. In its second weekend, the film declined 52% to $2.1 million, finishing in seventh place.

=== Critical response ===
On the review aggregator website Rotten Tomatoes, 36% of 86 critics' reviews are positive, with an average rating of 4.9/10. The website's consensus reads: "About My Father finds star/co-writer Sebastian Maniscalco drawing on his own life for material -- and inadvertently proving that a funny standup routine doesn't necessarily make for an entertaining film." Metacritic, which uses a weighted average, assigned the film a score of 39 out of 100, based on 19 critics, indicating "generally unfavorable" reviews. Audiences surveyed by CinemaScore gave the film an average grade of "B+" on an A+ to F scale, while those polled by PostTrak gave it an overall 80% positive score, with 51% saying they would definitely recommend it.

Matt Zoller Seitz, in a review for RogerEbert.com stated: "De Niro, bless his heart, is the engine that keeps this refurbished jalopy puttering along for 90 minutes. There are a couple of scenes that suggest the stronger, more fascinating movie that might've been". InSession Film's M.N. Miller called Maniscalco's film "A culture clash farce that works because of Maniscalco's style of comedy and De Niro playing to his long-established comic strengths as a cynical curmudgeon set in his ways."

=== Accolades ===
At the 44th Golden Raspberry Awards, the film was nominated for Worst Supporting Actress for Kim Cattrall.
