= Kiel Baltic Hurricanes =

American football team in Kiel, Germany

- Founded: 1988
- League: German Football League
- Based in: Kiel, Germany
- Stadium: Kilia Stadion
- Colors: Green, White and Orange
- Head coach: Timo Zorn
- Manager: Gunnar Peter
- Championships: German Bowl: 2010 EFL Bowl: 2014, 2015
- Website: baltic-hurricanes.de

The Kiel Baltic Hurricanes are an American football team based in Kiel, Germany.

The club has been a strong force in the sport in Germany, playing in five consecutive German Bowls from 2008 to 2012, losing the first two, winning the third, and losing the fourth and fifth.

The club is part of the American Sports Club Kiel e.V.

== History ==
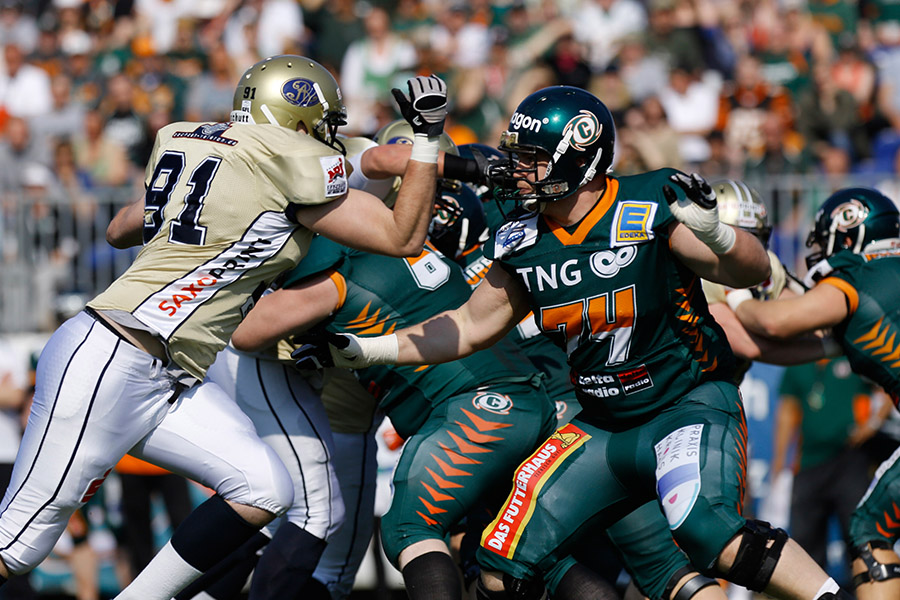
Hurricanes Offensive Tackle Nick Wieland against the Dresden Monarchs (credit: Stefan Stuhr)

Founded in 1988, the Kiel Baltic Hurricanes first took part in competitive football in 1989, when they entered the tier-four Landesliga Nord. The club reached the tier-two 2nd Bundesliga Nord by 1993. After back-to-back championships in this league, the Hurricanes played in the 1st Bundesliga Nord from 1996. This league would eventually become the German Football League. The Hurricanes reached the play-offs from 1997 to 2000, making it to the semi-finals once, in 1999, but were relegated in 2002. The 2002 relegation round against the Dresden Monarchs resulted in Kiel being shut out both at home and on the road by a combined score of 100-0. The second leg, Dresden's home game remains the best attended American football match ever played in Dresden. Dresden, the first team from former East Germany to reach the top tier in German American football, has remained a GFL1 member since and remains rivals with Kiel.

Restarting in the tier-three Regionalliga Nordost, the club quickly recovered, playing in the GFL once more from 2007 onwards, now with much greater success.

The club came third in its division in 2007 and was knocked-out in the play-off quarter finals, but managed to win its division the following year. The Hurricanes managed to reach their first German Bowl that season, but lost to the Braunschweig Lions, who made their last of twelve consecutive German Bowl appearances, ending an unprecedented run of the latter club. (To date no other club has managed more than 9 participations in total - a number achieved by the Düsseldorf Panthers and Schwäbisch Hall Unicorns)

Kiel came second in 2009, on equal points with the Berlin Adler. The two teams met in the German Bowl, but unlike 2008, when Kiel had defeated Berlin in the semi-finals, this time the club from the German capital triumphed. In 2010, Kiel once more topped its division and advanced to the German Bowl, once more against the Berlin Adler. This time, the Kiel Baltic Hurricanes proved the stronger and managed to win their first national German title. Their head coach during that time was NFL Europe alumn and former Hamburg Blue Devils player Patrick Esume.

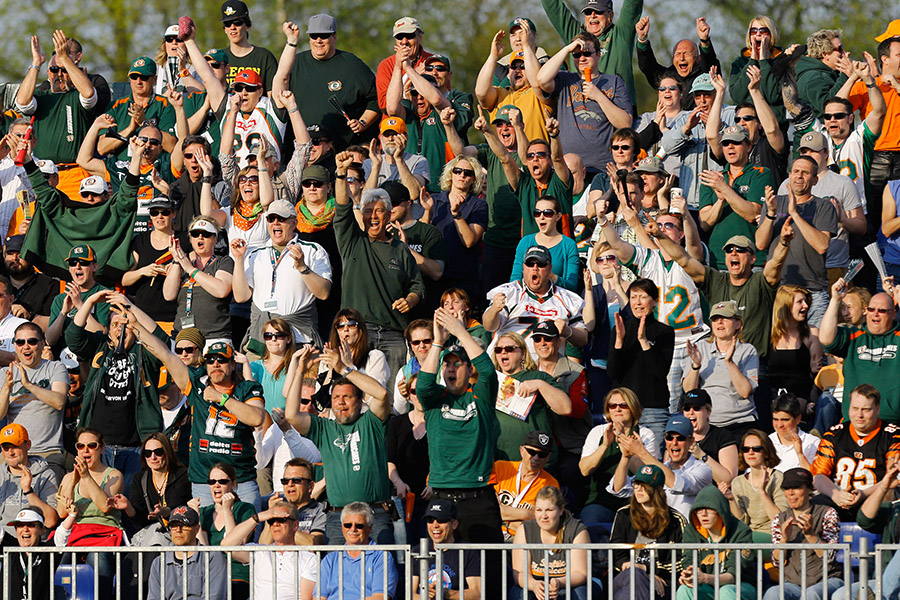
Hurricanes Fans cheer their team on in 2014 (credit: Stefan Stuhr)

Kiel won its division again in 2011, defeated the Munich Cowboys in the quarter-finals and the Düsseldorf Panther in the semi-finals of the play-offs and advanced to the German Bowl again where they met the Schwäbisch Hall Unicorns. The 33rd edition was the highest scoring German Bowl so far, ending with a 48–44 victory for the Unicorns, who thereby ended an 18-year title drought for the south. It was also the highest score achieved by any team losing a German Bowl at the time.

In 2012, the club once more won its division, only losing one game during the regular season away at Düsseldorf Panther, and reaching the German Bowl again against Schwäbisch Hall Unicorns, losing 53–56 in the championship game and topping the previous year's score. In 2013, the team came in on third place and was knocked out in the semi-finals of the playoffs by Braunschweig.

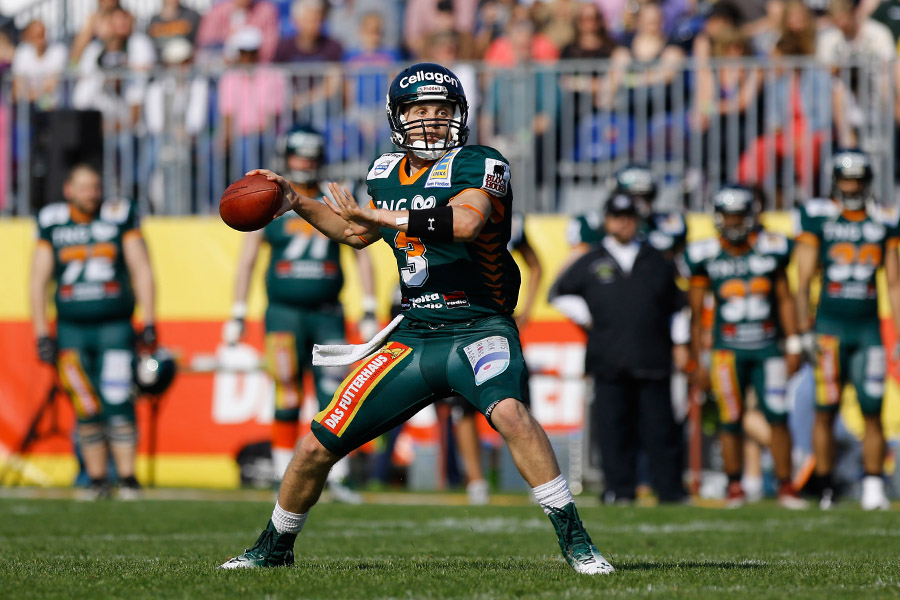
Hurricanes QB 2014 Nick Lamaison (credit: Stefan Stuhr)

The club participated in the 2014 European Football League and won the inaugural EFL Bowl when it defeated the Badalona Dracs 40–0 in the final. In the GFL the club came fourth in the northern division in 2014 but lost 24–50 to the Schwäbisch Hall Unicorns in the quarterfinals of the playoffs.

In 2015, the Kiel Baltic Hurricanes competed in the EFL tournament and defended their title in the final against the Allgäu Comets. The team finished third in the northern division of the GFL and lost to the Allgäu Comets in the quarter-finals of the playoffs.

Despite missing the EFL Bowl in 2016, the Hurricanes GFL season was more successful than the previous years'. The team again finished third in the northern division of the GFL, thus securing a playoff spot for the tenth year in a row. With a huge defensive effort the Canes won the first round (quarterfinal) against Frankfurt Universe 10–3 and advanced to the semifinal for the first time since 2013. Here, they lost 21–38 to the New Yorker Lions.

The 2017 season ended with a second place finish in the GFL North (behind Braunschweig but ahead of Dresden, who had placed ahead of them every previous season since 2013) but they again lost the semifinal to the eventual champion, this time the Schwäbisch Hall Unicorns.

In 2018 their fortunes waned and they failed to qualify for the playoffs, placing sixth with a losing 4-9-1 record.

2019 was an even worse year on the field as the team finished seventh, only two and a half games ahead of the Düsseldorf Panther who were relegated after a winless season. Their only wins on the season came against Düsseldorf and their sole draw was against the Potsdam Royals at home, who finished one spot ahead of them.

As the COVID-19 pandemic delayed and ultimately cancelled the 2020 season, it would be the 2021 which would show whether Kiel's on field product had much improved. While the 'canes won an upset victory at home against the New Yorker Lions and also defeated the Berlin Rebels on the Moorteichwiese, those were their only wins in a season they finished fifth out of six teams in the North with a record of 2-8-0 (The failed negotiations between the European League of Football and the Hildesheim Invaders as well as the Elmshorn Fighting Pirates led to those teams withdrawing without a replacement, thus the GFL North had only six instead of the "normal" eight teams that year).

== Honours ==
- EFL Bowl
  - Champions: 2014, 2015
- German Bowl
  - Champions: 2010
  - Runners-up: (4) 2008, 2009, 2011, 2012
- EFL
  - Participations: 2011, 2014
- GFL
  - Northern Division champions: (4) 2008, 2010, 2011, 2012
  - Play-off qualification: (16) 1997–2000, 2007–2017, 2025
  - League membership: (26) 1996–2002, 2007–present
- GFL2
  - Northern Division champions: 1994, 1995, 2005, 2006

== German Bowl appearances ==
The club's appearances in the German Bowl:

Bowl	Date	Champions	Runners-Up	Score	Location	Attendance
XXX	September 29, 2008	Braunschweig Lions	Kiel Baltic Hurricanes	20–14	Frankfurt	16,177
XXXI	October 3, 2009	Berlin Adler	Kiel Baltic Hurricanes	28–21	Frankfurt	14,234
XXXII	October 9, 2010	Kiel Baltic Hurricanes	Berlin Adler	17–10	Frankfurt	11,121
XXXIII	October 8, 2011	Schwäbisch Hall Unicorns	Kiel Baltic Hurricanes	48–44	Magdeburg	11,711
XXXIV	October 13, 2012	Schwäbisch Hall Unicorns	Kiel Baltic Hurricanes	56–53	Berlin	11,242

== Recent seasons ==
Recent seasons of the Kiel Baltic Hurricanes:

Year	Division	Finish	Points	Pct.	Games	W	D	L	PF	PA	Postseason
2005	GFL2 (North)	1st	24–4	0.857	14	12	0	2	372	162	Lost RR: Düsseldorf Panther (14–33 & 7–10)
2006	GFL2 (North)	1st	20–2	0.909	11	10	0	1	386	99	Won RR: Düsseldorf Panther (30–0 & 27–30)
2007	GFL (North)	3rd	15–9	0.625	12	7	1	4	256	159	Lost QF: Marburg Mercenaries (16–21)
2008	GFL (North)	1st	17–7	0.708	12	8	1	3	294	160	Won QF: Weinheim Longhorns (47–21) Won SF: Berlin Adler (17–12) Lost GB: Braunschweig Lions (14–20)
2009	GFL (North)	2nd	18–2	0.900	10	9	0	1	231	178	Won QF: Stuttgart Scorpions (20–6) Won SF: Schwäbisch Hall Unicorns (22–21) Lost GB: Berlin Adler (21–28)
2010	GFL (North)	1st	22–2	0.917	12	11	0	1	289	158	Won QF: Stuttgart Scorpions (23–21) Won SF: Dresden Monarchs (14–0) Won GB: Berlin Adler (17–10)
2011	GFL (North)	1st	24–4	0.857	14	12	0	2	444	224	Won QF: Munich Cowboys (45–6) Won SF: Düsseldorf Panther (45–21) Lost GB: Schwäbisch Hall Unicorns (44–48)
2012	GFL (North)	1st	26–2	0.929	14	13	0	1	593	272	Won QF: Stuttgart Scorpions (70–22) Won SF: Dresden Monarchs (35–14) Lost GB: Schwäbisch Hall Unicorns (53–56)
2013	GFL (North)	3rd	20–8	0.714	14	10	0	4	485	249	Won QF: Marburg Mercenaries (47–9) Lost SF: New Yorker Lions (29–34)
2014	GFL (North)	4th	14–10	0.583	12	7	0	5	330	280	Lost QF: Schwäbisch Hall Unicorns (24–50)
2015	GFL (North)	3rd	18–6	0.750	12	9	0	3	469	251	Lost QF: Allgäu Comets (27–39)
2016	GFL (North)	3rd	21–7	0.750	14	10	1	3	483	297	Won QF: Frankfurt Universe (10–3) Lost SF: New Yorker Lions (21–38)
2017	GFL (North)	2nd	20–8	0.714	14	10	0	4	531	323	Won QF: Marburg Mercenaries (28–14) Lost SF: Schwäbisch Hall Unicorns (11–33)
2018	GFL (North)	6th	9–19	0.321	14	4	1	9	297	394	—
2019	GFL (North)	7th	5–23	0.179	14	2	1	11	210	425	—
2020	GFL (North)	No season played because of the COVID-19 pandemic									
2021	GFL (North)	5th	4–16	0.200	10	2	0	8	217	429	—
2022	GFL (North)	7th	5–15	0.250	10	2	1	7	179	311	—
2023	GFL (North)	7th	2–22	0.083	12	1	(Note: Since the 2023 season the teams played overtimes until there was a winner)	11	259	446	—
2024	GFL (North)	6th	10–14	0.417	12	5	–	7	312	276	—
2025	GFL (North)	4th	14–10	0.583	12	7	–	5	354	327	Lost QF: Ravensburg Razorbacks (22–42)
2026	GFL (North)	6th	6–18	0.250	12	3	–	9	184	376	—

- RR = Relegation round.
- QF = Quarter finals.
- SF = Semi finals.
- GB = German Bowl.
