= German Football League 2 =

Second tier of American football in Germany

- Current season, competition or edition: 2026 German Football League
- Sport: American football
- Founded: 1982; 44 years ago
- Administrator: AFVD
- No. of teams: 16
- Country: Germany
- Most recent champion: North: Berlin Adler South: Straubing Spiders
- Level on pyramid: Level 2
- Related competitions: German Football League; Regionalliga
- Website: GFL.info

The German Football League 2 (GFL2) is the second tier of American football in Germany, below the German Football League. Until 2007, the league was known as the 2. Bundesliga.

== League structure ==
The GFL2, formerly the 2. Bundesliga, which was formed in 1982, is divided into a northern and southern division, with eight teams in each division. Unlike the GFL, there are no inter conference games and no GFL2 champion is determined.

For the 2011 season, both the northern and the southern champions were promoted, while the runners-up of the two divisions played the last placed team in the GFL division above for another spot in the league in 2012. Since then the two division champions play a home-and-away series for a place each in the northern and southern division of the GFL.

Below the GFL2, six Regionalligas, Regional Leagues, are set, North, South, West, Central, East and Southwest. Four teams each are promoted each season from the Regionalliga to the GFL2. However, additional spots may become available if teams resign from either the GFL or the GFL2.

Promotion to the GFL2 is achieved through a promotion round at the end of the Regionalliga season which includes the best Regionalliga teams. For the southern division of the GFL2 the champions of the southern, southwestern and central division and for the northern GFL2 division the champions of the Regionalliga divisions north, west and east play each other once to determine the two promoted teams.

== League history ==
The league was formed as the 2nd American Football Bundesliga in 1982, consisting of 16 clubs in three regional divisions. League strength varied from season to season after this, but the three division format was retained until 1986, when a fourth regional group was added.

In 1995, the league was reduced to two divisions with seven clubs each. The strength was increased to eight teams per division in 1998 but continued to fluctuate because of teams withdrawing.

Promotion to the GFL2 is achieved through the promotion round of the best Regionalliga clubs whereby the champions from the south plays the runners-up from central division and the champions from central the runners-up from the south. The winners of these two contests earn a place in the southern division of the GFL2 for the following season. In the north the champions Of the Regionalliga divisions North,

== GFL2 Teams in 2026 ==
Location of teams in the German Football League 2 in 2026

=== GFL2 North ===
Team	City	State
Elmshorn Fighting Pirates	Elmshorn	Schleswig-Holstein
Hamburg Pioneers	Hamburg	Hamburg
Krefeld Ravens	Krefeld	North Rhine-Westphalia
Langenfeld Longhorns	Langenfeld	North Rhine-Westphalia
Leipzig Lions	Leipzig	Saxony
Minden Wolves	Minden	North Rhine-Westphalia
Rostock Griffins	Rostock	Mecklenburg-Vorpommern

=== GFL2 South ===
Team	City	State
Albershausen Crusaders	Albershausen	Baden-Württemberg
Augsburg Centurions	Augsburg	Bavaria
Biberach Beavers	Biberach	Baden-Württemberg
Gießen Golden Dragons	Gießen	Hesse
Montabaur Fighting Farmers	Montabaur	Rhineland-Palatinate
Wiesbaden Phantoms	Wiesbaden	Hesse

== GFL2 season placings ==
The placings in the league since 2000:

=== North ===
GFL2 North	00	01	02	03	04	05	06	07	08	09	10	11	12	13	14	15	16	17	18	19	~~20~~	21	22	23	24	25	26
Braunschweig Lions	GFL																										
Dresden Monarchs	4	2	1	GFL																							
Kiel Baltic Hurricanes	GFL				2	1	1	GFL																			
Berlin Rebels						2	5	5	6	1	GFL	2	GFL														
Potsdam Royals																5	3	1	GFL								
Hildesheim Invaders	7									8			7		5	1	GFL						3	1	GFL		
Düsseldorf Panther	GFL			1	GFL			4	4	5	2	GFL						2	1	GFL	*	2	GFL	2	1	GFL	
Krefeld Ravens																										3	1
Rostock Griffins														8				3	4	3	*	4	5	3	2	2	2
Hamburg Pioneers																									3	1	3
Leipzig Lions																										6	4
Elmshorn Fighting Pirates															8	8			3	1	GFL					5	5
Langenfeld Longhorns		5	3	5	6	3	4	2	3	4	3							4	5	4	*	3	2	4	4	4	6
Minden Wolves																											7
Paderborn Dolphins																3	2	5	7				1	GFL			
Lübeck Cougars			4	3	3	6	6	3	5	3	5	3	GFL	5	2	2	4	6	6	2	*	6	4	5	5	7	
Oldenburg Knights																								6	6	w	
Bielefeld Bulldogs					8									1	4	7	7								7		
Cottbus Crayfish													2	7											8		
Berlin Adler	3	1	GFL																8		*	1	GFL		w		
Cologne Crocodiles	GFL														3	4	1	GFL									
Münster Blackhawks																								7			
Solingen Paladins																			2	5	*	5	6	8			
Assindia Cardinals	1	GFL			7		7		1	GFL			8				6	8			*	8	7				
Hamburg Huskies ^{1}	2	4	6	4	5	4	2	1	2	7			4	3	1	GFL				6	*	7	8				
Hannover Spartans																				7							
Troisdorf Jets		7					3	6	8			4	3	2	7					8							
Bonn Gamecocks									7	6	7		6	4	6	6	5	7									
Ritterhude Badgers																	8										
Cologne Falcons					1	GFL				2	6	6	1	GFL													
Hamburg Blue Devils	GFL											1	GFL														
Osnabrück Tigers													5	6													
Mönchengladbach Mavericks											1	GFL															
Magdeburg Virgin Guards		6	5								4	5															
Recklinghausen Chargers											8																
Frankfurt Red Cocks								7																			
Weyhe Vikings					4	7		8																			
Hannover Musketeers			2	2	GFL	5																					
Bochum Cadets	6					8																					
Dortmund Giants	5	3																									

- In the 2000, 2001 and 2006 seasons, only seven clubs played in the league.
- In the 2002 and 2011 seasons, only six clubs played in the league.
- In the 2003 season, only five clubs played in the league.
- ^{1} Played as the Hamburg Wild Huskies until 2003, then as the Hamburg Eagles from 2004 to 2009 before becoming the Hamburg Huskies from 2010.

=== South ===
GFL2 South	00	01	02	03	04	05	06	07	08	09	10	11	12	13	14	15	16	17	18	19	~~20~~	21	22	23	24	25	26
Schwäbisch Hall Unicorns	2	GFL																									
Munich Cowboys	GFL				1	GFL		1	GFL																		
Allgäu Comets		3	3	3	6								1	1	GFL												
Ravensburg Razorbacks														4	6		5	2	1	1	GFL						
Saarland Hurricanes	1	GFL							5	4	1	GFL							2	2	*	GFL					
Straubing Spiders	6	6	8																3	3	*	1	GFL				
Pforzheim Wilddogs																								4	1	GFL	
Regensburg Phoenix																								3	3	1	GFL
Wiesbaden Phantoms					4	2	2	4	3	2	2	GFL			2	5	3	5	5	5	*	5	7			4	1
Albershausen Crusaders																		6	7						6	2	2
Augsburg Centurions																											3
Montabaur Fighting Farmers									4	7									8						2	8	4
Gießen Golden Dragons																	6	4	6	7			4	5	4	3	5
Biberach Beavers																				4	*					5	6
Nürnberg Rams													4	3	4	4	4	3	4	w						6	
Fursty Razorbacks			2	7														7			*	2	5	2	5	7	
Kirchdorf Wildcats^{1}				1	2	5	5	6	6			5	6	5	1	3	2	1	GFL		*	3	2	1	GFL	w	
Ingolstadt Dukes																2	1	GFL					1	GFL	w		
Frankfurt Universe													2	2	3	1	GFL							6	w		
Marburg Mercenaries	3	1	1	GFL																					w		
Bad Homburg Sentinels																						4	3	7			
Stuttgart Scorpions	GFL																						6	8			
Frankfurt Pirates												6	5	6	8						*	6	8				
Darmstadt Diamonds	4	2	6	2	3	1	GFL			3	5	4	8		7	7				6	*						
Rhein Neckar Bandits										5	4	2	GFL														
Franken Knights	GFL					4	4	2	2	1	3	1	GFL				7										
München Rangers																8	8										
Holzgerlingen Twister											6	3	7		5	6											
Starnberg Argonauts														7													
Kaiserslautern Pikes										6	8		3	8													
Plattling Black Hawks							3	3	1	GFL																	
Badener Greifs	7											7															
Weinheim Longhorns						3	1	GFL				8															
Hanau Hornets	8			5	5	6	6	8			7																
Stuttgart Silver Arrows						7			7	8																	
Königsbrunn Ants						8	7	5	8																		
Aschaffenburg Stallions	GFL							7																			
Jena Hanfrieds							8																				
Franken Timberwolves	5	5	4	6	7																						
Rhein Main Razorbacks	GFL																										
Mainz Golden Eagles			5	4																							
Rottenburg Red Knights		4	7																								
Landsberg Express	GFL																										

- In the 2003 and 2004 seasons, only seven clubs played in the league.
- In the 2001 season, only six clubs played in the league.
- ^{1} Played as the Simbach Wildcats until 2003.

GFL = Team played in GFL	Divisional champion

== Divisional champions ==
The winners of the regional divisions of the GFL:

Year	North	Central	South
1982	Hamburg Dolphins	Red Barons Cologne	Noris Rams
1983	Bonn Jets	Mannheim Redskins	Kempten Comets
1984	Dortmund Giants	Mainz Golden Eagles	Kempten Comets
1985	Cologne Crocodiles II	Stuttgart Scorpions	Rothenburg Knights

Year	North	West	Central	South
1986	Hildesheim Invaders	Recklinghausen Chargers	Schwäbisch Hall Unicorns	München Rangers
1987	Bremerhaven Seahawks	Ratingen Raiders	Schwäbisch Hall Unicorns	Würzburg Pumas
1988	Bremen Buccaneers	Recklinghausen Chargers	Rüsselsheim Crusaders	Königsbrunn Ants
1989	Hildesheim Invaders	Recklinghausen Chargers	Darmstadt Diamonds	Fürth Buffalos
1990	Hamburg Silver Eagles	Cologne Bears	Stuttgart Scorpions	Regensburg Royals
1991	Berlin Rebels	Cologne Bears	Stuttgart Scorpions	Regensburg Royals
1992	Hamburg Silver Eagles	Solingen Hurricanes	Hanau Hawks	Rothenburg Knights
1993	Braunschweig Lions	Cologne Bears	Frankfurt Gamblers	Erding Bulls
1994	Kiel Baltic Hurricanes	Tecklenburg Silverbacks	Stuttgart Scorpions	Simbach Wildcats

Year	North	South
1995	Kiel Baltic Hurricanes	Rüsselsheim Razorbacks
1996	Berlin Rebels	Landsberg Express
1997	Paderborn Dolphins	Saarland Hurricanes
1998	Berlin Rebels	Aschaffenburg Stallions
1999	Bremen Bravehearts	Franken Knights
2000	Assindia Cardinals	Saarland Hurricanes
2001	Berlin Adler	Marburg Mercenaries
2002	Dresden Monarchs	Marburg Mercenaries
2003	Düsseldorf Panther	Simbach Wildcats
2004	Cologne Falcons	Munich Cowboys
2005	Kiel Baltic Hurricanes	Darmstadt Diamonds
2006	Kiel Baltic Hurricanes	Weinheim Longhorns
2007	Hamburg Eagles	Munich Cowboys
2008	Assindia Cardinals	Plattling Black Hawks
2009	Berlin Rebels	Franken Knights
2010	Mönchengladbach Mavericks	Saarland Hurricanes
2011	Hamburg Blue Devils	Franken Knights
2012	Cologne Falcons	Allgäu Comets
2013	Bielefeld Bulldogs	Allgäu Comets
2014	Hamburg Huskies	Kirchdorf Wildcats
2015	Hildesheim Invaders	Frankfurt Universe
2016	Cologne Crocodiles	Ingolstadt Dukes
2017	Potsdam Royals	Kirchdorf Wildcats
2018	Düsseldorf Panther	Ravensburg Razorbacks
2019	Elmshorn Fighting Pirates	Ravensburg Razorbacks
2021	Berlin Adler	Straubing Spiders
2022	Paderborn Dolphins	Ingolstadt Dukes
2023	Hildesheim Invaders	Kirchdorf Wildcats
2024	Düsseldorf Panther	Pforzheim Wilddogs
2025	Hamburg Pioneers	Regensburg Phoenix
2026	Krefeld Ravens	Wiesbaden Phantoms
