= Mike Reed (American football coach) =

American football player and coach (born 1972)

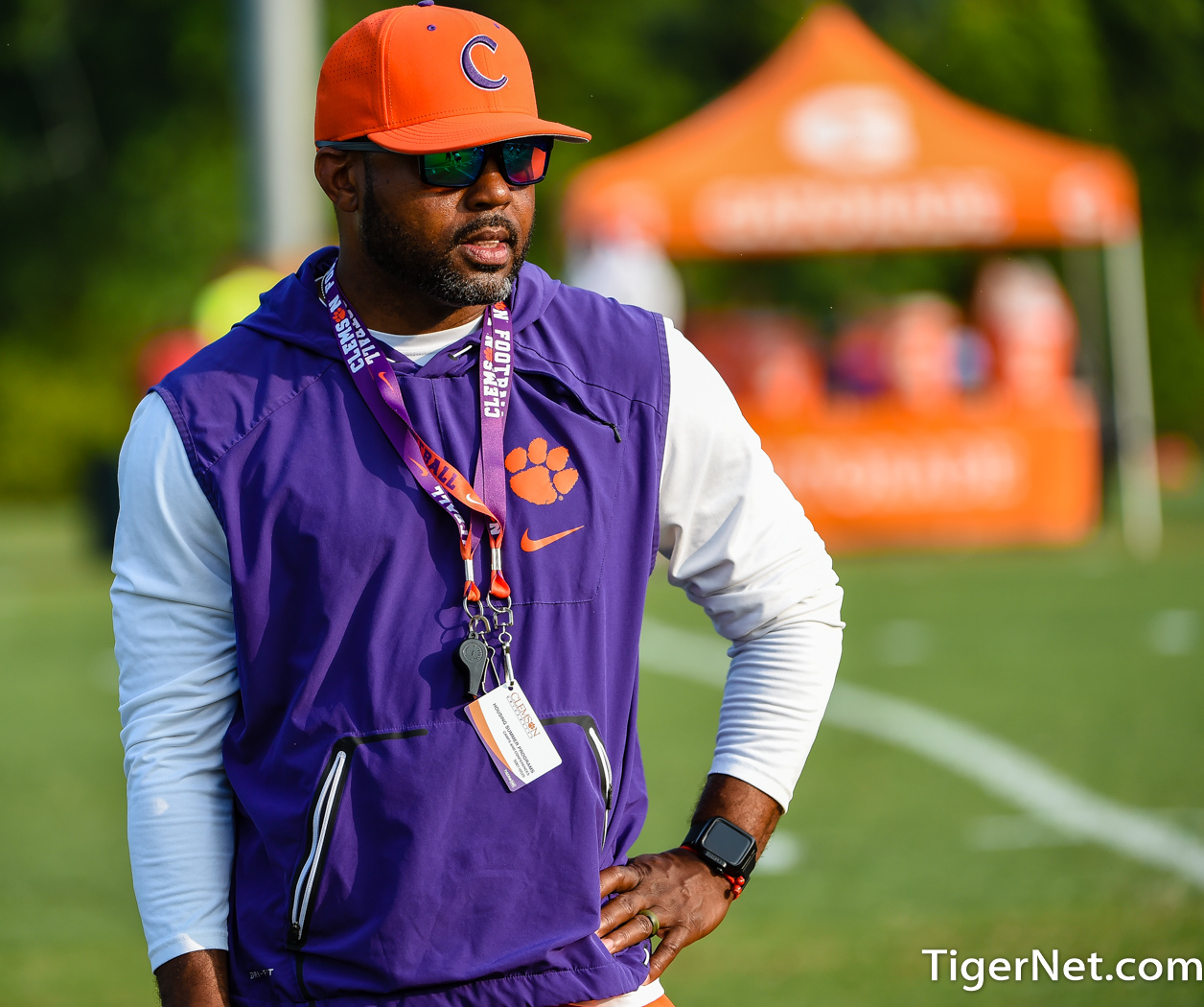

Current position
- Title: Assistant head coach, special teams coordinator, cornerbacks coach
- Team: Clemson
- Conference: ACC

Biographical details
- Born: August 16, 1972 (age 54); Wilmington, Delaware, U.S.

Playing career
- 1991–1994: Boston College
- 1995–1997: Carolina Panthers
- 1998–1999: Frankfurt Galaxy

Coaching career (HC unless noted)
- 2000: Kiel Baltic Hurricanes (DB)
- 2000–2001: Richmond (WR/TE/DB)
- 2002–2006: Philadelphia Eagles (ST/DB)
- 2007–2012: NC State (DB)
- 2013–2021: Clemson (DB)
- 2022–2023: Clemson (ST/CB)
- 2024–present: Clemson (AHC/ST/CB)

Accomplishments and honors

Championships
- 2× CFP national champion (2016, 2018)

Michael Jerome Reed (born August 16, 1972) is an American football coach and former player. He is the assistant head coach, special teams coordinator, and cornerbacks coach at Clemson University. He previously served as an assistant coach at North Carolina State University, Philadelphia Eagles, University of Richmond and Kiel Baltic Hurricanes.

== Playing career ==
Reed played college football at Boston College for four seasons. He was selected in the seventh round of the 1995 NFL draft as the final pick of the expansion Carolina Panthers making him Mr. Irrelevant. Reed played in three games (one in 1995 and two in 1996) and registered two tackles. He also played two seasons in the NFL Europe with the Frankfurt Galaxy.

== Coaching career ==
=== Kiel Baltic Hurricanes ===
Following his playing career, Reed began his coaching career as a defensive backs coach with the Kiel Baltic Hurricanes in 2000.

=== Richmond ===
In 2000, Reed joined the University of Richmond as their wide receivers, tight ends, and defensive backs coach.

=== Philadelphia Eagles ===
In 2002, Reed was hired by the Philadelphia Eagles to be their defensive backs and special teams coach under head coach Andy Reid.

=== NC State ===
In 2007, Reed joined North Carolina State University as their defensive backs coach.

=== Clemson ===
In 2013, Reed was named the defensive backs coach at Clemson University under head coach Dabo Swinney.

On December 14, 2021, Reed was promoted to special teams coordinator and cornerbacks coach.
