= 1994 West Virginia Mountaineers football team =

American college football season

1994 West Virginia Mountaineers football

Carquest Bowl, L 21–24 vs. South Carolina
- Conference: Big East Conference
- Record: 7–6 (4–3 Big East)
- Head coach: Don Nehlen (15th season)
- Defensive coordinator: Steve Dunlap (3rd season)
- Home stadium: Mountaineer Field

1994 Big East Conference football standings
	Conf.					Overall
Team	W		L		T	W		L		T
No. 6 Miami (FL) $	7	–	0	–	0	10	–	2	–	0
Virginia Tech	5	–	2	–	0	8	–	4	–	0
Syracuse	4	–	3	–	0	7	–	4	–	0
West Virginia	4	–	3	–	0	7	–	6	–	0
No. 23 Boston College	3	–	3	–	1	7	–	4	–	1
Rutgers	2	–	4	–	1	5	–	5	–	1
Pittsburgh	2	–	5	–	0	3	–	8	–	0
Temple	0	–	7	–	0	2	–	9	–	0
$ – Conference champion; Rankings from AP Poll

The 1994 West Virginia Mountaineers football team represented West Virginia University as a member of the Big East Conference during the 1994 NCAA Division I-A football season. Led by 15th-year head coach Don Nehlen, the Mountaineers compiled an overall record of 7–6 with a mark of 4–3 in conference play, tying for third place in the Big East. West Virginia was invited to the Carquest Bowl, where the Mountaineers lost to South Carolina. The team played home games at Mountaineer Field in Morgantown, West Virginia.

== Schedule ==
Date	Time	Opponent	Rank	Site	TV	Result	Attendance	Source
August 28	2:00 p.m.	vs. No. 4 Nebraska*	No. 24	Giants Stadium; East Rutherford, NJ (Kickoff Classic)	ABC	L 0–31	58,223	
September 3	1:00 p.m.	Ball State*		Mountaineer Field; Morgantown, WV		W 16–14	50,063	
September 10	12:00 p.m.	at Rutgers		Rutgers Stadium; Piscataway, NJ	BEN	L 12–17	31,624	
September 17	1:00 p.m.	Maryland*		Mountaineer Field; Morgantown, WV (rivalry)		L 13–24	62,852	
September 22	8:00 p.m.	at No. 14 Virginia Tech		Lane Stadium; Blacksburg, VA (rivalry)	ESPN	L 6–34	49,679	
October 1	2:00 p.m.	at Missouri*		Faurot Field; Columbia, MO		W 34–10	40,251	
October 15	12:00 p.m.	at Pittsburgh		Pitt Stadium; Pittsburgh, PA (Backyard Brawl)	BEN	W 47–41	38,293	
October 22	12:00 p.m.	No. 7 Miami (FL)		Mountaineer Field; Morgantown, WV	BEN	L 6–38	63,760	
October 29	1:00 p.m.	Louisiana Tech*		Mountaineer Field; Morgantown, WV		W 52–16	48,384	
November 12	1:00 p.m.	at Temple		Veterans Stadium; Philadelphia, PA		W 55–17	6,456	
November 19	12:00 p.m.	No. 17 Boston College		Mountaineer Field; Morgantown, WV	BEN	W 21–20	44,890	
November 24	8:00 p.m.	No. 22 Syracuse		Mountaineer Field; Morgantown, WV (rivalry)	ESPN	W 13–0	40,369	
January 2	1:30 p.m.	vs. South Carolina*		Joe Robbie Stadium; Miami Gardens, FL (Carquest Bowl)	CBS	L 21–24	50,833	
*Non-conference game; Rankings from AP Poll released prior to the game; All times are in Eastern time

== Roster ==
1994 West Virginia Mountaineers football team roster
Players
Coaches
Offense 70 Chris Klick OT 6' 8" 290 Jr * Douglassville, PA 71 Bryan Washington OT 6' 6" 310 So * Moorefield, WV 74 Bill McElroy C-OG 6' 3" 290 Fr Butler, PA 79 Tom Habak OG 6' 6" 290 So Wheeling, WV 79 Sam Austin OT 6' 4" 295 Fr 83 Chad Wable TE 6' 5" 260 Fr * Rivesville, WV 85 Clayton Ellwanger TE 6' 2" 245 So Miami, FL 88 Tony Minneyfield WR 6' 0" 180 So

Pos.	#	Name	Class
QB	8	Chad Johnston	So
FB	46	Kantroy Barber	Jr
G	69	Tom Robsock	Sr
G	72	Pete Tirado	Sr
OT	75	Joe DeLong	Jr
OT	76	Calvin Edwards	Sr
OT	78	Ed Green	Fr
TE	82	Lovett Purnell	Jr
TE	84	Anthony DiRito	Sr

Defense 48 Jamie Sweeney LB 6' 1" 225 Fr Greensburg, PA 49 Stephen Young LB 5' 11" 225 So Craigsville, WV

Pos.	#	Name	Class
DB	1	Vann Washington	So
SS	2	Charles Emanuel	So
LB	3	Matt Taffoni	Sr
DB	23	Mike Logan	So
CB	32	Aaron Beasley	Jr
LB	41	J. T. Thomas	Jr
LB	42	Canute Curtis	So
LB	42	Darin Glitz	So
LB	50	Steve Lippe	Fr
DT	51	Ryan Price	Fr
LB	91	Bernard Russ	So
DT	93	John Browning	Jr

Special teams

Pos.	#	Name	Class
P	16	Todd Sauerbrun	Sr

Head coach

- Don Nehlen

Coordinators/assistant coaches

Legend

- (C) Team captain
- (S) Suspended
- (I) Ineligible
- Injured
- Redshirt

== Team players in the NFL ==
Player	Position	Round	Pick	NFL club
Todd Sauerbrun	Punter	2	56	Chicago Bears
