= 1994 Virginia Tech Hokies football team =

American college football season

1994 Virginia Tech Hokies football

Gator Bowl, L 23–45 vs. Tennessee
- Conference: Big East Conference

Ranking
- Coaches: No. 24
- Record: 8–4 (5–2 Big East)
- Head coach: Frank Beamer (8th season)
- Offensive coordinator: Gary Tranquill (1st season)
- Offensive scheme: Pro-style
- Defensive coordinator: Phil Elmassian (2nd season)
- Base defense: 4–4
- Home stadium: Lane Stadium

1994 Big East Conference football standings
	Conf.					Overall
Team	W		L		T	W		L		T
No. 6 Miami (FL) $	7	–	0	–	0	10	–	2	–	0
Virginia Tech	5	–	2	–	0	8	–	4	–	0
Syracuse	4	–	3	–	0	7	–	4	–	0
West Virginia	4	–	3	–	0	7	–	6	–	0
No. 23 Boston College	3	–	3	–	1	7	–	4	–	1
Rutgers	2	–	4	–	1	5	–	5	–	1
Pittsburgh	2	–	5	–	0	3	–	8	–	0
Temple	0	–	7	–	0	2	–	9	–	0
$ – Conference champion; Rankings from AP Poll

The 1994 Virginia Tech Hokies football team represented Virginia Tech (formally the Virginia Polytechnic Institute and State University) as a member of the Big East Conference during the 1994 NCAA Division I-A football season. Led by eighth-year head coach Frank Beamer, the Hokies compiled an overall record of 8–4, with a mark of 5–2 in conference play, and finished second in the Big East. Virginia Tech played home games at Lane Stadium in Blacksburg, Virginia.

== Schedule ==
Date	Time	Opponent	Rank	Site	TV	Result	Attendance	Source
September 3	4:00 p.m.	Arkansas State*	No. 21	Lane Stadium; Blacksburg, VA		W 34–7	38,626	
September 10	6:00 p.m.	at Southern Miss*	No. 21	M. M. Roberts Stadium; Hattiesburg, MS		W 24–14	17,391	
September 17	12:00 p.m.	at Boston College	No. 18	Alumni Stadium; Chestnut Hill, MA (rivalry)	BEN	W 12–7	44,500	
September 22	8:00 p.m.	West Virginia	No. 14	Lane Stadium; Blacksburg, VA (rivalry)	ESPN	W 34–6	49,679	
October 1	3:30 p.m.	at Syracuse	No. 14	Carrier Dome; Syracuse, NY	ABC	L 20–28	47,635	
October 8	1:00 p.m.	Temple^{†}	No. 20	Lane Stadium; Blacksburg, VA		W 41–13	44,204	
October 15	1:30 p.m.	at East Carolina*	No. 19	Ficklen Memorial Stadium; Greenville, NC		W 27–20	34,741	
October 22	1:00 p.m.	Pittsburgh	No. 17	Lane Stadium; Blacksburg, VA		W 45–7	48,462	
October 29	3:30 p.m.	at No. 6 Miami (FL)	No. 13	Miami Orange Bowl; Miami, FL (rivalry)	ABC	L 3–24	57,618	
November 12	1:00 p.m.	Rutgers	No. 16	Lane Stadium; Blacksburg, VA		W 41–34	44,171	
November 19	12:00 p.m.	No. 16 Virginia*	No. 14	Lane Stadium; Blacksburg, VA (rivalry)	BEN	L 23–42	53,157	
December 30	7:30 p.m.	vs. Tennessee*	No. 17	Ben Hill Griffin Stadium; Gainesville, FL (Gator Bowl)	TBS	L 23–45	62,200	
*Non-conference game; ^{†}Homecoming; Rankings from AP Poll released prior to the game; All times are in Eastern time

== Rankings ==
Ranking movements Legend: ██ Increase in ranking ██ Decrease in ranking — = Not ranked
	Week																
Poll	Pre	1	2	3	4	5	6	7	8	9	10	11	12	13	14	15	Final
AP	22	21	21	18	14	14	20	19	17	13	17	16	14	18	17	17	—
Coaches Poll	19		18	16	12	10	17	14	13	10	16	12	11	16	15	15	24

== Roster ==
1994 Virginia Tech Hokies football team roster
Players
Coaches
Offense

Pos.	#	Name	Class
C	63	Bill Conaty
G	64	Gennaro DiNapoli	Fr
QB	16	Jim Druckenmiller	So
WR	80	Antonio Freeman	Sr
TE	81	Bryan Jennings	So
RB	28	Ken Oxendine	Fr
WR	17	Bryan Still

Defense

Pos.	#	Name	Class

Special teams

Pos.	#	Name	Class

Head coach

- Frank Beamer

Coordinators/assistant coaches

Legend

- (C) Team captain
- (S) Suspended
- (I) Ineligible
- Injured
- Redshirt
