= 1994 Rutgers Scarlet Knights football team =

American college football season

1994 Rutgers Scarlet Knights football
- Conference: Big East Conference
- Record: 5–5–1 (2–4–1 Big East)
- Head coach: Doug Graber (5th season)
- Offensive coordinator: Stan Parrish (5th season)
- Defensive coordinator: John Gutekunst (1st season)
- Home stadium: Rutgers Stadium; Giants Stadium

1994 Big East Conference football standings
	Conf.					Overall
Team	W		L		T	W		L		T
No. 6 Miami (FL) $	7	–	0	–	0	10	–	2	–	0
Virginia Tech	5	–	2	–	0	8	–	4	–	0
Syracuse	4	–	3	–	0	7	–	4	–	0
West Virginia	4	–	3	–	0	7	–	6	–	0
No. 23 Boston College	3	–	3	–	1	7	–	4	–	1
Rutgers	2	–	4	–	1	5	–	5	–	1
Pittsburgh	2	–	5	–	0	3	–	8	–	0
Temple	0	–	7	–	0	2	–	9	–	0
$ – Conference champion; Rankings from AP Poll

The 1994 Rutgers Scarlet Knights football team represented Rutgers University in the 1994 NCAA Division I-A football season. In their fifth season under head coach Doug Graber, the Scarlet Knights compiled a 5–5–1 record, were outscored by opponents 261 to 241, and finished in sixth place in the Big East Conference. The team's statistical leaders included Ray Lucas with 1,869 passing yards, Terrell Willis with 1,080 rushing yards, and Marco Battaglia with 779 receiving yards.

== Schedule ==
Date	Time	Opponent	Site	TV	Result	Attendance	Source
September 3		Kent State*	Rutgers Stadium; Piscataway, NJ		W 28–9	33,279	
September 10	12:00 pm	West Virginia	Rutgers Stadium; Piscataway, NJ	BEN	W 17–12	31,624	
September 17	7:30 pm	at Syracuse	Carrier Dome; Syracuse, NY		L 36–37	44,925	
September 24	12:00 pm	at No. 5 Penn State*	Beaver Stadium; University Park, PA	ESPN2	L 27–55	95,379	
October 1	12:00 pm	No. 13 Miami (FL)	Rutgers Stadium; Piscataway, NJ	BEN	L 3–24	39,719	
October 8		Army*	Giants Stadium; East Rutherford, NJ		W 16–14	20,511	
October 15		Cincinnati*	Rutgers Stadium; Piscataway, NJ		W 14–9	37,220	
October 22		at No. 22 Boston College	Alumni Stadium; Chestnut Hill, MA	BEN	T 7–7	44,500	
November 5		Temple	Rutgers Stadium; Piscataway, NJ		W 38–21	26,468	
November 12	1:00 pm	at No. 16 Virginia Tech	Lane Stadium; Blacksburg, VA		L 34–41	44,171	
November 19	1:30 pm	at Pittsburgh	Pitt Stadium; Pittsburgh, PA		L 21–35	28,463	
*Non-conference game; Rankings from AP Poll released prior to the game

== Roster ==
1994 Rutgers Scarlet Knights football team roster
Players
Coaches
Offense

Pos.	#	Name	Class
TE	81	Marco Battaglia	Jr
QB	1	Ray Lucas	Jr

Defense

Pos.	#	Name	Class

Special teams

Pos.	#	Name	Class

Head coach

- Doug Graber

Coordinators/assistant coaches

- John Gutekunst
  (Defensive coordinator & defensive backs coach)

Legend

- (C) Team captain
- (S) Suspended
- (I) Ineligible
- Injured
- Redshirt
