= 1994 Temple Owls football team =

American college football season

1994 Temple Owls football
- Conference: Big East Conference
- Record: 2–9 (0–7 Big East)
- Head coach: Ron Dickerson (2nd season)
- Offensive coordinator: Nick Gasparsto (2nd season)
- Defensive coordinator: Dale Strahm (1st season)
- Home stadium: Veterans Stadium

1994 Big East Conference football standings
	Conf.					Overall
Team	W		L		T	W		L		T
No. 6 Miami (FL) $	7	–	0	–	0	10	–	2	–	0
Virginia Tech	5	–	2	–	0	8	–	4	–	0
Syracuse	4	–	3	–	0	7	–	4	–	0
West Virginia	4	–	3	–	0	7	–	6	–	0
No. 23 Boston College	3	–	3	–	1	7	–	4	–	1
Rutgers	2	–	4	–	1	5	–	5	–	1
Pittsburgh	2	–	5	–	0	3	–	8	–	0
Temple	0	–	7	–	0	2	–	9	–	0
$ – Conference champion; Rankings from AP Poll

The 1994 Temple Owls football team represented Temple University as a member of the Big East Conference during the 1994 NCAA Division I-A football season. Led by second-year head coach Ron Dickerson, the Owls compiled an overall record of 2–9 with a mark of 0–7 in conference play, placing last out of eight teams in the Big East. Temple played home games at Veterans Stadium in Philadelphia.

== Schedule ==
Date	Time	Opponent	Site	Result	Attendance	Source
September 3		at Akron*	Rubber Bowl; Akron, OH	W 32–7		
September 17	6:00 p.m.	East Carolina*	Veterans Stadium; Philadelphia, PA	L 14–31	9,137	
September 24		at Army*	Michie Stadium; West Point, NY	W 23–20		
October 1	4:00 p.m.	No. 4 Penn State*	Franklin Field; Philadelphia, PA	L 21–48	38,140	
October 8	1:00 p.m.	at No. 20 Virginia Tech	Lane Stadium; Blacksburg, VA	L 13–41	44,204	
October 15		at No. 24 Boston College	Alumni Stadium; Chestnut Hill, MA	L 28–45	44,500	
October 22	6:00 p.m.	No. 16 Syracuse	Veterans Stadium; Philadelphia, PA	L 42–49	12,241	
October 29	12:00 p.m.	at Pittsburgh	Pitt Stadium; Pittsburgh, PA	L 19–45	22,483	
November 5		at Rutgers	Rutgers Stadium; Piscataway, NJ	L 21–38	26,468	
November 12	1:00 p.m.	West Virginia	Veterans Stadium; Philadelphia, PA	L 17–55	6,456	
November 19	1:00 p.m.	No. 5 Miami (FL)	Veterans Stadium; Philadelphia, PA	L 14–38	11,873	
*Non-conference game; Rankings from AP Poll released prior to the game; All times are in Eastern time
