= 1994 Syracuse Orangemen football team =

American college football season

1994 Syracuse Orangemen football
- Conference: Big East Conference
- Record: 7–4 (4–3 Big East)
- Head coach: Paul Pasqualoni (4th season)
- Offensive coordinator: George DeLeone (8th season)
- Defensive coordinator: Norm Gerber (11th season)
- Captains: Wilky Bazile; Eric Chenoweth; Dan Conley; Tony Jones
- Home stadium: Carrier Dome

1994 Big East Conference football standings
| | Conf. | | | | | Overall |
| Team | W | | L | | T | W | | L | | T |
|---|---|---|---|---|---|---|---|---|---|---|
| No. 6 Miami (FL) $ | 7 | – | 0 | – | 0 | 10 | – | 2 | – | 0 |
| Virginia Tech | 5 | – | 2 | – | 0 | 8 | – | 4 | – | 0 |
| Syracuse | 4 | – | 3 | – | 0 | 7 | – | 4 | – | 0 |
| West Virginia | 4 | – | 3 | – | 0 | 7 | – | 6 | – | 0 |
| No. 23 Boston College | 3 | – | 3 | – | 1 | 7 | – | 4 | – | 1 |
| Rutgers | 2 | – | 4 | – | 1 | 5 | – | 5 | – | 1 |
| Pittsburgh | 2 | – | 5 | – | 0 | 3 | – | 8 | – | 0 |
| Temple | 0 | – | 7 | – | 0 | 2 | – | 9 | – | 0 |
$ – Conference champion; Rankings from AP Poll

The 1994 Syracuse Orangemen football team represented Syracuse University as a member of the Big East Conference during the 1994 NCAA Division I-A football season. Led by fourth-year head coach Paul Pasqualoni, the Orangemen compiled an overall record of 7–4 with a mark of 4–3 in conference play, tying for third place in the Big East. Syracuse played home games at the Carrier Dome in Syracuse, New York.

== Schedule ==
| Date | Time | Opponent | Rank | Site | TV | Result | Attendance | Source |
|---|---|---|---|---|---|---|---|---|
| September 3 | 7:30 pm | No. 16 Oklahoma* | | Carrier Dome; Syracuse, NY | ESPN | L 29–30 | 48,421 | |
| September 10 | 7:00 pm | at Cincinnati* | | Nippert Stadium; Cincinnati, OH | | W 34–19 | 21,735 | |
| September 17 | 7:30 pm | Rutgers | | Carrier Dome; Syracuse, NY | | W 37–36 | 44,925 | |
| September 24 | 4:00 pm | at East Carolina* | | Ficklen Memorial Stadium; Greenville, NC | | W 21–18 | 33,127 | |
| October 1 | 3:30 pm | No. 14 Virginia Tech | | Carrier Dome; Syracuse, NY | ABC | W 28–20 | 47,635 | |
| October 8 | 12:00 pm | Pittsburgh | No. 21 | Carrier Dome; Syracuse, NY (rivalry) | BEN | W 31–7 | 47,622 | |
| October 22 | 6:00 pm | at Temple | No. 16 | Veterans Stadium; Philadelphia, PA | | W 49–42 | 12,241 | |
| November 5 | 3:30 pm | No. 5 Miami (FL) | No. 10 | Carrier Dome; Syracuse, NY | ABC | L 6–27 | 49,565 | |
| November 12 | 12:00 pm | at No. 25 Boston College | No. 14 | Alumni Stadium; Chestnut Hill, MA | BEN | L 0–31 | 44,500 | |
| November 19 | 12:00 pm | Maryland* | No. 24 | Carrier Dome; Syracuse, NY | | W 21–16 | 48,309 | |
| November 24 | 8:00 pm | at West Virginia | No. 22 | Mountaineer Field; Morgantown, WV (rivalry) | ESPN | L 0–13 | 40,369 | |
*Non-conference game; Rankings from AP Poll released prior to the game; All times are in Eastern time

== Roster ==
1994 Syracuse Orangemen football team roster
Players
Coaches
Offense

| Pos. | # | Name | Class |
|---|---|---|---|
| RB | 42 | Kirby Dar Dar | Sr |
| WR | 8 | Marvin Harrison | Jr |
| LT | 74 | Melvin Tuten | Sr |
| C | 55 | Dave Wohlabaugh | Sr |

Defense

| Pos. | # | Name | Class |

Special teams

| Pos. | # | Name | Class |

Head coach

- Paul Pasqualoni

Coordinators/assistant coaches

Legend

- (C) Team captain
- (S) Suspended
- (I) Ineligible
- Injured
- Redshirt
