= Pete Correale =

American actor

- Born: April 20, 1970 (age 56); Long Island, New York City
- Spouse: Jackie Correale
- Children: 1

Comedy career
- Medium: Stand-up, Writing
- Website: PeteCorreale.com

Peter Correale (born April 20, 1970, in Oakdale, New York) is an American actor, stand up comedian, and writer. He currently co-hosts The Sebastian Maniscalco Show podcast (previously known as The Pete and Sebastian Show) with fellow comedian Sebastian Maniscalco that airs weekly on SiriusXM channel 99. In addition, he was a writer and occasional performer on the CBS sitcom Kevin Can Wait.

== Early life and education ==
Pete Correale was born and raised on Long Island, New York. He graduated from SUNY Fredonia in 1992 with a degree in communication, and also played on the school basketball team. During this time, he took a drama class that inspired him to pursue a career in show business.

== Career ==
After graduating, Correale moved to New York City to perform improvisation comedy and did part-time acting. He debuted as a stand up comic at the age of 24. He exchanged stage time for cooking burgers and mopping floors at many of the clubs he worked in. He released his first comedy CD, Give It a Rest, in 2013. In addition, he served as a co-host of the former Bruer Unleashed Show on SiriusXM.

As a comedian, Correale has worked with Dave Chappelle, Jay Mohr, Jeffrey Ross, and most recently toured with Brian Regan.

=== Specials ===
- The Things We Do for Love (2009)
- Give it a Rest (2013)
- Let Me Tell Ya (2015)
- For Pete’s Sake (2020)
- Good Hanging (2026)

== Personal life ==
Correale lives in Pittsford, New York with his wife, Jackie, and their daughter, Sadie.
