= Work It (TV series) =

American television sitcom

- Genre: Sitcom
- Created by: Andrew Reich; Ted Cohen
- Starring: Ben Koldyke; Amaury Nolasco; Beth Lacke; John Caparulo; Rebecca Mader; Rochelle Aytes; Kate Reinders; Kirstin Eggers; Hannah Sullivan
- Composers: Stephen Robert Phillips; Tim Paruszkiewicz
- Country of origin: United States
- Original language: English
- No. of seasons: 1
- No. of episodes: 13 (11 unaired in the U.S.)

Production
- Executive producers: Andrew Reich; Ted Cohen
- Camera setup: Multi-camera
- Running time: 30 minutes
- Production companies: Summer School Productions; Bonanza Productions; Warner Bros. Television

Original release
- Network: ABC
- Release: January 3, 2012 – November 6, 2013

Work It is an American television sitcom that aired on ABC from January 3 to January 10, 2012. Set in St. Louis, the series is about two men who must dress as women in order to keep a job in a bad economy.

The series was universally panned by critics. The series premiere was watched by an American audience of 6.16 million. After the show attracted controversy from advocate groups, particularly in the LGBTQ+ community, ratings dropped to 4.9 million viewers in the second episode, and the series was cancelled by ABC on January 13, 2012, after two episodes aired, following another attempt at a "man-cession" comedy called Man Up!, which failed earlier in the season.

== Cast ==
- Ben Koldyke as Lee Standish
- Amaury Nolasco as Angel Ortiz
- Beth Lacke as Connie Standish
- John Caparulo as Brian
- Rebecca Mader as Grace Hudson
- Rochelle Aytes as Vanessa Warner
- Kate Reinders as Kelly
- Kirstin Eggers as Kristin
- Hannah Sullivan as Kat Standish

In the unaired pilot, Kacie Lynch played the role of Kat before she was replaced by Hannah Sullivan.

== Episodes ==
No.	Title	Directed by	Written by	Original release date	Prod. code	U.S. viewers (millions)
ABC Airing
1	"Pilot"	Beth McCarthy-Miller	Ted Cohen & Andrew Reich	January 3, 2012	296805	6.16
2	"Shake Your Money Maker"	Gary Halvorson	Ted Cohen & Andrew Reich	January 10, 2012	2J6452	4.90
New Zealand Airing
3	"Girl Fight"	Jeff Melman	Lindsey Shockley	August 28, 2013	2J6457	N/A
4	"Field of Schemes"	Shelley Jensen	Mark Cullen & Robb Cullen	September 4, 2013	2J6463	N/A
5	"Close Shave"	Gary Halvorson	Mark Cullen & Robb Cullen	September 11, 2013	2J6453	N/A
6	"Space Invaders"	Gary Halvorson	Joe Lawson	September 18, 2013	2J6454	N/A
7	"Breast Awareness Week"	Shelley Jensen	Claudia Lonow	September 25, 2013	2J6455	N/A
8	"Immaculate Deception"	Jeff Melman	Brian Keith Etheridge	October 2, 2013	2J6456	N/A
9	"Surprise Package"	Beth McCarthy-Miller	Ted Cohen & Andrew Reich	October 9, 2013	2J6458	N/A
10	"Hunger Games"	Andrew D. Weyman	Eric Goldberg & Peter Tibbals	October 16, 2013	2J6459	N/A
11	"Cinderella Story"	Andrew D. Weyman	Joe Lawson	October 23, 2013	2J6460	N/A
12	"Masquerade Balls"	Shelley Jensen	Claudia Lonow	October 30, 2013	2J6461	N/A
13	"My So-Called Mid-Life Crisis"	Shelley Jensen	Steve Gabriel	November 6, 2013	2J6462	N/A

== Reception ==
=== Critical reception ===
Reception for the series was very negative; it was largely panned by critics and viewers alike. Metacritic gave it a score of 19/100 (overwhelming dislike) based on 22 reviews. Matt Fowler of IGN gave the pilot episode a score of "0", a rating which IGN had not used since Olympic Hockey '98 (according to Fowler). Robert Bianco of USA Today also did not give it an enthusiastic review, calling it "witless, tasteless, poorly acted, abominably written, clumsily directed, hideously lit and badly costumed". He gave it a grade of one star out of four. The Pittsburgh Post-Gazette reviewer compared the show unfavorably to Bosom Buddies, which had a similar premise. Emily St. James of The A.V. Club gave the pilot an F grade, stating, "Let's just get this out of the way first: Work It is awful. The grade should indicate that. But it's fascinatingly awful, in that way where you wonder how the hell something like this got on TV in the year 2012." Alan Pergament, formerly of The Buffalo News, expressed surprise that the show even made it to air, stating "I do recall I couldn't get those 22 minutes of my life back. It was so unfunny and forced that I suspected it would never air."

=== Controversy ===
LGBTQ advocacy groups expressed concerns about Work It, saying that it trivializes the obstacles faced by transgender people in the workplace. Groups that expressed concern include Human Rights Campaign, the Los Angeles Gay and Lesbian Center's Transgender Economic Empowerment Program and the Transgender Law Center. The Gay and Lesbian Alliance Against Defamation released a statement that, while acknowledging that the series pilot "does not explicitly address transgender people", still concluded that "[d]uring a period in which the transgender community now routinely finds itself in the cultural crosshairs, the timing couldn’t be worse for a show based on the notion that men dressed as women is inherently funny." Frequently cited is the print advertisement for the series, which features two men dressed as women standing at men's room urinals.

The pilot was criticized and protests took place at the network offices for a line of dialogue delivered by Amaury Nolasco's character Angel, who claimed that as a Puerto Rican he would "be great at selling drugs".

=== Ratings ===
The pilot episode scored a 2.0 adults 18-49 rating and 6.160 million viewers. The second and last episode saw a 25% drop in the adults 18-49 demo, scoring only a 1.5.

Episode number Production number	Title	Original airing	Rating	Share	Rating/share (18–49)	U.S. viewers (in millions)	Rank per week	Note
1; 1-01	Pilot	January 3, 2012	3.8	6	2.0/5	6.160	TBA	
2; 1-02	Shake Your Money Maker	January 10, 2012	3.2	5	1.5/4	4.90	TBA	

== See also ==
- Cross-dressing in film and television
- Three's Company (1977)
- Tootsie (1982)
- Bosom Buddies
