= Bookie (TV series) =

American comedy television series

- Genre: Comedy
- Created by: Chuck Lorre; Nick Bakay
- Starring: Sebastian Maniscalco; Omar Dorsey; Andrea Anders; Vanessa Ferlito; Jorge Garcia; Maxim Swinton; Rob Corddry
- Opening theme: "Bookie Theme Song"
- Ending theme: "Bookie Theme Song"
- Country of origin: United States
- Original language: English
- No. of seasons: 2
- No. of episodes: 16

Production
- Executive producers: Chuck Lorre; Nick Bakay; Sebastian Maniscalco; Judi Marmel; Andy Tennant
- Producer: Scott Printz
- Production location: Los Angeles County, California
- Camera setup: Single-camera
- Running time: 18–28 minutes
- Production companies: Chuck Lorre Productions; Warner Bros. Television

Original release
- Network: Max
- Release: November 30, 2023 – January 30, 2025

Bookie is an American comedy television series created by Chuck Lorre and Nick Bakay starring Sebastian Maniscalco, Omar Dorsey, Andrea Anders, Vanessa Ferlito, Jorge Garcia, and Maxim Swinton. It premiered on Max on November 30, 2023. In January 2024, the series was renewed for a second season which premiered on December 12, 2024. In February 2025, the series was canceled after two seasons.

== Premise ==
A veteran bookie must fight to survive the legalization of sports gambling, increasingly unstable clients, and fast-paced life in Los Angeles.

== Cast ==
=== Main ===
- Sebastian Maniscalco as Danny Colavito
- Omar Dorsey as Rayfield "Ray" Ballard
- Andrea Anders as Sandra
- Vanessa Ferlito as Lorraine Colavito
- Jorge Garcia as Hector
- Maxim Swinton as Anthony
- Rob Corddry as Walt Dinty
- Selina Kaye as Janelle

=== Recurring ===
- Arnetia Walker as Grandma Marion
- Toby Huss as Carl Lurtsema
- Dale Dickey as Wendy

=== Guest ===
- Charlie Sheen as himself
- Patrick Cage as Tarifa
- Jennifer Taylor as Crying Woman
- Eugene Byrd as himself
- Eddie Gorodetsky as himself
- Angus T. Jones as himself
- Ray Romano as Artie
- Izzy Diaz as Jerry the Waiter
- Jack Doolan as Bobby Knox
- Wayne Knight as Cowboy
- C. S. Lee as Jack Han
- Bob Clendenin as Gregory
- Rebekah Graf as Girlfriend
- Brent Jennings as John Franklin
- Laraine Newman as Eileen
- Danny Woodburn as Petey
- Jeff Perry as Accountant
- Christopher Shyer as Patrick Ryan
- Jay Huguley as Dr. Hegland
- Roma Maffia as Nancy
- Stephen Guarino as Viggy
- Nelson Franklin as Kevin Miller
- DJ Qualls as Alan
- Ashley Spillers as Mrs. Miller
- Joanna Sotomura as Gabby
- Zach Braff as Loco Rocco
- Brad Garrett as Brad

== Episodes ==
=== Series overview ===
Season	Episodes	Originally released	
Season	Episodes	First released	Last released
1	8	November 30, 2023	December 21, 2023
2	8	December 12, 2024	January 30, 2025

=== Season 1 (2023) ===
No. overall	No. in season	Title	Directed by	Written by	Original release date	Prod. code
1	1	"Always Smell the Money"	Chuck Lorre	Chuck Lorre & Nick Bakay	November 30, 2023	T12.17851
2	2	"Making Lemonade"	Andy Tennant	Chuck Lorre & Nick Bakay	November 30, 2023	T12.17852
3	3	"Trust Your Sphincter"	Andy Tennant	Chuck Lorre & Nick Bakay	December 7, 2023	T12.17853
4	4	"Some Whales Nix the Vig"	Andy Tennant	Chuck Lorre & Nick Bakay	December 7, 2023	T12.17854
5	5	"Beware the Family Jewels"	Ken Whittingham	Chuck Lorre & Nick Bakay	December 14, 2023	T12.17855
6	6	"Nepo Bookies"	Kyle Newacheck	Chuck Lorre & Nick Bakay	December 14, 2023	T12.17856
7	7	"The Super Bowl: God's Gift to Bookies"	Andy Tennant	Chuck Lorre & Nick Bakay	December 21, 2023	T12.17857
Note: This episode was dedicated to Marvin Miles, who died on August 3, 2023 at the age of 72. The vanity card reads: "In Memory of "Marvelous" Marvin Miles".
8	8	"A Square Job in a Round Hole"	Andy Tennant	Chuck Lorre & Nick Bakay	December 21, 2023	T12.17858

=== Season 2 (2024–25) ===
No. overall	No. in season	Title	Directed by	Written by	Original release date	Prod. code
9	1	"Mahnanga"	Andy Tennant	Chuck Lorre & Nick Bakay	December 12, 2024	201
10	2	"Go to the Labia"	Andy Tennant	Chuck Lorre & Nick Bakay	December 19, 2024	202
11	3	"Boom, Done, Hello Jesus"	Andy Tennant	Chuck Lorre & Nick Bakay	December 26, 2024	203
12	4	"Make It Look Like an Accident"	Richard L. Fox	Chuck Lorre & Nick Bakay	January 2, 2025	204
13	5	"Fruit's for Partners"	Andy Tennant	Chuck Lorre & Nick Bakay	January 9, 2025	205
14	6	"Spooning Is Not Necrophilia"	Andy Tennant	Chuck Lorre & Nick Bakay	January 16, 2025	206
15	7	"Sphincter Money"	Andy Tennant	Chuck Lorre & Nick Bakay	January 23, 2025	207
16	8	"A Whale in Pomona"	Andy Tennant	Chuck Lorre & Nick Bakay	January 30, 2025	208

== Production ==
=== Development ===
On October 4, 2022, it was announced that HBO Max had given an eight-episode straight-to-series order to a comedy series created by Chuck Lorre and Nick Bakay, titled How to Be a Bookie. It was also announced that Sebastian Maniscalco would star in a leading role in the series. Lorre (through his Chuck Lorre Productions banner), Nick Bakay, Maniscalco and Judi Marmel are executive producers for Warner Bros. Television. Bookie premiered on Max on November 30, 2023. On January 5, 2024, Max renewed the series for a second season, which premiered on December 12, 2024. In February 2025, the series was canceled after two seasons.

=== Casting ===
On November 7, 2022, it was announced that Omar Dorsey, Andrea Anders, Vanessa Ferlito and Jorge Garcia had joined the cast. On December 13, 2022, it was announced that Maxim Swinton had also joined the cast. On April 17, 2023, Charlie Sheen joined the cast in a recurring role.

=== Filming ===
Bookie was filmed in Los Angeles County, California. Champs Sports Pub in Burbank, California, was used as a shooting location in several episodes.

== Release ==
The first season of Bookie was released on Max from November 30 to December 21, 2023. The second season of Bookie was released on Max from December 12, 2024 to January 30, 2025.

== Reception ==
On the review aggregator website Rotten Tomatoes, 90% of 10 critics' reviews of season one are positive. The website's critics consensus reads, "Bookie may harbor old-school sensibilities, but Chuck Lorre and Sebastian Maniscalco manage to bring a new-age sense of the everyday to this meshing of hilarious worlds."
