= Elmshorn Fighting Pirates =

- Founded: 1991
- League: German Football League
- Based in: Elmshorn, Germany
- Stadium: Krückaustadion
- Head coach: Jörn Maier
- Website: fighting-pirates.net

The Elmshorn Fighting Pirates are an American football team from Elmshorn, Germany.

The club's greatest achievement is winning the championship in the GFL2 North in 2019 and - after winning the promotion/relegation round against the Düsseldorf Panther qualifying for the 2020 season in the top tier German Football League. However, as the 2020 season was never played due to COVID-19, and with competition from a Hamburg based team in the upstart European League of Football (ELF) worsening the doubtful financial situation, the Fighting Pirates ultimately withdrew from the GFL without ever having played a single match in their "theoretical" year of league membership. Unlike the Hildesheim Invaders and the Ingolstadt Dukes who took similar decisions after failing to move their teams to the upstart European League of Football and went on to play in their respective (third tier) Regionalliga, the Fighting Pirates ultimately played only in the sixth tier Landesliga West

== History ==
The Fighting Pirates were formed in 1991 and entered the German league competition one year later. In 1999 the Fighting Pirates had to quit the competition due to a lack of players. 2001 they re-entered the competition in the fifth tier. In 2004 the Fighting Pirates reached the Regionalliga, the third level. After being relegated and promoted again, Elmshorn reached the GFL2 for the first time in 2014. They finished 2014 and 2015 on the last place and got relegated after the second season. In 2018 the team returned to the GFL2 North and this time more successful. After finishing third in the 2018 season, the Fighting Pirates won the league title in 2019. In the following promotion game, they defeated Düsseldorf Panther and qualified for the German Football League. Unfortunately for them COVID-19 made it impossible to hold the 2020 German Football League season as planned and thus what would have been their first season in the top tier of their sport never took place. Having taken a financial and emotional hit from Covid, the still unclear situation going into 2021 and coaches like Andreas Nommensen as well as Sportdirektor Max Paatz leaving for the Hamburg Sea Devils of the new European League of Football and the threat of many players following them ultimately led to the decision being taken that Elmshorn would not play in the GFL in 2021. Due to not yet having a reserve team (their foundation had been planned for 2020/21), the Fighting Pirates had to restart in the sixth tier Landesliga West.

== Honours ==
- GFL2
  - Northern Division champions: 2019

== Recent seasons ==
Recent seasons of the club:

Year	Division	Finish	Points	Pct.	Games	W	D	L	PF	PA	Postseason
2016	Regionalliga Nord (3rd level)	2nd	12–4	0.750	8	6	0	2	235	106	—
2017	Regionalliga Nord (3rd level)	1st	22–2	0.917	12	11	0	1	444	164	Lost PR: Solingen Paladins (7–21) Won PR: Berlin Bears (45–28)
2018	GFL2 (North)	3rd	16–12	0.571	14	8	0	6	538	466	—
2019	GFL2 (North)	1st	24–4	0.857	14	12	0	2	561	279	Won PR: Düsseldorf Panther (47–14 & 34–21)
2020	GFL (North)	No season played because of the COVID-19 pandemic									
2021	Landesliga Nord (6th level)	1st	8–0	1.000	4	4	0	0	198	28	—
2022	Verbandsliga Nord (5th level)	1st	10–0	1.000	5	5	0	0	220	27	—
2023	Oberliga Nord (4th level)	1st	16–0	1.000	8	8	0	0	442	45	—
2024	Regionalliga Nord (3rd level)	1st	12–0	1.000	6	6	0	0	184	68	—
2025	GFL2 (North)	5th	8–12	0.400	10	4	–	6	301	362	—
2026	GFL2 (North)	5th	8–12	0.400	10	4	–	6	256	354	—

- PR = Promotion round
