= John Caparulo =

American stand-up comedian

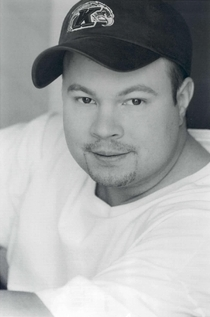
- Born: September 22, 1975 (age 51); East Liverpool, Ohio
- Notable work: Vince Vaughn's Wild West Comedy Tour; Chelsea Lately; Work It; Mobile Home Disaster
- Spouse: Jamie Caparulo
- Children: 1

Comedy career
- Years active: 1997 – present
- Medium: Stand-up; Acting
- Genre: Observational
- Website: www.johncaparulo.com

John Caparulo (born September 22, 1975) is an American stand-up comedian.

== Early life ==
Caparulo grew up in East Liverpool, Ohio and graduated from Kent State University in 1998. Caparulo started his stand-up career in night clubs in Cleveland and Pittsburgh in 1997. He then spent several years working as a doorman at the Comedy Store in Hollywood, Los Angeles and as a groundskeeper at a local golf course.

== Career ==
Caparulo first appeared at the 2003 Just for Laughs festival in Montreal, where he was offered a sitcom, and a spot on The Late Late Show with Craig Kilborn. He has since appeared on The Tonight Show, was featured on Blue Collar Comedy Tour: The Next Generation hosted by Bill Engvall, and was one of the comedians documented on Vince Vaughn's Wild West Comedy Tour. He hosted Mobile Home Disaster on CMT, and played the part of 'Brian' on the short-lived ABC sitcom Work It. He also has a comedy special that aired on Comedy Central on December 21, 2008 called John Caparulo: Meet Cap which was directed by Dave Higby. The special was released on CD on February 10, 2009 and on DVD on April 14, 2009. Caparulo intermittently hosts The Mad Cap Hour radio show with his wife Jamie Caparulo and comedian Mark Ellis on Sirius XM, toadhopnetwork.com, and iTunes.

Caparulo regularly appeared on the E! show Chelsea Lately during its 7-year run. He voices the character Headphone Joe on Disney's Fish Hooks.

Caparulo released his second album titled Come Inside Me in August 2013 on Netflix. In February 2014, Cap began releasing Caplets, a brand-new set of comedy every 30 days that he shoots at the Comedy and Magic Club in Hermosa Beach, California and The Ice House in Pasadena, CA, and distributes them on his website for free.

Since 2014, Cap has been writing and developing an animated series called “Cartoon Comic,” based on his life as a comedian, husband, and father. Cap has written a comic book series under the same title and has independently produced several animated standup shorts for his website and YouTube.

In 2018, Caesars Entertainment offered Caparulo a weekly residency show. He consistently performs "John Caparulo's Mad Cap Comedy" five nights a week at Harrah's Las Vegas.

== Personal life ==
On the November 4th, 2010 episode of Chelsea Lately, John announced that he proposed to Jamie Marie Kelly after his October 29 performance at the Comedy & Magic Club in Hermosa Beach, California. John and Jamie were wed at Water Street Tavern near their alma mater, Kent State University, on May 27, 2012. The couple currently resides in Calabasas, California and Las Vegas, Nevada with their three dogs, a Basset Hound, a puggle, and a rescued collie mix. On their October 10, 2014, #26 Domestic Disputes podcast Jamie reveals to John that they are having a child. On November 27, 2014 #28 of their podcast they reveal that their child is going to be a girl and that they are going to name her Madden Jae. They welcomed Madden Jae on May 22, 2015.

== Discography ==
Title	Details	Peak chart positions	
Title	Details	US Comedy	US Country
John Caparulo: Meet Cap	Release date: February 10, 2009; Label: Warner Bros. Nashville	8	—
Come Inside Me	Release date: September 17, 2013; Label: Warner Bros. Nashville	2	59
"—" denotes releases that did not chart

== Television appearances ==
Year	Show	Network	Episode (name, # and/or airdate)	Role
2003 - 2004	The Late Late Show with Craig Kilborn	CBS	"James Marsden, Alex Kingston, and John Caparulo" (Episode 967); May 7, 2003 "Eric Idle, Lauren Holly, and John Caparulo" (Episode 1,170); May 5, 2004	Performer
2004	ESPN25: Who's #1?	ESPN	"Most Outrageous Characters"; July 13, 2004	Interviewee
2005	Premium Blend	Comedy Central	"Alex Ortiz, Ophira Eisenberg, Matt Iseman and John Caparulo" (Episode 802); February 4, 2005	Performer
2005–2008	The Tonight Show with Jay Leno	NBC	"Avril Lavigne, Pamela Anderson, Selma Blair and John Caparulo" (Episode 2,988); August 12, 2005, "Jennifer Aniston, John Caparulo, The All-American Rejects" (Episode 3,116); April 4, 2006, Episode ?,??? January 5, 2008	Guest/Performer
2006	Comedy Central Presents: John Caparulo	Comedy Central	Episode #171; April 7, 2006	Performer
2008	Mobile Home Disaster	CMT	All episodes	Host
2008–2014	Chelsea Lately	E!	Recurring	Roundtable panelist
2008	John Caparulo: Meet Cap	Comedy Central	December 21, 2008	Performer
2009	The International Sexy Ladies Show	G4	June 7, 2009	Commentator

== Filmography ==
Year	Title	Release date	Role	Notes
2006	Vince Vaughn's Wild West Comedy Tour	February 8, 2008	Performer	First shown at 2006 Toronto; International Film Festival.
2007	Blue Collar Comedy Tour: The Next Generation	November 17, 2007	Performer	Live performance for TV, never aired.

== See also ==
- List of comedians
- List of stand-up comedians
