= Sean Fitzgerald =

English cricketer

Personal information
- Full name: Sean Martin Fitzgerald
- Born: 21 August 1962 (age 64); Bridport, Dorset, England
- Batting: Right-handed
- Role: Wicketkeeper

Domestic team information
- Years: Team
- 1989–1992: Dorset

Career statistics
Competition	List A
Matches	1
Runs scored	2
Batting average	2
100s/50s	0/0
Top score	2
Catches/stumpings	0/2
- Source: Cricinfo, 17 March 2010

Sean Martin Fitzgerald (born 21 August 1962) is a former English List A cricketer. Fitzgerald was a right-handed batsman who primarily played as a wicket-keeper.

Fitzgerald made his debut for Dorset in the 1989 Minor Counties Championship against Berkshire. From 1989 to 1992 Fitzgerald represented Dorset in 18 Minor Counties matches, with his final match coming against Wales Minor Counties.

Fitzgerald also played a single List A cricket match for Dorset in the first round of the 1990 NatWest Trophy against Glamorgan. He scored two runs and made two stumpings in the match.

Fitzgerald played in the Dorset Premier League for Dorchester CC, where he was also the head coach. He also coached the Wessex Cricket School. He has featured for the Dorset over-50 side.
