= 1994 VMI Keydets football team =

American college football season

1994 VMI Keydets football
- Conference: Southern Conference
- Record: 1–10 (1–7 SoCon)
- Head coach: Bill Stewart (1st season)
- Home stadium: Alumni Memorial Field

1994 Southern Conference football standings
	Conf.					Overall
Team	W		L		T	W		L		T
No. 2 Marshall $^	7	–	1	–	0	12	–	2	–	0
No. 17 Appalachian State ^	6	–	2	–	0	9	–	4	–	0
Georgia Southern	5	–	3	–	0	6	–	5	–	0
Western Carolina	5	–	3	–	0	6	–	5	–	0
The Citadel	4	–	4	–	0	6	–	5	–	0
East Tennessee State	4	–	4	–	0	6	–	5	–	0
Furman	2	–	6	–	0	3	–	8	–	0
Chattanooga	2	–	6	–	0	3	–	8	–	0
VMI	1	–	7	–	0	1	–	10	–	0
$ – Conference champion; ^ – NCAA Division I-AA playoff participant; Rankings from The Sports Network poll

The 1994 VMI Keydets football team was an American football team that represented the Virginia Military Institute (VMI) as a member of the Southern Conference (SoCon) during the 1994 NCAA Division I-AA football season. In their first year under head coach Bill Stewart, the team compiled an overall record of 1–10, with a mark of 1–7 in conference play, placing ninth in the SoCon. In December 1993 Stewart was introduced as the 26th all-time head coach of the Keydets after serving as an assistant at Air Force.

== Schedule ==
Date	Opponent	Site	Result	Attendance	Source
September 3	Richmond*	Alumni Memorial Field; Lexington, VA (rivalry)	L 31–34	7,866	
September 17	at East Tennessee State	Memorial Center; Johnson City, TN	L 21–31	5,901	
September 24	at No. 8 William & Mary*	Zable Stadium; Williamsburg, VA (rivalry)	L 7–45	14,014	
October 1	at Georgia Southern	Paulson Stadium; Statesboro, GA	L 0–49	13,072	
October 8	No. 1 Marshall	Alumni Memorial Field; Lexington, VA	L 7–49	9,538	
October 15	at Chattanooga	Chamberlain Field; Chattanooga, TN	L 14–49	2,415	
October 22	Furman	Alumni Memorial Field; Lexington, VA	L 11–28	6,736	
October 29	No. 21 Western Carolina	Alumni Memorial Field; Lexington, VA	L 7–33	5,129	
November 5	No. 10 James Madison*	Alumni Memorial Field; Lexington, VA	L 15–38	6,224	
November 12	vs. The Citadel	Foreman Field; Norfolk, VA (Oyster Bowl, rivalry)	L 15–58	15,520	
November 19	at No. 10 Appalachian State	Kidd Brewer Stadium; Boone, NC	W 26–23 ^{OT}	10,371	
*Non-conference game; Rankings from NCAA Division I-AA Football Committee Poll released prior to the game
