= 1994 South Carolina State Bulldogs football team =

American college football season

1994 South Carolina State Bulldogs football

Black college national champion MEAC champion

Heritage Bowl, W 31–27 vs. Grambling State
- Conference: Mid-Eastern Athletic Conference

Ranking
- Sports Network: No. 22
- Record: 10–2 (6–0 MEAC)
- Head coach: Willie Jeffries (12th season)
- Home stadium: Oliver C. Dawson Stadium; Johnson Hagood Stadium

1994 Mid-Eastern Athletic Conference football standings
	Conf.					Overall
Team	W		L		T	W		L		T
No. 22 South Carolina State $	6	–	0	–	0	10	–	2	–	0
Delaware State	4	–	2	–	0	7	–	4	–	0
North Carolina A&T	3	–	3	–	0	6	–	5	–	0
Bethune–Cookman	3	–	3	–	0	5	–	6	–	0
Florida A&M	2	–	4	–	0	6	–	5	–	0
Morgan State	2	–	4	–	0	3	–	8	–	0
Howard	1	–	5	–	0	4	–	7	–	0
$ – Conference champion; Rankings from The Sports Network poll

The 1994 South Carolina State Bulldogs football team represented South Carolina State University as a member of the Mid-Eastern Athletic Conference (MEAC) during the 1994 NCAA Division I-AA football season. Led by 12th-year head coach Willie Jeffries, the Bulldogs compiled an overall record of 10–2, with a mark of 6–0 in conference play, and finished as MEAC champion. At the conclusion of the season, the Bulldogs were also recognized as black college national champion.

== Schedule ==
Date	Opponent	Rank	Site	Result	Attendance	Source
September 3	Winston-Salem State*		Johnson Hagood Stadium; Charleston, SC	W 48–27	10,029	
September 10	at Furman*		Paladin Stadium; Greenville, SC	L 21–26	15,673	
September 17	at Charleston Southern*		Buccaneer Field; North Charleston, SC	W 37–0		
September 24	vs. Tennessee State*		Georgia Dome; Atlanta, GA (Atlanta Football Classic)	L 28–32	58,131	
October 1	vs. Jackson State*		Williams–Brice Stadium; Columbia, SC (Palmetto Classic)	W 26–22	21,596	
October 8	Morgan State		Oliver C. Dawson Stadium; Orangeburg, SC	W 49–7	8,520	
October 15	Bethune–Cookman		Oliver C. Dawson Stadium; Orangeburg, SC	W 28–26	16,993	
October 22	vs. Florida A&M		Florida Citrus Bowl; Orlando, FL	W 27–15	22,194	
October 29	at Delaware State		Alumni Stadium; Dover, DE	W 42–38		
November 5	Howard		Oliver C. Dawson Stadium; Orangeburg, SC	W 40–14		
November 19	at North Carolina A&T		Aggie Stadium; Greensboro, NC (rivalry)	W 46–24		
December 30	vs. No. 7 Grambling State*	No. 22	Georgia Dome; Atlanta, GA (Heritage Bowl)	W 31–27	22,179	
*Non-conference game; Rankings from The Sports Network Poll released prior to the game
