= 1994 Tennessee State Tigers football team =

American college football season

1994 Tennessee State Tigers football
- Conference: Ohio Valley Conference
- Record: 5–6 (4–4 OVC)
- Head coach: Bill Davis (2nd season)
- Home stadium: Hale Stadium; Vanderbilt Stadium

1994 Ohio Valley Conference football standings
| | Conf. | | | | | Overall |
| Team | W | | L | | T | W | | L | | T |
|---|---|---|---|---|---|---|---|---|---|---|
| No. 4 Eastern Kentucky $^ | 8 | – | 0 | – | 0 | 8 | – | 4 | – | 0 |
| No. 16 Middle Tennessee ^ | 7 | – | 1 | – | 0 | 8 | – | 3 | – | 1 |
| Southeast Missouri State | 5 | – | 3 | – | 0 | 7 | – | 5 | – | 0 |
| Tennessee State | 4 | – | 4 | – | 0 | 5 | – | 6 | – | 0 |
| Murray State | 4 | – | 4 | – | 0 | 5 | – | 6 | – | 0 |
| Tennessee Tech | 3 | – | 5 | – | 0 | 5 | – | 6 | – | 0 |
| Austin Peay | 3 | – | 5 | – | 0 | 4 | – | 7 | – | 0 |
| Tennessee–Martin | 2 | – | 6 | – | 0 | 5 | – | 6 | – | 0 |
| Morehead State | 0 | – | 8 | – | 0 | 0 | – | 11 | – | 0 |
$ – Conference champion; ^ – NCAA Division I-AA playoff participant; Rankings from The Sports Network poll

The 1994 Tennessee State Tigers football team represented Tennessee State University as a member of the Ohio Valley Conference (OVC) during the 1994 NCAA Division I-AA football season. Led by second-year head coach Bill Davis, the Tigers compiled an overall record of 5–6, with a conference record of 4–4, and finished tied for fourth in the OVC.

== Schedule ==
| Date | Opponent | Site | Result | Attendance | Source |
|---|---|---|---|---|---|
| September 3 | No. 16 Middle Tennessee | Hale Stadium; Nashville, TN | L 10–45 | 15,511 | |
| September 11 | vs. Jackson State* | Liberty Bowl Memorial Stadium; Memphis, TN (Southern Heritage Classic) | L 12–31 | 50,047 | |
| September 17 | at Morehead State | Jayne Stadium; Morehead, KY | W 48–10 | | |
| September 24 | vs. South Carolina State* | Georgia Dome; Atlanta, GA (Atlanta Football Classic) | W 32–28 | 58,131 | |
| October 1 | Florida A&M*^{†} | Vanderbilt Stadium; Nashville, TN | L 10–14 | 39,543 | |
| October 8 | at No. 13 Eastern Kentucky | Roy Kidd Stadium; Richmond, KY | L 17–28 | 15,200 | |
| October 15 | Austin Peay | Hale Stadium; Nashville, TN | W 26–22 | | |
| October 22 | Tennessee–Martin | Hale Stadium; Nashville, TN | W 20–3 | | |
| November 5 | at Tennessee Tech | Tucker Stadium; Cookeville, TN | L 20–28 | | |
| November 12 | at Murray State | Roy Stewart Stadium; Murray, KY | W 24–21 | 5,138 | |
| November 19 | Southeast Missouri State | Hale Stadium; Nashville, TN | L 12–17 | | |
*Non-conference game; ^{†}Homecoming; Rankings from NCAA Division I-AA Football Committee Poll released prior to the game
