= 1994 Bethune–Cookman Wildcats football team =

American college football season

1994 Bethune–Cookman Wildcats football
- Conference: Mid-Eastern Athletic Conference
- Record: 5–6 (3–3 MEAC)
- Head coach: Cy McClairen (13th season)
- Home stadium: Municipal Stadium

1994 Mid-Eastern Athletic Conference football standings
	Conf.					Overall
Team	W		L		T	W		L		T
No. 22 South Carolina State $	6	–	0	–	0	10	–	2	–	0
Delaware State	4	–	2	–	0	7	–	4	–	0
North Carolina A&T	3	–	3	–	0	6	–	5	–	0
Bethune–Cookman	3	–	3	–	0	5	–	6	–	0
Florida A&M	2	–	4	–	0	6	–	5	–	0
Morgan State	2	–	4	–	0	3	–	8	–	0
Howard	1	–	5	–	0	4	–	7	–	0
$ – Conference champion; Rankings from The Sports Network poll

The 1994 Bethune–Cookman Wildcats football team represented Bethune–Cookman College (now known as Bethune–Cookman University) as a member of the Mid-Eastern Athletic Conference (MEAC) during the 1994 NCAA Division I-AA football season. Led by 13th-year head coach Cy McClairen, the Wildcats compiled an overall record of 5–6, with a mark of 3–3 in conference play, and finished tied for third in the MEAC.

== Schedule ==
Date	Opponent	Site	Result	Attendance	Source
September 3	Johnson C. Smith*	Municipal Stadium; Daytona Beach, FL	W 24–7	2,500	
September 10	at Morgan State	Hughes Stadium; Baltimore, MD	W 41–0		
September 17	at No. 12 UCF*	Florida Citrus Bowl; Orlando, FL	L 17–48	22,049	
September 24	North Carolina Central*	Municipal Stadium; Daytona Beach, FL	L 5–24	6,528	
October 1	Delaware State	Municipal Stadium; Daytona Beach, FL	L 13–31	5,000	
October 8	at Howard	RFK Stadium; Washington, DC	L 19–21	13,150	
October 15	at South Carolina State	Oliver C. Dawson Stadium; Orangeburg, SC	L 26–28	16,993	
October 22	Albany State*	Municipal Stadium; Daytona Beach, FL	L 29–30	5,376	
October 29	at North Carolina A&T	Aggie Stadium; Greensboro, NC	W 28–24	28,620	
November 5	Knoxville*	Municipal Stadium; Daytona Beach, FL	W 31–24	8,257	
November 26	vs. Florida A&M	Tampa Stadium; Tampa, FL (Florida Classic)	W 27–24	36,813	
*Non-conference game; Rankings from The Sports Network Poll released prior to the game
