= 1994 Austin Peay Governors football team =

American college football season

1994 Austin Peay Governors football
- Conference: Ohio Valley Conference
- Record: 4–7 (3–5 OVC)
- Head coach: Roy Gregory (4th season)
- Home stadium: Governors Stadium

1994 Ohio Valley Conference football standings
	Conf.					Overall
Team	W		L		T	W		L		T
No. 4 Eastern Kentucky $^	8	–	0	–	0	8	–	4	–	0
No. 16 Middle Tennessee ^	7	–	1	–	0	8	–	3	–	1
Southeast Missouri State	5	–	3	–	0	7	–	5	–	0
Tennessee State	4	–	4	–	0	5	–	6	–	0
Murray State	4	–	4	–	0	5	–	6	–	0
Tennessee Tech	3	–	5	–	0	5	–	6	–	0
Austin Peay	3	–	5	–	0	4	–	7	–	0
Tennessee–Martin	2	–	6	–	0	5	–	6	–	0
Morehead State	0	–	8	–	0	0	–	11	–	0
$ – Conference champion; ^ – NCAA Division I-AA playoff participant; Rankings from The Sports Network poll

The 1994 Austin Peay Governors football team represented Austin Peay State University as a member of the Ohio Valley Conference (OVC) during the 1994 NCAA Division I-AA football season. Led by fourth-year head coach Roy Gregory, the Governors compiled an overall record of 4–7, with a mark of 3–5 in conference play, and finished tied for sixth in the OVC.

== Schedule ==
Date	Opponent	Site	Result	Attendance	Source
September 1	Kentucky Wesleyan*	Governors Stadium; Clarksville, TN	W 62–7		
September 17	at Western Kentucky*	L. T. Smith Stadium; Bowling Green, KY	L 3–21	10,100	
September 24	No. 19 Eastern Kentucky	Governors Stadium; Clarksville, TN	L 14–27		
October 1	at No. 11 Tennessee Tech	Tucker Stadium; Cookeville, TN	W 34–27	10,035	
October 8	Murray State	Governors Stadium; Clarksville, TN	L 14–29		
October 15	at Tennessee State	Hale Stadium; Nashville, TN	L 22–26		
October 22	Morehead State	Governors Stadium; Clarksville, TN	W 73–6		
October 29	at Southeast Missouri State	Houck Stadium; Cape Girardeau, MO	L 10–31		
November 5	No. 17 Middle Tennessee	Governors Stadium; Clarksville, TN	L 3–28	2,891	
November 12	at Samford*	Seibert Stadium; Homewood, AL	L 36–43		
November 19	at Tennessee–Martin	Pacer Stadium; Martin, TN	W 27–21		
*Non-conference game; Rankings from The Sports Network Poll released prior to the game
