= 1994 East Tennessee State Buccaneers football team =

American college football season

1994 East Tennessee State Buccaneers football
- Conference: Southern Conference
- Record: 6–5 (4–4 SoCon)
- Head coach: Mike Cavan (3rd season)
- Home stadium: Memorial Center

1994 Southern Conference football standings
	Conf.					Overall
Team	W		L		T	W		L		T
No. 2 Marshall $^	7	–	1	–	0	12	–	2	–	0
No. 17 Appalachian State ^	6	–	2	–	0	9	–	4	–	0
Georgia Southern	5	–	3	–	0	6	–	5	–	0
Western Carolina	5	–	3	–	0	6	–	5	–	0
The Citadel	4	–	4	–	0	6	–	5	–	0
East Tennessee State	4	–	4	–	0	6	–	5	–	0
Furman	2	–	6	–	0	3	–	8	–	0
Chattanooga	2	–	6	–	0	3	–	8	–	0
VMI	1	–	7	–	0	1	–	10	–	0
$ – Conference champion; ^ – NCAA Division I-AA playoff participant; Rankings from The Sports Network poll

The 1994 East Tennessee State Buccaneers football team was an American football team that represented East Tennessee State University as a member of the Southern Conference (SoCon) during the 1994 NCAA Division I-AA football season. Led by third-year head coach Mike Cavan, the Buccaneers compiled and overall record of 6–5, with a mark of 4–4 in conference play, and finished tied for fifth in the SoCon.

== Schedule ==
Date	Opponent	Site	Result	Attendance	Source
September 1	Catawba*	Memorial Center; Johnson City, TN	W 42–0		
September 10	at Morehead State*	Jayne Stadium; Morehead, KY	W 44–0	4,800	
September 17	VMI	Memorial Center; Johnson City, TN	W 31–21	5,901	
September 24	at No. 10 (I-A) Auburn*	Jordan-Hare Stadium; Auburn, AL	L 0–38	76,341	
October 1	Appalachian State	Memorial Center; Johnson City, TN	L 13–30	7,986	
October 8	at The Citadel	Johnson Hagood Stadium; Charleston, SC	W 56–34	15,703	
October 22	at Georgia Southern	Paulson Stadium; Statesboro, GA	L 23–24	15,894	
October 29	Furman	Memorial Center; Johnson City, TN	L 21–33	5,744	
November 5	No. 3 Marshall	Memorial Center; Johnson City, TN	L 12–42	9,417	
November 12	at Chattanooga	Chamberlain Field; Chattanooga, TN	W 30–13	5,412	
November 19	at No. 23 Western Carolina	E. J. Whitmire Stadium; Cullowhee, NC	W 34–31		
*Non-conference game; Rankings from The Sports Network Poll released prior to the game
