= 1994 Alabama A&M Bulldogs football team =

American college football season

1994 Alabama A&M Bulldogs football
- Conference: Southern Intercollegiate Athletic Conference
- Record: 4–7 (4–4 SIAC)
- Head coach: Reggie Oliver (1st season)
- Home stadium: Milton Frank Stadium

1994 Southern Intercollegiate Athletic Conference football standings
	Conf.					Overall
Team	W		L		T	W		L		T
No. 11 Albany State $^	8	–	0	–	0	10	–	2	–	0
Tuskegee	6	–	2	–	0	6	–	5	–	0
Savannah State	5	–	3	–	0	8	–	3	–	0
Fort Valley State	5	–	3	–	0	5	–	5	–	0
Alabama A&M	4	–	4	–	0	4	–	7	–	0
Clark Atlanta	2	–	5	–	0	3	–	7	–	0
Miles	2	–	5	–	0	2	–	6	–	1
Morehouse	2	–	6	–	0	3	–	7	–	0
Morris Brown	1	–	7	–	0	2	–	8	–	0
$ – Conference champion; ^ – NCAA Division II playoff participant; Rankings from NCAA Division II Football Committee poll

The 1994 Alabama A&M Bulldogs football team represented Alabama A&M University as a member of the Southern Intercollegiate Athletic Conference (SIAC) during the 1994 NCAA Division II football season. Led by Reggie Oliver in his first and only season as head coach, the Bulldogs compiled an overall record of 4–7 with a mark of 4–4 in conference play, placing fifth in the SIAC.

== Schedule ==
Date	Opponent	Site	Result	Attendance	Source
September 4	vs. Jackson State*	Legion Field; Birmingham, AL	L 24–34	42,773	
September 10	at No. 1 North Alabama*	Braly Municipal Stadium; Florence, AL	L 13–58	14,217	
September 17	Clark Atlanta	Milton Frank Stadium; Huntsville, AL	W 20–0	3,500	
September 24	Savannah State^{†}	Milton Frank Stadium; Huntsville, AL	L 0–9	10,990	
October 1	at Morris Brown	Georgia Dome; Atlanta, GA	L 13–24	11,225	
October 8	at Morehouse	B. T. Harvey Stadium; Atlanta, GA	W 34–15	5,775	
October 15	No. 18 Albany State	Milton Frank Stadium; Huntsville, AL	L 10–33	5,654	
October 22	at Fort Valley State	Wildcat Stadium; Fort Valley, GA	L 20–22	9,689	
October 29	vs. Alabama State*	Legion Field; Birmingham, AL (Magic City Classic)	L 0–26	55,000	
November 5	Miles	Milton Frank Stadium; Huntsville, AL	W 24–6	2,685	
November 12	at Tuskegee	Alumni Bowl; Tuskegee, AL	W 39–22	12,129	
*Non-conference game; ^{†}Homecoming; Rankings from NCAA Division II Football Committee Poll released prior to the game; Source:
