= 1994 Tennessee Tech Golden Eagles football team =

American college football season

1994 Tennessee Tech Golden Eagles football
- Conference: Ohio Valley Conference
- Record: 5–6 (3–5 OVC)
- Head coach: Jim Ragland (9th season)
- Home stadium: Tucker Stadium

1994 Ohio Valley Conference football standings
	Conf.					Overall
Team	W		L		T	W		L		T
No. 4 Eastern Kentucky $^	8	–	0	–	0	8	–	4	–	0
No. 16 Middle Tennessee ^	7	–	1	–	0	8	–	3	–	1
Southeast Missouri State	5	–	3	–	0	7	–	5	–	0
Tennessee State	4	–	4	–	0	5	–	6	–	0
Murray State	4	–	4	–	0	5	–	6	–	0
Tennessee Tech	3	–	5	–	0	5	–	6	–	0
Austin Peay	3	–	5	–	0	4	–	7	–	0
Tennessee–Martin	2	–	6	–	0	5	–	6	–	0
Morehead State	0	–	8	–	0	0	–	11	–	0
$ – Conference champion; ^ – NCAA Division I-AA playoff participant; Rankings from The Sports Network poll

The 1994 Tennessee Tech Golden Eagles football team represented Tennessee Technological University (commonly referred to as Tennessee Tech) as a member of the Ohio Valley Conference (OVC) during the 1994 NCAA Division I-AA football season. Led by ninth-year head coach Jim Ragland, the Golden Eagles compiled an overall record of 5–6, with a mark of 3–5 in conference play, and finished tied for sixth in the OVC.

== Schedule ==
Date	Opponent	Rank	Site	Result	Attendance	Source
September 1	Lock Haven*	No. 18	Tucker Stadium; Cookeville, TN	W 27–0		
September 10	at No. 1 Marshall*	No. 16	Marshall University Stadium; Huntington, WV	L 10–24		
September 17	Samford*	No. 18	Tucker Stadium; Cookeville, TN	W 20–7	3,200	
September 24	at Morehead State	No. 16	Jayne Stadium; Morehead, KY	W 56–14	1,800	
October 1	Austin Peay^{†}	No. 11	Tucker Stadium; Cookeville, TN	L 27–34	10,035	
October 8	Southeast Missouri State	No. 20	Tucker Stadium; Cookeville, TN	L 14–19		
October 15	at Tennessee–Martin		Pacer Stadium; Martin, TN	L 10–20	3,005	
October 22	No. 9 Eastern Kentucky		Tucker Stadium; Cookeville, TN	L 3–23		
October 29	at Murray State		Roy Stewart Stadium; Murray, KY	W 38–21	10,813	
November 5	Tennessee State		Tucker Stadium; Cookeville, TN	W 28–20		
November 19	at No. 18 Middle Tennessee		Johnny "Red" Floyd Stadium; Murfreesboro, TN	L 3–31	12,500	
*Non-conference game; ^{†}Homecoming; Rankings from The Sports Network Poll released prior to the game
