= 1994 Morehead State Eagles football team =

American college football season

1994 Morehead State Eagles football
- Conference: Ohio Valley Conference
- Record: 0–11 (0–8 OVC)
- Head coach: Matt Ballard (1st season)
- Home stadium: Jayne Stadium

1994 Ohio Valley Conference football standings
	Conf.					Overall
Team	W		L		T	W		L		T
No. 4 Eastern Kentucky $^	8	–	0	–	0	8	–	4	–	0
No. 16 Middle Tennessee ^	7	–	1	–	0	8	–	3	–	1
Southeast Missouri State	5	–	3	–	0	7	–	5	–	0
Tennessee State	4	–	4	–	0	5	–	6	–	0
Murray State	4	–	4	–	0	5	–	6	–	0
Tennessee Tech	3	–	5	–	0	5	–	6	–	0
Austin Peay	3	–	5	–	0	4	–	7	–	0
Tennessee–Martin	2	–	6	–	0	5	–	6	–	0
Morehead State	0	–	8	–	0	0	–	11	–	0
$ – Conference champion; ^ – NCAA Division I-AA playoff participant; Rankings from The Sports Network poll

The 1994 Morehead State Eagles football team represented Morehead State University as a member of the Ohio Valley Conference (OVC) during the 1994 NCAA Division I-AA football season. Led by first-year head coach Matt Ballard, the Eagles compiled an overall record of 0–11, with a mark of 0–8 in conference play, and finished ninth in the OVC.

== Schedule ==
Date	Opponent	Site	Result	Attendance	Source
September 3	at No. 1 Marshall*	Marshall University Stadium; Huntington, WV	L 7–71	23,855	
September 10	East Tennessee State*	Jayne Stadium; Morehead, KY	L 0–44	4,800	
September 17	Tennessee State	Jayne Stadium; Morehead, KY	L 10–48		
September 24	No. 16 Tennessee Tech	Jayne Stadium; Morehead, KY	L 14–56	1,800	
October 1	Southeast Missouri State	Jayne Stadium; Morehead, KY	L 20–45		
October 15	at No. 23 Middle Tennessee	Johnny "Red" Floyd Stadium; Murfreesboro, TN	L 6–63	6,500	
October 22	at Austin Peay	Governors Stadium; Clarksville, TN	L 6–73		
October 29	UAB*	Jayne Stadium; Morehead, KY	L 15–36	2,500	
November 5	Murray State	Jayne Stadium; Morehead, KY	L 6–45		
November 12	at Tennessee–Martin	Pacer Stadium; Martin, TN	L 7–21		
November 19	at No. 7 Eastern Kentucky	Roy Kidd Stadium; Richmond, KY (rivalry)	L 7–54	11,400	
*Non-conference game; Rankings from The Sports Network Poll released prior to the game
