= 1994 Eastern Kentucky Colonels football team =

American college football season

1994 Eastern Kentucky Colonels football

OVC champion

NCAA Division I-AA quarterfinal, L 15–18 at Youngstown State
- Conference: Ohio Valley Conference

Ranking
- Sports Network: No. 4
- Record: 10–3 (8–0 OVC)
- Head coach: Roy Kidd (31st season)
- Home stadium: Roy Kidd Stadium

1994 Ohio Valley Conference football standings
	Conf.					Overall
Team	W		L		T	W		L		T
No. 4 Eastern Kentucky $^	8	–	0	–	0	8	–	4	–	0
No. 16 Middle Tennessee ^	7	–	1	–	0	8	–	3	–	1
Southeast Missouri State	5	–	3	–	0	7	–	5	–	0
Tennessee State	4	–	4	–	0	5	–	6	–	0
Murray State	4	–	4	–	0	5	–	6	–	0
Tennessee Tech	3	–	5	–	0	5	–	6	–	0
Austin Peay	3	–	5	–	0	4	–	7	–	0
Tennessee–Martin	2	–	6	–	0	5	–	6	–	0
Morehead State	0	–	8	–	0	0	–	11	–	0
$ – Conference champion; ^ – NCAA Division I-AA playoff participant; Rankings from The Sports Network poll

The 1994 Eastern Kentucky Colonels football team represented Eastern Kentucky University as a member of the Ohio Valley Conference (OVC) during the 1994 NCAA Division I-AA football season. Led by 31st-year head coach Roy Kidd, the Colonels compiled an overall record of 10–3, with a mark of 8–0 in conference play, and finished as OVC champion. Eastern Kentucky advanced to the NCAA Division I-AA playoffs and were defeated by Youngstown State in the quarterfinals.

== Schedule ==
Date	Opponent	Rank	Site	Result	Attendance	Source
September 1	at Western Kentucky*	No. 12	L. T. Smith Stadium; Bowling Green, KY (rivalry)	L 21–24	12,300	
September 10	Samford*	No. 21	Roy Kidd Stadium; Richmond, KY	W 50–16	14,600	
September 17	at No. 4 Youngstown State*	No. 14	Stambaugh Stadium; Youngstown, OH	L 6–13		
September 24	at Austin Peay	No. 19	Governors Stadium; Clarksville, TN	W 27–14		
October 1	at No. 20 Middle Tennessee	No. 17	Johnny "Red" Floyd Stadium; Murfreesboro, TN	W 28–27	14,600	
October 8	Tennessee State	No. 13	Roy Kidd Stadium; Richmond, KY	W 28–17	15,200	
October 15	Murray State	No. 12	Roy Kidd Stadium; Richmond, KY	W 49–13		
October 22	at Tennessee Tech	No. 9	Tucker Stadium; Cookeville, TN	W 23–3		
October 29	at Tennessee–Martin	No. 9	Pacer Stadium; Martin, TN	W 26–7		
November 5	Southeast Missouri State	No. 9	Roy Kidd Stadium; Richmond, KY	W 34–6		
November 19	Morehead State	No. 7	Roy Kidd Stadium; Richmond, KY (rivalry)	W 54–7	11,400	
November 26	No. 9 Boston University*	No. 4	Roy Kidd Stadium; Richmond, KY (NCAA Division I-AA first round)	W 30–23		
December 3	at No. 1 Youngstown State*	No. 4	Stambaugh Stadium; Youngstown, OH (NCAA Division I-AA quarterfinal)	L 15–18	16,023	
*Non-conference game; Rankings from The Sports Network Poll released prior to the game
