= 1994 Florida A&M Rattlers football team =

American college football season

1994 Florida A&M Rattlers football
- Conference: Mid-Eastern Athletic Conference
- Record: 6–5 (2–4 MEAC)
- Head coach: Billy Joe (1st season)
- Offensive scheme: Gulf Coast
- Home stadium: Bragg Memorial Stadium

1994 Mid-Eastern Athletic Conference football standings
	Conf.					Overall
Team	W		L		T	W		L		T
No. 22 South Carolina State $	6	–	0	–	0	10	–	2	–	0
Delaware State	4	–	2	–	0	7	–	4	–	0
North Carolina A&T	3	–	3	–	0	6	–	5	–	0
Bethune–Cookman	3	–	3	–	0	5	–	6	–	0
Florida A&M	2	–	4	–	0	6	–	5	–	0
Morgan State	2	–	4	–	0	3	–	8	–	0
Howard	1	–	5	–	0	4	–	7	–	0
$ – Conference champion; Rankings from The Sports Network poll

The 1994 Florida A&M Rattlers football team represented Florida A&M University as a member of the Mid-Eastern Athletic Conference (MEAC) during the 1994 NCAA Division I-AA football season. Led by first-year head coach Billy Joe, the Rattlers compiled an overall record of 6–5, with a mark of 2–4 in conference play, and finished tied for fifth in the MEAC.

== Schedule ==
Date	Opponent	Site	Result	Attendance	Source
September 3	Tuskegee*	Bragg Memorial Stadium; Tallahassee, FL	W 20–8	16,250	
September 17	at Jackson State*	Mississippi Veterans Memorial Stadium; Jackson, MS	L 34–35	20,105	
September 24	Howard	Bragg Memorial Stadium; Tallahassee, FL	W 29–2	19,945	
October 1	at Tennessee State*	Vanderbilt Stadium; Nashville, TN	W 14–10	39,543	
October 8	North Carolina A&T	Bragg Memorial Stadium; Tallahassee, FL	L 22–23	14,226	
October 15	vs. Delaware State	Veterans Stadium; Philadelphia, PA (Philadelphia Classic)	W 25–18	26,864	
October 22	vs. South Carolina State	Florida Citrus Bowl; Orlando, FL	L 15–27	22,194	
October 29	Morgan State	Bragg Memorial Stadium; Tallahassee, FL	L 20–24		
November 5	at Southern*	A. W. Mumford Stadium; Baton Rouge, LA	W 16–14	22,303	
November 12	vs. No. 3 Grambling State*	Joe Robbie Stadium; Miami Gardens, FL (Orange Blossom Classic)	W 13–0	21,755	
November 26	vs. Bethune–Cookman	Tampa Stadium; Tampa, FL (Florida Classic)	L 24–27	36,813	
*Non-conference game; Rankings from The Sports Network Poll released prior to the game
