= 1994 North Carolina A&T Aggies football team =

American college football season

1994 North Carolina A&T Aggies football
- Conference: Mid-Eastern Athletic Conference
- Record: 6–5 (3–3 MEAC)
- Head coach: Bill Hayes (7th season)
- Home stadium: Aggie Stadium

1994 Mid-Eastern Athletic Conference football standings
	Conf.					Overall
Team	W		L		T	W		L		T
No. 22 South Carolina State $	6	–	0	–	0	10	–	2	–	0
Delaware State	4	–	2	–	0	7	–	4	–	0
North Carolina A&T	3	–	3	–	0	6	–	5	–	0
Bethune–Cookman	3	–	3	–	0	5	–	6	–	0
Florida A&M	2	–	4	–	0	6	–	5	–	0
Morgan State	2	–	4	–	0	3	–	8	–	0
Howard	1	–	5	–	0	4	–	7	–	0
$ – Conference champion; Rankings from The Sports Network poll

The 1994 North Carolina A&T Aggies football team represented North Carolina A&T State University as a member of the Mid-Eastern Athletic Conference (MEAC) during the 1994 NCAA Division I-AA football season. Led by seventh-year head coach Bill Hayes, the Aggies compiled an overall record of 6–5, with a mark of 3–3 in conference play, and finished third in the MEAC.

== Schedule ==
Date	Opponent	Site	Result	Attendance	Source
September 3	at North Carolina Central*	Carter–Finley Stadium; Raleigh, NC (rivalry)	W 38–9	32,437	
September 10	Winston–Salem State*	Aggie Stadium; Greensboro, NC (rivalry)	W 53–7		
September 17	at Appalachian State*	Kidd Brewer Stadium; Boone, NC	L 0–45	11,612	
September 24	Jacksonville State*	Aggie Stadium; Greensboro, NC	L 17–24	7,512	
October 1	vs. No. 10 Southern*	Hoosier Dome; Indianapolis, IN (Circle City Classic)	W 22–21	61,803	
October 8	at Florida A&M	Bragg Memorial Stadium; Tallahassee, FL	W 23–22	14,226	
October 15	Morgan State	Aggie Stadium; Greensboro, NC	W 26–16		
October 22	at Howard	William H. Greene Stadium; Washington, DC	W 24–20	19,166	
October 29	Bethune–Cookman	Aggie Stadium; Greensboro, NC	L 24–28	28,620	
November 5	at Delaware State	Alumni Stadium; Dover, DE	L 10–31	3,641	
November 19	No. 25 South Carolina State	Aggie Stadium; Greensboro, NC (rivalry)	L 24–46		
*Non-conference game; Rankings from The Sports Network Poll released prior to the game
