= 1994 Georgia Southern Eagles football team =

American college football season

1994 Georgia Southern Eagles football
- Conference: Southern Conference
- Record: 6–5 (5–3 SoCon)
- Head coach: Tim Stowers (5th season)
- Defensive coordinator: Tommy Spangler (5th season)
- Home stadium: Paulson Stadium

1994 Southern Conference football standings
	Conf.					Overall
Team	W		L		T	W		L		T
No. 2 Marshall $^	7	–	1	–	0	12	–	2	–	0
No. 17 Appalachian State ^	6	–	2	–	0	9	–	4	–	0
Georgia Southern	5	–	3	–	0	6	–	5	–	0
Western Carolina	5	–	3	–	0	6	–	5	–	0
The Citadel	4	–	4	–	0	6	–	5	–	0
East Tennessee State	4	–	4	–	0	6	–	5	–	0
Furman	2	–	6	–	0	3	–	8	–	0
Chattanooga	2	–	6	–	0	3	–	8	–	0
VMI	1	–	7	–	0	1	–	10	–	0
$ – Conference champion; ^ – NCAA Division I-AA playoff participant; Rankings from The Sports Network poll

The 1994 Georgia Southern Eagles football team represented Georgia Southern University as a member of the Southern Conference (SoCon) during the 1994 NCAA Division I-AA football season. Led by fifth-year head coach Tim Stowers, Georgia Southern compiled an overall record of 6–5 with a conference mark of 5–3, tying for third place in the SoCon. The Eagles played their home games at Paulson Stadium in Statesboro, Georgia.

== Schedule ==
Date	Opponent	Rank	Site	Result	Attendance	Source
September 3	at No. 6 (I-A) Miami (FL)*	No. 2	Miami Orange Bowl; Miami, FL	L 0–56	54,058	
September 10	West Georgia*	No. 9	Paulson Stadium; Statesboro, GA	L 14–15	12,159	
September 17	No. 1 Marshall	No. 21	Paulson Stadium; Statesboro, GA	L 7–37	14,411	
September 24	at Chattanooga		Chamberlain Field; Chattanooga, TN	W 56–20	7,324	
October 1	VMI		Paulson Stadium; Statesboro, GA	W 49–0	13,072	
October 8	at No. 17 Western Carolina		E. J. Whitmire Stadium; Cullowhee, NC	L 31–35	10,212	
October 15	No. 18 Appalachian State		Paulson Stadium; Statesboro, GA (rivalry)	W 34–31	12,552	
October 22	East Tennessee State		Paulson Stadium; Statesboro, GA	W 24–23	15,894	
November 5	at Furman	No. 25	Paladin Stadium; Greenville, SC	W 31–26	12,161	
November 12	Glenville State*	No. 24	Paulson Stadium; Statesboro, GA	W 66–13	13,197	
November 19	at The Citadel	No. 24	Johnson Hagood Stadium; Charleston, SC	L 15–17	18,559	
*Non-conference game; Rankings from The Sports Network Poll released prior to the game
