= 1994 Appalachian State Mountaineers football team =

American college football season

1994 Appalachian State Mountaineers football

NCAA Division I-AA Quarterfinal, L 14–17 at Boise State
- Conference: Southern Conference

Ranking
- Sports Network: No. 17
- Record: 9–4 (6–2 SoCon)
- Head coach: Jerry Moore (6th season)
- Home stadium: Kidd Brewer Stadium

1994 Southern Conference football standings
	Conf.					Overall
Team	W		L		T	W		L		T
No. 2 Marshall $^	7	–	1	–	0	12	–	2	–	0
No. 17 Appalachian State ^	6	–	2	–	0	9	–	4	–	0
Georgia Southern	5	–	3	–	0	6	–	5	–	0
Western Carolina	5	–	3	–	0	6	–	5	–	0
The Citadel	4	–	4	–	0	6	–	5	–	0
East Tennessee State	4	–	4	–	0	6	–	5	–	0
Furman	2	–	6	–	0	3	–	8	–	0
Chattanooga	2	–	6	–	0	3	–	8	–	0
VMI	1	–	7	–	0	1	–	10	–	0
$ – Conference champion; ^ – NCAA Division I-AA playoff participant; Rankings from The Sports Network poll

The 1994 Appalachian State Mountaineers football team was an American football team that represented Appalachian State University as a member of the Southern Conference (SoCon) during the 1994 NCAA Division I-AA football season. In their sixth year under head coach Jerry Moore, the Mountaineers compiled an overall record of 9–4 with a conference mark of 6–2. Appalachian State advanced to the NCAA Division I-AA Football Championship playoffs, where they defeated New Hampshire in the first round and lost to Boise State in the quarterfinals.

== Schedule ==
Date	Opponent	Rank	Site	Result	Attendance	Source
September 10	at Wake Forest*		Groves Stadium; Winston-Salem, NC	L 10–12	25,067	
September 17	North Carolina A&T*		Kidd Brewer Stadium; Boone, NC	W 45–0	11,612	
September 24	The Citadel		Kidd Brewer Stadium; Boone, NC	W 56–14	14,631	
October 1	at East Tennessee State		Memorial Center; Johnson City, TN	W 30–13	7,986	
October 8	Furman	No. 20	Kidd Brewer Stadium; Boone, NC	W 30–6	13,661	
October 15	at Georgia Southern	No. 18	Paulson Stadium; Statesboro, GA (rivalry)	L 31–34	12,552	
October 22	No. 1 Marshall	No. 24	Kidd Brewer Stadium; Boone, NC (rivalry)	W 24–14	19,781	
October 29	at Chattanooga	No. 15	Chamberlain Field; Chattanooga, TN	W 30–16	5,929	
November 5	Liberty*	No. 13	Kidd Brewer Stadium; Boone, NC	W 41–40	19,468	
November 12	at No. 18 Western Carolina	No. 12	Whitmire Stadium; Cullowhee, NC (rivalry)	W 12–7	15,247	
November 19	VMI	No. 10	Kidd Brewer Stadium; Boone, NC	L 23–26 ^{OT}	10,371	
November 26	at No. 12 New Hampshire*	No. 17	Cowell Stadium; Durham, NH (NCAA Division I-AA First Round)	W 17–10 ^{OT}	7,329	
December 3	at No. 3 Boise State*	No. 17	Bronco Stadium; Boise, ID (NCAA Division I-AA Quarterfinal)	L 14–17	15,302	
*Non-conference game; Rankings from The Sports Network Poll released prior to the game
