= 1994 Grambling State Tigers football team =

American college football season

1994 Grambling State Tigers football

SWAC co-champion

Heritage Bowl, L 27–31 vs. South Carolina State
- Conference: Southwestern Athletic Conference

Ranking
- Sports Network: No. 7
- Record: 9–3 (6–1 SWAC)
- Head coach: Eddie Robinson (52nd season)
- Defensive coordinator: George Small (1st season)
- Home stadium: Eddie G. Robinson Memorial Stadium

1994 Southwestern Athletic Conference football standings
| | Conf. | | | | | Overall |
| Team | W | | L | | T | W | | L | | T |
|---|---|---|---|---|---|---|---|---|---|---|
| No. 7 Grambling State + | 6 | – | 1 | – | 0 | 9 | – | 3 | – | 0 |
| No. 15 Alcorn State +^ | 6 | – | 1 | – | 0 | 8 | – | 3 | – | 1 |
| Southern | 5 | – | 2 | – | 0 | 6 | – | 5 | – | 0 |
| Jackson State | 4 | – | 3 | – | 0 | 7 | – | 4 | – | 0 |
| Alabama State | 3 | – | 4 | – | 0 | 6 | – | 5 | – | 0 |
| Mississippi Valley State | 2 | – | 5 | – | 0 | 4 | – | 6 | – | 0 |
| Texas Southern | 2 | – | 5 | – | 0 | 4 | – | 7 | – | 0 |
| Prairie View A&M | 0 | – | 7 | – | 0 | 0 | – | 11 | – | 0 |
+ – Conference co-champions; ^ – NCAA Division I-AA playoff participant; Rankings from The Sports Network poll

The 1994 Grambling State Tigers football team represented Grambling State University as a member of the Southwestern Athletic Conference (SWAC) during the 1994 NCAA Division I-AA football season. The Tigers were led by head coach Eddie Robinson in his 52nd year and finished the season with a record of nine wins and three losses (9–3, 6–1 SWAC). The Tigers offense scored 479 points while the defense allowed only 262 points. This was the final winning season during Eddie Robinson's tenure as head coach at Grambling.

== Schedule ==
| Date | Opponent | Rank | Site | Result | Attendance | Source |
|---|---|---|---|---|---|---|
| September 3 | Alcorn State | | Eddie G. Robinson Memorial Stadium; Grambling, LA | W 62–56 | 25,347 | |
| September 17 | at Morgan State* | No. 22 | Memorial Stadium; Baltimore, MD | W 87–12 | 23,289 | |
| September 24 | vs. Hampton* | No. 17 | Giants Stadium; East Rutherford, NJ (Whitney Young Memorial Classic) | W 32–29 | 64,315 | |
| October 1 | vs. Prairie View A&M | No. 12 | Cotton Bowl; Dallas, TX (rivalry) | W 66–0 | 66,822 | |
| October 8 | at Mississippi Valley State | No. 9 | Magnolia Stadium; Itta Bena, MS | W 24–9 | 7,320 | |
| October 15 | vs. Arkansas–Pine Bluff* | No. 8 | Independence Stadium; Shreveport. LA (Red River Classic) | W 44–17 | 15,703 | |
| October 22 | Jackson State | No. 6 | Eddie G. Robinson Memorial Stadium; Grambling, LA | W 28–17 | 20,344 | |
| October 29 | at Texas Southern | No. 6 | Houston Astrodome; Houston, TX | W 51–20 | | |
| November 5 | Alabama State^{†} | No. 5 | Eddie G. Robinson Memorial Stadium; Grambling, LA | W 51–24 | 19,698 | |
| November 12 | vs. Florida A&M* | No. 3 | Joe Robbie Stadium; Miami Gardens, FL (Orange Blossom Classic) | L 0–13 | 21,755 | |
| November 26 | vs. Southern | No. 7 | Louisiana Superdome; New Orleans, LA (Bayou Classic) | L 7–34 | 66,641 | |
| December 30 | vs. No. 22 South Carolina State* | No. 7 | Georgia Dome; Atlanta, GA (Heritage Bowl) | L 27–31 | 22,179 | |
*Non-conference game; ^{†}Homecoming; Rankings from The Sports Network Poll released prior to the game

== Team players drafted into the NFL ==
| Player | Position | Round | Pick | NFL club |
|---|---|---|---|---|
| Roderick Mullen | Defensive Back | 5 | 153 | New York Giants |
| Curtis Ceaser | Wide Receiver | 7 | 217 | New York Jets |
