= 1994 Tennessee–Martin Pacers football team =

American college football season

1994 Tennessee–Martin Pacers football
- Conference: Ohio Valley Conference
- Record: 5–6 (2–6 OVC)
- Head coach: Don McLeary (9th season)
- Home stadium: Pacer Stadium

1994 Ohio Valley Conference football standings
	Conf.					Overall
Team	W		L		T	W		L		T
No. 4 Eastern Kentucky $^	8	–	0	–	0	8	–	4	–	0
No. 16 Middle Tennessee ^	7	–	1	–	0	8	–	3	–	1
Southeast Missouri State	5	–	3	–	0	7	–	5	–	0
Tennessee State	4	–	4	–	0	5	–	6	–	0
Murray State	4	–	4	–	0	5	–	6	–	0
Tennessee Tech	3	–	5	–	0	5	–	6	–	0
Austin Peay	3	–	5	–	0	4	–	7	–	0
Tennessee–Martin	2	–	6	–	0	5	–	6	–	0
Morehead State	0	–	8	–	0	0	–	11	–	0
$ – Conference champion; ^ – NCAA Division I-AA playoff participant; Rankings from The Sports Network poll

The 1994 Tennessee–Martin Pacers football team represented the University of Tennessee at Martin as a member of the Ohio Valley Conference (OVC) during the 1994 NCAA Division I-AA football season. Led by ninth-year head coach Don McLeary, the Pacers compiled an overall record of 5–6, with a mark of 2–6 in conference play, and finished eighth in the OVC.

== Schedule ==
Date	Opponent	Site	Result	Attendance	Source
September 3	at Southern Illinois*	McAndrew Stadium; Carbondale, IL	W 35–26	11,800	
September 17	Lane*	Pacer Stadium; Martin, TN	W 14–6		
September 24	at Southeast Missouri State	Houck Stadium; Cape Girardeau, MO	L 0–10		
October 1	at Murray State	Roy Stewart Stadium; Murray, KY	L 24–28	4,910	
October 8	at No. 25 Middle Tennessee	Johnny "Red" Floyd Stadium; Murfreesboro, TN	L 7–38	13,000	
October 15	Tennessee Tech	Pacer Stadium; Martin, TN	W 20–10	3,005	
October 22	at Tennessee State	Hale Stadium; Nashville, TN	L 3–20		
October 29	No. 9 Eastern Kentucky	Pacer Stadium; Martin, TN	L 7–26		
November 5	Charleston Southern*	Pacer Stadium; Martin, TN	W 42–14	2,289	
November 12	Morehead State	Pacer Stadium; Martin, TN	W 21–7		
November 19	Austin Peay	Pacer Stadium; Martin, TN	L 21–27		
*Non-conference game; Rankings from The Sports Network Poll released prior to the game
