= 1994 Morgan State Bears football team =

American college football season

1994 Morgan State Bears football
- Conference: Mid-Eastern Athletic Conference
- Record: 3–8 (2–4 MEAC)
- Head coach: Ricky Diggs (4th season)
- Home stadium: Hughes Stadium; Memorial Stadium

1994 Mid-Eastern Athletic Conference football standings
	Conf.					Overall
Team	W		L		T	W		L		T
No. 22 South Carolina State $	6	–	0	–	0	10	–	2	–	0
Delaware State	4	–	2	–	0	7	–	4	–	0
North Carolina A&T	3	–	3	–	0	6	–	5	–	0
Bethune–Cookman	3	–	3	–	0	5	–	6	–	0
Florida A&M	2	–	4	–	0	6	–	5	–	0
Morgan State	2	–	4	–	0	3	–	8	–	0
Howard	1	–	5	–	0	4	–	7	–	0
$ – Conference champion; Rankings from The Sports Network poll

The 1994 Morgan State Bears football team represented Morgan State University as a member of the Mid-Eastern Athletic Conference (MEAC) during the 1994 NCAA Division I-AA football season. Led by fourth-year head coach Ricky Diggs, the Bears compiled an overall record of 3–8, with a mark of 2–4 in conference play, and finished tied for fifth in the MEAC.

== Schedule ==
Date	Opponent	Site	Result	Attendance	Source
September 10	Bethune–Cookman	Hughes Stadium; Baltimore, MD	L 0–41		
September 17	No. 22 Grambling State*	Memorial Stadium; Baltimore, MD	L 12–87	23,289	
September 24	Knoxville*	Hughes Stadium; Baltimore, MD	L 13–22		
October 1	at Charleston Southern*	Buccaneer Field; North Charleston, SC	W 31–29	1,406	
October 8	at South Carolina State	Oliver C. Dawson Stadium; Orangeburg, SC	L 7–49	8,520	
October 15	at North Carolina A&T	Aggie Stadium; Greensboro, NC	L 16–26		
October 22	Delaware State	Hughes Stadium; Baltimore, MD	L 21–50	14,876	
October 29	at Florida A&M	Bragg Memorial Stadium; Tallahassee, FL	W 24–20		
November 5	Samford*	Hughes Stadium; Baltimore, MD	L 34–40		
November 12	at Howard	William H. Greene Stadium; Washington, DC (rivalry)	W 17–14		
November 19	at Towson State*	Minnegan Stadium; Towson, MD (rivalry)	L 7–42	2,763	
*Non-conference game; Rankings from The Sports Network Poll released prior to the game
