= Reggie Oliver (American football) =

American football player and coach (1951–2018)

Biographical details
- Born: October 20, 1951; Tuscaloosa, Alabama, U.S.
- Died: August 14, 2018 (aged 66); Huntsville, Alabama, U.S.

Playing career
- 1970–1973: Marshall
- 1974: Jacksonville Sharks
- Position: Quarterback

Coaching career (HC unless noted)
- 1979–1983: Marshall (assistant)
- 1994: Alabama A&M

Head coaching record
- Overall: 4–7

Reginald M. Oliver (October 20, 1951 – August 14, 2018) was an American football player and coach.

Oliver was a college football quarterback at Marshall University in Huntington, West Virginia from 1970 to 1973. He was one of a small handful of members of the 1970 team who were not on the plane crash that killed all aboard. Oliver was portrayed by actor Arlen Escarpeta in the 2006 film We Are Marshall.

Oliver served as the head football coach at Alabama A&M University in 1994, compiling a record of 4–7.

== Head coaching record ==
Year	Team	Overall	Conference	Standing	Bowl/playoffs
Alabama A&M Bulldogs (Southern Intercollegiate Athletic Conference) (1994)
1994	Alabama A&M	4–7	4–4	5th	
Alabama A&M:		4–7	4–4		
Total:		4–7			
