= 1994 Mississippi Valley State Delta Devils football team =

American college football season

1994 Mississippi Valley State Delta Devils football
- Conference: Southwestern Athletic Conference
- Record: 3–7 (2–5 SWAC)
- Head coach: Larry Dorsey (5th season)
- Home stadium: Magnolia Stadium

1994 Southwestern Athletic Conference football standings
	Conf.					Overall
Team	W		L		T	W		L		T
No. 7 Grambling State +	6	–	1	–	0	9	–	3	–	0
No. 15 Alcorn State +^	6	–	1	–	0	8	–	3	–	1
Southern	5	–	2	–	0	6	–	5	–	0
Jackson State	4	–	3	–	0	7	–	4	–	0
Alabama State	3	–	4	–	0	6	–	5	–	0
Mississippi Valley State	2	–	5	–	0	4	–	6	–	0
Texas Southern	2	–	5	–	0	4	–	7	–	0
Prairie View A&M	0	–	7	–	0	0	–	11	–	0
+ – Conference co-champions; ^ – NCAA Division I-AA playoff participant; Rankings from The Sports Network poll

The 1994 Mississippi Valley State Delta Devils football team represented Mississippi Valley State University as a member of the Southwestern Athletic Conference (SWAC) during the 1994 NCAA Division I-AA football season. Led by fifth-year head coach Larry Dorsey, the Delta Devils compiled an overall record of 3–7, with a conference record of 2–5, and finished tied for sixth in the SWAC.

== Schedule ==
Date	Opponent	Site	Result	Attendance	Source
September 3	vs. Howard*	Busch Memorial Stadium; St. Louis, MO (Gateway Classic)	L 25–27	22,994	
September 10	vs. Lane*	Tupelo H.S. Stadium; Tupelo, MS	W 23–14	4,000	
September 17	at No. 10 Southern	A. W. Mumford Stadium; Baton Rouge, LA	L 0–19	19,496	
September 24	at Jackson State	Mississippi Veterans Memorial Stadium; Jackson, MS	W 18–16	38,500	
October 1	vs. No. 22 Alcorn State	Mississippi Veterans Memorial Stadium; Jackson, MS	L 24–49	34,982	
October 8	No. 9 Grambling State	Magnolia Stadium; Itta Bena, MS	L 9–24	7,320	
October 15	at UAB*	Legion Field; Birmingham, AL	L 14–24	20,237	
October 22	at Texas Southern	Durley Stadium; Houston, TX	L 24–30		
October 29	Prairie View A&M	Magnolia Stadium; Itta Bena, MS	W 21–10		
November 12	at Alabama State	Cramton Bowl; Montgomery, AL	L 24–33	7,000	
*Non-conference game; Rankings from NCAA Division I-AA Football Committee Poll released prior to the game
