= 1994 Alabama State Hornets football team =

American college football season

1994 Alabama State Hornets football
- Conference: Southwestern Athletic Conference
- Record: 6–5 (3–4 SWAC)
- Head coach: Houston Markham (8th season)
- Home stadium: Cramton Bowl

1994 Southwestern Athletic Conference football standings
	Conf.					Overall
Team	W		L		T	W		L		T
No. 7 Grambling State +	6	–	1	–	0	9	–	3	–	0
No. 15 Alcorn State +^	6	–	1	–	0	8	–	3	–	1
Southern	5	–	2	–	0	6	–	5	–	0
Jackson State	4	–	3	–	0	7	–	4	–	0
Alabama State	3	–	4	–	0	6	–	5	–	0
Mississippi Valley State	2	–	5	–	0	4	–	6	–	0
Texas Southern	2	–	5	–	0	4	–	7	–	0
Prairie View A&M	0	–	7	–	0	0	–	11	–	0
+ – Conference co-champions; ^ – NCAA Division I-AA playoff participant; Rankings from The Sports Network poll

The 1994 Alabama State Hornets football team represented Alabama State University as a member of the Southwestern Athletic Conference (SWAC) during the 1994 NCAA Division I-AA football season. Led by eighth-year head coach Houston Markham, the Hornets compiled an overall record of 6–5, with a mark of 3–4 in conference play, and finished fifth in the SWAC.

== Schedule ==
Date	Opponent	Site	Result	Attendance	Source
September 3	UAB*	Cramton Bowl; Montgomery, AL	W 27–24	14,750	
September 10	at Southern	A. W. Mumford Stadium; Baton Rouge, LA	L 0–31		
September 17	at No. 15 Alcorn State	Jack Spinks Stadium; Lorman, MS	L 7–39		
September 24	at No. 4 Troy State*	Veterans Memorial Stadium; Troy, AL	L 27–49		
October 8	vs. Jackson State	Soldier Field; Chicago, IL (Chicago Classic)	L 6–24	44,366	
October 15	vs. Texas Southern	Ladd Stadium; Mobile, AL (Gulf Coast Classic)	W 28–14		
October 22	at Prairie View A&M	Edward L. Blackshear Field; Prairie View, TX	W 54–13		
October 29	vs. Alabama A&M*	Legion Field; Birmingham, AL (Magic City Classic)	W 26–0	55,000	
November 5	at No. 5 Grambling State	Eddie G. Robinson Memorial Stadium; Grambling, LA	L 24–51	19,698	
November 12	Mississippi Valley State	Cramton Bowl; Montgomery, AL	W 33–24		
November 24	Tuskegee*	Cramton Bowl; Montgomery, AL (Turkey Day Classic)	W 37–35		
*Non-conference game; Rankings from NCAA Division I-AA Football Committee Poll released prior to the game
