= 1994 Western Carolina Catamounts football team =

American college football season

1994 Western Carolina Catamounts football
- Conference: Southern Conference
- Record: 6–5 (5–3 SoCon)
- Head coach: Steve Hodgin (5th season)
- Home stadium: E. J. Whitmire Stadium

1994 Southern Conference football standings
	Conf.					Overall
Team	W		L		T	W		L		T
No. 2 Marshall $^	7	–	1	–	0	12	–	2	–	0
No. 17 Appalachian State ^	6	–	2	–	0	9	–	4	–	0
Georgia Southern	5	–	3	–	0	6	–	5	–	0
Western Carolina	5	–	3	–	0	6	–	5	–	0
The Citadel	4	–	4	–	0	6	–	5	–	0
East Tennessee State	4	–	4	–	0	6	–	5	–	0
Furman	2	–	6	–	0	3	–	8	–	0
Chattanooga	2	–	6	–	0	3	–	8	–	0
VMI	1	–	7	–	0	1	–	10	–	0
$ – Conference champion; ^ – NCAA Division I-AA playoff participant; Rankings from The Sports Network poll

The 1994 Western Carolina Catamounts team was an American football team that represented Western Carolina University as a member of the Southern Conference (SoCon) during the 1994 NCAA Division I-AA football season. In their fifth year under head coach Steve Hodgin, the team compiled an overall record of 6–5, with a mark of 5–3 in conference play, and finished tied for third in the SoCon.

== Schedule ==
Date	Opponent	Rank	Site	Result	Attendance	Source
September 1	Lenoir–Rhyne*	No. 17	E. J. Whitmire Stadium; Cullowhee, NC	W 23–14		
September 10	at Georgia Tech*	No. 17	Bobby Dodd Stadium; Atlanta, GA	L 26–45	40,012	
September 17	at The Citadel	No. 17	Johnson Hagood Stadium; Charleston, SC	W 42–38	14,176	
September 24	at No. 24 (I-A) NC State*	No. 14	Carter–Finley Stadium; Raleigh, NC	L 13–38	43,000	
October 1	at Furman	No. 14	Paladin Stadium; Greenville, SC	W 35–24	12,125	
October 8	Georgia Southern	No. 17	E. J. Whitmire Stadium; Cullowhee, NC	W 35–31	10,212	
October 15	at No. 1 Marshall	No. 16	Marshall University Stadium; Huntington, WV	L 14–38	24,968	
October 22	Chattanooga	No. 23	E. J. Whitmire Stadium; Cullowhee, NC	W 53–15	11,337	
October 29	at VMI	No. 21	Alumni Memorial Field; Lexington, VA	W 33–7	5,129	
November 12	No. 12 Appalachian State	No. 18	E. J. Whitmire Stadium; Cullowhee, NC (rivalry)	L 7–12	15,247	
November 19	East Tennessee State	No. 23	E. J. Whitmire Stadium; Cullowhee, NC	L 31–34		
*Non-conference game; Rankings from The Sports Network Poll released prior to the game
