= Cy McClairen =

American football player and coach (1931–2020)

Jack McClairen
No. 87
- Position: End

Personal information
- Born: March 2, 1931; Panama City, Florida, U.S.
- Died: December 28, 2020 (aged 89); Daytona Beach, Florida, U.S.
- Listed height: 6 ft 4 in (1.93 m)
- Listed weight: 213 lb (97 kg)

Career information
- High school: Rosenwald (Panama City)
- College: Bethune–Cookman (1949–1952)
- NFL draft: 1953: 26th round, 306th overall pick

Career history

Playing
- Pittsburgh Steelers (1955–1960)

Coaching
- Bethune–Cookman (1961–1972, 1994–1996)

Operations
- Bethune–Cookman (?–1973) Athletic director

Awards and highlights
- Pro Bowl (1957); MEAC Coach of the Year (1994)

Career NFL statistics
- Receptions: 85
- Receiving yards: 1,253
- Receiving touchdowns: 3
- Stats at Pro Football Reference

Head coaching record
- Career: 71–60–3 (.541)

Jack Forsyth "Cy" McClairen (March 2, 1931 – December 28, 2020) was an American professional football player and college coach. He played as an end for the Pittsburgh Steelers of the National Football League (NFL). He was selected in the 26th round of the 1953 NFL draft, but served a two-year stint in the Army. At Bethune–Cookman University, McClairen had duties as head coach in football and basketball as well as duties as athletic director. He served as head football coach from 1961 to 1972 and again from 1994 to 1996. He also coached the most wins for men's basketball in Bethune–Cookman history, having amassed a record of 397–427 in 31 total seasons.

McClairen died on December 28, 2020.

== Head coaching record ==
=== Football ===
Year	Team	Overall	Conference	Standing	Bowl/playoffs
Bethune–Cookman Wildcats (Southern Intercollegiate Athletic Conference) (1961–1972)
1961	Bethune–Cookman	5–3	5–2	T–3rd	
1962	Bethune–Cookman	7–2	6–2	5th	
1963	Bethune–Cookman	6–3	4–3		
1964	Bethune–Cookman	6–3	4–3		
1965	Bethune–Cookman	5–2–1	3–2–1		
1966	Bethune–Cookman	5–2	4–2		
1967	Bethune–Cookman	5–2	3–2	(Division I)	
1968	Bethune–Cookman	4–4	3–2	3rd (Division I)	
1969	Bethune–Cookman	4–3–1	1–2–1	T–3rd (Division I)	
1970	Bethune–Cookman	5–4	1–4	T–7th (Division I)	
1971	Bethune–Cookman	5–4		(Division I)	
1972	Bethune–Cookman	4–5–1		(Division I)	
Bethune–Cookman Wildcats (Mid-Eastern Athletic Conference) (1994–1996)
1994	Bethune–Cookman	5–6	3–3	T–3rd	
1995	Bethune–Cookman	3–8	2–4	T–4th	
1996	Bethune–Cookman	2–9	0–7	8th	
Bethune–Cookman:		71–60–3			
Total:		71–60–3			

== See also ==
- List of college football head coaches with non-consecutive tenure
