= 1994 Prairie View A&M Panthers football team =

American college football season

1994 Prairie View A&M Panthers football
- Conference: Southwestern Athletic Conference
- Record: 0–11 (0–7 SWAC)
- Head coach: Ronald Beard (4th season)
- Offensive coordinator: Darwin Valentine (4th season)
- Defensive coordinator: Douglas Fowlkes (4th season)
- Home stadium: Edward L. Blackshear Field; Rice Stadium

1994 Southwestern Athletic Conference football standings
	Conf.					Overall
Team	W		L		T	W		L		T
No. 7 Grambling State +	6	–	1	–	0	9	–	3	–	0
No. 15 Alcorn State +^	6	–	1	–	0	8	–	3	–	1
Southern	5	–	2	–	0	6	–	5	–	0
Jackson State	4	–	3	–	0	7	–	4	–	0
Alabama State	3	–	4	–	0	6	–	5	–	0
Mississippi Valley State	2	–	5	–	0	4	–	6	–	0
Texas Southern	2	–	5	–	0	4	–	7	–	0
Prairie View A&M	0	–	7	–	0	0	–	11	–	0
+ – Conference co-champions; ^ – NCAA Division I-AA playoff participant; Rankings from The Sports Network poll

The 1994 Prairie View A&M Panthers football team represented Prairie View A&M University as a member of the Southwestern Athletic Conference (SWAC) during the 1994 NCAA Division I-AA football season. Led by fourth-year head coach Ronald Beard, the Panthers compiled an overall record of 0–11, with a mark of 0–7 in conference play, and finished eighth in the SWAC.

Their loss against Jackson State marked their 45th loss in a row to set the longest losing streak in Division I-AA. The previous record was 44 consecutive losses by Columbia from 1983 to 1988.

== Schedule ==
Date	Opponent	Site	Result	Attendance	Source
September 3	at Texas Southern	Robertson Stadium; Houston, TX (Labor Day Classic)	L 13–20		
September 10	at Arkansas–Pine Bluff*	War Memorial Stadium; Little Rock, AR	L 0–51		
September 17	at Langston*	Anderson Stadium; Langston, OK	L 10–36	2,000	
October 1	vs. No. 12 Grambling State	Cotton Bowl; Dallas, TX (rivalry)	L 0–66	66,822	
October 8	No. 15 Southern	Rice Stadium; Houston, TX	L 7–21		
October 15	No. 21 Alcorn State	Edward L. Blackshear Field; Prairie View, TX	L 14–69		
October 22	Alabama State	Edward L. Blackshear Field; Prairie View, TX	L 13–54		
October 29	at Mississippi Valley State	Magnolia Stadium; Itta Bena, MS	L 10–21		
November 5	Tarleton State*	Edward L. Blackshear Field; Prairie View, TX	L 20–70		
November 12	at Jackson State	Mississippi Veterans Memorial Stadium; Jackson, MS	L 7–52	10,500	
November 19	UAB*	Edward L. Blackshear Field; Prairie View, TX	L 6–48	2,007	
*Non-conference game; Rankings from NCAA Division I-AA Football Committee Poll released prior to the game
