= 1994 Murray State Racers football team =

American college football season

1994 Murray State Racers football
- Conference: Ohio Valley Conference
- Record: 5–6 (4–4 OVC)
- Head coach: Houston Nutt (2nd season)
- Home stadium: Roy Stewart Stadium

1994 Ohio Valley Conference football standings
	Conf.					Overall
Team	W		L		T	W		L		T
No. 4 Eastern Kentucky $^	8	–	0	–	0	8	–	4	–	0
No. 16 Middle Tennessee ^	7	–	1	–	0	8	–	3	–	1
Southeast Missouri State	5	–	3	–	0	7	–	5	–	0
Tennessee State	4	–	4	–	0	5	–	6	–	0
Murray State	4	–	4	–	0	5	–	6	–	0
Tennessee Tech	3	–	5	–	0	5	–	6	–	0
Austin Peay	3	–	5	–	0	4	–	7	–	0
Tennessee–Martin	2	–	6	–	0	5	–	6	–	0
Morehead State	0	–	8	–	0	0	–	11	–	0
$ – Conference champion; ^ – NCAA Division I-AA playoff participant; Rankings from The Sports Network poll

The 1994 Murray State Racers football team represented Murray State University during the 1994 NCAA Division I-AA football season as a member of the Ohio Valley Conference (OVC). Led by second-year head coach Houston Nutt, the Racers compiled an overall record of 5–6, with a mark of 4–4 in conference play, and finished tied for fourth in the OVC.

== Schedule ==
Date	Opponent	Site	Result	Attendance	Source
September 1	at Eastern Illinois*	O'Brien Stadium; Charleston, IL	W 31–15	5,320	
September 8	No. 19 Western Kentucky*	Roy Stewart Stadium; Murray, KY (Battle for the Red Belt)	L 13–39	8,161	
September 17	at Southeast Missouri State	Houck Stadium; Cape Girardeau, MO	W 23–16		
September 24	No. 22 Middle Tennessee	Roy Stewart Stadium; Murray, KY	L 21–23	1,956	
October 1	Tennessee–Martin	Roy Stewart Stadium; Murray, KY	W 28–24	4,910	
October 8	at Austin Peay	Governors Stadium; Clarksville, TN	W 29–14		
October 15	at No. 12 Eastern Kentucky	Roy Kidd Stadium; Richmond, KY	L 13–49		
October 29	Tennessee Tech	Roy Stewart Stadium; Murray, KY	L 21–38	10,813	
November 5	at Morehead State	Jayne Stadium; Morehead, KY	W 45–6		
November 12	Tennessee State	Roy Stewart Stadium; Murray, KY	L 21–24	5,138	
November 19	at Western Illinois*	Hanson Field; Macomb, IL	L 17–73	3,786	
*Non-conference game; Rankings from The Sports Network Poll released prior to the game
