= 1994 Delaware State Hornets football team =

American college football season

1994 Delaware State Hornets football
- Conference: Mid-Eastern Athletic Conference
- Record: 7–4 (4–2 MEAC)
- Head coach: Bill Collick (10th season)
- Home stadium: Alumni Stadium

1994 Mid-Eastern Athletic Conference football standings
	Conf.					Overall
Team	W		L		T	W		L		T
No. 22 South Carolina State $	6	–	0	–	0	10	–	2	–	0
Delaware State	4	–	2	–	0	7	–	4	–	0
North Carolina A&T	3	–	3	–	0	6	–	5	–	0
Bethune–Cookman	3	–	3	–	0	5	–	6	–	0
Florida A&M	2	–	4	–	0	6	–	5	–	0
Morgan State	2	–	4	–	0	3	–	8	–	0
Howard	1	–	5	–	0	4	–	7	–	0
$ – Conference champion; Rankings from The Sports Network poll

The 1994 Delaware State Hornets football team represented Delaware State College (now known as Delaware State University) as a member of the Mid-Eastern Athletic Conference (MEAC) during the 1994 NCAA Division I-AA football season. Led by 10th-year head coach Bill Collick, the Hornets compiled an overall record of 7–4, with a mark of 4–2 in conference play, and finished second in the MEAC.

== Schedule ==
Date	Opponent	Site	Result	Attendance	Source
September 3	Cheyney*	Alumni Stadium; Dover, DE	W 27–19		
September 10	No. 5 Youngstown State*	Alumni Stadium; Dover, DE	L 3–23		
September 17	vs. Towson State*	Daniel S. Frawley Stadium; Wilmington, DE (Wilmington Classic)	L 18–42	4,700	
October 1	at Bethune–Cookman	Municipal Stadium; Daytona Beach, FL	W 31–13	5,000	
October 8	at Liberty*	Williams Stadium; Lynchburg, VA	W 22–17		
October 15	vs. Florida A&M	Veterans Stadium; Philadelphia, PA (Philadelphia Classic)	L 18–25	26,864	
October 22	at Morgan State	Hughes Stadium; Baltimore, MD	W 50–21	14,876	
October 29	South Carolina State	Alumni Stadium; Dover, DE	L 38–42		
November 5	North Carolina A&T	Alumni Stadium; Dover, DE	W 31–10	3,641	
November 12	at Rhode Island*	Meade Stadium; Kingston, RI	W 28–26		
November 19	at Howard	William H. Greene Stadium; Washington, DC	W 35–24		
*Non-conference game; Rankings from The Sports Network Poll released prior to the game
