= 1994 Southern Jaguars football team =

American college football season

1994 Southern Jaguars football
- Conference: Southwestern Athletic Conference
- Record: 6–5 (5–2 SWAC)
- Head coach: Pete Richardson (2nd season)
- Defensive coordinator: Sherman Simmons (6th season)
- Home stadium: A. W. Mumford Stadium

1994 Southwestern Athletic Conference football standings
	Conf.					Overall
Team	W		L		T	W		L		T
No. 7 Grambling State +	6	–	1	–	0	9	–	3	–	0
No. 15 Alcorn State +^	6	–	1	–	0	8	–	3	–	1
Southern	5	–	2	–	0	6	–	5	–	0
Jackson State	4	–	3	–	0	7	–	4	–	0
Alabama State	3	–	4	–	0	6	–	5	–	0
Mississippi Valley State	2	–	5	–	0	4	–	6	–	0
Texas Southern	2	–	5	–	0	4	–	7	–	0
Prairie View A&M	0	–	7	–	0	0	–	11	–	0
+ – Conference co-champions; ^ – NCAA Division I-AA playoff participant; Rankings from The Sports Network poll

The 1994 Southern Jaguars football team represented Southern University as a member of the Southwestern Athletic Conference (SWAC) during the 1994 NCAA Division I-AA football season. Led by second-year head coach Pete Richardson, the Jaguars compiled an overall record of 6–5, with a conference record of 5–2, and finished third in the SWAC.

== Schedule ==
Date	Opponent	Rank	Site	Result	Attendance	Source
September 3	at Northwestern State*	No. 20	Harry Turpin Stadium; Natchitoches, LA	W 20–0	15,600	
September 10	Alabama State	No. 15	A. W. Mumford Stadium; Baton Rouge, LA	W 31–0		
September 17	Mississippi Valley State	No. 10	A. W. Mumford Stadium; Baton Rouge, LA	W 19–0	19,496	
October 1	vs. North Carolina A&T*	No. 10	Hoosier Dome; Indianapolis, IN (Circle City Classic)	L 21–22	61,803	
October 8	at Prairie View A&M	No. 15	Rice Stadium; Houston, TX	W 21–7		
October 15	Jackson State	No. 14	A. W. Mumford Stadium; Baton Rouge, LA (rivalry)	L 21–24	27,801	
October 22	at No. 19 Alcorn State	No. 22	Jack Spinks Stadium; Lorman, MS	L 37–41		
October 29	at Nicholls State*		John L. Guidry Stadium; Thibodaux, LA	L 14–20		
November 5	Florida A&M*		A. W. Mumford Stadium; Baton Rouge, LA	L 14–16	22,303	
November 12	Texas Southern		A. W. Mumford Stadium; Baton Rouge, LA	W 21–10		
November 26	vs. No. 7 Grambling State		Louisiana Superdome; New Orleans, LA (Bayou Classic)	W 34–7	66,641	
*Non-conference game; Rankings from The Sports Network Poll released prior to the game
