= 1994 Southeast Missouri State Indians football team =

American college football season

1994 Southeast Missouri State Indians football
- Conference: Ohio Valley Conference
- Record: 7–5 (2–6 OVC)
- Head coach: John Mumford (5th season)
- Home stadium: Houck Stadium

1994 Ohio Valley Conference football standings
	Conf.					Overall
Team	W		L		T	W		L		T
No. 4 Eastern Kentucky $^	8	–	0	–	0	8	–	4	–	0
No. 16 Middle Tennessee ^	7	–	1	–	0	8	–	3	–	1
Southeast Missouri State	5	–	3	–	0	7	–	5	–	0
Tennessee State	4	–	4	–	0	5	–	6	–	0
Murray State	4	–	4	–	0	5	–	6	–	0
Tennessee Tech	3	–	5	–	0	5	–	6	–	0
Austin Peay	3	–	5	–	0	4	–	7	–	0
Tennessee–Martin	2	–	6	–	0	5	–	6	–	0
Morehead State	0	–	8	–	0	0	–	11	–	0
$ – Conference champion; ^ – NCAA Division I-AA playoff participant; Rankings from The Sports Network poll

The 1994 Southeast Missouri State Indians football team represented Southeast Missouri State University as a member of the Ohio Valley Conference (OVC) during the 1994 NCAA Division I-AA football season. Led by fifth-year head coach John Mumford, the Indians compiled an overall record of 7–5, with a mark of 2–6 in conference play, and finished third in the OVC.

== Schedule ==
Date	Opponent	Site	Result	Attendance	Source
September 1	Kentucky State*	Houck Stadium; Cape Girardeau, MO	W 32–6		
September 10	at Sam Houston State*	Bowers Stadium; Huntsville, TX	L 4–24	5,124	
September 17	Murray State	Houck Stadium; Cape Girardeau, MO	L 16–23		
September 24	Tennessee–Martin	Houck Stadium; Cape Girardeau, MO	W 10–0		
October 1	at Morehead State	Jayne Stadium; Morehead, KY	W 45–20		
October 8	at No. 20 Tennessee Tech	Tucker Stadium; Cookeville, TN	W 19–14		
October 15	at Southern Illinois*	McAndrew Stadium; Carbondale, IL	W 24–14	13,000	
October 22	No. 20 Middle Tennessee	Houck Stadium; Cape Girardeau, MO	L 14–38	9,023	
October 29	Austin Peay	Houck Stadium; Cape Girardeau, MO	W 31–10		
November 5	at No. 9 Eastern Kentucky	Roy Kidd Stadium; Richmond, KY	L 6–34		
November 12	at Hawaii*	Aloha Stadium; Halawa, HI	L 0–34	33,675	
November 19	at Tennessee State	Hale Stadium; Nashville, TN	W 17–12		
*Non-conference game; Rankings from The Sports Network Poll released prior to the game
