= 1994 Jackson State Tigers football team =

American college football season

1994 Jackson State Tigers football
- Conference: Southwestern Athletic Conference
- Record: 7–4 (4–3 SWAC)
- Head coach: James Carson (3rd season)
- Home stadium: Mississippi Veterans Memorial Stadium

1994 Southwestern Athletic Conference football standings
	Conf.					Overall
Team	W		L		T	W		L		T
No. 7 Grambling State +	6	–	1	–	0	9	–	3	–	0
No. 15 Alcorn State +^	6	–	1	–	0	8	–	3	–	1
Southern	5	–	2	–	0	6	–	5	–	0
Jackson State	4	–	3	–	0	7	–	4	–	0
Alabama State	3	–	4	–	0	6	–	5	–	0
Mississippi Valley State	2	–	5	–	0	4	–	6	–	0
Texas Southern	2	–	5	–	0	4	–	7	–	0
Prairie View A&M	0	–	7	–	0	0	–	11	–	0
+ – Conference co-champions; ^ – NCAA Division I-AA playoff participant; Rankings from The Sports Network poll

The 1994 Jackson State Tigers football team represented Jackson State University as a member of the Southwestern Athletic Conference (SWAC) during the 1994 NCAA Division I-AA football season. Led by third-year head coach James Carson, the Tigers compiled an overall record of 7–4 and a mark of 4–3 in conference play, and finished fourth in the SWAC.

== Schedule ==
Date	Opponent	Site	Result	Attendance	Source
September 4	vs. Alabama A&M*	Legion Field; Birmingham, AL (Labor Day Classic)	W 34–24		
September 11	vs. Tennessee State*	Liberty Bowl Memorial Stadium; Memphis, TN (Southern Heritage Classic)	W 31–12	50,047	
September 17	Florida A&M*	Mississippi Veterans Memorial Stadium; Jackson, MS	W 35–34	20,105	
September 24	Mississippi Valley State	Mississippi Veterans Memorial Stadium; Jackson, MS	L 16–18	38,500	
October 1	vs. South Carolina State*	Williams–Brice Stadium; Columbia, SC (Palmetto Classic)	L 22–26	21,594	
October 8	vs. Alabama State	Soldier Field; Chicago, IL (Chicago Classic)	W 24–6	44,366	
October 15	at Southern	A. W. Mumford Stadium; Baton Rouge, LA (rivalry)	W 24–21	27,801	
October 22	at No. 6 Grambling State	Eddie G. Robinson Memorial Stadium; Grambling, LA	L 17–28	20,344	
November 5	Texas Southern	Mississippi Veterans Memorial Stadium; Jackson, MS	W 47–41		
November 12	Prairie View A&M	Mississippi Veterans Memorial Stadium; Jackson, MS	W 52–7	10,500	
November 19	No. 16 Alcorn State	Mississippi Veterans Memorial Stadium; Jackson, MS	L 34–52	62,500	
*Non-conference game; Rankings from NCAA Division I-AA Football Committee Poll released prior to the game
