= 1994 The Citadel Bulldogs football team =

American college football season

1994 The Citadel Bulldogs football
- Conference: Southern Conference
- Record: 6–5 (4–4 SoCon)
- Head coach: Charlie Taaffe (8th season)
- Offensive scheme: Option
- Defensive coordinator: Don Powers (6th season)
- Home stadium: Johnson Hagood Stadium

1994 Southern Conference football standings
| | Conf. | | | | | Overall |
| Team | W | | L | | T | W | | L | | T |
|---|---|---|---|---|---|---|---|---|---|---|
| No. 2 Marshall $^ | 7 | – | 1 | – | 0 | 12 | – | 2 | – | 0 |
| No. 17 Appalachian State ^ | 6 | – | 2 | – | 0 | 9 | – | 4 | – | 0 |
| Georgia Southern | 5 | – | 3 | – | 0 | 6 | – | 5 | – | 0 |
| Western Carolina | 5 | – | 3 | – | 0 | 6 | – | 5 | – | 0 |
| The Citadel | 4 | – | 4 | – | 0 | 6 | – | 5 | – | 0 |
| East Tennessee State | 4 | – | 4 | – | 0 | 6 | – | 5 | – | 0 |
| Furman | 2 | – | 6 | – | 0 | 3 | – | 8 | – | 0 |
| Chattanooga | 2 | – | 6 | – | 0 | 3 | – | 8 | – | 0 |
| VMI | 1 | – | 7 | – | 0 | 1 | – | 10 | – | 0 |
$ – Conference champion; ^ – NCAA Division I-AA playoff participant; Rankings from The Sports Network poll

The 1994 The Citadel Bulldogs football team represented The Citadel, The Military College of South Carolina in the 1994 NCAA Division I-AA football season. Charlie Taaffe served as head coach for the eighth season. The Bulldogs played as members of the Southern Conference and played home games at Johnson Hagood Stadium.

== Schedule ==
| Date | Opponent | Site | Result | Attendance | Source |
|---|---|---|---|---|---|
| September 10 | Wofford* | Johnson Hagood Stadium; Charleston, SC (rivalry) | W 31–3 | 18,033 | |
| September 17 | No. 17 Western Carolina | Johnson Hagood Stadium; Charleston, SC | L 38–42 | 14,176 | |
| September 24 | at Appalachian State | Kidd Brewer Stadium; Boone, NC | L 14–56 | 14,631 | |
| October 1 | Newberry* | Johnson Hagood Stadium; Charleston, SC | W 48–20 | 12,117 | |
| October 8 | East Tennessee State | Johnson Hagood Stadium; Charleston, SC | L 34–56 | 15,703 | |
| October 15 | at Furman | Paladin Stadium; Greenville, SC (rivalry) | W 52–44 | 14,157 | |
| October 22 | at Army* | Mitchie Stadium; West Point, NY | L 24–25 | 33,430 | |
| October 29 | at No. 5 Marshall | Marshall University Stadium; Huntington, WV | L 30–42 | 23,260 | |
| November 5 | Chattanooga | Johnson Hagood Stadium; Charleston, SC | W 42–26 | 11,570 | |
| November 12 | vs. VMI | Foreman Field; Norfolk, VA (Oyster Bowl, Military Classic of the South) | W 58–14 | 15,520 | |
| November 19 | No. 24 Georgia Southern^{†} | Johnson Hagood Stadium; Charleston, SC | W 17–15 | 18,559 | |
*Non-conference game; ^{†}Homecoming; Rankings from The Sports Network Poll released prior to the game
