= 1994 Howard Bison football team =

American college football season

1994 Howard Bison football
- Conference: Mid-Eastern Athletic Conference
- Record: 4–7 (1–5 MEAC)
- Head coach: Steve Wilson (6th season)
- Home stadium: William H. Greene Stadium; RFK Stadium

1994 Mid-Eastern Athletic Conference football standings
	Conf.					Overall
Team	W		L		T	W		L		T
No. 22 South Carolina State $	6	–	0	–	0	10	–	2	–	0
Delaware State	4	–	2	–	0	7	–	4	–	0
North Carolina A&T	3	–	3	–	0	6	–	5	–	0
Bethune–Cookman	3	–	3	–	0	5	–	6	–	0
Florida A&M	2	–	4	–	0	6	–	5	–	0
Morgan State	2	–	4	–	0	3	–	8	–	0
Howard	1	–	5	–	0	4	–	7	–	0
$ – Conference champion; Rankings from The Sports Network poll

The 1994 Howard Bison football team represented Howard University as a member of the Mid-Eastern Athletic Conference (MEAC) during the 1994 NCAA Division I-AA football season. Led by sixth-year head coach Steve Wilson, the Bison compiled an overall record of 4–7, with a conference record of 1–5, and finished seventh in the MEAC.

== Schedule ==
Date	Opponent	Site	Result	Attendance	Source
September 3	vs. Mississippi Valley State*	Busch Memorial Stadium; St. Louis, MO (Gateway Classic)	W 27–25	22,994	
September 10	Hampton*	RFK Stadium; Washington, DC (rivalry)	L 20–21	21,555	
September 24	at Florida A&M	Bragg Memorial Stadium; Tallahassee, FL	L 2–29	19,945	
October 1	Towson State*	William H. Greene Stadium; Washington, DC	W 19–13	7,984	
October 8	Bethune–Cookman	RFK Stadium; Washington, DC	W 21–19	13,150	
October 15	at North Carolina Central*	O'Kelly–Riddick Stadium; Durham, NC	W 35–19	10,132	
October 22	North Carolina A&T	William H. Greene Stadium; Washington, DC	L 20–24	19,166	
October 29	at Morehouse*	B. T. Harvey Stadium; Atlanta, GA	L 28–38	13,271	
November 5	at South Carolina State	Oliver C. Dawson Stadium; Orangeburg, SC	L 14–40		
November 12	Morgan State	William H. Greene Stadium; Washington, DC (rivalry)	L 14–17		
November 19	Delaware State	William H. Greene Stadium; Washington, DC	L 24–35		
*Non-conference game
