= 1994 Alcorn State Braves football team =

American college football season

1994 Alcorn State Braves football

SWAC co-champion

NCAA Division I-AA First Round, L 20–63 at Youngstown State
- Conference: Southwestern Athletic Conference

Ranking
- Sports Network: No. 15
- Record: 8–3–1 (6–1 SWAC)
- Head coach: Cardell Jones (4th season)
- Home stadium: Jack Spinks Stadium

1994 Southwestern Athletic Conference football standings
	Conf.					Overall
Team	W		L		T	W		L		T
No. 7 Grambling State +	6	–	1	–	0	9	–	3	–	0
No. 15 Alcorn State +^	6	–	1	–	0	8	–	3	–	1
Southern	5	–	2	–	0	6	–	5	–	0
Jackson State	4	–	3	–	0	7	–	4	–	0
Alabama State	3	–	4	–	0	6	–	5	–	0
Mississippi Valley State	2	–	5	–	0	4	–	6	–	0
Texas Southern	2	–	5	–	0	4	–	7	–	0
Prairie View A&M	0	–	7	–	0	0	–	11	–	0
+ – Conference co-champions; ^ – NCAA Division I-AA playoff participant; Rankings from The Sports Network poll

The 1994 Alcorn State Braves football team represented Alcorn State University as a member of the Southwestern Athletic Conference (SWAC) during the 1994 NCAA Division I-AA football season. Led by head coach Cardell Jones, the Braves compiled an overall record of 8–3–1 with a mark of 6–1 in conference play, sharing the SWAC title with Grambling State. Alcorn State advanced to the NCAA Division I-AA Football Championship playoffs, where they lost to the eventual national champion, Youngstown State, in the first round.

Quarterback Steve McNair won the Walter Payton Award as most outstanding offensive player in NCAA Division I-AA. He was the second, following Jerry Rice, and most recent I-AA player to earn a trip to New York City as a finalist for presentation of the Heisman Trophy. McNair finished third in the voting for the Heisman behind the winner, Rashaan Salaam, and runner-up Ki-Jana Carter.

== Schedule ==
Date	Opponent	Rank	Site	Result	Attendance	Source
September 3	at Grambling State	No. 13	Eddie G. Robinson Memorial Stadium; Grambling, LA	L 56–62	25,347	
September 10	at Chattanooga*	No. 22	Chamberlain Field; Chattanooga, TN	W 54–28	10,110	
September 17	Alabama State	No. 15	Jack Spinks Stadium; Lorman, MS	W 39–7		
September 24	at Sam Houston State*	No. 12	Bowers Stadium; Huntsville, TX	L 23–48	16,148	
October 1	vs. Mississippi Valley State	No. 22	Mississippi Veterans Memorial Stadium; Jackson, MS	W 49–24	34,982	
October 8	Texas Southern	No. 22	Jack Spinks Stadium; Lorman, MS	W 28–21		
October 15	at Prairie View A&M	No. 21	Blackshear Field; Prairie View, TX	W 69–14		
October 22	No. 22 Southern	No. 19	Jack Spinks Stadium; Lorman, MS	W 41–37		
October 29	at Samford*	No. 18	Seibert Stadium; Homewood, AL	T 45–45	11,189	
November 12	No. 6 Troy State	No. 21	Jack Spinks Stadium; Lorman, MS	W 47–44	9,600	
November 19	Jackson State	No. 16	Mississippi Veterans Memorial Stadium; Jackson, MS	W 52–34	62,500	
November 26	at No. 1 Youngstown State*	No. 15	Stambaugh Stadium; Youngstown OH (NCAA Division I-AA First Round)	L 20–63	16,455	
*Non-conference game; Rankings from The Sports Network Poll released prior to the game
