= 1994 Chattanooga Moccasins football team =

American college football season

1994 Chattanooga Moccasins football
- Conference: Southern Conference
- Record: 3–8 (2–6 SoCon)
- Head coach: Buddy Green (1st season)
- Offensive coordinator: Mark Fleetwood (1st season)
- Defensive coordinator: Rick Whitt (1st season)
- Captains: Kenyon Earl; Kurt Gielink; DeMarko Kemp
- Home stadium: Chamberlain Field

1994 Southern Conference football standings
	Conf.					Overall
Team	W		L		T	W		L		T
No. 2 Marshall $^	7	–	1	–	0	12	–	2	–	0
No. 17 Appalachian State ^	6	–	2	–	0	9	–	4	–	0
Georgia Southern	5	–	3	–	0	6	–	5	–	0
Western Carolina	5	–	3	–	0	6	–	5	–	0
The Citadel	4	–	4	–	0	6	–	5	–	0
East Tennessee State	4	–	4	–	0	6	–	5	–	0
Furman	2	–	6	–	0	3	–	8	–	0
Chattanooga	2	–	6	–	0	3	–	8	–	0
VMI	1	–	7	–	0	1	–	10	–	0
$ – Conference champion; ^ – NCAA Division I-AA playoff participant; Rankings from The Sports Network poll

The 1994 Chattanooga Moccasins football team represented the University of Tennessee at Chattanooga as a member of the Southern Conference (SoCon) in the 1994 NCAA Division I-AA football season. The Moccasins were led by first-year head coach Buddy Green and played their home games at Chamberlain Field. They finished the season 3–8 overall and 2–6 in SoCon play to tie for seventh place.

== Schedule ==
Date	Opponent	Site	TV	Result	Attendance	Source
September 3	vs. No. 11 (I-A) Alabama*	Legion Field; Birmingham, AL	PPV	L 13–42	82,109	
September 10	Alcorn State*	Chamberlain Field; Chattanooga, TN		L 28–54	10,110	
September 17	at Gardner–Webb*	Chamberlain Field; Chattanooga, TN		W 47–23	4,417	
September 24	Georgia Southern	Chamberlain Field; Chattanooga, TN		L 20–56	7,324	
October 1	at No. 1 Marshall	Marshall University Stadium; Huntington, WV		L 21–62	26,636	
October 15	VMI	Chamberlain Field; Chattanooga, TN		W 49–14	2,415	
October 22	at No. 23 Western Carolina	Whitmire Stadium; Cullowhee, NC		L 15–53	11,337	
October 29	No. 15 Appalachian State^{†}	Chamberlain Field; Chattanooga, TN		L 16–30	5,929	
November 5	at The Citadel	Johnson Hagood Stadium; Charleston, SC		L 26–42	11,570	
November 12	East Tennessee State	Chamberlain Field; Chattanooga, TN		L 13–30	5,412	
November 19	at Furman	Paladin Stadium; Greenville, SC		W 34–20	9,422	
*Non-conference game; ^{†}Homecoming; Rankings from The Sports Network Poll released prior to the game
