= 1994 Marshall Thundering Herd football team =

American college football season

1994 Marshall Thundering Herd football

SoCon champion

NCAA Division I-AA Semifinal, L 24–28 vs. Boise State
- Conference: Southern Conference

Ranking
- Sports Network: No. 2
- Record: 12–2 (7–1 SoCon)
- Head coach: Jim Donnan (5th season)
- Offensive coordinator: Chris Scelfo (2nd season)
- Defensive coordinator: Mickey Matthews (5th season)
- Captains: Roger Johnson; Shannon Morrison; Vince Parker; Chris Parker; J. D. Cyrus; Todd Donnan
- Home stadium: Marshall University Stadium

1994 Southern Conference football standings
	Conf.					Overall
Team	W		L		T	W		L		T
No. 2 Marshall $^	7	–	1	–	0	12	–	2	–	0
No. 17 Appalachian State ^	6	–	2	–	0	9	–	4	–	0
Georgia Southern	5	–	3	–	0	6	–	5	–	0
Western Carolina	5	–	3	–	0	6	–	5	–	0
The Citadel	4	–	4	–	0	6	–	5	–	0
East Tennessee State	4	–	4	–	0	6	–	5	–	0
Furman	2	–	6	–	0	3	–	8	–	0
Chattanooga	2	–	6	–	0	3	–	8	–	0
VMI	1	–	7	–	0	1	–	10	–	0
$ – Conference champion; ^ – NCAA Division I-AA playoff participant; Rankings from The Sports Network poll

The 1994 Marshall Thundering Herd football team represented Marshall University as a member of the Southern Conference (SoCon) during the 1994 NCAA Division I-AA football season. Led by fifth-year head coach Jim Donnan, the Thundering Herd compiled an overall record of 12–2 with a mark of 7–1 in conference play, winning the SoCon title. Marshall advanced to the NCAA Division I-AA Championship playoffs for the fourth straight season, where they defeated Middle Tennessee in the first round and James Madison in the quarterfinals, before losing to Boise State in the semifinals. Marshall played home games at Marshall University Stadium in Huntington, West Virginia.

During the James Madison playoff game Marshall cornerback Melvin Cunningham set a I-AA playoff record with a 100-yard interception return for a touchdown.

== Schedule ==
Date	Opponent	Rank	Site	Result	Attendance	Source
September 3	Morehead State*	No. 1	Marshall University Stadium; Huntington, WV	W 71–7	23,855	
September 10	No. 16 Tennessee Tech*	No. 1	Marshall University Stadium; Huntington, WV	W 24–10		
September 17	at No. 21 Georgia Southern	No. 1	Paulson Stadium; Statesboro, GA	W 34–13	14,411	
September 24	West Virginia State*	No. 1	Marshall University Stadium; Huntington, WV	W 48–0	20,037	
October 1	Chattanooga	No. 1	Marshall University Stadium; Huntington, WV	W 62–21		
October 8	at VMI	No. 1	Alumni Memorial Field; Lexington, VA	W 49–7	9,538	
October 15	No. 16 Western Carolina	No. 1	Marshall University Stadium; Huntington, WV	W 38–14	24,968	
October 22	at No. 24 Appalachian State	No. 1	Kidd Brewer Stadium; Boone, NC (rivalry)	L 14–24	19,781	
October 29	The Citadel	No. 5	Marshall University Stadium; Huntington, WV	W 42–30	23,260	
November 5	at East Tennessee State	No. 3	Memorial Center; Johnson City, TN	W 42–12	9,417	
November 12	Furman	No. 2	Marshall University Stadium; Huntington, WV	W 35–14	20,405	
November 26	No. 16 Middle Tennessee*	No. 2	Marshall University Stadium; Huntington, WV (NCAA Division I-AA First Round)	W 49–14	17,349	
December 3	No. 13 James Madison*	No. 2	Marshall University Stadium; Huntington, WV (NCAA Division I-AA Quarterfinal)	W 28–21 ^{OT}	16,494	
December 10	at No. 3 Boise State*	No. 2	Bronco Stadium; Boise, ID (NCAA Division I-AA Semifinal)	L 24–28	20,068	
*Non-conference game; Rankings from The Sports Network Poll released prior to the game

== Roster ==
1994 Marshall Thundering Herd football team roster
Players
Coaches
Offense

Pos.	#	Name	Class
RB	4	Jeff Edwards	Jr
C	66	John Wade	Fr

Defense

Pos.	#	Name	Class
DT	86	Billy Lyon	So

Special teams

Pos.	#	Name	Class

Head coach

- Jim Donnan

Coordinators/assistant coaches

Legend

- (C) Team captain
- (S) Suspended
- (I) Ineligible
- Injured
- Redshirt

== Awards and honors ==
- William Pannell, 1st Team All-Southern Conference
- Travis Colquitt. 1st Team All-Southern Conference
- Shannon Morrison, 1st Team All-Southern Conference
- Billy Lyon, 1st Team All-Southern Conference
- Jamie Wilson, 2nd Team All-Southern Conference
- David Merrick, 2nd Team All-Southern Conference
