= 1994 Furman Paladins football team =

American college football season

1994 Furman Paladins football
- Conference: Southern Conference
- Record: 3–8 (2–6 SoCon)
- Head coach: Bobby Johnson (1st season)
- Captains: Kavis Reed; Philly Jones; Braniff Bonaventure
- Home stadium: Paladin Stadium

1994 Southern Conference football standings
	Conf.					Overall
Team	W		L		T	W		L		T
No. 2 Marshall $^	7	–	1	–	0	12	–	2	–	0
No. 17 Appalachian State ^	6	–	2	–	0	9	–	4	–	0
Georgia Southern	5	–	3	–	0	6	–	5	–	0
Western Carolina	5	–	3	–	0	6	–	5	–	0
The Citadel	4	–	4	–	0	6	–	5	–	0
East Tennessee State	4	–	4	–	0	6	–	5	–	0
Furman	2	–	6	–	0	3	–	8	–	0
Chattanooga	2	–	6	–	0	3	–	8	–	0
VMI	1	–	7	–	0	1	–	10	–	0
$ – Conference champion; ^ – NCAA Division I-AA playoff participant; Rankings from The Sports Network poll

The 1994 Furman Paladins football team was an American football team that represented Furman University as a member of the Southern Conference (SoCon) during the 1994 NCAA Division I-AA football season. In their first year under head coach Bobby Johnson, the Paladins compiled an overall record of 3–8, with a mark of 2–6 in conference play, finishing tied for sixth in the SoCon.

== Schedule ==
Date	Opponent	Site	Result	Attendance	Source
September 3	at No. 24 (I-A) Clemson*	Memorial Stadium; Clemson, SC	L 6–27	63,687	
September 10	South Carolina State*	Paladin Stadium; Greenville, SC	W 26–21	15,673	
September 17	No. 8 William & Mary*	Paladin Stadium; Greenville, SC	L 26–28	11,244	
October 1	No. 14 Western Carolina	Paladin Stadium; Greenville, SC	L 24–35	12,125	
October 8	at No. 20 Appalachian State	Kidd Brewer Stadium; Boone, NC	L 6–30	13,661	
October 15	The Citadel	Paladin Stadium; Greenville, SC (rivalry)	L 44–52	14,157	
October 22	at VMI	Alumni Memorial Field; Lexington, VA	W 28–11	6,736	
October 29	at East Tennessee State	Memorial Center; Johnson City, TN	W 33–21	5,744	
November 5	No. 25 Georgia Southern	Paladin Stadium; Greenville, SC	L 26–31	12,161	
November 12	at No. 2 Marshall	Marshall University Stadium; Huntington, WV	L 14–35	20,405	
November 19	Chattanooga	Paladin Stadium; Greenville, SC	L 20–34	9,422	
*Non-conference game; Rankings from The Sports Network Poll released prior to the game
