= 1994 Texas Southern Tigers football team =

American college football season

1994 Texas Southern Tigers football
- Conference: Southwestern Athletic Conference
- Record: 4–7 (2–5 SWAC)
- Head coach: William A. Thomas (1st season)
- Home stadium: Robertson Stadium; Astrodome; Durley Stadium

1994 Southwestern Athletic Conference football standings
	Conf.					Overall
Team	W		L		T	W		L		T
No. 7 Grambling State +	6	–	1	–	0	9	–	3	–	0
No. 15 Alcorn State +^	6	–	1	–	0	8	–	3	–	1
Southern	5	–	2	–	0	6	–	5	–	0
Jackson State	4	–	3	–	0	7	–	4	–	0
Alabama State	3	–	4	–	0	6	–	5	–	0
Mississippi Valley State	2	–	5	–	0	4	–	6	–	0
Texas Southern	2	–	5	–	0	4	–	7	–	0
Prairie View A&M	0	–	7	–	0	0	–	11	–	0
+ – Conference co-champions; ^ – NCAA Division I-AA playoff participant; Rankings from The Sports Network poll

The 1994 Texas Southern Tigers football team represented Texas Southern University as a member of the Southwestern Athletic Conference (SWAC) during the 1994 NCAA Division I-AA football season. Led by first-year head coach William A. Thomas, the Tigers compiled an overall record of 4–7, with a mark of 2–5 in conference play, and finished tied for sixth in the SWAC.

== Schedule ==
Date	Opponent	Site	Result	Source
September 3	Prairie View A&M	Robertson Stadium; Houston, TX (Labor Day Classic)	W 20–13	
September 17	at Savannah State*	Ted Wright Stadium; Savannah, GA	L 14–43	
September 24	at Tuskegee*	Alumni Bowl; Tuskegee, AL	W 10–7	
October 1	at No. 24 Sam Houston State*	Bowers Stadium; Huntsville, TX	L 0–31	
October 8	at No. 22 Alcorn State	Jack Spinks Stadium; Lorman, MS	L 21–28	
October 15	vs. Alabama State	Ladd Stadium; Mobile, AL (Gulf Coast Classic)	L 14–28	
October 22	Mississippi Valley State	Durley Stadium; Houston, TX	W 30–24	
October 29	No. 6 Grambling State	Astrodome; Houston, TX	L 20–51	
November 5	at Jackson State	Mississippi Veterans Memorial Stadium; Jackson, MS	L 41–47	
November 12	at Southern	A. W. Mumford Stadium; Baton Rouge, LA	L 10–21	
November 19	Lane*	Durley Stadium; Houston, TX	W 45–42	
*Non-conference game; Rankings from The Sports Network Poll released prior to the game
