= 1994 Middle Tennessee Blue Raiders football team =

American college football season

1994 Middle Tennessee Blue Raiders football

NCAA Division I-AA First Round, L 14–49 at Marshall
- Conference: Ohio Valley Conference

Ranking
- Sports Network: No. 16
- Record: 8–3–1 (7–1 OVC)
- Head coach: Boots Donnelly (16th season)
- Offensive coordinator: Tom Fiveash (1st season)
- Defensive coordinator: Ed Bunio (16th season)
- Home stadium: Johnny "Red" Floyd Stadium

1994 Ohio Valley Conference football standings
	Conf.					Overall
Team	W		L		T	W		L		T
No. 4 Eastern Kentucky $^	8	–	0	–	0	8	–	4	–	0
No. 16 Middle Tennessee ^	7	–	1	–	0	8	–	3	–	1
Southeast Missouri State	5	–	3	–	0	7	–	5	–	0
Tennessee State	4	–	4	–	0	5	–	6	–	0
Murray State	4	–	4	–	0	5	–	6	–	0
Tennessee Tech	3	–	5	–	0	5	–	6	–	0
Austin Peay	3	–	5	–	0	4	–	7	–	0
Tennessee–Martin	2	–	6	–	0	5	–	6	–	0
Morehead State	0	–	8	–	0	0	–	11	–	0
$ – Conference champion; ^ – NCAA Division I-AA playoff participant; Rankings from The Sports Network poll

The 1994 Middle Tennessee Blue Raiders football team represented Middle Tennessee State University in the 1994 NCAA Division I-AA football season

== Schedule ==
Date	Opponent	Rank	Site	Result	Attendance	Source
September 3	at Tennessee State	No. 16	Hale Stadium; Nashville, TN	W 45–10	15,511	
September 10	at James Madison*	No. 13	Bridgeforth Stadium; Harrisonburg, VA	L 22–24	10,500	
September 24	at Murray State	No. 22	Roy Stewart Stadium; Murray, KY	W 23–21	1,956	
October 1	No. 17 Eastern Kentucky	No. 20	Johnny "Red" Floyd Stadium; Murfreesboro, TN	L 27–28	14,600	
October 8	Tennessee–Martin^{†}	No. 25	Johnny "Red" Floyd Stadium; Murfreesboro, TN	W 38–7	13,000	
October 15	Morehead State	No. 23	Johnny "Red" Floyd Stadium; Murfreesboro, TN	W 63–6	6,500	
October 22	at Southeast Missouri State	No. 20	Houck Stadium; Cape Girardeau, MO	W 38–14	9,023	
October 29	Jacksonville State*	No. 19	Johnny "Red" Floyd Stadium; Murfreesboro, TN	W 45–37	8,000	
November 5	at Austin Peay	No. 17	Governors Stadium; Clarksville, TN	W 28–3	2,891	
November 12	Illinois State*	No. 17	Johnny "Red" Floyd Stadium; Murfreesboro, TN	T 27–27	5,000	
November 19	Tennessee Tech	No. 18	Johnny "Red" Floyd Stadium; Murfreesboro, TN	W 31–3	12,500	
November 26	at No. 2 Marshall*	No. 16	Marshall University Stadium; Huntington, WV (NCAA Division I-AA First Round)	L 14–49	17,349	
*Non-conference game; ^{†}Homecoming; Rankings from The Sports Network Poll released prior to the game
