= 1994 Hampton Pirates football team =

American college football season

1994 Hampton Pirates football

Black college national champion CIAA champion
- Conference: Central Intercollegiate Athletic Association
- Record: 10–1 (8–0 CIAA)
- Head coach: Joe Taylor (3rd season)
- Home stadium: Armstrong Stadium

1994 Central Intercollegiate Athletic Association football standings
	Conf.					Overall
Team	W		L		T	W		L		T
Hampton $	8	–	0	–	0	10	–	1	–	0
Virginia State	6	–	2	–	0	7	–	3	–	0
Norfolk State	5	–	3	–	0	7	–	3	–	0
North Carolina Central	5	–	3	–	0	6	–	5	–	0
Winston-Salem State	5	–	3	–	0	6	–	5	–	0
Livingstone	5	–	3	–	0	5	–	5	–	0
Fayetteville State	4	–	4	–	0	4	–	5	–	1
Elizabeth City State	3	–	5	–	0	5	–	6	–	0
Bowie State	2	–	6	–	0	2	–	8	–	0
Virginia Union	1	–	7	–	0	1	–	1	–	9
Johnson C. Smith	0	–	8	–	0	0	–	10	–	0
$ – Conference champion

The 1994 Hampton Pirates football team represented Hampton University as a member of the Central Intercollegiate Athletic Association (CIAA) during the 1994 NCAA Division II football season. Led by third-year head coach Joe Taylor, the Pirates compiled an overall record of 10–1, with a mark of 8–0 in conference play, and finished as CIAA champion. At the conclusion of the season, the Pirates were also recognized as black college national champion.

== Schedule ==
Date	Opponent	Site	Result	Attendance	Source
September 3	Morehouse*	Armstrong Stadium; Hampton, VA	W 24–15	7,106	
September 10	at Howard*	Robert F. Kennedy Memorial Stadium; Washington, DC (rivalry)	W 21–20	21,555	
September 17	at Virginia Union	Hovey Field; Richmond, VA	W 56–6	5,222	
September 24	vs. No. 17 Grambling State*	Giants Stadium; East Rutherford, NJ (Whitney Young Memorial Classic)	L 29–32	64,315	
October 1	Johnson C. Smith	Armstrong Stadium; Hampton, VA	W 77–3	2,994	
October 8	at Virginia State	Rogers Stadium; Ettrick, VA	W 44–19	3,214	
October 15	Norfolk State	Armstrong Stadium; Hampton, VA (rivalry)	W 53–28	11,059	
October 22	Livingstone^{†}	Armstrong Stadium; Hampton, VA	W 47–7	12,641	
October 29	at Elizabeth City State	Roebuck Stadium; Elizabeth City, NC	W 40–7	1,217	
November 5	C. W. Post*	Armstrong Stadium; Hampton, VA	W 85–7	2,353	
November 12	at Fayetteville State	Bronco Stadium; Fayetteville, NC	W 34–13	3,333	
*Non-conference game; ^{†}Homecoming; Rankings from The Sports Network Poll released prior to the game
