= 1995 Sugar Bowl =

The 1995 Sugar Bowl may refer to:

- 1995 Sugar Bowl (January) - January 1, 1995, game between the Florida State Seminoles and the Florida Gators
- 1995 Sugar Bowl (December) - December 31, 1995, game between the Texas Longhorns and the Virginia Tech Hokies
