= Danny Kanell =

American football player and media personality (born 1973)

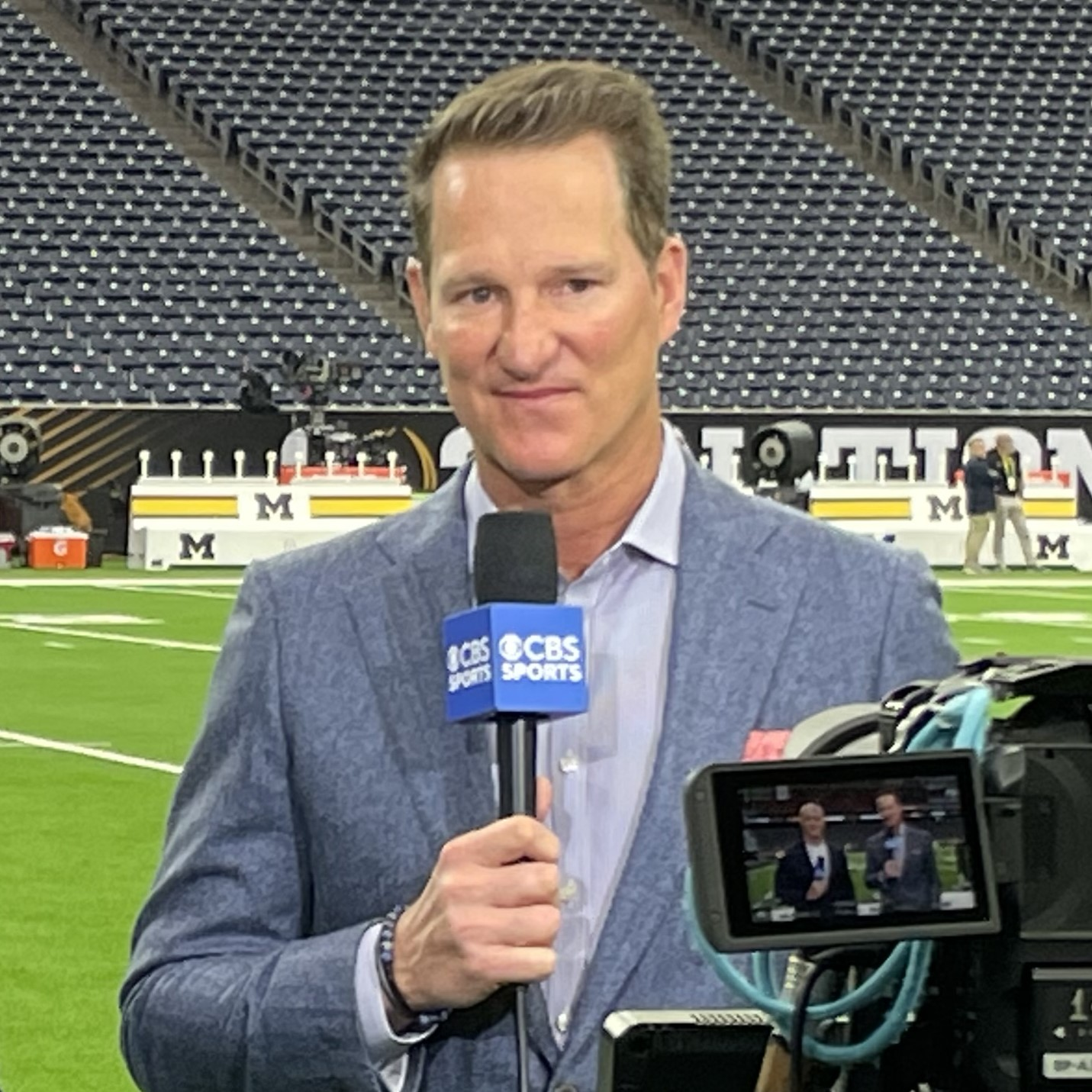
- Kanell in 2024

No. 13, 19
- Position: Quarterback

Personal information
- Born: November 21, 1973 (age 52); Fort Lauderdale, Florida, U.S.
- Listed height: 6 ft 3 in (1.91 m)
- Listed weight: 218 lb (99 kg)

Career information
- High school: Westminster (Fort Lauderdale)
- College: Florida State (1992–1995)
- NFL draft: 1996: 4th round, 130th overall pick

Career history
- New York Giants (1996–1998); Atlanta Falcons (1999–2000); New York Dragons (2002); Denver Broncos (2003–2004)

Awards and highlights
- National champion (1993); Second-team All-American (1995); ACC Player of the Year (1995); ACC Offensive Player of the Year (1995); 2× First-team All-ACC (1994, 1995)

Career NFL statistics
- Passing attempts: 956
- Passing completions: 491
- Completion percentage: 51.4%
- TD–INT: 31–34
- Passing yards: 5,129
- Passer rating: 63.2
- Stats at Pro Football Reference

Career AFL statistics
- Comp. / Att.: 61 / 116
- Passing yards: 617
- TD–INT: 15–7
- Passer rating: 75.25
- Stats at ArenaFan.com

Daniel Paul Kanell (born November 21, 1973) is an American sports broadcaster and former professional football player who is employed by CBS Sports and SiriusXM as an on-air personality. He played as a quarterback in the National Football League (NFL). Kanell played college football for the Florida State Seminoles, earning second-team All-American honors in 1995. He also played in the Arena Football League (AFL).

Kanell is perhaps best known for his broadcasting career, in which he has served as a studio analyst, color commentator, and radio host. He worked as an analyst for ESPN and hosted the Russillo and Kanell show on ESPN Radio. His employment with ESPN ended on April 26, 2017, when he was part of a round of layoffs.

== College career ==
He attended Florida State University, where he played quarterback for four years. In 1992, as a freshman, Kanell won the job of backing up starter Charlie Ward, the team's first freshman backup since Chip Ferguson in 1985. After doing well in occasional backup play, he won the job again as a sophomore in 1993, despite increased competition. The team later moved to alternating between Kanell and fellow sophomore Jon Stark as backups, though Kanell was given the start when Florida State held out Ward against Maryland due to bruised ribs and Kanell responded by completing 28 of 38 passes for 341 yards, five touchdowns, and no interceptions. Overall that year, he threw for 499 yards with 7 TD vs. 0 INT while backing up Ward, who won the Heisman Trophy, Davey O'Brien, Maxwell, and Walter Camp Awards that year.

In his junior year, he threw for 2,781 yards with 17 TD vs 13 INT on 380 pass attempts. He was a part of the famous Choke at Doak game against Florida, where he led Florida State back from a 31–3 fourth quarter deficit to tie the game. He then beat Florida in the rematch at the Sugar Bowl dubbed the "Fifth Quarter in the French Quarter", finishing the year with a 10–1–1 record.

In 1995, his senior year, Kanell threw for 2,957 yards, 32 touchdowns, and 13 interceptions on 402 pass attempts. He led the team to a 10–2 record, including a win over Notre Dame in the 1996 Orange Bowl. He was given an "honorable mention" in the All-American list of his senior year. He was also the starting quarterback for Florida State's first loss to an ACC opponent, as the Virginia Cavaliers defeated Florida State 33–28 on November 2, 1995. While throwing for more than 450 yards during the game, Kanell also threw 3 interceptions and completed less than 50% of his passes. One of those interceptions was thrown at the Virginia 2-yard line late in the first half.

During his career at the university, he played in 35 games and completed 62.2% of his 851 pass attempts. He threw for 6,372 yards, 57 touchdowns (at the time a school record) and 26 interceptions over his four years as a Seminole. He also ran for one touchdown and managed to catch one pass for a loss of three yards. In September 2012 Kanell was inducted into the Florida State Athletic Hall of Fame.

Kanell also played baseball during his freshman and sophomore years, playing in seven games over the two seasons. He was drafted in the 25th round by the New York Yankees in the 1995 Major League Baseball draft.

== Professional career ==
Pre-draft measurables
Height	Weight	Arm length	Hand span
6 ft 3 3/8 in (1.91 m)	222 lb (101 kg)	32 in (0.81 m)	9 3/8 in (0.24 m)

Kanell was drafted by the New York Giants in the fourth round (135th overall) in the 1996 NFL draft. He made his NFL debut later that season. The next season in New York, Kanell became the starter and played the last ten games of the 1997 season, leading the Giants to the NFC Eastern Division title. In those ten games he threw for 1,740 yards with eleven touchdowns and nine interceptions. The Giants played in the playoffs against the Minnesota Vikings but lost 23–22. Kanell went 13/32 with 199 yards and one touchdown in that game. The following year, Kanell started all ten games he played in while throwing for 1,303 yards, eleven touchdowns and ten interceptions. With a record of 3–7 at that point, the Giants benched Kanell in favor of Kent Graham, who led the Giants to a 5–1 record down the stretch and an 8–8 finish. At the end of the season the Giants signed Kerry Collins from the New Orleans Saints and cut Kanell to make enough salary cap room to pay Collins' salary.

In the off season Kanell found a home with the Atlanta Falcons as a backup to their often injured starting quarterback Chris Chandler. He played in Atlanta for two years, starting two games and playing in eight. As a Falcon he completed 99 of 200 attempted passes for a total of 1,117 yards, six touchdowns and nine interceptions. At the end of the 2000 season he was cut by the Falcons and did not sign with another team.

A year later, Kanell signed with the New York Dragons of the Arena Football League for the 2002 season, appearing in four games in Aaron Garcia's absence. Following that, he was signed during training camp by the Denver Broncos. He made the roster as the third-string quarterback in Denver but was let go shortly through the season. Seven games into the season, starting quarterback Jake Plummer and backup quarterback Steve Beuerlein suffered foot and hand injuries, respectively. Kanell was recalled to the Broncos and started two games until Beuerlein and Plummer returned. He threw two touchdowns and five interceptions on 103 pass attempts. Kanell remained with the Broncos for one more year as the backup to Plummer. He never played, as Plummer became the first Broncos quarterback in franchise history to take every offensive snap. After the 2004 season, he was cut by the Broncos and was not picked up by another NFL team.

== Career statistics ==
=== NFL ===
Year	Team	Games			Passing									Rushing					Sacked	
Year	Team	GP	GS	Record	Cmp	Att	Pct	Yds	Y/A	Lng	TD	Int	Rtg	Att	Yds	Y/A	Lng	TD	Sck	Yds
1996	NYG	4	0	—	23	60	38.3	222	3.8	25	1	1	48.4	7	6	0.9	13	0	7	48
1997	NYG	16	10	7–2–1	156	294	53.1	1,740	5.9	68	11	9	70.7	15	2	0.1	8	0	19	171
1998	NYG	10	10	3–7	160	299	53.5	1,603	5.4	46	11	10	67.3	15	36	2.4	10	0	22	172
1999	ATL	3	1	0–1	42	84	50.0	593	7.1	52	4	4	69.2	—	—	—	—	0	5	37
2000	ATL	5	1	0–1	57	116	49.1	524	4.5	35	2	5	49.6	1	0	0.0	0	0	8	60
2003	DEN	5	2	0–2	53	103	51.5	442	4.3	26	2	5	49.1	6	5	0.8	9	0	2	24
2004	DEN	0	0	—	DNP															
Career		43	24	10–13–1	491	956	51.4	5,124	5.4	68	31	34	63.2	44	49	1.1	13	0	63	512

=== AFL ===
Year	Team	Games			Passing								Rushing			
Year	Team	GP	GS	Record	Cmp	Att	Pct	Yds	Y/A	TD	Int	Rtg	Att	Yds	Y/A	TD
2002	New York	4	3	0–3	61	116	52.6	617	5.3	15	7	72.3	0	0	0.0	0
Career		4	3	0–3	61	116	52.6	617	5.3	15	7	72.3	0	0	0.0	0

=== College football ===
Year	Team	Games			Passing								Rushing			
Year	Team	GP	GS	Record	Cmp	Att	Pct	Yds	Y/A	TD	Int	Rtg	Att	Yds	Avg	TD
1992	Florida State	8	0	—	9	20	45.0	135	6.8	1	0	118.2	6	–19	–3.2	0
1993	Florida State	5	1	1–0	36	49	73.5	499	10.2	7	0	206.2	3	−9	−3.0	0
1994	Florida State	12	12	10–1–1	227	380	59.7	2,781	7.3	17	13	129.1	27	−127	−4.7	1
1995	Florida State	12	12	10–2	257	402	63.9	2,957	7.4	32	13	145.5	19	−41	−3.7	0
Career		37	25	21–3–1	529	851	62.2	6,372	7.5	57	26	141.1	55	−196	−3.6	1

=== College baseball ===
Season	Team	G	PA	AB	R	H	2B	3B	HR	RBI	SB	CS	BB	SO	BA
1993	Florida State	23	24	22	2	4	0	0	1	3	0	0	1	5	.182
1994	Florida State	5	4	4	1	1	0	0	0	2	0	0	0	0	.250
Career		28	28	26	3	5	0	0	1	5	0	0	1	5	.192

== Baseball career ==
Kanell was drafted out of high school by the Milwaukee Brewers in the 19th round, and after his junior year at Florida State by the New York Yankees in the 25th round. However, he saw football as more important and signed with the New York Giants when he was drafted in 1996.

During a layoff from football in 2001, Kanell returned to baseball, playing in the minor leagues for the Atlantic League's Newark Bears. He played at first base, third base and designated hitter, hitting for a .237 average with one home run in 79 plate appearances for the Bears. Kanell said he wanted to eventually play for the Yankees, as he had grown up idolizing Yankees first baseman Don Mattingly.

== Broadcasting career ==
Kanell was employed at ESPN starting in 2009, during which he hosted ESPNU's UNITE and served as color analyst for Friday Night college football games and college baseball. Kanell made several guest appearances on ESPN Radio's SVP (Scott Van Pelt) & Russillo. It was announced that he would co-host The Russillo Show full-time after frequent guest appearances. Starting in September 2015, Kanell took on his role as co-host to the new show Russillo and Kanell. He would also appear on ESPN's new College Football Playoff Selection Show alongside Rece Davis, Joey Galloway, and Kirk Herbstreit. On April 26, 2017, Kanell was among approximately 100 staffers let go by ESPN in a cost-cutting measure.

On August 28, 2017, Kanell joined Fox Sports 1 as a college football analyst, and became the host of his own radio show on SiriusXM. In 2018, he began hosting ‘Dog Day Sports’ with Steve Torre on Mad Dog Sports Radio, SiriusXM channel 82. He is currently a co-host of Dusty and Danny in the morning on College Sports Radio on SiriusXM channel 84. He is also an analyst for CBS Sports and a host of the Cover 3 College Football Podcast.

== Personal life ==
Kanell is married to Courtenay Kanell, with whom he has three daughters. He has a sister, Dana, who played tennis at the University of North Carolina. Kanell is the uncle of NC State forward Ben Middlebrooks. During the Wolfpack’s Cinderella run in the 2024 NCAA tournament, Kanell was in attendance for several games wearing a shirt that read "Ben Middlebrooks Uncle." On January 2nd, 2026, Kanell appeared on a live episode of The PBD Podcast, a popular conservative podcast hosted by multi level marketing businessman and entrepreneur Patrick Bet-David.

== See also ==
- History of the New York Giants (1994–present)
