= The Ryen Russillo Show =

- Genre: Sports talk
- Running time: 3 hours
- Country of origin: United States
- Home station: ESPN Radio
- TV adaptations: ESPNews
- Starring: Will Cain (2017); Ryen Russillo (2009–2017); Danny Kanell (2015–2017); Scott Van Pelt (2007–2015); Mike Tirico (2007–2009); Michele Tafoya (2007–2008); Kirk Herbstreit (2007–2008)
- Original release: September 20, 2007 – December 22, 2017
- Website: Website

The Ryen Russillo Show was a syndicated sports talk radio show hosted by Ryen Russillo. Not to be confused with the Barstool Sports podcast of the same name launched in 2025. It was a part of ESPN Radio from 1 pm to 4pm, with all three hours also simulcasted on ESPNews. On April 26, 2017 Danny Kanell was let go by ESPN after a number of personnel were laid off, leaving only Russillo to host the show.

The previous version of the show was launched as The Scott Van Pelt Show on July 6, 2009, replacing Tirico & Van Pelt, which was co-hosted by Scott Van Pelt and Mike Tirico. That show began on September 20, 2007 as The Mike Tirico Show, with Van Pelt, Michele Tafoya and Kirk Herbstreit as rotating co-hosts. The Mike Tirico Show aired from 1 pm to 3 pm under that title for a total of 160 shows until April 30, 2008.

On May 1, 2008, the show was officially renamed Tirico & Van Pelt. Van Pelt also began hosting the first version of The Scott Van Pelt Show, which aired from 3pm to 4pm, immediately following T&VP. Van Pelt's solo hour ended in March 2009 as T&VP moved to 2pm to 4pm. Tirico left the series in June 2009 to focus on his work with ESPN television, and Ryen Russillo became a co-host. On October 4, 2012, the show officially changed its title to SVP & Russillo.

In May 2015, Van Pelt announced that he was leaving the show to become the weeknight midnight anchor on SportsCenter starting in the late summer of 2015 (September 7).

Kanell, who had been a regular substitute co-host during the SVP era, was named permanent co-host with Russillo from September 2015 until Kanell's departure in April 2017.

== Timeslot history ==
The Mike Tirico Show and The Stephen A. Smith Show replaced a rotation of various hosts, under the umbrella title This is ESPN Radio, which had been airing since Dan Patrick announced on July 9, 2007 that he would leave The Dan Patrick Show on August 17 of that year. Patrick was held off-air following that announcement – and the subsequent announcement that he would move to a new syndicated radio show – save for three final episodes airing August 15 through 17.

On March 22, 2008, it was announced that Scott Van Pelt would become Tirico's permanent co-host, and would host the 3–4 pm hour solo.

The Stephen A. Smith Show aired its final episode on April 11, 2008, with Smith focusing more on ESPN television at that time; SportsNation began an hour earlier for two weeks until Van Pelt began hosting the hour on May 1. The 3 pm hour is heard on far fewer affiliates than the 1–3 pm timeslot, as many local sports talk shows air at 3 pm in the Eastern Time Zone.

On New York City's ESPN-owned WEPN, Mike Tirico originally aired only for its first hour, followed by Smith's local show from 2–3 pm and his national show from 3–4 pm; following Smith's departure, Tirico & Van Pelt began airing in the country's largest market in its entirety, with Michael Kay adding another hour, taking over Smith's national hour. In January 2009, Kay's show expanded earlier again, to 2 pm, truncating T&VP back to one hour in the New York market.

As part of a programming overhaul, ESPN Radio moved Tirico & Van Pelt from its 1–3 pm Eastern slot to 2–4 pm Eastern on March 16, 2009, discontinuing Van Pelt's solo hour. The show currently does not air in New York, but does air in Los Angeles and for one hour in Chicago.

Former logo when Scott Van Pelt co-hosted with Ryen Russillo

As of the 2008 NFL football season, Carl Brutananadilewski, a popular character on the Adult Swim animated television series Aqua Teen Hunger Force (currently titled Aqua Teen Hunger Force Forever), has made appearances on The Scott Van Pelt Show. In a segment on Friday afternoons, Carl picks one NFL game's winner every week known as "Carl's Stone Cold Lock of the Century ... of the Week". Meatwad has also introduced Van Pelt's weekly NCAA and NFL football picks. Pictures of Meatwad, Master Shake, and Frylock can be seen on the main desk of Van Pelt's radio show when it is shown on ESPN television networks. A custom Aqua Teen calendar can be seen as well, featuring pictures of Carl posing on the hood of muscle cars.

== On television ==
All three hours of the show (1–4 pm Eastern) aired each day on ESPNEWS. Following Russillo’s departure and Will Cain taking over the show, that timeslot moved to 3—6 pm ET with The Stephen A. Smith Show taking over most of the former timeslot in August 2018.
