= Choke at Doak =

1994 college football game

- Non-conference game
Florida Gators	Florida State Seminoles
(9–1)	(9–1)
31	31
Head coach: Steve Spurrier	Head coach: Bobby Bowden
AP / Coaches; 4 / 4	AP / Coaches; 7 / 6
	1	2	3	4	Total
Florida	7	17	7	0	31
Florida State	3	0	0	28	31
- Date: November 26, 1994
- Season: 1994
- Stadium: Doak Campbell Stadium
- Location: Tallahassee, Florida
- Referee: Al Ford (SEC)
- Attendance: 80,210

United States TV coverage
- Network: ABC
- Announcers: Brent Musburger and Dick Vermeil

The Choke at Doak was a 1994 college football game between the Florida Gators and Florida State Seminoles. The game is one of the most memorable in the heated Florida–Florida State football rivalry and tied the NCAA record for the biggest fourth-quarter comeback. In the matchup of 9–1 cross-state rivals at Florida State's Doak Campbell Stadium, Florida wasted a 28-point fourth quarter lead and allowed the Seminoles to tie the score at 31 in the final minutes. Because the game occurred before the advent of overtime in college football, it ended in a tie that would be regarded very differently by each team's fan base. The post season Sugar Bowl featured a rematch of the Seminoles vs the Gators. Before the game commenced, the score board indicated 5th quarter.

== Background ==
Both teams entered the November 26 game—their final of the regular season—with identical 9–1 records. Florida, ranked fourth, had been the number one ranked team earlier in the season before a loss to Auburn knocked them from their perch. Florida State, the defending national champion, suffered an early-October loss to rival Miami and was ranked seventh heading into the clash with Florida. Florida was led by future Heisman Trophy winner Danny Wuerffel at quarterback, while Florida State had managed to replace 1993 Heisman Trophy winner Charlie Ward with Danny Kanell behind center.

Although Penn State and Nebraska, the top two ranked teams in the nation, were cruising along to undefeated records, there was no chance the two would meet to settle the championship. Penn State had joined the Big Ten Conference one season earlier, which took them out of the Bowl Coalition as the Rose Bowl would not release them from their commitment to the game as conference champions. This opened up the possibility for other schools to perhaps stake a claim to the national championship among those that were in the coalition's affiliated conferences. The winner of the Florida–Florida State game, along with the previous two national champions in Alabama and Miami, would be able to make a case to be invited to the coalition's championship game; since Nebraska was on its way to a Big Eight Conference title, that meant that these teams were playing to go to the Orange Bowl.

== The game ==
On a cool and overcast Saturday afternoon at Doak Campbell Stadium, Florida State got on the board first with a 35-yard field goal from Dan Mowrey. Florida, however, came back with a vengeance and scored 24 unanswered first-half points, building a 21-point halftime lead behind three Danny Wuerffel touchdown passes, including two to receiver Jack Jackson. The Gators padded their lead in the third quarter when Wuerffel scored off a quarterback sneak from the goal line.

With the Gators up 31–3 entering the fourth quarter, many thought the rout was on. Thousands of Florida State fans had seen enough and started to pour out of the stadium in disgust. Big lead in hand, Florida coach Steve Spurrier uncharacteristically decided to play conservatively on offense, mostly calling running plays for Fred Taylor, and opted to utilize a prevent defense. Florida State, in turn, remained in the shotgun almost exclusively and went into its hurry-up offense for the final quarter.

Florida State began the fourth quarter at the Florida 46-yard line and went on a 9-play drive that included a fourth-and-10 conversion. The Seminoles scored their first touchdown of the day on first-and-goal from the 5 when Zack Crockett found the end zone on a fullback dive. The Florida State defense then forced a three-and-out, and after the punt, the Seminoles took over on their own 39. Kanell hit Kez McCorvey for a big gain, taking the Seminoles down to the Florida 25-yard line. Kanell then found a wide open Warrick Dunn on a swing pass for a 19-yard gain. On the next play, Kanell rolled right and connected with Andre Cooper in the front right corner of the end zone for a touchdown, making it a 31–17 game with 10:04 to play.

After the Seminoles again forced the Gators to punt, which was almost blocked after a bad snap, Florida State took over on its own 27. Kanell methodically drove the Seminoles down the field, completing 6 passes, mostly to receivers underneath Florida's zone coverage and running backs out of the backfield. Kanell completed the drive with a 3-yard touchdown run that cut the score to 31–24. Florida took possession at its 33 with 5:04 left to play, and the Gators appeared to steady themselves with a 15-yard completion from Wuerffel to Reidel Anthony. Two plays later, however, Wuerffel threw to an area of the field where there were no Gator receivers and was intercepted by James Colzie at the Seminole 40, sending the Doak Campbell crowd into a frenzy.

On the ensuing possession, Florida State promptly moved down to the Florida 23-yard line on a big 37-yard catch-and-run by Dunn. The drive was capped by a 4-yard touchdown run by Rock Preston with 1:45 left in the game, making it 31–30 Florida pending the extra point. Florida State head coach Bobby Bowden immediately made the decision to kick the extra point rather than attempt a 2-point conversion, overruling his entire coaching staff who unanimously pleaded with him to go for the win (there was no overtime in college football at the time). Bowden did not want to see the Seminoles come back from such a large deficit only to lose on a failed 2-point attempt. Mowrey came on and split the uprights, tying the game at 31 and completing Florida State's historic fourth quarter comeback.

Florida's offense was again unable to muster anything and punted the ball away. The Seminoles took over inside their own 30-yard line with 22 seconds left. Kanell completed a big pass to McCorvey at the Florida State 48 and McCorvey was able to get out of bounds and stop the clock with 17 seconds left. On the next play, Kanell scrambled down to the Florida 43-yard line but was unable to get out of bounds or pick up the first down, either of which would have stopped the clock. With 10 seconds left and the clock running (the Seminoles were out of timeouts), Kanell tried to hurry the offense to line up to spike the ball, but time ran out before he was able to get the snap off and the Seminoles had to settle for a moral victory.

Though the game ended in a 31–31 tie, Florida State players celebrated the result, while Florida players slowly walked off the field, stunned by what had happened.

=== Scoring summary ===
Scoring Play	Score
1st Quarter
FSU – FG Mowrey 35 10:13	FSU 3–0
UF – Hill 58 pass from Wuerffel (Davis kick) 8:28	UF 7–3
2nd Quarter
UF – Jackson 3 pass from Wuerffel (Davis kick) 7:25	UF 14–3
UF – FG Davis 35 3:17	UF 17–3
UF – Jackson 28 pass from Wuerffel (Davis kick) 0:08	UF 24–3
3rd Quarter
UF – Wuerrfel 1 run (Davis kick) 4:34	UF 31–3
4th Quarter
FSU – Crockett 5 run (Mowrey kick) 12:59	UF 31–10
FSU – Cooper 6 pass from Kanell (Mowrey kick) 10:04	UF 31–17
FSU – Kanell 3 run (Mowrey kick) 5:25	UF 31–24
FSU – Preston 4 run (Mowrey kick) 1:45	Tie 31–31

=== Statistics ===
Team Stats	Florida	Florida State
First Downs	19	27
Rushes-Yards	31–85	27–98
Passing	304	421
Comp-Att-Int	21–36–2	40–53–1
Return Yards	0	9
Punts-Avg	6–42	3–35
Fumbles-Lost	1–0	2–2
Penalties-Yards	6–39	5–50
Time of Possession	29:58	30:02

== Aftermath ==
The Seminoles' 28-point rally tied the NCAA record for biggest fourth quarter comeback. Despite the fact that Florida did not actually lose, the game has gone down as one of the biggest "chokes" in college football history and has been popularly dubbed the "Choke at Doak," adding another memorable chapter to the rivalry between the two schools. Although often cited as a proud moment in the history of Florida State football, the game was not all positive for the Seminoles, either. The tie did not enable the Seminoles to make any progress in the polls and thus they were unable to defend their championship.

Florida lost its spot as the Bowl Coalition's #2 team to Alabama following the tie and although they were able to defeat the Crimson Tide one week later in the SEC Championship Game, it was not enough for the Gators to pass Miami for the second spot in the final coalition poll and they instead settled for a rematch with Florida State in the Sugar Bowl on January 2, 1995. This time, the Seminoles emerged victorious.

Both teams continued to find themselves in contention for the national championship in the coming years. Florida would earn a chance the following year against the same Nebraska squad, who defeated Miami in the Orange Bowl on New Year's Night to win the 1994 championship. In what was the first national championship game under the new Bowl Alliance, the Gators were defeated handily in the Fiesta Bowl. A year later, the Gators and Seminoles met in the Sugar Bowl again with Florida emerging victorious. Florida State would factor into the first three Bowl Championship Series title games, winning in the 2000 Sugar Bowl against Virginia Tech.

== See also ==
- Florida–Florida State football rivalry
