= Florida–Florida State football rivalry =

American college football rivalry

- Teams: Florida Gators; Florida State Seminoles
- First meeting: November 22, 1958; Florida, 21–7
- Latest meeting: November 29, 2025; Florida, 40–21
- Next meeting: November 27, 2026, in Tallahassee, FL
- Stadiums: Ben Hill Griffin Stadium (Florida); Doak Campbell Stadium (Florida State)
- Trophy: Makala Trophy, Florida Cup

Statistics
- Total meetings: 69
- All-time series: Florida leads, 39–28–2 (.580)
- Largest victory: Florida, 49–0 (1973)
- Longest win streak: Florida, 9 (1968–1976)
- Current win streak: Florida, 2 (2024–present)

Location of Florida and Florida State

The Florida–Florida State football rivalry is an American college football rivalry between the teams of the two oldest public universities of the U.S. state of Florida: the University of Florida (UF) Gators and Florida State University (FSU) Seminoles. Both universities participate in a range of intercollegiate sports, and for the last several years, the Florida Department of Agriculture and Consumer Services has sponsored a "Sunshine Showdown" promotion that tallies the total number of wins for each school in head-to-head sports competition. However, the annual football game between the Gators and Seminoles has consistently been the most intense and notable competition between the in-state rivals.

FSU and UF first met on the gridiron in 1958 and have played every year since except in 2020, when scheduling modifications due to the COVID-19 pandemic interrupted what was the fourth longest continuous series in college football. The contest has usually been played late in the season and was scheduled on the Saturday after Thanksgiving from 1981 until 2022, when it was moved to the Friday after Thanksgiving. The rivals have also clashed twice in New Orleans in the Sugar Bowl, marking the only occasions in which they've met anywhere besides their on-campus stadiums.

Florida dominated the series until Bobby Bowden became FSU's coach in 1976, after which the rivalry became much more competitive. The intensity level rose to its highest point in the 1990s, when the Gators under Steve Spurrier and the Seminoles under Bowden each came into their contest with top ten rankings for every meeting from 1990 until 2001, adding national championship implications to an already heated in-state rivalry. The winner of the game would go on to compete for a national championship in six of those seasons (1993, 1995, 1996, 1998, 1999, 2000). Both schools have continued their football success into the 21st century, with Florida winning national titles in 2006 and 2008, and Florida State winning in 2013. Florida leads the overall series 39–28–2.

== Series history ==
=== Roots of a rivalry ===
==== Establishment of football programs ====
Several state-supported colleges in Florida established football programs in the early years of the 20th century, including Florida Agricultural College in Lake City, Florida State College (FSC) in Tallahassee, and the East Florida Seminary in Gainesville. FSC's program was active for three seasons (1902 to 1904), and it claimed unofficial state championships in each of those years while playing a limited schedule against in-state private and public schools.

With passage of the Buckman Act in 1905, the Florida Legislature completely reorganized the state's university system. Florida State College became Florida State College for Women, ending its football program. Four other state-supported schools (including the East Florida Seminary and Florida Agricultural College) were consolidated to establish the new University of Florida (UF), a school for men in Gainesville. Florida State College's last football coach, Jack Forsythe, was hired to lead the new school's football program, which began play in 1906. UF's sports teams took on the nickname "Gators" in 1911, and the school was a founding member of the Southeastern Conference when it was established in 1932.

The Florida Legislature reorganized the state's university system again in 1947 to accommodate the post-World War II surge in college enrollment. Both the University of Florida and Florida State College for Women became coeducational, and the Tallahassee institution changed its name to "Florida State University" (FSU). FSU re-established its football program in 1947, and it soon became a founding member of the non-scholarship Dixie Conference. In 1951, FSU left the Dixie Conference, began offering football scholarships, and scheduled games against major college programs as an independent, at which point FSU officials and supporters began pushing for games against the Gators.

==== Starting the series ====
The University of Florida administration, however, was reluctant to treat Florida State University as an equal, less for reasons of intercollegiate sports rivalry than for reasons of limited state funding for higher education and the perception that Florida State's demands for a greater share of those funds might undercut the University of Florida's role as the state's historic flagship university. As the impasse dragged on, a bill was proposed in the Florida Legislature in 1955 which would have mandated that the two schools compete against each other in football and other sports. While the bill was voted down, Florida Governor LeRoy Collins personally requested to University of Florida president J. Wayne Reitz that he take the lead in starting a yearly football series between the two state universities. Reitz agreed, and the schools negotiated a contract that began their football series in 1958, the first available opening on the Gators' non-conference schedule.

One of the stipulations in the first contract was that all games be played in the Gators' home stadium, Florida Field in Gainesville, because the Seminoles' home field at Doak Campbell Stadium had a capacity of under 20,000. The first six games in the series were all played in Gainesville. Florida State initiated a series of expansions to Doak Campbell Stadium, and beginning in 1964, the game site has alternated on an annual home-and-away basis between Gainesville and Tallahassee. The Gators hold a 22–13–1 series advantage in games held in Gainesville. The series is tied in games played in Tallahassee, 14–14–1. The Gators and Seminoles have split two neutral-site games—both Sugar Bowls played in the Caesars Superdome in New Orleans (1994 and 1997). Since the game became a home-and-home rivalry, the Gators lead the series 31–26–1.

== Notable games ==
=== Early contests ===
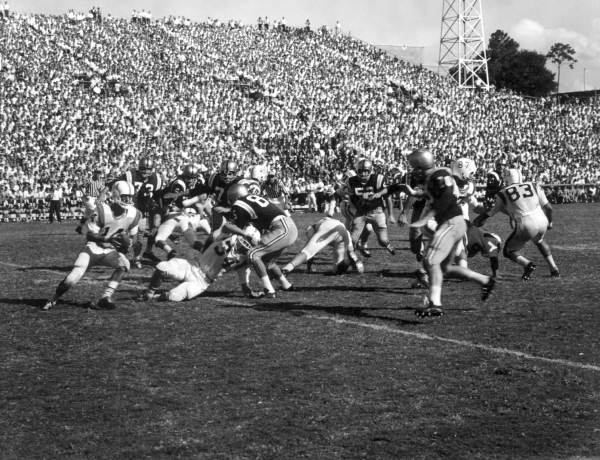
The 1961 game, which ended in a tie

With a strong advantage in resources, facilities, and home field advantage (the first six games of the series were played in Gainesville), the Gators would dominate the rivalry in its formative years, though often in low-scoring contests. Florida won the first three contests before a 3–3 tie in 1961 that Gator coach Ray Graves likened to "a death in the family." The teams finally played in newly expanded Doak Campbell Stadium in 1964, and FSU finally beat Florida, a feat they repeated in Gainesville in 1967.

==== 1969 to 1972: Three straight Gator victories ====
Overall, however, the Gators were 16–2–1 against the Seminoles from 1958 until 1976. One particularly poor stretch for the Seminoles was from 1969 to 1972 when wide receiver Barry Smith was playing for Florida State. He didn't play in the 1969 contest since freshmen were not eligible then but later recalled his experiences in the rivalry for The Tampa Tribune,

"My sophomore year ... I ran a reverse ... and I remember being nailed by Jack Youngblood. I remember watching the ball being pitched to me and thinking, when the ball was about halfway, that it was kind of race to see whether he was going to get to the ball first or me. He was foaming at the mouth. I still have nightmares from the hit he gave me ... . My junior year, we were 5–0 and Florida was 0–5. There is no question that we were the much better team, and they beat us ... . My senior year, we're playing Florida at home and we're 4–0. They had a decent team, but it wasn't like the year before ... . Chan Gailey was their quarterback, and he had a big game. That game was a blowout. They torched us. It got so bad, I had to throw a touchdown pass ... ."

=== 1976–1989: Arrival of Bowden; the rise and fall of Pell ===
Bobby Bowden arrived at Florida State in 1976 and began to turn around the athletic program. From the arrival of Bowden in 197

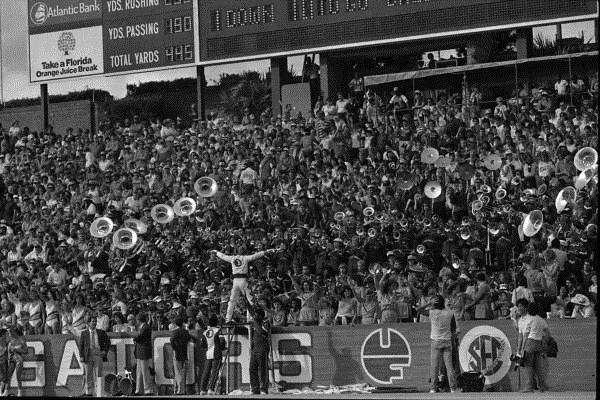
The Marching Chiefs at Florida Field in 1983

6 to the end of the 1980s, the series was tied 7–7. After losing his first game against Florida in 1976, the Seminoles would win the next four in the rivalry, their first wins in the series since 1967.

The Gators changed leadership as well, hiring coach Charley Pell from Clemson University to replace Doug Dickey in 1979. After a dismal 0–10–1 first season, Pell quickly turned around the Florida program, fielding championship-contending teams by the early 1980s.

Under Pell's leadership, Florida took their turn dominating the rivalry from 1981 to 1986, including putting a series-record 53 points on the scoreboard in the 1983 contest. However, an NCAA investigation of Florida's football program revealed multiple violations of rules in the early years of Pell's tenure. Pell was fired and the program put on probation beginning in 1985. For the next 3 seasons, Florida played with a reduced number of scholarship players and Gator football games could not appear on television, setting the program back considerably and allowing Florida State to sign more talented in-state high school recruits.

In 1986, the Gators extended their winning streak against FSU with a 17–13 upset in Tallahassee. However, FSU then ran off four consecutive victories over Florida as they became a fixture in the top-10 rankings and Florida's program floundered under heavy NCAA sanctions.

=== 1990–2001: Bowden vs. Spurrier ===
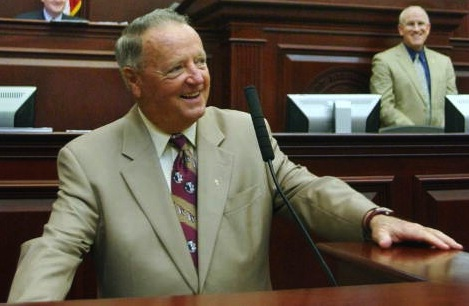
Bobby Bowden

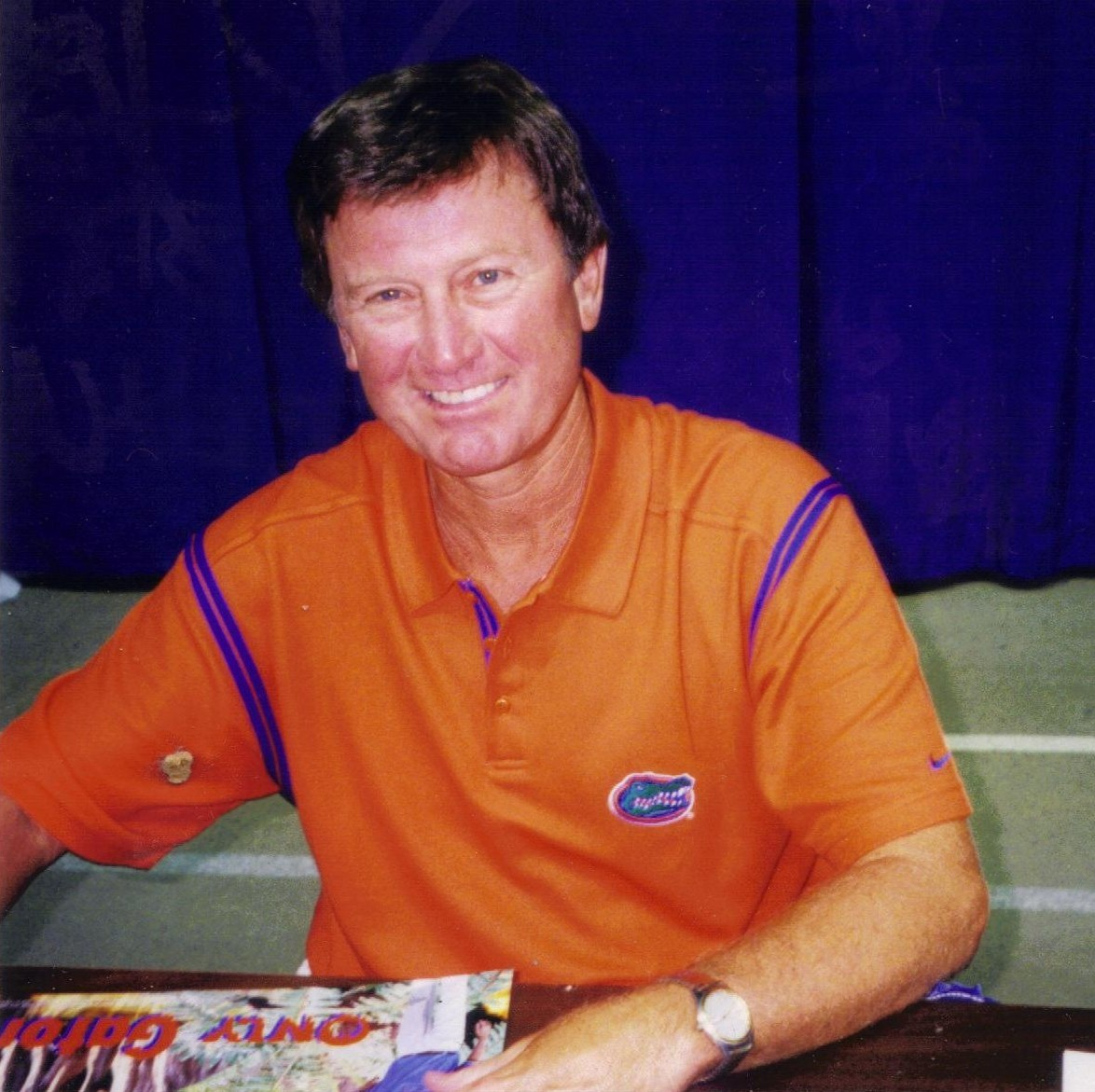
Steve Spurrier

The era in which Steve Spurrier coached Florida against Bowden's FSU squads is widely considered the high point of the rivalry, as the national success of both programs increased the importance and the intensity of the matchups. Florida and Florida State played 14 games in the period (two were Sugar Bowl rematches), and both teams were ranked in the AP Top-10 for 12 of those meetings, including six instances when both rivals were ranked in the Top-5. Florida State and Florida combined for three national championships in the 1990s; Florida State won in 1993 and 1999 and played for two more, while Florida played in two national championship games and won the 1996 title in a Sugar Bowl rematch with FSU. Additionally the programs won a total of fourteen conference championships in the 1990s, Florida State won the ACC eight times while Florida won six SEC titles. The twelve Bowden–Spurrier face-offs provided several of the most memorable games in the series history.

==== 1990: Top ten rivals meet ====
Spurrier had won a Heisman Trophy as Florida's quarterback in 1966 and returned to Gainesville as the Gators' new head coach for the 1990 season. His first experience coaching in the in-state matchup was the first meeting of top-10 squads in the history of the rivalry (UF No. 6, FSU No. 8), with Bowden's Seminoles winning 45–30 in Tallahassee.

==== 1991: Gators preserve win with defensive stand ====
The stakes were even higher in 1991 in Gainesville, as both teams were ranked in the AP Poll top five (FSU No. 3, UF No. 5). The Gators had just clinched their first SEC Championship while the Seminoles were still feeling the sting of a 17–16 defeat at the hands of the rival Miami Hurricanes. The game was a defensive struggle that culminated in a Gator defensive stand late in the fourth quarter to preserve a 14–9 win.

==== 1992: Seminoles win easy ====
No. 3 FSU dominated the 1992 contest in Tallahassee 45–24 against then-No. 6 UF.

==== 1993: National Champion Seminoles beat Gators ====
The 1993 contest was arguably the most talented teams of any in the history of the rivalry. Two future Heisman trophy winners in Charlie Ward and Danny Wuerffel were starting at quarterback. The No. 1 Seminoles beat the No. 7 Gators 33–21, and went on to win the Bowl Alliance national championship.

==== 1994: Choke at Doak ====
In the 1994 contest in Tallahassee, Florida held a 31–3 lead at the start of the 4th quarter, but a furious FSU comeback ended in a 31–31 tie in what became known as the "Choke at Doak". The teams were given a rematch in the Sugar Bowl ("The Fifth Quarter in the French Quarter"), which the Seminoles won 23–17.

==== 1995: Gators cap undefeated regular season ====
The No. 3 Gators beat the No. 6 Seminoles 35–24 in Gainesville in 1995, capping off Florida's first undefeated regular season.

==== 1996: Gators win National Championship in rematch ====
For national championship implications, 1996 was the fiercest of the series. Both teams were undefeated and ranked No. 1 (UF) and No. 2 (FSU) coming into their regular season finale in Tallahassee, where the Seminoles won a hard-fought contest 24–21. Florida would go on to win the SEC and earn a rematch against the No. 1 Seminoles in the Sugar Bowl, where the Gators would use the shotgun formation and win 52–20 for their first national championship in their ninety-year history.

==== 1997: The Greatest Game Ever Played in the Swamp ====
No. 1 FSU was undefeated coming into the 1997 contest against the No. 10 Gators in Gainesville, but Florida won again 32–29 with a late touchdown run by Fred Taylor followed by a Dwayne Thomas interception of Thad Busby to seal the victory.

==== 1998 - 2000: Three straight Seminole victories ====
After these setbacks, Florida State won three straight victories over Top 4 Florida teams, winning the 1998 and 2000 games in Tallahassee and the 1999 contest in Gainesville on their way to a second national championship.

==== 2001: Gators win easy ====
The 2001 game was Steve Spurrier's twelfth and final Florida–Florida State game as the head coach of the Gators. The 2001 Gators entered the game with national title aspirations, and easily defeated the Seminoles 37–13. Florida finished the season 10–2 ranked third nationally in both major polls; Florida State finished 8–4 and ranked fifteenth. The 2001 game was also the end of a twelve-year era for Florida; Spurrier would resign as the Gators head coach following the season, finishing with a 5–8–1 record in the rivalry series.

=== 2002–2004: Zook replaces Spurrier ===
==== 2002: Seminoles win easy ====
Ron Zook made his rivalry debut as Florida's head coach in 2002, and the game marked the first time since 1986 that neither team was ranked in the AP Poll Top 10. Despite being a home underdog, Bowden's Seminoles won easily 31–14.

==== 2003: The Swindle in the Swamp ====
The Seminoles winning continued in 2003 with a controversial 38–34 win in Gainesville known as "The Swindle in The Swamp".

==== 2004: Ron Zook Field ====
Entering the 2004 game, the unranked 7–4 Gators were heavy underdogs when they arrived to face the No. 8 Seminoles in Tallahassee, where they had not won since 1986. Zook had already been fired as the Gators' head man, but was allowed to finish the season. But on the night in which the turf at Doak Campbell Stadium was re-christened "Bobby Bowden Field" in honor of the long-serving Florida State coach, victory belonged to Zook's Florida Gators, 20–13, and Zook was carried from the field by his players and received a standing ovation from the visiting Florida fans.

=== 2005–2010: Urban Meyer and Bowden's retirement ===
Zook's third and final Florida–Florida State game as the Gators' coach started a six-game series winning streak for the Gators. With Florida's hiring of head coach Urban Meyer after Zook's departure, the Gators again rose to national prominence, winning the program's second and third national championships in 2006 and 2008, while Florida State struggled to regain the level of success for which the program was known during the 1990s.

==== 2009: Bobby Bowden's last game ====
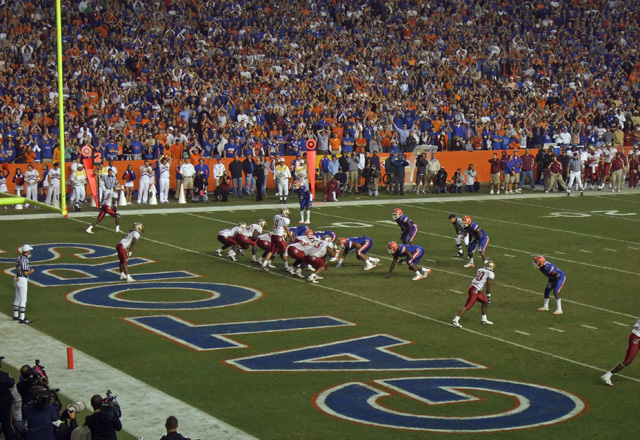
The 2007 Florida–Florida State game

The 2009 Florida–Florida State game marked Bobby Bowden's thirty-sixth against the Gators in thirty-four seasons as the Seminoles head coach; it was also his last, as he retired at the conclusion of the 2009 season. He finished his head coaching career with a 17–18–1 record against the Gators. Remarkably, Bowden's thirty-four years in Tallahassee spanned the tenures of seven different Gators head coaches: Doug Dickey (1970–78), Charley Pell (1979–85), Galen Hall (1985–89), Gary Darnell (1989), Steve Spurrier (1990–2001), Ron Zook (2002–04) and Urban Meyer (2005–10).

==== 2010: Fisher beats Meyer ====
Florida State ended Florida's winning streak in 2010 under first-year head coach Jimbo Fisher, who led the Seminoles to a 31–7 win in Tallahassee. The 2010 contest was the last for Urban Meyer as Florida's head coach and his only loss to Florida State in six meetings.

=== 2011–present: Evolving programs ===
==== 2011 ====
In 2011, Fisher's Seminoles won their first game in Gainesville since 2003 despite gaining less than 100 yards of total offense. Florida quarterback John Brantley threw three interceptions that led to two short rushing touchdowns by Florida State running back Devonta Freeman in the Seminoles' 21–7 victory.

==== 2012 ====
The 2012 contest marked the first time since 2004 that both teams were ranked in the top ten, and the rivalry game was the sixth-most-watched televised game of the college football season as Florida used a ball control gameplan and forced four FSU turnovers to win 37–26 in Tallahassee.

==== 2013 ====
In 2013, Florida State was 11–0 and ranked #1 while the Gators were 4–7 on their way to their first losing record since 1979.

==== 2014: Gators lose Muschamp's final game ====
The Seminoles beat the Gators 37–7 for their most lopsided win in Gainesville en route to their first national championship since Bowden's retirement. FSU was again undefeated and ranked #1 in 2014 when they welcomed an unranked Florida team to Tallahassee. Florida's coach Will Muschamp had already been fired but was coaching out the remainder of the regular season. In what was his last game at Florida, his Gators kept it close before falling 24–19.

==== 2015: ====
In 2015, both teams were once again ranked when #13 Florida State traveled to Gainesville to face #12 Florida. Florida State's defense shut down the Gator offense under first year coach Jim McElwain, allowing only a late safety in a 27–2 rout. It was their third straight win in Gainesville.

==== 2016 ====
Florida's offense sputtered again in the 2016 game, and the Seminoles won 31–13 for their fourth straight win overall in the series.

==== 2017 ====
In 2017, the rivals kicked off their season-ending contest with identical 4–6 records, marking the first time since 1959 that they met with losing records. The contest was the last for each head coach at their respective school, as Florida's Randy Shannon was serving on an interim basis after Jim McElwain's dismissal and Jimbo Fisher would accept the head coaching job at Texas A&M days later. The Seminoles won 38–22 for their fifth consecutive victory in the series and their fourth straight win in Gainesville, their longest win streak at Florida Field.

==== 2018 ====
Both programs were led by new head coaches for the 2018 matchup: Willie Taggart at Florida State and Dan Mullen at Florida. In the first match-up between first year head coaches in series history, Mullen's Gators routed the Seminoles 41–14 in Tallahassee, ending both Florida State's five-game win streak in the series and their NCAA-record 36-year streak of bowl appearances.

==== 2019: ====
Taggart was fired nine games into the 2019 season, and Odell Haggins was serving as the Seminoles' interim coach during the Gators' 40–17 victory in Gainesville. The series was interrupted for the first time in over 60 years in 2020 when both the ACC and SEC played modified conference-only schedules due to the COVID-19 pandemic.

==== 2021 ====
The 2021 contest was held in Gainesville as previously planned, and both teams came into the game with losing records (5–6) for just the third time in series history, with bowl eligibility on the line. With Dan Mullen having been fired days before the game, interim coach Greg Knox led the Gators to a "sloppy" 24–21 victory over Mike Norvell's Seminoles.

==== 2022 ====
The following year, Norvell beat new Florida coach Billy Napier's squad 45–38, which was the highest scoring game in series history.

==== 2023 ====
The next two meetings saw a swing in results and two controversial post-game actions by the winning teams. In 2023, #4 FSU completed an undefeated regular season by beating a Florida squad that finished the season 5–7, then controversially took a chunk of the Florida Field turf as a prize.

==== 2024 ====
In 2024, the bowl-bound Gators won in Tallahassee to clinch the Seminoles' first double-digit loss season in fifty years. After the game, Florida player George Gumbs Jr. planted a UF flag on FSU's midfield logo, leading to a brief fracas between the teams and shouting between the head coaches.

==== 2025: Jadan Baugh stars ====
Another poor season led to the firing of Napier during the 2025 campaign, but interim coach Billy Gonzales led Florida to a season-ending 40-21 victory over FSU behind Jadan Baugh's series record 266 rushing yards. The result also clinched a losing record for both rivals, only the third such season since the series began.

== Game results ==
Florida victories	Florida State victories	Tie games

No.	Date	Location	Winning team		Losing team	
1	November 22, 1958	Gainesville	#12 Florida	21	Florida State	7
2	November 21, 1959	Gainesville	Florida	18	Florida State	8
3	September 24, 1960	Gainesville	Florida	3	Florida State	0
4	September 30, 1961	Gainesville	Tie	3	Tie	3
5	November 17, 1962	Gainesville	Florida	20	Florida State	7
6	November 30, 1963	Gainesville	Florida	7	Florida State	0
7	November 21, 1964	Tallahassee	Florida State	16	Florida	7
8	November 27, 1965	Gainesville	Florida	30	Florida State	17
9	October 8, 1966	Tallahassee	#10 Florida	22	Florida State	19
10	November 25, 1967	Gainesville	Florida State	21	Florida	16
11	September 28, 1968	Tallahassee	#5 Florida	9	Florida State	3
12	October 4, 1969	Gainesville	#12 Florida	21	Florida State	6
13	October 10, 1970	Tallahassee	Florida	38	Florida State	27
14	October 16, 1971	Gainesville	Florida	17	Florida State	15
15	October 7, 1972	Tallahassee	Florida	42	#13 Florida State	13
16	December 1, 1973	Gainesville	Florida	49	Florida State	0
17	October 19, 1974	Tallahassee	#14 Florida	24	Florida State	14
18	October 18, 1975	Gainesville	#14 Florida	34	Florida State	8
19	October 16, 1976	Tallahassee	#12 Florida	33	Florida State	26
20	December 3, 1977	Gainesville	#19 Florida State	37	Florida	9
21	November 25, 1978	Tallahassee	Florida State	38	Florida	21
22	November 24, 1979	Gainesville	#5 Florida State	27	Florida	16
23	December 6, 1980	Tallahassee	#3 Florida State	17	#19 Florida	13
24	November 28, 1981	Gainesville	Florida	35	Florida State	3
25	December 4, 1982	Tallahassee	Florida	13	#15 Florida State	10
26	December 3, 1983	Gainesville	#12 Florida	53	Florida State	14
27	December 1, 1984	Tallahassee	#3 Florida	27	#12 Florida State	17
28	November 30, 1985	Gainesville	#6 Florida	38	#12 Florida State	14
29	November 29, 1986	Tallahassee	Florida	17	Florida State	13
30	November 28, 1987	Gainesville	#3 Florida State	28	Florida	14
31	November 26, 1988	Tallahassee	#5 Florida State	52	Florida	17
32	December 2, 1989	Gainesville	#6 Florida State	24	Florida	17
33	December 1, 1990	Tallahassee	#8 Florida State	45	#6 Florida	30
34	November 30, 1991	Gainesville	#5 Florida	14	#3 Florida State	9
35	November 28, 1992	Tallahassee	#3 Florida State	45	#6 Florida	24
36	November 27, 1993	Gainesville	#1 Florida State	33	#7 Florida	21

No.	Date	Location	Winning team		Losing team	
37	November 26, 1994	Tallahassee	Tie	31	Tie	31
38	January 2, 1995†	New Orleans	#7 Florida State	23	#5 Florida	17^{A}
39	November 25, 1995	Gainesville	#3 Florida	35	#6 Florida State	24
40	November 30, 1996	Tallahassee	#2 Florida State	24	#1 Florida	21
41	January 2, 1997†	New Orleans	#3 Florida	52	#1 Florida State	20^{A}
42	November 22, 1997	Gainesville	#10 Florida	32	#2 Florida State	29
43	November 21, 1998	Tallahassee	#5 Florida State	23	#4 Florida	12
44	November 20, 1999	Gainesville	#1 Florida State	30	#3 Florida	23
45	November 18, 2000	Tallahassee	#3 Florida State	30	#4 Florida	7
46	November 17, 2001	Gainesville	#4 Florida	37	#20 Florida State	13
47	November 30, 2002	Tallahassee	#23 Florida State	31	#15 Florida	14
48	November 29, 2003	Gainesville	#9 Florida State	38	#11 Florida	34
49	November 20, 2004	Tallahassee	Florida	20	#10 Florida State	13
50	November 26, 2005	Gainesville	#19 Florida	34	#23 Florida State	7
51	November 25, 2006	Tallahassee	#4 Florida	21	Florida State	14
52	November 24, 2007	Gainesville	#9 Florida	45	Florida State	12
53	November 29, 2008	Tallahassee	#2 Florida	45	#23 Florida State	15
54	November 28, 2009	Gainesville	#1 Florida	37	Florida State	10
55	November 27, 2010	Tallahassee	#22 Florida State	31	Florida	7
56	November 26, 2011	Gainesville	Florida State	21	Florida	7
57	November 24, 2012	Tallahassee	#4 Florida	37	#10 Florida State	26
58	November 30, 2013	Gainesville	#2 Florida State	37	Florida	7
59	November 29, 2014	Tallahassee	#1 Florida State	24	Florida	19
60	November 28, 2015	Gainesville	#14 Florida State	27	#10 Florida	2
61	November 26, 2016	Tallahassee	#14 Florida State	31	#15 Florida	13
62	November 25, 2017	Gainesville	Florida State	38	Florida	22
63	November 24, 2018	Tallahassee	#13 Florida	41	Florida State	14
64	November 30, 2019	Gainesville	#8 Florida	40	Florida State	17
65	November 27, 2021	Gainesville	Florida	24	Florida State	21
66	November 25, 2022	Tallahassee	#16 Florida State	45	Florida	38
67	November 25, 2023	Gainesville	#5 Florida State	24	Florida	15
68	November 30, 2024	Tallahassee	Florida	31	Florida State	11
69	November 29, 2025	Gainesville	Florida	40	Florida State	21
Series: Florida leads 39–28–2
† Sugar Bowl (1995 and 1997)

=== Results by location ===
State	City	Games	Florida victories	Florida State victories	Tie games	Years played
Florida	Gainesville	37	23	13	1	1958–present
Florida	Tallahassee	30	15	14	1	1964–present
Louisiana	New Orleans	2	1	1	0	1995, 1997

== Coaching records ==
=== Florida ===
Head Coach	Games	Seasons	Wins	Losses	Ties	Win %
Billy Gonzales	1	2025	1	0	0	1.000
Billy Napier	3	2022–2024	1	2	0	0.333
Greg Knox	1	2021	1	0	0	1.000
Dan Mullen	2	2018–2021	2	0	0	1.000
Randy Shannon	1	2017	0	1	0	0.000
Jim McElwain	2	2015–2017	0	2	0	0.000
Will Muschamp	4	2011–2014	1	3	0	0.250
Urban Meyer	6	2005–2010	5	1	0	0.833
Ron Zook	3	2002–2004	1	2	0	0.333
Steve Spurrier	14	1990–2001	5	8	1	0.385
Gary Darnell	1	1989	0	1	0	0.000
Galen Hall	5	1984–1989	3	2	0	0.600
Charley Pell	5	1979–1984	3	2	0	0.600
Doug Dickey	9	1970–1978	7	2	0	0.778
Ray Graves	10	1960–1969	7	2	1	0.750
Bob Woodruff	2	1950–1959	2	0	0	1.000

=== Florida State ===
Head Coach	Games	Seasons	Wins	Losses	Ties	Win %
Mike Norvell	5	2020–present	2	3	0	0.400
Willie Taggart	1	2018–2019	0	1	0	0.000
Odell Haggins	1	2017, 2019	0	1	0	0.000
Jimbo Fisher	8	2010–2017	7	1	0	0.875
Bobby Bowden	36	1976–2009	17	18	1	0.486
Darrell Mudra	2	1974–1975	0	2	0	0.000
Larry Jones	3	1971–1973	0	3	0	0.000
Bill Peterson	11	1960–1970	2	8	1	0.227
Perry Moss	1	1959	0	1	0	0.000
Tom Nugent	1	1953–1958	0	1	0	0.000

== Notable games ==
=== 1961: A death in the family ===
Florida State's upstart football program stunned the Gators on this day with a 3–3 tie. Florida coach Ray Graves likened the result to a "death in the family", Roy Bickford was the star for the Seminoles and was named the game MVP. Bickford blocked a punt to set up the Seminoles' lone FG, intercepted a pass deep in FSU territory to avert a sure UF score, and had another interception on UF's last scoring drive.

=== 1964: FSU's first win ===
Even though many of the early games in the series were close (and the 1961 contest ended in a 3–3 tie), Florida State had yet to beat their in-state rivals in six attempts. The 1964 game would be the first time that the Gators would journey to Doak Campbell Stadium, and the Seminoles under coach Bill Peterson were enjoying their best season since joining the ranks of major college football programs. However, the Gators still felt confident that another victory was in the offing, coming out onto the playing field with the boast "Never, FSU, Never!" attached to their helmets.

Florida State quarterback Steve Tensi hit Fred Biletnikoff with a first-half touchdown, helping the Seminoles to a 13–0 lead at the half as the Gator offense fumbled four times, including once at the FSU one-yard line. Florida, led by quarterback Steve Spurrier, finally scored in the 3rd quarter to cut the lead to 13–7, but were unable to find the endzone again. Les Murdock kicked a 42-yard field goal to secure the win for FSU, 16–7.

After the win, the Seminoles accepted their first bid to a major bowl game, defeating Oklahoma in the Gator Bowl to finish the season 9–1–1.

=== 1966: Catch or not? ===
In an otherwise unremarkable game coming into this eighth annual contest between the burgeoning rivals, this game established the rivalry in full due to the controversy that surrounded its outcome. In a tight contest, the Gators led the Seminoles late in the game, 22–19. FSU had the ball at the Gators' 45-yard-line with seventeen seconds left in the game. On first down, little used and previously injured wide receiver Lane Fenner entered the game in place of FSU's star receiver Ron Sellers. FSU quarterback Gary Pajcic took the snap, Fenner got behind UF defenders, and Pajcic lofted a pass to Fenner in the front corner of the end zone for what appeared to be a game-winning FSU touchdown. However, referee Doug Moseley signaled that Fenner did not have control of the ball before rolling out of bounds and ruled the pass incomplete.

Florida held on for a 22–19 win, but the controversy heated up after the game when photos that apparently showed Fenner making the catch in the endzone were published in state newspapers. Debate over whether or not the play should have been ruled a touchdown continues to this day. The 2014 Florida State Football Media Guide lists the final score as 26–22; nevertheless, third-party references list the score as 22–19.

=== 1969: Cappleman crunch ===
Both Florida and Florida State were 2–0 when the teams met in 1969. The Gators had defeated the number seven ranked University of Houston two weeks prior and FSU was off to a good start as well. The Gators won this matchup 21–6 on the back of a defensive surge that was unparalleled in Gator history. The Gators defense, led by junior defensive lineman Jack Youngblood and sophomore defensive lineman Robert Harrell, sacked FSU quarterback Bill Cappleman eleven times for 91 yards leaving FSU with a total of negative 18 yards rushing in the game. In addition to the pass rush, the FSU offense fumbled the ball eight times, losing five. Two other Gator Sophomores starred in the game as well, All-American wide out Carlos Alvarez and quarterback John Reaves. The Gators went on to a 9–1–1 record including a victory over the Tennessee Volunteers in the Gator Bowl.

=== 1970: Huff, the magic quarterback ===
The Florida Gators dominated Florida State for the first fifty-three minutes of the 1970 game. FSU quarterbacks Frank Whigham and Tommy Warren failed to move the ball and with seven minutes left in the game the Gators led 38–7. FSU coach Peterson put sophomore Gary Huff into the game and he quickly completed two long passes, the second a 43-yard touchdown pass. The FSU defense forced John Reaves and the Gator offense into a three and out, and on the next drive Huff used four plays to score a touchdown with 2:30 left in the game. With the score cut to 38–21 FSU tried an onside kick which failed but didn't fail to cause a both bench-clearing brawl. The FSU defense again forced Florida to punt and as time expired, Huff led the Seminoles to another touchdown making the final score 38–27. Gators All-American Jack Youngblood was criticized by the press for doing a "disrespectful rear-end wagging dance" on a wall near the FSU student section. Both teams ended the season 7–4 but neither received a bowl bid. Huff's passing caused FSU to actually out gain the Gators in the game and it set, at the time, a record for most points scored by both teams in the rivalry.

=== 1993: Ward to Dunn ===
The Seminoles came into The Swamp with a 10–1 record and aspirations of playing for a national championship. Florida State's lone defeat in 1993 was two weeks earlier at the hands of the Notre Dame Fighting Irish, 31–24, in South Bend. The Gators entered the contest 9–1, with a loss at Auburn, but had already clinched the SEC Eastern Division. The 'Noles took an early 13–0 lead in front of what was a state record 85,507 fans at Florida Field. FSU would never relinquish that lead. The Gators finally answered just before halftime when freshman Quarterback Danny Wuerffel hit his receiver Willie Jackson for an 11-yard touchdown pass to cut the Florida State lead to 13–7. Florida State got back to work on their first drive of the second half. Heisman Trophy winning quarterback Charlie Ward completed 5 of 7 passes for 62 yards, including a 7-yard touchdown strike to Kez McCorvey, giving the Seminoles a 20–7 lead. From this point, FSU appeared to have the upper hand as they took an impressive 27–7 lead entering the final quarter. Florida answered with another touchdown pass to Willie Jackson, this time from Terry Dean. FSU stormed right back and just when it appeared the 'Noles would seal the victory, fullback William Floyd coughed up the football and the Florida defense recovered at its own 9-yard line, giving the Gators and its crowd new life. After converting several fourth downs, Florida, behind Quarterback Terry Dean, drove all the way to the FSU 31. Florida would cut the lead to 27–21 when Dean hit his receiver Jack Jackson for a remarkable, juggling, 31-yard touchdown pass which electrified the record crowd at The Swamp. With the crowd roaring louder than it had all day, Ward led the Seminoles back onto the field with just under 6 minutes left in the game. The Seminoles faced third down at their own 21-yard-line. Unfazed, Charlie Ward hit freshman Warrick Dunn up the sideline for a 79-yard game-clinching touchdown run and a 33–21 FSU win. FSU would go on to win the 1993 National Championship, and Florida would win the SEC Championship the following week.

=== 1994: The "Choke at Doak" ===
Both teams entered the game with identical 9–1 records. Florida, ranked fourth, and Florida State, the defending national champions, ranked seventh. Florida, under head coach Steve Spurrier, jumped out to an early lead. In the fourth quarter, Florida held a 31–3 lead over Bobby Bowden's Florida State squad. In the greatest fourth-quarter comeback of the series, the Seminoles rallied and scored four unanswered touchdowns. With 1:45 left in the game, a 4-yard touchdown run by Rock Preston made the game 31–30. Coach Bowden had to make a decision—he chose to kick the extra point to tie rather than attempt a 2-point conversion to win the game, resulting in a final score of 31–31. Florida State scored 28 unanswered points in the final fifteen minutes to cap off the biggest fourth-quarter comeback of the series. Both teams were selected to the Sugar Bowl for a rematch and the first bowl game between the two teams. The game became known as "The Fifth Quarter in the French Quarter." With 1:32 left and Florida State holding a 23–17 lead, Florida's comeback attempt was thwarted when Danny Wuerffel's pass was intercepted by Florida State linebacker Derrick Brooks to seal the game.

=== 1996: No. 1 vs. No. 2 ===
The No. 1–ranked and undefeated Gators came into Tallahassee favored against the second-ranked Seminoles. The 'Noles got off to a quick start when Peter Boulware blocked the Gators first punt of the game, resulting in a touchdown. Florida's eventual Heisman Trophy winner quarterback Danny Wuerffel threw three interceptions in the first half, and FSU had a 17–0 lead after one quarter of play.

Wuerffel got on track after that, throwing for three touchdowns. The last one (to WR Reidel Anthony) cut the Florida State lead to three points with just over a minute left to play. The ensuing onside kick went out of bounds, however, and the Seminoles held on for the 24–21 upset win.

The stars of the game were FSU running back Warrick Dunn, who rushed for 185 yards; Wuerffel, who threw for 362 yards; and the FSU defense, which sacked Wuerffel six times and knocked him to the turf on many other occasions. That Seminole pass rush became a source of controversy after the game when Gators' coach Steve Spurrier claimed that FSU players were encouraged by Bobby Bowden and defensive coordinator Mickey Andrews to deliberately try to injure his star quarterback with late hits and "cheap shots". The Seminoles had been flagged for roughing the passer twice during the game, and Spurrier had the UF video staff compile footage which he claimed showed FSU players tackling Wuerffel late a half-dozen additional times.

=== 1997: Sugar Bowl rematch for the title ===
The late-hit controversy that began after the team's regular season meeting intensified when the Texas Longhorns upset third-ranked Nebraska Cornhuskers in the Big 12 Championship Game and Florida defeated Alabama in the SEC Championship Game, creating an FSU–UF rematch in the Sugar Bowl. Spurrier continued to complain to the press about the issue while FSU coach Bobby Bowden responded that he thought the hits in question were clean while admitting that "we just hit to the echo of the whistle instead of the whistle."

The Sugar Bowl match-up gained even more importance the night before the game when the second-ranked Arizona State Sun Devils lost to the fourth-ranked Ohio State Buckeyes in the Rose Bowl, making the contest between the No. 3 Gators and the No. 1 Seminoles the de facto national championship game.

To counter FSU's pass rush, Spurrier installed the shotgun formation in an attempt to give quarterback Danny Wuerffel more time to throw. The plan worked, as the Gators turned a close game (it was 24–20 early in the second half) into a 52–20 rout behind Wuerffel's 306 yards and three touchdown passes, earning the Gators their first national championship.

=== 1997: Greatest game ever played in the Swamp ===
Florida State entered the game ranked No. 1 and a double-digit favorite over defending national champion No. 10 Florida. It was the third clash in less than a year between the fierce rivals, and the pre-game hype resulted in a minor pregame scuffle and a raucous sell-out crowd for a game that many Florida fans consider one of the best ever played at the Swamp.

The Gators drove the ball 83 yards for a touchdown on the opening series with Spurrier implementing a two-quarterback system in which regular starter Doug Johnson and senior back-up Noah Brindise rotated almost every play. Years later, Spurrier explained that a key reason for rotating quarterbacks was that he'd learned that FSU's coaching staff had deciphered his play signals and rotating quarterbacks allowed him to verbally tell his signal caller the next play before sending him into the game.

Florida State led 17–6 early in the second quarter after Seminoles quarterback Thad Busby found tight end Melvin Pearsall for a five-yard touchdown. The Gators fought back, however, as wide receiver Travis McGriff caught a touchdown from Johnson, and running back Fred Taylor scored from the 4-yard line to put Florida ahead 18–17 at halftime. In the second half, kicker Sebastian Janikowski boomed his second of three field goals to put Florida State back on top, but Taylor responded with a 61-yard touchdown run to retake the lead, 25–20. Seminoles running back Travis Minor scored on an 18-yard touchdown run, to give Florida State a 26–25 lead. The first twelve minutes of the fourth quarter were scoreless, but the Seminoles drove inside the Gators' 5-yard line until the Gators defense, led by Jevon Kearse and Mike Peterson, stopped the 'Noles on three consecutive running plays and the Seminoles settled for another Janikowski field goal, after which Janikowski performed a mock Gator Chomp in celebration. On first down from the Gators' own 20-yard line, Johnson hit receiver Jacquez Green for a 62-yard-pass play. Fred Taylor completed the drive with his fourth rushing touchdown of the night, and Florida took the lead after the three-play drive for good, 32–29. Florida State's final comeback attempt ended when senior Florida linebacker Dwayne Thomas intercepted a third-down pass from Busby, sealing the victory for the Gators, and costing Florida State a chance to play for the national championship.

=== 1998: Not in our house! ===
This 1998 battle between the in state rivals started before the whistle even blew. A pre-game fight caused Florida's starting senior safety, Tony George, and a couple walk-on FSU players who were not dressed, to be ejected from the game. In the midst of the fight, it is rumored that Florida quarterback Doug Johnson attempted to hit FSU coach Bobby Bowden with a football. Johnson later apologized to Bowden for almost hitting him but said that he had thrown the ball into a group of FSU players during the scuffle with no particular target. Florida State's defense came in the ballgame rated No. 1 in the nation, Florida's defense was rated No. 1 in the SEC, so the game was set to be a defensive battle. Florida struck first with a 50-yard Doug Johnson touchdown pass, but Seminoles Peter Warrick and Travis Minor put the Seminoles in scoring position twice and Placekicker Sebastian Janikowski kicked two field goals to make the game 7–6. After a Florida punt the Seminoles were at their own 5-yard line and Florida forced a safety. And then Doug Johnson drove Florida deep into Florida State territory after the safety kick, but Florida State's defense stiffened and forced Florida to settle for three points. At halftime, the game was 12–6, Florida.

In the second half, Florida State's defense held Florida scoreless. Florida State's first touchdown of the game came when quarterback Marcus Outzen threw a pass that was deflected by a Gator defender right to Peter Warrick, who ran it in for the score.. Later in the game, Peter Warrick threw a touchdown to Ron Dugans on a trick play. The game ended 23–12, with Florida State the winner.

=== 2003: Swindle in the Swamp ===
Florida State was ranked No. 9 and Florida No. 11 coming into the 2003 contest in Gainesville. It turned out to be a close and high-scoring affair, but it is most remembered for several controversial referee calls by the ACC officiating crew, and was christened the "Swindle in the Swamp" by several national and Florida sportswriters for the questionable calls on multiple fumble/no-fumble plays that went against Florida. Florida nevertheless held a slim 34–31 lead late in the fourth quarter when Seminoles quarterback Chris Rix hit wide receiver PK Sam for a 52-yard touchdown pass with under a minute to go, giving Florida State a 38–34 lead. Before the winning score, Rix had completed a first down pass on a fourth-and-14 play deep in Seminoles territory to keep the drive alive. The Seminoles went on to hold off the Gators, 38–34.

After the game, a fight broke out on the field between the Florida and Florida State players after some Seminole players celebrated the win by jumping on the "F" logo in the center of Florida Field. FSU's athletic director apologized on behalf of the university for sparking the incident and both schools took steps to make sure similar incidents did not recur.

The questionable calls by the ACC officiating crew led by Jack Childress caused Florida Athletic Director Jeremy Foley to push for two changes which were eventually adopted across college football. Foley pushed the NCAA to consider using instant replay to review close calls, and after many discussions and a successful pilot program, the use of instant replay was adopted by most major college football conferences in 2006. He also proposed that officiating crews be provided by the home team's conference. Florida and FSU agreed to this change beginning with the 2005 game, and the practice has become standard across the NCAA.

=== 2004: Ron Zook Field ===
In the 2004 meeting between the two teams in Tallahassee. Florida State held a ceremony before the game to dedicate the field in honor of Bobby Bowden, officially naming it Bobby Bowden Field at Doak Campbell Stadium. Despite losing to rival Miami at the beginning of the year and an upset to Maryland, the Seminoles entered the contest ranked 8th in the BCS rankings and tracked to make a BCS bowl bid.

The Florida Gators on the other hand where in a completely different direction. Entering unranked and with a disappointing 6–4 record, head Coach Ron Zook had been fired in October after a loss to Mississippi State yet was allowed to coach the rest of the season, thus making the Florida State contest his last as head coach for the Gators.

Despite the festivities and a seemingly overmatched opponent, Florida State struggled. Florida would take a 20–13 lead in the 4th quarter and after a 4th and inches conversion was able to seal the upset and spoiling the field dedication.

Ron Zook was carried off the field by the Florida team in front of stunned Seminole crowd. It was the first time Florida had beaten Florida State in Tallahassee since 1986. Gators fans will often refer to Doak Campbell Stadium as "Ron Zook Field" due to the circumstances of the game.

=== 2008: Soak at Doak ===
The Florida Gators entered as the number 2 team in the country. After being upset by Ole Miss, Florida had convincly won 7 in a row and looked to add their rival Florida State to the list as they were seemingly poised for another national championship appearance.

Throughout the day and game a torrential down pour had hit Tallahassee, making the field conditions at Doak Campbell Stadium very muddy and slippery. The 24th ranked Seminoles hoped the poor weather would give them a better chance against the Gators.

However, it turned into a series of highlights for the Gators. Notable moments included late in the first quarter when Florida Quarterback Tim Tebow trucked Seminole defender Jamie Robinson for a first down. Another visual moment was how Tebow was covered in the garnet paint of the Seminole field as the game continued. Most notably when after a Florida touchdown he was shown firing up the Gators sideline and visiting crowd while covered in his rival teams colors against the Gators all white uniforms.

Florida would go on to win handedly 45–15. After defeating Alabama in the SEC Championship, Florida would beat Oklahoma in the BCS national championship and claim the school's 3rd national title.

=== 2010: Florida State breaks the streak ===
The 2010 affair would prove to be a true changing of the guard in the rivalry. Jimbo Fisher had taken over as head coach for Florida State, after Bobby Bowden was forced to retire by administration in 2009. Despite the controversy of Fisher taking over the Seminoles were able to improve to winning 8 games and clinching a spot in the ACC championship game heading into the final week of the regular season.

Florida came into the game struggling. Being unranked for the first time under Urban Meyer. Florida had won 6 straight meetings against the Seminoles. Many coming in blowout fashion.

However the tables would turn as Seminoles quarterback Christan Ponder would toss 3 touchdowns. And the Florida State defense would smother the Gators offense. Winning decidedly 31–7. It was Florida State's first win against Florida in front of their home crowd since 2002 and snapping a six-year losing streak against the Gators.

Unbeknownst to anyone at the time, this would ultimately be Urban Meyer's last regular season game as Gators head coach. Meyer would announce his resignation from the Florida position a month later and Coach his last game for the Gators in a 37–24 victory against Penn State in the Outback Bowl.

== See also ==
- List of NCAA college football rivalry games

== Bibliography ==
- 2010 Florida State Football Media Guide, Florida State Athletics Department, Tallahassee, Florida, pp. 162, 170–173 (2010).
- 2011 Florida Gators Football Media Guide, University Athletic Association, Gainesville, Florida, pp. 116–125 (2011).
- Carlson, Norm, University of Florida Football Vault: The History of the Florida Gators, Whitman Publishing, LLC, Atlanta, Georgia (2007). ISBN 0-7948-2298-3.
- Golenbock, Peter, Go Gators! An Oral History of Florida's Pursuit of Gridiron Glory, Legends Publishing, LLC, St. Petersburg, Florida (2002). ISBN 0-9650782-1-3.
- Hairston, Jack, Tales from the Gator Swamp: A Collection of the Greatest Gator Stories Ever Told, Sports Publishing, LLC, Champaign, Illinois (2002). ISBN 1-58261-514-4.
- McCarthy, Kevin M., Fightin' Gators: A History of University of Florida Football, Arcadia Publishing, Mount Pleasant, South Carolina (2000). ISBN 978-0-7385-0559-6.
- McEwen, Tom, The Gators: A Story of Florida Football, The Strode Publishers, Huntsville, Alabama (1974). ISBN 0-87397-025-X.
- Nash, Noel, ed., The Gainesville Sun Presents The Greatest Moments in Florida Gators Football, Sports Publishing, Inc., Champaign, Illinois (1998). ISBN 1-57167-196-X.
- Proctor, Samuel, & Wright Langley, Gator History: A Pictorial History of the University of Florida, South Star Publishing Company, Gainesville, Florida (1986). ISBN 0-938637-00-2.
