= 1995 Sugar Bowl (January) =

1995 USF&G Insurance Sugar Bowl
- 61st Sugar Bowl
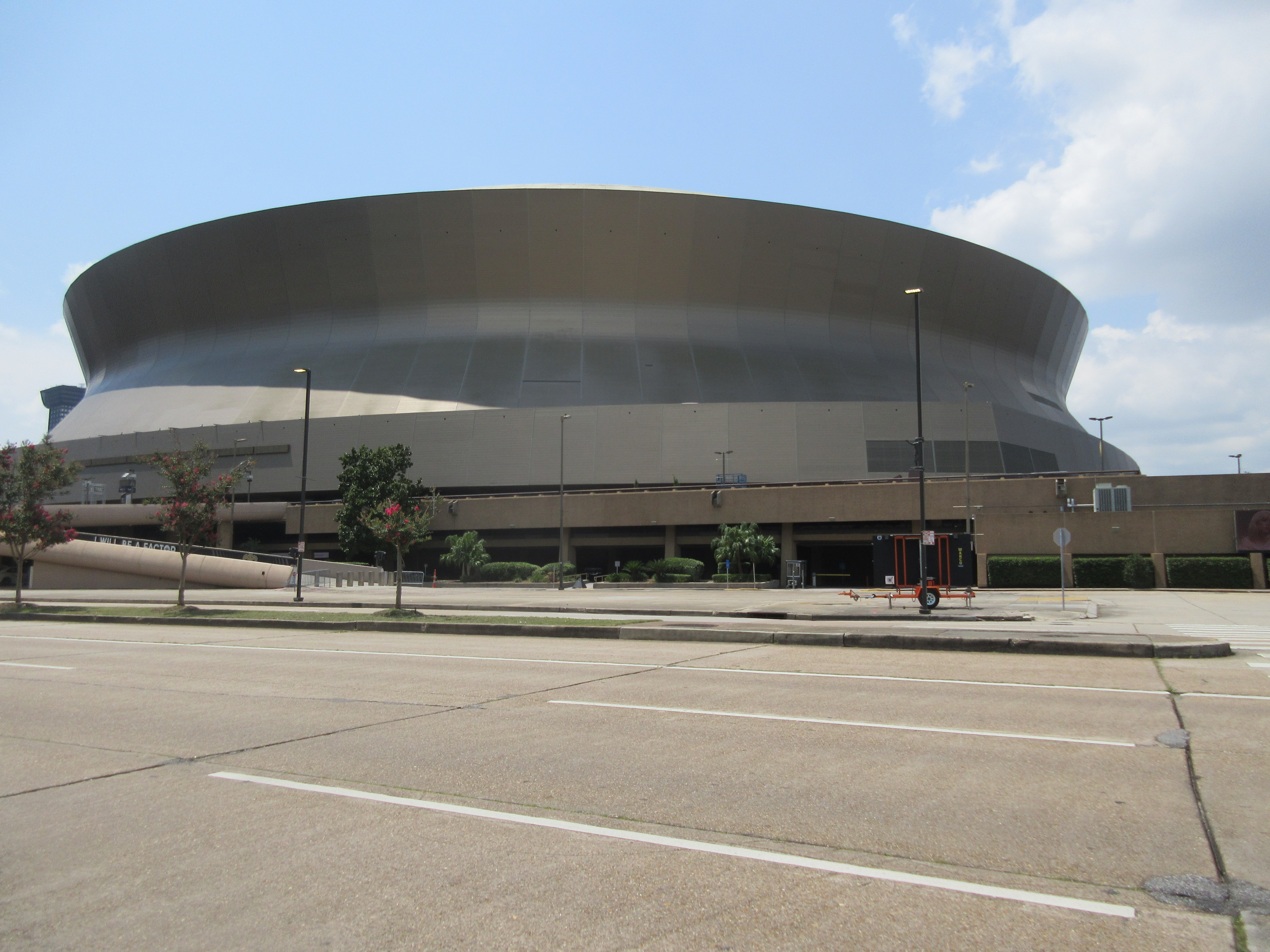
- The Louisiana Superdome in New Orleans, Louisiana, hosted the Sugar Bowl.
Florida State Seminoles	Florida Gators
(9–1–1)	(10–1–1)
ACC	SEC
23	17
Head coach: Bobby Bowden	Head coach: Steve Spurrier
AP / Coaches / BC; 7 / 7 / 7	AP / Coaches / BC; 5 / 4 / 5
	1	2	3	4	Total
Florida State	3	17	3	0	23
Florida	3	7	0	7	17
- Date: January 2, 1995
- Season: 1994
- Stadium: Louisiana Superdome
- Location: New Orleans, Louisiana
- MVP: TB Warrick Dunn (Florida State)
- Favorite: Florida by 1.5 points (54.5)
- Referee: Steve Usechek (Big Eight)
- Attendance: 76,224

United States TV coverage
- Network: ABC
- Announcers: Brent Musburger and Dick Vermeil

The 1995 Sugar Bowl (January) was the 9th Sugar Bowl played on January 2 (since January 1 fell on a Sunday) and only the 13th to not be played on January 1. This was the 61st held Sugar Bowl, and it was the postseason game for the 1994 NCAA Division I-A football season. The game was a bowl rematch between the Florida Gators and the Florida State Seminoles who had played each other in the regular season on November 26.

== Background ==
The two teams had drawn earlier in the season at Tallahassee just 37 days earlier on November 26. Florida State was champion of the Atlantic Coast Conference for the third straight year with a perfect 8–0 ACC record. This was the Seminoles' first Sugar Bowl since 1989. The Gators were 7–1 in the SEC with a loss to Auburn derailing their #1 ranking, but the Gators won the SEC East and beat Alabama in the 1994 SEC Championship Game to be SEC champions for the second straight year and go to the Sugar Bowl for the third time in four years. Due to the thrilling 31–31 tie earlier in the season, the rematch was billed as "The Fifth Quarter in the French Quarter".

== Game summary ==
Judd Davis and Dan Mowrey traded field goals in the first quarter before Fred Taylor fumbled the ball, recovered by the Seminoles, which set up a crucial score. Warrick Dunn (who had 182 all-purpose yards) threw a 73-yard touchdown pass to 'Omar Ellison that gave the Seminoles a 10–3 lead early in the second quarter as FSU added a McCorvey touchdown catch from Danny Kanell later in the quarter to make it 17–3. But Danny Wuerffel retaliated with an 82-yard touchdown pass to Ike Hilliard to make it 17–10. Mowrey kicked a field goal before halftime to give the Seminoles a 20–10 lead at halftime. He later kicked his fourth field goal of the day in the third quarter to make it 23–10. But in the fourth quarter, Wuerffel would not be deterred, driving the Gators on an 80-yard drive that took 17 plays, culminating in a Wuerffel touchdown run with 3:47 left to play. Florida was given a chance at their own 19 with 2:27 remaining after a Seminole punt, but Derrick Brooks intercepted Wuerffel's pass as the Seminoles held on to win their first Sugar Bowl since 1989.

== Aftermath ==
The Bowl Alliance would replace the Bowl Coalition and the Sugar Bowl was part of the agreement (along with the Orange and Fiesta Bowls) to try to provide a proper national championship while also working with the premier conferences to satisfy them. The first season that the Alliance would be in place would be the 1995 season, which consequently moved that season's Sugar Bowl to December 31. Both teams would return to the Sugar Bowl two years later, this time for the national championship.

== Statistics ==
Statistics	FSU	UF
First downs	21	23
Yards Rushing	76	5
Yards Passing	325	449
Total Yards	401	454
Punts-Average	4-39.0	3-45.7
Fumbles-Lost	0-0	2-2
Interceptions	0	1
Penalties-Yards	0-0	2-2

== See also ==
- Florida–Florida State football rivalry
- List of college football post-season games that were rematches of regular season games
