= Scott Van Pelt =

American sportscaster (born 1966)

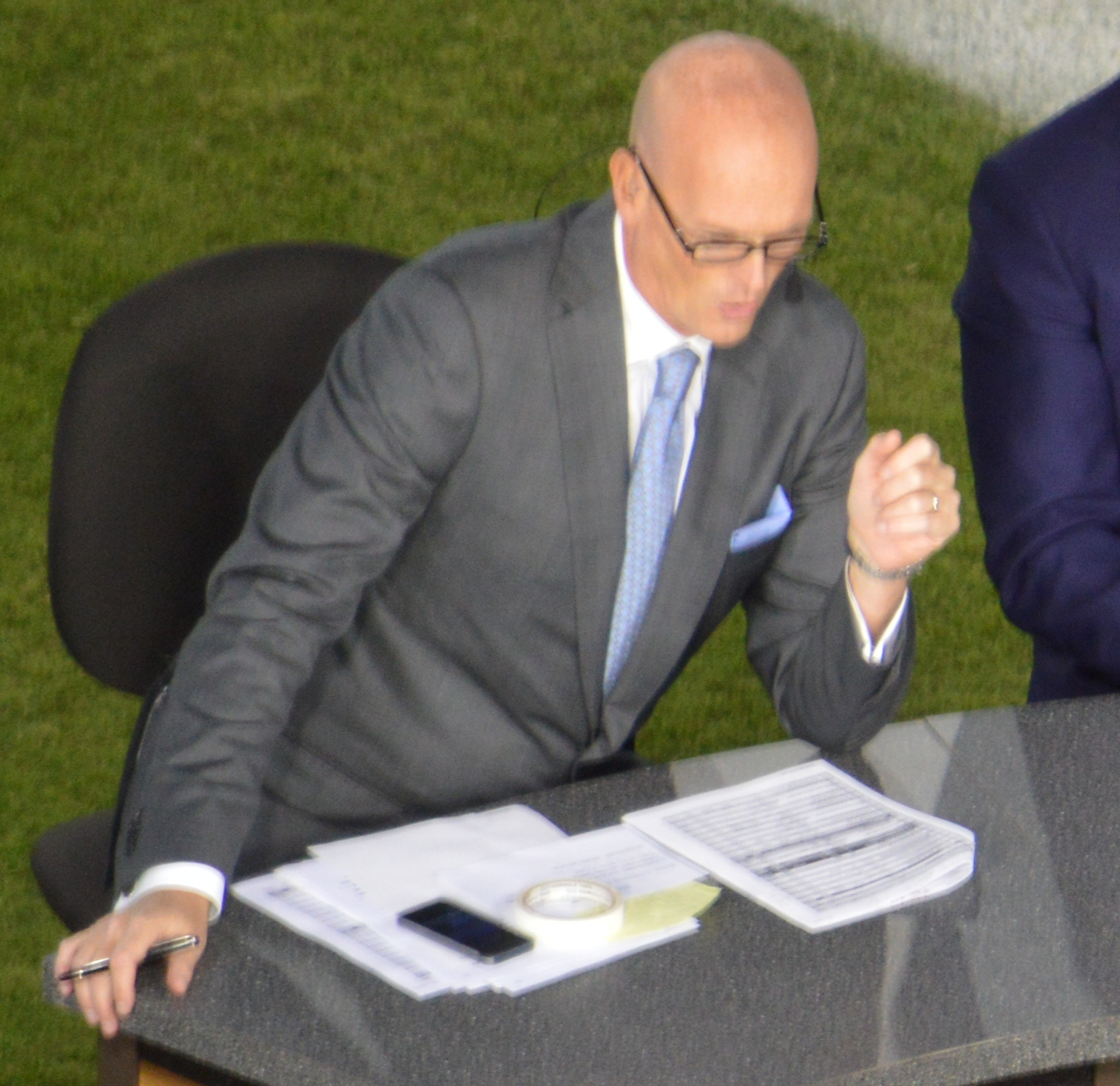
- Van Pelt in 2013
- Born: July 9, 1966 (age 60); Brookeville, Maryland, U.S.
- Education: University of Maryland
- Occupation: Sportscaster
- Years active: 1990–present
- Notable credits: SportsCenter; SVP & Russillo; Monday Night Countdown

Scott Van Pelt (born July 9, 1966) is an American sportscaster and sports talk show host employed by The Walt Disney Company including ESPN and ABC. He is a long time anchor of key editions of SportsCenter, served as the co-host of SVP & Russillo alongside Ryen Russillo on ESPN Radio and hosts various major golf events for the network. For the 2023–24 NFL season, Van Pelt took over as host of Monday Night Countdown.

== Early life and education ==
Van Pelt was born in Brookeville, Maryland. He graduated from the University of Maryland in 1988 with a degree in radio/television and film. He is a member of the Pi Kappa Alpha fraternity.

== Career ==
Van Pelt began his career in sportscasting in 1990 at WTTG, a Fox affiliate in Washington, D.C. From 1995 to 2000, Van Pelt worked for Golf Channel, where he was a studio host for some of the network's signature programs. He left the channel in 2001 to join ESPN, where he serves as a SportsCenter anchor and is one of the network's top golf correspondents, covering major tournaments such as the Masters Tournament. After acquiring the cable rights to the tournament, Van Pelt appeared on ESPN's coverage of The Open Championship. He is a prominent personality for ESPN Radio, where he was the co-host of Tirico and Van Pelt alongside Mike Tirico before the program was canceled and replaced with Van Pelt's own three-hour program, The Scott Van Pelt Show in 2009. The show was renamed SVP & Russillo in October 2012 with Van Pelt working with Ryen Russillo. He was a studio presenter for the ESPN Network's Friday Night College Football on ESPN.

Van Pelt has also appeared as a commentator in golf video games, alongside Kelly Tilghman on EA Sports' Tiger Woods PGA Tour 10 and Tiger Woods PGA Tour 11 and in a comedic turn in Aqua Teen Hunger Force Zombie Ninja Pro-Am.

In 2012, Van Pelt made the decision to stay with ESPN. In May 2015, the network announced Van Pelt would leave the radio show SVP & Russillo to become a solo anchor for a midnight edition of SportsCenter, which began in late summer 2015. The midnight show covers sports events from the day, but includes additional commentary from Van Pelt and some popular elements from the radio show.

ESPN's 2025 TGL golf league broadcasts feature Van Pelt as host from his SportsCenter studio in Washington (with the exception of the SoFi Cup Finals hosted on-site at SoFi Center in Palm Beach Gardens) and Matt Barrie calling the play, with Marty Smith conducting sideline reports.

== Personal life ==
Van Pelt's grandfather, Lorenzo, immigrated to the U.S. from Italy and lived in Brooklyn. Van Pelt and wife Stephanie have three children.
