= List of clubs in the German Football League =

This is a List of clubs in the German Football League, including all clubs who played in the league while its official name was American football Bundesliga.

The American football Bundesliga was formed in 1979, consisting of six clubs. It was renamed to German Football League in 1999. From its inaugural season to the end of the 2015 season, 71 different clubs have played in the league, with the Frankfurt Universe becoming the 72nd team to enter the league in 2016. Of these clubs, the Munich Cowboys have spent the most seasons in the league, 35 of a possible 38 as of 2016, followed by the Berlin Adler with 34, both clubs being founding members of the league. The record number of championships, the German Bowl, have been won by the New Yorker Lions, formerly the Braunschweig Lions, with eleven wins. The Lions are also the record holder in division championships, with twelve, while the Berlin Adler hold the record for play-off participations with 24.

== Overview ==
The league was formed with six club in 1979, with the top two teams after the regular season contesting the German Bowl. From 1980, onwards the league was always split into a northern and southern division. From 1986 to 1990 these two divisions were further subdivided, resulting in a four division format. Since 1991, it has been playing as a two division league again, north and south.

The German champions have been, from the inaugural season, determined in the German Bowl. From 1981, onwards play-offs were held to determine the two teams playing in the German Bowl. In 1981, the play-offs consisted of four teams, from 1982 onwards of eight. From 1986 to 1990 twelve teams qualified for the play-offs, with the four division champions receiving a bye for the first round. Since 1991, the format has returned to eight teams. The play-off contenders are evenly spread over each division, meaning, in the current two division format the best four teams in each division qualify.

== List of clubs ==
The list of clubs in the league from its inception in 1979 to the present season, sorted by the last season a club played in the league:

Club	No	First	Last	PO	Div	Bowl	Seasons (Bowl)
Munich Cowboys	39	1979	Present	22	6	1	1993
Cologne Crocodiles	27	1981	Present	21	3	1	2000
Allgäu Comets ^{2}	17	1985	Present	6	—	—	—
Stuttgart Scorpions	29	1986	Present	20	2	—	—
Schwäbisch Hall Unicorns	23	1988	Present	18	10	4	2011, 2012, 2017, 2018
Berlin Rebels	14	1992	Present	4	—	—	—
New Yorker Lions^{1}	27	1994	Present	22	15	12	1997–1999, 2005–2008, 2013–2016, 2019
Kiel Baltic Hurricanes	21	1996	Present	15	4	1	2010
Marburg Mercenaries	18	2003	Present	13	5	—	—
Dresden Monarchs	18	2003	Present	15	—	—	—
Frankfurt Universe	5	2016	Present	4	—	—	—
Potsdam Royals	3	2018	Present	—	—	—	—
Ravensburg Razorbacks	1	2021	Present	—	—	—	—
Saarland Hurricanes	15	2001	Present	3	—	—	—
Hildesheim Invaders	6	1990	2019	1	—	—	—
Ingolstadt Dukes	3	2017	2019	1	—	—	—
Kirchdorf Wildcats	2	2018	2019	—	—	—	—
Düsseldorf Panther	31	1979	2019	18	9	6	1983, 1984, 1986, 1992, 1994, 1995
Hamburg Huskies	4	2015	2018	1	—	—	—
Berlin Adler	35	1979	2017	24	9	6	1987, 1989–1991, 2004, 2009
Rhein-Neckar Bandits	5	2012	2016	2	—	—	—
Franken Knights ^{3}	14	1986	2015	5	—	—	—
Cologne Falcons	6	2005	2014	2	—	—	—
Hamburg Blue Devils	16	1995	2013	12	2	4	1996, 2001–2003
Wiesbaden Phantoms	3	2011	2013	—	—	—	—
Lübeck Cougars	1	2012	2012	—	—	—	—
Assindia Cardinals	11	1986	2011	2	—	—	—
Plattling Black Hawks	3	2009	2011	1	—	—	—
Mönchengladbach Mavericks	1	2011	2011	1	—	—	—
Weinheim Longhorns	4	2007	2010	—	—	—	—
Darmstadt Diamonds	6	1990	2008	2	—	—	—
Hannover Musketeers	1	2004	2004	—	—	—	—
Rüsselsheim Razorbacks ^{5}	8	1996	2003	6	3	—	—
Landsberg Express	4	1997	2000	1	—	—	—
Aschaffenburg Stallions	2	1999	2000	1	—	—	—
Paderborn Dolphins	2	1998	1999	—	—	—	—
Hanau Hornets	1	1999	1999	—	—	—	—
Hanau Hawks	17	1980	1998	13	2	—	—
Nürnberg Rams ^{4}	16	1983	1998	14	4	—	—
Regensburg Royals	4	1992	1995	2	—	—	—
Erding Bulls	2	1981	1994	—	—	—	—
Solingen Hurricanes ^{6}	7	1986	1994	—	—	—	—
Hamburg Silver Eagles	3	1991	1994	1	—	—	—
Bad Homburg Falken	12	1981	1993	5	1	—	—
Dortmund Giants	10	1981	1993	5	—	—	—
Monheim Sharks	9	1985	1993	4	—	—	—
Badener Greifs	8	1986	1993	6	4	—	—
Cologne Bears	1	1992	1992	—	—	—	—
Red Barons Cologne	9	1983	1991	7	1	1	1988
München Rangers	5	1987	1991	1	—	—	—
Ansbach Grizzlies	12	1979	1990	11	7	3	1981, 1982, 1985
Düsseldorf Bulldozer	7	1984	1990	3	—	—	—
Troisdorf Jets ^{7}	7	1984	1990	3	—	—	—
Mainz Golden Eagles	6	1985	1990	1	—	—	—
Würzburg Pumas	3	1988	1990	—	—	—	—
Bremen Buccaneers	2	1989	1990	—	—	—	—
Rüsselsheim Crusaders	2	1989	1990	—	—	—	—
Fürth Buffalos	1	1990	1990	—	—	—	—
Ratingen Raiders	2	1988	1989	—	—	—	—
Königsbrunn Ants ^{8}	1	1989	1989	—	—	—	—
Mannheim Redskins	6	1982	1988	2	—	—	—
Hamburg Dolphins	5	1983	1988	—	—	—	—
Recklinghausen Chargers	1	1987	1987	—	—	—	—
Bremerhaven Seahawks	5	1979	1986	1	—	—	—
Nürnberg Vikings	1	1986	1986	—	—	—	—
Frankfurter Löwen	6	1979	1984	6	3	2	1979, 1980
Starnberg Argonauts	2	1983	1984	—	—	—	—
Stuttgart Stallions	3	1981	1983	—	—	—	—
Essen Eagles	2	1980	1983	1	—	—	—
Solingen Steelers	2	1981	1982	—	—	—	—
Herne Tigers	1	1982	1982	—	—	—	—
Mönchengladbach Mustangs	1	1982	1982	—	—	—	—
Straubing Bisons	2	1980	1981	—	—	—	—
Krefeld Condors	1	1981	1981	—	—	—	—
Neu Isenburg Adler	1	1980	1980	—	—	—	—
Kitzingen Colts	1	1980	1980	—	—	—	—

=== Key ===
Denotes club plays in the GFL 2019.	Denotes club plays in a league below the GFL in 2019.	Club defunct.

Club	Name of club
No	Number of seasons in league
First	First season in league
Last	Last season in league
PO	Play-off qualification
Div	Number of division titles won
Bowl	Number of German Bowls won
Seasons	Seasons German Bowls were won in

- ^{1} Played as Braunschweig Lions from 1987 to 2010, as Hygia Lions in 2011 and as New Yorker Lions since 2012.
- ^{2} Played as Kempten Comets from 1982 to 1993 and as Allgäu Comets since 1994.
- ^{3} Played as Rothenburg Knights from 1984 to 1994 and as Franken Knights since 1995.
- ^{4} Played as Nürnberg Rams from 1981 to 1997 and, again, since 2007. Played as Noris Rams from 1988 to 1998.
- ^{5} Played as Rüsselsheim Razorbacks from 1989 to 2002 and, again, from 2007 to 2010 and as Rhein Main Razorbacks from 2003 to 2006.
- ^{6} Played as Hilden Hurricanes from 1983 to 1989 and as Solingen Hurricanes from 1990 to 1998.
- ^{7} Played as Bonner Jets from 1982 to 1989 and as Troisdorf Jets since 1990.
- ^{8} Played as Augsburg Ants from 1986 to 1987 and as Königsbrunn Ants since 1988.

== Season placings ==
The placings in the league from its inaugural season in 1979 to the present one:

=== Bundesliga ===
The Bundesliga era from 1979 to 1998:

==== Single division ====
Six clubs competed in the inaugural 1979 season with the Frankfurter Löwen winning the league and the German Bowl. Runners-up in both were the Ansbach Grizzlies while the Berlin Bären, now the Berlin Adler came third and the Bremerhaven Seahawks, Munich Cowboys and Düsseldorf Panther followed behind in this order.

==== North ====
Bundesliga North	80	81	82	83	84	85	86	87	88	89	90	91	92	93	94	95	96	97	98
Braunschweig Lions															4	5	4	2	1
Hamburg Blue Devils																4	2	1	2
Cologne Crocodiles		2	1	2	2	3	4	2	4	3	3	2	2	1	3	3	3	3	3
Kiel Baltic Hurricanes																	5	4	4
Düsseldorf Panther			2	1	1	1	1	1	1	2	1	5	3	3	2	1	1	5	5
Paderborn Dolphins																			6
Berlin Adler		5	6	4	3	2	1	1	1	1	1	1	1	2	1	2	6	6	
Berlin Rebels													5	5	5	6			
Solingen Hurricanes							5	5	6	5	6			6	6				
Hamburg Silver Eagles													7	4	7				
Monheim Sharks						8	4	2	4	6	3	4	4	7					
Dortmund Giants		6				7	2	3	2	2	2	6	6	8					
Cologne Bears													7						
Red Barons Cologne				3	5	6	2	3	2	1	2	3							
Hildesheim Invaders											4	8							
Düsseldorf Bulldozer					4	5	6	6	3	3	4								
Assindia Cardinals							3	4	5	4	5								
Troisdorf Jets					6	4	3	5	3	4	5								
Bremen Buccaneers										5	6								
Ratingen Raiders									5	6									
Hamburg Dolphins				6	7		5	4	6										
Recklinghausen Chargers								6											
Bremerhaven Seahawks		3	3	7			6												
Essen Eagles			4	5															
Herne Tigers			5																
Solingen Steelers		4	7																
Mönchengladbach Mustangs			8																
Frankfurter Löwen	1	1																	
Krefeld Condors		7																	

==== South ====
Bundesliga South	80	81	82	83	84	85	86	87	88	89	90	91	92	93	94	95	96	97	98
Stuttgart Scorpions		4	5	6			6	6					8			4	3	6	1
Rüsselsheim Razorbacks																	5	5	2
Hanau Hawks		2	2		6	2	2	2	3	3	4	7		2	2	1	2	1	3
Munich Cowboys		3	4	2	2	4	4	4	6	2	1	2	1	1	1	3	4	3	4
Landsberg Express																		4	5
Noris Rams				3	7	3	3	1	3	1	3	1	3	4	3	2	1	2	6
Regensburg Royals													4	5	4	5			
Franken Knights							5	6						3	5	6			
Erding Bulls		7													6				
Allgäu Comets						6	2	3	2	6	4	5	5	6	7				
Badener Greifs							1	1	2	1	1	3	6	7					
Bad Homburg Falken		5	6		5	5	4	5	1	2	3	4	2	8					
Darmstadt Diamonds											2	6	7						
München Rangers								5	5	4	2	8							
Mainz Golden Eagles						8	5	3	5	4	5								
Ansbach Grizzlies	1	1	1	1	1	1	1	2	1	3	5								
Schwäbisch Hall Unicorns									4	5	6								
Würzburg Pumas									4	5	6								
Rüsselsheim Crusaders										6	7								
Fürth Buffalos											7								
Königsbrunn Ants										7									
Mannheim Redskins			7		3	7	3	4	6										
Nürnberg Vikings							6												
Frankfurter Löwen			3	4	4														
Starnberg Argonauts				5	8														
Straubing Bisons		6																	

=== GFL ===
The German Football League era from 1999 to present:

=== North ===
GFL North	99	00	01	02	03	04	05	06	07	08	09	10	11	12	13	14	15	16	17	18	19	~~20~~	21	22	23	24	25
Potsdam Royals																				5	6	*	2	1	1	1	1
Dresden Monarchs					4	3	3	3	6	4	3	3	5	3	2	2	2	2	3	2	2	*	1	5	2	2	2
Berlin Rebels												6		5	5	6	5	4	4	3	4	*	6	6	4	5	3
Kiel Baltic Hurricanes	3	4	6	6					3	1	2	1	1	1	3	4	3	3	2	6	7	*	5	7	7	6	4
New Yorker Lions	1	2	2	1	1	1	1	1	1	2	5	4	6	6	1	1	1	1	1	1	1	*	4	2	3	3	5
Düsseldorf Panther	5	3	3			5	6	6					3	4	7	7	7	8			8			8			6
Hildesheim Invaders																		5	7	7	3	*				4	7
Paderborn Dolphins	6																								6	7	8
Berlin Adler				4	3	2	4	5	2	3	1	2	4	2	4	5	6	7	8					4	5	w	
Cologne Crocodiles	4	1	4	3	5														5	4	5	*	3	3	w		
Elmshorn Fighting Pirates																						*					
Hamburg Huskies																	4	6	6	8							
Cologne Falcons							5	4	5	6					8	3	w										
Hamburg Blue Devils	2	5	1	2	2	4	2	2	4	5				7	6	w											
Lübeck Cougars														8													
Mönchengladbach Mavericks													2	inactive													
Assindia Cardinals			5	5	6						4	5	7														
Hannover Musketeers						6																					

=== South ===
GFL South	99	00	01	02	03	04	05	06	07	08	09	10	11	12	13	14	15	16	17	18	19	~~20~~	21	22	23	24	25
Ravensburg Razorbacks																						*	5	7	8	2	1
Munich Cowboys	2	1	1	6			5	6		3	6	5	4	8	3	4	5	6	7	4	7	*	3	2	5	5	2
Pforzheim Wilddogs																											3
Schwäbisch Hall Unicorns			4	4	3	2	2	3	3	5	1	2	1	1	1	1	1	1	1	1	1	*	1	1	1	1	4
Saarland Hurricanes			5	5	5	5	4	5	6				6	7	5	6	4	3	8				2	5	3	6	5
Straubing Spiders																								4	6	3	6
Allgäu Comets																5	2	4	5	3	6	*	4	3	2	4	7
Kirchdorf Wildcats																				7	8					7	w
Ingolstadt Dukes																			4	6	5	*			4	w	
Marburg Mercenaries					6	1	1	1	2	1	2	1	2	3	2	3	6	7	3	5	3	*	6	6	7		
Frankfurt Universe																		2	2	2	2	*	7	8			
Stuttgart Scorpions	4	4	2	2	4	3	3	2	1	2	3	4	3	4	6	2	3	5	6	8	4	*	8				
Rhein Neckar Bandits														2	4	7	7	8									
Franken Knights		3	6	3	2	4								5	7	8	8										
Wiesbaden Phantoms													5	6	8												
Plattling Black Hawks											5	3	7														
Weinheim Longhorns									4	4	4	6															
Darmstadt Diamonds								4	5	6																	
Rhein Main Razorbacks	1	2	3	1	1	w				inactive																	
Aschaffenburg Stallions	3	5																									
Landsberg Express	5	6																									
Hanau Hornets	6																										

=== Key ===
German Bowl winners	German Bowl runners up	Divisional champion	Play-off participation

- In 1979 the league was placed in a single division format with six clubs.
- League table for the 1980 season not available.
- From 1986 to 1990 the northern and southern divisions were subdivided into two divisions.
