= American Football Association of Germany =

Sports governing body

- Formation: 16 October 1982
- Type: American football
- Headquarters: Frankfurt, Germany
- Members: 63,060 (2018)
- Official language: German
- Website: AFVD.de

The American Football Association of Germany (German: American Football Verband Deutschland; AFVD) is the governing body of the sport of American football in Germany and the German Football League.

Formed in 1982, the association oversees the German league system, the various German Bowls and the national selections.

== History ==
The history of American football in Germany, outside the US Army bases in the country, began in 1977, when the Frankfurter Löwen were formed as the first club to play the game in Germany.

In March 1979, the AFBD, the American Football Federation of Germany (German: American Football Bund Deutschland), was formed, the first of its kind in Europe. This organisation, in 1982, was replaced by the AFVD, the American Football Association of Germany.

A national league, originally the American Football Bundesliga, later to be renamed the German Football League, was formed in 1979, consisting of six clubs, the Frankfurter Löwen, Ansbach Grizzlies, Düsseldorf Panther, Munich Cowboys, Berlin Bears and Bremerhaven Seahawks. The first-ever league game was held on 4 August 1979, and the Frankfurter Löwen defeated the Düsseldorf Panther 38 to 0, and ended in a victory for Frankfurt. The first ever German Bowl was held on 10 November 1979, with the Frankfurter Löwen defeating the Ansbach Grizzlies, 14 to 8.

In 1980 and 1981, the league and American football in Germany saw a split with Düsseldorf and Bremerhaven leaving the competition to take part in a separate, short-lived competition, the Nordwestdeutsche Football-Liga - NFL, but, by 1982, union was restored, and the renegade teams returned.

In 1981, the German national team was formed, winning its first-ever international, a game against Italy, 12–6.

On 16 October 1982, the AFVD was officially formed and, in the following year, it was decided to form regional associations as well. The German national team, also from 1983 onwards, started to participate in the European Championships. In 1986, women's American football began to develop, with the first official game held in 1987.

American football started to boom in Germany from the early 1990s onwards, initiated through the Frankfurt Galaxy, which attracted many younger fans to the sport and also provided some media attention.

As of 1 January 2010, the AFVD announced a new record membership of 40,051, and increase of 7.31 percent in comparison to the previous year. The associations growth since the year 2000, when it had 18,875 members, is mainly due to the improved youth programs of its clubs. While, in the early years, very few clubs had a youth team, it is now commonplace to have a number of junior teams in every club.

In 2018, the AFVD reached a new peak by counting 63,060 members.

With triumphs in the European Championships of American Football 2001, 2010 and again 2014 as well as dominant performances of German club teams in the BIG6 European Football League since its inception in 2014, the AFVD has established itself as one of the premier American Football associations in Europe.

== League system ==
The league system in American football in Germany operates as a pyramid, with clubs in every league being able to achieve promotion and relegation, subject to their final standings and the promotion and relegation games.

=== Men ===
In 2010, the pyramid consisted of six levels, however, tier six leagues did only exist in some regions.

The top level of the league system, the GFL, is a national league with inter conference games between the two regional divisions. The second level, the GFL2, is divided into two regional divisions without inter conference games. The third level is the Regionalliga (English: Regional League), divided into five separate leagues. Below this, the seven Oberligas (English: Premier League) are set, followed by the Verbandsligas (English: Association League), Landesligas (English: State League) and Aufbauligas (English: Development League):

Level	League						
I	German Football League; Northern Division; 8 clubs Southern Division; 8 clubs						
II	German Football League 2 Northern Division; 8 clubs Southern Division; 8 clubs						
III	Regionalliga North; 8 clubs		Regionalliga West; 6 clubs	Regionalliga East; 9 clubs	Regionalliga Central; 7 clubs	Regionalliga Southern West; 8 clubs	Regionalliga South; 6 clubs
IV	Oberliga North-HH/SH; 5 clubs	Oberliga North-LS/B; 4 clubs	Oberliga NRW; 6 clubs	Oberliga East; 6 clubs	Oberliga HE/RP/SA; 7 clubs	Oberliga Baden-Württemberg; 7 clubs	Bayernliga; 12 clubs
V	Verbandsliga North-HH/SH; 4 clubs	Verbandsliga North-LS/B; North; 4 clubs South; 4 clubs	Verbandsliga NRW; 5 clubs	Oberliga East; 7 clubs	Landesliga Central; 6 clubs	Landesliga Baden-Württemberg; 8 clubs	Verbandsliga Bavaria; North; 6 clubs South; 5 clubs
VI			Landesliga NRW; North; 4 clubs South; 4 clubs			Bezirksliga Baden-Württemberg; 6 clubs	Aufbauliga Bavaria; 5 clubs

==== Legend ====
- HH/SH: Hamburg/Schleswig-Holstein
- LS/B: Lower Saxony/Bremen
- NRW: North Rhine-Westphalia
- HE/RP/SA: Hesse/Rhineland-Palatinate/Saarland
