= Bad Homburg Falken =

- Founded: 1980
- Folded: 1995
- League: defunct
- Based in: Bad Homburg
- Arena: Sportplatz am Massenheimer Weg Sportzentrum Nord-West
- Colors: Red and White
- Championships: none

The Bad Homburg Falken were an American football team from Bad Homburg, Germany. The club's greatest success has been promotion to the American football Bundesliga, now the German Football League, in 1980 and 1983 where it played for 12 seasons until 1993. In this era it qualified for the play-offs on five occasions, winning the southern division of the league in 1988.

== History ==
The Bad Homburg Falken were formed in 1980 by Alexander Sperber, son of a U.S. Army soldier and a German mother. Sperber has previously formed the Frankfurter Löwen, Germany's first American football club and been instrumental in creating an American football league in Germany. A large number of founding members of the new club came from the Neu-Isenburg Adler, formed shortly before.

The new club adopted the colours and crest of the Atlanta Falcons, Falken being the German word for Falcons. The Bad Homburg Falken secured the marketing rights in Germany, thereby preventing any Atlanta Falcons's merchandise from being sold in Germany.

The Falken entered the Bundesliga in 1981 and played in the League until 1993.

Bad Homburg experienced its most successful era from 1988 to 1992 when the club qualified for the play-offs in five consecutive seasons. The 1988 season saw it take out a division title but the club was knocked out in the quarter-finals of the play-offs, a fate it suffered in 1989, 1991 and 1992 as well. In between, in 1990, the Falken reached the semi-finals after a quarter final win over München Rangers but lost there to the eventual champions Berlin Adler. The club's success was however partly based on an increasing number of U.S. import players, forcing the club into financial trouble.

The club suffered a rapid decline after its most successful era, finishing last in its division in 1993 and being relegated to the 2. Bundesliga. At this level, too the team finished last, winning just one game all season and consequently the Bad Homburg Falken folded following before the start of the 1995 season.

== Honours ==
- Bundesliga
  - Southern Division champions: (1) 1988
  - Play-off qualification: (5) 1988–1992
  - League membership: (13) 1981–1993
