= Danny Langsdorf =

American football coach (born 1972)

Current position
- Title: Wide receivers coach
- Team: Ohio
- Conference: MAC

Biographical details
- Born: June 28, 1972 (age 54); Fargo, North Dakota, U.S.

Playing career
- 1991–1993: Boise State
- 1994–1995: Linfield
- 1996: Deggendorf Black Hawks
- Position: Quarterback

Coaching career (HC unless noted)
- 1996: Cal Lutheran (GA)
- 1997–1998: Oregon State (TE)
- 1999: Edmonton Eskimos (WR)
- 2000–2001: Edmonton Eskimos (OC/QB)
- 2002: New Orleans Saints (OA/QC)
- 2003–2004: New Orleans Saints (asst. WR/ST)
- 2005–2013: Oregon State (OC/QB)
- 2014: New York Giants (QB)
- 2015–2017: Nebraska (OC/QB)
- 2018: Oregon (OA)
- 2019: Fresno State (QB)
- 2020–2021: Colorado (PGC/QB)
- 2022–2024: Temple (OC/QB)
- 2025: Oregon State (OQC)
- 2026–present: Ohio (WR)

Daniel Edward Langsdorf (born June 28, 1972) is an American football coach and former player who is currently the wide receiver for the Ohio. He was previously the offensive coordinator for the Temple Owls, Oregon State Beavers and the Nebraska Cornhuskers.

== Early life ==
Langsdorf grew up in McMinnville, Oregon and played quarterback for McMinnville High School. Upon graduating from high school, Langsdorf chose to play football at Boise State University. In his time there, from 1991 to 1993, he lettered one season and earned Big Sky Conference All-Academic honors as a sophomore.

After three seasons at Boise State, he transferred to Linfield College in McMinnville and became the Wildcats' starting quarterback in 1994 and 1995. At Linfield, playing for his father Ed Langsdorf, he was selected to the All-Northwest Conference Team as a junior after passing for 2,055 yards and 24 touchdowns. Langsdorf also set a then-school record with 493 passing yards against Southern Oregon on Nov. 12, 1994. After battling with injuries his senior season, Langsdorf concluded his two-year career at Linfield with 2,724 yards, completing 195 of 356 pass attempts. He graduated from Linfield in 1995 with a bachelor's degree in exercise science.

== Germany ==
For the 1996 season, Langsdorf signed and played quarterback overseas for the Deggendorf Black Hawks in the Regionalliga Süd (Regional League South 3rd division/tier) in Germany.

== Coaching career ==
=== Early Start ===
Langsdorf began his college coaching career in 1996 at California Lutheran University in Thousand Oaks. In 1997, Langsdorf came to Oregon State as a graduate assistant. During these first two years at Oregon State he worked with the offense, particularly focusing on the tight ends. He was part of the coaching team that transformed the offense from the wishbone to a multiple set.

=== Edmonton Eskimos (CFL) ===
After completing his two years as a graduate assistant, Langsdorf coached with the Edmonton Eskimos of the Canadian Football League (CFL). Langsdorf was the wide receivers coach in 1999 before becoming the Eskimos' quarterbacks coach from 2000 to 2001. His guidance helped the Eskimos lead the CFL in total yards in 2001 with 6,606.

=== New Orleans Saints (NFL) ===
In 2002, Langsdorf went to coach for the New Orleans Saints of the National Football League (NFL). With the Saints, he was the offensive assistant/quality control coach in 2002 and the assistant wide receivers/special teams coach in 2003 and 2004.'

=== Oregon State ===
Langsdorf's second tenure at Oregon State began in 2005 when he was hired by Mike Riley to become the offensive coordinator for the Oregon State Beavers.

=== New York Giants (NFL) ===
On January 24, 2014, Langsdorf was hired by the New York Giants as their quarterbacks coach. Under his watch, quarterback Eli Manning completed a career-best 63.1 percent of his passes that season, as well as the second-highest passer rating and yardage of his career.

=== Nebraska ===
On January 15, 2015, Langsdorf was hired by the Nebraska Cornhuskers as their offensive coordinator and quarterbacks coach.

=== Oregon ===
Langsdorf spent the 2018 season as an offensive analyst for the Oregon Ducks football program before joining Jeff Tedford's staff as their quarterbacks coach.

=== UNLV ===
On January 9, 2020, Langsdorf was hired by former Oregon Ducks offensive coordinator and current UNLV head coach Marcus Arroyo to serve as the passing game coordinator and quarterbacks coach for the Rebels.

=== Colorado ===
On March 4, almost two months after being hired by UNLV, Langsdorf departed the Rebels coaching staff to join Karl Dorrell's staff at Colorado.

=== Temple ===
In January 2022, Langsdorf was hired to be Stan Drayton's offensive coordinator at Temple.

=== Ohio ===
On March 16, 2026, Langsdorf was hired to be John Hauser's wide receiver coach at Ohio.

== Personal life ==
Langsdorf is married to the former Michele Bertrand, a softball standout at Linfield who still appears in the school record books for her pitching prowess.

In May 2007, Langsdorf underwent surgery to donate a kidney to Laurie Cavanaugh. Laurie is married to offensive line coach Mike Cavanaugh, who coached with Langsdorf at Oregon State at the time.
