= 1979 American football Bundesliga =

- League: American football Bundesliga
- Sport: American football
- Duration: 4 August–10 November 1979
- Teams: 6

Regular season
- Bundesliga champions: Frankfurter Löwen
- Bundesliga runners-up: Ansbach Grizzlies

German Bowl I
- Champions: Frankfurter Löwen
- Runners-up: Ansbach Grizzlies

GFL seasons
- 1980 →

The 1979 American football Bundesliga season was the first edition of the top-level American football competition in West Germany.

In the inaugural season six clubs competed in the league. At the end of the regular season the Frankfurter Löwen contested the first-ever German Bowl against the Ansbach Grizzlies and won 14–8.

== Modus ==
Location of teams in the American football Bundesliga 1979

During the regular season each club played all other clubs home and away. The best two teams after the regular season then contested the German Bowl.

== Season overview ==
The formation of the league dates back to a German TV interview with Alexander Sperber, son of a U.S. Army soldier and German mother, which created enough interest to form a number of teams and the league in March 1979.

The league's opening game was held on 4 August 1979 in Düsseldorf when the Düsseldorf Panther hosted the Frankfurter Löwen in front of 4,400 spectators and lost 0–38.

The regular season saw the Frankfurter Löwen win all their nine-season games, the tenth game, the home game against the Berlin Bären having been cancelled. Behind Frankfurt the Ansbach Grizzlies finished runners-up, undefeated by the other four teams but unable to overcome the Löwen . At the end of the table the Düsseldorf Panther remained winless all season. In the inaugural German Bowl, held in Frankfurt on 10 November 1979, the Löwen defeated Ansbach once more to take out the first-ever German championship.

== League table ==
The league table of the American football Bundesliga:

American football Bundesliga
P	Team	G	W	T	L	PF	PA	PCT
1	Frankfurter Löwen	9	9	0	0	493	177	1.000
2	Ansbach Grizzlies	10	8	0	2	243	44	0.800
3	Berlin Bären	9	4	1	4	146	83	0.500
4	Bremerhaven Seahawks	10	4	1	5	112	114	0.450
5	München Cowboys	10	3	0	7	90	224	0.300
6	Düsseldorf Panther	10	0	0	10	38	297	0.000

=== Key ===
Qualified for play-offs

== Aftermath ==
The 1979 season remained the only season of the American football Bundesliga, renamed to German Football League in 1999, to be played in single-division format. From 1980 onwards the league was subdivided into regional divisions, predominantly north and south.

The Frankfurter Löwen continued their dominance in 1980, winning another title but then declined and folded in 1985. The Ansbach Grizzlies went on to play in each of the first eight German Bowls, winning the 1981, 1982 and 1985 editions. The club declined from there, dropped out of the league in 1990 and never returned to the highest level of play. The Bremerhaven Seahawks and Düsseldorf Panther briefly left the league after the 1979 season to join a rival competition but returned soon after. The Seahawks dropped out of the league in 1986 and, like Ansbach, never returned. The Panther, alongside the Berlin Bären, soon renamed to Berlin Adler, and the Munich Cowboys became more permanent features of the league, dropping out of the league on occasions but still spending more seasons in the league than any other club and winning thirteen German Bowls between them.
