= Assindia Cardinals =

Sports club

- Founded: 1983
- League: German Football League 2
- Based in: Essen, Germany
- Stadium: Sportpark am Hallo
- Colors: Blue and Yellow
- President: Wilfried Ziegler
- Head coach: Bernd Janzen
- Championships: none
- Cheerleaders: Cardinellas
- Website: assindia-cardinals.de

The Assindia Cardinals are an American football team from Essen, Germany. Assindia is the Latin name for Essen.

As its greatest success, the club has finished in third place in the northern division of the American Football Bundesliga in 1986, and reached the quarter-finals of the national championship once, in 2009.

== History ==
The club was formed in 1983 as the AFC Assindia Cardinals 1983 e.V..

The new club entered the tier-three Oberliga Nord for the 1984 season, where it finishes third and earned promotion to the northern division of the 2nd Bundesliga. Another third place in 1985 was enough to qualify for the American Football Bundesliga, now the German Football League, as the league was expanded from 16 to 24 teams for the 1986 season.

The Cardinals came third in their inaugural season at this level in group B of the northern division, the league being then subdivided into four regional divisions, which qualified the team for the play-offs. There, the Red Barons Cologne proved to strong and the team was knocked-out in a 0–18 defeat. The following four seasons, the club was unable to qualify for the play-offs again, finishing in fourth and fifth places, before a league reduction from 26 to 16 teams caused the Cardinals to lose their league spot in very similar circumstances to the way it had gained it originally.

The team, instead of entering the 2nd Bundesliga, found itself now playing in the tier-four Verbandsliga NRW and, for the club, an era of lower division football was to follow. For the next eight seasons, the Cardinals drifted between the third and fourth tier, before a Regionalliga West championship in 1998 allowed the team to return to the second level.

After only two seasons in the 2nd Bundesliga, the Cardinals won the northern division in this league and earned direct promotion to the GFL. Live at this level proved difficult for the side and it was never a true play-off contender. A last place in 2003 and subsequent loses to the Düsseldorf Panther in the relegation round meant a return to the second tier for the Cardinals. From 2004 to 2007, the team moved between this league and the Regionalliga as an elevator side, before another title in the 2nd Bundesliga in 2008 and promotion round victories over Cologne Falcons allowed a return to the GFL.

The club made a successful comeback in the league in 2009, finishing fourth and qualifying for the play-offs for the second time in its history, where it lost to the Schwäbisch Hall Unicorns in the quarter-finals. The 2010 season saw the side back in familiar territory, finishing fifth, a point and a place above the relegation rank.

The club finished last in the northern division of the GFL in 2011 and elected not to play a relegation decider against the GFL 2 runners-up. Instead, feeling unable to financially compete at the highest level, the Cardinals voluntarily accepted relegation. In 2012, the club suffered another relegation after coming last in the GFL 2 northern division. The 2013 and 2014 seasons saw the club compete in the Regionalliga West, where it came third on both occasions, followed by a league championship in 2015 which took them back to the GFL 2.

== Honours ==
- GFL
  - Play-off qualification : 1986, 2009
  - League membership : (11) 1986–1990, 2001–2003, 2009–2011
- GFL 2
  - Northern Division champions: 2000, 2008

== Recent seasons ==
Recent seasons of the club:

Year	Division	Finish	Points	Pct.	Games	W	D	L	PF	PA	Postseason
2005	Regionalliga West	1st	22–2	0.917	12	11	0	1	462	140	Won PR: Frankfurt Red Cocks (27–0 & 12–0)
2006	GFL2 (North)	7th	3–21	0.125	12	1	1	10	122	246	—
2007	Regionalliga West	1st	22–2	0.917	12	11	0	1	362	63	Won PR: Magdeburg Virgin Guards (7–14 & 21–13)
2008	GFL2 (North)	1st	21–7	0.750	14	10	1	3	321	217	Won PR: Cologne Falcons (24–17 & 28–23)
2009	GFL (North)	4th	8–12	0.400	10	4	0	6	279	268	Lost QF: Schwäbisch Hall Unicorns (25–46)
2010	GFL (North)	5th	9–15	0.375	12	4	1	7	239	275	—
2011	GFL (North)	7th	3–25	0.107	14	1	1	12	162	532	—
2012	GFL2 (North)	8th	4–24	0.143	14	1	2	11	137	482	—
2013	Regionalliga West	3rd	12–8	0.600	10	6	0	4	230	138	—
2014	Regionalliga West	3rd	10–6	0.625	8	5	0	3	311	119	—
2015	Regionalliga West	1st	18–2	0.900	10	9	0	1	260	125	Won PR: Ritterhude Badgers (43–0) Won PR: Rostock Griffins (14–7)
2016	GFL2 (North)	6th	8–20	0.286	14	4	0	10	277	414	—
2017	GFL2 (North)	8th	4–24	0.143	14	2	0	12	216	499	—
2018	Regionalliga West	4th	14–10	0.583	12	7	0	5	282	189	—
2019	Regionalliga West	1st	22–2	0.917	12	11	0	1	451	119	Won PR: Berlin Adler (21–17) Won PR: Oldenburg Knights (19–16)
2020	GFL2 (North)	No season played because of the COVID-19 pandemic									
2021	GFL2 (North)	8th	2–18	0.100	10	1	0	9	147	302	—
2022	GFL2 (North)	7th	6–14	0.300	10	3	0	7	177	259	—

- PR = Promotion round
- RR = Relegation round
- QF = Quarter finals
- SF = Semi finals
