= Berlin Adler =

German American football team

- Founded: 1979
- League: Regionalliga
- Team history: Berliner Bären (1979–1981) Berlin Adler (1981–present)
- Based in: Berlin, Germany
- Stadium: Poststadion
- Colors: Yellow and Black
- Head coach: Ben Rosin
- Championships: Eurobowl: 2010, 2014 EFAF Cup: 2008 German Bowl: 1987, 1989, 1990, 1991, 2004, 2009 Ladies Bowl: 1993–1997, 2000–2004
- Cheerleaders: Aces
- Website: berlinadler.de

The Berlin Adler (English: Berlin Eagles) is an American football club based in Berlin, Germany. The club is one of the most successful clubs in the sport in Germany, having won six German Bowls as well as ten Ladies Bowls and five Junior Bowls.

Internationally, the club has participated in the European Football League (EFL) on several occasions, and has won the Eurobowl in 2010 and 2014.

As of 2015, the club is second only to the Munich Cowboys (405) in German Football League (GFL) games played, with 378, one of only three teams with more than 300 league games. The Cowboys have played 35 out of a possible 38 seasons at the highest level of the game in Germany – the Adler four fewer, with 31.

== History ==
=== Foundation years ===
Berlin Adler helmet design.

The club was formed as the second American football club in Berlin on 12 February 1979, then under the name of Berliner Bären (English: Berlin Bears). Shortly after its formation, the club was joined by the Berlin Bats, increasing the number of club members substantially. In the early days, all training was carried out on the facilities of the US Army and supervised by US soldiers stationed in Berlin.

In 1979, the Bears became a founding member of the American Football Bundesliga, renamed the German Football League in 1999, together with the Frankfurter Löwen, Düsseldorf Panther, Ansbach Grizzlies, Munich Cowboys und Bremerhaven Seahawks.

The Bears came third in their first season in competitive football, but was unable to make the playoffs in its first four seasons. To improve on-the-field performance, the team decided to join established club BSC Wilmersdorf in 1981, changing its club colors and name, becoming the Berlin Adler.

=== First success ===
The Adler began to improve in 1983, qualifying for the playoffs for the first time. A youth department was formed and the team changed mother clubs, now joining BSC Rehberge, to gain a permanent home ground. The Adler moved into the Radrennstadion Schöneberg in 1986 as their home ground and earned their first German title the following year. After remaining unbeaten all season in 1987, the team defeated the Badener Greifs in the German Bowl, held in front of a sell-out crowd of 14,800 at Mommsenstadion in Berlin.

The team's first entry in the EFL in 1988 ended in the semi-finals, losing narrowly to the Amsterdam Crusaders but, in 1989, the club returned to success, winning its second German Bowl, again undefeated all season, against the Red Barons Cologne.

=== Dominance ===
The Adler became a dominating team in Germany, achieving a 966-day unbeaten run, which only came to a halt in a league game against the Cologne Crocodiles in 1991. Before and after, the Adler defeated the Crocodiles in the German Bowl in 1990 and 1991. In European competition, the club reached the semi-finals in 1990 and the final in 1991, once more losing to the Amsterdam Crusaders.

After three titles in series from 1989 to 1991, the Adler declined somewhat but remained a strong side, still reaching the semi-finals in each of the following four seasons. In 1994, the club made its fifth German Bowl appearance, but lost for the first time, against the Düsseldorf Panther. In 1995, the club still had a strong season, but declined markedly after that.

=== Decline ===
The 1996 season saw the Adler in the unfamiliar position of having to combat relegation and being troubled by financial problems. It came sixth and last in its division, and had to take part in the relegation round. The team assured its survival in two games against local rival Berlin Rebels. The following season proved worse, however; the Adler could not win a league game all season, had to play in the relegation round once more and, after winning the first game against the Paderborn Dolphins, lost the second and were relegated to the 2nd Bundesliga.

=== Recovery ===
The club spent the next four seasons at the second level of German football, slowly rebuilding. It moved from its old ground to the Friedrich-Ludwig-Jahn-Sportpark and, in 2001, managed to win its division, entitling the team to take part in the promotion round. After playing and losing to the Kiel Baltic Hurricanes, promotion was seemingly missed, but the withdrawal of the Düsseldorf Panther from the GFL opened up a spot in the league for the Adler and the team was back at the highest level for 2002.

Berlin, in the meantime, had acquired an NFL Europe team in 1999, the Berlin Thunder, a club that lasted until 2007, when the league folded.

=== Return to success ===
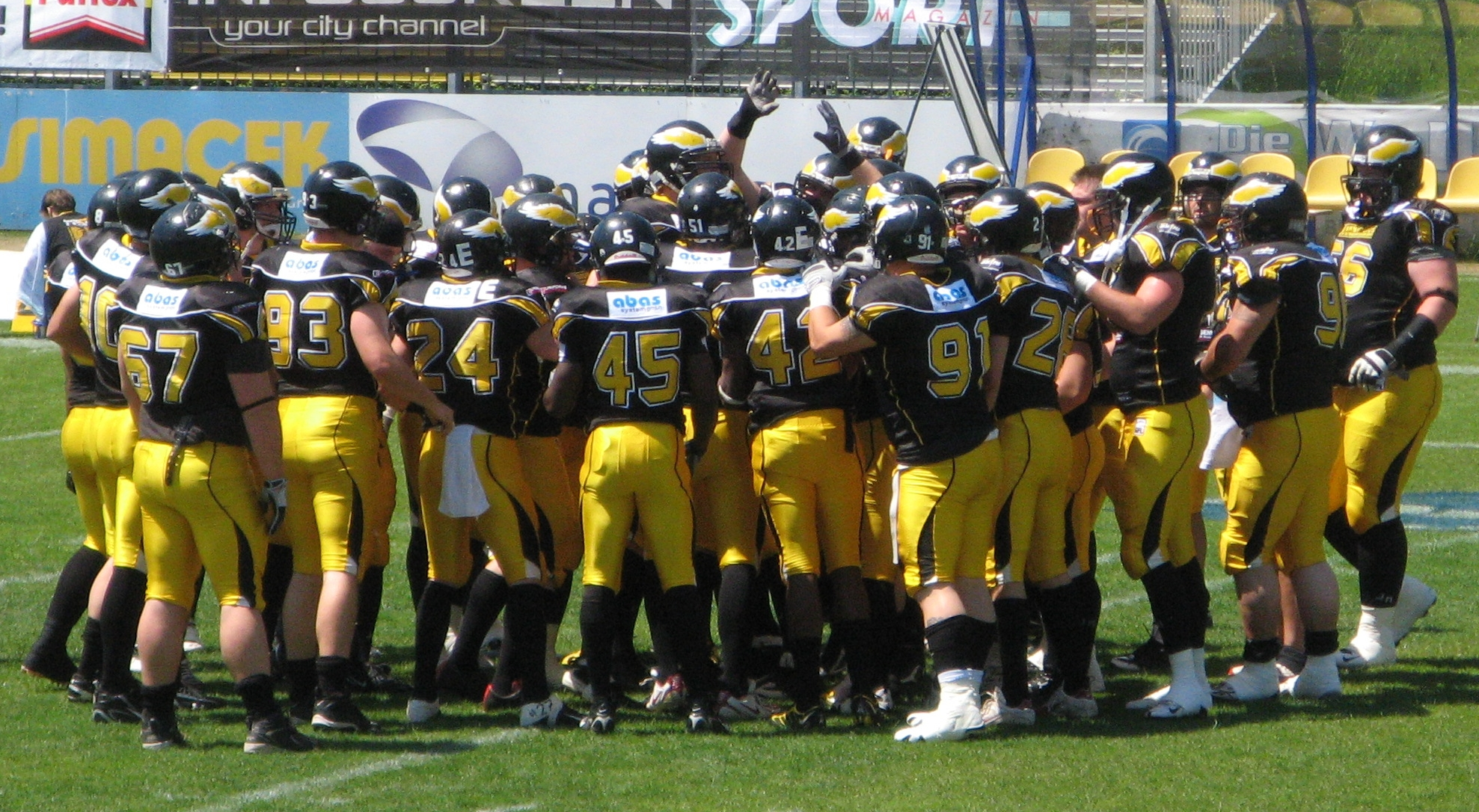
The Berlin Adler at the Eurobowl XXIV in 2010.

The Adler once more became a successful side in the German Football League, reaching the semi-finals in their first two seasons there. In 2004, the team ended the club's 13-year title drought, defeating the Braunschweig Lions in a low-scoring German Bowl.

After this, the club experienced two lean seasons, being knocked out in the quarter-finals in 2005 and having to play against relegation in 2006 but successfully avoiding the relegation round in the end.

The team did not decline further, as it had done in the 1990s, but instead reached the semi-finals in 2007 and 2008. In 2007, the side lost narrowly to the Stuttgart Scorpions, in 2008 they lost to the Kiel Baltic Hurricanes, a team it was to meet in the following two German Bowls. In Europe, the Berlin Adler won the EFAF Cup, a second-tier competition, against the Parma Panthers of Italy, the club's first international title.

In 2009, the Adler had another successful season, losing only one league game and advancing to their seventh German Bowl, earning their sixth national title by defeating the Kiel Baltic Hurricanes 28–21. The 2010 season saw a repeat of this final, but this time Kiel was the stronger side and won their first national title. The Adler however achieved their second European success, finally winning the Eurobowl for the first time.

The 2011 season was not as successful for the club, making a losing appearance in the Eurobowl, finishing only fourth in the league and going out in the quarter-finals of the playoffs to the Schwäbisch Hall Unicorns. In 2012, the club came second in the northern division of the GFL and qualified for the play-off where it was knocked out by the Schwäbisch Hall Unicorns in the semi-finals. The team again reached the semi-finals of the playoffs in 2013, this time losing to the Dresden Monarchs.

In 2014, the club took part in a new European competition, the BIG6 European Football League, which consisted of three teams from Germany, two from Austria and one from Switzerland, the clubs being Berlin Adler, New Yorker Lions, Dresden Monarchs, Raiffeisen Vikings Vienna, Swarco Raiders Tirol and the Calanda Broncos. The two best teams in this competition advanced to the Eurobowl XXVIII. Berlin won this competition when it defeated the New Yorker Lions 20–17 in the 2014 final. In the GFL the club finished fifth in 2014 and thereby missed out on play-off qualification, repeated in 2015 when it came sixth.

=== Financial troubles and decline ===
The financial situation of the Berlin Adler began to deteriorate during this era, however, the fact that other teams failed to get a license to play in the GFL kept them from being relegated for several years, until they had to face the relegation round after the 2017 season, as fate would have it, against the Potsdam Royals. As Berlin lost that game, they found themselves in GFL2 for the following season, failing to stabilize the on-field situation, culminating with yet another relegation to the third tier.

== Honours ==
=== Men ===
- Eurobowl
  - Champions: 2010, 2014
  - Runners-up: 1991, 2011
- EFAF Cup:
  - Champions: 2008
- German Bowl
  - Champions: 1987, 1989, 1990, 1991, 2004, 2009
  - Runners-up: 1994, 2010
- EFL
  - Participations: (10) 1988, 1990–1992, 1996, 2009–2013
- BIG6 European Football League
  - Participations: 2014–present
- GFL
  - Northern Division champions: (9) 1986–1992, 1994, 2009
  - Play-off qualification : (25) 1983–1995, 2002–2005, 2007–2013, 2022
  - League membership : (38) 1979–1997, 2002–2017, 2022–2024
- GFL2
  - Northern Division champions: 2001, 2021

=== Women ===
- Ladies Bowl
  - Champions: (10) 1993–1997, 2000–2004
  - Runners-up: 1999

=== Juniors ===
- Junior Bowl
  - Champions: 1989, 1990, 1994, 1997, 2009
  - Runners-up: 2006
- Junior Flag Bowl
  - Champions: 2007

== German Bowl appearances ==
The club's appearances in the German Bowl:

Bowl	Date	Champions	Runners-Up	Score	Location	Attendance
IX	October 11, 1987	Berlin Adler	Badener Greifs	37–12	Berlin	14,000
XI	October 21, 1989	Berlin Adler	Red Barons Cologne	30–23	Nuremberg	10,500
XII	October 20, 1990	Berlin Adler	Cologne Crocodiles	50–38	Düsseldorf	10,000
XIII	October 5, 1991	Berlin Adler	Cologne Crocodiles	22–21	Hamburg	13,000
XVI	September 17, 1994	Düsseldorf Panther	Berlin Adler	27–17	Hanau	7,862
XXVI	October 9, 2004	Berlin Adler	Braunschweig Lions	10–7	Braunschweig	17,200
XXXI	October 3, 2009	Berlin Adler	Kiel Baltic Hurricanes	28–21	Frankfurt	14,234
XXXII	October 9, 2010	Kiel Baltic Hurricanes	Berlin Adler	17–10	Frankfurt	11,121

== Recent seasons ==
Recent seasons of the Berlin Adler:

Year	Division	Finish	Points	Pct.	Games	W	D	L	PF	PA	Postseason
2005	GFL (North)	4th	12–12	0.500	12	6	0	6	376	356	Lost QF: Marburg Mercenaries (21–40)
2006	GFL (North)	5th	8–16	0.333	12	4	0	8	196	234	—
2007	GFL (North)	2nd	16–8	0.667	12	8	0	4	267	136	Won QF: Schwäbisch Hall Unicorns (23–3) Lost SF: Stuttgart Scorpions (14–19)
2008	GFL (North)	3rd	16–8	0.667	12	7	2	3	141	108	Won QF: Stuttgart Scorpions (9–6) Lost SF: Kiel Baltic Hurricanes (12–17)
2009	GFL (North)	1st	18–2	0.900	10	9	0	1	252	91	Won QF: Weinheim Longhorns (30–13) Won SF: Marburg Mercenaries (36–21) Won GB: Kiel Baltic Hurricanes (28–21)
2010	GFL (North)	2nd	20–4	0.833	12	10	0	2	303	198	Won QF: Plattling Black Hawks (17–3) Won SF: Marburg Mercenaries (17–6) Lost GB: Kiel Baltic Hurricanes (10–17)
2011	GFL (North)	4th	14–14	0.500	14	7	0	7	368	296	Lost QF: Schwäbisch Hall Unicorns (27–53)
2012	GFL (North)	2nd	22–6	0.786	14	11	0	3	412	294	Won QF: Marburg Mercenaries (35–21) Lost SF: Schwäbisch Hall Unicorns (21–38)
2013	GFL (North)	4th	14–14	0.500	14	7	0	7	332	342	Won QF: Schwäbisch Hall Unicorns (42–13) Lost SF: Dresden Monarchs (21–32)
2014	GFL (North)	5th	12–12	0.500	12	6	0	6	321	285	—
2015	GFL (North)	6th	4–20	0.167	12	2	0	10	145	469	—
2016	GFL (North)	7th	6–22	0.214	14	3	0	11	296	643	—
2017	GFL (North)	8th	2–26	0.071	14	1	0	13	163	659	Lost RR: Potsdam Royals
2018	GFL2 (North)	8th	4–24	0.143	14	2	0	12	226	421	—
2019	Regionalliga (Ost)	1st	23–1	0.958	12	11	1	0	485	111	Won LF: Magdeburg Virgin Guards (38–3 & 27–0) Won PR: Oldenburg Knights (30–7) & Assindia Cardinals (17–21)
2020	GFL2 (North)	No season played because of the COVID-19 pandemic									
2021	GFL2 (North)	1st	17–1	0.944	9	8	1	0	409	171	—
2022	GFL (North)	4th	12–8	0.600	10	6	0	4	326	318	Lost QF: Schwäbisch Hall Unicorns (21–35)
2023	GFL (North)	5th	10–14	0.417	12	5	0	7	286	341	—
2024	GFL (North)	8th	0–24	0.000	12	0	0	12	0	432	withdrew during the season

- LF = League Final
- RR = Relegation round.
- PR = Promotion round.
- QF = Quarterfinals.
- SF = Semifinals.
- GB = German Bowl.
