= München Rangers =

American football team in Germany

- Founded: 1981
- League: German Football League 2
- Based in: Munich
- Stadium: Dantestadion
- Colors: Orange and Black
- Owner: Footballclub München 1981 München Rangers e.V.
- President: Dennis Kunze
- Head coach: Chris Stamblewski
- Website: www.muenchen-rangers.de/

The München Rangers are an American football team from Munich (German: München), Germany.

The club had its most successful era between 1987 and 1991 when it played in the American Football-Bundesliga, now the German Football League and qualified for the play-offs just once, in 1990. After more than two decades in regional football leagues the club made a return to the national leagues when it won promotion to the German Football League 2, the second tier of league football in Germany, in 2014.

== History ==
The club was formed in 1981 out of the youth team of the Munich Cowboys.

The Rangers entered league football in 1983 in the 2. Bundesliga Süd, now the German Football League 2, where it won a division title in 1986 and promotion to the American Football-Bundesliga. During these early years the club also reached the German Junior Bowl on two occasions, in 1983 and 1984, but lost both games.

The club played in the southern division of the Bundesliga for the next five seasons, a league where their local rival, the Munich Cowboys, also played. With the exception of the 1990 season, when it reached the play-offs and lost to the Bad Homburg Falken in the first round the Rangers were never a strong side. In 1991 the club came eighth and last in its league and was relegated. The following season, back in the 2. Bundesliga Süd, the club suffered another relegation and disappeared into regional football.

Rangers played in the Bavarian league, the Bayernliga, for the following seasons until dropping out of league football altogether at the end of the 1997 season. The club focused on rebuilding in 1999 and 2000 and rejoined league football in 2001, now in the tier five Landesliga. It returned to the Bayernliga the season after, dropped to the fifth tier once more in 2004 and then played in the Bayernliga until 2012.

The club enjoyed a revival from 2012 onwards, winning the southern division of the Bayernliga that year. It was promoted from there to the tier three Regionalliga Süd where it finished fourth in its first season. A second place in the league in 2014 allowed the Rangers to participate in the promotion round to the German Football League 2 and, after to wins over the Albershausen Crusaders, a team previously unbeaten, the club was promoted. The club finished last in the southern division of the GFL 2 in 2015.

== Honours ==
- GFL
  - League membership: (5) 1987–1991
  - Play-off qualification: 1990
- 2. Bundesliga
  - Southern Division champions: 1986
- German Junior Bowl
  - Runners-up: 1983, 1984

== Recent seasons ==
Recent seasons of the Rangers:

Year	Division	Finish	Points	Pct.	Games	W	D	L	PF	PA	Postseason
2012	Bayernliga Süd; 4th level	1st	18–2	0.900	10	9	0	1	236	102	Won PR-SF: Landsberg X-Press (27–12) Won PR-F: Feldkirchen Lions (20–8)
2013	Regionalliga Süd; 3rd level	4th	10–10	0.500	10	5	0	5	190	221	—
2014	Regionalliga Süd; 3rd level	2nd	18–6	0.750	12	9	0	3	462	184	Won PR: Albershausen Crusaders (22–7 & 28–13)
2015	GFL 2 (South)	8th	2–26	0.071	14	1	0	13	255	559	—
2016	GFL 2 (South)	8th	0–28	0.000	14	0	0	14	124	596	—
2017	Regionalliga Süd; 3rd level	2nd	18–6	0.750	12	9	0	3	529	336	—
2018	Regionalliga Süd; 3rd level	2nd	18–4	0.818	11	9	0	2	421	260	—
2019	Regionalliga Süd; 3rd level	3rd	12–8	0.600	10	6	0	4	351	331	Lost PR-SF: Nürnberg Rams (28–35)

- PR = Promotion round.
- QF = Quarter finals.
- SF = Semi finals.
