= 2011 German Football League =

- League: German Football League
- Sport: American football
- Duration: 9 April–8 October 2011
- Number of teams: 14
- Promoted to GFL: Berlin Rebels, Franken Knights, Hamburg Blue Devils, Rhein-Neckar Bandits
- Relegated to GFL2: Assindia Cardinals, Plattling Black Hawks

Regular season
- GFL North champions: Kiel Baltic Hurricanes
- GFL North runners-up: Mönchengladbach Mavericks
- GFL South champions: Schwäbisch Hall Unicorns
- GFL South runners-up: Marburg Mercenaries

German Bowl XXXIII
- Champions: Schwäbisch Hall Unicorns
- Runners-up: Kiel Baltic Hurricanes

GFL seasons
- ← 2010 2012 →

The 2011 German Football League season was the thirty third edition of the top-level American football competition in Germany and twelfth since the renaming to German Football League.

== League tables ==
The league tables of the two GFL divisions:

=== North ===
Pos	Team	Pld	W	D	L	PF	PA	PD	PCT	Qualification or relegation
1	Kiel Baltic Hurricanes	14	12	0	2	444	224	+220	.857	Qualification to play-offs
2	Mönchengladbach Mavericks	14	10	1	3	375	233	+142	.750	Qualification to play-offs
3	Düsseldorf Panther	14	9	0	5	351	309	+42	.643	Qualification to play-offs
4	Berlin Adler	14	7	0	7	368	296	+72	.500	Qualification to play-offs
5	Dresden Monarchs	14	6	0	8	405	237	+168	.429	
6	New Yorker Lions	14	4	0	10	222	311	−89	.286	
7	Assindia Cardinals	14	1	1	12	162	532	−370	.107	Relegation play-offs to GFL2

Source: football-aktuell.de, GFL.info
Rules for classification: 1) Winning percentage, (Note: The official standings of the GFL actually use points (plus two for a win, one positive and one negative for a draw and minus two for a loss) instead of winning percentage, which sometimes produce different results if teams have unequal numbers of games played) 2) Head-to-head results

=== South ===
Pos	Team	Pld	W	D	L	PF	PA	PD	PCT	Qualification or relegation
1	Schwäbisch Hall Unicorns	13	13	0	0	617	256	+361	1.000	Qualification to play-offs
2	Marburg Mercenaries	13	11	0	2	392	240	+152	.846	Qualification to play-offs
3	Stuttgart Scorpions	13	7	1	5	316	335	−19	.577	Qualification to play-offs
4	Munich Cowboys	14	7	0	7	256	277	−21	.500	Qualification to play-offs
5	Wiesbaden Phantoms	13	3	1	9	241	366	−125	.269	
6	Saarland Hurricanes	13	2	0	11	194	363	−169	.154	
7	Plattling Black Hawks	11	0	0	11	157	521	−364	.000	Relegation play-offs to GFL2

Source: football-aktuell.de, GFL.info
Rules for classification: 1) Winning percentage, 2) Head-to-head results

== Playoffs ==
Quarterfinals
N1	Kiel Baltic Hurricanes	45
S4	Munich Cowboys	6
S2	Marburg Mercenaries	10
N3	Düsseldorf Panther	14
S1	Schwäbisch Hall Unicorns	53
N4	Berlin Adler	27
N2	Mönchengladbach Mavericks	43
S3	Stuttgart Scorpions	17

Semifinals
N1	Kiel Baltic Hurricanes	45
N3	Düsseldorf Panther	21
S1	Schwäbisch Hall Unicorns	47
N2	Mönchengladbach Mavericks	21

German Bowl XXXIII
N1	Kiel Baltic Hurricanes	44
S1	Schwäbisch Hall Unicorns	48
