= Mönchengladbach Mavericks =

German American football team

- Founded: 1989
- Folded: 2015
- League: German Football League
- Based in: Mönchengladbach, Germany
- Stadium: Warsteiner HockeyPark
- Colors: Black and White
- Championships: none
- Website: www.mg-mavericks.net/

The Mönchengladbach Mavericks were an American football team from Mönchengladbach, Germany.

The club won promotion to the German Football League in 2010, and qualified for the semi-finals of the play-offs the following year, its greatest success. Confronted with a debt of Euro 350,000, the club had its GFL licence withdrawn on 23 December 2011. The club's board consequently resigned and the Mavericks became defunct.

== History ==
The Mönchengladbach Mavericks were formed in 1989. The Mavericks spent the first twenty years of their history in the local league system of North Rhine-Westphalia, never rising above the third tier.

The club's fortunes changed from 2007 onwards, when it introduced a new concept and new players, playing in the tier-four Oberliga NRW. After promotion from this league in 2008, the club also won the Regionalliga West in 2009, winning all ten league games, and overcame the Hamburg Blue Devils in two promotion games.

The Mavericks entered the German Football League 2, the second tier of the league system, for 2010. Achieving another unbeaten season in this league, the team was directly promoted to the GFL for 2011, the league having expanded from 12 to 14 teams.

The team followed up its 2010 success with an excellent 2011 season, finishing second in the GFL North and qualifying for the play-offs, where they were knocked out in the semi-finals by Schwäbisch Hall Unicorns after defeating the Stuttgart Scorpions in the quarter-finals.

== Honours ==
- GFL
  - League membership : 2011
  - Play-off qualification : (1) 2011
- GFL2
  - Northern Division champions: 2010

== Recent seasons ==
Recent seasons of the club:

Year	Division	Finish	Points	Pct.	Games	W	D	L	PF	PA	Postseason
2005	Regionalliga West	4th	10–14	0.417	12	5	0	7	143	300	—
2006	Regionalliga West	6th	2–18	0.100	10	1	0	9	77	300	—
2007	Oberliga NRW	4th	11–9	0.550	10	5	1	4	205	140	—
2008	Oberliga NRW	1st	18–2	0.900	10	9	0	1	348	103	—
2009	Regionalliga West	1st	20–0	1.000	10	10	0	0	406	64	Won PR: Hamburg Blue Devils (19–3 & 21–12)
2010	GFL2 (North)	1st	28–0	1.000	14	14	0	0	594	164	—
2011	GFL (North)	2nd	21–7	0.750	14	10	1	3	375	233	Won QF: Stuttgart Scorpions (43–17) Lost SF: Schwäbisch Hall Unicorns (21–47)

- PR = Promotion round.
- RR = Relegation round.
- QF = Quarter finals.
- SF = Semi finals.
- GB = German Bowl
