= Hanau Hawks =

- Founded: 1979
- Folded: 1999
- League: American Football Bundesliga
- Based in: Hanau
- Arena: Herbert-Dröse-Stadion
- Colors: Green and Yellow
- Championships: none

The Hanau Hawks were an American football team from Hanau, Germany. The club's greatest success has been promotion to the American football Bundesliga, now the German Football League, in 1980, 1983 and 1992 where it played for 17 seasons until 1998. In this era it qualified for the play-offs on thirteen occasions, winning the southern division of the league in 1995 and 1997.

== History ==
The Hawks joined the American football Bundesliga in 1980, the second year of the league's existence and played at this level for the next three seasons. It finished runners-up in its division in 1981 and 1982 behind the Ansbach Grizzlies and qualified for the play-off semi-finals where it was knocked out by the Frankfurter Löwen in 1981 and the Cologne Crocodiles in 1982.

The team spend the 1983 season in the 2. Bundesliga but returned to the Bundesliga the following year. After a sixth place in 1984 the club returned to better form, qualifying for the play-offs each season from 1985 to 1989. In 1985 it made another semi-final appearance, this time going out to the Düsseldorf Panther, in the seasons after the club exited the play-offs in the earlier rounds. The 1990 and 1991 seasons were less successful and the Hawks were relegated once more in 1991.

The team won the central division of the 2. Bundesliga in 1992 and returned to the Bundesliga for a third and final spell from 1993 to 1998. The club qualified for the play-offs in all of the six seasons in this era, winning its division in 1995 and 1997. In 1997 it reached the semi-finals for a fourth time but lost to the Braunschweig Lions. Every other year the club exited in the quarter-finals.

After the 1998 season in which the team came third in the southern division the Hanau Hawks folded and their league place was taken up by the successor club Hanau Hornets. The Hornets spend one more season in the Bundesliga, after which they were relegated, unable to return to this level again.

== Honours ==
- Bundesliga
  - Southern Division champions: (2) 1995, 1997
  - Play-off qualification: (13) 1981–1982, 1985–1989, 1993–1998
  - League membership: (17) 1981–1982, 1984–1991, 1993–1998
- 2. Bundesliga
  - Central Division champions: (1) 1992
