= Franken Knights =

American football team from Germany

- Founded: 1983; 43 years ago
- League: German Football League 2
- Team history: Rothenburg Knights (1984–1994) Franken Knights (1995–present)
- Based in: Rothenburg (1984–1994) Würzburg (1995–1996) Rothenburg (1997–present)
- Stadium: Städtisches Stadion
- Colors: Red and Black
- President: Julia Jackson, Timo Birmann
- Championships: none
- Cheerleaders: Princess
- Website: www.franken-knights.de/

The Franken Knights are an American football team from Rothenburg ob der Tauber, Germany. Between 1995 and 1996 the club played in Würzburg for two seasons but returned to Rothenburg again the following year.

The club, originally formed as the Rothenburg Knights, has played in Germany's highest football league, the American Football Bundesliga, now the German Football League, on three occasions. In 2011, it won the southern division German Football League 2 for a fifth time and thereby earned the right to compete in the GFL once more in 2012.

== History ==
The club was formed in late 1983 as the Rothenburg Knights.

Th club entered competitive football in 1984 in the tier two 2nd American Football Bundesliga. It won its division in its second year there and earned the right to play in the Bundesliga from 1986. What followed was an unsuccessful spell of two seasons in the league, being relegated again in 1987.

It took the Knights five seasons to return to the highest German football league, which it did in 1992, courtesy to another division title. The club qualified for the play-offs in its first season back in the Bundesliga, in 1993, but was knocked out in the quarter-finals by the Berlin Adler. In 1994, it failed to make the play-offs. The following season the club changed its name to Franken Knights and moved to Würzburg for two seasons, in the hope of better future in a larger city, but it came last in its division and was relegated once more, ending its second spell in the league.

The Knights spend another four seasons in the 2nd Bundesliga before their third division title in the league, in 1999, moved them up once more. The club's most successful era was to come, with four play-off qualifications in five seasons there. While the club only missed out on the post season in 2001 in this era, it never managed to reach past the quarter-finals in its four attempts in this time, being knocked out by the Braunschweig Lions (2000 and 2004), Hamburg Blue Devils (2002) and Berlin Adler (2003). At the end of the 2004 season, despite a fourth place in its division, the club decided to withdraw from the league for financial reasons. The club returned to the second division once more.

In the second tier, the Knights generally achieved good results, winning their division in 2009 and coming second in 2007 and 2008. In 2009, their division title earned them a trip to the promotion round but it lost both games against the Munich Cowboys and consequently wasn't promoted. It was however their division title in 2011 that won them their fourth promotion, to a GFL that was expanded from 14 to 16 teams.

In 2012, the club came fifth in the southern division of the GFL and thereby failed to qualify for the play-off. It failed again in 2013, finishing seventh this time. The club failed to win a game in the GFL in 2014 and came last in the southern division, having to face the Kirchdorf Wildcats in the relegation round. The Knights won both games in this round and retained their GFL place. The team came last again in its division in 2015 but declined to participate in the relegation round against the Frankfurt Universe and accepted relegation instead.

== Honours ==
- GFL
  - League membership: (14) 1986–1987, 1993–1995, 2000–2004, 2012–2015
  - Play-off qualification: (5) 1993, 2000, 2002–2004
- GFL 2
  - Southern Division champions: 1985, 1992, 1999, 2009, 2011
- Junior Bowl
  - Runners-up: 2004, 2005

== Recent seasons ==
Recent seasons of the club:

Year	Division	Finish	Points	Pct.	Games	W	D	L	PF	PA	Postseason
2005	GFL2 (South)	4th	16–12	0.571	14	8	0	6	413	323	—
2006	GFL2 (South)	4th	16–12	0.571	14	8	0	6	351	200	—
2007	GFL2 (South)	2nd	25–3	0.893	14	12	1	1	515	177	—
2008	GFL2 (South)	2nd	24–4	0.857	14	12	0	2	560	224	—
2009	GFL2 (South)	1st	26–2	0.929	14	13	0	1	564	286	Lost PR: Munich Cowboys (24–28 & 7–19)
2010	GFL2 (South)	2nd	20–8	0.714	14	10	0	4	449	217	—
2011	GFL2 (South)	1st	26–2	0.929	14	13	0	1	557	199	—
2012	GFL (South)	5th	12–16	0.429	14	6	0	8	438	579	—
2013	GFL (South)	7th	8–20	0.286	14	4	0	10	302	488	—
2014	GFL (South)	8th	0–28	0.000	14	0	0	14	388	716	Won RR: Kirchdorf Wildcats (50–22 & 42–36)
2015	GFL (South)	8th	2–26	0.071	14	1	0	13	126	618	—
2016	GFL2 (South)	7th	6–22	0.214	14	3	0	11	296	455	—
2017	Regionalliga Süd	7th	2–22	0.083	12	1	0	11	277	458	—
2018	Bayernliga Nord	3rd	12–8	0.600	10	6	0	4	270	144	—
2019	Bayernliga Nord	2nd	18–2	0.900	10	9	0	1	272	95	Won SF: Erding Bulls (16–13); Lost LF: Regensburg Phoenix (26–51)
2021	Bayernliga Nord	1st	12–0	1.000	6	6	0	0	156	77	Won SF: Passau Pirates (30–28); Lost LF: Amberg Mad Bulldogs (13–14)
2022	Bayernliga Nord	1st	14–2	0.875	8	7	0	1	300	113	Won SF: Passau Pirates (–); Won LF: Neu-Ulm Spartans (21–14)

- SF = Semi finals
- LF = League Final
- RR = Relegation round
- PR = Promotion round
