= Weinheim Longhorns =

Sports team in Germany

- Founded: 1990
- League: Regionalliga Südwest
- Based in: Weinheim, Germany
- Arena: Sepp-Herberger-Stadion
- Colors: Navy Blue and White
- President: Volker Jacob
- Head coach: Laszlo Haaf
- Manager: Oliver König
- Championships: none
- Cheerleaders: Royals Cheerleader Weinheim
- Website: www.weinheim-football.de

The Weinheim Longhorns are an American football team from Weinheim, Germany. The club's greatest success was promotion to the German Football League in 2006, where it spent four seasons. During this time, the club reached the playoffs on three occasions. It is also notable as the team where Markus Kuhn played before going to college in the US and later being drafted in the seventh round by the New York Giants. Kuhn later became the first German-born player to score an NFL touchdown.

== History ==
The club was formed in 1990 as the football department of TSG Weinheim.

The Longhorns entered league football in 1991, playing in the tier four Verbandsliga Baden-Württemberg. The club's early years were of limited success, playing in the state leagues of Baden-Württemberg as a mid-table team. Things only improved for the side in 1999 when it won the Oberliga title unbeaten and entered the tier three Regionalliga Mitte for 2000.

Weinheim played in the Regionalliga for the next four seasons, achieving good results, and finally won the league in 2004 after another unbeaten season. The club gained entry to the 2nd Bundesliga in 2005 and finished in third place in the southern division in its first year there. The following season, the Longhorns won their division and, after defeating the Munich Cowboys in both promotion round games, earned the right to play in the GFL.

In Germany's highest football league, the club finished fourth in all of its first three seasons, on the same winning percentage each year, and qualified for the playoffs on all three occasions. As the lowest-placed southern team in the playoffs, it had to encounter the best team from the north on each of those three occasions. The Braunschweig Lions, Kiel Baltic Hurricanes and Berlin Adler were too strong of opposition to overcome in the first round, but the Longhorns achieved respectable results in each encounter.

The 2010 season was far less successful, with the team failing to win a single game and finishing last in their division. It had to face the Wiesbaden Phantoms in the relegation round and lost both of these games, too, and was consequently relegated to the GFL2. The 2011 season, one level lower, proved to be not much more successful. The team lost 12 of its 14 season games, came last once more and dropped another level, now to the Regionalliga Mitte again.

After the recent decline of the football team, it was rumored that the club would merge with the Rhein-Neckar Bandits from nearby Mannheim or at least form some kind of cooperation. The Longhorns management, however, declared that while the two clubs have had talks about joint training seasons the club would retain its independence and not merge with the Bandits.

In the 2012 season in the Regionalliga, the club's troubles continued, finishing last after losing all ten season games, suffering another relegation, now to the Oberliga Baden-Würtemberg, where it finished second-last in 2013 and 2014. The team improved in 2015 and won the league, earning promotion to the Regionalliga Mitte.

== Honours ==
- GFL
  - League membership: (4) 2007–2010
  - Play-off qualification: (3) 2007–2009
- GFL2
  - Southern Division champions: 2006

== Recent seasons ==
Recent seasons of the club:

Year	Division	Finish	Points	Pct.	Games	W	D	L	PF	PA	Postseason
2005	GFL2 (South)	3rd	22–6	0.786	14	11	0	3	615	244	—
2006	GFL2 (South)	1st	24–4	0.857	14	12	0	2	511	125	Won PR: Munich Cowboys (20–0 & 27–14)
2007	GFL (South)	4th	8–16	0.333	12	4	0	8	196	311	Lost QF: Braunschweig Lions (26–55)
2008	GFL (South)	4th	8–16	0.333	12	4	0	8	248	256	Lost QF: Kiel Baltic Hurricanes (21–47)
2009	GFL (South)	4th	8–16	0.333	12	4	0	8	211	412	Lost QF: Berlin Adler (13–30)
2010	GFL (South)	6th	0–24	0.000	12	0	0	12	108	531	Lost RR: Wiesbaden Phantoms (7–45 & 26–30)
2011	GFL2 (South)	8th	3–25	0.107	14	1	1	12	240	570	—
2012	Regionalliga Mitte	8th	0–20	0.000	10	0	0	10	132	395	—
2013	Oberliga Baden-Würtemberg	6th	6–18	0.250	12	3	0	9	116	206	—
2014	Oberliga Baden-Würtemberg	6th	2–14	0.125	8	1	0	7	117	231	—
2015	Oberliga Baden-Würtemberg	1st	18–6	0.750	12	9	0	3	352	165	—
2016	Regionalliga Mitte	4th	10–10	0.500	10	5	0	5	228	287	—
2017	Regionalliga Südwest	2nd	16–4	0.800	10	7	2	1	261	125	—
2018	Regionalliga Südwest	6th	8–16	0.333	12	4	0	8	181	308	Won RR: Red Knights Tübingen (29–0 & 19–7)
2019	Regionalliga Südwest	2nd	16–8	0.667	12	7	2	3	244	297	—
2020	Regionalliga Südwest	No season played because of the COVID-19 pandemic									
2021	Regionalliga Südwest	3rd	9–3	0.750	6	4	1	1	121	104	—
2022	Regionalliga Südwest	7th	6–14	0.300	10	3	0	7	238	309	—
2023	Regionalliga Südwest	8th	0–20	0.000	10	0	0	10	78	374	—

- RR = Relegation round
- PR = Promotion round
- QF = Quarter finals
- SF = Semi finals
- GB = German Bowl
