= Rüsselsheim Razorbacks =

German American football team

- Founded: 1989
- Folded: 2010
- League: German Football League
- Team history: Rüsselsheim Razorbacks (1989–2002) Rhein Main Razorbacks (2003–2006) Rüsselsheim Razorbacks (2007–2010)
- Based in: Rüsselsheim, Germany
- Stadium: Stadion am Sommerdamm
- Colors: White and Blue
- Owner: ASC Rüsselsheim Razorbacks e.V.
- Championships: none

The Rüsselsheim Razorbacks were an American football team from Rüsselsheim, Germany.

The club's most successful era was from 1996 to 2003 when it played in the German Football League, the highest level of play in American football in Germany. It reached the play-offs in six of its eight seasons there, with the semi-finals in 2003 as its greatest achievement.

== History ==
The club entered league football in 1991 in the tier four Verbandsliga Hessen/Rheinland Pfalz which it won in its first season there. It spent the following two years in the Regionalliga, taking out a title and winning promotion in this league in 1993. The next two seasons were spent in the 2. American football Bundesliga, where it won a southern division title and promotion in 1995.

The Razorbacks played their next eight seasons in the American football Bundesliga, a league renamed to German Football League after the 1999 season. The first two of those the club finished as a lower table side, coming fifth in the southern division on both occasions. From 1998 onwards the Razorbacks were much more competitive, qualifying for the play-offs on each occasion and taking out division titles in 1999, 2002 and 2003. In the play-offs the club was less competitive, going out in the quarter-finals in its first five appearances. In 2003 the club achieved its greatest success, reaching the semi-finals but losing there to the eventual winners Hamburg Blue Devils 24–44.

Shortly before the start of the 2004 season, in May 2004, the club informed the GFL that it would hand back its licence because of the departure of a large number of players, caused in turn by the departure of American head coach Mike Wyatt who had coached the Razorbacks in the previous six seasons. The club made an unsuccessful attempt to reestablish itself, fielding a team in the lowest division, the Aufbauliga in 2006 but eventually went defunct in 2010.

== Honours ==
- GFL
  - Southern Division champions: (3) 1999, 2002, 2003
  - Play-off qualification: (6) 1998–2003
  - League membership: (8) 1996–2003
- 2. American football Bundesliga
  - Southern Division champions: 1995
