= 2010 German Football League =

- League: German Football League
- Sport: American football
- Duration: 26 April–9 October 2010
- Number of teams: 12
- Promoted to GFL: Mönchengladbach Mavericks, Düsseldorf Panther, Saarland Hurricanes, Wiesbaden Phantoms
- Relegated to GFL2: Berlin Rebels, Weinheim Longhorns

Regular season
- GFL North champions: Kiel Baltic Hurricanes
- GFL North runners-up: Berlin Adler
- GFL South champions: Marburg Mercenaries
- GFL South runners-up: Schwäbisch Hall Unicorns

German Bowl XXXIII
- Champions: Kiel Baltic Hurricanes
- Runners-up: Berlin Adler

GFL seasons
- ← 2009 2011 →

The 2010 German Football League season was the thirty second edition of the top-level American football competition in Germany and eleventh since the renaming to German Football League.

== League tables ==
The league tables of the two GFL divisions:

=== North ===
Pos	Team	Pld	W	D	L	PF	PA	PD	PCT	Qualification or relegation
1	Kiel Baltic Hurricanes	12	11	0	1	289	158	+131	.917	Qualification to play-offs
2	Berlin Adler	12	10	0	2	303	198	+105	.833	Qualification to play-offs
3	Dresden Monarchs	12	6	0	6	248	253	−5	.500	Qualification to play-offs
4	Braunschweig Lions	12	4	2	6	258	247	+11	.417	Qualification to play-offs
5	Assindia Cardinals	12	4	1	7	239	275	−36	.375	
6	Berlin Rebels	12	3	2	7	188	202	−14	.333	Relegation play-offs to GFL2

Source: football-aktuell.de, GFL.info
Rules for classification: 1) Winning percentage, (Note: The official standings of the GFL actually use points (plus two for a win, one positive and one negative for a draw and minus two for a loss) instead of winning percentage, which sometimes produce different results if teams have unequal numbers of games played) 2) Head-to-head results

=== South ===
Pos	Team	Pld	W	D	L	PF	PA	PD	PCT	Qualification or relegation
1	Marburg Mercenaries	12	10	0	2	437	216	+221	.833	Qualification to play-offs
2	Schwäbisch Hall Unicorns	12	9	0	3	444	198	+246	.750	Qualification to play-offs
3	Plattling Black Hawks	12	5	1	6	294	242	+52	.458	Qualification to play-offs
4	Stuttgart Scorpions	12	4	0	8	229	280	−51	.333	Qualification to play-offs
5	Munich Cowboys	12	3	0	9	174	411	−237	.250	
6	Weinheim Longhorns	12	0	0	12	108	531	−423	.000	Relegation play-offs to GFL2

Source: football-aktuell.de, GFL.info
Rules for classification: 1) Winning percentage, 2) Head-to-head results

== Playoffs ==
Quarterfinals
N1	Kiel Baltic Hurricanes	23
S4	Stuttgart Scorpions	21
S2	Schwäbisch Hall Unicorns	45
N3	Dresden Monarchs	56
S1	Marburg Mercenaries	31
N4	Braunschweig Lions	21
N2	Berlin Adler	17
S3	Plattling Black Hawks	3

Semifinals
N1	Kiel Baltic Hurricanes	14
N3	Dresden Monarchs	0
S1	Marburg Mercenaries	6
N2	Berlin Adler	17

German Bowl XXXIII
N1	Kiel Baltic Hurricanes	17
S1	Berlin Adler	10
