= 2009 German Football League =

- League: German Football League
- Sport: American football
- Number of teams: 11

Regular season
- GFL North champions: Berlin Adler
- GFL North runners-up: Kiel Baltic Hurricanes
- GFL South champions: Schwäbisch Hall Unicorns
- GFL South runners-up: Marburg Mercenaries

German Bowl XXXII
- Champions: Berlin Adler
- Runners-up: Kiel Baltic Hurricanes

GFL seasons
- ← 2008 2010 →

The 2009 German Football League season was the thirty first edition of the top-level American football competition in Germany and the eleventh since the renaming to German Football League.

== League tables ==
The league tables of the two GFL divisions:

=== North ===
Pos	Team	Pld	W	D	L	PF	PA	PD	PCT	Qualification or relegation
1	Berlin Adler	10	9	0	1	252	91	+161	.900	Qualification to play-offs
2	Kiel Baltic Hurricanes	10	9	0	1	231	178	+53	.900	Qualification to play-offs
3	Dresden Monarchs	10	5	0	5	258	250	+8	.500	Qualification to play-offs
4	Assindia Cardinals	10	4	0	6	279	268	+11	.400	Qualification to play-offs
5	Braunschweig Lions	10	3	0	7	168	212	−44	.300	

Source: football-aktuell.de, GFL.info
Rules for classification: 1) Winning percentage, (Note: The official standings of the GFL actually use points (plus two for a win, one positive and one negative for a draw and minus two for a loss) instead of winning percentage, which sometimes produce different results if teams have unequal numbers of games played) 2) Head-to-head results

=== South ===
Pos	Team	Pld	W	D	L	PF	PA	PD	PCT	Qualification or relegation
1	Schwäbisch Hall Unicorns	10	8	1	1	326	205	+121	.850	Qualification to play-offs
2	Marburg Mercenaries	12	7	0	5	422	328	+94	.583	Qualification to play-offs
3	Stuttgart Scorpions	12	5	1	6	331	302	+29	.458	Qualification to play-offs
4	Weinheim Longhorns	12	4	0	8	211	412	−201	.333	Qualification to play-offs
5	Plattling Black Hawks	12	3	0	9	369	491	−122	.250	
6	Munich Cowboys	12	2	0	10	151	261	−110	.167	Relegation play-offs to GFL2

Source: football-aktuell.de, GFL.info
Rules for classification: 1) Winning percentage, 2) Head-to-head results

== Playoffs ==
Quarterfinals
N1	Berlin Adler	30
S4	Weinheim Longhorns	13
S2	Marburg Mercenaries	64
N3	Dresden Monarchs	63
S1	Schwäbisch Hall Unicorns	46
N4	Assindia Cardinals	25
N2	Kiel Baltic Hurricanes	20
S3	Stuttgart Scorpions	6

Semifinals
N1	Berlin Adler	36
S2	Marburg Mercenaries	21
S1	Schwäbisch Hall Unicorns	21
N2	Kiel Baltic Hurricanes	22

German Bowl XXXII
N1	Berlin Adler	28
N2	Kiel Baltic Hurricanes	21
