= Red Barons Cologne =

American football team from Germany

- Founded: 1982
- League: American Football Bundesliga (1983–1991)
- Team history: Folded 1991
- Based in: Cologne, Germany
- Championships: German Bowl: 1988

The Red Barons Cologne were an American football team from Cologne, Germany.

The club's greatest success came in 1988, when it won its sole German Bowl, followed by a losing appearance in the game in 1989. In 1991, the club disappeared from the German football scene, having been dissolved that year.

== History ==
The Red Barons Cologne made their first appearance on the German football scene in 1982, having been formed on 16 April 1981 by seven students when they joined the tier-two 2nd Bundesliga. The following year, the club entered the elite league of German football, the American Football Bundesliga, a league in which local rival Cologne Crocodiles was already playing.

The Red Barons' first season in the league was quite successful, finishing third and reaching the play-off semi-finals, where the team was knocked out by the Düsseldorf Panther. However, 1984 and 1985 were less impressive, with the side finishing in the lower half of the table and missing out on the post season.

From 1986 onwards, the Red Barons improved again and would make the play-offs in every season. That year, the Panther were once more the side to knock the team out in the semi-finals, while the following season saw an early loss in the round of 16 to the Dortmund Giants.

The 1988 season became the club's best. A second-place finish in the league was followed by a strong play-off performance, crowned by a 25-20 German Bowl victory against the Panther, a team that had defeated the Red Barons twice in the regular season. The 1989 season initially proved even better, with the team winning its division, on equal points with the second placed Panther. The two rivals then met once more in the semi-finals, and the Red Barons pulled off a 21–20 win to reach the German Bowl for a second time, but lost to the Berlin Adler in that game.

In the 1990 season, the club finished runners-up to the Panther again in their division but lost in the quarter-finals to eventual champions Berlin Adler, who went on to beat the other Cologne team, the Crocodiles, in the final.

The 1991 season was to be the club's last. In a now unified and stronger northern division, the Red Barons came third once more, qualifying for the play-offs for a last time. In the quarter-finals, the Munich Cowboys proved the stronger side and this 17–21 loss was the club's last recorded game. The Red Barons Cologne did not compete at league level again after this, having been dissolved at the end of the season.

Some of the team's players joined the Cologne Bears, which itself went defunct in 1994, while others helped found the Cologne Falcons in 1994.

== Former players ==
Former German international Roland Wolff played for the Red Barons from 1986 to 1991, joined the Bears in 1992, and the Crocodiles in 1994. He also played for the Düsseldorf Panther before finishing his player career with the Falcons in 2007.

== Honours ==
- German Bowl
  - Champions: 1988
  - Runners-up: 1989
- American Football Bundesliga
  - Northern Division champions: 1989
  - Play-off qualification: (7) 1983, 1986–1991
  - League membership: (9) 1983–1991

== German Bowl appearances ==
The club's appearances in the German Bowl:

**Bowl**	**Date**	**Champions**	**Runners-Up**	**Score**	**Location**	**Attendance**
X	October 15, 1988	**Red Barons Cologne**	Düsseldorf Panther	25-20	Berlin	11,000
XI	October 21, 1989	**Berlin Adler**	Red Barons Cologne	30-23	Nuremberg	10,500

- Champions in **bold**.
