= Bremerhaven Seahawks =

- Founded: 1979
- League: American Football Bundesliga (1979, 1981–1983, 1986)
- Based in: Bremerhaven, Germany
- Stadium: Nordsee-Stadion
- Colors: Green and White
- President: Michael Steinke
- Head coach: JJ Fayed
- Championships: none
- Website: www.bremerhaven-seahawks.de

The Bremerhaven Seahawks are an American football club from Bremerhaven, Germany.

The club is one of the six founding members of the American Football Bundesliga, alongside the Düsseldorf Panther, Frankfurter Löwen, Ansbach Grizzlies, Munich Cowboys and Berlin Bears, but has not played at this level since 1986.

== History ==
The club was formed in February 1979 and is, behind the Düsseldorf Panther, the second-oldest still existing American football club in Germany.

In 1979, the American Football Bundesliga, later to be renamed the German Football League, was formed, consisting of six clubs, among them the Bremerhaven Seahawks.

The team did not take part in the second season of the league, instead taking part in the formation of a rival league with a number of other clubs. The Seahawks won the regular season of this league, the Nordwestdeutsche Football-Liga (NFL), but lost the final to the Düsseldorf Panther. The club's success in this era is mostly attributed to the high content of US American players.

For the 1981 season, the team returned to the Bundesliga, where it finished third but outside of the play-offs. Finishing in the same position the following year, the club qualified for the post season in a now extended format, but lost in the quarter-finals to the Hanau Hawks.

The era of the Seahawks at elite level now quickly drew to an end. In 1983, the team finished seventh but was excluded from league football after that because its large foreign player contingent violated new regulations that limited the number of non-German players per team. It returned to the league once more for the 1986 season, having spent 1985 at the tier below, but was now outclassed, only drawing one game and losing all of the remaining nine.

For the next five seasons, the club played at the second tier of American football in Germany, the 2nd Bundesliga. In its first season there, it won the northern division without defeat, but missed out on promotion to the Ratingen Raiders. In 1987, the team joined local club OSC Bremerhaven to be able to use their Nordsee-Stadion for home games and remains a part of this club. After this, the Seahawks slipped to the lower half of the table and, in 1992, the club, despite having qualified, did not field in the league and thereby ended its era as a second tier outfit, too.

The Seahawks history became somewhat erratic in the following years, competing in the fourth division in 1993, not competing at all in 1994 and 1995 and making a return in 1996 in the lowest possible league, the tier-seven Aufbauliga. The club worked its way back up as far as the tier-three Regionalliga Nord, which it played in from 2004 to 2006, but has since dropped a level, playing in the Oberliga Nord in 2010. When this league was split the club became part of the Oberliga Niedersachsen/Bremen West.

== Honours ==
- American Football Bundesliga
  - Play-off qualification: 1982
  - League membership: (5) 1979, 1981–1983, 1986
- 2nd American Football Bundesliga
  - Northern Division champions: 1987
