= Plattling Black Hawks =

- Founded: 1986
- League: Bayernliga
- Based in: Plattling, Germany
- Arena: Deggendorf Black Hawks (1986–2004) Plattling Black Hawks (2004–present)
- Stadium: Karl Weinberger Stadion
- Colors: Beige and Black
- Manager: Philipp Ullmann
- Championships: none
- Cheerleaders: Black Merlins
- Website: www.black-hawks-football.de/

The Plattling Black Hawks are an American football team from Plattling, Germany. The club was, until 2004, known as the Deggendorf Black Hawks.

The club's greatest success was earning a promotion to the German Football League in 2008 and qualifying for playoffs for the first time in 2010.

== History ==
The Black Hawks entered league football in 1987, when they joined the southern division of the Regionalliga Bayern. The following 19 seasons, the club remained in local Bavarian and Southern German leagues, becoming a fixture in the tier-three Regionalliga Süd from 2001 onwards.

In 2004, the Deggendorf Black Hawks moved nine kilometres southwest, becoming the Plattling Black Hawks instead.

Under the new name, the club quickly experienced unprecedented success, winning its league and defeating the Obertshausen Blizzards to earn a promotion to the southern division of the 2nd Bundesliga. Plattling spent the next three seasons at this level, successfully competing with the top teams and eventually winning the league in 2008. The team defeated the Darmstadt Diamonds in the following two promotion games and earned a spot in the German Football League (GFL) for 2009.

In the GFL in 2009, the Black Hawks managed to finish in fifth place, one above the relegation rank and Bavarian rival, the Munich Cowboys. The following season saw the team come third despite a losing record and qualifying for the play-offs. In the quarter-finals, the Berlin Adler were, however, too strong and the club was knocked out courtesy to a 3–17 defeat.

Plattling was unable to fulfil all its fixtures in the 2011 season, suffering from a large number of injuries, losing all games except for the last three, which it cancelled. The club decided on 1 September 2011 not to apply for a GFL2 licence for the following season but instead to compete in the third tier Regionalliga.

In the Regionalliga the club's troubles continued in 2012, finishing last and losing all ten season games, dropping down another level, now to the Bayernliga. The 2013 season saw the club recover and win seven out of eight regular season games but then lose 2–0 to Königsbrunn Ants in the Bayernliga play-offs. In the 2014 season the club did not win a game in its Bayernliga division and finished last. It came last once more in 2015 but this time recorded one win and seven losses.

== Honours ==
- GFL
  - Play-off qualification : 2010
  - League membership : (3) 2009–2011
- GFL 2
  - Southern Division champions: 2008

== Recent seasons ==
Recent seasons of the club:

Year	Division	Finish	Points	Pct.	Games	W	D	L	PF	PA	Postseason
2005	Regionalliga Süd	1st	24–0	1.000	12	12	0	0	527	117	Won PR: Obertshausen Blizzards (26–14 & 40–14)
2006	GFL 2 (South)	3rd	18–10	0.643	14	9	0	5	363	296	—
2007	GFL 2 (South)	3rd	16–12	0.571	14	8	0	6	412	317	—
2008	GFL 2 (South)	1st	25–3	0.893	14	12	1	1	556	180	Won PR: Darmstadt Diamonds (43–33 & 44–36)
2009	GFL (South)	5th	6–18	0.250	12	3	0	9	369	491	—
2010	GFL (South)	3rd	11–13	0.458	12	5	1	6	294	242	Lost QF: Berlin Adler (3–17)
2011	GFL (South)	7th	0–22	0.000	11	0	0	11	157	521	—
2012	Regionalliga Süd	6th	0–20	0.000	10	0	0	10	75	398	—
2013	Bayernliga (Central)	1st	14–2	0.875	8	7	0	1	208	118	Lost SF: Königsbrunn Ants (0–2)
2014	Bayernliga (South)	6th	0–20	0.000	10	0	0	10	80	374	—
2015	Bayernliga (South)	5th	2–14	0.125	8	1	0	7	100	315	—

- RR = Relegation round
- PR = Promotion round
- QF = Quarter finals
- SF = Semi finals
- GB = German Bowl
- Final three games of the 2011 season not played.
