= German Football League =

German league of American football

- Current season, competition or edition: 2026 German Football League
- Formerly: American-Football-Bundesliga (1979–1999)
- Sport: American football
- Founded: 1979; 47 years ago
- Administrator: AFVD
- No. of teams: 14
- Country: Germany
- Most recent champion: Dresden Monarchs 2nd title (2026)
- Most titles: Braunschweig Lions (12 titles)
- Level on pyramid: Level 1
- Related competitions: German Bowl; German Football League 2
- Website: GFL.info

The German Football League (GFL) is a professional American football league in Germany. The league was formed in 1979. In 1999, the league changed to its current name from American-Football-Bundesliga. Rules are based on American NCAA rules.

In terms of attendance figures, cumulative salaries paid by teams, performance in international exhibition games and competitions and ability to draw foreign talent, the GFL is generally considered the most competitive national league in Europe.

== League structure ==
German federal states with GFL teams in 2025 GFL north GFL south GFL2 north GFL2 south

=== Regular season ===
The GFL is divided into the north and south conferences, each with eight teams. In each conference, every team plays against every other team of its own conference, both at home and away. Until 2011, each team also played home and away interconference games against the team from the opposing conference that finished the previous season on the same rank. However, this was abandoned with the league expansion to 16 teams.

=== Playoffs ===
After the end of the regular season, four teams from both conferences enter the playoffs, to determine the German championship. The winner of a conference plays against the 4th place team of the other group, second against third of the other conference. Better placed teams enjoy home field advantage in the playoffs (regardless of record) – the seeding ensures that two teams that finished on the same rank in their division can only meet in the (neutral site) final. The final is called the German Bowl. The lowest ranked team of each conference plays a home and away series against the winner of the second division, and may be relegated if they lose. In case one or several teams withdraw from the GFL, relegation is forgone, more teams are promoted or other measures are taken to "fill up" the divisions to nominal strength if possible.

=== League expansion ===
The league had been expanded from 12 to 14 teams for the 2011 season. It further increased the number of teams to 16 in 2012.

=== Promotion and relegation ===
Below the GFL sits the GFL2, formerly the 2nd Bundesliga, which was formed in 1982. It is also divided into a northern and southern division, with eight teams in each. For the 2011 season, both the northern and the southern champions are promoted, while the runners-up of the two divisions will play the last placed team in the GFL division above for another spot in the league in 2012. There are various regional leagues below the GFL2 with eight tiers in total in some areas. A newly founded team must start out at the bottom of the league pyramid, just as in soccer, even though there have been rare exceptions, including the Hamburg Blue Devils.

For most of its history, the GFL has been divided into a northern and southern division. Only in 1979 was it played in single division format, while, from 1986 to 1990, it was divided into four regional divisions.

As of 2010, the Munich Cowboys have played more GFL games than any other team, 335, followed by the Berlin Adler with 312, the only other team with more than 300 league games. The Cowboys have played 29 out of a possible 32 seasons at the highest level of the game in Germany, more than any other club.

== History ==
=== Early years (1977–1982) ===
The history of American football in Germany, outside the US Army bases in the country, began in 1977, when the Frankfurter Löwen were formed as the first club to play the game in Germany. At first, this team was only able to play US Army teams, lacking German opposition. The formation of the league dates back to a West German TV interview with Alexander Sperber, son of a U.S. Army soldier and German mother, which created enough interest to form a number of teams and the league, referred to as German-American Football League. In March 1979, the AFBD, the American Football Federation of Germany (German: American-Football-Bund Deutschland), was formed, the first of its kind in Europe. This organisation, in 1982, was replaced by the AFVD, the American Football Association of Germany (German: American-Football-Verband Deutschland).

In 1979, the American-Football-Bundesliga, later to be renamed the German Football League, was formed, consisting of six clubs, the Frankfurter Löwen, Ansbach Grizzlies, Düsseldorf Panther, Munich Cowboys, Berliner Bären, and Bremerhaven Seahawks. Of those six, the top two teams would contest the first ever German Bowl on 10 November 1979. The first-ever league game was held on 4 August 1979, played between the Frankfurter Löwen and the Düsseldorf Panther, and ended in a victory for Frankfurt.

The league saw a split in its second and third season, with Düsseldorf and Bremerhaven leaving the competition to take part in a separate, short-lived competition, the Nordwestdeutsche Football Liga – NFL. By 1981, the Bundesliga was expanded to two regional divisions of seven clubs each. The early years of the league were dominated by two teams, Frankfurt and Ansbach, who met each other in the first three editions of the German Bowl. Of those, Frankfurt won the first two, remaining unbeaten in 1979, and Ansbach the last. The era of the Frankfurter Löwen was hereby ended and the club went defunct in the mid-1980s, while the Ansbach Grizzlies continued to be an outstanding team, playing in all of the first eight German Bowls. Unlike the first season, play-off semi finals were played in 1980 and 1981 to determine the two German Bowl contestants. From 1982, the play-offs were enlarged to include a quarter final round as well.

=== Ansbach vs Düsseldorf era (1982–1986) ===
The 1982 season, which saw Ansbach repeat its title, remaining unbeaten all season, this time against the Cologne Crocodiles, saw an increase of clubs to fifteen, including the two break-away clubs Düsseldorf and Bremerhaven. After that, the era of the Düsseldorf Panther versus Ansbach Grizzlies rivalry began, with the two teams meeting in the next four finals. Of those, the team from Düsseldorf won the 1983, 1984 and 1986 editions, while the Grizzlies earned their third championship in 1985. With the Panthers in 1983 and 1986 and the Grizzlies in 1985, both teams were able to win the title without a loss all season. With the 1986 final, the golden era of the Ansbach Grizzlies ended and the club disappeared out of the top level altogether by 1991.

=== League expansion (1986–1990) ===
From 1986, a wild card round was introduced in the play-offs, taking the number of teams in the play-offs to twelve. The league had now expanded to 24 teams, divided into four divisions. Two of those were in the north, one in the south and the fourth one in Central Germany.

The 1987 German Bowl saw two teams compete against each other that had thus far never reached the final, the Badener Greifs making their only appearance in the championship game to date, while the Berlin Adler won their first of, as of 2021, six national championships. Both teams went into the German Bowl without a defeat all season. In 1988, Red Barons Cologne defeated the Düsseldorf Panther in the final, while, from 1989 onwards, the Berlin Adler became the first team to win three championships in a row, all against teams from Cologne. The Adler also managed to remain unbeaten in 1989 and 1990 and only suffered one defeat in 1991, at home against the Cologne Crocodiles. After the 1990 season, the play-offs were reduced to eight teams again, dropping the wild card round, a system still in place as of 2022. The league, which had peaked at 26 clubs in four regional divisions in 1990, was reduced to the two-divisional format, with eight teams per division.

=== Düsseldorf Panther era (1991–1996) ===
The Panther earned their fourth title in 1992, defeating the Munich Cowboys, which, in the following year, won the championship themselves, against Cologne Crocodiles, who suffered their fourth defeat in their fourth German Bowl. Munich's title in an undefeated 1993 season was to be the last occasion for the next twelve years that a team from the South would reach the final, and the last time until 2011, that a team from the South would win the championship. The Bundesliga and the German Bowl were from now on dominated by the North. After the 1993 season, still contested with 16 clubs, the number of clubs was gradually reduced further. In 1994, 14 clubs in two divisions of seven competed in the league, from 1995, the division strength was reduced to six. For the next 16 seasons, six teams per division was the set number, with occasional seasons going underway in reduced strength because of late withdrawals. Also, an inter conference round was introduced in 1994, with teams from different divisions now meeting for the first time during the regular season.

In 1994 and 1995, the Düsseldorf Panther once more won the German Bowl, with the second title won against a new force in the game in Germany, the Hamburg Blue Devils. In 1996, the Blue Devils then reversed the fortunes and defeated the Panthers in the final.

=== Name change; rise of the Braunschweig Lions and rivalry with the Hamburg Blue Devils (1997–2008) ===
In 1999 the competition adopted its present name and initials. The unusual decision to operate solely under an English language name and initials in its own country was made to try to prevent confusion among native German speakers between the GFL and the country's more popular association football leagues.

The most dominant era of any team in German football begun in 1997, when the Braunschweig Lions reached and won the German Bowl for the first time. The Lions would play in every one of the next twelve German Bowls, up until 2008, and win seven of those. Their first title, in 1997, was won against the Cologne Crocodiles, who were now five for five in German Bowl defeats. The following six seasons, the final was contested by the Lions and the Blue Devils on five occasions, with the Lions winning in 1998 and 1999, while the Blue Devils won 2001, 2002, and 2003. Only in 2000 did neither of those two win the Bowl; instead, the Cologne Crocodiles finally reversed their fortunes and won a championship in their sixth attempt. In 1999, the Bundesliga was renamed to German Football League. In 2002, the league also lost its longest-serving founding member, the Munich Cowboys suffering relegation for the first time, alongside another one of the "original six", the Düsseldorf Panther, who had however missed the 1980 and 1981 seasons because of the league split.

Braunschweig lost a fifth final in a row in 2004, when the Berlin Adler won their first title in 13 years. After this, the Braunschweig Lions set a new record, winning four German Bowls straight, beating four different teams in the finals. In 2005, the Blue Devils were once more the opposition, followed by two southern teams, the Marburg Mercenaries in 2006 and the Stuttgart Scorpions in 2007, in an unbeaten season for the Lions. The seventh title for the Lions came in 2008, against the new force of the Kiel Baltic Hurricanes. However, after 2008 Braunschweig's dominance would end and the team would struggle to even post winning records, let alone come anywhere near championship contention until 2013.

=== Interlude - Kiel dominant in the North (2009–2010) ===
Kiel also played in the 2009 final, losing to the Berlin Adler, before finally being successful in 2010 and winning their first title against the same team.

=== Rise of the Schwäbisch Hall Unicorns (2011–2019) ===
In 2011, the season was expanded from 72 to 98 games because of the enlargement of the league to 14 teams. It also saw the end of an 18-year title drought for the south, when the Schwäbisch Hall Unicorns defeated Kiel 48–44 to take out the national championship for the first time. The Unicorns would miss only one out of the remaining German Bowls of the decade, when they were upset in the 2013 quarter finals by the Berlin Adler.

For the 2012 season, the Mönchengladbach Mavericks, runners-up in the northern division in 2011, were refused a license, leaving an extra spot in the league which was awarded to the Lübeck Cougars. The Schwäbisch Hall Unicorns repeated their 2011 success and once more defeated the Kiel Baltic Hurricanes in the German Bowl, becoming the first team from the south to win back-to-back championships since the 1982 Ansbach Grizzlies.

The 2013 season saw a return to northern dominance with all four southern teams knocked out in the quarter-finals and the German Bowl contested by the revived Braunschweig Lions, now as the New Yorker Lions, and the Dresden Monarchs who made their first appearance in the championship final, with the Lions winning their eighth German Bowl in a close 35–34 game with the only turnover coming with the last play when Dresden was driving down the field for a potentially game winning score.

The 2014 season began with the withdrawal of the Hamburg Blue Devils before the start of the season, leaving the northern division with only seven clubs. In the north Braunschweig won another division title with a perfect season while the Schwäbisch Hall Unicorns won the southern division for a fourth consecutive time (who then went on to beat Kiel and Dresden in the Playoffs to reach the final). The 2014 German Bowl was contested by the two division champions with Braunschweig taking out their ninth title with Schwäbisch Hall only scoring a Field Goal until the fourth quarter. The Lions won their ninth German Bowl victory with the highest-ever winning margin, defeating the Schwäbisch Hall Unicorns 47–9.

The 2015 season played out similar to the previous edition with both Schwäbisch Hall and Braunschweig winning their division before advancing to the final where Braunschweig prevailed once more, this time by a more narrow 41–31 margin.

2016 again saw Braunschweig and Hall win their divisions and meet in the German Bowl with Braunschweig achieving a "championship three-peat" beating the Unicorns 31–20 under Head Coach Troy Tomlin, one of the coaches to have won the German Bowl most often with his team.

In 2017 Hall and Braunschweig once more won their divisions and reached the German Bowl but this time the team from the South finally overcame their northern rival winning their third championship in a 14–13 nail biter that was decided by a blocked field goal attempt by Braunschweig late in the game. Despite losing the game, Braunschweig great David McCants was honored as the German Bowl MVP that year.

While Schwäbisch Hall and Braunschweig again won their divisions in 2018, the playoffs saw Braunschweig fall at home to the Frankfurt Universe in the semifinal by a score of 20–17 marking the first German Bowl contested by teams from the same division since 2013 and the first all southern German Bowl since 1981 (incidentally then also including a team representing Frankfurt, in that case the Frankfurter Löwen). In the end, the regular season division champ beat the runner up, just as had happened in 2013. Thus making German Bowl XL Hall's third triumph.

In 2019 the Lions from Braunschweig managed to avenge their semifinal defeat the year prior beating Frankfurt at home on their way from yet another division title to yet another German Bowl triumph against the Unicorns, in the process thwarting Schwäbisch Hall's attempt at their own "championship three-peat" and dealing the first defeat in the tenure of Head Coach Jordan Neumann who had taken over the job ahead of the 2017 season after the retirement of Schwäbisch Hall icon Siggi Gehrke who had coached the team for most of its existence and is mostly credited with the enduring success of the team. The final score in German Bowl XLI was Braunschweig 10, Schwäbisch Hall 7 making Braunschweig champions for the twelfth time in their history – more than any other team.

=== Pandemic and competition by the newly founded ELF (2020–present) ===
The 2020 season was delayed multiple times and ultimately cancelled due to the COVID-19 pandemic despite other European football leagues as well as other sports in Germany playing some form of 2020 season. The delays and ultimate cancellation caused some teams significant financial and organisational hardship as many costs – including salaries, transportation, and room & board expense for import players – were incurred despite no games being played. Furthermore, many players decided to – temporarily or permanently – leave their clubs (sometimes without ever actually playing for them) to play in those European leagues which did hold play. A very limited number of exhibition matches involving German teams were nonetheless held, but as they sometimes involved German teams with a much different roster than they would've had, had a "normal" 2020 season been played, it is impossible to gauge the "actual" competitive strength of any given 2020 GFL team, even if they did play.

The 2021 season was heavily influenced both by the lingering effects of COVID-19 – many teams were only allowed full contact team training much later in their preseason than usual – and the founding of the new European League of Football (ELF) which "plundered" the roster of GFL teams in Frankfurt and Stuttgart (sending the erstwhile playoff or even championship contenders to the bottom of their division) and led to the withdrawal of teams in Ingolstadt and Hildesheim after the attempts to move those teams to the new ELF fell through. The Elmshorn Fighting Pirates earned the questionable distinction of retiring from the GFL due to Covid and the competition by the ELF before ever having played a single GFL match. In the end, the GFL once more started "understrength" with a six team division in the North and an eight team division in the South rounded out by the utterly non-competitive Stuttgart Scorpions and Frankfurt Universe. As can perhaps be expected, the season was full of upsets and surprises despite top teams in Dresden, Schwäbisch Hall and Braunschweig largely keeping their roster intact. In their opening game, the Dresden Monarchs surprisingly lost to the Cologne Crocodiles despite the latter having lost a substantial number of players to the crosstown ELF Centurions. This, however, would prove the only loss of Dresden on the way to their first division title and the second German Bowl participation after 2013 as well as their first ever championship. Braunschweig meanwhile struggled and never achieved full team cohesion, in part due to relatively strict anti COVID-19 measures in the state of Lower Saxony preventing them from training together for much of the preseason and forcing them to hold their home opener in front of empty ranks. Ultimately placing fourth in the North, the Lions were eliminated in the quarter-final on the road in Schwäbisch Hall in a game in which the Unicorns defense won the ball off of Braunschweig turnovers five times. The great surprises of the season, Cologne Crocodiles and Saarland Hurricanes (the latter having been promoted ahead of the season) met in the quarter-finals in Saarland with Saarland advancing to the semifinals losing 37–0 in Dresden in Dresden's last game at Heinz Steyer Stadion until at least 2023. The German Bowl thus sees the division champions meeting once more, but for the first time since 2012 that champion in the North is not Braunschweig. German Bowl XLII was played in Frankfurt am Main at the Waldstadion and saw the first ever title of a team from the New states of Germany in GFL history as the Dresden Monarchs defeated the Schwäbisch Hall Unicorns 28–19. In German Bowl XLIII the Schwäbisch Hall Unicorns defeated the Potsdam Royals 44 to 27 to win their fifth championship.

== North–south disparity ==
Success in American football in Germany and at the German Bowl differs hugely between the clubs from the northern and the southern division, with the south, as of 2021, only winning ten German Bowls (four of them won by the Schwäbisch Hall Unicorns) and the north the remaining 32 (12 of them won by the Braunschweig Lions). Similarly, southern clubs have only made 26 appearances in the Bowl, while northern clubs have appeared 58 times. After the first three German Bowls, the final was never again contested by two southern clubs until German Bowl XL in 2018. Between the end of the golden era of the Ansbach Grizzlies in 1986 and the rise of the Schwäbisch Hall Unicorns (who first reached the German Bowl in 2011), southern clubs only made five appearances in the championship game of which only one was successful (the Munich Cowboys in 1993). From 1993 to 2006 no southern team reached the German Bowl, with twelve consecutive finals played without southern participation. On five occasions no southern team progressed beyond the quarter-finals. In 1989, 1995, 1996, 1999 and 2013 all four semi-finalists came from the northern division. 2013 was perhaps the most drastic of these instances as the defending champion Schwäbisch Hall Unicorns were upset by the fourth seed in the North Berlin Adler on Hall's own turf in the quarter-final.

The disparity is also documented by the inter conference games held from 1994 to 2011 between the northern and southern divisions. Of the 190 games played in this era, the north won 140, almost 75 percent, the south only 48 while two were drawn:

| Season | Teams | Games | Won | Drew | Lost |
| 1994 | North – South | 12 | 9 | 0 | 3 |
| 1995 | North – South | 12 | 10 | 0 | 2 |
| 1996 | North – South | 9 | 7 | 0 | 2 |
| 1997 | North – South | 0 | 0 | 0 | 0 |
| 1998 | North – South | 10 | 8 | 0 | 2 |
| 1999 | North – South | 10 | 10 | 0 | 0 |
| 2000 | North – South | 9 | 6 | 0 | 3 |
| 2001 | North – South | 12 | 9 | 0 | 3 |
| 2002 | North – South | 12 | 9 | 0 | 3 |
| 2003 | North – South | 12 | 6 | 0 | 6 |
| 2004 | North – South | 10 | 8 | 0 | 2 |
| 2005 | North – South | 10 | 4 | 0 | 6 |
| 2006 | North – South | 12 | 8 | 0 | 4 |
| 2007 | North – South | 12 | 9 | 0 | 3 |
| 2008 | North – South | 12 | 9 | 1 | 2 |
| 2009 | North – South | 10 | 10 | 0 | 0 |
| 2010 | North – South | 12 | 10 | 1 | 1 |
| 2011 | North – South | 14 | 8 | 0 | 6 |
| Overall | North – South | 190 | 140 | 2 | 48 |

- Awarded games not counted.

== Restrictions on foreign players ==
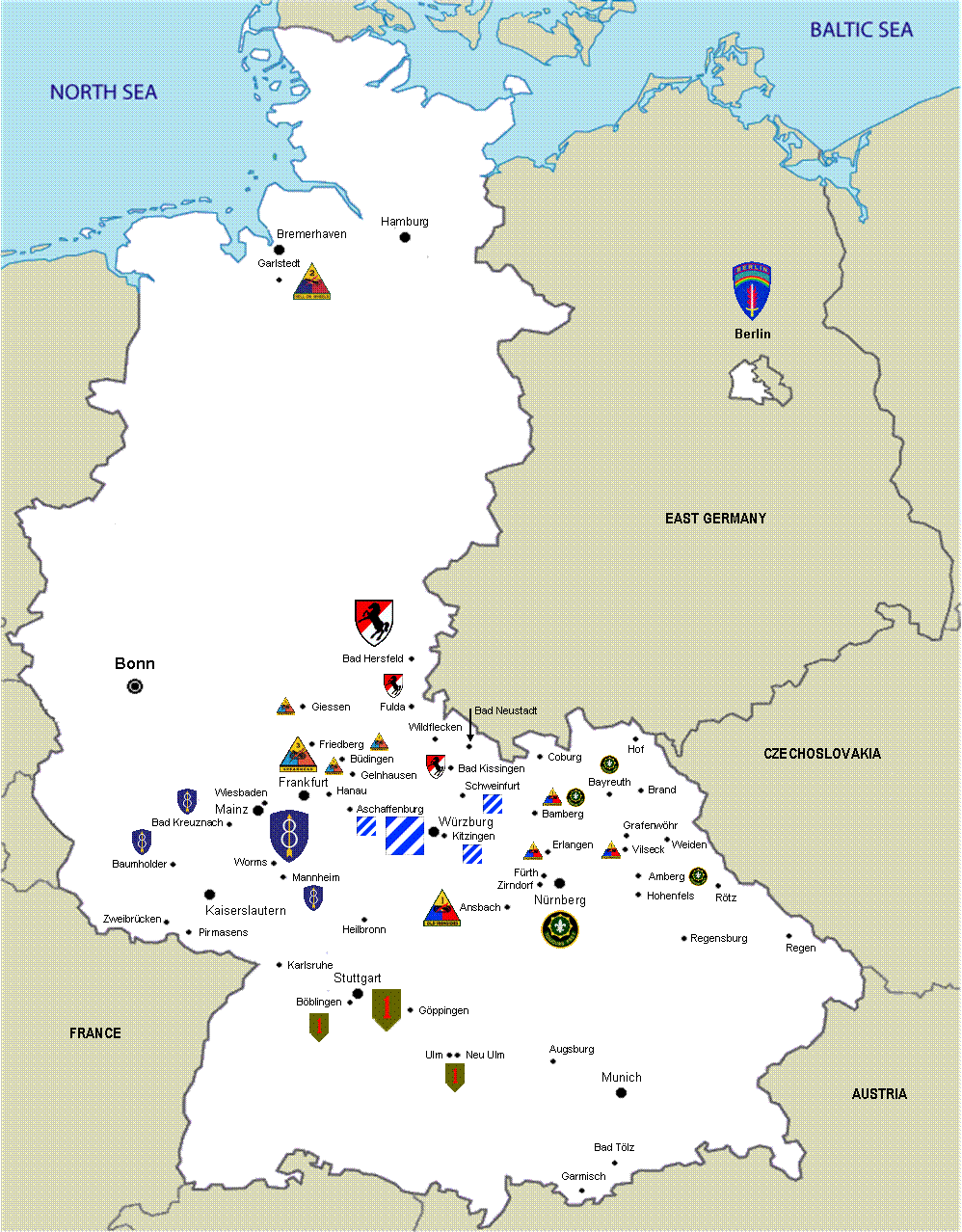
US Army installations in West Germany, 1987

As a sign of the strong influence of Americans in the game in Germany, upon formation of the Bundesliga in 1979, there was no restriction on how many foreigners a team could field. The only stipulation was, that every team had to field a minimum of three German nationals at any time. Soon, this changed, and the allowed number of foreigners on the field for a team at any given time, in this case specifically, Americans, was reduced to five. In the early years American players would simply be recruited from the (then plentiful) American military installations in Germany which in part helps explain the early dominance of Frankfurt (near Rhein-Main Air Base) and Ansbach (site of several US armed forces facilities, Katterbach).

In 1982, the number of American "imports" was reduced to four, in 1983 to three and, by 1986 only two were allowed on the field for a team at any given time.

However, with the drawdown of US forces after the fall of the Berlin Wall and the withdrawal of Russian forces from Germany in the 1990s, and the increase in talent and professionalism throughout the league, a more formalized mechanism was put in place to recruit and fly in former college football players to play in Germany for pay (salary) as well as room and board.

In November 2010, a new Bundesspielordnung, the rule book of American football in Germany, was published. One major change was that the sport now placed citizens of European Union countries on equal footing with German nationals, meaning, restrictions on the number of these players per team on the field were now not in place anymore. However, the restrictions on non-EU nationals remained in place, unless those players could prove that they had spent at least three years playing for a youth team in the sport in Germany. This was an update in part mandated by the 1995 Bosman ruling (which established a precedent for association football but applies to all professional sports) and the rules on Freedom of movement for workers in the European Union.

For the 2011 season, a club can sign up up to ten non-EU players, have six of those on the line-up for any given game but only two of those on the field at any given time. Players are marked with an "A" on their jersey and helmet to allow referees to determine at a glance whether the limit is obeyed on the field. These restrictions are specifically in place for US, Canadian, Mexican and Japanese citizens and, on request, exemptions can be made for players from countries without established structures in the sport. This rule is designed to prevent an advantage to the wealthier clubs, who could otherwise recruit a large number of players from the traditional American football countries. However, the aforementioned inevitable exception for EU citizens provides a strong incentive to sign players with dual nationality who have played college football but do not count as "Americans". In some cases the clubs have even encouraged or helped their players to get the citizenship of an EU country when they are eligible through ius sanguinis or residence. In other European leagues similar limits are implemented by other means. For example, the Austrian Football League limits the number of players who can receive financial compensation for playing while the Italian Football League limits the number of players who have played college football (regardless of citizenship). As such, the same player playing in two different leagues in the same year may be considered an "import" in one league and equivalent to a national player in another. Reilly Hennessey, who has dual Italian and US citizenship, had to wear an "A" on his jersey in the 2021 season of the Italian Football League due to having played college football at Central Washington University but was not subject to this limitation in German Bowl XLII when he played for the Schwäbisch Hall Unicorns later that same year.

== Teams ==
Location of teams in the German Football League 2026

=== GFL North ===
| Team | City | Stadium | Capacity |
| Berlin Rebels | Berlin | Mommsenstadion | 15,005 |
| Braunschweig Lions | Braunschweig | Eintracht-Stadion | 25,500 |
| Dresden Monarchs | Dresden | Heinz-Steyer-Stadion | 10,000 |
| Düsseldorf Panther | Düsseldorf | Stadion des VfL Benrath | 7,000 |
| Hildesheim Invaders | Hildesheim | Hildesheim Helios Field | ~1,750 |
| Kiel Baltic Hurricanes | Kiel | Kilia Platz | 5,500 |
| Potsdam Royals | Potsdam | Sportpark Luftschiffhafen | N/A |

=== GFL South ===
| Team | City | Stadium | Capacity |
| Allgäu Comets | Kempten | Illerstadion | 4,500 |
| Munich Cowboys | Munich | Dantestadion | 18,000 |
| Pforzheim Wilddogs | Pforzheim | Kramski Arena | |
| Ravensburg Razorbacks | Ravensburg | Lindenhofstadion | |
| Regensburg Phoenix | Regensburg | | |
| Saarland Hurricanes | Saarbrücken | Hermann-Neuberger-Stadion | 6,800 |
| Schwäbisch Hall Unicorns | Schwäbisch Hall | Optima Sportpark | 2,200 |
| Straubing Spiders | Straubing | | |

== German Bowls ==
German Bowl participants since 1979:

| App. | Team | Wins | Losses | Winning percentage | Season(s)^{†} |
| 18 | Braunschweig Lions^{‡} | 12 | 6 | .667 | **1997**, **1998**, **1999**, 2000, 2001, 2002, 2003, 2004, **2005**, **2006**, **2007**, **2008**, **2013**, **2014**, **2015**, **2016**, 2017, **2019** |
| 11 | Schwäbisch Hall Unicorns | 5 | 6 | .455 | **2011**, **2012**, 2014, 2015, 2016, **2017**, **2018**, 2019, 2021, **2022**, 2023 |
| 9 | Düsseldorf Panther | 6 | 3 | .667 | **1983**, **1984**, 1985, **1986**, 1988, **1992**, **1994**, **1995**, 1996 |
| 8 | Berlin Adler | 6 | 2 | .750 | **1987**, **1989**, **1990**, **1991**, 1994, **2004**, **2009**, 2010 |
| 8 | Hamburg Blue Devils | 4 | 4 | .500 | 1995, **1996**, 1998, 1999, **2001**, **2002**, **2003**, 2005 |
| 8 | Ansbach Grizzlies | 3 | 5 | .375 | 1979, 1980, **1981**, **1982**, 1983, 1984, **1985**, 1986 |
| 6 | Cologne Crocodiles | 1 | 5 | .167 | 1982, 1990, 1991, 1993, 1997, **2000** |
| 5 | Kiel Baltic Hurricanes | 1 | 4 | .200 | 2008, 2009, **2010**, 2011, 2012 |
| 4 | Potsdam Royals | 3 | 1 | .750 | 2022, **2023**, **2024**, **2025** |
| 4 | Dresden Monarchs | 1 | 3 | .250 | 2013, **2021**, 2024, 2025 |
| 3 | Frankfurter Löwen | 2 | 1 | .667 | **1979**, **1980**, 1981 |
| 2 | Red Barons Cologne | 1 | 1 | .500 | **1988**, 1989 |
| 2 | Munich Cowboys | 1 | 1 | .500 | 1992, **1993** |
| 1 | Badener Greifs | 0 | 1 | .000 | 1987 |
| 1 | Marburg Mercenaries | 0 | 1 | .000 | 2006 |
| 1 | Stuttgart Scorpions | 0 | 1 | .000 | 2007 |
| 1 | Frankfurt Universe | 0 | 1 | .000 | 2018 |

- ^{†} **Bold** denotes German Bowl victory.
- ^{‡} Known as the New Yorker Lions from 2011 to 2025.

No German Bowl was held in 2020 due to the COVID-19-related cancellation of the 2020 season. German Bowl XLII which had originally been scheduled for 2020 was held in 2021 instead.

== GFL season placings ==
The placings in the league since the renaming of the league to GFL before the 1999 season:

=== North ===
| GFL North | 99 | 00 | 01 | 02 | 03 | 04 | 05 | 06 | 07 | 08 | 09 | 10 | 11 | 12 | 13 | 14 | 15 | 16 | 17 | 18 | 19 | ~~20~~ | 21 | 22 | 23 | 24 | 25 | 26 |
| Dresden Monarchs | | | | | 4 | 3 | 3 | 3 | 6 | 4 | 3 | 3 | 5 | 3 | 2 | 2 | 2 | 2 | 3 | 2 | 2 | * | 1 | 5 | 2 | 2 | 2 | 1 |
| Potsdam Royals | | | | | | | | | | | | | | | | | | | | 5 | 6 | * | 2 | 1 | 1 | 1 | 1 | 2 |
| Hildesheim Invaders | | | | | | | | | | | | | | | | | | 5 | 7 | 7 | 3 | * | | | | 4 | 7 | 3 |
| Düsseldorf Panther | 5 | 3 | 3 | | | 5 | 6 | 6 | | | | | 3 | 4 | 7 | 7 | 7 | 8 | | | 8 | | | 8 | | | 6 | 4 |
| Braunschweig Lions | 1 | 2 | 2 | 1 | 1 | 1 | 1 | 1 | 1 | 2 | 5 | 4 | 6 | 6 | 1 | 1 | 1 | 1 | 1 | 1 | 1 | * | 4 | 2 | 3 | 3 | 5 | 5 |
| Kiel Baltic Hurricanes | 3 | 4 | 6 | 6 | | | | | 3 | 1 | 2 | 1 | 1 | 1 | 3 | 4 | 3 | 3 | 2 | 6 | 7 | * | 5 | 7 | 7 | 6 | 4 | 6 |
| Berlin Rebels | | | | | | | | | | | | 6 | | 5 | 5 | 6 | 5 | 4 | 4 | 3 | 4 | * | 6 | 6 | 4 | 5 | 3 | 7 |
| Paderborn Dolphins | 6 | | | | | | | | | | | | | | | | | | | | | | | | 6 | 7 | 8 | |
| Berlin Adler | | | | 4 | 3 | 2 | 4 | 5 | 2 | 3 | 1 | 2 | 4 | 2 | 4 | 5 | 6 | 7 | 8 | | | | | 4 | 5 | w | | |
| Cologne Crocodiles | 4 | 1 | 4 | 3 | 5 | | | | | | | | | | | | | | 5 | 4 | 5 | * | 3 | 3 | w | | | |
| Elmshorn Fighting Pirates | | | | | | | | | | | | | | | | | | | | | | * | | | | | | |
| Hamburg Huskies | | | | | | | | | | | | | | | | | 4 | 6 | 6 | 8 | | | | | | | | |
| Cologne Falcons | | | | | | | 5 | 4 | 5 | 6 | | | | | 8 | 3 | w | | | | | | | | | | | |
| Hamburg Blue Devils | 2 | 5 | 1 | 2 | 2 | 4 | 2 | 2 | 4 | 5 | | | | 7 | 6 | w | | | | | | | | | | | | |
| Lübeck Cougars | | | | | | | | | | | | | | 8 | | | | | | | | | | | | | | |
| Mönchengladbach Mavericks | | | | | | | | | | | | | 2 | inactive | | | | | | | | | | | | | | |
| Assindia Cardinals | | | 5 | 5 | 6 | | | | | | 4 | 5 | 7 | | | | | | | | | | | | | | | |
| Hannover Musketeers | | | | | | 6 | | | | | | | | | | | | | | | | | | | | | | |

=== South ===
| GFL South | 99 | 00 | 01 | 02 | 03 | 04 | 05 | 06 | 07 | 08 | 09 | 10 | 11 | 12 | 13 | 14 | 15 | 16 | 17 | 18 | 19 | ~~20~~ | 21 | 22 | 23 | 24 | 25 | 26 |
| Schwäbisch Hall Unicorns | | | 4 | 4 | 3 | 2 | 2 | 3 | 3 | 5 | 1 | 2 | 1 | 1 | 1 | 1 | 1 | 1 | 1 | 1 | 1 | * | 1 | 1 | 1 | 1 | 4 | 1 |
| Pforzheim Wilddogs | | | | | | | | | | | | | | | | | | | | | | | | | | | 3 | 2 |
| Ravensburg Razorbacks | | | | | | | | | | | | | | | | | | | | | | * | 5 | 7 | 8 | 2 | 1 | 3 |
| Munich Cowboys | 2 | 1 | 1 | 6 | | | 5 | 6 | | 3 | 6 | 5 | 4 | 8 | 3 | 4 | 5 | 6 | 7 | 4 | 7 | * | 3 | 2 | 5 | 5 | 2 | 4 |
| Regensburg Phoenix | | | | | | | | | | | | | | | | | | | | | | | | | | | | 5 |
| Saarland Hurricanes | | | 5 | 5 | 5 | 5 | 4 | 5 | 6 | | | | 6 | 7 | 5 | 6 | 4 | 3 | 8 | | | | 2 | 5 | 3 | 6 | 5 | 6 |
| Allgäu Comets | | | | | | | | | | | | | | | | 5 | 2 | 4 | 5 | 3 | 6 | * | 4 | 3 | 2 | 4 | 7 | 7 |
| Straubing Spiders | | | | | | | | | | | | | | | | | | | | | | | | 4 | 6 | 3 | 6 | 8 |
| Kirchdorf Wildcats | | | | | | | | | | | | | | | | | | | | 7 | 8 | | | | | 7 | w | |
| Ingolstadt Dukes | | | | | | | | | | | | | | | | | | | 4 | 6 | 5 | * | | | 4 | w | | |
| Marburg Mercenaries | | | | | 6 | 1 | 1 | 1 | 2 | 1 | 2 | 1 | 2 | 3 | 2 | 3 | 6 | 7 | 3 | 5 | 3 | * | 6 | 6 | 7 | | | |
| Frankfurt Universe | | | | | | | | | | | | | | | | | | 2 | 2 | 2 | 2 | * | 7 | 8 | | | | |
| Stuttgart Scorpions | 4 | 4 | 2 | 2 | 4 | 3 | 3 | 2 | 1 | 2 | 3 | 4 | 3 | 4 | 6 | 2 | 3 | 5 | 6 | 8 | 4 | * | 8 | | | | | |
| Rhein Neckar Bandits | | | | | | | | | | | | | | 2 | 4 | 7 | 7 | 8 | | | | | | | | | | |
| Franken Knights | | 3 | 6 | 3 | 2 | 4 | | | | | | | | 5 | 7 | 8 | 8 | | | | | | | | | | | |
| Wiesbaden Phantoms | | | | | | | | | | | | | 5 | 6 | 8 | | | | | | | | | | | | | |
| Plattling Black Hawks | | | | | | | | | | | 5 | 3 | 7 | | | | | | | | | | | | | | | |
| Weinheim Longhorns | | | | | | | | | 4 | 4 | 4 | 6 | | | | | | | | | | | | | | | | |
| Darmstadt Diamonds | | | | | | | | 4 | 5 | 6 | | | | | | | | | | | | | | | | | | |
| Rhein Main Razorbacks | 1 | 2 | 3 | 1 | 1 | w | | | | inactive | | | | | | | | | | | | | | | | | | |
| Aschaffenburg Stallions | 3 | 5 | | | | | | | | | | | | | | | | | | | | | | | | | | |
| Landsberg Express | 5 | 6 | | | | | | | | | | | | | | | | | | | | | | | | | | |
| Hanau Hornets | 6 | | | | | | | | | | | | | | | | | | | | | | | | | | | |

| GFL Champions | GFL Runners up | Divisional champion | Play-off participation |

- In 2000, the northern division consisted of only five clubs.
- In 2004 and 2005, the southern division consisted of only five clubs.

An asterisk in the column for the 2020 season indicates that the team would have qualified for a season if one had been held, but due to COVID-19 no games of the planned 2020 season were actually played.

== Divisional champions ==
This is a list of the winners of the regional divisions of the GFL. A record 15 divisional titles were won by the Braunschweig Lions, while the Schwäbisch Hall Unicorns hold record for division titles in the south, 14. The Ansbach Grizzlies still have won the secondmost titles in the south, seven, despite not having competed in the league since 1990:

| Year | North | South |
| 1979 | Frankfurter Löwen | |
| 1980 | Frankfurter Löwen | Hanau Hawks |
| 1981 | Frankfurter Löwen | Ansbach Grizzlies |
| 1982 | Cologne Crocodiles | Ansbach Grizzlies |
| 1983 | Düsseldorf Panther | Ansbach Grizzlies |
| 1984 | Düsseldorf Panther | Ansbach Grizzlies |
| 1985 | Düsseldorf Panther | Ansbach Grizzlies |

| Year | North A | North B | Central | South |
| 1986 | Düsseldorf Panther | Berlin Adler | Badener Greifs | Ansbach Grizzlies |
| 1987 | Düsseldorf Panther | Berlin Adler | Badener Greifs | Noris Rams |

| Year | North A | North B | South A | South B |
| 1988 | Düsseldorf Panther | Berlin Adler | Bad Homburg Falken | Ansbach Grizzlies |
| 1989 | Red Barons Cologne | Berlin Adler | Badener Greifs | Noris Rams |
| 1990 | Düsseldorf Panther | Berlin Adler | Badener Greifs | Munich Cowboys |

| Year | North | South |
| 1991 | Berlin Adler | Noris Rams |
| 1992 | Berlin Adler | Munich Cowboys |
| 1993 | Cologne Crocodiles | Munich Cowboys |
| 1994 | Berlin Adler | Munich Cowboys |
| 1995 | Düsseldorf Panther | Hanau Hawks |
| 1996 | Düsseldorf Panther | Noris Rams |
| 1997 | Hamburg Blue Devils | Hanau Hawks |
| 1998 | Braunschweig Lions | Stuttgart Scorpions |
| 1999 | Braunschweig Lions | Rüsselsheim Razorbacks |
| 2000 | Cologne Crocodiles | Munich Cowboys |
| 2001 | Hamburg Blue Devils | Munich Cowboys |
| 2002 | Braunschweig Lions | Rhein Main Razorbacks |
| 2003 | Braunschweig Lions | Rhein Main Razorbacks |
| 2004 | Braunschweig Lions | Marburg Mercenaries |
| 2005 | Braunschweig Lions | Marburg Mercenaries |
| 2006 | Braunschweig Lions | Marburg Mercenaries |
| 2007 | Braunschweig Lions | Stuttgart Scorpions |
| 2008 | Kiel Baltic Hurricanes | Marburg Mercenaries |
| 2009 | Berlin Adler | Schwäbisch Hall Unicorns |
| 2010 | Kiel Baltic Hurricanes | Marburg Mercenaries |
| 2011 | Kiel Baltic Hurricanes | Schwäbisch Hall Unicorns |
| 2012 | Kiel Baltic Hurricanes | Schwäbisch Hall Unicorns |
| 2013 | New Yorker Lions^{†} | Schwäbisch Hall Unicorns |
| 2014 | New Yorker Lions | Schwäbisch Hall Unicorns |
| 2015 | New Yorker Lions | Schwäbisch Hall Unicorns |
| 2016 | New Yorker Lions | Schwäbisch Hall Unicorns |
| 2017 | New Yorker Lions | Schwäbisch Hall Unicorns |
| 2018 | New Yorker Lions | Schwäbisch Hall Unicorns |
| 2019 | New Yorker Lions | Schwäbisch Hall Unicorns |
| 2020 | No season played because of the COVID-19 pandemic | |
| 2021 | Dresden Monarchs | Schwäbisch Hall Unicorns |
| 2022 | Potsdam Royals | Schwäbisch Hall Unicorns |
| 2023 | Potsdam Royals | Schwäbisch Hall Unicorns |
| 2024 | Potsdam Royals | Schwäbisch Hall Unicorns |
| 2025 | Potsdam Royals | Ravensburg Razorbacks |
| 2026 | Dresden Monarchs | Schwäbisch Hall Unicorns |

- ^{†} Between 2011 and 2025 the Braunschweig Lions were known as New Yorker Lions.

== European Football League participation ==
Since the inception of the Eurobowl in 1986, German clubs have taken part in the competition in most seasons. In most cases, the German Bowl winner of the previous season was qualified. In some seasons more than one German club took part in the competition. On ten occasions clubs from Germany have won the Eurobowl. The participations of German clubs at the European Football League, since 2014, in the BIG6 European Football League and, since 2021 the Central European Football League:

| Year | Club | Progress |
|---|---|---|
| 1986 | Ansbach Grizzlies | Lost QF: (United Kingdom) Birmingham Bulls (18–29) |
| 1987 | not held | |
| 1988 | Berlin Adler | Lost SF: (Netherlands) Amsterdam Crusaders (28–29) |
| 1989 | Red Barons Cologne | Lost SF: (Italy) Legnano Frogs (15–49) |
| 1990 | Berlin Adler | Lost SF: (United Kingdom) Manchester Spartans (33–35) |
| 1991 | Berlin Adler | Lost EB: (Netherlands) Amsterdam Crusaders (20–21) |
| 1992 | Berlin Adler | Lost QF: (Italy) Torino Giaguari (13–35) |
| 1993 | Düsseldorf Panther | Lost Qual.: (United Kingdom) London Olympians (29–32) |
| 1994 | Munich Cowboys | Lost SF: (Italy) Bergamo Lions (18–25) |
| 1995 | Düsseldorf Panther | Won EB: (United Kingdom) London Olympians (21–14) |
| 1996 | Hamburg Blue Devils | Won EB: (France) Aix-en-Provence Argonautes (21–14) |
| 1996 | Düsseldorf Panther | Lost QF: (France) Aix-en-Provence Argonautes (27–28) a.e.t. |
| 1996 | Berlin Adler | Lost QF: (Italy) Legnano Frogs (13–45) |
| 1997 | Hamburg Blue Devils | Won EB: (Italy) Phoenix Bologna (35–14) |
| 1998 | Hamburg Blue Devils | Won EB: (France) La Courneuve Flash (38–19) |
| 1998 | Braunschweig Lions | Lost SF: (Germany) Hamburg Blue Devils (14–24) |
| 1999 | Braunschweig Lions | Won EB: (Germany) Hamburg Blue Devils (27–23) |
| 1999 | Hamburg Blue Devils | Lost EB.: (Germany) Braunschweig Lions (23–27) |
| 1999 | Rüsselsheim Razorbacks | Lost Qual.: (Czech Republic) Prague Panthers (21–26) |
| 1999 | Cologne Crocodiles | Lost Qual.: (Italy) Bergamo Lions (17–41) |
| 2000 | Hamburg Blue Devils | Lost EB: (Italy) Bergamo Lions (20–42) |
| 2000 | Cologne Crocodiles | Lost SF: (Italy) Bergamo Lions (56–62) a.e.t. |
| 2000 | Braunschweig Lions | Lost QF: (Germany) Cologne Crocodiles (15–24) |
| 2001 | no participation | |
| 2002 | Braunschweig Lions | Lost EB: (Italy) Bergamo Lions (20–27) |
| 2003 | Braunschweig Lions | Won EB: (Austria) Chrysler Vikings Vienna (21–14) |
| 2004 | no participation | |
| 2005 | no participation | |
| 2006 | Braunschweig Lions | Knocked out in group stage |
| 2006 | Hamburg Blue Devils | Knocked out in group stage |
| 2007 | Marburg Mercenaries | Lost EB: (Austria) Dodge Vikings Vienna (19–70) |
| 2008 | Stuttgart Scorpions | Lost QF: (Austria) Graz Giants (9–24) |
| 2009 | Braunschweig Lions | Lost QF: (Austria) Tirol Raiders (7–35) |
| 2009 | Berlin Adler | Knocked out in group stage |
| 2010 | Berlin Adler | Won EB: (Austria) Vienna Vikings (34–31) |
| 2011 | Berlin Adler | Lost EB: (Austria) Swarco Raiders Tirol (12–27) |
| 2011 | Kiel Baltic Hurricanes | Knocked out in group stage |
| 2012 | Berlin Adler | Lost SF: (Austria) Vienna Vikings (7–34) |
| 2012 | Schwäbisch Hall Unicorns | Lost QF: (Austria) Vienna Vikings (13–25) |
| 2013 | Berlin Adler | Lost SF: (Austria) Vienna Vikings (17–41) |
| 2013 | Schwäbisch Hall Unicorns | Lost QF: (Switzerland) Calanda Broncos (28–42) |
| 2014 | Berlin Adler | Won EB: (Germany) New Yorker Lions (20–17) |
| 2014 | Kiel Baltic Hurricanes | Won EFLB: (Spain) Badalona Dracs (40–0) |
| 2014 | New Yorker Lions | Lost EB: (Germany) Berlin Adler (17–20) |
| 2014 | Dresden Monarchs | Knocked out in group stage (Big6) |
| 2014 | Cologne Falcons | Knocked out in group stage (EFL) |
| 2014 | Düsseldorf Panther | Knocked out in group stage (EFL) |
| 2015 | New Yorker Lions | Won EB: (Germany) Schwäbisch Hall Unicorns (24–14) |
| 2015 | Kiel Baltic Hurricanes | Won EFLB: (Germany) Allgäu Comets (49–28) |
| 2015 | Schwäbisch Hall Unicorns | Lost EB: (Germany) New Yorker Lions (14–24) |
| 2015 | Allgäu Comets | Lost EFLB: (Germany) Kiel Baltic Hurricanes (28–49) |
| 2015 | Berlin Adler | Knocked out in group stage (Big6) |
| 2015 | Marburg Mercenaries | Knocked out in group stage (EFL) |
| 2016 | New Yorker Lions | Won EB: (Austria) Swarco Raiders Tirol (35–21) |
| 2016 | Frankfurt Universe | Won EFLB: (Netherlands) Amsterdam Crusaders (35–21) |
| 2016 | Schwäbisch Hall Unicorns | Knocked out in group stage (Big6) |
| 2016 | Berlin Adler | Knocked out in group stage (Big6) |
| 2016 | Kiel Baltic Hurricanes | Knocked out in group stage (EFL) |
| 2016 | Hamburg Huskies | Knocked out in group stage (EFL) |
| 2017 | New Yorker Lions | Won EB: (Germany) Frankfurt Universe (55–14) |
| 2017 | Frankfurt Universe | Lost EB: (Germany) New Yorker Lions (14–55) |
| 2017 | Berlin Rebels | Knocked out in group stage (Big6) |
| 2017 | Berlin Adler | Knocked out in group stage (EFL) |
| 2018 | New Yorker Lions | Won EB: (Germany) Frankfurt Universe (20–19) |
| 2018 | Potsdam Royals | Won EFLB: (Italy) Milano Seamen (43–42) |
| 2018 | Frankfurt Universe | Lost EB: (Germany) New Yorker Lions (19–20) |
| 2019 | Potsdam Royals | Won EB: (Netherlands) Amsterdam Crusaders (62–12) |
| 2021 | Schwäbisch Hall Unicorns | Won CEFL: (Austria) Swarco Raiders Tirol (22–16) |
| 2022 | Schwäbisch Hall Unicorns | Won CEFL: (Italy) Panthers Parma (42–17) |
| 2023 | Schwäbisch Hall Unicorns | Lost SF (CEFL): (France) Black Panthers de Thonon (14–42) |
| 2024 | — | |
| 2025 | Schwäbisch Hall Unicorns | Lost QF (CEFL): (Poland) Warsaw Eagles (16–22) |
| 2026 | — | |

- Qual. = Qualifying round
- QF = Quarter finals
- SF = Semi finals
- CEFL = Central European Football League
- EFLB = European Football League Bowl
- EB = Euro Bowl
