= Ansbach Grizzlies =

- Founded: 1979
- League: Landesliga Bayern Nord
- Based in: Ansbach, Germany
- Stadium: Sportanlage Carolinum
- Colors: Blue and White
- President: Florian Menzel
- Head coach: Andreas Schneider
- Championships: German Bowl: 1981, 1982, 1985
- Website: www.ansbach-grizzlies.com/

The Ansbach Grizzlies are an American football team based in Ansbach, Germany. The club, together with the Düsseldorf Panther and the Munich Cowboys, is one of the oldest in Germany. The Grizzlies were a dominating force in the game during the first decade of American football in Germany, reaching all of the first eight German Bowls.

== History ==
The Ansbach Grizzlies date back to the 3 April 1979, when an information session on the sport was held by Erich Grau and Uli Sorge, after which fifteen players ordered their football gear and formed a team. Initially, this team was part of the multi-sports club SpVgg Ansbach.

In 1979, the Grizzlies became a founding member of the American Football Bundesliga, renamed the German Football League in 1999, together with the Frankfurter Löwen, Düsseldorf Panther, Munich Cowboys, Berlin Bears und Bremerhaven Seahawks.

The first three league seasons were dominated by Ansbach and Frankfurt, who met each other in the German Bowl on each occasion. In 1979 and 1980, Frankfurt, playing at home, proved the stronger, defeating the Grizzlies. In 1981, the year the club split from the SpVgg Ansbach and became independent as the Ansbach Grizzlies 1981 e.V., the Grizzlies finally triumphed and won their first German Bowl. For Frankfurt, it was the last-ever Bowl appearance, while Ansbach also won the one and only edition of the German Cup that year.

After defeating the Cologne Crocodiles in the 1982 edition of the German Bowl, Ansbach had to face a new opposition in the following four finals, the Düsseldorf Panther. The two teams stood for opposing styles of football, the Panthers favouring a long-ranging passing game while the Grizzlies relied on their strong defence. Of the four encounters, three went for the team from Düsseldorf, with Ansbach only able to win the 1985 final. It was not until the mid-2000s that the Braunschweig Lions surpassed the Grizzlies record of eight consecutive finals, the Lions eventually playing in twelve from 1997 to 2008. The Grizzlies participated in the first-ever edition of the European Football League in 1986, losing to the Birmingham Bulls in the quarter-finals.

With the lost 1986 Bowl, the golden area of the team came to an end. Its domination of football in Southern Germany was halted by the Badener Greifs in 1987, and the Grizzlies were knocked out in the semi-finals. The move to semi-professional players lead to the demise of the team as a powerhouse and, by 1991, it was relegated from the Bundesliga. It suffered four relegations in a row in the following years and carried out a generation change in the process. By 1995, the club managed to stabilise itself, now playing in the Bayernliga, the Bavarian league. It played a couple of successful seasons until 1999, when a substantial loss of players forced it to withdraw from competition for a year.

The team had to restart at the lowest level of football in Bavaria, but managed to work its way up again to the Bavarian league by going undefeated in the state league all season in 2001. The team continued as a dominant force in Bavaria in 2002 and narrowly missed out on another promotion to the college-player reinforced Burghausen Crusaders.

Since then, the club's fortunes have once more declined and, lacking players, has been unable to field a team for a number of years. For the 2015 season the club returned to league football, entering the tier five Landesliga Bayern Nord. It finished second in its division but lost the semi-final for the Landesliga championship to the reserve team of the Allgäu Comets.

== Honours ==
- German Bowl
  - Champions: 1981, 1982, 1985
  - Runners-up: 1979, 1980, 1983, 1984, 1986
- German Cup
  - Champions: 1981
- Junior Bowl
  - Runners-up: 1990
- EFL
  - Participations: 1986
- American Football Bundesliga
  - Southern Division champions: 1981, 1982, 1983, 1984, 1985, 1986, 1988
  - Play-off qualification: (11) 1979–1989
  - League membership: (12) 1979–1990

== German Bowl appearances ==
The club's appearances in the German Bowl:

Bowl	Date	Champions	Runners-Up	Score	Location	Attendance
I	November 10, 1979	Frankfurter Löwen	Ansbach Grizzlies	14–8	Frankfurt	5,000
II	July 30, 1980	Frankfurter Löwen	Ansbach Grizzlies	21–12	Frankfurt	7,000
III	August 5, 1981	Ansbach Grizzlies	Frankfurter Löwen	27–6	Cologne	11,000
IV	November 2, 1982	Ansbach Grizzlies	Cologne Crocodiles	12–6	Essen	10,000
V	September 25, 1983	Düsseldorf Panther	Ansbach Grizzlies	22–7	Nuremberg	7,000
VI	October 13, 1984	Düsseldorf Panther	Ansbach Grizzlies	27–13	Essen	10,000
VII	November 12, 1985	Ansbach Grizzlies	Düsseldorf Panther	14–7	Cologne	9,000
VIII	July 27, 1986	Düsseldorf Panther	Ansbach Grizzlies	27–14	Würzburg	10,000

== See also ==
- German Football League
- List of American football teams in Germany
- American Football Association of Germany
