= Badener Greifs =

- Founded: 1982
- League: Oberliga Baden-Württemberg
- Based in: Karlsruhe, Germany
- Stadium: SVK Beiertheim
- Colors: Red and Gold
- President: Miro Stychlok
- Head coach: Stefan Cyris
- Championships: none
- Website: www.greifs.de

The Badener Greifs (English: Baden Griffins) are an American football club from Karlsruhe, Germany.

The club's greatest success came in 1987, when it reached the German Bowl but lost to the Berlin Adler.

== History ==
The club was formed in 1982 by a group of motor cycle enthusiasts.

The Greifs began playing league football in 1983 and were promoted to the top-level of football in Germany in 1985, the American Football Bundesliga. The club achieved its greatest success in 1987, when it lost the German Bowl to the Berlin Adler 37–12. The club experienced a golden era from 1986 to 1991, when it reached the play-offs in every season. However, after 1991, it rapidly declined, dropping out of the league in 1993.

The Badener Greifs suffered another relegation the following year and dropped to the third tier, from where it made a brief comeback in 1999 and 2000, playing in the 2nd Bundesliga. What followed were ten seasons in the tier-three Regionalliga, from which the club made a return to the second level in 2010. In 2011, the team played in the German Football League 2 but was relegated again back to the Regionalliga. At this level in 2012 the team finished second in the Regionalliga Mitte and fourth in 2013. In 2014 it came seventh in the Regionalliga Mitte with only one win all season and was relegated to the Oberliga, where it finished last in 2015.

== Honours ==
- German Bowl
  - Runners-up: 1987
- GFL
  - Central Division champions: 1986, 1987
  - Southern Division champions: 1989, 1990
  - Play-off qualification : (6) 1986–1991
  - League membership : (8) 1986–1993
