= Frankfurter Löwen =

Sports club

- Founded: 1977
- League: American Football Bundesliga (1979–1984)
- Team history: Folded in 1985
- Based in: Frankfurt, Germany
- Colors: Red and Blue
- Championships: German Bowl: 1979, 1980

The Frankfurter Löwen (English: Frankfurt Lions) were an American football team from Frankfurt, Germany.

The Löwen were the first American football club to be formed in Germany. The club, a founding member of the American Football Bundesliga, was also the winner of the first two editions of the German Bowl. However, the club was short-lived, folding in 1985. It was the last team to represent Frankfurt at the GFL level for over three decades before Frankfurt Universe earned promotion to the top tier after the 2015 season.

== History ==
The history of American football in Germany, outside the US Army bases in the country, began in 1977, when the Frankfurter Löwen were formed as the first club to play the game in Germany. At first, this team was only able to play US Army teams, lacking German opposition. The driving force behind the formation of the club was Alexander Sperber, son of a U.S. Army soldier and a German mother.

In 1979, the American Football Bundesliga, later to be renamed the German Football League, was formed, consisting of six clubs, the Frankfurter Löwen, Ansbach Grizzlies, Düsseldorf Panther, Munich Cowboys, Berlin Bears and Bremerhaven Seahawks. The first official game of the league was played on 4 August 1979, between the Löwen and the Düsseldorf Panther, won 38 to 0 by Frankfurt.

The Löwen were an early power house of the game in Germany. The first season was completed undefeated, culminating in a German Bowl victory over the Ansbach Grizzlies, the team it would face in all three editions of the German Bowl it played in.

While the club was able to repeat its championship the following year, with the league now split into a northern and a southern division, Ansbach finally managed to triumph in 1981. Frankfurt won its division, the northern, which it played in despite being a rather central German club, but was stopped by the Grizzlies in the final. While the Grizzlies continued to play in the German Bowl until 1986, the short golden era of the Löwen had come thereby to a halt.

The team moved to the southern division for 1982 but came only third that year and was knocked out in the quarter-finals by the Düsseldorf Panther, who would go on to win the final. Panthers and Lions met again the following year in the quarter-finals, with the same result, while 1984 was to be the last season for the club. The Frankfurter Löwen only just scraped into the play-offs, finishing fourth, and again had to face the Panthers, where a 55–0 defeat would be the last competitive game ever played by the side.

After the 1984 season, the club folded in 1985, as the members could not agree how to reform the club. By that time some players had founded the Frankfurt Gamblers.

=== Gamblers & Knights ===
The Gamblers advanced in 1991 to Germany's 2nd division central conference (2. Bundesliga Mitte), which they won in 1993. They were not promoted to first league, though, due to having fielded an ineligible player. As the Frankfurt Galaxy of the WLAF had caused a Football boom in Frankfurt an Germany from 1991 to 1992, but the NFL-backed league did not play in 1993 and 1994, some entrepreneurs and clubs founded the Football League of Europe in 1994. The Gamblers gambled on that league and skipped another season in the German league. The team won 2 of 9 games in the FLE Central Conference under Head coach Tracy A. Holland, and had been spared a trip to Helsinki for the 10th game.

At the end of 1994, the club was bankrupt and formally dissolved to get rid of the debt. With Frankfurt being the banking center of Germany and maybe of continental Europe, and apparently some surplus money to spend, the players and managers gambled again. They formed the Frankfurt Knights and tried another season in the FLE, with the same result at the end of 1995.

By 1995, the Frankfurt Galaxy had returned, and the former World League was now the NFL Europe. That league was popular in Germany, were eventually 5 of 6 teams were placed, but no amateur football team established itself in Frankfurt itself.

In 2007, new NFL commissioner Roger Goodell discontinued the NFL Europe and thus the Frankfurt Galaxy. Soon, fans founded Frankfurt Universe to continue as an amateur Football club, hoping to take over name, brand etc. from the Galaxy. By 2016, they had advanced to the top German Football League, finishing second in the southern conference.

=== Unrelated hockey clubs ===
A similar-named club, the Frankfurt Lions, were actually an ice hockey club unrelated to the football Löwen. Yet, they folded in 2010 after having had their licence revoked, and the new club was named the Löwen Frankfurt.

== Honours ==
- German Bowl
  - Champions: 1979, 1980
  - Runners-up: 1981
- American Football Bundesliga
  - Regular season champions: 1979
  - Northern Division champions: 1980, 1981
  - Play-off qualification : (6) 1979–1984
  - League membership : (6) 1979–1984

== German Bowl appearances ==
The club's appearances in the German Bowl:

**Bowl**	**Date**	**Champions**	**Runners-Up**	**Score**	**Location**	**Attendance**
I	November 10, 1979	**Frankfurter Löwen**	Ansbach Grizzlies	14–8	Frankfurt	5,000
II	July 30, 1980	**Frankfurter Löwen**	Ansbach Grizzlies	21–12	Frankfurt	7,000
III	August 5, 1981	**Ansbach Grizzlies**	Frankfurter Löwen	27–6	Cologne	11,000

- Champions in **bold**.

== Seasons ==
The complete seasons played by the Frankfurter Löwen:

Year	Division	Finish	Points	Pct.	Games	W	D	L	PF	PA	Postseason
1979	AFB	1st	18–0	1.000	9	9	0	0	243	44	**Won** GB: Ansbach Grizzlies (14–8)
1980	AFB (North)	1st	?	?	?	?	?	?	?	?	**Won** GB: Ansbach Grizzlies (21–12)
1981	AFB (North)	1st	22–2	0.917	12	11	0	1	388	76	**Won** SF: Hanau Hawks (17–12) Lost GB: Ansbach Grizzlies (6–27)
1982	AFB (South)	3rd	12–12	0.500	12	6	0	6	240	231	Lost QF: Düsseldorf Panther (0–66)
1983	AFB (South)	4th	10–10	0.500	10	5	0	5	211	170	Lost QF: Düsseldorf Panther (0–30)
1984	AFB (South)	4th	14–14	0.500	14	7	0	7	276	275	Lost QF: Düsseldorf Panther (0–55)

- QF = Quarter finals.
- SF = Semi finals.
- GB = German Bowl
