= Kirchdorf Wildcats =

American football team in Kirchdorf am Inn, Germany

- Founded: 1986
- League: Regionalliga (3rd tier)
- Team history: Simbach Wildcats (1995–2003) Kirchdorf Wildcats (2004–present)
- Based in: Simbach (1986–2003) Kirchdorf (2004–present)
- Stadium: Inn-Energie-Arena
- Colors: White and Black
- President: Hans-Peter Klein
- Head coach: Dustin Daniels
- Website: kirchdorf-wildcats.de

The Kirchdorf Wildcats are an American football team in Kirchdorf am Inn, Germany. The club's greatest success came in 2017 when it won the southern division of the German Football League 2 and earned the right to play-off for promotion to the German Football League which they won against the Saarland Hurricanes.

The club was formed as the Simbach Wildcats in 1986, then based in Simbach am Inn. It was renamed in early 2004 after the club had moved to Kirchdorf.

== History ==
The club was formed in 1986 as the Simbach Wildcats in Simbach am Inn, Bavaria. After only playing friendlies in its first two seasons the club entered the Bavarian league in 1988. It won a league championship in 1992 and earned promotion to the 2. Bundesliga, a league later renamed to GFL2. In 1994 the club won the southern division of the 2. Bundesliga but lost both games against the Stuttgart Scorpions in the promotion round and had to remain in its league. By 1998 the Wildcats were suffering from a lack of players, forcing the club to voluntarily withdraw from the 2. Bundesliga to the tier four Bayernliga.

The Wildcats quickly recovered from their decline, winning the Bayernliga title in 1999 and moving up to the Regionalliga. After three seasons at this level another league championship in 2002, followed by a victory over Wiesbaden Phantoms in the promotion play-offs, took the club back to the 2. Bundesliga. The following season, 2003, the club won another title in the southern division of the 2. Bundesliga. In the promotion round to the German Football League Simbach lost on aggregate against Marburg Mercenaries, missing out on promotion to the highest level for a second time. At the end of the season the club decided to relocate to Kirchdorf. In March 2004, the club received permission to change its name to Kirchdorf Wildcats after a move from Simbach to Kirchdorf.

Five more seasons in the 2. Bundesliga followed in which the club slowly declined in performance. In 2008 the club decided to withdraw from the 2. Bundesliga for a second time, this time to the level below, the Regionalliga. Kirchdorf won the southern division of this league in 2009 and 2010 but missed out on promotion in 2009 when it lost to the Holzgerlingen Twister. The year after it was more successful and returned to the 2. Bundesliga, now renamed GFL2. After three average seasons there from 2011 to 2013 the club took out the division championship in 2014 once more. The later qualified the Wildcats for the promotion round to the GFL once more where it faced the Franken Knights for a spot in Germany's highest league but lost both games. In the 2015 season Kirchdorf finished in third place. The 2017 season was a great success for the club. They won the GFL2 South Championship and then beat the Saarland Hurricanes in relegation.

After promotion, Kirchdorf spent two seasons in the German Football League. The Wildcats finished seventh in the GFL South in 2018, then eighth in 2019, and were relegated after losing the relegation round to the Ravensburg Razorbacks. The 2020 GFL2 season was not played because of the COVID-19 pandemic, but Kirchdorf returned to GFL2 competition in 2021 and gradually improved, finishing third in 2021, second in 2022 and winning the GFL2 South again in 2023. The club returned to the GFL for the 2024 season after Ravensburg withdrew from the relegation play-off, but struggled in the top flight and finished seventh in the GFL South. In March 2025, the Wildcats informed the AFVD that they would withdraw their first men's team from the 2025 GFL season and return their licence. After a one-year break from league play, the senior team relaunched in 2026 in the Regionalliga, Germany's third tier.

== Honours ==
- GFL
  - League membership: (4) 2018–2019, 2024–2025
- GFL2
  - Southern Division champions: 1994, 2003, 2014, 2017, 2023

== Recent seasons ==
Recent seasons of the club:

Year	Division	Finish	Points	Pct.	Games	W	D	L	PF	PA	Postseason
2012	GFL2 (South)	6th	11–17	0.393	14	5	1	8	392	450	—
2013	GFL2 (South)	5th	14–14	0.500	14	7	0	7	366	293	—
2014	GFL2 (South)	1st	25–3	0.893	14	12	1	1	311	154	Lost PR: Franken Knights (22–50 & 36–42)
2015	GFL2 (South)	3rd	18–10	0.643	14	9	0	5	481	309	—
2016	GFL2 (South)	2nd	21–7	0.750	14	10	1	3	604	325	—
2017	GFL2 (South)	1st	19–5	0.792	12	9	1	2	459	325	Won PR: Saarland Hurricanes (21–28 & 43–19)
2018	GFL (South)	7th	7–21	0.250	14	3	1	10	167	372	—
2019	GFL (South)	8th	5–23	0.179	14	2	1	11	276	513	Lost RR: Ravensburg Razorbacks (28–40 & 34–58)
2020	GFL2 (South)	No season played because of the COVID-19 pandemic									
2021	GFL2 (South)	3rd	10–6	0.625	8	5	0	3	227	153	—
2022	GFL2 (South)	2nd	16–4	0.800	10	8	0	2	346	116	—
2023	GFL2 (South)	1st	18–2	0.900	10	9	–	1	366	163	promoted to GFL, Ravensburg Razorbacks withdrew
2024	GFL (South)	7th	2–22	0.083	12	1	–	11	173	365	—
2025	GFL (South)	withdrew before season start									

- PR = Promotion round.
- RR = Relegation round.
