= Straubing Spiders =

- Founded: 1984
- League: German Football League
- Based in: Straubing, Germany
- Stadium: Städtisches Stadion
- Colors: Navy and White
- Website: straubing-spiders.de

The Straubing Spiders are an American football team from Straubing, Germany. The club's greatest success came in 2021 when it won the southern division of the German Football League 2 and earned promotion to the German Football League.

== History ==
The Spiders were founded in 1984. In 1987 they finished the Regionalliga Süd a German third tier league in first place and got promoted to the 2. Bundesliga (now "GFL2"). From 1988 to 1992 the Spiders were members of 2. Bundesliga. Seven years later to the 1999 season the Spiders reentered the 2. Bundesliga for another four seasons. In 2017 they got promoted to the GFL2 for the third time. The 2021 season the Spiders finished the league in the first place playing a perfect season. In the succeeding promotion round their opponents Stuttgart Scorpions withdrew whereby the Spiders entered the German Football League – the greatest success in the team's history.

== Honours ==
- GFL
  - Play-off qualification: (2) 2022, 2024
  - League membership: (5) 2022–present
- GFL2
  - Southern Division champions: 2021

== Recent seasons ==
Recent seasons of the Spiders:

Year	League	Finish	Points	Pct.	Games	W	D	L	PF	PA	Postseason
2016	Regionalliga Süd (3rd tier)	2nd	14–6	0.700	10	7	0	3	317	263	—
2017	Regionalliga Süd (3rd tier)	1st	20–4	0.833	12	10	0	2	649	362	Won PR: Pforzheim Wilddogs (54–14; 48–0)
2018	GFL2 (South)	3rd	20–8	0.714	14	10	0	4	496	329	—
2019	GFL2 (South)	3rd	18–6	0.750	12	9	0	3	431	182	—
2020	GFL2 (South)	No season played because of the COVID-19 pandemic									
2021	GFL2 (South)	1st	16–0	1.000	8	8	0	0	334	121	Won PR: Stuttgart Scorpions – withdrawal
2022	GFL (South)	4th	12–8	0.600	10	6	0	4	339	307	Lost QF: Potsdam Royals (25–66)
2023	GFL (South)	6th	6–18	0.250	12	3	–	9	204	397	—
2024	GFL (South)	3rd	14–10	0.583	12	7	–	5	294	238	Lost QF @ Dresden Monarchs (6–35)
2025	GFL (South)	6th	6–18	0.250	12	3	–	9	268	379	—
2026	GFL (South)	8th	0–24	0.000	12	0	–	12	206	480	—

- PR = Promotion round
- QF = Quarter finals
