= Frankfurt Universe =

- Founded: 2007; 19 years ago
- League: German Football League 2
- Based in: Frankfurt
- Stadium: Frankfurter Volksbank Stadion (Capacity 12,542)
- Colors: Purple and Orange
- Owner: AFC Universe Frankfurt e.V.
- Head coach: Brian Caler
- Championships: EFL Bowl: 2016
- Cheerleaders: Frankfurt Universe Cheerleaders
- Mascot: Franky
- Website: frankfurt-universe.de

Uniforms
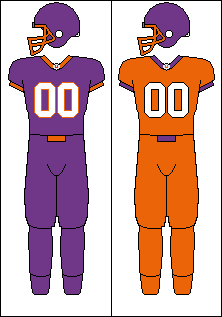

The Frankfurt Universe, which is part of AFC Universe Frankfurt, are a German American football team from Frankfurt, Hesse.

The club, formed in 2007, won promotion to the German Football League 2, the second tier of league football in Germany, in 2011. The team rebranded itself as "Frankfurt Galaxy" ahead of the 2015 season and won promotion to the first division German Football League Süd (South) at the end of this season. It was renamed again as Frankfurt Universe in 2016.

== History ==
Frankfurt Universe was formed in 2007, after the demise of the NFL Europa team Frankfurt Galaxy, by fans of the latter. Initially the club was hoping to use the Galaxy name but was prevented from this by the fact that the naming rights lay with the National Football League.

The Universe entered the tier five Landesliga Hessen in 2008, finished runners-up in the league and was promoted to the Oberliga for 2009. In the Oberliga the team remained unbeaten all season and moved up to the third tier Regionalliga Mitte, where it played in 2010 and 2011. The first season saw it finish fifth with an even record while, in the second year, it finished runners-up and won promotion.

From 2012 onwards the Universe played at national level in the southern division of the second tier German Football League 2. In its first two seasons the team finished runners-up behind the Allgäu Comets while, in 2014, it came third in the league.

In late 2014 the club announced that it had purchased the rights for the Galaxy name, would separate the first team from the club and field it under the Galaxy name and play from 2015 onwards in the Frankfurter Volksbank Stadion, home ground of association football team FSV Frankfurt. In the official 2015 table of the German Football League however the team is still listed as Frankfurt Universe. The team won the GFL2 south in 2015 with a perfect season and nearly 400 points Touchdown-point differential and earned promotion to the GFL after the eighth placed GFL team, the Franken Knights, withdrew from the promotion/relegation round.

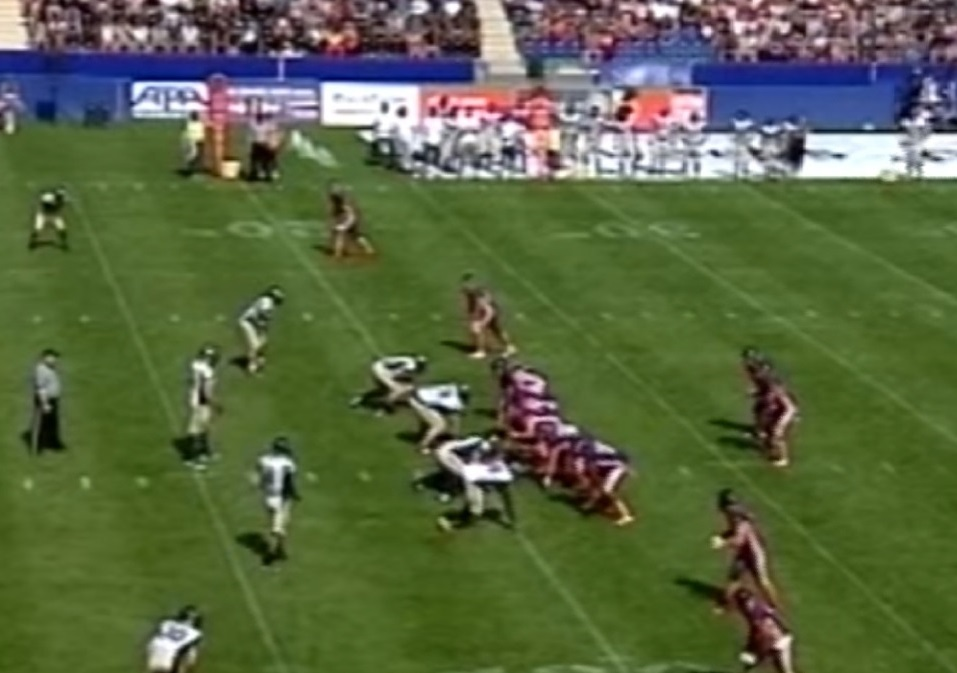
Frankfurt vs Nuremberg in 2015

In April 2016, Samsung were announced as the main sponsor of German Football League team Frankfurt Universe. Frankfurt lost the season opener to defending GFL South champion Schwäbisch Hall Unicorns in 2016.

== Honours ==
The team's honours:

- German Bowl
  - Runners-up: 2018
- Eurobowl
  - Runners-up: (2) 2017, 2018
- EFL Bowl
  - Champions: 2016
- BIG6 European Football League
  - Participations: (2) 2017, 2018
- German Football League – Southern Division
  - Runners-up: (4) 2016–2019
  - League membership: (6) 2016–2022
- German Football League 2 – Southern Division
  - Champions: 2015
  - Runners-up: 2012, 2013

== German Bowl appearances ==
The club's appearances in the German Bowl:

**Bowl**	**Date**	**Champions**	**Runners-Up**	**Score**	**Location**	**Attendance**
XL	October 13, 2018	**Schwäbisch Hall Unicorns**	Frankfurt Universe	21–19	Berlin	15,213

- Champions in **bold**.

== Eurobowl appearances ==
The club's appearances in the Eurobowl:

**Bowl**	**Date**	**Champions**	**Runners-Up**	**Score**	**Location**	**Attendance**
XXXI	June 10, 2017	**New Yorker Lions**	Frankfurt Universe	55–14	Frankfurt	7,693
XXXII	June 9, 2018	**New Yorker Lions**	Frankfurt Universe	20–19	Frankfurt	3,122

- Champions in **bold**.

== Recent seasons ==
Recent seasons of the Universe:

**Year**	**Division**	**Finish**	**Points**	**Pct.**	**Games**	**W**	**D**	**L**	**PF**	**PA**	**Postseason**
2012	GFL2 (South)	2nd	19–9	0.679	14	9	1	4	284	226	—
2013	GFL2 (South)	2nd	19–9	0.679	14	9	1	4	358	249	—
2014	GFL2 (South)	3rd	16–12	0.571	14	8	0	6	289	222	—
2015	GFL2 (South)	1st	28–0	1.000	14	14	0	0	601	204	—
2016	GFL (South)	2nd	24–4	0.857	14	12	0	2	546	173	Lost QF: Kiel Baltic Hurricanes (3–10)
2017	GFL (South)	2nd	24–4	0.857	14	12	0	2	588	125	**Won** QF: Dresden Monarchs (26–16) Lost SF: New Yorker Lions (21–23)
2018	GFL (South)	2nd	24–4	0.857	14	12	0	2	504	143	**Won** QF: Berlin Rebels (6–5) **Won** SF: New Yorker Lions (20–17) Lost GB: Schwäbisch Hall Unicorns (19–21)
2019	GFL (South)	2nd	22–6	0.786	14	11	0	3	478	252	**Won** QF: Hildesheim Invaders (28–7) Lost SF: New Yorker Lions (18–36)
2020	GFL (South)	No season played because of the COVID-19 pandemic									
2021	GFL (South)	7th	4–16	0.200	10	2	0	8	117	496	—
2022	GFL (South)	8th	0–20	0.000	10	0	0	10	124	556	Lost RR: Ingolstadt Dukes (withdrawal)
2023	GFL2 (South)	6th	8–12	0.400	10	4	–	6	227	313	—

- RR = Relegation round
- QF = Quarter finals
- SF = Semi finals
- GB = German Bowl
