= 2017 German Football League =

- League: German Football League
- Sport: American football
- Duration: 22 April–7 October 2017
- Teams: 16

Regular season

German Bowl XXXIX

GFL seasons
- ← 2016 2018 →

The 2017 German Football League season was the 39th edition of the top-level American football competition in Germany and 18th since the renaming of the American Football Bundesliga to German Football league.

The regular season started on 22 April and finished on 3 September 2017, followed by the play-offs. The season culminated in the German Bowl XXXIX, held on 7 October 2017 in Berlin.

== Modus ==
Location of teams in the German Football League 2017

During the regular season each club plays all other clubs in its division twice, home and away, resulting in each team playing 14 regular season games. There are no games between clubs from opposite divisions, interconference games having been abolished after the 2011 season when the GFL was expanded from 14 to 16 teams.

The best four teams in each division qualify for the play-offs where, in the quarter-finals, teams from opposite divisions play each other, whereby the better placed teams have home field advantage. The first placed team plays the fourth placed from the other division and the second placed the third placed team. From the semi-finals onwards teams from the same division can meet again.

The eighth placed team in each division entered a two-leg play-off with the winner of the respective division of the German Football League 2, the second tier of the league system in Germany. The winners of this contest qualified for the GFL for the following season. In case of a GFL division consisting of less than eight clubs no play-off is necessary.

== League tables ==
=== GFL ===
The league tables of the two GFL divisions:

==== North ====
In the North Braunschweig dominated their division, posting a perfect season en route to their fifth German Bowl participation in a row. However, the battle for second place (and thus home field advantage in the quarter-final) proved a close race with the Kiel Baltic Hurricanes, who had been blown away by a combined score of 100:0 in the promotion/relegation round after the 2002 season by the Dresden Monarchs, placed ahead of their Saxonian rivals for the first time since 2012. Dresden thus avoided having to face the Schwäbisch Hall Unicorns in a potential semi-final as the first placed team in the South cannot meet the third placed team in the North before the German Bowl, but this proved little consolation for Dresden who'd have to go on the road in the quarter-finals for the first time since 2012.

Pos	Team	Pld	W	D	L	PF	PA	PD	PCT	Qualification or relegation
1	New Yorker Lions	14	14	0	0	609	132	+477	1.000	Qualification to play-offs
2	Kiel Baltic Hurricanes	14	10	0	4	531	323	+208	.714	Qualification to play-offs
3	Dresden Monarchs	14	10	0	4	585	337	+248	.714	Qualification to play-offs
4	Berlin Rebels	14	8	0	6	462	313	+149	.571	Qualification to play-offs
5	Cologne Crocodiles	14	6	0	8	373	390	−17	.429	
6	Hamburg Huskies	14	4	0	10	196	543	−347	.286	
7	Hildesheim Invaders	14	3	0	11	253	475	−222	.214	
8	Berlin Adler	14	1	0	13	163	659	−496	.071	Relegation play-offs to GFL2

Source: Football-aktuell, GFL.info
Rules for classification: 1) Winning percentage, (Note: The official standings of the GFL actually use points (plus two for a win, one positive and one negative for a draw and minus two for a loss) instead of winning percentage, which sometimes produce different results if teams have unequal numbers of games played) 2) Head-to-head results

==== South ====
In the South the Schwäbisch Hall Unicorns, whose long-time Head Coach Siegfried Gehrke had announced his retirement after the end of the previous season started one of the most impressive winning streaks in German sports history under their new head coach Jordan Neuman who would post two consecutive perfect seasons and win all games in the 2019 German Football League before losing his 51st game as head coach in German Bowl XLI. The only team that came even close to threatening Unicorns dominance in the South were the Frankfurt Universe whose only losses in the regular season came at the hands of Schwäbisch Hall.

Pos	Team	Pld	W	D	L	PF	PA	PD	PCT	Qualification or relegation
1	Schwäbisch Hall Unicorns	14	14	0	0	561	250	+311	1.000	Qualification to play-offs
2	Frankfurt Universe	14	12	0	2	588	125	+463	.857	Qualification to play-offs
3	Marburg Mercenaries	14	8	0	6	344	320	+24	.571	Qualification to play-offs
4	Ingolstadt Dukes	14	7	0	7	399	406	−7	.500	Qualification to play-offs
5	Allgäu Comets	14	6	0	8	307	428	−121	.429	
6	Stuttgart Scorpions	14	4	0	10	227	403	−176	.286	
7	Munich Cowboys	14	3	0	11	278	489	−211	.214	
8	Saarland Hurricanes	14	2	0	12	186	469	−283	.143	Relegation play-offs to GFL2

Source: Football-aktuell, GFL.info
Rules for classification: 1) Winning percentage, 2) Head-to-head results

=== GFL 2 ===
The league tables of the two GFL 2 divisions:

==== North ====
Pos	Team	Pld	W	D	L	PF	PA	PD	PCT	Qualification or relegation
1	Potsdam Royals	14	14	0	0	714	172	+542	1.000	Qualification to promotion play-off
2	Düsseldorf Panther	14	12	0	2	517	187	+330	.857	
3	Rostock Griffins	14	7	0	7	382	363	+19	.500	
4	Langenfeld Longhorns	14	7	0	7	387	486	−99	.500	
5	Paderborn Dolphins	14	5	1	8	333	470	−137	.393	
6	Lübeck Cougars	14	4	1	9	275	403	−128	.321	
7	Bonn Gamecocks	14	4	0	10	263	507	−244	.286	Relegation to Regionalliga
8	Assindia Cardinals	14	2	0	12	216	499	−283	.143	Relegation to Regionalliga

Updated to match(es) played on 3 September 2017. Source: Football-aktuell, GFL.info
Rules for classification: 1) Winning percentage, 2) Head-to-head results

==== South ====
Pos	Team	Pld	W	D	L	PF	PA	PD	PCT	Qualification or relegation
1	Kirchdorf Wildcats	12	9	1	2	459	325	+134	.792	Qualification to promotion play-off
2	Ravensburg Razorbacks	12	8	1	3	422	375	+47	.708	
3	Nürnberg Rams	12	8	0	4	525	349	+176	.667	
4	Gießen Golden Dragons	12	4	2	6	337	339	−2	.417	
5	Wiesbaden Phantoms	12	4	1	7	309	390	−81	.375	
6	Albershausen Crusaders	12	3	1	8	383	505	−122	.292	
7	Fursty Razorbacks	12	3	0	9	299	451	−152	.250	Relegation to Regionalliga

Updated to match(es) played on 10 September 2017. Source: Football-aktuell, GFL.info
Rules for classification: 1) Winning percentage, 2) Head-to-head results

== Relegation and Promotion round ==
The Berlin Adler who had been living on borrowed time for quite a while now (the last time they had not had a losing record was in 2014 when they finished exactly at .500) finally failed to find that one team in their division worse than them and had to go to the relegation round. As fate would have it, the neighboring town of Potsdam would be the city their opponents represented and thus the representation of the wider Berlin/Brandenburg Metropolitan Region in the new season would be secured, but the storied Adler, founded in 1979, and six time German Bowl winners would enter a period of "wilderness years" that would even have them fall to the third-tier "Regionalliga Nordost" after another relegation in 2018. The Adler would ultimately return to the top flight only after Covid, when they won their division in 2021 with a nigh-perfect record.

Division	GFL Team	GFL2 Team	1st leg	2nd leg	Total
North	Berlin Adler	Potsdam Royals	12–55	7–42	19–97
South	Saarland Hurricanes	Kirchdorf Wildcats	28–21	19–43	47–64

== Play-offs ==
While Dresden avoided the fate of the previous three and the following two seasons of facing Schwäbisch Hall in the semi-finals and losing, they also lost home field advantage and without their loyal supporters in Heinz Steyer Stadion where they had never lost a play-off game, they would face the new southern powerhouse Frankfurt Universe on the road. Inevitably, Dresden lost, marking their first one-and-done stint in the play-offs since 2012. Meanwhile the defending champion from Braunschweig had little trouble beating Ingolstadt and Kiel used its home field advantage to advance to the next round - which would pit them against their opponents in the 2011 and 2012 finals, the Schwäbisch Hall Unicorns. Faced, like the previous year, with opposition from Berlin in the quarter-finals, the Unicorns once again had surprising difficulty winning the game, but unlike in 2013 when the Berlin Adler had upset them, the Unicorns ultimately prevailed in Overtime. The semi-finals once again saw the home teams prevail, but the Frankfurt Universe made it a quite close game for Braunschweig - the next year Frankfurt would manage to upset the Northern champion in the semi-final to reach their first ever German Bowl. Kiel meanwhile lost to Schwäbisch Hall as they had in their previous three meetings in the play-offs. In the German Bowl the matchup was thus the same as the three previous seasons, but this time the Schwäbisch Hall Unicorns finally managed to defeat the Lions to clench their third championship ring and bringing their German Bowl record to 3–3.

Quarterfinals
N1	New Yorker Lions	47
S4	Ingolstadt Dukes	6
S2	Frankfurt Universe	26
N3	Dresden Monarchs	16
S1	Schwäbisch Hall Unicorns	31*
N4	Berlin Rebels	24
N2	Kiel Baltic Hurricanes	28
S3	Marburg Mercenaries	14

Semifinals
New Yorker Lions	23
Frankfurt Universe	21
Schwäbisch Hall Unicorns	33
Kiel Baltic Hurricanes	11

German Bowl
New Yorker Lions	13
Schwäbisch Hall Unicorns	14

* Indicates overtime victory
