= Saarland Hurricanes =

- Founded: 1982
- League: German Football League
- Team history: Saarlouis Hurrikans (1982–1984) Dillingen Hurrikanes (1984–1989) Dillingen Steelhawks (1989–1996) Saarland Hurricanes (1997–present)
- Based in: Saarbrücken, Germany
- Stadium: Hermann Neuberger Stadion
- Colors: Red and Black
- President: Boris Röder
- Head coach: Jakob Lawrence
- Manager: Annika Krämer
- Championships: German Junior Bowl: 2013
- Cheerleaders: Hurriflames
- Website: saarland-hurricanes.eu

The Saarland Hurricanes are an American football team from Saarbrücken, Germany. Saarbrücken is the capital of the federal German state of Saarland, which the club is named after. The club was formed in 1996 in a merger of the two local sides Saarbrücken Wölfe and Dillingen Steelhawks.

As its greatest success, the team has won promotion to the German Football League twice, in 2000 and 2010. In this league, it qualified for the play-offs once, in 2005. On junior level the club earned its greatest success in 2013 when it won the German Junior Bowl for the first time.

== History ==
=== Predecessor clubs ===
The earliest club the current Hurricanes link their past to are the Saarlouis Hurrikans, a team from Saarlouis, which was formed in 1982. This team played in the 2nd Bundesliga from 1983 onwards, but relocated to Dillingen in 1984 and became the Dillingen Hurrikanes.

In between, in 1983, another American football club was formed, the Saarlouis Wölfe, but never reached above local league level and folded in 1989, with its players joining the Dillingen Hurrikanes. Meanwhile, the Dillingen Hurrikanes continued playing in the 2nd Bundesliga until 1986, when its division folded and the club had to step a level down. In 1989, after the Wölfe had folded, the club was renamed Dillingen Steelhawks.

Also in 1989, the Saarbrücken Ghostbusters were formed as another American football club in the Saarland.

The Dillingen Steelhawks continued competitive league football in the tier-three Regionalliga, at times alongside the Ghostbusters. The team remained at local level until 1993, when it won promotion to the central division of the 2nd Bundesliga. At this level, it lasted for only one season, but bounced back in 1995 and returned to the second level for 1996.

The Saarbrücken Ghostbusters were renamed Saarbrücken Wölfe in 1991 but were unable to rise above the third tier of the league system. By the end of 1996, both the Saarbrücken and the Dillingen club had come to the conclusion that, as individual clubs, no further improvement was possible and agreed on a merger.

=== Saarland Hurricanes ===
The team, now as the Saarland Hurricanes is in the 1st Bundesliga (German Football League - GFL). In their early days in the Bundesliga, they had some instant success, winning its division in 1997 and 2000. In 1997, the Stuttgart Scorpions proved too strong, winning both promotion/relegation matches and barring the Hurricanes from the elite league. In its second attempt, in 2000, the side overcame the Landsberg Express in the first game of the promotion round 40–22. Landsberg did not field in the second game and the Hurricanes were qualified for the German Football League for the 2001 season.

The Saarland Hurricanes were not a strong side in their following time in the GFL, only winning a game each in three of their first four seasons. However, they still managed to finish fifth and away from the relegation rank. The 2005 season was to be the club's best, finishing with a balanced win–loss record and qualifying for the post season for the first time. It then lost to the Braunschweig Lions 17–32 in the quarter-finals and was eliminated.

After this one-off success, the club quickly declined again and finished last in its division in 2007. Having to enter the relegation round, the team lost both games to the Munich Cowboys and found itself back in the 2nd Bundesliga.

In this league, soon to be renamed German Football League 2, the Saarland Hurricanes took two seasons to rebuild before another division title in 2010 meant direct promotion back to the GFL, courtesy to a league expansion. The club was only able to win two of their regular season games in 2011 and finished second-last in the GFL South, avoiding relegation because of an even worse performance by the Plattling Black Hawks.

In 2012, the club came seventh in the southern division of the GFL and thereby failed to qualify for the play-off. It improved to fifth place in 2013 but again did not qualify for the play-offs. The 2014 season saw another sixth-place finish and the club once again missed out on the play-offs. It finished fourth in the GFL south in 2015 and qualified for the play-offs for the second time in the club's history, losing to the New Yorker Lions in the quarter-finals.

== Honours ==
- German Junior Bowl
  - Champions: 2013
- GFL
  - Play-off qualification: (3) 2005, 2015, 2016
  - League membership: (20) 2001–2007, 2011–2017, 2021–present
- GFL2
  - Southern Division champions: 1997, 2000, 2010

== Recent seasons ==
Recent seasons of the club:

Year	Division	Finish	Points	Pct.	Games	W	D	L	PF	PA	Postseason
2005	GFL (South)	4th	10–10	0.500	10	5	0	5	294	298	Lost QF: Braunschweig Lions (17–32)
2006	GFL (South)	5th	6–18	0.250	12	3	0	9	154	333	—
2007	GFL (South)	6th	2–22	0.083	12	1	0	11	88	378	Lost RR: Munich Cowboys (7–25 & 2–48)
2008	GFL2 (South)	5th	12–16	0.429	14	6	0	8	271	273	—
2009	GFL2 (South)	4th	16–12	0.571	14	8	0	6	355	286	—
2010	GFL2 (South)	1st	24–4	0.857	14	12	0	2	381	197	—
2011	GFL (South)	6th	4–22	0.154	13	2	0	11	194	363	—
2012	GFL (South)	7th	7–21	0.250	14	3	1	10	366	479	—
2013	GFL (South)	5th	10–18	0.357	14	5	0	9	297	389	—
2014	GFL (South)	6th	12–16	0.429	14	6	0	8	426	432	—
2015	GFL (South)	4th	16–12	0.571	14	8	0	6	419	342	Lost QF: New Yorker Lions (14–57)
2016	GFL (South)	3rd	16–12	0.571	14	8	0	6	415	370	Lost QF: Dresden Monarchs (7–43)
2017	GFL (South)	8th	4–24	0.143	14	2	0	12	186	469	Lost RR: Kirchdorf Wildcats (28–21 & 19–43)
2018	GFL2 (South)	2nd	21–7	0.750	14	10	1	3	550	297	—
2019	GFL2 (South)	2nd	18–6	0.750	12	9	0	3	501	183	—
2020	GFL2 (South)	No season played because of the COVID-19 pandemic									
2021	GFL (South)	2nd	16–4	0.800	10	8	0	2	332	147	Won QF: Cologne Crocodiles (35–16) Lost SF: Dresden Monarchs (0–35)
2022	GFL (South)	5th	8–12	0.400	10	4	0	6	348	302	—
2023	GFL (South)	3rd	18–6	0.750	12	9	–	3	465	366	Lost QF: Dresden Monarchs (38–45)
2024	GFL (South)	6th	6–18	0.250	12	3	–	9	301	390	—
2025	GFL (South)	5th	8–16	0.333	12	4	–	8	338	398	—
2026	GFL (South)	6th	4–20	0.167	12	2	–	10	196	484	—

- RR = Relegation round
- QF = Quarter finals
- SF = Semi finals
- In the 2011 season, the game against Plattling Black Hawks was not played.
