= 2018 German Football League =

- League: German Football League
- Sport: American football
- Duration: 21 April–13 October 2018
- Number of teams: 16
- Top scorer: Mitchell Paige (156)
- Promoted to GFL: Düsseldorf Panther
- Relegated to GFL2: Hamburg Huskies

Regular season
- GFL North champions: New Yorker Lions
- GFL South champions: Schwäbisch Hall Unicorns

German Bowl XL
- Champions: Schwäbisch Hall Unicorns
- Runners-up: Frankfurt Universe

GFL seasons
- ← 2017 2019 →

The 2018 German Football League season was the 40th edition of the top-level American football competition in Germany.

The regular season started on 21 April and finished on 9 September 2018, followed by the play-offs. The season culminated in the German Bowl XL, which was held on 13 October 2018 in Berlin.

== Modus ==
Location of teams in the German Football League 2018

During the regular season each club plays all other clubs in its division twice, home and away, resulting in each team playing 14 regular season games. There are no games between clubs from opposite divisions, interconference games having been abolished after the 2011 season.

The best four teams in each division qualify for the play-offs where, in the quarter-finals, teams from opposite divisions play each other, whereby the better placed teams have home field advantage. The first placed team plays the fourth placed from the other division and the second placed the third placed team. From the semi-finals onwards teams from the same division can meet again.

The eighth placed team in each division enter a two-leg play-off with the winner of the respective division of the German Football League 2, the second tier of the league system in Germany. The winners of this contest qualify for the GFL for the following season.

== League tables ==
=== GFL ===
The league tables of the two GFL divisions:

==== North ====
The defending division champion Braunschweig had a harder time walking away with first place this time than the previous year. While the Kiel Baltic Hurricanes who had proven fierce competitors in 2017 disappeared into obscurity (from which they wouldn't emerge for some years to come), the Dresden Monarchs finished with the same record as the Lions and the game between the two in Braunschweig was a 28–28 draw (The GFL does not have regular season overtime, thus making drawn games more likely) and ultimately the head-to-head was the deciding factor giving Braunschweig first place ahead of Dresden as Dresden had lost their home game against Braunschweig 24–44, which was the only home game that year that Dresden did not win. Just half a game behind the top duo were the Berlin Rebels, who were now the sole top-flight representative of the German capital in German Football after their crosstown rivals, the Berlin Adler, were relegated the previous year. Much behind the top trio was the final Northern play-off entrant, the Cologne Crocodiles who had actually allowed more points scored by their opponents than they themselves had scored and finished barely above .500. The Hamburg Huskies were completely outmatched and lost every single game which continued into the relegation round ending their stint in the top flight that had begun in 2015.

Pos	Team	Pld	W	D	L	PF	PA	PD	PCT	Qualification or relegation
1	New Yorker Lions	14	11	1	2	526	178	+348	.821	Qualification to play-offs
2	Dresden Monarchs	14	11	1	2	507	287	+220	.821	Qualification to play-offs
3	Berlin Rebels	14	11	0	3	367	211	+156	.786	Qualification to play-offs
4	Cologne Crocodiles	14	7	1	6	376	403	−27	.536	Qualification to play-offs
5	Potsdam Royals	14	6	0	8	403	360	+43	.429	
6	Kiel Baltic Hurricanes	14	4	1	9	297	394	−97	.321	
7	Hildesheim Invaders	14	4	0	10	145	446	−301	.286	
8	Hamburg Huskies	14	0	0	14	157	499	−342	.000	Relegation play-offs to GFL2

Source: Football-aktuell, GFL.info
Rules for classification: 1) Winning percentage, (Note: The official standings of the GFL actually use points (plus two for a win, one positive and one negative for a draw and minus two for a loss) instead of winning percentage, which sometimes produce different results if teams have unequal numbers of games played) 2) Head-to-head results

==== South ====
In the South, Schwäbisch Hall continued its domination and added to the 17 wins of the previous season (14 regular season, 3 play-offs, including the German Bowl) another 14 on the way to a 50 game winning streak that wouldn't snap until German Bowl XLI. Frankfurt Universe were punished for some off-field financial improprieties by the league with having "four points" (equivalent to two victories) deducted from their total, but in the end it did not affect the standings as Frankfurt lost only to Schwäbisch Hall and won all its other games. In third place were the Allgäu Comets, the only other team with a winning record at 8–6. The tie-breaker for the fourth play-off spot in the South went to the Munich Cowboys as they had scored more points in their head-to-head games than the Marburg Mercenaries, both teams having won their home matches.

Pos	Team	Pld	W	D	L	PF	PA	PD	PCT	Qualification or relegation
1	Schwäbisch Hall Unicorns	14	14	0	0	558	163	+395	1.000	Qualification to play-offs
2	Frankfurt Universe (Note: The Frankfurt Universe were charged two wins for violating licensing regulations.)	12	10	0	2	504	143	+361	.833	Qualification to play-offs
3	Allgäu Comets	14	8	0	6	403	488	−85	.571	Qualification to play-offs
4	Munich Cowboys (Note: The Munich Cowboys scored 75–50 points against the Marburg Mercenaries, both teams won their home match.)	14	6	0	8	290	373	−83	.429	Qualification to play-offs
5	Marburg Mercenaries	14	6	0	8	366	438	−72	.429	
6	Ingolstadt Dukes	14	4	1	9	350	401	−51	.321	
7	Kirchdorf Wildcats	14	3	1	10	167	372	−205	.250	
8	Stuttgart Scorpions	14	2	0	12	226	486	−260	.143	Relegation play-offs to GFL2

Source: Football-aktuell, GFL.info
Rules for classification: 1) Winning percentage, 2) Head-to-head results

=== GFL2 ===
The league tables of the two GFL2 divisions:

==== North ====
Pos	Team	Pld	W	D	L	PF	PA	PD	PCT	Qualification or relegation
1	Düsseldorf Panther	14	13	0	1	383	155	+228	.929	Qualification to promotion play-off
2	Solingen Paladins	14	10	0	4	493	332	+161	.714	
3	Elmshorn Fighting Pirates	14	8	0	6	538	466	+72	.571	
4	Rostock Griffins	14	8	0	6	373	304	+69	.571	
5	Langenfeld Longhorns	14	6	0	8	305	398	−93	.429	
6	Lübeck Cougars	14	6	0	8	258	330	−72	.429	
7	Paderborn Dolphins	14	3	0	11	317	487	−170	.214	Relegation to Regionalliga
8	Berlin Adler	14	2	0	12	226	421	−195	.143	Relegation to Regionalliga

Source: Football-aktuell, GFL.info
Rules for classification: 1) Winning percentage, 2) Head-to-head results

==== South ====
Pos	Team	Pld	W	D	L	PF	PA	PD	PCT	Qualification or relegation
1	Ravensburg Razorbacks	14	11	1	2	661	414	+247	.821	Qualification to promotion play-off
2	Saarland Hurricanes	14	10	1	3	550	297	+253	.750	
3	Straubing Spiders	14	10	0	4	496	329	+167	.714	
4	Nürnberg Rams	14	8	0	6	467	509	−42	.571	
5	Wiesbaden Phantoms	14	7	0	7	342	392	−50	.500	
6	Gießen Golden Dragons	13	3	3	7	337	323	+14	.346	
7	Albershausen Crusaders	14	2	1	11	350	582	−232	.179	Relegation to Regionalliga
8	Montabaur Fighting Pirates	13	1	0	12	177	534	−357	.077	Relegation to Regionalliga

Source: Football-aktuell, GFL.info
Rules for classification: 1) Winning percentage, 2) Head-to-head results

== Relegation and Promotion round ==
Continuing their Yo-yo club tendencies, the Düsseldorf Panther returned to the top-flight after a two year absence. The following season would see them lose every single game, including both relegation matches against the Elmshorn Fighting Pirates sending them back to the second division GFL2 once more. In 2021 of course, they placed second there and are thus eligible to fill one of the two open spots for the 2022 German Football League in the North.

Division	GFL Team	GFL2 Team	1st leg	2nd leg	Total
North	Hamburg Huskies	Düsseldorf Panther	10–36	21–34	31–70
South	Stuttgart Scorpions	Ravensburg Razorbacks	72–34	48–6	120–40

== Play-offs ==
Frankfurt had surprising difficulty in the quarterfinals in overcoming the Berlin Rebels in a game where neither team scored a touchdown kicking the game winning field goal with 21 seconds remaining in the game after having given up a Safety in the fourth quarter. Frankfurt had fewer first downs, fewer passing yards, fewer rushing yards and fewer third down conversions while also possessing the ball for a shorter amount of time than Berlin, but while the Rebels had only one Field Goal to show for four Red Zone trips, Frankfurt scored a Field Goal during both their stints in the Red zone – enough to squeak by 6–5. The other quarterfinals saw the home teams win in more convincing fashion and there would thus be a repeat of the 2017 semifinal for Frankfurt while the Dresden Monarchs got another chance to snap their three game losing streak at Optima Sportpark, which had only been paused in 2017 because Dresden failed to make the semifinal altogether. Frankfurt managed to keep the game tied after four quarters and ultimately prevailed over Braunschweig in double overtime (both teams scored touchdowns with the point after Touchdown good in the first overtime period, but only Frankfurt scored in the second as Braunschweig were intercepted in their second possession) dealing the Lions their first post-season defeat since 2010. Dresden meanwhile failed to reverse their trend of semifinal defeats in Hall being shut out into the third quarter and having to give up a Safety in their 23–7 defeat to the defending champion. Thus German Bowl XL would see something not seen since 1981 – an all Southern final.

Quarterfinals
N1	New Yorker Lions	59
S4	Munich Cowboys	14
S2	Frankfurt Universe	6
N3	Berlin Rebels	5
S1	Schwäbisch Hall Unicorns	37
N4	Cologne Crocodiles	14
N2	Dresden Monarchs	51
S3	Allgäu Comets	19

Semifinals
New Yorker Lions	17
Frankfurt Universe	20*
Schwäbisch Hall Unicorns	23
Dresden Monarchs	7

German Bowl
Frankfurt Universe	19
Schwäbisch Hall Unicorns	21

* indicates overtime win
