= Düsseldorf Panther =

German American football team

- Founded: 1978
- League: German Football League
- Based in: Düsseldorf, Germany
- Stadium: VfL Benrath Stadium
- Colors: Black and Red and White
- Head coach: Jaycee Krieg
- Championships: Eurobowl: 1995 German Bowl: 1983, 1984, 1986, 1992, 1994, 1995 NFL Bowl (Germany): 1980, 1981 Junior Bowl: 1982, 1985, 1986, 1987, 1988, 1991, 1998, 2002, 2003, 2004, 2005, 2006, 2007, 2008, 2010, 2022, 2023, 2024, 2025, 2026
- Website: duesseldorfpanther.de

The Düsseldorf Panther are an American football team from Düsseldorf, Germany. The club is the oldest extant American football club in Europe, having been formed on 1 May 1978.

The Panthers are one of the most successful American football clubs in Germany, having won six German Bowls as well as becoming the first-ever German team to win the Eurobowl in 1995. Having won its 18th Junior Bowl in 2024, the club has the most successful youth department in the sport in Germany.

== History ==
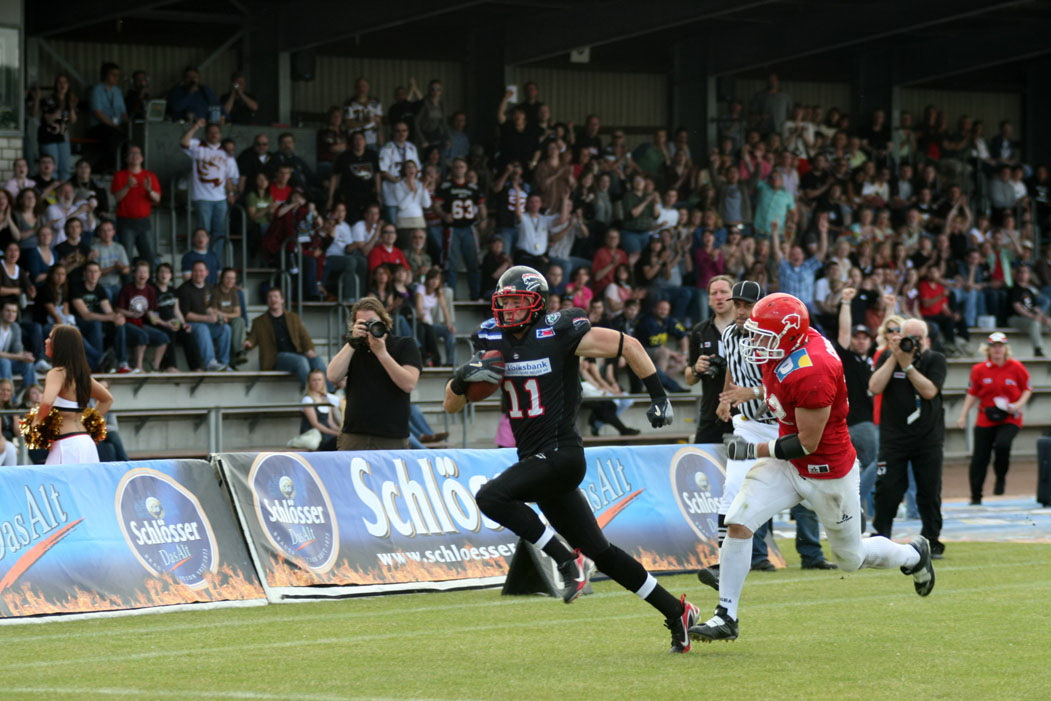
Düsseldorf Panther game, 2008.

The Panthers were formed on 1 May 1978 and, while not the first American football club in Germany—this honour going to the Frankfurter Löwen who were formed in 1977 but folded in the mid-1980s—are the oldest still existing club.

In 1979, the American Football Bundesliga, later to be renamed the German Football League, was formed, consisting of six clubs, the Düsseldorf Panther, Frankfurter Löwen, Ansbach Grizzlies, Munich Cowboys, Berlin Bears and Bremerhaven Seahawks. Of those six, the top two teams would contest the first ever German Bowl on 10 November 1979, however, the Panthers were a long shot from this game, finishing last without a win or point.

The team did not take part in the second or third season of the league, instead forming a rival league with a number of other clubs. The Panthers won this league, the Nordwestdeutsche Football-Liga, the NFL, in 1980 and 1981. Those two titles are however not recognised as national championships and the club, like all others in the league, soon returned to the Bundesliga.

From 1982 to 1986, the league stood under the dominance of the Panthers and the Ansbach Grizzlies, who played each other in four consecutive German Bowls, with the Panthers winning all but the 1985 one. The team remained a strong side after this but was only able to win one more championship, in 1988, in the following four years.

After a 1991 season when the club couldn't qualify for the play-offs, the Panthers returned to their former strength from 1992 onwards, the club experiencing a second golden era until 1996. Three German championships were won, in 1992, 1994 and 1995. In between, in 1993, the club only reached the semi-finals while in 1996, it lost the final. Additionally, the Panthers became the first German side to win the Eurobowl in 1995. From 1995 onwards, the Panthers also had some local competition, with the Rhein Fire, based at Düsseldorf, playing in the NFL Europe until the league folded in 2007.

From the late 1990s, the club suffered from financial trouble and was unable to maintain its high standard. After three seasons of missing the play-offs altogether, the Panthers reached the semi-finals once more in 2000 and the quarter-finals the year after. The year 2001 however saw the club drop out of the league and, for financial reasons, restart in the tier-three Regionalliga West. Success quickly returned, the Panthers won their league and the 2nd Bundesliga in the following year, returning to the GFL by 2004.

Unlike in the past, the Panthers were not a play-off contender anymore, struggling against relegation instead. In 2004, a fifth place was still enough not to have to enter the relegation round, the following two years this was not the case. The team was unable to win a league match in 2005, but was saved in the relegation round when it defeated the Kiel Baltic Hurricanes there. The following season, its league performance was much improved but it could nevertheless only finish last, faced Kiel again in the relegation round and, this time lost.

The Panthers played four seasons at the second level after that, from 2007 to 2010, finishing in mid-table in the first three. In 2010, a second place entitled the club to play in the promotion round courtesy to the expansion of the GFL from 12 to 14 teams. The Panthers were then able to earn promotion to the GFL by narrowly overcoming the Berlin Rebels by a point on aggregate, winning 43–41 in Berlin and losing 33–34 at home.

The Panther's made a successful return to Germany's highest league in 2011, finishing third and qualifying for the play-offs where they met and defeated the Marburg Mercenaries in the quarter-finals and advanced to the semi-finals, where they lost to the Kiel Baltic Hurricanes. In 2012, the club came fourth in the northern division of the GFL and qualified for the play-off where it was knocked out by Schwäbisch Hall Unicorns in the quarter-finals. In the 2013 season the club managed to finish only seventh in its division, thereby missing the play-offs. It came seventh again in 2014 and 2015, each time with only seven teams in the league, with only one win in two seasons. In 2016, they placed dead last once more, however this time the league had its full strength of eight teams, meaning a relegation round of Düsseldorf against the Cologne Crocodiles that had placed first in the GFL2 North. They lost relegation sending them down to the GFL2 for two years, before they again returned (overcoming the Hamburg Huskies in the Relegation round, but lost every single game in the 2019 German Football League including the relegation round against the Elmshorn Fighting Pirates. While Covid-19 led to the cancelation of the planned 2020 season, the 2021 season in the North saw the Hildesheim Invaders and the Elmshorn Fighting Pirates try to join the upstart European League of Football and ultimately withdraw their teams from the GFL after talks fell through with the ELF, thus leaving two open spots for the 2022 German Football League. Düsseldorf, having placed second in the 2021 GFL2 season behind the Berlin Adler would be eligible to fill one of those two spots if they so chose.

== Honours ==
- Eurobowl
  - Champions: 1995
- German Bowl
  - Champions: 1983, 1984, 1986, 1992, 1994, 1995
  - Runners-up: 1985, 1988, 1996
- EFL
  - Participations: 1993, 1995, 1996, 2014
- GFL
  - Northern Division champions: (9) 1983–1988, 1990, 1995, 1996
  - Play-off qualification: (19) 1982–1990, 1992–1996, 2000, 2001, 2011–2012, 2026
  - League membership: (34) 1979, 1982–2001, 2004–2006, 2011–2016, 2019, 2022, 2025–2026
- GFL2:
  - Northern Division champions: 2003, 2018, 2024
- Junior Bowl
  - Champions: (20) 1982, 1985–1988, 1991, 1998, 2002–2008, 2010, 2022–2026
  - Runners-up: 1995, 2011, 2014, 2017, 2018

== German Bowl appearances ==
The club's appearances in the German Bowl:

**Bowl**	**Date**	Champions	**Runners-Up**	**Score**	**Location**	**Attendance**
V	September 25, 1983	Düsseldorf Panther	Ansbach Grizzlies	22–7	Nuremberg	7,000
VI	October 13, 1984	Düsseldorf Panther	Ansbach Grizzlies	27–13	Essen	10,000
VII	November 12, 1985	Ansbach Grizzlies	Düsseldorf Panther	14–7	Cologne	9,000
VIII	July 27, 1986	Düsseldorf Panther	Ansbach Grizzlies	27–14	Würzburg	10,000
X	October 15, 1988	Red Barons Cologne	Düsseldorf Panther	25–20	Berlin	11,000
XIV	October 3, 1992	Düsseldorf Panther	Munich Cowboys	24–23	Hanover	8,750
XVI	September 17, 1994	Düsseldorf Panther	Berlin Adler	27–17	Hanau	7,862
XVII	September 16, 1995	Düsseldorf Panther	Hamburg Blue Devils	17–10	Braunschweig	12,125
XVIII	October 5, 1996	Hamburg Blue Devils	Düsseldorf Panther	31–12	Hamburg	19,700

- Champions in **bold**.

== Recent seasons ==
Recent seasons of the Panthers:

**Year**	**Division**	**Finish**	**Points**	**Pct.**	**Games**	**W**	**D**	**L**	**PF**	**PA**	**Postseason**
2005	GFL (North)	6th	0–24	0.000	12	0	0	12	206	418	**Won** RR: Kiel Baltic Hurricanes (14–13 & 10–7)
2006	GFL (North)	6th	8–16	0.333	12	4	0	8	153	364	Lost RR: Kiel Baltic Hurricanes (0–30 & 30–27)
2007	GFL2 (North)	4th	13–15	0.464	14	6	1	7	291	264	—
2008	GFL2 (North)	4th	17–11	0.607	14	8	1	5	418	343	—
2009	GFL2 (North)	5th	17–11	0.607	14	8	1	5	375	321	—
2010	GFL2 (North)	2nd	23–5	0.821	14	11	1	2	485	259	**Won** PR: Berlin Rebels (43–41 & 33–34)
2011	GFL (North)	3rd	18–10	0.643	14	9	0	5	351	309	**Won** QF: Marburg Mercenaries (14–10) Lost SF: Kiel Baltic Hurricanes (21–45)
2012	GFL (North)	4th	16–12	0.571	14	7	2	5	509	453	Lost QF: Schwäbisch Hall Unicorns (25–41)
2013	GFL (North)	7th	6–22	0.214	14	3	0	11	207	496	—
2014	GFL (North)	7th	0–24	0.000	12	0	0	12	181	517	—
2015	GFL (North)	7th	2–22	0.083	12	1	0	11	87	519	—
2016	GFL (North)	8th	0–28	0.000	14	0	0	14	270	644	Lost RR: Cologne Crocodiles (0–34 & 0–28)
2017	GFL2 (North)	2nd	24–4	0.857	14	12	0	2	517	187	—
2018	GFL2 (North)	1st	24–4	0.857	14	12	0	2	341	148	**Won** PR: Hamburg Huskies (36–10 & 34–21)
2019	GFL (North)	8th	0–28	0.000	14	0	0	14	185	619	Lost RR: Elmshorn Fighting Pirates (14–47 & 21–34)
2020	GFL2 (North)	No season played because of the COVID-19 pandemic									
2021	GFL2 (North)	2nd	17–3	0.850	10	8	1	1	239	174	—
2022	GFL (North)	8th	0–20	0.000	10	0	0	10	67	419	Lost RR: Paderborn Dolphins (7–13 & 13–8)
2023	GFL2 (North)	2nd	16–4	0.800	10	8	–	2	301	182	—
2024	GFL2 (North)	1st	18–2	0.900	10	9	–	1	339	116	—
2025	GFL (North)	6th	10–14	0.417	12	5	–	7	230	311	—
2026	GFL (North)	4th	12–12	0.500	12	6	–	6	265	290	Lost QF: Schwäbisch Hall Unicorns (20–23)

- PR = Promotion round
- RR = Relegation round
- QF = Quarter finals
- SF = Semi finals
