= Potsdam Royals =

American football team from Germany

- Founded: 2005
- League: German Football League
- Based in: Potsdam, Germany
- Stadium: Sportpark Luftschiffhafen
- Colors: Red, Black and White
- Head coach: Michael Vogt
- Championships: GFL Bowl: 2023, 2024, 2025; Eurobowl: 2019; EFL Bowl: 2018
- Website: potsdamroyals.de

The Potsdam Royals are an American football team from Potsdam, Germany.

The club's greatest achievements are winning the German Bowl championship (2023, 2024 & 2025), and the last Eurobowl (2019) against the Amsterdam Crusaders. The Royals currently play in the top tier American Football league in Germany the German Football League.

== History ==
The Royals were formed in 2005 and entered league competition one year later in the fifth tier. Getting promoted after the seasons 2008 and 2009, the Royals finished season 2010 by winning the championship in the third tier league Regionalliga Ost. Winning the subsequent qualification they earned a spot in the German Football League 2. The club rejected the spot and withdrew the football team.

In 2012 the Royals re-entered the competition and had to start again in the fifth tier. With two succeeding perfect seasons the Royals were 2014 back in the Regionalliga Ost. They finished the season with the championship and were promoted to the GFL2. In 2017 the Royals became champions of the GFL2 North with a perfect seasons and won the play-offs to qualify for the German Football League, the highest level in Germany.

== Honours ==
- German Bowl
  - Champions: (3) 2023, 2024, 2025
  - Runners-up: 2022, 2026
- GFL
  - Northern Division champions: (4) 2022–2025
  - Play-off qualification: (6) 2021–2026
  - League membership: (8) 2018–present
- GFL2
  - Northern Division champions: 2017

== German Bowl appearances ==
The club's appearances in the German Bowl:

| Bowl | Date | Champions | Runners-Up | Score | Location | Attendance |
|---|---|---|---|---|---|---|
| XLIII | October 8, 2022 | Schwäbisch Hall Unicorns | Potsdam Royals | 44–27 | Frankfurt | 9,637 |
| GFL Bowl 2023 | October 14, 2023 | Potsdam Royals | Schwäbisch Hall Unicorns | 34–7 | Essen | 9,516 |
| GFL Bowl 2024 | October 12, 2024 | Potsdam Royals | Dresden Monarchs | 27–21 | Essen | 9,721 |
| GFL Bowl 2025 | October 11, 2025 | Potsdam Royals | Dresden Monarchs | 33–23 | Dresden | 22,016 |
| GFL Bowl 2026 | October 3, 2026 | Dresden Monarchs | Potsdam Royals | 27–19 | Dresden | 25,016 |

== Recent seasons ==
Recent seasons of the Royals:

| Year | Division | Finish | Points | Pct. | Games | W | D | L | PF | PA | Postseason |
| 2013 | Oberliga Ost (4th) | 1st | 20–0 | 1.000 | 10 | 10 | 0 | 0 | 249 | 61 | — |
| 2014 | Regionalliga Ost (3rd) | 1st | 16–4 | 0.800 | 10 | 8 | 0 | 2 | 296 | 130 | PR: Osnabrück Tigers (24–38), Paderborn Dolphins (15–38) |
| 2015 | GFL2 (North) | 5th | 14–14 | 0.500 | 14 | 7 | 0 | 7 | 369 | 321 | — |
| 2016 | GFL2 (North) | 3rd | 18–10 | 0.643 | 14 | 9 | 0 | 5 | 422 | 352 | — |
| 2017 | GFL2 (North) | 1st | 28–0 | 1.000 | 14 | 14 | 0 | 0 | 714 | 172 | Won PR: Berlin Adler (55–12 & 42–7) |
| 2018 | GFL (North) | 5th | 12–16 | 0.429 | 14 | 6 | 0 | 8 | 402 | 360 | — |
| 2019 | GFL (North) | 6th | 9–19 | 0.321 | 14 | 4 | 1 | 9 | 243 | 360 | — |
| 2020 | GFL (North) | No season played because of the COVID-19 pandemic | | | | | | | | | |
| 2021 | GFL (North) | 2nd | 14–6 | 0.700 | 10 | 7 | 0 | 3 | 312 | 191 | Won QF: Munich Cowboys (36–23) Lost SF: Schwäbisch Hall Unicorns (18–28) |
| 2022 | GFL (North) | 1st | 20–0 | 1.000 | 10 | 10 | 0 | 0 | 514 | 278 | Won QF: Straubing Spiders (66–25) Won SF: Cologne Crocodiles (49–21) Lost GB: Schwäbisch Hall Unicorns (27–44) |
| 2023 | GFL (North) | 1st | 22–2 | 0.917 | 12 | 11 | – | 1 | 599 | 236 | Won QF: Ingolstadt Dukes (54–0) Won SF: New Yorker Lions (41–28) Won GB: Schwäbisch Hall Unicorns (34–7) |
| 2024 | GFL (North) | 1st | 24–0 | 1.000 | 12 | 12 | – | 0 | 733 | 136 | Won QF: Allgäu Comets (84–20) Won SF: New Yorker Lions (25–6) Won GB: Dresden Monarchs (27–21) |
| 2025 | GFL (North) | 1st | 22–2 | 0.917 | 12 | 11 | – | 1 | 474 | 117 | Won QF: Schwäbisch Hall Unicorns (42–25) Won SF: Munich Cowboys (74–6) Won GB: Dresden Monarchs (33–23) |
| 2026 | GFL (North) | 2nd | 22–2 | 0.917 | 12 | 11 | – | 1 | 583 | 79 | Won QF: Ravensburg Razorbacks (48–21) Won SF: Schwäbisch Hall Unicorns (39–12) Lost GB: Dresden Monarchs (19–27) |

- PR = Promotion round
- QF = Quarter finals
- SF = Semi finals
- GB = German Bowl/GFL Bowl
