= 2026 German Football League =

- League: German Football League
- Sport: American football
- Duration: 9 May – 3 October
- Teams: 15

Regular season

GFL seasons
- ← 2025 2027 →

The 2026 German Football League season is the 47th edition of the top-level American football competition in Germany.

The regular season started on 9 May and ended on 30 August 2026, followed by the play-offs. The season concluded with the GFL Bowl, which was held on 3 October 2026 in Dresden.

== Modus ==
Location of teams in the German Football League 2026

The league is divided in two conferences, north and south, and both conferences are divided in two divisions. During the regular season each club plays all other clubs in its division twice, home and away, and the teams of the other division of its conference once. In addition, each team plays one home and one away game against a team of the other conference, resulting in each team playing 12 regular season games. Since in the northern conference there is one team missing, there are extra games.

The best four teams in each conference qualify for the play-offs where, in the quarter finals, teams from opposite conferences play each other, whereby the better placed teams have home field advantage. The first placed team plays the fourth placed from the other conference and the second placed the third placed team. From the semi-finals onwards teams from the same conference can meet again.

The eighth placed team in the southern conference is relegated to the German Football League 2, the second tier of the league system in Germany. The seventh placed teams of the conferences meet each other in a two-leg play-down. The losing team is relegated to the GFL2. The winner of this contest remains in the GFL for the following season.

== League tables ==
=== GFL ===
The league tables of the two GFL divisions:

==== North ====
Pos	Team	Pld	W	L	PF	PA	PD	PCT	Qualification or relegation
1	Dresden Monarchs	12	12	0	452	153	+299	1.000	Qualification to playoffs
2	Potsdam Royals	12	11	1	583	79	+504	.917	Qualification to playoffs
3	Hildesheim Invaders	12	9	3	348	272	+76	.750	Qualification to playoffs
4	Düsseldorf Panther	12	6	6	265	290	−25	.500	Qualification to playoffs
5	Braunschweig Lions	12	4	8	270	421	−151	.333	
6	Kiel Baltic Hurricanes	12	3	9	184	376	−192	.250	
7	Berlin Rebels	12	2	10	187	363	−176	.167	Playdowns to GFL2

Source: GFL.info, football-aktuell.de

==== South ====
Pos	Team	Pld	W	L	PF	PA	PD	PCT	Qualification or relegation
1	Schwäbisch Hall Unicorns	12	12	0	515	177	+338	1.000	Qualification to play-offs
2	Pforzheim Wilddogs	12	8	4	403	164	+239	.667	Qualification to play-offs
3	Ravensburg Razorbacks	12	8	4	428	238	+190	.667	Qualification to play-offs
4	Munich Cowboys	12	6	6	288	343	−55	.500	Qualification to play-offs
5	Regensburg Phoenix	12	5	7	265	348	−83	.417	
6	Saarland Hurricanes	12	2	10	196	484	−288	.167	
7	Allgäu Comets	12	2	10	153	555	−402	.167	Playdowns to GFL2
8	Straubing Spiders	12	0	12	206	480	−274	.000	Relegation to GFL2

Source: GFL.info, football-aktuell.de

=== GFL2 ===
The league tables of the two GFL2 divisions:

==== GFL2 North ====
Pos	Team	Pld	W	L	PF	PA	PD	PCT	Qualification or relegation
1	Krefeld Ravens	10	10	0	499	168	+331	1.000	Qualification to promotion playoffs
2	Rostock Griffins	10	8	2	414	197	+217	.800	Qualification to promotion playoffs
3	Hamburg Pioneers	10	6	4	264	345	−81	.600	
4	Leipzig Lions	10	4	6	204	274	−70	.400	
5	Elmshorn Fighting Pirates	10	4	6	256	354	−98	.400	
6	Langenfeld Longhorns	10	2	8	181	322	−141	.200	
7	Minden Wolves	10	1	9	185	343	−158	.100	Relegation to Regionalliga

Source: gfl.info, football-aktuell.de
Rules for classification: 1) Winning percentage, 2) Head-to-head results

==== GFL2 South ====
Pos	Team	Pld	W	L	PF	PA	PD	PCT	Qualification or relegation
1	Wiesbaden Phantoms	10	9	1	356	167	+189	.900	Qualification to promotion playoffs
2	Albershausen Crusaders	10	7	3	277	226	+51	.700	Qualification to promotion playoffs
3	Augsburg Centurions	10	6	4	329	190	+139	.600	
4	Montabaur Fighting Farmers	10	5	5	280	205	+75	.500	
5	Gießen Golden Dragons	10	3	7	226	306	−80	.300	
6	Biberach Beavers	10	0	10	84	458	−374	.000	Relegation to Regionalliga

Source: gfl.info, football-aktuell.de
Rules for classification: 1) Winning percentage, 2) Head-to-head results

== Postseason ==
=== GFL Playoffs ===
For the third time in a row the Dresden Monarchs and Potsdam Royals met in the GFL Bowl.

Quarterfinals
S1	Schwäbisch Hall Unicorns	23
N4	Düsseldorf Panther	20
N2	Potsdam Royals	48
S3	Ravensburg Razorbacks	21
N1	Dresden Monarchs	61
S4	Munich Cowboys	14
S2	Pforzheim Wilddogs	21
N3	Hildesheim Invaders	8

Semifinals
Schwäbisch Hall Unicorns	12
Potsdam Royals	39
Dresden Monarchs	36
Pforzheim Wilddogs	7

GFL Bowl
Potsdam Royals	19
Dresden Monarchs	27

=== GFL Playdowns ===
The Allgäu Comets withdrew prior to the playdowns. As a result the Berlin Rebels remain member of the German Football League. The Comets lost their license and have to drop down to the Regionalliga.

=== GFL2 Playoffs ===
Semifinals
N1	Krefeld Ravens	42
S2	Albershausen Crusaders	14
S1	Wiesbaden Phantoms	35
N2	Rostock Griffins	54

GFL2 Bowl
Krefeld Ravens	24
Rostock Griffins	14
