= 2023 German Football League =

- League: German Football League
- Sport: American football
- Duration: 20 May – 14 October
- Teams: 16
- Promoted to GFL: Hildesheim Invaders, Kirchdorf Wildcats
- Relegated to GFL2: Marburg Mercenaries

Regular season
- GFL North champions: Potsdam Royals (2)
- GFL South champions: Schwäbisch Hall Unicorns (13)

GFL Bowl 2023
- Champions: Potsdam Royals
- Runners-up: Schwäbisch Hall Unicorns
- Finals MVP: Jaylon Henderson

GFL seasons
- ← 2022 2024 →

The 2023 German Football League season is the 44th edition of the top-level American football competition in Germany.

The regular season started on 20 May and ended on 10 September 2023, followed by the play-offs. In the GFL Bowl, which was held on 14 October 2023 in Essen, the Potsdam Royals won their first national title.

== Modus ==
Location of teams in the German Football League 2023

The league is divided in two conferences, north and south, and both conferences are divided in two divisions. During the regular season each club plays all other clubs in its division twice, home and away, and the teams of the other division of its conference once. In addition, each team plays one home and one away game against a team of the other conference, resulting in each team playing 12 regular season games.

In case of a tie in standings, the head-to-head record is taken as the first tiebreaker after winning percentage.

The best four teams in each conference qualify for the play-offs where, in the quarter finals, teams from opposite conferences play each other, whereby the better placed teams have home field advantage. The first placed team plays the fourth placed from the other conference and the second placed the third placed team. From the semi-finals onwards teams from the same conference can meet again.

The eighth placed team in the southern conference enters a two-leg play-off with the winner of the respective conference of the German Football League 2, the second tier of the league system in Germany. The winner of this contest qualifies for the GFL for the following season. Had there been eight teams in the northern conference, a similar promotion/relegation round would have been played in the North.

== League tables ==
=== GFL ===
The league tables of the two GFL divisions:

==== GFL North ====
Pos	Team	Pld	W	L	PF	PA	PD	PCT	Qualification or relegation
1	Potsdam Royals	12	11	1	599	236	+363	.917	Qualification to play-offs
2	Dresden Monarchs	12	10	2	488	280	+208	.833	Qualification to play-offs
3	New Yorker Lions	12	10	2	356	175	+181	.833	Qualification to play-offs
4	Berlin Rebels	12	6	6	291	276	+15	.500	Qualification to play-offs
5	Berlin Adler	12	5	7	286	341	−55	.417	
6	Paderborn Dolphins	12	3	9	184	432	−248	.250	
7	Kiel Baltic Hurricanes	12	1	11	259	446	−187	.083	
8	~~Cologne Crocodiles~~ (Note: The Cologne Crocodiles announced their withdrawal in April.)	0	0	0	0	0	0	—	Withdrew before season

Source: gflstats.info, football-aktuell.de

==== GFL South ====
Pos	Team	Pld	W	L	PF	PA	PD	PCT	Qualification or relegation
1	Schwäbisch Hall Unicorns	12	9	3	397	244	+153	.750	Qualification to play-offs
2	Allgäu Comets	12	9	3	389	284	+105	.750	Qualification to play-offs
3	Saarland Hurricanes	12	9	3	465	366	+99	.750	Qualification to play-offs
4	Ingolstadt Dukes	12	6	6	387	340	+47	.500	Qualification to play-offs
5	Munich Cowboys	12	3	9	169	359	−190	.250	
6	Straubing Spiders	12	3	9	204	397	−193	.250	
7	Marburg Mercenaries	12	3	9	251	383	−132	.250	Withdrew after season
8	Ravensburg Razorbacks	12	2	10	209	375	−166	.167	Relegation play-offs to GFL2 (Note: Withdrew the relegation play-off, however remained in the GFL after the withdrawal of the Mercenaries)

Source: gflstats.info, football-aktuell.de

=== GFL2 ===
The league tables of the two GFL2 divisions:

==== GFL2 North ====
Pos	Team	Pld	W	L	PF	PA	PD	PCT	Qualification or relegation
1	Hildesheim Invaders	10	10	0	523	227	+296	1.000	Promotion to GFL
2	Düsseldorf Panther	10	8	2	301	182	+119	.800	
3	Rostock Griffins	10	7	3	404	254	+150	.700	
4	Langenfeld Longhorns	10	4	6	212	230	−18	.400	
5	Lübeck Cougars	10	4	6	288	406	−118	.400	
6	Oldenburg Knights	10	3	7	165	303	−138	.300	
7	Münster Blackhawks	10	2	8	137	352	−215	.200	Relegation to Regionalliga
8	Solingen Paladins	10	2	8	218	294	−76	.200	Relegation to Regionalliga

Source: gflstats.info, football-aktuell.de
Rules for classification: 1) Winning percentage, 2) Head-to-head results

==== GFL2 South ====
Pos	Team	Pld	W	L	PF	PA	PD	PCT	Qualification or relegation
1	Kirchdorf Wildcats	10	9	1	366	163	+203	.900	Qualification to promotion play-off
2	Fursty Razorbacks	10	8	2	268	164	+104	.800	
3	Regensburg Phoenix	10	7	3	336	198	+138	.700	
4	Pforzheim Wilddogs	10	5	5	191	169	+22	.500	
5	Gießen Golden Dragons	10	4	6	257	270	−13	.400	
6	Frankfurt Universe	10	4	6	227	313	−86	.400	
7	Bad Homburg Sentinels	10	2	8	103	235	−132	.200	Relegation to Regionalliga
8	Stuttgart Scorpions	10	1	9	95	331	−236	.100	Relegation to Regionalliga

Source: gflstats.info, football-aktuell.de
Rules for classification: 1) Winning percentage, 2) Head-to-head results

== Postseason ==
=== Relegation and Promotion round ===
In the Northern Division there was no relegation game since there were only seven teams in the league. In the Southern Division the Ravensburg Razorbacks withdrew from playing the relegation game against Kirchdorf Wildcats. Later the Ingolstadt Dukes withdrew their team from the GFL, hence the Razorbacks remained in the GFL and the Wildcats got promoted.

=== Playoffs ===
Quarterfinals
N1	Potsdam Royals	54
S4	Ingolstadt Dukes	0
S2	Allgäu Comets	34
N3	New Yorker Lions	36
S1	Schwäbisch Hall Unicorns	17
N4	Berlin Rebels	7
N2	Dresden Monarchs	45
S3	Saarland Hurricanes	38

Semifinals
N1	Potsdam Royals	41
N3	New Yorker Lions	28
S1	Schwäbisch Hall Unicorns	36
N2	Dresden Monarchs	30

GFL Bowl
N1	Potsdam Royals	34
S1	Schwäbisch Hall Unicorns	7
