= Allgäu Comets =

- Founded: 1982
- League: German Football League
- Team history: Kempten Comets (1982–1993) Allgäu Comets (1994–present)
- Based in: Kempten
- Stadium: Illerstadion
- Colors: Blue and White
- Championships: none
- Cheerleaders: Elements
- Website: allgaeu-comets.de

The Allgäu Comets are an American football team from Kempten, Germany. The club is named after the Allgäu region of Bavaria, of which Kempten is the largest town.

The club was originally formed as the Kempten Comets and renamed Allgäu Comets in 1993. It has played in Germany's highest football league, the American Football Bundesliga, now the German Football League, from 1985 to 1994. In 2013, it won the southern division of the German Football League 2 and earned the right to compete in the GFL once more in 2014, achieving its greatest success in 2015 when it reached the semi-finals of the play-offs.

== History ==
The club was formed in 1982 as the Kempten Comets.

The club entered competitive football in 1983 in the tier two 2nd American Football Bundesliga. It won its division in its second year there and earned the right to play in the Bundesliga from 1985, a spell that would last for ten seasons, until 1994.

In the Bundesliga the Comets most successful era came from 1986 to 1988, when it finished in the top three of the southern division of the league on each occasion and qualified for the play-offs. The club reached the quarter-finals in each of these three years, going out to the Düsseldorf Panther in 1986 and 1988 and the Berlin Adler in 1987. After this the Comets would not reach the play-offs again but remained a competitive side up until the 1994 season. The club's last season in the Bundesliga in 1994, now as the Allgäu Comets, proved disastrous, with the team winning only one out of the first five-season games. The team was withdrawn in mid-season and did not play its final nine games of the 1994 regular season.

The Comets withdrew to the sixth tier Landesliga, a local Bavarian league, for the 1995 season and began their climb back up the league pyramide by winning three consecutive league championships from 1995 to 1997. The club returned to national league level when it re-entered the 2nd Football Bundesliga in 1998 but, after only two seasons, was relegated again in 1999. It returned to the 2nd Bundesliga from 2001 to 2004, achieving good results in its first three seasons there but suffering another relegation in 2004. The Comets once more withdrew to local Bavarian Level for the 2005 season, where they played as a strong side until 2007. The club was promoted to the third tier Regionalliga in 2007 and, after four strong seasons there, to the 2nd Bundesliga, now renamed GFL2, in 2011.

The Allgäu Comets won the southern division of the GFL2 in 2012 and earned the right to play-off with the Munich Cowboys for a place in the GFL in 2013, but lost both games. The club once more won its division in 2013 and, once more, qualified for the promotion round. This time, facing the Wiesbaden Phantoms, the Comets were successful and will return to the highest level of football in Germany, the GFL, for 2014, after a twenty-year absence.

The club came fifth in the southern division of the GFL in 2014 and thereby missed out on play-off qualification. The 2015 season was more successful with the team reaching the EFL Bowl where it lost to the Kiel Baltic Hurricanes and finishing second in the southern division of the GFL. It thereby qualified for the play-offs where it defeated the Kiel Baltic Hurricanes in the quarter-finals but lost to the eventual champion New Yorker Lions in the semi-finals.

== Honours ==
- EFL Bowl
  - Runners-up: 2015
- GFL
  - Play-off qualification: (10) 1986–1988, 2015, 2016, 2018, 2021–2024
  - League membership: (22) 1985–1994, 2014–present
- GFL2
  - Southern Division champions: (4) 1983, (Note: There is not much known about the season 1983. There is no evidence that the Comets won the championship.) 1984, 2012, 2013

== Recent seasons ==
Recent seasons of the club:

Year	Division	Finish	Points	Pct.	Games	W	D	L	PF	PA	Postseason
2012	GFL2 (South)	1st	24–4	0.857	14	12	0	2	585	332	Lost PR: Munich Cowboys (35–59 & 24–33)
2013	GFL2 (South)	1st	24–2	0.923	13	12	0	1	506	247	Won PR: Wiesbaden Phantoms (37–21 & 34–44)
2014	GFL (South)	5th	12–16	0.429	14	6	0	8	464	442	—
2015	GFL (South)	2nd	24–4	0.857	14	12	0	2	527	218	Won QF: Kiel Baltic Hurricanes (39–27) Lost SF: New Yorker Lions (21–42)
2016	GFL (South)	4th	16–12	0.571	14	8	0	6	492	340	Lost QF: New Yorker Lions (6–30)
2017	GFL (South)	5th	12–16	0.429	14	6	0	8	307	428	—
2018	GFL (South)	3rd	16–12	0.571	14	8	0	6	403	488	Lost QF: Dresden Monarchs (19–51)
2019	GFL (South)	6th	10–18	0.357	14	5	0	9	263	406	—
2020	GFL (South)	No season played because of the COVID-19 pandemic									
2021	GFL (South)	4th	12–8	0.600	10	6	0	4	270	162	Lost QF: Dresden Monarchs (13–50)
2022	GFL (South)	3rd	12–8	0.600	10	6	0	4	391	291	Won QF: New Yorker Lions (14–10) Lost SF: Schwäbisch Hall Unicorns (33–8)
2023	GFL (South)	2nd	18–6	0.750	12	9	–	3	389	284	Lost QF: New Yorker Lions (34–36 2OT)
2024	GFL (South)	4th	12–12	0.500	12	6	–	6	301	387	Lost QF: Potsdam Royals (20–84)
2025	GFL (South)	7th	6–18	0.250	12	3	–	9	321	385	—
2026	GFL (South)	7th	4–20	0.167	12	2	–	10	153	555	withdrew before the playdowns

- PR = Promotion round
- QF = Quarter finals
- SF = Semi finals
