= Kirchdorf am Inn =

- Municipality
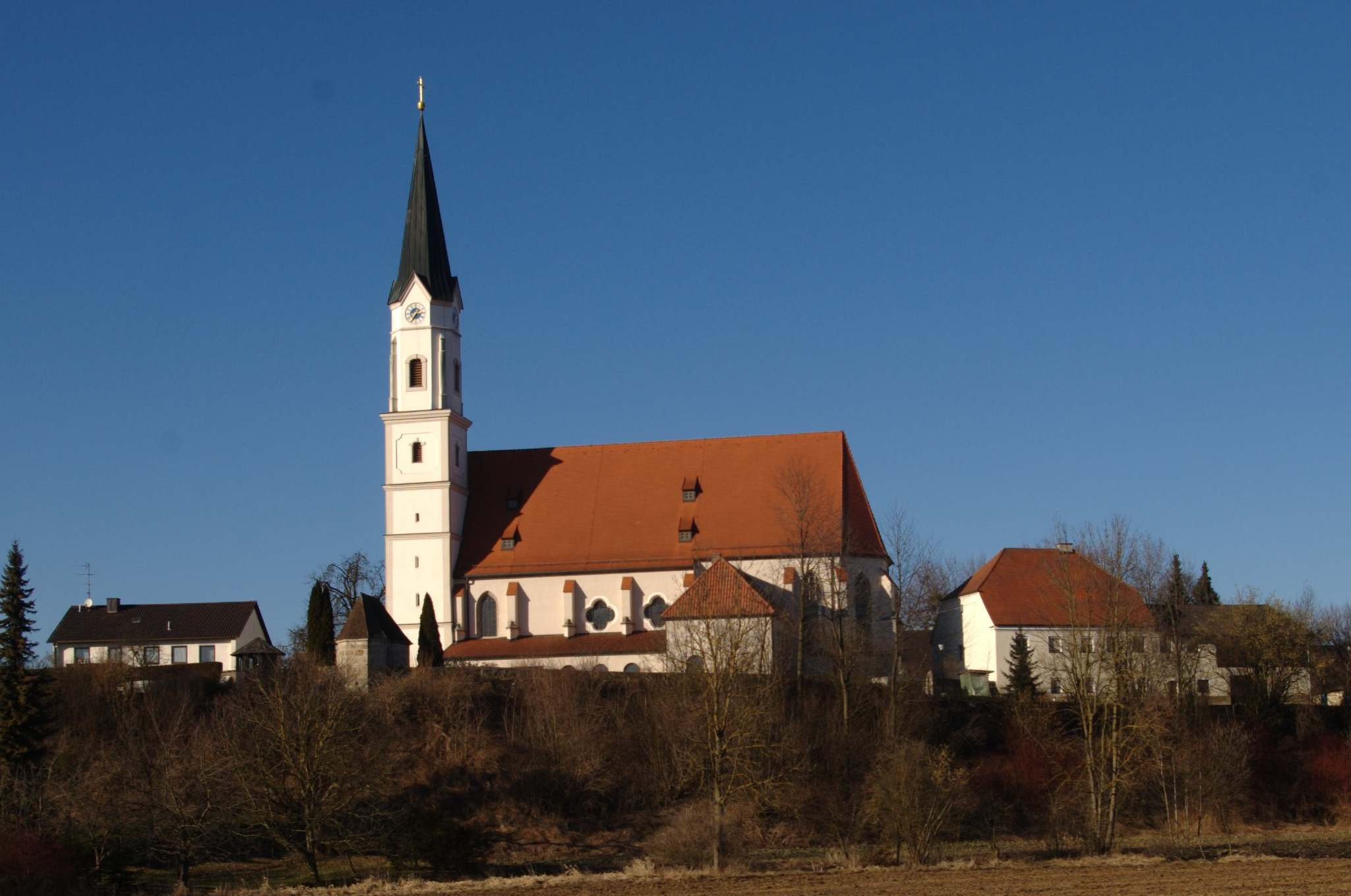
- Church of the Assumption of the Virgin Mary

- Coat of arms

- Location of Kirchdorf am Inn within Rottal-Inn district
- Interactive map of Kirchdorf am Inn
- Location within Germany Location within Bavaria
- Coordinates: 48°14′48.62″N 12°58′58.84″E
- Country: Germany
- State: Bavaria
- Admin. region: Niederbayern
- District: Rottal-Inn
- Subdivisions: 5 Ortsteile

Government
  - Mayor (2020–26): Johann Springer (CSU)

Area
  - Total: 31.64 km^{2} (12.22 sq mi)
- Elevation: 350 m (1,150 ft)

Population (2025-12-31)
  - Total: 5,294
  - Density: 167.3/km^{2} (433.4/sq mi)
- Time zone: UTC+01:00 (CET)
  - Summer (DST): UTC+02:00 (CEST)
- Postal codes: 84375
- Dialling codes: 08571
- Vehicle registration: PAN
- Website: www.kirchdorfaminn.de

Kirchdorf am Inn (German pronunciation: [ˈkɪʁçdɔʁf ʔam ˈʔɪn], lit. 'Kirchdorf on the Inn') is a municipality in the district of Rottal-Inn in Bavaria in Germany. It lies on the river Inn.

== Sports ==
The town is home to the American football club Kirchdorf Wildcats who moved there from Simbach am Inn in 2003 and has played at 2. Bundesliga level, now the German Football League 2, for many seasons.
