= Pforzheim Wilddogs =

American football team from Germany

- Founded: 1990; 36 years ago
- League: German Football League
- Based in: Pforzheim, Germany
- Stadium: Kramski Arena & Sportgelände am Riebergle
- Colors: Blue and Silver
- Website: wilddogs.de

The Pforzheim Wilddogs are an American football team from Pforzheim in Baden-Württemberg, Germany. As its greatest success, the club reached the German Football League, the highest level in Germany, by having won the GFL2 South 2024.

== History ==
The Wilddogs were formed in 1990 in Bretten a town 20 km north of Pforzheim. In 2000 they moved to Pforzheim. In 2006 the Wilddogs qualified for the Regionalliga, the 3rd tier league in Germany, where they remained for only one season.

In the 2022 season the Wilddogs played a perfect season in the 3rd-tier Regionalliga Südwest (southwest). In the promotion round, the Wilddogs won their games against the winners of the southern and the central league and hence got promoted to the GFL2.

In 2023 the Wilddogs played for the first time in the GFL2 and finished with a fourth place in mid-table. One year later, Pforzheim won the championship of the GFL2 South. Since there was a vacant spot in the GFL South they got promoted without playing a play-off-game.

The Wilddogs finished their first season in the GFL South in third place and due to that got a playoff spot.

== Honours ==
- GFL
  - Play-off qualification: 2025, 2026
  - League membership: 2025–present
- GFL2
  - Southern Division champions: 2024

== GFL seasons ==
Year	League	Finish	Points	Pct.	Games	W	L	PF	PA	Postseason
2023	GFL2 (South)	4th	10–10	0.500	10	5	5	191	169	—
2024	GFL2 (South)	1st	18–2	0.900	10	9	1	332	165	Promotion
2025	GFL (South)	3rd	12–12	0.500	12	6	6	328	298	Lost QF @ Dresden Monarchs (22–41)
2026	GFL (South)	2nd	16–8	0.667	12	8	4	403	164	Won QF vs. Hildesheim Invaders (21–8); Lost SF @ Dresden Monarchs (7–36)

- QF = Quarter finals.

Source: gflstats.info
