= 2024 German Football League =

- League: German Football League
- Sport: American football
- Duration: 11 May – 12 October
- Teams: 15

Regular season
- GFL North champions: Potsdam Royals
- GFL South champions: Schwäbisch Hall Unicorns

GFL Bowl 2024
- Champions: Potsdam Royals
- Runners-up: Dresden Monarchs
- Finals MVP: Jaylon Henderson

GFL seasons
- ← 2023 2025 →

The 2024 German Football League season is the 45th edition of the top-level American football competition in Germany.

The regular season started on 11 May and ended on 8 September 2024, followed by the play-offs. The season concluded with the GFL Bowl, which was held on 12 October 2024 in Essen.

== Modus ==
Location of teams in the German Football League 2024

The league is divided in two conferences, north and south, and both conferences are divided in two divisions. During the regular season each club plays all other clubs in its division twice, home and away, and the teams of the other division of its conference once. In addition, each team plays one home and one away game against a team of the other conference, resulting in each team playing 12 regular season games. Since in the southern conference there is one team missing, there are extra games.

The best four teams in each conference qualify for the play-offs where, in the quarter finals, teams from opposite conferences play each other, whereby the better placed teams have home field advantage. The first placed team plays the fourth placed from the other conference and the second placed the third placed team. From the semi-finals onwards teams from the same conference can meet again.

The eighth placed team in the northern conference enters a two-leg play-off with the winner of the respective conference of the German Football League 2, the second tier of the league system in Germany. The winner of this contest qualifies for the GFL for the following season.

== League tables ==
=== GFL ===
The league tables of the two GFL divisions:

==== GFL North ====
Pos	Team	Pld	W	L	PF	PA	PD	PCT	Qualification or relegation
1	Potsdam Royals	12	12	0	733	136	+597	1.000	Qualification to play-offs
2	Dresden Monarchs	12	10	2	363	156	+207	.833	Qualification to play-offs
3	New Yorker Lions	12	7	5	252	215	+37	.583	Qualification to play-offs
4	Hildesheim Invaders	12	7	5	398	357	+41	.583	Qualification to play-offs
5	Berlin Rebels	12	6	6	301	387	−86	.500	
6	Kiel Baltic Hurricanes	12	5	7	312	276	+36	.417	
7	Paderborn Dolphins	12	5	7	188	355	−167	.417	
8	Berlin Adler	12	0	12	0	432	−432	.000	Withdrew during the season

Source: gflstats.info, football-aktuell.de

==== GFL South ====
Pos	Team	Pld	W	L	PF	PA	PD	PCT	Qualification or relegation
1	Schwäbisch Hall Unicorns	12	9	3	367	319	+48	.750	Qualification to play-offs
2	Ravensburg Razorbacks	12	7	5	351	315	+36	.583	Qualification to play-offs
3	Straubing Spiders	12	7	5	294	238	+56	.583	Qualification to play-offs
4	Allgäu Comets	12	6	6	385	458	−73	.500	Qualification to play-offs
5	Munich Cowboys	12	5	7	254	273	−19	.417	
6	Saarland Hurricanes	12	3	9	301	390	−89	.250	
7	Kirchdorf Wildcats	12	1	11	173	365	−192	.083	

Source: gflstats.info, football-aktuell.de

=== GFL2 ===
The league tables of the two GFL2 divisions:

==== GFL2 North ====
Pos	Team	Pld	W	L	PF	PA	PD	PCT	Qualification or relegation
1	Düsseldorf Panther	10	9	1	339	116	+223	.900	Qualification to promotion play-off
2	Rostock Griffins	10	8	2	372	212	+160	.800	
3	Hamburg Pioneers	10	7	3	326	286	+40	.700	
4	Langenfeld Longhorns	10	5	5	293	256	+37	.500	
5	Lübeck Cougars	10	3	7	211	275	−64	.300	
6	Oldenburg Knights	10	3	7	174	313	−139	.300	
7	Bielefeld Bulldogs	10	3	7	224	300	−76	.300	Relegation to Regionalliga
8	Cottbus Crayfish	10	2	8	248	429	−181	.200	Relegation to Regionalliga

Source: gflstats.info, football-aktuell.de
Rules for classification: 1) Winning percentage, 2) Head-to-head results

==== GFL2 South ====
Pos	Team	Pld	W	L	PF	PA	PD	PCT	Qualification or relegation
1	Pforzheim Wilddogs	10	9	1	332	165	+167	.900	Qualification to promotion play-off
2	Montabaur Fighting Farmers	10	8	2	253	219	+34	.800	
3	Regensburg Phoenix	10	6	4	199	131	+68	.600	
4	Gießen Golden Dragons	10	3	7	123	261	−138	.300	
5	Fursty Razorbacks	10	2	8	136	180	−44	.200	
6	Albershausen Crusaders	10	2	8	114	201	−87	.200	

Source: gflstats.info, football-aktuell.de
Rules for classification: 1) Winning percentage, 2) Head-to-head results

== Postseason ==
=== Playoffs ===
Quarterfinals
N1	Potsdam Royals	84
S4	Allgäu Comets	20
S2	Ravensburg Razorbacks	14
N3	New Yorker Lions	45
N2	Dresden Monarchs	35
S3	Straubing Spiders	6
S1	Schwäbisch Hall Unicorns	28
N4	Hildesheim Invaders	31

Semifinals
Potsdam Royals	25
New Yorker Lions	6
Dresden Monarchs	27
Hildesheim Invaders	13

GFL Bowl
Potsdam Royals	27
Dresden Monarchs	21
