= Wiesbaden Phantoms =

- Founded: 1984
- League: American football Regionalliga
- Based in: Wiesbaden, Germany
- Stadium: Europaviertel
- Colors: Blue and Yellow
- Head coach: David Gordon
- Championships: none
- Cheerleaders: Phantastics
- Website: wiesbaden-phantoms.de

The Wiesbaden Phantoms are an American football team from Wiesbaden, Germany.

The team experienced its greatest success in 2010, earning promotion to the German Football League.

== History ==
The club was formed in 1984, originally as a department of a local association football club and, from 1986, independent as the AFC Wiesbaden Phantoms e.V..

The Wiesbaden Phantoms first entered league football in 1985, when they joined the tier-three Regionalliga Mitte. In this league, the club was instantaneously successful, winning it in 1985 and 1986. The Phantoms earned promotion to the central division of the 2nd Bundesliga on the strength of these titles, a league the club would play in for the next six seasons. The team's best result in this era was a second place in 1991, but a sixth-place finish the following season saw the club relegated back to the Regionalliga.

The following four seasons saw the club in decline, so much so that it dropped all the way to the fifth tier Landesliga for 1998, having been unable to field a team in 1997, but it was able to recover and begun its climb back up with a title in this division. By 2000, the club was back in the third division, where it became a top side without quite achieving another promotion until 2003, when the Phantoms once more won their league and returned to the 2nd Bundesliga.

Like in the Regionalliga, the club was a strong side in the southern division of this league, finishing runners-up on five occasions in the next seven seasons. Another runners-up finish in 2010, in a league now renamed German Football League 2, saw the team qualify for the promotion round because of an enlargement of the GFL from 12 to 14 teams. The Phantoms beat the Weinheim Longhorns convincingly in both promotion games and thereby achieved entry to Germany's elite league for the first time.

The club came fifth in its first season in the GFL in 2011, well clear of the play-off ranks with only three wins and a draw to its name. In 2012, the club came sixth in the southern division of the GFL and thereby failed to qualify for the play-offs.

The 2013 season saw the club come last in the southern division and having to enter the relegation round where it lost to Allgäu Comets and was relegated from the GFL to the GFL2, where it came second in 2014 and fifth in 2015.

2016 the Phantoms reached a 10–4 record under Head Coach Patrick Griesheimer and became third best team of the GFL2 but decreased to 4–7–1 in 2017. After finishing the season only on sixth place in 2016 the Phantoms changed their coaching staff. In 2017 Andy McMillan became Head Coach of the Phantoms to play two seasons with the team - McMillan had a 7–7 record in his first and a 5–7 record in his second season – worth a fifth and a sixth place in the GFL2.

In 2020 the Phantoms did not play a season because of the COVID-19 pandemic. Tibor Gohmert – former coach of the GFL team Marburg Mercenaries – became new Head Coach in 2020, coaching his first season in 2021 to a 1-1-6 record. Midway through the a nearly winless 2022 season, the Wiesbaden Phantoms announced that the club and Coach Gohmert were parting ways and promoted Offensive Line coach David Gorden to the interim Head Coach position. Coach Gordon formally took over the position of Head Coach in the 2022-2023 offseason.

After relegation to the Regionalliga - Mitte, Coach Gordon's team found instant success in 2023 starting the season as the inaugural winners of the recently revived Hessenpokal. The teams winning ways continued through the season, coming within one game of promotion back to the GFL2 by leading the team to a 9-1-0 record. The team began the 2024 season repeating as Hessenpokal champions.

== Honours ==
- GFL
  - League membership: (3) 2011–2013
- Regionalliga
  - Hessenpokal Champions: 2023, 2024

== Recent seasons ==
Recent seasons of the club:

Year	Division	Finish	Points	Pct.	Games	W	D	L	PF	PA	Postseason
2005	GFL2 (South)	2nd	24–4	0.857	14	12	0	2	434	268	—
2006	GFL2 (South)	2nd	24–4	0.857	14	12	0	2	385	167	—
2007	GFL2 (South)	4th	15–13	0.536	14	7	1	6	281	252	—
2008	GFL2 (South)	3rd	23–5	0.821	14	11	1	2	512	229	—
2009	GFL2 (South)	2nd	22–6	0.786	14	11	0	3	484	129	—
2010	GFL2 (South)	2nd	20–8	0.714	14	10	0	4	388	175	Won PR: Weinheim Longhorns (45–7 & 30–26)
2011	GFL (South)	5th	7–19	0.269	13	3	1	9	241	366	—
2012	GFL (South)	6th	8–20	0.286	14	4	0	10	300	408	—
2013	GFL (South)	8th	4–24	0.143	14	2	0	12	283	419	Lost RR: Allgäu Comets (21–37 & 44–34)
2014	GFL2 (South)	2nd	17–11	0.607	14	8	1	5	233	214	—
2015	GFL2 (South)	5th	14–14	0.500	14	7	0	7	291	369	—
2016	GFL2 (South)	3rd	20–8	0.714	14	10	0	4	465	324	—
2017	GFL2 (South)	5th	9–15	0.375	12	4	1	7	309	390	—
2018	GFL2 (South)	5th	14–14	0.500	14	7	0	7	342	392	—
2019	GFL2 (South)	5th	12–14	0.417	12	5	0	7	301	304	—
2020	GFL2 (South)	No season played because of the COVID-19 pandemic									
2021	GFL2 (South)	5th	3–13	0.188	8	1	1	6	72	216	—
2022	GFL2 (South)	7th	2–18	0.100	10	1	0	9	147	302	—
2023	Regionalliga	2nd	18–2	0.900	10	9	0	1	366	83	—
2024	Regionalliga	1st	20–0	1.000	10	10	0	0	392	90	Directly promoted to GFL2 without promotion round
2025	GFL2 (South)	4th	10–10	0.500	10	5	–	5	247	220	—
2026	GFL2 (South)	1st	18–2	0.900	10	9	–	1	356	167	Lost SF: Rostock Griffins (35–54)

- RR = Relegation round
- PR = Promotion round
- SF = Semi finals
- In the 2011 season, the game against Plattling Black Hawks was not played.
