= Berlin Rebels =

German professional American football team

- Founded: 1987
- League: German Football League
- Based in: Berlin, Germany
- Arena: Mommsenstadion
- Colors: Black and Silver
- Championships: Junior Bowl: 1992, 1996, 2000
- Website: berlin-rebels.de

The Berlin Rebels are an American football team from Berlin, Germany.

The team is playing in the German Football League, the highest level of American football in Germany. In the most recent seasons the Rebels managed to qualify for the play-offs.

At junior level, the club had more success, having taken out the German Junior Bowl on three occasions, in 1992, 1996 and 2000.

== History ==
The club was formed in 1987, as the American Football department of the SC Charlottenburg.

The Rebels entered league football in 1988, playing for a season in the third tier Verbandsliga Nord before entering the 2nd American Football Bundesliga, now the GFL2, in the following year. The club spent three seasons there until a division championship, won without dropping a game, earned it promotion to Germany's highest league.

Four seasons in the GFL followed in which the team never finished better than fifth in its division and consequently missed out on the post season each time. In 1995 it finished sixth in its division and was relegated back to the second tier. The Rebels were a strong side at this level again, taking out division championships in 1996 and 1998. In 1998, it took part in the promotion round to the GFL but missed out to Paderborn Dolphins. After this, the club decided to withdraw from league football altogether and took a two-year break.

The Rebels returned in 2001, now playing in the fourth division Oberliga Ost. A championship there earned the side promotion to the Regionalliga Ost, where it spent another two years before making a return to the 2nd Bundesliga. The first season there went well for the club, coming second in the northern division but after that three average seasons followed with fifth and sixth places.

In 2009, the club won another division championship and moved up to the GFL once more. It was to be a short visit, the Rebels came last and were forced to play the Düsseldorf Panther in the promotion-relegation round. Two very tight games followed. The Rebels lost at home 41–43 but managed to defeat the Panthers in Düsseldorf 34–33. Nevertheless, this was not enough, the Rebels were relegated on aggregate score by a point.

The 2011 season provided an opportunity for easier promotion from the GFL2 as the GFL was to be enlarged from 14 to 16 teams and, consequently, the division champions were promoted directly and the runners-up had the right to play the last placed GFL teams. The Rebels came second in the northern division, behind the Hamburg Blue Devils but were spared the promotion round when the last placed GFL team, the Assindia Cardinals, decided to withdraw from the league to the GFL2 for financial reasons. In 2012, the club came fifth in the northern division of the GFL and failed to qualify for the play-off, a result repeated in 2013. It missed out on the play-offs in 2014 and 2015, too after coming sixth and fifth in the league.

In 2016, the Rebels finished their division on a fourth rank and qualified for the play-offs. In the quarter-finals they lost against the Schwäbisch Hall Unicorns. The following season was a perfect copy. Again the Rebels finished fourth and lost their quarter final in Schwäbisch Hall, but this time the Unicorns needed an overtime. In 2018 the Rebels played their most successful season. Only a half win short to division champs New Yorker Lions and runners-up Dresden Monarchs they finished third. Their third consecutive quarter finals appearance they lost against Frankfurt Universe.

== Honours ==
- GFL
  - Play-off qualification: (6) 2016–2019, 2023, 2025
  - League membership: (19) 1992–1995, 2010, 2012–present
- GFL2
  - Northern Division champions: (4) 1991, 1996, 1998, 2009
- Junior Bowl
  - Champions: 1992, 1996, 2000

== Recent seasons ==
Recent seasons of the club:

Year	Division	Finish	Points	Pct.	Games	W	D	L	PF	PA	Postseason
2005	GFL2 (North)	2nd	24–4	0.857	14	12	0	2	481	143	—
2006	GFL2 (North)	5th	9–13	0.409	11	4	1	6	107	167	—
2007	GFL2 (North)	5th	11–15	0.423	13	5	1	7	177	224	—
2008	GFL2 (North)	6th	12–16	0.429	14	6	0	8	205	337	—
2009	GFL2 (North)	1st	21–7	0.750	14	10	1	3	284	218	—
2010	GFL (North)	6th	8–16	0.333	12	3	2	7	188	202	Lost RR: Düsseldorf Panther (41–43 & 34–33)
2011	GFL2 (North)	2nd	13–7	0.650	10	6	1	3	267	161	—
2012	GFL (North)	5th	13–15	0.464	14	6	1	7	371	258	—
2013	GFL (North)	5th	12–16	0.429	14	6	0	8	365	360	—
2014	GFL (North)	6th	4–20	0.167	12	2	0	10	174	495	—
2015	GFL (North)	5th	8–16	0.333	12	4	0	8	296	337	—
2016	GFL (North)	4th	21–7	0.750	14	10	1	3	494	315	Lost QF: Schwäbisch Hall Unicorns (14–24)
2017	GFL (North)	4th	16–12	0.571	14	8	0	6	462	313	Lost QF: Schwäbisch Hall Unicorns (24–31)
2018	GFL (North)	3rd	22–6	0.786	14	11	0	3	367	211	Lost QF: Frankfurt Universe (5–6)
2019	GFL (North)	4th	16–12	0.571	14	8	0	6	387	302	Lost QF: Schwäbisch Hall Unicorns (24–45)
2020	GFL (North)	No season played because of the COVID-19 pandemic									
2021	GFL (North)	6th	2–18	0.100	10	1	0	9	118	297	—
2022	GFL (North)	6th	7–13	0.350	10	3	1	6	348	371	—
2023	GFL (North)	4th	12–12	0.500	12	6	–	6	291	276	Lost QF: Schwäbisch Hall Unicorns (7–17)
2024	GFL (North)	5th	12–12	0.500	12	6	–	6	301	387	—
2025	GFL (North)	3rd	16–8	0.667	12	8	–	4	351	326	Lost QF: Munich Cowboys (31–44)
2026	GFL (North)	7th	4–20	0.167	12	2	–	10	187	363	—

- RR = Relegation round
- QF = Quarter finals
- In 2006, the home game against the Kiel Baltic Hurricanes was not played, therefore only 11 games.
- In 2007, the home game against the Langenfeld Longhorns was not played, therefore only 13 games.
