= Munich Cowboys =

American football team based in Munich, Germany

- Founded: 1979
- League: German Football League
- Based in: Munich, Germany
- Stadium: Dantestadion
- Colors: Black and Gold
- President: Werner L. Maier
- Head coach: Christos Lambropoulos
- Championships: German Bowl: 1993 Ladies Bowl: 2005, 2006
- Cheerleaders: Munich Cowboys Cheerleader
- Mascot: Lucky Muc
- Website: munich-cowboys.de

The Munich Cowboys are an American football team based in Munich, Germany. The club, together with the Düsseldorf Panther and the Ansbach Grizzlies, is one of the oldest in Germany. The team refers to itself as The Grand Old Team of the South.

The club has one national championship to its name, winning the German Bowl in 1993. As of 2015, the club has played more GFL games than any other team, 405, followed by the Berlin Adler with 378, one of only three other teams with more than 300 league games. The Cowboys have played 35 out of a possible 38 seasons at the highest level of the game in Germany, more than any other club.

== History ==
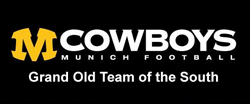
The Grand Old Team of the South

American football in Munich dates back to 1975 when local football enthusiasts met with soldiers of the US Army to play the game. In 1979, the Munich Cowboys club was formed.

In 1979, the Cowboys became a founding member of the American Football Bundesliga, renamed the German Football League in 1999, together with the Frankfurter Löwen, Düsseldorf Panther, Ansbach Grizzlies, Berlin Bears and Bremerhaven Seahawks.

The Cowboys made their first appearance in the national championship game, the German Bowl, in 1992, but lost the game to the Düsseldorf Panther by a point.

The 1993 season saw the club's greatest success. It reached the German Bowl once more, this time against the Cologne Crocodiles. Playing at home in Munich, the Cowboys where 7–20 behind at half time but managed to equalise 29–29 at the end of regular time. The team then turned the game around and defeated the Crocodiles 42–36 to win their first, and as of 2019, only national championship.

After an era of lesser success, the team came close to reaching the German Bowl once more in 2000 and 2001 when, on both occasions, Munich lost to the Braunschweig Lions in the semi-finals.

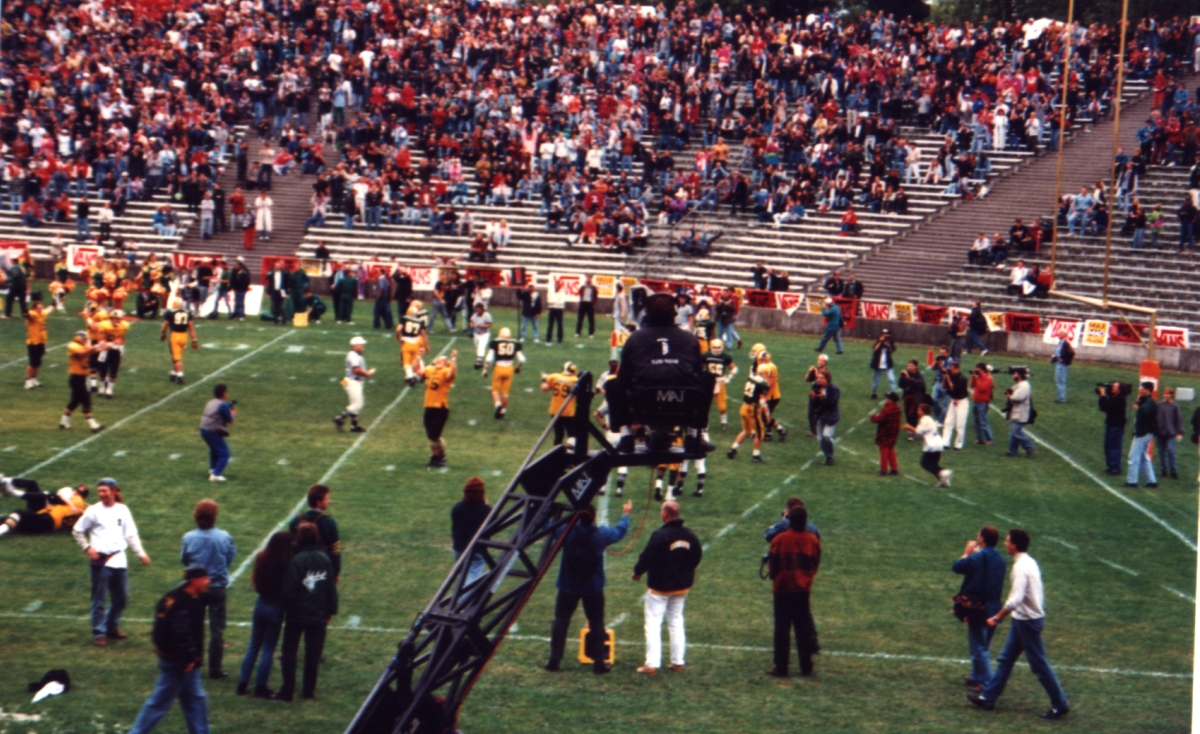
The Munich Cowboys win the German Bowl in 1993.

After 22 consecutive seasons at the highest level of German football, the Bundesliga and, later, the GFL, the Cowboys withdrew to the tier-three Regionalliga Süd for the 2003 season. The clubs exile in the lower leagues was short-lived, winning promotion to the GFL2 on first attempt and, from there, to the GFL in 2004. The team was however relegated from the GFL again in 2006.

Munich returned to the GFL in the 2008 season and came third in the southern division, losing once more to the Braunschweig Lions in the play-offs. The year 2009 was less successful and the Cowboys were almost relegated once more.

The team continued to be present in the GFL in 2010, where it was once more troubled by relegation fears but survived and will stay in the league for 2011. Phil Hickey, coach of the team and a member of the 1993 championship-winning side, is confident that he can take the Cowboys back to championship contention by 2012.

The club suffers from strong competition within the city from other sports, especially the association football clubs FC Bayern Munich and TSV 1860 Munich as well as the ice hockey team EHC München. Additionally, the ambitious basketball team of the FC Bayern Munich took over the clubs cheerleading team in 2009. The Cowboys, who attracted 1,100 spectators per game in 2009 suffered a 30 percent drop in attendance in 2010. In 2011, the Cowboys finished fourth in their division and qualified for the play-offs once more, where they were knocked out by the Kiel Baltic Hurricanes in the quarter finals. In 2012, the club came eighth in the southern division of the GFL, having to face GFL2 southern champions Allgäu Comets in the promotion-relegation play-off in which the Cowboys won both games and survived. The 2013 season saw a much improved performance with the team finishing third but being knocked out in the quarter finals of the play-offs by the Dresden Monarchs.

In the 2014 season the club finished fourth in the southern division of the GFL but lost 28–69 to the NewYorker Lions in the quarter finals of the play-offs. The following season they missed out on play-off qualification after finishing fifth.

The Munich Cowboys Ladies team has been quite successful in its recent past, reaching the Ladies Bowl on five occasions and winning it in 2005 and 2006.

== Honours ==
=== Men ===
- German Bowl
  - Champions: 1993
  - Runners-up: 1992
- EFL
  - Participations: 1994
- GFL
  - Southern Division champions: (6) 1990, 1992, 1993, 1994, 2000, 2001
  - Play-off qualification: (26) 1982–85, 1989–2001, 2008, 2011, 2013, 2014, 2018, 2021, 2022, 2025, 2026
  - League membership: (44) 1979–2002, 2005–2006, 2008–present
- GFL2
  - Southern Division champions: 2004, 2007

=== Women ===
- Ladies Bowl
  - Champions: 2005, 2006
  - Runners-up: 2001, 2002, 2003

=== Juniors ===
- Junior Bowl
  - Runners-up: 1986, 1987, 1996

== German Bowl appearances ==
The club's appearances in the German Bowl:

Bowl	Date	Champions	Runners-Up	Score	Location	Attendance
XIV	3 October 1992	Düsseldorf Panther	Munich Cowboys	24–23	Hanover	8,750
XV	25 September 1993	Munich Cowboys	Cologne Crocodiles	42–36 (aet)	Munich	10,100

== Recent seasons ==
Recent seasons of the Munich Cowboys:

Year	Division	Finish	Points	Pct.	Games	W	D	L	PF	PA	Postseason
2004	2. BL (South)	1st	20–4	0.833	12	10	0	2	387	131	—
2005	GFL (South)	5th	2–18	0.100	10	1	0	9	87	321	—
2006	GFL (South)	6th	3–21	0.125	12	1	1	10	154	476	Lost RR: Weinheim Longhorns (0–20 & 14–27)
2007	GFL2 (South)	1st	27–1	0.964	14	13	1	0	379	166	Won PR: Saarland Hurricanes (48–2 & 25–7)
2008	GFL (South)	3rd	14–10	0.583	12	7	0	5	224	164	Lost QF: Braunschweig Lions (10–32)
2009	GFL (South)	6th	4–20	0.167	12	2	0	10	151	261	Won RR: Franken Knights (28–24 & 19–7)
2010	GFL (South)	5th	6–18	0.250	12	3	0	9	174	411	—
2011	GFL (South)	4th	14–14	0.500	14	7	0	7	256	277	Lost QF: Kiel Baltic Hurricanes (6–45)
2012	GFL (South)	8th	5–23	0.179	14	2	1	11	297	473	Won RR: Allgäu Comets (59–35 & 33–24)
2013	GFL (South)	3rd	19–9	0.679	14	9	1	4	380	275	Lost QF: Dresden Monarchs (14–59)
2014	GFL (South)	4th	16–12	0.571	14	8	0	6	454	453	Lost QF: New Yorker Lions (28–69)
2015	GFL (South)	5th	14–14	0.500	14	7	0	7	312	380	—
2016	GFL (South)	6th	10–18	0.357	14	5	0	9	335	560	—
2017	GFL (South)	7th	6–22	0.214	14	3	0	11	278	489	—
2018	GFL (South)	4th	12–16	0.429	14	6	0	8	290	373	Lost QF: New Yorker Lions (14–59)
2019	GFL (South)	7th	7–21	0.250	14	3	1	10	238	423	—
2020	GFL (South)	No season played because of the COVID-19 pandemic									
2021	GFL (South)	3rd	12–8	0.600	10	6	0	4	289	118	Lost QF: Potsdam Royals (23–36)
2022	GFL (South)	2nd	17–3	0.850	10	8	1	1	303	176	Lost QF: Cologne Crocodiles (31–34)
2023	GFL (South)	5th	6–18	0.250	12	3	–	9	169	359	—
2024	GFL (South)	5th	10–14	0.417	12	5	–	7	254	273	—
2025	GFL (South)	2nd	12–12	0.500	12	6	–	6	222	276	Won QF: Berlin Rebels (44–31); Lost QF: Potsdam Royals (6–74)
2026	GFL (South)	4th	12–12	0.500	12	6	–	6	288	343	Lost QF: Dresden Monarchs (14–61)

- PR = Promotion round.
- RR = Relegation round.
- QF = Quarter finals.
