= 2025 German Football League =

- League: German Football League
- Sport: American football
- Duration: 10 May – 11 October
- Teams: 16

Regular season
- GFL North champions: Potsdam Royals
- GFL South champions: Ravensburg Razorbacks

GFL Bowl 2025
- Champions: Potsdam Royals
- Runners-up: Dresden Monarchs

GFL seasons
- ← 2024 2026 →

The 2025 German Football League season is the 46th edition of the top-level American football competition in Germany.

The regular season started on 10 May and is expected to end on 7 September 2025, followed by the play-offs. The season will be concluded with the GFL Bowl, which is planned to be held on 11 October 2025 in Dresden.

== Modus ==
Location of teams in the German Football League 2025

The league is divided in two conferences, north and south, and both conferences are divided in two divisions. During the regular season each club plays all other clubs in its division twice, home and away, and the teams of the other division of its conference once. In addition, each team plays one home and one away game against a team of the other conference, resulting in each team playing 12 regular season games. Since in the southern conference there is one team missing, there are extra games.

The best four teams in each conference qualify for the play-offs where, in the quarter finals, teams from opposite conferences play each other, whereby the better placed teams have home field advantage. The first placed team plays the fourth placed from the other conference and the second placed the third placed team. From the semi-finals onwards teams from the same conference can meet again.

The eighth placed team in each conference enters a two-leg play-off with the winner of the respective conference of the German Football League 2, the second tier of the league system in Germany. The winner of this contest qualifies for the GFL for the following season.

== League tables ==
=== GFL ===
The league tables of the two GFL divisions:

==== North ====
Pos	Team	Pld	W	L	PF	PA	PD	PCT	Qualification or relegation
1	Potsdam Royals	12	11	1	474	117	+357	.917	Qualification to play-offs
2	Dresden Monarchs	12	11	1	505	240	+265	.917	Qualification to play-offs
3	Berlin Rebels	12	8	4	351	326	+25	.667	Qualification to play-offs
4	Kiel Baltic Hurricanes	12	7	5	354	327	+27	.583	Qualification to play-offs
5	New Yorker Lions	12	7	5	367	276	+91	.583	
6	Düsseldorf Panther	12	5	7	230	311	−81	.417	
7	Hildesheim Invaders	12	4	8	240	367	−127	.333	
8	Paderborn Dolphins	12	1	11	186	542	−356	.083	Relegation play-offs to GFL2

Source: GFL.info, football-aktuell.de

==== South ====
Pos	Team	Pld	W	L	PF	PA	PD	PCT	Qualification or relegation
1	Ravensburg Razorbacks	12	8	4	432	350	+82	.667	Qualification to play-offs
2	Munich Cowboys	12	6	6	222	276	−54	.500	Qualification to play-offs
3	Pforzheim Wilddogs	12	6	6	328	298	+30	.500	Qualification to play-offs
4	Schwäbisch Hall Unicorns	12	6	6	313	337	−24	.500	Qualification to play-offs
5	Saarland Hurricanes	12	4	8	338	398	−60	.333	
6	Straubing Spiders	12	3	9	268	379	−111	.250	
7	Allgäu Comets	12	3	9	321	385	−64	.250	
8	Kirchdorf Wildcats	0	0	0	0	0	0	—	Withdrew before season

Source: GFL.info, football-aktuell.de

=== GFL2 ===
The league tables of the two GFL2 divisions:

==== GFL2 North ====
Pos	Team	Pld	W	L	PF	PA	PD	PCT	Qualification or relegation
1	Hamburg Pioneers	10	8	2	385	245	+140	.800	Qualification to promotion play-off
2	Rostock Griffins	10	8	2	372	237	+135	.800	
3	Krefeld Ravens	10	8	2	332	180	+152	.800	
4	Langenfeld Longhorns	10	4	6	267	275	−8	.400	
5	Elmshorn Fighting Pirates	10	4	6	301	362	−61	.400	
6	Leipzig Lions	10	2	8	223	355	−132	.200	
7	Lübeck Cougars	10	1	9	159	385	−226	.100	Relegation to Regionalliga

Source: gfl.info, football-aktuell.de
Rules for classification: 1) Winning percentage, 2) Head-to-head results

==== GFL2 South ====
Pos	Team	Pld	W	L	PF	PA	PD	PCT	Qualification or relegation
1	Regensburg Phoenix	10	9	1	329	166	+163	.900	Promotion to GFL
2	Albershausen Crusaders	10	6	4	271	178	+93	.600	
3	Gießen Golden Dragons	10	6	4	193	211	−18	.600	
4	Wiesbaden Phantoms	10	5	5	247	220	+27	.500	
5	Biberach Beavers	10	4	6	262	287	−25	.400	
6	Nürnberg Rams	10	4	6	206	321	−115	.400	
7	Fursty Razorbacks	10	3	7	111	209	−98	.300	
8	Montabaur Fighting Farmers	10	3	7	207	234	−27	.300	Relegation to Regionalliga

Source: gfl.info, football-aktuell.de
Rules for classification: 1) Winning percentage, 2) Head-to-head results

After the season had ended, the Fursty Razorbacks, a few weeks later, the Nürnberg Rams announced their withdrawal from the following season. As a result, the Montabaur Fighting Farmers remained in the league.

== Postseason ==
=== Relegation and Promotion round ===
Division	GFL Team	GFL2 Team	1st leg	2nd leg	Total
North	Paderborn Dolphins	Hamburg Pioneers	38–14	27–28	65–42

Since the Kirchdorf Wildcats withdrew from the GFL South, the Regensburg Phoenix got promoted directly.

=== Playoffs ===
Quarterfinals
N1	Potsdam Royals	42
S4	Schwäbisch Hall Unicorns	25
S2	Munich Cowboys	44
N3	Berlin Rebels	31
S1	Ravensburg Razorbacks	42
N4	Kiel Baltic Hurricanes	22
N2	Dresden Monarchs	41
S3	Pforzheim Wilddogs	22

Semifinals
Potsdam Royals	74
Munich Cowboys	6
Ravensburg Razorbacks	24
Dresden Monarchs	31

GFL Bowl
Potsdam Royals	33
Dresden Monarchs	23
