= Ravensburg Razorbacks =

American football team in Germany

- Founded: 1987
- League: German Football League
- Based in: Ravensburg
- Stadium: Lindenhofstadion
- Colors: White and Blue
- President: Thomas Prüß (TSB Ravensburg)
- Head coach: John Gilligan
- Website: ifm-razorbacks.de

The Ravensburg Razorbacks are an American football team in Ravensburg Germany. As its greatest success, the club won the South Division of the German Football League in 2025. The Razorbacks are member of the GFL, the highest level in Germany, since 2020 by having won the promotion play-off against Kirchdorf Wildcats in the postseason 2019.

== History ==
=== 1987 - 2009 ===
The Razorbacks trace their roots to the Lindenberg Razorbacks, which were founded in 1986. In October 1987, the team moved to Ravensburg, a move commonly treated as the beginning of the Ravensburg Razorbacks, and became an independent department of TSB Ravensburg. The team entered league play in 1988 in the Aufbauliga Baden-Württemberg, then the lowest level of the German league system. After several stronger seasons in the 1990s, the club was relegated from the Oberliga Baden-Württemberg in 1996 and entered a rebuilding period. A major turning point came in 1999, when several players from the Konstanz 89’ers joined Ravensburg after Konstanz withdrew from competition because of player shortages; the Razorbacks finished as Oberliga Baden-Württemberg runners-up the following year. After another downturn in 2005 and 2006, Ravensburg was relegated to the Verbandsliga Baden-Württemberg and formed a playing partnership with the Zollernalb Patriots from Albstadt. Competing together under the Ravensburg Razorbacks name, the team achieved immediate promotion back to the Oberliga with a perfect season in 2007, consolidated itself at that level in 2008, and won promotion to the Regionalliga Mitte in 2009.

=== 2009 - 2020 ===
In 2009, the Razorbacks won the Regionalliga Mitte and were promoted to the German Football League 2. After returning to the Regionalliga in 2015, they repeated their success and played in the 2016 season again in the GFL2. This time the rise of the team continued. After finishing 5th and 2nd they won the division title of the GFL2 South in 2018. In the subsequent play-offs the Razorbacks fell short of being promoted to the GFL against the Stuttgart Scorpions. One year later the entered again the promotion round as division winners. This time they won twice against the Kirchdorf Wildcats and thus, are qualified to compete in the German Football League in the 2020 season.

=== 2020 - Present ===
After promotion to the German Football League, the Razorbacks’ first top-flight season was delayed when the 2020 GFL season was cancelled because of the COVID-19 pandemic. The club finally made its GFL debut in 2021 and spent its first years establishing itself in the South Division. After a difficult 2023 season, John Gilligan returned as head coach ahead of the 2024 season, marking a reset for the club after the previous year. Under Gilligan, the Razorbacks quickly improved, qualifying for the playoffs in 2024 and hosting the New Yorker Lions in the club’s first GFL quarterfinal appearance. The progress continued in 2025, when Ravensburg won the GFL South for the first time in club history, ending Schwäbisch Hall Unicorns’ long run as the dominant team in the division. The Razorbacks then won their first GFL playoff game and reached the semifinals for the first time, making 2025 the most successful season in club history.

== Honours ==
- GFL
  - Southern Division champions: 2025
  - Play-off qualification: 2024, 2025, 2026
  - League membership: (7) 2020–present
- GFL2
  - Southern Division champions: 2018, 2019

== Recent seasons ==
Year	Division	Finish	Points	Pct.	Games	W	D	L	PF	PA	Postseason
2017	GFL2 (South)	2nd	17–7	0.708	12	8	1	3	422	375	—
2018	GFL2 (South)	1st	23–5	0.821	14	11	1	2	661	414	Lost PR: Stuttgart Scorpions (34–72 & 6–48)
2019	GFL2 (South)	1st	20–4	0.833	12	10	0	2	433	244	Won PR: Kirchdorf Wildcats (40–28 & 58–34)
2020	GFL (South)	No season played because of the COVID-19 pandemic									
2021	GFL (South)	5th	10–10	0.500	10	5	0	5	281	298	—
2022	GFL (South)	7th	3–17	0.150	10	1	1	8	270	402	—
2023	GFL (South)	8th	4–20	0.167	12	2	–	10	209	375	RR: withdrew against Kirchdorf Wildcats (Note: Although they had been relegated by not playing the playoffs, the Razorbacks remained in the GFL after the withdrawal of the Marburg Mercenaries.)
2024	GFL (South)	2nd	14–10	0.500	12	7	–	5	351	315	Lost QF: New Yorker Lions (14–45)
2025	GFL (South)	1st	16–8	0.667	12	8	–	4	432	350	Won QF: Kiel Baltic Hurricanes (42–22); Lost SF: Dresden Monarchs (24–31)
2026	GFL (South)	3rd	16–8	0.667	12	8	–	4	428	238	Lost QF: Potsdam Royals (21–48)

- PR = Promotion round
- RR = Relegation round
- QF = Quarter finals
- SF = Semi finals
