= 2022 German Football League =

- League: German Football League
- Sport: American football
- Duration: 21 May – 2 October
- Number of teams: 16
- Relegated to GFL2: Düsseldorf Panther, Frankfurt Universe

Regular season
- GFL North champions: Potsdam Royals (1)
- GFL South champions: Schwäbisch Hall Unicorns (12)

German Bowl XLIII
- Champions: Schwäbisch Hall Unicorns (5)
- Runners-up: Potsdam Royals
- Finals MVP: Reilly Hennessey

GFL seasons
- ← 2021 2023 →

The 2022 German Football League season is the 43rd edition of the top-level American football competition in Germany.

The regular season started on 21 May and ended on 28 August 2022, followed by the play-offs. The season culminated in the German Bowl XLIII, which was held on 2 October 2022 in Frankfurt, where the north champion Potsdam Royals met the south champion Schwäbisch Hall Unicorns. The Unicorns won their 5th German title with a 44–27 victory.

== Modus ==
Location of teams in the German Football League 2022

The league is divided in two conferences, north and south, and both conferences are divided in two divisions. During the regular season each club plays all other clubs in its division twice, home and away, and the teams of the other division of its conference once, resulting in each team playing 10 regular season games.

The best four teams in each conference qualify for the play-offs where, in the quarter-finals, teams from opposite conferences play each other, whereby the better placed teams have home field advantage. The first placed team plays the fourth placed from the other conference and the second placed the third placed team. From the semi-finals onwards teams from the same conference can meet again.

The eighth placed team in the southern conference enters a two-leg play-off with the winner of the respective conference of the German Football League 2, the second tier of the league system in Germany. The winner of this contest qualifies for the GFL for the following season.

== League tables ==
=== GFL ===
The league tables of the two GFL divisions:

==== North ====
Pos	Team	Pld	W	D	L	PF	PA	PD	PCT	Qualification or relegation
1	Potsdam Royals	10	10	0	0	514	278	+236	1.000	Qualification to play-offs
2	New Yorker Lions	10	6	2	2	337	225	+112	.700	Qualification to play-offs
3	Cologne Crocodiles	10	7	0	3	386	243	+143	.700	Qualification to play-offs
4	Berlin Adler	10	6	0	4	326	318	+8	.600	Qualification to play-offs
5	Dresden Monarchs	10	4	0	6	265	257	+8	.400	
6	Berlin Rebels	10	3	1	6	348	371	−23	.350	
7	Kiel Baltic Hurricanes	10	2	1	7	179	311	−132	.250	
8	Düsseldorf Panther	10	0	0	10	67	419	−352	.000	Relegation play-offs to GFL2

Source: GFL.info, football-aktuell.de

==== South ====
Pos	Team	Pld	W	D	L	PF	PA	PD	PCT	Qualification or relegation
1	Schwäbisch Hall Unicorns	10	10	0	0	437	148	+289	1.000	Qualification to play-offs
2	Munich Cowboys	10	8	1	1	303	176	+127	.850	Qualification to play-offs
3	Allgäu Comets	10	6	0	4	391	291	+100	.600	Qualification to play-offs
4	Straubing Spiders	10	6	0	4	339	307	+32	.600	Qualification to play-offs
5	Saarland Hurricanes	10	4	0	6	348	302	+46	.400	
6	Marburg Mercenaries	10	4	0	6	225	255	−30	.400	
7	Ravensburg Razorbacks	10	1	1	8	270	402	−132	.150	
8	Frankfurt Universe	10	0	0	10	124	556	−432	.000	Relegation play-offs to GFL2

Source: GFL.info, football-aktuell.de

=== GFL2 ===
The league tables of the two GFL2 divisions:

==== North ====
Pos	Team	Pld	W	D	L	PF	PA	PD	PCT	Qualification or relegation
1	Paderborn Dolphins	10	8	0	2	234	144	+90	.800	Qualification to promotion play-off
2	Langenfeld Longhorns	10	8	0	2	349	185	+164	.800	
3	Hildesheim Invaders	10	7	0	3	396	267	+129	.700	
4	Lübeck Cougars	10	7	0	3	292	254	+38	.700	
5	Rostock Griffins	10	4	0	6	264	232	+32	.400	
6	Solingen Paladins	10	3	0	7	235	292	−57	.300	
7	Assindia Cardinals	10	3	0	7	177	259	−82	.300	Relegation to Regionalliga
8	Hamburg Huskies	10	0	0	10	153	467	−314	.000	Relegation to Regionalliga

Source: football-aktuell.de, gfl.info
Rules for classification: 1) Winning percentage, 2) Head-to-head results

==== South ====
Pos	Team	Pld	W	D	L	PF	PA	PD	PCT	Qualification or relegation
1	Ingolstadt Dukes	10	10	0	0	445	147	+298	1.000	Qualification to promotion play-off
2	Kirchdorf Wildcats	10	8	0	2	346	116	+230	.800	
3	Bad Homburg Sentinels	10	7	0	3	279	184	+95	.700	
4	Gießen Golden Dragons	10	6	0	4	341	222	+119	.600	
5	Fursty Razorbacks	10	5	0	5	263	145	+118	.500	
6	Stuttgart Scorpions	10	3	0	7	136	261	−125	.300	
7	Wiesbaden Phantoms	10	1	0	9	177	407	−230	.100	Relegation to Regionalliga
8	Frankfurt Pirates	10	0	0	10	70	575	−505	.000	Relegation to Regionalliga

Source: football-aktuell.de, gfl.info
Rules for classification: 1) Winning percentage, 2) Head-to-head results

== Postseason ==
=== Relegation and Promotion round ===
Division	GFL Team	GFL2 Team	1st leg	2nd leg	Total
North	Düsseldorf Panther	Paderborn Dolphins	7–13	13–8	20–21

In the Southern Division the Frankfurt Universe withdrew from playing the relegation game against Ingolstadt Dukes.

=== Playoffs ===
Quarterfinals
N1	Potsdam Royals	66
S4	Straubing Spiders	25
S2	Munich Cowboys	31
N3	Cologne Crocodiles	34
S1	Schwäbisch Hall Unicorns	35
N4	Berlin Adler	21
N2	New Yorker Lions	10
S3	Allgäu Comets	14

Semifinals
N1	Potsdam Royals	49
N3	Cologne Crocodiles	21
S1	Schwäbisch Hall Unicorns	33
S3	Allgäu Comets	8

German Bowl XLIII
N1	Potsdam Royals	27
S1	Schwäbisch Hall Unicorns	44
