= 2021 German Football League =

- League: German Football League
- Sport: American football
- Duration: 5 June – 9 October
- Teams: 14
- Relegated to GFL2: Stuttgart Scorpions

Regular season
- GFL North champions: Dresden Monarchs (1)
- GFL South champions: Schwäbisch Hall Unicorns (11)

German Bowl XLII
- Champions: Dresden Monarchs
- Runners-up: Schwäbisch Hall Unicorns
- Finals MVP: Kyle James Carta-Samuels

GFL seasons
- ← 2020 2022 →

The 2021 German Football League season was the 42nd edition of the top-level American football competition in Germany. It was the first season after the 2020 season had to be cancelled due to COVID-19.

The regular season started on 5 June and ended on 5 September 2021, followed by the play-offs. Due to the coronavirus pandemic, the start of the season was more than one month later than in other years. The COVID-19 pandemic as well as the European League of Football "raiding" the GFL for coaches, players and even entire teams led to the withdrawal of the Hildesheim Invaders, the Elmshorn Fighting Pirates (both GFL North) and the Ingolstadt Dukes (GFL South) before the season began. While the vacancy in the South was filled with the Saarland Hurricanes, the Northern division played with six instead of the normal eight teams. To reduce the strain on teams and the risk of infection, the AFVD decided to further subdivide each division into two groups, with only the teams within a group playing the full home and away schedule against each other and members of different groups only meeting once for a schedule of 10 games, but due to the Northern division being composed of only six teams, this had practical effects only in the South. The Braunschweig Lions started later into the season because Covid restrictions in Lower Saxony hadn't allowed them adequate time to prepare and even then their first home game was held in front of empty ranks. The season concluded with German Bowl XLII, which was held on 9 October 2021 in Frankfurt.

== Modus ==
Location of teams in the German Football League 2021

The league is divided in two conferences, north and south, and both conferences are divided in two divisions. During the regular season each club plays all other clubs in its division twice, home and away, and the teams of the other division of its conference once, resulting in each team playing 10 regular season games. In the northern conferences, there are only six teams this year. Hence, each team plays the clubs of the other division twice, which results again in 10 games.

The best four teams in each conference qualify for the play-offs where, in the quarter-finals, teams from opposite conferences play each other, whereby the better placed teams have home field advantage. The first placed team plays the fourth placed from the other conference and the second placed the third placed team. From the semi-finals onwards teams from the same conference can meet again.

The eighth placed team in the southern conference enters a two-leg play-off with the winner of the respective conference of the German Football League 2, the second tier of the league system in Germany. The winner of this contest qualifies for the GFL for the following season.

== Season overview ==
Given that the upstart European League of Football took virtually all their non-American players for the Stuttgart Surge and Frankfurt Galaxy from the Stuttgart Scorpions and Frankfurt Universe respectively, it was clear early on that relegation in the South would be fought between those two teams. While the Cologne Centurions did similar things to the Cologne Crocodiles, a sufficient number of high caliber players remained with the Crocos to allow them to remain competitive, even dealing the Dresden Monarchs an upset defeat in their season opener in Cologne. While Braunschweig surprised many with their relatively lackluster on-field performance, they still made it into the playoffs at 5–5 in fourth place which however meant they had to go on the road to Schwäbisch Hall who dominated the GFL South in even stronger fashion than before the pandemic as their only serious intra-division adversary from previous seasons, Frankfurt Universe could only field a rump team of local youth players after most of their starting line-up from 2019 jumped ship for the ELF. A surprisingly strong showing by the Saarland Hurricanes, who had only been added to the GFL South for that season to fill the spot left open by the withdrawal of the Ingolstadt Dukes saw the 'canes place second in the South. In the North their Baltic namesakes had yet another season of committed mediocrity with only occasional moments showing the top team they had been a few years prior. Like Hildesheim and Elmshorn who withdrew ahead of the season, Kiel also suffered from the proximity of the Hamburg Sea Devils as many players in the Northern German region had commuted between Hildesheim, Kiel, Hamburg, Lübeck and other GFL cities in previous years depending on where they would find the most favorable playing conditions – most of that talent pool had been scooped up by the ELF for 2021. Dresden ultimately won the remaining nine regular season games after their loss in Cologne, placing ahead of Potsdam who let the theoretical chance to win a division title (if they had beaten Dresden at Heinz Steyer Stadion by 16 or more points in their last regular season game, they would've won the head-to-head breaking the hypothetical 8–2 tie in win-loss record) pass by mostly playing their backups in their lopsided 63–7 loss. In the South the Munich Cowboys and the Allgäu Comets filled the remaining playoff spots behind Hall and Saarland.

=== GFL2 ===
Just before the season started the Biberach Beavers withdrew, thus, the number of teams in the south division was reduced to six.

== League tables ==
=== GFL ===
The league tables of the two GFL divisions:

==== North ====
Pos	Team	Pld	W	D	L	PF	PA	PD	PCT	Qualification or relegation
1	Dresden Monarchs	10	9	0	1	444	243	+201	.900	Qualification to play-offs
2	Potsdam Royals	10	7	0	3	312	191	+121	.700	Qualification to play-offs
3	Cologne Crocodiles	10	6	0	4	319	278	+41	.600	Qualification to play-offs
4	New Yorker Lions	10	5	0	5	288	260	+28	.500	Qualification to play-offs
5	Kiel Baltic Hurricanes	10	2	0	8	217	429	−212	.200	
6	Berlin Rebels	10	1	0	9	118	297	−179	.100	

Source: stats.gfl.info, football-aktuell.de

==== South ====
Pos	Team	Pld	W	D	L	PF	PA	PD	PCT	Qualification or relegation
1	Schwäbisch Hall Unicorns	10	10	0	0	512	90	+422	1.000	Qualification to play-offs
2	Saarland Hurricanes	10	8	0	2	332	147	+185	.800	Qualification to play-offs
3	Munich Cowboys	10	6	0	4	289	118	+171	.600	Qualification to play-offs
4	Allgäu Comets	10	6	0	4	270	162	+108	.600	Qualification to play-offs
5	Ravensburg Razorbacks	10	5	0	5	281	298	−17	.500	
6	Marburg Mercenaries	10	2	0	8	189	350	−161	.200	
7	Frankfurt Universe	10	2	0	8	117	496	−379	.200	
8	Stuttgart Scorpions	10	1	0	9	128	457	−329	.100	Relegation play-offs to GFL2

Updated to match(es) played on 11 September 2021. Source: stats.gfl.info, football-aktuell.de

=== GFL2 ===
The league tables of the two GFL2 divisions:

==== North ====
Pos	Team	Pld	W	D	L	PF	PA	PD	PCT	Qualification or relegation
1	Berlin Adler	9	8	1	0	409	171	+238	.944	Qualification to GFL
2	Düsseldorf Panther	10	8	1	1	239	174	+65	.850	Qualification to GFL
3	Langenfeld Longhorns	10	7	0	3	313	238	+75	.700	
4	Rostock Griffins	10	6	1	3	287	176	+111	.650	
5	Solingen Paladins	10	4	0	6	150	216	−66	.400	
6	Lübeck Cougars	10	2	1	7	196	266	−70	.250	
7	Hamburg Huskies	9	1	0	8	111	309	−198	.111	
8	Assindia Cardinals	10	1	0	9	147	302	−155	.100	

Updated to match(es) played on 19 September 2021. Source: GFL.info, football-aktuell
Rules for classification: 1) Winning percentage, 2) Head-to-head results

==== South ====
Pos	Team	Pld	W	D	L	PF	PA	PD	PCT	Qualification or relegation
1	Straubing Spiders	8	8	0	0	334	121	+213	1.000	Qualification to promotion play-off
2	Fursty Razorbacks	7	4	1	2	269	140	+129	.643	
3	Kirchdorf Wildcats	8	5	0	3	227	153	+74	.625	
4	Bad Homburg Sentinels	9	4	1	4	170	163	+7	.500	
5	Wiesbaden Phantoms	8	1	1	6	72	216	−144	.188	
6	Frankfurt Pirates	8	0	1	7	30	309	−279	.063	

Updated to match(es) played on 11 September 2021. Source: GFL.info, football-aktuell
Rules for classification: 1) Winning percentage, 2) Head-to-head results

== Relegation and Promotion round ==
Due to the Stuttgart Scorpions refraining from playing a promotion/relegation round, the champion of the 2021 GFL2 South, Straubing Spiders is qualified for the 2022 German Football League by walkover. The GFL North having played with only six teams in 2021 (instead of the usual eight teams) will not have any team relegated this year. The Berlin Adler having won the 2021 GFL2 North are qualified for the 2022 German Football League as well. Whether the eighth spot in the GFL will be filled ahead of the 2022 season and if so, how, will be determined and announced at a later date.

== Play-offs ==
Quarterfinals
N1	Dresden Monarchs	50
S4	Allgäu Comets	13
S2	Saarland Hurricanes	35
N3	Cologne Crocodiles	16
S1	Schwäbisch Hall Unicorns	38
N4	New Yorker Lions	13
N2	Potsdam Royals	36
S3	Munich Cowboys	23

Semifinals
N1	Dresden Monarchs	37
S2	Saarland Hurricanes	0
S1	Schwäbisch Hall Unicorns	28
N2	Potsdam Royals	18

German Bowl
N1	Dresden Monarchs	28
S1	Schwäbisch Hall Unicorns	19
