= 2019 German Football League =

- League: German Football League
- Sport: American football
- Duration: 27 April–12 October 2019
- Number of teams: 16
- Promoted to GFL: Elmshorn Fighting Pirates, Ravensburg Razorbacks
- Relegated to GFL2: Düsseldorf Panther, Kirchdorf Wildcats

Regular season
- GFL North champions: New Yorker Lions (15)
- GFL South champions: Schwäbisch Hall Unicorns (10)

German Bowl XLI
- Champions: New Yorker Lions (12)
- Runners-up: Schwäbisch Hall Unicorns

GFL seasons
- ← 2018 2020 →

The 2019 German Football League season is the 41st edition of the top-level American football competition in Germany.

The regular season starts on 27 April and will be finished on 8 September 2019, followed by the play-offs. The season culminated in the German Bowl XLI, which will be held on 12 October 2019 in Frankfurt.

== Modus ==
Location of teams in the German Football League 2019

During the regular season each club plays all other clubs in its division twice, home and away, resulting in each team playing 14 regular season games. There are no games between clubs from opposite divisions, interconference games having been abolished after the 2011 season.

The best four teams in each division qualify for the play-offs where, in the quarter-finals, teams from opposite divisions play each other, whereby the better placed teams have home field advantage. The first placed team plays the fourth placed from the other division and the second placed the third placed team. From the semi-finals onwards teams from the same division can meet again.

The eighth placed team in each division enter a two-leg play-off with the winner of the respective division of the German Football League 2, the second tier of the league system in Germany. The winners of this contest qualify for the GFL for the following season.

== League tables ==
=== GFL ===
The league tables of the two GFL divisions:

==== North ====
Pos	Team	Pld	W	D	L	PF	PA	PD	PCT	Qualification or relegation
1	New Yorker Lions	14	14	0	0	586	179	+407	1.000	Qualification to play-offs
2	Dresden Monarchs	14	10	0	4	418	189	+229	.714	Qualification to play-offs
3	Hildesheim Invaders	14	10	0	4	413	305	+108	.714	Qualification to play-offs
4	Berlin Rebels	14	8	0	6	387	302	+85	.571	Qualification to play-offs
5	Cologne Crocodiles	14	7	0	7	251	314	−63	.500	
6	Potsdam Royals	14	4	1	9	243	360	−117	.321	
7	Kiel Baltic Hurricanes	14	2	1	11	210	425	−215	.179	
8	Düsseldorf Panther	14	0	0	14	185	619	−434	.000	Relegation play-offs to GFL2

Source: GFL.info, football-aktuell.de

==== South ====
Pos	Team	Pld	W	D	L	PF	PA	PD	PCT	Qualification or relegation
1	Schwäbisch Hall Unicorns	14	14	0	0	680	176	+504	1.000	Qualification to play-offs
2	Frankfurt Universe	14	11	0	3	478	252	+226	.786	Qualification to play-offs
3	Marburg Mercenaries	14	9	0	5	493	378	+115	.643	Qualification to play-offs
4	Stuttgart Scorpions	14	6	0	8	328	473	−145	.429	Qualification to play-offs
5	Ingolstadt Dukes	14	5	0	9	298	433	−135	.357	
6	Allgäu Comets	14	5	0	9	263	406	−143	.357	
7	Munich Cowboys	14	3	1	10	238	423	−185	.250	
8	Kirchdorf Wildcats	14	2	1	11	276	513	−237	.179	Relegation play-offs to GFL2

Source: GFL.info, football-aktuell.de

=== GFL2 ===
The league tables of the two GFL2 divisions:

==== North ====
Pos	Team	Pld	W	D	L	PF	PA	PD	PCT	Qualification or relegation
1	Elmshorn Fighting Pirates	14	12	0	2	561	279	+282	.857	Qualification to promotion play-off
2	Lübeck Cougars	14	10	0	4	418	337	+81	.714	
3	Rostock Griffins	14	8	0	6	456	353	+103	.571	
4	Solingen Paladins	14	8	0	6	370	386	−16	.571	
5	Langenfeld Longhorns	14	8	0	6	481	414	+67	.571	
6	Hamburg Huskies	14	7	0	7	399	340	+59	.500	
7	Hannover Spartans	14	2	0	12	250	515	−265	.143	Relegation to Regionalliga
8	Troisdorf Jets	14	1	0	13	203	514	−311	.071	Relegation to Regionalliga

Source: Football-aktuell, GFL.info
Rules for classification: 1) Winning percentage, 2) Head-to-head results

==== South ====
Pos	Team	Pld	W	D	L	PF	PA	PD	PCT	Qualification or relegation
1	Ravensburg Razorbacks	12	10	0	2	433	244	+189	.833	Qualification to promotion play-off
2	Saarland Hurricanes	12	9	0	3	501	183	+318	.750	
3	Straubing Spiders	12	9	0	3	431	182	+249	.750	
4	Biberach Beavers	12	6	0	6	288	385	−97	.500	
5	Wiesbaden Phantoms	12	5	0	7	301	304	−3	.417	
6	Darmstadt Diamonds	12	3	0	9	176	420	−244	.250	
7	Gießen Golden Dragons	12	0	0	12	62	474	−412	.000	Relegation to Regionalliga

Source: Football-aktuell, GFL.info
Rules for classification: 1) Winning percentage, 2) Head-to-head results

== Relegation and Promotion round ==
Division	GFL Team	GFL2 Team	1st leg	2nd leg	Total
North	Düsseldorf Panther	Elmshorn Fighting Pirates	14–47	21–34	35–81
South	Kirchdorf Wildcats	Ravensburg Razorbacks	28–40	34–58	62–98

== Play-offs ==
This year all play-off games were won by the home teams and the Dresden Monarchs found their match in the Schwäbisch Hall Unicorns for the fourth time in five years (losing their semifinals to them in 2014, 2015, 2016 and 2018). This losing streak would only end in German Bowl XLII which again saw Schwäbisch Hall face the Monarchs, but this time the Saxonians prevailed. Avenging the previous year's semifinal defeat against Frankfurt, Braunschweig once again reached the German Bowl, which would be played in Frankfurt's Waldstadion this year. In a low scoring affair, Braunschweig snapped a fifty-game winning streak of Schwäbisch Hall that had started in 2017 and won their twelfth national championship by a final score of 10–7 in German Bowl XLI.

Quarterfinals
N1	New Yorker Lions	70
S4	Stuttgart Scorpions	3
S2	Frankfurt Universe	28
N3	Hildesheim Invaders	7
S1	Schwäbisch Hall Unicorns	45
N4	Berlin Rebels	24
N2	Dresden Monarchs	39
S3	Marburg Mercenaries	22

Semifinals
New Yorker Lions	36
Frankfurt Universe	18
Schwäbisch Hall Unicorns	30
Dresden Monarchs	13

German Bowl
New Yorker Lions	10
Schwäbisch Hall Unicorns	7
