= Hildesheim Invaders =

- Founded: 1983
- League: German Football League
- Based in: Hildesheim
- Arena: Helios Homefield
- Colors: Blue and Yellow
- Owner: Hildesheim Invaders e.V.
- Head coach: Marcus Herford
- Championships: GFL2 Champion 2023
- Cheerleaders: Roses
- Website: goinvaders.de

The Hildesheim Invaders are an American football team founded in 1983 from Hildesheim, Germany.

The club's greatest success has been promotion to the American football Bundesliga, now the German Football League in 2023, the highest level league, in 1989 where it played for two seasons until 1991. A division title in the German Football League 2 in 2015 earned the club the right to return to the highest level of play in Germany, should it meet the licensing requirements, which they did.

The team currently as of 2024 plays again in the GFL Nord.

== History ==
Formed in 1983 the Invaders entered the northern division of tier two 2. Bundesliga from 1986. The club won division championships at this level in 1986 and 1989 with the latter earning it promotion to the American football Bundesliga. Hildesheim played for two seasons at this level, coming fourth in its division in 1990 but finishing last the year after, losing all ten season games. From 1992 to 1994 and, again, from 1996 to 2000 the team played in the 2. Bundesliga again, dropping down to the Regionalliga for a season in 1995.

The end of the 2000 season saw the club relegated and stepping down to the tier four Oberliga for a season. Between 2001 and 2006 the Invaders fluctuated between the third and fourth tier of the league system. From 2006 onwards the fortunes of the club improved again, earning promotion to the Regionalliga that year, followed by promotion back to the 2. Bundesliga in 2008. From 2008 to 2014 the club fluctuated between the Regionalliga and the 2. Bundesliga, with the latter now renamed to German Football League 2. Promotion from the Regionalliga in 2008, 2011 and 2013 was followed by relegation from the second tier in 2009 and 2012. The Invaders were able to establish themselves in the GFL2 in 2014 and won the northern division in 2015, thereby earning the right to compete in the German Football League in 2016, taking up a spot made vacant by the withdrawal of the Cologne Falcons before the start of the 2015 season. The mother club of the team, Eintracht Hildesheim, decided in October 2015 to apply for a GFL licence, which was successful

== Honours ==
- GFL
  - Play-off qualification: (3) 2019, 2024, 2026
  - League membership: (9) 1990–1991, 2016–2019, 2024–2026
- GFL2
  - Northern Division champions: (4) 1986, 1989, 2015, 2023

== Recent seasons ==
Recent seasons of the club:

Year	Division	Finish	Points	Pct.	Games	W	D	L	PF	PA	Postseason
2012	GFL2 (North)	7th	5–23	0.179	14	2	1	11	222	347	—
2013	Regionalliga Nord	1st	23–1	0.958	12	11	1	0	473	93	—
2014	GFL2 (North)	5th	13–15	0.464	14	6	1	7	451	469	—
2015	GFL2 (North)	1st	21–7	0.750	14	10	1	3	573	401	—
2016	GFL (North)	5th	10–18	0.357	14	5	0	9	445	569	—
2017	GFL (North)	7th	6–22	0.214	14	3	0	11	253	475	—
2018	GFL (North)	7th	8–24	0.286	14	4	0	10	145	446	—
2019	GFL (North)	3rd	20–8	0.714	14	10	0	4	413	305	Lost QF: Frankfurt Universe (7–28)
2020	GFL (North)	No season played because of the COVID-19 pandemic									
2021	Regionalliga Nord	1st	10–0	1.000	5	5	0	0	226	46	Lost PR: Paderborn Dolphins (0–32) Won PR: Spandau Bulldogs (34–7)
2022	GFL2 (North)	3rd	14–6	0.700	10	7	0	3	396	267	—
2023	GFL2 (North)	1st	20–0	1.000	10	10	–	0	523	227	—
2024	GFL (North)	4th	14–10	0.583	12	7	–	5	398	357	Won QF @ Schwäbisch Hall Unicorns (31–28) Lost SF @ Dresden Monarchs (13–27)
2025	GFL (North)	7th	8–16	0.333	12	4	–	8	240	367	—
2026	GFL (North)	3rd	18–6	0.750	12	9	–	3	348	272	Lost QF @ Pforzheim Wilddogs (8–21)

- PR = Promotion round
- QF = Quarter finals
- SF = Semi finals
