= 2020 German Football League =

- League: German Football League
- Sport: American football
- Duration: 25 April – 6 September; Cancelled due to the COVID-19 pandemic
- Number of teams: 16

Regular season

GFL seasons
- ← 2019 2021 →

The 2020 German Football League season was the planned 42nd edition of the top-level American football competition in Germany.

The regular season was expected to start on 25 April and was expected to end on 6 September 2020, followed by the play-offs. Due to the coronavirus pandemic, the start of the season was first postponed, and later completely cancelled. The season was expected to conclude with German Bowl XLII, which was planned to be held on 10 October 2020 in Frankfurt. Instead German Bowl XLII was held on October 9, 2021 to end the 2021 German Football League season.

== Modus ==
Location of teams in the German Football League 2020

During the regular season each club plays all other clubs in its division twice, home and away, resulting in each team playing 14 regular season games.

The best four teams in each division qualify for the play-offs where, in the quarter-finals, teams from opposite divisions play each other, whereby the better placed teams have home field advantage. The first placed team plays the fourth placed from the other division and the second placed the third placed team. From the semi-finals onwards teams from the same division can meet again.

The eighth placed team in each division enter a two-leg play-off with the winner of the respective division of the German Football League 2, the second tier of the league system in Germany. The winners of this contest qualify for the GFL for the following season.

== League tables ==
=== GFL ===
The league tables of the two GFL divisions:

==== North ====
| Pos | Team | Pld | W | D | L | PF | PA | PD | PCT |
|---|---|---|---|---|---|---|---|---|---|
| 1 | New Yorker Lions | 0 | 0 | 0 | 0 | 0 | 0 | 0 | — |
| 2 | Dresden Monarchs | 0 | 0 | 0 | 0 | 0 | 0 | 0 | — |
| 3 | Hildesheim Invaders | 0 | 0 | 0 | 0 | 0 | 0 | 0 | — |
| 4 | Berlin Rebels | 0 | 0 | 0 | 0 | 0 | 0 | 0 | — |
| 5 | Cologne Crocodiles | 0 | 0 | 0 | 0 | 0 | 0 | 0 | — |
| 6 | Potsdam Royals | 0 | 0 | 0 | 0 | 0 | 0 | 0 | — |
| 7 | Kiel Baltic Hurricanes | 0 | 0 | 0 | 0 | 0 | 0 | 0 | — |
| 8 | Elmshorn Fighting Pirates | 0 | 0 | 0 | 0 | 0 | 0 | 0 | — |

Source: GFL.info, football-aktuell.de

==== South ====
| Pos | Team | Pld | W | D | L | PF | PA | PD | PCT |
|---|---|---|---|---|---|---|---|---|---|
| 1 | Schwäbisch Hall Unicorns | 0 | 0 | 0 | 0 | 0 | 0 | 0 | — |
| 2 | Frankfurt Universe | 0 | 0 | 0 | 0 | 0 | 0 | 0 | — |
| 3 | Marburg Mercenaries | 0 | 0 | 0 | 0 | 0 | 0 | 0 | — |
| 4 | Stuttgart Scorpions | 0 | 0 | 0 | 0 | 0 | 0 | 0 | — |
| 5 | Ingolstadt Dukes | 0 | 0 | 0 | 0 | 0 | 0 | 0 | — |
| 6 | Allgäu Comets | 0 | 0 | 0 | 0 | 0 | 0 | 0 | — |
| 7 | Munich Cowboys | 0 | 0 | 0 | 0 | 0 | 0 | 0 | — |
| 8 | Ravensburg Razorbacks | 0 | 0 | 0 | 0 | 0 | 0 | 0 | — |

Source: GFL.info, football-aktuell.de
