= Darrell Stewart Jr. =

American football player (born 1996)

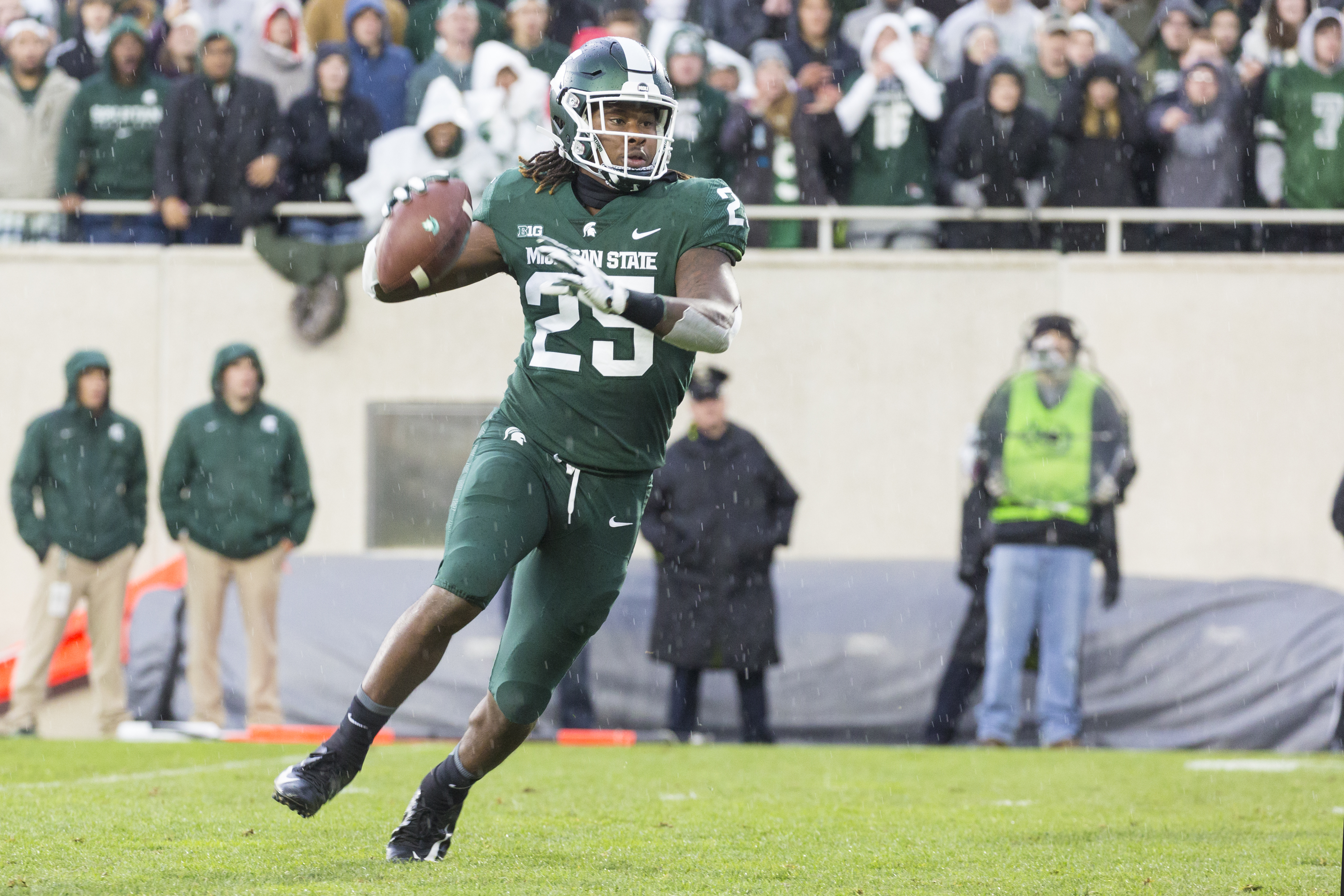
- Stewart with Michigan State in 2018

No. 8 – Vienna Vikings
- Position: Wide receiver

Personal information
- Born: July 14, 1996 (age 30); Houston, Texas, U.S.
- Listed height: 6 ft 0 in (1.83 m)
- Listed weight: 212 lb (96 kg)

Career information
- High school: Nimitz (Houston, Texas)
- College: Michigan State
- NFL draft: 2020: undrafted

Career history
- Green Bay Packers (2020)*; Carolina Panthers (2020)*; Dresden Monarchs (2021–2022); New Jersey Generals (2023); Stuttgart Surge (2023–2024); Panthers Wrocław (2025); Vienna Vikings (2026–present)
- * Offseason or practice squad member only

Awards and highlights
- German Bowl champion (XLII)
- Stats at Pro Football Reference

Darrell Stewart Jr. (born July 14, 1996) is an American football wide receiver for the Vienna Vikings in Austria. He played college football at Michigan State.

== Early life ==
During his career at Nimitz High School, Stewart had 20 receptions for 466 yards and 4 touchdowns.

== College career ==
After redshirting his first year at Michigan State in 2015, Stewart appeared in 10 games and made one start as a redshirt freshman, in which he recorded 3 receptions for 29 yards.

In his 2017 sophomore season, Stewart appeared in 13 games, in which he recorded 50 receptions for 501 yards and 2 touchdowns.

In his 2018 junior season, Stewart appeared in 11 games and made eight starts, and he missed two games due to injury. In those games, he recorded 48 receptions for 413 yards and 1 touchdown. He also won the team's Tommy Love Award for the most improved offensive player and the Doug Weaver "Oil Can" Award for the team humorist during this season.

In his 2019 senior season, Stewart appeared in 9 games and made eight starts, and he missed 4 games due to injury in November. In those games, he recorded 49 receptions for 697 yards and 4 touchdowns. He also won the team's Biggie Munn Award for most inspirational player on offense.

== Professional career ==
Pre-draft measurables
Height	Weight	Arm length	Hand span	Vertical jump	Broad jump	Bench press
6 ft 0 1/4 in (1.84 m)	212 lb (96 kg)	32 in (0.81 m)	9 5/8 in (0.24 m)	35.0 in (0.89 m)	9 ft 9 in (2.97 m)	15 reps
All values from NFL Combine

=== Green Bay Packers ===
Stewart went undrafted in the 2020 NFL draft. On April 29, 2020, Stewart was signed by the Green Bay Packers as an undrafted free agent. The Packers waived Stewart on August 15, 2020.

=== Carolina Panthers ===
Stewart had a tryout with the Carolina Panthers on August 23, 2020, and signed with the team three days later. He was waived on September 5, 2020.

=== Dresden Monarchs ===
Stewart signed with the Dresden Monarchs on May 8, 2021. He was the leading receiver in the German Football League amassing 1,369 yards, 82 catches, and 22 touchdowns during a historic German Bowl championship title run.

=== New Jersey Generals ===
Stewart signed with the New Jersey Generals of the United States Football League on September 17, 2022. He was placed on injured reserve on April 13, 2023, and transferred to the inactive roster on May 16. The Generals folded when the XFL and USFL merged to create the United Football League (UFL).

=== Vienna Vikings ===
Stewart signed a contract to play for the traditional power Vienna Vikings for the 2026 season.
