= German Bowl XLI =

2019 German Bowl
| Braunschweig Lions | Schwäbisch Hall Unicorns |
| (14–0) | (14–0) |
| GFL North | GFL South |
| 10 | 7 |
| Head coach: Troy Tomlin | Head coach: Jordan Neumann |
| | 1 | 2 | 3 | 4 | Total |
|---|---|---|---|---|---|
| Braunschweig | 0 | 0 | 10 | 0 | 10 |
| Schwäbisch Hall | 0 | 0 | 0 | 7 | 7 |
- Date: October 12, 2019
- Stadium: Waldstadion
- Location: Frankfurt am Main
- MVP: Christopher McClendon (Runningback, Braunschweig)
- National anthem: Nora Brandenburger
- Referee: Sauer
- Halftime show: Nora Brandenburger and 120 cheerleaders
- Attendance: 20,382

German Bowl XLI was the 41st annual championship game of the German Football League (GFL) pitting defending champion Schwäbisch Hall Unicorns against the record champion Braunschweig Lions. In the tied lowest scoring German Bowl in GFL history which remained scoreless at half time, Braunschweig prevailed 10–7 winning their record twelfth title in their eighteenth German Bowl appearance.

== Background ==
The game featured the division champions in the North and the South who had posted perfect regular season records of 14–0. For Schwäbisch Hall this was the eighth appearance in the final in their club history - all having come since 2011. Braunschweig meanwhile avenged their semifinal defeat from the previous season in this year's semifinal against Frankfurt Universe to return to the Championship Game after a one year absence. It was their sixth appearance that decade and eighteenth overall, the latter being a league record. Prior to the Bowl, Schwäbisch Hall had posted a 50 game winning streak in league games (playoffs and regular season) which coincided with the tenure of Head Coach Jordan Neuman who had taken over for Siegfried Gehrke after the 2016 season.

After Hall's Quarterback Marco Ehrenfried, who had led his team to championships in 2017 and 2018 and also led the German national team to the 2014 European Championship, retired from his role as starting Quarterback at the age of 27 to focus on his day job, the Unicorns hired Jadrian Clark as his replacement, who had played for Braunschweig the previous season. Braunschweig meanwhile decided to put Brandon Connette under Center who had played for the Dresden Monarchs in the 2016 German Football League, losing the semifinals to Schwäbisch Hall. Connette had played the previous two seasons with the Helsinki Roosters of the Vaahteraliiga (Maple League) winning the Maple Bowl both times.

== Road to the Bowl ==
While the quarterfinals were won by the home teams, as expected, the semifinals saw two rematches with not only advancement to the German Bowl but also considerable rivalry bragging rights on the line. Frankfurt Universe had upset the Lions in the previous season after the Lions had managed to narrowly knock them out in 2017's semifinal. Frankfurt and Braunschweig's GFL playoff head-to-head at 1–1, Braunschweig also had to prove the continued dominance of the North over the South beside their own ambitions. The Unicorns meanwhile hosted the Dresden Monarchs for the fifth semifinal in six years. Dresden had last managed to best Schwäbisch Hall in the playoffs in 2010 and the Saxonians were anxious to reverse their fortunes this time. However, in the end the home teams again had the better luck on their side and thus Braunschweig and Schwäbisch Hall would meet for the fifth German Bowl in six years. Frankfurt was also denied the rare treat of a Championship Game "at home" as the game would be held in Frankfurt am Main after a seven year stint at Berlin's Friedrich Ludwig Jahn Sportpark.

Quarterfinals
N1 | New Yorker Lions | 70
S4 | Stuttgart Scorpions | 3
S2 | Frankfurt Universe | 28
N3 | Hildesheim Invaders | 7
S1 | Schwäbisch Hall Unicorns | 45
N4 | Berlin Rebels | 24
N2 | Dresden Monarchs | 39
S3 | Marburg Mercenaries | 22

Semifinals
New Yorker Lions | 36
Frankfurt Universe | 18
Schwäbisch Hall Unicorns | 30
Dresden Monarchs | 13

German Bowl
New Yorker Lions | 10
Schwäbisch Hall Unicorns | 7

== Game summary ==
The game was incredibly defense heavy with the Schwäbisch Hall offense only achieving 4 net yards rushing and both teams combining for 9 punts and four field goal attempts – three of which missed.

The game remained scoreless at the half with Lions kicker Tobias Goebel missing a 49 yard Field Goal attempt late in the first quarter. In the second quarter both teams traded interceptions and punts before Goebel missed another Field Goal attempt to end the half – this time from 44 yards.

After the break Schwäbisch Hall produced a quick three and out before Braunschweig responded with the first points of the game when McClendon capped off a 5 play 39 yard drive with a ten yard rush to the endzone. Now down 7–0, Schwäbisch Hall only achieved one First Down in their next drive before turning the ball over back to Braunschweig. Connette now led his offense down the field before sputtering out with a fourth and two at the Unicorns 9-yard line and this time the ensuing Field Goal attempt from 28 yards split the uprights making it 10–0. Hall again failed to produce much of note offensively for the rest of the quarter and produced a turnover on downs early in the fourth quarter when Clark was sacked at fourth and two around mid field. Getting the ball back with 10:34 left to play, Braunschweig now chewed up clock and marched down the field before missing another Field Goal attempt from 39 yards, giving the Unicorns a last chance at scoring with 5:08 remaining on the clock. Finally more productive offensively the Unicorns now used passes to drive down the field, but time was running out and the truly long bomb would elude them. More time was lost when Clark failed to convert on goal to go downs at the 1 yard line with running attempts before finally finding Haas for the two yard touchdown pass. With only 1:43 remaining, Hall had to take their chances with an onside kick, but Braunschweig recovered the ball. While the Unicorns still had two timeouts left, Braunschweig converting on third and six with a 19 yard quarterback run after the Unicorns had used their remaining timeouts to stop the clock sealed their fate and made the final score 10–7.
