= K. J. Carta-Samuels =

American gridiron football player (born 1995)

No. 5
- Position: Quarterback

Personal information
- Born: July 12, 1995 (age 31); Saratoga, California, U.S.
- Listed height: 6 ft 2 in (1.88 m)
- Listed weight: 225 lb (102 kg)

Career information
- High school: Bellarmine
- College: Washington (2014–2017); Colorado State (2018)
- NFL draft: 2019: undrafted

Career history
- BC Lions (2019–2020)*; Dresden Monarchs (2021)
- * Offseason or practice squad member only

Awards and highlights
- German Bowl champion (XLII); German Bowl MVP (XLII)
- Stats at CFL.ca

Kyle James Carta-Samuels (born July 12, 1995) is an American former football quarterback. He played college football at Washington and Colorado State. He also played for the Dresden Monarchs of the German Football League (GFL).

== Early life ==
Carta-Samuels was born in Saratoga, California, and attended Bellarmine College Preparatory. As a junior, he completed 70-of-129 passes for 1,230 yards and 12 scores while rushing for 632 yards and 12 touchdowns. He led the team to an 11–2 record, making the championship of the playoffs. As a senior, he brought them to 8–4 and to the semifinals in the CIF Central Coast Section Open Division playoffs. Carta-Samuels was named All-West Catholic Athletic League on their first-team roster following the season, and was invited to the U.S. Army All-American Bowl. He was a four-star recruit and was the number 23 quarterback prospect in the country according to Scout.com.

== College career ==
=== University of Washington ===
Carta-Samuels announced his commitment to University of Washington in January 2014 after initially committing to Vanderbilt. He spent his freshman year as a redshirt, and did not see any playing time. He was named the team's 2014 scout squad MVP. He lost a training camp battle for the starting quarterback position, but made his college debut against Boise State in 2015. He played in a total of eight games in 2015, completing 10-of-24 passes for 124 yards.

As a sophomore in 2016, Carta-Samuels completed 9-of-13 pass attempts for 104 yards and three touchdowns. He appeared in nine total games, and also made a brief appearance in the 2017 Peach Bowl, in a 7–24 loss against Alabama. Against number 7 ranked Stanford, Carta-Samuels led a late scoring drive that contributed to Washington's victory. He appeared in eight games as a junior, throwing ten passes, with eight being completed, for 82 yards. He also caught a pass in their win over the Oregon State Beavers. He announced intentions to transfer in December 2017.

=== Colorado State University ===
Though he initially transferred to UCLA, Carta-Samuels changed to Colorado State University (CSU) in March 2018. He beat out Justice McCoy and Colin Hill in training camp to earn the CSU starting quarterback position. In the season opener against Hawaii, Carta-Samuels passed for 537 yards and five touchdowns in the loss. The 537 passing yards set the all-time school record, as no other player had even thrown for 500 yards previously. Against Colorado, he started the game by completing 7-of-8 pass attempts. A week later, in a win over Arkansas, Carta-Samuels completed 32-of-47 pass attempts, going for 389 yards and two touchdowns. He was benched by coach Mike Bobo in a loss versus FCS Illinois State, but regained the starting position for their game against San Jose State. He threw four touchdowns versus the San Jose State Spartans, marking the 14th time a CSU quarterback threw four in one game. He was again benched in favor of Colin Hill following the eighth game of the season. After Hill was injured in the season finale, Carta-Samuels came in and went 6-for-9 passing, with one touchdown in his final career collegiate game.

Carta-Samuels finished the 2018 season going 183-for-298 on pass attempts, throwing for 2,261 yards and 19 touchdowns. He also threw 9 interceptions. His longest completion of the season was on a 69-yard pass to Preston Williams against Hawaii in week one.

== Professional career ==
=== BC Lions ===
After going unselected in the 2019 NFL draft, Carta-Samuels was signed by the BC Lions of the Canadian Football League (CFL) in November 2019. The CFL cancelled its 2020 season, and Carta-Samuels was released.

=== Dresden Monarchs ===
In April 2021, Carta-Samuels was signed by the Dresden Monarchs of the German Football League (GFL). He led the team to their first ever league championship, being named German Bowl XLII MVP in a 28–19 victory over the Schwäbisch Hall Unicorns.

== Career statistics ==
=== GFL ===
Season	Team	Games			Passing								Rushing			
Season	Team	GP	GS	Record	Cmp	Att	Pct	Yds	Y/A	TD	Int	Rtg	Att	Yds	Avg	TD
2021	Dresden	13	13	12–1	284	431	65.9	4,038	9.4	54	8	182.2	35	–83	–2.4	1
Career		13	13	12–1	284	431	65.9	4,038	9.4	54	8	182.2	35	–83	–2.4	1

=== College ===
Season	Team	Games			Passing								Rushing			
Season	Team	GP	GS	Record	Cmp	Att	Pct	Yds	Y/A	TD	Int	Rtg	Att	Yds	Avg	TD
2014	Washington	0	0	—	Redshirted (redshirt)											
2015	Washington	8	1	0–1	10	24	41.7	124	5.2	0	1	76.7	9	–1	–0.1	1
2016	Washington	9	0	—	9	13	69.2	104	8.0	3	0	212.6	4	4	1.0	0
2017	Washington	8	0	—	8	10	80.0	82	8.2	0	0	148.9	2	–4	–2.0	0
2018	Colorado State	10	8	3–5	183	296	61.8	2,261	7.6	19	9	141.1	45	–14	–0.3	1
Career		35	9	3–6	210	343	61.2	2,751	7.5	22	10	139.5	60	–15	–0.3	2

== Personal life ==
His brother Austyn Carta-Samuels played quarterback for Vanderbilt and Wyoming. In the 2022 German Football League Austyn replaced his brother as the Dresden Monarchs starting Quarterback, but got injured in the first match of the season and was subsequently replaced. His father, James Samuels, played at Utah State, as did his uncle. His sister Gabby played volleyball for Colorado.
