= Raheem Wilson =

American gridiron football player (born 1993)

Stuttgart Surge
- Position: Defensive back
- CFL status: American

Personal information
- Born: October 30, 1993 (age 33); DeSoto, Texas, U.S.
- Listed height: 5 ft 11 in (1.80 m)
- Listed weight: 185 lb (84 kg)

Career information
- High school: DeSoto (TX)
- College: Southeastern Oklahoma State

Career history
- 2017–2018: Schwäbisch Hall Unicorns
- 2019–2022: Calgary Stampeders
- 2022–2023: Montreal Alouettes
- 2024–present: Stuttgart Surge

Awards and highlights
- Grey Cup champion (2023); 2× German Bowl champion (2017, 2018); Second-team All-American (2016); First-team All-GAC (2016)
- Stats at CFL.ca

Raheem Wilson (born October 30, 1993) is an American professional football defensive back for the Stuttgart Surge of the European League of Football (ELF). He played college football at Southeastern Oklahoma State. He has also been a member of the Schwäbisch Hall Unicorns, Calgary Stampeders, and Montreal Alouettes.

== Early life ==
Wilson played high school football at DeSoto High School in DeSoto, Texas, where he earned honorable mention all-district honors.

== College career ==
Wilson played college football at Southeastern Oklahoma State from 2013 to 2016. He redshirted in 2012.

Wilson played in 11 games, starting 10, in 2012, recording 36 tackles, four interceptions and 10 pass breakups. He appeared in 12 games, starting 11, in 2014, totaling 59 tackles, four interceptions, eight pass breakups, two fumble recoveries, and a blocked kick. He started 11 games in 2015, accumulating 39 tackles and five interceptions (two of which were returned for touchdowns), earning honorable mention All-Great American Conference (GAC) honors. Wilson started 11 games in 2016, recording 47 tackles, five interceptions and 19 pass breakups. He led NCAA Division II that year in passes defensed with 24 (interceptions plus breakups). He garnered first team All-GAC recognition in 2016 and was also named a second team All-American by NFCA and D2CCA.

== Professional career ==
Wilson played for the Schwäbisch Hall Unicorns of the German Football League from 2017 to 2018, helping the Unicorns win the German Bowl both years.

Wilson was signed by the Calgary Stampeders of the Canadian Football League (CFL) on April 17, 2019. He started all 18 games for the Stampeders in 2019, recording 36 tackles on defense, one special teams tackle, two interceptions and one forced fumble. The 2020 CFL season was cancelled due to the COVID-19 pandemic in Canada. He played in 14 games, all starts, in 2021, totaling 52 tackles on defense, one special teams tackle and one interception. Wilson appeared in six games, all starts, for the Stampeders in 2022, recording 19 tackles on defense. He was released on August 2, 2022.

Wilson was signed to the practice roster of the Montreal Alouettes of the CFL on August 15, 2022. He was promoted to the active roster on August 28, and placed on injured reserve on October 28, 2022. Overall, he played in seven games, all starts, for the Alouettes in 2022, totaling 20 tackles on defense. Wilson re-signed with the Alouettes on February 2, 2023. He was placed on injured reserve on May 14, 2023, activated from injured reserve on August 10, and placed on injured reserve again on September 8, 2023. He only dressed in four games in 2023, recording three tackles on defense and one special teams tackle. On November 19, 2023, the Alouettes won the 110th Grey Cup, defeating the Winnipeg Blue Bombers by a score of 28–24. Wilson was released on April 18, 2024.

Wilson signed with the Stuttgart Surge of the European League of Football (ELF) in June 2024.
