= German Bowl XLII =

2021 Sharkwater German Bowl
Dresden Monarchs	Schwäbisch Hall Unicorns
(9–1)	(10–0)
GFL North	GFL South
28	19
Head coach: Ulz Däuber	Head coach: Jordan Neumann
	1	2	3	4	Total
Dresden	7	0	10	11	28
Schwäbisch Hall	6	6	7	0	19
- Date: October 9, 2021
- Stadium: Waldstadion
- Location: Frankfurt am Main
- MVP: K. J. Carta-Samuels (QB, DM)
- National anthem: Viviana Grisafi & Landespolizeiorchester Hessen
- Referee: Nabinger
- Halftime show: Michael Schulte, cheerleaders
- Attendance: 14,378

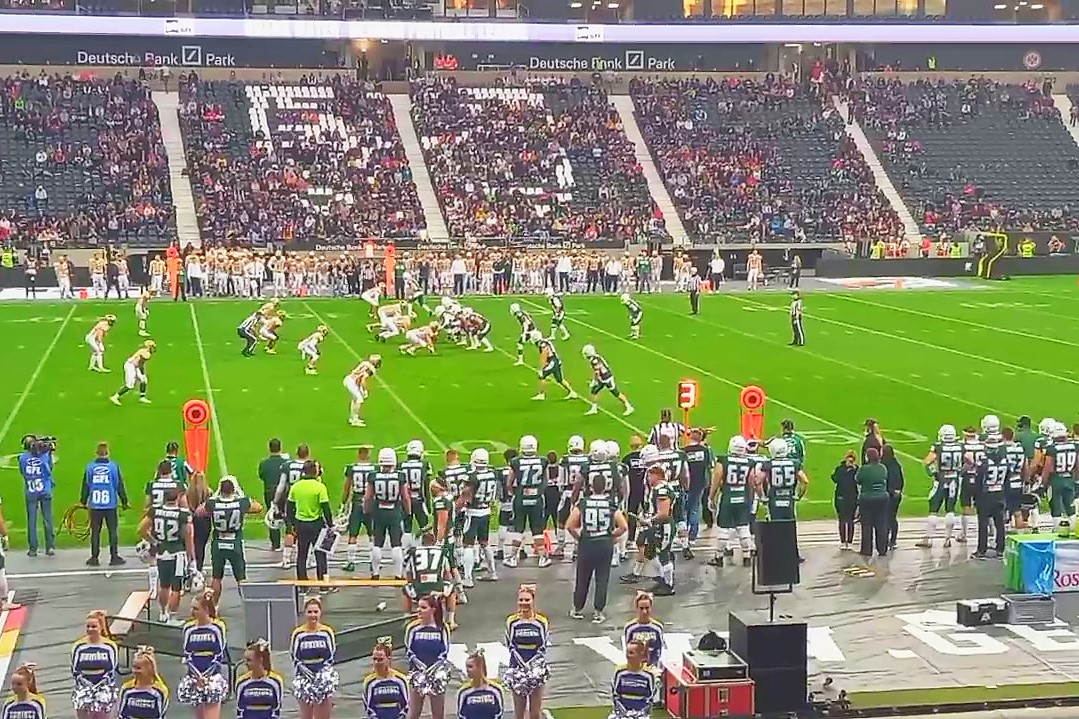
A game from the third quarter of the German Bowl 2021 on October 9th. The Schwäbisch Hall Unicorns offense against the Dresden Monarchs defense.

The 42nd annual German Bowl was the championship of the 2021 German Football League, originally planned for the 2020 German Football League which was cancelled due to the COVID-19 pandemic. The Dresden Monarchs beat the Schwäbisch Hall Unicorns 28–19 for their first ever title, bringing the German championship to a team from the New States of Germany for the first time. Defending champion Braunschweig Lions had been eliminated in the quarter-finals by Schwäbisch Hall.

== Background ==
As the 2020 season had to be cancelled due to COVID-19, the 2021 German Football League season would be the first in the "post pandemic" era and the 42nd overall since the foundation of the American Football Bundesliga in 1979. The Dresden Monarchs, member of the first tier GFL1 since the 2003 season won their first division title finishing atop a six team GFL North at 9–1 while the Schwäbisch Hall Unicorns continued their streak dating to 2011 of winning their eight team GFL South Division – this time with another perfect regular season of 10–0. The effects of COVID-19 and the entrance of the new European League of Football could be felt in the comparatively lackluster performance of defending champion Braunschweig Lions who finished 5–5 in the North, squeaking into the playoffs in fourth place and losing on the road to Hall in the quarter-finals. The fate of Frankfurt Universe, the opponent of Hall in German Bowl XL and semi-finalist in 2019 was even worse, as they dropped to 7th place in the South, narrowly avoiding relegation as much of their roster had left for the crosstown ELF team.

As the game was held at the same venue as the cancelled 2020 edition would have been, tickets bought for the 2020 edition remained valid for this game.

While Schwäbisch Hall made their ninth German Bowl appearance since 2011, Dresden had only reached the final once before – in 2013 when they lost to the Braunschweig Lions. Dresden represented the fourth different German Bowl opponent for the Unicorns who had gone 2–0 against the Kiel Baltic Hurricanes (2011&2012) 1–0 against Frankfurt Universe (2018) and 1–4 against Braunschweig (losing in 2014, 2015, 2016 & 2019 but defeating the Lions in 2017) in championship games. The Schwäbisch Hall Unicorns also won the first CEFL Bowl with German teams participating by beating the Tyrolean Raiders 22–16 on the road.

Being plagued by injuries in the semifinal, Schwäbisch Hall signed Reilly Hennessey an Italian-American who had won the Italian championship earlier that year as a backup to starting Quarterback Alexander Haupert.

The matchup besides showcasing the longstanding North-South disparity also featured two very different teams in philosophy and gameplay - Dresden led the league in offensive yards while Hall narrowly had the best scoring offense. The Unicorns had the best overall defense, the best pass defense and the best scoring defense (least points allowed). Dresden only placed sixth (out of 14) in scoring defense and even tenth in yards allowed per game defensively. In passing yards allowed per game they even placed second from last ahead of only Frankfurt Universe. Hall had a turnover differential of +17 leading the league while Dresden placed third at +9. Dresden meanwhile led the league in Field Goals made, Field Goal percentage and PAT percentage. Throughout the regular season Dresden only held their opponents to less than 15 points once - in their last game of the season against the Potsdam Royals who were largely playing with backups that game. Hall meanwhile posted four shutouts in the regular season, including one against Saarland Hurricanes whom the Monarchs would in turn shut out in the semifinal.

Both teams are notable for their strong emphasis on their own youth teams, for example Eric Seidel the backup Quarterback of Dresden had already been the backup to Quarterback Jeff Walsh in 2013 and had come from the youth teams of the Monarchs. Ulrich "Ulz" Däuber, the head coach of Dresden since 2017 had played with Schwäbisch Hall in his own playing days and been a member of their coaching staff before an extended stay in the USA. Jordan Neumann, head coach of the Schwäbisch Hall Unicorns meanwhile had played for Hall, too before becoming a coach and had been head coach since 2016 after Sigfried Gehrke resigned. The 2019 German Bowl represented Neumann's only defeat as head coach in the GFL prior to German Bowl XLII.

== Road to the Bowl ==
Dresden had little difficulty winning its home games in the playoffs, steamrolling both the fourth and the second from the GFL South by 37 points – even managing to shut out one of the surprise teams of the season, the Saarland Hurricanes, which had played in the second tier GFL2 in 2019, in the semifinal at home. The semifinal was also the last for Dresden at the "old" Heinz Steyer Stadion which is to shut down for renovations until 2023. Hall faced stronger opposition in 2019 champion Braunschweig who didn't play to their pre-Covid levels in their meetup at Hall's Optima Sportpark turning the ball over five times in their loss to Hall. The semifinal proved similarly doable for Hall as they overcame the Potsdam Royals but lost starting Quarterback Alexander Haupert to a knee injury. They also lost starting running back John Santiago also to knee injury.

Quarterfinals
N1	Dresden Monarchs	50
S4	Allgäu Comets	13
S2	Saarland Hurricanes	35
N3	Cologne Crocodiles	16
S1	Schwäbisch Hall Unicorns	38
N4	New Yorker Lions	13
N2	Potsdam Royals	36
S3	Munich Cowboys	23

Semifinals
N1	Dresden Monarchs	37
S2	Saarland Hurricanes	0
S1	Schwäbisch Hall Unicorns	28
N2	Potsdam Royals	18

German Bowl
N1	Dresden Monarchs	28
S1	Schwäbisch Hall Unicorns	19

== Game summary ==
Dresden, whose powerful passing offense led by Quarterback K. J. Carta-Samuels had dominated their division jumped out to an early lead of 7–0 (PAT, Finke) with a 14 yard reception by Darrell Stewart, but Hall managed to get within striking distance before the end of the first quarter with a 28 yard pass by German Quarterback Alexander Haupert to long time Hall receiver Tyler Rutenbeck. However, the ensuing point after Touchdown was not good and thus the score remained 7–6 for Dresden.

In the second quarter Dresden let several scoring opportunities slip through their fingers – turning the ball over twice in two drives separated by the injury of Alexander Haupert – already entering the game injured – who was hit on a dropback with his attempt to throw away the ball being ruled intentional grounding. Inside their own ten yard line and faced with over twenty yards to go, replacement Quarterback Reilly Hennessey finished the drive with a three and out and Hall's subsequent punt failed to cross Dresden's forty yard line. However, while the last drive had ended on a fumble by Whaley, who fumbled the ball at the 1 while jumping towards the end zone over several tackles, this drive of the Monarchs would end in an interception caught by Monteze Latimore in the Endzone. While Latimore was initially trying for a return, he stopped with the ball barely inside the Endzone after his feet had already left – this resulted in a touchback and Hall's ball at the twenty. Otherwise the result would've been a Safety. Thus profiting from defensive Big Plays, in the ensuing drive the Unicorns scored next with a 10 yard pass of Hennesy to Rutenbeck. However, the decision to go with a Two Point Conversion this time didn't pay off for Hall and the score remained 12–7 at half time. Moritz Böhringer, the intended target of the failed two point conversion pass, complained that a Dresden defender had grabbed his facemask and the TV images indeed showed contact, but there was no flag for that thrown by the referees. With only 30 seconds left on the clock in the first half, Dresden called two runs before deciding to go for a Hail Mary pass after all, but it fell incomplete. Out of time, Dresden knelt away the last three seconds of the half taking a five point deficit into the break.

In the second half, Monarchs Kicker Florian Finke hit the ball off-center on the top on the opening kickoff, meaning it didn't travel the requisite ten yards, resulting in Unicorns ball in their opponents' half of the field. Driving down the field, Schwäbisch Hall scored again and seemed to be putting away the game with a twelve point lead (this time the PAT was good) on a 26 yard pass by Hennesy to Yannick Mayr.

However, on their first possession of the new half the Monarchs regained old strengths and seemed to shift the momentum in their team's favor as they ate away 6:07 minutes of game time, driving down the field and ultimately scoring on a 12 yard run by Devwah Whaley. A crucial moment had come earlier in that drive when the Monarchs converted fourth and three at the 18 yard line on a short pass to Radim Kalous which the Czech receiver carried exactly to the fifteen yard line requiring the measuring sticks to be brought on the field before Dresden's first down was confirmed. After a blocked punt by Hall, Dresden was limited to a Field Goal this time – a 25 yarder made it 17–19 from the point of view of Dresden.

In the fourth quarter Dresden benefited from the field positions their kicking game gave them and took the lead for the first time in this half with a 26 yard chip shot through the uprights by Florian Finke. Hall was showing nerves, having been shut out since the first drive of the second half. In a "do or die" drive starting at their own three yard line Henesy threw to Rutenbeck who was covered by Dresden's Jonas Gacek – and Gacek came up with the ball. He would've carried it very close to or into the end zone if the referees hadn't accidentally blown the play dead early, but the interception stood. This turned out to be a blessing in disguise for the Monarchs as they were now able to chew another 2:26 off the clock before Carta-Samuels found Radim Kalous on a short pass which Kalous took to the house for a 16 yard touchdown. The ensuing two point conversion (Carta-Samuels pass to Whaley) made it a two score game. Receiving the ball back with 2:31 and down 19–28 Schwäbisch Hall was now in desperation mode. Caught in a Fourth Down with less than a minute left on the game clock and no timeouts remaining, the Unicorns decided to try for a Field Goal but their attempt fell short, turning the ball over one last time and giving Dresden the opportunity to run down the clock. After German Bowl XL and German Bowl XXXIX this was the third time a missed Field Goal attempt was the last play of relevance in a German Bowl involving Schwäbisch Hall, however, this time the missed attempt was by the 'corns and they consequently lost the game.
