= Bohringer =

Bohringer, Böhringer, or Boehringer is a surname of German origin. The name probably derives from the toponymic Böhringen, found mainly in Baden-Württemberg.

Notable people with the surname include:

- Richard Bohringer (born 1942), French actor
- Romane Bohringer (born 1973), French actress, film director, screenwriter and costume designer
- Moritz Böhringer (born 1993), German American football player for the Schwäbisch Hall Unicorns and Minnesota Vikings

== See also ==
- Boehringer (disambiguation)
