= Boehringer =

Boehringer (Böhringer) may refer to:

- Boehringer Ingelheim, a pharmaceutical company
- Boehringer Laboratories, an American medical technology company
- Boehringer Mannheim, a medical supplies company acquired by Roche Diagnostics
- Gebr. Boehringer (de:Gebr. Boehringer), original manufacturer of Unimog trucks
- Albert Boehringer (1861-1939), German chemist, company founder and industrialist
- Brian Boehringer (born 1969), former Major League Baseball pitcher
- Jorge Boehringer (born 1975), American musician
- Peter Boehringer (born 1969), German politician
- Robert Boehringer (1884–1974), German industrialist and poet
- Sandra Boehringer (born 1972), French historian
- Moritz Böhringer (born 1993), German American Football player

== See also ==
- Bohringer
