= Nick Alfieri =

American football player (born 1992)

Nicholas James Alfieri (born May 27, 1992) is a former American football linebacker who played for the Schwäbisch Hall Unicorns in the German Football League. He holds both U.S. and Italian citizenship, and was on the roster of the Italy national American football team for the 2021 European Championship. He played college football at Georgetown University.

== College career ==
Alfieri finished his collegiate career with 322 total tackles, making him only the third player in school history to reach 300 career tackles. Alfieri earned All Patriot League honors and was a team captain in 2014. In 2014, he wore the Joe Eacobacci #35 Memorial Jersey – a tribute to a former Georgetown football captain who was killed in the September 11 terrorist attacks.

== Professional career ==
On December 16, 2015, it was announced that Alfieri had signed with the Schwäbisch Hall Unicorns of the German Football League. He led them to German Bowls in 2017 and 2018, while finishing among the league leaders in tackles. He was joined on the team by his brother Michael ahead of the 2022 season. Alfieri announced his retirement from the Unicorns in February 2023.

== Personal life ==
Alfieri is from Bethany, Oregon. His father, Phil Alfieri, played college football at Oregon State University from 1983-1987. His mother ran track at OSU from 1984-1988. His younger brother, Joey, played college football for Stanford University, and is currently a player for the San Francisco 49ers. His younger brother Mikey Alfieri also played college football for OSU in 2018 and 2020-2021, and now plays for the Schwäbisch Hall Unicorns.

On his YouTube channel, Alfieri documented his thoughts and experiences about life in Germany as a football player. Alfieri has gained a large viewership especially in Germany, where his vlogs are appreciated for their interesting as well as entertaining content.
