= David Bada =

German gridiron football player (born 1995)

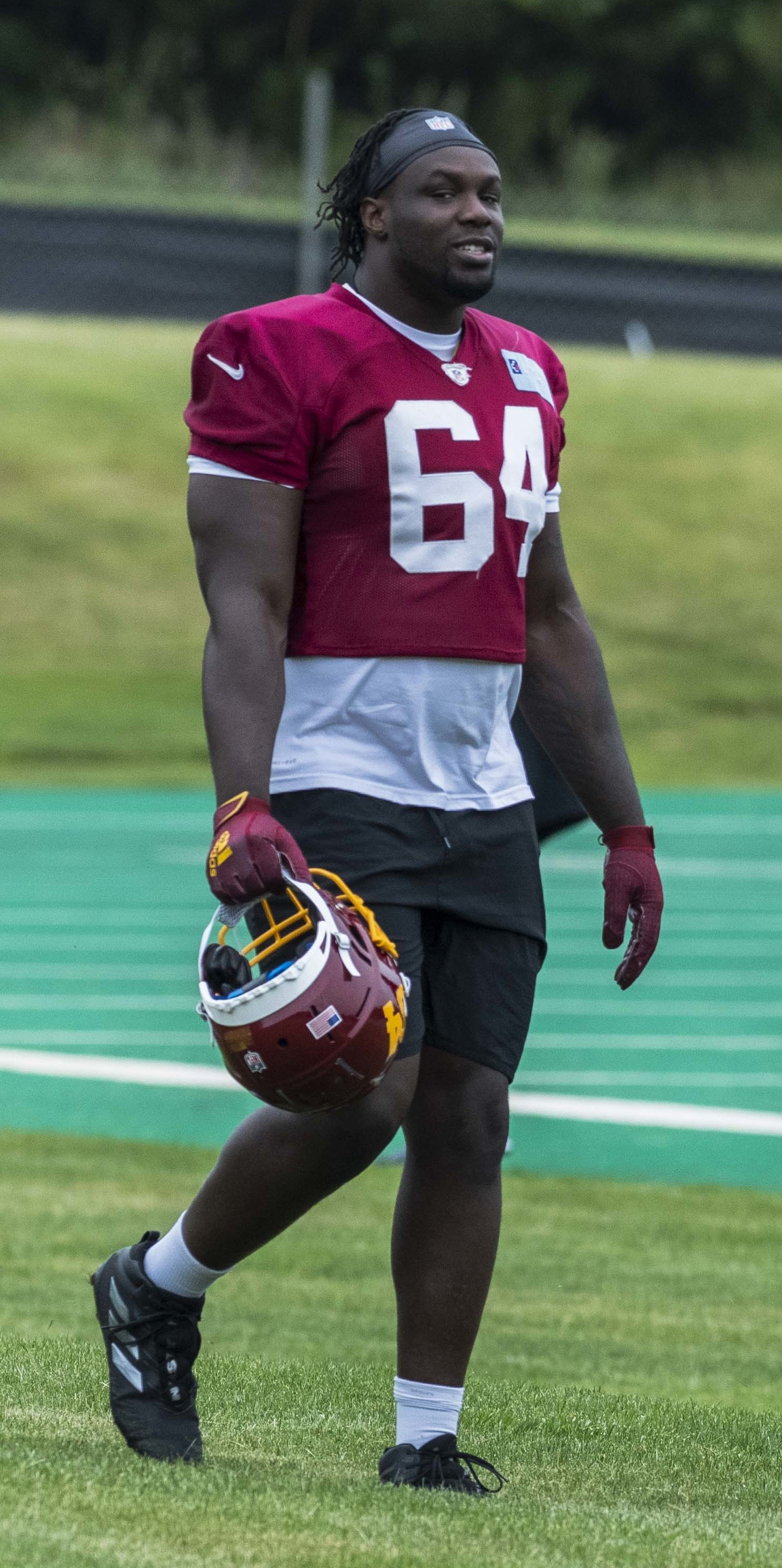
- Bada with the Washington Football Team in 2021

Profile
- Position: Defensive tackle

Personal information
- Born: April 24, 1995 (age 31); Munich, Bavaria, Germany
- Listed height: 6 ft 4 in (1.93 m)
- Listed weight: 292 lb (132 kg)

Career information
- NFL draft: 2020: undrafted

Career history
- Munich Cowboys (2014); Ingolstadt Dukes (2015–2017); Schwäbisch Hall Unicorns (2018–2019); Washington Football Team / Commanders (2020–2023); Detroit Lions (2024)

Awards and highlights
- German Bowl champion (XL)

Career NFL statistics
- Tackles: 2
- Stats at Pro Football Reference

David Bada (born April 24, 1995) is a German former professional American football defensive tackle. A native of Munich, he played in the German Football League prior to spending four seasons with the Washington Commanders in the early 2020s as part of the NFL's International Player Pathway Program.

== Professional career ==
Of Ghanaian descent, Bada was born on April 24, 1995, in Munich, Germany. He played in the German Football League as a member of the Munich Cowboys, Ingolstadt Dukes, and Schwäbisch Hall Unicorns, winning German Bowl XL with the latter in 2018.

=== Washington Football Team/Commanders ===
Bada was among several non-American players who participated in the National Football League's (NFL) International Player Pathway Program in 2019, with him being assigned to the Washington Commanders (Note: Known as the Washington Football Team at the time) for the 2020 season.

Bada spent the entire season with exempt status on Washington's practice squad, with him being retained under the same status for the 2021 season. He signed a futures contract with Washington on January 12, 2022. He was waived by the Commanders on August 30, 2022, and signed to the practice squad the next day. He moved to a standard practice squad contract in November 2022, which allowed him to play in games.

Bada was signed to the active roster on December 31, 2022. He was placed on injured reserve after tearing his triceps during practice on August 3, 2023.

=== Detroit Lions ===
On July 25, 2024, Bada signed with the Detroit Lions. He was waived/injured on August 27, and placed on injured reserve.
