= Moritz Böhringer =

German player of American football (born 1993)

Profile
- Position: Tight end

Personal information
- Born: October 16, 1993 (age 33); Stuttgart, Germany
- Listed height: 6 ft 5 in (1.96 m)
- Listed weight: 250 lb (113 kg)

Career information
- NFL draft: 2016: 6th round, 180th overall pick

Career history
- Crailsheim Titans (2013–2014); Schwäbisch Hall Unicorns (2015); Minnesota Vikings (2016–2017)*; Cincinnati Bengals (2018–2020)*; Schwäbisch Hall Unicorns (2021–2022); Stuttgart Surge (2023)
- * Offseason or practice squad member only

Awards and highlights
- German Football League Rookie of the Year (2015)
- Stats at Pro Football Reference

Moritz Wilhelm Böhringer (born October 16, 1993) is a German professional American football tight end. He was drafted by the Minnesota Vikings in the sixth round of the 2016 NFL draft. Böhringer was the first European player to be selected in the NFL draft without playing any college football.

== Early life ==
Böhringer played youth soccer in two local clubs in his hometown of Aalen. He says that he was inspired to play American football after watching a highlight reel of former Minnesota Vikings running back Adrian Peterson on YouTube when he was 17. In 2010, the town had the fledgling Aalen Limes Praetorians and even a baseball team, but no opportunity to play American football in a local junior team. Prior to being drafted into the NFL, Böhringer was majoring in mechanical engineering at Hochschule Aalen.

== Professional career ==
=== Crailsheim Titans ===
Böhringer joined the Crailsheim Titans under-19 junior team in 2011. In 2013 and 2014, he played for the Crailsheim Titans senior squad in Oberliga Baden-Württemberg.

=== Schwäbisch Hall Unicorns (first stint) ===
For the 2015 season, he moved to the nearby two-time German champions, the Schwäbisch Hall Unicorns of the German Football League (GFL). Parallel to the national league regular seasons, some of the best European American football clubs, mainly from German-speaking countries plus France, compete for the Eurobowl in the BIG6 European Football League. Böhringer's first big game was the Eurobowl XXIX 21–14 loss at the Braunschweig New Yorker Lions in June 2015. The Unicorns placed first in the GFL South Conference, advancing to the playoffs which ended in another loss (41–31) to the Lions in German Bowl XXXVII.

Böhringer played 16 GFL games and had 59 receptions for 1,232 yards and 13 touchdowns. He also had 14 kickoff returns for 415 yards and two touchdowns.

=== National Football League ===
==== Pre-draft ====
In early 2016, NFL scouts invited Böhringer to a Pro Day hosted by the Florida Atlantic Owls football team.

Pre-draft measurables
Height	Weight	Arm length	Hand span	40-yard dash	10-yard split	20-yard split	20-yard shuttle	Three-cone drill	Vertical jump	Broad jump	Bench press
6 ft 4 1/2 in (1.94 m)	227 lb (103 kg)	33 3/8	9 1/2	4.43 s	1.48 s	2.59 s	4.09 s	6.64 s	39 in (0.99 m)	10 ft 11 in (3.33 m)	17 reps
All values from Pro Day

==== Minnesota Vikings ====
Böhringer was selected in the sixth round (180th overall) of the 2016 NFL draft by the Minnesota Vikings. He signed his contract with the team on May 2, 2016. The same month, the NFL approved the use of the umlaut on his jersey, similar to the use of the cedilla for Pierre Garçon. On September 3, 2016, Böhringer was released by the Vikings as part of final roster cuts and was re-signed to the practice squad the next day. After spending the entire season on the practice squad, Böhringer signed a reserve/futures contract with the Vikings on January 2, 2017.

On September 2, 2017, Böhringer was waived by the Vikings.

==== Cincinnati Bengals ====
On May 1, 2018, Böhringer was signed by the Cincinnati Bengals as part of the NFL's International Player Pathway program after he chose to transition to tight end. He was waived on September 1, 2018, and was signed to the practice squad the next day. He signed a reserve/future contract with the Bengals on December 31, 2018.

On August 31, 2019, Böhringer was waived during final roster cuts and signed to the practice squad the next day. He signed a reserve/future contract with the Bengals on December 30, 2019. He was waived on August 3, 2020.

=== Schwäbisch Hall Unicorns (second stint) ===
Böhringer once more played for the Unicorns in the 2021 GFL season in which his team went 10–0 in the regular season before losing German Bowl XLII 28–19 to the Dresden Monarchs. In 13 games (regular season and playoffs combined) Böhringer had 37 receptions for 691 yards, leading his team in both categories. He scored 9 touchdowns through the air and had a rushing touchdown with three rushes for 30 yards.
