= Greg Seamon =

American football coach (born 1955)

Dresden Monachs
- Title: Head coach

Personal information
- Born: July 24, 1955 (age 71); Bright, Indiana, U.S.

Career information
- High school: Guilford (IN)
- College: Franklin (IN)

Career history

Coaching
- Bishop Chatard HS (IN) (1977–1980) Defensive coordinator; Purdue (1981) Tight ends coach; Purdue (1982) Outside linebackers coach; Army (1983–1984) Offensive line coach & running backs coach; Pacific (1985–1986) Offensive coordinator & quarterbacks coach; Navy (1987–1988) Quarterbacks coach; Akron (1991–1994) Offensive coordinator & quarterbacks coach; Cincinnati (1995–1998) Offensive coordinator & quarterbacks coach; Miami (OH) (1999–2000) Offensive coordinator & quarterbacks coach; Dallas Cowboys (2002) Tight ends coach; Cleveland Browns (2016–2018) Tight ends coach; Dresden Monarchs (2024–present) Head coach

Operations
- Cincinnati Bengals (2003) Advance scout; Cincinnati Bengals (2004–2015) Area scout

Greg Seamon (born July 25, 1955) is an American football coach. He is the head coach for the Dresden Monarchs of the German Football League (GFL). He served as an assistant coach for the Dallas Cowboys in 2002 and for the Cleveland Browns from 2016 to 2018.
