= Jordan Neuman =

American football player and coach (born 1983)

Jordan Neumann
Vienna Vikings
- Title: Offensive coordinator

Personal information
- Born: August 23, 1983 (age 43); Fort Worth, Texas, U.S.

Career information
- High school: Western Hills (Benbrook, Texas)
- College: McMurry

Career history

Playing
- Schwäbisch Hall Unicorns (2005–2008)

Coaching
- Schwäbisch Hall Unicorns (2009–2010) Offensive coordinator; Vienna Vikings (2011–2013) Offensive coordinator; Schwäbisch Hall Unicorns (2014–2022) Offensive coordinator (2014–2016) Head coach (2017–2022); German National American Football Team (2014–2022) Quarterback coach (2014–2020) Head coach (2021–2022); Stuttgart Surge (2022–2025) Head coach; Vienna Vikings (2026–present) Offensive coordinator (2026) Head coach (2027–present)

Awards and highlights
- As coach: 2× Austrian Bowl Champion (2012, 2013); 1× Eurobowl Champion (2013); 1× European Champion (2014); 2× CEFL Bowl Champion (2021, 2022); 3× German Bowl Champion (2017, 2018, 2022); 1x European League of Football Champion (2025); 2x European League of Football division title (2023, 2025)

Jordan Neuman (born August 23, 1983) is an American football coach and former player.

== Early life ==
Neuman played football as a student at Western Hills High School in Benbrook, Texas. From 2001 to 2004, he was quarterback of the McMurry University football team in the U.S. state of Texas. In 2005, he moved to Germany and played for the Schwäbisch Hall Unicorns in the German Football League. At the same time, he was involved in the club's youth activities and was also the player-coach of the Schwäbisch Hall Renegades baseball team.

== Coaching career ==
After the 2008 season, he ended his competitive playing sports career in Schwäbisch Hall and shifted completely to his coaching duties. In 2009 and 2010, Neuman coordinated the offensive play of the Schwäbisch Hall Unicorns as a member of the coaching staff, and from 2011 to 2013 he served in the same capacity for the Vienna Vikings. With the Vienna Vikings, he won the Austrian Football League championship twice as well as the Eurobowl title.

He returned to the Schwäbisch Hall Unicorns for the 2014 season, working again as offensive coordinator and at the same time in the youth team. In addition, he joined the coaching staff of the German men's national team in 2014, where he took over coaching the players at the quarterback position, including at the 2014 European Championships when the Germans won gold. In March 2021, he became the full-time national coach on a part-time basis. In October 2016, Neuman became Schwäbisch Hall's new head coach, succeeding Siegfried Gehrke. Neuman, whose wife is from Schwäbisch Hall, led the team to win the German championship in 2017 and 2018 after the "Unicorns" had finished second in each of the previous three years. In 2019 and 2021, he finished second in the German championship with the team. In contrast, Neuman achieved his first international success as head coach with the Unicorns in 2021, winning the Central European Football League (CEFL). In addition to his role as head coach of the Schwäbisch Hall Unicorns, Neuman also took charge of the club's youth academy.

From the time he took over until German Bowl XLI in 2019, his team managed a winning streak of 50 consecutive games in the German Football League (main round and playoffs). This streak was longer than that of THW Kiel in the Handball Bundesliga (40 wins from 2011 to 2013) and FC Bayern München in the Football Bundesliga (19 wins in 2013 and 2014). In 2022, Neuman led Schwäbisch Hall to win the German championship for the first time since 2018 and defended the championship title in the CEFL.

In October 2022, Neuman moved to the Stuttgart Surge in the European League of Football (ELF) and led the Surge to reach the 2023 (ELF) championship game before losing. The Surge had gone winless in the 2022 season before Neuman took over.
