= BIG6 European Football League =

American football cup competition

- Sport: Gridiron football
- Founded: 2014
- Folded: 2018
- No. of teams: 6
- Continent: Europe
- Most titles: New Yorker Lions (4)
- Relegation to: European Football League
- Related competitions: Eurobowl

The BIG6 European Football League (BIG6) was a European Cup style tournament for European American football teams. Originally organized by the EFAF (European Federation of American Football), the tournament had been run by the German Football League International since 2015. The final game of the BIG6 was called the EFL Bowl from 2014-2018. Previously the final game of the European Football League was called the Eurobowl and had been held annually since 1986 to 2014.

== History ==
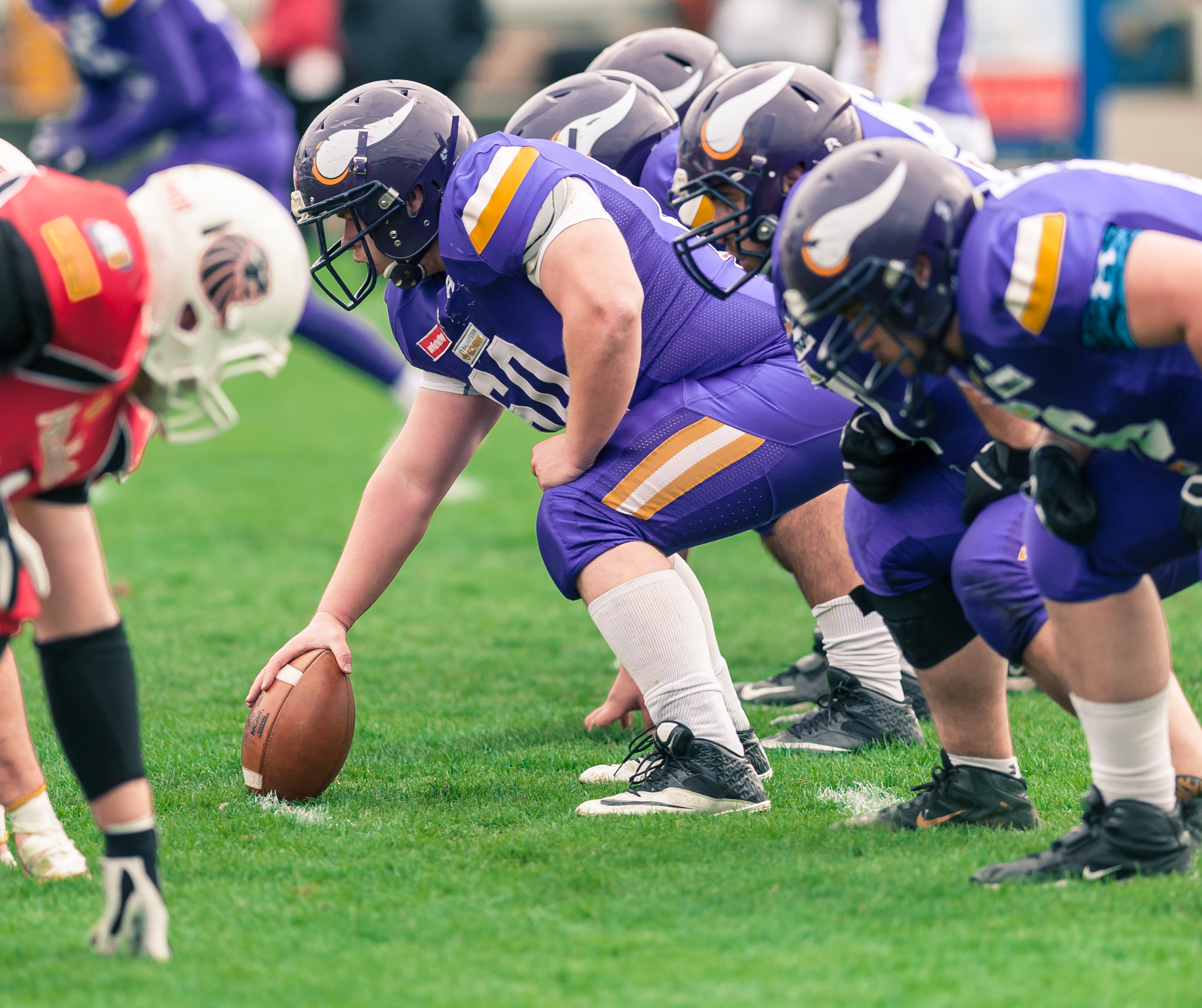
BIG6 game between the Vikings Vienna and the New Yorker Lions, 24 April 2016.

In 2014, the newly created BIG6 European Football League was introduced as the new top-tier competition of American football in Europe, replacing the old European Football League (EFL). The EFL continued to be played as a second-tier competition, with its teams now playing for the newly created EFL Bowl trophy instead of the Eurobowl.

The BIG6 initially consisted of three teams from Germany, two from Austria and one from Switzerland, the clubs being Berlin Adler, New Yorker Lions, Dresden Monarchs, Raiffeisen Vikings Vienna, Swarco Raiders Tirol and the Calanda Broncos. The Berlin Adler became inaugural BIG6 champions, defeating fellow German club New Yorker Lions 20–17 in Eurobowl XXVIII.

For the 2015 season, Dresden and the Calanda Broncos were replaced by the Schwäbisch Hall Unicorns (Germany) and the La Courneuve Flash (France), making La Courneuve the first team from outside of German-speaking Europe to enter the competition. In Eurobowl XXIX, the New Yorker Lions defeated fellow German club Schwäbisch Hall Unicorns 24–14.

For the 2016 season, the Flash were replaced by fellow French club Aix-en-Provence Argonautes. The 2016 season saw the first time that a non-German team survived the group stage when the Swarco Raiders Tirol knocked out the Schwäbisch Hall Unicorns in the last group match to advance to Eurobowl XXX against the New Yorker Lions. In the final in Innsbruck, the Lions defeated the Raiders 35–21.

Before the 2017 season, both Austrian clubs left the BIG6. Aside from founding members New Yorker Lions, the league's management invited the Amsterdam Crusaders (Netherlands), the Carlstad Crusaders (Sweden), the Frankfurt Universe (Germany), the Milano Seamen (Italy) and one team from Berlin (either founding members Berlin Adler or the Berlin Rebels) to join the league for the new season. However, Carlstad's participation was vetoed by the Swedish American Football Federation. On 1 February 2017, it was announced that the Amsterdam Crusaders, the Badalona Dracs (Spain), the Berlin Rebels, the Frankfurt Universe, the Milano Seamen and the New Yorker Lions would be the six teams to compete in the 2017 BIG6 European Football League. From 2017 on, the last placed team of the BIG6 may have to play a relegation game against the winners of the EFL Bowl, and be relegated to the EFL if they lose. So far, this rule was never applied.

For the 2018 season, which was the league's last, the BIG6 was reduced to four teams.

== Teams ==
Location of teams in the BIG6 European Football League.
2018 teams, former teams.

Team	City, country	Stadium	Seasons in BIG6	Champions	Runners-up
(France) Aix-en-Provence Argonautes	Aix-en-Provence, France	Stade Georges-Carcassonne	1 (2016)		
(Netherlands) Amsterdam Crusaders	Amsterdam, Netherlands	Sportpark Sloten	2 (2017–2018)		
(Spain) Badalona Dracs	Badalona, Spain	Camp Municipal de Badalona	1 (2017)		
(Germany) Berlin Adler	Berlin, Germany	Friedrich-Ludwig-Jahn-Sportpark; Poststadion	3 (2014–2016)	2014	
(Germany) Berlin Rebels	Berlin, Germany	Mommsenstadion	1 (2017)		
(Switzerland) Calanda Broncos	Landquart, Switzerland	Stadion Ringstrasse, Chur	1 (2014)		
(Germany) Dresden Monarchs	Dresden, Germany	Glücksgas Stadium (Note: The normal home venue for the Monarchs at the time was the Heinz Steyer Stadion, however special games (such as the lone Big6 home game) have often been held in the bigger stadium instead.)	1 (2014)		
(Germany) Frankfurt Universe	Frankfurt, Germany	Frankfurter Volksbank Stadion	2 (2017–2018)		2017, 2018
(France) La Courneuve Flash	La Courneuve, France	Stade de Marville	2 (2015, 2018)		
(Italy) Milano Seamen	Milan, Italy	Stadio Breda, Sesto San Giovanni	1 (2017)		
(Germany) New Yorker Lions	Braunschweig, Germany	Eintracht-Stadion; Stadion am Salzgittersee, Salzgitter	5 (2014–2018)	2015, 2016, 2017, 2018	2014
(Germany) Schwäbisch Hall Unicorns	Schwäbisch Hall, Germany	Hagenbachstadion; Optima Sportpark	2 (2015–2016)		2015
(Austria) Swarco Raiders Tirol	Innsbruck, Austria	Tivoli-Neu	3 (2014–2016)		2016
(Austria) Vienna Vikings	Vienna, Austria	Hohe Warte Stadium; FAC-Platz	3 (2014–2016)		

== Eurobowl Champions ==
For a list of champions by year (1986–2018), see Eurobowl.

== See also ==
- Eurobowl
- EFAF
