= Boehringer Laboratories =

Boehringer Laboratories, LLC.
- Type: Private
- Industry: Medical devices, Medical technology
- Headquarters: Phoenixville, Pennsylvania, USA
- Products: Respiratory Therapy, Autologous Blood Recovery, Suction Controls and Minimally Invasive Surgery
- Website: www.boehringerlabs.com,

Boehringer Laboratories, LLC. is a family owned American medical technology company with headquarters in Phoenixville, Pennsylvania. Boehringer has introduced innovations in respiratory therapy and minimally invasive surgery, earning US and foreign patents.

== Market segments ==
Boehringer operates in 5 market segments:

- Anesthesia Products
- Suction Controls
- Minimally Invasive Surgery
- Respiratory Therapy
- Autotransfusion

== History ==
Boehringer is a FDA-registered medical device company located in Phoenixville, PA founded by Jack Boehringer in 1972. The company initially released a line of anesthesia and respiratory care instruments, followed by suction regulators and autologous blood transfusion products. In 2007 Boehringer introduced the Engenex product line, entering the negative pressure wound therapy market. In 2010 Boehringer moved from Norristown, PA to Phoenixville, PA. In 2013 Boehringer received clearance for ViSiGi 3D gastric sizing tube for single patient use. This is the first FDA-approved calibration system intended for sleeve gastrectomy. The world's first and only 4-mode suction regulator was introduced in 2015.

Boehringer spirometers were selected by the American Medical Research Expedition to Everest. They were used on the expedition to measure the effects of altitude on respiratory function. The spirometers have been used to measure control of ventilation related to high-altitude pulmonary edema, to determine the efficacy of pharmaceutical treatments for acute mountain sickness, and to determine the efficacy of mechanical treatments for mountain sickness. Boehringer spirometers have also been used in hospital studies, typically related to anesthesia and patient monitoring.

Boehringer Inspiratory Force Meters with memory have been used in predicting the efficacy of neonate extubation and identifying the number of maneuvers required to accurately measure maximal inspiratory mouth pressure in patients with chronic airflow obstruction.
