= German Bowl XL =

Annual American football game in Germany

2018 German Bowl
Frankfurt Universe	Schwäbisch Hall Unicorns
(12–2 (Note: Frankfurt was deducted "four points" (equivalent to two victories) from their standings due to licensing irregularities, but that had no influence on league standings. They won 12 of their regular season games, losing only their two games against Braunschweig, so that is the record displayed here))	(14–0)
GFL South	GFL South
19	21
Head coach: Brian Caler	Head coach: Jordan Neuman
	1	2	3	4	Total
Frankfurt	13	0	0	6	19
Schwäbisch Hall	0	7	0	14	21
- Date: October 13, 2018
- Stadium: Friedrich Ludwig Jahn Sportpark
- Location: Berlin
- Attendance: 15.213

German Bowl XL was the 40th annual Championship Game of the German Football League crowning the winner of the 2018 season. Frankfurt Universe reached the Bowl for the first time, but lost to defending champion Schwäbisch Hall Unicorns by 21–19.

== Background ==
Frankfurt Universe had been founded by fans of the defunct Frankfurt Galaxy after the 2007 NFL Europa season ended with both the league and the Frankfurt franchise being dissolved on the orders of NFL commissioner Roger Goodell, who had taken over the office from NFL Europe booster and founder Paul Tagliabue the previous year. Taking the field for the first time in 2008 in the fifth tier Landesliga Hessen, they would make their way through the American football league pyramid of Germany, before reaching the first tier German Football League playing their first season in the top flight of American football in Germany in 2016. While the team proved an immediate playoff contender, their 2016 campaign ended in the quarter-finals with a 10–7 defeat to the Kiel Baltic Hurricanes while in 2017 the defending champion Braunschweig Lions knocked them out in the semifinal 23–21 after Universe had given the Dresden Monarchs their first quarter-final defeat in eight years. Universe was the first team from Frankfurt am Main since the Frankfurter Löwen (the first American Football team founded in Germany) to reach the German Bowl and German Bowl XL was the first time since German Bowl III (1981) that two teams from the GFL South (per the current division of Germany into GFL divisions) faced each other in the final breaking decades of northern dominance by shutting out the North from the final for the first time in 37 years.

The Schwäbisch Hall Unicorns reached the German Bowl comfortably by dominating their division (the only games where the result was in much doubt were those against Frankfurt) and prevailed in the playoffs to reach their fifth consecutive German Bowl with the possibility of defending their 2017 title and earning their fourth national championship in club history.

The conventional wisdom in the GFL said that no team usually wins three matchups against the same opponent in one season (notwithstanding that Braunschweig had done so as recently as German Bowl XXXV when they dealt the Dresden Monarchs their third defeat against the same opponent that year) and the Frankfurt team, bolstered by their sponsors Samsung and strong attendance figures, had assembled a veritable "All Star Team" of players that had been on the rosters of various top teams throughout Europe in previous years went into the game confidently, especially since they had eliminated the strongly rated Braunschweig squad in the semifinal on the road to reach the Bowl. Still, the Unicorns as defending champions and observers expected a close matchup with small individual actions perhaps making the difference between victory and defeat.

== Road to the Bowl ==
The biggest surprise of the quarter-finals was ironically the difficulty Frankfurt had in overcoming the Berlin Rebels in a game with now touchdowns, ultimately prevailing 6–5 on two out of two attempted Field Goals being good. Otherwise, all home teams won their quarter finals in convincing fashion. In the semifinal the Dresden Monarchs had to travel to Schwäbisch Hall for the fourth time since 2014 and once again the Unicorns defeated their Saxonian rivals. The other semifinal saw a repeat of the one from the previous year with the Braunschweig Lions hosting Frankfurt Universe. In a close game, the score remained tied 10–10 at the end of regulation and overtime according to (modified) NCAA-rules had to be played. Each team would get a chance at scoring starting at the opponent's 25 yard line in turn until after an equal number of possessions, one team was ahead. Braunschweig having a chance to score first, both teams scored touchdowns and point after Touchdowns on their first possession but on the second possession, the Frankfurt Defense managed to grab an Interception and thus on the ensuing possession by Frankfurt all it took them was an easy Field Goal to advance to their first ever German Bowl, leaving record champion Braunschweig out of the final for the first time since 2012.

Quarterfinals
N1	New Yorker Lions	59
S4	Munich Cowboys	14
S2	Frankfurt Universe	6
N3	Berlin Rebels	5
S1	Schwäbisch Hall Unicorns	37
N4	Cologne Crocodiles	14
N2	Dresden Monarchs	51
S3	Allgäu Comets	19

Semifinals
New Yorker Lions	17
Frankfurt Universe	20
Schwäbisch Hall Unicorns	23
Dresden Monarchs	7

German Bowl
Frankfurt Universe	19
Schwäbisch Hall Unicorns	21

== Game summary ==
Frankfurt had the better start and scored both the first Touchdown on an 11-yard run by French Runninback Andreas Betza and the second one on a 13-yard pass by Eiffers to the Finnish Wideout Sebastien Sagne who had played for the Dresden Monarchs the previous two seasons. However, the first Point after Touchdown attempt was blocked and so it was "only" 13–0 at the end of the first quarter. Hall's first drive ended in an Interception in their own half when Poznanski picked off a pass intended for Ari Adegbesan and their second drive fizzled out around mid field forcing them to punt.

The Unicorns, led by the quarterback of the Germany national American football team, Marco Ehrenfried, who had already led his team to victory in German Bowl XXXIX and the 2014 European Championship finally got on the scoreboard in the second quarter, when Ehrenfried found Tyler Rutenbeck for 42 yard Touchdown pass making it 13–7 with the PAT. The rest of the second quarter saw both teams trade punts until Frankfurt failed to convert on fourth and nine with seconds to go in the half, giving Hall the ball back with not enough time to take advantage of it.

The Unicorns received the Kickoff to open the second half but after driving down to their opponents' 33-yard line, Ehrenfried was sacked on fourth and 9 giving up the ball on downs. Frankfurt drove the ball down all the way to the 16 yard line but after a delay of game penalty, Duis – whose Field Goals had been instrumental to winning the quarter-finals and Semifinal – missed a 39-yarder leaving Universe with nothing to show for their trip to the Red Zone. On the next drive, Ehrenfried fumbled the ball at their own 22 yard-line but the one yard line would be as far as Frankfurt would get and Duis once again missed a Field Goal attempt – this time from only 18 yards out.

Universe thus failing to take advantage of Hall's mistakes gave Ehrenfried another opportunity to drive down the field and this time he took it, ultimately scoring on a 2-yarder to Nate Robitaille, giving Hall the lead for the first time early in the fourth Quarter at 14–13. Frankfurt now under pressure began to show nervousness and Niclas Knoblauch scored on a strip-sack when Frankfurt's Quarterback Andrew Elffers couldn't hold onto the ball after being hit by Wilson. Schwäbisch Hall was now up 21–13 and Frankfurt would now need a Touchdown and a Two Point Conversion to even the score, their failed kicks now hurting them dearly. Both teams followed up with quick three-and-outs before Frankfurt got the ball back with 2:42 remaining. Quickly moving the chains, Elffers found Thomas for a 12-yard Touchdown pass and now the Two Point Conversion attempt would decide whether Hall would hold onto a narrow lead. Thrown back to the 8-yard line by a delay of game penalty, the two point conversion attempt failed. However, Frankfurt would still get another chance to win the game when they somehow recovered the ball when a Hall player touched but could not secure the ensuing kickoff with a Frankfurt player ultimately coming up with the ball. Frankfurt had just enough time to get into what should have been Field Goal range, but Duis once more failed to hit the target on a 33-yarder giving Schwäbisch Hall their second consecutive German Bowl win to end with a missed Field Goal attempt by their adversaries.
