= Braunschweig Lions =

American football team from Germany

- Founded: 1987; 39 years ago
- League: German Football League
- Team history: Braunschweig Lions (1987–2010; 2026-Present) Hygia Lions (2010–2011) New Yorker Lions (2011 – 2025)
- Based in: Braunschweig, Germany
- Stadium: Eintracht-Stadion
- Colors: White and Red
- President: Marco Drescher
- Head coach: Brayden McCombs
- Championships: Eurobowl: 1999, 2003, 2015–2018 German Bowl: 1997–1999, 2005–2008, 2013–2016, 2019
- Website: braunschweig-lions.de

The Braunschweig Lions are an American football team from Braunschweig, Germany. The Lions are founded 1987 and hold the record of twelve German Bowl victories. From 1997 to 2008, the team played in twelve consecutive German Bowls. Both the team name of the team and the logo are derived from the Brunswick Lion, the landmark of Braunschweig.

Between 2011 and 2025, the team was known as the New Yorker Lions. Under this name, the Lions won five more German titles and became the most successful American football club in Europe winning four consecutive Eurobowls.

== History ==
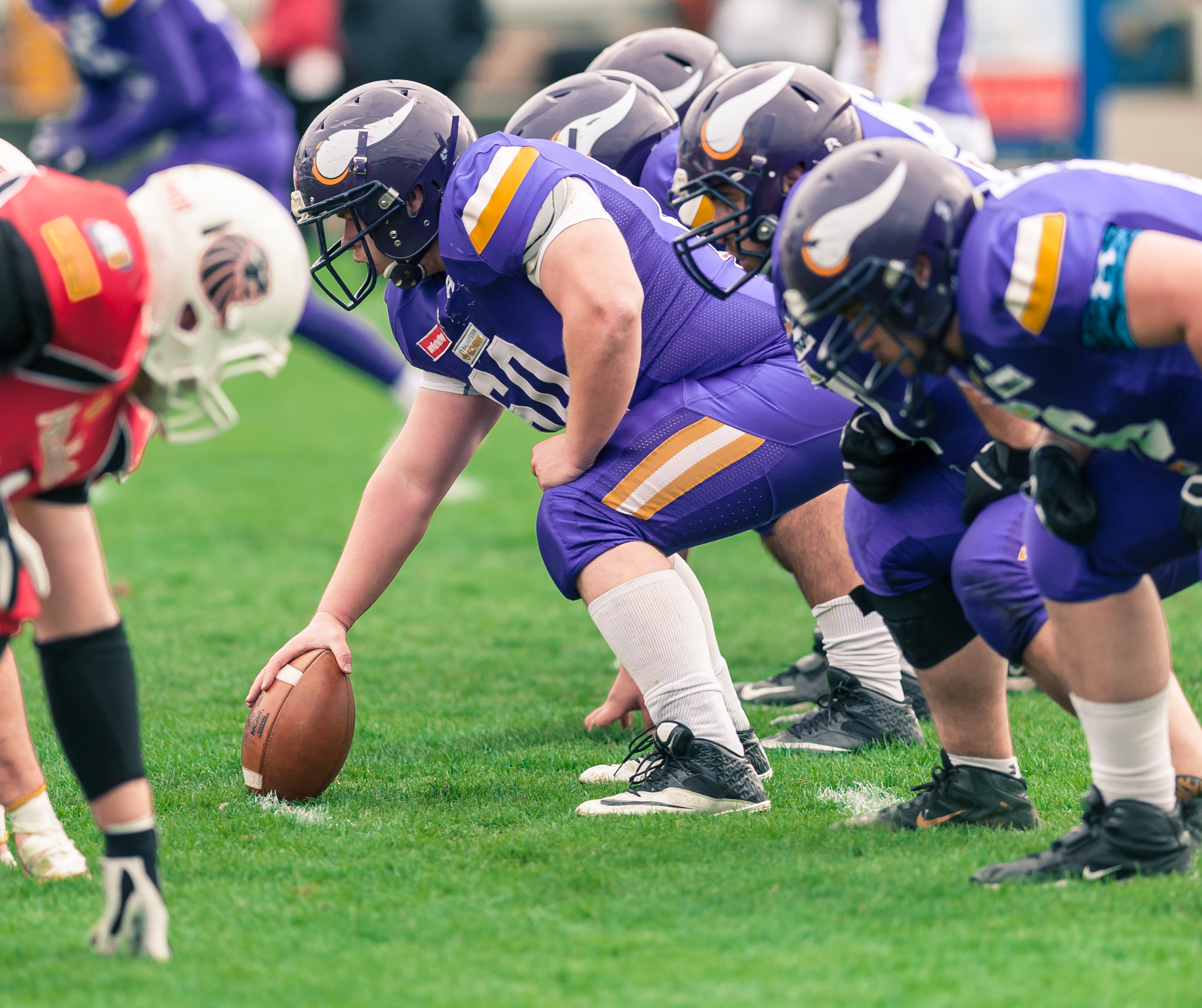
BIG6 game between the Vikings Vienna and the New Yorker Lions, 24 April 2016.

The Braunschweig Lions were formed in 1987 and the new team entered the tier-three Regionalliga Nord for that season, where it came third. The Lions were nevertheless promoted to the 2nd Bundesliga, now the German Football League 2, for the following season and spent the next six years at this level. The team was never outstanding at this level for the first five years, only finishing once with a percentage above 0.500 in this era.

In 1993, the Lions finally managed to win their division and earn promotion to the American football Bundesliga, now the German Football League. The team performed well at this level in its first season there, finishing fourth and qualifying for the play-offs, where they were knocked-out in the quarter-finals. The following season, 1995, saw the club miss the play-offs but in 1996 they returned and reached the semi-finals, losing to the Hamburg Blue Devils and beginning what was to become a strong football rivalry in the following decade.

The year 1997 saw the beginning of the golden era of the Braunschweig Lions and the most successful era of any American football club in Germany to date. The Lions were to play in every one of the next twelve German Bowls.

The club won the first three of those, the first one against the Cologne Crocodiles and title number two and three against the Hamburg Blue Devils, the latest in front of a record crowd of over 30,000 in Hamburg. That year, the Lions also took out the Eurobowl, once more playing a final against the Blue Devils there, too. The next five seasons, the Lions were to lose five German Bowls in a row. The 2000 edition saw revenge for the Cologne Crocodiles, the following three were all lost to the Blue Devils. The fifth and final loss came to the Berlin Adler. In this era, the only title the club did manage to win was another Eurobowl in 2003.

The Lions then once more turned fortunes around and managed to set a new record by winning the next four German Bowls in a row. In the four finals, they faced four different opponents. In 2005, the Blue Devils were their Bowl opponent for a sixth time, in 2006 and 2007, it had to face opposition from the southern division, the Marburg Mercenaries and the Stuttgart Scorpions, while the final victory came against the Kiel Baltic Hurricanes in 2008.

After winning those four consecutive titles, they faced drastic restructuring in 2009 and did therefore not qualify for the play-offs at all, but returned in 2010, when they lost to the Marburg Mercenaries in the quarter-finals.

Logo used from 2011 until 2025.

In March 2011, the club announced that the team would carry a new name for the 2011 season. Their name is shared with the fashion label New Yorker, a sponsor of the team. The Lions had an average 2011 season, in which they won only four season games and finished well clear of the play-off ranks. In 2012, the club came sixth in the northern division of the GFL and failed to qualify for the play-offs.

In 2013, the Lions returned to their old dominance, winning 13 of their 14 regular season games as well as the GFL Northern Division title. After play-off wins against the Rhein-Neckar Bandits and the Kiel Baltic Hurricanes the team reached its first German Bowl since 2008, which they won by a point against the Dresden Monarchs. In the following six seasons the Lions won the northern division and missed the German Bowl only once when they lost their semi final against Frankfurt Universe in 2018.

In 2014, the club took part in a new European competition, the BIG6 European Football League, which in its first season consisted of three teams from Germany, two from Austria and one from Switzerland, the clubs being Berlin Adler, New Yorker Lions, Dresden Monarchs, Raiffeisen Vikings Vienna, Swarco Raiders Tirol and the Calanda Broncos. The two best teams of this competition advanced to the Eurobowl XXVIII, where the Lions lost 20–17 to the Berlin Adler. The BIG6 was discontinued in 2018 and therefore had only five seasons. In each of these the Lions made in to the Eurobowl and won all of the following.

In the GFL the Lions won the northern division once more in 2014 and defeated the Munich Cowboys 69–28 in the quarter-finals and the Cologne Falcons 52–3 in the semi-finals of the play-offs to reach the 2014 German Bowl. The Lions won the championship game against the Schwäbisch Hall Unicorns 47–9 and took out their ninth national title, staying undefeated in the GFL that season.

In 2015, the Lions won their third Eurobowl, again defeating the Schwäbisch Hall Unicorns. The team also won the northern division of the GFL once more and defeated the Saarland Hurricanes in the quarter-finals and the Allgäu Comets in the semi-finals of the play-offs, facing the Schwäbisch Hall Unicorns next in the German Bowl once more, which the Lions won 41–31.

== Teams ==
Apart from the first team, the club also fields a reserve side, two youth teams, the Junior Lions and the Red Cubs 94, a Flag Football team and a women's team, the Lady Lions. All six teams are part of the mother club 1. FFC Braunschweig.

== Honours ==
- Eurobowl
  - Champions: (6) 1999, 2003, 2015–2018
  - Runners-up: (2) 2002, 2014
- German Bowl
  - Champions: (12) 1997–1999, 2005–2008, 2013–2016, 2019
  - Runners-up: (6) 2000–2004, 2017
- EFL
  - Participations: (7) 1998–2000, 2002, 2003, 2006, 2009
- BIG6 European Football League
  - Participations: (4) 2014–2018
- GFL
  - Northern Division champions: (15) 1998, 1999, 2002–2007, 2013–2019
  - Play-off qualification: (26) 1994, 1996–2008, 2010, 2013–2019, 2021–2024
  - League membership: (32) 1994–present
- GFL2
  - Northern Division champions: 1993

== German Bowl appearances ==
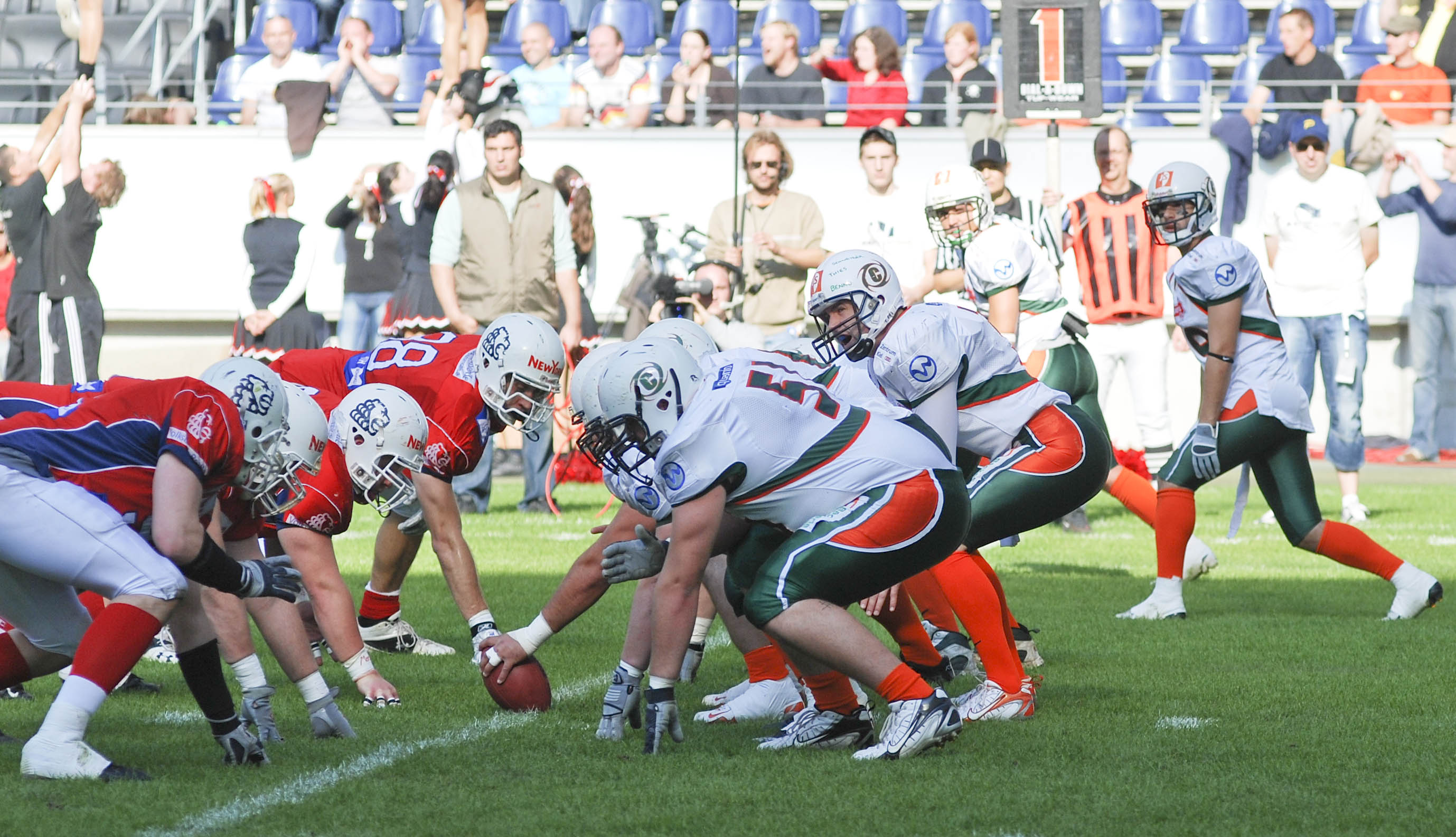
German Bowl XXX in 2008, Braunschweig Lions vs Kiel Baltic Hurricanes.

The club's appearances in the German Bowl:

Bowl	Date	Champions	Runners-Up	Score	Location	Attendance
XIX	October 4, 1997	Braunschweig Lions	Cologne Crocodiles	26–23	Hamburg	14,800
XX	October 3, 1998	Braunschweig Lions	Hamburg Blue Devils	20–14	Hamburg	22,100
XXI	October 9, 1999	Braunschweig Lions	Hamburg Blue Devils	25–24	Hamburg	30,400
XXII	October 7, 2000	Cologne Crocodiles	Braunschweig Lions	31–29	Braunschweig	20,312
XXIII	October 6, 2001	Hamburg Blue Devils	Braunschweig Lions	31–13	Hanover	23,193
XXIV	October 12, 2002	Hamburg Blue Devils	Braunschweig Lions	16–13	Braunschweig	21,097
XXV	October 11, 2003	Hamburg Blue Devils	Braunschweig Lions	37–36	Wolfsburg	20,517
XXVI	October 9, 2004	Berlin Adler	Braunschweig Lions	10–7	Braunschweig	17,200
XXVII	October 8, 2005	Braunschweig Lions	Hamburg Blue Devils	31–28	Hanover	19,512
XXVIII	October 7, 2006	Braunschweig Lions	Marburg Mercenaries	31–13	Braunschweig	15,897
XXIX	October 6, 2007	Braunschweig Lions	Stuttgart Scorpions	27–6	Stuttgart	8,152
XXX	September 29, 2008	Braunschweig Lions	Kiel Baltic Hurricanes	20–14	Frankfurt	16,177
XXXV	October 12, 2013	New Yorker Lions	Dresden Monarchs	35–34	Berlin	12,157
XXXVI	October 11, 2014	New Yorker Lions	Schwäbisch Hall Unicorns	47–9	Berlin	12,531
XXXVII	October 10, 2015	New Yorker Lions	Schwäbisch Hall Unicorns	41–31	Berlin	12,051
XXXVIII	October 8, 2016	New Yorker Lions	Schwäbisch Hall Unicorns	31–20	Berlin	13,047
XXXIX	October 7, 2017	Schwäbisch Hall Unicorns	New Yorker Lions	14–13	Berlin	13,502
XLI	October 12, 2019	New Yorker Lions	Schwäbisch Hall Unicorns	10–7	Frankfurt	20,382

== Eurobowl appearances ==
The club's appearances in the Eurobowl:

Bowl	Date	Champions	Runners-Up	Score	Location	Attendance
XIII	June 26, 1999	Braunschweig Lions	Hamburg Blue Devils	27–23	Hamburg	20,900
XVI	July 6, 2002	Bergamo Lions	Braunschweig Lions	27–20	Braunschweig	8,741
XVII	July 5, 2003	Braunschweig Lions	Chrysler Vienna Vikings	21–14	Braunschweig	7,878
XXVIII	July 19, 2014	Berlin Adler	New Yorker Lions	20–17	Berlin	2,368
XXIX	July 20, 2015	New Yorker Lions	Schwäbisch Hall Unicorns	24–14	Braunschweig	5,068
XXX	June 11, 2016	New Yorker Lions	Swarco Raiders Tirol	35–21	Innsbruck	4,853
XXXI	June 10, 2017	New Yorker Lions	Frankfurt Universe	55–14	Frankfurt	7,693
XXXII	June 9, 2018	New Yorker Lions	Frankfurt Universe	20–19	Frankfurt	3,122

== Recent seasons ==
Recent seasons of the Lions:

Year	Division	Finish	Points	Pct.	Games	W	D	L	PF	PA	Postseason
2005	GFL (North)	1st	18–6	0.750	12	9	0	3	410	177	Won QF: Saarland Hurricanes (32–17) Won SF: Schwäbisch Hall Unicorns (33–8) Won GB: Hamburg Blue Devils (31–28)
2006	GFL (North)	1st	22–2	0.917	12	11	0	1	483	165	Won QF: Darmstadt Diamonds (79–0) Won SF: Stuttgart Scorpions (36–17) Won GB: Marburg Mercenaries (31–13)
2007	GFL (North)	1st	23–1	0.958	12	11	1	0	354	166	Won QF: Weinheim Longhorns (55–26) Won SF: Marburg Mercenaries (26–21) Won GB: Stuttgart Scorpions (27–6)
2008	GFL (North)	2nd	17–7	0.708	12	8	1	3	328	214	Won QF: Munich Cowboys (32–13) Won SF: Marburg Mercenaries (49–21) Won GB: Kiel Baltic Hurricanes (20–14)
2009	GFL (North)	5th	6–14	0.300	10	3	0	7	168	212	—
2010	GFL (North)	4th	10–14	0.417	12	4	2	6	258	247	Lost QF: Marburg Mercenaries (21–31)
2011	GFL (North)	6th	8–20	0.286	14	4	0	10	222	311	—
2012	GFL (North)	6th	8–20	0.286	14	4	0	10	374	497	—
2013	GFL (North)	1st	26–2	0.929	14	13	0	1	493	177	Won QF: Rhein-Neckar Bandits (28–21) Won SF: Kiel Baltic Hurricanes (34–29) Won GB: Dresden Monarchs (35–34)
2014	GFL (North)	1st	24–0	1.000	12	12	0	0	547	126	Won QF: Munich Cowboys (69–28) Won SF: Cologne Falcons (52–3) Won GB: Schwäbisch Hall Unicorns (47–9)
2015	GFL (North)	1st	22–2	0.917	12	11	0	1	483	148	Won QF: Saarland Hurricanes (57–14) Won SF: Allgäu Comets (42–21) Won GB: Schwäbisch Hall Unicorns (41–31)
2016	GFL (North)	1st	24–4	0.857	14	11	2	1	547	171	Won QF: Allgäu Comets (30–6) Won SF: Kiel Baltic Hurricanes (38–21) Won GB: Schwäbisch Hall Unicorns (31–20)
2017	GFL (North)	1st	28–0	1.000	14	14	0	0	609	132	Won QF: Ingolstadt Dukes (47–6) Won SF: Frankfurt Universe (23–21) Lost GB: Schwäbisch Hall Unicorns (13–14)
2018	GFL (North)	1st	23–5	0.821	14	11	1	2	526	178	Won QF: Munich Cowboys (59–14) Lost SF: Frankfurt Universe (17–20)
2019	GFL (North)	1st	28–0	1.000	14	14	0	0	586	179	Won QF: Stuttgart Scorpions (70–3) Won SF: Frankfurt Universe (36–18) Won GB: Schwäbisch Hall Unicorns (10–7)
2020	GFL (North)	No season played because of the COVID-19 pandemic									
2021	GFL (North)	4th	10–10	0.500	10	5	0	5	288	260	Lost QF: Schwäbisch Hall Unicorns (13–38)
2022	GFL (North)	2nd	14–6	0.700	10	6	2	2	337	225	Lost QF: Allgäu Comets (10–14)
2023	GFL (North)	3rd	20–4	0.833	12	10	–	2	356	175	Won QF: Allgäu Comets (36–34 OT) Lost SF: Potsdam Royals (28–41)
2024	GFL (North)	3rd	14–10	0.583	12	7	–	5	252	215	Won QF @ Ravensburg Razorbacks (45–14) Lost SF @ Potsdam Royals (6–25)
2025	GFL (North)	5th	14–10	0.583	12	7	–	5	367	276	—
2026	GFL (North)	5th	8–16	0.333	12	4	–	8	270	421	—

- QF = Quarter finals.
- SF = Semi finals.
- GB = German Bowl

== Hall of Fame ==
The following players and coaches have been inducted into the club's hall of fame:

- 1997: (Germany) Gerald Meier
- 1999: (Germany) Olaf Müller
- 2001: (United States) Jerry Claiborne
- 2003: (Germany) Jörg Ottkowitz
- 2005: (Germany) Joachim Diederichs
- 2008: (Germany) Rico Trute
- 2010: (Canada) Adrian Rainbow
- 2012: (United States) Jon Horton
- 2014: (Germany) Steffen Dölger
- 2016: (United States) Matt Riazzi
- 2017: (Germany) Bastian Kypke
