= Schwäbisch Hall Unicorns =

German American football team

- Founded: 1983
- League: German Football League
- Based in: Schwäbisch Hall, Germany
- Stadium: Optima Sportpark, 4,180 capacity
- Colors: Green and White
- President: Jürgen Gehrke
- Head coach: Christian Rothe
- Championships: CEFL Bowl: 2021, 2022; German Bowl: 2011, 2012, 2017, 2018, 2022
- Cheerleaders: UNIXX
- Mascot: Corny
- Website: unicorns.de

The Schwäbisch Hall Unicorns are an American football team from Schwäbisch Hall, Germany founded in 1983.

The club's greatest successes were winning the southern division title in the German Football League in 2009 and in every season played since 2011 (as of 2021), and participated in every German Bowl held between 2011 and 2022 – except for 2013 and the 2020 season which was cancelled due to COVID-19, winning the title five times: in 2011, 2012, 2017, 2018 and in 2022. The club also made five losing appearances in the German Bowl, suffering defeat by record champion Braunschweig Lions in 2014, 2015, 2016 and 2019 and falling to the Dresden Monarchs in German Bowl XLII in 2021. Their 2011, 2017 and 2018 seasons also saw them post flawless perfect season records in the GFL on their way to championship rings. In 2016 and 2019 their only GFL losses came in the respective German Bowl at the hands of Braunschweig. In the Covid-truncated 2021 German Football League they also reached the German Bowl after posting a perfect regular season record (10–0) but lost again in the final, this time to the Dresden Monarchs. In 2021 the Unicorns also won their first ever European title, beating the Tyrol Raiders in the CEFL Bowl by a score of 22–16.

Previously, the only appearance in a national championship game the club has made was in 1997, when it lost the Junior Bowl to the youth team of the Berlin Adler.

== History ==
=== Early years ===
The club was founded on 9 November 1983, as the American football department of the TSG Schwäbisch Hall, which is still, as of 2014, the mother club of the Unicorns.

In the following year, the team entered in the central division of the 2nd Bundesliga, the second tier of American football in Germany, now the German Football League 2. At this level, the club quickly acclimatised, winning its division in 1986 and 1987. In 1986, the Stuttgart Scorpions were still the stronger side in the promotion round, winning both games and baring the Unicorns from moving one level up, but the year after the club managed to take up the Scorpions place in the American Football Bundesliga.

The team played at this level for the next three seasons, without ever qualifying for the postseason, before losing its league place in 1990 when the league was reduced from 26 to 16 clubs. The Unicorns found themselves back in the 2nd Bundesliga for the next three seasons, before suffering further relegation.

The side's absolute low came in 1995, when it had dropped to the tier-four Oberliga Baden Württemberg, but it quickly recovered, winning the league that season and earning promotion to the third tier. After another title, now in the Regionalliga Mitte, the team returned to the 2nd Bundesliga once more for the 1997 season.

=== Back to the first tier ===
In four seasons at this level, the team finished in the top four each year, culminating in a second place in 2000, which allowed the side to move up again because of two clubs withdrawing from the GFL. For the next seven seasons, the Unicorns reached the play-offs each year, with a semi final appearance in 2005, where it lost to the Braunschweig Lions, as its best result.

The 2008 season was a disappointment to the club, finishing fifth in its division and missing the postseason, but also staying well clear of relegation trouble. In 2009, the Unicorns were much improved, winning the southern division for the first time and missing out on a first-ever German Bowl appearance by a point, losing 21–22 to the Kiel Baltic Hurricanes. In 2010, the club came second in its division but lost to the Dresden Monarchs in the quarterfinals of the play-offs.

=== Championships and continued success ===
The team played a flawless regular season in 2011, winning every game, followed by beating the Berlin Adler in the quarter-finals and the Mönchengladbach Mavericks in the semifinals of the play-offs and advancing to the German Bowl for the first time, where they met the Kiel Baltic Hurricanes. The 33rd edition was the highest scoring German Bowl of all time, ending with a 48–44 victory for the Unicorns, which thereby ended an 18-year title drought for the south.

In 2012, the club once more won its division, reaching the German Bowl after victories over the Düsseldorf Panther and Berlin Adler in the quarter and semi finals of the play-offs. In a repeat of 2011 the club once more defeated the Kiel Baltic Hurricanes in the German Bowl. The 2013 season saw the club win a third consecutive division title but the team was unable to defend their national championship, being knocked out in the quarter-finals by the Berlin Adler.

The club took out the southern division title of the GFL once more in 2014 and defeated the Kiel Baltic Hurricanes 50–24 in the quarter-finals and the Dresden Monarchs 33–27 in the semi-finals of the play-offs to reach the 2014 German Bowl where it lost to the New Yorker Lions in a lopsided 47–9 where they only managed to score a field goal until well into the fourth quarter. The team won the southern division for a fifth consecutive time in 2015 and defeated the Hamburg Huskies in the quarter-finals and the Dresden Monarchs in the semi-finals of the play-offs, facing the New Yorker Lions once more in the German Bowl, which the Unicorns lost 31–41 in a much more closely fought contest than the previous year. 2015 also saw their first appearance in the BIG6 European Football League, where they advanced to the final before losing 24–14 in Eurobowl XXIX to host New Yorker Lions.

The 2016 season saw an unthreatened defense of the division championship with the Unicorns compiling a perfect season in the process under the direction of new head coach Jordan Neuman. However, the division title and home field advantages throughout the playoffs could only be clinched in the last game with a 35–28 win at Frankfurt against Universe. On the European stage, Hall saw their BIG6 campaign stopped at the hands of the Austrian Football League power Tirol Raiders that beat them in the group phase after an easy win over the Berlin Adler. The (GFL) post season began with an easy win over the Berlin Rebels (24–14) and continued – as the two years before – with a close fought match against the Dresden Monarchs. Despite a 21–7 lead going into halftime, the Unicorns only managed to put the game out of reach near the end ultimately prevailing 35–26 on a 100-yard kickoff return immediately following the Dresden field goal that had made it a close contest at 28–26. Thus Hall achieved the fifth bowl appearance in six years.

As of 2016, former Unicorn wide receiver Moritz Böhringer is the first and only European player to be drafted into the National Football League directly out of a European league.

In 2021 the Unicorns met the Tirol Raiders again. Since the BIG6 didn't exist anymore the two teams participated in the Central European Football League the new European top tournament and both teams made it to the bowl game. This time, the Unicorns managed to beat the Raiders and won their first European title. In the GFL, the team posted their fifth straight perfect regular season with a 10–0 record (the 2020 German Football League was not played due to Covid) in a season with a reduced schedule of only ten games instead of the usual 14. Beating their German Bowl rival Braunschweig in the quarterfinal in a game that opened in a sack by the Unicorns defense and saw an interception carried to a pick six in the opening drive by Italian-American Unicorns defender Cody Pastorino Hall defeated Braunschweig by 38–13 taking five turnovers from the Lions. The semifinal against the Potsdam Royals proved closer at 28–18 but its main importance was in the injuries to key players the Unicorns suffered - starting Quarterback Alexander Haupert (also the quarterback of the Germany national American football team) was out with a knee injury and questionable for the final while starting running back John Santiago tore his ACL and was out for the rest of the season. In German Bowl XLII Hall would face another "familiar face" in their semifinal opponents from the 2014, 2015, 2016, 2018 and 2019 seasons, the Dresden Monarchs. Haupert, playing despite his injury, was knocked out of the game with a broken clavicle early in the second quarter, requiring Reilly Hennessey, who had just led Parma Panthers to an Italian Bowl win that July, to step in under center in his first ever game in the German Football League. While the Unicorns led at the half 12–7 and once again had the turnover differential in their favor 2–1 their score early in the third quarter to make it 19–7 should prove their last and in the end Dresden won 28–19 with Hall failing to convert on a Field Goal attempt late in the game. Dresden thus celebrated their first playoff victory over the Unicorns since 2010, the first Championship for a team from the New States of Germany and dealt Hall their fifth German Bowl defeat in nine appearances and the first one not at the hands of Braunschweig. The Head Coach who led Dresden to their victory, Ulrich "Ulz" Däuber, was a Unicorns alumn himself, having played for them in the eighties and nineties and having been a coach in their youth system in the 1990s before an extended stint in the US. The Unicorns won the German Bowl XLIII against the Potsdam Royals.

== Honours ==
=== International ===
- Central European Football League
  - Champions: (2) 2021, 2022
- Eurobowl
  - Runners-up: 2015
- BIG6 European Football League
  - Participations: (2) 2015–2016
- EFL
  - Participations: (2) 2012, 2013

=== National ===
- German Bowl
  - Champions: (5) 2011, 2012, 2017, 2018, 2022
  - Runners-up: (6) 2014–2016, 2019, 2021, 2023
- GFL
  - Southern Division champions: (15) 2009, 2011–2019, 2021–2024, 2026
  - Play-off qualification: (24) 2001–2007, 2009–2019, 2021–2026
  - League membership: (28) 1988–1990, 2001–present
- GFL2
  - Central Division champions: 1986, 1987
- Junior Bowl
  - Champions: 2016
  - Runners-up: 1997, 2025, 2026

== German Bowl appearances ==
The club's appearances in the German Bowl:

Bowl	Date	Champions	Runners-Up	Score	Location	Attendance
XXXIII	October 8, 2011	Schwäbisch Hall Unicorns	Kiel Baltic Hurricanes	48–44	Magdeburg	11,711
XXXIV	October 13, 2012	Schwäbisch Hall Unicorns	Kiel Baltic Hurricanes	56–53	Berlin	11,242
XXXVI	October 11, 2014	New Yorker Lions	Schwäbisch Hall Unicorns	47–9	Berlin	12,531
XXXVII	October 10, 2015	New Yorker Lions	Schwäbisch Hall Unicorns	41–31	Berlin	12,051
XXXVIII	October 8, 2016	New Yorker Lions	Schwäbisch Hall Unicorns	31–20	Berlin	13,047
XXXIX	October 7, 2017	Schwäbisch Hall Unicorns	New Yorker Lions	14–13	Berlin	13,502
XL	October 13, 2018	Schwäbisch Hall Unicorns	Frankfurt Universe	21–19	Berlin	15,213
XLI	October 12, 2019	New Yorker Lions	Schwäbisch Hall Unicorns	10–7	Frankfurt	20,382
XLII	October 9, 2021	Dresden Monarchs	Schwäbisch Hall Unicorns	28–19	Frankfurt	14,378
XLIII	October 8, 2022	Schwäbisch Hall Unicorns	Potsdam Royals	44–27	Frankfurt	9,637
XLIV	October 14, 2023	Potsdam Royals	Schwäbisch Hall Unicorns	34–7	Essen	9,516

== European bowl appearances ==
Bowl	Date	Champions	Runners-Up	Score	Location	Attendance
Eurobowl XXIX	July 20, 2015	New Yorker Lions	Schwäbisch Hall Unicorns	24–14	Braunschweig	5,068
CEFL Bowl XV	June 26, 2021	Schwäbisch Hall Unicorns	Swarco Raiders Tirol	22–16	Innsbruck	2,500
CEFL Bowl XVI	June 25, 2022	Schwäbisch Hall Unicorns	Panthers Parma	42–17	Schwäbisch Hall	2,383

== Youth ==
The Unicorns are known for their youth programmes and a significant number of their top players including national team quarterback Marco Ehrenfried have started playing with the Unicorns for one of their youth teams. The Unicorns also founded the first American Football only Sportinternat (sport focused boarding school) in Germany dubbed the "Unicorns Academy" in cooperation with the Evangelisches Schulzentrum Michelbach in Michelbach an der Bilz near Schwäbisch Hall.

== Recent seasons ==
Recent seasons of the club:

Year	Division	Finish	Points	Pct.	Games	W	D	L	PF	PA	Postseason
2005	GFL (South)	2nd	13–7	0.650	10	6	1	3	292	256	Won QF: Dresden Monarchs (30–27) Lost SF: Braunschweig Lions (8–33)
2006	GFL (South)	3rd	15–9	0.625	12	7	1	4	383	271	Lost QF: Hamburg Blue Devils (13–34)
2007	GFL (South)	3rd	17–7	0.708	12	8	1	3	398	218	Lost QF: Berlin Adler (3–23)
2008	GFL (South)	5th	8–16	0.333	12	4	0	8	207	331	—
2009	GFL (South)	1st	17–3	0.850	10	8	1	1	326	205	Won QF: Assindia Cardinals (46–25) Lost SF: Kiel Baltic Hurricanes (21–22)
2010	GFL (South)	2nd	18–6	0.750	12	9	0	3	444	198	Lost QF: Dresden Monarchs (45–56)
2011	GFL (South)	1st	26–0	1.000	13^{†}	13	0	0	617	256	Won QF: Berlin Adler (53–27) Won SF: Mönchengladbach Mavericks (47–21) Won GB: Kiel Baltic Hurricanes (48–44)
2012	GFL (South)	1st	24–4	0.857	14	12	0	2	654	302	Won QF: Düsseldorf Panther (41–25) Won SF: Berlin Adler (38–21) Won GB: Kiel Baltic Hurricanes (56–53)
2013	GFL (South)	1st	23–5	0.821	14	11	1	2	548	223	Lost QF: Berlin Adler (13–42)
2014	GFL (South)	1st	24–4	0.857	14	12	0	2	653	357	Won QF: Kiel Baltic Hurricanes (50–24) Won SF: Dresden Monarchs (33–27) Lost GB: New Yorker Lions (9–47)
2015	GFL (South)	1st	26–2	0.929	14	13	0	1	685	234	Won QF: Hamburg Huskies (61–13) Won SF: Dresden Monarchs (41–34) Lost GB: New Yorker Lions (31–41)
2016	GFL (South)	1st	28–0	1.000	14	14	0	0	694	282	Won QF: Berlin Rebels (24–14) Won SF: Dresden Monarchs (35–26) Lost GB: New Yorker Lions (20–31)
2017	GFL (South)	1st	28–0	1.000	14	14	0	0	561	250	Won QF: Berlin Rebels (31–24) Won SF: Kiel Baltic Hurricanes (33–11) Won GB: New Yorker Lions (14–13)
2018	GFL (South)	1st	28–0	1.000	14	14	0	0	558	163	Won QF: Cologne Crocodiles (37–14) Won SF: Dresden Monarchs (23–7) Won GB: Frankfurt Universe (21–19)
2019	GFL (South)	1st	28–0	1.000	14	14	0	0	680	176	Won QF: Berlin Rebels (45–24) Won SF: Dresden Monarchs (30–13) Lost GB: New Yorker Lions (7–10)
2020	GFL (South)	No season played because of the COVID-19 pandemic									
2021	GFL (South)	1st	20–0	1.000	10	10	0	0	512	90	Won QF: New Yorker Lions (38–13) Won SF: Potsdam Royals (28–18) Lost GB: Dresden Monarchs (19–28)
2022	GFL (South)	1st	20–0	1.000	10	10	0	0	437	148	Won QF: Berlin Adler (35–21) Won SF: Allgäu Comets (33–8) Won GB: Potsdam Royals (44–27)
2023	GFL (South)	1st	18–6	0.750	12	9	–	3	397	244	Won QF: Berlin Rebels (17–7) Won SF: Dresden Monarchs (36–30) Lost GB: Potsdam Royals (7–34)
2024	GFL (South)	1st	18–6	0.750	12	9	–	3	367	319	Lost QF: Hildesheim Invaders (28–31)
2025	GFL (South)	4th	12–12	0.500	12	6	–	6	313	337	Lost QF: Potsdam Royals (25–42)
2026	GFL (South)	1st	24–0	1.000	12	12	–	0	515	177	Won QF: Düsseldorf Panther (23–20); Lost SF: Potsdam Royals (12–39)

- QF = Quarter finals.
- SF = Semi finals.
- GB = German Bowl
- ^{†} The final game of the 2011 season against the Marburg Mercenaries was not played because of heavy rain on game day.

== Notable players ==
The team is notable for the long bonds between (former) players and the team with import players such as Nick Alfieri (who also runs a YouTube channel about his experiences in Germany) returning year after year and many members of the coaching staff - including head coach Jordan Neuman being former Unicorns players.

- David Bada, defensive lineman assigned to the Washington Football Team in 2020 as a member of the International Player Pathway Program.
- Moritz Böhringer, drafted in the sixth round of the 2016 NFL draft by the Minnesota Vikings. Played for the Unicorns before and after his NFL stints.
