= Dresden Monarchs =

American football team from Germany

- Founded: 1992; 34 years ago
- League: German Football League
- Based in: Dresden, Germany
- Stadium: Heinz-Steyer-Stadion Rudolf Harbig Stadion
- Colors: Gold and Navy
- President: Sören Glöckner
- Head coach: Greg Seamon
- Manager: Jörg Dreßler
- Championships: German Bowl: 2021, 2026
- Cheerleaders: Blue Pearls
- Mascot: King Louie (Lion)
- Website: dresden-monarchs.de

The Dresden Monarchs are an American football team from Dresden, Germany. They have been a member of the first tier German Football League since 2002 and play in its Northern Division. In 2021 they were GFL champions after having won German Bowl XLII. In January 2023 the Monarchs named longtime NFL Coach Paul Alexander as their head coach.

The club reached the German Bowl for the first time in 2013, where it lost to the Braunschweig Lions by a single point. The 2021 season saw their first division title in the first tier German Football League when they placed first in the North Division with a record of nine victories, one defeat in the regular season. In German Bowl XLII the Monarchs defeated the Schwäbisch Hall Unicorns 28–19 to claim their first ever title.

== History ==
=== Starting out ===
The Dresden Monarchs were founded by Ulrich Kramer in January 1992 and entered in the Aufbauliga Ost the following year, the lowest possible league in the region.

The Monarchs, in the following years, gradually worked their way up through the league system, winning the league they played in every season from 1996 to 1999. In 1999, a second title in the tier-three Regionalliga Nordost allowed the club promotion to the northern division of the 2nd Bundesliga, now the GFL2.

After three seasons at this level, Dresden won its division in 2002, winning all ten games, and went on to defeat the Kiel Baltic Hurricanes in two games in the promotion round by a combined score of 100–0. Ironically enough, one of the players on the field for Kiel during their humiliating defeat was Alexander Graf von Perponcher-Sedlnitzky who would go on to become the stadium announcer for the Dresden Monarchs later on.

=== German Football League playoff contender ===
Promoted to the German Football League, the GFL, the club became an instant play-off contender, reaching the semifinals in 2004, where it lost to the Braunschweig Lions. After four consecutive play-off qualifications, the club had a difficult 2007 season. With only one win and eleven defeats in the regular season, the Monarchs had to enter the relegation round, but were able to overcome the Hamburg Eagles and thereby defended their place in the GFL.

The club returned to its better performances after 2007, reaching the play-offs once more every year. A second semifinal qualification, in 2010, ended in defeat to eventual German Bowl winners Kiel Baltic Hurricanes.

In 2011, the club narrowly missed out on play-off qualification, finishing fifth in the league. The first (and as of 2021 only) time they did not have a postseason (including promotion/relegation games) since their 2002 entry into the top tier. In 2012, the club came third in the northern division of the GFL and qualified for the play-offs where they were knocked out by the Kiel Baltic Hurricanes in the semi-finals.

=== Number two in the North and failing to beat Schwäbisch Hall ===
The 2013 season became the club's best up to that point, finishing second in its division and reaching the German Bowl after play-off victories at home over the Munich Cowboys and Berlin Adler. Ultimately the Braunschweig Lions who had already bested them twice during the regular season were too much to overcome in a 35–34 nailbiter decided by the lone turnover late in the game when Running back Trevar Deed (one of the most statistically productive players in that position in GFL history in his most productive GFL season) fumbled the ball. The one point winning margin was also the result of otherwise very "clutch" wide receiver and placekicker Jan Hilgenfeld missing a Point after Touchdown kick, which Hilgenfeld himself pointed out in a post game interview to take the blame off Deed.

In 2014, the club took part in a new European competition, the BIG6 European Football League, which consisted of three teams from Germany, two from Austria and one from Switzerland, the clubs being Berlin Adler, New Yorker Lions, Dresden Monarchs, Raiffeisen Vikings Vienna, Swarco Raiders Tirol and the Calanda Broncos. The two best teams of this competition advanced to the Eurobowl XXVIII, with Dresden knocked out in the group stage. In the GFL the club finished once more in second place in the North Division in 2014 and defeated the Marburg Mercenaries 42–22 at home in the quarter-finals of the play-offs but lost in the semi-finals on the road to the Schwäbisch Hall Unicorns who would in turn lose the German Bowl to Braunschweig.

The team finished second in the northern division of the GFL in 2015 and defeated the Stuttgart Scorpions at home in the quarter-finals of the play-offs but again lost in the road to the Schwäbisch Hall Unicorns in the semi-finals of the play-offs. Schwäbisch Hall would go on to lose the German Bowl against the New Yorker Lions as they had already done the previous year. Prior to the 2016 season many players left the team or announced their retirement from Football and the first game of the Dresden Monarchs 2016 season was a 21–21 draw against the Berlin Rebels in Berlin. However, the team led by Quarterback Brandon Connette ultimately recovered and proved one of the most statistically efficient passing offenses in the league, losing only two games (on the road in Kiel and Braunschweig) and tying their home game against Braunschweig before defeating an overmatched Saarland Hurricanes squad in the quarterfinals before once more going on the road to the Schwäbisch Hall Unicorns. Like the two previous seasons, the Southern champions proved too tough a nut to crack for the Monarchs and the 35–26 defeat ended the season that ultimately had very similar results to the two previous seasons, all ending as the second placed team in the North falling in the semifinals to Hall.

2017 saw the Monarchs fall to third place in the North with a 10–4 record behind the Kiel Baltic Hurricanes who had posted the same record but had beaten Dresden twice. Having to go on the road in the playoffs, Dresden fell to the Frankfurt Universe 26–16 in their first "one and done" playoff appearance since 2009 (barring the 2011 season in which they failed to make the playoffs altogether).

In 2018 the Monarchs returned to the pattern of previous years, even posting the same 11–2–1 record as Braunschweig, but while holding Braunschweig to a tie on the road, they failed to win their home game against the Lions thus again placing second in the North due to the head-to-head tiebreaker. In the playoffs Dresden once more took care of business in their quarterfinals at home before being bested on the road by Schwäbisch Hall, again a repeat of the pattern of previous years. The fact that Braunschweig also failed to advance to the final and Schwäbisch Hall won it all that year was only small consolation for the once again foiled championship dreams of the Dresden squad.

In 2019 Dresden, posting a 10–4 record (three of their regular season defeats coming on the road – the lone home loss was to Braunschweig) finishing second in the North once again ended their title hopes with a semifinal defeat on the road in Schwäbisch Hall as had become almost tradition by now.

=== COVID-19 and first Championship ===
Whatever plans Dresden may have had for the 2020 season ultimately never materialized as a microscopic virus, called SARS-CoV-2, which causes the deadly respiratory disease COVID-19, forced the AFVD to delay and ultimately cancel the 2020 season. As case numbers decreased in the summer of 2020 and to give the long suffering fans at least one home game in the year, Dresden held an exhibition match against the Wroclaw Panthers (who, unlike Dresden, were able to play in their domestic league). However, as Dresden played with only a "rump team" almost entirely devoid of European or American "imports" and had had much less opportunity to train (let alone play against other teams) than the Polish champion of 2016, 2017, 2019 and ultimately also 2020, they were overmatched and fell 48–14. The match was held in front of a sold-out crowd as capacity was capped at 1,500 due to Covid.

The German Football League finally returned for play for the 2021 season and it should prove an even more successful one for Dresden than 2013 had been. While the lingering effects of COVID-19 – several teams were unable to start full contact team training as early in the preseason as they would've liked – made for a few upsets, the founding of the European League of Football, which included many players who had played in the GFL as recently as 2019 threw the German Football landscape into disarray as both leagues competed for media and fan attention as well as sponsorship money and player talent. The GFL North ultimately only had six teams that year (instead of the usual eight) and Dresden lost their opening game on the road 48–41 to the Cologne Crocodiles despite that team having lost quite a few players to the crosstown Centurions. However, the Dresden squad soon shook whatever had ailed them in that season opener and took revenge on Cologne the following week, by beating them at home with a convincing 54–34. Two weeks later, the Monarchs traveled to Braunschweig and delivered the first defeat (35–27) for the Lions since the 2018 season and Dresden's first victory in Braunschweig since 2015. The rest of the regular season saw Dresden defeat all challengers, including Braunschweig once more (this time in Dresden) ultimately resulting in Dresden clinching the division title and home field advantage throughout the playoffs with a record of 9–1. The division lead was theoretically still up for grabs in the last home game of the regular season against the Potsdam Royals (who placed second) who could've equalized winning percentages at 8–2 and pulled ahead on the head-to-head tiebreaker if they'd won by more than 16 points, but Potsdam's decision makers apparently had no intention of even trying as they mostly let the backups play in a lopsided 63–7 road loss in Dresden to close out the regular season. Dresden thus placed ahead of Braunschweig in the regular season standings for the first time since 2012. In the quarter-final, the Allgäu Comets were sent packing back to Bavaria with a score of 50–13 while the Saarland Hurricanes didn't even manage to get on the scoreboard in the 37–0 defeat they experienced in the last Monarchs game at Heinz Steyer Stadion prior to its renovation which is scheduled to take until 2023. The Monarchs will hold their home games for the upcoming 2022 season at their training facilities at Bärnsdorfer Straße, potentially also (one or two games) at Rudolf Harbig Stadion. The Monarchs thus reached the German Bowl for the second time after 2013 and played the GFL South Division Champion Schwäbisch Hall Unicorns on October 9, 2021, at Frankfurt's Waldstadion to crown the 42nd German champion in American football in German Bowl XLII. In a game in which Dresden struggled to turn its offensive dominance into points during the first half, Dresden ultimately had the stronger finish and beat Schwäbisch Hall 28–19 after having trailed 12–7 at half time, to win the first Championship of any American football team from former East Germany.

== Home Fields ==
The Monarchs started out playing at Bärnsdorfer Straße, a former velodrome (the former cycling track is still visible but hasn't been used for that purpose in decades) in the Äußere Neustadt borough of Dresden. The field is still their training grounds and used for virtually all youth games and as a "diversion grounds" for the senior team if Heinz Steyer Stadion is unavailable (for example during the 2013 European floods). The administrative headquarters of the club as well as facilities for team meetings or events is also located at those grounds. The field is an artificial turf playing surface with permanent American football markings and Field Goals – a rarity in Germany where most teams have to train and play on fields otherwise used for association football (soccer).

Heinz Steyer Stadion (sometimes referred to as "Heinz Field" by fans) has been the home ground for most games in their GFL era. After the 2021 season ongoing renovations will necessitate the Monarchs using a different stadium until probably 2023.

Usually one game per season is also played at Rudolf Harbig Stadion, the most modern and highest capacity stadium in Dresden. Due to the prestige of the larger stadium, this is often the best attended Monarchs home game of the season.

The Monarchs have a strong fan base and usually place in the top three of attendance figures in the league together with the Schwäbisch Hall Unicorns and the Braunschweig Lions. In part as a result of that and due to home field advantage in the playoffs being determined by the better seed, (Note: and due to the domination of the North for virtually the entirety of Dresden playoffs participations, northern home teams are highly favored to win their playoff games) the Monarchs have never lost a playoffs home game. After the 2021 season their playoff home record stands at 9–0 while they've gone 3–14 in playoff road games (not counting the neutral site German Bowl in which they are 1–1). Their regular season record also tilts in favor of home field advantage but far less drastically so.

== Honours ==
- German Bowl
  - Champion: 2021, 2026
  - Runners-up: 2013, 2024, 2025
- GFL
  - Northern Division Champion: 2021, 2026
  - Play-off qualification: (20) 2003–2006, 2008–2010, 2012–2021, 2023–2026
  - League membership: (23) 2003–present
- GFL2
  - Northern Division Champion: 2002 (promotion to GFL)

== German Bowl appearances ==
The club appeared in the German Bowl (now GFL Bowl) five times:

Bowl	Date	Champions	Runners-Up	Score	Location	Attendance
XXXV	October 12, 2013	**Braunschweig Lions**	Dresden Monarchs	35–34	Berlin	12,157
XLII	October 9, 2021	**Dresden Monarchs**	Schwäbisch Hall Unicorns	28–19	Frankfurt	14,378
2024	October 12, 2024	**Potsdam Royals**	Dresden Monarchs	27–21	Essen	9,712
2025	October 11, 2025	**Potsdam Royals**	Dresden Monarchs	33–23	Dresden	22,016
2026	October 3, 2026	**Dresden Monarchs**	Potsdam Royals	27–19	Dresden	25,016

- Champions in **bold**.

== Recent seasons ==
Recent seasons of the club:

Year	Division	Finish	Points	Pct.	Games	W	D	L	PF	PA	Postseason
2005	GFL (North)	3rd	14–10	0.583	12	7	0	5	306	290	Lost QF: Schwäbisch Hall Unicorns (27–30)
2006	GFL (North)	3rd	11–13	0.458	12	5	1	6	200	318	Lost QF: Stuttgart Scorpions (27–47)
2007	GFL (North)	6th	2–22	0.083	12	1	0	11	169	440	**Won** RR: Hamburg Eagles (28–24 & 19–13)
2008	GFL (North)	4th	12–12	0.500	12	6	0	6	192	272	Lost QF: Marburg Mercenaries (21–32)
2009	GFL (North)	3rd	10–10	0.500	10	5	0	5	258	250	Lost QF: Marburg Mercenaries (63–64)
2010	GFL (North)	3rd	12–12	0.500	12	6	0	6	248	253	**Won** QF: Schwäbisch Hall Unicorns (56–45) Lost SF: Kiel Baltic Hurricanes (0–14)
2011	GFL (North)	5th	12–16	0.429	14	6	0	8	405	237	—
2012	GFL (North)	3rd	20–8	0.714	14	10	0	4	481	297	**Won** QF: Rhein-Neckar Bandits (31–19) Lost SF: Kiel Baltic Hurricanes (14–35)
2013	GFL (North)	2nd	22–6	0.786	14	11	0	3	513	254	**Won** QF: Munich Cowboys (59–14) **Won** SF: Berlin Adler (32–21) Lost GB: New Yorker Lions (34–35)
2014	GFL (North)	2nd	16–8	0.667	12	8	0	4	426	269	**Won** QF: Marburg Mercenaries (42–22) Lost SF: Schwäbisch Hall Unicorns (27–33)
2015	GFL (North)	2nd	20–4	0.833	12	10	0	2	498	170	**Won** QF: Stuttgart Scorpions (55–14) Lost SF: Schwäbisch Hall Unicorns (34–41)
2016	GFL (North)	2nd	22–6	0.786	14	10	2	2	708	345	**Won** QF: Saarland Hurricanes (43–7) Lost SF: Schwäbisch Hall Unicorns (26–35)
2017	GFL (North)	3rd	20–8	0.714	14	10	0	4	585	337	Lost QF: Frankfurt Universe (16–26)
2018	GFL (North)	2nd	23–5	0.821	14	11	1	2	507	287	**Won** QF: Allgäu Comets (51–19) Lost SF: Schwäbisch Hall Unicorns (7–23)
2019	GFL (North)	2nd	20–8	0.714	14	10	0	4	418	189	**Won** QF: Marburg Mercenaries (39–22) Lost SF: Schwäbisch Hall Unicorns (13–30)
2020	GFL (North)	No season played because of the COVID-19 pandemic									
2021	GFL (North)	1st	18–2	0.900	10	9	0	1	444	243	**Won** QF: Allgäu Comets (50–13) **Won** HF: Saarland Hurricanes (37–0) **Won** GB: Schwäbisch Hall Unicorns (28–19)
2022	GFL (North)	5th	8–12	0.400	10	4	0	6	265	257	—
2023	GFL (North)	2nd	20–4	0.833	12	10	–	2	488	280	**Won** QF: Saarland Hurricanes (45–38) Lost SF: Schwäbisch Hall Unicorns (30–36)
2024	GFL (North)	2nd	20–4	0.833	12	10	–	2	363	156	**Won** QF: Straubing Spiders (35–6) **Won** HF: Hildesheim Invaders (27–13) Lost GB: Potsdam Royals (21–27)
2025	GFL (North)	2nd	22–2	0.917	12	11	–	1	505	240	**Won** QF: Pforzheim Wilddogs (41–22) **Won** HF: Ravensburg Razorbacks (31–24) Lost GB: Potsdam Royals (23–33)
2026	GFL (North)	1st	24–0	1.000	12	12	–	0	452	153	**Won** QF: Munich Cowboys (61–14) **Won** HF: Pforzheim Wilddogs (36–7) **Won** GB: Potsdam Royals (27–19)

- RR = Relegation round.
- QF = Quarter finals.
- SF = Semi finals.
- GB = German Bowl

== Rivalries ==
Having played uninterrupted at the highest tier of German Football since the 2003 season a few matchups have heated up to fierce rivalries on and off the field. However, fan violence is unheard of and even during heated matchups with fierce rivals that have playoff implications there are often joint tailgate parties organized by supporters of Dresden and their opponent.

Some enduring rivalries even date to the era when Dresden played in the second tier GFL2 (1999–2002). For example, the Berlin Adler were relegated to the second tier after the 1997 season and managed to return to the top flight a year ahead of Dresden after the 2001 season. Another rivalry began precisely in the promotion/relegation round of the 2002 season when the Kiel Baltic Hurricanes were sent down to the second tier by a combined score of 100–0 in the two-game series. Dresden running up the score in front of a record crowd of over 8000 spectators during the second leg of the fixture added bitterness to the rivalry and Dresden-Kiel matchups have often been particularly fierce on the field, particularly when held at Kiel's aptly named diversion field "de:Moorteichwiese" (literally bog-pond-meadow) which is often waterlogged in inclement weather. Ironically one of the Kiel players during the 2002 matchups, Alexander Graf von Perpondcher-Sedlnitzky, is now Stadium announcer for Dresden and known for his emotional style.

Due to the proximity of Berlin to Dresden (roughly 200 kilometers via Bundesautobahn 13 or roughly two hours via the Berlin–Dresden railway) games between the two teams are usually well attended by fans of the other. While Berlin had been dominant early in the rivalry, Dresden became stronger as Berlin entered a slump culminating with their relegation in 2017. The rivalry includes stories such as the "cow incident" (Note: coming home from their upset quarter final victory over the Schwäbisch Hall Unicorns heavily inebriated Berlin Adler players had tried and failed to take a plastic cow into their team bus breaking off a leg in the process. This was covered by local and national media) ahead of the 2013 semifinal which was mocked by Dresden supporters making mooing noises during the game and a similar cow to the one involved in the incident being placed next to the field by the club. Some Dresden supporters also take to mocking the Berlin mascot ("Adler" is the German word for "eagle") by displaying rubber chicken affixed to their outfits with a hangman's knot during games between the two teams.

Dresden also enjoys a fierce but friendly rivalry with the Braunschweig Lions which has heated up since the 2013 season when the end of a 2009–2012 Braunschweig slump coincided with Dresden's strongest season to date. Dresden lost all three matchups against Braunschweig that year, including German Bowl XXXV by 35–34. Every season between then and the COVID-caused interruption except 2017 has seen Dresden and Braunschweig place second and first respectively. In 2017 Dresden's other rival, Kiel Baltic Hurricanes took second place and thereby home field advantage in the playoffs from them by placing just ahead of them on the head-to-head tiebreaker. 2021 was the first year since 2012 that Dresden placed ahead of Braunschweig and also the first time Dresden won the GFL North Division. As of 2021 the head-to-head record between Braunschweig and Dresden is 11 victories Dresden, 23 victories Braunschweig and 2 draws overall with a combined score of 1243–806 in favor of the Lions. The two teams met in the postseason twice with Braunschweig knocking them out 34–20 in the 2004 semifinal and the aforementioned German Bowl XXXV loss of Dresden to Braunschweig in 2013.

Due to "Interconference Games" last being held in 2011 GFL South teams can only meet GFL North teams in the playoffs and due to the North South disparity Dresden has not lost a playoff game at home in its entire history. However, road games are a different story and in the 2010s the Schwäbisch Hall Unicorns proved to be the end of the line for Dresden's championship hopes five times. Dresden finally reversed their fortunes in German Bowl XLII when they beat Schwäbisch Hall for the first time since 2010. Including German Bowl XLII the overall playoff head to head between the two teams is three victories for Dresden (2004, 2010 & 2021) and six for Schwäbisch Hall (2005, 2014, 2015, 2016, 2018 & 2019). With the exception of the neutral site game German Bowl XLII, the Unicorns enjoyed home field advantage in each of those matchups. The Monarchs also played the Unicorns twice in the regular season in 2007 under the "Interconference Games" rule then in place. Schwäbisch Hall won both games and Dresden only narrowly avoided relegation that year after placing last in the GFL North with a record of 1–11. Despite the lopsided win–loss record the overall score is comparatively close at 376–304 in favor of Schwäbisch Hall. The current head coach of the Dresden Monarchs, Ulrich "Ulz" Däuber is a former player for the Unicorns and was also part of their youth coaching system before an extended stint in the US.
