= German Bowl =

Annual final of the German Football League

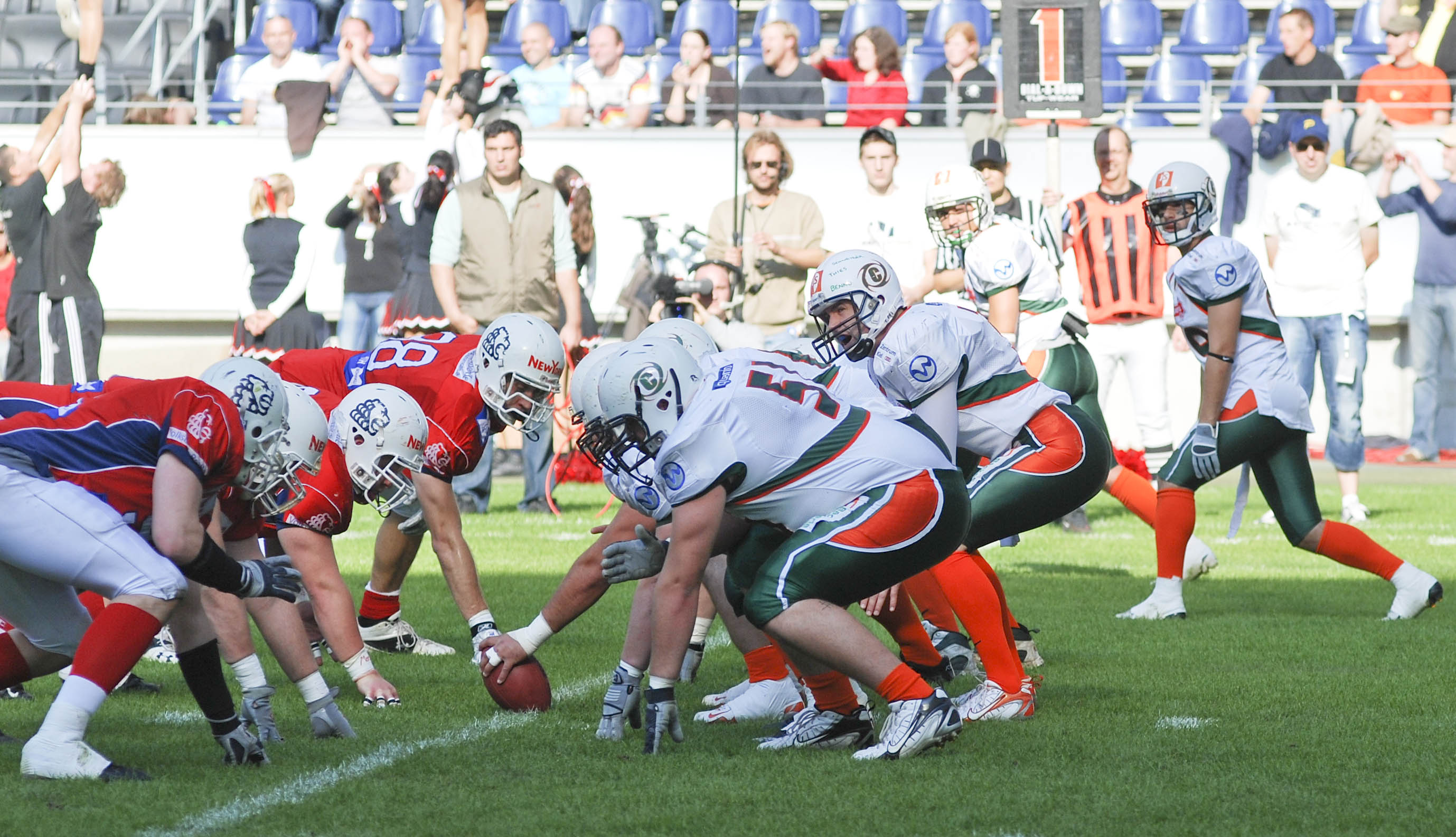
- German Bowl XXX in 2008, Braunschweig Lions vs Kiel Baltic Hurricanes
- In operation: 1979–present
- Number of bowls: 44
- Most bowl appearances: Braunschweig Lions (18)
- Most bowl championships: Braunschweig Lions (12)
- First championship game: Frankfurt, 10 November 1979
- Last championship game: Rudolf-Harbig-Stadion, Dresden, October 2025
- Current champion: Dresden Monarchs (2nd title)
- Website: germanbowl.de

The German Bowl (since 2023 GFL Bowl) is the annual national championship game in the sport of American football in Germany. It is contested by the two best teams of the German Football League.

The Braunschweig Lions are the record winners of the German Bowl, with 12 successful participations out of 18 overall. The Düsseldorf Panther and the Berlin Adler both have six titles to their name, but Berlin has the best win–loss record of all clubs, 75 percent. Altogether, as of 2026, 13 clubs have won a German Bowl, while a further four clubs have reached the German Bowl once but lost their sole appearance (Stuttgart Scorpions, Badener Greifs, Marburg Mercenaries and Frankfurt Universe). The most-played match up in the history of the game is the Braunschweig Lions versus the Hamburg Blue Devils, having been played six times, last in 2005. The matchup between the Schwäbisch Hall Unicorns and the Braunschweig Lions has occurred five times - all in the span from 2014 to 2019. German Bowl XIX to German Bowl XXX (inclusive) all had appearances by the Braunschweig Lions (later to be renamed for sponsorship reasons to "New Yorker Lions") for twelve consecutive appearances over the space of over a decade.

Apart from the German Bowl, a Junior Bowl has also been contested in Germany since 1982. A Ladies Bowl was introduced in 1990. Other, related, national championship games in Germany include the German Flag Bowl (est. 2000), German Junior Flag Bowl (1999) and a German Indoor Flag Bowl (2000).

== History ==
In 1979, the American Football Bundesliga, later to be renamed the German Football League, was formed, consisting of six clubs, the Frankfurter Löwen, Ansbach Grizzlies, Düsseldorf Panther, Munich Cowboys, Berlin Bears and Bremerhaven Seahawks. Of those six, the top two teams would contest the first ever German Bowl on 10 November 1979.

The early years of the league were dominated by two teams, Frankfurt and Ansbach, who met each other in the first three editions of the German Bowl. Of those, Frankfurt won the first two and Ansbach the last. The era of the Frankfurter Löwen came to an end soon afterwards and the club went defunct in the mid-1980s, while the Ansbach Grizzlies continued to be an outstanding team, playing in all of the first eight German Bowls. Unlike the first season, play-off semi-finals were played in 1980 and 1981 to determine the two German Bowl contestants. From 1982, the play-offs were enlarged to include a quarter-final round as well.

The 1982 season saw Ansbach repeat its title, this time against the Cologne Crocodiles. After that, the era of the Düsseldorf Panther versus Ansbach Grizzlies rivalry began, with the two teams meeting in the next four finals. Of those, the team from Düsseldorf won the 1983, 1984 and 1986 editions, while the Grizzlies earned their third championship in 1985. With the 1986 final, the golden age of the Ansbach Grizzlies ended and the club disappeared from the top level altogether by 1991. From 1986, a wild-card round was introduced as well, taking the number of teams in the play-offs to twelve.

The 1987 German Bowl saw two completely new teams compete against each other, the Badener Greifs making their only appearance in the championship game to date, while the Berlin Adler won their first of what would be six national championships by 2010. In 1988, Red Barons Cologne defeated the Düsseldorf Panther in the final, while, from 1989 onwards, the Berlin Adler became the first team to win three championships in a row, all against teams from Cologne. After the 1990 season, the play-offs were reduced to eight teams again, dropping the wild-card round, a system still in place as of 2010.

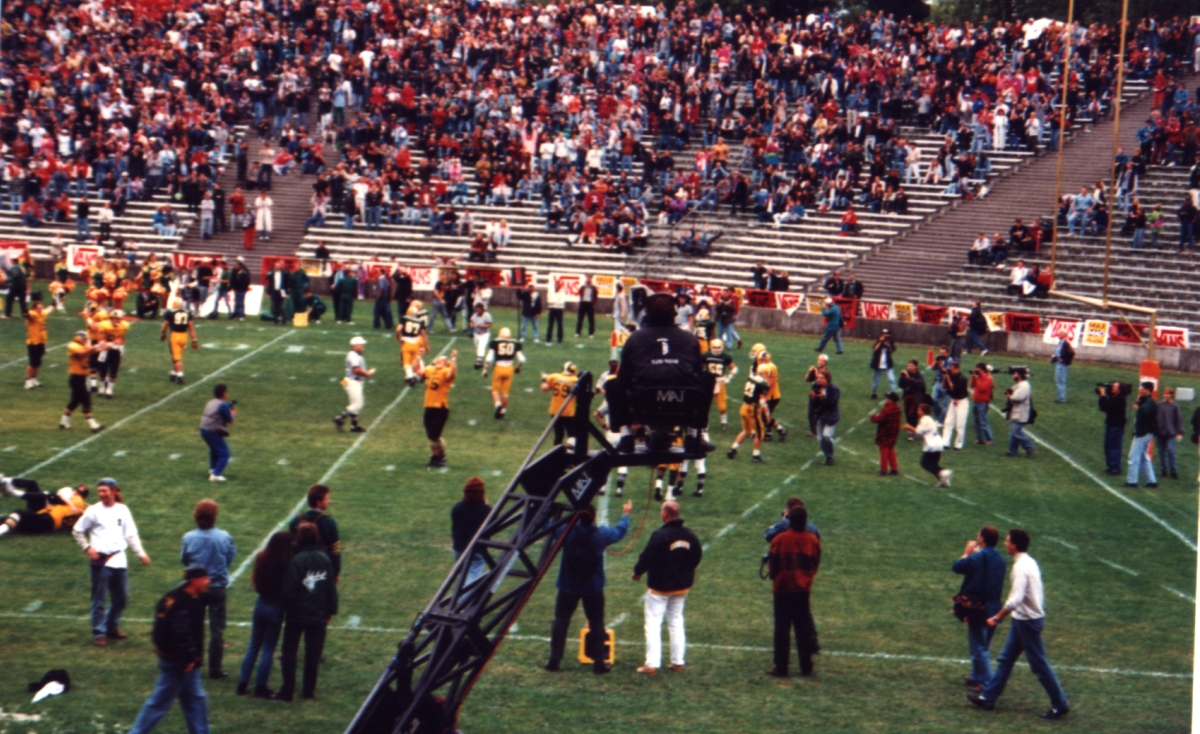
The Munich Cowboys celebrating their German Bowl triumph in 1993.

The Panther earned their fourth title in 1992, defeating the Munich Cowboys, which, in the following year, won the championship themselves, against Cologne Crocodiles, who suffered their fourth defeat in their fourth German Bowl. Munich's title in 1993 was to be the last occasion for the next twelve years that a team from the South would reach the final, and the last time until 2011 that a team from the South would win the championship. The Bundesliga and the German Bowl were from then on dominated by the North.

In 1994 and 1995, the Düsseldorf Panther once more won the German Bowl, with the second title won against a new force in the game in Germany, the Hamburg Blue Devils. In 1996, the Blue Devils then reversed their previous misfortune and defeated the Panthers in the final.

The most dominant era of any team in the sport in Germany begun in 1997, when the Braunschweig Lions reached and won the German Bowl for the first time. The Lions would play in every one of the next twelve German Bowls until 2008, and win seven of those. Their first title, in 1997, was won against the Cologne Crocodiles, who now had the unenviable record of five losses in five German Bowl appearances. The following six seasons, the final was contested by the Lions and the Blue Devils on five occasions, with the Lions winning in 1998 and 1999, while the Blue Devils won in 2001, 2002 and 2003. Only in 2000 did neither of those two win the Bowl. Instead, the Cologne Crocodiles finally reversed their fortunes and won a championship in their sixth attempt. In between, in 1999, the Bundesliga was renamed to German Football League.

Braunschweig lost a fifth final in a row in 2004, when the Berlin Adler won their first title in 13 years. After that, the Braunschweig Lions set a new record, winning four German Bowls in a row, beating four different teams in the finals. In 2005, the Blue Devils were once more the opposition, followed by two southern teams, the Marburg Mercenaries in 2006 and the Stuttgart Scorpions in 2007. The seventh title for the Lions came in 2008, against the new force of the Kiel Baltic Hurricanes.

Kiel also played in the 2009 final, losing to the Berlin Adler, before finally being successful in 2010 and securing their first title against the same team.

German Bowl XXXIII was held on 8 October 2011 at the MDCC-Arena in Magdeburg. The 2011 season saw the end of an 18-year title drought for the south, when the Schwäbisch Hall Unicorns defeated Kiel 48–44 to carry off the national championship for the first time. The Unicorns repeated their 2011 title in 2012 in the highest-scoring German Bowl to date winning 56–53 on a late field goal, while the 2013 title went to a resurgent and renamed Braunschweig, now playing as the New Yorker Lions in a close 35–34 victory against the Dresden Monarchs in their first German Bowl appearance. Dresden missed an extra-point attempt after their first touchdown and went on to lose on a late fumble, the only turnover of the game, while driving towards good field position for a field goal. The Lions won their ninth German Bowl in 2014 with the highest-ever winning margin, defeating the Schwäbisch Hall Unicorns 47–9. Schwäbisch Hall scored no points in this game after a field goal on their first possession until the fourth quarter when most of the Braunschweig starters, including MVP quarterback Casey Therriault, were already off the field. The Lions repeated their 2014 success against the Unicorns in 2015, winning 41–31.

== North–South disparity ==
Success in American football in Germany and at the German Bowl differs hugely between the clubs from the northern and the southern division, with the south only winning ten German Bowls and the north the remaining 32 (through XLII). Similarly (through XLII), southern clubs have only made 26 appearances in the Bowl, while northern clubs have appeared 58 times. After the first three German Bowls, the final was only contested by two southern clubs one other time; in the 2018 edition when another Frankfurt based team - Frankfurt Universe - did what had only been achieved before by the long since defunct Frankfurter Löwen - reaching a German Bowl against another GFL South representative - The Schwäbisch Hall Unicorns. Between the end of the golden era of the Ansbach Grizzlies in 1986 and the rise of the Schwäbisch Hall Unicorns (who first reached the German Bowl in 2011), southern clubs have only made five appearances in the championship game of which only one was successful (the Munich Cowboys in 1993). After first reaching the German Bowl in 2011, the Schwäbisch Hall Unicorns made all (as of 2021) subsequent German Bowls except the 2013 edition where they were upset by the Berlin Adler in the quarterfinal of the playoffs. As the 2018 German Bowl was an all Southern affair, balancing out the all Northern German Bowl 2013, the divisions have achieved parity in representation at the final for the period beginning in 2011. However, in terms of wins the North still has the edge even for the 2011-2019 period as Schwäbisch Hall won it all four times in that decade whereas Braunschweig's New Yorker Lions won the Bowl five times in the same period.

== German Bowls ==
The German Bowls since 1979:

=== By game ===
Bowl	Date	Champions	Runners-up	Score	Location	Attendance
I	November 10, 1979	**Frankfurter Löwen**	Ansbach Grizzlies	14–8	Frankfurt	5,000
II	July 30, 1980	**Frankfurter Löwen** (2)	Ansbach Grizzlies (2)	21–12	Frankfurt (2)	7,000
III	August 5, 1981	**Ansbach Grizzlies** (3)	Frankfurter Löwen (3)	27–6	Cologne	11,000
IV	November 2, 1982	**Ansbach Grizzlies** (4)	Cologne Crocodiles	12–6	Essen	10,000
V	September 25, 1983	**Düsseldorf Panther**	Ansbach Grizzlies (5)	22–7	Nuremberg	7,000
VI	October 13, 1984	**Düsseldorf Panther** (2)	Ansbach Grizzlies (6)	27–13	Essen (2)	10,000
VII	November 12, 1985	**Ansbach Grizzlies** (7)	Düsseldorf Panther (3)	14–7	Cologne (2)	9,000
VIII	July 27, 1986	**Düsseldorf Panther** (4)	Ansbach Grizzlies (8)	27–14	Würzburg	10,000
IX	October 11, 1987	**Berlin Adler**	Badener Greifs	37–12	Berlin	14,000
X	October 15, 1988	**Red Barons Cologne**	Düsseldorf Panther (5)	25–20	Berlin (2)	11,000
XI	October 21, 1989	**Berlin Adler** (2)	Red Barons Cologne (2)	30–23	Nuremberg (2)	10,500
XII	October 20, 1990	**Berlin Adler** (3)	Cologne Crocodiles (2)	50–38	Düsseldorf	10,000
XIII	October 5, 1991	**Berlin Adler** (4)	Cologne Crocodiles (3)	22–21	Hamburg	13,000
XIV	October 3, 1992	**Düsseldorf Panther** (6)	Munich Cowboys	24–23	Hanover	8,750
XV	September 25, 1993	**Munich Cowboys** (2)	Cologne Crocodiles (4)	42–36 *	Munich	10,100
XVI	September 17, 1994	**Düsseldorf Panther** (7)	Berlin Adler (5)	27–17	Hanau	8,862
XVII	September 16, 1995	**Düsseldorf Panther** (8)	Hamburg Blue Devils	17–10	Braunschweig	12,125
XVIII	October 5, 1996	**Hamburg Blue Devils** (2)	Düsseldorf Panther (9)	31–12	Hamburg (2)	19,700
XIX	October 4, 1997	**Braunschweig Lions**	Cologne Crocodiles (5)	26–23	Hamburg (3)	14,800
XX	October 3, 1998	**Braunschweig Lions** (2)	Hamburg Blue Devils (3)	20–14	Hamburg (4)	22,100
XXI	October 9, 1999	**Braunschweig Lions** (3)	Hamburg Blue Devils (4)	25–24	Hamburg (5)	30,400
XXII	October 7, 2000	**Cologne Crocodiles** (6)	Braunschweig Lions (4)	31–29	Braunschweig (2)	20,312
XXIII	October 6, 2001	**Hamburg Blue Devils** (5)	Braunschweig Lions (5)	31–13	Hanover (2)	23,193
XXIV	October 12, 2002	**Hamburg Blue Devils** (6)	Braunschweig Lions (6)	16–13	Braunschweig (3)	21,097
XXV	October 11, 2003	**Hamburg Blue Devils** (7)	Braunschweig Lions (7)	37–36 *	Wolfsburg	20,517
XXVI	October 9, 2004	**Berlin Adler** (6)	Braunschweig Lions (8)	10–7	Braunschweig (4)	17,200
XXVII	October 8, 2005	**Braunschweig Lions** (9)	Hamburg Blue Devils (8)	31–28	Hanover (3)	19,512
XXVIII	October 7, 2006	**Braunschweig Lions** (10)	Marburg Mercenaries	31–13	Braunschweig (5)	15,897
XXIX	October 6, 2007	**Braunschweig Lions** (11)	Stuttgart Scorpions	27–6	Stuttgart	8,152
XXX	September 29, 2008	**Braunschweig Lions** (12)	Kiel Baltic Hurricanes	20–14	Frankfurt (3)	16,177
XXXI	October 3, 2009	**Berlin Adler** (7)	Kiel Baltic Hurricanes (2)	28–21	Frankfurt (4)	14,234
XXXII	October 9, 2010	**Kiel Baltic Hurricanes** (3)	Berlin Adler (8)	17–10	Frankfurt (5)	11,121
XXXIII	October 8, 2011	**Schwäbisch Hall Unicorns**	Kiel Baltic Hurricanes (4)	48–44	Magdeburg	11,711
XXXIV	October 13, 2012	**Schwäbisch Hall Unicorns** (2)	Kiel Baltic Hurricanes (5)	56–53	Berlin (3)	11,242
XXXV	October 12, 2013	**Braunschweig Lions** (13)	Dresden Monarchs	35–34	Berlin (4)	12,157
XXXVI	October 11, 2014	**Braunschweig Lions** (14)	Schwäbisch Hall Unicorns (3)	47–9	Berlin (5)	12,531
XXXVII	October 10, 2015	**Braunschweig Lions** (15)	Schwäbisch Hall Unicorns (4)	41–31	Berlin (6)	12,051
XXXVIII	October 8, 2016	**Braunschweig Lions** (16)	Schwäbisch Hall Unicorns (5)	31–20	Berlin (7)	13,047
XXXIX	October 7, 2017	**Schwäbisch Hall Unicorns** (6)	Braunschweig Lions (17)	14–13	Berlin (8)	13,502
XL	October 13, 2018	**Schwäbisch Hall Unicorns** (7)	Frankfurt Universe	21–19	Berlin (9)	15,213
XLI	October 12, 2019	**Braunschweig Lions** (18)	Schwäbisch Hall Unicorns (8)	10–7	Frankfurt (6)	20,382
XLII	October 9, 2021	**Dresden Monarchs** (2)	Schwäbisch Hall Unicorns (9)	28–19	Frankfurt (7)	14,378
XLIII	October 8, 2022	**Schwäbisch Hall Unicorns** (10)	Potsdam Royals	44–27	Frankfurt (8)	9,637
GFL Bowl (Note: Name changed due to trademark disputes)	October 14, 2023	**Potsdam Royals** (2)	Schwäbisch Hall Unicorns (11)	34–7	Essen (3)	9,516
2024	October 12, 2024	**Potsdam Royals** (3)	Dresden Monarchs (3)	27–21	Essen (4)	9,712
2025	October 11, 2025	**Potsdam Royals** (4)	Dresden Monarchs (4)	33–23	Dresden (1)	22,016
2026	October 3, 2026	**Dresden Monarchs** (5)	Potsdam Royals (5)	27–19	Dresden (2)	25,016

Champions in bold
* indicates overtime wins

=== By team ===
App.	Team	Wins	Losses	Winning percentage	Season(s)^{†}
18	Braunschweig Lions^{‡}	12	6	.667	**1997**, **1998**, **1999**, 2000, 2001, 2002, 2003, 2004, **2005**, **2006**, **2007**, **2008**, **2013**, **2014**, **2015**, **2016**, 2017, **2019**
11	Schwäbisch Hall Unicorns	5	6	.455	**2011**, **2012**, 2014, 2015, 2016, **2017**, **2018**, 2019, 2021, **2022**, 2023
9	Düsseldorf Panther	6	3	.667	**1983**, **1984**, 1985, **1986**, 1988, **1992**, **1994**, **1995**, 1996
8	Berlin Adler	6	2	.750	**1987**, **1989**, **1990**, **1991**, 1994, **2004**, **2009**, 2010
8	Hamburg Blue Devils	4	4	.500	1995, **1996**, 1998, 1999, **2001**, **2002**, **2003**, 2005
8	Ansbach Grizzlies	3	5	.375	1979, 1980, **1981**, **1982**, 1983, 1984, **1985**, 1986
6	Cologne Crocodiles	1	5	.167	1982, 1990, 1991, 1993, 1997, **2000**
5	Potsdam Royals	3	2	.600	2022, **2023**, **2024**, **2025**, 2026
5	Dresden Monarchs	2	3	.400	2013, **2021**, 2024, 2025, **2026**
5	Kiel Baltic Hurricanes	1	4	.200	2008, 2009, **2010**, 2011, 2012
3	Frankfurter Löwen	2	1	.667	**1979**, **1980**, 1981
2	Red Barons Cologne	1	1	.500	**1988**, 1989
2	Munich Cowboys	1	1	.500	1992, **1993**
1	Frankfurt Universe	0	1	.000	2018
1	Stuttgart Scorpions	0	1	.000	2007
1	Marburg Mercenaries	0	1	.000	2006
1	Badener Greifs	0	1	.000	1987

- ^{†} **Bold** denotes German Bowl victory.
- ^{‡} Known as the New Yorker Lions from 2011 to 2025.

=== By city ===
The host cities of the German Bowl were:

**City**	**State**	**No. hosted**
Berlin	Berlin	9
Frankfurt	Hesse	8
Braunschweig	Lower Saxony	5
Hamburg	Hamburg	5
Essen	North Rhine-Westphalia	4
Hanover	Lower Saxony	3
Nuremberg	Bavaria	2
Cologne	North Rhine-Westphalia	2
Dresden	Saxony	2
Magdeburg	Saxony-Anhalt	1
Stuttgart	Baden-Württemberg	1
Wolfsburg	Lower Saxony	1
Hanau	Hesse	1
Munich	Bavaria	1
Düsseldorf	North Rhine-Westphalia	1
Würzburg	Bavaria	1
