= List of American football teams in Germany =

This is a list of teams playing American football in Germany (Version: 2010):

== 1st Bundesliga ==
=== GFL North ===
- Berlin Rebels
- Berlin Adler
- Cologne Crocodiles
- Dresden Monarchs
- Hamburg Huskies
- Hildesheim Invaders
- Kiel Baltic Hurricanes
- New Yorker Lions

=== GFL South ===
- Munich Cowboys
- Allgäu Comets
- Marburg Mercenaries
- Ingolstadt Dukes
- Saarland Hurricanes
- Samsung Frankfurt Universe
- Schwäbisch Hall Unicorns
- Stuttgart Scorpions

== 2nd Bundesliga ==
=== GFL 2 North ===
- Assindia Cardinals
- Bonn Gamecocks
- Düsseldorf Panther
- Langenfeld Longhorns
- Lübeck Cougars
- Paderborn Dolphins
- Potsdam Royals
- Rostock Griffins

=== GFL 2 South ===
- Albershausen Crusaders
- Fursty Razorbacks
- Gießen Golden Dragons
- Kirchdorf Wildcats
- Nurnberg Rams
- Ravensburg Razorbacks
- Wiesbaden Phantoms

== Regionalliga ==
=== Regionalliga North ===
==== Group North ====
- Hamburg Huskies
- Hamburg Blue Devils
- Norderstedt Nordic Wolves
- Kiel Baltic Hurricanes II
- St. Pauli Buccaneers

==== Group South ====
- Osnabrück Tigers
- Hildesheim Invaders
- Göttingen Generals
- Arminia Spartans

=== Regionalliga East ===
- Berlin Adler
- Frankfurt Red Cocks
- Cottbus Crayfish
- Leipzig Lions
- Tollense Sharks
- Potsdam Royals

=== Regionalliga West ===
- Bochum Cadets
- Paderborn Dolphins
- Dortmund Giants
- Bielefeld Bulldogs
- Remscheid Amboss

=== Regionalliga Central ===
==== Group North ====
- Frankfurt Universe
- Montabaur Fighting Farmers
- Jenaer Hanfrieds
- Frankfurt Pirates
- Giessen Golden Dragons

==== Group South ====
- Stuttgart Silver Arrows
- Ravensburg Razorbacks
- Badener Greifs
- Freiburg Sacristans

=== Regionalliga South ===
- Munich Cowboys II
- Munich Rangers
- Fursty Razorbacks
- Passau Pirates
- Burghausen Crusaders
- Würzburg Panthers
- Landsberg Express
- Nürnberg Rams

== Oberliga ==
=== Oberliga Schleswig-Holstein/Hamburg ===
- Elmshorn Fighting Pirates
- Hamburg Pioneers
- Lübeck Seals
- Hamburg Ravens
- Flensburg Sealords

=== Oberliga Niedersachsen/Bremen ===
- Braunschweig Lions II
- Bremerhaven Seahawks
- Bremen Firebirds
- Hannover Grizzlies

=== Oberliga East ===
- Chemnitz Crusaders
- Berlin Thunderbirds
- Spandau Bulldogs
- Rostock Griffins
- Wernigerode Mountain Tigers
- Radebeul Suburban Foxes

=== Oberliga NRW ===
- Aachen Vampires
- Münster Mammuts
- Cologne Falcons II
- Düsseldorf Bulldozer
- Gelsenkirchen Devils
- Solingen Paladins

=== Oberliga Hessen/Rheinland-Pfalz/Saar/Thüringen ===
- Bad Kreuznach Thunderbirds
- Heiligenstein Crusaders
- Kassel Titans
- Trier Stampers
- Nauheim Wild Boys
- Mainz Golden Eagles
- Erfurt Indigos

=== Oberliga Baden-Württemberg ===
- Danube Hammers
- Crailsheim Titans
- Pforzheim Wilddogs
- Albershausen Crusaders
- Heidelberg Bulls
- Kuchen Mammuts
- Ludwigsburg Bulldogs

=== Bayernliga ===
- Königsbrunn Ants
- Burghausen Crusaders
- München Rangers
- Straubing Spiders
- Ingolstadt Dukes
- Franken Timberwolves

== Verbandsliga ==
=== Verbandsliga Schleswig-Holstein/Hamburg ===
- Hamburg Black Swans
- Hamburg Blue Devils II
- Lübeck Cougars II
- Neumünster Castle Demons
- St. Pauli Buccaneers

=== Verbandsliga Niedersachsen/Bremen ===
==== Group North ====
- Jade Bay Buccaneers
- Nienburg Country Taurus
- Ritterhude Badgers
- Zeven Northern United

==== Group South ====
- Schaumburg Rangers
- Wolfenbüttel Black Wolves
- Wolfsburg Blue Wings
- Hannover Stampeders

=== Verbandsliga East ===
- Eberswalder Warriors
- Capital Colts
- Berlin Bullets
- Erkner Razorbacks
- Halle Falken

=== Verbandsliga NRW ===
- Ahlen/Hamm Aces
- Cologne Crocodiles
- Niederrhein Grizzlies
- Oberberg Bandits
- Sauerland Mustangs

=== Landesliga Central ===
- Fulda Saints
- Koblenz Huskies
- Langen Knights
- Neuwied Raiders
- Wetzlar Wölfe

=== Verbandsliga Baden-Württemberg ===
- Aalen Limes Praetorians
- Backnang Wolverines
- Bad Mergentheim Wolfpack
- Böblingen Bears
- Ostalb Highlanders
- Fellbach Warriors
- Heilbronn Salt Miners
- Pforzheim Panthers
- Heidelberg Hunters

=== Verbandsliga Bayern ===
==== Group North ====
- Bamberg Bears
- Würzburg Panthers
- Erlangen Sharks
- Albertshofen Roughnecks
- Schweinfurt Ball Bearings

==== Group South ====
- Augsburg Raptors
- Kümmerbruck Red Devils
- Landsberg X-press
- Rosenheim Rebels

== Landesliga ==
=== Landesliga NRW - Group West ===
- Aachen Düren Demons
- Düsseldorf Bulldozer
- Kleve Conquerors
- Kreis Heinsberg Bisons
- Mülheim Shamrocks
- Neuss Frogs

=== Landesliga NRW - Group East ===
- Ahlen/Hamm Aces
- Bielefeld Bulldogs II
- Sauerland Mustangs
- Siegen Sentinels
- Solingen Paladins II
- Wipperfürth Phoenix
- Wuppertal Greyhounds

=== Landesliga Baden-Württemberg ===
- Biberach Beavers
- Kornwestheim Cougars
- Rottenburg Red Knights
- Lahr Miners
- Schwäbisch Hall Unicorns II
- Rhein-Neckar Bandits II
