= 2015 German Football League =

- Logo of the German Bowl XXXVII
- League: German Football League
- Sport: American football
- Duration: 18 April–10 October 2015
- Teams: 15
- Promoted to GFL: Frankfurt Universe Hildesheim Invaders
- Relegated to GFL 2: Franken Knights

Regular season
- GFL North champions: New Yorker Lions
- GFL North runners-up: Dresden Monarchs
- GFL South champions: Schwäbisch Hall Unicorns
- GFL South runners-up: Allgäu Comets

German Bowl XXXVII
- Champions: New Yorker Lions
- Runners-up: Schwäbisch Hall Unicorns

GFL seasons
- ← 2014 2016 →

The 2015 German Football League season was the thirty seventh edition of the top-level American football competition in Germany and sixteenth since the renaming of the American football Bundesliga to German Football league.

The regular season started on 18 April and finished on 5 September 2015, followed by the play-offs. The season culminated in the German Bowl XXXVII, held on 10 October 2015 in Berlin, the fourth consecutive time and the sixth overall for the championship decider to be held in the German capital. The championship was won by the New Yorker Lions who defeated the Schwäbisch Hall Unicorns 41–31 in a repeat of the 2014 final which the Lions had won by a record margin of 38 points.

== Modus ==
Location of teams in the German Football League 2015

During the regular season each club plays all other clubs in its division twice, home and away, resulting in each team playing, nominally, 14 regular season games. The northern division in 2015 however consisted of only seven teams, resulting in only twelve regular season games per club in this division. There are no games between clubs from opposite divisions, interconference games having been abolished after the 2011 season when the GFL was expanded from 14 to 16 teams.

The best four teams in each division qualify for the play-offs where, in the quarter-finals, teams from opposite divisions play each other, whereby the better placed teams have home advantage. The first placed team plays the fourth placed from the other division and the second placed the third placed team. From the semi-finals onwards teams from the same division can meet again.

The eighth placed team in each division entered a two-leg play-off with the winner of the respective division of the German Football League 2, the second tier of the league system in Germany. The winners of this contest qualified for the GFL for the following season. In case of a GFL division consisting of less than eight clubs no play-off was necessary.

== Season overview ==
The 2015 season saw one promoted team, the Hamburg Huskies, which filled the vacant spot created by the withdrawal of the Hamburg Blue Devils shortly before the start of the 2014 season. No team was relegated from the GFL at the end of the 2014 season as the Franken Knights defended their league place in the south in the promotion-relegation round against the Kirchdorf Wildcats. Shortly before the start of the 2015 season the Cologne Falcons withdrew from the northern division for financial reasons, leaving the division to play with seven clubs for the second consecutive season.

Five of the eight teams qualified for the play-offs in 2014 did so again in 2015. Of the three clubs that had not qualified in the previous season the Hamburg Huskies made their first-ever play-off appearance in their first-ever GFL season while the Allgäu Comets qualified for the first time since 1988. The third team, the Saarland Hurricanes, made their second play-off appearance, having previously qualified in 2005. Of the three teams not qualified for the 2015 play-offs that had played in the 2014 post season the Marburg Mercenaries saw the end of their run of eleven consecutive play-off appearances.

At the bottom end of the league, no team was relegated from the northern division of the GFL while the champions of the northern division of the GFL 2, the Hildesheim Invaders, earned the right to compete in the league in 2016. In the southern division the Franken Knights voluntarily withdrew to the GFL 2 after coming last in 2014 and 2015 and only winning a single league game in this two seasons. The champions of the southern division of the GFL 2, the Frankfurt Universe, was thereby directly promoted without the need to play the two promotion-relegation games against the eighth placed GFL South team. Both promotions are however subject to licence applications and approval.

In the quarter-finals of the play-offs the two top teams of each division advanced to the semi-finals. With the Allgäu Comets, second in the south, defeating the Kiel Baltic Hurricanes two southern teams advanced to the semi-finals for the first time since 2009. In the previous five seasons only the southern division champions had survived the quarter-finals except 2013 when the four semi-finalists all came from the northern division. In the semi-finals the two division champions won their home games, the first time since 2007 that all quarter- and semi-finals were won by the home team. The 2015 German Bowl was a repeat of the 2014 final, seeing the New Yorker Lions defeat the Schwäbisch Hall Unicorns 41–31.

== League tables ==
=== GFL ===
The league tables of the two GFL divisions:

GFL North
P	Team	G	W	T	L	PF	PA	PCT
1	New Yorker Lions	12	11	0	1	483	148	0.917
2	Dresden Monarchs	12	10	0	2	498	170	0.833
3	Kiel Baltic Hurricanes	12	9	0	3	469	251	0.750
4	Hamburg Huskies	12	5	0	7	225	309	0.417
5	Berlin Rebels	12	4	0	8	296	337	0.333
6	Berlin Adler	12	2	0	10	145	469	0.167
7	Düsseldorf Panther	12	1	0	11	87	519	0.083

GFL South
P	Team	G	W	T	L	PF	PA	PCT
1	Schwäbisch Hall Unicorns	14	13	0	1	685	234	0.929
2	Allgäu Comets	14	12	0	2	527	218	0.857
3	Stuttgart Scorpions	14	10	0	4	524	281	0.714
4	Saarland Hurricanes	14	8	0	6	419	342	0.571
5	Munich Cowboys	14	7	0	7	312	380	0.500
6	Marburg Mercenaries	14	3	0	11	286	484	0.214
7	Rhein-Neckar Bandits	14	2	0	12	171	493	0.143
8	Franken Knights	14	1	0	13	126	618	0.071

=== GFL2 ===
The league tables of the two GFL 2 divisions:

GFL2 North
P	Team	G	W	T	L	PF	PA	PCT
1	Hildesheim Invaders	14	10	1	3	573	401	0.750
2	Lübeck Cougars	14	9	1	4	547	448	0.679
3	Paderborn Dolphins	14	8	0	6	455	322	0.571
4	Cologne Crocodiles	14	8	0	6	379	329	0.571
5	Potsdam Royals	14	7	0	7	369	321	0.500
6	Bonn Gamecocks	14	5	1	8	374	489	0.393
7	Bielefeld Bulldogs^{#}	14	5	1	8	377	460	0.393
8	Elmshorn Fighting Pirates	14	2	0	12	320	624	0.143

GFL2 South
P	Team	G	W	T	L	PF	PA	PCT
1	Frankfurt Universe	14	14	0	0	601	204	1.000
2	Ingolstadt Dukes	14	11	0	3	476	182	0.786
3	Kirchdorf Wildcats	14	9	0	5	481	309	0.643
4	Nürnberg Rams	14	8	0	6	466	397	0.571
5	Wiesbaden Phantoms	14	7	0	7	291	369	0.500
6	Holzgerlingen Twister^{‡}	14	3	0	11	214	435	0.214
7	Darmstadt Diamonds^{‡}	14	3	0	11	158	487	0.214
8	München Rangers^{‡}	14	1	0	13	255	559	0.071

- ^{#} The Bielefeld Bulldogs applied for an additional place in the GFL2 for 2016 which was available because there was one team promoted to the GFL North but no team relegated from the division. Bielefeld and was later awarded the available place in the GFL 2 for 2016.
- ^{‡} The Holzgerlingen Twister withdrew from the GFL 2 to the Regionalliga at the end of the 2015 season. Originally the Darmstadt Diamonds retained their GFL 2 place but later declined and opted to play in the Regionalliga in 2016. The München Rangers therefore were awarded the available place in the GFL 2 for 2016.

=== Key ===
GFL: Qualified for play-offs GFL 2: Promoted	Relegation play-offs Promotion play-offs	Relegated

== Play-offs ==
The quarter-finals of the 2015 play-offs were played on 19 and 20 September, the semi-finals 26 September and the German Bowl on 10 October 2015. The German Bowl was held at the Friedrich-Ludwig-Jahn-Sportpark in Berlin:

Quarterfinals
N1	New Yorker Lions	57
S4	Saarland Hurricanes	14
S2	Allgäu Comets	39
N3	Kiel Baltic Hurricanes	27
S1	Schwäbisch Hall Unicorns	61
N4	Hamburg Huskies	13
N2	Dresden Monarchs	55
S3	Stuttgart Scorpions	14

Semifinals
N1	New Yorker Lions	42
S2	Allgäu Comets	21
S1	Schwäbisch Hall Unicorns	41
N2	Dresden Monarchs	34

German Bowl
N1	New Yorker Lions	41
S1	Schwäbisch Hall Unicorns	31
