= 2014 German Football League =

- Logo of the German Bowl XXXVI
- League: German Football League
- Sport: American football
- Duration: 26 April–11 October 2014
- Teams: 15
- Promoted to GFL: Hamburg Huskies
- Relegated to GFL2: none

Regular season
- GFL North champions: New Yorker Lions
- GFL North runners-up: Dresden Monarchs
- GFL South champions: Schwäbisch Hall Unicorns
- GFL South runners-up: Stuttgart Scorpions

German Bowl XXXVI
- Champions: New Yorker Lions
- Runners-up: Schwäbisch Hall Unicorns

GFL seasons
- ← 2013 2015 →

The 2014 German Football League season was the thirty sixth edition of the top-level American football competition in Germany and fifteenth since the renaming of the American football Bundesliga to German Football league.

The regular season started on 26 April and finished on 14 September 2014, followed by the play-offs. The season culminated in the German Bowl XXXVI, staged on 11 October 2014 in Berlin, the third consecutive time and the fifth overall for the championship decider to be held in the German capital.

The German Bowl was won by the New Yorker Lions, a club from the city of Braunschweig who defeated the Schwäbisch Hall Unicorns by a record score of 47–9. It was the club's ninth title overall and second consecutive one.

== Modus ==
Location of teams in the German Football League 2014

During the regular season, each club played all other clubs in its division twice, home and away, resulting in each team playing, nominally, 14 regular season games. However, in 2014, the northern division consisted of only seven teams, resulting in only twelve regular season games per club in this division. There were no games between clubs from opposite divisions, interconference games having been abolished after the 2011 season when the GFL was expanded from 14 to 16 teams.

The best four teams in each division qualified for the play-offs where, in the quarter-finals, teams from opposite divisions played each other, whereby the better placed teams had home advantage. The first placed team played the fourth placed from the other division and the second placed the third placed team. From the semi-finals onwards teams from the same division could meet again.

The eighth placed team in each division entered a two-leg play-off with the winner of the respective division of the German Football League 2, the second tier of the league system in Germany. The winners of this contest qualified for the GFL for the following season. In case of a GFL division consisting of less than eight clubs no play-off was necessary.

== Season overview ==
The 2014 season saw one promoted team, the Allgäu Comets, which replaced the relegated Wiesbaden Phantoms. The withdrawal of the Hamburg Blue Devils three month before the start of the 2014 season left the northern division to play with seven clubs.

No team was relegated from the GFL at the end of the 2014 season as the Franken Knights defended their league place in the south in the promotion-relegation round against the Kirchdorf Wildcats. Shortly before the start of the 2015 season however the Cologne Falcons withdrew from the northern division for financial reasons, leaving the division to play with seven clubs for the second consecutive season. The Hamburg Huskies were promoted to the GFL for 2015 after winning the northern division of the GFL2 and taking up the vacant spot created by the withdrawal of the Hamburg Blue Devils.

Six of the eight teams qualified for the play-offs in 2013 did so again in 2014. Only the Rhein Neckar Bandits and the Berlin Adler missed out on post season play compare to the previous year while the Cologne Falcons and the Stuttgart Scorpions returned to the play-offs, with the former making their second and the later their eighteenth appearance. The Marburg Mercenaries held the longest consecutive play-off run of the qualified clubs, having qualified every season since 2004.

In the quarter-finals of the play-offs the two division champions and the northern runners-up advanced to the semi-finals, alongside the third-placed northern team, the Cologne Falcons, who defeated the southern runners-up Stuttgart Scorpions. In the semi-finals the two division champions won their home games, whereby the Schwäbisch Hall Unicorns narrowly defeated the previous seasons losing German Bowl finalist Dresden Monarchs. In the German Bowl XXXVI the New Yorker Lions then defeated Schwäbisch Hall in front of 12,500 spectators by the greatest-ever winning margin in the history of the German Bowl, 47–9.

In the relegation play-offs between the last-placed southern team, the Franken Knights, and the winner of the GFL2 South, the Kirchdorf Wildcats, Franken won the first leg at home 50–22 and the return game 42–36, thereby retaining their league place. The northern division saw no relegation play-offs as it played with seven instead of the nominal eight teams in 2014 and thereby allowed the GFL2 North winner, the Hamburg Huskies, direct promotion.

== League tables ==
=== GFL ===
The league tables of the two GFL divisions:

GFL North
P	Team	G	W	T	L	PF	PA	PCT
1	New Yorker Lions	12	12	0	0	547	126	1.000
2	Dresden Monarchs	12	8	0	4	426	269	0.667
3	Cologne Falcons	12	7	0	5	345	352	0.583
4	Kiel Baltic Hurricanes	12	7	0	5	330	280	0.583
5	Berlin Adler	12	6	0	6	321	285	0.500
6	Berlin Rebels	12	2	0	10	174	495	0.167
7	Düsseldorf Panther	12	0	0	12	181	517	0.000

GFL South
P	Team	G	W	T	L	PF	PA	PCT
1	Schwäbisch Hall Unicorns	14	12	0	2	653	357	0.857
2	Stuttgart Scorpions	14	12	0	2	560	477	0.857
3	Marburg Mercenaries	14	9	0	5	476	431	0.643
4	Munich Cowboys	14	8	0	6	454	453	0.571
5	Allgäu Comets	14	6	0	8	464	442	0.429
6	Saarland Hurricanes	14	6	0	8	426	432	0.429
7	Rhein-Neckar Bandits	14	3	0	11	447	560	0.214
8	Franken Knights	14	0	0	14	388	716	0.000

Source: football-aktuell.de, GFL.info

=== GFL2 ===
The league tables of the two GFL2 divisions:

GFL2 North
P	Team	G	W	T	L	PF	PA	PCT
1	Hamburg Huskies	14	11	1	2	461	308	0.821
2	Lübeck Cougars	14	9	1	4	573	478	0.679
3	Cologne Crocodiles	14	8	0	6	489	402	0.571
4	Bielefeld Bulldogs	14	7	0	7	411	399	0.500
5	Hildesheim Invaders	14	6	1	7	451	469	0.464
6	Bonn Gamecocks	14	6	1	7	364	343	0.464
7	Troisdorf Jets^{#}	14	6	0	8	441	434	0.429
8	Elmshorn Fighting Pirates^{#}	14	1	0	13	236	593	0.071

GFL2 South
P	Team	G	W	T	L	PF	PA	PCT
1	Kirchdorf Wildcats	14	12	1	1	311	154	0.893
2	Wiesbaden Phantoms	14	8	1	5	233	214	0.607
3	Frankfurt Universe	14	8	0	6	289	222	0.571
4	Nürnberg Rams	14	8	0	6	364	316	0.571
5	Holzgerlingen Twister	14	7	0	7	326	294	0.500
6	Ravensburg Razorbacks^{‡}	14	5	0	9	319	324	0.357
7	Darmstadt Diamonds^{‡}	14	5	0	9	183	260	0.357
8	Frankfurt Pirates	14	2	0	12	168	409	0.143

- ^{#} The Elmshorn Fighting Pirates received the additional place in the GFL2 for 2015 which was available because the Hamburg Huskies were promoted to the GFL North but no team relegated from the division. The Troisdorf Jets had declined to apply to remain in the league.
- ^{‡} The Darmstadt Diamonds remained in the GFL2 after the Ravensburg Razorbacks voluntarily withdrew from the league.

=== Key ===
GFL: Qualified for play-offs GFL2: Promoted	Relegation play-offs Promotion play-offs	Relegated

== Play-offs ==
The quarter-finals of the 2014 play-offs were played on 20 and 21 September, the semi-finals on 27 September and the German Bowl on 11 October 2014. The German Bowl was held at the Friedrich-Ludwig-Jahn-Sportpark in Berlin: Schwäbisch Hall who had been upset by the Berlin Adler in the quarter-final the previous season this time took care of business at home and beat the Kiel Baltic Hurricanes in the quarter-final before dealing the Dresden Monarchs a defeat in the semifinals, putting the post-season head to head between the two teams at 2–2 (Dresden had knocked Hall out in the QF in 2004&2010 while Hall had prevailed in 2005). This would be the beginning of a pattern for the two teams with Dresden being knocked out in semifinals on the road in Schwäbisch Hall in 2015, 2016, 2018 and 2019. However, while the Unicorns had had a flawless 2–0 record in their prior German Bowl appearances, their first matchup against Braunschweig in the Championship Game would prove their first defeat. The Lions won their 9th German Bowl and managed to play a perfect season.

Quarterfinals
N1	New Yorker Lions	68
S4	Munich Cowboys	28
S2	Stuttgart Scorpions	28
N3	Cologne Falcons	33
S1	Schwäbisch Hall Unicorns	50
N4	Kiel Baltic Hurricanes	24
N2	Dresden Monarchs	42
S3	Marburg Mercenaries	22

Semifinals
N1	New Yorker Lions	52
N3	Cologne Falcons	3
S1	Schwäbisch Hall Unicorns	33
N2	Dresden Monarchs	27

German Bowl
N1	New Yorker Lions	47
S1	Schwäbisch Hall Unicorns	9
