= Darmstadt Diamonds =

- Founded: 1985
- League: Oberliga (4th level)
- Based in: Darmstadt, Germany
- Arena: Stadion am Böllenfalltor
- Colors: Blue and White
- President: Karl-Heinz-Isselmann
- Head coach: Andreas Hock
- Championships: Junior Bowl: 1995, 2001
- Website: www.darmstadt-diamonds.de

The Darmstadt Diamonds are an American football team from Darmstadt, Germany.

The club has spent six seasons in the German Football League, the GFL, from 1990 to 1992 and again from 2006 to 2008, reaching the play-offs on two occasions. The Diamonds have had much greater success at junior level, having won the German Junior Bowl on two occasions. They are currently situated in the Oberliga the fourth tier in Germany.

== History ==
The club was formed in September 1985.

The Diamonds entered league football in 1986, joining the Regionalliga Mitte, followed by joining the Verbandsliga Hessen in 1988. After league championships in 1987 and 1988 the side achieved promotion to the 2nd American Football Bundesliga, now the GFL2, where it played in the now defunct central division.

After winning its division in its first season in the league, Darmstadt earned promotion to the American Football Bundesliga, the predecessor of the GFL, for 1990. The club came second in its division in its first season and qualified for the play-offs but lost to the Noris Rams in the opening round. The club declined after this first season and, by 1992, was relegated again.

The next four seasons were spent in the 2nd Bundesliga again, where the Diamonds did not come close to promotion again but instead was relegated in 1996. The club was now back in the Regionalliga Mitte for three seasons, where it had started a decade before but managed to win the league in 1999 and earned the right to return to the second tier.

In the next six seasons, Darmstadt's performance varied greatly but culminated in a division title in 2005 that allowed it to return to Germany's highest league, now renamed GFL, for a second stint. Once more it showed its best performance in its first season there, finishing fourth and qualifying for the play-offs once more. In the first round the club was drawn against the Braunschweig Lions, the most dominating club in league history, and lost 79–0. In its next two GFL seasons, the club only won one game all up, against the Saarland Hurricanes in 2007, which saved the Diamonds from relegation that year. In 2008, the side performed even worse, losing eleven out of twelve games and only drawing once, against the Cologne Falcons. Darmstadt had to face the Plattling Black Hawks in the promotion-relegation round and lost both games there, too, condemning the club to relegation.

Back in the GFL 2 the club achieved average results for 2009 and 2010 but came close to promotion once more in 2011. The side finished on equal points in second place with the Rhein-Neckar Bandits and the Holzgerlingen Twister behind champions Franken Knights. The final placings in the league had to be decided by the games played between the three clubs, in which the Bandits had the best record and earned promotion while the Diamonds had the worst ended up in fourth place.

The following season, 2012, the club came last in the GFL 2 southern division and was relegated from the league. The 2013 season saw the club rebound, winning the Regionalliga Mitte without defeat and returning to the GFL 2 for 2014. Originally relegated at the end of the 2015 season after finishing seventh the club was offered to retain their league place after the withdrawal of the Holzgerlingen Twister but opted to step down to the Regionalliga Mitte for 2016.

The Diamonds junior team has historically performed much better than the senior side, having reached the German Junior Bowl on seven occasions and won two of those.

== Honours ==
- GFL
  - League membership: (6) 1990–1992, 2006–2008
  - Play-off qualification: 1990, 2006
- GFL2
  - Southern Division champions: 2005
  - Central Division champions: 1989
- Junior Bowl
  - Champions: 1995, 2001
  - Runners-up: 1991,1998, 2000, 2002, 2003

== Recent seasons ==
Recent seasons of the club:

Year	Division	Finish	Points	Pct.	Games	W	D	L	PF	PA	Postseason
2005	GFL2 (South)	1st	24–4	0.857	14	12	0	2	533	227	—
2006	GFL (South)	4th	7–17	0.292	12	3	1	8	237	319	Lost QF: Braunschweig Lions (0–79)
2007	GFL (South)	5th	2–22	0.083	12	1	0	11	102	356	—
2008	GFL (South)	6th	1–23	0.042	12	0	1	11	121	443	Lost RR: Plattling Black Hawks (33–43 & 36–44)
2009	GFL2 (South)	3rd	16–12	0.571	14	8	0	6	321	175	—
2010	GFL2 (South)	5th	10−18	0.357	14	4	2	8	247	255	—
2011	GFL2 (South)	4th	20–8	0.714	14	10	0	4	282	220	—
2012	GFL2 (South)	8th	6–22	0.214	14	3	0	11	253	328	—
2013	Regionalliga Mitte	1st	20–0	1.000	10	10	0	0	306	69	—
2014	GFL2 (South)	7th	10–18	0.357	14	5	0	9	180	260	—
2015	GFL2 (South)	7th	6–22	0.214	14	3	0	11	158	487	—
2016	Regionalliga Mitte	6th	7–13	0.350	10	3	1	6	80	164	—
2017	Regionalliga Mitte	2nd	14–6	0.700	10	7	0	3	250	149	—
2018	Regionalliga Mitte	1st	16–0	1.000	8	8	0	0	354	65	Won PR: Biberach Beavers (15–31) & Fursty Razorbacks (36–19)
2019	GFL2 (South)	6th	6–18	0.250	12	3	0	9	176	420	—
2020	GFL2 (South)	No season played because of the COVID-19 pandemic									
2021	Waiving of competition – relegated to lower level										

- RR = Relegation round
- PR = Promotion round
- QF = Quarter finals
