= German Junior Bowl =

- First meeting: Cologne, 1982
- Latest meeting: Düsseldorf

Statistics
- Total meetings: 42 (1982-20243)
- Most wins: Düsseldorf Panther (18, last 2024)

The German Junior Bowl, usually only referred to as Junior Bowl, is the annual national championship game for junior teams in the sport of American football in Germany. It is contested by the two best teams of the GFL Juniors.

It is the second-oldest still existing bowl game in Germany, after the German Bowl, dating back to 1982. Record winners are the Düsseldorf Panther, who celebrated their 18th success and their 23nd Junior Bowl appearance in 2024.

== History ==
The first edition of the Junior Bowl was held in 1982 and became a recognised national championship in the following year. Until 2000, regional championships were held rather than a national league. The regional champions then participated in the play-offs to determine the national champion.

In 2001, the GFL Juniors was introduced. The league consisted, for the most part of its existence, of twelve teams, split into three regional divisions, north, central and south, with four teams each. The best eight clubs then took part in the play-offs to determine the two teams that will play in the Junior Bowl.

Like Germany's elite league, the German Football League, the GFL Juniors will be expanded for the 2011 season and play with four regional divisions of five teams each. However, the new western division will play with only four clubs as the Langenfeld Longhorns have withdrawn from the league. In 2012, the divisions will then expand to six teams each, taking the number of elite level junior clubs to 24.

== Junior Bowls ==
The Junior Bowls since 1982:

=== By game ===
Year	Champions	Runners-up	Score	Location	Attendance
1982	Düsseldorf Panther	Cologne Crocodiles	13–6	Cologne	
1983	Cologne Crocodiles	München Rangers	13–6	Rüsselsheim	
1984	Düsseldorf Bulldozer	München Rangers	19–0	Düsseldorf	
1985	Düsseldorf Panther	Noris Rams	50–19	Nuremberg	
1986	Düsseldorf Panther	Munich Cowboys	22–0	Cologne	
1987	Düsseldorf Panther	Munich Cowboys	19–14	Mainz	
1988	Düsseldorf Panther	Würzburg Pumas	27–8	Hanover	
1989	Berlin Adler	Kempten Comets	36–12	Nuremberg	
1990	Berlin Adler	Ansbach Grizzlies	28–0	Düsseldorf	400
1991	Düsseldorf Panther	Darmstadt Diamonds	22–12	Hamburg	
1992	Berlin Rebels	Stuttgart Scorpions	38–6	Hanover	2,734
1993	Cologne Crocodiles	Regensburg Royals	44–6	Stuttgart	
1994	Berlin Adler	Frankfurt Gamblers	22–0	Rüsselsheim	1,340
1995	Darmstadt Diamonds	Düsseldorf Panther	19–13	Stuttgart	700
1996	Berlin Rebels	Munich Cowboys	41–12	Aschaffenburg	500
1997	Berlin Adler	Schwäbisch Hall Unicorns	33–0	Hamburg	770
1998	Düsseldorf Panther	Darmstadt Diamonds	13–9	Braunschweig	1,400
1999	Hamburg Blue Devils	Stuttgart Scorpions	43–0	Hanau	832
2000	Berlin Rebels	Darmstadt Diamonds	19–14	Hanau	782
2001	Darmstadt Diamonds	Stuttgart Scorpions	13–6	Koblenz	700
2002	Düsseldorf Panther	Darmstadt Diamonds	61–26	Düsseldorf	700
2003	Düsseldorf Panther	Darmstadt Diamonds	40–0	Schwäbisch Hall	583
2004	Düsseldorf Panther	Franken Knights	47–7	Düsseldorf	1,200
2005	Düsseldorf Panther	Franken Knights	48–10	Düsseldorf	1,050
2006	Düsseldorf Panther	Berlin Adler	26–7	Düsseldorf	1,530
2007	Düsseldorf Panther	Stuttgart Scorpions	47–26	Mönchengladbach	1,943
2008	Düsseldorf Panther	Stuttgart Scorpions	49–30	Mönchengladbach	1,500
2009	Berlin Adler	Cologne Falcons	21–14	Mönchengladbach	1,500
2010	Düsseldorf Panther	Hamburg Young Huskies	17–7	Berlin	513
2011	Cologne Falcons	Düsseldorf Panther	24–18	Cologne	4,362
2012	Cologne Falcons	Cologne Crocodiles	40–13	Cologne	2,350
2013	Saarland Hurricanes	Cologne Crocodiles	26–25	Düsseldorf	1,900
2014	Cologne Crocodiles	Düsseldorf Panther	37–0	Düsseldorf	
2015	Cologne Crocodiles	Dortmund Giants	36–14	Cologne	
2016	Schwäbisch Hall Unicorns	Cologne Crocodiles	24–21	Schwäbisch Hall	
2017	Paderborn Dolphins	Düsseldorf Panther	27–22	Paderborn	1,500
2018	Paderborn Dolphins	Düsseldorf Panther	21–14	Stuttgart	
2019	Cologne Crocodiles	Wiesbaden Phantoms	57–18	Schwäbisch Hall	935
2021	Cologne Crocodiles	Fursty Razorbacks	21–7	Cologne	
2022	Düsseldorf Panther	Berlin Adler	23–6	Düsseldorf	3,000
2023	Düsseldorf Panther	Berlin Adler	30–26	Düsseldorf	
2024	Düsseldorf Panther	Berlin Adler	36–0 (Note: Berlins team refused to play the final and hence was disqualified)	Berlin	
2025	Düsseldorf Panther	Schwäbisch Hall Unicorns	49–0	Schwäbisch Hall	1,350
2026	Düsseldorf Panther	Schwäbisch Hall Unicorns	24–13	Schwäbisch Hall	

=== By team ===
App.	Team	Wins	Losses	Pct.	Season(s)^{†}
25	Düsseldorf Panther	20	5	0.800	**1982**, **1985**, **1986**, **1987**, **1988**, **1991**, 1995, **1998**, **2002**, **2003**, **2004**, **2005**, **2006**, **2007**, **2008**, **2010**, 2011, 2014, 2017, 2018, **2022**, **2023**, **2024**, **2025**, **2026**
10	Cologne Crocodiles	6	4	0.600	1982, **1983**, **1993**, 2012, 2013, **2014**, **2015**, **2019**, **2021**
9	Berlin Adler	5	4	0.556	**1989**, **1990**, **1994**, **1997**, 2006, **2009**, 2022, 2023, 2024
7	Darmstadt Diamonds	2	5	0.286	1991, **1995**, 1998, 2000, **2001**, 2002, 2003
5	Stuttgart Scorpions	0	5	0.000	1992, 1999, 2001, 2007, 2008
4	Schwäbisch Hall Unicorns	1	3	0.250	1997, **2016**, 2025, 2026
3	Berlin Rebels	3	0	1.000	**1992**, **1996**, **2000**
3	Cologne Falcons	2	1	0.666	2009, **2011**, **2012**
3	Munich Cowboys	0	3	0.000	1986, 1987, 1996
2	Paderborn Dolphins	2	0	1.000	**2017**, **2018**
2	Franken Knights	0	2	0.000	2004, 2005
2	München Rangers	0	2	0.000	1983, 1984
1	Saarland Hurricanes	1	0	1.000	**2013**
1	Hamburg Blue Devils	1	0	1.000	**1999**
1	Düsseldorf Bulldozer	1	0	1.000	**1984**
1	Fursty Razorbacks	0	1	0.000	2021
1	Wiesbaden Phantoms	0	1	0.000	2019
1	Dortmund Giants	0	1	0.000	2015
1	Hamburg Young Huskies	0	1	0.000	2010
1	Frankfurt Gamblers	0	1	0.000	1994
1	Regensburg Royals	0	1	0.000	1993
1	Ansbach Grizzlies	0	1	0.000	1990
1	Kempten Comets	0	1	0.000	1989
1	Würzburg Pumas	0	1	0.000	1988
1	Noris Rams	0	1	0.000	1985

- ^{†} **Bold** denotes Junior Bowl victory.
