= 2012 German Football League =

- League: German Football League
- Sport: American football
- Duration: 28 April–13 October 2012
- Teams: 16
- Promoted to GFL: Köln Falcons
- Relegated to GFL2: Lübeck Cougars

Regular season
- GFL North champions: Kiel Baltic Hurricanes
- GFL North runners-up: Berlin Adler
- GFL South champions: Schwäbisch Hall Unicorns
- GFL South runners-up: Rhein-Neckar Bandits

German Bowl XXXIV
- Champions: Schwäbisch Hall Unicorns
- Runners-up: Kiel Baltic Hurricanes

GFL seasons
- ← 2011 2013 →

The 2012 German Football League season was the thirty fourth edition of the top-level American football competition in Germany and thirteenth since the renaming of the American football Bundesliga to German Football league.

== League tables ==
=== GFL ===
The league tables of the two GFL divisions:

GFL North
P	Team	G	W	T	L	PF	PA	PCT
1	Kiel Baltic Hurricanes	14	13	0	1	593	272	0.929
2	Berlin Adler	14	11	0	3	412	294	0.786
3	Dresden Monarchs	14	10	0	4	481	297	0.714
4	Düsseldorf Panther	14	7	2	5	509	453	0.571
5	Berlin Rebels	14	6	1	7	371	258	0.464
6	Braunschweig Lions	14	4	0	10	374	497	0.286
7	Hamburg Blue Devils	14	2	0	12	257	586	0.143
8	Lübeck Cougars	14	1	1	12	239	579	0.107

GFL South
P	Team	G	W	T	L	PF	PA	PCT
1	Schwäbisch Hall Unicorns	14	12	0	2	654	302	0.857
2	Rhein-Neckar Bandits	14	10	0	4	418	439	0.714
3	Marburg Mercenaries	14	9	0	5	473	339	0.643
4	Stuttgart Scorpions	14	8	2	4	344	271	0.643
5	Franken Knights	14	6	0	8	438	579	0.429
6	Wiesbaden Phantoms	14	4	0	10	300	408	0.286
7	Saarland Hurricanes	14	3	1	10	366	479	0.250
8	Munich Cowboys	14	2	1	11	297	473	0.179

Source: football-aktuell.de, GFL.info

=== GFL2 ===
The league tables of the two GFL2 divisions:

GFL2 North
P	Team	G	W	T	L	PF	PA	PCT
1	AFC Köln Falcons	14	11	0	3	480	262	0.786
2	Cottbus Crayfish	14	11	0	3	416	264	0.786
3	Troisdorf Jets	14	9	0	5	373	317	0.643
4	Hamburg Huskies	14	8	0	6	356	370	0.571
5	Osnabrück Tigers	14	8	0	6	410	327	0.571
6	Bonn Gamecocks	14	4	1	9	349	374	0.321
7	Hildesheim Invaders	14	2	1	11	222	347	0.179
8	Assindia Cardinals	14	1	2	11	137	482	0.143

GFL2 South
P	Team	G	W	T	L	PF	PA	PCT
1	Allgäu Comets	14	12	0	2	585	332	0.857
2	Frankfurt Universe	14	9	1	4	284	226	0.679
3	Kaiserslautern Pikes	14	6	3	5	409	402	0.536
4	Nürnberg Rams	14	7	1	6	336	320	0.536
5	Frankfurt Pirates	14	5	2	7	291	389	0.429
6	Kirchdorf Wildcats	14	5	1	8	392	450	0.393
7	Holzgerlingen Twister	14	5	0	9	265	368	0.357
8	Darmstadt Diamonds	14	3	0	11	253	328	0.214

Key

GFL: Qualified for play-offs GFL2: Promoted	Relegation play-offs Promotion play-offs	Relegated

== Play-offs ==
Quarterfinals
N1	Kiel Baltic Hurricanes	70
S4	Stuttgart Scorpions	22
S2	Rhein-Neckar Bandits	19
N3	Dresden Monarchs	31
S1	Schwäbisch Hall Unicorns	41
N4	Düsseldorf Panther	25
N2	Berlin Adler	35
S3	Marburg Mercenaries	21

Semifinals
N1	Kiel Baltic Hurricanes	35
N3	Dresden Monarchs	14
S1	Schwäbisch Hall Unicorns	38
N2	Berlin Adler	21

German Bowl
N1	Kiel Baltic Hurricanes	53
S1	Schwäbisch Hall Unicorns	56
