= Dortmund Giants =

American football team from Dortmund, Germany

- Founded: 22 May 1980
- League: Oberliga
- Based in: Dortmund
- Arena: Sportanlage Fredenbaum
- Colors: Blue and White
- Head coach: Kay Friedrich
- Championships: none
- Cheerleaders: Silverettes
- Website: www.dortmund-giants.de

The Dortmund Giants are an American football team from Dortmund, Germany. The official name of the club is 1. Dortmunder Footballclub Dortmund 1980 "Giants" e.V..

The club's greatest success has been promotion to the American football Bundesliga, now the German Football League, in 1980 and 1984 where it played for 10 seasons until 1993. In this era it qualified for the play-offs on five occasions, advancing to the semi-finals in 1989.

== History ==
Established on 22 May 1980 the Dortmund Giants were admitted to the American football Bundesliga the year after. The club dropped down to the 2. Bundesliga for the following season and spend three years there before a division title took it back to the Bundesliga.

The Giants spend the next nine seasons in the top tier, experiencing their most successful era from 1986 to 1990 when the club qualified for the play-offs each season. It advanced as far as the semi-finals 1989 after victories over the Cologne Crocodiles and Noris Rams before losing to eventual champions Berlin Adler. The Giants declined from there, finishing at the bottom end of the northern division after this and eventually being relegated in 1993.

The club spent the 1994 season in the 2. Bundesliga before dropping for two seasons to the tier three Regionalliga West. Five more 2. Bundesliga seasons followed from 1997 to 2001, the final one in a combined team with the Bochum Cadets as the Dortmund B1 Giants.

After a season below expectation the cooperation with Bochum was discontinued and the Giants withdrew to the tier five Verbandsliga. It won promotion to the Oberliga in its first year there and fluctuated for the next seven seasons between the Oberliga and Regionalliga. After a five-season spell in the Regionalliga the club finished the 2014 season without a win and had to return to the Oberliga once more.

== Honours ==
- Bundesliga
  - League membership: (10) 1981, 1985–1993
  - Play-off qualification: (5) 1986–1990
- 2. Bundesliga
  - Northern Division champions: (1) 1984
