= Marburg Mercenaries =

American football team in Marburg, Germany

- Founded: 1991
- League: German Football League
- Based in: Marburg, Germany
- Stadium: Georg-Gaßmann-Stadion
- Colors: Red, White and Black
- Championships: EFAF Cup: 2005
- Website: mercenaries.de

The Marburg Mercenaries are an American football team from Marburg, Germany.

Internationally, the club's greatest success came in 2005, when it won the EFAF Cup, followed by a losing appearance in the Eurobowl in 2007. Domestically, the team's greatest achievement was to reach the 2006 German Bowl, where the team lost to the Braunschweig Lions.

== History ==
The Marburg Mercenaries were formed in 1991 under the official name of AFV Marburg Mercenaries e.V..

The club entered competitive league football in the following year, playing in the tier-five Verbandsliga Hessen, a regional league in its home state of Hesse. The Mercenaries gradually worked their way up through the local league system, culminating in a title in the tier-three Regionalliga Mitte in 1997, which allowed the club to take up promotion to the 2nd Bundesliga.

For the next five years, the team played in the southern division of this league, once more gradually improving its performances, to a point where they won their division in 2001 and 2002. In its first attempt at promotion to the German Football League, the team failed however, losing to the Franken Knights in both promotion games. It performed much better the following year, defeating the Munich Cowboys in both promotion games and moving up into the GFL.

The Mercenaries first season at this level became a struggle, winning only one out of twelve league games, and having to defend their league place against the Simbach Wildcats in the relegation round. With this successfully achieved, the team moved on to much better performances from now on.

The club became a constant contender for the division title from now on, winning it in 2004, 2005, 2006, 2008 and 2010 and reaching, as a minimum, the play-off semi finals on each occasion. The team's best season domestically however was 2006, when it reached the German Bowl, where it lost 13–31 to the Braunschweig Lions. Apart from the significances of this achievement to the club, it also broke a thirteen-year drought for the clubs from the southern division, as no southern club had reached the German Bowl since the Munich Cowboys won it in 1993.

Internationally, the Mercenaries won their first title in 2005, when they won the second-tier EFAF Cup. In 2007, the team also participated in the European Football League, where it reached the final, the Eurobowl, but lost quite clearly to the Vikings Vienna.

Marburg has since failed to reach another final, but remains a strong team in the southern division of the GFL. The team came second in its division in 2011, qualifying for the play-offs where they were knocked out by the Düsseldorf Panther in the quarter finals.

In 2012, the club came third in the southern division of the GFL and qualified for the play-off where it was knocked out by Berlin Adler in the quarter finals. The club finished second in 2013 but was again knocked out in the quarter finals of the play-off, this time by the Kiel Baltic Hurricanes.

In the 2014 season the team came third in the southern division of the GFL but lost 22–42 to the Dresden Monarchs in the quarter finals of the play-offs. In 2015, the club came only sixth and missed out on play-off qualification for the first time since 2003.

== Honours ==
- Eurobowl
  - Runners-up: 2007
- EFAF Cup:
  - Champions: 2005
- German Bowl
  - Runners-up: 2006
- EFL
  - Participations: 2007
- GFL
  - Southern Division champions: (5) 2004–2006, 2008, 2010
  - Play-off qualification : (13) 2004–2014, 2017, 2019
  - League membership : (20) 2003–2023
- GFL2
  - Southern Division champions: 2001, 2002

== German Bowl appearances ==
The club has only appeared once in the German Bowl:

| Bowl | Date | Champions | Runners-Up | Score | Location | Attendance |
|---|---|---|---|---|---|---|
| XXVIII | October 7, 2006 | **Braunschweig Lions** | Marburg Mercenaries | 31–13 | Braunschweig | 15,897 |

- Champions in **bold**.

== Recent seasons ==
Recent seasons of the club:

| **Year** | **Division** | **Finish** | **Points** | **Pct.** | **Games** | **W** | **D** | **L** | **PF** | **PA** | **Postseason** |
| 2003 | GFL (South) | 6th | 2–22 | 0.083 | 12 | 1 | 0 | 11 | 276 | 425 | — |
| 2004 | GFL (South) | 1st | 17–3 | 0.850 | 10 | 8 | 1 | 1 | 433 | 206 | **Won** QF: Hamburg Blue Devils (24–21) Lost SF: Berlin Adler (30–31) |
| 2005 | GFL (South) | 1st | 17–3 | 0.850 | 10 | 8 | 1 | 1 | 350 | 174 | **Won** QF: Berlin Adler (40–21) Lost SF: Hamburg Blue Devils (41–42 aet) |
| 2006 | GFL (South) | 1st | 20–4 | 0.833 | 12 | 10 | 0 | 2 | 471 | 214 | **Won** QF: Cologne Falcons (62–0) **Won** SF: Hamburg Blue Devils (33–20) Lost GB: Braunschweig Lions (13–31) |
| 2007 | GFL (South) | 2nd | 19–5 | 0.792 | 12 | 9 | 1 | 2 | 363 | 191 | **Won** QF: Kiel Baltic Hurricanes (21–16) Lost SF: Braunschweig Lions (21–26) |
| 2008 | GFL (South) | 1st | 18–6 | 0.750 | 12 | 9 | 0 | 3 | 356 | 206 | **Won** QF: Dresden Monarchs (33–21) Lost SF: Braunschweig Lions (21–49) |
| 2009 | GFL (South) | 2nd | 14–10 | 0.583 | 12 | 7 | 0 | 5 | 422 | 328 | **Won** QF: Dresden Monarchs (64–63) Lost SF: Berlin Adler (21–36) |
| 2010 | GFL (South) | 1st | 20–4 | 0.833 | 12 | 10 | 0 | 2 | 437 | 216 | **Won** QF: Braunschweig Lions (31–21) Lost SF: Berlin Adler (6–17) |
| 2011 | GFL (South) | 2nd | 22–4 | 0.846 | 13 | 11 | 0 | 2 | 392 | 240 | Lost QF: Düsseldorf Panther (10–14) |
| 2012 | GFL (South) | 3rd | 18–10 | 0.643 | 14 | 9 | 0 | 5 | 473 | 339 | Lost QF: Berlin Adler (21–35) |
| 2013 | GFL (South) | 2nd | 21–7 | 0.750 | 14 | 10 | 1 | 3 | 488 | 353 | Lost QF: Kiel Baltic Hurricanes (9–47) |
| 2014 | GFL (South) | 3rd | 18–10 | 0.643 | 14 | 9 | 0 | 5 | 476 | 431 | Lost QF: Dresden Monarchs (22–42) |
| 2015 | GFL (South) | 6th | 6–22 | 0.214 | 14 | 3 | 0 | 11 | 286 | 484 | — |
| 2016 | GFL (South) | 7th | 4–24 | 0.143 | 14 | 2 | 0 | 12 | 284 | 591 | — |
| 2017 | GFL (South) | 3rd | 16–12 | 0.571 | 14 | 8 | 0 | 6 | 344 | 320 | Lost QF: Kiel Baltic Hurricanes (14–28) |
| 2018 | GFL (South) | 5th | 12–16 | 0.429 | 14 | 6 | 0 | 8 | 366 | 438 | — |
| 2019 | GFL (South) | 3rd | 18–10 | 0.643 | 14 | 9 | 0 | 5 | 493 | 378 | Lost QF: Dresden Monarchs (22–39) |
| 2020 | GFL (South) | No season played because of the COVID-19 pandemic | | | | | | | | | |
| 2021 | GFL (South) | 6th | 4–16 | 0.200 | 10 | 2 | 0 | 8 | 189 | 350 | — |
| 2022 | GFL (South) | 6th | 8–12 | 0.400 | 10 | 4 | 0 | 6 | 225 | 255 | — |
| 2023 | GFL (South) | 7th | 6–18 | 0.250 | 12 | 3 | – | 9 | 251 | 383 | withdrew after season |
| 2024 | Regionalliga (Central) | 2nd | 18–2 | 0.900 | 10 | 9 | – | 1 | 371 | 93 | — |

- QF = Quarter finals.
- SF = Semi finals.
- GB = German Bowl.
- The final game of the 2011 season against the Schwäbisch Hall Unicorns was not played because of heavy rain on game day.
