= Rhein-Neckar Bandits =

- Founded: 2003
- League: German Football League
- Based in: Mannheim, Germany
- Arena: MTG Stadion
- Colors: Black and Red
- President: Walter Burkhardt
- Head coach: Marvin Washington
- Championships: none
- Cheerleaders: Six Shooters
- Website: www.bandits-football.de

The Rhein-Neckar Bandits are an American football team from Mannheim, Germany. The club's greatest success came in 2011, when it earned promotion to the German Football League, followed by a second-place finish in the southern division of the GFL in 2012. The current name is since end of 2017 Mannheim Bandits.

== History ==
The club was formed in 2003 in a merger of two local sides, the Hockenheim Renegades and the Heidelberg Toreros. The club is not related to the Rhein-Main Razorbacks, a team from Rüsselsheim, which folded in early 2004.

The club's first league season, in 2004, was spent in the tier four Oberliga Baden Württemberg, which it finished in first place, winning all ten season games. Four seasons in the tier three Regionalliga Mitte followed, with a second place in 2008 as its best result, a place that also allowed it to be promoted to the German Football League 2 via the promotion round, where they defeated Bavarian champions Aschaffenburg Stallions.

The Bandits spend the next three seasons in the GFL 2, gradually improving their results, coming fifth, fourth and second. The second place in 2011 allowed the team to take part in the promotion round to an enlarged GFL. However, when the Plattling Black Hawks, last placed n the GFL South, declared that they would withdraw their team to the third division Regionalliga the Bandits were granted direct promotion to the highest football league in Germany. The season however had been a tight affair, with the Bandits finishing on equal points with the Holzgerlingen Twister and Darmstadt Diamonds in second place behind champions Franken Knights. The final placings in the league had to be decided by the games played between the three clubs, in which the Bandits had the best record.

In 2012, the club came second in the southern division of the GFL and qualified for the play-off where it was knocked out by Dresden Monarchs in the quarter-finals. The side qualified for the play-offs once more in 2013 but was once again knocked out in the quarter-finals, this time by the Braunschweig Lions. The 2014 and 2015 seasons saw the club finish only seventh in the southern division of the GFL and miss out on the play-offs.

In 2016, the club lost all his games and descended. The team disintegrated and started 2017 in the lowest division, the county league BaWü. The season ended with second place in nine wins and one defeat. After the end of the 2017 season the Teams changed its name to Mannheim Bandits.

== Honours ==
- GFL
  - League membership: (5) 2012–2016
  - Play-off qualification : (2) 2012, 2013

== Recent seasons ==
Recent seasons of the club:

Year	Division	Finish	Points	Pct.	Games	W	D	L	PF	PA	Postseason
2005	Regionalliga Mitte	4th	7–13	0.350	10	3	1	6	241	295	—
2006	Regionalliga Mitte	2nd	11–9	0.550	10	5	1	4	122	116	—
2007	Regionalliga Mitte	3rd	13–7	0.650	10	6	1	3	181	114	—
2008	Regionalliga Mitte	2nd	22–2	0.917	12	11	0	1	358	151	Won PR: Aschaffenburg Stallions (34–8 & 41–30)
2009	GFL 2 (South)	5th	14–14	0.500	14	7	0	7	329	301	—
2010	GFL 2 (South)	4th	18–10	0.643	14	9	0	5	300	225	—
2011	GFL 2 (South)	2nd	20–8	0.714	14	10	0	4	377	213	—
2012	GFL (South)	2nd	20–8	0.714	14	10	0	4	418	439	Lost QF: Dresden Monarchs (19–31)
2013	GFL (South)	4th	18–10	0.643	14	9	0	5	395	389	Lost QF: Braunschweig Lions (21–28)
2014	GFL (South)	7th	6–22	0.214	14	3	0	11	447	560	—
2015	GFL (South)	7th	4–24	0.143	14	2	0	12	171	493	—
2016	GFL (South)	8th	0–28	0.000	14	0	0	14	171	708	Lost RR: Ingolstadt Dukes (6–41 & 0–60)

- RR = Relegation round
- PR = Promotion round
- QF = Quarter finals
- SF = Semi finals
- GB = German Bowl
