= 2016 German Football League =

- League: German Football League
- Sport: American football
- Duration: 16 April–8 October 2016
- Teams: 16
- Promoted to GFL: Cologne Crocodiles Ingolstadt Dukes
- Relegated to GFL 2: Düsseldorf Panther Rhein-Neckar Bandits

Regular season
- GFL North champions: New Yorker Lions
- GFL North runners-up: Dresden Monarchs
- GFL South champions: Schwäbisch Hall Unicorns
- GFL South runners-up: Frankfurt Universe

German Bowl XXXVIII
- Champions: New Yorker Lions
- Runners-up: Schwäbisch Hall Unicorns

GFL seasons
- ← 2015 2017 →

The 2016 German Football League season was the 38th edition of the top-level American football competition in Germany and seventeenth since the renaming of the American Football Bundesliga to German Football league.

The regular season started on 16 April and finished on 10 September 2016, followed by the play-offs. The season culminated in the German Bowl XXXVIII, held on 8 October 2016 in Berlin. The championship was won by the New Yorker Lions who defeated the Schwäbisch Hall Unicorns 31–20 in a repeat of the 2014 and 2015 finals, which the Lions had also won.

== Modus ==
Location of teams in the German Football League 2016

During the regular season each club plays all other clubs in its division twice, home and away, resulting in each team playing 14 regular season games. There are no games between clubs from opposite divisions, interconference games having been abolished after the 2011 season when the GFL was expanded from 14 to 16 teams.

The best four teams in each division qualify for the play-offs where, in the quarter-finals, teams from opposite divisions play each other, whereby the better placed teams have home field advantage. The first placed team plays the fourth placed from the other division and the second placed the third placed team. From the semi-finals onwards teams from the same division can meet again.

The eighth placed team in each division entered a two-leg play-off with the winner of the respective division of the German Football League 2, the second tier of the league system in Germany. The winners of this contest qualified for the GFL for the following season. In case of a GFL division consisting of less than eight clubs no play-off is necessary.

== Season overview ==
Compared to the 2015 season, two new clubs will compete in the GFL in 2016. The Hildesheim Invaders filled the vacant spot in the northern division while the Frankfurt Universe replaced the Franken Knights in the south. For Hildesheim it marked a return to the league after 25 years, having spent two seasons in the Bundesliga in 1990 and 1991 while Frankfurt won promotion to the GFL for the first time.

In the season opener, Frankfurt which had raised expectations through high caliber names on the roster and a perfect season in the GFL2 in 2015 played against Southern Powerhouse Schwäbisch Hall, which had just gotten a lot of attention due to Moritz Böhringer playing for them before entering the NFL draft. In a hard fought match with errors on both sides, Schwäbisch Hall, led by Quarterback Marco Ehrenfried ultimately prevailed 26–21. This was also the last GFL game receiver Patrick Donahue played for Schwäbisch Hall before being invited to rookie minicamp by the Green Bay Packers. In the first game in the North, defending champion Brunswick easily prevailed over the Hamburg Huskies 44–3. The Dresden Monarchs, which had been a perpetual playoff contender in previous years but lost many players after the 2015 season drew their first away game against the Berlin Rebels 21–21. The German teams that had qualified for European competitions (BIG 6 and EFL Bowl) meanwhile fared a lot worse than in previous years. While both competitions had been dominated by German teams and both finals had been played between two German teams, this year Kiel lost their opening match in the EFL Bowl at home against the Amsterdam Crusaders 24–31 in Overtime, setting the tone for the ensuing games, which would result in a Hamburg loss to Amsterdam on the road (64–19), a Schwäbisch Hall loss to the Swarco Raiders Tirol on the road in the Big 6 (34–0) and losses for the Berlin Adler in all their games. The only German teams showing anything approaching the previous dominance were the New Yorker Lions, that won on the road against the Vienna Vikings (14–21) and at home against the Aix-en-Provence Argonautes (53–0) thus qualifying for Eurobowl XXX and the newly promoted Frankfurt Universe that won their first ever official European match on the road against the Thonon Black Panthers (0–48). While the Dresden Monarchs managed to get some redemption by convincingly winning their home opener against the Berlin Adler (71–20) in front of over 6000 spectators, the Berlin Rebels continued to raise expectations by narrowly beating the Kiel Baltic Hurricanes 19–17 at home. The Adler meanwhile went on the road against the Hamburg Huskies beating them 17–14 to the surprise of many observers, who had seen the Adler as without a chance given their performance in Dresden. This also showed that the defeats in the EFL were not a fluke for Hamburg and Kiel. In the South the Allgäu Comets managed to reduce the costly errors late in the game that had cost them many narrow games in the previous season to beat Stuttgart 30–24 at home after a 29–62 road win against Munich in which Grant Isdale made five Touchdowns in a single half. The Schwäbisch Hall Unicorns returned from their lopsided loss to Tirol to beat the Marburg Mercenaries 56–25. Hildesheim won their first game after being promoted against Düsseldorf (51–20) but lost the next game in Braunschweig in a lopsided 52–7. Whereas Dresden went on the road to Kiel to get their first defeat of the season (35–30). The game was decided late when Dresden failed to convert four times on their last drive. Stuttgart lost at home to Frankfurt (43–49) in an offensive slugfest with defensive errors on both sides giving Universe their first ever GFL win. The rematch of Kiel-Dresden took place in Dresden and as many times before Dresden delivered revenge on their foes from the Baltic, jumping up to a 21–0 lead in the first quarter and putting the game out of reach by halftime (35–0) keeping Kiel off the scoreboard until the second half before finally prevailing 56–14. In the South Munich fell to the Allgäu Comets once more losing 42–10 on the road. While Schwäbisch Hall prevailed 37–14 at home over the Saarland Hurricanes reducing the number of undefeated teams in the South to two. Frankfurt meanwhile had no problem dispatching of their European adversary Badalona Dracs (49–7) and thus the second German team advanced to a European Final - after four German teams had stood in the two European finals the previous season. After their convincing home win against Kiel, the Dresden Monarchs had to go on the road to top rival Braunschweig and despite bringing them closer to defeat than any other team in that season thus far, they ultimately lost 33–26, despite leading by a point at the half. Frankfurt meanwhile showed their potential by going on the road to Kempten beating the Allgäu Comets 10–0 in a defense heavy game with heavy rain affecting the play of both teams. The only Touchdown in the Frankfurt Kempten game came of a special teams play. Hall beat the Mercenaries on the road (49–20) thus staying the only team in the south to have a perfect winning percentage in league games. The Huskies meanwhile finally got their first win of the season beating Düsseldorf on the road 31–20.

== League tables ==
=== GFL ===
The league tables of the two GFL divisions:

==== North ====
Pos	Team	Pld	W	D	L	PF	PA	PD	PCT	Qualification or relegation
1	New Yorker Lions	14	11	2	1	547	171	+376	.857	Qualification to play-offs
2	Dresden Monarchs	14	10	2	2	708	345	+363	.786	Qualification to play-offs
3	Kiel Baltic Hurricanes	14	10	1	3	483	297	+186	.750	Qualification to play-offs
4	Berlin Rebels	14	10	1	3	494	315	+179	.750	Qualification to play-offs
5	Hildesheim Invaders	14	5	0	9	445	569	−124	.357	
6	Hamburg Huskies	14	4	0	10	370	629	−259	.286	
7	Berlin Adler	14	3	0	11	296	643	−347	.214	
8	Düsseldorf Panther	14	0	0	14	270	644	−374	.000	Relegation play-offs to GFL2

Source: Football-aktuell, GFL.info, Scoresway
Rules for classification: 1) Winning percentage, (Note: The official standings of the GFL actually use points (plus two for a win, one positive and one negative for a draw and minus two for a loss) instead of winning percentage, which sometimes produce different results if teams have unequal numbers of games played) 2) Head-to-head results

==== South ====
Pos	Team	Pld	W	D	L	PF	PA	PD	PCT	Qualification or relegation
1	Schwäbisch Hall Unicorns	14	14	0	0	694	282	+412	1.000	Qualification to play-offs
2	Frankfurt Universe	14	12	0	2	546	173	+373	.857	Qualification to play-offs
3	Saarland Hurricanes	14	8	0	6	415	370	+45	.571	Qualification to play-offs
4	Allgäu Comets	14	8	0	6	492	340	+152	.571	Qualification to play-offs
5	Stuttgart Scorpions	14	7	0	7	474	387	+87	.500	
6	Munich Cowboys	14	5	0	9	335	560	−225	.357	
7	Marburg Mercenaries	14	2	0	12	284	591	−307	.143	
8	Rhein-Neckar Bandits	14	0	0	14	171	708	−537	.000	Relegation play-offs to GFL2

Source: Football-aktuell, GFL.info, Scoresway
Rules for classification: 1) Winning percentage, 2) Head-to-head results

=== GFL 2 ===
The league tables of the two GFL 2 divisions:

==== North ====
Pos	Team	Pld	W	D	L	PF	PA	PD	PCT	Qualification or relegation
1	Cologne Crocodiles	14	13	0	1	560	183	+377	.929	Qualification to promotion play-off
2	Paderborn Dolphins	14	10	0	4	534	408	+126	.714	
3	Potsdam Royals	14	9	0	5	422	352	+70	.643	
4	Lübeck Cougars	14	8	0	6	496	303	+193	.571	
5	Bonn Gamecocks	14	7	0	7	446	366	+80	.500	
6	Assindia Cardinals	14	4	0	10	277	414	−137	.286	
7	Bielefeld Bulldogs	14	3	0	11	288	569	−281	.214	Relegation to Regionalliga
8	Ritterhude Badgers	14	2	0	12	246	673	−427	.143	Relegation to Regionalliga

Updated to match(es) played on 4 September 2016. Source: Football-aktuell, GFL.info
Rules for classification: 1) Winning percentage, 2) Head-to-head results

==== South ====
Pos	Team	Pld	W	D	L	PF	PA	PD	PCT	Qualification or relegation
1	Ingolstadt Dukes	14	14	0	0	565	169	+396	1.000	Qualification to promotion play-off
2	Kirchdorf Wildcats	14	10	1	3	604	325	+279	.750	
3	Wiesbaden Phantoms	14	10	0	4	465	324	+141	.714	
4	Nürnberg Rams	14	7	1	6	483	449	+34	.536	
5	Ravensburg Razorbacks	14	6	0	8	377	523	−146	.429	
6	Gießen Golden Dragons	14	4	2	8	325	398	−73	.357	
7	Franken Knights	14	3	0	11	296	455	−159	.214	Relegation to Regionalliga
8	München Rangers	14	0	0	14	124	596	−472	.000	Relegation to Regionalliga

Updated to match(es) played on 10 September 2016. Source: Football-aktuell, GFL.info
Rules for classification: 1) Winning percentage, 2) Head-to-head results

== Play-offs ==
The quarter-finals of the 2016 play-offs were played on 17 and 18 September. The German Bowl was held on 8 October at the Friedrich-Ludwig-Jahn-Sportpark in Berlin. Home field advantage is granted to the better placed team during the regular season (e.g. 2nd has home field advantage against the 3rd).

The first round of the Playoffs saw the home teams prevail in three out of the four games, with Dresden and Braunschweig in especially dominant fashion. For Schwäbisch Hall a good first half was sufficient to outlast the attempts by the Rebels to reverse their fortunes in the second half. Frankfurt lost its first playoff game in team history to the surprise of some in a heavy rain to Kiel who ultimately prevailed 10:03 in a low scoring game. 2016 marks the third time in a row that Dresden plays Schwäbisch Hall on the road in the semifinals. In both 2015 and 2014 Hall ultimately prevailed and went on to lose the German Bowl to Braunschweig. The same occurred in this season as well. With both the Unicorns and the Lions winning their home semifinals, and the Lions ultimately defeating the Unicorns in German Bowl XXXVIII. After missing the semifinal in 2017, Dresden would again lose their semifinals in Schwäbisch Hall in 2018 and 2019.

Quarterfinals
N1	New Yorker Lions	30
S4	Allgäu Comets	6
S2	Frankfurt Universe	3
N3	Kiel Baltic Hurricanes	10
S1	Schwäbisch Hall Unicorns	24
N4	Berlin Rebels	14
N2	Dresden Monarchs	43
S3	Saarland Hurricanes	7

Semifinals
N1	New Yorker Lions	38
N3	Kiel Baltic Hurricanes	21
S1	Schwäbisch Hall Unicorns	35
N2	Dresden Monarchs	26

German Bowl
N1	New Yorker Lions	31
S1	Schwäbisch Hall Unicorns	20

== Relegation and Promotion round ==
Division	GFL Team	GFL2 Team	1st leg	2nd leg	Total
North	Düsseldorf Panther	Cologne Crocodiles	0–34	0–28	0–62
South	Rhein-Neckar Bandits	Ingolstadt Dukes	6–41	0–60	6–101
