= 2013 German Football League =

- Logo of German Bowl XXXV
- League: German Football League
- Sport: American football
- Duration: 4 May–12 October 2013
- Teams: 16
- Promoted to GFL: Allgäu Comets
- Relegated to GFL 2: Wiesbaden Phantoms

Regular season
- GFL North champions: New Yorker Lions
- GFL North runners-up: Dresden Monarchs
- GFL South champions: Schwäbisch Hall Unicorns
- GFL South runners-up: Marburg Mercenaries

German Bowl XXXV
- Champions: New Yorker Lions
- Runners-up: Dresden Monarchs

GFL seasons
- ← 2012 2014 →

The 2013 German Football League season was the thirty fifth edition of the top-level American football competition in Germany and fourteenth since the renaming of the American football Bundesliga to German Football league.

The regular season started on 5 May and finished on 15 September 2013, followed by the play-offs. The season culminated in the German Bowl XXXV, staged on 12 October 2013 in Berlin, as in 2012, and the fourth time for the championship decider to be held in the German capital.

The German Bowl was won by the New Yorker Lions, a club from the city of Braunschweig, who defeated the Dresden Monarchs by a score of 35–34. It was the club's eighth title overall and their first since 2008 while Dresden made their first-ever German Bowl appearance.

== Modus ==
Location of teams in the German Football League 2013

During the regular season each club played all other clubs in its division twice, home and away, resulting in each team playing 14 regular season games. There was no games between clubs from opposite divisions, inter conference games having been abolished after the 2011 season when the GFL was expanded from 14 to 16 teams.

The four best teams in each division qualified for the play-offs where, in the quarter finals, teams from opposite divisions played each other, whereby the better placed teams had home advantage. The first placed team played the fourth placed from the other division and the second placed the third placed team. From the semi-finals onwards teams from the same division could meet again.

The eighth placed team in each division entered a two-leg play-off with the winners of the respective division of the German Football League 2, the second tier of the league system in Germany. The winners of this contest qualified for the GFL for the following season.

== Season overview ==
The 2013 season saw one newly promoted team, the Cologne Falcons, who replaced the Lübeck Cougars in the northern division of the league.

The Wiesbaden Phantoms were relegated from the GFL South at the end of the 2013 season after losing to the Allgäu Comets while, in the northern division, the Cologne Falcons defended their league place against the Bielefeld Bulldogs. For Wiesbaden it meant the end to a three-year stint in the league. In January 2014 the Hamburg Blue Devils withdrew from the northern division, leaving it to play with seven clubs in the 2014 season.

The Dresden Monarchs played home games at three different venues that season as Heinz Steyer Stadion was unusable early in the season due to the 2013 European floods (coincidentally, the 2002 season, which saw Dresden promoted to the first division, also saw record flooding in Dresden) prompting them to move their home game against the Cologne Falcons to their training grounds at Bärnsdorfer Straße, while the home game against Hamburg was held at Rudolf Harbig Stadion before the Monarchs returned to Heinz Steyer Stadion for the rest of their home games that season.

Six of the eight teams qualified for the play-offs in 2012 did so again in 2013. Only the Düsseldorf Panther and the Stuttgart Scorpions missed out on post season play compare to the previous season. For Stuttgart it ended a run of fifteen consecutive post season appearances since 1998. In their stead the Munich Cowboys returned to the play-offs to make their twentieth appearance while, in the north, the New Yorker Lions returned after a two-year absence to make their sixteenth.

In the quarter-finals of the play-offs the four northern clubs defeated their southern opponents, resulting in an all northern division semi-final for the first time since 1999. The 2011 and 2012 champions Schwäbisch Hall Unicorns were knocked-out by the Berlin Adler, losing at home in the GFL for the first time since 2010. In the semi-finals the first and second placed teams won their home games against the third and fourth placed clubs. In the German Bowl XXXV the New Yorker Lions then defeated the Dresden Monarchs in front of over 12,000 spectators 35–34, the fifth time the German Bowl had been decided by just one point. It was the first appearance from a club from the former East Germany in a German Bowl. For the Lions the 2013 title signalled a return to former dominance after four difficult seasons that had followed their twelve consecutive German Bowl appearances from 1997 to 2008.

In the relegation play-offs between the last-placed southern team, the Wiesbaden Phantoms, and the winner of the GFL 2 South, the Allgäu Comets, the Comets won the first leg away 37–21 before losing 34–44 at home, thereby winning promotion to the GFL on overall points. The northern division saw the Cologne Falcons defeat the Bielefeld Bulldogs 42–30 at home and then lose 17–6 away, retaining their league place by just one point.

== League tables ==
=== GFL ===
The league tables of the two GFL divisions:

GFL North
P	Team	G	W	T	L	PF	PA	PCT
1	New Yorker Lions	14	13	0	1	493	177	0.929
2	Dresden Monarchs	14	11	0	3	513	254	0.786
3	Kiel Baltic Hurricanes	14	10	0	4	485	249	0.714
4	Berlin Adler	14	7	0	7	332	342	0.500
5	Berlin Rebels	14	6	0	8	365	360	0.429
6	Hamburg Blue Devils	14	4	0	10	225	448	0.286
7	Düsseldorf Panther	14	3	0	11	207	496	0.214
8	Cologne Falcons	14	2	0	12	209	503	0.143

GFL South
P	Team	G	W	T	L	PF	PA	PCT
1	Schwäbisch Hall Unicorns	14	11	1	2	549	223	0.821
2	Marburg Mercenaries	14	10	1	3	488	353	0.750
3	Munich Cowboys	14	9	1	4	380	275	0.679
4	Rhein-Neckar Bandits	14	9	0	5	395	389	0.643
5	Saarland Hurricanes	14	5	0	9	297	389	0.357
6	Stuttgart Scorpions	14	4	1	9	272	430	0.321
7	Franken Knights	14	4	0	10	302	488	0.286
8	Wiesbaden Phantoms	14	2	0	12	283	419	0.143

Source: football-aktuell.de, GFL.info

=== GFL2 ===
The league tables of the two GFL2 divisions:

GFL2 North
P	Team	G	W	T	L	PF	PA	PCT
1	Bielefeld Bulldogs	14	13	0	1	487	263	0.929
2	Troisdorf Jets	14	10	1	3	530	400	0.750
3	Hamburg Huskies	14	7	1	6	443	363	0.536
4	Bonn Gamecocks	14	6	3	5	373	370	0.536
5	Lübeck Cougars	14	6	1	7	350	314	0.464
6	Osnabrück Tigers	14	5	0	9	448	457	0.357
7	Cottbus Crayfish	14	5	0	9	356	494	0.357
8	Rostock Griffins	14	1	0	13	243	569	0.071

GFL2 South
P	Team	G	W	T	L	PF	PA	PCT
1	Allgäu Comets^{#}	13	12	0	1	506	247	0.923
2	Frankfurt Universe	14	9	1	4	368	249	0.679
3	Nürnberg Rams	14	8	1	5	404	325	0.607
4	Ravensburg Razorbacks	14	8	1	5	324	294	0.607
5	Kirchdorf Wildcats	14	7	0	7	366	293	0.500
6	Frankfurt Pirates	14	3	3	8	234	343	0.321
7	Starnberg Argonauts	14	3	1	10	298	526	0.250
8	Kaiserslautern Pikes^{#}	13	1	1	11	290	513	0.115

- ^{#} The home game of the Kaiserslautern Pikes against the Allgäu Comets was not played.

=== Key ===
GFL: Qualified for play-offs GFL 2: Promoted	Relegation play-offs Promotion play-offs	Relegated

== Play-offs ==
The quarter-finals of the 2013 play-offs were played on 21 and 22 September, the semi-finals on 28 September and 3 October and the German Bowl on 12 October 2013. The German Bowl was held at the Friedrich-Ludwig-Jahn-Sportpark in Berlin.

The South was swept out of the playoffs in the quarter finals with defending champion Schwäbisch Hall Unicorns upset at home by the Berlin Adler. Ironically it was the fourth placed finisher in the South, Rhein-Neckar Bandits, who came closest to a semifinal berth by keeping the deficit against Braunschweig to a single score. All other northern entrants won their quarterfinals with big margins. On their way home, the Berlin Adler players earned negative press attention as they tried (and failed) to steal a plastic cow at a highway rest stop, damaging it in an attempt to fit it through the bus door. After their first ever playoff home game, Dresden would thus be gifted a second one in the same season by their old rival Berlin Adler. Referencing the cow incident, Dresden had a similar plastic cow displayed in the stadium for the playoff game against the Adler. Ultimately, both home teams prevailed in the semifinals, Braunschweig knocking out the previous season's German Bowl loser Kiel and Dresden dispatching the Adler. The German Bowl would thus include a representative from the New States of Germany for the first time while Braunschweig made its record thirteenth German Bowl appearance after their 2009–2012 "wilderness years" during which they had been far from championship contention.

Quarterfinals
N1	New Yorker Lions	28
S4	Rhein-Neckar Bandits	21
S2	Marburg Mercenaries	9
N3	Kiel Baltic Hurricanes	47
S1	Schwäbisch Hall Unicorns	13
N4	Berlin Adler	42
N2	Dresden Monarchs	59
S3	Munich Cowboys	14

Semifinals
N1	New Yorker Lions	34
N3	Kiel Baltic Hurricanes	29
N4	Berlin Adler	21
N2	Dresden Monarchs	32

German Bowl
N1	New Yorker Lions	35
N2	Dresden Monarchs	34
