= Hamburg Blue Angels =

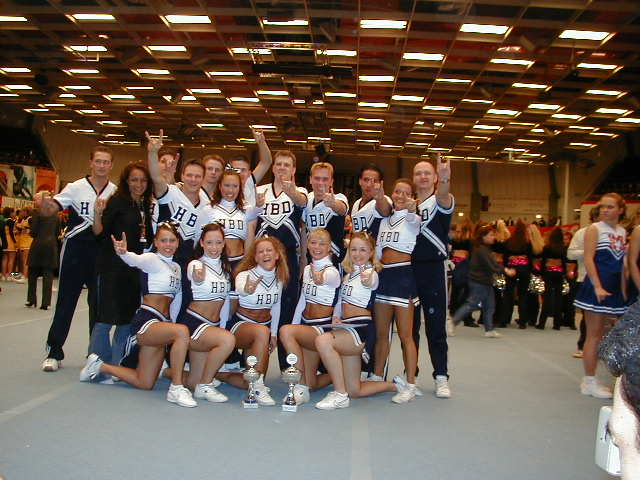
- Hamburg Blue Angels at the DCM 2002 in Leverkusen
- Sport: Cheerleading
- Founded: 1992
- Based in: Hamburg, Germany

The Hamburg Blue Angels are a cheerleading squad for the Hamburg Blue Devils American football team in Hamburg, Germany. They were founded along with the team in 1992.

== General ==
The team is a coed squad of both men and women. They cheer for the Devils in the eVendi Arena and also at many other events. They also participate in national and international cheerleading sport competitions during winter.

== Successes ==
The squad is one of the most successful in Germany, having won the German Championship in 1996, 1999, and 2001, German runner-up prize in 1994, 1995, 1997, 2002 and 2006, the European Championship in 1995, 1996, and 1997, the NCA-Championship in 1998 and 1999, as well as fourth place at the 2001 world championships in Japan.

== Other information ==
Jasmin Wagner (the singer Blümchen), as well as Bianca Hanif (Super Moonies) and Gabriela Gottschalk (first with the Super Moonies and now Hot Banditoz) began their careers as cheerleaders for the Blue and Grey Angels.

== Additional squads ==
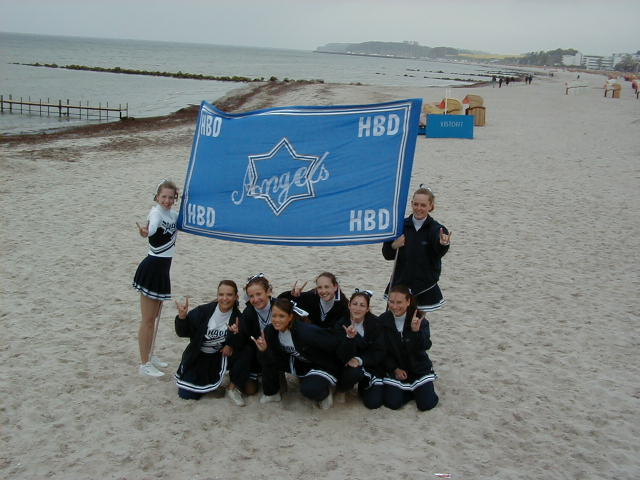
Hamburg Junior Angels 2002 in Grömitz

In addition to the Hamburg Blue Angels the following squads are also linked to the Hamburg Blue Devils:

- Hamburg Grey Angels (Senior All-Girl)
- Hamburg Junior Angels (Junior All-Girl)
- Peewee Angels (Peewee All-Girl)
- Hamburg Blue Devils Dance Team (Senior Dance)
