= Hamburg Huskies =

American football team based in Germany

- Founded: 1994
- League: Oberliga Nord
- Team history: Hamburg Wild Huskies (1995–2003) Hamburg Eagles (2004–2009) Hamburg Huskies (2010–present)
- Based in: Hamburg, Germany
- Stadium: Hammer Park
- Colors: Silver, White and Black
- Owner: Harvesterhuder Tennis und Hockey Club
- President: Timo Müller
- Head coach: Kirk Heidelberg
- Website: hamburghuskies.de

The Hamburg Huskies are an American football team in Hamburg, Germany. The club's greatest success came in 2014 when it won the northern division of the German Football League 2 and earned promotion to the German Football League.

== History ==
The club was formed in 1994 as the Hamburg Wild Huskies. The club entered competitive football in 1995, won the tier four Oberliga and earned promotion to the Regionalliga. In 1998 the club earned promotion to the 2. Bundesliga, a league later renamed to GFL2. In reference to the Hamburg Silver Eagles, a club that went defunct shortly after the formation of the Huskies and provided many of its future players, the Wild Huskies were renamed Eagles in November 2003. Under this name the club won the northern division of the GFL2 for the first time in 2007. In the following promotion round to the GFL the Eagles lost both games to the Dresden Monarchs and missed out on promotion. Also in the 2007 season the team switched from its mother club SC Victoria Hamburg to the Harvesterhuder Tennis und Hockey Club (HTHC). In 2009 the club switched its name to the current Hamburg Huskies but also suffered relegation to the third division Regionalliga. After two seasons at this level the Huskies returned to the GFL2 from 2012 onwards.

After winning the northern division title of the GFL2 in 2014 the club qualified for the first time in its 20-year history for the GFL. It finished fourth in the northern division of the GFL and lost to the Schwäbisch Hall Unicorns in the quarter-finals of the play-offs.

== Honours ==
- GFL
  - League membership: (4) 2015–2018
  - Play-off qualification: (1) 2015
- GFL2
  - Northern Division champions: 2007, 2014
- German Junior Bowl
  - Runners-up: 2010

== Recent seasons ==
Recent seasons of the Huskies:

Year	Division	Finish	Points	Pct.	Games	W	D	L	PF	PA	Postseason
2012	GFL2 (North)	4th	16–12	0.571	14	8	0	6	356	370	—
2013	GFL2 (North)	3rd	15–13	0.536	14	7	1	6	443	363	—
2014	GFL2 (North)	1st	23–5	0.821	14	11	1	2	461	308	—
2015	GFL (North)	4th	10–14	0.417	12	5	0	7	225	309	Lost QF: Schwäbisch Hall Unicorns (13–61)
2016	GFL (North)	6th	8–20	0.286	14	4	0	10	370	629	—
2017	GFL (North)	6th	8–20	0.286	14	4	0	10	196	543	—
2018	GFL (North)	8th	0–28	0.000	14	0	0	14	157	499	Lost RR: Düsseldorf Panther (10–36 & 21–34)
2019	GFL2 (North)	6th	14–14	0.500	14	7	0	7	399	340	—
2020	GFL2 (North)	No season played because of the COVID-19 pandemic									
2021	GFL2 (North)	7th	2–18	0.111	9	1	0	8	111	309	—
2022	GFL2 (North)	8th	0–20	0.000	10	0	0	10	153	467	—
2023	Oberliga Nord	4th	6–10	0.375	8	3	0	5	85	277	—

- PR = Promotion round
- RR = Relegation round
- QF = Quarter finals
