= Lübeck Cougars =

- Founded: 1987
- League: Regionalliga
- Based in: Lübeck
- Stadium: Buniamshof
- Colors: Red and White
- Owner: American Sports Club Lübeck e.V.
- President: Michael Wischendorf
- Head coach: Perez Mattison
- Cheerleaders: Cats Cheerleader
- Mascot: Cody Cougar
- Website: luebeck-cougars.de

The Lübeck Cougars are an American football team from Lübeck, Germany.

The club had its greatest success in 2012 when it played in the German Football League for a season.

== History ==
The club was formed in 1987 out of the members of an earlier American football club in Lübeck, the Outlaws, which went defunct the year before.

The Cougars entered league football in 1990, playing in Landesliga Nord for a season before earning promotion to the Regionalliga Nord. After three seasons in the Regionalliga the club was promoted to the 2. American football Bundesliga, now the German Football League 2 but lasted for only one season before returning to the Regionalliga.

The next seven seasons the Cougars played either in the Regionalliga or the Oberliga below before making a return to the 2. Bundesliga in 2001. The club played nine seasons in this league, renamed to GFL2 at the end of the 2007 season and was finally promoted to the German Football League in 2011 when the Mönchengladbach Mavericks folded in the off-season and an additional place in the league became available.

The Cougars lasted for only one season at the highest level, coming last in the league and losing in the promotion/relegation round to the Cologne Falcons. Back in the GFL2 the club came only fifth in 2013 but improved in 2014, finishing second, its best-ever finish in the league. It repeated this result in 2015.

== Honours ==
- GFL
  - League membership: 2012

== Recent seasons ==
Recent seasons of the Cougars:

Year	Division	Finish	Points	Pct.	Games	W	D	L	PF	PA	Postseason
2010	GFL2 (North)	5th	13–15	0.464	14	6	1	7	367	406	—
2011	GFL2 (North)	3rd	11–9	0.550	10	5	1	4	213	189	—
2012	GFL (North)	8th	3–25	0.107	14	1	1	12	239	579	Lost RR: Cologne Falcons (42–36 & 10–37)
2013	GFL2 (North)	5th	13–15	0.464	14	6	1	7	350	314	—
2014	GFL2 (North)	2nd	19–9	0.679	14	9	1	4	573	478	—
2015	GFL2 (North)	2nd	19–9	0.679	14	9	1	4	547	448	—
2016	GFL2 (North)	4th	16–12	0.571	14	8	0	6	496	303	—
2017	GFL2 (North)	6th	9–19	0.321	14	4	1	9	275	403	—
2018	GFL2 (North)	6th	12–16	0.429	14	6	0	8	258	330	—
2019	GFL2 (North)	2nd	20–8	0.714	14	10	0	4	418	337	—
2020	GFL2 (North)	No season played because of the COVID-19 pandemic									
2021	GFL2 (North)	6th	5–15	0.250	10	2	1	7	196	266	—
2022	GFL2 (North)	4th	14–6	0.700	10	7	0	3	292	254	—
2023	GFL2 (North)	5th	8–12	0.400	10	4	–	6	288	406	—
2024	GFL2 (North)	5th	6–14	0.300	10	3	–	7	211	275	—
2025	GFL2 (North)	7th	2–18	0.100	10	1	–	9	159	385	—

- PR/RR = Promotion/relegation round.
- QF = Quarter finals.
- SF = Semi finals.
- GB = German Bowl.
