= Hermann-Löns-Stadion =

Multi-purpose stadium in Paderborn, Germany

- Interactive map of Hermann-Löns-Stadion
- Full name: Hermann-Löns-Stadion
- Location: Paderborn, Germany
- Coordinates: 51°45′24″N 8°42′2″E
- Owner: City of Paderborn
- Capacity: 11,723

Construction
- Opened: 1957

Tenant
- Paderborn Dolphins (2008- )

The Hermann-Löns-Stadion is a multi-purpose stadium in Paderborn, Germany located in the area Schloß Neuhaus and was opened in 1957. It had a capacity of up to 12,000 and was the home stadium of SC Paderborn 07 football club up until 2008 when it was replaced by the Benteler-Arena.

Since 2008 it has been used as the home stadium for American football team Paderborn Dolphins.

It is also used by TSV Schloss Neuhaus for its offices and as one of its sports venues.

The stadium is named after the German poet Hermann Löns.
