= Cologne Crocodiles =

American football team from Cologne, Germany

- Founded: 1980
- League: German Football League
- Based in: Cologne, Germany
- Colors: Green and Yellow
- Championships: German Bowl: 2000 Junior Bowl: 1983, 1993, 2014, 2015, 2019
- Website: cologne-crocodiles.de

The Cologne Crocodiles are an American football team from Cologne, Germany.

The club's greatest success came in 2000, when it won the German Bowl for the first and, so far, only time. Prior to this, the club had made five losing appearances in the championship game, stretching from 1982 to 1997.

The club, a long-term member of the German Football League, became insolvent in 2003, folded and reformed. For a number of years after that it operated a youth department before fielding a senior team once more beginning in 2009.

== History ==
=== Early years ===
The Cologne Crocodiles were formed in 1980, making it one of the oldest American football clubs in Germany. The club, in its first season, took part in the Nordwestdeutsche Football Liga, a renegade league which only existed for two seasons, 1980 and 1981.

The club joined the American Football Bundesliga in 1981, in the third year of the league's existence, and were an instant success in this league, finishing second in their division and reaching the play-off semi finals. The club's second season was even more successful, winning their division with only one loss all season, against future arch-rival Düsseldorf Panther, and reaching their first-ever German Bowl. In this game however, the Ansbach Grizzlies were the stronger side and the Crocodiles would suffer their first of five German Bowl defeats.

The club remained a strong side in the northern division of the Bundesliga the following seasons, but had the misfortune of being in the same division with the all-dominating Düsseldorf Panther. Finishing second behind the team from Düsseldorf, the club then had to face southern power house Ansbach Grizzlies in the semi-finals and was knocked out on each occasion in 1981, 1983 and 1984.

In 1985, the Crocodiles were less successful, finishing only third and being knocked out in the quarter-finals, the year after the club didn't qualify for the play-offs at all, something it experienced only three times in its 23 seasons at the elite level. The 1987 season saw another quarter final exit, followed by missing the post season once more in 1988. To make matters worse, local rival Red Barons Cologne defeated the Düsseldorf Panther in the German Bowl that year and brought home the first senior national title in the sport to Cologne.

=== Golden era ===
In 1989, the Crocodiles exited the play-offs in the round of 16, while the Red Barons made another, this time losing, Bowl appearance. With this, however, the tables would turn, with the local rival disappearing from the league in 1991 and the Crocodiles reaching the play-off semi finals, as a minimum, in every one of the next eleven seasons. In 1990 and 1991, the club reached the German Bowl but lost both times to the Berlin Adler, close at the first attempt (interception late in the game called back which led to a late Adler score) and by a point at the second. After a semi final defeat to the Munich Cowboys in 1992, the team faced the same opposition in the 1993 German Bowl. The Crocodiles were leading for most of the game but the Cowboys equalised shortly before the end and eventually won the game in extra time.

In 1994, the Adler were once more the stronger side in the two teams semi final encounter, the following two years after it was the Düsseldorf Panther. In 1997, the club made its fifth German Bowl appearance, but the Braunschweig Lions took home the title with a 26–23 victory. The same team also defeated the club in the 1998 semi finals, followed by a semi final loss to the Hamburg Blue Devils in 1999.

The 2000 season was to be the Crocodiles best-ever. Suffering only one defeat all season, to the Panther, the team reached the German Bowl for the sixth time and, this time, won the upper hand, defeating the Lions by two points. It was also the end of an era, with the Crocodiles rapidly declining from here.

=== Decline ===
In 2001, the club came only fourth in its division and suffered its first quarter final exit since 1989, losing to the Cowboys. Doing better in the league in 2002, the team nevertheless lost in the quarter-finals once more, this time to the Stuttgart Scorpions. The final season in the league now renamed the German Football League saw the team win only one game all season and finish in fifth place, a point and a rank above the relegation spot.

Despite having qualified on the field for the 2004 GFL season, the club was unable to participate, instead becoming insolvent. The senior team was withdrawn altogether but the Crocodiles survived and continued, fielding youth teams only for the next five years. The following year, Cologne received an NFL Europe team, the Cologne Centurions, keeping American football at top level alive.

=== Revival ===
The club re-entered senior football in 2009, joining the lowest regional league, the tier-six Landesliga North Rhine-Westphalia South. It won all its eight games there and earned promotion to the Verbandsliga for 2010. With only one defeat at that level, the club was able to move up once more and played in the tier-four Oberliga in 2011.

In 2012, the club experienced some further success, its youth team making a losing appearance in the Junior Bowl while the senior side won the Oberliga and earned promotion to the Regionalliga. In the 2013 Regionalliga season the club won its division and earned the right to promotion to the GFL 2. The club competed in the northern division of the GFL 2 in 2014. After two seasons at that level with records of 8–6, they posted a record of 13–1 in the 2016 season, easily qualifying for the promotion round against the Düsseldorf Panther.

After a losing the 2012 and 2013 German Junior Bowl finals the Crocodiles won the 2014 edition against old rival Düsseldorf Panthers and defended their title in 2015.

== Honours ==
- German Bowl
  - Champions: 2000
  - Runners-up: 1982, 1990, 1991, 1993, 1997
- Ladies Bowl
  - Runners-up: 1998
- Junior Bowl
  - Champions: 1983, 1993, 2014, 2015, 2019
  - Runners-up: 1982, 2012, 2013, 2016
- EFL
  - Participations: 1999, 2000
- GFL
  - Northern Division champions: 1982, 1993, 2000
  - Play-off qualification: (23) 1981–1985, 1987, 1989–2002, 2018, 2021, 2022
  - League membership: (28) 1981–2003, 2017–2022

== German Bowl appearances ==
The club's appearances in the German Bowl:

Bowl	Date	Champions	Runners-Up	Score	Location	Attendance
IV	November 2, 1982	Ansbach Grizzlies	Cologne Crocodiles	12–6	Essen	10,000
XII	October 20, 1990	Berlin Adler	Cologne Crocodiles	50–38	Düsseldorf	10,000
XIII	October 5, 1991	Berlin Adler	Cologne Crocodiles	22–21	Hamburg	13,000
XV	September 25, 1993	Munich Cowboys	Cologne Crocodiles	42–36 (aet)	Munich	9,000
XIX	October 4, 1997	Braunschweig Lions	Cologne Crocodiles	26–23	Hamburg	14,800
XXII	October 7, 2000	Cologne Crocodiles	Braunschweig Lions	31–29	Braunschweig	20,312

- Champions in **bold**.

== Recent seasons ==
Recent seasons of the club:

**Year**	**Division**	**Finish**	**Points**	**Pct.**	**Games**	**W**	**D**	**L**	**PF**	**PA**	**Postseason**
2003	GFL (North)	5th	3–21	0.125	12	1	1	10	114	342	—
2009	Landesliga NRW South	1st	16–0	1.000	8	8	0	0	244	31	**Won** PR: Sauerland Mustangs (24–28 & 19–0)
2010	Verbandsliga NRW	1st	14–2	0.875	8	7	0	1	251	99	—
2011	Oberliga NRW	4th	6–14	0.300	10	3	0	7	178	187	—
2012	Oberliga NRW	1st	18–2	0.900	10	9	0	1	236	79	—
2013	Regionalliga West	1st	16–4	0.800	10	8	0	2	384	109	—
2014	GFL2 (North)	3rd	16–12	0.571	14	8	0	6	489	402	—
2015	GFL2 (North)	4th	16–12	0.571	14	8	0	6	379	329	—
2016	GFL2 (North)	1st	26–2	0.929	14	13	0	1	560	183	**Won** PR: Düsseldorf Panther (34–0 & 28–0)
2017	GFL (North)	5th	12–16	0.429	14	6	0	8	373	390	—
2018	GFL (North)	4th	15–13	0.536	14	7	1	6	376	403	Lost QF: Schwäbisch Hall Unicorns (37–14)
2019	GFL (North)	5th	14–14	0.500	14	7	0	7	251	314	—
2020	GFL (North)	No season played because of the COVID-19 pandemic									
2021	GFL (North)	3rd	12–8	0.600	10	6	0	4	319	278	Lost QF: Saarland Hurricanes (35–16)
2022	GFL (North)	3rd	14–6	0.700	10	7	0	3	386	243	**Won** QF: Munich Cowboys (34–31) Lost SF: Potsdam Royals (21–49)
2023	GFL (North)	Crocodiles did not compete. Withdrawal before the season started.									

- PR = Promotion round
- QF = Quarter finals
- SF = Semi finals
