= Ingolstadt Dukes =

American football team in Ingolstadt, Bavaria, Germany

- Founded: 2007
- League: German Football League
- Based in: Ingolstadt
- Colors: White and Black
- Owner: TV 1861 Ingolstadt
- President: Bettina Ritter
- Head coach: Eugen Haaf
- Website: in-dukes.de

The Ingolstadt Dukes are a German American football team from Ingolstadt, Bavaria.

The club, formed in 2007, experienced its greatest success in 2016 when it won promotion to the German Football League, the top tier of league football in Germany.

== History ==
The Ingolstadt Dukes were formed on 8 October 2007 at the club house of TV 1861 Ingolstadt, which became the parent organisation for the American football club. The early seasons of the new club were spent in nearby Manching as the Dukes were unable to secure a permanent home in Ingolstadt.

The Dukes first season, in 2008, was spent in the tier eight Aufbauliga Bayern where it finished fourth and last in its division. It spent the following year in the Landesliga Bayern where it finished first and remained unbeaten all season. The club rose to the Verbandsliga for 2010, won this league, too, and played in the Bayernliga in 2011. After another league title there the Dukes entered the tier three Regionalliga Süd from 2012. Three seasons at this level followed in which the club improved season by season.

In 2014, the Dukes won the Regionalliga, remaining unbeaten throughout and earned promotion to the German Football League 2 for the first time after a play-off victory over Regionalliga Mitte runners-up Langen Knights. The team finished second in the southern division of the GFL2 in 2015.

In 2016, the Dukes made their step to the German Football League.

At the end of their first season, 2017, the Dukes ranked 4th. In the playoff-quarterfinal the Dukes lost against Braunschweig Lions.

== Logo and name ==
The club's logo results from the cities car number plates which start with In. The club's name, the Dukes, comes from the fact that Ingolstadt was once the capital of the Duchy of Bavaria-Ingolstadt.

== Honours ==
- GFL
  - Play-off qualification: 2017, 2023
  - League membership: 2017–2019, 2023
- GFL2
  - Champions: 2016, 2022
- Regionalliga Süd
  - Champions: 2014, 2021
- Bayernliga
  - Champions: 2011
- Verbandsliga Bayern-Süd
  - Champions: 2010
- Landesliga Bayern
  - Champions: 2009

== Recent seasons ==
Recent seasons of the Dukes:

Year	Division	Finish	Points	Pct.	Games	W	D	L	PF	PA	Postseason
2012	Regionalliga Süd	3rd	10–10	0.500	10	5	0	5	307	176	—
2013	Regionalliga Süd	2nd	16–4	0.800	10	8	0	2	366	114	Lost PR: Holzgerlingen Twister (6–6 & 23–24)
2014	Regionalliga Süd	1st	24–0	1.000	12	12	0	0	521	195	Won PR: Langen Knights (42–25 & 53–7)
2015	GFL2 (South)	2nd	22–6	0.786	14	11	0	3	476	182	—
2016	GFL2 (South)	1st	28–0	1.000	14	14	0	0	565	169	Won PR: Rhein-Neckar Bandits (41–6 & 60–0)
2017	GFL (South)	4th	14–14	0.500	14	7	0	7	399	406	Lost QF: New Yorker Lions (6–47)
2018	GFL (South)	6th	9–19	0.321	14	4	1	9	350	401	—
2019	GFL (South)	5th	10–18	0.357	14	5	0	9	298	433	—
2020	GFL (South)	No season played because of the COVID-19 pandemic									
2021	Regionalliga Süd	1st	12–0	1.000	6	6	0	0	282	119	Won PR: Gießen Golden Dragons (35–22) Won PR: Pforzheim Wilddogs (48–0)
2022	GFL2 (South)	1st	20–0	1.000	10	10	0	0	445	147	Won PR: Frankfurt Universe (withdrew)
2023	GFL (South)	4th	12–12	0.500	12	6	–	6	387	340	Lost QF: Potsdam Royals (0–54)
2024	Landesliga Bayern (5th)										

- PR = Promotion round.
- QF = Quarter finals.

== Players ==
The current kicker and punter for the Dukes is Zane Davis, from Charlotte, North Carolina. He is currently attending UNC Chapel Hill.
