= Paderborn Dolphins =

- Founded: 1991
- League: Regionalliga
- Based in: Paderborn
- Arena: Hermann-Löns-Stadion
- Colors: Black and gold
- President: David Schmidtmann
- Head coach: Jason Irmscher
- Championships: none
- Website: paderborn-dolphins.de

The Paderborn Dolphins are an American football team from Paderborn, Germany.

The club's greatest success has been promotion, in 1997, to the American football Bundesliga, now the German Football League, where it played for two seasons until 1999.

After winning the GFL2 North in 2022, the Dolphins returned to the top level of Germany in 2023 the German Football League for another three seasons.

== History ==
The Dolphins entered league football in 1992 when they joined the tier-four Verbandsliga. The club spent two seasons at this level before earning promotion to the Regionalliga, where it played until 1995. After promotion from the Regionalliga to the 2nd Bundesliga the Dolphins finished sixth in the league in 1996 before winning its division in 1997 led by USA Import quarterback Bradly Strohm. In the promotion round the club defeated Bundesliga foundation club Berlin Adler, ending the latter's nineteen-season stint in the league since 1979.

In the Bundesliga the Dolphins' sole victory in the 1998 season came away at the Stuttgart Scorpions in an interconference match but the club defended its league place in the relegation round against 2. Bundesliga club Berlin Rebels. The season after, playing as AFC Paderborn, the club's results were stricken from the table after it found itself unable to complete its fixtures and was consequently relegated.

The club, again as the Dolphins, returned to the tier-three Regionalliga from 2000 onwards, playing the next three seasons at that level. At the end of the 2002 season it withdrew from league football and restarted again in the Verbandsliga in 2004. Two unbeaten seasons in 2004 and 2005 took the team back to the Regionalliga, where it played for the next nine seasons from 2006 to 2014. It won league championships at this level in 2008 and 2014, remaining unbeaten on both occasions. In 2008 it missed out on promotion when it lost to the Hildesheim Invaders in the promotion round but, in 2014, a draw against the Osnabrück Tigers followed by victory over the Potsdam Royals took the club back to the second tier after a fourteen-year absence.

In 2015, the team finished third in the German Football League 2, the former 2nd Bundesliga.

== Honours ==
- German Football League
  - League membership: (5) 1998–1999, 2023–2025
- German Football League 2
  - Northern division champions: 1997, 2022

== Recent seasons ==
Recent seasons of the club:

Year	Division	Finish	Points	Pct.	Games	W	D	L	PF	PA	Postseason
2014	Regionalliga West	1st	20–0	1.000	10	10	0	0	392	99	Drew PR: Osnabrück Tigers (56–56) Won PR: Potsdam Royals (38–15)
2015	GFL2 (North)	3rd	16–12	0.571	14	8	0	6	455	322	—
2016	GFL2 (North)	2nd	20–8	0.714	14	10	0	4	534	408	—
2017	GFL2 (North)	5th	11–17	0.393	14	5	1	8	333	470	—
2018	GFL2 (North)	7th	6–22	0.214	14	3	0	11	317	487	—
2019	Regionalliga West	3rd	16–6	0.727	12	9	0	3	235	155	—
2020	Regionalliga West	No season played because of the COVID-19 pandemic									
2021	Regionalliga West	1st	9–1	0.900	5	4	1	0	177	49	Won PR: Spandau Bulldogs (34–15) Won PR: Hildesheim Invaders (32–0)
2022	GFL2 (North)	1st	16–4	0.800	10	8	0	2	234	144	Won PR: Düsseldorf Panther (13–7 & 8–13)
2023	GFL (North)	6th	6–18	0.250	12	3	–	9	184	432	—
2024	GFL (North)	7th	10–14	0.417	12	5	–	7	188	355	—
2025	GFL (North)	8th	2–22	0.083	12	1	–	11	186	542	Won RR: Hamburg Pioneers (38–14 & 27–28)

- RR = Relegation round
- PR = Promotion round
- QF = Quarter finals
- SF = Semi finals
