= Stuttgart Scorpions =

American football team in Germany

- Founded: 1982
- League: German Football League
- Based in: Stuttgart, Germany
- Stadium: Gazi-Stadion auf der Waldau
- Colors: Red and White
- President: Roland Pellegrino
- Championships: none
- Website: stuttgart-scorpions.de

The Stuttgart Scorpions are an American football team from Stuttgart, Germany. The club's greatest success came in 2007, when it reached the German Bowl but lost to the Braunschweig Lions.

== History ==
Even though the Stuttgart Scorpions are among Germany's oldest active American Football clubs, formed in December 1982 by Harold Kienitz, they were only the second team in town as the Stuttgart Stallions were founded in 1980 and remained the leading outfit in the region until the mid-1980s, playing in Germany's top-level league. The new club, using the facilities of the SSC Stuttgart and later the TuS Stuttgart 1867 e. V., spent its first couple of seasons in the 2nd Bundesliga, now the German Football League 2, where it played until 1985.

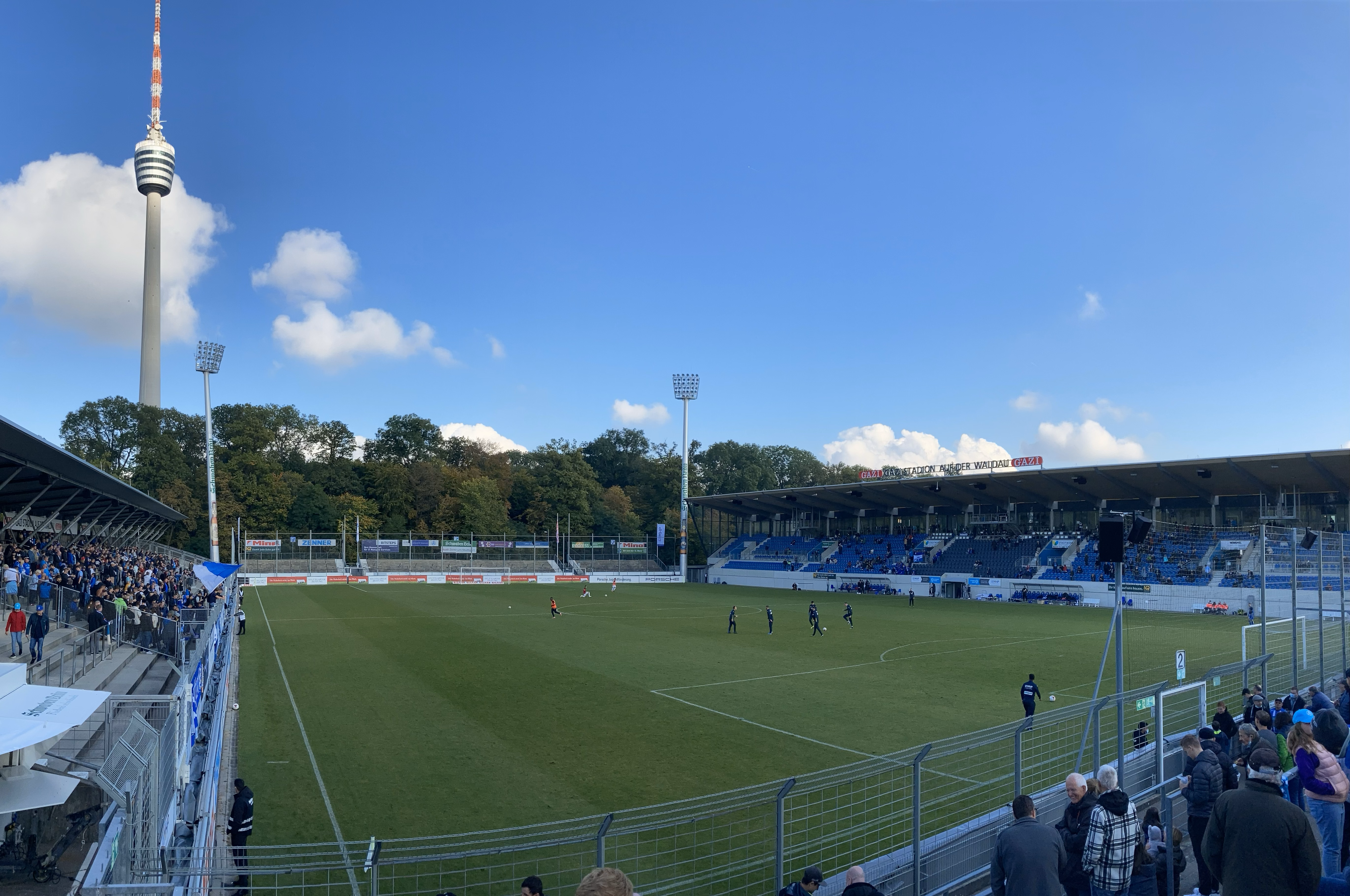
Germany's oldest stadium, Waldau-Stadion, is situated under the world's first telecommunications tower

The Scorpions, after having earned promotion, spent the 1986 and 1987 season in the central division of the four-division American Football Bundesliga in then West Germany, now the German Football League, but was only able to win one game in two years and found itself relegated back to the second tier for 1988. At this league, the team once more was a top performer and won two division titles in 1990 and 1991, with the later also earning promotion to the Bundesliga once more. In 1990, with East Germany still existing, Stuttgart organised an exhibition game in Leipzig, beating the 1st League Badener Greifs in front of 11,000 spectators. In 1991, the Scorpions hosted a Stuttgart Allstars Bowl Game at Waldau Stadium against US College players coached by Sam Rutigliano, while the World League of American Football (WLAF, later NFL Europe) played its first season with the Frankfurt Galaxy representing Germany, giving Football much more media coverage.

By now, the first generation self-taught players moved on to be coaches, officials, or otherwise involved in organisation and promotion of the game, thus young players were much better prepared when they joined the senior teams of their clubs.

The Scorpions once more struggled at top level and were immediately relegated again. Coming second in 1993 behind the Frankfurt Gamblers, the second generation of Germany's oldest Football club Frankfurter Löwen, merely secured their place in the 2nd league as the top-tier league was in a process of getting slimmed down from four divisions in former West Germany to two divisions that now covered united Germany. After winning the division the following year, the Scorpions were able to defeat the Franken Knights 47–0 in the promotion round and moved up for a third time in their history.

The club was now much improved, could match the top-level teams, and reached the quarter-finals in its first two seasons back, 1995 and 1996. After a difficult 1997 season, when survival was only assured in the relegation round against the Saarland Hurricanes, the Scorpions would finally be able to deliver constant top-level performances. From 1998 onwards, the team was to reach the play-offs every season.

The Stuttgart Scorpions won the southern division of the Bundesliga in 1998 and were able to reach the semi-finals of the German championship for the first time. In 2001, 2002 and 2006, this play-off performance was repeated, in between, the club was knocked out in the semi-finals. The 2007 season was to be the club's best-ever, first winning the southern division of the GFL for only the second time and then progressing all the way to the German Bowl. In this game, played at home in Stuttgart, the Scorpions were defeated 27–6 by the Braunschweig Lions who won four consecutive German Bowls in that era, 12 over all.

Since then, the team's performances have fallen off, only being able to reach the quarter-finals of the championship in 2008, 2009 and 2010. In 2011, the side finished third in its division, qualifying for the play-offs once more, where they lost to the Mönchengladbach Mavericks.

In 2012, the club came fourth in the southern division of the GFL and qualified for the play-off where it was knocked out by Kiel Baltic Hurricanes in the quarter-finals. After 15 consecutive play-off qualifications the club came only sixth in 2013 and missed the finals for the first time since 1997.

In 2014, the club finished second in the southern division of the GFL but lost 28–33 to the Cologne Falcons in the quarter-finals of the play-offs. After a third-place finish in 2015 the club lost to the Dresden Monarchs in the quarter-finals of the play-offs.

In 2021, the Scorpions received an offer to become a franchise of the newly established European League of Football (ELF) which sees itself as a continuation of World League of American Football (WLAF, 1991–92) and NFL Europe. A 2/3 majority of the member base rejected the offer, but management and coaching staff decided to join the Stuttgart ELF franchise. Since the Scorpions rejected an ELF cooperation, and the 40+ year old name of the Stuttgart Stallions was not used either, the name of the WLAF "Sacramento Surge" (1992 World Bowl champion and all-time 3–0 against Frankfurt Galaxy) was revived as "Stuttgart Surge" to continue the rivalry with Frankfurt. The Scorpions remain a constituent of the GFL. Sharing the same location with the Surge, the Scorpions lost several players to the ELF team. This resulted in three seasons ending in consecutive relegations.

== Honours ==
- German Bowl
  - Runners-up: 2007
- EFL
  - Participations: 2008
- GFL
  - Southern Division champions: (2) 1998, 2007
  - Play-off qualification: (20) 1995, 1996, 1998–2012, 2014, 2015, 2019
  - League membership: (29) 1986–1987, 1992, 1995–2021
- GFL2
  - Central Division champions: 1985, 1990, 1991, 1994
- Junior Bowl
  - Runners-up: 1992, 1999, 2001, 2007, 2008

== German Bowl appearances ==
The club has only appeared once in the German Bowl:

Bowl	Date	Champions	Runners-Up	Score	Location	Attendance
XXIX	October 6, 2007	**Braunschweig Lions**	Stuttgart Scorpions	27–6	Stuttgart	8,152

- Champions in **bold**.

== Recent seasons ==
Recent seasons of the Scorpions:

**Year**	**Division**	**Finish**	**Points**	**Pct.**	**Games**	**W**	**D**	**L**	**PF**	**PA**	**Postseason**
2005	GFL (South)	3rd	10–10	0.500	10	5	0	5	353	343	Lost QF: Hamburg Blue Devils (0–30)
2006	GFL (South)	2nd	17–7	0.708	12	8	1	3	407	190	**Won** QF: Dresden Monarchs (47–27) Lost SF: Braunschweig Lions (17–36)
2007	GFL (South)	1st	20–4	0.833	12	10	0	2	390	144	**Won** QF: Hamburg Blue Devils (27–17) **Won** SF: Berlin Adler (19–14) Lost GB: Braunschweig Lions (6–27)
2008	GFL (South)	2nd	16–8	0.667	12	8	0	4	302	195	Lost QF: Berlin Adler (6–9)
2009	GFL (South)	3rd	11–13	0.458	12	5	1	6	331	302	Lost QF: Kiel Baltic Hurricanes (6–20)
2010	GFL (South)	4th	8–16	0.333	12	4	0	8	228	280	Lost QF: Kiel Baltic Hurricanes (21–23)
2011	GFL (South)	3rd	15–11	0.577	13	7	1	5	316	335	Lost QF: Mönchengladbach Mavericks (17–43)
2012	GFL (South)	4th	18–10	0.643	14	8	2	4	344	271	Lost QF: Kiel Baltic Hurricanes (22–70)
2013	GFL (South)	6th	9–19	0.321	14	4	1	9	272	430	—
2014	GFL (South)	2nd	24–4	0.857	14	12	0	2	560	477	Lost QF: Cologne Falcons (28–33)
2015	GFL (South)	3rd	20–8	0.714	14	10	0	4	429	342	Lost QF: Dresden Monarchs (14–55)
2016	GFL (South)	5th	14–14	0.500	14	7	0	7	474	387	—
2017	GFL (South)	6th	8–20	0.286	14	4	0	10	227	403	—
2018	GFL (South)	8th	4–24	0.143	14	2	0	12	226	486	**Won** RR: Ravensburg Razorbacks (72–34 & 48–6)
2019	GFL (South)	4th	12–16	0.429	14	6	0	8	328	473	Lost QF: New Yorker Lions (3–70)
2020	GFL (South)	No season played because of the COVID-19 pandemic									
2021	GFL (South)	8th	2–18	0.100	10	1	0	9	128	457	Lost RR: Straubing Spiders (withdrawal)
2022	GFL2 (South)	6th	6–14	0.300	10	3	0	7	136	261	—
2023	GFL2 (South)	8th	2–18	0.100	10	1	–	9	95	331	—
2024	Regionalliga										

- RR = Relegation round.
- QF = Quarter finals.
- SF = Semi finals.
- GB = German Bowl
