= Nürnberg Rams =

German American football team: Nürnberg Rams

- Founded: 1981 & 2007 (reformed)
- League: Regionalliga (3rd level)
- Team history: Nürnberg Rams (1981–1987) Noris Rams (1988–1998) Nürnberg Rams (2007–present)
- Based in: Nuremberg
- Stadium: Zeppelinfeld
- Colors: Navy Blue and White
- Owner: Nürnberg Rams American Sports e.V.
- Head coach: Josh Alaeze
- Website: www.nuernberg-rams.com

The Nürnberg Rams are an American football team from Nuremberg (German: Nürnberg) Germany.

The original Nürnberg Rams club was formed in 1981 and renamed to Noris Rams in 1987. It played in the American football in the Bundesliga League, now the German Football League, from 1983 to 1998, reaching the play-off semifinals as its greatest success in 1987. The club became defunct in 1998 but was reformed in 2007.

== History ==
The origins of the Nürnberg Rams go back to early 1981 when two players of the Ansbach Grizzlies began forming an American football team in Nuremberg. In September 1981 this team joined local sports club TSV 1846 Nürnberg and, in 1982 the Rams joined the 2. Bundesliga, the second tier of American football in Germany. The Rams won this league in its first season and earned promotion to the Bundesliga. The club spent the next sixteen seasons at this level, reaching the play-offs in all but two of those years.

The Rams qualified for the play-offs in their inaugural 1983 Bundesliga season but were knocked out in the quarterfinals, a fate the club would suffer in twelve of its fourteen play-off appearances. The second season saw the club struggle and nominally being relegated from the Bundesliga but eventually saved by the demise of the Frankfurter Löwen. After this season, from 1985 to 1997 the club would qualify for the play-offs each year. In 1986 the club split from TSV 1846 Nürnberg and joined ASN Pfeil Nürnberg instead, which forced a rename to Noris Rams for the following season as TSV retained the naming rights. The 1987 seasons saw the club's greatest success, reaching the semifinals of the play-off for the first and only time where it was knocked out by the Berlin Adler.

The following season the Rams were knocked out in the first round of the play-offs, the only year they did not advance to the quarterfinals. From 1989 to 1997 the Rams reached the quarterfinals each year and won the southern division title in 1989, 1991 and 1996 without ever reaching or even winning a German Bowl. The club's demise came after the 1998 season when the Rams did not win a game all season, were relegated and folded.

After a hiatus of nine years a new Nürnberg Rams club was formed in 2007 and entered the lowest level of competition, the Aufbauliga, in 2008. The new club won promotion in every season from 2008 to 2011 and quickly climbed the league pyramid from the sixth to the second tier. Since 2012 the club plays in the German Football League 2, the former 2. Bundesliga.

== Honours ==
- GFL
  - Southern Division champions: 1987, 1989, 1991, 1996
  - League membership: (16) 1983–1998
  - Play-off qualification: (14) 1983, 1985–1997
- German Junior Bowl
  - Runners-up: 1985

== Recent seasons ==
Recent seasons of the Rams:

Year	Division	Finish	Points	Pct.	Games	W	D	L	PF	PA	Postseason
2012	GFL2 (South)	4th	15–13	0.536	14	7	1	6	336	320	—
2013	GFL2 (South)	3rd	17–11	0.607	14	8	1	5	404	325	—
2014	GFL2 (South)	4th	16–12	0.571	14	8	0	6	364	316	—
2015	GFL2 (South)	4th	16–12	0.571	14	8	0	6	466	397	—
2016	GFL2 (South)	4th	15–13	0.536	14	7	1	6	483	449	—
2017	GFL2 (South)	3rd	16–8	0.667	12	8	0	4	525	349	—
2018	GFL2 (South)	4th	16–12	0.571	14	8	0	6	467	509	—
2019–2024	team played in the Regionalliga (3rd tier)										
2025	GFL2 (South)	6th	8–12	.400	10	4	–	6	206	321	—

- PR = Promotion round.
- QF = Quarterfinals.
- SF = Semifinals.
- GB = German Bowl.
