= Cologne Falcons =

German American football team

- Founded: 1994
- League: Regionalliga West
- Based in: Cologne, Germany
- Stadium: Sportpark Müngersdorf, Ostkampfbahn
- Colors: Black, Red and Gold
- President: Oliver Over
- Head coach: Martin Hanselmann
- Championships: Junior Bowl: 2011, 2012
- Mascot: Captain Falcon
- Website: www.cologne-falcons.de

The Cologne Falcons are an American football team from Cologne, Germany. The Falcons currently play most of their home games at Müngersdorf Sportpark, Ostkampfbahn.

The team was founded in 1994 by former members of the Red Barons Cologne, which went defunct in 1991. Initially, the club stood in the shadow of the much more successful Cologne Crocodiles, but after the Crocodiles went bankrupt in 2003, the Falcons managed to become the dominant football club in Cologne. From 2005 on, the team played in the German Football League, before being relegated in 2008. In 2006, they made their only playoff-off appearance, but lost against the Marburg Mercenaries in the first round.

In more recent years, the Falcons struggled in their performances and in 2010 and 2011, the finished sixth in the GFL2, before finishing the 2012 season as first in the league and winning the following relegation game against the Lübeck Cougars, thus being promoted to the GFL again for the 2013 season. While achieving success with the senior team, the youth department of the Falcons was also able gain attention by winning the 2011 and 2012 German Junior Bowl. 2014 the Cologne Falcons finished third in the league and were qualified for the play-offs, but lost in the semifinals to New Yorker Lions who won the 2014 Championship afterwards.

== History ==
In 1994, former members of the Red Barons Cologne, a Cologne-based football club that existed from 1981 to 1991, gathered to found the Cologne Falcons. One year later, the team competed in league football for the first time, starting in the sixth tier Landesliga North Rhine-Westphalia. After three seasons there, the Falcons joined the Verbandsliga. The first year in the league were not very successful for the club, but this changed from 2000. After winning the championship in the Verbandsliga and the following promotion, the team entered the Oberliga and managed to win the championship there in the 2001 season, thus being promoted to the Regionalliga West.

The clubs progress was temporarily halted in 2002 when it came only sixth in the Regionalliga. In the 2003 season, the team managed to win the league and move up to the 2nd Bundesliga. In its first season in the second league, the club won the Northern Conference and consequently was being promoted to the Bundesliga, the highest tier in German American Football.

The 2005 season did not bring much success for the Falcons, as the team finished the league fifth in the Northern Conference, only evading relegation by leaving the Düsseldorf Panther behind. A year later, the team managed to come fourth in the league, thus reaching the play-offs for the first time in the club's history. However, they lost their first game round against the Marburg Mercenaries with 0–62.

The following 2007 season again was not very successful for the team. They finished fifth, only winning one game against the Dresden Monarchs. The decline of the Falcons was continued in the 2008 season, when the team finished last in the Northern Conference and lost the following relegation games against the Assindia Cardinals.

After a good 2009 season when the team came second in the league the Falcons declined, coming sixth in 2010 and 2011. In 2012, the club was able to win the northern division of the GFL2, earning the right to play last placed GFL team Lübeck Cougars for a place in the GFL in 2013. After losing the home game 36–42 the Falcons won in Lübeck 37–10 and earned promotion.

Prior to the 2012 season, the Falcons underwent a major change. The club was rebranded as AFC Köln Falcons, dropping the English version of Cologne from its name and adopting the German version. Furthermore, the team emblem was changed and the club presented new shirts, but a year later the club returned to its old name.

The 2013 season saw the club come last in its division but narrowly defend its league membership in the relegation round against the Bielefeld Bulldogs. In the following year the club fared much better. Martin Hanselmann who signed in the middle of the season 2013 continued as the head coach in 2014. 2014 the Cologne Falcons finished third in the league and were qualified for the play-offs. They defeated the Stuttgart Scorpions 33–28 in the quarter-finals, but lost in the semifinals to New Yorker Lions who won the 2014 Championship afterwards. Corresponding to the most successful season in Cologne Falcons' history, the club celebrated its 25th anniversary. By the end of the current season the Cologne Falcons became sixth place in Europe's Top 20.

In March 2015, one month before the start of the new season the Falcons informed the GFL that they were financially unable to compete in the GFL in 2015, thereby withdrawing from the league, instead competing in the tier four Oberliga Nordrhein-Westfalen in 2015, which the club won, earning promotion to the Regionalliga West.

== Facilities ==
=== Stadiums ===
As of 2012, the first team of the Falcons plays most of their games at the Südstadion, located in the Kölner Neustadt-Süd. The stadium has a capacity of 12,000 people and is shared with SC Fortuna Köln, a soccer club currently playing in the Fußball-Regionalliga West. Unlike the first squad, the second team and the youth teams all play at the Ostkampfbahn, which is the training ground for all Falcons teams. Since 2013 the Ostkampfbahn is the home of all Falcons including the GFL-Team.

=== Training ===
The Falcons practice at the Ostkampfbahn, a small football field located in the Sülz area. It is placed next to the RheinEnergieStadion, home of the 1. FC Köln, the cities most famous and successful soccer club.

== Honours ==
- EFL
  - Participations: 2014
- GFL
  - League membership: (6) 2005–2008, 2013–2014
  - Play-off qualification: 2006, 2014
- GFL2
  - Northern Division champions: 2004, 2012
- Junior Bowl
  - Champions: 2011, 2012
  - Runners-up: 2009

== Recent seasons ==
Recent seasons of the club:

Year	Division	Finish	Points	Pct.	Games	W	D	L	PF	PA	Postseason
2005	GFL (North)	5th	10–14	0.417	12	5	0	7	178	324	—
2006	GFL (North)	4th	11–13	0.458	12	5	1	6	248	333	Lost QF: Marburg Mercenaries (0–62)
2007	GFL (North)	5th	6–18	0.250	12	3	0	9	210	377	—
2008	GFL (North)	6th	5–19	0.208	12	2	1	9	206	286	Lost RR: Assindia Cardinals (17–24 & 23–28)
2009	GFL2 (North)	2nd	18–10	0.643	14	9	0	5	295	253	—
2010	GFL2 (North)	6th	7–21	0.250	14	3	1	10	303	498	—
2011	GFL2 (North)	6th	3–17	0.150	10	1	1	8	47	216	—
2012	GFL2 (North)	1st	22–6	0.786	14	11	0	3	480	262	Won RR: Lübeck Cougars (36–42 & 37–10)
2013	GFL (North)	8th	4–20	0.143	14	2	0	12	209	503	Won RR: Bielefeld Bulldogs (42–30 & 6–17)
2014	GFL (North)	3rd	14–10	0.583	12	7	0	5	345	352	Won QF: Stuttgart Scorpions (33–28); Lost SF: New Yorker Lions (3–52)
2015	Oberliga Nordrhein-Westfalen (4th level)	1st	18–0	1.000	9	9	0	0	305	93	—
2016	Regionalliga West (3rd level)	5th	8–12	0.400	10	4	0	6	189	224	—
2017	Regionalliga West (3rd level)	5th	8–12	0.400	10	4	0	6	141	200	—
2018	Regionalliga West (3rd level)	3rd	15–9	0.625	12	7	1	4	227	167	—
2019	Regionalliga West (3rd level)	5th	8–16	0.333	12	4	0	8	145	293	—

- RR = Relegation round
- PR = Promotion round
- QF = Quarter finals
- SF = Semi finals
- GB = German Bowl
