= Hamburg Blue Devils =

American football team in Hamburg, Germany

- Founded: 1992
- League: Regionalliga Nord
- Based in: Hamburg, Germany
- Stadium: Adolf-Jäger-Kampfbahn
- Colors: Navy blue
- Head coach: Florian Mundele
- Championships: Eurobowl: 1996–1998; German Bowl: 1996, 2001–2003
- Cheerleaders: Blue Angels
- Website: www.bluedevils.hamburg

The Hamburg Blue Devils are an American football team in Hamburg, Germany. It was founded in 1992. The Blue Devils are one of the most successful American football clubs in Germany, having won four German Bowls as well as three Eurobowls. During the late 1990s and early 2000s, the clubs rivalry with the Braunschweig Lions dominated the game in the German Football League, with the two sides meeting in six German Bowls between 1998 and 2005 as well as the 1999 Eurobowl.

In the late 1990s, the club had become the most financially successful American football club in Europe, but by 2003, the club had to declare insolvency.

== History ==
The Hamburg Blue Devils were formed in 1992 and began playing non-league football in September 1992. It continued to take part in tournaments in 1993, defeating a number of European top clubs, including the German champions, the Munich Cowboys.

In 1994, the Blue Devils took part in the Football League of Europe, where they lost the final to the Stockholm Nordic Vikings, played in front of 18,000 in Hamburg.

Unusually, the club was admitted to the American Football Bundesliga, the later German Football League, without having worked its way up through the league system in 1995 and reached the German Bowl in its first attempt. There however, the Düsseldorf Panthers proved too strong and Hamburg lost 10–17.

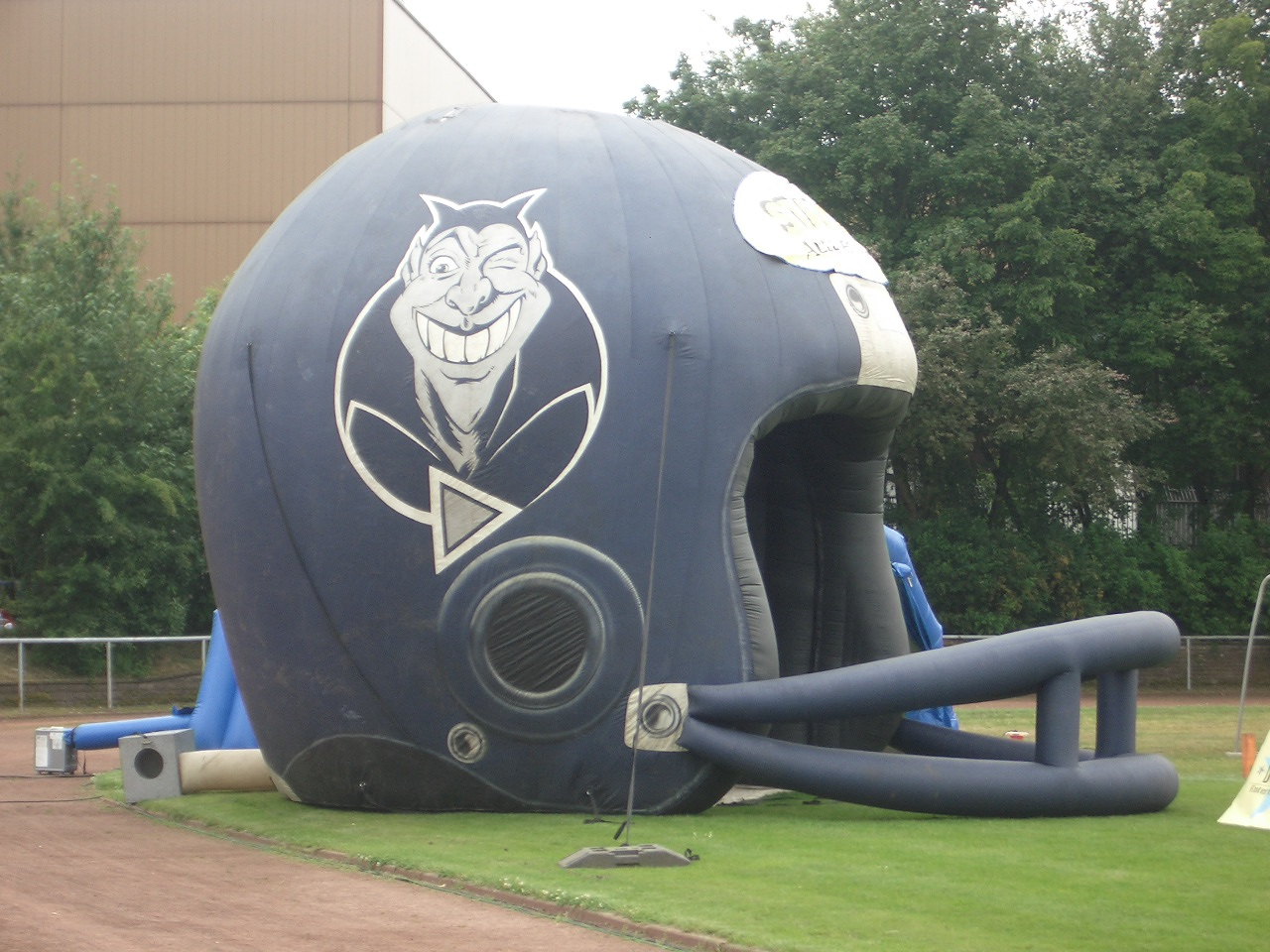
eVendi-Arena

The club's second season in the league brought triumphs and sadness. The team won both the German Bowl and the Eurobowl, however, the team's head coach since 1992, George White, died two days before the play-off semi finals. In 1997, the Blue Devils were able to defend their European Football League title by winning the Eurobowl, but lost in the semi-finals of the national championships. Finally, in 1998, the club won the Eurobowl for a third consecutive time, as the first club ever, but once more lost the German Bowl, to future bitter rival Braunschweig Lions.

The 1999 season was all about the Blue Devils versus the Lions, the two teams meeting both in the Eurobowl and the German Bowl. On both occasions, the Lions kept the upper hand, but the 30,000 that turned out to see the German Bowl at Hamburgs Volksparkstadion were a new record for the game in Germany.

The following season 2000 was a disaster for the club. With new coach and quarter back, the club played its first losing season in its short history and missed the play-offs. It did reach the Eurobowl playoffs once more but this time lost to the Bergamo Lions.

With a new coach and playing at the Millerntor-Stadion, the club began a new era of success in 2001. Three German Bowl victories were to follow, all against the Braunschweig Lions. However, not all went well for the club. Midway through the 2002 season, the coach left but the Blue Devils remained successful. In 2003, the club experienced financial trouble, having to declare insolvency. Despite this, the German Bowl was won in extra time in a narrow 37–36 victory.

The club somewhat declined from 2004 onwards, only reaching the quarter-finals that year. In 2005, a last appearance in the German Bowl was made, but this time the Lions came out as the winners. Additionally, the clubs marketing agency had to declare insolvency, too, but the Blue Devils survived theirs and moved into their own stadium, the eVendi Arena. From 2005 to 2007, the club also faced some local competition in the form of NFL Europe team Hamburg Sea Devils.

From 2006 onwards, the performances of the Blue Devils dropped off. In 2006, the play-off semi finals could still be reached, in 2007 it was only the quarter-finals and, in 2008, a fifth place meant the club did not play a post season at all. What followed was the withdrawal to the tier-three Regionalliga Nord, where the club played the 2009 and 2010 season without ever suffering a league defeat. However, in the promotion round, things were not as easy and the Blue Devils missed out on promotion in 2009 but were successful in 2010. In 2011, the club has risen to the second tier of German football, the GFL 2, a league it never played in before.

On 5 January 2011, the club announced that it would start a cooperation with the Hamburger SV with the aim of becoming a department of the club and, eventually, from 1 January 2012, all teams of the Blue Devils would become part of the multi-sports club HSV. The idea was floated as early as 1992 and the club will, in future, be known as the HSV Hamburg Blue Devils. In 2012, the club came seventh in the northern division of the GFL and failed to qualify for the play-off.

In January 2014 the club announced that it would withdraw its team from the GFL because of a loss of players and would restart in 2015. After not fielding a senior team in 2014 the club returned to league football for 2015, entering the tier five Verbandsliga Nord, where they finished third.

== Teams ==
Apart from the senior men's team, the Blue Devils also operate a reserve side, a junior team, the Hamburg Junior Devils, ladies team, the Hamburg Blue Devilyns and a flag team, the Hamburg Flag Devils.

== Honours ==
- Eurobowl
  - Champions: 1996–1998
  - Runners-up: 1999, 2000
- German Bowl
  - Champions: 1996, 2001–2003
  - Runners-up: 1995, 1998, 1999, 2005
- EFL
  - Participations: (7) 1996–2000, 2000, 2006
- GFL
  - Northern Division champions: 1997, 2001
  - Play-off qualification : (12) 1995–1999, 2001–2008
  - League membership : (16) 1995–2008, 2012–2013
- GFL 2
  - Northern Division champions: 2011
- Junior Bowl
  - Champions: 1999

== German Bowl appearances ==
The club's appearances in the German Bowl:

Bowl	Date	Champions	Runners-Up	Score	Location	Attendance
XVII	September 16, 1995	Düsseldorf Panther	Hamburg Blue Devils	17–10	Braunschweig	12,125
XVIII	October 5, 1996	Hamburg Blue Devils	Düsseldorf Panther	31–12	Hamburg	19,700
XX	October 3, 1998	Braunschweig Lions	Hamburg Blue Devils	20–14	Hamburg	22,100
XXI	October 9, 1999	Braunschweig Lions	Hamburg Blue Devils	25–24	Hamburg	30,400
XXIII	October 6, 2001	Hamburg Blue Devils	Braunschweig Lions	31–13	Hanover	23,193
XXIV	October 12, 2002	Hamburg Blue Devils	Braunschweig Lions	16–13	Braunschweig	21,097
XXV	October 11, 2003	Hamburg Blue Devils	Braunschweig Lions	37–36 (aet)	Wolfsburg	20,517
XXVII	October 8, 2005	Braunschweig Lions	Hamburg Blue Devils	31–28	Hanover	19,512

== Recent seasons ==
Recent seasons of the Blue Devils:

Year	Division	Finish	Points	Pct.	Games	W	D	L	PF	PA	Postseason
2005	GFL (North)	2nd	14–6	0.700	10	7	0	3	224	119	Won QF: Stuttgart Scorpions (30–0) Won SF: Marburg Mercenaries (42–41 aet) Lost GB: Braunschweig Lions (28–31)
2006	GFL (North)	2nd	16–8	0.667	12	8	0	4	356	215	Won QF: Schwäbisch Hall Unicorns (34–13) Lost SF: Marburg Mercenaries (20–33)
2007	GFL (North)	4th	14–10	0.583	12	7	0	5	305	219	Lost QF: Stuttgart Scorpions (17–27)
2008	GFL (North)	5th	12–12	0.500	12	6	0	6	201	185	—
2009	Regionalliga Nord; 3rd level	1st	24–0	1.000	12	12	0	0	466	53	Lost PR: Mönchengladbach Mavericks (13–19 & 12–21)
2010	Regionalliga Nord; 3rd level	1st	20–0	1.000	10	10	0	0	333	104	Lost PR: Potsdam Royals (26–27) Won PR: Troisdorf Jets (28–7)
2011	GFL 2 (North)	1st	18–2	0.900	10	9	0	1	260	80	—
2012	GFL (North)	7th	4–24	0.143	14	2	0	12	257	586	—
2013	GFL (North)	6th	8–20	0.286	14	4	0	10	225	448	—
2014	inactive										
2015	Verbandsliga Nord; 5th level	3rd	8–8	0.500	8	4	0	4	197	122	
2016	Verbandsliga Nord; 5th level	2nd	18–2	0.900	10	9	0	1	455	65	
2017	Oberliga Nord; 4th level	1st	18–0	1.000	9	9	0	0	313	149	Won PR: Hamburg Black Swans 51–6 Won PR: Kiel Baltic Hurricanes II 33–0
2018	Regionalliga Nord; 3rd level	3rd	16–12	0.571	14	8	6	0	327	195	
2019	Regionalliga Nord; 3rd level	7th	7–17	0.250	12	3	8	1	267	353	
2020	Regionalliga Nord; 3rd level	No season played because of the COVID-19 pandemic									
2021	Regionalliga Nord; 3rd level	3rd	4–8	0.333	6	2	4	0	112	237	—

- PR = Promotion round.
- QF = Quarter finals.
- SF = Semi finals.
- GB = German Bowl.

== Charity bowls ==
The Blue Devils victory against St. Xavier University in 1995 was one of the first success for a European team against a US college team. The Devils also won against US college teams in 1997 and 1998.

The first known European victory against a US college team was in 1991. The Graz Giants of the Austrian Football League winning a game 32–23 against Albany University. The game was played in the United States on August 31, 1991.

Year	Home team	Guest team	Score	Attendance
1993	Hamburg Blue Devils	Pacific Lutheran Lutes	18–42	15,200
1993	Findlay Oilers	Hamburg Blue Devils	28–7	5,950
1994	Hamburg Blue Devils	Findlay Oilers]	14–21	11,000
1995	Hamburg Blue Devils	St. Xavier Cougars	20–0	10,000
1996	Hamburg Blue Devils	Illinois Wesleyan Titans	7–37	14,200
1997	Hamburg Blue Devils	Benedictine Ravens	18–13	11,400
1997	Florida State Seminoles alumni	Hamburg Blue Devils	20–15	?
1998	Hamburg Blue Devils	US Allstars	17–10	10,700
1999	Hamburg Blue Devils	Kristianstad C4 Lions (Sweden)	72–0	6,700
2000	Hamburg Blue Devils	Notre Dame Fighting Irish alumni	10–14	18,500
