= Holzgerlingen Twister =

- Founded: 1997
- League: Regionalliga Mitte
- Based in: Holzgerlingen
- Colors: Black and Yellow
- President: Sascha Blumenhagen
- Head coach: Patrick Schober
- Championships: none
- Website: www.holzgerlingen-twister.de

The Holzgerlingen Twister are an American football team from Holzgerlingen, Germany.

The club's greatest success has been promotion to the German Football League 2 in 2009 and 2013, where it played for five seasons until 2015.

== History ==
The Holzgerlingen Twister entered league football in 1998, joining the tier five Verbandsliga. After a championship in a season without defeat Holzgerlingen moved up to the Oberliga where it played for the next six seasons until 2004. A runners-up finish took the club up to the Regionalliga Mitte but it was relegated back to the Oberliga after just two seasons.

Two Oberliga seasons followed in which the second one produced another league championship and a return to the Regionalliga for 2009. The club finished runners-up in the league in 2009 and, through an aggregate victory over the Kirchdorf Wildcats in the promotion round, moved up to the German Football League 2 for the first time. Holzgerlingen played at the second tier of the German league system for the next three seasons with a third place in 2011 as its best result. The season after the club was however relegated back to the Regionalliga.

The 2013 season saw the team come second in the Regionalliga again and once more enter the promotion round to the GFL2. Facing the Regionalliga Süd champions Ingolstadt Dukes the club drew six-all in the first leg before overcoming Ingolstadt 24–23 in the return leg and thereby earning another promotion. Back in the GFL2 it finished fifth in 2014 and sixth in 2015, on both occasions avoiding the relegation ranks. At the end of the 2015 season however the club opted to withdraw back to the Regionalliga for 2016.

== Honours ==
- German Football League 2
  - League membership: (5) 2009–2012, 2014–2015

== Recent seasons ==
Recent seasons of the club:

Year	Division	Finish	Points	Pct.	Games	W	D	L	PF	PA	Postseason
2013	Regionalliga Mitte	2nd	18–2	.900	10	9	0	1	336	95	Won PR: Ingolstadt Dukes (6–6 & 24–23)
2014	GFL2 (North)	5th	14–14	.500	14	7	0	7	326	294	—
2015	GFL2 (North)	6th	6–22	.214	14	3	0	11	214	435	—
2021	Regionalliga Südwest	5th	4–8	.333	6	2	0	4	119	162	—

- RR = Relegation round
- PR = Promotion round
- QF = Quarter finals
- SF = Semi finals
- GB = German Bowl
