= American football Regionalliga =

- Sport: American football
- Founded: 1985; 41 years ago
- Administrator: AFVD
- No. of teams: 42
- Country: Germany
- Most recent champion: North: Hildesheim Invaders East: Spandau Bulldogs West: Paderborn Dolphins Central: Gießen Golden Dragons Southwest: Pforzheim Wilddogs South: Ingolstadt Dukes
- Level on pyramid: Level 3
- Related competitions: German Football League 2

The American football Regionalliga is the third tier of American football in Germany, below the German Football League and the German Football League 2.

The league is subdivided into six regional divisions, the Regionalligas (English: Regional league) Nord (North), Ost (East), West, Mitte (Central), Südwest (Southwest) and Süd (South).

== History ==
The league was formed in 1985 with two regional divisions, Central and West. The number of divisions changed frequently in the following years, as did the name of the league, changing to Verbandsliga for a time. From 1991 it operated under name of Regionalliga again with seven divisions, one in the North and two each in the West, Central and Bavaria. From 1995 the league was reduced to four divisions, South, West, Central and Northeast, a format that remained unchanged until 2004 when the Northeast division was split into North and East divisions. Since 2004 the Regionalliga operates in the current five division format.

== Organisation ==
The five Regionalligas are organised by the regional American football associations rather than the American Football Association of Germany, like the Regionalliga Süd which is organised by the Bavarian one.

In the 2015 season 33 clubs compete in the league, nine in the central division and six each in the other four.

The top teams of the Regionalliga divisions qualify for the play-offs to the German Football League . The division champions and runners-up of the Central and South division play each other home and away for two promotion spots to the southern division of the German Football League 2, whereby the division winner from one plays the runners-up from the other. In the north, the three division winners of the North, West and East division play each other in a single game round robin for two spots in the northern division of the GFL 2. Promotion is subject to licensing approval and can be enlarged if additional spots in the German Football League 2 become available. An overall Regionalliga championship is not played.

The bottom teams from each division are relegated and replaced with the top teams from the tier below, the American football Oberliga.

== Division champions ==
The division champions since adaption of the current structure in 2004:

=== Northern region ===
Year	North	East	West
2004	Osnabrück Tigers	**Berlin Rebels**	Troisdorf Jets
2005	Osnabrück Tigers	Frankfurt Red Cocks	**Assindia Cardinals**
2006	**Weyhe Vikings**	**Frankfurt Red Cocks**	Bonn Gamecocks
2007	Magdeburg Virgin Guards	Leipzig Lions	**Assindia Cardinals**
2008	**Hildesheim Invaders**	Magdeburg Virgin Guards	Paderborn Dolphins
2009	Hamburg Blue Devils	**Magdeburg Virgin Guards**	**Mönchengladbach Mavericks**
2010	**Hamburg Blue Devils**	Potsdam Royals	**Troisdorf Jets**
2011	**Osnabrück Tigers**	**Cottbus Crayfish**	**Bonn Gamecocks**
2012	Lübeck Seals	**Rostock Griffins**	**Bielefeld Bulldogs**
2013	**Hildesheim Invaders**	Tollense Sharks	**Cologne Crocodiles**
2014	Osnabrück Tigers	**Potsdam Royals**	**Paderborn Dolphins**
2015	**Ritterhude Badgers**	Rostock Griffins	**Assindia Cardinals**
2016	Braunschweig FFC II	**Rostock Griffins**	**Langenfeld Longhorns**
2017	**Elmshorn Fighting Pirates**	Berlin Bears	**Solingen Paladins**
2018	**Hannover Spartans**	Spandau Bulldogs	**Troisdorf Jets**
2019	Oldenburg Knights	**Berlin Adler**	**Assindia Cardinals**
2020	—	—	—
2021	**Hildesheim Invaders**	Spandau Bulldogs	**Paderborn Dolphins**
2022	Oldenburg Knights	Spandau Bulldogs	Münster Blackhawks

=== Southern region ===
The division champions and runners-up since adaption of the structure in 2004:

Year	Central		South	
Year	Winners	Runners-up	Winners	Runners-up
2004	Weinheim Longhorns	Stuttgart Silver Arrows	Königsbrunn Ants	Deggendorf Black Hawks
2005	**Jena Hanfrieds**	Obertshausen Blizzards	**Plattling Black Hawks**	Rosenheim Rebels
2006	Kaiserslautern Pikes	Stuttgart Silver Arrows	**Aschaffenburg Stallions**	Franken Timberwolves
2007	**Stuttgart Silver Arrows**	**Montabaur Fighting Farmers**	Erding Bulls	Franken Timberwolves
2008	**Kaiserslautern Pikes**	**Rhein Neckar Bandits**	Aschaffenburg Stallions	Starnberg Argonauts
2009	**Hanau Hornets**	**Holzgerlingen Twister**	Kirchdorf Wildcats	Allgäu Comets
2010	**Badener Greifs**	**Frankfurt Pirates**	**Kirchdorf Wildcats**	Allgäu Comets
2011	**Kaiserslautern Pikes**	**Frankfurt Universe**	**Allgäu Comets**	**Nürnberg Rams**
2012	**Ravensburg Razorbacks**	Badener Greifs	Fursty Razorbacks	**Starnberg Argonauts**
2013	**Darmstadt Diamonds**	**Holzgerlingen Twister**	Straubing Spiders	Ingolstadt Dukes
2014	Albershausen Crusaders	Langen Knights	**Ingolstadt Dukes**	**München Rangers**
2015	**Ravensburg Razorbacks**	**Gießen Golden Dragons**	Straubing Spiders	Neu-Ulm Spartans
2016	**Albershausen Crusaders**	Holzgerlingen Twister	**Fursty Razorbacks**	Straubing Spiders

- **Bold** denotes promoted teams.

The division champions since adaption of the current structure in 2017:

Year	Central	Southwest	South
2017	**Montabaur Fighting Farmers**	Pforzheim Wilddogs	**Straubing Spiders**
2018	**Darmstadt Diamonds**	**Biberach Beavers**	Fursty Razorbacks
2019	**Frankfurt Pirates**	Albershausen Crusaders	**Fursty Razorbacks**
2020	**Bad Homburg Sentinels**	Albershausen Crusaders	—
2021	**Gießen Golden Dragons**	Pforzheim Wilddogs	**Ingolstadt Dukes**
2022	Montabaur Fighting Farmers	Pforzheim Wilddogs	Regensburg Phoenix

- **Bold** denotes promoted teams.

== Current clubs ==
The Regionalliga clubs for the 2022 season:

Regionalliga Nord
Braunschweig Lions II
Bremerhaven Seahawks
Hamburg Blue Devils
Hamburg Pioneers
Hannover Grizzlies
Oldenburg Knights
Wolfsburg Blue Wings

Regionalliga Ost
Berlin Rebels II
Berlin Thunderbirds
Cottbus Crayfish
Dresden Monarchs II
Erfurt Indigos
Jenaer Hanfrieds
Leipzig Lions
Magdeburg Virgin Guards
Spandau Bulldogs

Regionalliga West
Bielefeld Bulldogs
Bonn Gamecocks
Cologne Falcons
Düsseldorf Bulldozer
Münster Blackhawks
Troisdorf Jets

Regionalliga Mitte
Bad Kreuznach Thunderbirds
Kaiserslautern Pikes
Mainz Golden Eagles
Montabaur Fighting Framers
Rüsselsheim Crusaders

Regionalliga Südwest
Albershausen Crusaders
Biberach Beavers
Freiburg Sacristans
Holzgerlingen Twister
Pforzheim Wilddogs
Weinheim Longhorns

Regionalliga Süd
Erding Bulls
Landsberg X-press
München Rangers
Munich Cowboys II
Nürnberg Rams
Regensburg Phoenix
