= 1995 NFL draft =

National Football League draft

General information
- Date: April 22–23, 1995
- Location: Paramount Theatre at MSG in New York City, New York
- Network: ESPN

Overview
- 249 total selections in 7 rounds
- League: NFL
- First selection: Ki-Jana Carter, RB; Cincinnati Bengals
- Mr. Irrelevant: Michael Reed, CB; Carolina Panthers
- Most selections (13): San Diego Chargers
- Fewest selections (4): San Francisco 49ers
- Hall of Famers: 6: OT Tony Boselli; DT Warren Sapp; CB Ty Law; LB Derrick Brooks; RB Curtis Martin; RB Terrell Davis

The 1995 NFL draft was the procedure by which National Football League teams selected amateur college football players. It is officially known as the NFL Annual Player Selection Meeting. The draft was held April 22–23, 1995 at the Paramount Theatre at Madison Square Garden in New York City, New York. The league also held a supplemental draft after the regular draft and before the regular season.

The draft was the first with the expansion Carolina Panthers and Jacksonville Jaguars franchises, who each received two extra picks between the first and second rounds. The Panthers, having selected second in the 1995 NFL expansion draft, were awarded the first overall pick in the main draft and the Jaguars, who held the first pick in the expansion draft, selected second. However, the Panthers traded their number one pick to the Cincinnati Bengals for the Bengals' fifth overall pick and their fourth pick in the second round. The Bengals used the selection on Ki-Jana Carter, who is the most recent running back taken first overall. The Panthers were also stripped of two supplemental picks for improperly recruiting Pittsburgh Steelers defensive coordinator Dom Capers as their head coach.

In the first round, the Tampa Bay Buccaneers selected future Hall of Fame players Warren Sapp and Derrick Brooks. This was the second of three times two Hall of Fame inductees were selected by the same team in the first round, along with the Chicago Bears in 1965 and the Baltimore Ravens in the following year's draft. Although Sapp was projected to be a top 10 pick, he slid to the 12th selection due to allegations of failed drug tests. He and Brooks would go on to lead the Tampa 2 defense that brought the Buccaneers to their first Super Bowl title in Super Bowl XXXVII.

The draft was also the last to feature a team based in Los Angeles until 2016 due to the Los Angeles Raiders returning to Oakland later in the year. (Note: Although the Raiders returned to Oakland for the 1995 season, they were based in Los Angeles during the draft and did not relocate until after it was held.)

== Player selections ==
*	Compensatory selection
¤	Extra selection awarded to expansion team
†	Pro Bowler
‡	Hall of Famer

Positions key
Offense	Defense	Special teams
QB — Quarterback; RB — Running back; FB — Fullback; WR — Wide receiver; TE — Tight end; OL — Offensive lineman; T — Tackle; G — Guard; C — Center	DL — Defensive lineman; DT — Defensive tackle (Note: Includes nose tackle (NT)); DE — Defensive end; EDGE — Edge rusher; LB — Linebacker (Note: Includes middle linebacker (MLB/MIKE), weakside linebacker (WILL), strongside linebacker (SAM), off-ball linebacker, and outside linebacker (OLB)); DB — Defensive back; CB — Cornerback; S — Safety (Note: Includes free safety (FS) and strong safety (SS))	K — Kicker (Note: Also known as a placekicker (PK)); P — Punter; LS — Long snapper; RS — Return specialist (Note: Includes kickoff and punt returners)

Rnd.	Pick	Team	Player	Pos.	College	Notes
1	1	Cincinnati Bengals	Ki-Jana Carter	RB	Penn State	from Carolina (Note: No. 1: Carolina → Cincinnati (D). Carolina traded a first-round selection (1st overall) to Cincinnati in exchange for first- and second-round selections (5th and 36th overall).)
1	2	Jacksonville Jaguars	Tony Boselli^{‡}^{†}	T	USC	
1	3	Houston Oilers	Steve McNair ^{†}	QB	Alcorn State	
1	4	Washington Redskins	Michael Westbrook	WR	Colorado	
1	5	Carolina Panthers	Kerry Collins ^{†}	QB	Penn State	from Cincinnati (Note: No. 5: Cincinnati → Carolina (D). See Round 1: Carolina → Cincinnati.)
1	6	St. Louis Rams	Kevin Carter ^{†}	DE	Florida	
1	7	Philadelphia Eagles	Mike Mamula	DE	Boston College	from Tampa Bay (Note: No. 7: Tampa Bay → Philadelphia (D). Tampa Bay traded first- and third-round selections (7th and 72nd overall) to Philadelphia in exchange for a first-round selection and two second-round selections (12th, 43rd and 63rd overall).)
1	8	Seattle Seahawks	Joey Galloway	WR	Ohio State	
1	9	New York Jets	Kyle Brady	TE	Penn State	
1	10	San Francisco 49ers	J. J. Stokes	WR	UCLA	from Atlanta via Cleveland (Note: No. 10: Atlanta → Cleveland → San Francisco. Multiple trades: Atlanta → Cleveland (PD). Atlanta traded a first-round selection (10th overall) to Cleveland in exchange for a first-round selection (26th overall) and RB Eric Metcalf. Cleveland → San Francisco (D). Cleveland traded a first-round selection (10th overall) to San Francisco in exchange for first-, third- and fourth-round selections (30th, 94th and 119th overall) and a 1996 first-round selection.)
1	11	Minnesota Vikings	Derrick Alexander	DE	Florida State	from Denver via Atlanta (Note: No. 11: Denver → Atlanta → Minnesota. Multiple trades: Denver → Atlanta (PD). Denver traded a first-round selection (11th overall) and a 1994 third-round selection to Atlanta in exchange for a seventh-round selection (222nd overall) and WR Mike Pritchard. Atlanta → Minnesota (PD). Atlanta traded a first-round selection (11th overall) and a 1994 second-round selection to Minnesota in exchange for a 1994 second-round selection and DE Chris Doleman.)
1	12	Tampa Bay Buccaneers	Warren Sapp^{‡}^{†}	DT	Miami (FL)	from Philadelphia (Note: No. 12: Philadelphia → Tampa Bay (D). See Round 1: Tampa Bay → Philadelphia.)
1	13	New Orleans Saints	Mark Fields ^{†}	LB	Washington State	
1	14	Buffalo Bills	Ruben Brown ^{†}	G	Pittsburgh	
1	15	Indianapolis Colts	Ellis Johnson	DT	Florida	
1	16	New York Jets	Hugh Douglas ^{†}	DE	Central State	from Arizona (Note: No. 16: Arizona → NY Jets (PD). Arizona traded first- and fourth-round selections (16th and 106th overall) to the NY Jets in exchange for WR Rob Moore.)
1	17	New York Giants	Tyrone Wheatley	RB	Michigan	
1	18	Los Angeles Raiders	Napoleon Kaufman	RB	Washington	
1	19	Jacksonville Jaguars	James Stewart	RB	Tennessee	from Kansas City (Note: No. 19: Kansas City → Jacksonville (D). Kansas City traded a first-round selection (19th overall) to Jacksonville in exchange for first-, third- and fourth-round selections (31st, 97th and 134th overall) and a 1996 fourth-round selection.)
1	20	Detroit Lions	Luther Elliss ^{†}	DT	Utah	
1	21	Chicago Bears	Rashaan Salaam	RB	Colorado	1994 Heisman Trophy Winner
1	22	Carolina Panthers	Tyrone Poole	CB	Fort Valley State	from Green Bay (Note: No. 22: Green Bay → Carolina (D). Green Bay traded first- and sixth-round selections (22nd and 188th overall) to Carolina in exchange for first-, third- and sixth-round selections (32nd, 65th and 173rd overall).)
1	23	New England Patriots	Ty Law^{‡}^{†}	CB	Michigan	
1	24	Minnesota Vikings	Korey Stringer ^{†}	T	Ohio State	
1	25	Miami Dolphins	Billy Milner	T	Houston	
1	26	Atlanta Falcons	Devin Bush Sr.	S	Florida State	from Cleveland (Note: No. 26: Cleveland → Atlanta (PD). See Round 1: Atlanta → Cleveland.)
1	27	Pittsburgh Steelers	Mark Bruener	TE	Washington	
1	28	Tampa Bay Buccaneers	Derrick Brooks^{‡}^{†}	LB	Florida State	from Dallas (Note: No. 28: Dallas → Tampa Bay (D). Dallas traded a first-round selection (28th overall) to Tampa Bay in exchange for two second-round selections (41st and 63rd overall).)
1	29	Carolina Panthers	Blake Brockermeyer	T	Texas	from San Diego (Note: No. 29: San Diego → Carolina (D). San Diego traded a first-round selection (29th overall) to Carolina in exchange for second-, third- and fourth-round selections (34th, 98th and 100th overall).)
1	30	Cleveland Browns	Craig Powell	LB	Ohio State	from San Francisco (Note: No. 30: San Francisco → Cleveland (D). See Round 1: Cleveland → San Francisco.)
1¤	31	Kansas City Chiefs	Trezelle Jenkins	T	Michigan	from Jacksonville (Note: No. 31: Jacksonville → Kansas City (D). See Round 1: Kansas City → Jacksonville.)
1¤	32	Green Bay Packers	Craig Newsome	CB	Arizona State	from Carolina (Note: No. 32: Carolina → Green Bay (D). See Round 1: Green Bay → Carolina.)
2	33	New York Jets	Matt O'Dwyer	G	Northwestern	from Jacksonville (Note: No. 33: Jacksonville → NY Jets (D). Jacksonville traded a second-round selection (33rd overall) to the NY Jets in exchange for second- and third-round selections (40th and 71st overall).)
2	34	San Diego Chargers	Terrance Shaw	CB	Stephen F. Austin	from Carolina (Note: No. 29: Carolina → San Diego (D). See Round 1: San Diego → Carolina.)
2	35	Houston Oilers	Anthony Cook	DE	South Carolina State	
2	36	Carolina Panthers	Shawn King	DE	Northeast Louisiana	from Cincinnati (Note: No. 36: Cincinnati → Carolina (D). See Round 1: Carolina → Cincinnati.)
2	37	Washington Redskins	Cory Raymer	C	Wisconsin	
2	38	St. Louis Rams	Zach Wiegert	T	Nebraska	
2	39	Seattle Seahawks	Christian Fauria	TE	Colorado	
2	40	Jacksonville Jaguars	Brian DeMarco	T	Michigan State	from NY Jets (Note: No. 40: NY Jets → Jacksonville (D). See Round 2: Jacksonville → NY Jets.)
2	41	Atlanta Falcons	Ron Davis	CB	Tennessee	from Tampa Bay via Dallas (Note: No. 41: Tampa Bay → Dallas → Atlanta. Multiple trades: Tampa Bay → Dallas (D). See Round 1: Dallas → Tampa Bay. Dallas → Atlanta (D). Dallas traded a second-round selection (41st overall) to Atlanta in exchange for second- and fourth-round selections (46th and 110th overall).)
2	42	Minnesota Vikings	Orlando Thomas	S	Southwestern Louisiana	from Denver (Note: No. 42: Denver → Minnesota (PD). Denver traded a second-round selection (42nd overall), and 1994 first- and sixth-round selections to Minnesota in exchange for OT Gary Zimmerman.)
2	43	Tampa Bay Buccaneers	Melvin Johnson	S	Kentucky	from Philadelphia (Note: No. 43: Philadelphia → Tampa Bay (D). See Round 1: Tampa Bay → Philadelphia.)
2	44	New Orleans Saints	Ray Zellars	FB	Notre Dame	
2	45	Buffalo Bills	Todd Collins	QB	Michigan	
2	46	Dallas Cowboys	Sherman Williams	RB	Alabama	from Atlanta (Note: No. 46: Atlanta → Dallas (D). See Round 2: Dallas → Atlanta.)
2	47	Arizona Cardinals	Frank Sanders	WR	Auburn	
2	48	Indianapolis Colts	Ken Dilger ^{†}	TE	Illinois	
2	49	Los Angeles Raiders	Barret Robbins ^{†}	C	TCU	
2	50	Philadelphia Eagles	Bobby Taylor ^{†}	CB	Notre Dame	from Kansas City (Note: No. 50: Kansas City → Philadelphia (PD). Kansas City traded a second-round selection (50th overall) and a 1996 sixth-round selection to Philadelphia in exchange for a fourth-round selection (112th overall) and WR Victor Bailey.)
2	51	San Diego Chargers	Terrell Fletcher	RB	Wisconsin	from Detroit (Note: No. 51: Detroit → San Diego (D). Detroit traded a second-round selection (51st overall) to San Diego in exchange for a 1996 first-round selection.)
2	52	Chicago Bears	Pat Riley	DT	Miami (FL)	
2	53	Miami Dolphins	Andrew Greene	G	Indiana	from Green Bay (Note: No. 53: Green Bay → Miami (PD). Green Bay traded a second-round selection (53rd overall) to Miami in exchange for a fourth-round selection (117th overall) and TE Keith Jackson.)
2	54	New York Giants	Scott Gragg	T	Montana	
2	55	Minnesota Vikings	Corey Fuller	CB	Florida State	
2	56	Chicago Bears	Todd Sauerbrun ^{†}	P	West Virginia	from Miami (Note: No. 56: Miami → Chicago (PD). Miami traded second- and third-round selections (56th and 87th overall) to Chicago in exchange for DE Trace Armstrong.)
2	57	New England Patriots	Ted Johnson	LB	Colorado	
2	58	Philadelphia Eagles	Barrett Brooks	T	Kansas State	
2	59	Dallas Cowboys	Kendell Watkins	TE	Mississippi State	
2	60	Pittsburgh Steelers	Kordell Stewart ^{†}	QB	Colorado	
2	61	San Diego Chargers	Jimmy Oliver	WR	TCU	
2	62	St. Louis Rams	Jesse James	G	Mississippi State	from San Francisco (Note: No. 62: San Francisco → St. Louis (PD). San Francisco sent a second-round selection (62nd overall) to St. Louis as compensation for signing restricted free agent CB Marquez Pope.)
2*	63	Dallas Cowboys	Shane Hannah	G	Michigan State	from Philadelphia via Tampa Bay (Note: No. 63: Philadelphia → Tampa Bay → Dallas. Multiple trades: Philadelphia → Tampa Bay (D). See Round 1: Tampa Bay → Philadelphia. Tampa Bay → Dallas (D). See Round 1: Dallas → Tampa Bay.)
2¤	–	Carolina Panthers	Selection forfeited (Note: Carolina forfeited second- and sixth-round selections for illegally approaching Pittsburgh Steelers defensive coordinator Dom Capers to take over as its head coach.)			
2¤	64	Jacksonville Jaguars	Bryan Schwartz	LB	Augustana (SD)	
3	65	Green Bay Packers	Darius Holland	DT	Colorado	from Carolina (Note: No. 65: Carolina → Green Bay (D). See Round 1: Green Bay → Carolina.)
3	66	Green Bay Packers	William Henderson ^{†}	FB	North Carolina	from Jacksonville (Note: No. 66: Jacksonville → Green Bay (PD). Jacksonville traded third- and fifth-round selections (66th and 170th overall) to Green Bay in exchange for QB Mark Brunell.)
3	67	Houston Oilers	Chris Sanders	WR	Ohio State	
3	68	Washington Redskins	Darryl Pounds	CB	Nicholls State	
3	69	Cincinnati Bengals	Melvin Tuten	T	Syracuse	
3	70	Detroit Lions	David Sloan ^{†}	TE	New Mexico	from St. Louis (Note: No. 70: St. Louis → Detroit (D). St. Louis traded a third-round selection (70th overall) to Detroit in exchange for third- and fourth-round selections (82nd and 115th overall).)
3	71	Jacksonville Jaguars	Chris Hudson	S	Colorado	from NY Jets (Note: No. 71: NY Jets → Jacksonville (D). See Round 2: Jacksonville → NY Jets.)
3	72	Philadelphia Eagles	Greg Jefferson	DE	Central Florida	from Tampa Bay (Note: No. 72: Tampa Bay → Philadelphia (D). See Round 1: Tampa Bay → Philadelphia.)
3	73	Green Bay Packers	Brian Williams	LB	USC	from Seattle (Note: No. 73: Seattle → Green Bay (PD). Seattle sent a third-round selection (73rd overall) to Green Bay as compensation for signing restricted free agent S Corey Harris.)
3	74	New England Patriots	Curtis Martin^{‡}^{†}	RB	Pittsburgh	from Philadelphia (Note: No. 74: Philadelphia → New England (PD). Philadelphia sent a third-round selection (74th overall) to New England as compensation for signing restricted free agent RB Kevin Turner.)
3	75	New Orleans Saints	Mike Verstegen	T	Wisconsin	
3	76	Buffalo Bills	Marlon Kerner	CB	Ohio State	
3	77	Atlanta Falcons	Lorenzo Styles	LB	Ohio State	
3	78	Philadelphia Eagles	Chris T. Jones	WR	Miami (FL)	from Denver (Note: No. 78: Denver → Philadelphia (PD). Denver traded a third-round selection (78th overall) and a 1996 fifth-round selection to Philadelphia in exchange for CB Ben Smith.)
3	79	Indianapolis Colts	Zack Crockett	FB	Florida State	
3	80	Arizona Cardinals	Stoney Case	QB	New Mexico	
3	81	Kansas City Chiefs	Tamarick Vanover	WR	Florida State	
3	82	St. Louis Rams	Steve McLaughlin	K	Arizona	from Detroit (Note: No. 82: Detroit → St. Louis (D). See Round 3: St. Louis → Detroit.)
3	83	Chicago Bears	Sean Harris	LB	Arizona	
3	84	Cleveland Browns	Eric Zeier	QB	Georgia	from Green Bay (Note: No. 84: Green Bay → Cleveland (D). Green Bay traded a third-round selection (84th overall) to Cleveland in exchange for third- and fifth-round selections (90th and 160th overall).)
3	85	New York Giants	Rodney Young	CB	LSU	
3	86	Los Angeles Raiders	Joe Aska	RB	Central Oklahoma	
3	87	Chicago Bears	Evan Pilgrim	G	BYU	from Miami (Note: No. 87: Miami → Chicago (PD). See Round 2: Miami → Chicago.)
3	88	New England Patriots	Jimmy Hitchcock	CB	North Carolina	
3	89	Houston Oilers	Rodney Thomas	RB	Texas A&M	from Minnesota (Note: No. 89: Minnesota → Houston (PD). Minnesota traded a third-round selection (89th overall) and a 1994 fourth-round selection to Houston in exchange for QB Warren Moon.)
3	90	Green Bay Packers	Antonio Freeman ^{†}	WR	Virginia Tech	from Cleveland (Note: No. 90: Cleveland → Green Bay (D). See Round 3: Green Bay → Cleveland.)
3	91	Pittsburgh Steelers	Brenden Stai	G	Nebraska	
3	92	Dallas Cowboys	Charlie Williams	CB	Bowling Green	
3	93	San Diego Chargers	Don Sasa	DT	Washington State	
3	94	Cleveland Browns	Mike Frederick	DE	Virginia	from San Francisco (Note: No. 94: San Francisco → Cleveland (D). See Round 1: Cleveland → San Francisco.)
3*	95	Houston Oilers	Torey Hunter	CB	Washington State	
3*	96	Buffalo Bills	Damien Covington	LB	NC State	
3¤	97	Kansas City Chiefs	Troy Dumas	LB	Nebraska	from Jacksonville (Note: No. 97: Jacksonville → Kansas City (D). See Round 1: Kansas City → Jacksonville.)
3¤	98	San Diego Chargers	Preston Harrison	G	Ohio State	from Carolina (Note: No. 98: Carolina → San Diego (D). See Round 1: San Diego → Carolina.)
4	99	Jacksonville Jaguars	Rob Johnson	QB	USC	
4	100	San Diego Chargers	Chris Cowart	LB	Florida State	from Carolina (Note: No. 100: Carolina → San Diego (D). See Round 1: San Diego → Carolina.)
4	101	Houston Oilers	Michael Roan	TE	Wisconsin	
4	102	Cincinnati Bengals	Sam Shade	S	Alabama	
4	103	Washington Redskins	Larry Jones	RB	Miami (FL)	
4	104	San Diego Chargers	Aaron Hayden	RB	Tennessee	from St. Louis (Note: No. 104: St. Louis → San Diego (PD). St. Louis traded a fourth-round selection (104th overall) to San Diego in exchange for CB Marquez Pope.)
4	105	Tampa Bay Buccaneers	Jerry Wilson	S	Southern	
4	106	New York Jets	Melvin Hayes	T	Mississippi State	from Seattle via Arizona (Note: No. 106: Seattle → Arizona → NY Jets. Multiple trades: Seattle → Arizona (PD). Seattle traded a fourth-round selection (106th overall) to Arizona in exchange for WR Ricky Proehl. Arizona → NY Jets (D). See Round 1: Arizona → NY Jets.)
4	107	New York Jets	Tyrone Davis	WR	Virginia	
4	108	New Orleans Saints	Dameian Jeffries	DE	Alabama	
4	109	Buffalo Bills	Ken Irvin	CB	Memphis	
4	110	Dallas Cowboys	Eric Bjornson	WR	Washington	from Dallas (Note: No. 110: Atlanta → Dallas (D). See Round 2: Dallas → Atlanta.)
4	111	Minnesota Vikings	Chad May	QB	Kansas State	from Denver (Note: No. 111: Denver → Minnesota (D). Denver traded a fourth-round selection (111th overall) to Minnesota in exchange for fourth- and sixth-round selections (121st and 196th overall).)
4	112	New England Patriots	Dave Wohlabaugh	C	Syracuse	from Philadelphia via Kansas City (Note: No. 112: Philadelphia → Kansas City → New England. Multiple trades: Philadelphia → Kansas City (PD). See Round 2: Kansas City → Philadelphia. Kansas City → New England (D). Kansas City traded a fourth-round selection (112th overall) to New England in exchange for a 1996 third-round selection.)
4	113	Buffalo Bills	Justin Armour	WR	Stanford	from Arizona (Note: No. 113: Arizona → Buffalo (PD). Arizona traded a fourth-round selection (113th overall) to Buffalo in exchange for CB James Williams.)
4	114	Indianapolis Colts	Ray McElroy	S	Eastern Illinois	
4	115	St. Louis Rams	Lovell Pinkney	TE	Texas	from Detroit (Note: No. 115: Detroit → St. Louis (D). See Round 3: St. Louis → Detroit.)
4	116	Chicago Bears	Jack Jackson	WR	Florida	
4	117	Green Bay Packers	Jeff Miller	T	Ole Miss	from Green Bay via Miami (Note: No. 117: Green Bay → Miami → Green Bay. Multiple trades: Green Bay → Miami (PD). Green Bay traded a fourth-round selection (117th overall) to Miami in exchange for WR Mark Ingram Sr. Miami → Green Bay (PD). See Round 2: Green Bay → Miami.)
4	–	New York Giants	Selection forfeited during the 1994 supplemental draft. (Note: The NY Giants forfeited a fourth-round selection after selecting S Tito Wooten in the 1994 supplemental draft.)			
4	118	Los Angeles Raiders	Mike Morton	LB	North Carolina	
4	119	Philadelphia Eagles	Dave Barr	QB	California	from Kansas City via San Francisco and Cleveland (Note: No. 119: Kansas City → San Francisco → Cleveland → Philadelphia. Multiple trades: Kansas City → San Francisco (PD). Kansas City traded a fourth-round selection (119th overall) to San Francisco in exchange for QB Steve Bono. San Francisco → Cleveland (D). See Round 1: Cleveland → San Francisco. Cleveland → Philadelphia (D). Cleveland traded a fourth-round selection (119th overall) to Philadelphia in exchange for a fifth-round selection (147th overall) and a 1996 fifth-round selection.)
4	120	Pittsburgh Steelers	Oliver Gibson	DE	Notre Dame	from New England (Note: No. 120: New England → Pittsburgh (PD). New England traded a fourth-round selection (120th overall) to Pittsburgh in exchange for RB Leroy Thompson.)
4	121	Denver Broncos	Jamie Brown	T	Florida A&M	from Minnesota (Note: No. 121: Denver → Minnesota (D). See Round 4: Minnesota → Denver.)
4	122	Miami Dolphins	Pete Mitchell	TE	Boston College	
4	123	Jacksonville Jaguars	Mike Thompson	DT	Wisconsin	from Cleveland (Note: No. 123: Cleveland → Jacksonville (D). Cleveland traded a fourth-round selection (123rd overall) to Jacksonville in exchange for a fifth-round selection (136th overall) and a 1996 sixth-round selection.)
4	124	Denver Broncos	Ken Brown	LB	Virginia Tech	from Dallas via St. Louis (Note: No. 124: Dallas → St. Louis → Denver. Multiple trades: Dallas → St. Louis (PD). Dallas traded a fourth-round selection (124th overall) to St. Louis in exchange for a 1994 sixth-round selection. St. Louis → Denver (PD). St. Louis traded a fourth-round selection (124th overall) to Denver in exchange for QB Tommy Maddox.)
4	125	Pittsburgh Steelers	Donta Jones	LB	Nebraska	
4	126	Seattle Seahawks	Jason Kyle	LB	Arizona State	from San Diego (Note: No. 126: San Diego → Seattle (PD). San Diego traded a fourth-round selection (126th overall) to Seattle in exchange for a 1994 fifth-round selection.)
4	127	San Francisco 49ers	Tim Hanshaw	TE	BYU	
4*	128	New York Giants	Rob Zatechka	G	Nebraska	
4*	129	Dallas Cowboys	Alundis Brice	CB	Ole Miss	
4*	130	Dallas Cowboys	Linc Harden	LB	Oklahoma State	in place of NY Giants (time expired) (Note: No. 130: The NY Giants held the 130th pick, but did not make their selection in the allotted time. By rule, they could make a selection at any time afterwards, but Dallas, Buffalo and Carolina were able to make their own picks before the Giants could make their own.)
4*	131	Buffalo Bills	Tony Cline Jr.	TE	Stanford	in place of NY Giants (time expired) (Note: No. 131: See No. 130.)
4¤	132	Carolina Panthers	Frank Garcia	C	Washington	in place of NY Giants (time expired) (Note: No. 132: See No. 130.)
4*	133	New York Giants	Ben Talley	LB	Tennessee	instead of No. 130 (time expired) (Note: No. 133: See No. 130.)
4¤	134	Kansas City Chiefs	Steve Stenstrom	QB	Stanford	from Jacksonville (Note: No. 134: Jacksonville → Kansas City (D). See Round 1: Kansas City → Jacksonville.)
5	135	Carolina Panthers	Michael Senters	WR	Northwestern	
5	136	Cleveland Browns	Tau Pupua	DT	Weber State	from Jacksonville (Note: No. 123: Jacksonville → Cleveland (D). See Round 4: Cleveland → Jacksonville.)
5	137	Washington Redskins	Jamie Asher	TE	Louisville	from Houston (Note: No. 137: Houston → Washington (PD). Houston sent a fifth-round selection (137th overall) and a 1994 third-round selection to Washington as compensation for signing restricted free agent LB Wilber Marshall.)
5	138	Los Angeles Raiders	Matt Dyson	LB	Michigan	from Washington (Note: No. 138: Washington → Los Angeles (PD). Washington traded a fifth-round selection (138th overall) to Los Angeles in exchange for fifth- and seventh-round selections (152nd and 226th overall).)
5	139	Cincinnati Bengals	David Dunn	WR	Fresno State	
5	140	St. Louis Rams	Mike Scurlock	CB	Arizona	
5	141	Detroit Lions	Stephen Boyd ^{†}	LB	Boston College	from Seattle (Note: No. 141: Seattle → Detroit (PD). Seattle traded a fifth-round selection (141st overall) to Detroit in exchange for WR Reggie Barrett.)
5	142	New York Jets	Carl Greenwood	CB	UCLA	
5	143	Tampa Bay Buccaneers	Clifton Abraham	CB	Florida State	
5	144	Buffalo Bills	John Holecek	LB	Illinois	
5	145	Atlanta Falcons	Roell Preston ^{†}	WR	Ole Miss	
5	146	Denver Broncos	Phil Yeboah-Kodie	LB	Penn State	
5	147	Cleveland Browns	Mike Miller	WR	Notre Dame	from Philadelphia (Note: No. 147: Philadelphia → Cleveland (D). See Round 4: Cleveland → Philadelphia.)
5	148	New Orleans Saints	William Strong	DB	NC State	
5	149	Indianapolis Colts	Derek West	T	Colorado	
5	150	Arizona Cardinals	Cedric Davis	CB	Tennessee State	
5	151	Pittsburgh Steelers	Lethon Flowers	S	Georgia Tech	from Chicago (Note: No. 151: Chicago → Pittsburgh (PD). Chicago traded a fifth-round selection (151st overall) to Pittsburgh in exchange for WR Jeff Graham.)
5	152	Washington Redskins	Rich Owens	DE	Lehigh	from Green Bay via Los Angeles (Note: No. 152: Green Bay → Los Angeles → Washington. Multiple trades: Green Bay → Los Angeles (PD). Green Bay traded a fifth-round selection (152nd overall) to Los Angeles in exchange for WR Charles Jordan. Los Angeles → Washington (D). See Round 5: Washington → Los Angeles.)
5	153	New York Giants	Roderick Mullen	CB	Grambling	
5	154	Los Angeles Raiders	Jeff Kysar	T	Arizona State	
5	155	Kansas City Chiefs	Mike Pelton	DT	Auburn	
5	156	Detroit Lions	Kez McCorvey	WR	Florida State	
5	157	Minnesota Vikings	James Stewart	RB	Miami (FL)	
5	158	Miami Dolphins	Norman Hand	DT	Ole Miss	
5	159	Houston Oilers	Gary Walker ^{†}	DE	Auburn	from New England (Note: No. 159: New England → Houston (PD). New England sent a fifth-round selection (159th overall) to Houston as compensation for signing restricted free agent DL Tim Roberts.)
5	160	Green Bay Packers	Jay Barker	QB	Alabama	from Cleveland (Note: No. 160: Cleveland → Green Bay (D). See Round 3: Green Bay → Cleveland.)
5	161	Pittsburgh Steelers	Lance Brown	S	Indiana	
5	–	Dallas Cowboys	Selection forfeited during the 1994 supplemental draft. (Note: Dallas forfeited a fifth-round selection after selecting TE John Davis in the 1994 supplemental draft.)			
5	162	San Diego Chargers	'Omar Ellison	WR	Florida State	
5	163	Detroit Lions	Ronald Cherry	T	McNeese State	from San Francisco (Note: No. 163: San Francisco → Detroit (PD). San Francisco traded a fifth-round selection (163rd overall) to Detroit in exchange for RB Derrick Moore.)
5*	164	Kansas City Chiefs	Jerrott Willard	LB	California	
5*	165	Arizona Cardinals	Lance Scott	C	Utah	
5*	166	Dallas Cowboys	Ed Hervey	WR	USC	
5*	167	Arizona Cardinals	Tito Paul	CB	Ohio State	
5*	168	Dallas Cowboys	Dana Howard	LB	Illinois	
5*	169	Jacksonville Jaguars	Ryan Christopherson	RB	Wyoming	from Philadelphia (Note: No. 169: Philadelphia → Jacksonville (D). Philadelphia traded fifth- and seventh-round selections (169th and 219th overall) to Jacksonville in exchange for a sixth-round selection and two seventh-round selections (208th, 210th and 248th overall).)
5¤	170	Green Bay Packers	Travis Jervey ^{†}	RB	The Citadel	from Jacksonville (Note: No. 170: Jacksonville → Green Bay (PD). See Round 3: Jacksonville → Green Bay.)
5¤	171	Carolina Panthers	Andrew Peterson	T	Washington	
6	172	Jacksonville Jaguars	Marcus Price	T	LSU	
6	173	Green Bay Packers	Charlie Simmons	WR	Georgia Tech	from Carolina (Note: No. 173: Carolina → Green Bay (D). See Round 1: Green Bay → Carolina.)
6	174	Houston Oilers	Hicham El-Mashtoub	C	Arizona	
6	175	Cincinnati Bengals	Ryan Grigson	T	Purdue	
6	176	Washington Redskins	Brian Thure	T	California	
6	177	San Diego Chargers	Troy Sienkiewicz	G	New Mexico State	from St. Louis (Note: No. 177: St. Louis → San Diego (PD). St. Louis traded a sixth-round selection (177th overall) to San Diego in exchange for WR Nate Lewis.)
6	178	New York Jets	Eddie Mason	LB	North Carolina	
6	179	Tampa Bay Buccaneers	Wardell Rouse	LB	Clemson	
6	180	Seattle Seahawks	Henry McMillian	DT	Florida	
6	181	Atlanta Falcons	Travis Hall	DT	BYU	
6	182	Denver Broncos	Fritz Fequeire	G	Iowa	
6	183	San Diego Chargers	Brandon Harrison	WR	Howard Payne	from Philadelphia (Note: No. 183: Philadelphia → San Diego (PD). Philadelphia traded a sixth-round selection (183rd overall) to San Diego in exchange for DE Burt Grossman.)
6	184	New Orleans Saints	Lee DeRamus	WR	Wisconsin	
6	185	Buffalo Bills	Shannon Clavelle	DT	Colorado	
6	186	Detroit Lions	Kevin Hickman	TE	Navy	from Arizona
6	187	Indianapolis Colts	Brian Gelzheiser	LB	Penn State	
6	188	Carolina Panthers	Steve Strahan	DT	Baylor	from Carolina (Note: No. 188: Carolina → Green Bay (D). See Round 1: Green Bay → Carolina.)
6	189	Minnesota Vikings	John Solomon	LB	Sam Houston State	from NY Giants (Note: No. 189: NY Giants → Minnesota (PD). The NY Giants traded a sixth-round selection (189th overall) and a 1996 fifth-round selection to Minnesota in exchange for a 1996 sixth-round selection and S Vencie Glenn.)
6	190	Los Angeles Raiders	Eli Herring	T	BYU	
6	191	Carolina Panthers	Jerry Colquitt	QB	Tennessee	from Kansas City (Note: No. 191: Kansas City → Carolina (D). Kansas City traded a sixth-round selection (191st overall) to Carolina in exchange for a 1996 sixth-round selection.)
6	192	Detroit Lions	Cory Schlesinger ^{†}	FB	Nebraska	
6	193	Chicago Bears	Kenny Gales	CB	Wisconsin	
6	194	Miami Dolphins	Jeff Kopp	LB	USC	
6	195	New England Patriots	Dino Philyaw	RB	Oregon	
6	196	Denver Broncos	Terrell Davis^{‡}^{†}	RB	Georgia	from Minnesota (Note: No. 196: Denver → Minnesota (D). See Round 4: Minnesota → Denver.)
6	197	San Diego Chargers	Craig Whelihan	QB	Pacific	from Cleveland (Note: No. 197: Cleveland → San Diego (PD). Cleveland traded a sixth-round selection (197th overall) to San Diego in exchange for CB Donald Frank.)
6	198	Chicago Bears	Carl Reeves	DE	NC State	from Dallas (Note: No. 198: Dallas → Chicago (PD). Dallas traded a sixth-round selection (198th overall), LB Vinson Smith and LB Barry Minter to Chicago in exchange for TE Kelly Blackwell, LB John Roper and S Markus Paul.)
6	199	Pittsburgh Steelers	Barron Miles	CB	Nebraska	
6	200	San Diego Chargers	Tony Berti	T	Colorado	
6	201	San Francisco 49ers	Antonio Armstrong	DE	Texas A&M	
6*	202	Kansas City Chiefs	Bryan Proby	DT	Arizona State	
6*	203	Seattle Seahawks	Eddie Goines	WR	NC State	
6*	204	New York Giants	Jamal Duff	DE	San Diego State	
6*	205	Arizona Cardinals	Anthony Bridges	CB	North Texas	
6*	206	New York Giants	Charles Way	FB	Virginia	
6*	207	Kansas City Chiefs	Tom Barndt	C	Pittsburgh	
6¤	–	Carolina Panthers	Selection forfeited			
6¤	208	Philadelphia Eagles	Fred McCrary	FB	Mississippi State	from Jacksonville (Note: No. 208: Jacksonville → Philadelphia (D). See Round 5: Philadelphia → Jacksonville.)
7	209	Carolina Panthers	Chad Cota	S	Oregon	
7	210	Philadelphia Eagles	Kevin Bouie	RB	Mississippi State	from Jacksonville (Note: No. 210: Jacksonville → Philadelphia (D). See Round 5: Philadelphia → Jacksonville.)
7	211	Houston Oilers	C. J. Richardson	S	Miami (FL)	
7	212	Arizona Cardinals	Billy Williams	WR	Tennessee	from Washington.
7	213	Cincinnati Bengals	John Walsh	QB	BYU	
7	214	St. Louis Rams	Gerald McBurrows	S	Kansas	
7	215	Tampa Bay Buccaneers	Steve Ingram	G	Maryland	
7	216	Seattle Seahawks	Keif Bryant	DE	Rutgers	
7	217	New York Jets	Curtis Ceaser	WR	Grambling	
7	218	Denver Broncos	Steve Russ	LB	Air Force	
7	219	Jacksonville Jaguars	Curtis Marsh	WR	Utah	from Philadelphia (Note: No. 219: Philadelphia → Jacksonville (D). See Round 5: Philadelphia → Jacksonville.)
7	220	St. Louis Rams	Herman O'Berry	CB	Oregon	from New Orleans (Note: No. 220: New Orleans → St. Louis (PD). New Orleans traded a seventh-round selection (220th overall) to New Orleans in exchange for QB Jim Everett.)
7	221	Buffalo Bills	Tom Nütten	C	Western Michigan	
7	222	Denver Broncos	Byron Chamberlain ^{†}	WR	Wayne State (NE)	from Atlanta (Note: No. 222: Atlanta → Denver (PD). See Round 1: Denver → Atlanta.)
7	223	Indianapolis Colts	Jessie Cox	LB	Texas Southern	
7	224	Arizona Cardinals	Wesley Leasy	LB	Mississippi State	
7	225	New York Giants	Bryne Diehl	P	Alabama	
7	226	Washington Redskins	Scott Turner	CB	Illinois	from Los Angeles (Note: No. 226: Los Angeles → Washington (D). See Round 5: Washington → Los Angeles.)
7	227	Tampa Bay Buccaneers	Jeffrey Rodgers	DE	Texas A&M–Kingsville	from Kansas City (Note: No. 227: Kansas City → Tampa Bay (PD). Kansas City traded a seventh-round selection (227th overall) to Tampa Bay in exchange for CB Darren Anderson.)
7	228	Detroit Lions	Hessley Hempstead	G	Kansas	
7	229	Chicago Bears	Jamal Cox	LB	Georgia Tech	
7	230	Green Bay Packers	Adam Timmerman ^{†}	G	South Dakota State	
7	231	Cleveland Browns	A. C. Tellison	WR	Miami (FL)	from New England (Note: No. 231: New England → Cleveland (D). New England traded a seventh-round selection (231st) to Cleveland in exchange for a seventh-round selection (234th overall).)
7	232	Minnesota Vikings	Jose White	LB	Howard	
7	233	Miami Dolphins	Corey Swinson	DT	Hampton	
7	234	New England Patriots	Carlos Yancy	CB	Georgia	from Cleveland (Note: No. 234: Cleveland → New England (D). See Round 7: New England → Cleveland.)
7	235	Pittsburgh Steelers	Henry Bailey	WR	UNLV	
7	236	Dallas Cowboys	Oscar Sturgis	DE	North Carolina	
7	237	San Diego Chargers	Mark Montreuil	CB	Concordia (Quebec)	
7	238	San Francisco 49ers	Herb Coleman	DE	Trinity International (IL)	
7*	239	St. Louis Rams	Bronzell Miller	DE	Utah	
7*	240	St. Louis Rams	J. T. Thomas	WR	Arizona State	
7*	241	Arizona Cardinals	Chad Eaton	DT	Washington State	
7*	242	New Orleans Saints	Travis Davis	S	Notre Dame	
7*	243	Minnesota Vikings	Jason Fisk	DT	Stanford	
7*	244	Buffalo Bills	Darick Holmes	RB	Portland State	
7*	245	Atlanta Falcons	John Burrough	DE	Wyoming	
7*	246	Miami Dolphins	Shannon Myers	WR	Lenoir–Rhyne	
7*	247	Pittsburgh Steelers	Cole Ford	K	USC	
7¤	248	Philadelphia Eagles	Howard Smothers	T	Bethune–Cookman	from Jacksonville (Note: No. 248: Jacksonville → Philadelphia (D). See Round 5: Philadelphia → Jacksonville.)
7¤	249	Carolina Panthers	Michael Reed	CB	Boston College	

== Supplemental draft ==
Rnd.	Pick	Team	Player	Pos.	College	Notes
3	—	Dallas Cowboys	Darren Benson	DT	Trinity Valley	

== Trades ==
In the explanations below, (D) denotes trades that took place during the 1994 Draft, while (PD) indicates trades completed pre-draft.

Round 1

Round 2

Round 3

Round 4

Round 5

Round 6

Round 7

== Forfeited picks ==
Four selections in the 1995 draft were forfeited:

== Notable undrafted players ==
†	Pro Bowler (Note: Players are identified as a Pro Bowler if they were selected for the Pro Bowl at any time in their career.)

Original NFL team	Player	Pos.	College	Notes
Arizona Cardinals	Tommy Bennett	S	UCLA	
Arizona Cardinals	Kwamie Lassiter	S	Kansas	
Arizona Cardinals	Oscar McBride	TE	Notre Dame	
Atlanta Falcons	Tyrone Brown	WR	Toledo	
Carolina Panthers	Ken Walter	P	Kent State	
Chicago Bears	Fabien Bownes	WR	Western Illinois	
Chicago Bears	Marlon Forbes	CB	Penn State	
Cincinnati Bengals	Anthony Brown	T	Utah	
Cincinnati Bengals	Jason Burns	RB	Wisconsin	
Cincinnati Bengals	James Logan	LB	Memphis	
Cincinnati Bengals	Chris Shelling	CB	Auburn	
Cleveland Browns	Vashone Adams	S	Eastern Michigan	
Cleveland Browns	Brandon Bennett	RB	South Carolina	
Cleveland Browns	Earnest Hunter	RB	Southeastern Oklahoma State	
Cleveland Browns	Sale Isaia	G	UCLA	
Cleveland Browns	Randy Neal	LB	Virginia	
Dallas Cowboys	Jon Baker	K	Arizona State	
Dallas Cowboys	Billy Davis	WR	Pittsburgh	
Dallas Cowboys	Josh Evans	DT	UAB	
Dallas Cowboys	Oronde Gadsden	WR	Winston–Salem State	
Dallas Cowboys	Mike Gruttadauria	C	Central Florida	
Dallas Cowboys	Dominique Ross	RB	Valdosta State	
Dallas Cowboys	K.D. Williams	LB	Henderson State	
Denver Broncos	John Farquhar	TE	Duke	
Detroit Lions	Tommie Boyd	WR	Toledo	
Detroit Lions	Jeff Jones	T	Texas A&M	
Detroit Lions	Ron Rice	S	Eastern Michigan	
Detroit Lions	Josh Taves	DE	Northeastern	
Green Bay Packers	Matthew Dorsett	CB	Southern	
Green Bay Packers	Joe Nedney	K	San Jose State	
Houston Oilers	Dennis Lundy	RB	Northwestern	
Indianapolis Colts	Ben Bronson	WR	Baylor	
Indianapolis Colts	Clif Groce	RB	Texas A&M	
Indianapolis Colts	Steve Morrison	LB	Michigan	
Indianapolis Colts	Marcus Pollard	TE	Bradley	
Jacksonville Jaguars	Brett Bech	WR	LSU	
Kansas City Chiefs	Don Davis	LB	Kansas	
Miami Dolphins	Kirby Dar Dar	WR	Syracuse	
Miami Dolphins	Brent Moss	RB	Wisconsin	
Minnesota Vikings	Greg DeLong	TE	North Carolina	
New England Patriots	Andre President	TE	Angelo State	
New York Jets	Chad Cascadden	LB	Wisconsin	
New York Jets	Wayne Chrebet	WR	Hofstra	
New York Jets	Sherriden May	RB	Idaho	
Oakland Raiders	Johnnie Harris	S	Mississippi State	
Philadelphia Eagles	Uhuru Hamiter	DE	Delaware State	
Philadelphia Eagles	Tom Hutton	P	Tennessee	
Philadelphia Eagles	Freddie Solomon	WR	South Carolina State	
Philadelphia Eagles	Sylvester Wright	LB	Kansas	
San Diego Chargers	Ben Cavil	G	Oklahoma	
San Diego Chargers	Riddick Parker	DT	North Carolina	
San Francisco 49ers	Ryan Kuehl	LS	Virginia	
San Francisco 49ers	Willie Whitehead	DE	Auburn	
Seattle Seahawks	Mike Barber	LB	Clemson	
Seattle Seahawks	James McKeehan	TE	Texas A&M	
Seattle Seahawks	Donald Willis	G	North Carolina A&T	
Tampa Bay Buccaneers	Kelly Holcomb	QB	Middle Tennessee State	
Washington Redskins	Patrise Alexander	LB	Southwestern Louisiana	
Washington Redskins	Scott Blanton	K	Oklahoma	
Washington Redskins	Reggie Jones	WR	LSU	

== Hall of Famers ==
- Curtis Martin, running back from University of Pittsburgh, taken 3rd round, 74th overall by the New England Patriots.

Inducted: Professional Football Hall of Fame class of 2012.

- Warren Sapp, defensive tackle from University of Miami (FL), taken 1st round, 12th overall by the Tampa Bay Buccaneers.

Inducted: Professional Football Hall of Fame class of 2013.

- Derrick Brooks, linebacker from Florida State University, taken 1st round, 28th overall by the Tampa Bay Buccaneers.

Inducted: Professional Football Hall of Fame class of 2014.

- Terrell Davis, running back from University of Georgia, taken 6th round, 196th overall by the Denver Broncos.

Inducted: Professional Football Hall of Fame class of 2017.

- Ty Law, defensive back from University of Michigan, taken 1st round, 23rd overall by the New England Patriots.

Inducted: Professional Football Hall of Fame class of 2019.

- Tony Boselli, offensive tackle from University of Southern California, taken 1st round, 2nd overall by the Jacksonville Jaguars.

Inducted: Professional Football Hall of Fame class of 2022.
