= 1994 Washington State Cougars football team =

American college football season

1994 Washington State Cougars football
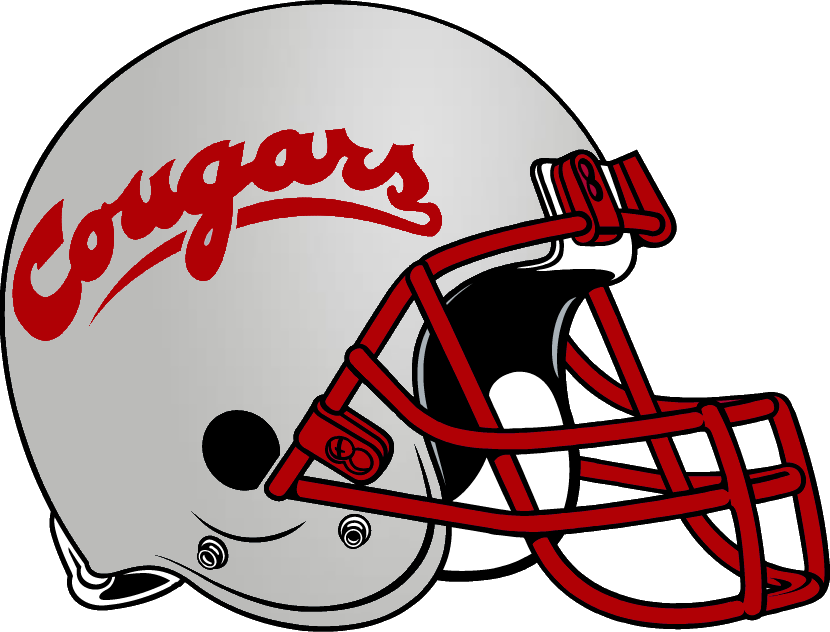

Alamo Bowl champion

Alamo Bowl, W 10–3 vs. Baylor
- Conference: Pacific-10 Conference

Ranking
- Coaches: No. 19
- AP: No. 21
- Record: 8–4 (5–3 Pac-10)
- Head coach: Mike Price (6th season)
- Offensive coordinator: Jim McDonell (1st season)
- Offensive scheme: Spread
- Defensive coordinator: Bill Doba (1st season)
- Base defense: 4–3
- Home stadium: Martin Stadium

1994 Pacific-10 Conference football standings
	Conf.					Overall
Team	W		L		T	W		L		T
No. 11 Oregon $	7	–	1	–	0	9	–	4	–	0
No. 13 USC	6	–	2	–	0	8	–	3	–	1
No. 20 Arizona	6	–	2	–	0	8	–	4	–	0
No. 21 Washington State	5	–	3	–	0	8	–	4	–	0
Washington	4	–	4	–	0	7	–	4	–	0
UCLA	3	–	5	–	0	5	–	6	–	0
California	3	–	5	–	0	4	–	7	–	0
Oregon State	2	–	6	–	0	4	–	7	–	0
Stanford	2	–	6	–	0	3	–	7	–	1
Arizona State	2	–	6	–	0	3	–	8	–	0
$ – Conference champion; Rankings from AP Poll

The 1994 Washington State Cougars football team was an American football team that represented Washington State University in the Pacific-10 Conference (Pac-10) during the 1994 NCAA Division I-A football season. In their sixth season under head coach Mike Price, the Cougars compiled an 7–4 regular season record (5–3 in Pac-10, fourth), and outscored their opponents 192 to 136. The preseason media poll had picked WSU to finish last in the conference.

The team's statistical leaders included Chad Davis with 2,299 passing yards, Frank Madu with 494 rushing yards, and Albert Kennedy with 551 receiving yards.

Home games were played on campus at Martin Stadium in Pullman. The Cougars hosted and won the Apple Cup, (their second straight victory over the Huskies on the Palouse), and went to the second Alamo Bowl; they defeated Baylor for their eighth win, and were 21st in the final AP poll.

== Schedule ==
Date	Time	Opponent	Rank	Site	TV	Result	Attendance
September 1	5:30 pm	vs. No. 21 Illinois*		Soldier Field; Chicago, IL		W 10–9	39,472
September 10	2:00 pm	Fresno State*		Martin Stadium; Pullman, WA		W 24–3	24,107
September 24	3:30 pm	at No. 18 UCLA	No. 22	Rose Bowl; Pasadena, CA	PSN	W 21–0	42,877
October 1	1:00 pm	at Tennessee*	No. 17	Neyland Stadium; Knoxville, TN		L 9–10	95,556
October 8	2:00 pm	Oregon	No. 22	Martin Stadium; Pullman, WA		W 21–7	37,600
October 15	3:30 pm	No. 14 Arizona^{†}	No. 20	Martin Stadium; Pullman, WA	PSN	L 7–10	37,600
October 22	7:00 pm	at Arizona State	No. 23	Sun Devil Stadium; Tempe, AZ	PSN	W 28–21	46,494
October 29	3:30 pm	at California	No. 22	California Memorial Stadium; Berkeley, CA		W 26–23	34,000
November 5	12:30 pm	No. 22 USC	No. 16	Martin Stadium; Pullman, WA	ABC	L 10–23	36,686
November 12	1:00 pm	at Oregon State	No. 24	Parker Stadium; Corvallis, OR		L 3–21	26,438
November 19	3:30 pm	No. 18 Washington		Martin Stadium; Pullman, WA (Apple Cup)	PSN	W 23–6	30,395
December 31	5:00 pm	vs. Baylor*	No. 24	Alamodome; San Antonio, TX (Alamo Bowl)	ESPN	W 10–3	44,106
*Non-conference game; ^{†}Homecoming; Rankings from AP Poll released prior to the game; All times are in Pacific time

== Game summaries ==
=== Washington ===
Team	1	2	3	4	Total
Washington	6	0	0	0	6
• Washington State	7	14	2	0	23

- Date: November 19
- Location: Martin Stadium, Pullman, Washington
- Game start: 3:30 pm PST
- Game attendance: 30,395
- Television network: Prime Sports Northwest

Scoring summary
1	WASH	Neal 7-yard run (kick failed)	WASH 6-0
1	WSU	Sparks 1-yard run (Trout kick)	WSU 7-6
2	WSU	Hicks 3-yard run (Trout kick)	WSU 14-6
2	WSU	Sparks 1-yard run (Trout kick)	WSU 21-6
3	WSU	Safety, ball snapped out of end zone	WSU 23-6

=== Alamo Bowl ===
Team	1	2	3	4	Total
Baylor	0	0	3	0	3
• Washington State	7	3	0	0	10

- Date: December 31
- Location: Alamodome, San Antonio, Texas
- Game start: 7:00 pm CST
- Game attendance: 44,106
- Game weather: Indoors
- Television network: ESPN

== Roster ==
1994 Washington State Cougars football team roster
Players
Coaches
Offense

Pos.	#	Name	Class
WR	17	Chad Carpenter	So
QB	16	Derek Chapman
QB	12	Chad Davis	So
QB	15	Shawn Deeds	Jr
QB	2	Chad DeGrenier	Sr
WR	1	Jay Dumas	Jr
RB	23	Kevin Hicks	Sr
WR	85	Albert Kennedy	Sr
TE	98	David Knuff	So
G	75	Ron Lewis	Sr
RB	4	Frank Madu	Jr
C	68	Marc McCloskey	Jr
TE	89	Eric Moore	Jr
G	50	Paul Reed	Sr
OT	70	Clay Reis	Sr
OT	72	Scott Sanderson	So
G	79	John Scukanec	Jr
RB	5	Derek Sparks	Jr

Defense

Pos.	#	Name	Class
CB	27	Greg Burns (injured)	Sr
LB	31	Ron Childs	Sr
DT	90	Chad Eaton	Sr
LB	29	Mark Fields	Sr
LB	22	Chris Hayes	Jr
CB	24	Torey Hunter	Sr
CB	2	Ray Jackson	So
SS	8	Singor Mobley	Sr
LB		Johnny Nansen	So
DE	86	DeWayne Patterson	Sr
DB	10	John Rushing	Sr
DE	92	Dwayne Sanders	Jr
DE	94	Don Sasa	Sr
CB	6	Brian Walker	Jr

Special teams

Pos.	#	Name	Class
P	26	George Martin	Jr
K	47	Tony Truant	So

Head coach

- Mike Price (6th year)

Coordinators/assistant coaches

- John McDonell – OC
- Bill Doba – DC

Legend

- (C) Team captain
- (S) Suspended
- (I) Ineligible
- Injured
- Redshirt

== NFL draft ==
Four Cougars were selected in the 1995 NFL draft.

Player	Position	Round	Overall	Franchise
Mark Fields	LB	1	13	New Orleans Saints
Don Sasa	DT	3	93	San Diego Chargers
Torey Hunter	DB	3	95	Houston Oilers
Chad Eaton	DL	7	241	Arizona Cardinals
