= 1994 USC Trojans football team =

American college football season

1994 USC Trojans football

Cotton Bowl Classic champion

Cotton Bowl Classic, W 55–14 vs. Texas Tech
- Conference: Pacific-10 Conference

Ranking
- Coaches: No. 15
- AP: No. 13
- Record: 8–3–1 (6–2 Pac-10)
- Head coach: John Robinson (9th season)
- Offensive coordinator: Mike Riley (2nd season)
- Defensive coordinator: Keith Burns (1st season)
- Captains: Tony Boselli; Jeff Kopp; Brian Williams
- Home stadium: Los Angeles Memorial Coliseum

1994 Pacific-10 Conference football standings
	Conf.					Overall
Team	W		L		T	W		L		T
No. 11 Oregon $	7	–	1	–	0	9	–	4	–	0
No. 13 USC	6	–	2	–	0	8	–	3	–	1
No. 20 Arizona	6	–	2	–	0	8	–	4	–	0
No. 21 Washington State	5	–	3	–	0	8	–	4	–	0
Washington	4	–	4	–	0	7	–	4	–	0
UCLA	3	–	5	–	0	5	–	6	–	0
California	3	–	5	–	0	4	–	7	–	0
Oregon State	2	–	6	–	0	4	–	7	–	0
Stanford	2	–	6	–	0	3	–	7	–	1
Arizona State	2	–	6	–	0	3	–	8	–	0
$ – Conference champion; Rankings from AP Poll

The 1994 USC Trojans football team represented the University of Southern California (USC) in the 1994 NCAA Division I-A football season. In their ninth year under head coach John Robinson, the Trojans compiled an 8–3–1 record (6–2 against conference opponents), finished in second place in the Pacific-10 Conference (Pac-10), and outscored their opponents by a combined total of 356 to 243.

Quarterback Rob Johnson led the team in passing, completing 186 of 276 passes for 2,499 yards with 15 touchdowns and six interceptions. Shawn Walters led the team in rushing with 193 carries for 976 yards and 11 touchdowns. Keyshawn Johnson led the team in receiving with 66 catches for 1,362 yards and nine touchdowns.

== Schedule ==
Date	Time	Opponent	Rank	Site	TV	Result	Attendance
September 3	12:30 p.m.	No. 23 Washington	No. 13	Los Angeles Memorial Coliseum; Los Angeles, CA	ABC	W 24–17	54,538
September 10	12:30 p.m.	at No. 8 Penn State*	No. 14	Beaver Stadium; University Park, PA	ABC	L 14–38	96,463
September 24	7:00 p.m.	Baylor*	No. 19	Los Angeles Memorial Coliseum; Los Angeles, CA	Prime	W 37–27	45,762
October 1	3:30 p.m.	Oregon	No. 19	Los Angeles Memorial Coliseum; Los Angeles, CA	Prime	L 7–22	44,232
October 8	3:30 p.m.	at Oregon State		Parker Stadium; Corvallis, OR	Prime	W 27–19	33,892
October 15	4:00 p.m.	at Stanford		Stanford Stadium; Stanford, CA (rivalry)	ABC	W 27–20	60,345
October 22	3:30 p.m.	California^{†}		Los Angeles Memorial Coliseum; Los Angeles, CA	Prime	W 61–0	55,213
November 5	12:30 p.m.	at No. 16 Washington State	No. 22	Martin Stadium; Pullman, WA	ABC	W 23–10	36,686
November 12	12:30 p.m.	No. 13 Arizona	No. 17	Los Angeles Memorial Coliseum; Los Angeles, CA	ABC	W 45–28	61,264
November 19	12:30 p.m.	at UCLA	No. 13	Rose Bowl; Pasadena, CA (Victory Bell)	ABC	L 19–31	91,815
November 26	5:00 p.m.	Notre Dame*	No. 17	Los Angeles Memorial Coliseum; Los Angeles, CA (Jeweled Shillelagh)	ABC	T 17–17	90,217
January 2, 1995	10:00 a.m.	vs. Texas Tech*	No. 21	Cotton Bowl; Dallas, TX (Cotton Bowl Classic)	NBC	W 55–14	70,218
*Non-conference game; ^{†}Homecoming; Rankings from AP Poll released prior to the game; All times are in Pacific time

== Roster ==
1994 USC Trojans football team roster
Players
Coaches
Offense

Pos.	#	Name	Class
TE	84	John Allred	So
G	67	Chris Brymer	Fr
OT	71	Tony Boselli	Sr
OT	76	Norberto Garrido	Jr
WR	88	Ed Hervey	Sr
WR	3	Keyshawn Johnson	Fr
QB	11	Rob Johnson	Sr
TE	81	Johnny McWilliams	Jr
QB	7	Kyle Wachholtz	Jr

Defense

Pos.	#	Name	Class
S	9	Sammy Knight	So
LB	35	Jeff Kopp	Sr
DT	96	Darrell Russell	Fr
LB	5	Brian Williams	Sr

Special teams

Pos.	#	Name	Class
K	14	Cole Ford	Sr

Head coach

- John Robinson

Coordinators/assistant coaches

- Keith Burns (defensive coordinator)

Legend

- (C) Team captain
- (S) Suspended
- (I) Ineligible
- Injured
- Redshirt

== Season summary ==
=== Washington ===
Washington at USC

Team	1	2	3	4	Total
No. 23 Huskies	7	7	3	0	17
• No. 13 Trojans	7	3	7	7	24

- Date: September 3
- Location: Los Angeles Memorial Coliseum
- Game attendance: 54,538

Scoring summary
Q1	WASH	Bjornson 52 yard pass from Huard (Wales kick)	WASH 7–0
Q1	USC	McWilliams 6 yard pass from Johnson (Ford kick)	Tie 7–7
Q2	USC	Ford 32 yard field goal	USC 10–7
Q2	WASH	Kaufman 1 yard run (Wales kick)	WASH 14–10
Q3	WASH	Wales 29 yard field goal	WASH 17–10
Q4	USC	Walters 7 yard run (Ford kick)	Tie 17–17
Q4	USC	Walters 3 yard run (Ford kick)	USC 24–17

=== Baylor ===
- Shawn Walters 31 rushes, 207 yards

=== Stanford ===
- Shawn Walters 31 rushes, 234 yards

=== Cotton Bowl Classic ===
USC vs. Texas Tech

Team	1	2	3	4	Total
• No. 21 Trojans	28	6	14	7	55
Red Raiders	0	0	7	7	14

- Date: January 2
- Location: Cotton Bowl
- Game attendance: 70,218
- Television network: NBC

Scoring summary
Q1	6:51	USC	Shawn Walters 11-yard touchdown run (Ford kick)	USC 7–0
Q1	6:39	USC	Terry Barnum 19-yard touchdown pass from Rob Johnson (Ford kick)	USC 14–0
Q1	5:35	USC	John Herpin 26-yard interception return (Ford kick)	USC 21–0
Q1	2:22	USC	Keyshawn Johnson 12-yard touchdown pass from R. Johnson (Ford kick)	USC 28–0
Q2	6:50	USC	Ford 39-yard field goal	USC 31–0
Q2	0:17	USC	Ford 42-yard field goal	USC 34–0
Q3	10:29	USC	Keyshawn Johnson 22-yard touchdown pass from R. Johnson (Ford kick)	USC 41–0
Q3	7:51	USC	Keyshawn Johnson 86-yard touchdown pass from Brad Otton (Ford kick)	USC 48–0
Q3	2:15	TTU	Zebbie Lethridge 5-yard touchdown run (Davis kick)	USC 48–7
Q4	2:40	USC	Jeff Diltz 2-yard touchdown pass from Brad Otton (Ford kick)	USC 55–7
Q4	0:00	TTU	Stacy Mitchell 45-yard touchdown pass from Sone Cavazos (Davis kick)	USC 55–14
