= 1994 Washington Huskies football team =

American college football season

1994 Washington Huskies football
- Conference: Pacific-10 Conference
- Record: 7–4 (4–4 Pac-10)
- Head coach: Jim Lambright (2nd season)
- Offensive coordinator: Bill Diedrick (1st season)
- Defensive coordinator: Chris Tormey (1st season)
- MVP: Napoleon Kaufman
- Captains: David Killpatrick; Donovan Schmidt; Mark Bruener; Napoleon Kaufman
- Home stadium: Husky Stadium

1994 Pacific-10 Conference football standings
	Conf.					Overall
Team	W		L		T	W		L		T
No. 11 Oregon $	7	–	1	–	0	9	–	4	–	0
No. 13 USC	6	–	2	–	0	8	–	3	–	1
No. 20 Arizona	6	–	2	–	0	8	–	4	–	0
No. 21 Washington State	5	–	3	–	0	8	–	4	–	0
Washington	4	–	4	–	0	7	–	4	–	0
UCLA	3	–	5	–	0	5	–	6	–	0
California	3	–	5	–	0	4	–	7	–	0
Oregon State	2	–	6	–	0	4	–	7	–	0
Stanford	2	–	6	–	0	3	–	7	–	1
Arizona State	2	–	6	–	0	3	–	8	–	0
$ – Conference champion; Rankings from AP Poll

The 1994 Washington Huskies football team was an American football team that represented the University of Washington during the 1994 NCAA Division I-A football season. In its second season under head coach Jim Lambright, the team compiled a 7–4 record, finished in fourth place in the Pacific-10 Conference, and outscored its opponents by a combined total of 295 to 233.

In the third game, the Huskies upset Miami at the Miami Orange Bowl, breaking the Hurricanes' home winning streak at 58 games. Midway through the season, Washington was 5–1 and ranked ninth, but lost three of the final five games. All four losses were on the road to Pac-10 opponents. Due to earlier sanctions, the Huskies were ineligible for a bowl as they were serving the second year of a two year bowl ban.

For the second consecutive year, Napoleon Kaufman was selected as the team's most valuable player. Kaufman, Mark Bruener, David Killpatrick, and Donovan Schmidt were the team captains.

== Schedule ==
Date	Time	Opponent	Rank	Site	TV	Result	Attendance
September 3	12:30 p.m.	at No. 17 USC	No. 23	Los Angeles Memorial Coliseum; Los Angeles, CA	ABC	L 17–24	54,538
September 10	12:30 p.m.	No. 18 Ohio State*	No. 25	Husky Stadium; Seattle, WA	ABC	W 25–16	70,861
September 24	12:30 p.m.	at No. 5 Miami (FL)*	No. 19	Miami Orange Bowl; Miami, FL	ABC	W 38–20	62,663
October 1	12:30 p.m.	UCLA	No. 12	Husky Stadium; Seattle, WA	ABC	W 37–10	71,851
October 8	12:30 p.m.	San Jose State*	No. 12	Husky Stadium; Seattle, WA		W 34–20	69,448
October 15	12:30 p.m.	Arizona State	No. 9	Husky Stadium; Seattle, WA		W 35–14	69,335
October 22	12:30 p.m.	at Oregon	No. 9	Autzen Stadium; Eugene, OR (rivalry)	ABC	L 20–31	44,134
October 29	12:30 p.m.	Oregon State	No. 15	Husky Stadium; Seattle, WA		W 24–10	70,071
November 5	3:30 p.m.	at Stanford	No. 12	Stanford Stadium; Stanford, CA	Prime	L 28–46	44,200
November 12	12:30 p.m.	California	No. 22	Husky Stadium; Seattle, WA		W 31–19	69,618
November 19	3:30 p.m.	at Washington State	No. 18	Martin Stadium; Pullman, WA (Apple Cup)	Prime	L 6–23	30,395
*Non-conference game; Rankings from AP Poll released prior to the game; All times are in Pacific time

== Game summaries ==
=== At USC ===
Washington at USC

Team	1	2	3	4	Total
No. 23 Huskies	7	7	3	0	17
• No. 13 Trojans	7	3	7	7	24

- Date: September 3
- Location: Los Angeles Memorial Coliseum
- Game attendance: 54,538

Scoring summary
Q1	WASH	Bjornson 52 yard pass from Huard (Wales kick)	WASH 7–0
Q1	USC	McWilliams 6 yard pass from Johnson (Ford kick)	Tie 7–7
Q2	USC	Ford 32 yard field goal	USC 10–7
Q2	WASH	Kaufman 1 yard run (Wales kick)	WASH 14–10
Q3	WASH	Wales 29 yard field goal	WASH 17–10
Q4	USC	Walters 7 yard run (Ford kick)	Tie 17–17
Q4	USC	Walters 3 yard run (Ford kick)	USC 24–17

=== At Miami (FL) ===
Washington at Miami (FL)

Team	1	2	3	4	Total
• No. 19 Huskies	0	3	25	10	38
No. 5 Hurricanes	3	11	3	3	20

- Date: September 24
- Location: Orange Bowl, Miami, FL
- Game attendance: 62,663
- TV announcers (ABC): Brent Musburger, Dick Vermeil, and Jack Arute

Washington's win in the Miami Orange Bowl snapped a 58-game home winning streak for the Hurricanes.

=== At Oregon ===
Washington at Oregon

Team	1	2	3	4	Total
No. 9 Huskies	0	13	0	7	20
• Ducks	0	14	3	14	31

- Date: October 22
- Location: Autzen Stadium
- Game attendance: 44,134
- Game weather: Sunny

Scoring summary
Q2	WASH	Wales 38 yard field goal	WASH 3–0
Q2	ORE	Philylaw 8 yard run (Belden kick)	ORE 7–3
Q2	ORE	Whittle 5 yard run (Belden kick)	ORE 14–3
Q2	WASH	Bjornson 51 yard pass from Huard (Wales kick)	ORE 14–10
Q2	WASH	Wales 29 yard field goal	ORE 14–13
Q3	ORE	Belden 45 yard field goal	ORE 17–13
Q4	WASH	Thomas 10 yard run (Wales kick)	WASH 20–17
Q4	ORE	Jones 12 yard run (Belden kick)	ORE 24–20
Q4	ORE	Wheaton 97 yard interception return (Belden kick)	ORE 31–20

=== At Washington State ===
Team	1	2	3	4	Total
No. 18 Huskies	6	0	0	0	6
• Cougars	7	14	2	0	23

- Date: November 19
- Location: Martin Stadium, Pullman, Washington
- Game attendance: 37,600

Scoring summary
1	WASH	Neal 7-yard run (kick failed)	WASH 6-0
1	WSU	Sparks 1-yard run (Trout kick)	WSU 7-6
2	WSU	Hicks 3-yard run (Trout kick)	WSU 14-6
2	WSU	Sparks 1-yard run (Trout kick)	WSU 21-6
3	WSU	Safety, ball snapped out of end zone	WSU 23-6

== Roster ==
1994 Washington Huskies football team roster
Players
Coaches
Offense

Pos.	#	Name	Class
OT	70	Eric Battle	Jr
SE	14	Eric Bjornson	Sr
TE	85	Mark Bruener	Sr
TE	82	Ernie Conwell	Jr
C	65	Frank Garcia	Sr
G	79	Trevor Highfield	Jr
QB	7	Damon Huard	Jr
SE	19	Dave Janoski	So
RB	8	Napoleon Kaufman	Sr
G	54	Patrick Kesi	Jr
RB	12	Leon Neal	Jr
G	60	Andrew Peterson	Sr
OT	72	Bob Sapp	So
FB	30	Richard Thomas	Jr
WR	94	John Tubbs II	Fr

Defense

Pos.	#	Name	Class
LB	54	Ink Aleaga	So
LB	32	Richie Chambers	Sr
DE	43	Deke Devers	Jr
DT	88	Mike Ewaliko	Jr
LB	57	John Fiala	So
CB	26	Russell Hairston	Sr
NT	91	Steve Hoffmann	Jr
LB	35	David Killpatrick	Sr
ROV	25	Lamar Lyons	Sr
FS	9	Lawyer Milloy	So
CB	4	Reggie Reser	Jr
DT	97	David Richie	So
LB	52	Donovan Schmidt	Sr

Special teams

Pos.	#	Name	Class
P	14	Geoff Prince	So
PK	18	John Wales	So

Head coach

- Jim Lambright (2nd year)

Coordinators/assistant coaches

- Bill Diedrick (OC, QB)
- Chris Tormey (DC, S)
- Dick Baird (LB)
- Randy Hart (DL)
- Al Lavan (RB)
- Scott Linehan (WR)
- Rick Mallory (TE)
- Ron Milus (CB)
- Steve Morton (OL)

Legend

- (C) Team captain
- (S) Suspended
- (I) Ineligible
- Injured
- Redshirt

== NFL draft selections ==
The following Washington players were selected in the 1995 NFL draft:

Player	Position	Round	Pick	NFL club
Napoleon Kaufman	RB	1	17	Oakland Raiders
Mark Bruener	TE	1	27	Pittsburgh Steelers
Eric Bjornson	WR	4	110	Dallas Cowboys
Frank Garcia	C	4	132	Carolina Panthers
Andrew Peterson	OT	5	171	Carolina Panthers

- This draft was seven rounds, with 249 selections
