= John Rushing =

American football player and coach (born 1972–2020)

Profile
- Position: Safeties coach

Personal information
- Born: February 26, 1972; Merced, California, U.S.
- Died: October 23, 2020 (aged 48); Arizona, U.S.

Career information
- High school: Merced (CA)
- College: Washington State
- NFL draft: 1995: undrafted

Career history

Playing
- Birmingham Barracudas (1995)*; Dallas Cowboys (1996)*; Edmonton Eskimos (1997)*
- * Offseason or practice squad member only

Coaching
- Merced Union HS (1995) Secondary coach; Willamette (1996–1997) Secondary coach; Boise State (1998–1999) Graduate assistant / secondary; Montana State (2000–2002) Secondary coach; Utah State (2003–2004) Secondary coach; Utah State (2005–2008) Cornerbacks coach; Green Bay Packers (2009–2010) Offensive quality control; Green Bay Packers (2011) Assistant wide receivers / special teams; Green Bay Packers (2012–2013) Offensive assistant / special teams; Green Bay Packers (2014–2016) Defensive quality control; Los Angeles Rams (2016) Special teams & Defensive consultant; Oregon State (2017) Safeties coach; Arizona (2018–2019) Safeties coach

Awards and highlights
- Super Bowl champion (XLV)

John Rushing (February 26, 1972 – October 23, 2020) was an American college and professional football assistant coach who previously served as the safeties coach at the University of Arizona. Rushing served for six years as a defensive coach at Utah State University and was the secondary coach for three other college programs.

Born and raised in Merced, California, Rushing played college football at Washington State University in Pullman under head coach Mike Price, and was a four-year starter as a defensive back for the Cougars.

His brother is Hamilton Tiger-Cats wide receiver Kevin Robinson.

Rushing died on October 23, 2020, at the age of 48.
