= 1994 Oregon State Beavers football team =

American college football season

1994 Oregon State Beavers football
- Conference: Pacific-10 Conference
- Record: 4–7 (2–6 Pac-10)
- Head coach: Jerry Pettibone (4th season)
- Offensive coordinator: Mike Summers (4th season)
- Offensive scheme: Multiple
- Defensive coordinator: Rocky Long (4th season)
- Base defense: 3–3–5
- Home stadium: Parker Stadium

1994 Pacific-10 Conference football standings
	Conf.					Overall
Team	W		L		T	W		L		T
No. 11 Oregon $	7	–	1	–	0	9	–	4	–	0
No. 13 USC	6	–	2	–	0	8	–	3	–	1
No. 20 Arizona	6	–	2	–	0	8	–	4	–	0
No. 21 Washington State	5	–	3	–	0	8	–	4	–	0
Washington	4	–	4	–	0	7	–	4	–	0
UCLA	3	–	5	–	0	5	–	6	–	0
California	3	–	5	–	0	4	–	7	–	0
Oregon State	2	–	6	–	0	4	–	7	–	0
Stanford	2	–	6	–	0	3	–	7	–	1
Arizona State	2	–	6	–	0	3	–	8	–	0
$ – Conference champion; Rankings from AP Poll

The 1994 Oregon State Beavers football team represented Oregon State University in the Pacific-10 Conference (Pac-10) during the 1994 NCAA Division I-A football season. In their fourth season under head coach Jerry Pettibone, the Beavers compiled a 4–7 record (2–6 against Pac-10 opponents), finished in a tie for last place in the Pac-10, and were outscored by their opponents, 239 to 223. The team played its home games at Parker Stadium in Corvallis, Oregon.

== Schedule ==
Date	Opponent	Site	Result	Attendance
September 3	at Arizona State	Sun Devil Stadium; Tempe, AZ	L 16–22	44,628
September 10	Wyoming*	Parker Stadium; Corvallis, OR	W 44–31	28,037
September 17	at Fresno State*	Bulldog Stadium; Fresno, CA	L 14–24	36,379
October 1	at No. 6 Arizona	Arizona Stadium; Tucson, AZ	L 10–30	54,245
October 8	USC	Parker Stadium; Corvallis, OR	L 19–27	33,892
October 15	at UCLA	Rose Bowl; Pasadena, CA	W 23–14	35,347
October 22	Stanford	Parker Stadium; Corvallis, OR	L 29–35	33,259
October 29	at No. 15 Washington	Husky Stadium; Seattle, WA	L 10–24	70,071
November 5	Pacific (CA)*	Parker Stadium; Corvallis, OR	W 24–12	24,282
November 12	No. 24 Washington State	Parker Stadium; Corvallis, OR	W 21–3	26,438
November 19	No. 12 Oregon	Parker Stadium; Corvallis, OR (Civil War)	L 13–17	37,010
*Non-conference game; Rankings from AP Poll released prior to the game

== Roster ==
- QB Don Shanklin
