= 1994 Arizona Wildcats football team =

American college football season

1994 Arizona Wildcats football

Freedom Bowl, L 13–16 vs. Utah
- Conference: Pacific-10 Conference

Ranking
- Coaches: No. 20
- AP: No. 20
- Record: 8–4 (6–2 Pac-10)
- Head coach: Dick Tomey (8th season)
- Offensive coordinator: Duane Akina (3rd season)
- Offensive scheme: Multiple
- Defensive coordinator: Larry Mac Duff (8th season)
- Base defense: Double Eagle Flex
- Home stadium: Arizona Stadium

1994 Pacific-10 Conference football standings
	Conf.					Overall
Team	W		L		T	W		L		T
No. 11 Oregon $	7	–	1	–	0	9	–	4	–	0
No. 13 USC	6	–	2	–	0	8	–	3	–	1
No. 20 Arizona	6	–	2	–	0	8	–	4	–	0
No. 21 Washington State	5	–	3	–	0	8	–	4	–	0
Washington	4	–	4	–	0	7	–	4	–	0
UCLA	3	–	5	–	0	5	–	6	–	0
California	3	–	5	–	0	4	–	7	–	0
Oregon State	2	–	6	–	0	4	–	7	–	0
Stanford	2	–	6	–	0	3	–	7	–	1
Arizona State	2	–	6	–	0	3	–	8	–	0
$ – Conference champion; Rankings from AP Poll

The 1994 Arizona Wildcats football team represented University of Arizona as a member of the Pacific-10 Conference (Pac-10) during the 1994 NCAA Division I-A football season. The offense scored 274 points while the defense allowed 190 points. Under head coach Dick Tomey in his eighth season, the Wildcats completed the season with a record of 8–4 (6–2 against Pac-10 opponents) and lost to Utah in the Freedom Bowl.

With most of their “Desert Swarm” defense returning, Arizona attempted to improve on their successful 1993 season and entered 1994 as contenders for the Rose Bowl. However, those expectations would fall short late in the season, and the Wildcats still managed to earn a winning record and bowl appearance.

Led by the Desert Swarm, the Wildcats finished second behind Virginia in rushing defense, tenth in total defense, and eleventh in scoring defense.

== Schedule ==
Date	Time	Opponent	Rank	Site	TV	Result	Attendance	Source
September 1	5:00 p.m.	at Georgia Tech*	No. 7	Bobby Dodd Stadium; Atlanta, GA	ESPN	W 19–14	45,112	
September 10	7:00 p.m.	New Mexico State*	No. 9	Arizona Stadium; Tucson, AZ	KTTU	W 44–0	52,889	
September 24	12:30 p.m.	at Stanford	No. 8	Stanford Stadium; Stanford, CA	ABC	W 34–10	42,593	
October 1	7:00 p.m.	Oregon State	No. 6	Arizona Stadium; Tucson, AZ	Prime	W 30–10	54,245	
October 8	7:00 p.m.	No. 23 Colorado State*	No. 6	Arizona Stadium; Tucson, AZ	Prime	L 16–21	56,534	
October 15	3:30 p.m.	at No. 20 Washington State	No. 14	Martin Stadium; Pullman, WA	Prime	W 10–7	37,600	
October 22	12:30 p.m.	UCLA	No. 14	Arizona Stadium; Tucson, AZ	ABC	W 34–24	58,817	
October 29	12:30 p.m.	at Oregon	No. 11	Autzen Stadium; Eugene, OR	ABC	L 9–10	36,760	
November 5	4:00 p.m.	California^{†}	No. 18	Arizona Stadium; Tucson, AZ	Prime	W 13–6	58,374	
November 12	1:30 p.m.	at No. 17 USC	No. 13	Los Angeles Memorial Coliseum; Los Angeles, CA	ABC	L 28–45	61,264	
November 25	4:00 p.m.	Arizona State	No. 16	Arizona Stadium; Tucson, AZ (rivalry)	ABC	W 28–27	58,810	
December 27	7:00 p.m.	vs. No. 14 Utah*	No. 15	Anaheim Stadium; Anaheim, CA (Freedom Bowl)	Raycom, KTTU	L 13–16	27,477	
*Non-conference game; ^{†}Homecoming; Rankings from AP Poll released prior to the game; All times are in Mountain time

== Before the season ==
The Wildcats concluded the 1993 season with a 10–2 record by sharing the Pac-10 title and winning the Fiesta Bowl. It was their first ten-win season in school history. The team was led by their dominant defense, the Desert Swarm, and led the nation in rushing defensive categories. They also lost out on the Rose Bowl due to a head-to-head loss to UCLA and a second-half collapse at California. Despite the losses, Arizona bounced back and got the Fiesta Bowl bid and shut out Miami, and entered 1994 with hopes of achieving their chances at a potential Rose Bowl spot.

Although the Arizona basketball team’s Final Four run in the spring overshadowed the football team’s success, the Wildcats spent the offseason preparing for the 1994 season and was not only contending for the Rose Bowl, but for a possible national championship. In the preseason poll, the Wildcats earned a ranking of seventh. The team was also featured on the front cover of Sports Illustrated in August and was ranked first in the magazine’s poll.

== Game summaries ==
=== Georgia Tech ===
Arizona kicked off the season with a Thursday night matchup with Georgia Tech. The Wildcats started slow but recovered to take a 10-7 at the break. In the second half, Georgia Tech rallied to regain the lead. Late in the fourth quarter, Arizona drove down the field and scored in the final minute to get the win and avoid a major upset. Tomey said after the game that despite being the season opener, that the victory saved the Wildcats’ season due to them being Rose Bowl contenders, whereas a loss would have likely hurt their chances.

=== New Mexico State ===
In their home opener, the Wildcats hosted New Mexico State. The Desert Swarm would dominate the Aggies and Arizona’s offense put up scores to win big. As they did in 1992, Arizona had another shutout and was their third consecutive shutout victory over the Aggies since 1954 (New Mexico State has not scored against Arizona since 1953). The Wildcats’ offense improved from their last game, scoring 44 points against a poor New Mexico State defense and it turned out to be Arizona’s highest number of points scored in a game this season.

=== Colorado State ===
Arizona, ranked sixth, hosted Colorado State in another non-conference contest. The Rams would score three touchdowns against the Wildcats’ Desert Swarm. Arizona, however, remained in the game, but their offense struggled at times, and in the end, came up short as Colorado State a big upset and Arizona’s national title hopes vanished for good and fell out of the top ten rankings.

=== Washington State ===
On the road at No. 20 Washington State, Arizona attempted to get back to winning after being stunned by Colorado State. The Desert Swarm buzzed around the Cougars’ offense and held them to a single touchdown. Later in the game, the Wildcats scored on a field to lead and the Cougars had one final chance. For the second straight year, Washington State missed a field goal in the final seconds that cost them a tie, leading to a Wildcat win.

=== UCLA ===
The Wildcats returned home for a showdown with UCLA, who defeated Arizona in the previous season that led to both teams sharing the Pac-10 title (along with USC). This season, the result was different. After falling behind early, Arizona stormed back and took control of the game in the second half with a combination of an improved offense and the Desert Swarm to avenge their 1993 loss to the Bruins.

=== Oregon ===
The Wildcats went to Eugene for a big test with Oregon. The Ducks, who, like Arizona, was in the hunt for the Pac-10 title and Rose Bowl. Both teams’ defenses would shut down each other’s offense for most of the game. Arizona led 9-0 at halftime, but would make mistakes in the second half, which allowed Oregon to take the lead by the fourth quarter. The Wildcats tried to threaten late, but their drive stalled and the Ducks held on for the single-point victory. The loss seemingly jeopardized the Wildcats’ Rose Bowl chances, but they were still in the hunt for it.

=== California ===
For homecoming weekend, the Wildcats faced California, who came back to beat Arizona in 1993 that cost the Wildcats a shot at the Rose Bowl. A dominant performance by the Desert Swarm would keep Arizona in the game. In the second quarter, Cal threatened in Arizona territory near the goal, but the Swarm came up big by foiling a trick play by forcing an interception and returned it 97 yards for a touchdown. The Wildcats would add a pair of field goals to lead 13-6. Late in the fourth quarter, the Golden Bears had a chance, but Arizona’s defense would again stop them with a pair of sacks, and Arizona got revenge for their loss to the Bears in the previous year, and also kept their Rose Bowl hopes alive. The returned interception was Arizona’s only touchdown of the game and it was also their second consecutive game without an offensive score.

=== USC ===
Arizona went back on the road to travel to Southern California and faced the Trojans. USC’s offense became a problem for Arizona’s Desert Swarm, and was too much for them. The Wildcats finally got some offensive touchdowns, but it wasn’t enough and USC dropped Arizona to third in the Pac-10 standings, which ended the Wildcats’ Rose Bowl hopes.

=== Arizona State ===
In the annual “Duel in the Desert”, the Wildcats hosted Arizona State. The Desert Swarm gave the Sun Devils problems early, though Arizona’s offense would have drives stalled, which led to field goals. ASU would later grab momentum and led 27-15 early in the fourth quarter.

The Wildcats would pick up rhythm on offense and got a touchdown to climb closer midway through the quarter. After making a stop by the Swarm, Arizona would get the ball back and found the end zone for another touchdown to regain the lead with under four minutes to go. Arizona State would then have one last chance, and drove into Wildcat territory. However, they would barely miss a field goal by inches that would have potentially given them the win. Instead, the Wildcats got their first win over ASU at home since 1990. It was the Arizona’s largest comeback win the rivalry since 1985 (when they rallied from ten down to win that year). It also gave the Wildcats their eighth win of the season.

=== Utah (Freedom Bowl) ===
Arizona was selected to play in the Freedom Bowl in Anaheim against Utah. The Wildcats would get off to an early start and scored first. Utah tied it early in the second quarter and the game remained tied until the fourth quarter when Arizona connected on a field goal to take the lead. The Desert Swarm would the force a turnover and Arizona was in position to take control. However, mistakes and dropped passes led to another field goal, which kept the Utes in it. After getting a safety later in the quarter, Utah drove down the field and scored to get the lead. The Wildcats tried to respond, but would lose a fumble and Utah would run out the clock for the win. Arizona’s season ended with a record of 8–4.

== Roster ==
1994 Arizona Wildcats football team roster
Players
Coaches
Offense

Pos.	#	Name	Class
TE	88	Mike Lucky	Fr
C	75	Hicham El-Mashtoub	Sr
QB	16	Dan White	Jr

Defense

Pos.	#	Name	Class
FS	3	Tony Bouie	Sr
DE	68	Tedy Bruschi	Jr
LB	35	Chester Burnett	So
LB	49	Sean Harris	Sr
DT	71	Chuck Osborne	Jr
DT	56	Joe Salave'a	So
SS	18	Brandon Sanders	Jr
CB	22	Mike Scurlock	Sr
LB	42	Jimmy Sprotte	Fr
LB	37	Armon Williams	So

Special teams

Pos.	#	Name	Class
K	28	Steve McLaughlin	Sr

Head coach

- Dick Tomey

Coordinators/assistant coaches

Legend

- (C) Team captain
- (S) Suspended
- (I) Ineligible
- Injured
- Redshirt

== Awards and honors ==
- Tony Bouie, FS, Consensus All-American
- Tedy Bruschi, DE, Consensus and AP All-American
- Steve McLaughlin, K, Lou Groza Award winner, Consensus All-American

== Season notes ==
- Arizona started the season on a good promise, only to falter due to a struggling offense, though the defense continued to be dominant.
- Arizona Stadium’s attendance for home games increased this season, with the team’s performance from the 1993 as well as the Desert Swarm’s dominance being factors in having more fans at the games.
- After the successful 1993 season and the Desert Swarm performance, many Arizona fans believed that a dynasty was being built under Tomey heading into this season, though the team seemed to have played mediocre late in the season.
- The opener at Georgia Tech was the only Arizona road game in the season that was played in prime time, as all of the other road games were played in the daytime.
- To date, this season remains the last time Arizona and New Mexico State met on the field. Since 1951, all games between the two teams were played in Tucson, with the last game played in Las Cruces was in 1949. New Mexico State would not return to Tucson again until 2017 when they defeated Utah State in the Arizona Bowl.
- Many fans believed that the loss to Colorado State began a downfall for the Wildcats for the season. Although they partially recovered, the losses to both Oregon and USC would cost the team a chance at the Rose Bowl, which was their main goal to accomplish.
- This would be the closest that the Wildcats would ever come to beating Oregon on the road under Tomey’s tenure, as all of his wins against the Ducks were in Tucson. He would resign after the 2000 season, though he came close to defeating the Ducks in Eugene that year.
- Arizona's win over Arizona State matched their smallest margin of victory (one point) against them, with their win over ASU in 1955 also by a single point. ASU would later win by a point in 2010 and 2018.
- The Freedom Bowl proved to be the final one played, with the Wildcats on the losing end.
- Had Arizona won the Pac-10, Tedy Bruschi, one of the leaders of the Desert Swarm, would have likely won the conference’s defensive player of the year award.
- The Freedom Bowl proved to be the final one played, with the Wildcats on the losing end, despite Bruschi being named the bowl’s defensive MVP in Arizona’s loss. After this, the Wildcats and Utes would not meet again until 2002.
- With Arizona out of the Rose Bowl picture after their loss to USC, fans started to lose interest and would shift to basketball due to that team starting the season after a Final Four run the previous season. After the Wildcats beat Arizona State in the regular season finale, the fans regained interest for the football program again as they still believed in the team winning.
- Arizona kicker Steve McLaughlin became more of the Wildcats’ scorer during the season due to making many field goals frequently. For his efforts, McLaughlin would win the Groza Award as the nation’s best kicker, and remains the first only Arizona kicker to win the award. Wildcat fans would rate McLaughlin as the second-best kicker in program history, behind Max Zendejas.

== Team players drafted into the NFL ==
Player	Position	Round	Pick	NFL club
Steve McLaughlin	Kicker	3	82	St. Louis Rams
Sean Harris	Linebacker	3	83	Chicago Bears
Mike Scurlock	Defensive back	5	140	St. Louis Rams
Hicham El-Mashtoub	Center	6	174	Houston Oilers
