= 1994 Oregon Ducks football team =

American college football season

1994 Oregon Ducks football

Pac-10 champion

Rose Bowl, L 20–38 vs. Penn State
- Conference: Pacific-10 Conference

Ranking
- Coaches: No. 11
- AP: No. 11
- Record: 9–4 (7–1 Pac-10)
- Head coach: Rich Brooks (18th season)
- Offensive coordinator: Mike Bellotti (6th season)
- Offensive scheme: Pro-style
- Defensive coordinator: Nick Aliotti (2nd season)
- Base defense: 4–3
- Captain: Game captains
- Home stadium: Autzen Stadium

1994 Pacific-10 Conference football standings
	Conf.					Overall
Team	W		L		T	W		L		T
No. 11 Oregon $	7	–	1	–	0	9	–	4	–	0
No. 13 USC	6	–	2	–	0	8	–	3	–	1
No. 20 Arizona	6	–	2	–	0	8	–	4	–	0
No. 21 Washington State	5	–	3	–	0	8	–	4	–	0
Washington	4	–	4	–	0	7	–	4	–	0
UCLA	3	–	5	–	0	5	–	6	–	0
California	3	–	5	–	0	4	–	7	–	0
Oregon State	2	–	6	–	0	4	–	7	–	0
Stanford	2	–	6	–	0	3	–	7	–	1
Arizona State	2	–	6	–	0	3	–	8	–	0
$ – Conference champion; Rankings from AP Poll

The 1994 Oregon Ducks football team represented the University of Oregon in the Pacific-10 Conference during the 1994 NCAA Division I-A football season. The Ducks were led by head coach Rich Brooks, who was in his 18th and final season as head coach, and played their home games at Autzen Stadium in Eugene, Oregon.

Oregon was 9–3 in the regular season and won their first ever outright conference championship (7–1); they appeared in the Rose Bowl for the first time in 37 years. After the season, Rich Brooks would accept the coaching job for the recently relocated St. Louis Rams.

Two consecutive non-conference losses in September had many calling for Brooks' resignation.

== Schedule ==
Date	Time	Opponent	Rank	Site	TV	Result	Attendance
September 3	1:00 pm	Portland State*		Autzen Stadium; Eugene, OR		W 58–16	30,505
September 10	10:00 pm	at Hawaii*		Aloha Stadium; Halawa, HI	OSN	L 16–36	37,214
September 17	1:00 pm	Utah*		Autzen Stadium; Eugene, OR		L 16–34	25,358
September 24	1:00 pm	Iowa*		Autzen Stadium; Eugene, OR		W 40–18	29,287
October 1	3:30 pm	at No. 19 USC		Los Angeles Memorial Coliseum; Los Angeles, CA (rivalry)	Prime	W 22–7	44,232
October 8	2:00 pm	at No. 17 Washington State		Martin Stadium; Pullman, WA		L 7–21	37,600
October 15	1:00 pm	California		Autzen Stadium; Eugene, OR		W 23–7	30,678
October 22	12:30 pm	No. 9 Washington		Autzen Stadium; Eugene, OR (rivalry)	ABC	W 31–20	44,134
October 29	12:30 pm	No. 11 Arizona		Autzen Stadium; Eugene, OR	ABC	W 10–9	36,960
November 5	1:00 pm	Arizona State	No. 21	Autzen Stadium; Eugene, OR		W 34–10	41,693
November 12	3:30 pm	at Stanford	No. 15	Stanford Stadium; Stanford, CA (rivalry)	Prime	W 55–21	43,802
November 19	12:30 pm	at Oregon State	No. 12	Parker Stadium; Corvallis, OR (Civil War)	ABC	W 17–13	37,010
January 2	1:30 pm	vs. No. 2 Penn State*	No. 12	Rose Bowl; Pasadena, CA (Rose Bowl)	ABC	L 20–38	102,247
*Non-conference game; Rankings from AP Poll released prior to the game; All times are in Pacific time

== Game summaries ==
=== Iowa ===
Iowa at Oregon

Team	1	2	3	4	Total
Hawkeyes	12	0	6	0	18
• Ducks	7	20	13	0	40

- Date: September 24
- Location: Autzen Stadium, Eugene, Oregon
- Game attendance: 29,287

Scoring summary
1	Oregon	Whittle 6-yard run (Belden kick)	Oregon 7–0
1	Iowa	Sedrick Shaw 1-yard run (kick blocked)	Oregon 7–6
1	Iowa	Harold Jasper 68-yard punt return (kick blocked)	Iowa 12–7
2	Oregon	Spence 5-yard pass from O'Neil (run failed)	Oregon 13–12
2	Oregon	Whittle 2-yard run (Belden kick)	Oregon 20–12
2	Oregon	Whittle 9-yard run (Belden kick)	Oregon 27–12
3	Oregon	Philyaw 6-yard pass from O'Neil (Belden kick)	Oregon 34–12
3	Iowa	Kahl 1-yard run (pass failed)	Oregon 34–18
3	Oregon	Philyaw 1-yard run (pass failed)	Oregon 40–18

=== Washington ===
Washington at Oregon

Team	1	2	3	4	Total
No. 9 Huskies	0	13	0	7	20
• Ducks	0	14	3	14	31

- Date: October 22
- Location: Autzen Stadium
- Game attendance: 44,134
- Game weather: Sunny

Scoring summary
Q2	WASH	Wales 38 yard field goal	WASH 3–0
Q2	ORE	Philylaw 8 yard run (Belden kick)	ORE 7–3
Q2	ORE	Whittle 5 yard run (Belden kick)	ORE 14–3
Q2	WASH	Bjornson 51 yard pass from Huard (Wales kick)	ORE 14–10
Q2	WASH	Wales 29 yard field goal	ORE 14–13
Q3	ORE	Belden 45 yard field goal	ORE 17–13
Q4	WASH	Thomas 10 yard run (Wales kick)	WASH 20–17
Q4	ORE	Jones 12 yard run (Belden kick)	ORE 24–20
Q4	ORE	Wheaton 97 yard interception return (Belden kick)	ORE 31–20

In previous matchups, Oregon had their share of disappointment: Mark Lee returned a punt 59 yards for touchdown to win the game in 1979. The defense held the #9-ranked Huskies to 109 yards and 3 first downs in 1984, but still fell 17–10. This, combined with Washington's 17–4 record against the Ducks, including a five-game win streak, had many Oregon fans fearing the worst.

In the 1994 edition of the heated rivalry with the University of Washington, the #9-ranked Huskies came into Autzen Stadium with a 5–1 record, including a victory over the University of Miami, snapping a 58-game home winning streak. The game was a tough and close contest, with the Ducks clinging to a 24–20 lead late in the game. Washington quarterback Damon Huard guided the Huskies to a first down on the 9 yard line with plenty of time remaining. Huard dropped back and whipped the ball towards wide receiver Dave Janoski. Ducks freshman cornerback Kenny Wheaton stepped in front of the pass, intercepted it and headed up the sideline for a clinching touchdown, putting Oregon ahead for good 31–20. A replay of the interception—now referred to as "The Pick"—is played at every Ducks home game before the team runs onto the field.

=== Rose Bowl ===
Penn State vs. Oregon

Team	1	2	3	4	Total
• No. 2 Nittany Lions	7	7	14	10	38
No. 12 Ducks	7	0	7	6	20

- Date: January 2
- Location: Rose Bowl, Pasadena, CA
- Game attendance: 102,247
- Referee: Courtney Mauzy
- TV announcers (ABC): Keith Jackson and Bob Griese

Scoring summary
1	10:50	PSU	Carter 83-yard run (Conway kick)	PSU 7-0
1	10:05	ORE	Wilcox 1-yard pass from O'Neil (Bolden kick)	Tied 7-7
2	1:36	PSU	Milne 1-yard run (Conway kick)	PSU 14-7
3	4:54	ORE	McLemore 17-yard pass from O'Neil (Bolden kick)	Tied 14-14
3	3:53	PSU	Carter 17-yard run (Conway kick)	PSU 21-14
3	2:01	PSU	Carter 1-yard run (Conway kick)	PSU 28-14
4	5:43	PSU	Conway 43-yard field goal	PSU 31-14
4	4:24	PSU	Witman 9-yard run (Barninger kick)	PSU 38-14
4	2:44	ORE	Whittle 3-yard run (pass failed)	PSU 38-20

== Roster ==
1994 Oregon Ducks football team roster
Players
Coaches
Offense

Pos.	#	Name	Class
QB	10	Tony Graziani	So
WR	83	Pat Johnson	Fr
WR	1	Cristin McLemore	Jr
QB	16	Danny O'Neil	Sr
RB	12	Dino Philyaw	Sr
TE	82	Blake Spence	Fr
RB	14	Ricky Whittle	Jr
TE	90	Josh Wilcox	So

Defense

Pos.	#	Name	Class
DB	7	Chad Cota	Sr
LB	47	Reggie Jordan
DB	1	Alex Molden	Jr
DB	4	Herman O'Berry (injured)	Sr
CB		Kenny Wheaton	Fr

Special teams

Pos.	#	Name	Class
K/P		Matt Belden	Jr

Head coach

- Rich Brooks (18th year)

Coordinators/assistant coaches

- Mike Bellotti – OC
- Nick Aliotti – DC

Legend

- (C) Team captain
- (S) Suspended
- (I) Ineligible
- Injured
- Redshirt
