= 1994 Arizona State Sun Devils football team =

American college football season

1994 Arizona State Sun Devils football
- Conference: Pacific-10 Conference
- Record: 3–8 (2–6 Pac-10)
- Head coach: Bruce Snyder (3rd season)
- Offensive coordinator: Dan Cozzetto (3rd season)
- Defensive coordinator: Kent Baer (3rd season)
- Home stadium: Sun Devil Stadium

1994 Pacific-10 Conference football standings
	Conf.					Overall
Team	W		L		T	W		L		T
No. 11 Oregon $	7	–	1	–	0	9	–	4	–	0
No. 13 USC	6	–	2	–	0	8	–	3	–	1
No. 20 Arizona	6	–	2	–	0	8	–	4	–	0
No. 21 Washington State	5	–	3	–	0	8	–	4	–	0
Washington	4	–	4	–	0	7	–	4	–	0
UCLA	3	–	5	–	0	5	–	6	–	0
California	3	–	5	–	0	4	–	7	–	0
Oregon State	2	–	6	–	0	4	–	7	–	0
Stanford	2	–	6	–	0	3	–	7	–	1
Arizona State	2	–	6	–	0	3	–	8	–	0
$ – Conference champion; Rankings from AP Poll

The 1994 Arizona State Sun Devils football team represented Arizona State University as a member of the Pacific-10 Conference (Pac-10) during the 1994 NCAA Division I-A football season. In their third season under head coach Bruce Snyder, the Sun Devils compiled an overall record of 3–8 with a mark of 2–6 in conference play, placing in three-way tie for eighth at the bottom of the Pac-10 standings. The team played home games at Sun Devil Stadium in Tempe, Arizona.

Arizona State athletic director, Charles Harris, was put under review after the 1994 season due to over 20 Sun Devils athletes getting into legal trouble.

== Schedule ==
Date	Time	Opponent	Site	TV	Result	Attendance
September 3	7:00 pm	Oregon State	Sun Devil Stadium; Tempe, AZ	PSN	W 22–16	44,628
September 10	7:00 pm	No. 5 Miami (FL)*	Sun Devil Stadium; Tempe, AZ	ESPN	L 10–47	48,729
September 17	7:00 pm	Louisville*	Sun Devil Stadium; Tempe, AZ	PSN	L 22–25	45,411
September 24	12:30 pm	at California	California Memorial Stadium; Berkeley, CA		L 21–25	37,000
October 8	7:00 pm	Stanford	Sun Devil Stadium; Tempe, AZ		W 36–35	49,051
October 15	12:30 pm	at No. 9 Washington	Husky Stadium; Seattle, WA		L 14–35	69,335
October 22	7:00 pm	No. 23 Washington State^{†}	Sun Devil Stadium; Tempe, AZ	PSN	L 21–28	46,494
October 29	11:00 am	at No. 20 BYU*	Cougar Stadium; Provo, UT		W 36–15	65,208
November 5	2:00 pm	at No. 21 Oregon	Autzen Stadium; Eugene, OR		L 10–34	41,693
November 12	8:00 pm	UCLA	Sun Devil Stadium; Tempe, AZ	ESPN	L 23–59	46,498
November 25	4:00 pm	at No. 16 Arizona	Arizona Stadium; Tucson, AZ (rivalry)	ABC	L 27–28	58,810
*Non-conference game; ^{†}Homecoming; Rankings from AP Poll released prior to the game; All times are in Mountain time

== Roster ==
1994 Arizona State Sun Devils football team roster
Players
Coaches
Offense

Pos.	#	Name	Class
RB	8	Terry Battle	So
TE	82	Steve Bush	So
OT	75	Jeff Kysar	Sr
QB	16	Jake Plummer	So
WR	3	Keith Poole	So
FB	34	Ryan Wood	Jr

Defense

Pos.	#	Name	Class
LB	12	Jason Kyle	Sr
CB	7	Craig Newsome	Sr
LB	36	Derek Smith	So
DT	99	Shawn Swayda	So

Special teams

Pos.	#	Name	Class
K	11	Jon Baker	Sr

Head coach

- Bruce Snyder

Coordinators/assistant coaches

Legend

- (C) Team captain
- (S) Suspended
- (I) Ineligible
- Injured
- Redshirt
