= 1994 UCLA Bruins football team =

American college football season

1994 UCLA Bruins football
- Conference: Pacific-10 Conference
- Record: 5–6 (3–5 Pac-10)
- Head coach: Terry Donahue (19th season)
- Offensive coordinator: Bob Toledo (1st season)
- Defensive coordinator: Bob Field (13th season)
- Home stadium: Rose Bowl

1994 Pacific-10 Conference football standings
| | Conf. | | | | | Overall |
| Team | W | | L | | T | W | | L | | T |
|---|---|---|---|---|---|---|---|---|---|---|
| No. 11 Oregon $ | 7 | – | 1 | – | 0 | 9 | – | 4 | – | 0 |
| No. 13 USC | 6 | – | 2 | – | 0 | 8 | – | 3 | – | 1 |
| No. 20 Arizona | 6 | – | 2 | – | 0 | 8 | – | 4 | – | 0 |
| No. 21 Washington State | 5 | – | 3 | – | 0 | 8 | – | 4 | – | 0 |
| Washington | 4 | – | 4 | – | 0 | 7 | – | 4 | – | 0 |
| UCLA | 3 | – | 5 | – | 0 | 5 | – | 6 | – | 0 |
| California | 3 | – | 5 | – | 0 | 4 | – | 7 | – | 0 |
| Oregon State | 2 | – | 6 | – | 0 | 4 | – | 7 | – | 0 |
| Stanford | 2 | – | 6 | – | 0 | 3 | – | 7 | – | 1 |
| Arizona State | 2 | – | 6 | – | 0 | 3 | – | 8 | – | 0 |
$ – Conference champion; Rankings from AP Poll

The 1994 UCLA Bruins football team represented the University of California, Los Angeles (UCLA) as a member of the Pacific-10 Conference (Pac-10) during the 1994 NCAA Division I-A football season. Led by 19th-year head coach Terry Donahue, the Bruins compiled an overall record of 5–6 with a mark of 3–5 in conference play, tying for sixth place in the Pac-10. UCLA played home games at the Rose Bowl in Pasadena, California.

== Schedule ==
| Date | Time | Opponent | Rank | Site | TV | Result | Attendance | Source |
|---|---|---|---|---|---|---|---|---|
| September 3 | 5:00 pm | No. 13 Tennessee* | No. 14 | Rose Bowl; Pasadena, CA | ABC | W 25–23 | 55,169 | |
| September 10 | 3:30 pm | SMU* | No. 13 | Rose Bowl; Pasadena, CA | PSN | W 17–10 | 40,638 | |
| September 17 | 12:30 pm | at No. 2 Nebraska* | No. 13 | Memorial Stadium; Lincoln, NE (College GameDay) | ABC | L 21–49 | 75,687 | |
| September 24 | 3:30 pm | No. 22 Washington State | No. 18 | Rose Bowl; Pasadena, CA | PSN | L 0–21 | 42,877 | |
| October 1 | 12:30 pm | at No. 12 Washington | | Husky Stadium; Seattle, WA | ABC | L 10–37 | 71,851 | |
| October 8 | 12:30 pm | at California | | California Memorial Stadium; Berkeley, CA (rivalry) | ABC | L 7–26 | 51,000 | |
| October 15 | 7:00 pm | Oregon State | | Rose Bowl; Pasadena, CA | PSN | L 14–23 | 35,347 | |
| October 22 | 12:30 pm | at No. 14 Arizona | | Arizona Stadium; Tucson, AZ | ABC | L 24–34 | 58,817 | |
| October 29 | 3:30 pm | Stanford | | Rose Bowl; Pasadena, CA (rivalry) | | W 31–30 | 42,429 | |
| November 12 | 7:00 pm | at Arizona State | | Sun Devil Stadium; Tempe, AZ | ESPN | W 59–23 | 46,498 | |
| November 19 | 12:30 pm | No. 13 USC | | Rose Bowl; Pasadena, CA (Victory Bell) | ABC | W 31–19 | 91,815 | |
*Non-conference game; Rankings from AP Poll released prior to the game; All times are in Pacific time

== Roster ==
1994 UCLA Bruins football team roster
Players
Coaches
Offense

| Pos. | # | Name | Class |
|---|---|---|---|
| WR | 86 | Brent Brennan | Sr |
| QB | 15 | Wayne Cook | Sr |
| C | 58 | Mike Flanagan | Jr |
| RB | 20 | Skip Hicks | Fr |
| WR | 4 | Kevin Jordan | Jr |
| OT | 79 | Jonathan Ogden | Jr |
| WR | 18 | J. J. Stokes | Sr |

Defense

| Pos. | # | Name | Class |
|---|---|---|---|
| LB | 23 | Donnie Edwards | Jr |
| CB | 21 | Carl Greenwood | Sr |
| DT | 93 | Travis Kirschke | So |
| LB | 97 | Phillip Ward | So |

Special teams

| Pos. | # | Name | Class |

Head coach

- Terry Donahue

Coordinators/assistant coaches

Legend

- (C) Team captain
- (S) Suspended
- (I) Ineligible
- Injured
- Redshirt

== Awards and honors ==
- All-Americans: Kevin Jordan (FL), Donnie Edwards (OLB, second team), Darren Schager (P, second team)
- All-Conference First Team: Donnie Edwards (LB), Mike Flanagan (C), Jonathan Ogden (OT), Darren Schager (P)
