= Carl Greenwood =

American football player (born 1972)

No. 22, 13, 6, 23
- Position: Defensive back

Personal information
- Born: March 11, 1972 (age 54); Fort Ord, California, U.S.
- Listed height: 5 ft 11 in (1.80 m)
- Listed weight: 186 lb (84 kg)

Career information
- High school: Corpus Christi (TX) Mary Carroll
- College: UCLA
- NFL draft: 1995: 5th round, 142nd overall pick

Career history
- New York Jets (1995–1996); Green Bay Packers (1997)*; Nashville Kats (1999–2000); Houston Thunderbears (2001); Detroit Fury (2002); New Jersey Gladiators (2002); Dallas Desperados (2003–2004); Corpus Christi Hammerheads (NIFL) (2005)
- * Offseason or practice squad member only

Career NFL statistics
- Tackles: 17
- Stats at Pro Football Reference

Career AFL statistics
- Tackles: 155
- Interceptions: 8
- Passes defended: 36
- Stats at ArenaFan.com

Carl Greenwood (born March 11, 1972) is an American former professional football player who was a defensive back for the New York Jets of the National Football League (NFL) from 1995 to 1996. He played college football for the UCLA Bruins and was selected by the Jets in the fifth round of the 1995 NFL draft with the 145th overall pick. He also played in the Arena Football League and the National Indoor Football League.
