= Jeff Kopp =

American football player (born 1971)

No. 52, 57, 91
- Position: Linebacker

Personal information
- Born: July 8, 1971 (age 55); Danville, California, U.S.
- Listed height: 6 ft 3 in (1.91 m)
- Listed weight: 244 lb (111 kg)

Career information
- High school: San Ramon Valley (Danville)
- College: USC
- NFL draft: 1995: 6th round, 194th overall pick

Career history
- Miami Dolphins (1995); Jacksonville Jaguars (1996–1998); Baltimore Ravens (1998–1999); New England Patriots (1999); Seattle Seahawks (2000)*
- * Offseason or practice squad member only

Career NFL statistics
- Tackles: 19
- Sacks: 1
- Interceptions: 1
- Stats at Pro Football Reference

Jeffrey Blair Kopp (born July 8, 1971) is an American former professional football player who was a linebacker in the National Football League (NFL). He played college football for the USC Trojans.

== Early life ==
Kopp attended San Ramon Valley High School in Danville, California.

== College career ==
Kopp played college football at the University of Southern California (USC).

== Professional career ==
Kopp played for the NFL's Miami Dolphins (1995), Jacksonville Jaguars (1996–1998), Baltimore Ravens (1998–1999) and New England Patriots (1999). He was selected in the sixth round of the 1995 NFL draft (194th overall) by the Dolphins.

He was head coach for the Providence School of Jacksonville Stallions.

== Post-football career ==
After football, Kopp became a police officer in the Jacksonville Sheriff's Office. He is an assistant police chief in a department that also includes former NFL players Laveranues Coles, Ernest Wilford, and Victor Salako.
