= Andrew Peterson (American football) =

Scottish gridiron football player (born 1972)

No. 60
- Position: Tackle

Personal information
- Born: June 11, 1972 (age 54); Greenock, Scotland
- Listed height: 6 ft 5 in (1.96 m)
- Listed weight: 210 lb (95 kg)

Career information
- High school: South Kitsap (Port Orchard, Washington, U.S.)
- College: Washington
- NFL draft: 1995: 5th round, 171st overall pick

Career history
- Carolina Panthers (1995)

Awards and highlights
- National champion (1991); Second-team All-Pac-10 (1994)

Career NFL statistics
- Games played: 4
- Games started: 2
- Stats at Pro Football Reference

Andrew Scott Peterson (born June 11, 1972) is an American former professional football player who was drafted and played four games with the National Football League (NFL)'s Carolina Panthers during its expansion year in 1995. He played at Tackle for four games with the Panthers in 1995, making two starts during his brief career. He later played for the Green Bay Packers. He is married to Margo Peterson of Whidbey Island, Washington, and has two daughters, Brooke Ellen Peterson born in 1997 and Brynn Hamlin born in 2000.
