= Shawn Walters =

American football player (born c.1975)

No. 31
- Position: Fullback

Personal information
- Born: 1975 (age 50–51)
- Listed height: 5 ft 10 in (1.78 m)
- Listed weight: 251 lb (114 kg)

Career information
- College: USC (1993–1996)
- NFL draft: 1997: undrafted

Career history
- Kansas City Chiefs (1997)*
- * Offseason or practice squad member only

Shawn Walters (born c. 1975) is an American former football fullback. He played college football for the USC Trojans from 1993 to 1996, and signed with the Kansas City Chiefs as an undrafted free agent in 1997.

== Career ==
He played for the USC Trojans from 1993 to 1996. He led the team with 711 rushing yards as a freshman in 1993 and as a sophomore 976 yards in 1994. He rushed for a 207 yards against Baylor in September 1994, and for 234 yards against Stanford one month later.

Walters was suspended from the team in 1995 based on allegations that he accepted money from a sports agent. He missed the last nine games of the 1995 season and the first three games of the 1996 season due to the suspension. In October 1996, Walters was cleared by the NCAA of any rules violations.

During his time at USC, Walters totaled 2,019 rushing yards and scored 23 touchdowns.

Walters was signed as an undrafted free agent by the Kansas City Chiefs. He was released by the Chiefs on August 13, 1997, during training camp.

Walters blamed the scandal for his inability to sign with a professional team. He later recalled: "It totally destroyed my career. . . . That stigma from USC was following me. I don't think anybody wanted to deal with something like that."
