= Torey Hunter =

American football player (born 1972)

No. 25
- Position: Defensive back

Personal information
- Born: February 10, 1972 (age 54); Tacoma, Washington, U.S.
- Listed height: 5 ft 9 in (1.75 m)
- Listed weight: 176 lb (80 kg)

Career information
- High school: Curtis Senior (University Place, Washington)
- College: Washington State
- NFL draft: 1995: 3rd round, 95th overall pick

Career history

Playing
- Houston Oilers (1995); Amsterdam Admirals (1996); Montreal Alouettes (1997–1998); Edmonton Eskimos (1999–2000); Montreal Alouettes (2001); Edmonton Eskimos (2001); Detroit Fury (2002)*
- * Offseason or practice squad member only

Coaching
- Western Washington (2002) Secondary coach; Idaho State (2003–2006) Secondary coach; Central Washington (2007) Wide receivers coach; Eastern Washington (2008–2010) Secondary coach & special teams coordinator; Idaho (2011) Cornerbacks coach; Idaho (2012) Cornerbacks coach & recruiting coordinator

Operations
- Edmonton Eskimos (2014–2017) Regional scout; BC Lions (2018–2021) Director of player personnel & player development

Awards and highlights
- 2× Second-team All-Pac-10 (1993, 1994)
- Stats at Pro Football Reference

Torey Hayward Hunter (born February 10, 1972) is an American former professional football player who was a defensive back in the National Football League (NFL). He was selected in the third round of the 1995 NFL draft. He played for the Houston Oilers in 1995.
