= Herman O'Berry =

American football player (born 1971)

No. 24
- Position: Defensive back

Personal information
- Born: July 11, 1971 (age 55); Sacramento, California, U.S.
- Listed height: 5 ft 9 in (1.75 m)
- Listed weight: 185 lb (84 kg)

Career information
- High school: Highlands (Sacramento)
- College: Oregon
- NFL draft: 1995: 7th round, 220th overall pick

Career history
- St. Louis Rams (1995)*, (1996)
- * Offseason or practice squad member only

Awards and highlights
- First-team All-American (1994); First-team All-Pac-10 (1994)

Career NFL statistics
- Games played: 9
- Punt return yards: 16
- Stats at Pro Football Reference

Herman Lee O'Berry (born July 11, 1971) is an American former professional football player who was a defensive back in the National Football League (NFL). He was selected in the seventh round of the 1995 NFL draft. He played nine games for the St. Louis Rams in 1996. He played college football for the Oregon Ducks.
