= Cole Ford =

American football player (born 1972)

No. 5
- Position: Placekicker

Personal information
- Born: December 31, 1972 (age 53); Tucson, Arizona, U.S.
- Listed height: 6 ft 2 in (1.88 m)
- Listed weight: 210 lb (95 kg)

Career information
- High school: Sabino (Tucson)
- College: USC
- NFL draft: 1995: 7th round, 247th overall pick

Career history
- Pittsburgh Steelers (1995)*; Oakland Raiders (1995–1997); Buffalo Bills (1998)
- * Offseason or practice squad member only

Awards and highlights
- PFWA All-Rookie Team (1995)

Career NFL statistics
- Field goal attempts: 62
- Field goals: 45
- Field goal %: 72.6
- Longest field goal: 53
- Stats at Pro Football Reference

Cole Ford (born December 31, 1972) is an American former professional football player who was a placekicker in the National Football League (NFL).

== Professional career ==
He was selected in the seventh round (247th pick overall) of the 1995 NFL draft by the Pittsburgh Steelers. Ford played between 1995 and 1997 for the NFL's Oakland Raiders.

== Legal troubles ==
Ford moved to Las Vegas in 2004 to pursue a lawsuit against the Mirage casino, demanding $5 million in damages for alleged exploitation of athletes from profiting off sports betting. The lawsuit was dismissed.

On September 21, 2004, police said that Ford fired a gun toward the house of entertainers Siegfried & Roy. Ford was arrested and charged with three counts of felony firearms charges. At a January 2005 hearing, Judge Jackie Glass ruled that Ford was incompetent to stand trial and ordered him sent to a state mental health facility to be evaluated. Ford argued that he was competent and wanted to plead guilty.
