= Don Sasa =

American football player (born 1972)

No. 96, 72, 98, 94
- Position: Defensive tackle

Personal information
- Born: September 16, 1972 (age 54); American Samoa
- Listed height: 6 ft 3 in (1.91 m)
- Listed weight: 290 lb (132 kg)

Career information
- High school: Long Beach Polytechnic (Long Beach, California, U.S.)
- College: Washington State
- NFL draft: 1995: 3rd round, 93rd overall pick

Career history
- San Diego Chargers (1995–1996); Washington Redskins (1997); Carolina Panthers (1998); Detroit Lions (1998); Chicago Enforcers (2001)

Awards and highlights
- First-team All-Pac-10 (1994)

Career NFL statistics
- Tackles: 3
- Stats at Pro Football Reference

Don Sasa (born September 16, 1972) is a former American football defensive tackle in the National Football League (NFL) for the San Diego Chargers, Washington Redskins, Carolina Panthers, and the Detroit Lions. He played college football at Washington State University and was drafted in the third round of the 1995 NFL draft.

Sasa is currently living in North Carolina with his two sons and wife.
