= 1994 California Golden Bears football team =

American college football season

1994 California Golden Bears football
- Conference: Pacific-10 Conference
- Record: 4–7 (3–5 Pac-10)
- Head coach: Keith Gilbertson (3rd season)
- Offensive coordinator: Denny Schuler (2nd season)
- Defensive coordinator: Artie Gigantino (3rd season)
- Home stadium: California Memorial Stadium

1994 Pacific-10 Conference football standings
	Conf.					Overall
Team	W		L		T	W		L		T
No. 11 Oregon $	7	–	1	–	0	9	–	4	–	0
No. 13 USC	6	–	2	–	0	8	–	3	–	1
No. 20 Arizona	6	–	2	–	0	8	–	4	–	0
No. 21 Washington State	5	–	3	–	0	8	–	4	–	0
Washington	4	–	4	–	0	7	–	4	–	0
UCLA	3	–	5	–	0	5	–	6	–	0
California	3	–	5	–	0	4	–	7	–	0
Oregon State	2	–	6	–	0	4	–	7	–	0
Stanford	2	–	6	–	0	3	–	7	–	1
Arizona State	2	–	6	–	0	3	–	8	–	0
$ – Conference champion; Rankings from AP Poll

The 1994 California Golden Bears football team was an American football team that represented the University of California, Berkeley as a member of the Pacific-10 Conference (Pac-10) during the 1994 NCAA Division I-A football season. In their third year under head coach Keith Gilbertson, the Golden Bears compiled an overall record of 4–7 with a mark of 3–5 conference opponents), tying for sixth place in the Pac-10, and were outscored by opponents 248 to 212. The team played home games at California Memorial Stadium in Berkeley, California.

The team's statistical leaders included Dave Barr with 1,077 passing yards, Reynard Rutherford with 713 rushing yards, and Iheanyi Uwaezuoke with 716 receiving yards.

== Schedule ==
Date	Opponent	Site	Result	Attendance	Source
September 10	at San Diego State*	Jack Murphy Stadium; San Diego, CA	L 20–22	40,922	
September 17	Hawaii*	California Memorial Stadium; Berkeley, CA	L 7–21	41,000	
September 24	Arizona State	California Memorial Stadium; Berkeley, CA	W 25–21	37,000	
October 1	San Jose State*	California Memorial Stadium; Berkeley, CA	W 55–0		
October 8	UCLA	California Memorial Stadium; Berkeley, CA (rivalry)	W 26–7	51,000	
October 15	at Oregon	Autzen Stadium; Eugene, OR	L 7–23	30,678	
October 22	at USC	Los Angeles Memorial Coliseum; Los Angeles, CA	L 0–61	55,213	
October 29	No. 22 Washington State	California Memorial Stadium; Berkeley, CA	L 23–26	34,000	
November 5	at No. 18 Arizona	Arizona Stadium; Tucson, AZ	L 6–13	58,374	
November 12	at No. 22 Washington	Husky Stadium; Seattle, WA	L 19–31	69,618	
November 19	Stanford	California Memorial Stadium; Berkeley, CA (Big Game)	W 24–23	75,662	
*Non-conference game; Rankings from AP Poll released prior to the game
