= 1994 Stanford Cardinal football team =

American college football season

1994 Stanford Cardinal football
- Conference: Pacific-10 Conference
- Record: 3–7–1 (2–6 Pac-10)
- Head coach: Bill Walsh (5th season)
- Offensive coordinator: Terry Shea (3rd season)
- Offensive scheme: West Coast
- Defensive coordinator: Fred von Appen (5th season)
- Base defense: 4–3
- Home stadium: Stanford Stadium

1994 Pacific-10 Conference football standings
	Conf.					Overall
Team	W		L		T	W		L		T
No. 11 Oregon $	7	–	1	–	0	9	–	4	–	0
No. 13 USC	6	–	2	–	0	8	–	3	–	1
No. 20 Arizona	6	–	2	–	0	8	–	4	–	0
No. 21 Washington State	5	–	3	–	0	8	–	4	–	0
Washington	4	–	4	–	0	7	–	4	–	0
UCLA	3	–	5	–	0	5	–	6	–	0
California	3	–	5	–	0	4	–	7	–	0
Oregon State	2	–	6	–	0	4	–	7	–	0
Stanford	2	–	6	–	0	3	–	7	–	1
Arizona State	2	–	6	–	0	3	–	8	–	0
$ – Conference champion; Rankings from AP Poll

The 1994 Stanford Cardinal football team represented Stanford University as a member of the Pacific-10 Conference (Pac-10) during 1994 NCAA Division I-A football season. Led by Bill Walsh in his fifth and final season as head coach, the Cardinal compiled an overall record of 3–7–1 with a mark of 2–6 in conference play, placing in a three-way tie for eighth at the bottom of the Pac-10 standings. The team played home games at Stanford Stadium in Stanford, California.

== Schedule ==
Date	Time	Opponent	Rank	Site	TV	Result	Attendance
September 10	9:30 a.m.	at Northwestern*	No. 24	Dyche Stadium; Evanston, IL	ESPN	T 41–41	27,436
September 17	12:30 p.m.	San Jose State*		Stanford Stadium; Stanford, CA (rivalry)		W 51–20	34,321
September 24	12:30 p.m.	No. 8 Arizona		Stanford Stadium; Stanford, CA	ABC	L 10–34	42,593
October 1	11:30 a.m.	at No. 8 Notre Dame*		Notre Dame Stadium; Notre Dame, IN (rivalry)	NBC	L 15–34	59,075
October 8	6:30 p.m.	at Arizona State		Sun Devil Stadium; Tempe, AZ		L 35–36	49,051
October 15	4:00 p.m.	USC		Stanford Stadium; Stanford, CA (rivalry)	ABC	L 20–27	60,345
October 22	12:30 p.m.	Oregon State		Parker Stadium; Corvallis, OR		W 35–29	33,259
October 29	3:30 p.m.	at UCLA		Rose Bowl; Pasadena, CA (rivalry)		L 30–31	44,529
November 5	3:00 p.m.	No. 12 Washington		Stanford Stadium; Stanford, CA		W 46–28	44,200
November 12	3:00 p.m.	No. 15 Oregon		Stanford Stadium; Stanford, CA (rivalry)		L 21–55	43,802
November 19	12:00 p.m.	at California		California Memorial Stadium; Berkeley, CA (Big Game)		L 23–24	75,662
*Non-conference game; Rankings from AP Poll released prior to the game; All times are in Pacific time

== Roster ==
1994 Stanford Cardinal football team roster
Players
Coaches
Offense

Pos.	#	Name	Class
WR	80	Justin Armour	Sr
TE	87	Tony Cline	Sr
G	78	Brad Badger	So
TE	87	Greg Clark	So
FB	34	Greg Comella	So
WR	82	Mark Harris	Sr
WR	88	Brian Manning	So
QB	18	Steve Stenstrom	Sr

Defense

Pos.	#	Name	Class
DB		Kwame Ellis	Jr
DT	72	Jason Fisk	Sr
FS, QB	5	Scott Frost	So
DE	75	Carl Hansen	Fr
LB	13	Kailee Wong	Fr

Special teams

Pos.	#	Name	Class

Head coach

- Bill Walsh

Coordinators/assistant coaches

- Terry Shea – Offensive coordinator and assistant head coach
- Bill Singler – Running backs
- Mike Wilson – wide receivers and tight ends
- Monte Clark – Offensive line
- Doug Cosbie – Assistant offensive line
- Fred von Appen – Defensive coordinator and Inside linebacker
- Dave Tipton – Defensive line
- Keena Turner – Outside linebacker
- Vaughn Williams – Defensive backs

Legend

- (C) Team captain
- (S) Suspended
- (I) Ineligible
- Injured
- Redshirt
