= Hicham El-Mashtoub =

Lebanese Canadian football player (1972–2021)

No. 60
- Position: Center

Personal information
- Born: May 11, 1972; Beirut, Lebanon
- Died: September 16, 2021 (aged 49); Montreal, Quebec, Canada
- Listed height: 6 ft 2 in (1.88 m)
- Listed weight: 288 lb (131 kg)

Career information
- High school: Georges-Vanier (Laval, Quebec, Canada)
- College: Arizona (1991–1994)
- NFL draft: 1995: 6th round, 174th overall pick
- CFL draft: 1995: Bonusth round, 5th overall pick

Career history
- Houston Oilers (1995–1996); Kansas City Chiefs (1998)*; Cleveland Browns (1999)*; Edmonton Eskimos (1999)
- * Offseason or practice squad member only

Awards and highlights
- Second-team All-Pac-10 (1994)

Career NFL statistics
- Games played: 3
- Stats at Pro Football Reference

Hicham El-Mashtoub (Arabic: هشام المشطوب; May 11, 1972 – September 16, 2021) was a Lebanese-Canadian gridiron football center who played two seasons with the Houston Oilers of the National Football League (NFL). He was selected by the Oilers in the sixth round of the 1995 NFL draft after playing college football at the University of Arizona. El-Mashtoub also played one season for the Edmonton Eskimos of the Canadian Football League (CFL).

== Early life ==
Hicham El-Mashtoub was born on May 11, 1972, in Beirut, Lebanon. He moved to Canada when he was four. He attended École secondaire Georges-Vanier in Laval, Quebec.

== College career ==
El-Mashtoub was a four-year letterman for the Arizona Wildcats of the University of Arizona from 1991 to 1994. He was named second-team All-Pac-10 by the Coaches his senior year in 1994.

== Professional career ==
El-Mashtoub was selected by the Houston Oilers in the sixth round, with the 174th overall pick, of the 1995 NFL draft. He was also selected by the Edmonton Eskimos in the opening bonus round of the 1995 CFL draft. He officially signed with the Oilers on July 20, 1995. El-Mashtoub played in two games in 1995 and one game in 1996. He was released on August 27, 1997.

El-Mashtoub signed with the Kansas City Chiefs on April 7, 1998. He was released on August 25, 1998.

El-Mashtoub was signed by the Cleveland Browns on January 8, 1999, and was later released on April 27, 1999.

El-Mashtoub dressed in all 18 games for the Edmonton Eskimos of the Canadian Football League in 1999.

== Personal life ==
On September 16, 2021, in Montreal, El-Mashtoub died of cancer at the age of 49.
