= 1994 NCAA Division I-A football rankings =

- Season: 1994
- Bowl season: 1994–95 bowl games
- Preseason No. 1: Florida
- End of season champions: Nebraska

Two human polls comprised the 1994 National Collegiate Athletic Association (NCAA) Division I-A football rankings. Unlike most sports, college football's governing body, the NCAA, does not bestow a national championship, instead that title is bestowed by one or more different polling agencies. There are two main weekly polls that begin in the preseason—the AP Poll and the Coaches Poll.

== Legend ==
	Increase in ranking
	Decrease in ranking
	Not ranked previous week
	National champion
(#–#)	Win–loss record
(Italics)	Number of first place votes
т	Tied with team above or below also with this symbol

== AP Poll ==
	Preseason Aug 21	Week 1 Aug 31	Week 2 Sep 6	Week 3 Sep 13	Week 4 Sep 20	Week 5 Sep 27	Week 6 Oct 4	Week 7 Oct 11	Week 8 Oct 18	Week 9 Oct 25	Week 10 Nov 1	Week 11 Nov 8	Week 12 Nov 15	Week 13 Nov 22	Week 14 Nov 29	Week 15 Dec 6	Week 16 (Final) Jan 3	
1.	Florida (15)	Florida (0–0) (14)	Nebraska (1–0) (23)	Florida (2–0) (27)	Florida (3–0) (33)	Florida (3–0) (31)	Florida (4–0) (39)	Florida (5–0) (44)	Penn State (6–0) (19)	Penn State (6–0) (19)	Nebraska (9–0) (33)	Nebraska (10–0) (39)	Nebraska (11–0) (39)	Nebraska (11–0) (39)	Nebraska (12–0) (38)	Nebraska (12–0) (38)	Nebraska (13–0) (51 1/2)	1.
2.	Notre Dame (13)	Nebraska (1–0) (23)	Florida (1–0) (15)	Nebraska (2–0) (22)	Nebraska (3–0) (20)	Nebraska (4–0) (22)	Nebraska (5–0) (13)	Nebraska (6–0) (12)	Colorado (6–0) (15)	Colorado (7–0) (16)	Penn State (7–0) (28)	Penn State (8–0) (22)	Penn State (9–0) (23)	Penn State (10–0) (22)	Penn State (11–0) (23)	Penn State (11–0) (24)	Penn State (12–0) (10 1/2)	2.
3.	Florida State (10)	Notre Dame (0–0) (12)	Notre Dame (1–0) (10)	Florida State (2–0) (5)	Florida State (3–0) (3)	Florida State (4–0) (4)	Florida State (4–0) (4)	Penn State (5–0) (2)	Nebraska (7–0) (25)	Nebraska (8–0) (24)	Auburn (8–0) (1)	Auburn (9–0) (1)	Florida (8–1)	Alabama (11–0) (1)	Alabama (11–0) (1)	Miami (FL) (10–1)	Colorado (11–1)	3.
4.	Nebraska (18)	Florida State (0–0) (8)	Florida State (1–0) (8)	Michigan (2–0) (2)	Michigan (2–0) (1)	Penn State (4–0) (3)	Penn State (5–0) (2)	Colorado (5–0) (4)	Auburn (7–0) (3)	Auburn (7–0) (3)	Florida (6–1)	Florida (7–1)	Alabama (10–0)	Florida (9–1)	Miami (FL) (10–1)	Colorado (10–1)	Florida State (10–1–1)	4.
5.	Michigan (2)	Michigan (0–0) (1)	Miami (FL) (1–0) (1)	Miami (FL) (2–0) (1)	Penn State (3–0) (3)	Colorado (3–0) (1)	Colorado (4–0) (3)	Michigan (4–1)	Florida (5–1)	Florida (5–1)	Miami (FL) (6–1)	Miami (FL) (7–1)	Miami (FL) (8–1)	Miami (FL) (9–1)	Colorado (10–1)	Florida (10–1–1)	Alabama (12–1)	5.
6.	Miami (FL) (1)	Miami (FL) (0–0) (1)	Michigan (1–0) (1)	Penn State (2–0) (2)	Miami (FL) (2–0) (1)	Arizona (3–0) (1)	Arizona (4–0) (1)	Auburn (6–0)	Texas A&M (6–0)	Miami (FL) (5–1)	Alabama (8–0)	Alabama (9–0)	Auburn (9–0–1)	Colorado (10–1)	Florida (9–1–1)	Alabama (11–1)	Miami (FL) (10–2)	6.
7.	Arizona (2)	Arizona (0–0) (2)	Colorado (1–0)	Colorado (1–0)	Colorado (2–0)	Michigan (2–1)	Michigan (3–1)	Texas A&M (5–0)	Miami (FL) (4–1)	Texas A&M (7–0)	Colorado (7–1)	Colorado (8–1)	Colorado (9–1)	Florida State (9–1)	Florida State (9–1–1)	Florida State (9–1–1)	Florida (10–2–1)	7.
8.	Colorado	Colorado (0–0)	Penn State (1–0) (1)	Notre Dame (1–1)	Arizona (2–0) (1)	Notre Dame (3–1)	Notre Dame (4–1)	Miami (FL) (4–1)	Alabama (7–0)	Alabama (8–0)	Florida State (6–1)	Florida State (7–1)	Florida State (8–1)	Texas A&M (10–0–1)	Texas A&M (10–0–1)	Texas A&M (10–0–1)	Texas A&M (10–0–1)	8.
9.	Penn State	Penn State (0–0)	Arizona (1–0) (2)	Arizona (2–0) (2)	Notre Dame (2–1)	Auburn (4–0)	Auburn (5–0)	Washington (4–1)	Washington (5–1)	Florida State (5–1)	Utah (8–0)	Texas A&M (8–0–1)	Texas A&M (9–0–1)	Auburn (9–1–1)	Auburn (9–1–1)	Auburn (9–1–1)	Auburn (9–1–1)	9.
10.	Wisconsin	Wisconsin (0–0)	Wisconsin (0–0)	Wisconsin (1–0)	Auburn (3–0)	Texas A&M (3–0)	Texas A&M (4–0)	Alabama (6–0)	Florida State (4–1)	Michigan (5–2)	Syracuse (6–1)	Colorado State (8–1)	Colorado State (9–1)	Colorado State (10–1)	Colorado State (10–1)	Colorado State (10–1)	Utah (10–2)	10.
11.	Auburn	Alabama (0–0) (1)	Alabama (1–0) (1)	Auburn (2–0)	Alabama (3–0)	Alabama (4–0)	Alabama (5–0)	Florida State (4–1)	Michigan (4–2)	Arizona (6–1)	Texas A&M (7–0–1)	Kansas State (6–2)	Kansas State (7–2)	Kansas State (8–2)	Kansas State (9–2)	Kansas State (9–2)	Oregon (9–4)	11.
12.	Alabama (1)	Auburn (0–0)	Auburn (1–0)	Alabama (2–0) (1)	Texas A&M (2–0)	Washington (2–1)	Washington (3–1)	Texas (4–1)	Colorado State (7–0)	Utah (7–0)	Washington (6–2)	Utah (8–1)	Oregon (8–3)	Oregon (9–3)	Oregon (9–3)	Oregon (9–3)	Michigan (9–4)	12.
13.	Tennessee	Tennessee (0–0)	UCLA (1–0)	UCLA (2–0)	North Carolina (2–0)	Miami (FL) (2–1)	Miami (FL) (3–1)	Colorado State (6–0)	Texas (4–1)	Virginia Tech (7–1)	Virginia (6–1)	Arizona (7–2)	USC (7–2)	Virginia (8–2)	Ohio State (9–3)	Ohio State (9–3)	USC (8–3–1)	13.
14.	UCLA	UCLA (0–0)	USC (1–0)	Texas A&M (2–0)	Virginia Tech (3–0)	Virginia Tech (4–0)	North Carolina (3–1)	Arizona (4–1)	Arizona (5–1)	Syracuse (6–1)	Colorado State (7–1)	Syracuse (6–2)	Virginia Tech (8–2)	Ohio State (9–3)	Utah (9–2)	Utah (9–2)	Ohio State (9–4)	14.
15.	Texas A&M	Texas A&M (0–0)	Oklahoma (1–0)	Tennessee (1–1)	Texas (2–0)	Wisconsin (2–1)	Texas (3–1)	North Carolina (4–1)	North Carolina (5–1)	Washington (5–2)	Kansas State (5–2)	Oregon (7–3)	Michigan (7–3)	Utah (9–2)	Arizona (8–3)	Arizona (8–3)	Virginia (8–3)	15.
16.	Oklahoma	Oklahoma (0–0)	Texas A&M (1–0)	North Carolina (1–0)	Wisconsin (1–1)	Texas (3–0)	Oklahoma (3–1)	Kansas State (4–0)	Syracuse (5–1)	Duke (7–0)	Washington State (6–2)	Virginia Tech (7–2)	Virginia (7–2)	Arizona (7–3)	Mississippi State (8–3)	Mississippi State (8–3)	Colorado State (10–2)	16.
17.	USC	USC (0–0)	North Carolina (1–0)	Texas (2–0)	Washington (1–1)	Washington State (3–0)	Ohio State (4–1)	Notre Dame (4–2)	Virginia Tech (6–1)	Colorado State (7–1)	Virginia Tech (7–2)	USC (6–2)	Boston College (6–2–1)	USC (7–3)	Virginia Tech (8–3)	Virginia Tech (8–3)	NC State (9–3)	17.
18.	Texas	North Carolina (0–0)	Ohio State (1–0)	Virginia Tech (2–0)	UCLA (2–1)	North Carolina (2–1)	NC State (4–0)	Syracuse (5–1)	Utah (6–0)	Virginia (6–1)	Arizona (6–2)	Duke (8–1)	Washington (7–3)	Virginia Tech (8–3)	North Carolina (8–3)	Virginia (8–3)	BYU (10–3)	18.
19.	North Carolina	Texas (0–0)	Tennessee (0–1)	Washington (1–1)	USC (1–1)	USC (2–1)	Kansas State (3–0)	Virginia Tech (5–1)	Kansas State (4–1)	Texas (5–2)	North Carolina (6–2)	Michigan (6–3)	Arizona (7–3)	Mississippi State (7–3)	Virginia (8–3)	North Carolina (8–3)	Kansas State (9–3)	19.
20.	Ohio State	Ohio State (1–0)	Texas (1–0)	USC (1–1)	Ohio State (2–1)	Ohio State (3–1)	Virginia Tech (4–1)	Washington State (4–1)	Duke (6–0)	BYU (7–1)	Michigan (5–3)	Mississippi State (7–2)	BYU (9–2)	Michigan (7–4)	Michigan (7–4)	Michigan (7–4)	Arizona (8–4)	20.
21.	Illinois	Virginia Tech (0–0)	Virginia Tech (1–0)	Oklahoma (1–1)	Oklahoma (2–1)	Oklahoma (2–1)	Syracuse (4–1)	Utah (5–0)	BYU (6–1)	Ohio State (6–2)	Oregon (6–3)	Virginia (6–2)	Utah (8–2)	North Carolina (8–3)	USC (7–3–1)	USC (7–3–1)	Washington State (8–4)	21.
22.	Virginia Tech	Illinois (0–0)	Clemson (1–0)	BYU (2–0)	Washington State (2–0)	NC State (3–0)	Washington State (3–1)	Oklahoma (3–2)	Boston College (3–2)	Washington State (5–2)	USC (5–2)	Washington (6–3)	Ohio State (8–3)	Syracuse (7–3)	BYU (9–3)	BYU (9–3)	Tennessee (8–4)	22.
23.	Washington	Washington (0–0)	Georgia (1–0)	Ohio State (1–1)	Tennessee (1–2)	Kansas State (3–0)	Colorado State (5–0)	Wisconsin (3–2)	Washington State (4–2)	Kansas State (4–2)	Duke (7–1)	BYU (8–2)	Mississippi State (7–3)	BYU (9–3)	NC State (8–3)	NC State (8–3)	Boston College (7–4–1)	23.
24.	West Virginia	Clemson (0–0)	Stanford (0–0)	Washington State (2–0)	NC State (2–0)	Colorado State (4–0)	Wisconsin (2–2)	Boston College (2–2)	Ohio State (5–2)	North Carolina (5–2)	Mississippi State (6–2)	Washington State (6–3)	Duke (8–2)	Washington State (7–4)	Washington State (7–4)	Washington State (7–4)	Mississippi State (8–4)	24.
25.	Clemson	Stanford (0–0)	Washington (0–1)	NC State (2–0)	Indiana (3–0)	Illinois (2–1)	Utah (4–0)	Duke (5–0)	Virginia (5–1)	USC (5–2)	BYU (7–2)	Boston College (5–2–1)	NC State (7–2)	Boston College (6–3–1)	Duke (8–3)	Duke (8–3)	Texas (8–4)	25.
	Preseason Aug 21	Week 1 Aug 31	Week 2 Sep 6	Week 3 Sep 13	Week 4 Sep 20	Week 5 Sep 27	Week 6 Oct 4	Week 7 Oct 11	Week 8 Oct 18	Week 9 Oct 25	Week 10 Nov 1	Week 11 Nov 8	Week 12 Nov 15	Week 13 Nov 22	Week 14 Nov 29	Week 15 Dec 6	Week 16 (Final) Jan 3	
		Dropped: West Virginia	Dropped: Illinois	Dropped: Clemson; Georgia; Stanford	Dropped: BYU	Dropped: Indiana; Tennessee; UCLA	Dropped: Illinois; USC	Dropped: NC State; Ohio State	Dropped: Notre Dame; Oklahoma; Wisconsin	Dropped: Boston College	Dropped: Ohio State; Texas	Dropped: North Carolina	Dropped: Syracuse; Washington State	Dropped: Duke; NC State; Washington	Dropped: Boston College; Syracuse	None	Dropped: Virginia Tech; North Carolina; Duke	

== Coaches Poll ==
	Preseason Aug 21	Week 2 Sep 6	Week 3 Sep 12	Week 4 Sep 19	Week 5 Sep 26	Week 6 Oct 3	Week 7 Oct 10	Week 8 Oct 17	Week 9 Oct 24	Week 10 Oct 31	Week 11 Nov 7	Week 12 Nov 14	Week 13 Nov 21	Week 14 Nov 28	Week 15 Dec 5	Week 16 (Final) Jan 3	
1.	Florida (17)	Nebraska (1–0) (20)	Nebraska (2–0) (34)	Nebraska (3–0) (33)	Nebraska (4–0) (34)	Florida (4–0) (34)	Florida (5–0) (43)	Penn State (6–0) (22)	Penn State (6–0) (28)	Penn State (7–0) (32)	Nebraska (10–0) (42)	Nebraska (11–0) (41)	Nebraska (11–0) (39)	Nebraska (12–0) (44)	Nebraska (12–0) (44)	Nebraska (13–0) (54)	1.
2.	Florida State (13)	Florida (1–0) (23)	Florida (2–0) (18)	Florida (3–0) (20)	Florida (3–0) (22)	Nebraska (5–0) (23)	Nebraska (6–0) (13)	Nebraska (7–0) (31)	Nebraska (8–0) (25)	Nebraska (9–0) (30)	Penn State (8–0) (20)	Penn State (9–0) (21)	Penn State (10–0) (22)	Penn State (11–0) (18)	Penn State (11–0) (18)	Penn State (12–0) (8)	2.
3.	Nebraska (12)	Florida State (1–0) (6)	Michigan (2–0) (5)	Florida State (3–0)	Florida State (4–0) (2)	Florida State (4–0) (1)	Penn State (5–0) (5)	Colorado (6–0) (9)	Colorado (7–0) (9)	Miami (FL) (6–1)	Miami (FL) (7–1)	Alabama (10–0)	Alabama (11–0)	Alabama (11–0)	Miami (FL) (10–1)	Colorado (11–1)	3.
4.	Notre Dame (12)	Notre Dame (1–0) (7)	Florida State (2–0) (1)	Michigan (2–0) (4)	Penn State (4–0) (3)	Penn State (5–0) (3)	Colorado (5–0) (1)	Miami (FL) (4–1)	Miami (FL) (5–1)	Alabama (8–0)	Alabama (9–0)	Miami (FL) (8–1)	Florida (9–1)	Miami (FL) (10–1)	Florida (10–1–1)	Alabama (12–1)	4.
5.	Michigan (3)	Michigan (1–0) (3)	Penn State (2–0) (2)	Penn State (3–0) (3)	Colorado (3–0) (1)	Colorado (4–0) (1)	Michigan (4–1)	Alabama (7–0)	Alabama (8–0)	Florida (6–1)	Florida (7–1)	Florida (8–1)	Miami (FL) (9–1)	Colorado (10–1)	Colorado (10–1)	Florida State (10–1–1)	5.
6.	Miami (FL) (2)	Miami (FL) (1–0) (2)	Miami (FL) (2–0) (2)	Miami (FL) (2–0) (2)	Arizona (3–0)	Arizona (4–0)	Alabama (6–0)	Florida (5–1)	Florida (5–1)	Florida State (6–1)	Florida State (7–1)	Florida State (8–1)	Florida State (9–1)	Florida (9–1–1)	Alabama (11–1)	Miami (FL) (10–2)	6.
7.	Colorado	Colorado (1–0)	Colorado (1–0)	Colorado (2–0)	Notre Dame (3–1)	Notre Dame (4–1)	Miami (FL) (4–1)	Florida State (4–1)	Florida State (5–1)	Colorado (7–1)	Colorado (8–1)	Colorado (9–1)	Colorado (10–1)	Florida State (9–1–1)	Florida State (9–1–1)	Florida (10–2–1)	7.
8.	Arizona (2)	Penn State (1–0)	Arizona (2–0)	Arizona (2–0)	Michigan (2–1)	Michigan (3–1)	Florida State (4–1)	Arizona (5–1)	Arizona (6–1)	Utah (8–0)	Arizona (7–2)	Kansas State (7–2)	Kansas State (8–2)	Kansas State (9–2)	Kansas State (9–2)	Utah (10–2)	8.
9.	Penn State (1)	Arizona (1–0) (1)	Notre Dame (1–1)	Notre Dame (2–1)	Alabama (4–0)	Alabama (5–0)	Texas (4–1)	Texas (4–1)	Michigan (5–2)	Syracuse (6–1)	Kansas State (6–2)	Oregon (8–3)	Oregon (9–3)	Oregon (9–3)	Oregon (9–3)	Ohio State (9–4)	9.
10.	Alabama	Alabama (1–0)	Wisconsin (1–0)	Alabama (3–0)	Virginia Tech (4–0)	Miami (FL) (3–1)	Arizona (4–1)	North Carolina (5–1)	Virginia Tech (7–1)	Virginia (6–1)	Colorado State (8–1)	Colorado State (9–1)	Colorado State (10–1)	Colorado State (10–1)	Colorado State (10–1)	BYU (10–3)	10.
11.	Wisconsin	Wisconsin (0–0)	Alabama (2–0)	North Carolina (2–0)	Texas (3–0)	Ohio State (4–1)	Kansas State (4–0)	Colorado State (7–0)	Utah (7–0)	Colorado State (7–1)	Oregon (7–3)	Virginia Tech (8–2)	Virginia (8–2)	Ohio State (9–3)	Ohio State (9–3)	Oregon (8–4)	11.
12.	Tennessee	UCLA (1–0)	UCLA (2–0)	Virginia Tech (3–0)	Miami (FL) (2–1)	Oklahoma (3–1)	North Carolina (4–1)	Michigan (4–2)	Syracuse (6–1)	North Carolina (6–2)	Virginia Tech (7–2)	USC (7–2)	Ohio State (9–3)	Utah (9–2)	Utah (9–2)	Michigan (9–4)	12.
13.	Oklahoma	USC (1–0)	North Carolina (1–0)	Texas (2–0)	Ohio State (3–1)	Kansas State (3–0)	Colorado State (6–0)	Virginia Tech (6–1)	Duke (7–0)	Arizona (6–2)	Duke (8–1)	Michigan (7–3)	Utah (9–2)	Arizona (8–3)	Arizona (8–3)	Virginia (8–3)	13.
14.	USC	Ohio State (1–0)	Tennessee (1–1)	Ohio State (2–1)	Wisconsin (2–1)	North Carolina (3–1)	Virginia Tech (5–1)	Syracuse (5–1)	Ohio State (6–2)	Washington State (6–2)	Utah (8–1)	Virginia (7–2)	North Carolina (8–3)	North Carolina (8–3)	North Carolina (8–3)	Colorado State (10–2)	14.
15.	UCLA	Oklahoma (1–0)	Texas (2–0)	Wisconsin (1–1)	Washington State (3–0)	Texas (3–1)	Syracuse (5–1)	Utah (6–0)	Texas (5–2)	Kansas State (5–2)	Syracuse (6–2)	BYU (9–2)	Arizona (7–3)	Virginia Tech (8–3)	Virginia Tech (8–3)	USC (8–3–1)	15.
16.	Ohio State	North Carolina (1–0)	Virginia Tech (2–0)	Oklahoma (2–1)	Kansas State (3–0)	NC State (4–0)	Notre Dame (4–2)	Kansas State (4–1)	Virginia (6–1)	Virginia Tech (7–2)	USC (6–2)	Ohio State (8–3)	Virginia Tech (8–3)	Virginia (8–3)	Virginia (8–3)	Kansas State (9–3)	16.
17.	North Carolina	Texas (1–0)	BYU (2–0)	Kansas State (2–0)	Oklahoma (2–1)	Virginia Tech (4–1)	Washington State (4–1)	Duke (6–0)	BYU (7–1)	Oregon (6–3)	Michigan (6–3)	Boston College (6–2–1)	USC (7–3)	Mississippi State (8–3)	Mississippi State (8–3)	NC State (9–3)	17.
18.	Texas	Virginia Tech (1–0)	Ohio State (1–1)	Washington State (2–0)	North Carolina (2–1)	Colorado State (5–0)	Utah (5–0)	BYU (6–1)	Colorado State (7–1)	Michigan (5–3)	Virginia (6–2)	Arizona (7–3)	Mississippi State (7–3)	BYU (9–3)	Michigan (7–4)	Tennessee (8–4)	18.
19.	Virginia Tech	Tennessee (0–1)	Oklahoma (1–1)	USC (1–1)	USC (2–1)	Syracuse (4–1)	Baylor (5–1)	Ohio State (5–2)	Washington State (5–2)	Duke (7–1)	BYU (8–2)	Duke (8–2)	BYU (9–3)	Michigan (7–4)	BYU (9–3)	Washington State (8–4)	19.
20.	BYU	Clemson (1–0)	USC (1–1)	UCLA (2–1)	NC State (3–0)	Washington State (3–1)	Wisconsin (3–2)	Washington State (4–2)	North Carolina (5–2)	USC (5–2)	Mississippi State (7–2)	Utah (8–2)	Syracuse (7–3)	Duke (8–3)	NC State (8–3)	Arizona (8–4)	20.
21.	Clemson	BYU (1–0)	Kansas State (1–0)	Indiana (3–0)	Colorado State (4–0)	Utah (4–0)	Oklahoma (3–2)	NC State (5–1)	Kansas State (4–2)	BYU (7–2)	Ohio State (7–3)	North Carolina (7–3)	Michigan (7–4)	NC State (8–3)	Duke (8–3)	North Carolina (8–4)	21.
22.	Illinois	Georgia (1–0)	Washington State (2–0)	NC State (2–0)	Syracuse (3–1)	Wisconsin (2–2)	Ohio State (4–2)	Virginia (5–1)	NC State (5–1)	Mississippi State (6–2)	Washington State (6–3)	NC State (7–2)	Duke (8–3)	USC (7–3–1)	USC (7–3–1)	Boston College (7–4–1)	22.
23.	West Virginia	California (0–0)	Kansas (2–0)	Tennessee (1–2)	Utah (4–0)	Baylor (4–1)	Duke (5–0)	Boston College (3–2)	USC (5–2)	Illinois (5–3)	North Carolina (6–3)	Mississippi State (7–3)	Baylor (7–3)	Washington State (7–4)	Washington State (7–4)	Texas (8–4)	23.
24.	Georgia	Kansas State (1–0)	NC State (2–0)	Baylor (3–0)	Illinois (2–1)	Duke (5–0)	NC State (4–1)	Indiana (5–1)	Oregon (5–3)	Ohio State (6–3)	Boston College (5–2–1)	Syracuse (6–3)	Washington State (7–4)	Tennessee (7–4)	Tennessee (7–4)	Virginia Tech (8–4)	24.
25.	Virginia	Stanford (0–0)	Indiana (2–0)	Colorado State (3–0)	BYU (3–1)	BYU (4–1)	BYU (5–1)	Illinois (4–2)	Oklahoma (4–3)	Notre Dame (5–3)	Illinois (6–3)	Baylor (7–3)	Boston College (6–3–1)	Boston College (6–4–1)	Boston College (6–4–1)	Mississippi State (8–4)	25.
	Preseason Aug 21	Week 2 Sep 6	Week 3 Sep 12	Week 4 Sep 19	Week 5 Sep 26	Week 6 Oct 3	Week 7 Oct 10	Week 8 Oct 17	Week 9 Oct 24	Week 10 Oct 31	Week 11 Nov 7	Week 12 Nov 14	Week 13 Nov 21	Week 14 Nov 28	Week 15 Dec 5	Week 16 (Final) Jan 3	
		Dropped: Illinois; West Virginia; Virginia	Dropped: Clemson; Georgia; California; Stanford	Dropped: BYU; Kansas	Dropped: UCLA; Indiana; Tennessee; Baylor	Dropped: USC; Illinois	None	Dropped: Notre Dame; Baylor; Wisconsin; Oklahoma	Dropped: Boston College; Indiana; Illinois	Dropped: Texas; NC State; Oklahoma	Dropped: Notre Dame	Dropped: Washington State; Illinois	Dropped: NC State	Dropped: Syracuse; Baylor	None	Dropped: Duke	

Auburn, Texas A&M, and Washington were ineligible to be ranked in the Coaches' Poll due to NCAA sanctions.
