= 1994 Big Ten Conference football season =

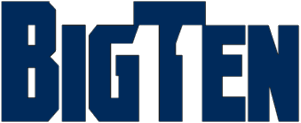
- League: NCAA Division I-A
- Sport: football
- Teams: 11
- Champions: Penn State

Football seasons
- 1993 1995

1994 Big Ten Conference football standings
	Conf.					Overall
Team	W		L		T	W		L		T
No. 2 Penn State $	8	–	0	–	0	12	–	0	–	0
No. 14 Ohio State	6	–	2	–	0	9	–	4	–	0
Wisconsin	5	–	2	–	1	8	–	3	–	1
No. 12 Michigan	5	–	3	–	0	8	–	4	–	0
Illinois	4	–	4	–	0	7	–	5	–	0
Purdue	3	–	3	–	2	5	–	4	–	2
Iowa	3	–	4	–	1	5	–	5	–	1
Indiana	3	–	5	–	0	6	–	5	–	0
Northwestern	3	–	5	–	0	4	–	6	–	1
Minnesota	1	–	7	–	0	3	–	8	–	0
Michigan State †	0	–	8	–	0	0	–	11	–	0
$ – Conference champion; † Michigan State forfeited 5 wins including 4 conference victories, over Wisconsin, Indiana, Northwestern, and Purdue.; Rankings from AP Poll

The 1994 Big Ten Conference football season was the 99th season of college football played by the member schools of the Big Ten Conference and was a part of the 1994 NCAA Division I-A football season.

== Regular season ==
In their second season as a Big Ten school, Penn State would win the conference title for the first time and represent the league in a Rose Bowl victory over Oregon. The Nittany Lions went 12-0 overall, 8-0 in the conference, and finished the season ranked No. 2.

Ohio State came in second at 6-2 (9-4 overall) and ended the year ranked No. 14. Wisconsin came in third at 5-2-1 (8-3-1 overall).

Michigan finished fourth at 5-3 (8-4 overall) and wound up No. 12 at season's end. Illinois took fifth at 4-4 (7-5 overall).

Purdue's league record was 3-3-2, with two of those ties against Wisconsin and Iowa, who finished at 3-4-1 in Big Ten play.

Indiana and Northwestern both earned 3-5 conference marks while Minnesota went 1-7 (3-8 overall).

Michigan State initially went 4-4 (5-6 overall) and tied for fifth with Illinois, but had to forfeit all of their victories due to a "lack of institutional control", which in turn gave losses-turned-victories to Wisconsin, Indiana, Northwestern, and Purdue. MSU Coach George Perles was fired before the season ended, but was allowed to finish the season, and was eventually cleared of any wrongdoing by the NCAA

== Bowl games ==
Five Big Ten teams played in bowl games, going 4-1:

- Rose Bowl: No. 2 Penn State 38, No. 12 Oregon 20
- Florida Citrus Bowl: No. 6 Alabama 24, No. 13 Ohio State 17
- Hall of Fame Bowl: Wisconsin 34, No. 25 Duke 20
- Holiday Bowl: No. 20 Michigan 24, No. 10 Colorado State 14
- Liberty Bowl: Illinois 30, East Carolina 0
