= 1995 Florida Citrus Bowl =

American college football game

1995 CompUSA Florida Citrus Bowl
Ohio State Buckeyes	Alabama Crimson Tide
(9–3)	(11–1)
Big Ten	SEC
17	24
Head coach: John Cooper	Head coach: Gene Stallings
AP / Coaches / BC; 13 / 11 / 13	AP / Coaches / BC; 6 / 6 / 6
	1	2	3	4	Total
Ohio State	0	14	0	3	17
Alabama	0	14	0	10	24
- Date: January 2, 1995
- Season: 1994
- Stadium: Florida Citrus Bowl
- Location: Orlando, Florida
- MVP: Sherman Williams, Alabama RB
- Referee: Jim Fogltance (Pac-10)
- Attendance: 71,195

United States TV coverage
- Network: ABC
- Announcers: Mark Jones, Tim Brant

The 1995 CompUSA Florida Citrus Bowl, part of the 1994 bowl game season, took place on January 2, 1995, at the Florida Citrus Bowl in Orlando, Florida. The competing teams were the Alabama Crimson Tide, representing the Southeastern Conference (SEC), and the Ohio State Buckeyes of the Big Ten Conference (Big Ten). Alabama was victorious in by a final score of 24–17. This was the 49th Citrus Bowl played.

== Teams ==
=== Alabama ===
The 1994 Alabama squad finished the regular season undefeated and as champions of the SEC Western Division, only to lose to Florida in the SEC Championship Game by one point to finish with an 11–1 record. Following their loss against Florida, the Crimson Tide accepted an invitation to play in the Florida Citrus Bowl as the SEC runner-up. The appearance marked the first for Alabama in the Florida Citrus Bowl, and their 47th overall bowl game.

=== Ohio State ===
The 1994 Ohio State squad finished the regular season with losses to Washington, Illinois and Penn State to finish with a record of 9–3. Following their victory over Michigan to end a seven-game losing streak against their rival, the Buckeyes clinched a spot in the Florida Citrus Bowl as Big Ten runner-up. Their appearance marked the third for Ohio State in the Florida Citrus Bowl, and their 27th overall bowl game.

== Game summary ==
The first quarter was scoreless, with Ohio State missing a field goal and Alabama having one blocked. Play was briefly interrupted at one point by a dog that had wandered on the field. In the second quarter Alabama reached the endzone on a nine-yard Tarrant Lynch touchdown run to cap a 16 play, 80 yard drive and take a 7–0 lead. Ohio State responded with a pair of Joey Galloway touchdown receptions. With each coming from quarterback Bobby Hoying, the first was good from 69 yards and the second from 11 to give the Buckeyes a 14–7 lead. The Crimson Tide tied the game just before the half when Sherman Williams scored from seven yards out to knot the game at 14–14. After a scoreless third, each team hit a field goal to bring the score to 17–17. Alabama scored the game-winning touchdown with only 0:42 remaining in the game when Jay Barker hit Williams for a 50-yard touchdown reception and a 24–17 Crimson Tide victory. The halftime show that day was a real spectacle, having over 2,000 cheerleaders and baton twirlers from all over the nation performing for the crowd.

Scoring summary

Quarter	Time	Drive			Team	Scoring information	Score	
Quarter	Time	Plays	Yards	TOP	Team	Scoring information	Ohio State	Alabama
2	12:39		16 plays, 80 yards		Alabama	Tarrant Lynch 9-yard touchdown run, Michael Proctor kick good	0	7
2	12:26		1 play, 69 yards		Ohio State	Joey Galloway 69-yard touchdown reception from Bobby Hoying, Josh Jackson kick good	7	7
2	7:50		5 plays, 22 yards		Ohio State	Joey Galloway 11-yard touchdown reception from Bobby Hoying, Josh Jackson kick good	14	7
2	3:56		11 plays, 80 yards		Alabama	Sherman Williams 7-yard touchdown run, Michael Proctor kick good	14	14
4	8:41		6 plays, 36 yards		Ohio State	34-yard field goal by Josh Jackson	17	14
4	4:29		5 plays, 44 yards		Alabama	27-yard field goal by Michael Proctor	17	17
4	0:42		3 plays, 63 yards		Alabama	Sherman Williams 50-yard touchdown reception from Jay Barker, Michael Proctor kick good	17	24
"TOP" = time of possession. For other American football terms, see Glossary of American football.							17	24
