= 1994 Iowa Hawkeyes football team =

American college football season

1994 Iowa Hawkeyes football
- Conference: Big Ten Conference
- Record: 5–5–1 (3–4–1 Big Ten)
- Head coach: Hayden Fry (16th season)
- Offensive coordinator: Don Patterson (3rd season)
- Offensive scheme: Pro-style
- Defensive coordinator: Bill Brashier (16th season)
- Base defense: 5–2
- MVPs: Kent Kahl; Marquis Porter; Parker Wildeman
- Captains: John Hartlieb; Harold Jasper; Ryan Terry; Parker Wildeman
- Home stadium: Kinnick Stadium

1994 Big Ten Conference football standings
	Conf.					Overall
Team	W		L		T	W		L		T
No. 2 Penn State $	8	–	0	–	0	12	–	0	–	0
No. 14 Ohio State	6	–	2	–	0	9	–	4	–	0
Wisconsin	5	–	2	–	1	8	–	3	–	1
No. 12 Michigan	5	–	3	–	0	8	–	4	–	0
Illinois	4	–	4	–	0	7	–	5	–	0
Purdue	3	–	3	–	2	5	–	4	–	2
Iowa	3	–	4	–	1	5	–	5	–	1
Indiana	3	–	5	–	0	6	–	5	–	0
Northwestern	3	–	5	–	0	4	–	6	–	1
Minnesota	1	–	7	–	0	3	–	8	–	0
Michigan State †	0	–	8	–	0	0	–	11	–	0
$ – Conference champion; † Michigan State forfeited 5 wins including 4 conference victories, over Wisconsin, Indiana, Northwestern, and Purdue.; Rankings from AP Poll

The 1994 Iowa Hawkeyes football team represented the University of Iowa as a member of the Big Ten Conference during the 1994 NCAA Division I-A football season. Led by 16th-year head coach Hayden Fry, the Hawkeyes compiled an overall record of 5–5–1 with a mark of 3–4–1 in conference play, placing seventh in the Big Ten. The team played home games at Kinnick Stadium in Iowa City, Iowa.

== Schedule ==
Date	Time	Opponent	Site	TV	Result	Attendance
September 3	1:00 pm	Central Michigan*	Kinnick Stadium; Iowa City, IA		W 52–21	66,520
September 10	2:30 pm	Iowa State*	Kinnick Stadium; Iowa City, IA (rivalry)	ABC	W 37–9	70,397
September 17	11:00 am	at No. 6 Penn State	Beaver Stadium; University Park, PA	ESPN2	L 21–61	95,834
September 24	3:00 pm	at Oregon*	Autzen Stadium; Eugene, OR		L 18–40	29,287
October 1	2:30 pm	No. 7 Michigan	Kinnick Stadium; Iowa City, IA	ABC	L 14–29	70,397
October 8	1:05 pm	Indiana^{†}	Kinnick Stadium; Iowa City, IA		L 20–27	67,138
October 15	1:00 pm	at Illinois	Memorial Stadium; Champaign, IL		L 7–47	59,573
October 22	1:00 pm	Michigan State	Kinnick Stadium; Iowa City, IA		W 19–14	68,532
October 29	1:00 pm	at Purdue	Ross–Ade Stadium; West Lafayette, IN		T 21–21	44,067
November 12	1:00 pm	Northwestern	Kinnick Stadium; Iowa City, IA		W 49–13	66,532
November 19	6:00 pm	at Minnesota	Hubert H. Humphrey Metrodome; Minneapolis, MN (rivalry)	Creative	W 49–42	53,340
*Non-conference game; ^{†}Homecoming; Rankings from AP Poll released prior to the game; All times are in Central time

== Game summaries ==
=== Central Michigan ===
Central Michigan at Iowa

Team	1	2	3	4	Total
Chippewas	7	7	0	7	21
• Hawkeyes	7	24	7	14	52

- Date: September 3
- Location: Kinnick Stadium, Iowa City, Iowa
- Game start: 1:05 PM CDT
- Elapsed time: 3:10
- Game attendance: 66,520
- Game weather: 74 °F (23 °C), Clear, Wind SE 10–15 mph (16–24 km/h)
- Referee: Steve Pamon
- Sources: Box score Archived 2019-07-05 at the Wayback Machine

Scoring summary
1	11:41	Iowa	Kahl 5-yard run (Romano kick)	Iowa 7–0
1	9:53	CMU	King 2-yard run (Blasy kick)	Tied 7–7
2	13:49	Iowa	Kahl 5-yard run (Romano kick)	Iowa 14–7
2	9:23	Iowa	Romano 38-yard field goal	Iowa 17–7
2	6:39	CMU	Johnson 1-yard run (Blasy kick)	Iowa 17–14
2	6:21	Iowa	Sedrick Shaw 80-yard run (Romano kick)	Iowa 24–14
2	1:11	Iowa	Terry 7-yard run (Romano kick)	Iowa 31–14
3	6:47	Iowa	Kahl 2-yard run (Romano kick)	Iowa 38–14
4	11:19	Iowa	Tavian Banks 11-yard run (Romano kick)	Iowa 45–14
4	3:04	Iowa	Tim Dwight 1-yard run (Hurley kick)	Iowa 52–14
4	0:18	CMU	Johnson 2-yard run (Blasy kick)	Iowa 52–21

=== Iowa State ===
Iowa State at Iowa

Team	1	2	3	4	Total
Cyclones	0	3	0	6	9
• Hawkeyes	7	6	17	7	37

- Date: September 10
- Location: Kinnick Stadium, Iowa City, Iowa
- Game attendance: 70,397
- Sources: Box score and Game recap

Scoring summary
1		Iowa	Sedrick Shaw 1-yard run (Romano kick)	Iowa 7–0
2		Iowa	Driscoll 4-yard run (kick failed)	Iowa 13–0
2		ISU	Stewart 23-yard field goal	Iowa 13–3
3		Iowa	Romano 33-yard field goal	Iowa 16–3
3		Iowa	Kahl 1-yard run (Romano kick)	Iowa 23–3
3		Iowa	Kerry Cooks 51-yard fumble return (Romano kick)	Iowa 30–3
4		Iowa	Tavian Banks 38-yard run (Romano kick)	Iowa 37–3
4	0:53	ISU	Doxzon 1-yard run (run failed)	Iowa 37–9

=== Penn State ===
Iowa at Penn State

Team	1	2	3	4	Total
Hawkeyes	0	7	0	14	21
• No. 6 Nittany Lions	35	10	0	16	61

- Date: September 17
- Location: Beaver Stadium, University Park, Pennsylvania
- Game attendance: 95,834
- Sources: Box score and Game recap

Scoring summary
1		PSU	Mike Archie 20-yard pass from Kerry Collins (Conway kick)	PSU 7–0
1		PSU	Mike Archie 35-yard run (Conway kick)	PSU 14–0
1		PSU	Yeboah-Kodie blocked punt recovery in end zone (Conway kick)	PSU 21–0
1		PSU	Ki-Jana Carter 41-yard run (Conway kick)	PSU 28–0
1		PSU	Ki-Jana Carter 4-yard run (Conway kick)	PSU 35–0
2	14:13	PSU	Mike Archie 4-yard run (Conway kick)	PSU 42–0
2		PSU	Conway 39-yard field goal	PSU 45–0
2		Iowa	Harold Jasper 26-yard pass from Ryan Driscoll (Romano kick)	PSU 45–7
4		Iowa	Scott Slutzker 1-yard pass from Ryan Driscoll (kick failed)	PSU 45–13
4		PSU	Conway 33-yard field goal	PSU 48–13
4		PSU	Slaod 5-yard run (Barninger kick)	PSU 55–13
4		Iowa	Demo Odems 26-yard pass from Matt Sherman (Shaw run)	PSU 55–21
4		PSU	Gray 4-yard run (pass failed)	PSU 61–21

=== Oregon ===
Iowa at Oregon

Team	1	2	3	4	Total
Hawkeyes	12	0	6	0	18
• Ducks	7	20	13	0	40

- Date: September 24
- Location: Autzen Stadium, Eugene, Oregon
- Game attendance: 29,287
- Sources: Box score and Game recap

Scoring summary
1	Oregon	Whittle 6-yard run (Belden kick)	Oregon 7–0
1	Iowa	Sedrick Shaw 1-yard run (kick blocked)	Oregon 7–6
1	Iowa	Harold Jasper 68-yard punt return (kick blocked)	Iowa 12–7
2	Oregon	Spence 5-yard pass from O'Neil (run failed)	Oregon 13–12
2	Oregon	Whittle 2-yard run (Belden kick)	Oregon 20–12
2	Oregon	Whittle 9-yard run (Belden kick)	Oregon 27–12
3	Oregon	Philyaw 6-yard pass from O'Neil (Belden kick)	Oregon 34–12
3	Iowa	Kahl 1-yard run (pass failed)	Oregon 34–18
3	Oregon	Philyaw 1-yard run (pass failed)	Oregon 40–18

=== Michigan ===
Michigan at Iowa

Team	1	2	3	4	Total
• No. 7 Wolverines	3	10	9	7	29
Hawkeyes	0	7	0	7	14

- Date: October 1
- Location: Kinnick Stadium, Iowa City, Iowa
- Game attendance: 70,397
- Sources: Box score and Game recap

Scoring summary
1		Mich	Hamilton 30-yard field goal	Mich 3–0
2		Iowa	Ryan Driscoll 1-yard run (Hurley kick)	Iowa 7–3
2		Mich	Tyrone Wheatley 2-yard run (Hamilton kick)	Mich 10–7
2		Mich	Hamilton 32-yard field goal	Mich 13–7
3		Mich	Tim Biakabutuka 7-yard run (kick failed)	Mich 19–7
3		Mich	Hamilton 32-yard field goal	Mich 22–7
4	12:49	Iowa	Scott Slutzker 11-yard pass from Ryan Driscoll (Hurley kick)	Mich 22–14
4		Mich	Tyrone Wheatley 12-yard run (Hamilton kick)	Mich 29–14

=== Michigan State ===
Michigan State at Iowa

Team	1	2	3	4	Total
Spartans	0	14	0	0	14
• Hawkeyes	7	3	3	6	19

- Date: October 22
- Location: Kinnick Stadium, Iowa City, Iowa
- Game attendance: 68,532
- Sources: Box score and Game recap

=== Purdue ===
Iowa at Purdue

Team	1	2	3	4	Total
Hawkeyes	0	0	0	21	21
Boilermakers	3	7	3	8	21

- Date: October 29
- Location: Ross-Ade Stadium, West Lafayette, Indiana
- Game attendance: 44,087
- Sources: Box score and Game recap

Scoring summary
1	Purdue	Bobich 32-yard field goal	Purdue 3–0
2	Purdue	Rogers 2-yard run (Bobich kick)	Purdue 10–0
3	Purdue	Bobich 20-yard field goal	Purdue 13–0
4	Iowa	Kahl 1-yard run (Brion Hurley kick)	Purdue 13–7
4	Iowa	Tavian Banks 38-yard run (Brion Hurley kick)	Iowa 14–13
4	Iowa	Sedrick Shaw 39-yard run (Brion Hurley kick)	Iowa 21–13
4	Purdue	Brian Alford 28-yard pass from Dicken (Dicken run)	Tied 21–21

=== Northwestern ===
Northwestern at Iowa

Team	1	2	3	4	Total
Wildcats	0	7	6	0	13
• Hawkeyes	7	14	14	14	49

- Date: November 12
- Location: Kinnick Stadium, Iowa City, Iowa
- Game attendance: 66,532
- Sources: Box score and Game recap

Scoring summary
1	Iowa	Jasper 38-yard pass from Sherman (Hurley kick)	Iowa 7–0
2	Iowa	Roussell 2-yard pass from Sherman (Hurley kick)	Iowa 14–0
2	Iowa	Odems 51-yard pass from Sherman	Iowa 21–0
2	NW	Schnur 12-yard run (Valenzisi kick)	Iowa 21–7
3	Iowa	Porter recovered blocked punt in end zone (Hurley kick)	Iowa 28–7
3	NW	Lundy 1-yard run (run failed)	Iowa 28–13
3	Iowa	Shaw 19-yard run (Hurley kick)	Iowa 35–13
4	Iowa	Kahl 10-yard run (Hurley kick)	Iowa 42–13
4	Iowa	Terry 71-yard run (Hurley kick)	Iowa 49–13

The 49–13 victory was Iowa's 21st consecutive over Northwestern. Freshman QB Matt Sherman, starting for the first time at Iowa, completed 19 of 24 passes for 331 yards and 3 touchdowns.

=== Minnesota ===
Iowa at Minnesota

Team	1	2	3	4	Total
• Hawkeyes	14	14	21	0	49
Golden Gophers	10	7	15	10	42

- Date: November 19
- Location: Hubert H. Humphrey Metrodome, Minneapolis, Minnesota
- Game attendance: 53,340
- Sources: Box score and Game recap

Scoring summary
1	Iowa	Odems 3-yard fumble recovery on punt (Brion Hurley kick)	Iowa 7–0
1	Minn	Darkins 56-yard run (Chalberg kick)	Tied 7–7
1	Iowa	Tavian Banks 25-yard run (Brion Hurley kick)	Iowa 14–7
1	Minn	Chalbert 32-yard field goal	Iowa 14–10
2	Minn	Rios 8-yard pass from Schade (Chalberg kick)	Minn 17–14
2	Iowa	Sedrick Shaw 46-yard pass from Sherman (Brion Hurley kick)	Iowa 21–17
2	Iowa	Sedrick Shaw 17-yard run (Brion Hurley kick)	Iowa 28–17
3	Minn	Darkins 1-yard run (Schade pass to Atwell)	Iowa 28–25
3	Minn	Osterman 80-yard pass from Schade (Chalberg kick)	Minn 32–28
3	Iowa	Odems 34-yard pass from Sherman (Brion Hurley kick)	Iowa 35–32
3	Iowa	Sherman 9-yard pass from Tim Dwight (Brion Hurley kick)	Iowa 42–32
3	Iowa	Porter 10-yard fumble return (Brion Hurley kick)	Iowa 49–32
4	Minn	Darkins 3-yard run (Chalberg kick)	Iowa 49–39
4	Minn	Chalberg 28-yard field goal	Iowa 49–42

The Hawkeyes won a high-scoring matchup at the Metrodome to salvage a .500 season.

== Roster ==
1994 Iowa Hawkeyes football team roster
Players
Coaches
Offense

Pos.	#	Name	Class
RB	22	Tavian Banks	Fr
FB	85	Michael Burger	Fr
WR	86	Anthony Dean	Sr
QB	7	Ryan Driscoll	So
WR	6	Tim Dwight	Fr
OL	67	Fritz Fequiere	Sr
WR	18	Damon Gibson	Fr
OL	79	Mike Goff	Fr
WR	1	Willie Guy	Jr
WR	83	Harold Jasper	Sr
FB	31	Kent Kahl	Sr
TE	81	Chris Knipper	Fr
WR	10	Demo Odems	So
OL	69	Matt Purdy	Sr
TE	40	Mark Roussell	Sr
RB	5	Sedrick Shaw	So
QB	12	Matt Sherman	Fr
TE	84	Scott Slutzker	Jr
RB	32	Ryan Terry	Sr
OL	73	Ross Verba	So
C	70	Casey Wiegmann	Jr

Defense

Pos.	#	Name	Class
CB	23	Plez Atkins	Fr
SS	15	Kerry Cooks	Fr
LB	45	Bob Diaco	Jr
DE	9	Bill Ennis-Inge	So
DL	91	Hausia Fuahala
CB	26	Ed Gibson	Fr
DE	42	John Hartlieb	Sr
DE	28	Jason House	Fr
CB	27	Chris Jackson
DB	8	Tom Knight	So
FS		Bo Porter
DB	3	Damien Robinson	So
DL	56	Parker Wildeman	Sr

Special teams

Pos.	#	Name	Class
K	20	Brion Hurley	So
K	17	Todd Romano	Jr

Head coach

- Hayden Fry

Coordinators/assistant coaches

- Don Patterson – Offensive Coordinator
- Bill Brashier – Defensive Coordinator
- Milan Vooletich – Defensive ends

Legend

- (C) Team captain
- (S) Suspended
- (I) Ineligible
- Injured
- Redshirt

== Team players in the 1995 NFL draft ==
Player	Position	Round	Pick	NFL club
Fritz Fequiere	Guard	6	182	Denver Broncos
