= 1994 Penn State Nittany Lions football team =

American college football season

1994 Penn State Nittany Lions football

National champion (DeVold, Eck, Matthews, NYT) Co-national champion (FACT, NCF, Sagarin) Big Ten champion Rose Bowl champion Lambert-Meadowlands Trophy

Rose Bowl, W 38–20 vs. Oregon
- Conference: Big Ten Conference

Ranking
- Coaches: No. 2
- AP: No. 2
- Record: 12–0 (8–0 Big Ten)
- Head coach: Joe Paterno (29th season)
- Offensive coordinator: Fran Ganter (11th season)
- Offensive scheme: Pro-style
- Defensive coordinator: Jerry Sandusky (18th season)
- Base defense: 4–3
- Captains: Kerry Collins; Brian Gelzheiser; Bucky Greeley; Willie Smith; Vin Stewart
- Home stadium: Beaver Stadium

1994 Big Ten Conference football standings
	Conf.					Overall
Team	W		L		T	W		L		T
No. 2 Penn State $	8	–	0	–	0	12	–	0	–	0
No. 14 Ohio State	6	–	2	–	0	9	–	4	–	0
Wisconsin	5	–	2	–	1	8	–	3	–	1
No. 12 Michigan	5	–	3	–	0	8	–	4	–	0
Illinois	4	–	4	–	0	7	–	5	–	0
Purdue	3	–	3	–	2	5	–	4	–	2
Iowa	3	–	4	–	1	5	–	5	–	1
Indiana	3	–	5	–	0	6	–	5	–	0
Northwestern	3	–	5	–	0	4	–	6	–	1
Minnesota	1	–	7	–	0	3	–	8	–	0
Michigan State †	0	–	8	–	0	0	–	11	–	0
$ – Conference champion; † Michigan State forfeited 5 wins including 4 conference victories, over Wisconsin, Indiana, Northwestern, and Purdue.; Rankings from AP Poll

The 1994 Penn State Nittany Lions football team represented the Pennsylvania State University as a member of the Big Ten Conference during the 1994 NCAA Division I-A football season. Led by 29th-year head coach Joe Paterno, the Nittany Lions compiled an overall record of 12–0 with a mark of 8–0 in conference play, winning the Big Ten title. Penn State earned a berth in the Rose Bowl, where the Nittany Lions defeated Oregon. The team played home games at Beaver Stadium in University Park, Pennsylvania.

Nebraska finished the season ranked atop both major polls, and was, thus, the consensus national champion. Penn State was selected as national champion by DeVold, Eck Ratings System, Matthews Grid Ratings, and The New York Times, and named co-champion by Rothman (FACT), National Championship Foundation (NCF), and the Sagarin Ratings.

== Schedule ==
Date	Time	Opponent	Rank	Site	TV	Result	Attendance
September 3	8:00 p.m.	at Minnesota	No. 9	Hubert H. Humphrey Metrodome; Minneapolis, MN (Governor's Victory Bell)		W 56–3	51,134
September 10	3:30 p.m.	No. 14 USC*	No. 8	Beaver Stadium; University Park, PA	ABC	W 38–14	96,463
September 17	12:00 p.m.	Iowa	No. 6	Beaver Stadium; University Park, PA	ESPN2	W 61–21	95,834
September 24	12:00 p.m.	Rutgers*	No. 5	Beaver Stadium; University Park, PA	ESPN2	W 55–27	95,379
October 1	4:00 p.m.	at Temple*	No. 4	Franklin Field; Philadelphia, PA		W 48–21	38,140
October 15	3:30 p.m.	at No. 5 Michigan	No. 3	Michigan Stadium; Ann Arbor, MI (rivalry, College GameDay)	ABC	W 31–24	106,382
October 29	3:30 p.m.	No. 21 Ohio State^{†}	No. 1	Beaver Stadium; University Park, PA (rivalry)	ABC	W 63–14	97,079
November 5	12:30 p.m.	at Indiana	No. 2	Memorial Stadium; Bloomington, IN	ESPN	W 35–29	47,754
November 12	3:30 p.m.	at Illinois	No. 2	Memorial Stadium; Champaign, IL	ABC	W 35–31	72,364
November 19	1:00 p.m.	Northwestern	No. 2	Beaver Stadium; University Park, PA		W 45–17	96,383
November 26	4:00 p.m.	Michigan State	No. 2	Beaver Stadium; University Park, PA (rivalry)	ESPN	W 59–31	96,493
January 2, 1995	4:30 p.m.	vs. No. 12 Oregon*	No. 2	Rose Bowl; Pasadena, CA (Rose Bowl)	ABC	W 38–20	102,247
*Non-conference game; ^{†}Homecoming; Rankings from AP Poll released prior to the game; All times are in Eastern time

== Rankings ==
Ranking movements Legend: ██ Increase in ranking ██ Decrease in ranking ( ) = First-place votes
	Week																
Poll	Pre	1	2	3	4	5	6	7	8	9	10	11	12	13	14	15	Final
AP	9	9	8 (1)	6 (2)	5 (3)	4 (3)	4 (2)	3 (2)	1 (19)	1 (19)	2 (28)	2 (22)	2 (23)	2 (22)	2 (23)	2 (24)	2 (10 1/2)
Coaches	9 (1)		8	5 (2)	5 (3)	4 (3)	4 (3)	3 (5)	1 (22)	1 (28)	1 (32)	2 (20)	2 (21)	2 (22)	2 (18)	2 (18)	2 (8)

== Game summaries ==
=== Minnesota ===
Penn State scored the first 56 points of the 1994 Division I-A football season.

=== Iowa ===
Iowa at Penn State

Team	1	2	3	4	Total
Hawkeyes	0	7	0	14	21
• No. 6 Nittany Lions	35	10	0	16	61

- Date: September 17
- Location: Beaver Stadium, University Park, Pennsylvania
- Game start: 12:00 p.m. EDT
- Game attendance: 95,834
- Game weather: 73°F (23°C); cloudy
- Television network: ESPN2

Scoring summary
1		PSU	Mike Archie 20-yard pass from Kerry Collins (Conway kick)	PSU 7–0
1		PSU	Mike Archie 35-yard run (Conway kick)	PSU 14–0
1		PSU	Yeboah-Kodie blocked punt recovery in end zone (Conway kick)	PSU 21–0
1		PSU	Ki-Jana Carter 41-yard run (Conway kick)	PSU 28–0
1		PSU	Ki-Jana Carter 4-yard run (Conway kick)	PSU 35–0
2	14:13	PSU	Mike Archie 4-yard run (Conway kick)	PSU 42–0
2		PSU	Conway 39-yard field goal	PSU 45–0
2		Iowa	Harold Jasper 26-yard pass from Ryan Driscoll (Romano kick)	PSU 45–7
4		Iowa	Scott Slutzker 1-yard pass from Ryan Driscoll (kick failed)	PSU 45–13
4		PSU	Conway 33-yard field goal	PSU 48–13
4		PSU	Slaod 5-yard run (Barninger kick)	PSU 55–13
4		Iowa	Demo Odems 26-yard pass from Matt Sherman (Sedrick Shaw run)	PSU 55–21
4		PSU	Gray 4-yard run (pass failed)	PSU 61–21

=== Michigan ===
Penn State at Michigan

Team	1	2	3	4	Total
• #3 Nittany Lions	10	6	8	7	31
#5 Wolverines	0	3	14	7	24

- Date: October 15
- Location: Michigan Stadium, Ann Arbor, Michigan
- Game start: 3:30 p.m. EDT
- Game attendance: 106,832
- Game weather: 66°F (19°C); partly cloudy
- Referee: Tom Quinn
- TV announcers (ABC Sports): Keith Jackson (play-by-play), Bob Griese (analyst), Lynn Swann (sideline)

Scoring summary
1	10:00	PSU	Brett Conway 24-yard field goal	PSU 3–0
1	0:46	PSU	Keith Olsommer 3-yard pass from Kerry Collins (Conway kick)	PSU 10–0
2	10:00	PSU	Brett Conway 28-yard field goal	PSU 13–0
2	5:49	PSU	Brett Conway 29-yard field goal	PSU 16–0
2	0:00	Mich	Remy Hamilton 33-yard field goal	PSU 16-3
3	14:00	Mich	Tyrone Wheatley 67-yard run (Hamilton kick)	PSU 16-10
3	10:41	Mich	Tyrone Wheatley 21-yard run (Hamilton kick)	Mich 17-16
3	6:27	PSU	Jon Witman 9-yard pass from Kerry Collins (Freddie Scott 2-point conversion pass from Collins)	PSU 24-17
4	11:37	Mich	Tim Biakabutuka 1-yard run (Hamilton kick)	Tied 24-24
4	2:53	PSU	Bobby Engram 16-yard pass from Kerry Collins (Conway kick)	PSU 31–24

=== Ohio State ===
Ohio State at Penn State

Team	1	2	3	4	Total
No. 21 Buckeyes	0	0	6	8	14
• No. 1 Nittany Lions	7	28	14	14	63

- Date: October 29
- Location: Beaver Stadium, University Park, Pennsylvania
- Game start: 3:30 p.m. EDT
- Elapsed time: 3 hours, 14 minutes
- Game attendance: 97,079
- Game weather: 66°F (19°C); clear
- Referee: Dick Honig
- TV announcers (ABC Sports): Roger Twibell (play-by-play), Dick Vermeil (analyst), and Jack Arute (sideline)

Scoring summary
1	10:49	PSU	Ki-Jana Carter 20-yard run (Brett Conway kick)	PSU 7–0
2	10:40	PSU	Ki-Jana Carter 1-yard run (Conway kick)	PSU 14–0
2	6:59	PSU	Bobby Engram, 15-yard pass from Kerry Collins (Conway kick)	PSU 21–0
2	3:26	PSU	Ki-Jana Carter 36-yard run (Conway kick)	PSU 28–0
2	0:56	PSU	Mike Archie 15-yard pass from Kerry Collins (Conway kick)	PSU 35–0
3	12:31	OSU	Chris Sanders 14-yard pass from Bobby Hoying (Josh Jackson kick failed)	PSU 35-6
3	10:57	PSU	Mike Archie 17-yard run (Conway kick)	PSU 42-6
3	6:03	PSU	Ki-Jana Carter 12-yard run (Conway kick)	PSU 49-6
4	14:38	PSU	Chris Mazyck 10-yard interception returned for touchdown (Conway kick)	PSU 56-6
4	6:31	PSU	Ambrose Fletcher 4-yard run (Barninger kick)	PSU 63-6
4	3:07	OSU	Stanley Jackson 6-yard run (Rickey Dudley 2-point conversion pass from Jackson)	PSU 63–14

=== Rose Bowl ===
Penn State vs. Oregon

Team	1	2	3	4	Total
• No. 2 Nittany Lions	7	7	14	10	38
No. 12 Ducks	7	0	7	6	20

- Date: January 2
- Location: Rose Bowl, Pasadena, CA
- Game attendance: 102,247
- Referee: Courtney Mauzy
- TV announcers (ABC): Keith Jackson and Bob Griese

Scoring summary
1	10:50	PSU	Carter 83-yard run (Conway kick)	PSU 7-0
1	10:05	ORE	Wilcox 1-yard pass from O'Neil (Bolden kick)	Tied 7-7
2	1:36	PSU	Milne 1-yard run (Conway kick)	PSU 14-7
3	4:54	ORE	McLemore 17-yard pass from O'Neil (Bolden kick)	Tied 14-14
3	3:53	PSU	Carter 17-yard run (Conway kick)	PSU 21-14
3	2:01	PSU	Carter 1-yard run (Conway kick)	PSU 28-14
4	5:43	PSU	Conway 43-yard field goal	PSU 31-14
4	4:24	PSU	Witman 9-yard run (Barninger kick)	PSU 38-14
4	2:44	ORE	Whittle 3-yard run (pass failed)	PSU 38-20

== Roster ==
1994 Penn State Nittany Lions football team roster
Players
Coaches
Offense

Pos.	#	Name	Class
RB	2	Mike Archie	Jr
TE	81	Kyle Brady	Sr
WR	11	Chris Campbell	So
RB	32	Ki-Jana Carter	Jr
QB	12	Kerry Collins	Sr
WR	10	Bobby Engram	Jr
C	60	Bucky Greeley	Sr
G	50	Jeff Hartings	Jr
OT	68	Andre Johnson	Jr
WR	83	Joe Jurevicius	Fr
RB	22	Brian Milne	Jr
G	64	Phil Ostrowski	Fr
QB	14	Wally Richardson	So
G	54	Marco Rivera	Jr
WR	31	Freddie Scott	So
FB	38	Jon Witman	Jr

Defense

Pos.	#	Name	Class
DE	69	Michael Plunkett	Jr
CB		Darron Brooks
LB	57	Matt Carroll	Fr
DT	89	Eric Clair	Jr
S	46	Marlon Forbes	Sr
LB	16	Brian Gelzheiser	Sr
LB	51	Greg Haren	Jr
S	3	Kim Herring	So
LB	92	Terry Killens	Jr
LB	44	Jim Nelson	Fr
DT	93	Brandon Noble	So
DL		Brad Scioli
LB	52	Willie Smith	Sr
DE	91	Chris Snyder	Fr
LB		Phil Yeboah-Kodie	Sr

Special teams

Pos.	#	Name	Class
K	6	Brad Aumiller	Sr
K	20	Brett Conway	So
P	28	Darrell Kania	So

Head coach

- Joe Paterno

Coordinators/assistant coaches

- Earnest Wilson (GA)

Legend

- (C) Team captain
- (S) Suspended
- (I) Ineligible
- Injured
- Redshirt

Roster

== Players in the 1995 NFL draft ==
Player	Position	Round	Pick	NFL club
Ki-Jana Carter	RB	1	1	Cincinnati Bengals
Kerry Collins	QB	1	5	Carolina Panthers
Kyle Brady	TE	1	9	New York Jets
Phil Yeboah-Kodie	LB	5	146	Denver Broncos
Brian Gelzheiser	LB	6	187	Indianapolis Colts
