= 1993 Big Ten Conference football season =

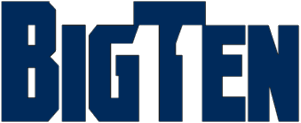
- League: NCAA Division I-A
- Sport: football
- Teams: 11
- Co-champions: Wisconsin, Ohio State

Football seasons
- 1992 1994

1993 Big Ten Conference football standings
	Conf.					Overall
Team	W		L		T	W		L		T
No. 6 Wisconsin +	6	–	1	–	1	10	–	1	–	1
No. 11 Ohio State +	6	–	1	–	1	10	–	1	–	1
No. 8 Penn State	6	–	2	–	0	10	–	2	–	0
Indiana	5	–	3	–	0	8	–	4	–	0
No. 21 Michigan	5	–	3	–	0	8	–	4	–	0
Illinois	5	–	3	–	0	5	–	6	–	0
Michigan State	4	–	4	–	0	6	–	6	–	0
Iowa	3	–	5	–	0	6	–	6	–	0
Minnesota	3	–	5	–	0	4	–	7	–	0
Northwestern	0	–	8	–	0	2	–	9	–	0
Purdue	0	–	8	–	0	1	–	10	–	0
+ – Conference co-champions; Rankings from AP Poll

The 1993 Big Ten Conference football season was the 98th season of college football played by the member schools of the Big Ten Conference and was a part of the 1993 NCAA Division I-A football season.

After being unanimously voted into the conference on June 4, 1990, Penn State began its first official football season as a member of the Big Ten for this season.

== Regular season ==
Wisconsin and Ohio State tied for the conference championship with 6-1-1 records, which included a 14-14 tie between the squads on November 6 in Madison. Wisconsin won the Rose Bowl invitation tiebreaker due to Big Ten rules which resolved first-place ties by eliminating the most recent invitee: Wisconsin had last been to the Rose Bowl in 1963, while Ohio State was in the 1985 Rose Bowl.

Penn State's first Big Ten season resulted in a third place finish at 6-2, 10-2 overall. They opened and closed their conference season with brand new trophy games against Minnesota and Michigan State.

At 5-3 in conference play, Indiana, Michigan, and Illinois tied for fourth place. Michigan State finished at 4-4, which was good for seventh.

Iowa and Minnesota tied for eighth with 3-5 conference records. Northwestern and Purdue both went winless with 0-8 records, which makes 1993 the most recent season that two Big Ten schools didn't win a conference game.

== Bowl games ==
Seven Big Ten teams played in bowl games, going 4-3 overall:

- Rose Bowl: No. 9 Wisconsin 21, No. 14 UCLA 16
- Florida Citrus Bowl: No. 13 Penn State 31, No. 6 Tennessee 13
- Hall of Fame Bowl: No. 23 Michigan 42, NC State 7
- Alamo Bowl: California 37, Iowa 3
- Independence Bowl: No. 22 Virginia Tech 45, No. 21 Indiana 20
- Holiday Bowl: No. 11 Ohio State 28, BYU 21
- Liberty Bowl: No. 25 Louisville 18, Michigan State 7
