= 1995 Rose Bowl =

American college football game

- 81st Rose Bowl Game
Penn State Nittany Lions	Oregon Ducks
(11–0)	(9–3)
38	20
Head coach: Joe Paterno	Head coach: Rich Brooks
AP / Coaches / BC; 2 / 2 / 2	AP / Coaches / BC; 12 / 9 / 11
	1	2	3	4	Total
Penn State	7	7	14	10	38
Oregon	7	0	7	6	20
- Date: January 2, 1995
- Season: 1994
- Stadium: Rose Bowl
- Location: Pasadena, California
- MVP: Ki-Jana Carter (Penn State RB); Danny O'Neil (Oregon QB)
- National anthem: Penn State Blue Band
- Referee: Courtney Mauzy (ACC)
- Halftime show: Penn State Blue Band, Oregon Marching Band
- Attendance: 102,247

United States TV coverage
- Network: ABC
- Announcers: Keith Jackson, Bob Griese

The 1995 Rose Bowl was a college football bowl game played on Monday January 2, 1995, because New Year's Day was on a Sunday. It was the 81st Rose Bowl Game. The Penn State Nittany Lions defeated the Oregon Ducks 38–20. Ki-Jana Carter of Penn State and Danny O'Neil of Oregon both were named the Rose Bowl Players of the Game. Many observers point to this game as the one that made Ki-Jana Carter a number one selection in the 1995 NFL draft.

== Teams ==
Both teams were appearing in the Rose Bowl after being away for many years. The Oregon Ducks last appeared in the 1958 Rose Bowl, 37 years prior. The Penn State Nittany Lions appeared only one other time, the 1923 Rose Bowl, when the Rose Bowl stadium was used for the game for the first time.

=== Penn State Nittany Lions ===
Penn State was playing their second season as the 11th member in the Big Ten Conference. They went undefeated through the Big Ten season and were ranked #2 going into the contest.

=== Oregon Ducks ===
Oregon opened with a win over Portland State, but then lost to non-conference opponents Utah and Hawaii. However, on October 1, 1994, the Ducks pulled off a surprise trouncing of #19 USC, a team that the Ducks had defeated only one other time since 1972. Two weeks after defeating #19 USC the Ducks upset #9 Washington in a game that sparked a period of unprecedented success in the Oregon-Washington rivalry. They would go on to win the rest of their conference games, excepting a week 6 loss to Washington State, including a 10–9 victory over Arizona. The season ended with a 17–13 win over Oregon State with the Rose Bowl on the line. Oregon finished in sole possession of first place, with Arizona and USC tied for second.

== Game summary ==
Penn State running back Ki-Jana Carter provided the highlight of the game when he scored an 83-yard touchdown on Penn State's first offensive play, prompting announcer Keith Jackson to utter, "They had him, they thought and then he was gone." After Carter's touchdown, Oregon came back to tie the game. Penn State scored again and led 14–7 at halftime, but Oregon rode the short passing game of QB Danny O'Neil and kept the ball away from the potent Penn State offense. Oregon tied the game midway through the third quarter. Penn State scored to take a 21–14 and got the ball back. Then came the key play of the game: Penn State safety Chuck Penzenik intercepted O'Neil with just over two minutes left in the third quarter, returning the ball to the Oregon 13-yard line. Carter then scored his third touchdown, a three-yard run that put the Nittany Lions ahead 28–14. Penn State went on to win in comfortable fashion, 38–20.

=== Scoring ===
==== First quarter ====
- Penn State – Ki-Jana Carter 83 run (Brett Conway kick), 10:50
- Oregon – Josh Wilcox 1 pass from Danny O’Neil (Matt Belden kick), 10:05

==== Second quarter ====
- Penn State – Brian Milne 1 run (Conway kick), 1:26

==== Third quarter ====
- Oregon – Cristin McLemore 17 pass from O’Neil (Belden kick), 4:54
- Penn State – Carter 17 run (Conway kick), 3:53
- Penn State – Carter 3 run (Conway kick), 2:01

==== Fourth quarter ====
- Penn State – Conway 43 FG, 5:43
- Penn State – Jon Witman 9 run (Michael Barninger kick), 4:24
- Oregon – Ricky Whittle 3 run (pass failed), 2:44

=== Statistics ===
Statistics	Penn State	Oregon
First downs	22	27
Total offense, yards	430	501
Rushing yards (net)	228	45
Passing yards (net)	202	456
Passes, Comp-Att-Int	20–31–1	41–61–2

== Game records ==
Team	Performance vs. Opponent	Year
Passing yards	456, Oregon vs. Penn State	1995

== Aftermath ==
Danny O'Neil contributed to 13 Rose Bowl records including individual records for passes attempted, passes completed, and passing yardage. As of 2008, his records still stood for most offensive plays (74), most passes attempted (61), most passes completed (41), and most yards passing (456).

Ki-Jana Carter was inducted into the Rose Bowl Hall of Fame as a member of the Class of 2014.

== Bibliography ==
- Oregon Ducks football media guide (PDF copy available at www.goducks.com)
- Kevin Gorman - Nittany Lions prove worth at 1995 Rose Bowl. Penn State Daily Collegian, October 29, 2001
- Penn State Bowl history
