= 1994 Ohio State Buckeyes football team =

American college football season

1994 Ohio State Buckeyes football

Florida Citrus Bowl, L 17–24 vs. Alabama
- Conference: Big Ten Conference

Ranking
- Coaches: No. 9
- AP: No. 14
- Record: 9–4 (6–2 Big Ten)
- Head coach: John Cooper (7th season)
- Offensive coordinator: Joe Hollis (3rd season)
- Offensive scheme: Singleback
- Defensive coordinator: Bill Young (7th season)
- Base defense: 4–3 stack
- MVP: Korey Stringer
- Captains: Joey Galloway; Marlon Kerner
- Home stadium: Ohio Stadium

1994 Big Ten Conference football standings
| | Conf. | | | | | Overall |
| Team | W | | L | | T | W | | L | | T |
|---|---|---|---|---|---|---|---|---|---|---|
| No. 2 Penn State $ | 8 | – | 0 | – | 0 | 12 | – | 0 | – | 0 |
| No. 14 Ohio State | 6 | – | 2 | – | 0 | 9 | – | 4 | – | 0 |
| Wisconsin | 5 | – | 2 | – | 1 | 8 | – | 3 | – | 1 |
| No. 12 Michigan | 5 | – | 3 | – | 0 | 8 | – | 4 | – | 0 |
| Illinois | 4 | – | 4 | – | 0 | 7 | – | 5 | – | 0 |
| Purdue | 3 | – | 3 | – | 2 | 5 | – | 4 | – | 2 |
| Iowa | 3 | – | 4 | – | 1 | 5 | – | 5 | – | 1 |
| Indiana | 3 | – | 5 | – | 0 | 6 | – | 5 | – | 0 |
| Northwestern | 3 | – | 5 | – | 0 | 4 | – | 6 | – | 1 |
| Minnesota | 1 | – | 7 | – | 0 | 3 | – | 8 | – | 0 |
| Michigan State † | 0 | – | 8 | – | 0 | 0 | – | 11 | – | 0 |
$ – Conference champion; † Michigan State forfeited 5 wins including 4 conference victories, over Wisconsin, Indiana, Northwestern, and Purdue.; Rankings from AP Poll

The 1994 Ohio State Buckeyes football team was an American football team that represented the Ohio State University as a member of the Big Ten Conference during the 1994 NCAA Division I-A football season. In their seventh year under head coach John Cooper, the Buckeyes compiled a 9–4 record (6–2 in conference games), finished in second place in the Big Ten, and outscored opponents by a total of 319 to 187. Against ranked opponents, they lost to No. 25 Washington and No. 1 Penn State and defeated No. 15 Michigan. They concluded the season with a loss to Alabama in the 1995 Florida Citrus Bowl. The Buckeyes were ranked No. 14 in the final AP poll.

The Buckeyes gained an average of 177.9 rushing yards and 176.1 passing yards per game. On defense, they held opponents to 115.1 rushing yards and 162.7 passing yards per game. The team's statistical leaders included quarterback Bobby Hoying (2,155 passing yards, 58.0% completion percentage), running back Eddie George (1,353 rushing yards, 5.2 yards per carry), wide receiver Joey Galloway (36 receptions for 523 yards), and kicker Josh Jackson (73 points scored). Offensive tackle Korey Stringer was a consensus first-team All-American. Four Ohio State players received first-team honors on the 1994 All-Big Ten Conference football team: Stringer; defensive linemen Matt Finkes and Mike Vrabel; and linebacker Lorenzo Styles.

The team played its home games at Ohio Stadium in Columbus, Ohio.

== Schedule ==
| Date | Time | Opponent | Rank | Site | TV | Result | Attendance | Source |
|---|---|---|---|---|---|---|---|---|
| August 29 | 9:00 p.m. | vs. Fresno State* | No. 20 | Anaheim Stadium; Anaheim, CA (Pigskin Classic) | Raycom | W 34–10 | 28,513 | |
| September 10 | 3:30 p.m. | at No. 25 Washington* | No. 18 | Husky Stadium; Seattle, WA | ABC | L 16–25 | 70,861 | |
| September 17 | 12:30 p.m. | Pittsburgh* | No. 23 | Ohio Stadium; Columbus, OH | ESPN | W 27–3 | 93,454 | |
| September 24 | 1:30 p.m. | Houston* | No. 20 | Ohio Stadium; Columbus, OH | | W 52–0 | 91,740 | |
| October 1 | 2:00 p.m. | at Northwestern | No. 20 | Dyche Stadium; Evanston, IL | | W 17–15 | 34,753 | |
| October 8 | 3:30 p.m. | Illinois | No. 17 | Ohio Stadium; Columbus, OH (Illibuck) | ABC | L 10–24 | 93,351 | |
| October 15 | 12:00 p.m. | at Michigan State | | Spartan Stadium; East Lansing, MI | ABC | W 23–7 | 74,585 | |
| October 22 | 12:30 p.m. | Purdue | No. 24 | Ohio Stadium; Columbus, OH | ESPN | W 48–14 | 92,865 | |
| October 29 | 3:30 p.m. | at No. 1 Penn State | No. 21 | Beaver Stadium; University Park, PA (rivalry) | ABC | L 14–63 | 97,079 | |
| November 5 | 3:30 p.m. | Wisconsin | | Ohio Stadium; Columbus, OH | ABC | W 24–3 | 93,340 | |
| November 12 | 12:30 p.m. | at Indiana | | Memorial Stadium; Bloomington, IN | ESPN | W 32–17 | 44,672 | |
| November 19 | 12:00 p.m. | No. 15 Michigan | No. 22 | Ohio Stadium; Columbus, OH (rivalry) | ABC | W 22–6 | 93,869 | |
| January 2, 1995 | 1:00 p.m. | vs. No. 6 Alabama* | No. 13 | Florida Citrus Bowl; Orlando, FL (Florida Citrus Bowl) | ABC | L 17–24 | 71,195 | |
*Non-conference game; Rankings from AP Poll released prior to the game; All times are in Eastern time

== Rankings ==
Ranking movements Legend: ██ Increase in ranking ██ Decrease in ranking — = Not ranked
| | Week | | | | | | | | | | | | | | | | |
| Poll | Pre | 1 | 2 | 3 | 4 | 5 | 6 | 7 | 8 | 9 | 10 | 11 | 12 | 13 | 14 | 15 | Final |
|---|---|---|---|---|---|---|---|---|---|---|---|---|---|---|---|---|---|
| AP | 20 | 20 | 18 | 23 | 20 | 20 | 17 | — | 24 | 21 | — | — | 22 | 14 | 13 | 13 | 14 |
| Coaches Poll | 16 | 16 | 14 | 18 | 14 | 13 | 11 | 22 | 19 | 14 | 24 | 21 | 16 | 12 | 11 | 11 | 9 |

== Game summaries ==
=== Fresno State ===
Ohio State Buckeyes vs. Fresno State Bulldogs

| Quarter | 1 | 2 | 3 | 4 | Total |
|---|---|---|---|---|---|
| Ohio State | 14 | 7 | 10 | 3 | 34 |
| Fresno State | 0 | 7 | 3 | 0 | 10 |

at Anaheim Stadium, Anaheim, California

- Date: August 29, 1994
- Game time: 9:00 p.m. EST
- Game weather: Clear, 81 °F (27 °C); wind 5 mph SW
- Game attendance: 28,513
- Referee: Gordon Riese

Game information
First quarter
- OSU - Eddie George 1-yard run (Josh Jackson kick)
- OSU - Joey Galloway 67-yard pass from Bobby Hoying (Josh Jackson kick)

Second quarter

- OSU - Eddie George 1-yard run (Josh Jackson kick)
- FRES - Pittman 4-yard pass from Claiborne (Lyssand kick)

Third quarter

- OSU - Josh Jackson 24-yard field goal
- FRES - Lyssand 28-yard field goal
- OSU - Joey Galloway 8-yard run (Josh Jackson kick)

Fourth quarter

- OSU - Josh Jackson 33-yard field goal

=== Washington ===
Ohio State Buckeyes at Washington Huskies

| Quarter | 1 | 2 | 3 | 4 | Total |
|---|---|---|---|---|---|
| Ohio State | 0 | 0 | 8 | 8 | 16 |
| Washington | 19 | 3 | 0 | 3 | 25 |

at Husky Stadium, Seattle, Washington

- Date: September 10, 1994
- Game time: 3:30 p.m. EST
- Game weather: Chance of Rain, 65 °F (18 °C); wind 7-14 mph
- Game attendance: 70,861
- Referee: Gordon Riese

Game information
First quarter
- WASH - Napoleon Kauffman 38-yard run (John Wales kick)
- WASH - Richard Thomas 1-yard run (pass failed)
- WASH - Eric Bjornson 25-yard pass from Damon Huard (run failed)

Second quarter

- WASH - John Wales 44-yard field goal

Third quarter

- OSU - Eddie George 24-yard run (Chris Sanders pass from Bobby Hoying)

Fourth quarter

- WASH - John Wales 22-yard field goal
- OSU - Buster Tillman 13-yard pass from Bobby Hoying (DeWayne Carter pass from Bobby Hoying)

=== Pitt ===
Pitt Panthers at Ohio State Buckeyes

| Quarter | 1 | 2 | 3 | 4 | Total |
|---|---|---|---|---|---|
| Pitt | 0 | 3 | 0 | 0 | 3 |
| Ohio State | 7 | 7 | 10 | 3 | 27 |

at Ohio Stadium, Columbus, Ohio

- Date: September 17, 1994
- Game time: 12:30 p.m. EST
- Game weather: Rain, Overcast, 73 °F (23 °C), Wind 10-20 SW
- Game attendance: 93,454
- Referee: Tom Thamerk

Game information
First quarter
- OSU – Eddie George 5-yard run (Josh Jackson kick)

Second quarter

- PITT - David Merrick 37-yard field goal
- OSU - Buster Tillman 12-yard pass from Bobby Hoying (Josh Jackson kick)

Third quarter

- OSU - Josh Jackson 27-yard field goal
- OSU - Chris Sanders 43-yard pass from Bobby Hoying (Josh Jackson kick)

Fourth quarter

- OSU - Josh Jackson 20-yard field goal

=== Houston ===
Houston Cougars at Ohio State Buckeyes

| Quarter | 1 | 2 | 3 | 4 | Total |
|---|---|---|---|---|---|
| Houston | 0 | 0 | 0 | 0 | 0 |
| Ohio State | 23 | 13 | 3 | 13 | 52 |

at Ohio Stadium, Columbus, Ohio

- Date: September 24, 1994
- Game time: 1:30 p.m. EST
- Game weather: Mostly Sunny, 78 °F (26 °C), Wind 5 SSW
- Game attendance: 91,740
- Referee: Steve Pamon

Game information

First quarter

- OSU – Chris Sanders 41-yard pass from Bobby Hoying (Josh Jackson kick)
- OSU - Eddie George 2-yard run (Josh Jackson kick)
- OSU - Safety, Burton tackled by Matt Bonhaus and Luke Fickell in the endzone
- OSU – Jermon Jackson 3-yard run (Josh Jackson kick)

Second quarter

- OSU – Rickey Dudley 11-yard pass from Bobby Hoying (Josh Jackson kick)
- OSU - Pepe Pearson 1-yard run (Josh Jackson kick)

Third quarter

- OSU - Josh Jackson 39-yard field goal

Fourth quarter

- OSU – Jermon Jackson 14-yard run (Mike Malfatt kick)
- OSU – Jermon Jackson 3-yard run (kick failed)

Top passers

- OSU – Bobby Hoying – 9/13, 136 yards, 2 TDs
- UH - Clements - 14/29, 92 yards, 2 INTs

Top rushers

- OSU – Eddie George – 11 rushes, 105 yards, 1 TD
- UH - J. Williams - 15 rushes, 75 yards

Top receivers

- OSU - Chris Sanders - 3 receptions, 60 yards, 1 TD
- OSU – Joey Galloway – 4 receptions, 44 yards

=== Northwestern ===
Ohio State Buckeyes at Northwestern Wildcats

| Quarter | 1 | 2 | 3 | 4 | Total |
|---|---|---|---|---|---|
| Ohio State | 0 | 0 | 17 | 0 | 17 |
| Northwestern | 3 | 6 | 0 | 6 | 15 |

at Dyche Stadium, Evanston, Illinois

- Date: October 1, 1994
- Game time: 12:00 p.m. EST
- Game weather: Cloudy, 61 °F (16 °C); wind 16 mph NE
- Game attendance: 34,753
- Referee: Tom Quinn

Game information

First quarter

- NU - Sam Valenzisi 40-yard field goal

Second quarter

- NU - Sam Valenzisi 33-yard field goal
- NU - Sam Valenzisi 52-yard field goal

Third quarter

- OSU - Joey Galloway 13-yard pass from Bobby Hoying (Josh Jackson kick)
- OSU - Josh Jackson 21-yard field goal
- OSU - Eddie George 6-yard run (Josh Jackson kick)

Fourth quarter

- NU - Dave Beazley 5-yard run (run failed)

Top passers

- NU - Tim Hughes - 12/23, 111 yards, 1 TD, 1 INT
- OSU - Bobby Hoying - 10/17, 103 yards, 1 TD, 2 INTs

Top receivers

- OSU - Joey Galloway 4 receptions, 41 yards, 1 TD
- NU - Darren Droller - 2 receptions, 32 yards

Top rushers

- OSU - Eddie George - 39 rushes, 206 yards, 1 TD
- NU - D. Lindy - 29 rushes, 80 yards

=== Illinois ===
Illinois Fighting Illini at Ohio State Buckeyes

| Quarter | 1 | 2 | 3 | 4 | Total |
|---|---|---|---|---|---|
| Illinois | 0 | 7 | 10 | 7 | 24 |
| Ohio State | 0 | 10 | 0 | 0 | 10 |

at Ohio Stadium, Columbus, Ohio

- Date: October 8, 1994
- Game time: 3:30 p.m. EST
- Game weather: Mostly Sunny, 80 °F (27 °C), Wind 10 SSW
- Game attendance: 93,351
- Referee: Dick Honig

Game information

Second quarter

- ILL - Ty Douthard 6-yard run (Chris Richardson kick)
- OSU - Eddie George 1-yard run (Josh Jackson kick)
- OSU - Josh Jackson 35-yard field goal

Third quarter

- ILL - Chris Richardson 32-yard field goal
- ILL - Jasper Strong 49-yard pass from Johnny Johnson (Chris Richardson kick)

Fourth quarter

- ILL - Ken Dilger 17-yard pass from Johnny Johnson (Chris Richardson kick)

Top passers

- ILL - Johnny Johnson - 16-21, 224 yards, 2 TDs
- OSU – Bobby Hoying – 18/33, 229 yards, 3 INTs

Top rushers

- OSU – Eddie George – 26 rushes, 124 yards, 1 TD
- ILL - Holcombe - 18 rushes, 79 yards

Top receivers

- OSU – Joey Galloway – 5 receptions, 87 yards
- ILL - Jasper Strong - 2 receptions, 61 yards, 1 TD
- ILL - Ken Dilger - 5 receptions, 46 yards, 1 TD

=== Michigan State ===
Ohio State Buckeyes at Michigan State Spartans

| Quarter | 1 | 2 | 3 | 4 | Total |
|---|---|---|---|---|---|
| Ohio State | 0 | 3 | 7 | 13 | 23 |
| Michigan State | 0 | 7 | 0 | 0 | 7 |

at Spartan Stadium, East Lansing, Michigan

- Date: October 15, 1994
- Game time: 12:00 p.m. EST
- Game weather: Sunny, 65 °F (18 °C); wind 10-15 mph
- Game attendance: 74,585
- Referee: Jim Kemerling

Game information

Second quarter

- MSU - Duane Goulbourne 2-yard run (Gardner kick)
- OSU - Josh Jackson 33-yard field goal

Third quarter

- OSU - Eddie George 76-yd run (Josh Jackson kick)

Fourth quarter

- OSU - Bobby Hoying 10-yd run (kick blocked)
- OSU - Greg Bellisari 35-yd interception return (Josh Jackson kick)

Top passers

- MSU - Banks- 18/29, 198 yards, 1 INT
- OSU - Bobby Hoying - 9/19, 99 yards, 1 INT

Top receivers

- MSU - Coleman - 7 receptions, 109 yards
- OSU - Chris Sanders 4 receptions, 30 yards

Top rushers

- OSU - Eddie George - 29 rushes, 219 yards, 1 TD
- MSU - Goulbourne - 17 rushes, 57 yards, 1 TD

=== Purdue ===
Purdue Boilermakers at Ohio State Buckeyes

| Quarter | 1 | 2 | 3 | 4 | Total |
|---|---|---|---|---|---|
| Purdue | 0 | 0 | 7 | 7 | 14 |
| Ohio State | 14 | 27 | 7 | 0 | 48 |

at Ohio Stadium, Columbus, Ohio

- Date: October 22, 1994
- Game time: 12:30 p.m. EST
- Game weather: Mostly Sunny, 65 °F (18 °C), Wind 5-10 SSW
- Game attendance: 92,865
- Referee: Ron Winter

Game information

First quarter

- OSU – Chris Sanders 41-yard pass from Bobby Hoying (Josh Jackson kick)
- OSU – Joey Galloway 42-yard pass from Bobby Hoying (Josh Jackson kick)

Second quarter

- OSU – Joey Galloway 2-yard pass from Bobby Hoying (Josh Jackson kick)
- OSU - Pepe Pearson 3-yard run (Josh Jackson kick)
- OSU – Joey Galloway 11-yard pass from Bobby Hoying (Josh Jackson kick)
- OSU - Josh Jackson 29-yard field goal
- OSU - Josh Jackson 38-yard field goal

Third quarter

- OSU - Chris Sanders 14-yard pass from Bobby Hoying (Josh Jackson kick)
- PUR - Craig Allen 90-yard pass from Rick Trefzger (Brad Bobich kick)

Fourth quarter

- PUR - Craig Allen 12-yard pass from Rick Trefzger (Brad Bobich kick)

Top passers

- OSU – Bobby Hoying – 20/24, 304 yards, 5 TDs
- PUR - Rick Trefzger - 10/19, 157 yards, 1 TD, 2 INTs

Top rushers

- PUR - Mike Alstott - 13 rushes, 77 yards
- OSU – Eddie George – 10 rushes, 57 yards

Top receivers

- PUR - Craig Allen - 3 receptions, 108 yards, 2 TDs
- OSU – Joey Galloway – 7 receptions, 95 yards, 3 TDs

=== Penn State ===
Ohio State Buckeyes at Penn State Nittany Lions

| Quarter | 1 | 2 | 3 | 4 | Total |
|---|---|---|---|---|---|
| Ohio State | 0 | 0 | 6 | 8 | 14 |
| Penn State | 7 | 28 | 14 | 14 | 63 |

at Beaver Stadium, State College, Pennsylvania

- Date: October 29, 1994
- Game time: 3:30 p.m.
- Game weather: PClear, 66 °F (19 °C); wind 10-15 SW
- Game attendance: 97,079
- Referee: Dick Honig

Game information

First quarter

- PSU - Ki-Jana Carter 20-yard run (Brett Conway kick)

Second quarter

- PSU - Ki-Jana Carter 1-yard run (Brett Conway kick)
- PSU - Bobby Engram 15-yard pass from Kerry Collins (Brett Conway kick)
- PSU - Ki-Jana Carter 36-yard run (Brett Conway kick)
- PSU - Mike Archie 15-yard pass from Kerry Collins (Brett Conway kick)

Third quarter

- OSU - Chris Sanders 14-yard pass from Bobby Hoying (kick failed)
- PSU - Mike Archie 17-yard run (Brett Conway kick)
- PSU - Ki-Jana Carter 12-yard run (Brett Conway kick)

Fourth quarter

- PSU - Chris Mazyck 10-yard interception return (Brett Conway kick)
- PSU - Ambrose Fletcher 4-yard run (Michael Barninger kick)
- OSU - Stanley Jackson 6-yard run (pass to Rickey Dudley from Stanley Jackson good)

Top passers

- PSU - Kerry Collins - 19/23, 265 yds, 2 TDs
- OSU - Bobby Hoying - 12/24, 87 yds, 1 TD, 3 INTs

Top receivers

- PSU - Freddie Scott - 5 receptions, 80 yards
- OSU - Chris Sanders 4 receptions, 32 yards, 1 TD

Top rushers

- PSU - Ki-Jana Carter - 19 rushes, 137 yards, 4 TDs
- OSU - Pepe Pearson - 9 rushes, 57 yards

=== Wisconsin ===
Wisconsin Badgers at Ohio State Buckeyes

| Quarter | 1 | 2 | 3 | 4 | Total |
|---|---|---|---|---|---|
| Wisconsin | 0 | 3 | 0 | 0 | 3 |
| Ohio State | 3 | 7 | 7 | 7 | 24 |

at Ohio Stadium, Columbus, Ohio

- Date: November 5, 1994
- Game time: 3:30 p.m. EST
- Game weather: Overcast, 71 °F (22 °C)
- Game attendance: 93,340
- Referee: Jim Kemerling
- TV: ABC

Game information

First quarter

- OSU – Josh Jackson 25-yard field goal

Second quarter

- WIS - John Hall 46-yard field goal
- OSU - Chris Sanders 78-yard pass from Bobby Hoying (Josh Jackson kick)

Third quarter

- OSU - Chris Sanders 15-yard pass from Bobby Hoying (Josh Jackson kick)

Fourth quarter

- OSU – Eddie George 1-yard run (Josh Jackson kick)

Top passers

- OSU – Bobby Hoying – 14/28, 207 yards, 2 TDs, 1 INT
- WIS - Macias - 6/11, 80 yards, 1 INT

Top rushers

- OSU – Eddie George – 22 rushes, 104 yards, 1 TD
- OSU - Pepe Pearson - 12 rushes, 57 yards

Top receivers

- OSU – Chris Sanders – 4 receptions, 107 yards, 2 TDs
- OSU - D.J. Jones - 4 receptions, 47 yards

=== Indiana ===
Ohio State Buckeyes at Indiana Hoosiers

| Quarter | 1 | 2 | 3 | 4 | Total |
|---|---|---|---|---|---|
| Ohio State | 12 | 7 | 0 | 13 | 32 |
| Indiana | 7 | 10 | 0 | 0 | 17 |

at Memorial Stadium, Bloomington, Indiana

- Date: November 12, 1994
- Game time: 12:00 p.m. EST
- Game weather: Mostly Sunny, 62 °F (17 °C); wind 8-10 SE
- Game attendance: 44,672

Game information

First quarter

- IND - Ajamu Stoner 13-yd pass from Chris Dittoe (Bill Manolopoulos kick)
- OSU - Joey Galloway 93-yd kickoff return (kick failed)
- OSU - Eddie George 1-yd run (pass failed)

Second quarter

- IND - Bill Manolopoulos 35-yd field goal
- OSU - Eddie George 3-yd run (Josh Jackson kick)
- IND - Chris Dittoe 1-yd run (Bill Manolopoulos kick)

Fourth quarter

- OSU - Rickey Dudley 2-yd pass from Bobby Hoying (kick blocked)
- OSU - Chris Sanders 20-yd pass from Bobby Hoying (Josh Jackson kick)

Top passers

- IND - Dittoe - 20/35, 182 yds, 1 TD, 1 INT
- OSU - Bobby Hoying - 13/23, 166 yds, 2 TDs, 1 INT

Top receivers

- OSU - Joey Galloway - 4 receptions, 69 yards
- IND - Baety, 7 receptions, 66 yards
- IND - Stoner, 5 receptions, 66 yards

Top rushers

- OSU - Eddie George - 26 rushes, 118 yards, 2 TDs
- IND - Smith - 22 rushes, 98 yards

=== Michigan ===
#15 Michigan Wolverines at #22 Ohio State Buckeyes

| Quarter | 1 | 2 | 3 | 4 | Total |
|---|---|---|---|---|---|
| Michigan | 0 | 3 | 3 | 0 | 6 |
| Ohio State | 2 | 10 | 0 | 10 | 22 |

at Ohio Stadium, Columbus, Ohio

- Date: November 19, 1994
- Game time: 12:00 p.m. EST
- Game weather: Clear, 60 °F (16 °C)
- Game attendance: 93,869
- Referee: Ron Winter
- TV announcers (ABC): Brent Musburger

Game information

First quarter

- OSU – Safety, Todd Collins downed in end zone, 3:30. Ohio St 2–0.

Second quarter

- OSU – Bobby Hoying 4-yard run (Josh Jackson kick), 14:11. Ohio St 9–0. Drive: 10 plays, 40 yards, 4:14.
- OSU – Josh Jackson 26-yard field goal, 6:22. Ohio St 12–0. Drive: 14 plays, 64 yards, 6:12.
- MICH – Remy Hamilton 22-yard field goal, 3:52. Ohio St 12–3. Drive: 5 plays, 70 yards, 2:24.

Third quarter

- MICH – Remy Hamilton 22-yard field goal, 7:55. Ohio St 12–6. Drive: 11 plays, 65 yards, 5:28.

Fourth quarter

- OSU – Josh Jackson 36-yard field goal, 11:22. Ohio St 15–6. Drive: 7 plays, 29 yards, 3:15.
- OSU – Eddie George 2-yard run (Josh Jackson kick), 8:35. Ohio St 22–6. Drive: 5 plays, 16 yards, 2:35.

Top passers

- MICH – Todd Collins – 13/22, 160 yards, INT
- OSU – Bobby Hoying – 11/18, 125 yards

Top rushers

- MICH – Tyrone Wheatley – 18 rushes, 92 yards
- OSU – Eddie George – 27 rushes, 71 yards, TD

Top receivers

- MICH – Amani Toomer – 3 receptions, 95 yards
- OSU – Joey Galloway – 4 receptions, 46 yards

=== Vs. Alabama (Citrus Bowl) ===
#6 Alabama Crimson Tide vs. #13 Ohio State Buckeyes

| Quarter | 1 | 2 | 3 | 4 | Total |
|---|---|---|---|---|---|
| Alabama | 0 | 14 | 0 | 10 | 24 |
| Ohio State | 0 | 14 | 0 | 3 | 17 |

at Citrus Bowl, Orlando, Florida

- Date: January 2, 1995
- Game time: 12:00 p.m. EST
- Game weather: Partly Sunny, 70 °F (21 °C), Wind N 10 mph
- Game attendance: 71,195
- TV: ABC

Game information
First quarter
- No scoring

Second quarter

- ALA - Tarrant Lynch 9 yd run (Michael Proctor kick)
- OSU - Joey Galloway 69 yd pass from (Bob Hoying Josh Jackson kick)
- OSU - Joey Galloway 11 yd pass from (Bob Hoying Josh Jackson kick)
- ALA - Sherman Williams 7 yd run (Michael Proctor kick)

Third quarter

- No scoring

Fourth quarter

- OSU - Josh Jackson 34 yd field goal
- ALA - Michael Proctor 27 yd field goal
- ALA - Sherman Williams 50 yd pass from Jay Barker (Michael Proctor kick)

== Personnel ==
=== Coaching staff ===
- John Cooper, head coach (7th year)
- Bill Conley, defensive ends, recruiting coordinator (8th year)
- Larry Coker, defensive backs (2nd year)
- Joe Hollis, offensive coordinator (4th year)
- Ron Hudson, quarterbacks (7th year)
- Lee Owens, offensive line/tight ends (3rd year)
- Fred Pagac, linebackers (13th year)
- Tim Spencer, running backs (1st year)
- Mike Stock, wide receivers (3rd year)
- Bill Young, defensive coordinator (7th year)

=== Roster ===
1994 Ohio State Buckeyes football team roster
Players
Coaches
Offense

| Pos. | # | Name | Class |
|---|---|---|---|
| WR | 1 | DeWayne Carter | Sr |
| G | 57 | LeShun Daniels | Jr |
| TE | 80 | Rickey Dudley | Jr |
| WR | 7 | Joey Galloway | Sr |
| WR | 83 | Terry Glenn | Jr |
| RB | 27 | Eddie George | Jr |
| QB | 14 | Bobby Hoying | Jr |
| QB | 11 | Mark Zban | So |
| QB | 8 | Stanley Jackson | So |
| OT | 75 | Orlando Pace | Fr |
| RB | 29 | Pepe Pearson | Fr |
| WR | 17 | Chris Sanders | Sr |
| RB | 3 | Dimitrious Stanley | So |
| OT | 78 | Korey Stringer | Jr |
| WR | 12 | Buster Tillman | So |

Defense

| Pos. | # | Name | Class |
|---|---|---|---|
| DE | 95 | Jim Bell | So |
| LB | 30 | Greg Bellisari | So |
| NT | 99 | Luke Fickell | Jr |
| LB | 92 | Matt Finkes | So |
| CB | 2 | Ty Howard | Jr |
| S | 34 | Rob Kelly | Jr |
| CB | 46 | Marlon Kerner | Sr |
| CB | 9 | Tito Paul | Sr |
| LB | 84 | Craig Powell | Sr |
| CB | 24 | Shawn Springs | Jr |
| LB | 90 | Lorenzo Styles | Jr |
| LB | 94 | Mike Vrabel | So |

Special teams

| Pos. | # | Name | Class |
|---|---|---|---|
| K | 9 | Josh Jackson | So |
| P | 23 | Scott Terna | Sr |

Head coach

- John Cooper

Coordinators/assistant coaches

Legend

- (C) Team captain
- (S) Suspended
- (I) Ineligible
- Injured
- Redshirt

Roster

== Awards and honors ==
- Orlando Pace, Big Ten Freshman of the Year

== 1995 NFL draftees ==
| Player | Round | Pick | Position | NFL club |
|---|---|---|---|---|
| Joey Galloway | 1 | 8 | Wide receiver | Seattle Seahawks |
| Korey Stringer | 1 | 24 | Tackle | Minnesota Vikings |
| Craig Powell | 1 | 30 | Linebacker | Cleveland Browns |
| Chris Sanders | 3 | 67 | Wide receiver | Houston Oilers |
| Marlon Kerner | 3 | 76 | Defensive back | Buffalo Bills |
| Lorenzo Styles | 3 | 77 | Linebacker | Atlanta Falcons |
| Preston Harrison | 3 | 98 | Linebacker | San Diego Chargers |
| Tito Paul | 5 | 167 | Defensive back | Arizona Cardinals |
