= 1994 Minnesota Golden Gophers football team =

American college football season

1994 Minnesota Golden Gophers football
- Conference: Big Ten Conference
- Record: 3–8 (1–7 Big Ten)
- Head coach: Jim Wacker (3rd season)
- Offensive coordinator: Bob DeBesse (3rd season)
- Defensive coordinator: Marc Dove (3rd season)
- Captains: Chris Darkins; Ed Hawthorne
- Home stadium: Hubert H. Humphrey Metrodome

1994 Big Ten Conference football standings
	Conf.					Overall
Team	W		L		T	W		L		T
No. 2 Penn State $	8	–	0	–	0	12	–	0	–	0
No. 14 Ohio State	6	–	2	–	0	9	–	4	–	0
Wisconsin	5	–	2	–	1	8	–	3	–	1
No. 12 Michigan	5	–	3	–	0	8	–	4	–	0
Illinois	4	–	4	–	0	7	–	5	–	0
Purdue	3	–	3	–	2	5	–	4	–	2
Iowa	3	–	4	–	1	5	–	5	–	1
Indiana	3	–	5	–	0	6	–	5	–	0
Northwestern	3	–	5	–	0	4	–	6	–	1
Minnesota	1	–	7	–	0	3	–	8	–	0
Michigan State †	0	–	8	–	0	0	–	11	–	0
$ – Conference champion; † Michigan State forfeited 5 wins including 4 conference victories, over Wisconsin, Indiana, Northwestern, and Purdue.; Rankings from AP Poll

The 1994 Minnesota Golden Gophers football team represented the University of Minnesota as a member of the Big Ten Conference during the 1994 NCAA Division I-A football season. In their third year under head coach Jim Wacker, the Golden Gophers compiled am overall record of 3–8 with a mark of 1–7 in conference play, placing last out of 11 teams in the Big Ten, and were outscored 348 to 256.

Defensive tackle Ed Hawthorne and linebacker Broderick Hall were named All-Big Ten first team. Kicker Mike Chalberg was named All-Big Ten second team. Defensive back Justin Conzemius was named first team Academic All-American. Kicker Mike Chalberg, defensive back Justin Conzemius, offensive lineman Chris Fowlkes, offensive lineman Luke Glime, linebacker Luke Hiestand, offensive lineman Todd Jesewitz, linebacker Ben Langford, wide receiver Tony Levine, defensive back Dan LiSanti, linebacker Craig Sauer, quarterback Cory Sauter and linebacker Chris Smith were named Academic All-Big Ten.

Chris Darkins was awarded the Bronko Nagurski Award and Bruce Smith Award. Craig Sauer was awarded the Carl Eller Award. Free safety Rishon Early was awarded the Bobby Bell Award. Justin Conzemius was awarded the Butch Nash Award. Ed Hawthorne was awarded the Paul Giel Award.

The total attendance for the season was 253,851, which averaged to 42,308 per game. The season attendance high was against Iowa, with 53,340 in attendance.

== Schedule ==
Date	Time	Opponent	Site	TV	Result	Attendance
September 3	7:00 pm	No. 9 Penn State	Hubert H. Humphrey Metrodome; Minneapolis, MN (Governor's Victory Bell)		L 3–56	51,134
September 10	7:00 pm	Pacific (CA)*	Hubert H. Humphrey Metrodome; Minneapolis, MN		W 33–7	37,719
September 17	6:00 pm	San Diego State*	Hubert H. Humphrey Metrodome; Minneapolis, MN		W 40–17	32,212
September 24	1:10 pm	at Kansas State*	KSU Stadium; Manhattan, KS	MSC	L 0–35	40,002
October 1	1:00 pm	at Indiana	Memorial Stadium; Bloomington, IN		L 14–25	38,195
October 8	1:00 pm	at Purdue	Ross–Ade Stadium; West Lafayette, IN		L 37–49	33,158
October 15	6:00 pm	Northwestern^{†}	Hubert H. Humphrey Metrodome; Minneapolis, MN		L 31–37	44,377
October 22	1:00 pm	at Wisconsin	Camp Randall Stadium; Madison, WI (rivalry)		W 17–14	77,745
November 5	6:00 pm	Illinois	Hubert H. Humphrey Metrodome; Minneapolis, Minneapolis, MN		L 17–21	35,069
November 12	12:00 pm	at No. 19 Michigan	Michigan Stadium; Ann Arbor, MI (Little Brown Jug)		L 22–38	105,624
November 19	6:00 pm	Iowa	Hubert H. Humphrey Metrodome; Minneapolis, MN (rivalry)		L 42–49	53,340
*Non-conference game; ^{†}Homecoming; Rankings from AP Poll released prior to the game; All times are in Central time

== Game summaries ==
=== Iowa ===
Iowa at Minnesota

Team	1	2	3	4	Total
• Hawkeyes	14	14	21	0	49
Golden Gophers	10	7	15	10	42

- Date: November 19
- Location: Hubert H. Humphrey Metrodome, Minneapolis, Minnesota
- Game attendance: 53,340
- Sources: Box score and Game recap

Scoring summary
1	Iowa	Odems 3-yard fumble recovery on punt (Brion Hurley kick)	Iowa 7–0
1	Minn	Darkins 56-yard run (Chalberg kick)	Tied 7–7
1	Iowa	Tavian Banks 25-yard run (Brion Hurley kick)	Iowa 14–7
1	Minn	Chalbert 32-yard field goal	Iowa 14–10
2	Minn	Rios 8-yard pass from Schade (Chalberg kick)	Minn 17–14
2	Iowa	Sedrick Shaw 46-yard pass from Sherman (Brion Hurley kick)	Iowa 21–17
2	Iowa	Sedrick Shaw 17-yard run (Brion Hurley kick)	Iowa 28–17
3	Minn	Darkins 1-yard run (Schade pass to Atwell)	Iowa 28–25
3	Minn	Osterman 80-yard pass from Schade (Chalberg kick)	Minn 32–28
3	Iowa	Odems 34-yard pass from Sherman (Brion Hurley kick)	Iowa 35–32
3	Iowa	Sherman 9-yard pass from Tim Dwight (Brion Hurley kick)	Iowa 42–32
3	Iowa	Porter 10-yard fumble return (Brion Hurley kick)	Iowa 49–32
4	Minn	Darkins 3-yard run (Chalberg kick)	Iowa 49–39
4	Minn	Chalberg 28-yard field goal	Iowa 49–42

== Roster ==
1994 Minnesota Golden Gophers football team roster
Players
Coaches
Offense

Pos.	#	Name	Class
RB	5	Rafael Cooper	Fr
RB	44	Chris Darkins	Jr
QB	17	Cory Sauter	Fr
QB		Tim Schade
WR	4	Ryan Thelwell	Fr
WR	19	Alan Slavik	So

Defense

Pos.	#	Name	Class
DT	90	Ed Hawthorne	Sr
CB	24	Rodney Heath	So
LB	16	Craig Sauer	Jr

Special teams

Pos.	#	Name	Class

Head coach

- Jim Wacker

Coordinators/assistant coaches

Legend

- (C) Team captain
- (S) Suspended
- (I) Ineligible
- Injured
- Redshirt
