= 1994 Indiana Hoosiers football team =

American college football season

1994 Indiana Hoosiers football
- Conference: Big Ten Conference
- Record: 6–5 (3–5 Big Ten)
- Head coach: Bill Mallory (11th season)
- Defensive coordinator: Joe Novak (11th season)
- MVP: Alfonzo Thurman
- Captains: Troy Drake; Alfonzo Thurman
- Home stadium: Memorial Stadium

1994 Big Ten Conference football standings
	Conf.					Overall
Team	W		L		T	W		L		T
No. 2 Penn State $	8	–	0	–	0	12	–	0	–	0
No. 14 Ohio State	6	–	2	–	0	9	–	4	–	0
Wisconsin	5	–	2	–	1	8	–	3	–	1
No. 12 Michigan	5	–	3	–	0	8	–	4	–	0
Illinois	4	–	4	–	0	7	–	5	–	0
Purdue	3	–	3	–	2	5	–	4	–	2
Iowa	3	–	4	–	1	5	–	5	–	1
Indiana	3	–	5	–	0	6	–	5	–	0
Northwestern	3	–	5	–	0	4	–	6	–	1
Minnesota	1	–	7	–	0	3	–	8	–	0
Michigan State †	0	–	8	–	0	0	–	11	–	0
$ – Conference champion; † Michigan State forfeited 5 wins including 4 conference victories, over Wisconsin, Indiana, Northwestern, and Purdue.; Rankings from AP Poll

The 1994 Indiana Hoosiers football team represented Indiana University Bloomington as a member of the Big Ten Conference during the 1994 NCAA Division I-A football season. Led by 11th-year head coach Bill Mallory, the Hoosiers finished the season with an overall record of 6–5 and a mark of 3–5 in conference play, tying for ninth place in the Big Ten. The team played home games at Memorial Stadium in Bloomington, Indiana.

After the season, Indiana's record was retroactively adjusted to 7–4 following NCAA violations incurred by Michigan State.

== Schedule ==
Date	Time	Opponent	Rank	Site	TV	Result	Attendance	Source
September 3	12:30 pm	Cincinnati*		Memorial Stadium; Bloomington, IN	ESPN	W 28–3	31,284	
September 10	2:00 pm	Miami (OH)*		Memorial Stadium; Bloomington, IN		W 35–14	33,489	
September 17	7:00 pm	at Kentucky*		Commonwealth Stadium; Lexington, KY (rivalry)		W 59–29	57,825	
September 24	12:30 pm	at No. 16 Wisconsin	No. 25	Camp Randall Stadium; Madison, WI	ESPN	L 13–62	77,745	
October 1	2:00 pm	Minnesota		Memorial Stadium; Bloomington, IN		W 25–14	38,195	
October 8	2:05 pm	at Iowa		Kinnick Stadium; Iowa City, IA		W 27–20	67,138	
October 22	2:00 pm	Northwestern^{†}		Memorial Stadium; Bloomington, IN		L 7–20	39,208	
October 29	1:00 pm	at Michigan State		Spartan Stadium; East Lansing, MI (rivalry)		L 21–27	60,773	
November 5	12:30 pm	No. 2 Penn State		Memorial Stadium; Bloomington, IN	ESPN	L 29–35	47,754	
November 12	12:30 pm	Ohio State		Memorial Stadium; Bloomington, IN	ESPN	L 17–32	44,672	
November 19	1:00 pm	at Purdue		Ross–Ade Stadium; West Lafayette, IN (Old Oaken Bucket)		W 33–29	60,967–62,839	
*Non-conference game; ^{†}Homecoming; Rankings from AP Poll released prior to the game; All times are in Eastern time

== 1995 NFL draftees ==
Player	Round	Pick	Position	NFL team
Andrew Greene	2	53	Guard	Miami Dolphins
Lance Brown	5	161	Safety	Pittsburgh Steelers
