= 1994 Purdue Boilermakers football team =

American college football season

1994 Purdue Boilermakers football
- Conference: Big Ten Conference
- Record: 5–4–2 (3–3–2 Big Ten)
- Head coach: Jim Colletto (4th season)
- Offensive coordinator: Bobby Turner (4th season)
- Defensive coordinator: Bob Morris (1st season)
- MVP: Mike Alstott
- Captains: Mike Alstott; Ryan Grigson; Matt Kingsbury
- Home stadium: Ross–Ade Stadium

1994 Big Ten Conference football standings
	Conf.					Overall
Team	W		L		T	W		L		T
No. 2 Penn State $	8	–	0	–	0	12	–	0	–	0
No. 14 Ohio State	6	–	2	–	0	9	–	4	–	0
Wisconsin	5	–	2	–	1	8	–	3	–	1
No. 12 Michigan	5	–	3	–	0	8	–	4	–	0
Illinois	4	–	4	–	0	7	–	5	–	0
Purdue	3	–	3	–	2	5	–	4	–	2
Iowa	3	–	4	–	1	5	–	5	–	1
Indiana	3	–	5	–	0	6	–	5	–	0
Northwestern	3	–	5	–	0	4	–	6	–	1
Minnesota	1	–	7	–	0	3	–	8	–	0
Michigan State †	0	–	8	–	0	0	–	11	–	0
$ – Conference champion; † Michigan State forfeited 5 wins including 4 conference victories, over Wisconsin, Indiana, Northwestern, and Purdue.; Rankings from AP Poll

The 1994 Purdue Boilermakers football team represented Purdue University as a member of the Big Ten Conference during the 1994 NCAA Division I-A football season. Led by fourth-year head coach Jim Colletto, the Boilermakers finished the season with an overall record of 4–5–2 and a mark of 2–4–2 in conference play, tying for eighth place the Big Ten. Michigan State later forfeited all five of its victories, including their win over the Boilermakers, improving Purdue's record to 5–4–2 overall, 3–3–2 in conference play, and a tie for fifth place in the Big Ten standings. With the forfeit win, Purdue snapped a streak of nine consecutive losing seasons. The team played home games at Ross–Ade Stadium in West Lafayette, Indiana.

== Schedule ==
Date	Time	Opponent	Site	TV	Result	Attendance	Source
September 10	6:00 pm	Toledo*	Ross–Ade Stadium; West Lafayette, IN		W 51–17	48,962	
September 17	1:00 pm	Ball State*	Ross–Ade Stadium; West Lafayette, IN		W 49–21	45,772	
September 24	1:30 pm	at No. 8 Notre Dame*	Notre Dame Stadium; Notre Dame, IN (rivalry)	NBC	L 21–39	59,075	
October 1	1:00 pm	at No. 25 Illinois	Memorial Stadium; Champaign, IL (rivalry)		W 22–16	58,338	
October 8	1:00 pm	Minnesota	Ross–Ade Stadium; West Lafayette, IN		W 49–37	32,622	
October 15	1:00 pm	at No. 23 Wisconsin	Camp Randall Stadium; Madison, WI		T 27–27	77,745	
October 22	11:30 am	at No. 24 Ohio State	Ohio Stadium; Columbus, OH	ESPN	L 14–48	92,865	
October 29	1:00 pm	Iowa^{†}	Ross–Ade Stadium; West Lafayette, IN		T 21–21	42,965	
November 5	1:00 pm	No. 20 Michigan	Ross–Ade Stadium; West Lafayette, IN		L 23–45	41,224	
November 12	1:00 pm	at Michigan State	Spartan Stadium; East Lansing, MI		W 30–42 (forfeit win)	60,164	
November 19	1:00 pm	Indiana	Ross–Ade Stadium; West Lafayette, IN (Old Oaken Bucket)		L 29–33	60,967–62,839	
*Non-conference game; ^{†}Homecoming; Rankings from AP Poll released prior to the game; All times are in Eastern time

== Game summaries ==
=== Toledo ===
- Corey Rogers 18 rushes, 129 yards

=== Ball State ===
- Mike Alstott 19 rushes, 156 yards
- Corey Rogers 13 rushes, 124 yards

=== Iowa ===
- Mike Alstott 25 rushes, 138 yards

== Roster ==
1994 Purdue Boilermakers football team roster
Players
Coaches
Offense

Pos.	#	Name	Class
WR		Brian Alford
WR		Craig Allen
FB		Mike Alstott	Jr
FB	47	Mike Anderson	Sr
TE		Jon Blackman
OL		Mike Cardona
QB		Billy Dicken
QB		Brian Goehl
OL		Ryan Grigson
OL		Alfie Hill
OL		Damon Lewis
RB		Kendall Matthews
WR		Kirk Olivadotti
RB		Corey Rogers
WR		Terry Samuel
OL		Chris Sedoris
TE		Charlie Stephens
WR		Burt Thornton
WR		Willie Tillman	Fr
QB		Rick Trefzger
RB		Edwin Watson
OL		Emmett Zitelli

Defense

Pos.	#	Name	Class
DB		Derrick Brown
DB		Lee Brush
DL		Mike Burchfield
LB		Bart Conley
DB		Joe Hagins
LB		Aaron Hall
DL		Darnel Howard
DB		John Jackson
DB		Reggie Johnson
DL		Matt Kingsbury
DL		Jon Krick
DL		Ben Metzger
LB		Chike Okeafor
DL		Jayme Washel

Special teams

Pos.	#	Name	Class
K		Brad Bobich
P		Rob Deignan
KR		Curtis Taylor

Head coach

- Jim Colletto

Coordinators/assistant coaches

- Chester Caddas
- Randy Fichtner
  (Wide receivers)
- Tim Salem
  (Quarterbacks)

Legend

- (C) Team captain
- (S) Suspended
- (I) Ineligible
- Injured
- Redshirt
