= 1994 Northwestern Wildcats football team =

American college football season

1994 Northwestern Wildcats football
- Conference: Big Ten Conference
- Record: 3–7–1 (2–6 Big Ten)
- Head coach: Gary Barnett (3rd season)
- Offensive coordinator: Greg Meyer (3rd season)
- Defensive coordinator: Ron Vanderlinden (3rd season)
- Captains: Hugh Williams; Bill Koziel; Michael Senters; Korey Singleton
- Home stadium: Dyche Stadium

1994 Big Ten Conference football standings
	Conf.					Overall
Team	W		L		T	W		L		T
No. 2 Penn State $	8	–	0	–	0	12	–	0	–	0
No. 14 Ohio State	6	–	2	–	0	9	–	4	–	0
Wisconsin	5	–	2	–	1	8	–	3	–	1
No. 12 Michigan	5	–	3	–	0	8	–	4	–	0
Illinois	4	–	4	–	0	7	–	5	–	0
Purdue	3	–	3	–	2	5	–	4	–	2
Iowa	3	–	4	–	1	5	–	5	–	1
Indiana	3	–	5	–	0	6	–	5	–	0
Northwestern	3	–	5	–	0	4	–	6	–	1
Minnesota	1	–	7	–	0	3	–	8	–	0
Michigan State †	0	–	8	–	0	0	–	11	–	0
$ – Conference champion; † Michigan State forfeited 5 wins including 4 conference victories, over Wisconsin, Indiana, Northwestern, and Purdue.; Rankings from AP Poll

The 1994 Northwestern Wildcats team represented Northwestern University during the 1994 NCAA Division I-A football season. In their third year under head coach Gary Barnett, the Wildcats compiled a 3–7–1 record (2–6 against Big Ten Conference opponents) and finished in eighth place in the Big Ten Conference.

The team's offensive leaders were quarterback Steve Schnur with 899 passing yards, Dennis Lundy with 1,189 rushing yards, and Mike Senters with 385 receiving yards. Paul Burton was selected by the Associated Press as the first-team punter on the 1994 All-Big Ten Conference football team.

== Schedule ==
Date	Opponent	Site	TV	Result	Attendance
September 3	vs. No. 3 Notre Dame*	Soldier Field; Chicago, IL (rivalry)	ABC	L 15–42	66,946
September 10	No. 24 Stanford*	Dyche Stadium; Evanston, IL	ESPN	T 41–41	27,436
September 17	at Air Force*	Falcon Stadium; Colorado Springs, CO		W 14–10	
October 1	No. 20 Ohio State	Dyche Stadium; Evanston, IL		L 15–17	34,753
October 8	No. 24 Wisconsin	Dyche Stadium; Evanston, IL		L 14–46	46,437
October 15	at Minnesota	Hubert H. Humphrey Metrodome; Minneapolis, MN		W 37–31	44,377
October 22	at Indiana	Memorial Stadium; Bloomington, IN		W 20–7	39,208
October 29	Illinois	Dyche Stadium; Evanston, IL (rivalry)		L 7–28	40,365
November 5	Michigan State	Dyche Stadium; Evanston, IL		L 17–35	47,754
November 12	at Iowa	Kinnick Stadium; Iowa City, IA		L 13–49	66,532
November 19	at No. 2 Penn State	Beaver Stadium; University Park, PA		L 17–45	96,383
*Non-conference game; Rankings from AP Poll released prior to the game

== Roster ==
1994 Northwestern Wildcats football team roster
Players
Coaches
Offense

Pos.	#	Name	Class
QB	9	Lloyd Abramson	Fr
RB	32	Adrian Autry	Fr
RB	24	Darnell Autry	So
OT	76	Todd Baczek	Sr
QB	12	D'Wayne Bates	Fr
WR	86	Dave Beazley	Jr
TE	81	Jon Burns	So
OT	61	Justin Chabot	Jr
TE	83	Darren Drexler	Jr
WR	1	Chris Gamble	Sr
TE	84	Shane Graham	Jr
QB	17	Chris Hamdorf	So
FB	46	Matt Hartl	Fr
QB	6	Tim Hughes	So
RB	42	Bobby Jackson	Sr
OT	74	Paul Janus	So
C	57	Rob Johnson	Sr
OT	78	Brian Kardos	Jr
RB	40	Chad Lilly	Sr
RB	34	Dennis Lundy	Sr
TE	87	Luther Morris	Sr
WR	22	Brian Musso	So
G	70	Matt O'Dwyer	Sr
G	75	Ryan Padgett	Sr
G	65	Todd Pawlowski	Sr
G	77	Chad Pugh	Jr
C	62	Adam Reed	Fr
QB	10	Steve Schnur	So
WR	7	Mike Senters	Sr
C	63	Nathan Strikwerda	So
WR	18	Toussaint Waterman	So
QB, WR	8	Glenn Winship	Jr

Defense

Pos.	#	Name	Class
FS	20	William Bennett	Jr
CB	5	Dwight Brown	Sr
SS	33	Eric Collier	So
DT	89	Larry Curry	Jr
DE	36	Casey Dailey	So
LB	51	Pat Fitzgerald	So
DT	64	Brian Harpring	Sr
LB	53	Don Holmes	Fr
CB	3	Hudhaifa Ismaeli	So
DT	58	Bill Koziel	Sr
LB	44	Keith Lozowski	So
CB	16	Chris Martin	Jr
LB	45	Mike McGrew	Jr
CB	15	Rodney Ray	Sr
DT	95	Matt Rice	So
DT	94	Joe Reiff	Jr
DL	96	Ray Robey	So
LB	52	Tim Scharf	So
LB	47	Geoff Shein	Sr
SS	38	Korey Singleton	Sr
DT	99	Kyle Smith	Sr
FS	2	Lentwan Smith	So
FS	30	Matt Stewart	So
LB	50	Danny Sutter	Jr
LB	68	Mike Warren	Sr
LB	35	Hugh Williams	Sr
CB	4	B. J. Winfield	Sr
LB	55	Brian Zeeb	Sr

Special teams

Pos.	#	Name	Class
P	14	Paul Burton	Jr
K	13	Brian Gowins	Fr
K	27	Sam Valenzisi	Sr

Head coach

- Gary Barnett

Coordinators/assistant coaches

Legend

- (C) Team captain
- (S) Suspended
- (I) Ineligible
- Injured
- Redshirt

== Team players in the NFL ==
Player	Position	Round	Pick	NFL club
Matt O'Dwyer	Guard	2	33	New York Jets
Michael Senters	Wide Receiver	5	135	Carolina Panthers
