= 1994 Michigan State Spartans football team =

American college football season

1994 Michigan State Spartans football
- Conference: Big Ten Conference
- Record: 0–11, 5 wins forfeited (0–8 Big Ten, 4 wins forfeited)
- Head coach: George Perles (12th season)
- Offensive coordinator: Morris Watts (8th season)
- Defensive coordinator: Norm Parker (7th season)
- MVP: Scott Greene
- Captains: Mark Birchmeier; Mill Coleman; Juan Hammonds
- Home stadium: Spartan Stadium

1994 Big Ten Conference football standings
	Conf.					Overall
Team	W		L		T	W		L		T
No. 2 Penn State $	8	–	0	–	0	12	–	0	–	0
No. 14 Ohio State	6	–	2	–	0	9	–	4	–	0
Wisconsin	5	–	2	–	1	8	–	3	–	1
No. 12 Michigan	5	–	3	–	0	8	–	4	–	0
Illinois	4	–	4	–	0	7	–	5	–	0
Purdue	3	–	3	–	2	5	–	4	–	2
Iowa	3	–	4	–	1	5	–	5	–	1
Indiana	3	–	5	–	0	6	–	5	–	0
Northwestern	3	–	5	–	0	4	–	6	–	1
Minnesota	1	–	7	–	0	3	–	8	–	0
Michigan State †	0	–	8	–	0	0	–	11	–	0
$ – Conference champion; † Michigan State forfeited 5 wins including 4 conference victories, over Wisconsin, Indiana, Northwestern, and Purdue.; Rankings from AP Poll

The 1994 Michigan State Spartans football team competed on behalf of Michigan State University as a member of the Big Ten Conference during the 1994 NCAA Division I-A football season. Led by George Perles in his 12th and final season as head coach, the Spartans finished the season with an overall record of 5–6 and a mark of 4–4 in conference play, tying for fifth place in the Big Ten. Michigan State played home games at Spartan Stadium in East Lansing, Michigan.

Perles was fired on November 8, although he was allowed to coach the remaining games on the schedule. Although the NCAA found no infractions after two investigations requested by Michigan State president Peter M. McPherson, Spartans forfeited their five wins from the 1994 due to a 'lack of institutional control'. As a result, the Spartans' official record for the season dropped 0–11 overall and 0–8 in conference play, placing them last out of 11 teams in Big Ten. With the forfeits, this remains the Spartans' worst record in program history.

== Schedule ==
Date	Time	Opponent	Site	TV	Result	Attendance
September 10	2:00 p.m.	at Kansas*	Memorial Stadium; Lawrence, KS		L 10–17	48,000
September 17	3:30 p.m.	No. 9 Notre Dame*	Spartan Stadium; East Lansing, MI (rivalry)	ABC	L 20–21	74,183
September 24	1:00 p.m.	Miami (OH)*	Spartan Stadium; East Lansing, MI		F 45–10 (forfeit)	61,224
October 1	12:30 p.m.	No. 15 Wisconsin^{†}	Spartan Stadium; East Lansing, MI	ESPN	F 29–10 (forfeit)	71,234
October 8	12:30 p.m.	at No. 7 Michigan	Michigan Stadium; Ann Arbor, MI (rivalry)	ESPN	L 20–40	106,272
October 15	3:30 p.m.	Ohio State	Spartan Stadium; East Lansing, MI	ABC	L 7–23	74,585
October 22	2:00 p.m.	at Iowa	Kinnick Stadium; Iowa City, IA		L 14–19	68,532
October 29	1:00 p.m.	Indiana	Spartan Stadium; East Lansing, MI (rivalry)		F 27–21 (forfeit)	60,773
November 5	2:00 p.m.	at Northwestern	Dyche Stadium; Evanston, IL		F 35–17 (forfeit)	47,754
November 12	1:00 p.m.	Purdue	Spartan Stadium; East Lansing, MI		F 42–30 (forfeit)	60,164
November 26	4:00 p.m.	at No. 2 Penn State	Beaver Stadium; University Park, PA (rivalry)	ESPN	L 31–59	96,493
*Non-conference game; ^{†}Homecoming; Rankings from AP Poll released prior to the game; All times are in Eastern time

== Personnel ==
1994 Michigan State Spartans football team roster
Players
Coaches
Offense

Pos.	#	Name	Class
OT	76	Flozell Adams	Fr
QB	12	Tony Banks	Jr
OT	79	Brian DeMarco	Sr
FB	47	Scott Greene	Jr
OT	63	Shane Hannah	Sr
WR	1	Muhsin Muhammad	Jr

Defense

Pos.	#	Name	Class
LB	22	Reggie Garnett	So
DT	96	Chris Smith	So
DE		Jabbar Threats	So

Special teams

Pos.	#	Name	Class

Head coach

- George Perles

Coordinators/assistant coaches

Legend

- (C) Team captain
- (S) Suspended
- (I) Ineligible
- Injured
- Redshirt

== 1995 NFL draft ==
The following players were selected in the 1995 NFL draft.

Player	Round	Pick	Position	NFL team
Brian DeMarco	2	40	Defensive tackle	Jacksonville Jaguars
Shane Hannah	2	63	Guard	Dallas Cowboys
