= 1994 Michigan Wolverines football team =

American college football season

1994 Michigan Wolverines football

Holiday Bowl champion

Holiday Bowl, W 24–14 vs. Colorado State
- Conference: Big Ten Conference

Ranking
- Coaches: No. 12
- AP: No. 12
- Record: 8–4 (5–3 Big Ten)
- Head coach: Gary Moeller (5th season)
- Defensive coordinator: Lloyd Carr (8th season)
- MVP: Todd Collins
- Captains: Steve Morrison; Walter Smith
- Home stadium: Michigan Stadium

1994 Big Ten Conference football standings
	Conf.					Overall
Team	W		L		T	W		L		T
No. 2 Penn State $	8	–	0	–	0	12	–	0	–	0
No. 14 Ohio State	6	–	2	–	0	9	–	4	–	0
Wisconsin	5	–	2	–	1	8	–	3	–	1
No. 12 Michigan	5	–	3	–	0	8	–	4	–	0
Illinois	4	–	4	–	0	7	–	5	–	0
Purdue	3	–	3	–	2	5	–	4	–	2
Iowa	3	–	4	–	1	5	–	5	–	1
Indiana	3	–	5	–	0	6	–	5	–	0
Northwestern	3	–	5	–	0	4	–	6	–	1
Minnesota	1	–	7	–	0	3	–	8	–	0
Michigan State †	0	–	8	–	0	0	–	11	–	0
$ – Conference champion; † Michigan State forfeited 5 wins including 4 conference victories, over Wisconsin, Indiana, Northwestern, and Purdue.; Rankings from AP Poll

The 1994 Michigan Wolverines football team was an American football team that represented the University of Michigan in the Big Ten Conference during the 1994 NCAA Division I-A football season. In their fifth and final year under head coach Gary Moeller, the Wolverines compiled an 8–4 record (5–3 in conference games), outscored opponents by a total of 306 to 254, and finished fourth in the Big Ten. They defeated Colorado State in the Holiday Bowl and were ranked No. 12 in the final AP Poll.

Quarterback Todd Collins tallied 2,356 passing yards and was selected as the team's most valuable player. The team's other statistical leaders included running back Tyrone Wheatley with 1,064 rushing yards, wide receiver Amani Toomer with 49 receptions for 1,033 yards and 21 touchdowns, and placekicker Remy Hamilton with 101 points scored (23 extra poins, 24 field goals).

Toomer and Hamilton were selected as first-team All-Americans by the Walter Camp Football Foundation. Four Michigan players received first-team honors on the 1994 All-Big Ten Conference football team: wide receiver Amani Toomer; linebacker Steve Morrison; defensive back Ty Law; and placekicker Remy Hamilton.

== Schedule ==
Date	Time	Opponent	Rank	Site	TV	Result	Attendance
September 3	3:30 p.m.	Boston College*	No. 5	Michigan Stadium; Ann Arbor, MI	ABC	W 34–26	105,936
September 10	2:30 p.m.	at No. 3 Notre Dame*	No. 6	Notre Dame Stadium; Notre Dame, IN (rivalry, College GameDay)	NBC	W 26–24	59,075
September 24	3:30 p.m.	No. 7 Colorado*	No. 4	Michigan Stadium; Ann Arbor, MI (Miracle at Michigan)	ABC	L 26–27	106,427
October 1	3:30 p.m.	at Iowa	No. 7	Kinnick Stadium; Iowa City, IA	ABC	W 29–14	70,397
October 8	12:30 p.m.	Michigan State	No. 7	Michigan Stadium; Ann Arbor, MI (rivalry)	ESPN	W 40–20	106,272
October 15	3:30 p.m.	No. 3 Penn State	No. 5	Michigan Stadium; Ann Arbor, MI (rivalry, College GameDay)	ABC	L 24–31	106,832
October 22	3:30 p.m.	at Illinois	No. 11	Memorial Stadium; Champaign, IL (rivalry)	ABC	W 19–14	72,677
October 29	12:00 p.m.	Wisconsin^{†}	No. 10	Michigan Stadium; Ann Arbor, MI	ESPN	L 19–31	106,209
November 5	1:00 p.m.	at Purdue	No. 20	Ross–Ade Stadium; West Lafayette, IN		W 45–23	43,162
November 12	1:00 p.m.	Minnesota	No. 19	Michigan Stadium; Ann Arbor, MI (Little Brown Jug)	MSC	W 38–22	105,624
November 19	12:00 p.m.	at No. 22 Ohio State	No. 15	Ohio Stadium; Columbus, OH (The Game)	ABC	L 6–22	93,869
December 30	8:30 p.m.	vs. No. 10 Colorado State*	No. 20	Jack Murphy Stadium; San Diego, CA (Holiday Bowl)	ESPN	W 24–14	59,453
*Non-conference game; ^{†}Homecoming; Rankings from AP Poll released prior to the game; All times are in Eastern time

== Game summaries ==
=== Boston College ===
Sixteen seconds into the game, the #5 ranked Wolverines found themselves down 7–0 on a Mike Hartsell 74-yard TD pass to Greg Grice. BC stretched it to 12–0, before Michigan began to rally. Ed Davis scored from 4 yards out to cut the lead, then Todd Collins hit Amani Toomer from 54 yards out to give the Wolverines a 14–12 lead at halftime. Collins and Toomer hooked up again in the 3rd quarter to stretch the lead to 21–12, then Davis and Tim Biakabutuka added touchdown runs to give Michigan a 34–12 lead, and the Wolverines held on after BC scored late to make the final 34–26. Collins completed 17 of 24 passes for 258 yards, 2 touchdowns and 1 interception. Toomer caught 7 passes for 179 yards and running back Tim Biakabutuka rushed for 128 yards and a touchdown on 12 carries.

Boston College at Michigan

Team	1	2	3	4	Total
Eagles	9	3	0	14	26
• No. 5 Wolverines	0	14	7	13	34

- Date: September 3
- Location: Michigan Stadium
- Game attendance: 105,936

Scoring summary
Q1	BC	Grice 74 yard pass from Hartsell (Gordon kick)	BC 7–0
Q1	BC	Safety, holding penalty by Michigan in end zone	BC 9–0
Q2	BC	Gordon 28 yard field goal	BC 12–0
Q2	MICH	Davis 8 yard run (Lovell kick)	BC 12–7
Q2	MICH	Toomer 46 yard pass from Collins (Lovell kick)	MICH 14–12
Q3	MICH	Toomer 38 yard pass from Collins (Lovell kick)	MICH 21–12
Q4	MICH	Biakabutuka 1 yard run (kick failed)	MICH 27–12
Q4	MICH	Davis 1 yard run (Hamilton kick)	MICH 34–12
Q4	BC	Laro 4 yard pass from Hartsell (Gordon kick)	MICH 34–19
Q4	BC	Watson 27 yard pass from Hartsell (Gordon kick)	MICH 34–26

=== At Notre Dame ===
Michigan at Notre Dame

Team	1	2	3	4	Total
• No. 6 Wolverines	7	3	10	6	26
No. 3 Fighting Irish	10	0	7	7	24

- Date: September 10
- Location: Notre Dame Stadium, South Bend, Indiana
- Game attendance: 59,075
- Television network: NBC

Scoring summary
Q1		ND	Schroffner 32 yard field goal	ND 3–0
Q1		MICH	Biakabutuka 9 yard run (Hamilton kick)	MICH 7–3
Q1		ND	Becton 1 yard pass from Powlus (Schroffner kick)	ND 10–7
Q2		MICH	Hamilton 32 yard field goal	Tie 10–10
Q3		ND	Edwards 8 yard run (Schroffner kick)	ND 17–10
Q3		MICH	Riemersma 3 yard pass from Collins (Hamilton kick)	Tie 17–17
Q3		MICH	Hamilton 35 yard field goal	MICH 20–17
Q4		MICH	Hamilton 32 yard field goal	MICH 23–17
Q4	:52	ND	Mayes 7 yard pass from Powlus (Schroffner kick)	ND 24–23
Q4	:02	MICH	Hamilton 42 yard field goal	MICH 26–24

In a back and forth game, Remy Hamilton kicked a 42-yard field goal with 2 seconds left to give #6 Michigan a 26–24 victory over #3 Notre Dame at South Bend. Hamilton finished with 4 field goals on the day. Tim Biakabutuka scored from 9 yards out and Jay Riemersma caught a 3-yard TD pass from Todd Collins for Michigan's points. Notre Dame had taken the lead with 52 seconds left, then Collins led the Wolverines into position for Hamilton's winning kick. Biakabutuka finished with 100 yards rushing and Collins completed 21 of 29 passes for 224 yards. "I'm a hero now. I could be a goat next week." -Remy Hamilton

=== Colorado ===
Colorado at Michigan

Team	1	2	3	4	Total
• No. 7 Buffaloes	7	7	0	13	27
No. 4 Wolverines	0	9	17	0	26

- Date: September 24
- Location: Michigan Stadium, Ann Arbor, Michigan
- Game attendance: 106,427
- TV announcers (ABC): Keith Jackson, Bob Griese, and Lynn Swann

Scoring summary
1		COL	Rashaan Salaam 2-yard run (Voskeritchian kick)	COL 7–0
2	11:34	MICH	Remy Hamilton 33-yard field goal	COL 7–3
2	7:54	COL	Michael Westbrook 27-yard pass from Kordell Stewart (Voskeritchian kick)	COL 14–3
2	1:14	MICH	Tim Biakabutuka 4-yard run (pass failed)	COL 14–9
3	10:43	MICH	Tyrone Wheatley 6-yard run (Hayes pass from Collins)	MICH 17–14
3	7:40	MICH	Hamilton 20-yard field goal	MICH 20–14
3	2:43	MICH	Amani Toomer 65-yard pass from Todd Collins (run failed)	MICH 26–14
4	2:16	COL	Salaam 2-yard run (Voskeritchian kick)	MICH 26–21
4	0:00	COL	Westbrook 64-yard pass from Stewart	COL 27–26

Colorado trailed Michigan 26–21 with six seconds left when Stewart heaved the ball more than 70 yards in the air into the end zone where Michael Westbrook caught it on a planned deflection from Blake Anderson for the game winning touchdown. The play, which was named "Rocket Left", was called by Bill McCartney, Colorado coach and former Michigan assistant coach. Westbrook, Anderson and Rae Carruth lined up wide left and James Kidd lined up wide right. The same play was called to end the first half, resulting in a Chuck Winters interception. The game was decided on Colorado quarterback Kordell Stewart's 64-yard Hail Mary pass to Westbrook, the second touchdown by the Buffaloes in the last 2:16. It was one of the wildest finishes in Michigan football history. Tim Biakabutuka and Tyrone Wheatley each ran for a touchdown and Todd Collins completed 17 of 24 passes for 258 yards and a TD pass to Amani Toomer.

=== At Iowa ===
Michigan at Iowa

Team	1	2	3	4	Total
• No. 7 Wolverines	3	10	9	7	29
Hawkeyes	0	7	0	7	14

- Date: October 1
- Location: Kinnick Stadium, Iowa City, Iowa
- Game attendance: 70,397

Scoring summary
1		Mich	Hamilton 30-yard field goal	Mich 3–0
2		Iowa	Ryan Driscoll 1-yard run (Brion Hurley kick)	Iowa 7–3
2		Mich	Tyrone Wheatley 2-yard run (Hamilton kick)	Mich 10–7
2		Mich	Hamilton 32-yard field goal	Mich 13–7
3		Mich	Tim Biakabutuka 7-yard run (kick failed)	Mich 19–7
3		Mich	Hamilton 32-yard field goal	Mich 22–7
4		Iowa	Scott Slutzker 11-yard pass from Ryan Driscoll (Brion Hurley kick)	Mich 22–14
4	0:53	Mich	Tyrone Wheatley 12-yard run (Hamilton kick)	Mich 29–14

Remy Hamilton kicked three field goals and Tyrone Wheatley rushed for 182 yards with two touchdowns as #7 Michigan pulled away late and beat the Hawkeyes, 29–14, at Nile Kinnick Stadium. The Wolverine defense held Iowa to 84 yards rushing and Steve Morrison had 14 tackles and an interception to lead the defense. Amani Toomer caught 5 passes for 93 yards and Tim Biakabutuka added a touchdown run.

=== Michigan State ===
Remy Hamilton kicked 4 field goals and Tyrone Wheatley rushed for 153 yards and two touchdowns while Tim Biakabutuka added 141 yards and a touchdown to lead the #7 ranked Wolverines to a 40–20 victory over Michigan State at Michigan Stadium. Todd Collins completed 16 of 23 passes for 211 yards and a TD pass to Wheatley. Mercury Hayes caught 4 passes for 96 yards. The Michigan defense held the Spartans to 17 yards rushing.

=== Penn State ===
The #3 ranked Nittany Lions held a 16–3 halftime lead on three Brett Conway field goals and a Kerry Collins to Keith Olsommer TD pass, but had to come from behind to beat #5 Michigan, 31–24, at Michigan Stadium. Tyrone Wheatley had touchdown runs of 67 and 21 yards to forge ahead 17–16. Penn State responded with a Jon Wittman 9-yard TD pass from Collins who then threw to Freddie Scott for a 2-point conversion to take the lead, 24–17. The Wolverines tied the game on a Tim Biakabutuka 1-yard run with just under 12 minutes left. With just under 3 minutes left, Collins hit Bobby Engram with a 16-yard scoring strike to put the Nittany Lions ahead for good, 31–24. Brian Miller picked off a Todd Collins pass with 1:26 left to seal the victory. Wheatley finished with 144 yards rushing and Todd Collins completed 14 of 24 passes for 221 yards.

=== At Illinois ===
Despite outgaining Illinois by over 100 yards, #11 Michigan had to hold on for a 19–14 victory over the Fighting Illini at Champaign. Remy Hamilton kicked 4 field goals and Amani Toomer returned a punt 72 yards for a touchdown in the 3rd quarter that was the difference in the game. The Wolverines dominated in time of possession with a 37:00-23:00 minute advantage.

=== Wisconsin ===
Brent Moss ran for 106 yards which opened things up for Darrell Bevell, who was 18 for 26 for 161 yards passing and 3 touchdowns, as the Badgers upset Michigan, 31–19. It was the Badgers' first victory at Ann Arbor since 1962. The Badger defense had three interceptions and three sacks against #10 ranked Michigan. Todd Collins completed 14 of 25 for 172 yards passing with a touchdown and 2 interceptions. Tyrone Wheatley ran for 132 yards and a touchdown, but it wasn't enough to offset the Badgers dominance in time of possession.

=== At Purdue ===
Tyrone Wheatley rushed for 148 yards and two touchdowns, Tim Biakabutuka rushed for 100 yards and a touchdown as #20 Michigan earned a 45–23 victory over the Boilermakers at Ross-Ade Stadium. Ed Davis added a touchdown run and Todd Collins completed 15 of 18 passes for 191 yards with two touchdown passes, one to Pierre Cooper and one to Che Foster. Rob Sweet had an interception to lead the defense.

=== Minnesota ===
Michigan trailed 15–10 at halftime, but exploded for 18 third quarter points to pull away and defeat the Golden Gophers, 38–22 and retain the Little Brown Jug for another year. Todd Collins led the way as he completed 15 of 27 passes for 352 yards and three touchdown passes. Amani Toomer caught 6 passes for 147 yards and two TD receptions. Tyrone Wheatley ran for a touchdown and caught a TD pass from Collins. Remy Hamilton kicked three field goals to round out the Wolverines scoring.

=== At Ohio State ===
The #15 ranked Wolverines trailed 12–3 at halftime and never could recover as the #22 Buckeyes knocked off Michigan, 22–6. The Buckeyes went up 12–0 on a safety, a Bobby Hoying 5-yard TD run and a Josh Jackson 25-yard field goal. Remy Hamilton kicked his 2nd field goal in the 3rd quarter to cut the lead to 12–6 going into the final 15 minutes. Jackson kicked a 36-yard field goal, then Luke Fickell intercepted a Todd Collins pass and Eddie George added a 2-yard touchdown run for the final points to seal the win. Michigan was held to 111 yards on the ground.

#15 Michigan Wolverines at #22 Ohio State Buckeyes

Quarter	1	2	3	4	Total
Michigan	0	3	3	0	6
Ohio St	2	10	0	10	22

at Ohio Stadium, Columbus, Ohio

- Date: November 19, 1994
- Game time: 12:00 p.m. EST
- Game weather: Clear, 60 °F (16 °C)
- Game attendance: 93,869
- Referee: Ron Winter
- TV announcers (ABC): Brent Musburger
- Box Score

Game information

First quarter

- OSU – Safety, Todd Collins downed in end zone, 3:30. Ohio St 2–0.

Second quarter

- OSU – Bobby Hoying 4-yard run (Josh Jackson kick), 14:11. Ohio St 9–0. Drive: 10 plays, 40 yards, 4:14.
- OSU – Josh Jackson 26-yard field goal, 6:22. Ohio St 12–0. Drive: 14 plays, 64 yards, 6:12.
- MICH – Remy Hamilton 22-yard field goal, 3:52. Ohio St 12–3. Drive: 5 plays, 70 yards, 2:24.

Third quarter

- MICH – Remy Hamilton 22-yard field goal, 7:55. Ohio St 12–6. Drive: 11 plays, 65 yards, 5:28.

Fourth quarter

- OSU – Josh Jackson 36-yard field goal, 11:22. Ohio St 15–6. Drive: 7 plays, 29 yards, 3:15.
- OSU – Eddie George 2-yard run (Josh Jackson kick), 8:35. Ohio St 22–6. Drive: 5 plays, 16 yards, 2:35.

Top passers

- MICH – Todd Collins – 13/22, 160 yards, INT
- OSU – Bobby Hoying – 11/18, 125 yards

Top rushers

- MICH – Tyrone Wheatley – 18 rushes, 92 yards
- OSU – Eddie George – 27 rushes, 71 yards, TD

Top receivers

- MICH – Amani Toomer – 3 receptions, 95 yards
- OSU – Joey Galloway – 4 receptions, 46 yards

=== 1994 Holiday Bowl ===
CSU nearly mirrored the Wolverines in total yardage (341–340), but gained just 51 yards rushing against a Michigan defense that forced four turnovers and had a key goal line stand in the second half. Michigan struck first on the game's opening drive on Todd Collins' four-yard TD pass to Amam Toomer with 8:51 left in the opening quarter The Rams took the ensuing kickoff and turned in a nine-play, 66-yard drive to tie the game, 7–7. The drive was culminated by Paul Turner's 32-yard TD reception. All-American Remy Hamilton booted a 34-yard field goal with 2:46 remaining in the first quarter to put Michigan ahead 10–7. A blocked punt by freshman Chris Howard gave Michigan the ball deep in Rams territory with less than two minutes left before halftime. Collins then connected with Mercury Hayes for a 16-yard TD strike to put MICHIGAN ahead 17–7 with 1:28 left in the half. The Wolverines forced a turnover on CSU's first drive of the second half, taking over on the Rams' 17 yard line. Tyrone Wheatley made short work four plays later with a three-yard plunge into the endzone. That gave Michigan a 7 lead with 11:58 left in the third quarter. Midway through the third quarter, a 42-yard pass play helped CSU move the ball from its own 13 yard line to inside the Wolverine 10. A pair of pass interference calls against Michigan gave the Rams seven plays to attempt to go eight yards into the end zone. Four plays from the Michigan two yard line turned up nothing for Colorado State, as a two-yard loss and incomplete pass on fourth down helped the Wolverines turn away the high-scoring Rains. Michigan held a 24–7 advantage after three quarters and held that lead until 1:18 remained in the game. CSU finally cracked the stubborn Michigan defense with an 18-yard TD pass by Anthony Hill to complete the scoring. Collins threw for 162 yards (14 for 24) and two touchdowns, earning the game's offensive MVP honors. The Michigan defense tallied 11 tackles for loss, driving the CSU offense back 61 yards.

== Personnel ==
=== Players ===
1994 Michigan Wolverines football team roster
Players
Coaches
Offense

Pos.	#	Name	Class
RB	21	Tim Biakabutuka	So
QB	10	Todd Collins	Sr
QB	14	Brian Griese	So
WR	9	Mercury Hayes	Jr
OT	77	Trezelle Jenkins	Sr
C	52	Rod Payne	So
OT	69	Jon Runyan	So
TE	16	Jay Riemersma	Jr
WR	18	Amani Toomer	Jr
RB	6	Tyrone Wheatley	Sr

Defense

Pos.	#	Name	Class
DT	96	William Carr	So
LB	91	Matt Dyson	Sr
LB	37	Jarrett Irons	Jr
CB	22	Ty Law	Jr
LB	36	Steve Morrison	Sr
LB	45	Mike Vanderbeek	Jr

Special teams

Pos.	#	Name	Class
K	19	Remy Hamilton	Fr

Head coach

- Gary Moeller

Coordinators/assistant coaches

Legend

- (C) Team captain
- (S) Suspended
- (I) Ineligible
- Injured
- Redshirt

Roster

=== Coaching staff ===
- Head coach: Gary Moeller
- Assistant coaches: Lloyd Carr, Kit Cartwright, Mike DeBord, Bill Harris, Jim Herrmann, Fred Jackson, Greg Mattison, Les Miles, Bobby Morrison
- Trainer: Paul Schmidt
- Managers: Andy Riegler, Joe Allore, Jason Armstrong, Adam Bahr, Kevin Bickner, Patrick Bolger, Joel Gerring, Eddie Magnus, Marty Rice, Sami Samaha

== Statistical achievements ==
Remy Hamilton established the current Big Ten single-season record, which has since been tied three times, for successful field goals at 25. He won the NCAA statistical championship for field goal kickers. Amani Toomer won the Big Ten receiving yardage champion for all games with 91.3 yards per game and the conference games yardage championship with an 87.9 average.

The team earned the fourth of five consecutive and six 1990s Big Ten rushing defense statistical championships for conference games by holding opponents to 112.3 yards per game. However, Illinois won the title for all games.

Tyrone Wheatley ended his career as the school record holder for 100-yard games with 20, surpassing Jamie Morris' 18 set in 1987. Anthony Thomas broke this record when his career ended in 2000. Todd Collins ended his career by surpassing Elvis Grbac's 62.5 career completion percentage record with a 64.3 percentage to establish the current record; tying Grbac's 23 150-yard game total, which was eclipsed by John Navarre in 2003; and surpassing Jim Harbaugh's 12 career 200-yard game total set in 1986 with 14, which was surpassed by Tom Brady in 1999. His 352-yard passing performance on November 12 against Minnesota, which surpassed Harbaugh's 1986 310-yard performance, was a school record that stood for a year until surpassed by Scott Dreisbach. Amani Toomer broke Jack Clancy's single-season reception yard record of 1077 set in 1966, but David Terrell eclipsed this mark in 2000.

== Awards and honors ==
- Co-captains: Steve Morrison, Walter Smith
- All-Americans: Remy Hamilton, Ty Law
- All-Conference: Tyrone Wheatley, Ty Law, Remy Hamilton, Steve Morrison, Amani Toomer, Jason Horn
- Most Valuable Player: Todd Collins
- Meyer Morton Award: Jay Riemersma
- John Maulbetsch Award: Rob Swett
- Frederick Matthei Award: Rob Swett
- Arthur Robinson Scholarship Award: Todd Collins
- Dick Katcher Award: Trent Zenkewicz
- Hugh Rader Jr. Award: Jon Runyan
- Robert P. Ufer Award: Ed Davis
- Roger Zatkoff Award: Steve Morrison

== 1995 NFL draft ==
The following players were claimed in the 1995 NFL draft.

Player	Position	Round	Pick	NFL club
Tyrone Wheatley	Running back	1	17	New York Giants
Ty Law	Cornerback	1	23	New England Patriots
Trezelle Jenkins	Tackle	1	31	Kansas City Chiefs
Todd Collins	Quarterback	2	45	Buffalo Bills
Matt Dyson	Linebacker	5	138	Oakland Raiders
