= 1994 Wisconsin Badgers football team =

American college football season

1994 Wisconsin Badgers football

Hall of Fame Bowl champion

Hall of Fame Bowl, W 34–20 vs. Duke
- Conference: Big Ten Conference
- Record: 8–3–1 (5–2–1 Big Ten)
- Head coach: Barry Alvarez (5th season)
- Offensive coordinator: Brad Childress (3rd season)
- Offensive scheme: Pro-style
- Defensive coordinator: Dan McCarney (5th season)
- Base defense: 3–4
- MVP: Terrell Fletcher
- Captains: Jeff Messenger; Brent Moss; Joe Rudolph; Mike Thompson
- Home stadium: Camp Randall Stadium

1994 Big Ten Conference football standings
| | Conf. | | | | | Overall |
| Team | W | | L | | T | W | | L | | T |
|---|---|---|---|---|---|---|---|---|---|---|
| No. 2 Penn State $ | 8 | – | 0 | – | 0 | 12 | – | 0 | – | 0 |
| No. 14 Ohio State | 6 | – | 2 | – | 0 | 9 | – | 4 | – | 0 |
| Wisconsin | 5 | – | 2 | – | 1 | 8 | – | 3 | – | 1 |
| No. 12 Michigan | 5 | – | 3 | – | 0 | 8 | – | 4 | – | 0 |
| Illinois | 4 | – | 4 | – | 0 | 7 | – | 5 | – | 0 |
| Purdue | 3 | – | 3 | – | 2 | 5 | – | 4 | – | 2 |
| Iowa | 3 | – | 4 | – | 1 | 5 | – | 5 | – | 1 |
| Indiana | 3 | – | 5 | – | 0 | 6 | – | 5 | – | 0 |
| Northwestern | 3 | – | 5 | – | 0 | 4 | – | 6 | – | 1 |
| Minnesota | 1 | – | 7 | – | 0 | 3 | – | 8 | – | 0 |
| Michigan State † | 0 | – | 8 | – | 0 | 0 | – | 11 | – | 0 |
$ – Conference champion; † Michigan State forfeited 5 wins including 4 conference victories, over Wisconsin, Indiana, Northwestern, and Purdue.; Rankings from AP Poll

The 1994 Wisconsin Badgers football team was an American football team that represented the University of Wisconsin–Madison as a member of the Big Ten Conference during the 1994 NCAA Division I-A football season. In their fifth year under head coach Barry Alvarez, the Badgers compiled an 8–3–1 record (5–2–1 in conference games), finished in third place in the Big Ten, and outscored their opponents by a total of 323 to 218. Against ranked opponents, they lost to No. 7 Colorado and defeated No. 25 Indiana and No. 10 Michigan. They concluded the season with a 34–20 victory over No. 25 Duke in the Hall of Fame Bowl. It was the first time in program history that the Badgers won consecutive postseason bowl games. They were unranked in the final AP and Coaches polls.

The team's statistical leaders for all games, including the bowl game, were quarterback Darrell Bevell (1,544 passing yards, 60.2% completion percentage), running back Terrell Fletcher (1,476 rushing yards, 6.0 yards per carry, 80 points scored), wide receiver Tony Simmons (588 receiving yards, 26.7-yard average), and linebacker Pete Monty (131 total tackles). Fletcher was selected as the team's most valuable player. Center Cory Raymer was a consensus first-team selection on the 1994 All-America team. Five Badgers received first-team honors from the Associated Press on the 1994 All-Big Ten team: Raymer; guard Joe Rudolph; tackle Mike Verstegen; defensive lineman Mike Thompson; and defensive back Jeff Messenger.

The team played its home games at Camp Randall Stadium in Madison, Wisconsin.

== Schedule ==
| Date | Time | Opponent | Rank | Site | TV | Result | Attendance | Source |
|---|---|---|---|---|---|---|---|---|
| September 10 | 1:00 p.m. | Eastern Michigan* | No. 10 | Camp Randall Stadium; Madison, WI | | W 56–0 | 77,745 | |
| September 17 | 8:45 p.m. | at No. 7 Colorado* | No. 10 | Folsom Field; Boulder, CO | ESPN | L 17–55 | 53,457 | |
| September 24 | 11:30 a.m. | No. 21 Indiana | No. 16 | Camp Randall Stadium; Madison, WI | ESPN | W 62–13 | 77,745 | |
| October 1 | 11:30 a.m. | at Michigan State | No. 15 | Spartan Stadium; East Lansing, MI | ESPN | W 10–29 (forfeit) | 71,234 | |
| October 8 | 1:00 p.m. | at Northwestern^{†} | No. 24 | Dyche Stadium; Evanston, IL | | W 46–14 | 46,437 | |
| October 15 | 1:00 p.m. | Purdue | No. 23 | Camp Randall Stadium; Madison, WI | | T 27–27 | 77,745 | |
| October 22 | 1:00 p.m. | Minnesota^{†} | | Camp Randall Stadium; Madison, WI (rivalry) | | L 14–17 | 77,745 | |
| October 29 | 11:30 a.m. | at No. 10 Michigan | | Michigan Stadium; Ann Arbor, MI | ESPN | W 31–19 | 106,209 | |
| November 5 | 2:30 p.m. | at Ohio State | | Ohio Stadium; Columbus, OH | ABC | L 3–24 | 93,340 | |
| November 12 | 1:00 p.m. | Cincinnati* | | Camp Randall Stadium; Madison, WI | | W 38–7 | 75,245 | |
| November 19 | 2:30 p.m. | Illinois | | Camp Randall Stadium; Madison, WI | ABC | W 19–13 | 77,745 | |
| January 2, 1995 | 10:00 a.m. | vs. No. 25 Duke* | | Tampa Stadium; Tampa, FL (Hall of Fame Bowl) | ESPN | W 34–20 | 61,384 | |
*Non-conference game; ^{†}Homecoming; Rankings from AP Poll released prior to the game; All times are in Central time

== Personnel ==
=== Roster ===
1994 Wisconsin Badgers football team roster
Players
Coaches
Offense

| Pos. | # | Name | Class |
|---|---|---|---|
| WR | 85 | Steve Baffico | Jr |
| QB | 11 | Darrell Bevell | Jr |
| FB | 20 | Jason Burns | Sr |
| RB | 32 | Branden Cantrell | Fr |
| OT | 68 | Cayetano Castro | So |
| FB | 36 | Azree Commander | So |
| G | 64 | James Darby | So |
| WR | 1 | J. C. Dawkins | Sr |
| WR | 2 | Lee DeRamus (injured) | Sr |
| G | 69 | Derek Engler | So |
| RB | 41 | Terrell Fletcher | Sr |
| G | 59 | Mike Galletti | So |
| C | 62 | Al Gay | So |
| WR | 86 | Donald Hayes | Fr |
| WR | 6 | Kevin Huntley | Fr |
| RB | 21 | Keith Jackson | Sr |
| FB | 22 | Ron Johnson | Jr |
| RB | 34 | Nikki Kemp | Sr |
| TE | 9 | Kevin Lyles | So |
| QB | 16 | Jay Macias | Sr |
| RB | 33 | Brent Moss (C) | Sr |
| TE | 31 | Matt Nyquist | Jr |
| C | 51 | Brian Patterson | Sr |
| C | 56 | Mike Rader | So |
| C | 52 | Cory Raymer | Sr |
| TE | 81 | Michael Roan | Sr |
| RB | 44 | Royce Roberson | Fr |
| OT | 72 | John Rohde | So |
| G | 63 | Joe Rudolph (C) | Sr |
| WR | 82 | Tony Simmons | Fr |
| G | 60 | Steve Stark | Jr |
| WR | 24 | Reggie Torian | Fr |
| G | 65 | Jamie Vanderveldt | So |
| OT | 67 | Mike Verstegen | Sr |
| OT | 71 | Jerry Wunsch | So |
| WR | 87 | Vince Zullo | Sr |

Defense

| Pos. | # | Name | Class |
|---|---|---|---|
| S | 45 | Giscard Bernard | So |
| CB | 23 | Donny Brady | Sr |
| S | 5 | Jamel Brown | Sr |
| CB | 38 | Lamar Campbell | Fr |
| DB | 30 | Theo Carney | Sr |
| S | 19 | Daryl Carter | So |
| LB | 51 | Chad Cascadden | Sr |
| LB | 39 | Pete Diatelevi | So |
| LB | 54 | Brian Flanigan | Fr |
| CB | 3 | Kenny Gales | Sr |
| LB | 46 | Terry Glavin | Jr |
| CB | 27 | Damon Glenn | Fr |
| LB | 50 | Chris Hein | Sr |
| DT | 85 | Bryan Jurewicz | So |
| DT | 67 | Steve Kouba | Jr |
| LB | 57 | David Lysek | Fr |
| NT | 70 | Jason Maniecki | Jr |
| S | 29 | Jeff Messenger (C) | Sr |
| NT | 94 | Neil Miklusak | So |
| LB | 48 | Pete Monty | So |
| LB | 8 | Sylas Pratt | Sr |
| DT | 90 | Haywood Simmons | Jr |
| DT | 91 | Rod Spiller | So |
| LB | 42 | Tarek Saleh | So |
| CB | 28 | Jason Suttle | Fr |
| DL | 92 | Rafael Tercarolli | So |
| DT | 66 | Mike Thompson (C) | Sr |
| S | 17 | Mel Tucker | Sr |
| LB | 47 | Eric Unverzagt | Jr |
| S | 7 | Cyrill Weems | So |
| LB | 55 | Chad Yocum (injured) | Sr |
| DB | 15 | Scott Young | Jr |

Special teams

| Pos. | # | Name | Class |
|---|---|---|---|
| K | 14 | John Hall | So |
| K | 98 | Rick Schnetzky | Sr |
| P | 26 | Sam Veit | Sr |

Head coach

- Barry Alvarez

Coordinators/assistant coaches

- Brad Childress – Offensive Coordinator/Quarterbacks
- Dan McCarney – Defensive Coordinator/Defensive Line
- Bill Callahan – Offensive Line
- Kevin Cosgrove – Inside Linebackers
- Jim Hueber – Running Backs
- Tom McMahon – Defensive Backs
- Jay Norvell – Wide Receivers/Special Teams
- John Palermo – Assistant Head Coach/Outside Linebackers
- Bernie Wyatt – Tight Ends/Recruiting Coordinator

Legend

- (C) Team captain
- (S) Suspended
- (I) Ineligible
- Injured
- Redshirt

=== Regular starters ===
| Position | Player |
|---|---|
| Quarterback | Darrell Bevell |
| Running back | Brent Moss /Terrell Fletcher |
| Fullback | Ron Johnson |
| Wide receiver | Tony Simmons |
| Wide receiver | J.C. Dawkins |
| Tight end | Michael Roan |
| Left tackle | Mike Verstegen |
| Left guard | Joe Rudolph |
| Center | Cory Raymer |
| Right guard | Jamie Vanderveldt / Steve Stark |
| Right tackle | Jerry Wunsch |

| Position | Player |
|---|---|
| Defensive tackle | Mike Thompson |
| Nose guard | Jason Maniecki |
| Defensive tackle | Bryan Jurewicz |
| Outside linebacker | Chris Hein |
| Inside linebacker | Eric Unverzagt |
| Inside linebacker | Pete Monty |
| Outside linebacker | Tarek Saleh |
| Cornerback | Kenny Gales |
| Strong safety | Jamel Brown |
| Free safety | Jeff Messenger |
| Cornerback | Donny Brady |

== 1995 NFL draft ==
| Player | Position | Round | Overall Selection | NFL club |
|---|---|---|---|---|
| Cory Raymer | Center | 2 | 37 | Washington Redskins |
| Terrell Fletcher | Running back | 2 | 51 | San Diego Chargers |
| Mike Verstegen | Tackle | 3 | 75 | New Orleans Saints |
| Michael Roan | Tight end | 4 | 101 | Houston Oilers |
| Mike Thompson | Defensive tackle | 4 | 123 | Jacksonville Jaguars |
| Lee DeRamus | Wide receiver | 6 | 184 | New Orleans Saints |
| Kenny Gales | Cornerback | 6 | 193 | Chicago Bears |
