= 1994 Illinois Fighting Illini football team =

American college football season

1994 Illinois Fighting Illini football

Liberty Bowl champion

Liberty Bowl, W 30–0 vs. East Carolina
- Conference: Big Ten Conference
- Record: 7–5 (4–4 Big Ten)
- Head coach: Lou Tepper (3rd season)
- Offensive coordinator: Greg Landry (2nd season)
- Defensive coordinator: Denny Marcin (3rd season)
- MVP: Dana Howard
- Captains: Pete Gabrione; John Holecek; Dana Howard; Jon Kerr
- Home stadium: Memorial Stadium

1994 Big Ten Conference football standings
	Conf.					Overall
Team	W		L		T	W		L		T
No. 2 Penn State $	8	–	0	–	0	12	–	0	–	0
No. 14 Ohio State	6	–	2	–	0	9	–	4	–	0
Wisconsin	5	–	2	–	1	8	–	3	–	1
No. 12 Michigan	5	–	3	–	0	8	–	4	–	0
Illinois	4	–	4	–	0	7	–	5	–	0
Purdue	3	–	3	–	2	5	–	4	–	2
Iowa	3	–	4	–	1	5	–	5	–	1
Indiana	3	–	5	–	0	6	–	5	–	0
Northwestern	3	–	5	–	0	4	–	6	–	1
Minnesota	1	–	7	–	0	3	–	8	–	0
Michigan State †	0	–	8	–	0	0	–	11	–	0
$ – Conference champion; † Michigan State forfeited 5 wins including 4 conference victories, over Wisconsin, Indiana, Northwestern, and Purdue.; Rankings from AP Poll

The 1994 Illinois Fighting Illini football team was an American football team that represented the University of Illinois at Urbana-Champaign as a member of the Big Ten Conference during the 1994 NCAA Division I-A football season. In their third year under head coach Lou Tepper, the Fighting Illini compiled a 7–5 record (4–4 in conference games), finished in fifth place in the Big Ten, and outscored opponents by a total of 279 to 156. They concluded the season in the 1994 Liberty Bowl, defeating East Carolina by a 30–0 score.

The team's statistical leaders included quarterback Johnny Johnson (2,245 passing yards), running back Ty Douthard (713 rushing yards), wide receiver Jason Dulick (679 receiving yards), and kicker Chris Richardson (73 points scored, 31 of 32 extra points, 12 of 16 field goals).

The team played its home games at Memorial Stadium in Champaign, Illinois.

Its game against Washington State at Soldier Field was its first game in Chicago since the Chicago Maroons football's final game as a major Big Ten football program in the 1939 Big Ten Conference football season.

== Schedule ==
Date	Time	Opponent	Rank	Site	TV	Result	Attendance	Source
September 1	7:30 pm	vs. Washington State*	No. 22	Soldier Field; Chicago, IL		L 9–10	39,472	
September 10	1:00 pm	Missouri*		Memorial Stadium; Champaign, IL (rivalry)		W 42–0	64,305	
September 17	1:00 pm	Northern Illinois*		Memorial Stadium; Champaign, IL		W 34–10	55,327	
October 1	1:00 pm	Purdue^{†}	No. 25	Memorial Stadium; Champaign, IL (rivalry)		L 16–22	58,338	
October 8	2:30 pm	at No. 17 Ohio State		Ohio Stadium; Columbus, OH (Illibuck)	ABC	W 24–10	93,351	
October 15	1:00 pm	Iowa		Memorial Stadium; Champaign, IL		W 47–7	59,573	
October 22	2:30 pm	No. 11 Michigan		Memorial Stadium; Champaign, IL (rivalry)	ABC	L 14–19	72,677	
October 29	1:00 pm	at Northwestern		Dyche Stadium; Evanston, IL (rivalry)		W 28–7	40,365	
November 5	1:30 pm	at Minnesota		Hubert H. Humphrey Metrodome; Minneapolis, MN		W 21–17	35,069	
November 12	2:30 pm	No. 2 Penn State		Memorial Stadium; Champaign, IL	ABC	L 31–35	72,364	
November 19	2:30 pm	at Wisconsin		Camp Randall Stadium; Madison, WI	ABC	L 13–19	77,745	
December 31	12:00 pm	vs. East Carolina*		Liberty Bowl Memorial Stadium; Memphis, TN (Liberty Bowl)	ESPN	W 30–0	33,280	
*Non-conference game; ^{†}Homecoming; Rankings from AP Poll released prior to the game; All times are in Central time

== Roster ==
1994 Illinois Fighting Illini football team roster
Players
Coaches
Offense

Pos.	#	Name	Class
OT	73	Ken Blackman	Jr
TE	86	Matt Cushing	Fr
TE	87	Ken Dilger	Sr
QB	13	Johnny Johnson	Jr
RB	38	George McDonald	Fr

Defense

Pos.	#	Name	Class
LB	51	Kevin Hardy	Jr
LB	52	John Holecek	Sr
DE	97	Simeon Rice	Jr
CB	29	Scott Turner	Sr

Special teams

Pos.	#	Name	Class

Head coach

- Lou Tepper

Coordinators/assistant coaches

Legend

- (C) Team captain
- (S) Suspended
- (I) Ineligible
- Injured
- Redshirt

Roster

== 1995 NFL draft ==
Player	Position	Round	Pick	NFL club
Ken Dilger	Tight end	2	48	Indianapolis Colts
