= Freddie Scott (American football, born 1974) =

American football player (born 1974)

Freddie Scott II
No. 84, 15
- Position: Wide receiver

Personal information
- Born: August 26, 1974; Southfield, Michigan, U.S.
- Listed height: 5 ft 10 in (1.78 m)
- Listed weight: 188 lb (85 kg)

Career information
- High school: Southfield
- College: Penn State
- NFL draft: 1996: undrafted

Career history
- Atlanta Falcons (1996–1997); Indianapolis Colts (1998); Detroit Lions (1999)*; Nashville Kats (2000–2001)
- * Offseason or practice squad member only

Career NFL statistics
- Receptions: 7
- Receiving yards: 80
- Stats at Pro Football Reference

Career AFL statistics
- Receptions: 39
- Receiving yards: 383
- Touchdowns: 4
- Stats at ArenaFan.com

Freddie Lee Scott Jr. (born August 26, 1974) is an American former professional football player who was a wide receiver in the National Football League (NFL). He played college football for the Penn State Nittany Lions. Scott played in the NFL for the Atlanta Falcons from 1996 to 1997 and Indianapolis Colts in 1998. His father Freddie Scott and his brother Brandon Scott played for Bowling Green State University.

Pre-draft measurables
Height	Weight	Arm length	Hand span	40-yard dash	10-yard split	20-yard split	Vertical jump
5 ft 10 1/2 in (1.79 m)	189 lb (86 kg)	31 3/4 in (0.81 m)	9 3/8 in (0.24 m)	4.70 s	1.65 s	2.76 s	30.0 in (0.76 m)
