= Brion Hurley =

American football player (born 1974)

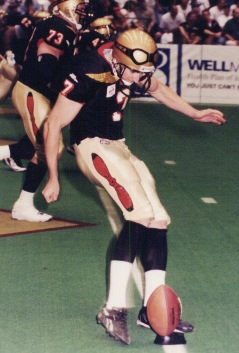
- Brion Hurley kickoff with Iowa Barnstormers in 1998

No. 20
- Position: Placekicker/Punter

Personal information
- Born: March 13, 1974 (age 52); Iowa City, Iowa
- Listed height: 6 ft 4 in (1.93 m)
- Listed weight: 215 lb (98 kg)

Career information
- High school: Iowa City (IA) City
- College: Iowa

Career history
- New York Giants (1997)*; Iowa Barnstormers (1998); New York Giants (1999)*; Quad City Steamwheelers (2000–2001)
- * Offseason or practice squad member only

Career AFL statistics as of 1998
- Field goals: 7
- Field goals attempted: 25
- Field goal %: 28
- Longest field goal: 55
- Extra points made: 20
- Stats at ArenaFan.com

Brion Matthew Hurley (born March 13, 1974) is an American former football player. He attended the University of Iowa and was a placekicker and punter from 1993 to 1996. He was signed by the New York Giants as an undrafted free agent kicker and punter in 1997.

== Early life ==
Hurley attended City High School (Iowa) in Iowa City, Iowa and lettered in football, soccer and basketball. In football, he was named Des Moines Register first team All-State Class 4A placekicker for 1991, and received first team All-Conference honors as a junior (1990) and senior (1991) as a placekicker.

== College career ==
Hurley was invited to walk on and play college football at the University of Iowa. After redshirting his freshman season, he competed with Nick Gallery for the starting punter position at the start of the 1993 season. He took over placekicking duties at the end of the season, and made his first college field goal during the 1993 inaugural Alamo Bowl, which were Iowa's only points in a 37–3 loss to California. He earned a full-ride scholarship after the season.

After losing the placekicking job in 1994 and again in 1995, he took over the long field goals and short punt duties during the 1995 season. He was named special teams MVP of the 1995 Sun Bowl for his performance in Iowa's upset win over the Washington Huskies, after kicking three long fields of 49 yards, 47 yards and 50 yards.

He ended his Iowa career 13 of 26 on field goals, but was 6 for 9 on field goals of 50 yards or longer, with a career long of 54 yards vs Iowa State in 1996.

== Professional career ==
He was signed by the New York Giants as an undrafted free agent kicker and punter in 1997, but was released at the end of the preseason. In 1998, he signed with the Iowa Barnstormers of the Arena Football League and was 7 for 25 on fields goals, with a long of 55 yards, and kicked a game-winning 28-yard field goal with 32 seconds left against the San Jose Sabercats. He re-signed with the New York Giants as a free agent punter in 1999. During the 2000 and 2001 seasons, he played for the AF2 champion Quad City Steamwheelers. He was the highest paid player in the league during those two seasons, playing in every regular season game, all three playoff games both years ($200 per game per player), and receiving the $50 win bonus in all but one game (37 wins, 1 loss).

== Publications ==
- Hurley, Brion. Lean Six Sigma for Good: How improvement experts can help people in need, and help improve the environment. Portland, Oregon, Odin Ink (2017).
