= Brett Conway =

American football player (born 1975)

No. 5, 1, 9
- Position: Placekicker

Personal information
- Born: March 8, 1975 (age 51); Atlanta, Georgia, U.S.
- Listed height: 6 ft 2 in (1.88 m)
- Listed weight: 208 lb (94 kg)

Career information
- High school: Parkview (Lilburn, Georgia)
- College: Penn State
- NFL draft: 1997: 3rd round, 90th overall pick

Career history
- Green Bay Packers (1997); New York Jets (1998)*; Washington Redskins (1998–2000); Oakland Raiders (2000); New York Jets (2000); Washington Redskins (2001–2002); Indianapolis Colts (2003)*; New York Giants (2003); Cleveland Browns (2003); Minnesota Vikings (2004)*
- * Offseason or practice squad member only

Awards and highlights
- First-team All-Big Ten (1996); Second-team All-Big Ten (1995)

Career NFL statistics
- Field goals made: 69
- Field goal attempts: 91
- Field goal %: 75.8
- Longest field goal: 55
- Stats at Pro Football Reference

Brett Alan Conway (born March 8, 1975) is an American former professional football player who was a placekicker for seven seasons with various teams in the National Football League (NFL). He was selected by the Green Bay Packers in the third round of the 1997 NFL draft. Conway played college football at Penn State, where his 276 career points rank him second all-time, and his 119 consecutive extra points are a school record.

== Early life ==
Conway attended Parkview High School in Lilburn, Georgia. He was a lifelong soccer player who took up placekicking his sophomore year. He assumed kicking duties at Parkview as a junior, converting 8 of 12 field goals and a perfect 12 for 12 on extra points earning All-Gwinnett County honors. That season, he kicked a 55-yard field goal.

As a senior, Conway earned Parade All-American honors in 1992 and tied a county record with 11 field goals.

He kicked five field goals greater that 50 yards during his high school career, including a 58-yarder against Cedar Shoals his senior year which was then one yard short of the state record.

== College career ==
Conway chose Penn State over other major programs including Tennessee, Georgia, Notre Dame, Florida State, and Florida.

In 1993, Conway primarily handled kickoffs as a true freshman, and served as a reserve placekicker to starter Craig Fayak. Conway kicked a 28-yard field goal and three extra points in a 70-7 victory over Maryland for his first collegiate points.

In 1994, Conway emerged as Penn State’s primary kicker after the graduation of Fayak. He made 10 of 12 field goals and 62 of 63 extra-point attempts, scoring 92 points, one of the highest single-season totals by a kicker in school history.

During 1995, Conway continued as the team’s starting kicker, converting 16 of 24 field goals and a perfect 37 of 37 extra points. He finished the season with 85 points and earned Second-team All-Big Ten honors.

Conway concluded his career in 1996 with his strongest season. He made 18 of 24 field-goal attempts with a long of 52-yards, while remaining perfect on extra points at 39 for 39, totaling 93 points, His performance earned him First-team All-Big Ten recognition.

Over his career, Conway converted 45 of 61 field goals and 141 of 142 extra points, scoring 276 total points. He also set a Penn State record with 119 consecutive made extra points.

He kicked in four bowl games: Citrus, Rose, Outback, and Fiesta. At the end of his senior year, Conway was chosen to participate in the Senior Bowl.

== Professional career ==
Conway was considered the top placekicker going into the 1997 NFL Draft. At the NFL Combine, Conway converted 12 of 15 field goals.

Green Bay Packers & New York Jets (1997-1998)

Conway was selected by the Green Bay Packers in the 3rd round of the Draft (90th pick overall) with the anticipation of him replacing the Packers' former stalwart kicker, Chris Jacke. However, Conway injured his quadriceps in the process of correcting a kicking mechanics issue after missing three field goals in an exhibition game against the New England Patriots. The Packers instead went with undrafted free agent Ryan Longwell, when Conway was unable to play.

Longwell and Conway then competed for the starting role for the 1998 season, with Conway getting subsequently traded to the New York Jets.

Washington Redskins (1998–1999)

Conway’s most significant tenure came with the Washington Redskins, where he handled both field goals and extra points over multiple seasons. In 1998, his first year on the active roster, he appeared in six games as a kickoff specialist.

In 1999, Conway played in all 16 games, making 22 of 32 field goals (68.8%) with a long of 51 yards and converted 49 of 50 extra points for 115 points.

Oakland Raiders, New York Jets and Washington Redskins (2000)

During the 2000 season, Conway had short assignments with two other teams in addition to Washington. Conway began the season with the Redskins, where he was perfect on his field goals, going 3 for 3, and made 3 extra point attempts over two games before suffering an injury.

With the Oakland Raiders, he played one game, connecting on his lone field goal and all three extra points for 6 points. Shortly thereafter he joined the New York Jets making two field goals on two attempts and both extra points for 8 points.

Washington Redskins (2001–2002)

The 2001 season saw Conway again handle kicking duties for a full season, making 26 of 33 field goals (78.8%) with career long field of 55 yards, along with 22 extra points. Against the Carolina Panthers in Week 6, Conway kicked a 23-yarder in overtime to give the Redskins a 17-14 victory. In 2002, Conway began the season as Redskins placekicker, making his only field goal attempt and all extra point tries before tearing a leg muscle against the Arizona Cardinals.

New York Giants & Cleveland Browns (2003)

In his final NFL season (2003), Conway split time between the New York Giants and the Cleveland Browns. With the Giants over five games, he made 9 of 12 field goals (75.0%) and all 6 extra points, contributing 33 points. Conway kicked a game winning field goal from 29-yards against the New York Jets in Week 9.

With the Browns over three games, he made 5 of 7 field goals (71.4%) and all 3 extra points for 18 points.

Minnesota Vikings (2004)

Conway signed with the Minnesota Vikings for the teams final exhibition game. He was released in favor of Morten Andersen prior to the regular season.

Career Summary

Across his NFL career of 51 games, Conway finished with 69 field goals made on 91 attempts (75.8%) and 92 extra points made on 93 attempts for 299 total points.

== Life after football ==
Conway is married and resides in the Chicago area.
