= Chad May =

American football player (born 1971)

No. 5
- Position: Quarterback

Personal information
- Born: September 28, 1971 (age 55); West Covina, California, U.S.
- Listed height: 6 ft 1 in (1.85 m)
- Listed weight: 219 lb (99 kg)

Career information
- High school: Damien (La Verne, California)
- College: Kansas State
- NFL draft: 1995: 4th round, 111th overall pick

Career history
- Minnesota Vikings (1995); Arizona Cardinals (1996); Frankfurt Galaxy (1997); Cincinnati Bengals (1998)*; Miami Dolphins (1998)*; Arizona Rattlers (1999); Arizona Rattlers (2001)
- * Offseason or practice squad member only

Awards and highlights
- AFL All-Rookie Team (1999); 2× First-team All-Big Eight (1993, 1994)

Career AFL statistics
- TD–INT: 38–4
- Passing yards: 2,027
- Passer rating: 117.63
- Stats at ArenaFan.com

Chad May (born September 28, 1971) is an American former professional football quarterback for the Minnesota Vikings in the National Football League (NFL) in 1995 and the Arizona Cardinals in 1996. He was selected in the fourth round of the 1995 NFL draft. He joined the World League of American Football (WLAF)'s Frankfurt Galaxy in 1997. May played for the Arizona Rattlers in the Arena Football League (AFL) in 1999 and 2001. He played college football at Kansas State in 1993 and 1994.

== Early life ==
May attended Damien High School in La Verne, California. While there, he completed 126-of-254 passes for 1,801 yards and 12 touchdowns as a senior. He earned all-league, all-city and All-San Gabriel Valley honors. He also earned all-league honors as a shortstop on the baseball team, hitting .489 as a senior.

== College career ==
May initially played as a freshman at Cal State Fullerton in 1991, and won the starting job in the third game of the season and guided Fullerton to a 17–10 win over Cal State Northridge. He completed 97 of 233 passes (41.6%) on the year for 1,066 yards and threw four touchdowns and nine interceptions. He transferred to Kansas State prior to the 1992 season. He sat out the entire season due to NCAA rules.

May earned All-Big Eight honors in 1993 and 1994 while leading Kansas State to back-to-back bowl appearances. He threw for a school-record 2,682 yards (a mark since broken by Michael Bishop followed by Josh Freeman) in 1993 as Kansas State went 9–2–1 with a 52–17 Copper Bowl victory over Wyoming in the Wildcats' first bowl appearance in 11 years. He passed for 2,571 yards in 1994 as Kansas State went 9–3 and lost 12–7 to Boston College in the 1994 Aloha Bowl. He also set a school single-game record with 489 passing yards in a 45–28 loss to Nebraska in 1993.

=== College statistics ===
		Passing						
Season	Team	GP	Att	Cmp	Pct	Yds	TD	Int
1993	Kansas State Wildcats	11	350	185	52.9	2,682	10	16
1994	Kansas State Wildcats	11	337	200	59.4	2,571	18	6
Career		22	687	385	56.0	5,253	28	22
