= 1994 Colorado Buffaloes football team =

American college football season

1994 Colorado Buffaloes football

Fiesta Bowl champion

Fiesta Bowl, W 41–24 vs. Notre Dame
- Conference: Big Eight Conference

Ranking
- Coaches: No. 3
- AP: No. 3
- Record: 11–1 (6–1 Big 8)
- Head coach: Bill McCartney (13th season)
- Offensive coordinator: Elliot Uzelac (2nd season)
- Offensive scheme: Single set back
- Defensive coordinator: Mike Hankwitz (7th season)
- Base defense: 3–4
- MVP: Kordell Stewart
- Captains: Christian Fauria; Chris Hudson
- Home stadium: Folsom Field

1994 Big Eight Conference football standings
	Conf.					Overall
Team	W		L		T	W		L		T
No. 1 Nebraska $	7	–	0	–	0	13	–	0	–	0
No. 3 Colorado %	6	–	1	–	0	11	–	1	–	0
No. 19 Kansas State	5	–	2	–	0	9	–	3	–	0
Oklahoma	4	–	3	–	0	6	–	6	–	0
Kansas	3	–	4	–	0	6	–	5	–	0
Missouri	2	–	5	–	0	3	–	8	–	1
Oklahoma State	0	–	6	–	1	3	–	7	–	1
Iowa State	0	–	6	–	1	0	–	10	–	1
$ – Bowl Coalition representative as champion % – Bowl Coalition at-large representative; Rankings from AP Poll

The 1994 Colorado Buffaloes football team represented the University of Colorado at Boulder as a member of the Big Eight Conference during the 1994 NCAA Division I FBS football season. Led by Bill McCartney in his 13th and final season as head coach, the Buffaloes compiled an overall record of 11–1 in a mark of 6–1 in conference play, placing second in the Big 8. Colorado was invited to the Fiesta Bowl, where the Buffalos defeated Notre Dame. The team was ranked No. 3 in the final AP poll and the final Coaches Poll. Colorado played home games at Folsom Field in Boulder, Colorado.

Colorado running back Rashaan Salaam won the Heisman Trophy as college football's most outstanding player. The Buffaloes offense scored 439 points while the defense allowed 235 points.

Colorado's only loss of the season came on the road against eventual consensus national champion Nebraska. The Buffaloes, ranked No. 2 at the time, was in line to play for the national title as part of the Bowl Coalition. They were leapfrogged in the polls by the Cornhuskers, who had been ranked No. 3. Colorado finished regular season ranked No. 4. The problem of scheduling bowl match-ups for top-ranked teams led to the dissolution of the Bowl Coalition and the creation of the Bowl Alliance. No. 2 Penn State was not eligible as a member of the Big Ten Conference to Nebraska. Notre Dame, playing as an independent, had its own agreement with the Bowl Coalition, which allowed the Fiesta Bowl to choose the Fighting Irish as an at-large opponent over more highly ranked teams.

== Schedule ==
Date	Time	Opponent	Rank	Site	TV	Result	Attendance
September 3	12:00 pm	Northeast Louisiana*	No. 8	Folsom Field; Boulder, CO		W 48–13	48,114
September 17	7:45 pm	No. 10 Wisconsin*	No. 7	Folsom Field; Boulder, CO	ESPN	W 55–17	53,457
September 24	1:30 pm	at No. 4 Michigan*	No. 7	Michigan Stadium; Ann Arbor, MI (Miracle at Michigan)	ABC	W 27–26	106,427
October 1	1:30 pm	at No. 16 Texas*	No. 5	Texas Memorial Stadium; Austin, TX	ABC	W 34–31	77,809
October 8	12:00 pm	at Missouri	No. 5	Faurot Field; Columbia, MO	PSN	W 38–23	38,901
October 15	7:30 pm	No. 22 Oklahoma	No. 4	Folsom Field; Boulder, CO	ESPN	W 45–7	53,199
October 22	5:30 pm	No. 19 Kansas State	No. 2	Folsom Field; Boulder, CO (rivalry)	ESPN	W 35–21	52,955
October 29	1:30 pm	at No. 3 Nebraska	No. 2	Memorial Stadium; Lincoln, NE (rivalry, College GameDay)	ABC	L 7–24	76,131
November 5	12:00 pm	Oklahoma State^{†}	No. 7	Folsom Field; Boulder, CO		W 17–3	51,059
November 12	12:00 pm	at Kansas	No. 7	Memorial Stadium; Lawrence, KS	PSN	W 51–26	35,000
November 19	12:00 pm	Iowa State	No. 7	Folsom Field; Boulder, CO	PSN	W 41–20	46,113
January 2	2:30 pm	vs. Notre Dame*	No. 4	Sun Devil Stadium; Tempe, AZ (Fiesta Bowl)	NBC	W 41–24	73,968
*Non-conference game; ^{†}Homecoming; Rankings from AP Poll released prior to the game; All times are in Mountain time

== Rankings ==
Ranking movements Legend: ██ Increase in ranking ██ Decrease in ranking ( ) = First-place votes
	Week																
Poll	Pre	1	2	3	4	5	6	7	8	9	10	11	12	13	14	15	Final
AP	8	8	7	7	7	5 (1)	5 (3)	4 (4)	2 (15)	2 (16)	7	7	7	6	5	4	3
Coaches	7		7	7	7	5 (1)	5 (1)	4 (1)	3 (9)	3 (9)	7	7	7	7	5	5	3

== Game summaries ==
=== Northeast Louisiana ===
Northeast Louisiana at Colorado

Team	1	2	3	4	Total
Indians	3	3	0	7	13
• No. 8 Buffaloes	7	21	14	6	48

- Date: September 3
- Location: Folsom Field
- Game attendance: 48,114

Scoring summary
Q1	NLU	Miller 36 yard field goal	NLU 3–0
Q1	COL	Salaam 1 yard run (Voskeritchian kick)	COL 7–3
Q2	NLU	Miller 43 yard field goal	COL 7–6
Q2	COL	Salaam 9 yard run (Voskeritchian kick)	COL 14–6
Q2	COL	Stewart 6 yard run (Voskeritchian kick)	COL 21—6
Q2	COL	Kidd 44 yard pass from Stewart (Voskeritchian kick)	COL 28–6
Q3	COL	Stewart 58 yard run (Voskeritchian kick)	COL 35–6
Q3	COL	Salaam 15 yard run (Voskeritchian kick)	COL 42–6
Q4	COL	Troutman 13 yard run (kick failed)	COL 48–6
Q4	NLU	S. Williams 10 yard pass from Philyaw (Miller kick)	COL 48–13

- Rashan Salaam 24 Rush, 184 Yds

=== Michigan ===
Colorado at Michigan

Team	1	2	3	4	Total
• No. 7 Buffaloes	7	7	0	13	27
No. 4 Wolverines	0	9	17	0	26

- Date: September 24
- Location: Michigan Stadium, Ann Arbor, Michigan
- Game attendance: 106,427
- TV announcers (ABC): Keith Jackson, Bob Griese, and Lynn Swann

Scoring summary
1		COL	Rashaan Salaam 2-yard run (Voskeritchian kick)	COL 7–0
2	11:34	MICH	Remy Hamilton 33-yard field goal	COL 7–3
2	7:54	COL	Michael Westbrook 27-yard pass from Kordell Stewart (Voskeritchian kick)	COL 14–3
2	1:14	MICH	Tim Biakabutuka 4-yard run (pass failed)	COL 14–9
3	10:43	MICH	Tyrone Wheatley 6-yard run (Hayes pass from Collins)	MICH 17–14
3	7:40	MICH	Hamilton 20-yard field goal	MICH 20–14
3	2:43	MICH	Amani Toomer 65-yard pass from Todd Collins (run failed)	MICH 26–14
4	2:16	COL	Rashaan Salaam 2-yard run (Voskeritchian kick)	MICH 26–21
4	0:00	COL	Westbrook 64-yard pass from Stewart	COL 27–26

The Miracle at Michigan refers to the final play that occurred during the game played on September 24, 1994, between the Colorado Buffaloes and the Michigan Wolverines at Michigan Stadium in Ann Arbor, Michigan. The game was decided on Colorado quarterback Kordell Stewart's 64-yard Hail Mary pass to Michael Westbrook, which gave the play its name.

=== Nebraska ===
Colorado at Nebraska

Team	1	2	3	4	Total
No. 2 Buffaloes	0	0	7	0	7
• No. 3 Cornhuskers	7	10	7	0	24

- Date: October 29
- Location: Memorial Stadium, Lincoln, Nebraska
- Game attendance: 76,131

Scoring summary
1		NEB	Cory Schlesinger 14-yard run (Tom Sieler kick)	NEB 7–0
2	9:01	NEB	Sieler 24-yard field goal	NEB 10–0
2	0:36	NEB	Clinton Childs 2-yard run (Sieler kick)	NEB 17–0
3	10:42	NEB	Eric Alford 30-yard pass from Brook Berringer (Sieler kick)	NEB 24–0
3	1:06	COL	Rashaan Salaam 6 run (Neil Voskeritchian kick)	NEB 24–7

=== Fiesta Bowl ===
Colorado vs. Notre Dame

Team	1	2	3	4	Total
• No. 4 Buffaloes	10	21	3	7	41
Fighting Irish	3	7	7	7	24

- Date: January 2
- Location: Sun Devil Stadium, Tempe, Arizona
- Game attendance: 73,968

== Roster ==
1994 Colorado Buffaloes football team roster
Players
Coaches
Offense

Pos.	#	Name	Class
QB	1	Vance Joseph	Sr
WR	2	James Kidd	So
QB	10	Kordell Stewart	Sr
WR	12	Michael Westbrook	Sr
QB	14	Koy Detmer	So
RB	19	Rashaan Salaam	Jr
WR	21	Rae Carruth	So
RB	26	Herchell Troutman	Fr
C	64	Bryan Stoltenberg	Jr
WR	80	Phil Savoy	Fr
TE	88	Christian Fauria	Sr

Defense

Pos.	#	Name	Class
FS	6	T. J. Cunningham	Jr
LB	16	Matt Russell	So
LB	46	Ted Johnson	Sr
CB	47	Chris Hudson	Sr
DT	92	Shannon Clavelle	Jr
DT	93	Darius Holland	Sr

Special teams

Pos.	#	Name	Class
K	17	Neil Voskeritchian	Jr
P	21	Ron Mayer	Sr

Head coach

- Bill McCartney

Coordinators/assistant coaches

- Elliot Uzelac – Offensive coordinator
- Mike Hankwitz – Defensive coordinator
- Rick Neuheisel – Assistant coach
- Chuck Heater – Defensive backs
- Ben Gregory – Running backs

Legend

- (C) Team captain
- (S) Suspended
- (I) Ineligible
- Injured
- Redshirt

Roster

== Awards and honors ==
- Chris Hudson, Jim Thorpe Award
- Rashaan Salaam, Doak Walker Award
- Rashaan Salaam, Heisman Trophy
- Rashaan Salaam, Walter Camp Award

== Players drafted in the 1995 NFL draft ==
Player	Position	Round	Pick	NFL club
Michael Westbrook	Wide receiver	1	4	Washington Redskins
Rashaan Salaam	Running back	1	21	Chicago Bears
Christian Fauria	Tight end	2	39	Seattle Seahawks
Ted Johnson	Linebacker	2	57	New England Patriots
Kordell Stewart	Quarterback	2	60	Pittsburgh Steelers
Darius Holland	Defensive tackle	3	65	Green Bay Packers
Chris Hudson	Defensive back	3	71	Jacksonville Jaguars
Derek West	Tackle	5	149	Indianapolis Colts
Shannon Clavelle	Defensive end	6	185	Buffalo Bills
