= Veland =

Veland is a surname. Notable people with the surname include:

- Morten Veland (born 1977), Norwegian musician, composer, songwriter, and producer
- Tony Veland (born 1973), American football player
