= 1994 Iowa State Cyclones football team =

American college football season

1994 Iowa State Cyclones football
- Conference: Big Eight Conference
- Record: 0–10–1 (0–6–1 Big 8)
- Head coach: Jim Walden (8th season)
- Home stadium: Cyclone Stadium

1994 Big Eight Conference football standings
	Conf.					Overall
Team	W		L		T	W		L		T
No. 1 Nebraska $	7	–	0	–	0	13	–	0	–	0
No. 3 Colorado %	6	–	1	–	0	11	–	1	–	0
No. 19 Kansas State	5	–	2	–	0	9	–	3	–	0
Oklahoma	4	–	3	–	0	6	–	6	–	0
Kansas	3	–	4	–	0	6	–	5	–	0
Missouri	2	–	5	–	0	3	–	8	–	1
Oklahoma State	0	–	6	–	1	3	–	7	–	1
Iowa State	0	–	6	–	1	0	–	10	–	1
$ – Bowl Coalition representative as champion % – Bowl Coalition at-large representative; Rankings from AP Poll

The 1994 Iowa State Cyclones football team represented Iowa State University as a member of the Big Eight Conference during the 1994 NCAA Division I-A football season. Led by Jim Walden in his eighth and final season as head coach, the Cyclones compiled an overall record of 0–10–1 with a mark of 0–6–1 in conference play, tying for seventh place at the bottom of the Big 8 standings. Iowa State played home games at Cyclone Stadium in Ames, Iowa.

Walden retired from coaching after the conclusion of the season.

== Schedule ==
Date	Time	Opponent	Site	TV	Result	Attendance	Source
September 3	1:00 p.m.	Northern Iowa*	Cyclone Stadium; Ames, IA		L 14–28	40,295	
September 10	2:30 p.m.	at Iowa*	Kinnick Stadium; Iowa City, IA (rivalry)	ABC	L 9–37	70,397	
September 17	1:00 p.m.	Western Michigan*	Cyclone Stadium; Ames, IA		L 19–23	32,080	
September 24	1:00 p.m.	Rice*	Cyclone Stadium; Ames, IA		L 18–28	31,106	
October 1	1:30 p.m.	at No. 21 Oklahoma	Oklahoma Memorial Stadium; Norman, OK		L 6–34	65,821	
October 15	1:00 p.m.	Kansas^{†}	Cyclone Stadium; Ames, IA		L 23–41	32,563	
October 22	2:00 p.m.	at Oklahoma State	Lewis Field; Stillwater, OK		T 31–31	36,310	
October 29	1:00 p.m.	Missouri	Cyclone Stadium; Ames, IA (rivalry)		L 20–34	31,530	
November 5	1:10 p.m.	at No. 15 Kansas State	KSU Stadium; Manhattan, KS (rivalry)		L 20–38	38,572	
November 12	1:00 p.m.	No. 1 Nebraska	Cyclone Stadium; Ames, IA (rivalry)		L 12–28	45,186	
November 19	1:00 p.m.	at No. 7 Colorado	Folsom Field; Boulder, CO	PSN	L 20–41	46,113	
*Non-conference game; ^{†}Homecoming; Rankings from AP Poll released prior to the game; All times are in Central time

== Roster ==
1994 Iowa State Cyclones football team roster
Players			Coaches
Offense: Pos. / # / Name / Class; RB / / Troy Davis / So	Defense: Pos. / # / Name / Class	Special teams: Pos. / # / Name / Class	Head coach: Jim Walden; Coordinators/assistant coaches Legend: (C) Team captain; (S) Suspended; (I) Ineligible; Injured; Redshirt
