= 1994 Cincinnati Bearcats football team =

American college football season

1994 Cincinnati Bearcats football
- Conference: Independent
- Record: 2–8–1
- Head coach: Rick Minter (1st season)
- Offensive coordinator: Dana Bible (1st season)
- Offensive scheme: Pro-style
- Defensive coordinator: Mike Cassity (1st season)
- Base defense: 4–3
- Home stadium: Nippert Stadium

1994 NCAA Division I-A independents football records
	Conf.			Overall
Team	W	L	T	W		L		T
East Carolina		–		7	–	5	–	0
Louisville		–		6	–	5	–	0
Memphis		–		6	–	5	–	0
Southern Miss		–		6	–	5	–	0
Notre Dame		–		6	–	5	–	1
Army		–		4	–	7	–	0
Northeast Louisiana		–		3	–	8	–	0
Navy		–		3	–	8	–	0
Tulsa		–		3	–	8	–	0
Cincinnati		–		2	–	8	–	1
Tulane		–		1	–	10	–	0
Rankings from AP Poll

The 1994 Cincinnati Bearcats football team represented the University of Cincinnati during the 1994 NCAA Division I-A football season. The Bearcats, led by first-year head coach Rick Minter, participated as independents and played their home games at Nippert Stadium.

== Schedule ==
Date	Opponent	Site	Result	Attendance	Source
September 3	at Indiana	Memorial Stadium; Bloomington, IN	L 3–28	31,284	
September 10	Syracuse	Nippert Stadium; Cincinnati, OH	L 19–34	21,735	
September 17	at Miami (OH)	Yager Stadium; Oxford, OH (Victory Bell)	T 17–17		
October 1	Bowling Green	Nippert Stadium; Cincinnati, OH	L 0–38		
October 8	Vanderbilt	Nippert Stadium; Cincinnati, OH	L 24–34	15,875	
October 15	at Rutgers	Rutgers Stadium; New Brunswick, NJ	L 9–14	37,220	
October 22	at Memphis	Liberty Bowl Memorial Stadium; Memphis, TN (rivalry)	L 3–26	17,543	
October 29	at East Carolina	Ficklen Memorial Stadium; Greenville, NC	L 21–35	33,287	
November 5	Troy State	Nippert Stadium; Cincinnati, OH	W 28–24		
November 12	at Wisconsin	Camp Randall Stadium; Madison, WI	L 7–38	75,245	
November 19	Tulsa	Nippert Stadium; Cincinnati, OH	W 28–13	18,162	
