= 1994 Tulane Green Wave football team =

American college football season

1994 Tulane Green Wave football
- Conference: Independent
- Record: 1–10
- Head coach: Buddy Teevens (3rd season)
- Offensive coordinator: Buddy Geis (1st season)
- Defensive coordinator: Vic Eumont (1st season)
- Home stadium: Louisiana Superdome

1994 NCAA Division I-A independents football records
	Conf.			Overall
Team	W	L	T	W		L		T
East Carolina		–		7	–	5	–	0
Louisville		–		6	–	5	–	0
Memphis		–		6	–	5	–	0
Southern Miss		–		6	–	5	–	0
Notre Dame		–		6	–	5	–	1
Army		–		4	–	7	–	0
Northeast Louisiana		–		3	–	8	–	0
Navy		–		3	–	8	–	0
Tulsa		–		3	–	8	–	0
Cincinnati		–		2	–	8	–	1
Tulane		–		1	–	10	–	0
Rankings from AP Poll

The 1994 Tulane Green Wave football team was an American football team that represented Tulane University during the 1994 NCAA Division I-A football season as an independent. In their third year under head coach Buddy Teevens, the team compiled a 1–10 record.

Tulane's season finale vs. LSU was the last meeting between the in-state rivals in New Orleans until 2007.

== Schedule ==
Date	Opponent	Site	Result	Attendance	Source
September 3	Southern Miss	Louisiana Superdome; New Orleans, LA (rivalry)	L 10–25	24,786	
September 10	at Rice	Rice Stadium; Houston, TX	W 15–13	15,400	
September 17	at No. 16 North Carolina	Kenan Memorial Stadium; Chapel Hill, NC	L 0–49	43,000	
September 24	at No. 11 Alabama	Legion Field; Birmingham, AL	L 10–20	81,421	
October 8	at Memphis	Liberty Bowl Memorial Stadium; Memphis, TN	L 0–13	19,400	
October 15	TCU	Louisiana Superdome; New Orleans, LA	L 28–30	23,561	
October 22	at Mississippi State	Scott Field; Starkville, MS	L 22–66	30,169	
October 29	at Maryland	Byrd Stadium; College Park, MD	L 10–38	24,456	
November 5	Navy	Louisiana Superdome; New Orleans, LA	L 15–17	20,603	
November 12	Ole Miss	Louisiana Superdome; New Orleans, LA (rivalry)	L 0–38	25,044	
November 19	LSU	Louisiana Superdome; New Orleans, LA (Battle for the Rag)	L 25–49	32,067	
Rankings from AP Poll released prior to the game

== Roster ==
1994 Tulane Green Wave football team roster
Players			Coaches
Offense: Pos. / # / Name / Class; FB / 33 / Jerald Sowell / So	Defense: Pos. / # / Name / Class	Special teams: Pos. / # / Name / Class	Head coach: Buddy Teevens; Coordinators/assistant coaches Legend: (C) Team captain; (S) Suspended; (I) Ineligible; Injured; Redshirt
