= 1994 Nebraska Cornhuskers football team =

American college football season

1994 Nebraska Cornhuskers football

Consensus national champion Big Eight champion Orange Bowl champion

Orange Bowl (BC NCG), W 24–17 vs. Miami (FL)
- Conference: Big Eight Conference

Ranking
- Coaches: No. 1
- AP: No. 1
- Record: 13–0 (7–0 Big Eight)
- Head coach: Tom Osborne (22nd season)
- Offensive scheme: I formation
- Defensive coordinator: Charlie McBride (14th season)
- Base defense: 4–3
- Home stadium: Memorial Stadium

1994 Big Eight Conference football standings
	Conf.					Overall
Team	W		L		T	W		L		T
No. 1 Nebraska $	7	–	0	–	0	13	–	0	–	0
No. 3 Colorado %	6	–	1	–	0	11	–	1	–	0
No. 19 Kansas State	5	–	2	–	0	9	–	3	–	0
Oklahoma	4	–	3	–	0	6	–	6	–	0
Kansas	3	–	4	–	0	6	–	5	–	0
Missouri	2	–	5	–	0	3	–	8	–	1
Oklahoma State	0	–	6	–	1	3	–	7	–	1
Iowa State	0	–	6	–	1	0	–	10	–	1
$ – Bowl Coalition representative as champion % – Bowl Coalition at-large representative; Rankings from AP Poll

The 1994 Nebraska Cornhuskers football team represented the University of Nebraska–Lincoln and was the national champion of the 1994 NCAA Division I-A football season. The team was coached by Tom Osborne and played their home games in Memorial Stadium in Lincoln, Nebraska. The Cornhuskers offense scored 459 points while the defense allowed 162 points.

== Before the season ==
There was much anticipation for the 1994 season. The 1993 Nebraska team compiled an 11–0 record in the regular season before narrowly losing to Florida State in the 1994 Orange Bowl on a last-second missed field goal. The 1994 offseason was dubbed "Unfinished Business" by the Huskers, in their quest to secure a national championship for the coming season.

Junior Tommie Frazier returned as the quarterback in Tom Osborne's vaunted option offense. Also returning were several key starters on defense that would prove to be a highly rated unit during the 1994 season.

== Schedule ==
Date	Time	Opponent	Rank	Site	TV	Result	Attendance	Source
August 28	1:00 pm	vs. No. 24 West Virginia*	No. 4	Giants Stadium; East Rutherford, NJ (Kickoff Classic)	ABC	W 31–0	58,233	
September 8	7:00 pm	at Texas Tech*	No. 1	Jones Stadium; Lubbock, TX	ESPN	W 42–16	32,768	
September 17	2:30 pm	No. 13 UCLA*	No. 2	Memorial Stadium; Lincoln, NE (College GameDay)	ABC	W 49–21	75,687	
September 24	1:00 pm	Pacific (CA)*	No. 2	Memorial Stadium; Lincoln, NE		W 70–21	75,273	
October 1	2:30 pm	Wyoming*	No. 2	Memorial Stadium; Lincoln, NE	PPV	W 42–32	75,333	
October 8	1:00 pm	Oklahoma State	No. 2	Memorial Stadium; Lincoln, NE		W 32–3	75,434	
October 15	11:00 am	at No. 16 Kansas State	No. 2	KSU Stadium; Manhattan, KS (rivalry)	ABC	W 17–6	42,817	
October 22	1:00 pm	at Missouri	No. 3	Faurot Field; Columbia, MO (rivalry)		W 42–7	50,537	
October 29	11:00 am	No. 2 Colorado^{†}	No. 3	Memorial Stadium; Lincoln, NE (rivalry, College GameDay)	ABC	W 24–7	76,131	
November 5	1:00 pm	Kansas	No. 1	Memorial Stadium; Lincoln, NE (rivalry)		W 45–17	75,543	
November 12	1:00 pm	at Iowa State	No. 1	Cyclone Stadium; Ames, IA (rivalry)		W 28–12	45,186	
November 25	2:30 pm	at Oklahoma	No. 1	Oklahoma Memorial Stadium; Norman, OK (rivalry)	ABC	W 13–3	70,216	
January 1, 1995	7:00 pm	vs. No. 3 Miami (FL)*	No. 1	Miami Orange Bowl; Miami, FL (Orange Bowl, rivalry)	NBC	W 24–17	81,753	
*Non-conference game; ^{†}Homecoming; Rankings from AP Poll released prior to the game; All times are in Central time

== Roster and coaching staff ==
1994 Nebraska Cornhuskers football team roster
Players
Coaches
Offense

Pos.	#	Name	Class
TE	88	Eric Alford	Sr
WB	31	Jacques Allen	Jr
OT	70	Eric Anderson	Fr
SE	7	Reggie Baul	Jr
IB	21	Damon Benning	So
QB	18	Brook Berringer	Jr
WB		Lance Brown	Fr
OL	62	Ted Butler	Fr
TE	90	Tim Carpenter	Fr
OT	61	Brady Caskey	Sr
SE	16	Kenny Cheatham	Fr
IB	26	Clinton Childs	Jr
QB		Monte Christo	Fr
FB		Josh Cobb	Fr
IB	17	Scott Davenport	Sr
SE	83	Aaron Davis	So
OT	75	Chris Dishman	So
OL	63	Constantine Dumitrescu	Fr
FB		Greg Ford	Fr
QB	15	Tommie Frazier	Jr
OL		Ben Gessford	Fr
TE	87	Mark Gilman	Jr
C	54	Aaron Graham	Jr
SE		Billy Haafke	Fr
SE		Ryan Held	Fr
C		Josh Heskew	Fr
TE	89	Erich Hohl	Sr
SE	5	Brendan Holbein	So
TE		Joe Horst	Fr
G		Matt Hoskinson	Fr
C	51	Bill Humphrey	Sr
TE	84	Sheldon Jackson	Fr
FB		Vershan Jackson	Fr
WB	33	Clester Johnson	Jr
FB	24	Brian Knuckles	Jr
SE		Jeff (Robert) Lake	Fr
G		Mike Lesser	Fr
SE	81	John Livingston	Jr
OL		Jason Luhr	Fr
FB	22	Jeff Makovicka	Jr
FB		Joel Makovicka	Fr
TE		Josh McGrane	Fr
OT		Kory Mikos	So
SE		Andy Miller	Fr
WB	27	Abdul Muhammad	Sr
FB	38	Chris Norris	Jr
OT		Brian Nunns	Jr
G	69	Steve Ott	Jr
IB	1	Lawrence Phillips	So
OT	73	Fred Pollack	Fr
SE	80	Brett Popplewell	Jr
G	65	Bryan Pruitt	Jr
WB	34	David Reddick	Fr
TE	86	Dorrick Roy	Fr
FB	40	Cory Schlesinger	Sr
OL		Anthony Schmode	Fr
FB	28	Brian Schuster	So
OL		Jeremy Shadrick	Fr
TE	85	Matt Shaw	Sr
IB	47	Marvin Sims	So
SE		Larry Smith	Fr
FB		Mike Smith	So
QB		Jay Staehr	Fr
G	66	Brenden Stai	Sr
FB		Chad Stanley	Jr
G		Dave Stramel	Fr
G	67	Aaron Taylor	Fr
OL		Ross Tessendorf	Fr
OT	77	Adam Treu	So
OL		Kyle Tully	Fr
QB	77	Matt Turman	So
IB	23	Todd Uhlir	Fr
G	59	Mike Van Cleave	Fr
WB	25	Jon Vedral	So
G	68	Steve Volin	Jr
C	53	Matt Vrzal	So
G	74	Brandt Wade	Fr
SE	3	Riley Washington	So
OT	72	Zach Wiegert	Sr
WB		Sean Wieting	Fr
G	76	Joel Wilks	Sr
G	64	Jon Zatechka	Fr
OT	56	Rob Zatechka	Sr

Defense

Pos.	#	Name	Class
ROV	11	Matt Aden	Fr
ROV		Dave Alderman	So
MLB	36	Leonard Alexander	Sr
OLB	23	Larry Arnold	So
FS		Dennis Bailey	So
LCB		Chad Blahak	So
DB	5	Michael Booker	So
FS		Chad Brouse	So
SLB	45	Clint Brown	Sr
LB		Darren Brummond	Fr
FS	17	Sedric Collins	Sr
MLB	46	Doug Colman	Jr
DT	99	Terry Connealy	Sr
DB	3	Tray Crayton	Fr
LCB	2	Leslie Dennis	Fr
SLB	4	Troy Dumas	Sr
MLB	41	Phil Ellis	Jr
SLB	24	Jason Fisher	Sr
DB	7	Jay Foreman	Fr
OLB		Sean Gard	Fr
OLB	58	Luther Hardin	Jr
OLB	86	Dwayne Harris	Sr
DB		Chris Herron	Fr
MLB	44	Jon Hesse	So
OLB	92	Jerad Higman	Sr
DT		Michael Hoffman	Fr
LB		Quint Hogrefe	Fr
WLB		Matt Hunting	Fr
DB		Jai Jackson	Fr
DT	96	Jason Jenkins	Jr
ROV		Jeremy Jensen	Jr
OLB	84	Donta Jones	Sr
LB		Charlie Leece	Fr
LB		Casey Macken	Fr
OLB	49	John Martin	Sr
DB	12	Octavious McFarlin	Fr
LCB	14	Barron Miles	Sr
OLB		Bryce Miller	So
ROV	10	Mike Minter	So
WLB		Ian Mitchell	So
OLB	42	Ed Morrow	So
ROV	29	Kareem Moss	Sr
DL	80	Erik Nelson	Fr
SLB	43	Sean Noster	Fr
DT	97	Jeff Ogard	So
OLB	98	Jeff Olsen	So
WLB	52	Aaron Penland	Jr
DT	57	Jason Pesterfield	Sr
DT	55	Christian Peter	Jr
DT	95	Jason Peter	Fr
ROV	39	Mike Roberts	So
LB	82	Mike Rucker	Fr
MLB	35	Jeff Sakalosky	Fr
DT	74	Scott Saltsman	So
RCB	37	Darren Schmadeke	Jr
MLB		Adam Skoda	Fr
MLB	31	Justin Stephens	Fr
WLB	32	Ed Stewart	Sr
RCB	16	Eric Stokes	So
WLB	91	Ryan Terwilliger	So
DB		Andy Thompson	Fr
LB	83	Travis Toline	Fr
DT	93	Jared Tomich	Jr
DT	94	Larry Townsend	So
FS	9	Tony Veland	Jr
DB		Eric Walther	Fr
ROV	28	Jamel Williams	So
RCB	8	Tyrone Williams	Jr
DT	68	Jason Wiltz	Fr
OLB		Shalis Winder	Fr
OLB	85	Grant Wistrom	Fr
RCB	22	Trampis Wrice	So
FS		Chad Young	Jr

Special teams

Pos.	#	Name	Class
P/PK	6	Darin Erstad	So
P	19	Jesse Kosch	Fr
P/PK		Bill Lafleur	Fr
P/PK		Brian Morro	Fr
PK	13	Ted Retzlaff	Fr
PK	12	Tom Sieler	Sr

Head coach

- Tom Osborne
  22nd season
  31st year at Nebraska
  Alma mater: Hastings College

Coordinators/assistant coaches

- Charlie McBride
  14th season as DC/DL coach
  18th year at Nebraska
  Alma mater: Colorado
- Turner Gill
  3rd season as QB coach
  3rd year at Nebraska
  Alma mater: Nebraska
- Kevin Steele
  6th season as LB coach
  6th year at Nebraska
  Alma mater: Tennessee
- Ron Brown
  8th season as WR/TE coach
  8th year at Nebraska
  Alma mater: Brown
- Dan Young
  12th season as OL/K coach
  12th year at Nebraska
  Alma mater: Reed
- Milt Tenopir
  21st season as OL coach
  21st year at Nebraska
  Alma mater: Sterling
- Tony Samuel
  9th season as OLB coach
  9th year at Nebraska
  Alma mater: Nebraska
- George Darlington
  DB coach
  22nd year at Nebraska
  Alma mater: Rutgers
- Frank Solich
  12th season as RB coach
  16th year at Nebraska
  Alma mater: Nebraska
- Boyd Epley
  26th season as S&C coach
  26th year at Nebraska
  Alma mater: Nebraska

Legend

- (C) Team captain
- (S) Suspended
- (I) Ineligible
- Injured
- Redshirt

Roster
Last update: January 17, 2011

=== Depth chart ===
Defense

FS
Tony Veland
Eric Stokes
Sedric Collins

WILL	MIKE	SAM
Ed Stewart	Phil Ellis; Doug Colman	Troy Dumas
Ryan Terwilliger	Jon Hesse	Clint Brown
Jamel Williams	Lenord Alexander	Larry Arnold

ROVER
Kareem Moss
Octavious McFarlin
Jamel Williams

CB
Baron Miles
Darren Schmadeke
Trampis Wrice

DE	DT	DT	DE
Donta Jones	Terry Connealy	Christian Peter	Dwayne Harris
Grant Wistrom	Jason Pesterfield	Scott Saltsman	Jared Tomich
Jerad Higman	Jason Peter	Larry Townsend	Luther Hardin

CB
Tyrone Williams
Leslie Dennis
Michael Booker

Offense

WR
Abdul Muhammad
Clestor Johnson
Jon Vedral

LT	LG	C	RG	RT
Rob Zatechka	Brenden Stai	Aaron Graham	Joel Wilks	Zach Wiegert
Chris Dishman	Aaron Taylor	Bill Humphrey	Steve Ott	Eric Anderson
Kory Mikos	Jon Zatechka	Matt Vrzal	Steve Volin	Adam Treu

TE
Eric Alford
Mark Gilman
Matt Shaw
Tim Carpenter

WR
Reggie Baul
Brandon Holbein
Riley Washington

QB
Tommie Frazier
Brook Berringer
Matt Turman
⋅

RB
Lawrence Phillips
Clinton Childs
Damon Benning
Todd Uhlir

FB
Corey Schlesinger
Jeff Mackovicka
Brian Schuster

Special teams
PK Tom Sieler
P Darin Erstad

== Game summaries ==
=== West Virginia ===
Nebraska vs West Virginia [box score]

Team	1	2	3	4	Total
• Nebraska	3	21	0	7	31
West Virginia	0	0	0	0	0

- Date: August 28
- Location: Giants Stadium, East Rutherford, New Jersey
- Game attendance: 58,233

The 1994 season started for the No. 4 Cornhuskers with a 31–0 win over No. 24 West Virginia in the Kickoff Classic. The game pitted two teams that had posted undefeated regular-season records in 1993. Quarterback Tommie Frazier was the game's MVP, rushing for 130 yards on 12 carries, including touchdown runs of 25, 27, and 42 yards. He also completed 8 of 16 passes for 100 yards and another touchdown. I-back Lawrence Phillips also ran 126 yards on 24 carries. In all, Nebraska gained 368 rushing yards and 468 total. The Nebraska defense dominated the Mountaineers, registering eight quarterback sacks and holding West Virginia to 8 yards rushing and 89 total yards. Todd Sauerbrun set a record for West Virginia with a 90-yard punt and averaged 60.1 yards on nine punts. The victory marked Nebraska's first shutout victory in two years. It was also Nebraska's first shutout victory against a ranked non-conference opponent since a 20–0 win over No. 19 Baylor in Lincoln 1939, and the first ever such win in a game played outside of Lincoln. The win vaulted Nebraska to No. 1 in the polls.

=== Texas Tech ===
Nebraska at Texas Tech [box score]

Team	1	2	3	4	Total
• Nebraska	7	7	14	14	42
Texas Tech	0	3	6	7	16

- Date: September 8
- Location: Clifford B. and Audrey Jones Stadium, Lubbock, Texas
- Game attendance: 32,768

Next up was a road victory that saw the Huskers cruise past the Texas Tech Red Raiders, 42–16, which remarkably saw the Huskers drop to #2 in the polls. Unfortunately, this victory came at a cost, as safety Mike Minter suffered a season-ending knee injury.

=== UCLA ===
UCLA at Nebraska [box score]

Team	1	2	3	4	Total
UCLA	0	7	7	7	21
• Nebraska	12	16	7	14	49

- Date: September 17
- Location: Memorial Stadium, Lincoln, Nebraska
- Game attendance: 75,687

=== Pacific ===
Pacific at Nebraska [box score]

Team	1	2	3	4	Total
Pacific	0	0	14	7	21
• Nebraska	28	21	14	7	70

- Date: September 24
- Location: Memorial Stadium, Lincoln, Nebraska
- Game attendance: 75,273

The next two weeks first saw a tough match-up, where the Huskers would dominate #13-ranked UCLA in Memorial Stadium, followed by a blowout against Pacific. Shortly after this victory, the 1994 season got a lot more interesting when Nebraska's field general Tommie Frazier was sidelined by a blood clot in his right knee.

=== Wyoming ===
Wyoming at Nebraska [box score]

Team	1	2	3	4	Total
Wyoming	14	7	3	8	32
• Nebraska	0	14	21	7	42

- Date: October 1
- Location: Memorial Stadium, Lincoln, Nebraska
- Game attendance: 75,333

=== Oklahoma State ===
Oklahoma State at Nebraska [box score]

Team	1	2	3	4	Total
Oklahoma State	3	0	0	0	3
• Nebraska	0	9	16	7	32

- Date: October 8
- Location: Memorial Stadium, Lincoln, Nebraska
- Game attendance: 75,434

=== Kansas State ===
Nebraska at Kansas State [box score]

Team	1	2	3	4	Total
• Nebraska	7	0	0	10	17
Kansas State	0	6	0	0	6

- Date: October 15
- Location: KSU Stadium, Manhattan, Kansas
- Game attendance: 42,817

With Frazier sidelined, junior Brook Berringer answered the call to run Osborne's offense. Berringer, a pro-style QB from Goodland, Kansas, came off the bench and performed at his best in two straight victories against Wyoming and Oklahoma State, even at times with a partially collapsed lung. When it became too much for Berringer, walk-on QB Matt Turman stepped up to lead the Cornhuskers against Okie State and in a tough road game that pitched the Huskers against conference foe and neighbor Kansas State. This game proved to be a defensive battle, which saw the Huskers walk away with a 17–6 victory against the #16 Wildcats.

=== Missouri ===
Nebraska at Missouri [box score]

Team	1	2	3	4	Total
• Nebraska	0	14	14	14	42
Missouri	0	0	0	7	7

- Date: October 22
- Location: Faurot Field, Columbia, Missouri
- Game attendance: 50,537

=== Colorado ===
Colorado at Nebraska [box score]

Team	1	2	3	4	Total
Colorado	0	0	7	0	7
• Nebraska	7	10	7	0	24

- Date: October 29
- Location: Memorial Stadium, Lincoln, Nebraska
- Game attendance: 76,131

Nebraska's homecoming game and 200th consecutive home sell out.

=== Kansas ===
Kansas at Nebraska [box score]

Team	1	2	3	4	Total
Kansas	3	7	0	7	17
• Nebraska	24	14	7	0	45

- Date: November 5
- Location: Memorial Stadium, Lincoln, Nebraska
- Game attendance: 75,543

=== Iowa State ===
Nebraska at Iowa State [box score]

Team	1	2	3	4	Total
• Nebraska	7	7	0	14	28
Iowa State	0	6	6	0	12

- Date: November 12
- Location: Cyclone Stadium, Ames, Iowa
- Game attendance: 45,186

=== Oklahoma ===
Nebraska at Oklahoma [box score]

Team	1	2	3	4	Total
• Nebraska	0	3	3	7	13
Oklahoma	0	3	0	0	3

- Date: November 25
- Location: Oklahoma Memorial Stadium, Norman, Oklahoma
- Game attendance: 70,216

The final five regular season games saw Nebraska beat #2 Colorado, where the defense shut down eventual Heisman winner Rashaan Salaam. Only Oklahoma provided any resistance for the Huskers, who escaped with a 13–3 victory in Norman, and another Big Eight Conference Championship.

=== Miami ===
Nebraska vs Miami [box score]

Team	1	2	3	4	Total
• Nebraska	0	7	2	15	24
Miami	10	0	7	0	17

- Date: January 1
- Location: Miami Orange Bowl, Miami
- Game attendance: 81,753

Scoring summary
1	7:54	MIA	Dane Prewitt 44-yard field goal	MIA 3–0
1	0:04	MIA	Trent Jones 35-yard pass from Frank Costa (Dane Prewitt kick)	MIA 10–0
2	7:54	NEB	Mark Gilman 19-yard pass from Brook Berringer (Tom Sieler kick)	MIA 10–7
3	13:19	MIA	Jonathan Harris 44-yard pass from Frank Costa (Dane Prewitt kick)	MIA 17–7
3	11:35	NEB	Team Safety	MIA 17–9
4	7:38	NEB	Cory Schlesinger 15-yard run (Eric Alford 2-pt reception)	Tied 17–17
4	2:46	NEB	Cory Schlesinger 14-yard run (Tom Sieler kick)	NEB 24–17

Nebraska was #1 in the nation, and found themselves pitted against #3 Miami in the Orange Bowl, a setting very familiar to Tom Osborne and his Husker players. Osborne had been in this very stadium on three separate occasions playing for a national championship, and came away empty-handed each time, losing the previous year against Bobby Bowden's Seminoles of Florida State, to the Miami Hurricanes in the legendary 1984 Orange Bowl by the score of 31–30, and to the #1 Clemson Tigers in the 1982 Orange Bowl, a night game in which Nebraska entered #4 where the #2 and #3 teams lost their bowl games earlier in the day.

But it would be much different this year. Frazier had returned from his injury, and Nebraska would not back down, even after trailing 10–7 at halftime and 17–7 with less than two minutes to go in the third quarter.

During his halftime speech, Coach Osborne had predicted the eventual meltdown of Miami late in the game. He told his players that if they maintained their composure, that Miami would slip up and earn a costly penalty. Osborne's prediction rang true, and the physically dominant Huskers scored 15 unanswered points in the 4th quarter on two key TD runs by FB Corey Schlesinger to earn Tom Osborne his first national title, by the score of 24–17.

== Rankings ==
Ranking movements Legend: ██ Increase in ranking ██ Decrease in ranking
	Week																
Poll	Pre	1	2	3	4	5	6	7	8	9	10	11	12	13	14	15	Final
AP	4	2	1	2	2	2	2	2	3	3	1	1	1	1	1	1	1
Coaches																	1

== After the season ==
The season saw Nebraska lead the nation in rushing, with Lawrence Phillips rushing for 1,722 yards and finishing 8th in Heisman voting. The offensive line, was known as "The Pipeline" and included Outland Trophy winner and All-American Zach Wiegert at tackle, fellow All-American Brendan Stai at guard, along with Rob Zatechka, Joel Wilks, and Aaron Graham. The vaunted 4–3 defense, led by All-American linebacker Ed Stewart, limited conference opponents to a mere 55 points.

The Huskers were treated to a warm welcome, despite the freezing temperatures, when they returned to Lincoln as National Champions. An estimated 15,000 fans were on hand at the Lincoln Airport to welcome home their Big Red heroes.

=== Awards ===
Award	Name(s)
Outland Trophy	Zach Wiegert
UPI Lineman of the Year	Zach Wiegert
All-America 1st team	Terry Connealy, Donta Jones, Brenden Stai, Ed Stewart, Zach Wiegert, Rob Zatechka
All-America 2nd team	Lawrence Phillips
All-America 3rd team	Barron Miles
Big Eight Coach of the Year	Tom Osborne
Big Eight Defensive Player of the Year	Ed Stewart
Big Eight Defensive Newcomer of the Year	Grant Wistrom
Big Eight Male Athlete of the Year	Rob Zatechka
All-Big Eight 1st team	Troy Dumas, Aaron Graham, Donta Jones, Lawrence Phillips, Barron Miles, Brenden Stai, Ed Stewart, Zach Wiegert, Tyrone Williams
All-Big Eight 2nd team	Brook Berringer, Terry Connealy, Dwayne Harris, Kareem Moss, Christian Peter, Rob Zatechka
All-Big Eight honorable mention	Eric Alford, Reggie Baul, Darin Erstad, Abdul Muhammad, Cory Schlesinger

=== NFL and pro players ===
The following Nebraska players who participated in the 1994 season later moved on to the next level and joined a professional or semi-pro team as draftees or free agents.

Name	Team
Eric Anderson	Amsterdam Admirals
Mike Anderson	Amsterdam Admirals
Michael Booker	Atlanta Falcons
Doug Colman	New York Giants
Chris Dishman	Arizona Cardinals
Troy Dumas	Kansas City Chiefs
Jay Foreman	Buffalo Bills
Tommie Frazier	Montreal Alouettes
Aaron Graham	Arizona Cardinals
Jon Hesse	Green Bay Packers
Sheldon Jackson	Buffalo Bills
Vershan Jackson	Kansas City Chiefs
Donta Jones	Pittsburgh Steelers
Bill Lafleur	Barcelona Dragons
Joel Makovicka	Arizona Cardinals
Barron Miles	Pittsburgh Steelers
Mike Minter	Carolina Panthers
Kareem Moss	BC Lions
Christian Peter	New York Giants
Jason Peter	Carolina Panthers
Lawrence Phillips	St. Louis Rams
Mike Rucker	Carolina Panthers
Cory Schlesinger	Detroit Lions
Brenden Stai	Pittsburgh Steelers
Ed Stewart	Carolina Panthers
Eric Stokes	Seattle Seahawks
Jared Tomich	New Orleans Saints
Larry Townsend	Berlin Thunder
Adam Treu	Oakland Raiders
Tony Veland	Denver Broncos
Zach Wiegert	St. Louis Rams
Jamel Williams	Washington Redskins
Tyrone Williams	Green Bay Packers
Jason Wiltz	New York Jets
Grant Wistrom	St. Louis Rams
Jon Zatechka	Berlin Thunder
Rob Zatechka	New York Giants

Additionally, starting junior punter Darin Erstad also played baseball for the University of Nebraska, and was selected as a First Team All-American by Collegiate Baseball. He chose to forego his college career to enter the MLB draft and was selected as the first pick overall in the 1995 Major League Baseball draft. He would go on to have a distinguished career in Major League Baseball (particularly with the Anaheim Angels). Erstad would later be the head coach of the Nebraska Cornhuskers baseball from 2012 to 2019.
