= 1994 Navy Midshipmen football team =

American college football season

1994 Navy Midshipmen football
- Conference: Independent
- Record: 3–8
- Head coach: George Chaump (5th season)
- Offensive coordinator: Greg Briner (2nd season; fired after game 1)
- Defensive coordinator: Richard Bell (1st season)
- MVP: Damon Dixon
- Captains: Chris Hart; Jim Kubiak
- Home stadium: Navy–Marine Corps Memorial Stadium

1994 NCAA Division I-A independents football records
	Conf.			Overall
Team	W	L	T	W		L		T
East Carolina		–		7	–	5	–	0
Louisville		–		6	–	5	–	0
Memphis		–		6	–	5	–	0
Southern Miss		–		6	–	5	–	0
Notre Dame		–		6	–	5	–	1
Army		–		4	–	7	–	0
Northeast Louisiana		–		3	–	8	–	0
Navy		–		3	–	8	–	0
Tulsa		–		3	–	8	–	0
Cincinnati		–		2	–	8	–	1
Tulane		–		1	–	10	–	0
Rankings from AP Poll

The 1994 Navy Midshipmen football team represented the United States Naval Academy (USNA) as an independent during the 1994 NCAA Division I-A football season. The team was led by fifth-year head coach George Chaump.

Offensive coordinator Greg Briner, who was hired prior to the 1993 season, was fired after a 14–56 loss to San Diego State in week 1.

== Schedule ==
Date	Time	Opponent	Site	TV	Result	Attendance	Source
September 3		at San Diego State	Jack Murphy Stadium; San Diego, CA		L 14–56	25,248	
September 10	7:00 p.m.	Virginia	Navy–Marine Corps Memorial Stadium; Annapolis, MD		L 10–47	25,463	
September 17		at Bowling Green	Doyt Perry Stadium; Bowling Green, OH		L 21–59		
October 1		Duke	Navy–Marine Corps Memorial Stadium; Annapolis, MD		L 14–47	25,579	
October 8		at Air Force	Falcon Stadium; Colorado Springs, CO (Commander-in-Chief's Trophy)		L 21–43		
October 15		Lafayette	Navy–Marine Corps Memorial Stadium; Annapolis, MD		W 7–0	20,511	
October 22		Louisville^{†}	Navy–Marine Corps Memorial Stadium; Annapolis, MD		L 14–35	38,156	
October 29	2:30 p.m.	at Notre Dame	Notre Dame Stadium; Notre Dame, IN (rivalry)	NBC	L 21–58	59,075	
November 5		at Tulane	Louisiana Superdome; New Orleans, LA		W 17–15	20,603	
November 19		Rice	Navy–Marine Corps Memorial Stadium; Annapolis, MD		W 29–17		
December 3		vs. Army	Veterans Stadium; Philadelphia, PA (Army–Navy Game)		L 20–22		
^{†}Homecoming

== Roster ==
1994 Navy Midshipmen football team roster
Players
Coaches
Offense

Pos.	#	Name	Class
WR		Damon Dixon	Sr
OL		Alex Domino
RB		Robbie Edwards
WR		Greg Emery
QB		Ben Fay
TE		Brian Grana
WR		Astor Heaven
TE		Kevin Hickman	Sr
OL		Erasto Jackson
RB		Mike Jefferson	Sr
QB		Jim Kubiak	Sr
RB		Pat McGrew
TE		Jim Mill
OL		Bruce Minamyer
RB		Omar Nelson
WR		Quaye Quartey
WR	2	Matt Scornavacchi
WR		Ross Scott
OL		Garrett Smith
RB		Will Smith
QB		Tony Solliday
OL		Dean Wakeham
RB		Monty Williams

Defense

Pos.	#	Name	Class
DB		Gervy Alota
LB		Travis Cooley
LB		Clint Bruce
DB		Keith Galloway
DB		Robert Green
LB		Shane Halloran
DL		Mark Hammond
LB		Fernando Harris
DB		Chris Hart
LB		Mark Love
LB		J.D. McBryde	Jr
DL		Tom Neville
DE	57	Andy Person	Jr
DL		Tom Poulter
DL		Travis Salley
DB		Joe Speed
DB		Andy Thompson
DL		Jake Zweig
DE	90	Colin Echols

Special teams

Pos.	#	Name	Class
K		Ryan Bucchianeri	So

Head coach

- George Chaump

Coordinators/assistant coaches

Legend

- (C) Team captain
- (S) Suspended
- (I) Ineligible
- Injured
- Redshirt
