= 1994 Copper Bowl =

1994 Weiser Lock Copper Bowl
- 6th Copper Bowl
BYU Cougars	Oklahoma Sooners
(9–3)	(6–5)
WAC	Big Eight
31	6
Head coach: LaVell Edwards	Head coach: Gary Gibbs
AP / Coaches / BC; 22 / 19 / 21
	1	2	3	4	Total
BYU	7	10	7	7	31
Oklahoma	0	0	0	6	6
- Date: December 29, 1994
- Season: 1994
- Stadium: Arizona Stadium
- Location: Tucson, Arizona
- Referee: Larry Fisher (SWC)

United States TV coverage
- Network: ESPN
- Announcers: Ron Franklin (Play by Play); Mike Gottfried (Color); Mike Adamle (Sideline)

The 1994 Copper Bowl, the sixth edition of the Copper Bowl, featured the BYU Cougars, and the Oklahoma Sooners.

BYU quarterback John Walsh threw a 7-yard touchdown pass to Bryce Doman as the BYU Cougars led 7–0 after the 1st quarter. In the second quarter, David Lauder hit a 22-yard field goal bringing the lead to 10–0. Walsh threw a 25-yard touchdown pass to Mike Johnston to give BYU a 17–0 lead at halftime.

In the third quarter, Walsh and Johnston connected for the second time on a 4-yard scoring pass giving the Cougars a 24–0 lead. Oklahoma scored its only points of the game on a 2-yard Moore touchdown run making it 24–6. Walsh's 28-yard touchdown pass to Doman made the final score BYU 31, Oklahoma 6.

In total, Walsh completed 31 of 45 passes for 454 yards and four touchdowns.
