= 1994 Southern Miss Golden Eagles football team =

American college football season

1994 Southern Miss Golden Eagles football
- Conference: Independent
- Record: 6–5
- Head coach: Jeff Bower (4th season)
- Offensive coordinator: Norman Joseph (1st season)
- Offensive scheme: Multiple
- Defensive coordinator: John Thompson (3rd season)
- Base defense: Multiple
- Home stadium: M. M. Roberts Stadium

1994 NCAA Division I-A independents football records
	Conf.			Overall
Team	W	L	T	W		L		T
East Carolina		–		7	–	5	–	0
Louisville		–		6	–	5	–	0
Memphis		–		6	–	5	–	0
Southern Miss		–		6	–	5	–	0
Notre Dame		–		6	–	5	–	1
Army		–		4	–	7	–	0
Northeast Louisiana		–		3	–	8	–	0
Navy		–		3	–	8	–	0
Tulsa		–		3	–	8	–	0
Cincinnati		–		2	–	8	–	1
Tulane		–		1	–	10	–	0
Rankings from AP Poll

The 1994 Southern Miss Golden Eagles football team was an American football team that represented the University of Southern Mississippi as an independent during the 1994 NCAA Division I-A football season. In their fourth year under head coach Jeff Bower, the team compiled a 6–5 record.

== Schedule ==
Date	Opponent	Site	Result	Attendance	Source
September 3	at Tulane	Louisiana Superdome; New Orleans, LA (rivalry)	W 25–10	24,786	
September 10	No. 21 Virginia Tech	M. M. Roberts Stadium; Hattiesburg, MS	L 14–24	17,381	
September 17	Memphis	M. M. Roberts Stadium; Hattiesburg, MS (Black and Blue Bowl)	W 20–3	17,563	
September 24	at No. 13 Texas A&M	Kyle Field; College Station, TX	L 17–41	56,006	
October 1	at East Carolina	Ficklen Memorial Stadium; Greenville, NC	L 10–31	32,867	
October 8	at No. 11 Alabama	Bryant–Denny Stadium; Tuscaloosa, AL	L 6–14	70,123	
October 15	Southwestern Louisiana	M. M. Roberts Stadium; Hattiesburg, MS	W 43–20	14,592	
October 22	Samford^{†}	M. M. Roberts Stadium; Hattiesburg, MS	W 59–16	15,514	
October 29	Tulsa	M. M. Roberts Stadium; Hattiesburg, MS	W 47–29	13,473–13,493	
November 5	at No. 4 Florida	Ben Hill Griffin Stadium; Gainesville, FL	L 17–55	85,448	
November 12	at LSU	Tiger Stadium; Baton Rouge, LA	W 20–18	51,710	
^{†}Homecoming; Rankings from AP Poll released prior to the game
