= 1994 Notre Dame Fighting Irish football team =

American college football season

1994 Notre Dame Fighting Irish football

Fiesta Bowl, L 24–41 vs. Colorado
- Conference: Independent
- Record: 6–5–1
- Head coach: Lou Holtz (9th season)
- Offensive coordinator: Dave Roberts (1st season)
- Offensive scheme: Multiple I formation
- Defensive coordinator: Bob Davie (1st season)
- Base defense: 4–3
- MVP: Derrick Mayes
- Captains: Lee Becton; Justin Goheen; Brian Hamilton; Ryan Leahy
- Home stadium: Notre Dame Stadium

1994 NCAA Division I-A independents football records
	Conf.			Overall
Team	W	L	T	W		L		T
East Carolina		–		7	–	5	–	0
Louisville		–		6	–	5	–	0
Memphis		–		6	–	5	–	0
Southern Miss		–		6	–	5	–	0
Notre Dame		–		6	–	5	–	1
Army		–		4	–	7	–	0
Northeast Louisiana		–		3	–	8	–	0
Navy		–		3	–	8	–	0
Tulsa		–		3	–	8	–	0
Cincinnati		–		2	–	8	–	1
Tulane		–		1	–	10	–	0
Rankings from AP Poll

The 1994 Notre Dame Fighting Irish football team was an American football team that represented the University of Notre Dame as an independent during the 1994 NCAA Division I-A football season. In their ninth year under head coach Lou Holtz, the Irish compiled a 6–5–1 record, outscored opponents by a total of 318 to 239, and were unranked in the final AP and UPI polls. They were ranked No. 3 in the preseason AP poll, but lost to No. 6 Michigan, unranked Boston College and BYU, and No. 8 Florida State. They concluded the season with a loss to No. 4 Colorado in the Fiesta Bowl.

Cornerback Bobby Taylor was a consensus first-team pick on the 1994 All-America college football team. The team's statistical leaders included quarterback Ron Powlus (1,729 passing yards), running back Randy Kinder (702 rushing yards), split end Derrick Mayes (47 receptions for 847 yards, 66 points scored), and defensive back Brian Magee (81 tackles).

The team played its home games at Notre Dame Stadium in Notre Dame, Indiana.

== Schedule ==
Date	Time	Opponent	Rank	Site	TV	Result	Attendance	Source
September 3	8:00 p.m.	vs. Northwestern	No. 3	Soldier Field; Chicago, IL (rivalry)	ABC	W 42–15	66,946	
September 10	2:30 p.m.	No. 6 Michigan	No. 3	Notre Dame Stadium; Notre Dame, IN (rivalry, College GameDay)	NBC	L 24–26	59,075	
September 17	3:30 p.m.	at Michigan State	No. 8	Spartan Stadium; East Lansing, MI (rivalry)	ABC	W 21–20	74,183	
September 24	2:30 p.m.	Purdue	No. 9	Notre Dame Stadium; Notre Dame, IN (rivalry)	NBC	W 39–21	59,075	
October 1	2:30 p.m.	Stanford	No. 8	Notre Dame Stadium; Notre Dame, IN (rivalry)	NBC	W 34–15	59,075	
October 8	12:00 p.m.	at Boston College	No. 8	Alumni Stadium; Chestnut Hill, MA (Holy War)	ABC	L 11–30	44,500	
October 15	2:30 p.m.	BYU	No. 17	Notre Dame Stadium; Notre Dame, IN	NBC	L 14–21	59,075	
October 29	2:30 p.m.	Navy		Notre Dame Stadium; Notre Dame, IN (rivalry)	NBC	W 58–21	59,075	
November 12	12:00 p.m.	vs. No. 8 Florida State		Florida Citrus Bowl; Orlando, FL (rivalry)	ABC	L 16–23	72,868	
November 19	1:30 p.m.	Air Force		Notre Dame Stadium; South Bend, IN (rivalry)	NBC	W 42–30	59,075	
November 26	8:00 p.m.	at No. 17 USC		Los Angeles Memorial Coliseum; Los Angeles, CA (rivalry)	ABC	T 17–17	90,217	
January 2, 1995	4:30 p.m.	vs. No. 4 Colorado		Sun Devil Stadium; Tempe, AZ (Fiesta Bowl)	NBC	L 24–41	73,968	
Rankings from AP Poll released prior to the game; All times are in Eastern time

== Game summaries ==
=== Michigan ===
Michigan at Notre Dame

Team	1	2	3	4	Total
• No. 6 Wolverines	7	3	10	6	26
No. 3 Fighting Irish	10	0	7	7	24

- Date: September 10
- Location: Notre Dame Stadium, South Bend, Indiana
- Game attendance: 59,075
- Television network: NBC

Scoring summary
Q1		ND	Schroffner 32 yard field goal	ND 3–0
Q1		MICH	Biakabutuka 9 yard run (Hamilton kick)	MICH 7–3
Q1		ND	Becton 1 yard pass from Powlus (Schroffner kick)	ND 10–7
Q2		MICH	Hamilton 32 yard field goal	Tie 10–10
Q3		ND	Edwards 8 yard run (Schroffner kick)	ND 17–10
Q3		MICH	Riemersma 3 yard pass from Collins (Hamilton kick)	Tie 17–17
Q3		MICH	Hamilton 35 yard field goal	MICH 20–17
Q4		MICH	Hamilton 32 yard field goal	MICH 23–17
Q4	:52	ND	Mayes 7 yard pass from Powlus (Schroffner kick)	ND 24–23
Q4	:02	MICH	Hamilton 42 yard field goal	MICH 26–24

== Roster ==
1994 Notre Dame Fighting Irish football team roster
Players
Coaches
Offense

Pos.	#	Name	Class
TE	98	Pete Chryplewicz	Jr
FB	44	Marc Edwards	So
RB	31	Robert Farmer	So
WR	1	Derrick Mayes	Jr
TE	80	Oscar McBride	Sr
QB	3	Ron Powlus	So
RB	34	Ray Zellars	Sr
C	77	Dusty Zeigler	Jr

Defense

Pos.	#	Name	Class
LB	13	Bertrand Berry	So
LB	6	Lyron Cobbins	So
DT	93	Paul Grasmanis	Jr
CB	15	Allen Rossum	Fr
CB	21	Bobby Taylor	Jr
CB	22	Shawn Wooden	Jr
DE	48	Renaldo Wynn	Jr

Special teams

Pos.	#	Name	Class

Head coach

- Lou Holtz

Coordinators/assistant coaches

Legend

- (C) Team captain
- (S) Suspended
- (I) Ineligible
- Injured
- Redshirt

== Awards and honors ==
Cornerback Bobby Taylor was a consensus first-team pick on the 1994 All-America college football team.

Split end Derrick Mayes was selected by his teammates as the team's most valuable player.

== 1995 NFL draft ==
The following Notre Dame players were selectedin the 1995 NFL draft.

Player	Position	Round	Pick	NFL club
Ray Zellars	Running back	2	44	New Orleans Saints
Bobby Taylor	Cornerback	2	50	Philadelphia Eagles
Oliver Gibson	Defensive tackle	4	120	Pittsburgh Steelers
Mike Miller	Wide receiver	5	147	Cleveland Browns
Travis Davis	Safety	5	147	New Orleans Saints
