= 1994 Tulsa Golden Hurricane football team =

American college football season

1994 Tulsa Golden Hurricane football
- Conference: Independent
- Record: 3–8
- Head coach: David Rader (7th season)
- Offensive coordinator: Mark Thomas (2nd season)
- Defensive coordinator: Mike Knoll (6th season)
- Home stadium: Skelly Stadium

1994 NCAA Division I-A independents football records
	Conf.			Overall
Team	W	L	T	W		L		T
East Carolina		–		7	–	5	–	0
Louisville		–		6	–	5	–	0
Memphis		–		6	–	5	–	0
Southern Miss		–		6	–	5	–	0
Notre Dame		–		6	–	5	–	1
Army		–		4	–	7	–	0
Northeast Louisiana		–		3	–	8	–	0
Navy		–		3	–	8	–	0
Tulsa		–		3	–	8	–	0
Cincinnati		–		2	–	8	–	1
Tulane		–		1	–	10	–	0
Rankings from AP Poll

The 1994 Tulsa Golden Hurricane football team represented the University of Tulsa during the 1994 NCAA Division I-A football season. In their seventh year under head coach David Rader, the Golden Hurricane compiled a 3–8 record. The team's statistical leaders included quarterback John Fitzgerald with 1,409 passing yards, Solomon White with 1,003 rushing yards, and Wes Caswell with 893 receiving yards.

== Schedule ==
Date	Opponent	Site	Result	Attendance	Source
September 3	at Missouri	Faurot Field; Columbia, MO	W 20–17	55,263	
September 10	at Memphis	Skelly Stadium; Tulsa, OK	L 18–42	21,324	
September 17	at Wyoming	War Memorial Stadium; Laramie, WY	L 7–17	21,547	
September 24	at Oklahoma State	Lewis Field; Stillwater, OK (rivalry)	L 10–17	46,840	
October 8	UTEP	Skelly Stadium; Tulsa, OK	L 17–24	17,127	
October 15	UNLV	Skelly Stadium; Tulsa, OK	W 44–22	16,875	
October 22	East Carolina^{†}	Skelly Stadium; Tulsa, OK	L 21–28	24,811	
October 29	at Southern Miss	M. M. Roberts Stadium; Hattiesburg, MS	L 29–47	13,473–13,493	
November 12	Southwest Missouri State	Skelly Stadium; Tulsa, OK	W 38–28	17,349	
November 19	at Cincinnati	Nippert Stadium; Cincinnati, OH	L 13–28	18,162	
November 26	at Louisville	Cardinal Stadium; Louisville, KY	L 27–34	35,655	
^{†}Homecoming
