= 1994 Louisville Cardinals football team =

American college football season

1994 Louisville Cardinals football
- Conference: Independent
- Record: 6–5
- Head coach: Howard Schnellenberger (10th season)
- Offensive coordinator: Gary Nord (6th season)
- Defensive coordinator: Ty Smith (4th season)
- Home stadium: Cardinal Stadium

1994 NCAA Division I-A independents football records
| | Conf. | | | Overall |
| Team | W | L | T | W | | L | | T |
|---|---|---|---|---|---|---|---|---|
| East Carolina | | – | | 7 | – | 5 | – | 0 |
| Louisville | | – | | 6 | – | 5 | – | 0 |
| Memphis | | – | | 6 | – | 5 | – | 0 |
| Southern Miss | | – | | 6 | – | 5 | – | 0 |
| Notre Dame | | – | | 6 | – | 5 | – | 1 |
| Army | | – | | 4 | – | 7 | – | 0 |
| Northeast Louisiana | | – | | 3 | – | 8 | – | 0 |
| Navy | | – | | 3 | – | 8 | – | 0 |
| Tulsa | | – | | 3 | – | 8 | – | 0 |
| Cincinnati | | – | | 2 | – | 8 | – | 1 |
| Tulane | | – | | 1 | – | 10 | – | 0 |
Rankings from AP Poll

The 1994 Louisville Cardinals football team represented the University of Louisville as an independent during the 1994 NCAA Division I-A football season. Led by Howard Schnellenberger in his tenth and final season as head coach, the Cardinals compiled a record of 6–5. The team played home games in Cardinal Stadium in Louisville, Kentucky.

== Schedule ==
| Date | Opponent | Site | Result | Attendance | Source |
|---|---|---|---|---|---|
| September 3 | at Kentucky | Commonwealth Stadium; Lexington, KY (Governor's Cup) | L 14–20 | 59,162 | |
| September 10 | at No. 20 Texas | Texas Memorial Stadium; Austin, TX | L 16–30 | 64,627 | |
| September 17 | at Arizona State | Sun Devil Stadium; Tempe, AZ | W 25–22 | 45,411 | |
| October 1 | Pittsburgh | Cardinal Stadium; Louisville, KY | W 33–29 | 38,621 | |
| October 8 | No. 18 NC State^{†} | Cardinal Stadium; Louisville, KY | W 35–14 | 38,318 | |
| October 15 | at Army | Michie Stadium; West Point, NY | L 29–30 | 32,125 | |
| October 22 | at Navy | Navy–Marine Corps Memorial Stadium; Annapolis, MD | W 35–14 | 38,156 | |
| October 29 | Memphis | Cardinal Stadium; Louisville, KY (rivalry) | W 10–6 | 36,219 | |
| November 3 | Boston College | Cardinal Stadium; Louisville, KY | L 14–35 | 38,711 | |
| November 12 | No. 9 Texas A&M | Cardinal Stadium; Louisville, KY | L 10–26 | 36,112 | |
| November 26 | Tulsa | Cardinal Stadium; Louisville, KY | W 34–27 | 35,655 | |
^{†}Homecoming; Rankings from AP Poll released prior to the game

== Roster ==
1994 Louisville Cardinals football team roster
Players
Coaches
Offense

| Pos. | # | Name | Class |
|---|---|---|---|
| TE | 37 | Jamie Asher |
| OT | 72 | Roman Oben |

Defense

| Pos. | # | Name | Class |
|---|---|---|---|
| LB | 59 | Alan Campos |
| CB | 13 | Sam Madison | So |
| LB | 52 | Tyrus McCloud | So |

Special teams

| Pos. | # | Name | Class |
|---|---|---|---|
| K | 39 | David Akers | So |

Head coach

- Howard Schnellenberger

Coordinators/assistant coaches

Legend

- (C) Team captain
- (S) Suspended
- (I) Ineligible
- Injured
- Redshirt
