= 1994 Army Cadets football team =

American college football season

1994 Army Cadets football
- Conference: Independent
- Record: 4–7
- Head coach: Bob Sutton (4th season)
- Offensive coordinator: Greg Gregory (6th as OC; 13th overall season)
- Offensive scheme: Triple option
- Defensive coordinator: Denny Doornbos (4th season)
- Base defense: 4–3
- Captains: Joe Ross; Pat Work
- Home stadium: Michie Stadium

1994 NCAA Division I-A independents football records
| | Conf. | | | Overall |
| Team | W | L | T | W | | L | | T |
|---|---|---|---|---|---|---|---|---|
| East Carolina | | – | | 7 | – | 5 | – | 0 |
| Louisville | | – | | 6 | – | 5 | – | 0 |
| Memphis | | – | | 6 | – | 5 | – | 0 |
| Southern Miss | | – | | 6 | – | 5 | – | 0 |
| Notre Dame | | – | | 6 | – | 5 | – | 1 |
| Army | | – | | 4 | – | 7 | – | 0 |
| Northeast Louisiana | | – | | 3 | – | 8 | – | 0 |
| Navy | | – | | 3 | – | 8 | – | 0 |
| Tulsa | | – | | 3 | – | 8 | – | 0 |
| Cincinnati | | – | | 2 | – | 8 | – | 1 |
| Tulane | | – | | 1 | – | 10 | – | 0 |
Rankings from AP Poll

The 1994 Army Cadets football team was an American football team that represented the United States Military Academy as an independent during the 1994 NCAA Division I-A football season. In their fourth season under head coach Bob Sutton, the Cadets compiled a 4–7 record and were outscored by their opponents by a combined total of 252 to 215. In the annual Army–Navy Game, the Cadets defeated Navy, 22–20.

== Schedule ==
| Date | Time | Opponent | Site | Result | Attendance | Source |
|---|---|---|---|---|---|---|
| September 10 | | Holy Cross | Michie Stadium; West Point, NY | W 49–3 | 26,535 | |
| September 15 | | at Duke | Wallace Wade Stadium; Durham, NC | L 7–43 | 24,342 | |
| September 24 | | Temple | Michie Stadium; West Point, NY | L 20–23 | | |
| October 1 | 5:00 p.m. | at Wake Forest | Groves Stadium; Winston-Salem, NC | L 27–33 | 17,571 | |
| October 8 | | at Rutgers | Giants Stadium; East Rutherford, NJ | L 14–16 | 20,511 | |
| October 15 | | Louisville | Michie Stadium; West Point, NY | W 30–29 | 32,125 | |
| October 22 | | The Citadel | Michie Stadium; West Point, NY | W 25–24 | 33,430 | |
| October 29 | | Boston College | Michie Stadium; West Point, NY | L 3–30 | 39,304 | |
| November 5 | | Air Force | Michie Stadium; West Point, NY (Commander-in-Chief's Trophy) | L 6–10 | | |
| November 12 | | No. 7 Boston University | Michie Stadium; West Point, NY | L 12–21 | | |
| December 3 | | vs. Navy | Veterans Stadium; Philadelphia, PA (Army–Navy Game) | W 22–20 | | |
Rankings from The Sports Network Poll released prior to the game

== Game summaries ==
=== Louisville ===
External videos
- Army highlights

=== vs Navy ===
Army Cadets (3–7) vs. Navy Midshipmen (3–7)

| Quarter | 1 | 2 | 3 | 4 | Total |
|---|---|---|---|---|---|
| Army | 10 | 0 | 9 | 3 | 22 |
| Navy | 14 | 0 | 6 | 0 | 20 |

at Veterans Stadium • Philadelphia, Pennsylvania

- Date: December 3
- Game attendance: 65,308
- TV announcers (ABC): Brent Musburger

Game information

Army

- Ronnie McAda
  8 Rush, 127 Yds

Navy

- Jim Kubiak
  24/34, 361 Yds, 2 TD, 3 INT
- Damon Dixon
  9 Rec

Kurt Heiss, who suffered from a congenital eye condition and had trouble seeing the goal posts, made the game-winning kick for Army.

Scoring summary

| Quarter | Time | Drive | | | Team | Scoring information | Score | |
| Quarter | Time | Plays | Yards | TOP | Team | Scoring information | ARMY | NAVY |
|---|---|---|---|---|---|---|---|---|
| 1 | | | | | Army | 21-yard field goal by Kurt Heiss | 3 | 0 |
| 1 | | | 81 | | Navy | Damon Dixon 27-yard touchdown reception from Jim Kubiak, Ryan Bucchianeri kick good | 3 | 7 |
| 1 | | | 61 | | Army | Joe Ross 1-yard touchdown run, Kurt Heiss kick good | 10 | 7 |
| 1 | | | | | Navy | Michael Jefferson 73-yard touchdown run, Ryan Bucchianeri kick good | 10 | 14 |
| 3 | | | | | Army | 35-yard field goal by Kurt Heiss | 13 | 14 |
| 3 | | | | | Army | Kevin Vaughn 1-yard touchdown run, 2-point run failed | 19 | 14 |
| 3 | 4:07 | | | | Navy | Kevin Hickman 56-yard touchdown reception from Jim Kubiak, 2-point run failed | 19 | 20 |
| 4 | 6:19 | | | | Army | 52-yard field goal by Kurt Heiss | 22 | 20 |
| "TOP" = time of possession. For other American football terms, see Glossary of American football. | | | | | | | 22 | 20 |

External videos
- Army highlights

== After the season ==
Army fullback Akili King was stabbed during a street fight in late January 1994.

== Roster ==
1994 Army Cadets football team roster
Players
Coaches
Offense

| Pos. | # | Name | Class |
|---|---|---|---|
| | | Steve Carpenter | Jr |
| RB | | Akili King |
| TE | 84 | Ron Leshinski | So |
| QB | | Mike Mackovec | Sr |
| QB | 7 | Ronnie McAda | So |
| QB | 14 | Rick Roper (injured) | Sr |
| FB | | Joe Ross |
| RB | | Kevin Vaughn |
| OT | 56 | Mike Wells | Jr |

Defense

| Pos. | # | Name | Class |
|---|---|---|---|
| DE | | Anthony Bianchi | So |
| LB | | Thomas Burrell | Jr |
| CB | | Garland Gay |
| S | 9 | Derek Klein | Jr |
| LB | | Ben Kotwica | So |
| DB | | Jami Wolocko |

Special teams

| Pos. | # | Name | Class |
|---|---|---|---|
| K | 6 | Kurt Heiss | Sr |

Head coach

- Bob Sutton

Coordinators/assistant coaches

Legend

- (C) Team captain
- (S) Suspended
- (I) Ineligible
- Injured
- Redshirt
