= 1994 Memphis Tigers football team =

American college football season

1994 Memphis Tigers football
- Conference: Independent
- Record: 6–5
- Head coach: Chuck Stobart (6th season)
- Offensive coordinator: Charlie Stubbs (1st season)
- Defensive coordinator: Tim Rose (3rd season)
- Home stadium: Liberty Bowl Memorial Stadium

1994 NCAA Division I-A independents football records
	Conf.			Overall
Team	W	L	T	W		L		T
East Carolina		–		7	–	5	–	0
Louisville		–		6	–	5	–	0
Memphis		–		6	–	5	–	0
Southern Miss		–		6	–	5	–	0
Notre Dame		–		6	–	5	–	1
Army		–		4	–	7	–	0
Northeast Louisiana		–		3	–	8	–	0
Navy		–		3	–	8	–	0
Tulsa		–		3	–	8	–	0
Cincinnati		–		2	–	8	–	1
Tulane		–		1	–	10	–	0
Rankings from AP Poll

The 1994 Memphis Tigers football team represented the University of Memphis in the 1994 NCAA Division I-A football season. The team was led by head coach Chuck Stobart. The Tigers played their home games at the Liberty Bowl Memorial Stadium.

== Schedule ==
Date	Opponent	Site	Result	Attendance	Source
September 3	Mississippi State	Liberty Bowl Memorial Stadium; Memphis, TN	L 6–17	35,106	
September 10	at Tulsa	Skelly Stadium; Tulsa, OK	W 42–18	21,324	
September 17	at Southern Miss	M. M. Roberts Stadium; Hattiesburg, MS (Black and Blue Bowl)	L 3–20	17,563	
September 24	Arkansas	Liberty Bowl Memorial Stadium; Memphis, TN	W 16–15	34,678	
October 8	Tulane	Liberty Bowl Memorial Stadium; Memphis, TN	W 13–0	19,400	
October 15	Arkansas State	Liberty Bowl Memorial Stadium; Memphis, TN (Paint Bucket Bowl)	W 15–6	19,857	
October 22	Cincinnati^{†}	Liberty Bowl Memorial Stadium; Memphis, TN (rivalry)	W 26–3	17,543	
October 29	Louisville	Cardinal Stadium; Louisville, KY (rivalry)	L 6–10	36,219	
November 5	at Ole Miss	Vaught–Hemingway Stadium; Oxford, MS (rivalry)	W 17–16	25,511	
November 12	Tennessee	Neyland Stadium; Knoxville, TN	L 13–24	94,690	
November 19	East Carolina	Liberty Bowl Memorial Stadium; Memphis, TN	L 6–30	23,355	
^{†}Homecoming
