= 1994 Kansas Jayhawks football team =

American college football season

1994 Kansas Jayhawks football
- Conference: Big Eight Conference
- Record: 6–5 (3–4 Big 8)
- Head coach: Glen Mason (7th season)
- Offensive coordinator: Pat Ruel (7th season)
- Home stadium: Memorial Stadium

1994 Big Eight Conference football standings
	Conf.					Overall
Team	W		L		T	W		L		T
No. 1 Nebraska $	7	–	0	–	0	13	–	0	–	0
No. 3 Colorado %	6	–	1	–	0	11	–	1	–	0
No. 19 Kansas State	5	–	2	–	0	9	–	3	–	0
Oklahoma	4	–	3	–	0	6	–	6	–	0
Kansas	3	–	4	–	0	6	–	5	–	0
Missouri	2	–	5	–	0	3	–	8	–	1
Oklahoma State	0	–	6	–	1	3	–	7	–	1
Iowa State	0	–	6	–	1	0	–	10	–	1
$ – Bowl Coalition representative as champion % – Bowl Coalition at-large representative; Rankings from AP Poll

The 1994 Kansas Jayhawks football team as a member of the Big Eight Conference during the 1994 NCAA Division I-A football season. Led by seventh-year head coach Glen Mason, the Jayhawks compiled an overall record of 6–5 with a mark of 3–4 in conference play, placing fifth in the Big 8. The team played home games at Memorial Stadium in Lawrence, Kansas.

== Schedule ==
Date	Time	Opponent	Site	TV	Result	Attendance	Source
September 1	7:00 p.m.	at Houston*	Houston Astrodome; Houston, TX	KSMO	W 35–13	18,150	
September 10	7:00 p.m.	Michigan State*	Memorial Stadium; Lawrence, KS		W 17–10	48,100	
September 17	7:00 p.m.	at TCU*	Amon G. Carter Stadium; Fort Worth, TX		L 21–31	37,313	
September 24	1:00 p.m.	UAB*	Memorial Stadium; Lawrence, KS		W 72–0	35,000	
October 6	7:00 p.m.	No. 19 Kansas State	Memorial Stadium; Lawrence, KS (rivalry)	ESPN	L 13–21	48,800	
October 15	1:00 p.m.	at Iowa State	Cyclone Stadium; Ames, IA		W 41–23	32,563	
October 22	1:00 p.m.	Oklahoma	Memorial Stadium; Lawrence, KS		L 17–20	42,500	
October 29	1:00 p.m.	Oklahoma State^{†}	Memorial Stadium; Lawrence, KS		W 24–14	31,000	
November 5	1:00 p.m.	at No. 1 Nebraska	Memorial Stadium; Lincoln, NE (rivalry)		L 17–45	75,543	
November 12	1:00 p.m.	No. 7 Colorado	Memorial Stadium; Lawrence, KS		L 26–51	35,000	
November 19	1:00 p.m.	at Missouri	Faurot Field; Columbia, MO (Border War)		W 31–14	35,648	
*Non-conference game; ^{†}Homecoming; Rankings from AP Poll released prior to the game; All times are in Central time

== Roster ==
1994 Kansas Jayhawks football team roster
Players
Coaches
Offense

Pos.	#	Name	Class
WR	1	Isaac Byrd	Fr
G	66	Hessley Hempstead	Sr
RB	20	June Henley	So
OT	54	Rod Jones	Jr
QB	15	Mark Williams	Jr

Defense

Pos.	#	Name	Class
LB	39	Don Davis	Sr
DB	8	Kwamie Lassiter	Sr
DB	3	Gerald McBurrows	Sr

Special teams

Pos.	#	Name	Class

Head coach

- Glen Mason

Coordinators/assistant coaches

- Pat Ruel – Offensive coordinator
- Terry Mohajir – Special Teams/Offensive Line

Legend

- (C) Team captain
- (S) Suspended
- (I) Ineligible
- Injured
- Redshirt

== Team players in the NFL ==
Player	Position	Round	Pick	NFL team
Gerald McBurrows	Safety	7	214	St. Louis Rams
Hessley Hempstead	Guard	7	228	Detroit Lions
