= 1994 Missouri Tigers football team =

American college football season

1994 Missouri Tigers football
- Conference: Big Eight Conference
- Record: 3–8–1 (2–5 Big 8)
- Head coach: Larry Smith (1st season)
- Offensive coordinator: Jerry Berndt (1st season)
- Defensive coordinator: Moe Ankney (1st season)
- Home stadium: Faurot Field

1994 Big Eight Conference football standings
	Conf.					Overall
Team	W		L		T	W		L		T
No. 1 Nebraska $	7	–	0	–	0	13	–	0	–	0
No. 3 Colorado %	6	–	1	–	0	11	–	1	–	0
No. 19 Kansas State	5	–	2	–	0	9	–	3	–	0
Oklahoma	4	–	3	–	0	6	–	6	–	0
Kansas	3	–	4	–	0	6	–	5	–	0
Missouri	2	–	5	–	0	3	–	8	–	1
Oklahoma State	0	–	6	–	1	3	–	7	–	1
Iowa State	0	–	6	–	1	0	–	10	–	1
$ – Bowl Coalition representative as champion % – Bowl Coalition at-large representative; Rankings from AP Poll

The 1994 Missouri Tigers football team represented the University of Missouri during the 1994 NCAA Division I-A football season. They played their home games at Faurot Field in Columbia, Missouri. They were members of the Big 8 Conference. The team was coached by first–year head coach Larry Smith.

== Schedule ==
Date	Time	Opponent	Site	TV	Result	Attendance	Source
September 3	7:00 pm	Tulsa*	Faurot Field; Columbia, MO		L 17–20	55,263	
September 10	1:00 pm	at Illinois*	Memorial Stadium; Champaign, IL (rivalry)		L 0–42	64,305	
September 17	7:00 pm	at Houston*	Houston Astrodome; Houston, TX		W 16–0	18,310	
October 1	1:00 pm	West Virginia*	Faurot Field; Columbia, MO		L 10–34	40,251	
October 8	1:00 pm	No. 5 Colorado	Faurot Field; Columbia, MO	PSN	L 23–38	38,901	
October 15	2:00 pm	at Oklahoma State	Lewis Field; Stillwater, OK		W 24–15	30,120	
October 22	1:00 pm	No. 3 Nebraska	Faurot Field; Columbia, MO (rivalry)		L 7–42	50,537	
October 29	1:00 pm	at Iowa State	Cyclone Stadium; Ames, IA (rivalry)		W 34–20	31,530	
November 5	1:30 pm	at Oklahoma	Oklahoma Memorial Stadium; Norman, OK (rivalry)		L 13–30	54,463	
November 12	1:00 pm	No. 11 Kansas State	Faurot Field; Columbia, MO		L 18–21	35,361	
November 19	1:00 pm	Kansas	Faurot Field; Columbia, MO (Border War)		L 14–31	35,648	
November 26	10:00 pm	at Hawaii*	Aloha Stadium; Halawa, HI		T 32–32	33,979	
*Non-conference game; Rankings from AP Poll released prior to the game; All times are in Central time

== Coaching staff ==
Name	Position	Seasons at Missouri	Alma mater
Larry Smith	Head coach	1	Bowling Green (1961)
Jerry Berndt	Offensive coordinator & quarterbacks	1	Wisconsin–Superior (1960)
Curtis Jones	Defensive line & tight end	6	Missouri (1968)
Harry Hiestand	Offensive line	1	East Stroudsburg (1980)
Eric Wright	Wide receivers	1	Missouri (1981)
Andy Moeller	Offensive tackle, running back & special teams coordinator	2	Michigan (1986)
Moe Ankney	Defensive coordinator	1	Bowling Green (1963)
Ricky Hunley	Defensive line & linebackers	1	Arizona (1984)
Jon Hoke	Defensive backs	1	Ball State (1980)
Skip Hall	Assistant	2	
Jay Johnson	Graduate assistant	1	Northern Iowa (1992)
