= 1994 Kansas State Wildcats football team =

American college football season

1994 Kansas State Wildcats football

Aloha Bowl, L 7–12 vs. Boston College
- Conference: Big Eight Conference

Ranking
- Coaches: No. 16
- AP: No. 19
- Record: 9–3 (5–2 Big 8)
- Head coach: Bill Snyder (6th season)
- Offensive coordinator: Del Miller (6th season)
- Offensive scheme: Multiple
- Co-defensive coordinators: Jim Leavitt (4th season); Bob Stoops (4th season)
- Base defense: 4–3
- Home stadium: KSU Stadium

1994 Big Eight Conference football standings
	Conf.					Overall
Team	W		L		T	W		L		T
No. 1 Nebraska $	7	–	0	–	0	13	–	0	–	0
No. 3 Colorado %	6	–	1	–	0	11	–	1	–	0
No. 19 Kansas State	5	–	2	–	0	9	–	3	–	0
Oklahoma	4	–	3	–	0	6	–	6	–	0
Kansas	3	–	4	–	0	6	–	5	–	0
Missouri	2	–	5	–	0	3	–	8	–	1
Oklahoma State	0	–	6	–	1	3	–	7	–	1
Iowa State	0	–	6	–	1	0	–	10	–	1
$ – Bowl Coalition representative as champion % – Bowl Coalition at-large representative; Rankings from AP Poll

The 1994 Kansas State Wildcats football team represented Kansas State University in the 1994 NCAA Division I-A football season. The team's head football coach was Bill Snyder. The Wildcats played their home games in KSU Stadium. 1994 saw the Wildcats finish with a record of 9–3, and a 5–2 record in Big Eight Conference play. The season ended with a loss against Boston College in the 1994 Aloha Bowl.

== Schedule ==
Date	Time	Opponent	Rank	Site	TV	Result	Attendance
September 3	6:30 p.m.	Southwestern Louisiana*		KSU Stadium; Manhattan, KS		W 34–6	38,216
September 17	1:10 p.m.	Rice*		KSU Stadium; Manhattan, KS		W 27–18	36,973
September 24	6:30 p.m.	Minnesota*		KSU Stadium; Manhattan, KS		W 35–0	40,002
October 6	7:05 p.m.	at Kansas	No. 19	Memorial Stadium; Lawrence, KS (rivalry)	ESPN	W 21–13	48,800
October 15	11:00 a.m.	No. 2 Nebraska	No. 16	KSU Stadium; Manhattan, KS (rivalry)	ABC	L 6–17	42,817
October 22	6:30 p.m.	at No. 2 Colorado	No. 19	Folsom Field; Boulder, CO (rivalry)	ESPN	L 21–35	52,955
October 29	1:30 p.m.	at Oklahoma	No. 23	Oklahoma Memorial Stadium; Norman, OK		W 37–20	60,415
November 5	1:10 p.m.	Iowa State^{†}	No. 15	KSU Stadium; Manhattan, KS (rivalry)		W 38–20	38,572
November 12	1:00 p.m.	at Missouri	No. 11	Faurot Field; Columbia, MO		W 21–18	35,361
November 19	1:10 p.m.	Oklahoma State	No. 11	KSU Stadium; Manhattan, KS		W 23–6	32,815
November 26	3:00 p.m.	at UNLV*	No. 11	Sam Boyd Stadium; Whitney, NV		W 42–3	10,331
December 25	2:30 p.m.	vs. Boston College*	No. 11	Aloha Stadium; Honolulu, HI (Aloha Bowl)	ABC	L 7–12	44,862
*Non-conference game; ^{†}Homecoming; Rankings from AP Poll released prior to the game; All times are in Central time

== Game summaries ==
=== Nebraska ===
Nebraska at Kansas State

Team	1	2	3	4	Total
• No. 2 Huskers	7	0	0	10	17
No. 16 Wildcats	0	6	0	0	6

- Date: October 15
- Location: KSU Stadium, Manhattan, Kansas
- Game attendance: 42,817

=== Vs. Boston College (Aloha Bowl) ===
Kansas State vs. Boston College

Team	1	2	3	4	Total
No. 11 Wildcats	7	0	0	0	7
• Eagles	7	2	0	3	12

- Date: December 25
- Location: Aloha Stadium, Honolulu, Hawaii
- Game attendance: 44,862

== Roster ==
1994 Kansas State Wildcats football team roster
Players
Coaches
Offense

Pos.	#	Name	Class
OT	73	Barrett Brooks	Sr
WR	83	Kevin Lockett	So
TE	80	Brian Lojka	Jr
QB	5	Chad May	Sr

Defense

Pos.	#	Name	Class
LB		Mike Ekeler	Sr
LB	9	Percell Gaskins	Sr
LB	45	Kirby Hocutt	Sr
DE	34	Craig McEwan	Jr
LB	54	Laird Veatch	Sr

Special teams

Pos.	#	Name	Class

Head coach

- Bill Snyder

Coordinators/assistant coaches

- Del Miller – Offensive Coordinator & assistant head coach
- Dana Dimel – Offensive line & recruiting game coordinator
- Manny Matsakis – Tight ends & Special Teams Coordinator
- Rod Humenuik – Offensive line
- Bob Stoops – co-Defensive Coordinator
- Jim Leavitt – co-Defensive Coordinator & linebackers
- Mo Latimore – Interior defensive line
- Mike Stoops – Defensive ends
- Mark Mangino – Recruiting game coordinator

Legend

- (C) Team captain
- (S) Suspended
- (I) Ineligible
- Injured
- Redshirt

== Team players in the NFL ==
Player	Position	Round	Pick	NFL club
Barrett Brooks	Tackle	2	58	Philadelphia Eagles
Chad May	Quarterback	4	111	Minnesota Vikings
