= 1994 Oklahoma State Cowboys football team =

American college football season

1994 Oklahoma State Cowboys football
- Conference: Big Eight Conference
- Record: 3–7–1 (0–6–1 Big 8)
- Head coach: Pat Jones (11th season)
- Offensive coordinator: Mike Gundy (1st season)
- Defensive coordinator: Bill Miller (6th season)
- Home stadium: Lewis Field

1994 Big Eight Conference football standings
	Conf.					Overall
Team	W		L		T	W		L		T
No. 1 Nebraska $	7	–	0	–	0	13	–	0	–	0
No. 3 Colorado %	6	–	1	–	0	11	–	1	–	0
No. 19 Kansas State	5	–	2	–	0	9	–	3	–	0
Oklahoma	4	–	3	–	0	6	–	6	–	0
Kansas	3	–	4	–	0	6	–	5	–	0
Missouri	2	–	5	–	0	3	–	8	–	1
Oklahoma State	0	–	6	–	1	3	–	7	–	1
Iowa State	0	–	6	–	1	0	–	10	–	1
$ – Bowl Coalition representative as champion % – Bowl Coalition at-large representative; Rankings from AP Poll

The 1994 Oklahoma State Cowboys football team represented Oklahoma State University as a member of the Big Eight Conference during the 1994 NCAA Division I-A football season. Led by Pat Jones in his 11th and final season as head coach, the Cowboys compiled an overall record of 3–7–1 with a mark of 0–6–1 in conference play, tying for seventh place at the bottom of the Big 8 standings. Oklahoma State played home games at Lewis Field in Stillwater, Oklahoma.

== Schedule ==
Date	Time	Opponent	Site	Result	Attendance	Source
September 1	7:00 p.m.	at Northern Illinois*	Huskie Stadium; DeKalb, IL	W 31–14	15,713	
September 17	7:00 p.m.	at Baylor*	Floyd Casey Stadium; Waco, TX	L 10–14	40,214	
September 24	6:00 p.m.	Tulsa*	Lewis Field; Stillwater, OK (rivalry)	W 17–10	46,840	
October 1	6:00 p.m.	North Texas*	Lewis Field; Stillwater, OK	W 36–34	31,107	
October 8	1:00 p.m.	at No. 2 Nebraska	Memorial Stadium; Lincoln, NE	L 3–32	75,434	
October 15	2:00 p.m.	Missouri	Lewis Field; Stillwater, OK	L 15–24	30,120	
October 21	2:00 p.m.	Iowa State^{†}	Lewis Field; Stillwater, OK	T 31–31	36,310	
October 29	1:00 p.m.	at Kansas	Memorial Stadium; Lawrence, KS	L 14–24	31,000	
November 5	12:00 p.m.	at No. 7 Colorado	Folsom Field; Boulder, CO	L 3–17	51,059	
November 12	2:00 p.m.	Oklahoma	Lewis Field; Stillwater, OK (Bedlam Series)	L 14–33	50,116	
November 19	1:10 p.m.	at No. 11 Kansas State	KSU Stadium; Manhattan, KS	L 6–23	32,815	
*Non-conference game; ^{†}Homecoming; Rankings from AP Poll released prior to the game; All times are in Central time

== After the season ==
The 1995 NFL draft was held on April 22–23, 1995. The following Cowboy was selected.

Round	Pick	Player	Position	NFL club
4	130	Linc Harden	Linebacker	Dallas Cowboys
