= 1994 Northeast Louisiana Indians football team =

American college football season

1994 Northeast Louisiana Indians football
- Conference: Independent
- Record: 3–8
- Head coach: Ed Zaunbrecher (1st season)
- Offensive coordinator: Ed Zaunbrecher (1st season)
- Defensive coordinator: Dave Dunkelberger (1st season)
- Home stadium: Malone Stadium

1994 NCAA Division I-A independents football records
	Conf.			Overall
Team	W	L	T	W		L		T
East Carolina		–		7	–	5	–	0
Louisville		–		6	–	5	–	0
Memphis		–		6	–	5	–	0
Southern Miss		–		6	–	5	–	0
Notre Dame		–		6	–	5	–	1
Army		–		4	–	7	–	0
Northeast Louisiana		–		3	–	8	–	0
Navy		–		3	–	8	–	0
Tulsa		–		3	–	8	–	0
Cincinnati		–		2	–	8	–	1
Tulane		–		1	–	10	–	0
Rankings from AP Poll

The 1994 Northeast Louisiana Indians football team was an American football team that represented Northeast Louisiana University (now known as the University of Louisiana at Monroe) as an independent during the 1994 NCAA Division I-A football season. In their first year under head coach Ed Zaunbrecher, the team compiled a 3–8 record. The Indians offense scored 242 points while the defense allowed 384 points.

== Schedule ==
Date	Time	Opponent	Site	Result	Attendance	Source
September 3	1:00 pm	at No. 8 Colorado	Folsom Field; Boulder, CO	L 13–48	48,114	
September 10	6:00 pm	at No. 12 Auburn	Jordan–Hare Stadium; Auburn, AL	L 12–44	78,437	
September 17	12:00 pm	at Georgia	Sanford Stadium; Athens, GA	L 6–70	70,611	
September 24	9:00 pm	at Nevada	Mackay Stadium; Reno, NV	L 22–34	20,316	
October 1	7:00 pm	Weber State	Malone Stadium; Monroe, LA	W 62–37	18,147	
October 8		at Wyoming	War Memorial Stadium; Laramie, WY	L 14–28	20,176	
October 15	7:00 pm	UCF	Malone Stadium; Monroe, LA	L 16–33	8,123	
October 22	7:00 pm	Jacksonville State	Malone Stadium; Monroe, LA	L 28–32	17,101	
November 5	1:00 pm	at No. 25 BYU	Cougar Stadium; Provo, UT	L 10–24	57,579	
November 12	12:00 pm	at Kentucky	Commonwealth Stadium; Lexington, KY	W 21–14	32,000	
November 19	7:00 pm	No. 15 (I-AA) North Texas	Malone Stadium; Monroe, LA	W 38–20	16,438	
Rankings from AP Poll released prior to the game; All times are in Central time
