= 1994 Oklahoma Sooners football team =

American college football season

1994 Oklahoma Sooners football

Copper Bowl, L 6–31 vs. BYU
- Conference: Big Eight Conference
- Record: 6–6 (4–3 Big 8)
- Head coach: Gary Gibbs (6th season)
- Offensive coordinator: Watson Brown (2nd season)
- Offensive scheme: Multiple
- Defensive coordinator: Tom Hayes (4th season)
- Base defense: 5–2
- Captains: John Anderson; Albert Hall; Darrius Johnson; Garrick McGee
- Home stadium: Oklahoma Memorial Stadium

1994 Big Eight Conference football standings
	Conf.					Overall
Team	W		L		T	W		L		T
No. 1 Nebraska $	7	–	0	–	0	13	–	0	–	0
No. 3 Colorado %	6	–	1	–	0	11	–	1	–	0
No. 19 Kansas State	5	–	2	–	0	9	–	3	–	0
Oklahoma	4	–	3	–	0	6	–	6	–	0
Kansas	3	–	4	–	0	6	–	5	–	0
Missouri	2	–	5	–	0	3	–	8	–	1
Oklahoma State	0	–	6	–	1	3	–	7	–	1
Iowa State	0	–	6	–	1	0	–	10	–	1
$ – Bowl Coalition representative as champion % – Bowl Coalition at-large representative; Rankings from AP Poll

The 1994 Oklahoma Sooners football team represented the University of Oklahoma during the 1994 NCAA Division I-A football season. They played their home games at Oklahoma Memorial Stadium and competed as members of the Big Eight Conference. They were coached by sixth-year head coach Gary Gibbs, who resigned at the conclusion of the season.

== Schedule ==
Date	Time	Opponent	Rank	Site	TV	Result	Attendance
September 3	6:30 p.m.	at Syracuse*	No. 16	Carrier Dome; Syracuse, NY	ESPN	W 30–29	48,421
September 10	4:00 p.m.	at No. 16 Texas A&M*	No. 15	Kyle Field; College Station, TX		L 14–36	72,577
September 17	1:30 p.m.	Texas Tech*	No. 21	Oklahoma Memorial Stadium; Norman, OK		W 17–11	62,323
October 1	1:30 p.m.	Iowa State	No. 21	Oklahoma Memorial Stadium; Norman, OK		W 34–6	65,821
October 8	2:30 p.m.	vs. No. 15 Texas*	No. 16	Cotton Bowl; Dallas, TX (Red River Shootout)	ABC	L 10–17	75,587
October 15	8:30 p.m.	No. 4 Colorado	No. 22	Folsom Field; Boulder, CO	ESPN	L 7–45	53,199
October 22	1:00 p.m.	at Kansas		Memorial Stadium; Lawrence, KS		W 20–17	42,500
October 29	1:30 p.m.	No. 23 Kansas State^{†}		Oklahoma Memorial Stadium; Norman, OK		L 20–37	60,415
November 5	1:30 p.m.	Missouri		Oklahoma Memorial Stadium; Norman, OK (rivalry)		W 30–13	54,463
November 13	2:00 p.m.	at Oklahoma State		Lewis Field; Stillwater, OK (Bedlam Series)		W 33–14	50,116
November 25	1:30 p.m.	No. 1 Nebraska		Oklahoma Memorial Stadium; Norman, OK (rivalry)	ABC	L 3–13	70,216
December 29	7:00 p.m.	vs. No. 22 BYU*		Arizona Stadium; Tucson, AZ (Copper Bowl)	ESPN	L 6–31	45,122
*Non-conference game; ^{†}Homecoming; Rankings from AP Poll released prior to the game; All times are in Central time

== Rankings ==
Ranking movements Legend: ██ Increase in ranking ██ Decrease in ranking — = Not ranked
	Week																
Poll	Pre	1	2	3	4	5	6	7	8	9	10	11	12	13	14	15	Final
AP	16	16	15	21	21	21	16	22	—	—	—	—	—	—	—	—	—
Coaches	13	13	15	19	16	17	12	21	—	25	—	—	—	—	—	—	—

== Game summaries ==
=== Texas ===
Oklahoma Sooners (3–1) vs. Texas Longhorns (3–1)

Quarter	1	2	3	4	Total
Texas	0	0	10	7	17
Oklahoma	0	7	0	3	10

at Cotton Bowl • Dallas, Texas

- Date: October 8
- Game time: 2:30 p.m.
- Game weather: Partly sunny • 70 °F (21 °C) • Wind 15 mph (24 km/h) N
- Game attendance: 75,587
- Referee: Dale
- TV: ABC
- Texas Sports

Game information

Texas

- James Brown
  17/22, 148 Yds, TD, INT
- Rodrick Walker
  23 Rush, 77 Yds
- Eric Jackson
  2 Rec, 30 Yds

Oklahoma

- Garrick McGee
  12/19, 192 Yds, INT
- James Allen
  19 Rush, 88 Yds
- Albert Hall
  4 Rec, 69 Yds

Stonie Clark tackled James Allen on the one-yard line on fourth down with less than 45 seconds remaining in the game.

Scoring summary

Quarter	Time	Drive			Team	Scoring information	Score	
Quarter	Time	Plays	Yards	TOP	Team	Scoring information	TEX	OU
2	11:43	6	88		Oklahoma	Moore 23-yard touchdown run, Blanton kick good	0	7
3	9:45	13	80		Texas	19-yard field goal by Dawson	3	7
3	0:17	15	81		Texas	Brown 9-yard touchdown run, Dawson kick good	10	7
4	13:05	5	21		Texas	Fitzgerald 2-yard touchdown reception from Brown, Dawson kick good	17	7
4	6:40	16	75		Oklahoma	22-yard field goal by Blanton		
"TOP" = time of possession. For other American football terms, see Glossary of American football.							17	10

== Roster ==
1994 Oklahoma Sooners football team roster
Players
Coaches
Offense

Pos.	#	Name	Class
RB	25	James Allen	So
WR	1	Albert Hall (C)	Sr
QB	8	Garrick McGee (C)	Jr
RB	7	Jerald Moore	So

Defense

Pos.	#	Name	Class
S	39	John Anderson (C)	Sr
CB	42	Darrius Johnson (C)	Jr
DE	57	Cedric Jones	Jr

Special teams

Pos.	#	Name	Class
K	16	Scott Blanton	Sr

Head coach

- Gary Gibbs

Coordinators/assistant coaches

- Watson Brown – Offensive coordinator
- Mike Jones – Running backs
- Clarence James – Wide receivers
- Charley North – Tight ends and special teams
- Tom Hayes – Defensive coordinator
- Kevin Wolthausen – Defensive line
- Lucious Selmon – Outside linebacker and defensive end
- Johnny Barr – Linebackers
- Clancy Pendergast – Graduate assistant

Legend

- (C) Team captain
- (S) Suspended
- (I) Ineligible
- Injured
- Redshirt

Roster
