= 1994 Aloha Bowl =

American college football game

Kansas State Wildcats	Boston College Eagles
(9–2)	(6-4-1)
7	12
Head coach: Bill Snyder	Head coach: Dan Henning
AP / Coaches / BC; 11 / 8 / 10	AP / Coaches / BC; NR / 25 / NR
	1	2	3	4	Total
Kansas State	7	0	0	0	7
Boston College	7	2	0	3	12
- Date: December 25, 1994
- Season: 1994
- Stadium: Aloha Stadium
- Location: Honolulu, Hawaii
- MVP: Mike Mamula
- Halftime show: Shari Lewis with Lamb Chop
- Attendance: 44,862

United States TV coverage
- Network: ABC

The 1994 Aloha Bowl was a college football bowl game played December 25, 1994, in Honolulu, Hawaii. It was part of the 1994 NCAA Division I-A football season. It featured the Kansas State Wildcats, and the Boston College Eagles.

Boston College sacked Kansas State quarterback Chad May eight times, including a four-hit effort by end Mike Mamula, who was named the game's most valuable player. Kansas State rushed for just 30 yards, and threw for 94 more, for a total of 124 yards. Kansas State's only score came with eight seconds left in the first quarter when Joe Gordon crashed the middle of Boston College's line and blocked a punt by Jeff Beckley. Chris Sublette recovered the ball on the first hop in the end zone and the game was tied, 7–7.

However, Boston College answered with its own end zone patrol later in the half when Mamula applied the biggest of his hits on May for a safety with 2:37 left. Still, a defense that featured punter Eric Hardy, Gordon, and a pair of 10-tackle performances from Chuck Marlowe and Mario Smith kept the Wildcats within striking distance until the end. Boston College tacked on a 35-yard field goal by David Gordon with 1:18 remaining in the game to seal the win for the Eagles.
