= 1995 Fiesta Bowl =

1995 IBM OS/2 Fiesta Bowl
- 24th Fiesta Bowl
Colorado Buffaloes	Notre Dame Fighting Irish
(10–1)	(6–4–1)
Big 8	Independent
41	24
Head coach: Bill McCartney	Head coach: Lou Holtz
AP / Coaches / BC; 4 / 5 / 4
	1	2	3	4	Total
Colorado	10	21	3	7	41
Notre Dame	3	7	7	7	24
- Date: January 2, 1995
- Season: 1994
- Stadium: Sun Devil Stadium
- Location: Tempe, Arizona
- MVP: QB Kordell Stewart & DE Shannon Clavelle
- Referee: Terry Monk (Big East)
- Attendance: 73,968

United States TV coverage
- Network: NBC
- Announcers: Charlie Jones, Randy Cross
- Nielsen ratings: 6.0

International TV coverage
- Network: NBC

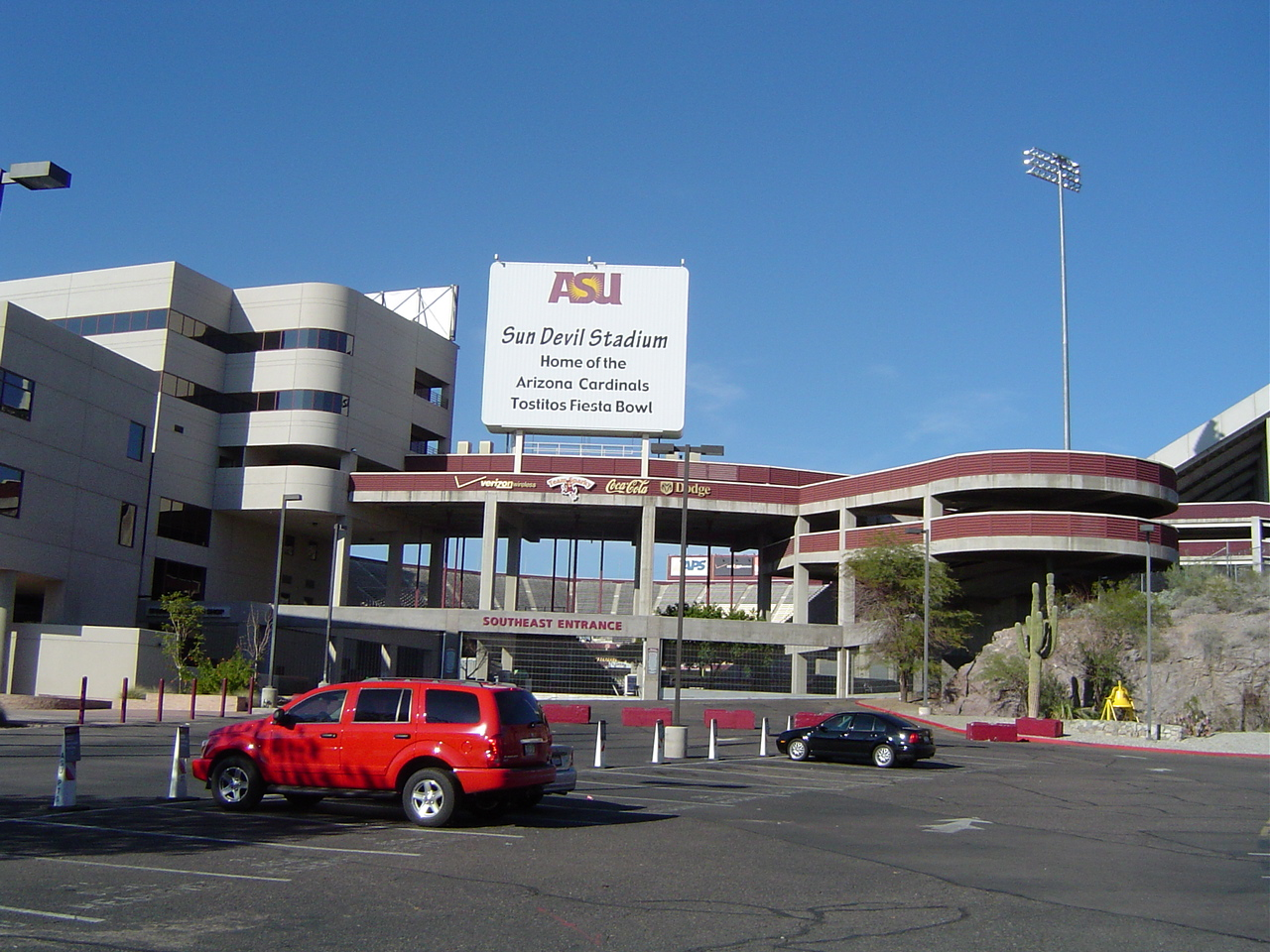
Sun Devil Stadium in Tempe, Arizona, hosted the Fiesta Bowl.

The 1995 IBM OS/2 Fiesta Bowl, played on January 2, 1995, was the 24th edition of the Fiesta Bowl. The game featured the Colorado Buffaloes and Notre Dame Fighting Irish.

== First half ==
Colorado kicker, Neil Voskeritchian, started the scoring with a 33-yard field goal in the first quarter, to give the Buffaloes the early 3–0 lead. Later in the 1st quarter, quarterback Kordell Stewart tossed a 1-yard pass to Christian Fauria for a touchdown, and a 10–0 Colorado lead. Scott Cengia got Notre Dame on the board with a 29-yard field goal to make it 10–3.

In the second quarter Colorado sealed its win, by scoring three consecutive touchdowns. Kordell Stewart started by rushing 9 yards for a touchdown, then Rashaan Salaam scored two 1-yard touchdown runs to increase the lead to 31–3. Ron Powlus threw a 9-yard touchdown pass to Derrick Mayes to cut the lead to 31–10 before halftime.

== Second half ==
Powlus threw a 40-yard touchdown pass to Mayes to cut the lead to 31–17, early in the third quarter. Then Voskeritchian kicked a 48-yard field goal to extend Colorado's lead to 34–17. Rashaan Salaam put the exclamation mark on the game with a 5-yard touchdown run, increasing Colorado's lead to 41–17. Notre Dame scored one last time on a 7-yard pass from Powlus to Leon Wallace to provide the final margin.
