= 1994 East Carolina Pirates football team =

American college football season

1994 East Carolina Pirates football

Liberty Bowl, L 0–30 vs. Illinois
- Conference: Independent
- Record: 7–5
- Head coach: Steve Logan (3rd season)
- Offensive coordinator: Todd Berry (3rd season)
- Offensive scheme: Pro-style
- Defensive coordinator: Paul Jette (1st season)
- Base defense: 4–3
- Home stadium: Ficklen Memorial Stadium

1994 NCAA Division I-A independents football records
	Conf.			Overall
Team	W	L	T	W		L		T
East Carolina		–		7	–	5	–	0
Louisville		–		6	–	5	–	0
Memphis		–		6	–	5	–	0
Southern Miss		–		6	–	5	–	0
Notre Dame		–		6	–	5	–	1
Army		–		4	–	7	–	0
Northeast Louisiana		–		3	–	8	–	0
Navy		–		3	–	8	–	0
Tulsa		–		3	–	8	–	0
Cincinnati		–		2	–	8	–	1
Tulane		–		1	–	10	–	0
Rankings from AP Poll

The 1994 East Carolina Pirates football team was an American football team that represented East Carolina University as an independent during the 1994 NCAA Division I-A football season. In their third season under head coach Steve Logan, the team compiled a 7–5 record.

== Schedule ==
Date	Time	Opponent	Site	TV	Result	Attendance	Source
September 10	7:00 pm	at Duke	Wallace Wade Stadium; Durham, NC		L 10–13	36,420	
September 17	6:00 pm	at Temple	Veterans Stadium; Philadelphia, PA		W 31–14	9,137	
September 24	4:00 pm	Syracuse	Ficklen Memorial Stadium; Greenville, NC		L 18–21	33,127	
October 1	4:00 pm	Southern Miss	Ficklen Memorial Stadium; Greenville, NC		W 31–10	32,867	
October 8	1:00 pm	at South Carolina	Williams–Brice Stadium; Columbia, SC	WNCT	W 56–42	70,075	
October 15	1:30 pm	No. 19 Virginia Tech	Ficklen Memorial Stadium; Greenville, NC		L 20–27	34,741	
October 22	7:00 pm	at Tulsa	Skelly Stadium; Tulsa, OK		W 28–21	24,811	
October 29	1:30 pm	Cincinnati^{†}	Ficklen Memorial Stadium; Greenville, NC		W 35–21	33,287	
November 5	2:00 pm	at No. 3 Auburn	Jordan–Hare Stadium; Auburn, AL	PPV	L 21–38	84,738	
November 12	1:30 pm	UCF	Ficklen Memorial Stadium; Greenville, NC		W 23–20	25,783	
November 19	2:00 pm	at Memphis	Liberty Bowl Memorial Stadium; Memphis, TN	WNCT	W 30–6	23,355	
December 31	1:00 pm	vs. Illinois	Liberty Bowl Memorial Stadium; Memphis, TN (Liberty Bowl)	ESPN	L 0–30	46,212	
^{†}Homecoming; Rankings from AP Poll released prior to the game; All times are in Eastern time
