= Phil Savoy =

American football player (born 1975)

Phil Savoy (born February 16, 1975) is a former American football wide receiver in the Arena Football League (AFL) who played for the Nashville Kats. He played college football for the Colorado Buffaloes.
