= 1994 NCAA Division I-A football season =

American college football season

1994 NCAA Division I-A season
- Number of teams: 107
- Preseason AP No. 1: Florida

Postseason
- Bowl games: 19
- Heisman Trophy: Colorado running back Rashaan Salaam

Bowl Coalition Championship
- 1995 Orange Bowl
- Site: Miami Orange Bowl, Miami, Florida
- Champion(s): Nebraska (AP, Coaches, FWAA)

Division I-A football seasons
- ← 1993 1995 →

The 1994 NCAA Division I-A football season, play of college football in the United States at the NCAA Division I-A level, began in August 1994 and ended on January 2, 1995. Nebraska, who finished the season undefeated, ended the year ranked No. 1 in both the Associated Press and Coaches polls. This was the first national championship of coach Tom Osborne's career at Nebraska, having come close the year before, when Nebraska lost to eventual national champion Florida State on a missed field goal as time expired.

Although Osborne's team finished the season unbeaten, the national championship picture again was clouded in controversy. For most of the second half of the season, Nebraska and and also undefeated Penn State were regarded as the top two teams in the country, and both had been ranked No. 1 in the polls for at least two weeks. This raised the possibility of a split national championship for the third time since 1990, due in large part to the system in place that had been concocted to avoid a split title.

Following the 1991 season, when Miami and Washington split the national championship in the AP and Coaches' polls, the Bowl Coalition was founded. The Coalition consisted of six bowls, with the Orange, Fiesta, Cotton, and Sugar bowls were all considered potential hosts for a national championship game. Since three of these bowls already had specific tie-ins with conferences, an agreement was struck where the conferences would agree to release those teams from their contractual obligations in order to achieve a No. 1 vs No. 2 matchup. For the first two years of the Coalition, this occurred without incident as the Sugar and Orange Bowls in 1993 and 1994 featured No. 1 vs. No. 2 matchups in their respective games.

The problem with this as far as 1994 was concerned was that the Rose Bowl, which contractually featured the Pac-10 and Big Ten champions playing each other, was not included in the Coalition and thus a team that finished No. 1 or No. 2 in the polls from those two conferences could not be considered by the Coalition to play in its national championship game. No. 1 Nebraska, as a member of the Big Eight Conference, was part of the coalition while No. 2 Penn State of the Big Ten was not. As Nebraska went on to win the conference title, it earned an automatic bid to the Orange Bowl to face off against No. 3 Miami, who won the Big East title and was No. 2 in the Coalition pool. Thus Miami, despite having incurred a decisive loss at home earlier in the season to Washington, had a chance to stake a technical claim as national champion with a win, as they would have been awarded the Coaltion Trophy for that honor. (In that scenario, however, undefeated No. 2 Penn State was certain to be voted the national champion in both the AP and CNN/USA Today Coaches polls, not to mention by universal acclimation, provided they defeated No. 13 Oregon in the Rose Bowl.)

On the night of January 1, 1995, as it turned out, Nebraska overcame a halftime deficit to outlast Miami in the Orange Bowl 24–17, and went on to be crowned as champions in the AP and Coaches polls. (The other New Years bowl games were played on January 2nd due to the 1st falling on a Sunday. Penn State defeated Oregon in the Rose Bowl by a more decisive 38–20, but remained in the No. 2 slot in the final voting.)

In the offseason that followed, the Bowl Coalition was disbanded and in its place came the Bowl Alliance, which attempted to serve the same purpose by rotating a national championship game between the Sugar, Fiesta, and Orange Bowls. Like the Bowl Coalition before it, the Bowl Alliance did not include the Rose Bowl and two of the three national championship games did not feature a No. 1 vs. No. 2 matchup, with the 1997 season seeing another split national championship.

== Conference and program changes ==
- The number of teams in Division I-A grew to 107 as Northeast Louisiana University (now Louisiana Monroe) left Division I-AA's Southland Conference and became an independent.
- Prior to the season, Memphis State University changed its name to the University of Memphis. From 1994 onward, they compete in all athletics as the Memphis Tigers.

School	1993 Conference	1994 Conference
Northeast Louisiana Indians	Southland (I-AA)	I-A Independent

=== Southwest Conference announces dissolution ===
In February 1994, before the season began, an announcement was made regarding the future of the Southwest Conference. In 1991, the SWC became an all-Texas conference as Arkansas left the SWC to join the Southeastern Conference. As 1994 began Texas was rumored to be considering joining the Pac-10 with Big Eight member Colorado (rumors that would resurface over a decade later, which eventually resulted in Colorado joining the Pac-10 with Utah to form the Pac-12), while Texas A&M was reported to be looking at joining the SEC (which they would eventually do in 2012). On February 25, 1994, it was announced that Texas, Texas Tech, Texas A&M, and Baylor would be joining with all eight of the teams in the Big Eight to form the Big 12 Conference, in 1996. Following this decision, another decision was made regarding the future of remaining SWC members SMU, Houston, TCU, and Rice; SMU, TCU, and Rice would join the Western Athletic Conference while Houston joined Conference USA. (TCU, SMU, and Rice all eventually became part of Conference USA as well, with TCU being the first to join while the other three schools joined as part of the 2005 conference realignment. TCU left for the Mountain West Conference in 2005 and eventually joined their former SWC brethren in the Big 12, while SMU and Houston became part of the American Athletic Conference in 2013 with the former Big East football schools that were still in the conference. Rice joined the AAC in 2023. Houston would eventually accept an invite to the Big 12, joining the conference for the 2023 season, and SMU would join the Atlantic Coast Conference in 2024.)

== Notable games ==
- The Miracle at Michigan: in a September 24 matchup between No. 4 Michigan and No. 7 Colorado, the visiting Buffaloes trailed the host Wolverines 26–14 with 2:16 remaining in the game. Colorado scored two touchdowns in the final minutes, the last being a 64–yard pass from Kordell Stewart to Michael Westbrook on the last play of the game.
- Choke at Doak: In the annual matchup between Florida and Florida State, the visiting Gators led the defending national champion Seminoles 31–3 entering the fourth quarter. Florida State rallied to score four touchdowns in the final period, but ran out of time to potentially score the winning points on their last possession and the game ended in a 31–31 tie.
- Penn State-Indiana: Despite trouncing No. 21 Ohio State 63–14 in Happy Valley on October 29, Penn State was dropped to No. 2 in the next AP poll, presumably on account of No. 3 Nebraska's impressive defeat of No. 2 Colorado, 24–7. The Nittany Lions remained No. 1 in the CNN/USA Today Coaches poll by a slim margin. Penn State traveled to Indiana for their next game and held a comfortable 35–14 lead late in the fourth quarter. Then, after losing two players simultaneously to injury and ahead still by two scores in the final seconds, Penn State coach Joe Paterno elected to insert on defense unpracticed third-stringers. Indiana subsequently scored on a deflected Hail Mary pass and two-point conversion with no time on the clock (after which the Hoosiers bizarrely celebrated, despite losing). Penn State had won 35–29, but due to the deceptively close score fell farther behind Nebraska in the next AP poll and now dropped to No. 2 in the Coaches poll as well. The PSU-Indiana game is often cited as the one pivotal point at which Nebraska passed Penn State, but in reality the Nittany Lions had already fallen to No. 2 in the AP poll a week prior to that despite doing nothing at all deserving of losing their No. 1 ranking.

== Other notes ==
After being played for the first two years at Legion Field in Birmingham, Alabama, the SEC Championship Game moved to its now-permanent home in Atlanta - first at the Georgia Dome, then at Mercedes-Benz Stadium. Meanwhile, in Jacksonville, the demolition and reconstruction of Gator Bowl Stadium that coincided with the Jacksonville Jaguars' entry into the NFL for 1995 forced the Gator Bowl to move to Ben Hill Griffin Stadium in Gainesville for its 1994 season edition. The game returned to Jacksonville in the newly built Jacksonville Municipal Stadium the following year. Also, John Hancock Insurance's deal for naming rights to the Sun Bowl expired and the game reverted to its former name.

Although Nebraska, Penn State and Alabama were still ranked in the Top 10, many of college football's legendary teams finished the regular season with their lowest rankings in years. Ohio State finished the season ranked 14th in the AP poll while Michigan was No. 20 and USC No. 21. Notre Dame, which started the season ranked fourth, finished the season unranked as did preseason No. 16 Oklahoma.

== Rule changes ==
Due to several fighting incidents that occurred during the 1993 season (including one between the Miami Hurricanes and the Colorado Buffaloes that resulted in 12 ejections), the following changes were made:

- Players involved in fighting on the field will draw a 15-yard penalty and an automatic ejection. If the ejection occurs in the first half, the player(s) will be disqualified for the remainder of the game. If the ejection occurs in the second half (or in overtime as of the 1996 season), the player(s) will be disqualified for the remainder of that game plus the first half of his team's next regularly scheduled game.
- Players leaving the bench to participate in fights will be ejected for the remainder of the game plus his team's entire next regularly scheduled game.
- Repeat offenders will be ejected and suspended for the remainder of the season.
- The officials' jurisdiction over games will begin 60 minutes before kickoff. Any pre-game fights or taunting will be penalized the same as if the fight/taunting occurred during the game, with any yardage penalties enforced on the opening kickoff. The officials' jurisdiction was extended to 90 minutes before kickoff starting with the 2020 season.
- The prohibition against the use of two-post goalposts is deleted, reversing a 1985 rule. LSU was allowed by the NCAA to place goals with two posts in Tiger Stadium late in the 1993 season in conjunction with its football centennial. Florida State and Washington State quickly followed suit.
- The use of officials from different conferences ("split crews") was outlawed, except for game contracts signed before January 1, 1994. The NCAA extended the ban to all games before the 1998 season.

== Regular season ==
=== August–September ===
The top five of the preseason AP Poll were No. 1 Florida, No. 2 Notre Dame, No. 3 Florida State, No. 4 Nebraska, and No. 5 Michigan. There was something of a lack of consensus at the top as each of the top four teams received at least ten first-place votes, with fourth-place Nebraska getting the most such votes.

August 28: No. 4 Nebraska shut out No. 24 West Virginia 31–0 in the Kickoff Classic. The other top teams had not begun their schedules, and the Cornhuskers moved up in the next poll: No. 1 Florida, No. 2 Nebraska, No. 3 Notre Dame, No. 4 Florida State, and No. 5 Michigan.

September 3: No. 1 Florida overwhelmed New Mexico State 70–21. No. 2 Nebraska was idle. No. 3 Notre Dame won 42–15 at Northwestern, and No. 4 Florida State beat Virginia 41–17. No. 5 Michigan defeated Boston College 34–26, but No. 6 Miami shut out Georgia Southern 56–0 and moved ahead of the Wolverines in the next poll. The voters also made a change at the top: No. 1 Nebraska, No. 2 Florida, No. 3 Notre Dame, No. 4 Florida State, and No. 5 Miami.

September 8–10: No. 1 Nebraska won 42–16 at Texas Tech while No. 2 Florida blew out Kentucky 73–7, leading the two teams to switch places again. After coming back to take the lead with less than a minute to play, No. 3 Notre Dame lost 26–24 to No. 6 Michigan on a field goal with two seconds left. No. 4 Florida State won 52–20 at Maryland, and No. 5 Miami defeated Arizona State 47–10. The next poll featured No. 1 Florida, No. 2 Nebraska, No. 3 Florida State, No. 4 Michigan, and No. 5 Miami.

September 17: No. 1 Florida visited No. 15 Tennessee and shut the Volunteers out 31–0, No. 2 Nebraska defeated No. 13 UCLA 49–21, and No. 3 Florida State won 56–14 at Wake Forest. No. 4 Michigan and No. 5 Miami were idle. No. 6 Penn State beat Iowa 61–21 and moved up in the next poll: No. 1 Florida, No. 2 Nebraska, No. 3 Florida State, No. 4 Michigan, and No. 5 Penn State.

September 24: No. 1 Florida was idle. No. 2 Nebraska defeated Pacific 70–21, but the Cornhuskers' star quarterback Tommie Frazier was sidelined for the rest of the regular season with blood clots in his calf. No. 3 Florida State beat No. 13 North Carolina 31–18. In the "Miracle at Michigan," No. 7 Colorado won 27–26 over No. 4 Michigan thanks to Kordell Stewart's 64-yard Hail Mary for a touchdown as time expired. No. 5 Penn State was a 55–27 winner over Rutgers. The next poll featured No. 1 Florida, No. 2 Nebraska, No. 3 Florida State, No. 4 Penn State, and No. 5 Colorado.

=== October ===
October 1: No. 1 Florida won 38–14 at Mississippi. With Brook Berringer taking over the quarterback duties from Frazier, No. 2 Nebraska got off to a slow start against Wyoming but eventually came away with a 42–32 victory. No. 3 Florida State was idle. No. 4 Penn State visited Temple for a 48–21 win. No. 5 Colorado pulled off a buzzer-beating play for the second week in a row, this time beating No. 16 Texas 34–31 on a field goal as time expired. The top five remained the same in the next poll.

October 8: No. 1 Florida defeated LSU 42–18, and No. 2 Nebraska opened Big Eight play with a 32–3 win over Oklahoma State. No. 3 Florida State visited No. 13 Miami with an unlucky result, as the Seminoles committed five turnovers on the way to a 34–20 loss. No. 4 Penn State was idle. No. 5 Colorado beat Missouri 38–23, and No. 7 Michigan won 40–20 over Michigan State. The next poll featured No. 1 Florida, No. 2 Nebraska, No. 3 Penn State, No. 4 Colorado, and No. 5 Michigan.

October 15: No. 1 Florida was upset 36–33 by No. 6 Auburn, who capitalized on a late interception to score the game-winning touchdown with 30 seconds left; it was the Gators' first home loss to a conference opponent in coach Steve Spurrier's five years with the team. No. 2 Nebraska defeated No. 16 Kansas State 17–6, No. 3 Penn State won a back-and-forth 31–24 matchup with No. 5 Michigan, and No. 4 Colorado beat No. 22 Oklahoma 45–7. The AP voters reshuffled the top teams in the next poll: No. 1 Penn State, No. 2 Colorado, No. 3 Nebraska, No. 4 Auburn, and No. 5 Florida.

October 22: No. 1 Penn State, No. 4 Auburn, and No. 5 Florida were all idle. No. 2 Colorado defeated No. 19 Kansas State 35–21, and No. 3 Nebraska won 42–7 at Missouri. The top five remained the same in the next poll.

October 29: No. 1 Penn State blew out No. 21 Ohio State 63–14, but the AP voters were more impressed by the performance of No. 3 Nebraska, who took control of the Big Eight race with a 24–7 defeat of No. 2 Colorado. No. 4 Auburn beat Arkansas 31–14, No. 5 Florida defeated Georgia 52–14, and No. 6 Miami won 24–3 over No. 13 Virginia Tech. The top five in the next AP Poll were No. 1 Nebraska, No. 2 Penn State, No. 3 Auburn, No. 4 Florida, and No. 5 Miami. Penn State remained at No. 1 in the Coaches Poll.

=== November–December ===
November 5: AP No. 1 Nebraska defeated Kansas 45–17. Coaches No. 1 Penn State held a decisive 35–14 lead at Indiana deep into the fourth quarter and appeared to score again on a long fumble return. The TD was negated, though, by a marginal face mask call. Indiana subsequently scored instead, and on the game's last play the Hoosiers tacked on a Hail Mary pass (and meaningless two-point conversion) to cut the final margin to a deceptively close 35–29, enough to knock Penn State from their No. 1 Coaches' ranking. No. 3 Auburn beat East Carolina 38–21, No. 4 Florida defeated Southern Mississippi 55–17, and No. 5 Miami won 27–6 at No. 10 Syracuse. The top five remained the same in the AP Poll, and Nebraska took over first place in the Coaches Poll as well.

November 12: No. 1 Nebraska won 28–12 at Iowa State to clinch the Big Eight title and an Orange Bowl berth. Meanwhile, No. 2 Penn State had a close call in their game at Illinois. The Nittany Lions trailed 21–0 at the end of the first quarter, but they mounted a comeback (including an epic late-game 96-yard drive) for a memorable 35–31 triumph, which earned them the Big Ten championship and a spot in the Rose Bowl. No. 3 Auburn brought a 20-game winning streak into their game against Georgia, but the Tigers missed a last-second field goal and had to settle for a 23–23 tie. No. 4 Florida beat South Carolina 48–17 to clinch the SEC Western Division title. No. 5 Miami defeated Pittsburgh 17–12, while No. 6 Alabama won 29–25 at No. 20 Mississippi State. The top five in the next poll were No. 1 Nebraska, No. 2 Penn State, No. 3 Florida, No. 4 Alabama, and No. 5 Miami.

November 19: No. 1 Nebraska was idle. No. 2 Penn State defeated Northwestern 45–17, and No. 3 Florida won 24–7 at Vanderbilt. No. 4 Alabama and No. 6 Auburn squared off in a battle for the SEC Western Division championship. Alabama was already assured of a spot in the SEC Championship Game because Auburn was barred from postseason play due to NCAA violations, and the Crimson Tide won the division title outright with a 21–14 triumph. No. 5 Miami beat Temple 38–14. The top five in the next poll were No. 1 Nebraska, No. 2 Penn State, No. 3 Alabama, No. 4 Florida, and No. 5 Miami.

November 25–26: No. 1 Nebraska won a defensive struggle against Oklahoma, 13–3, while No. 2 Penn State prevailed in a 59–31 shootout against Michigan State. No. 3 Alabama had finished their regular-season schedule. In the "Choke at Doak," No. 4 Florida entered the fourth quarter with a 31–3 lead over No. 7 Florida State, but the Seminoles scored 28 unanswered points (tying an NCAA record for the biggest fourth-quarter comeback of all time) to salvage a 31–31 tie. No. 5 Miami beat No. 25 Boston College 23–7. No. 6 Colorado had finished their schedule, but the Buffaloes still moved up in the next poll: No. 1 Nebraska, No. 2 Penn State, No. 3 Alabama, No. 4 Miami, and No. 5 Colorado.

December 3: The third annual SEC Championship Game featured the same teams as the first two, with undefeated No. 3 Alabama facing off against No. 6 Florida. The Crimson Tide had won in 1992 and the Gators prevailed in 1993, and the rubber match was a very close game. Alabama held a 23–17 lead in the fourth quarter, but Danny Wuerffel threw a touchdown pass to put Florida back up by a point, and the Gators closed out the game with an interception on Alabama's final drive. The final AP poll of the regular season featured No. 1 Nebraska, No. 2 Penn State, No. 3 Miami, No. 4 Colorado, and No. 5 Florida.

Alabama's loss in the SEC title game left Nebraska and Penn State as the only undefeated and untied teams in the nation. However, since they were the Big Ten champions, the Nittany Lions were required to play in the Rose Bowl against the Pac-10 winner, No. 12 Oregon. Therefore, Nebraska's opponent in the Orange Bowl would be third-ranked Miami. The other major bowls included a rematch between Florida and No. 7 Florida State in the Sugar Bowl and Colorado against Notre Dame in the Fiesta Bowl. No. 8 Texas A&M finished with a 10–0–1 record and easily won the SWC title, but the Aggies were on probation and ineligible for postseason play. Texas Tech, who finished in a five-way tie for second place and sported a less-impressive 6–5 record, replaced A&M in the Cotton Bowl against No. 21 USC.

== Conference standings ==
1994 Atlantic Coast Conference football standings
	Conf.					Overall
Team	W		L		T	W		L		T
No. 4 Florida State $	8	–	0	–	0	10	–	1	–	1
No. 17 NC State	6	–	2	–	0	9	–	3	–	0
No. 15 Virginia	5	–	3	–	0	9	–	3	–	0
Duke	5	–	3	–	0	8	–	4	–	0
North Carolina	5	–	3	–	0	8	–	4	–	0
Clemson	4	–	4	–	0	5	–	6	–	0
Maryland	2	–	6	–	0	4	–	7	–	0
Wake Forest	1	–	7	–	0	3	–	8	–	0
Georgia Tech	0	–	8	–	0	1	–	10	–	0
$ – Conference champion; Rankings from AP Poll

1994 Big East Conference football standings
	Conf.					Overall
Team	W		L		T	W		L		T
No. 6 Miami (FL) $	7	–	0	–	0	10	–	2	–	0
Virginia Tech	5	–	2	–	0	8	–	4	–	0
Syracuse	4	–	3	–	0	7	–	4	–	0
West Virginia	4	–	3	–	0	7	–	6	–	0
No. 23 Boston College	3	–	3	–	1	7	–	4	–	1
Rutgers	2	–	4	–	1	5	–	5	–	1
Pittsburgh	2	–	5	–	0	3	–	8	–	0
Temple	0	–	7	–	0	2	–	9	–	0
$ – Conference champion; Rankings from AP Poll

1994 Big Eight Conference football standings
	Conf.					Overall
Team	W		L		T	W		L		T
No. 1 Nebraska $	7	–	0	–	0	13	–	0	–	0
No. 3 Colorado %	6	–	1	–	0	11	–	1	–	0
No. 19 Kansas State	5	–	2	–	0	9	–	3	–	0
Oklahoma	4	–	3	–	0	6	–	6	–	0
Kansas	3	–	4	–	0	6	–	5	–	0
Missouri	2	–	5	–	0	3	–	8	–	1
Oklahoma State	0	–	6	–	1	3	–	7	–	1
Iowa State	0	–	6	–	1	0	–	10	–	1
$ – Bowl Coalition representative as champion % – Bowl Coalition at-large representative; Rankings from AP Poll

1994 Big Ten Conference football standings
	Conf.					Overall
Team	W		L		T	W		L		T
No. 2 Penn State $	8	–	0	–	0	12	–	0	–	0
No. 14 Ohio State	6	–	2	–	0	9	–	4	–	0
Wisconsin	5	–	2	–	1	8	–	3	–	1
No. 12 Michigan	5	–	3	–	0	8	–	4	–	0
Illinois	4	–	4	–	0	7	–	5	–	0
Purdue	3	–	3	–	2	5	–	4	–	2
Iowa	3	–	4	–	1	5	–	5	–	1
Indiana	3	–	5	–	0	6	–	5	–	0
Northwestern	3	–	5	–	0	4	–	6	–	1
Minnesota	1	–	7	–	0	3	–	8	–	0
Michigan State †	0	–	8	–	0	0	–	11	–	0
$ – Conference champion; † Michigan State forfeited 5 wins including 4 conference victories, over Wisconsin, Indiana, Northwestern, and Purdue.; Rankings from AP Poll

1994 Big West Conference football standings
	Conf.					Overall
Team	W		L		T	W		L		T
Nevada +	5	–	1	–	0	9	–	2	–	0
UNLV +	5	–	1	–	0	7	–	5	–	0
Southwestern Louisiana +	5	–	1	–	0	6	–	5	–	0
Pacific (CA)	4	–	2	–	0	6	–	5	–	0
Northern Illinois	3	–	3	–	0	4	–	7	–	0
San Jose State	3	–	3	–	0	3	–	8	–	0
Utah State	2	–	4	–	0	3	–	8	–	0
New Mexico State	2	–	4	–	0	3	–	8	–	0
Louisiana Tech	1	–	5	–	0	3	–	8	–	0
Arkansas State	0	–	6	–	0	1	–	10	–	0
+ – Conference co-champions

1994 Mid-American Conference football standings
	Conf.					Overall
Team	W		L		T	W		L		T
Central Michigan $	8	–	1	–	0	9	–	3	–	0
Bowling Green	7	–	1	–	0	9	–	2	–	0
Western Michigan	5	–	3	–	0	7	–	4	–	0
Miami (OH)	5	–	3	–	0	5	–	5	–	1
Ball State	5	–	3	–	1	5	–	5	–	1
Toledo	4	–	3	–	1	6	–	4	–	1
Eastern Michigan	5	–	4	–	0	5	–	6	–	0
Kent State	2	–	7	–	0	2	–	9	–	0
Akron	1	–	8	–	0	1	–	10	–	0
Ohio	0	–	9	–	0	0	–	11	–	0
$ – Conference champion

1994 Pacific-10 Conference football standings
	Conf.					Overall
Team	W		L		T	W		L		T
No. 11 Oregon $	7	–	1	–	0	9	–	4	–	0
No. 13 USC	6	–	2	–	0	8	–	3	–	1
No. 20 Arizona	6	–	2	–	0	8	–	4	–	0
No. 21 Washington State	5	–	3	–	0	8	–	4	–	0
Washington	4	–	4	–	0	7	–	4	–	0
UCLA	3	–	5	–	0	5	–	6	–	0
California	3	–	5	–	0	4	–	7	–	0
Oregon State	2	–	6	–	0	4	–	7	–	0
Stanford	2	–	6	–	0	3	–	7	–	1
Arizona State	2	–	6	–	0	3	–	8	–	0
$ – Conference champion; Rankings from AP Poll

1994 Southeastern Conference football standings
	Conf.					Overall
Team	W		L		T	W		L		T
Eastern Division
No. 7 Florida x$	7	–	1	–	0	10	–	2	–	1
No. 22 Tennessee	5	–	3	–	0	8	–	4	–	0
South Carolina	4	–	4	–	0	7	–	5	–	0
Georgia	3	–	4	–	1	6	–	4	–	1
Vanderbilt	2	–	6	–	0	5	–	6	–	0
Kentucky	0	–	8	–	0	1	–	10	–	0
Western Division
No. 5 Alabama x	8	–	0	–	0	12	–	1	–	0
No. 9 Auburn	6	–	1	–	1	9	–	1	–	1
No. 24 Mississippi State	5	–	3	–	0	8	–	4	–	0
LSU	3	–	5	–	0	4	–	7	–	0
Arkansas	2	–	6	–	0	4	–	7	–	0
Ole Miss	2	–	6	–	0	4	–	7	–	0
Championship: Florida 24, Alabama 23
$ – Conference champion; x – Division champion/co-champions; Rankings from AP Poll

1994 Southwest Conference football standings
	Conf.					Overall
Team	W		L		T	W		L		T
No. 8 Texas A&M *	6	–	0	–	1	10	–	0	–	1
No. 25 Texas +	4	–	3	–	0	8	–	4	–	0
Baylor +	4	–	3	–	0	7	–	5	–	0
TCU +	4	–	3	–	0	7	–	5	–	0
Texas Tech +	4	–	3	–	0	6	–	6	–	0
Rice +	4	–	3	–	0	5	–	6	–	0
Houston	1	–	6	–	0	1	–	10	–	0
SMU	0	–	6	–	1	1	–	9	–	1
+ – Conference co-champions; * – ineligible for championship and postseason due to NCAA sanctions; Rankings from AP Poll

1994 Western Athletic Conference football standings
	Conf.					Overall
Team	W		L		T	W		L		T
No. 16 Colorado State $	7	–	1	–	0	10	–	2	–	0
No. 10 Utah	6	–	2	–	0	10	–	2	–	0
No. 18 BYU	6	–	2	–	0	10	–	3	–	0
Air Force	6	–	2	–	0	8	–	4	–	0
Wyoming	4	–	4	–	0	6	–	6	–	0
New Mexico	4	–	4	–	0	5	–	7	–	0
Fresno State	3	–	4	–	1	5	–	7	–	1
San Diego State	2	–	6	–	0	4	–	7	–	0
UTEP	1	–	6	–	1	3	–	7	–	1
Hawaii	0	–	8	–	0	3	–	8	–	1
$ – Conference champion; Rankings from AP Poll

1994 NCAA Division I-A independents football records
	Conf.			Overall
Team	W	L	T	W		L		T
East Carolina		–		7	–	5	–	0
Louisville		–		6	–	5	–	0
Memphis		–		6	–	5	–	0
Southern Miss		–		6	–	5	–	0
Notre Dame		–		6	–	5	–	1
Army		–		4	–	7	–	0
Northeast Louisiana		–		3	–	8	–	0
Navy		–		3	–	8	–	0
Tulsa		–		3	–	8	–	0
Cincinnati		–		2	–	8	–	1
Tulane		–		1	–	10	–	0
Rankings from AP Poll

== I-AA team wins over I-A teams ==
Date	Visiting team	Home team	Site	Result	Attendance	Ref.
September 3	No. 8 (I-AA) Northern Iowa	Iowa State	Cyclone Stadium • Ames, Iowa	28–14	40,295	
September 17	Nevada	Boise State	Bronco Stadium • Boise, Idaho (rivalry)	27–37	21,669	
September 17	No. 6 (I-AA) Idaho	UNLV	Sam Boyd Stadium • Whitney, Nevada	48–38	8,820	
September 17	No. 5 (I-AA) Troy State	Southwestern Louisiana	Cajun Field • Lafayette, Louisiana	39–20		
October 15	No. 15 (I-AA) UCF	Northeast Louisiana	Malone Stadium • Monroe, Louisiana	33–16	8,123	
October 15	Kent State	No. 3 (I-AA) Youngstown State	Stambaugh Stadium • Youngstown, Ohio	14–28	14,672	
November 5	Eastern Washington	Utah State	Romney Stadium • Logan, Utah	49–31	10,211	
November 12	No. 7 (I-AA) Boston University	Army	Michie Stadium • West Point, New York	21–12	33,762	
^{#}Rankings from AP Poll released prior to game.

=== Division II team wins over I-A teams ===
Italics denotes D-II teams.

Date	Visiting team	Home team	Site	Result	Attendance	Ref.
October 22	Jacksonville State	Northeast Louisiana	Malone Stadium • Monroe, Louisiana	32–28	17,101	
^{#}Rankings from AP Poll released prior to game.

== Bowl Coalition No. 1 and No. 2 ==
The Bowl Coalition did not include the Big 10 and Pacific-10 conferences, whose champions played in the Rose Bowl. Penn State, which was ranked No. 1 in the October 18 and October 25 polls, and No. 2 for the remainder of the season, finished the regular season 11–0–0 and played in the Rose Bowl as the champion of the Big Ten.

WEEKS	First	Conference	Second	Conference
PRE	Florida	SEC	Notre Dame	Independent
1	Florida	SEC	Nebraska	Big Eight
2	Nebraska	Big Eight	Florida	SEC
3-7	Florida	SEC	Nebraska	Big Eight
8-9	No. 2 Colorado	Big Eight	No. 3 Nebraska	Big Eight
10-11	Nebraska	Big Eight	No. 3 Auburn	SEC
12	Nebraska	Big Eight	No. 3 Florida	SEC
13–14	Nebraska	Big Eight	No. 3 Alabama	SEC
15	Nebraska	Big Eight	No. 3 Miami	Big East

== Bowl games ==
- Orange Bowl: No. 1 Nebraska 24, No. 3 Miami 17
- Rose Bowl: No. 2 Penn State 38, No. 12 Oregon 20
- Sugar Bowl: No. 7 Florida State 23, No. 5 Florida 17
- Cotton Bowl Classic: No. 21 USC 55, Texas Tech 14
- Fiesta Bowl: No. 4 Colorado 41, Notre Dame 24
- Peach Bowl: No. 23 NC State 28, No. 16 Mississippi State 24
- Florida Citrus Bowl: No. 6 Alabama 24, No. 13 Ohio State 17
- Hall of Fame Bowl: Wisconsin 34, No. 25 Duke 20
- Carquest Bowl: South Carolina 24, West Virginia 21
- Sun Bowl: Texas 35, No. 18 North Carolina 31
- Gator Bowl: Tennessee 45, No. 17 Virginia Tech 23
- Copper Bowl: No. 22 BYU 31, Oklahoma 6
- Alamo Bowl: No. 24 Washington State 10, Baylor 3
- Holiday Bowl: No. 20 Michigan 24, No. 10 Colorado State 14
- Freedom Bowl: No. 14 Utah 16, No. 15 Arizona 13
- Liberty Bowl: Illinois 30, East Carolina 0
- Aloha Bowl: Boston College 12, No. 11 Kansas State 7
- Independence Bowl: No. 18 Virginia 20, TCU 10
- Las Vegas Bowl: UNLV 52, Central Michigan 24

== Final AP Poll ==
1. Nebraska
2. Penn State
3. Colorado
4. Florida State
5. Alabama
6. Miami (FL)
7. Florida
8. Texas A&M
9. Auburn
10. Utah
11. Oregon
12. Michigan
13. USC
14. Ohio State
15. Virginia
16. Colorado State
17. N.C. State
18. BYU
19. Kansas State
20. Arizona
21. Washington State
22. Tennessee
23. Boston College
24. Mississippi State
25. Texas

== Final Coaches Poll ==
1. Nebraska
2. Penn State
3. Colorado
4. Alabama
5. Florida State
6. Miami (FL)
7. Florida
8. Utah
9. Ohio St.
10. Brigham Young
11. Oregon
12. Michigan
13. Virginia
14. Colorado State
15. Southern California
16. Kansas State
17. North Carolina State
18. Tennessee
19. Washington State
20. Arizona
21. North Carolina
22. Boston College
23. Texas
24. Virginia Tech
25. Mississippi State

== Heisman Trophy voting ==
The Heisman Memorial Trophy Award is given to the Most Outstanding Player of the year

Player	School	Position	1st	2nd	3rd	Total
Rashaan Salaam	Colorado	RB	400	229	85	1,743
Ki-Jana Carter	Penn State	RB	115	205	146	901
Steve McNair	Alcorn State	QB	111	85	152	655
Kerry Collins	Penn State	QB	101	117	102	639
Jay Barker	Alabama	QB	36	58	71	295
Warren Sapp	Miami (FL)	DT	17	37	67	192
Eric Zeier	Georgia	QB	7	15	32	83
Lawrence Phillips	Nebraska	RB	1	8	21	40
Napoleon Kaufman	Washington	RB	3	3	12	27
Zach Wiegert	Nebraska	OT	1	7	10	27

McNair's nomination as a finalist was a rare feat, as Alcorn State was a member of Division I-AA and I-AA awarded the Walter Payton Award to its most outstanding player (which McNair won).

== Other major awards ==
- Maxwell Award (College Player of the Year) – Kerry Collins, Penn State
- Walter Camp Award (Back) – Rashaan Salaam, Colorado
- Davey O'Brien Award (Quarterback) – Kerry Collins, Penn State
- Doak Walker Award (Running Back) – Rashaan Salaam, Colorado
- Dick Butkus Award (Linebacker) – Dana Howard, Illinois
- Lombardi Award (Lineman or Linebacker) – Warren Sapp, Miami
- Outland Trophy (Interior Lineman) – Zach Wiegert, OT, Nebraska
- Jim Thorpe Award (Defensive Back) – Chris Hudson, Colorado
- AFCA Coach of the Year – Tom Osborne, Nebraska
- FWAA Coach of the Year – Joe Paterno, Penn State
- Paul "Bear" Bryant Award – Rich Brooks, Oregon

== Attendances ==
Average home attendance top 3:

Rank	Team	Average
1	Michigan Wolverines	106,217
2	Penn State Nittany Lions	96,289
3	Tennessee Volunteers	95,637
