= Tony Veland =

American football player and coach (born 1973)

No. 32, 36
- Position: Safety

Personal information
- Born: March 11, 1973 (age 53); Omaha, Nebraska, U.S.
- Listed height: 6 ft 1 in (1.85 m)
- Listed weight: 209 lb (95 kg)

Career information
- High school: Omaha Benson
- College: Nebraska
- NFL draft: 1996: 6th round, 181st overall pick

Career history

Playing
- Denver Broncos (1996–1997); Carolina Panthers (1998); Lincoln Lightning (2000-2002); Omaha Beef (2003)

Coaching
- Omaha Beef (2008–2013) Defensive coordinator

Awards and highlights
- Super Bowl champion (XXXII); 2× National champion (1994, 1995); Second-team All-Big Eight (1995)

Career NFL statistics
- Tackles: 23
- Interceptions: 1
- Forced fumbles: 1
- Stats at Pro Football Reference

Tony Veland (born March 11, 1973) is an American former professional football player who was a defensive back for the Denver Broncos and the Carolina Panthers of the National Football League (NFL). He played college football for the Nebraska Cornhuskers.

Veland was a member of the 1994 and 1995 Nebraska national championship teams. The Broncos selected Veland in the sixth round of the 1996 NFL draft. Veland won a ring as a member of the Denver Broncos Super Bowl XXXII championship team in 1997 over the Green Bay Packers and ended his NFL playing career in 1998 with the Carolina Panthers. He would continue to play professional indoor football for the Lincoln Lightning and the Omaha Beef. Veland went on to become the defensive coordinator of the Omaha Beef of United Indoor Football. He spent six seasons coaching the Beef.

He was shot on the night of June 13, 2011, as he sat in his vehicle and was admitted to Creighton University Medical Center.
