= List of Western Athletic Conference football standings =

This is a list of yearly Western Athletic Conference football standings.

== WAC standings ==
1962 Western Athletic Conference football standings
| | Conf. | | | | | Overall |
| Team | W | | L | | T | W | | L | | T |
|---|---|---|---|---|---|---|---|---|---|---|
| New Mexico $ | 2 | – | 1 | – | 1 | 7 | – | 2 | – | 1 |
| Arizona State | 1 | – | 1 | – | 0 | 7 | – | 2 | – | 1 |
| Arizona | 2 | – | 2 | – | 0 | 5 | – | 5 | – | 0 |
| Wyoming | 2 | – | 2 | – | 0 | 5 | – | 5 | – | 0 |
| BYU | 2 | – | 2 | – | 0 | 4 | – | 6 | – | 0 |
| Utah | 1 | – | 2 | – | 1 | 4 | – | 5 | – | 1 |
$ – Conference champion

1963 Western Athletic Conference football standings
| | Conf. | | | | | Overall |
| Team | W | | L | | T | W | | L | | T |
|---|---|---|---|---|---|---|---|---|---|---|
| Arizona State * | 3 | – | 0 | – | 0 | 8 | – | 1 | – | 0 |
| New Mexico $ | 3 | – | 1 | – | 0 | 6 | – | 4 | – | 0 |
| Arizona | 2 | – | 2 | – | 0 | 5 | – | 5 | – | 0 |
| Utah | 2 | – | 2 | – | 0 | 4 | – | 6 | – | 0 |
| Wyoming | 2 | – | 3 | – | 0 | 6 | – | 4 | – | 0 |
| BYU | 0 | – | 4 | – | 0 | 2 | – | 8 | – | 0 |
$ – Conference champion; * – Ineligible for conference title due to playing fewer than qualifying number of games

1964 Western Athletic Conference football standings
| | Conf. | | | | | Overall |
| Team | W | | L | | T | W | | L | | T |
|---|---|---|---|---|---|---|---|---|---|---|
| New Mexico + | 3 | – | 1 | – | 0 | 9 | – | 2 | – | 0 |
| Utah + | 3 | – | 1 | – | 0 | 9 | – | 2 | – | 0 |
| Arizona + | 3 | – | 1 | – | 0 | 6 | – | 3 | – | 1 |
| Wyoming | 2 | – | 2 | – | 0 | 6 | – | 2 | – | 2 |
| Arizona State | 0 | – | 2 | – | 0 | 8 | – | 2 | – | 0 |
| BYU | 0 | – | 4 | – | 0 | 3 | – | 6 | – | 1 |
+ – Conference co-champions

1965 Western Athletic Conference football standings
| | Conf. | | | | | Overall |
| Team | W | | L | | T | W | | L | | T |
|---|---|---|---|---|---|---|---|---|---|---|
| BYU $ | 4 | – | 1 | – | 0 | 6 | – | 4 | – | 0 |
| Arizona State | 3 | – | 1 | – | 0 | 6 | – | 4 | – | 0 |
| Wyoming | 3 | – | 2 | – | 0 | 6 | – | 4 | – | 0 |
| New Mexico | 2 | – | 3 | – | 0 | 3 | – | 7 | – | 0 |
| Utah | 1 | – | 3 | – | 0 | 3 | – | 7 | – | 0 |
| Arizona | 1 | – | 4 | – | 0 | 3 | – | 7 | – | 0 |
$ – Conference champion

1966 Western Athletic Conference football standings
| | Conf. | | | | | Overall |
| Team | W | | L | | T | W | | L | | T |
|---|---|---|---|---|---|---|---|---|---|---|
| Wyoming $ | 5 | – | 0 | – | 0 | 10 | – | 1 | – | 0 |
| BYU | 3 | – | 2 | – | 0 | 8 | – | 2 | – | 0 |
| Arizona State | 3 | – | 2 | – | 0 | 5 | – | 5 | – | 0 |
| Utah | 3 | – | 2 | – | 0 | 5 | – | 5 | – | 0 |
| Arizona | 1 | – | 4 | – | 0 | 3 | – | 7 | – | 0 |
| New Mexico | 0 | – | 5 | – | 0 | 2 | – | 8 | – | 0 |
$ – Conference champion

1967 Western Athletic Conference football standings
| | Conf. | | | | | Overall |
| Team | W | | L | | T | W | | L | | T |
|---|---|---|---|---|---|---|---|---|---|---|
| No. 6 Wyoming $ | 5 | – | 0 | – | 0 | 10 | – | 1 | – | 0 |
| Arizona State | 4 | – | 1 | – | 0 | 8 | – | 2 | – | 0 |
| BYU | 3 | – | 2 | – | 0 | 6 | – | 4 | – | 0 |
| Utah | 2 | – | 3 | – | 0 | 4 | – | 7 | – | 0 |
| Arizona | 1 | – | 4 | – | 0 | 3 | – | 6 | – | 1 |
| New Mexico | 0 | – | 5 | – | 0 | 1 | – | 9 | – | 0 |
$ – Conference champion; Rankings from AP Poll

1968 Western Athletic Conference football standings
| | Conf. | | | | | Overall |
| Team | W | | L | | T | W | | L | | T |
|---|---|---|---|---|---|---|---|---|---|---|
| Wyoming $ | 6 | – | 1 | – | 0 | 7 | – | 3 | – | 0 |
| Arizona State | 5 | – | 1 | – | 0 | 8 | – | 2 | – | 0 |
| Arizona | 5 | – | 1 | – | 0 | 8 | – | 3 | – | 0 |
| UTEP | 3 | – | 3 | – | 0 | 4 | – | 5 | – | 1 |
| Utah | 2 | – | 3 | – | 0 | 3 | – | 7 | – | 0 |
| Colorado State * | 1 | – | 4 | – | 0 | 2 | – | 8 | – | 0 |
| BYU | 1 | – | 5 | – | 0 | 2 | – | 8 | – | 0 |
| New Mexico | 0 | – | 7 | – | 0 | 0 | – | 10 | – | 0 |
$ – Conference champion; * Games against Texas Tech and Air Force counted in the conference standings.

1969 Western Athletic Conference football standings
| | Conf. | | | | | Overall |
| Team | W | | L | | T | W | | L | | T |
|---|---|---|---|---|---|---|---|---|---|---|
| Arizona State $ | 6 | – | 1 | – | 0 | 8 | – | 2 | – | 0 |
| Utah | 5 | – | 1 | – | 0 | 8 | – | 2 | – | 0 |
| BYU | 4 | – | 3 | – | 0 | 6 | – | 4 | – | 0 |
| Wyoming | 4 | – | 3 | – | 0 | 6 | – | 4 | – | 0 |
| Arizona | 3 | – | 3 | – | 0 | 3 | – | 7 | – | 0 |
| UTEP | 2 | – | 5 | – | 0 | 4 | – | 6 | – | 0 |
| New Mexico | 1 | – | 5 | – | 0 | 4 | – | 6 | – | 0 |
| Colorado State | 0 | – | 4 | – | 0 | 4 | – | 6 | – | 0 |
$ – Conference champion

1970 Western Athletic Conference football standings
| | Conf. | | | | | Overall |
| Team | W | | L | | T | W | | L | | T |
|---|---|---|---|---|---|---|---|---|---|---|
| No. 6 Arizona State $ | 7 | – | 0 | – | 0 | 11 | – | 0 | – | 0 |
| New Mexico | 5 | – | 1 | – | 0 | 7 | – | 3 | – | 0 |
| Utah | 4 | – | 2 | – | 0 | 6 | – | 4 | – | 0 |
| UTEP | 4 | – | 3 | – | 0 | 6 | – | 4 | – | 0 |
| Arizona | 2 | – | 4 | – | 0 | 4 | – | 6 | – | 0 |
| Colorado State | 1 | – | 3 | – | 0 | 4 | – | 7 | – | 0 |
| BYU | 1 | – | 6 | – | 0 | 3 | – | 8 | – | 0 |
| Wyoming | 1 | – | 6 | – | 0 | 1 | – | 9 | – | 0 |
$ – Conference champion; Rankings from AP Poll

1971 Western Athletic Conference football standings
| | Conf. | | | | | Overall |
| Team | W | | L | | T | W | | L | | T |
|---|---|---|---|---|---|---|---|---|---|---|
| No. 8 Arizona State $ | 7 | – | 0 | – | 0 | 11 | – | 1 | – | 0 |
| New Mexico | 5 | – | 1 | – | 0 | 6 | – | 3 | – | 2 |
| Arizona | 3 | – | 3 | – | 0 | 5 | – | 6 | – | 0 |
| BYU | 3 | – | 4 | – | 0 | 5 | – | 6 | – | 0 |
| Wyoming | 3 | – | 4 | – | 0 | 5 | – | 6 | – | 0 |
| Utah | 3 | – | 4 | – | 0 | 3 | – | 8 | – | 0 |
| Colorado State | 1 | – | 4 | – | 0 | 3 | – | 8 | – | 0 |
| UTEP | 1 | – | 6 | – | 0 | 5 | – | 6 | – | 0 |
$ – Conference champion; Rankings from AP Poll

1972 Western Athletic Conference football standings
| | Conf. | | | | | Overall |
| Team | W | | L | | T | W | | L | | T |
|---|---|---|---|---|---|---|---|---|---|---|
| No. 13 Arizona State $ | 5 | – | 1 | – | 0 | 10 | – | 2 | – | 0 |
| BYU | 5 | – | 2 | – | 0 | 7 | – | 4 | – | 0 |
| Utah | 5 | – | 2 | – | 0 | 6 | – | 5 | – | 0 |
| Arizona | 4 | – | 3 | – | 0 | 4 | – | 7 | – | 0 |
| Wyoming | 3 | – | 4 | – | 0 | 4 | – | 7 | – | 0 |
| New Mexico | 2 | – | 4 | – | 0 | 3 | – | 8 | – | 0 |
| Colorado State | 1 | – | 4 | – | 0 | 1 | – | 10 | – | 0 |
| UTEP | 1 | – | 6 | – | 0 | 2 | – | 8 | – | 0 |
$ – Conference champion; Rankings from AP Poll

1973 Western Athletic Conference football standings
| | Conf. | | | | | Overall |
| Team | W | | L | | T | W | | L | | T |
|---|---|---|---|---|---|---|---|---|---|---|
| No. 9 Arizona State + | 6 | – | 1 | – | 0 | 11 | – | 1 | – | 0 |
| Arizona + | 6 | – | 1 | – | 0 | 8 | – | 3 | – | 0 |
| Utah | 4 | – | 2 | – | 0 | 7 | – | 5 | – | 0 |
| BYU | 3 | – | 4 | – | 0 | 5 | – | 6 | – | 0 |
| New Mexico | 3 | – | 4 | – | 0 | 4 | – | 7 | – | 0 |
| Wyoming | 3 | – | 4 | – | 0 | 4 | – | 7 | – | 0 |
| Colorado State | 2 | – | 4 | – | 0 | 5 | – | 6 | – | 0 |
| UTEP | 0 | – | 7 | – | 0 | 0 | – | 11 | – | 0 |
+ – Conference co-champions; Rankings from AP Poll

1974 Western Athletic Conference football standings
| | Conf. | | | | | Overall |
| Team | W | | L | | T | W | | L | | T |
|---|---|---|---|---|---|---|---|---|---|---|
| BYU $ | 6 | – | 0 | – | 1 | 7 | – | 4 | – | 1 |
| Arizona | 6 | – | 1 | – | 0 | 9 | – | 2 | – | 0 |
| Arizona State | 4 | – | 3 | – | 0 | 7 | – | 5 | – | 0 |
| New Mexico | 3 | – | 4 | – | 0 | 4 | – | 6 | – | 1 |
| UTEP | 3 | – | 4 | – | 0 | 4 | – | 7 | – | 0 |
| Colorado State | 2 | – | 3 | – | 1 | 4 | – | 6 | – | 1 |
| Utah | 1 | – | 5 | – | 0 | 1 | – | 10 | – | 0 |
| Wyoming | 1 | – | 6 | – | 0 | 2 | – | 9 | – | 0 |
$ – Conference champion

1975 Western Athletic Conference football standings
| | Conf. | | | | | Overall |
| Team | W | | L | | T | W | | L | | T |
|---|---|---|---|---|---|---|---|---|---|---|
| No. 2 Arizona State $ | 7 | – | 0 | – | 0 | 12 | – | 0 | – | 0 |
| No. 18 Arizona | 5 | – | 2 | – | 0 | 9 | – | 2 | – | 0 |
| Colorado State | 4 | – | 2 | – | 0 | 6 | – | 5 | – | 0 |
| BYU | 4 | – | 3 | – | 0 | 6 | – | 5 | – | 0 |
| New Mexico | 4 | – | 3 | – | 0 | 6 | – | 5 | – | 0 |
| Utah | 1 | – | 4 | – | 0 | 1 | – | 10 | – | 0 |
| Wyoming | 1 | – | 6 | – | 0 | 2 | – | 9 | – | 0 |
| UTEP | 0 | – | 6 | – | 0 | 1 | – | 10 | – | 0 |
$ – Conference champion; Rankings from AP Poll

1976 Western Athletic Conference football standings
| | Conf. | | | | | Overall |
| Team | W | | L | | T | W | | L | | T |
|---|---|---|---|---|---|---|---|---|---|---|
| BYU + | 6 | – | 1 | – | 0 | 9 | – | 3 | – | 0 |
| Wyoming + | 6 | – | 1 | – | 0 | 8 | – | 4 | – | 0 |
| Arizona State | 4 | – | 3 | – | 0 | 4 | – | 7 | – | 0 |
| Utah | 3 | – | 3 | – | 0 | 3 | – | 8 | – | 0 |
| Arizona | 3 | – | 4 | – | 0 | 5 | – | 6 | – | 0 |
| New Mexico | 3 | – | 4 | – | 0 | 4 | – | 7 | – | 0 |
| Colorado State | 2 | – | 4 | – | 0 | 6 | – | 5 | – | 0 |
| UTEP | 0 | – | 7 | – | 0 | 1 | – | 11 | – | 0 |
+ – Conference co-champions

1977 Western Athletic Conference football standings
| | Conf. | | | | | Overall |
| Team | W | | L | | T | W | | L | | T |
|---|---|---|---|---|---|---|---|---|---|---|
| No. 20 BYU + | 6 | – | 1 | – | 0 | 9 | – | 2 | – | 0 |
| No. 18 Arizona State + | 6 | – | 1 | – | 0 | 9 | – | 3 | – | 0 |
| Colorado State | 5 | – | 2 | – | 0 | 9 | – | 2 | – | 1 |
| Wyoming | 4 | – | 3 | – | 0 | 4 | – | 6 | – | 1 |
| Arizona | 3 | – | 4 | – | 0 | 5 | – | 7 | – | 0 |
| New Mexico | 2 | – | 5 | – | 0 | 5 | – | 7 | – | 0 |
| Utah | 2 | – | 5 | – | 0 | 3 | – | 8 | – | 0 |
| UTEP | 0 | – | 7 | – | 0 | 1 | – | 10 | – | 0 |
+ – Conference co-champions; Rankings from AP Poll

1978 Western Athletic Conference football standings
| | Conf. | | | | | Overall |
| Team | W | | L | | T | W | | L | | T |
|---|---|---|---|---|---|---|---|---|---|---|
| BYU $ | 5 | – | 1 | – | 0 | 9 | – | 4 | – | 0 |
| Utah | 4 | – | 2 | – | 0 | 8 | – | 3 | – | 0 |
| Wyoming | 4 | – | 2 | – | 0 | 5 | – | 7 | – | 0 |
| New Mexico | 3 | – | 3 | – | 0 | 7 | – | 5 | – | 0 |
| Colorado State | 2 | – | 4 | – | 0 | 5 | – | 6 | – | 0 |
| San Diego State | 2 | – | 4 | – | 0 | 4 | – | 7 | – | 0 |
| UTEP | 1 | – | 5 | – | 0 | 1 | – | 11 | – | 0 |
$ – Conference champion

1979 Western Athletic Conference football standings
| | Conf. | | | | | Overall |
| Team | W | | L | | T | W | | L | | T |
|---|---|---|---|---|---|---|---|---|---|---|
| No. 13 BYU $ | 7 | – | 0 | – | 0 | 11 | – | 1 | – | 0 |
| Utah | 5 | – | 2 | – | 0 | 6 | – | 6 | – | 0 |
| San Diego State | 4 | – | 2 | – | 0 | 8 | – | 3 | – | 0 |
| Hawaii | 3 | – | 3 | – | 0 | 6 | – | 5 | – | 0 |
| New Mexico | 3 | – | 4 | – | 0 | 6 | – | 6 | – | 0 |
| Colorado State | 3 | – | 4 | – | 0 | 4 | – | 7 | – | 1 |
| Wyoming | 2 | – | 5 | – | 0 | 4 | – | 8 | – | 0 |
| UTEP | 0 | – | 7 | – | 0 | 2 | – | 9 | – | 0 |
$ – Conference champion; Rankings from AP Poll

1980 Western Athletic Conference football standings
| | Conf. | | | | | Overall |
| Team | W | | L | | T | W | | L | | T |
|---|---|---|---|---|---|---|---|---|---|---|
| No. 12 BYU $ | 6 | – | 1 | – | 0 | 12 | – | 1 | – | 0 |
| Colorado State | 5 | – | 1 | – | 1 | 6 | – | 4 | – | 1 |
| Hawaii | 3 | – | 3 | – | 0 | 8 | – | 3 | – | 0 |
| Wyoming | 4 | – | 4 | – | 0 | 6 | – | 5 | – | 0 |
| San Diego State | 4 | – | 4 | – | 0 | 4 | – | 8 | – | 0 |
| New Mexico | 3 | – | 4 | – | 0 | 4 | – | 7 | – | 0 |
| Utah | 2 | – | 3 | – | 1 | 5 | – | 5 | – | 1 |
| Air Force | 1 | – | 3 | – | 0 | 2 | – | 9 | – | 1 |
| UTEP | 1 | – | 6 | – | 0 | 1 | – | 11 | – | 0 |
$ – Conference champion; Rankings from AP Poll

1981 Western Athletic Conference football standings
| | Conf. | | | | | Overall |
| Team | W | | L | | T | W | | L | | T |
|---|---|---|---|---|---|---|---|---|---|---|
| No. 13 BYU $ | 7 | – | 1 | – | 0 | 11 | – | 2 | – | 0 |
| Hawaii | 5 | – | 1 | – | 0 | 9 | – | 2 | – | 0 |
| Utah | 4 | – | 1 | – | 1 | 8 | – | 2 | – | 1 |
| Wyoming | 6 | – | 2 | – | 0 | 8 | – | 3 | – | 0 |
| New Mexico | 3 | – | 4 | – | 1 | 4 | – | 7 | – | 1 |
| Air Force | 2 | – | 3 | – | 0 | 4 | – | 7 | – | 0 |
| San Diego State | 3 | – | 5 | – | 0 | 6 | – | 5 | – | 0 |
| UTEP | 1 | – | 6 | – | 0 | 1 | – | 10 | – | 0 |
| Colorado State | 0 | – | 8 | – | 0 | 0 | – | 12 | – | 0 |
$ – Conference champion; Rankings from AP Poll

1982 Western Athletic Conference football standings
| | Conf. | | | | | Overall |
| Team | W | | L | | T | W | | L | | T |
|---|---|---|---|---|---|---|---|---|---|---|
| BYU $ | 7 | – | 1 | – | 0 | 8 | – | 4 | – | 0 |
| New Mexico | 6 | – | 1 | – | 0 | 10 | – | 1 | – | 0 |
| Air Force | 4 | – | 3 | – | 0 | 8 | – | 5 | – | 0 |
| San Diego State | 4 | – | 3 | – | 0 | 7 | – | 5 | – | 0 |
| Hawaii | 4 | – | 4 | – | 0 | 6 | – | 5 | – | 0 |
| Colorado State | 3 | – | 5 | – | 0 | 4 | – | 7 | – | 0 |
| Utah | 2 | – | 4 | – | 0 | 5 | – | 6 | – | 0 |
| Wyoming | 2 | – | 6 | – | 0 | 5 | – | 7 | – | 0 |
| UTEP | 1 | – | 6 | – | 0 | 2 | – | 10 | – | 0 |
$ – Conference champion

1983 Western Athletic Conference football standings
| | Conf. | | | | | Overall |
| Team | W | | L | | T | W | | L | | T |
|---|---|---|---|---|---|---|---|---|---|---|
| No. 7 BYU $ | 7 | – | 0 | – | 0 | 11 | – | 1 | – | 0 |
| No. 13 Air Force | 5 | – | 2 | – | 0 | 10 | – | 2 | – | 0 |
| Wyoming | 5 | – | 3 | – | 0 | 7 | – | 5 | – | 0 |
| New Mexico | 4 | – | 3 | – | 0 | 6 | – | 6 | – | 0 |
| Hawaii | 3 | – | 3 | – | 1 | 5 | – | 5 | – | 1 |
| Utah | 4 | – | 4 | – | 0 | 5 | – | 6 | – | 0 |
| Colorado State | 4 | – | 4 | – | 0 | 5 | – | 7 | – | 0 |
| San Diego State | 1 | – | 6 | – | 1 | 2 | – | 9 | – | 1 |
| UTEP | 0 | – | 8 | – | 0 | 2 | – | 10 | – | 0 |
$ – Conference champion; Rankings from AP Poll

1984 Western Athletic Conference football standings
| | Conf. | | | | | Overall |
| Team | W | | L | | T | W | | L | | T |
|---|---|---|---|---|---|---|---|---|---|---|
| No. 1 BYU $ | 8 | – | 0 | – | 0 | 13 | – | 0 | – | 0 |
| Hawaii | 5 | – | 2 | – | 0 | 7 | – | 4 | – | 0 |
| Air Force | 4 | – | 3 | – | 0 | 8 | – | 4 | – | 0 |
| Utah | 4 | – | 3 | – | 1 | 6 | – | 5 | – | 1 |
| San Diego State | 4 | – | 3 | – | 1 | 4 | – | 7 | – | 1 |
| Wyoming | 4 | – | 4 | – | 0 | 6 | – | 6 | – | 0 |
| Colorado State | 3 | – | 5 | – | 0 | 3 | – | 8 | – | 0 |
| New Mexico | 1 | – | 7 | – | 0 | 4 | – | 8 | – | 0 |
| UTEP | 1 | – | 7 | – | 0 | 2 | – | 9 | – | 0 |
$ – Conference champion; Rankings from AP Poll

1985 Western Athletic Conference football standings
| | Conf. | | | | | Overall |
| Team | W | | L | | T | W | | L | | T |
|---|---|---|---|---|---|---|---|---|---|---|
| No. 8 Air Force + | 7 | – | 1 | – | 0 | 12 | – | 1 | – | 0 |
| No. 16 BYU + | 7 | – | 1 | – | 0 | 11 | – | 3 | – | 0 |
| Utah | 5 | – | 3 | – | 0 | 8 | – | 4 | – | 0 |
| Hawaii | 4 | – | 3 | – | 1 | 4 | – | 6 | – | 2 |
| Colorado State | 4 | – | 4 | – | 0 | 5 | – | 7 | – | 0 |
| San Diego State | 3 | – | 4 | – | 1 | 5 | – | 6 | – | 1 |
| New Mexico | 2 | – | 6 | – | 0 | 3 | – | 8 | – | 0 |
| Wyoming | 2 | – | 6 | – | 0 | 3 | – | 8 | – | 0 |
| UTEP | 1 | – | 7 | – | 0 | 1 | – | 10 | – | 0 |
+ – Conference co-champions; Rankings from AP Poll

1986 Western Athletic Conference football standings
| | Conf. | | | | | Overall |
| Team | W | | L | | T | W | | L | | T |
|---|---|---|---|---|---|---|---|---|---|---|
| San Diego State $ | 7 | – | 1 | – | 0 | 8 | – | 4 | – | 0 |
| BYU | 6 | – | 2 | – | 0 | 8 | – | 5 | – | 0 |
| Air Force | 5 | – | 2 | – | 0 | 6 | – | 5 | – | 0 |
| Hawaii | 4 | – | 4 | – | 0 | 7 | – | 5 | – | 0 |
| Colorado State | 4 | – | 4 | – | 0 | 6 | – | 5 | – | 0 |
| Wyoming | 4 | – | 4 | – | 0 | 6 | – | 6 | – | 0 |
| New Mexico | 2 | – | 5 | – | 0 | 4 | – | 8 | – | 0 |
| UTEP | 2 | – | 6 | – | 0 | 4 | – | 8 | – | 0 |
| Utah | 1 | – | 7 | – | 0 | 2 | – | 9 | – | 0 |
$ – Conference champion

1987 Western Athletic Conference football standings
| | Conf. | | | | | Overall |
| Team | W | | L | | T | W | | L | | T |
|---|---|---|---|---|---|---|---|---|---|---|
| Wyoming $ | 8 | – | 0 | – | 0 | 10 | – | 3 | – | 0 |
| BYU | 7 | – | 1 | – | 0 | 9 | – | 4 | – | 0 |
| Air Force | 6 | – | 2 | – | 0 | 9 | – | 4 | – | 0 |
| UTEP | 5 | – | 3 | – | 0 | 7 | – | 4 | – | 0 |
| San Diego State | 4 | – | 4 | – | 0 | 5 | – | 7 | – | 0 |
| Hawaii | 3 | – | 5 | – | 0 | 5 | – | 7 | – | 0 |
| Utah | 2 | – | 6 | – | 0 | 5 | – | 7 | – | 0 |
| Colorado State | 1 | – | 7 | – | 0 | 1 | – | 11 | – | 0 |
| New Mexico | 0 | – | 8 | – | 0 | 0 | – | 11 | – | 0 |
$ – Conference champion

1988 Western Athletic Conference football standings
| | Conf. | | | | | Overall |
| Team | W | | L | | T | W | | L | | T |
|---|---|---|---|---|---|---|---|---|---|---|
| Wyoming $ | 8 | – | 0 | – | 0 | 11 | – | 2 | – | 0 |
| UTEP | 6 | – | 2 | – | 0 | 10 | – | 3 | – | 0 |
| Hawaii | 5 | – | 3 | – | 0 | 9 | – | 3 | – | 0 |
| BYU | 5 | – | 3 | – | 0 | 9 | – | 4 | – | 0 |
| Utah | 4 | – | 4 | – | 0 | 6 | – | 5 | – | 0 |
| Air Force | 3 | – | 5 | – | 0 | 5 | – | 7 | – | 0 |
| San Diego State | 3 | – | 5 | – | 0 | 3 | – | 8 | – | 0 |
| New Mexico | 1 | – | 7 | – | 0 | 2 | – | 10 | – | 0 |
| Colorado State | 1 | – | 7 | – | 0 | 1 | – | 10 | – | 0 |
$ – Conference champion

1989 Western Athletic Conference football standings
| | Conf. | | | | | Overall |
| Team | W | | L | | T | W | | L | | T |
|---|---|---|---|---|---|---|---|---|---|---|
| No. 22 BYU $ | 7 | – | 1 | – | 0 | 10 | – | 3 | – | 0 |
| Air Force | 5 | – | 1 | – | 1 | 8 | – | 4 | – | 1 |
| Hawaii | 5 | – | 2 | – | 1 | 9 | – | 3 | – | 1 |
| Wyoming | 5 | – | 3 | – | 0 | 5 | – | 6 | – | 0 |
| San Diego State | 4 | – | 3 | – | 0 | 6 | – | 5 | – | 1 |
| Colorado State | 4 | – | 3 | – | 0 | 5 | – | 5 | – | 1 |
| Utah | 2 | – | 6 | – | 0 | 4 | – | 8 | – | 0 |
| UTEP | 1 | – | 7 | – | 0 | 2 | – | 10 | – | 0 |
| New Mexico | 0 | – | 7 | – | 0 | 2 | – | 10 | – | 0 |
$ – Conference champion; Rankings from AP Poll

1990 Western Athletic Conference football standings
| | Conf. | | | | | Overall |
| Team | W | | L | | T | W | | L | | T |
|---|---|---|---|---|---|---|---|---|---|---|
| No. 22 BYU $ | 7 | – | 1 | – | 0 | 10 | – | 3 | – | 0 |
| Colorado State | 6 | – | 1 | – | 0 | 9 | – | 4 | – | 0 |
| San Diego State | 5 | – | 2 | – | 0 | 6 | – | 5 | – | 0 |
| Wyoming | 5 | – | 3 | – | 0 | 9 | – | 4 | – | 0 |
| Hawaii | 4 | – | 4 | – | 0 | 7 | – | 5 | – | 0 |
| Air Force | 3 | – | 4 | – | 0 | 7 | – | 5 | – | 0 |
| Utah | 2 | – | 6 | – | 0 | 4 | – | 7 | – | 0 |
| New Mexico | 1 | – | 6 | – | 0 | 2 | – | 10 | – | 0 |
| UTEP | 1 | – | 7 | – | 0 | 3 | – | 8 | – | 0 |
$ – Conference champion; Rankings from AP Poll

1991 Western Athletic Conference football standings
| | Conf. | | | | | Overall |
| Team | W | | L | | T | W | | L | | T |
|---|---|---|---|---|---|---|---|---|---|---|
| No. 23 BYU $ | 7 | – | 0 | – | 1 | 8 | – | 3 | – | 2 |
| San Diego State | 6 | – | 1 | – | 1 | 8 | – | 4 | – | 1 |
| No. 25 Air Force | 6 | – | 2 | – | 0 | 10 | – | 3 | – | 0 |
| Utah | 4 | – | 4 | – | 0 | 7 | – | 5 | – | 0 |
| Hawaii | 3 | – | 5 | – | 0 | 4 | – | 7 | – | 1 |
| Wyoming | 2 | – | 5 | – | 1 | 4 | – | 6 | – | 1 |
| UTEP | 2 | – | 5 | – | 1 | 4 | – | 7 | – | 1 |
| Colorado State | 2 | – | 6 | – | 0 | 3 | – | 8 | – | 0 |
| New Mexico | 2 | – | 6 | – | 0 | 2 | – | 9 | – | 0 |
$ – Conference champion; Rankings from AP Poll

1992 Western Athletic Conference football standings
| | Conf. | | | | | Overall |
| Team | W | | L | | T | W | | L | | T |
|---|---|---|---|---|---|---|---|---|---|---|
| No. 20 Hawaii + | 6 | – | 2 | – | 0 | 11 | – | 2 | – | 0 |
| No. 24 Fresno State + | 6 | – | 2 | – | 0 | 9 | – | 4 | – | 0 |
| BYU + | 6 | – | 2 | – | 0 | 8 | – | 5 | – | 0 |
| San Diego State | 5 | – | 3 | – | 0 | 5 | – | 5 | – | 1 |
| Air Force | 4 | – | 4 | – | 0 | 7 | – | 5 | – | 0 |
| Utah | 4 | – | 4 | – | 0 | 6 | – | 6 | – | 0 |
| Colorado State | 3 | – | 5 | – | 0 | 5 | – | 7 | – | 0 |
| Wyoming | 3 | – | 5 | – | 0 | 5 | – | 7 | – | 0 |
| New Mexico | 2 | – | 6 | – | 0 | 3 | – | 8 | – | 0 |
| UTEP | 1 | – | 7 | – | 0 | 1 | – | 10 | – | 0 |
+ – Conference co-champions; Rankings from AP Poll

1993 Western Athletic Conference football standings
| | Conf. | | | | | Overall |
| Team | W | | L | | T | W | | L | | T |
|---|---|---|---|---|---|---|---|---|---|---|
| Fresno State + | 6 | – | 2 | – | 0 | 8 | – | 4 | – | 0 |
| Wyoming + | 6 | – | 2 | – | 0 | 8 | – | 4 | – | 0 |
| BYU + | 6 | – | 2 | – | 0 | 6 | – | 6 | – | 0 |
| Utah | 5 | – | 3 | – | 0 | 7 | – | 6 | – | 0 |
| Colorado State | 5 | – | 3 | – | 0 | 5 | – | 6 | – | 0 |
| New Mexico | 4 | – | 4 | – | 0 | 6 | – | 5 | – | 0 |
| San Diego State | 4 | – | 4 | – | 0 | 6 | – | 6 | – | 0 |
| Hawaii | 3 | – | 5 | – | 0 | 6 | – | 6 | – | 0 |
| Air Force | 1 | – | 7 | – | 0 | 4 | – | 8 | – | 0 |
| UTEP | 0 | – | 8 | – | 0 | 1 | – | 11 | – | 0 |
+ – Conference co-champions

1994 Western Athletic Conference football standings
| | Conf. | | | | | Overall |
| Team | W | | L | | T | W | | L | | T |
|---|---|---|---|---|---|---|---|---|---|---|
| No. 16 Colorado State $ | 7 | – | 1 | – | 0 | 10 | – | 2 | – | 0 |
| No. 10 Utah | 6 | – | 2 | – | 0 | 10 | – | 2 | – | 0 |
| No. 18 BYU | 6 | – | 2 | – | 0 | 10 | – | 3 | – | 0 |
| Air Force | 6 | – | 2 | – | 0 | 8 | – | 4 | – | 0 |
| Wyoming | 4 | – | 4 | – | 0 | 6 | – | 6 | – | 0 |
| New Mexico | 4 | – | 4 | – | 0 | 5 | – | 7 | – | 0 |
| Fresno State | 3 | – | 4 | – | 1 | 5 | – | 7 | – | 1 |
| San Diego State | 2 | – | 6 | – | 0 | 4 | – | 7 | – | 0 |
| UTEP | 1 | – | 6 | – | 1 | 3 | – | 7 | – | 1 |
| Hawaii | 0 | – | 8 | – | 0 | 3 | – | 8 | – | 1 |
$ – Conference champion; Rankings from AP Poll

1995 Western Athletic Conference football standings
| | Conf. | | | Overall |
| Team | W | | L | W | | L |
|---|---|---|---|---|---|---|
| Colorado State + | 6 | – | 2 | 8 | – | 4 |
| BYU + | 6 | – | 2 | 7 | – | 4 |
| Utah + | 6 | – | 2 | 7 | – | 4 |
| Air Force + | 6 | – | 2 | 8 | – | 5 |
| San Diego State | 5 | – | 3 | 8 | – | 4 |
| Wyoming | 4 | – | 4 | 6 | – | 5 |
| Fresno State | 2 | – | 6 | 5 | – | 7 |
| New Mexico | 2 | – | 6 | 4 | – | 7 |
| Hawaii | 2 | – | 6 | 4 | – | 8 |
| UTEP | 1 | – | 7 | 2 | – | 10 |
+ – Conference co-champions

1996 Western Athletic Conference football standings
| | Conf. | | | Overall |
| Team | W | | L | W | | L |
|---|---|---|---|---|---|---|
Mountain Division
| No. 5 BYU x$ | 8 | – | 0 | 14 | – | 1 |
| Utah | 6 | – | 2 | 8 | – | 4 |
| Rice | 6 | – | 2 | 7 | – | 4 |
| SMU | 4 | – | 4 | 5 | – | 6 |
| New Mexico | 3 | – | 5 | 6 | – | 5 |
| TCU | 3 | – | 5 | 4 | – | 7 |
| Tulsa | 2 | – | 6 | 4 | – | 7 |
| UTEP | 0 | – | 8 | 2 | – | 9 |
Pacific Division
| No. 22 Wyoming x | 7 | – | 1 | 10 | – | 2 |
| San Diego State | 6 | – | 2 | 8 | – | 3 |
| Colorado State | 6 | – | 2 | 7 | – | 5 |
| Air Force | 5 | – | 3 | 6 | – | 5 |
| Fresno State | 3 | – | 5 | 4 | – | 7 |
| San Jose State | 3 | – | 5 | 3 | – | 9 |
| Hawaii | 1 | – | 7 | 2 | – | 10 |
| UNLV | 1 | – | 8 | 1 | – | 11 |
Championship: BYU 28, Wyoming 25 ^{OT}
$ – Conference champion; x – Division champion/co-champions; Rankings from AP Poll

1997 Western Athletic Conference football standings
| | Conf. | | | Overall |
| Team | W | | L | W | | L |
|---|---|---|---|---|---|---|
Mountain Division
| New Mexico x | 6 | – | 2 | 9 | – | 4 |
| Rice | 5 | – | 3 | 7 | – | 4 |
| SMU | 5 | – | 3 | 6 | – | 5 |
| Utah | 5 | – | 3 | 6 | – | 5 |
| BYU | 4 | – | 4 | 6 | – | 5 |
| UTEP | 3 | – | 5 | 4 | – | 7 |
| Tulsa | 2 | – | 6 | 2 | – | 9 |
| TCU | 1 | – | 7 | 1 | – | 10 |
Pacific Division
| No. 17 Colorado State x$ | 7 | – | 1 | 11 | – | 2 |
| Air Force | 6 | – | 2 | 10 | – | 3 |
| Fresno State | 5 | – | 3 | 6 | – | 6 |
| Wyoming | 4 | – | 4 | 7 | – | 6 |
| San Diego State | 4 | – | 4 | 5 | – | 7 |
| San Jose State | 4 | – | 4 | 4 | – | 7 |
| UNLV | 2 | – | 6 | 3 | – | 8 |
| Hawaii | 1 | – | 7 | 3 | – | 9 |
Championship: Colorado State 41, New Mexico 13
$ – Conference champion; x – Division champion/co-champions; Rankings from AP Poll

1998 Western Athletic Conference football standings
| | Conf. | | | Overall |
| Team | W | | L | W | | L |
|---|---|---|---|---|---|---|
Mountain Division
| No. 13 Air Force x$ | 7 | – | 1 | 12 | – | 1 |
| Wyoming | 6 | – | 2 | 8 | – | 3 |
| Colorado State | 5 | – | 3 | 8 | – | 4 |
| Rice | 5 | – | 3 | 5 | – | 6 |
| TCU | 4 | – | 4 | 7 | – | 5 |
| Tulsa | 2 | – | 6 | 4 | – | 7 |
| SMU | 1 | – | 1 | 0 | – | 1 |
| UNLV | 0 | – | 8 | 0 | – | 11 |
Pacific Division
| BYU xy | 7 | – | 1 | 9 | – | 5 |
| San Diego State x | 7 | – | 1 | 7 | – | 5 |
| Utah | 5 | – | 3 | 7 | – | 4 |
| Fresno State | 5 | – | 3 | 5 | – | 6 |
| San Jose State | 3 | – | 5 | 4 | – | 8 |
| UTEP | 3 | – | 5 | 3 | – | 8 |
| New Mexico | 1 | – | 7 | 3 | – | 9 |
| Hawaii | 0 | – | 8 | 0 | – | 12 |
Championship: Air Force 20, BYU 13
$ – Conference champion; x – Division champion/co-champions; y – Championship game participant; Rankings from AP Poll

1999 Western Athletic Conference football standings
| | Conf. | | | Overall |
| Team | W | | L | W | | L |
|---|---|---|---|---|---|---|
| Hawaii + | 5 | – | 2 | 9 | – | 4 |
| TCU + | 5 | – | 2 | 8 | – | 4 |
| Fresno State + | 5 | – | 2 | 8 | – | 5 |
| Rice | 4 | – | 3 | 5 | – | 6 |
| SMU | 3 | – | 3 | 4 | – | 6 |
| UTEP | 3 | – | 4 | 5 | – | 7 |
| San Jose State | 1 | – | 5 | 3 | – | 7 |
| Tulsa | 1 | – | 6 | 2 | – | 9 |
+ – Conference co-champions

2000 Western Athletic Conference football standings
| | Conf. | | | Overall |
| Team | W | | L | W | | L |
|---|---|---|---|---|---|---|
| No. 21 TCU + | 7 | – | 1 | 10 | – | 2 |
| UTEP + | 7 | – | 1 | 8 | – | 4 |
| Fresno State | 6 | – | 2 | 7 | – | 5 |
| San Jose State | 5 | – | 3 | 7 | – | 5 |
| Tulsa | 4 | – | 4 | 5 | – | 7 |
| Rice | 2 | – | 6 | 3 | – | 8 |
| Hawaii | 2 | – | 6 | 3 | – | 9 |
| SMU | 2 | – | 6 | 3 | – | 9 |
| Nevada | 1 | – | 7 | 2 | – | 10 |
+ – Conference co-champions; Rankings from AP Poll

2001 Western Athletic Conference football standings
| | Conf. | | | Overall |
| Team | W | | L | W | | L |
|---|---|---|---|---|---|---|
| Louisiana Tech $ | 7 | – | 1 | 7 | – | 5 |
| Fresno State | 6 | – | 2 | 11 | – | 3 |
| Boise State | 6 | – | 2 | 8 | – | 4 |
| Hawaii | 5 | – | 3 | 9 | – | 3 |
| Rice | 5 | – | 3 | 8 | – | 4 |
| SMU | 4 | – | 4 | 4 | – | 7 |
| Nevada | 3 | – | 5 | 3 | – | 8 |
| San Jose State | 3 | – | 5 | 3 | – | 9 |
| UTEP | 1 | – | 7 | 2 | – | 9 |
| Tulsa | 0 | – | 8 | 1 | – | 10 |
$ – Conference champion

2002 Western Athletic Conference football standings
| | Conf. | | | Overall |
| Team | W | | L | W | | L |
|---|---|---|---|---|---|---|
| No. 15 Boise State $ | 8 | – | 0 | 12 | – | 1 |
| Hawaii | 7 | – | 1 | 10 | – | 4 |
| Fresno State | 6 | – | 2 | 9 | – | 5 |
| San Jose State | 4 | – | 4 | 6 | – | 7 |
| Nevada | 4 | – | 4 | 5 | – | 7 |
| Rice | 3 | – | 5 | 4 | – | 7 |
| Louisiana Tech | 3 | – | 5 | 4 | – | 8 |
| SMU | 3 | – | 5 | 3 | – | 9 |
| UTEP | 1 | – | 7 | 2 | – | 10 |
| Tulsa | 1 | – | 7 | 1 | – | 11 |
$ – Conference champion; Rankings from AP Poll

2003 Western Athletic Conference football standings
| | Conf. | | | Overall |
| Team | W | | L | W | | L |
|---|---|---|---|---|---|---|
| No. 16 Boise State $ | 8 | – | 0 | 13 | – | 1 |
| Fresno State | 6 | – | 2 | 9 | – | 5 |
| Tulsa | 6 | – | 2 | 8 | – | 5 |
| Hawaii | 5 | – | 3 | 9 | – | 5 |
| Rice | 5 | – | 3 | 5 | – | 7 |
| Nevada | 4 | – | 4 | 6 | – | 6 |
| Louisiana Tech | 3 | – | 5 | 5 | – | 7 |
| San Jose State | 2 | – | 6 | 3 | – | 8 |
| UTEP | 1 | – | 6 | 2 | – | 10 |
| SMU | 0 | – | 8 | 0 | – | 12 |
$ – Conference champion; Rankings from AP Poll

2004 Western Athletic Conference football standings
| | Conf. | | | Overall |
| Team | W | | L | W | | L |
|---|---|---|---|---|---|---|
| No. 12 Boise State $ | 8 | – | 0 | 11 | – | 1 |
| UTEP | 6 | – | 2 | 8 | – | 4 |
| No. 22 Fresno State | 5 | – | 3 | 9 | – | 3 |
| Louisiana Tech | 5 | – | 3 | 6 | – | 6 |
| Hawaii | 4 | – | 4 | 8 | – | 5 |
| Nevada | 3 | – | 5 | 5 | – | 7 |
| Tulsa | 3 | – | 5 | 4 | – | 8 |
| SMU | 3 | – | 5 | 3 | – | 8 |
| Rice | 2 | – | 6 | 3 | – | 8 |
| San Jose State | 1 | – | 7 | 2 | – | 9 |
$ – Conference champion; Rankings from AP Poll

2005 Western Athletic Conference football standings
| | Conf. | | | Overall |
| Team | W | | L | W | | L |
|---|---|---|---|---|---|---|
| Boise State + | 7 | – | 1 | 9 | – | 4 |
| Nevada + | 7 | – | 1 | 9 | – | 3 |
| Louisiana Tech | 6 | – | 2 | 7 | – | 4 |
| Fresno State | 6 | – | 2 | 8 | – | 5 |
| Hawaii | 4 | – | 4 | 5 | – | 7 |
| San Jose State | 2 | – | 6 | 3 | – | 8 |
| Utah State | 2 | – | 6 | 3 | – | 8 |
| Idaho | 2 | – | 6 | 2 | – | 9 |
| New Mexico State | 0 | – | 8 | 0 | – | 12 |
+ – Conference co-champions

2006 Western Athletic Conference football standings
| | Conf. | | | Overall |
| Team | W | | L | W | | L |
|---|---|---|---|---|---|---|
| No. 5 Boise State $ | 8 | – | 0 | 13 | – | 0 |
| Hawaii | 7 | – | 1 | 11 | – | 3 |
| San Jose State | 5 | – | 3 | 9 | – | 4 |
| Nevada | 5 | – | 3 | 8 | – | 5 |
| Fresno State | 4 | – | 4 | 4 | – | 8 |
| Idaho | 3 | – | 5 | 4 | – | 8 |
| New Mexico State | 2 | – | 6 | 4 | – | 8 |
| Louisiana Tech | 1 | – | 7 | 3 | – | 10 |
| Utah State | 1 | – | 7 | 1 | – | 11 |
$ – Conference champion and BCS representative as top non-AQ school to meet automatic qualification criteria; Rankings from AP Poll

2007 Western Athletic Conference football standings
| | Conf. | | | Overall |
| Team | W | | L | W | | L |
|---|---|---|---|---|---|---|
| No. 19 Hawaii $ | 8 | – | 0 | 12 | – | 1 |
| Boise State | 7 | – | 1 | 10 | – | 3 |
| Fresno State | 6 | – | 2 | 9 | – | 4 |
| Nevada | 4 | – | 4 | 6 | – | 7 |
| Louisiana Tech | 4 | – | 4 | 5 | – | 7 |
| San Jose State | 4 | – | 4 | 5 | – | 7 |
| Utah State | 2 | – | 6 | 2 | – | 10 |
| New Mexico State | 1 | – | 7 | 4 | – | 9 |
| Idaho | 0 | – | 8 | 1 | – | 11 |
$ – Conference champion and BCS representative as top non-AQ school to meet automatic qualification criteria; Rankings from AP Poll

2008 Western Athletic Conference football standings
| | Conf. | | | Overall |
| Team | W | | L | W | | L |
|---|---|---|---|---|---|---|
| No. 11 Boise State $ | 8 | – | 0 | 12 | – | 1 |
| Louisiana Tech | 5 | – | 3 | 8 | – | 5 |
| Nevada | 5 | – | 3 | 7 | – | 6 |
| Hawaii | 5 | – | 3 | 7 | – | 7 |
| Fresno State | 4 | – | 4 | 7 | – | 6 |
| San Jose State | 4 | – | 4 | 6 | – | 6 |
| Utah State | 3 | – | 5 | 3 | – | 9 |
| New Mexico State | 1 | – | 7 | 3 | – | 9 |
| Idaho | 1 | – | 7 | 2 | – | 10 |
$ – Conference champion; Rankings from AP Poll

2009 Western Athletic Conference football standings
| | Conf. | | | Overall |
| Team | W | | L | W | | L |
|---|---|---|---|---|---|---|
| No. 4 Boise State $% | 8 | – | 0 | 14 | – | 0 |
| Nevada | 7 | – | 1 | 8 | – | 5 |
| Fresno State | 6 | – | 2 | 8 | – | 5 |
| Idaho | 4 | – | 4 | 8 | – | 5 |
| Hawaii | 3 | – | 5 | 6 | – | 7 |
| Louisiana Tech | 3 | – | 5 | 4 | – | 8 |
| Utah State | 3 | – | 5 | 4 | – | 8 |
| New Mexico State | 1 | – | 7 | 3 | – | 10 |
| San Jose State | 1 | – | 7 | 2 | – | 10 |
% – BCS at-large representative; $ – Conference champion; Rankings from AP Poll

2010 Western Athletic Conference football standings
| | Conf. | | | Overall |
| Team | W | | L | W | | L |
|---|---|---|---|---|---|---|
| No. 11 Nevada + | 7 | – | 1 | 13 | – | 1 |
| No. 9 Boise State + | 7 | – | 1 | 12 | – | 1 |
| Hawaii + | 7 | – | 1 | 10 | – | 4 |
| Fresno State | 5 | – | 3 | 8 | – | 5 |
| Louisiana Tech | 4 | – | 4 | 5 | – | 7 |
| Idaho | 3 | – | 5 | 6 | – | 7 |
| Utah State | 2 | – | 6 | 4 | – | 8 |
| New Mexico State | 1 | – | 7 | 2 | – | 10 |
| San Jose State | 0 | – | 8 | 1 | – | 12 |
+ – Conference co-champions; Rankings from AP Poll

2011 Western Athletic Conference football standings
| | Conf. | | | Overall |
| Team | W | | L | W | | L |
|---|---|---|---|---|---|---|
| Louisiana Tech $ | 6 | – | 1 | 8 | – | 5 |
| Nevada | 5 | – | 2 | 7 | – | 6 |
| Utah State | 5 | – | 2 | 7 | – | 6 |
| Hawaii | 3 | – | 4 | 6 | – | 7 |
| San Jose State | 3 | – | 4 | 5 | – | 7 |
| Fresno State | 3 | – | 4 | 4 | – | 9 |
| New Mexico State | 2 | – | 5 | 4 | – | 9 |
| Idaho | 1 | – | 6 | 2 | – | 10 |
$ – Conference champion

2012 Western Athletic Conference football standings
| | Conf. | | | Overall |
| Team | W | | L | W | | L |
|---|---|---|---|---|---|---|
| No. 16 Utah State $ | 6 | – | 0 | 11 | – | 2 |
| No. 21 San Jose State | 5 | – | 1 | 11 | – | 2 |
| Louisiana Tech | 4 | – | 2 | 9 | – | 3 |
| UTSA * | 3 | – | 3 | 8 | – | 4 |
| Texas State * | 2 | – | 4 | 4 | – | 8 |
| Idaho | 1 | – | 5 | 1 | – | 11 |
| New Mexico State | 0 | – | 6 | 1 | – | 11 |
$ – Conference champion; * Texas State and UTSA were not eligible for conference title or bowl games as part of their transition to the FBS.; Rankings from AP Poll

2021 Western Athletic Conference football standings
| | Conf. | | | Overall |
| Team | W | | L | W | | L |
|---|---|---|---|---|---|---|
| No. 5 Sam Houston $^ | 5 | – | 0 | 11 | – | 1 |
| No. 21 Stephen F. Austin ^ | 4 | – | 1 | 8 | – | 4 |
| Abilene Christian | 2 | – | 2 | 5 | – | 6 |
| Tarleton State * | 2 | – | 3 | 6 | – | 5 |
| Dixie State * | 0 | – | 3 | 1 | – | 10 |
| Lamar | 0 | – | 4 | 1 | – | 9 |
$ – Conference champion; ^ – FCS playoff participant; * – Ineligible for FCS playoffs due to transition from Division II; Rankings from STATS Poll

2022 Western Athletic Conference football standings
| | Conf. | | | Overall |
| Team | W | | L | W | | L |
|---|---|---|---|---|---|---|
| Stephen F. Austin + | 3 | – | 1 | 6 | – | 5 |
| Abilene Christian + | 3 | – | 1 | 7 | – | 4 |
| Sam Houston * | 3 | – | 2 | 5 | – | 4 |
| Utah Tech * | 2 | – | 2 | 4 | – | 7 |
| Tarleton * | 1 | – | 3 | 6 | – | 5 |
| Southern Utah | 1 | – | 3 | 5 | – | 6 |
+ – Conference co-champions; * Note: Sam Houston ineligible for WAC championship and FCS postseason play due to start of transition to FBS; Tarleton and Utah Tech ineligible for FCS postseason play due to transition from NCAA Division II.; Rankings from STATS Poll
