= Andre Davis (running back) =

Profile
- Position: Running back

Personal information
- Born: c. 1974

Career information
- College: TCU (1992–1995)

Andre Davis (born c. 1974) is a former American football running back for the TCU Horned Frogs from 1992 to 1995. In 1994, he ranked fourth nationally with 1,494 rushing yards. He gained a career-high 325 rushing yards on September 10, 1994, against New Mexico. Over his college career, he tallied 3,182 rushing yards, 1,084 receiving yards, 598 yards on kickoff returns, 4,864 all-purpose yards, and 26 touchdowns.

In October 1995, Davis was declared ineligible to continue playing due to accepting monetary benefits from an agent.
