= 1978 San Diego State Aztecs football team =

American college football season

1978 San Diego State Aztecs football
- Conference: Western Athletic Conference
- Record: 4–7 (2–4 WAC)
- Head coach: Claude Gilbert (6th season)
- Offensive coordinator: Ted Tollner (6th season)
- Offensive scheme: Pro-style
- Base defense: 4–3
- Home stadium: San Diego Stadium

1978 Western Athletic Conference football standings
	Conf.					Overall
Team	W		L		T	W		L		T
BYU $	5	–	1	–	0	9	–	4	–	0
Utah	4	–	2	–	0	8	–	3	–	0
Wyoming	4	–	2	–	0	5	–	7	–	0
New Mexico	3	–	3	–	0	7	–	5	–	0
Colorado State	2	–	4	–	0	5	–	6	–	0
San Diego State	2	–	4	–	0	4	–	7	–	0
UTEP	1	–	5	–	0	1	–	11	–	0
$ – Conference champion

The 1978 San Diego State Aztecs football team represented San Diego State University during the 1978 NCAA Division I-A football season as a member of the Western Athletic Conference (WAC). This was the Aztecs' first season in the WAC.

The team was led by head coach Claude Gilbert, in his sixth year, and played home games at San Diego Stadium (Note: San Diego County Credit Union Stadium (SDCCU Stadium) was known as San Diego Stadium from its opening in 1967 through 1980.) in San Diego, California. They finished with a record of four wins and seven losses (4–7, 2–4 WAC).

== Schedule ==
Date	Opponent	Site	Result	Attendance	Source
September 16	at No. 19 Iowa State*	Cyclone Stadium; Ames, IA	L 13–14	46,450	
September 23	at UTEP	Sun Bowl; El Paso, TX	L 24–31	14,100	
October 7	Fresno State*	San Diego Stadium; San Diego, CA (rivalry)	W 31–14	42,424	
October 14	at Wyoming	War Memorial Stadium; Laramie, WY	L 22–31	21,471	
October 21	Pacific (CA)*	San Diego Stadium; San Diego, CA	W 31–28	37,219	
October 28	at Long Beach State*	Anaheim Stadium; Anaheim, CA	L 25–27	11,216	
November 4	Colorado State^{†}	San Diego Stadium; San Diego, CA	W 34–31	38,494	
November 11	at BYU	Cougar Stadium; Provo, UT	L 3–21	22,682	
November 18	at Miami (FL)*	Miami Orange Bowl; Miami, FL	L 14–16	17,468	
November 25	New Mexico	San Diego Stadium; San Diego, CA	W 27–24	30,011	
December 2	Utah	San Diego Stadium; San Diego, CA	L 18–20	30,899	
*Non-conference game; ^{†}Homecoming; Rankings from AP Poll released prior to the game

== Team players in the NFL ==
The following were selected in the 1979 NFL draft.

Player	Position	Round	Overall	NFL team
Don Warren	Tight end	4	103	Washington Redskins
Henry Williams	Defensive back	6	156	Oakland Raiders
Kent Perkov	Defensive end	8	204	Cleveland Browns

The following finished their college career in 1978, were not drafted, but played in the NFL.

Player	Position	First NFL team
Curtis Bledsoe	Running back	1981 Kansas City Chiefs
David Gray	Defensive back	1979 New Orleans Saints
Phil DuBois	Tight end	1979 Washington Redskins
Saladin Martin	Defensive back	1980 New York Jets

== Team awards ==
Award	Player
Most Valuable Player (John Simcox Memorial Trophy)	Phil Dubois
Outstanding Offensive & Defensive Linemen (Byron H. Chase Memorial Trophy)	Pete Inge, Off; Kent Perkov, Def
Team captains Dr. R. Hardy / C.E. Peterson Memorial Trophy	Don Warren, Off; Steve Jorde, Def Walk on Captain M Merino
Most Inspirational Player	Dave Katzenmeyer
