= 1978 Utah Utes football team =

American college football season

1978 Utah Utes football
- Conference: Western Athletic Conference
- Record: 8–3 (4–2 WAC)
- Head coach: Wayne Howard (2nd season)
- Offensive coordinator: Ron McBride (2nd season)
- Defensive coordinator: Tom Gadd (2nd season)
- Home stadium: Robert Rice Stadium

1978 Western Athletic Conference football standings
	Conf.					Overall
Team	W		L		T	W		L		T
BYU $	5	–	1	–	0	9	–	4	–	0
Utah	4	–	2	–	0	8	–	3	–	0
Wyoming	4	–	2	–	0	5	–	7	–	0
New Mexico	3	–	3	–	0	7	–	5	–	0
Colorado State	2	–	4	–	0	5	–	6	–	0
San Diego State	2	–	4	–	0	4	–	7	–	0
UTEP	1	–	5	–	0	1	–	11	–	0
$ – Conference champion

The 1978 Utah Utes football team was an American football team that represented the University of Utah as a member of the Western Athletic Conference (WAC) during the 1978 NCAA Division I-A football season. In their second season under head coach Wayne Howard, the Utes compiled an overall record of 8–3 with a mark of 4–2 against conference opponents, tying for second place in the WAC. Home games were played on campus at Robert Rice Stadium in Salt Lake City.

== Schedule ==
Date	Time	Opponent	Site	Result	Attendance	Source
September 9	7:30 pm	Idaho State*	Robert Rice Stadium; Salt Lake City, UT	W 56–0	25,822	
September 23	6:30 pm	at Houston*	Houston Astrodome; Houston, TX	L 25–42	30,004	
September 30	7:30 pm	Colorado State	Robert Rice Stadium; Salt Lake City, UT	W 30–6	27,821	
October 7	12:00 pm	at Iowa*	Kinnick Stadium; Iowa City, IA	W 13–9	51,170	
October 14	7:30 pm	Weber State*	Robert Rice Stadium; Salt Lake City, UT	W 30–7	23,458	
October 21	1:30 pm	at Wyoming	War Memorial Stadium; Laramie, WY	L 21–34	20,758	
November 4	1:30 pm	New Mexico^{†}	Robert Rice Stadium; Salt Lake City, UT	L 12–24	24,182	
November 11	7:30 pm	at UTEP	Sun Bowl; El Paso, TX	W 38–0	12,300	
November 18	1:30 pm	BYU	Robert Rice Stadium; Salt Lake City, UT (rivalry)	W 23–22	29,326	
November 25	1:30 pm	at Utah State*	Romney Stadium; Logan, UT (rivalry)	W 23–20	16,509	
December 2	7:00 pm	at San Diego State	San Diego Stadium; San Diego, CA	W 20–18	30,899	
*Non-conference game; ^{†}Homecoming; All times are in Mountain time

== Game summaries ==
=== BYU ===
BYU Cougars (7–2) at Utah Utes (5–3)

Quarter	1	2	3	4	Total
BYU	10	6	6	0	22
Utah	0	0	7	16	23

at Robert Rice Stadium, Salt Lake City, Utah

- Date: November 18, 1978
- Game weather: Sunny, 43 °F (6 °C)
- Game attendance: 29,326
- Box Score

Game information

First quarter

- BYU – Brent Johnson 20-yard field goal. BYU 3–0.
- BYU – Lloyd Jones 37-yard pass from Jim McMahon (Brent Johnson kick). BYU 10–0.

Second quarter

- BYU – Brent Johnson 52-yard field goal. BYU 13–0.
- BYU – Brent Johnson 21-yard field goal. BYU 16–0.

Third quarter

- UTAH – James Teahan 25-yard pass from Randy Gomez (Jeff Hucko kick). BYU 16–7.
- BYU – Dave Francis 20-yard interception return (kick failed). BYU 22–7.

Fourth quarter

- UTAH – Jeff Hucko 37-yard field goal. BYU 22–10.
- UTAH – Tony Lindsay 42-yard pass from Randy Gomez (Jeff Hucko kick). BYU 22-17.
- UTAH – Frank Henry 19-yard pass from Randy Gomez (pass failed), 2:15. Utah 23-22.

Top passers

- BYU – Jim McMahon – 15/38, 249 yards, TD
- UTAH – Randy Gomez – 20/31, 265 yards, 3 TD, 2 INT

Top rushers

- BYU – Lloyd Jones – 1 rush, 32 yards
- UTAH – Tony Lindsay – 30 rushes, 104 yards

Top receivers

- BYU – Lloyd Jones – 4 receptions, 67 yards
- UTAH – James Teahan – 5 receptions, 85 yards, TD

External videos
- Game highlights

== Personnel ==
1978 Utah Utes football team roster
Players
Coaches
Offense

Pos.	#	Name	Class
QB		Randy Gomez
		Frank Henry
		Tony Lindsay
FB		Mike Moseley
		James Teahan

Defense

Pos.	#	Name	Class
		Mike Bailey
		Jeff Griffin
		Jeff Lyall
		Guy Morrell
		Tony Reed
		Derek Washington
		James Wilson

Special teams

Pos.	#	Name	Class
K		Jeff Hucko

Head coach

- Wayne Howard

Coordinators/assistant coaches

Legend

- (C) Team captain
- (S) Suspended
- (I) Ineligible
- Injured
- Redshirt

== NFL draft ==
One Utah player was selected in the 1979 NFL draft.

Player	Position	Round	Pick	NFL team
Rick Partridge	Punter	8	208	Green Bay Packers
