= 1994 Holiday Bowl =

1994 Thrifty Car Rental Holiday Bowl
| Michigan Wolverines | Colorado State Rams |
| (7–4) | (10–1) |
| Big Ten | WAC |
| 24 | 14 |
| Head coach: Gary Moeller | Head coach: Sonny Lubick |
| AP / Coaches / BC; 20 / 18 / 20 | AP / Coaches / BC; 10 / 10 / 12 |
| | 1 | 2 | 3 | 4 | Total |
|---|---|---|---|---|---|
| Michigan | 10 | 7 | 7 | 0 | 24 |
| Colorado State | 7 | 0 | 0 | 7 | 14 |
- Date: December 30, 1994
- Season: 1994
- Stadium: Jack Murphy Stadium
- Location: San Diego, California
- MVP: Offensive: Todd Collins (Michigan); Defensive: Matt Dyson (Michigan)
- Referee: Bud Alexander (SWC)
- Halftime show: Marching bands
- Attendance: 59,453
- Payout: US$1,700,000 per team

United States TV coverage
- Network: ESPN
- Announcers: Brad Nessler and Gary Danielson

The 1994 Holiday Bowl was a college football bowl game played December 30, 1994, in San Diego, California. It was part of the 1994 NCAA Division I-A football season. It featured the tenth ranked Colorado State Rams, and the Michigan Wolverines. This game was notable because Michigan, had earlier lost to CSU's in-state rivals the Colorado Buffaloes on a hail mary pass, and was looking to defeat at least one Colorado school.

== Game summary ==
- Michigan – Toomer, four-yard pass from Collins (Hamilton kick)
- Colorado State – Turner, 32-yard pass from Hill (McDougal kick)
- Michigan – Hamilton, 34-yard field goal
- Michigan – Hayes, 16-yard pass from Collins Hamilton kick)
- Michigan – Wheatley, three-yard run (Hamilton kick)
- Colorado State – Burkett, 18-yard pass from Hill (McDougal kick)

In the first quarter, Michigan quarterback Todd Collins threw a 4-yard touchdown pass to wide receiver Amani Toomer, giving the Wolverines a 7–0 lead. Colorado State answered with a 32-yard touchdown pass from quarterback Anthoney Hill to wide receiver Paul Turner to tie the game at 7. All-American kicker Remy Hamilton kicked a 34-yard field goal on Michigan's next drive, as they took a 10–7 lead into the second quarter.

In the second quarter, Todd Collins threw a 16-yard touchdown pass to Mercury Hayes as Michigan took a 17–7 lead. That score would hold up until the third quarter. In the third quarter, running back Tyrone Wheatley scored on a 3-yard touchdown run giving Michigan a 24–7 lead. In the fourth quarter, Colorado State got an 18-yard touchdown pass from Anthoney Hill, as they closed the margin to 24–14.

== Statistics ==
| Statistics | Michigan | Colorado State |
|---|---|---|
| First downs | 18 | 20 |
| Rushing yards | 179 | 52 |
| Passing yards | 162 | 289 |
| Total yards | 342 | 340 |
| Passing | 14–24–3 | 22–40–2 |
| Fumbles–lost | 0–0 | 2–2 |
| Penalties–yards | 11–97 | 8–72 |
| Punts–average | 5–28.0 | 4–35.5 |
