= Matt Dyson =

American football player and coach (born 1972)

No. 59
- Position: Linebacker

Personal information
- Born: August 1, 1972 (age 54); La Plata, Maryland, U.S.
- Listed height: 6 ft 5 in (1.96 m)
- Listed weight: 265 lb (120 kg)

Career information
- High school: La Plata (MD)
- College: Michigan
- NFL draft: 1995: 5th round, 138th overall pick

Career history

Playing
- Oakland Raiders (1995)

Coaching
- George Mason (2006–2014) Head coach

Awards and highlights
- First-team All-Big Ten (1992); 1994 Holiday Bowl Defensive Player of the Game

Career NFL statistics
- Games played: 4
- Stats at Pro Football Reference

Matthew A. Dyson (born August 1, 1972) is an American football coach and a former player. He played college football as an outside linebacker for the University of Michigan from 1991 to 1994. He was selected as a first-team All-Big Ten linebacker as well as Honorable Mention All-American in 1992. He was the defensive player of the game in the 1994 Holiday Bowl. He was selected by the Oakland Raiders in the fifth round of the 1995 NFL draft and appeared in four games during the 1995 Oakland Raiders season.

== Early life ==
Dyson was born in La Plata, Maryland, in 1972. He attended La Plata High School. While attending La Plata High School, Dyson competed in football, basketball, soccer, and track and field. He was a running back and defensive end for the La Plata football team.

== University of Michigan ==
Dyson enrolled at the University of Michigan in 1990 and played college football as an outside linebacker for the Michigan Wolverines football teams from 1991 to 1994. After redshirting in 1990, Dyson started two games at outside linebacker in 1991, 10 games in 1992, nine games in 1993, and eight games in 1994.

As a redshirt sophomore, Dyson recorded 52 tackles and an interception for the undefeated 1992 Michigan Wolverines football team that compiled a 9–0–3 and defeated Washington in the 1993 Rose Bowl. At the end of the 1992 season, Dyson was selected as a first-team All-Big Ten linebacker. As a senior, he sustained a broken left foot in the 1994 season opener against Boston College, and missed the following three games before returning to action against Michigan State. In his final game for Michigan, Dyson was selected as the defensive player of the game in the Wolverines' 24-14 victory over Colorado State in the 1994 Holiday Bowl. In four seasons at Michigan, Dyson totaled 124 tackles, two pass breakups, one interception and one fumble recovery.

== Professional football ==
Dyson was selected by the Oakland Raiders in the fifth round (138th overall pick) of the 1995 NFL draft. He appeared in four games, none of them as a starter, for the Raiders during the 1995 season.

== Coaching career ==
After retiring from his playing career, Dyson worked as a coach. He was the defensive and offensive line coach and assistant defensive coordinator for the Falls Church High School football team in Falls Church, Virginia. He has also served as the head coach of the Falls Church track and field team. He was the head coach of the George Mason University football team for nine years.

== Personal life ==
Dyson lives in Gainesville, Virginia. He and his wife, Sara, have three daughters.
