= 1978 Holiday Bowl =

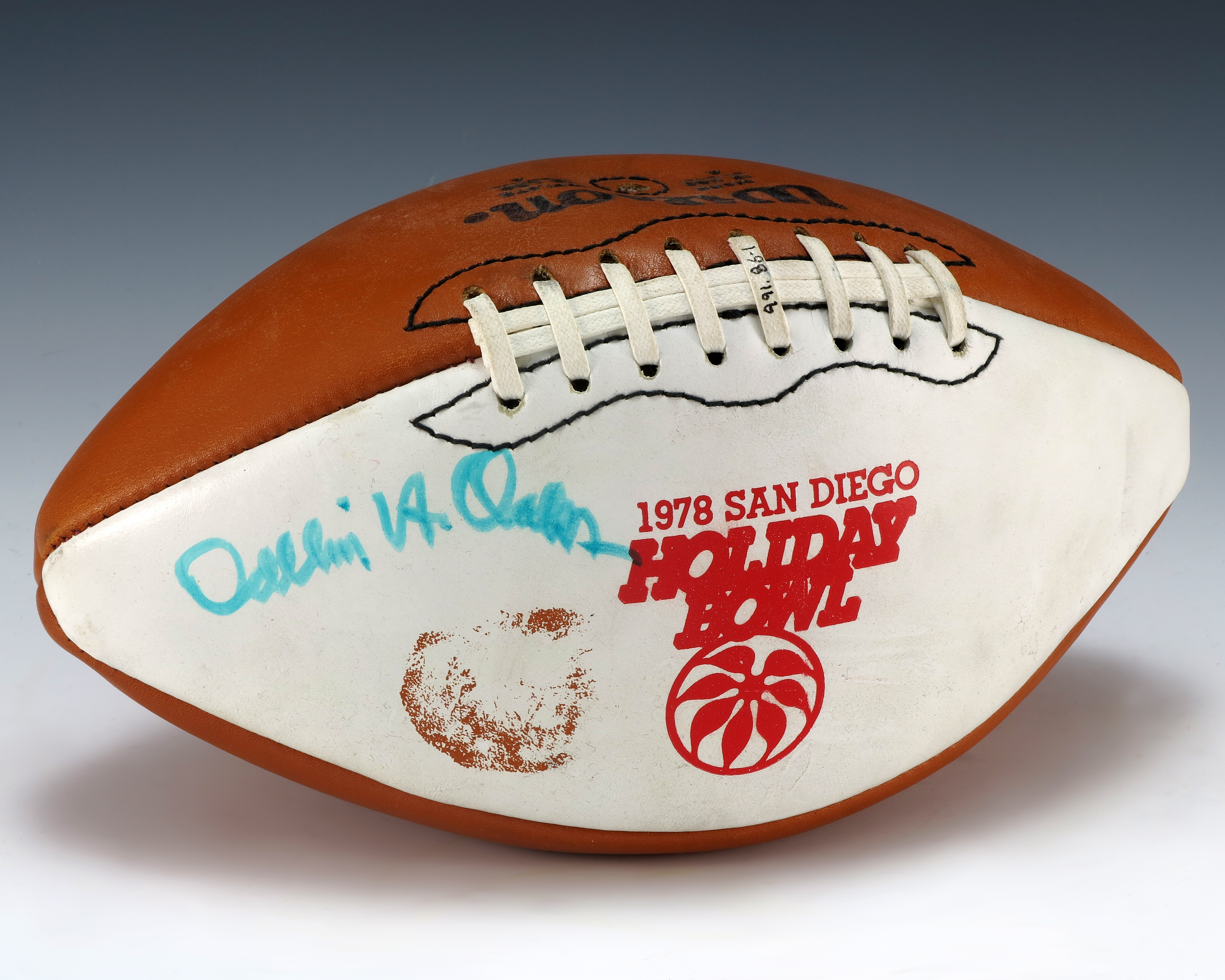
- A 1978 Holiday Bowl football, signed by BYU president Dallin H. Oaks.
Navy Midshipmen	BYU Cougars
(8–3)	(9–3)
Independent	WAC
23	16
Head coach: George Welsh	Head coach: LaVell Edwards
	1	2	3	4	Total
Navy	0	3	7	13	23
BYU	3	6	7	0	16
- Date: December 22, 1978
- Season: 1978
- Stadium: San Diego Stadium
- Location: San Diego, California
- MVP: WR Phil McConkey (Navy); Tom Enlow (BYU)
- Attendance: 52,500
- Payout: US$218,645 per team

The 1978 Holiday Bowl was the inaugural college football bowl game of the Holiday Bowl. It was played on December 22, 1978, at San Diego Stadium in San Diego, California. The game was part of the 1978 NCAA Division I-A football season. It featured the Navy Midshipmen against the BYU Cougars. Navy won 23–16.

== Background ==
Navy won their first seven games of the season, the most wins in a streak in years. A loss to Notre Dame sparked a losing streak that spanned to their games against Syracuse and Florida State, but the Midshipmen managed to rout Army 28–0 to win their eighth game, the most in a season since the nine win year in 1963. The Cougars had won their third straight Western Athletic Conference title (their fourth in five years), with a 5-1 conference record (their only loss being to Utah in the Holy War). BYU was making their 3rd bowl appearance in four years, after skipping the previous year (and their invite to the Fiesta Bowl) due to the game falling on a Sunday.

== Scoring summary ==
- BYU – Brent Johnson 33 yard field goal
- Navy – Bob Tata 40 yard field goal
- BYU – Mike Chronister 10 yard touchdown pass from Jim McMahon (kick fail)
- BYU – McMahon 2 yard touchdown run (Johnson kick)
- Navy – Kevin Tolbert 4 yard touchdown run (Tata kick)
- Navy – Tata 28 yard field goal
- Navy – Phil McConkey 65 yard touchdown pass from Bob Leszczynski (Tata kick)
- Navy – Tata 27 yard field goal

For Navy, Bob Lesczynski threw 7-of-13 for 123 yards for one touchdown. Phil McConkey caught 4 passes for 88 yards and rushed for 42 yards on 2 carries, while being named MVP. For BYU, Jim McMahon threw 9-of-18 for 133 yards for one touchdown and one interception. Mike Chronister caught 3 passes for 60 yards and one touchdown.

== Statistics ==
Statistics	Navy	BYU
First downs	20	16
Rushing yards	214	74
Passing yards	138	181
Total yards	352	255
Passing	8–14–0	16–34–2
Fumbles–lost	2–2	0–0
Penalties–yards	3–37	12–91
Punts–average	3–38.6	5–37.0
Kickoff return yards	70	80
Punt return yards	0	18
Time of possession	32:03	27:57

== Aftermath ==
This was the first in seven consecutive Holiday Bowl appearances for the Cougars, who won four of the seven they played, including one against Michigan in 1984 that determined the national championship. Navy has not reached the Holiday bowl since this game, while they went on a bowl win drought of 18 years, not winning one until 1996.
