= 1994 Freedom Bowl =

- Freedom Bowl XI
Utah Utes	Arizona Wildcats
(9–2)	(8–3)
16	13
Head coach: Ron McBride	Head coach: Dick Tomey
AP / Coaches / BC; 14 / 12 / 14	AP / Coaches / BC; 15 / 13 / 15
	1	2	3	4	Total
Utah	0	7	0	9	16
Arizona	7	0	0	6	13
- Date: December 27, 1994
- Season: 1994
- Stadium: Anaheim Stadium
- Location: Anaheim, California
- MVP: Cal Beck (Utah); Tedy Bruschi (Arizona)
- Referee: Tom Ahlers (Big 8)
- Attendance: 27,477

United States TV coverage
- Network: Raycom
- Announcers: Dave Barnett and Dave Rowe

The 1994 Freedom Bowl matched the Utah Utes and the Arizona Wildcats. This was the final Freedom Bowl game played.

== Background ==
Utah finished second in the WAC after two losses to New Mexico and Air Force cost them the WAC title and knocked them from #12 to #21. Arizona used their "Desert Swarm" defense to win their first four games and were ranked #6 before a loss to eventual WAC champ Colorado State. They went 4–2 from that point, with losses to Oregon and USC costing them the Pacific-10 Conference title and a shot at the Rose Bowl. Both teams were in their third straight bowl game.

== Game summary ==
Despite being held to less than 100 yards, Utah scored when it was needed most while Arizona dropped catches that could have gone for touchdowns and despite having the ball for 32:17 they mustered only one touchdown. Ontlwan Carter caught a touchdown pass from Dan White that culminated a 6-play, 77-yard drive late in the first quarter. Utah's defense responded, recovering a fumble at the Arizona 6. Two plays later, Charlie Brown ran in for the touchdown to make it 7–7 with 10:03 left in the second quarter. The rest of the second and the third quarter remained scoreless with both teams' defense in control. Steve McLaughlin broke the tie with a 44-yard field goal with 12:39 remaining, and a later interception gave Arizona a chance to seal the game at Utah's 20. After five plays and 18 yards, Arizona was close to scoring. But on first down, Tim Thomas dropped a pass intended for him by White. A rushing attempt on 2nd down failed. White threw a pass to a lonely Lovett in the end zone, but he dropped the pass. Arizona had to settle for a field goal by McLaughlin, who made it 13–7 with 8:05 left. After Utah failed to forward the ball into Arizona territory, the Wildcats were trapped in their own one yard line. After only gaining two yards on three plays, Arizona decided to give Utah an intentional safety rather than risk a bad punt, making it 13–9 with 4:11 left. On the ensuing free kick, Beck returned it 72 yards to the Wildcat 5. After three incompletions, Utah was facing fourth down and goal. Mike McCoy threw a desperation pass to Kevin Dyson, who caught it in the end zone to give Utah the lead with 3:34 remaining. Arizona had the ball at their 32 and needed a drive to go their way, but on their second play, Jeff Kaufusi forced a fumble out of White and Utah recovered at the 31. But with 1:47, Utah had to convert a 4th and one to run the clock out, and McCoy's pass to Rick Tucker gave them the first down and Utah ran off the rest of the clock to win their first bowl game since 1964.

== Aftermath ==
Utah finished in the AP Top 10, their highest AP finish in school history to that point; they have since topped that mark several times, with a peak rank of two reached in 2008.

Arizona missed out on the next two bowl seasons, returning in 1997 to win the Insight.com Bowl.

This edition of the Freedom Bowl was the final football game to be played at Anaheim Stadium. The Los Angeles Rams' relocation to St. Louis following the 1994 NFL season left the stadium without a football tenant, and after an abortive attempt by Seattle Seahawks owner Ken Behring to relocate his franchise to the stadium in 1995, construction began to return it to a baseball-only facility for the California Angels. The construction was completed in 1998.

== Statistics ==
Statistics	Utah	Arizona
First downs	5	14
Yards rushing	6	45
Yards passing	69	139
Total yards	75	184
Punts-Average	10-41.0	6-36.8
Fumbles-Lost	0-0	2-2
Interceptions	2	1
Penalties-Yards	9-94	4-35
