= 1978 BYU Cougars football team =

American college football season

1978 BYU Cougars football

WAC champion

Holiday Bowl, L 16–23 vs. Navy
- Conference: Western Athletic Conference
- Record: 9–4 (5–1 WAC)
- Head coach: LaVell Edwards (7th season)
- Offensive coordinator: Wally English (1st season)
- Offensive scheme: West Coast
- Defensive coordinator: Dick Felt (7th season)
- Base defense: 4–3
- Home stadium: Cougar Stadium

1978 Western Athletic Conference football standings
	Conf.					Overall
Team	W		L		T	W		L		T
BYU $	5	–	1	–	0	9	–	4	–	0
Utah	4	–	2	–	0	8	–	3	–	0
Wyoming	4	–	2	–	0	5	–	7	–	0
New Mexico	3	–	3	–	0	7	–	5	–	0
Colorado State	2	–	4	–	0	5	–	6	–	0
San Diego State	2	–	4	–	0	4	–	7	–	0
UTEP	1	–	5	–	0	1	–	11	–	0
$ – Conference champion

The 1978 BYU Cougars football team represented the Brigham Young University (BYU) in the 1978 NCAA Division I-A football season as a member of the Western Athletic Conference (WAC). The team was led by head coach LaVell Edwards, in his seventh year, and played their home games at Cougar Stadium in Provo, Utah. They finished the season with a record of nine wins and four losses (9–4, 5–1 WAC), as WAC champions and with a loss against Navy in the Holiday Bowl.

== Schedule ==
Date	Opponent	Site	Result	Attendance	Source
September 9	at Oregon State*	Parker Stadium; Corvallis, OR	W 10–6	19,651	
September 16	at Arizona State*	Sun Devil Stadium; Tempe, AZ	L 17–24	70,311	
September 23	Colorado State	Cougar Stadium; Provo, UT	W 32–6	31,052	
September 30	at New Mexico	University Stadium; Albuquerque, NM	W 27–23	24,892	
October 7	Utah State*	Cougar Stadium; Provo, UT (rivalry)	L 7–24	32,668	
October 14	at Oregon*	Autzen Stadium; Eugene, OR	W 17–16	24,500	
October 21	UTEP	Cougar Stadium; Provo, UT	W 44–0	23,335	
November 4	Wyoming	Cougar Stadium; Provo, UT	W 48–14	30,415	
November 11	San Diego State	Cougar Stadium; Provo, UT	W 21–3	22,682	
November 18	at Utah	Robert Rice Stadium; Salt Lake City, UT (Holy War)	L 22–23	29,326	
November 25	at Hawaii*	Aloha Stadium; Honolulu, HI	W 31–13	35,678	
December 1	vs. UNLV*	Yokohama Stadium; Yokohama, Japan (Yokohama Bowl)	W 28–24	27,500	
December 22	vs. Navy*	San Diego Stadium; San Diego, CA (Holiday Bowl)	L 16–23	52,500	
*Non-conference game

== Game summaries ==
=== At Oregon State ===
Brigham Young at Oregon State

Team	1	2	3	4	Total
• Cougars	7	3	0	0	10
Beavers	0	0	6	0	6

- Date: Saturday, September 9
- Location: Parker Stadium, Corvallis, Oregon
- Game attendance: 19,651
- Source: Eugene Register-Guard

Scoring summary
1	3:57	BYU	Thompson 10-yard pass from Wilson (Kittell kick)	BYU 7-0
2	13:35	BYU	Kittell 34-yard field goal	BYU 10-0
3	2:09	ORST	Coury 46-yard pass from White (kick failed)	BYU 10-6

=== Colorado State ===
Colorado State at BYU

Team	1	2	3	4	Total
Rams	0	0	6	0	6
• Cougars	7	6	19	0	32

- Date: September 23
- Location: Cougar Stadium, Provo, Utah
- Game start: 10:50 a.m. MST
- Game attendance: 31,052
- Game weather: Clear, 70 °F (21 °C)
- Television network: ABC (regional)

Scoring summary
1	2:07	BYU	Ring 1-yard run (Johnson kick)	BYU 7-0
2		BYU	Phillips 5-yard run (kick failed)	BYU 13-0
3		BYU	Wingard 1-yard run (run failed)	BYU 20-0
3		BYU	Jones 39-yard pass from McMahon (pass failed)	BYU 26-0
3		CSU	Newberry 10-yard pass from Lee (pass failed)	BYU 26-6
3		BYU	McMahon-yard run (Johnson kick)	BYU 32-6

Jim McMahon, the backup quarterback and normally handles the punting duties, came off the bench to pass for one score and run for another when Marc Wilson was injured early in the second quarter with a bruised hamstring. "It's nice to have quarterbacks like those two, isn't it", head coach LaVell Edwards said after the game.

=== At Oregon ===
BYU at Oregon

Team	1	2	3	4	Total
• Cougars	0	3	0	14	17
Ducks	10	0	6	0	16

- Date: Saturday, October 14
- Location: Autzen Stadium, Eugene, Oregon
- Game attendance: 24,500

Scoring summary
1	9:55	ORE	English 34-yard field goal	ORE 3-0
1	8:15	ORE	Lawler 3-yard blocked punt return (English kick)	ORE 10-0
2	6:42	BYU	Johnson 42-yard field goal	ORE 10-3
3	11:00	ORE	Durando 13-yard pass from Johnson (kick failed)	ORE 16-3
4	6:21	BYU	Thompson 21-yard pass from McMahon (Johnson kick)	ORE 16-10
4	3:03	BYU	Williams 1-yard run (Johnson kick)	BYU 17-16

=== Wyoming ===
Wyoming at BYU

Team	1	2	3	4	Total
Cowboys	7	7	0	0	14
• Cougars	10	10	7	21	48

- Date: November 4
- Location: Cougar Stadium, Provo, Utah
- Game attendance: 30,415

Scoring summary
1	BYU	McMahon 13-yard run (Johnson kick)	BYU 7-0
1	WYO	Jones 1-yard run (Christopulos kick)	Tied 7-7
1	BYU	Johnson 44-yard field goal	BYU 10-7
2	WYO	Jones 20-yard run (Christopulos kick)	WYO 14-10
2	BYU	Ring 2-yard run (Johnson kick)	BYU 17-14
2	BYU	Johnson 38-yard field goal	BYU 20-14
3	BYU	Thompson 7-yard pass from McMahon (Johnson kick)	BYU 27-14
4	BYU	McMahon 1-yard run (Johnson kick)	BYU 34-14
4	BYU	Thompson 16-yard pass from Wilson (Johnson kick)	BYU 41-14
4	BYU	Wilson 13-yard run (Johnson kick)	BYU 48-14

=== At Utah ===
BYU Cougars (7–2) at Utah Utes (5–3)

Quarter	1	2	3	4	Total
Cougars	10	6	6	0	22
Utes	0	0	7	16	23

at Robert Rice Stadium, Salt Lake City, Utah

- Date: November 18, 1978
- Game weather: Sunny, 43 °F (6 °C)
- Game attendance: 29,326
- Box Score

Game information

First quarter

- BYU – Brent Johnson 20-yard field goal. BYU 3–0.
- BYU – Lloyd Jones 37-yard pass from Jim McMahon (Brent Johnson kick). BYU 10–0.

Second quarter

- BYU – Brent Johnson 52-yard field goal. BYU 13–0.
- BYU – Brent Johnson 21-yard field goal. BYU 16–0.

Third quarter

- UTAH – James Teahan 25-yard pass from Randy Gomez (Jeff Hucko kick). BYU 16–7.
- BYU – Dave Francis 20-yard interception return (kick failed). BYU 22–7.

Fourth quarter

- UTAH – Jeff Hucko 37-yard field goal. BYU 22–10.
- UTAH – Tony Lindsay 42-yard pass from Randy Gomez (Jeff Hucko kick). BYU 22-17.
- UTAH – Frank Henry 19-yard pass from Randy Gomez (pass failed), 2:15. Utah 23-22.

Top passers

- BYU – Jim McMahon – 15/38, 249 yards, TD
- UTAH – Randy Gomez – 20/31, 265 yards, 3 TD, 2 INT

Top rushers

- BYU – Lloyd Jones – 1 rush, 32 yards
- UTAH – Tony Lindsay – 30 rushes, 104 yards

Top receivers

- BYU – Lloyd Jones – 4 receptions, 67 yards
- UTAH – James Teahan – 5 receptions, 85 yards, TD

External videos
- Game highlights

== Roster ==
1978 BYU Cougars football team roster
Players
Coaches
Offense

Pos.	#	Name	Class
TE	85	Clay Brown	So
QB	10	Royce Bybee (injured)
WR	29	Mike Chronister	Sr
WR	3	Scott Collie (injured)	Fr
OT	72	Nick Eyre	So
WR	87	Lloyd Jones	So
QB	9	Jim McMahon	So
WR	3	Rainey Meszaros	Fr
OT	64	Andy Reid	So
TE	92	Tod Thompson	Sr
WR	25	Kent Tingey	Jr
QB	6	Marc Wilson	Jr
RB	4	Casey Wingard	Sr
WR	7	Stan Younger	So

Defense

Pos.	#	Name	Class
DB	11	Dean Bona	So
DB	12	Mark Brady (injured)
DB	13	Steve Brady	Fr
DB	13	Steve Corson	Sr
DB	21	Jason Coloma	Sr
DB	8	Dave Francis	So
DE	74	John Kormylo	Sr
DB	15	Dave McKee	Jr
LB	1	Mike Mees	Fr
DE	83	Mat Mendenhall	Jr
DB	5	Bob Prested (injured)
LB	41	Glen Redd	So
DB	0	Greg Sargent	So
DB	43	Bill Schoepflin	So
DT	79	Doug Stromberg	Jr
DE	9	Ron Velasco	Sr
DB	14	Kevin Walker	Fr
LB	59	Kyle Whittingham	Fr

Special teams

Pos.	#	Name	Class
K	2	Brent Johnson	Jr
K	1	Rob Kittell	So
P	9	Jim McMahon	So
K	3	Craig Wing	Sr

Head coach

- LaVell Edwards

Coordinators/assistant coaches

Legend

- (C) Team captain
- (S) Suspended
- (I) Ineligible
- Injured
- Redshirt

Roster
