= 1978 Wyoming Cowboys football team =

American college football season

1978 Wyoming Cowboys football
- Conference: Western Athletic Conference
- Record: 5–7 (4–2 WAC)
- Head coach: Bill Lewis (2nd season)
- Captains: Ken Fantetti; Marc Cousins
- Home stadium: War Memorial Stadium

1978 Western Athletic Conference football standings
	Conf.					Overall
Team	W		L		T	W		L		T
BYU $	5	–	1	–	0	9	–	4	–	0
Utah	4	–	2	–	0	8	–	3	–	0
Wyoming	4	–	2	–	0	5	–	7	–	0
New Mexico	3	–	3	–	0	7	–	5	–	0
Colorado State	2	–	4	–	0	5	–	6	–	0
San Diego State	2	–	4	–	0	4	–	7	–	0
UTEP	1	–	5	–	0	1	–	11	–	0
$ – Conference champion

The 1978 Wyoming Cowboys football team was an American football team that represented the University of Wyoming as a member of the Western Athletic Conference (WAC) during the 1978 NCAA Division I-A football season. In their second season under head coach Bill Lewis, the Cowboys compiled a 5–7 record (4–2 against conference opponents), finished third out of seven teams in the WAC, and outscored opponents by a total of 253 to 245. They played their home games at War Memorial Stadium in Laramie, Wyoming.

== Schedule ==
Date	Opponent	Site	Result	Attendance	Source
September 16	South Dakota*	War Memorial Stadium; Laramie, WY	W 30–11	22,878	
September 23	at No. 6 Texas*	Texas Memorial Stadium; Austin, TX	L 3–17	60,000	
September 30	Utah State*	War Memorial Stadium; Laramie, WY (rivalry)	L 13–20	23,257	
October 7	New Mexico	War Memorial Stadium; Laramie, WY	L 15–19	26,458	
October 14	San Diego State	War Memorial Stadium; Laramie, WY	W 31–22	27,471	
October 21	Utah	War Memorial Stadium; Laramie, WY	W 34–21	20,758	
October 28	at Colorado State	Hughes Stadium; Fort Collins, CO (rivalry)	W 13–3	28,651	
November 4	at BYU	Cougar Stadium; Provo, UT	L 14–48	30,415	
November 11	at UNLV*	Las Vegas Silver Bowl; Whitney, NV	L 10–12	18,374	
November 18	at Hawaii*	Aloha Stadium; Halawa, HI (rivalry)	L 22–27	40,182	
November 25	at UTEP	Sun Bowl; El Paso, TX	W 51–21	17,400	
December 2	at LSU*	Tiger Stadium; Baton Rouge, LA	L 17–24	64,458	
*Non-conference game; Rankings from AP Poll released prior to the game
