= 1994 Colorado State Rams football team =

American college football season

1994 Colorado State Rams football
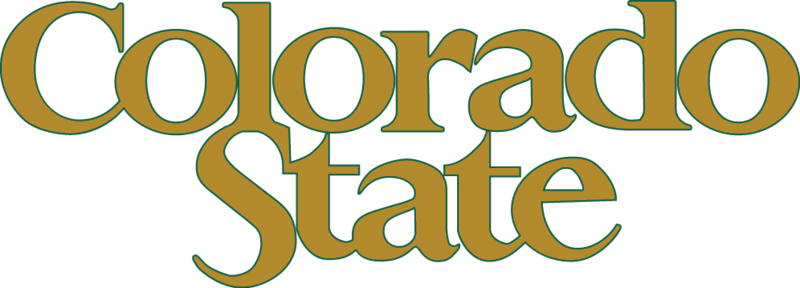

WAC champion

Holiday Bowl, L 14–24 vs. Michigan
- Conference: Western Athletic Conference

Ranking
- Coaches: No. 14
- AP: No. 16
- Record: 10–2 (7–1 WAC)
- Head coach: Sonny Lubick (2nd season)
- Offensive coordinator: Dave Lay (4th season)
- Defensive coordinator: Larry Kerr (2nd season)
- Home stadium: Hughes Stadium

1994 Western Athletic Conference football standings
	Conf.					Overall
Team	W		L		T	W		L		T
No. 16 Colorado State $	7	–	1	–	0	10	–	2	–	0
No. 10 Utah	6	–	2	–	0	10	–	2	–	0
No. 18 BYU	6	–	2	–	0	10	–	3	–	0
Air Force	6	–	2	–	0	8	–	4	–	0
Wyoming	4	–	4	–	0	6	–	6	–	0
New Mexico	4	–	4	–	0	5	–	7	–	0
Fresno State	3	–	4	–	1	5	–	7	–	1
San Diego State	2	–	6	–	0	4	–	7	–	0
UTEP	1	–	6	–	1	3	–	7	–	1
Hawaii	0	–	8	–	0	3	–	8	–	1
$ – Conference champion; Rankings from AP Poll

The 1994 Colorado State Rams football team represented Colorado State University in the 1994 NCAA Division I-A football season. This was the 98th year of football at CSU and the second under Sonny Lubick. The Rams played their home games at Hughes Stadium in Fort Collins, Colorado. They finished the season 10–2, and 7–1 in the Western Athletic Conference. As champions of the WAC, they were invited to the 1994 Holiday Bowl, where they lost to the Michigan Wolverines.

== Schedule ==
Date	Opponent	Rank	Site	TV	Result	Attendance
September 3	at Air Force		Falcon Stadium; Colorado Springs, CO (rivalry)		W 34–21	43,979
September 10	Utah State*		Hughes Stadium; Fort Collins, CO		W 41–16	28,979
September 17	at No. 22 BYU		Cougar Stadium; Provo, UT		W 28–21	60,121
September 24	San Diego State		Hughes Stadium; Fort Collins, CO		W 19–17	32,618
October 1	at New Mexico	No. 24	University Stadium; Albuquerque, NM		W 28–21	29,236
October 8	at No. 6 Arizona*	No. 23	Arizona Stadium; Tucson, AZ		W 21–16	56,534
October 15	UTEP	No. 13	Hughes Stadium; Fort Collins, CO		W 47–9	27,837
October 22	No. 18 Utah	No. 12	Hughes Stadium; Fort Collins, CO	ABC	L 31–45	39,107
November 5	Wyoming	No. 14	Hughes Stadium; Fort Collins, CO (Border War)		W 35–24	35,514
November 12	Arkansas State*	No. 10	Hughes Stadium; Fort Collins, CO		W 48–3	23,741
November 19	at Fresno State	No. 10	Bulldog Stadium; Fresno, CA		W 44–42	37,241
December 30	vs. No. 20 Michigan*	No. 10	Jack Murphy Stadium; San Diego, CA (Holiday Bowl)	ESPN	L 14–24	59,453
*Non-conference game; Rankings from AP Poll released prior to the game

== Game summaries ==
=== Vs. Michigan (Holiday Bowl) ===
Michigan vs. Colorado State

Team	1	2	3	4	Total
• No. 20 Wolverines	10	7	7	0	24
No. 10 Rams	7	0	0	7	14

- Date: December 30
- Location: Jack Murphy Stadium, San Diego, California
- Game attendance: 59,453

== Roster ==
1994 Colorado State Rams football team roster
Players
Coaches
Offense

Pos.	#	Name	Class
QB	7	Anthoney Hill	Sr
QB	13	Moses Moreno	Fr

Defense

Pos.	#	Name	Class

Special teams

Pos.	#	Name	Class

Head coach

- Sonny Lubick

Coordinators/assistant coaches

- Urban Meyer – Wide receivers
- Brian Schneider GA

Legend

- (C) Team captain
- (S) Suspended
- (I) Ineligible
- Injured
- Redshirt

== Team players in the NFL ==
No Colorado State players were selected in the 1995 NFL draft.
