= 1978 New Mexico Lobos football team =

American college football season

1978 New Mexico Lobos football
- Conference: Western Athletic Conference
- Record: 7–5 (3–3 WAC)
- Head coach: Bill Mondt (5th season)
- Home stadium: University Stadium

1978 Western Athletic Conference football standings
	Conf.					Overall
Team	W		L		T	W		L		T
BYU $	5	–	1	–	0	9	–	4	–	0
Utah	4	–	2	–	0	8	–	3	–	0
Wyoming	4	–	2	–	0	5	–	7	–	0
New Mexico	3	–	3	–	0	7	–	5	–	0
Colorado State	2	–	4	–	0	5	–	6	–	0
San Diego State	2	–	4	–	0	4	–	7	–	0
UTEP	1	–	5	–	0	1	–	11	–	0
$ – Conference champion

The 1978 New Mexico Lobos football team was an American football team that represented the University of New Mexico in the Western Athletic Conference (WAC) during the 1978 NCAA Division I-A football season. In their fifth season under head coach Bill Mondt, the Lobos compiled a 7–5 record (3–3 against WAC opponents) and outscored opponents by a total of 284 to 205.

The team's statistical leaders included Brad Wright with 1,925 passing yards, Mike Williams with 1,015 rushing yards, Ricky Martin with 594 receiving yards, and kicker Alan Moore with 64 points scored.

== Schedule ==
Date	Opponent	Site	Result	Attendance	Source
September 9	at Hawaii*	Aloha Stadium; Halawa, HI	L 16–22	40,701	
September 16	at Wichita State*	Cessna Stadium; Wichita, KS	W 16–14	18,016	
September 23	UNLV*	University Stadium; Albuquerque, NM	W 24–0	17,291	
September 30	BYU	University Stadium; Albuquerque, NM	L 23–27	24,892	
October 7	at Wyoming	War Memorial Stadium; Laramie, WY	W 19–15	26,458	
October 14	Texas Tech*^{†}	University Stadium; Albuquerque, NM	L 23–36	23,167	
October 21	New Mexico State*	University Stadium; Albuquerque, NM (rivalry)	W 35–20	17,056	
October 28	at UTEP	Sun Bowl; El Paso, TX	W 21–0	18,650	
November 4	at Utah	Robert Rice Stadium; Salt Lake City, UT	W 24–12	24,182	
November 11	Colorado State	University Stadium; Albuquerque, NM	L 15–26	14,747	
November 18	Pacific (CA)*	University Stadium; Albuquerque, NM	W 44–6	11,910	
November 25	at San Diego State	San Diego Stadium; San Diego, CA	L 24–27	30,011	
*Non-conference game; ^{†}Homecoming
