= 1994 Hawaii Rainbow Warriors football team =

American college football season

1994 Hawaii Rainbow Warriors football
- Conference: Western Athletic Conference
- Record: 3–8–1 (0–8 WAC)
- Head coach: Bob Wagner (8th season)
- Offensive coordinator: Paul Johnson (8th season)
- Offensive scheme: Triple option
- Defensive coordinator: Chris Smeland (2nd season)
- Base defense: 4–3
- Home stadium: Aloha Stadium

1994 Western Athletic Conference football standings
	Conf.					Overall
Team	W		L		T	W		L		T
No. 16 Colorado State $	7	–	1	–	0	10	–	2	–	0
No. 10 Utah	6	–	2	–	0	10	–	2	–	0
No. 18 BYU	6	–	2	–	0	10	–	3	–	0
Air Force	6	–	2	–	0	8	–	4	–	0
Wyoming	4	–	4	–	0	6	–	6	–	0
New Mexico	4	–	4	–	0	5	–	7	–	0
Fresno State	3	–	4	–	1	5	–	7	–	1
San Diego State	2	–	6	–	0	4	–	7	–	0
UTEP	1	–	6	–	1	3	–	7	–	1
Hawaii	0	–	8	–	0	3	–	8	–	1
$ – Conference champion; Rankings from AP Poll

The 1994 Hawaii Rainbow Warriors football team represented the University of Hawaiʻi at Mānoa in the Western Athletic Conference during the 1994 NCAA Division I-A football season. In their eighth season under head coach Bob Wagner, the Rainbow Warriors compiled a 3–8–1 record.

== Schedule ==
Date	Opponent	Site	Result	Attendance
September 3	BYU	Aloha Stadium; Halawa, HI	L 12–13	48,352
September 10	Oregon*	Aloha Stadium; Halawa, HI	W 36–16	40,492
September 17	at California*	California Memorial Stadium; Berkeley, CA	W 21–7	41,000
September 24	Fresno State	Aloha Stadium; Halawa, HI (rivalry)	L 16–31	41,405
October 1	at UTEP	Sun Bowl; El Paso, TX	L 28–34	21,238
October 8	New Mexico	Aloha Stadium; Halawa, HI	L 21–38	37,061
October 15	at No. 21 Utah	Robert Rice Stadium; Salt Lake City, UT	L 3–14	30,210
October 29	at San Diego State	Jack Murphy Stadium; San Diego, CA	L 23–38	34,096
November 12	Southeast Missouri State*	Aloha Stadium; Halawa, HI	W 34–0	33,675
November 19	Wyoming^{†}	Aloha Stadium; Halawa, HI (rivalry)	L 10–13	35,654
November 26	Missouri*	Aloha Stadium; Halawa, HI	T 32–32	33,979
December 3	Air Force	Aloha Stadium; Halawa, HI (rivalry)	L 24–37	36,371
*Non-conference game; ^{†}Homecoming; Rankings from AP Poll released prior to the game
