= 1994 Wyoming Cowboys football team =

American college football season

1994 Wyoming Cowboys football
- Conference: Western Athletic Conference
- Record: 6–6 (4–4 WAC)
- Head coach: Joe Tiller (4th season)
- Offensive coordinator: Larry Korpitz (4th season)
- Defensive coordinator: Scott Downing (4th season)
- Captains: John Burrough; Ryan Christopherson; Tyrone Williams
- Home stadium: War Memorial Stadium

1994 Western Athletic Conference football standings
	Conf.					Overall
Team	W		L		T	W		L		T
No. 16 Colorado State $	7	–	1	–	0	10	–	2	–	0
No. 10 Utah	6	–	2	–	0	10	–	2	–	0
No. 18 BYU	6	–	2	–	0	10	–	3	–	0
Air Force	6	–	2	–	0	8	–	4	–	0
Wyoming	4	–	4	–	0	6	–	6	–	0
New Mexico	4	–	4	–	0	5	–	7	–	0
Fresno State	3	–	4	–	1	5	–	7	–	1
San Diego State	2	–	6	–	0	4	–	7	–	0
UTEP	1	–	6	–	1	3	–	7	–	1
Hawaii	0	–	8	–	0	3	–	8	–	1
$ – Conference champion; Rankings from AP Poll

The 1994 Wyoming Cowboys football team represented the University of Wyoming as a member of the Western Athletic Conference (WAC) during the 1994 NCAA Division I-A football season. Led by fourth-year head coach Joe Tiller, the Cowboys compiled an overall record of 6–6 with a mark of 4–4 in conference play, tying for fifth place in the WAC. Wyoming played home games at War Memorial Stadium.

== Schedule ==
Date	Opponent	Site	Result	Attendance
September 3	UTEP	War Memorial Stadium; Laramie, WY	W 36–13	20,050
September 10	at Oregon State*	Parker Stadium; Corvallis, OR	L 31–44	28,037
September 17	Tulsa*	War Memorial Stadium; Laramie, WY	W 17–7	21,547
September 24	at Utah	Robert Rice Stadium; Salt Lake City, UT	L 7–41	34,607
October 1	at No. 2 Nebraska*	Memorial Stadium; Lincoln, NE	L 32–42	75,333
October 8	Northeast Louisiana*	War Memorial Stadium; Laramie, WY	W 28–14	
October 15	at Fresno State	Bulldog Stadium; Fresno, CA	L 24–38	35,708
October 22	San Diego State	War Memorial Stadium; Laramie, WY	W 52–35	21,132
October 29	Air Force	War Memorial Stadium; Laramie, WY	L 17–34	
November 5	at No. 14 Colorado State	Hughes Stadium; Fort Collins, CO (Border War)	L 24–35	35,514
November 12	New Mexico	War Memorial Stadium; Laramie, WY	W 38–28	
November 19	at Hawaii	Aloha Stadium; Halawa, HI	W 13–10	35,654
*Non-conference game; Rankings from AP Poll released prior to the game
