= 1978 Colorado State Rams football team =

American college football season

1978 Colorado State Rams football
- Conference: Western Athletic Conference
- Record: 5–6 (2–4 WAC)
- Head coach: Sark Arslanian (6th season)
- Offensive coordinator: Charles Armey (2nd season)
- Defensive coordinator: Scott Henington (2nd season)
- Home stadium: Hughes Stadium

1978 Western Athletic Conference football standings
	Conf.					Overall
Team	W		L		T	W		L		T
BYU $	5	–	1	–	0	9	–	4	–	0
Utah	4	–	2	–	0	8	–	3	–	0
Wyoming	4	–	2	–	0	5	–	7	–	0
New Mexico	3	–	3	–	0	7	–	5	–	0
Colorado State	2	–	4	–	0	5	–	6	–	0
San Diego State	2	–	4	–	0	4	–	7	–	0
UTEP	1	–	5	–	0	1	–	11	–	0
$ – Conference champion

The 1978 Colorado State Rams football team was an American football team that represented Colorado State University in the Western Athletic Conference (WAC) during the 1978 NCAA Division I-A football season. In its sixth season under head coach Sark Arslanian, the team compiled a 5–6 record (2–4 against WAC opponents).

The team's statistical leaders included Steve Fairchild with 905 passing yards, Larry Jones with 898 rushing yards, and Mark R. Bell with 459 receiving yards.

Senior defensive end Mike Bell was consensus first-team All-American

== Schedule ==
Date	Opponent	Site	Result	Attendance	Source
September 16	Utah State*	Hughes Stadium; Fort Collins, CO	L 20–21	24,285	
September 23	at BYU	Cougar Stadium; Provo, UT	L 6–32	31,052	
September 30	at Utah	Robert Rice Stadium; Salt Lake City, UT	L 6–30	27,821	
October 7	UTEP	Hughes Stadium; Fort Collins, CO	W 39–29	24,173	
October 14	at Air Force*	Falcon Stadium; Colorado Springs, CO (rivalry)	W 31–13	22,386	
October 21	UNLV*^{†}	Hughes Stadium; Fort Collins, CO	L 6–33	21,585	
October 28	Wyoming	Hughes Stadium; Fort Collins, CO (rivalry)	L 3–13	28,651	
November 4	at San Diego State	San Diego Stadium; San Diego, CA	L 31–34	38,494	
November 11	at New Mexico	University Stadium; Albuquerque, NM	W 26–15	14,747	
November 18	West Virginia*	Hughes Stadium; Fort Collins, CO	W 50–14	12,782	
November 23	at Pacific (CA)*	Pacific Memorial Stadium; Stockton, CA	W 20–13	5,000	
*Non-conference game; ^{†}Homecoming

== Team players in the NFL ==
Player	Position	Round	Pick	NFL club
Mike Bell	Defensive end	1	2	Kansas City Chiefs
Mark E. Bell	Tight end	4	102	Seattle Seahawks
Mark R. Bell	Wide receiver	5	130	St. Louis Cardinals
Bill Leer	Center	11	292	Atlanta Falcons
