= 1994 BYU Cougars football team =

American college football season

1994 BYU Cougars football

Copper Bowl champion

Copper Bowl, W 31–6 vs. Oklahoma
- Conference: Western Athletic Conference

Ranking
- Coaches: No. 10
- AP: No. 18
- Record: 10–3 (6–2 WAC)
- Head coach: LaVell Edwards (23rd season)
- Offensive coordinator: Roger French (14th season)
- Offensive scheme: West Coast
- Defensive coordinator: Ken Schmidt (4th season)
- Base defense: 4–3
- Home stadium: Cougar Stadium

1994 Western Athletic Conference football standings
| | Conf. | | | | | Overall |
| Team | W | | L | | T | W | | L | | T |
|---|---|---|---|---|---|---|---|---|---|---|
| No. 16 Colorado State $ | 7 | – | 1 | – | 0 | 10 | – | 2 | – | 0 |
| No. 10 Utah | 6 | – | 2 | – | 0 | 10 | – | 2 | – | 0 |
| No. 18 BYU | 6 | – | 2 | – | 0 | 10 | – | 3 | – | 0 |
| Air Force | 6 | – | 2 | – | 0 | 8 | – | 4 | – | 0 |
| Wyoming | 4 | – | 4 | – | 0 | 6 | – | 6 | – | 0 |
| New Mexico | 4 | – | 4 | – | 0 | 5 | – | 7 | – | 0 |
| Fresno State | 3 | – | 4 | – | 1 | 5 | – | 7 | – | 1 |
| San Diego State | 2 | – | 6 | – | 0 | 4 | – | 7 | – | 0 |
| UTEP | 1 | – | 6 | – | 1 | 3 | – | 7 | – | 1 |
| Hawaii | 0 | – | 8 | – | 0 | 3 | – | 8 | – | 1 |
$ – Conference champion; Rankings from AP Poll

The 1994 BYU Cougars football team represented Brigham Young University (BYU) in the 1994 NCAA Division I-A football season. The Cougars were led by 23rd-year head coach LaVell Edwards and played their home games at Cougar Stadium in Provo, Utah. BYU finished with a record of 10–3 (6–2 WAC) to finish tied for second in the Western Athletic Conference. This was the first season since 1988 that the Cougars failed to win at least a share of the WAC conference title. BYU was invited to the 1994 Copper Bowl, where they defeated Oklahoma. They were ranked 10th in the final Coaches Poll and 18th in the final AP Poll.

== Schedule ==
| Date | Opponent | Rank | Site | TV | Result | Attendance | Source |
|---|---|---|---|---|---|---|---|
| September 3 | at Hawaii | | Aloha Stadium; Halawa, HI | | W 13–12 | 48,352 | |
| September 10 | at Air Force | | Falcon Stadium; Colorado Springs, CO | | W 45–21 | | |
| September 17 | Colorado State | No. 22 | Cougar Stadium; Provo, UT | | L 21–28 | 60,121 | |
| September 24 | New Mexico | | Cougar Stadium; Provo, Utah | | W 49–47 | | |
| September 30 | Utah State* | | Cougar Stadium; Provo, UT (rivalry) | | W 34–6 | 63,164 | |
| October 8 | at Fresno State | | Bulldog Stadium; Fresno, CA | | W 32–30 | 41,031 | |
| October 15 | at No. 17 Notre Dame* | | Notre Dame Stadium; Notre Dame, IN | NBC | W 21–14 | 59,075 | |
| October 22 | at UTEP | No. 21 | Sun Bowl; El Paso, TX | | W 34–28 | 38,135 | |
| October 29 | Arizona State* | No. 20 | Cougar Stadium; Provo, UT | | L 15–36 | 65,208 | |
| November 5 | Northeast Louisiana* | No. 25 | Cougar Stadium; Provo, UT | | W 24–10 | 57,579 | |
| November 10 | San Diego State | No. 23 | Cougar Stadium; Provo, UT | ESPN | W 35–28 | 58,576 | |
| November 19 | at No. 21 Utah | No. 20 | Robert Rice Stadium; Salt Lake City, UT (Holy War) | KUTV | L 31–34 | 34,139 | |
| December 29 | vs. Oklahoma* | No. 22 | Arizona Stadium; Tucson, AZ (Copper Bowl) | ESPN | W 31–6 | 45,122 | |
*Non-conference game; Rankings from AP Poll released prior to the game

== Roster ==
1994 BYU Cougars football team roster
Players
Coaches
Offense

| Pos. | # | Name | Class |
|---|---|---|---|
| FB | 45 | T. D. Biegel | Sr |
| OT | 76 | Eli Herring | Sr |
| TE | 96 | Chad Lewis | So |
| WR | 80 | Kaipo McGuire | So |
| TE | 88 | Itula Mili | So |
| WR | 42 | Tim Nowatzke | Sr |
| G | 70 | Evan Pilgrim | Sr |
| QB | 7 | John Walsh | Sr |

Defense

| Pos. | # | Name | Class |
|---|---|---|---|
| DB | 9 | Jason Anderson | Fr |
| DE | 56 | Travis Hall | Sr |
| LB | 46 | Shay Muirbrook | So |

Special teams

| Pos. | # | Name | Class |

Head coach

- LaVell Edwards

Coordinators/assistant coaches

Legend

- (C) Team captain
- (S) Suspended
- (I) Ineligible
- Injured
- Redshirt

Roster

== 1995 NFL draft ==
| Player | Position | Round | Pick | NFL club |
| Evan Pilgrim | Guard | 3 | 87 | Chicago Bears |
| Tim Hanshaw | Tight end | 4 | 127 | San Francisco 49ers |
| Travis Hall | Defensive tackle | 6 | 181 | Atlanta Falcons |
| Eli Herring | Tackle | 6 | 190 | Oakland Raiders |
| John Walsh | Quarterback | 7 | 213 | Cincinnati Bengals |
