= 1994 Fresno State Bulldogs football team =

American college football season

1994 Fresno State Bulldogs football
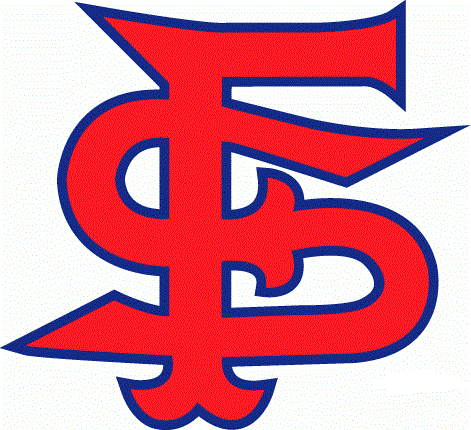
- Conference: Western Athletic Conference
- Record: 5–7–1 (3–4–1 WAC)
- Head coach: Jim Sweeney (17th season)
- Offensive coordinator: Jeff Tedford (2nd season)
- Defensive coordinator: Leon Burtnett (1st season)
- Home stadium: Bulldog Stadium

1994 Western Athletic Conference football standings
| | Conf. | | | | | Overall |
| Team | W | | L | | T | W | | L | | T |
|---|---|---|---|---|---|---|---|---|---|---|
| No. 16 Colorado State $ | 7 | – | 1 | – | 0 | 10 | – | 2 | – | 0 |
| No. 10 Utah | 6 | – | 2 | – | 0 | 10 | – | 2 | – | 0 |
| No. 18 BYU | 6 | – | 2 | – | 0 | 10 | – | 3 | – | 0 |
| Air Force | 6 | – | 2 | – | 0 | 8 | – | 4 | – | 0 |
| Wyoming | 4 | – | 4 | – | 0 | 6 | – | 6 | – | 0 |
| New Mexico | 4 | – | 4 | – | 0 | 5 | – | 7 | – | 0 |
| Fresno State | 3 | – | 4 | – | 1 | 5 | – | 7 | – | 1 |
| San Diego State | 2 | – | 6 | – | 0 | 4 | – | 7 | – | 0 |
| UTEP | 1 | – | 6 | – | 1 | 3 | – | 7 | – | 1 |
| Hawaii | 0 | – | 8 | – | 0 | 3 | – | 8 | – | 1 |
$ – Conference champion; Rankings from AP Poll

The 1994 Fresno State Bulldogs football team represented California State University, Fresno as a member of the Western Athletic Conference (WAC) during the 1994 NCAA Division I-A football season. Led by 17th-year head coach Jim Sweeney, Fresno State compiled an overall record of 5–7–1 with a mark of 3–4–1 in conference play, placing seventh in the WAC. The Bulldogs played their home games at Bulldog Stadium in Fresno, California.

== Schedule ==
| Date | Opponent | Site | Result | Attendance |
|---|---|---|---|---|
| August 29 | at No. 20 Ohio State* | Anaheim Stadium; Anaheim, CA (Pigskin Classic) | L 10–34 | 28,513 |
| September 3 | San Jose State* | Bulldog Stadium; Fresno, CA (rivalry) | W 45–13 | 36,868 |
| September 10 | at Washington State* | Martin Stadium; Pullman, WA | L 3–24 | 24,107 |
| September 17 | Oregon State* | Bulldog Stadium; Fresno, CA | W 24–14 | 36,379 |
| September 24 | at Hawaii | Aloha Stadium; Halawa, HI (rivalry) | W 31–16 | 41,405 |
| October 8 | BYU | Bulldog Stadium; Fresno, CA | L 30–32 | 41,031 |
| October 15 | Wyoming | Bulldog Stadium; Fresno, CA | W 38–24 | 35,708 |
| October 22 | at Air Force | Falcon Stadium; Colorado Springs, CO | L 7–42 | 39,065 |
| October 29 | New Mexico | Bulldog Stadium; Fresno, CA | L 32–49 | 33,641 |
| November 5 | Nevada* | Bulldog Stadium; Fresno, CA | L 35–62 | 32,328 |
| November 12 | at UTEP | Sun Bowl; El Paso, TX | T 30–30 | 15,328 |
| November 19 | No. 10 Colorado State | Bulldog Stadium; Fresno, CA | L 42–44 | 37,241 |
| November 26 | at San Diego State | Jack Murphy Stadium; San Diego, CA (rivalry) | W 49–42 | 23,344 |
*Non-conference game; Rankings from AP Poll released prior to the game

== Team players in the NFL ==
The following were selected in the 1995 NFL draft.

| Player | Position | Round | Overall | NFL team |
| David Dunn | Wide receiver | 5 | 139 | Cincinnati Bengals |

The following finished their college career in 1994, were not drafted, but played in the NFL.

| Player | Position | First NFL team |
| Latario Rachal | Wide receiver | San Diego Chargers |
