= David Gray (American football) =

American football player (born 1955)

No. 21
- Position: Cornerback

Personal information
- Born: March 28, 1955 (age 71); San Diego, California, U.S.
- Listed height: 6 ft 0 in (1.83 m)
- Listed weight: 187 lb (85 kg)

Career information
- High school: Manual Arts (Los Angeles)
- College: San Diego State
- NFL draft: 1978: undrafted

Career history
- Houston Oilers (1978)*; New Orleans Saints (1979)
- * Offseason or practice squad member only
- Stats at Pro Football Reference

David Alvin Gray (born March 28, 1955) is an American former professional football cornerback who played for the New Orleans Saints of the National Football League (NFL). He played college football for the Oregon State Beavers and San Diego State Aztecs.

== Early life ==
David Alvin Gray was born on March 28, 1955, in San Diego, California. He attended Manual Arts High School in Los Angeles.

== College career ==
Gray played junior college football at East Los Angeles College as a cornerback from 1973 to 1974. He played college football for the Oregon State Beavers in 1975. He transferred to San Diego State University in 1976 but had to sit to the 1976 season due to NCAA transfer rules. Gray then played for the San Diego State Aztecs in 1977.

== Professional career ==
After going undrafted in the 1978 NFL draft, Gray signed with the Houston Oilers on May 26. He was released on August 13 before the second game of the 1978 preseason.

Gray was signed by the New Orleans Saints on March 27, 1979. He played in all 16 games, starting six, at cornerback for the Saints during the 1979 season and recorded one interception for 32 yards. He started at right cornerback in place of Eric Felton. Gray was released by New Orleans on August 26, 1980, after the third of four preseason games.

== Personal life ==
Gray lived in Los Angeles during his NFL career.
