= 1994 Utah Utes football team =

American college football season

1994 Utah Utes football

Freedom Bowl champion

Freedom Bowl, W 16–13 vs. vs. Arizona
- Conference: Western Athletic Conference

Ranking
- Coaches: No. 8
- AP: No. 10
- Record: 10–2 (6–2 WAC)
- Head coach: Ron McBride (5th season)
- Offensive coordinator: Rick Rasnick (4th season)
- Offensive scheme: Multiple
- Defensive coordinator: Fred Whittingham (3rd season)
- Base defense: 4–3
- Home stadium: Robert Rice Stadium

1994 Western Athletic Conference football standings
	Conf.					Overall
Team	W		L		T	W		L		T
No. 16 Colorado State $	7	–	1	–	0	10	–	2	–	0
No. 10 Utah	6	–	2	–	0	10	–	2	–	0
No. 18 BYU	6	–	2	–	0	10	–	3	–	0
Air Force	6	–	2	–	0	8	–	4	–	0
Wyoming	4	–	4	–	0	6	–	6	–	0
New Mexico	4	–	4	–	0	5	–	7	–	0
Fresno State	3	–	4	–	1	5	–	7	–	1
San Diego State	2	–	6	–	0	4	–	7	–	0
UTEP	1	–	6	–	1	3	–	7	–	1
Hawaii	0	–	8	–	0	3	–	8	–	1
$ – Conference champion; Rankings from AP Poll

The 1994 Utah Utes football team represented the University of Utah as a member of the Western Athletic Conference (WAC) during the 1994 NCAA Division I-A football season. In their fifth season under head coach Ron McBride, the Utes compiled an overall record of 10–2 record with a mark of 6–2 against conference opponents, placing in a three-way tie for second in the WAC, and outscored their opponents 426 to 210. Utah was invited to the Freedom Bowl, where they beat Arizona. The team played home games at Robert Rice Stadium in Salt Lake City.

The 1994 season was the most successful during McBride's tenure at Utah. The Utes beat three ranked teams and finished the season ranked No. 10 in the AP Poll and No. 8 in the Coaches Poll.

== Schedule ==
Date	Time	Opponent	Rank	Site	TV	Result	Attendance	Source
September 3	7:00 pm	at Utah State*		Romney Stadium; Logan, UT (Battle of the Brothers)	KJZZ	W 32–17	31,287	
September 10	7:00 pm	Idaho State*		Robert Rice Stadium; Salt Lake City, UT		W 66–0	30,064	
September 17	2:00 pm	at Oregon*		Autzen Stadium; Eugene, OR		W 34–16	25,358	
September 24	7:00 pm	Wyoming		Robert Rice Stadium; Salt Lake City, UT		W 41–7	34,607	
October 8	7:00 pm	at San Diego State	No. 25	Jack Murphy Stadium; San Diego, CA	KUTV	W 38–22	34,393	
October 15	1:00 pm	Hawaii	No. 21	Robert Rice Stadium; Salt Lake City, UT		W 14–3	30,120	
October 22	1:30 pm	at No. 12 Colorado State	No. 18	Hughes Stadium; Fort Collins, CO	ABC	W 45–31	39,107	
October 29	1:30 pm	UTEP^{†}	No. 12	Robert Rice Stadium; Salt Lake City, UT		W 52–7	32,620	
November 5	1:00 pm	at New Mexico	No. 9	University Stadium; Albuquerque, NM		L 21–23	30,743	
November 12	1:30 pm	at Air Force	No. 12	Falcon Stadium; Colorado Springs, CO		L 33–40	38,525	
November 19	1:00 pm	No. 20 BYU	No. 21	Robert Rice Stadium; Salt Lake City, UT (Holy War)	KUTV	W 34–31	34,139	
December 27	7:00 pm	vs. No. 15 Arizona*	No. 14	Anaheim Stadium; Anaheim, CA (Freedom Bowl)	Raycom	W 16–13	27,477	
*Non-conference game; ^{†}Homecoming; Rankings from AP Poll released prior to the game; All times are in Mountain time

== Roster ==
1994 Utah Utes football team roster
Players
Coaches
Offense

Pos.	#	Name	Class
WR	1	Kevin Dyson	Fr
WR	18	Curtis Marsh	Sr
QB	10	Mike McCoy	Sr
C	56	Lance Scott	Sr

Defense

Pos.	#	Name	Class
DT	83	Luther Elliss	Sr
DE	36	Bronzell Miller	Sr

Special teams

Pos.	#	Name	Class

Head coach

- Ron McBride

Coordinators/assistant coaches

Legend

- (C) Team captain
- (S) Suspended
- (I) Ineligible
- Injured
- Redshirt

== NFL draft ==
Four Utah players were selected in the 1995 NFL draft, including first rounder and future pro bowler Luther Elliss.

Player	Position	Round	Pick	NFL team
Luther Elliss	Defensive tackle	1	20	Detroit Lions
Lance Scott	Center	5	165	Arizona Cardinals
Curtis Marsh	Wide receiver	7	219	Jacksonville Jaguars
Bronzell Miller	Defensive end	7	239	St. Louis Rams
