= 1994 San Diego State Aztecs football team =

American college football season

1994 San Diego State Aztecs football
- Conference: Western Athletic Conference
- Record: 4–7 (2–6 WAC)
- Head coach: Ted Tollner (1st season)
- Offensive coordinator: Tom Craft (1st season)
- Offensive scheme: Spread
- Defensive coordinator: Steve Shafer (1st season)
- Base defense: Multiple 4–3
- Home stadium: Jack Murphy Stadium

1994 Western Athletic Conference football standings
	Conf.					Overall
Team	W		L		T	W		L		T
No. 16 Colorado State $	7	–	1	–	0	10	–	2	–	0
No. 10 Utah	6	–	2	–	0	10	–	2	–	0
No. 18 BYU	6	–	2	–	0	10	–	3	–	0
Air Force	6	–	2	–	0	8	–	4	–	0
Wyoming	4	–	4	–	0	6	–	6	–	0
New Mexico	4	–	4	–	0	5	–	7	–	0
Fresno State	3	–	4	–	1	5	–	7	–	1
San Diego State	2	–	6	–	0	4	–	7	–	0
UTEP	1	–	6	–	1	3	–	7	–	1
Hawaii	0	–	8	–	0	3	–	8	–	1
$ – Conference champion; Rankings from AP Poll

The 1994 San Diego State Aztecs football team represented San Diego State University as a member of the Western Athletic Conference (WAC) during the 1994 NCAA Division I-A football season. Led by first-year head coach Ted Tollner, the Aztecs compiled an overall record of 4–7 with a mark of 2–6 conference play, placing eighth in the WAC. The team played home games at Jack Murphy Stadium in San Diego.

== Schedule ==
Date	Opponent	Site	TV	Result	Attendance
September 3	Navy*	Jack Murphy Stadium; San Diego, CA		W 56–14	25,248
September 10	California*	Jack Murphy Stadium; San Diego, CA		W 22–20	40,922
September 17	at Minnesota*	Hubert H. Humphrey Metrodome; Minneapolis, MN		L 17–40	32,212
September 24	at Colorado State	Hughes Stadium; Fort Collins, CO	Prime	L 17–19	32,618
October 1	Air Force	Jack Murphy Stadium; San Diego, CA		L 35–36	33,268
October 8	Utah^{†}	Jack Murphy Stadium; San Diego, CA		L 22–38	34,393
October 15	at New Mexico	University Stadium; Albuquerque, NM		W 20–13	26,831
October 22	at Wyoming	War Memorial Stadium; Laramie, WY	Prime	L 35–52	21,132
October 29	Hawaii	Jack Murphy Stadium; San Diego, CA		W 38–23	34,096
November 10	at No. 23 BYU	Cougar Stadium; Provo, UT	ESPN	L 28–35	58,576
November 25	Fresno State	Jack Murphy Stadium; San Diego, CA (rivalry)		L 42–49	23,344
*Non-conference game; ^{†}Homecoming; Rankings from AP Poll released prior to the game

== Team players in the NFL ==
The following were selected in the 1995 NFL draft.

Player	Position	Round	Overall	NFL team
Jamal Duff	Defensive end – Defensive tackle	6	204	New York Giants

The following finished their college career in 1994, were not drafted, but played in the NFL.

Player	Position	First NFL team
Eric Sutton	Defensive back	1996 Washington Redskins

== Team awards ==
Award	Player
Most Valuable Player (John Simcox Memorial Trophy)	Wayne Pittman
Outstanding Players (Byron H. Chase Memorial Trophy)	Chris Finch, OG; La'Roi Glover, DL; Wayne Pittman, RB; Curtis Shearer, WR; Scott Blade, LB; Ricky Parker, DB
Team captains Dr. R. Hardy / C.E. Peterson Memorial Trophy	Wayne Pittman, Off; Chris Finch, Off; Scott Blade, Def; La'Roi Glover, Def
Most Inspirational Player	Ray Peterson
