= 1994 UTEP Miners football team =

American college football season

1994 UTEP Miners football
- Conference: Western Athletic Conference
- Record: 3–7–1 (1–6–1 WAC)
- Head coach: Charlie Bailey (2nd season)
- Offensive coordinator: Darrell Dickey (1st season)
- Defensive coordinator: Pete Kuharchek (1st season)
- Home stadium: Sun Bowl

1994 Western Athletic Conference football standings
	Conf.					Overall
Team	W		L		T	W		L		T
No. 16 Colorado State $	7	–	1	–	0	10	–	2	–	0
No. 10 Utah	6	–	2	–	0	10	–	2	–	0
No. 18 BYU	6	–	2	–	0	10	–	3	–	0
Air Force	6	–	2	–	0	8	–	4	–	0
Wyoming	4	–	4	–	0	6	–	6	–	0
New Mexico	4	–	4	–	0	5	–	7	–	0
Fresno State	3	–	4	–	1	5	–	7	–	1
San Diego State	2	–	6	–	0	4	–	7	–	0
UTEP	1	–	6	–	1	3	–	7	–	1
Hawaii	0	–	8	–	0	3	–	8	–	1
$ – Conference champion; Rankings from AP Poll

The 1994 UTEP Miners football team was an American football team that represented the University of Texas at El Paso in the Western Athletic Conference during the 1994 NCAA Division I-A football season. In their second year under head coach Charlie Bailey, the team compiled a 3–7–1 record.

== Schedule ==
Date	Opponent	Site	Result	Attendance	Source
September 3	at Wyoming	War Memorial Stadium; Laramie, WY	L 13–36	20,050	
September 10	Eastern Illinois*	Sun Bowl; El Paso, TX	W 22–20	28,229	
September 17	New Mexico State*	Sun Bowl; El Paso, TX (rivalry)	L 22–23	40,260	
September 24	vs. Air Force	Alamodome; San Antonio, TX	L 7–47	22,889	
October 1	Hawaii	Sun Bowl; El Paso, TX	W 34–27	21,258	
October 8	at Tulsa*	Skelly Stadium; Tulsa, OK	W 24–17	17,127	
October 15	at No. 13 Colorado State	Hughes Stadium; Fort Collins, CO	L 9–47	27,837	
October 22	No. 21 BYU^{†}	Sun Bowl; El Paso, TX	L 28–34	38,135	
October 29	at No. 12 Utah	Robert Rice Stadium; Salt Lake City, UT	L 7–52	32,620	
November 12	Fresno State	Sun Bowl; El Paso, TX	T 30–30	15,328	
November 19	at New Mexico	University Stadium; Albuquerque, NM	L 21–25	19,472	
*Non-conference game; ^{†}Homecoming; Rankings from AP Poll released prior to the game
