= 1994 Air Force Falcons football team =

American college football season

1994 Air Force Falcons football
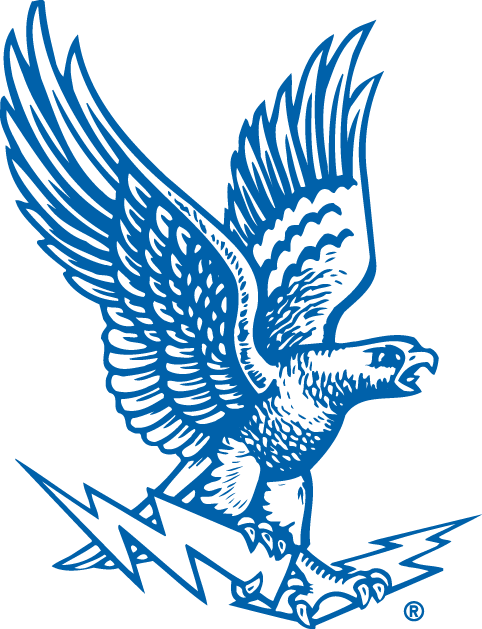
- Conference: Western Athletic Conference
- Record: 8–4 (6–2 WAC)
- Head coach: Fisher DeBerry (11th season)
- Offensive coordinator: Paul Hamilton (5th season)
- Offensive scheme: Wishbone triple option
- Defensive coordinator: Cal McCombs (5th season)
- Base defense: 3–4
- Captain: Game captains
- Home stadium: Falcon Stadium

1994 Western Athletic Conference football standings
	Conf.					Overall
Team	W		L		T	W		L		T
No. 16 Colorado State $	7	–	1	–	0	10	–	2	–	0
No. 10 Utah	6	–	2	–	0	10	–	2	–	0
No. 18 BYU	6	–	2	–	0	10	–	3	–	0
Air Force	6	–	2	–	0	8	–	4	–	0
Wyoming	4	–	4	–	0	6	–	6	–	0
New Mexico	4	–	4	–	0	5	–	7	–	0
Fresno State	3	–	4	–	1	5	–	7	–	1
San Diego State	2	–	6	–	0	4	–	7	–	0
UTEP	1	–	6	–	1	3	–	7	–	1
Hawaii	0	–	8	–	0	3	–	8	–	1
$ – Conference champion; Rankings from AP Poll

The 1994 Air Force Falcons football team represented the United States Air Force Academy as a member of the Western Athletic Conference (WAC) during the 1994 NCAA Division I-A football season. Led by 11th-year head coach Fisher DeBerry, the Falcons compiled an overall record of 8–4 with a mark of 6–2 in conference play, placing in a three-way tie for second in the WAC. The team played home games at Falcon Stadium in Colorado Springs, Colorado

== Schedule ==
Date	Opponent	Site	Result	Attendance	Source
September 3	Colorado State	Falcon Stadium; Colorado Springs, CO (rivalry)	L 21–34	43,979	
September 10	BYU	Falcon Stadium; Colorado Springs, CO	L 21–45		
September 17	Northwestern*	Falcon Stadium; Colorado Springs, CO	L 10–14		
September 24	vs. UTEP	Alamodome; San Antonio, TX	W 47–7	22,889	
October 1	at San Diego State	Jack Murphy Stadium; San Diego, CA	W 36–35	33,268	
October 8	Navy*	Falcon Stadium; Colorado Springs, CO (Commander-in-Chief's Trophy)	W 43–21		
October 22	Fresno State	Falcon Stadium; Colorado Springs, CO	W 42–7	39,065	
October 29	at Wyoming	War Memorial Stadium; Laramie, WY	W 34–17		
November 5	at Army*	Michie Stadium; West Point, NY	W 10–6		
November 12	No. 12 Utah	Falcon Stadium; Colorado Springs, CO	W 40–33	38,525	
November 19	at Notre Dame*	Notre Dame Stadium; Notre Dame, IN (rivalry)	L 30–42	59,075	
December 3	at Hawaii	Aloha Stadium; Halawa, HI (rivalry)	W 37–24	36,371	
*Non-conference game; Rankings from AP Poll released prior to the game

== Roster ==
1994 Air Force Falcons football team roster
Players			Coaches
Offense: Pos. / # / Name / Class; QB / 11 / Beau Morgan / So	Defense: Pos. / # / Name / Class; LB / 51 / Chris Gizzi / Fr	Special teams: Pos. / # / Name / Class	Head coach: Fisher DeBerry; Coordinators/assistant coaches Legend: (C) Team captain; (S) Suspended; (I) Ineligible; Injured; Redshirt

== NFL draft ==
The following Falcon was selected in the 1995 NFL draft following the season.

Round	Pick	Player	Position	NFL team
7	218	Steve Russ	Linebacker	Denver Broncos
