= 1978 UTEP Miners football team =

American college football season

1978 UTEP Miners football
- Conference: Western Athletic Conference
- Record: 1–11 (1–5 WAC)
- Head coach: Bill Michael (2nd season)
- Home stadium: Sun Bowl

1978 Western Athletic Conference football standings
	Conf.					Overall
Team	W		L		T	W		L		T
BYU $	5	–	1	–	0	9	–	4	–	0
Utah	4	–	2	–	0	8	–	3	–	0
Wyoming	4	–	2	–	0	5	–	7	–	0
New Mexico	3	–	3	–	0	7	–	5	–	0
Colorado State	2	–	4	–	0	5	–	6	–	0
San Diego State	2	–	4	–	0	4	–	7	–	0
UTEP	1	–	5	–	0	1	–	11	–	0
$ – Conference champion

The 1978 UTEP Miners football team was an American football team that represented the University of Texas at El Paso in the Western Athletic Conference during the 1978 NCAA Division I-A football season. In their second year under head coach Bill Michael, the team compiled a 1–11 record.

== Schedule ==
Date	Opponent	Site	Result	Attendance	Source
September 2	at North Texas State*	Fouts Field; Denton, TX	L 0–49	17,200	
September 9	Air Force*	Sun Bowl; El Paso, TX	L 25–34	24,700	
September 16	at New Mexico State*	Aggie Memorial Stadium; Las Cruces, NM (rivalry)	L 32–35	30,193	
September 23	San Diego State	Sun Bowl; El Paso, TX	W 31–24	14,100	
September 30	at Arizona State*	Sun Devil Stadium; Tempe, AZ	L 0–27	69,497	
October 7	at Colorado State	Hughes Stadium; Fort Collins, CO	L 29–39	24,173	
October 21	at BYU	Cougar Stadium; Provo, UT	L 0–44	23,335	
October 28	New Mexico^{†}	Sun Bowl; El Paso, TX	L 0–21	18,650	
November 4	at Hawaii*	Aloha Stadium; Halawa, HI	L 13–35	27,240	
November 11	Utah	Sun Bowl; El Paso, TX	L 0–38	12,300	
November 18	at UNLV*	Las Vegas Silver Bowl; Whitney, NV	L 0–27	15,610	
November 25	Wyoming	Sun Bowl; El Paso, TX	L 21–51	17,400	
*Non-conference game; ^{†}Homecoming
