= Randy Gomez =

American baseball player (born 1957)

- Catcher
- Born: February 4, 1957 (age 69); San Mateo, California, U.S.
- Batted: Right Threw: Right

MLB debut
- August 21, 1984, for the San Francisco Giants

Last MLB appearance
- September 30, 1984, for the San Francisco Giants

MLB statistics
- Batting average: .167
- Home runs: 0
- Runs batted in: 0
- Stats at Baseball Reference

Teams
- San Francisco Giants (1984)

Randell Scott Gomez (born February 4, 1957) is an American former Major League Baseball catcher. He played in 14 games for the San Francisco Giants during the 1984 season.
