= 1994 New Mexico Lobos football team =

American college football season

1994 New Mexico Lobos football
- Conference: Western Athletic Conference
- Record: 5–7 (4–4 WAC)
- Head coach: Dennis Franchione (3rd season)
- Offensive coordinator: Dennis Darnell (1st season)
- Offensive scheme: Multiple
- Defensive coordinator: Fred Bleil (3rd season)
- Base defense: 4–3
- Home stadium: University Stadium

1994 Western Athletic Conference football standings
	Conf.					Overall
Team	W		L		T	W		L		T
No. 16 Colorado State $	7	–	1	–	0	10	–	2	–	0
No. 10 Utah	6	–	2	–	0	10	–	2	–	0
No. 18 BYU	6	–	2	–	0	10	–	3	–	0
Air Force	6	–	2	–	0	8	–	4	–	0
Wyoming	4	–	4	–	0	6	–	6	–	0
New Mexico	4	–	4	–	0	5	–	7	–	0
Fresno State	3	–	4	–	1	5	–	7	–	1
San Diego State	2	–	6	–	0	4	–	7	–	0
UTEP	1	–	6	–	1	3	–	7	–	1
Hawaii	0	–	8	–	0	3	–	8	–	1
$ – Conference champion; Rankings from AP Poll

The 1994 New Mexico Lobos football team was an American football team that represented the University of New Mexico in the Western Athletic Conference (WAC) during the 1994 NCAA Division I-A football season. In their third season under head coach Dennis Franchione, the Lobos compiled a 5–7 record (4–4 against WAC opponents) and outscored opponents by a total of 401 to 386.

The team's statistical leaders included Stoney Case with 3,117 passing yards, Eric Young with 732 rushing yards, Gavin Pearlman with 866 receiving yards, and kicker Nathan Vail with 75 points scored.

== Schedule ==
Date	Opponent	Site	Result	Attendance	Source
September 3	at Texas Tech*	University Stadium; Albuquerque, NM	L 31–37	27,234	
September 10	TCU*	University Stadium; Albuquerque, NM	L 29–44		
September 17	at SMU*	Ownby Stadium; University Park, TX	L 31–34	11,100	
September 24	at BYU	Cougar Stadium; Provo, UT	L 47–49		
October 1	No. 24 Colorado State	University Stadium; Albuquerque, NM	L 31–38	29,236	
October 8	at Hawaii	Aloha Stadium; Halawa, HI	W 38–21	37,061	
October 15	San Diego State	University Stadium; Albuquerque, NM	L 13–20	26,831	
October 22	at New Mexico State*	(rivalry)	W 56–31		
October 29	at Fresno State	Bulldog Stadium; Fresno, CA	W 49–32	33,641	
November 5	No. 9 Utah^{†}	University Stadium; Albuquerque, NM	W 23–21	30,743	
November 12	at Wyoming		L 28–38		
November 19	UTEP	University Stadium; Albuquerque, NM	W 25–21	19,472	
*Non-conference game; ^{†}Homecoming; Rankings from AP Poll released prior to the game

== Roster ==
1994 New Mexico Lobos football team roster
Players
Coaches
Offense

Pos.	#	Name	Class
G	70	Calvin Allen	Jr
QB	25	Stoney Case	Sr
TE	88	David Sloan	Sr
RB	4	Eric Young	Sr

Defense

Pos.	#	Name	Class
CB	16	Billy Austin	Fr
DT	73	John Lisker	Sr
FS	6	Scott McGarrahan	Fr
LB	7	Todd Williams	Sr

Special teams

Pos.	#	Name	Class
P		Mike Nesbitt	Jr

Head coach

- Dennis Franchione

Coordinators/assistant coaches

Legend

- (C) Team captain
- (S) Suspended
- (I) Ineligible
- Injured
- Redshirt
