= List of Sacramento State Hornets football seasons =

The following is a list of Sacramento State Hornets football seasons for the football team that has represented California State University, Sacramento in NCAA competition.

== Seasons ==
Year	Coach	Overall	Conference	Standing	Bowl/playoffs	Coaches^{#}	AP^{°}
Dave Strong (Far Western Conference) (1954–1956)
1954	Dave Strong	0–7	0–5	6th			
1955	Dave Strong	2–6	0–5	6th			
1956	Dave Strong	3–5–1	2–4	5th			
Dave Strong:		5–18–1	2–14				
John Baker (Far Western Conference) (1957–1960)
1957	John Baker	5–4	2–3	4th			
1958	John Baker	3–6	1–4	6th			
1959	John Baker	2–7	1–4	5th			
1960	John Baker	5–5	2–3	T–3rd			
John Baker:		15–22	6–14				
Ray Clemons (Far Western Conference) (1961–1975)
1961	Ray Clemons	4–5	2–3	T–4th			
1962	Ray Clemons	2–7	2–3	T–4th			
1963	Ray Clemons	6–2–1	2–2–1	4th			
1964	Ray Clemons	8–2–1	4–0–1	1st	L Camellia		
1965	Ray Clemons	3–7	1–4	5th			
1966	Ray Clemons	8–2	6–0	1st			
1967	Ray Clemons	7–3	4–2	2nd			
1968	Ray Clemons	8–3	4–2	2nd	L Pasadena		
1969	Ray Clemons	8–2	4–1	2nd			12 (Note: Rankings from AP small college poll)
1970	Ray Clemons	4–6	0–0 (Note: The Hornets were ineligible for the FWC title and their games did not count in the conference standings.)	NA			
1971	Ray Clemons	4–5–1	2–3–1	5th			
1972	Ray Clemons	2–8	1–4	T–5th			
1973	Ray Clemons	1–9	0–5	6th			
1974	Ray Clemons	2–9	2–3	T–2nd			
1975	Ray Clemons	5–5	2–3	T–3rd			
Ray Clemons:		72–75–3	36–35–3				
Glenn Brady (Far Western Conference) (1976–1977)
1976	Glenn Brady	2–8	2–3	T–3rd			
1977	Glenn Brady	0–10–1	0–4–1	6th			
Glenn Brady:		2–18–1	2–7–1				
Bob Mattos (Far Western Conference / Northern California Athletic Conference) (1978–1984)
1978	Bob Mattos	1–9	1–4	5th			
1979	Bob Mattos	4–6	2–3	T–3rd			
1980	Bob Mattos	3–7	1–4	T–5th			
1981	Bob Mattos	5–6	1–4	5th			
1982	Bob Mattos	8–3	3–2	T–2nd			
1983	Bob Mattos	5–5–1	4–1–1	2nd			
1984	Bob Mattos	6–5	5–1	2nd			
Bob Mattos (Western Football Conference) (1985–1992)
1985	Bob Mattos	8–3	4–1	2nd			19 (Note: Rankings from NCAA Division II Football Committee poll)
1986	Bob Mattos	6–4–1	5–1	1st			
1987	Bob Mattos	4–7	2–4	T–5th			
1988	Bob Mattos	10–3	4–2	T–2nd	L NCAA Division II Semifinal		10 (Note: Rankings from NCAA Division II Football Committee poll)
1989	Bob Mattos	5–4	2–3	T–5th			
1990	Bob Mattos	4–6	1–4	6th			
1991	Bob Mattos	8–2	3–2	3rd			
1992	Bob Mattos	7–3	3–2	T–2nd			11 (Note: Rankings from NCAA Division II Football Committee poll)
Bob Mattos:		84–73–2	41–38–1				
Mike Clemons (American West Conference) (1993–1994)
1993	Mike Clemons	4–6	2–2	3rd			
1994	Mike Clemons	5–5	2–1	2nd			
Mike Clemons:		9–11	4–3				
John Volek (American West Conference) (1995)
1995	John Volek	4–6–1	3–0	1st			
John Volek (Big Sky Conference) (1996–2002)
1996	John Volek	1–10	0–7	8th			
1997	John Volek	1–10	1–7	9th			
1998	John Volek	5–6	3–5	T–7th			
1999	John Volek	6–5	3–5	T–5th			
2000	John Volek	7–4	5–3	T–2nd			
2001	John Volek	2–9	1–6	T–7th			
2002	John Volek	5–7	3–4	T–4th			
John Volek:		31–57–1	19–37				
Steve Mooshagian (Big Sky Conference) (2003–2006)
2003	Steve Mooshagian	2–9	1–6	T–7th			
2004	Steve Mooshagian	3–8	2–5	T–6th			
2005	Steve Mooshagian	2–9	1–6	T–7th			
2006	Steve Mooshagian	4–7	4–4	5th			
Steve Mooshagian:		11–33	8–21				
Marshall Sperbeck (Big Sky Conference) (2007–2013)
2007	Marshall Sperbeck	3–8	3–5	T–6th			
2008	Marshall Sperbeck	6–6	3–5	T–6th			
2009	Marshall Sperbeck	5–6	4–4	T–5th			
2010	Marshall Sperbeck	6–5	5–3	T–3rd			
2011	Marshall Sperbeck	4–7	3–5	T–6th			
2012	Marshall Sperbeck	6–5	4–4	T–5th			
2013	Marshall Sperbeck	5–7	4–4	8th			
Marshall Sperbeck:		35–44	26–30				
Jody Sears (Big Sky Conference) (2014–2018)
2014	Jody Sears	7–5	4–4	7th			
2015	Jody Sears	2–9	1–7	T–12th			
2016	Jody Sears	2–9	2–6	T–9th			
2017	Jody Sears	7–4	6–2	T–3rd			
2018	Jody Sears	2–8	0–7	13th			
Jody Sears:		20–35	13–26				
Troy Taylor (Big Sky Conference) (2019–2022)
2019	Troy Taylor	9–4	7–1	13th	L NCAA Division I Second Round	9	9
2020–21	No team—COVID-19						
2021	Troy Taylor	9–3	8–0	1st	L NCAA Division I Second Round	11	10
2022	Troy Taylor	12–1	8–0	T–1st	L NCAA Division I Quarterfinal	4	5
Troy Taylor:		30–8	23–1				
Andy Thompson (Big Sky Conference) (2023–2024)
2023	Andy Thompson	8–5	4–4	T–6th	L NCAA Division I Second Round	15	13
2024	Andy Thompson	3–9	1–7	T–11th			
Andy Thompson:		11–14	1–7				
Brennan Marion (Big Sky Conference) (2025)
2025	Brennan Marion	7–5	5–3	T–4th			
Brennan Marion:		7–5	5–3				
Alonzo Carter (Mid-American Conference) (2026–present)
2026	Alonzo Carter	0–0	0–0				
Alonzo Carter:		0–0	0–0				
Total:		330–414–8 (.444)					
National championship Conference title Conference division title or championship game berth
^{#}Rankings from final Coaches Poll.; ^{°}Rankings from final AP Poll.
