= 1994 Sonoma State Cossacks football team =

American college football season

1994 Sonoma State Cossacks football

NCAC co-champion
- Conference: Northern California Athletic Conference
- Record: 3–7 (2–1 NCAC)
- Head coach: Frank Scalercio (2nd season)
- Home stadium: Cossacks Stadium

1994 Northern California Athletic Conference football standings
	Conf.					Overall
Team	W		L		T	W		L		T
Humboldt State +	2	–	1	–	0	8	–	2	–	0
Chico State +	2	–	1	–	0	3	–	6	–	0
Sonoma State +	2	–	1	–	0	3	–	7	–	0
San Francisco State	0	–	3	–	0	1	–	8	–	0
+ – Conference co-champions; The second Chico State vs. Sonoma State game did not count in conference standings.

The 1994 Sonoma State Cossacks football team represented Sonoma State University as a member of the Northern California Athletic Conference (NCAC) during the 1994 NCAA Division II football season. Led by second-year head coach Frank Scalercio, Sonoma State compiled an overall record of 3–7 with a 2–1 record in conference play. They shared the NCAC title with Chico State and Humboldt State. The team was outscored by its opponents 193 to 202. The Cossacks played home games at Cossacks Stadium (Note: Cossacks Stadium was renamed in 2002 to Seawolf Stadium when the University changed the name of the mascot to Seawolves.) in Rohnert Park, California.

== Schedule ==
Date	Opponent	Site	Result	Attendance	Source
September 3	at No. 5 (I-AA) Montana*	Washington–Grizzly Stadium; Missoula, MT	L 7–41	11,266	
September 10	Chico State	Cossacks Stadium; Rohnert Park, CA	W 30–23	1,137	
September 17	at Saint Mary's*	Saint Mary's Stadium; Moraga, CA	L 21–45	1,505	
September 24	at Cal Poly*	Mustang Stadium; San Luis Obispo, CA	L 30–64	4,078	
October 1	at Southwest Texas State*	Bobcat Stadium; San Marcos, TX	L 7–57	6,146	
October 8	Cal State Northridge*	Cossacks Stadium; Rohnert Park, CA	L 14–40	936	
October 15	San Francisco State	Cossacks Stadium; Rohnert Park, CA	W 28–14	1,689	
October 22	at No. 17 UC Davis*	Toomey Field; Davis, CA	L 13–43	6,400	
November 5	Humboldt State	Cossacks Stadium; Rohnert Park, CA	L 29–31	426	
November 12	at Chico State*	University Stadium; Chico, CA	W 23–14	1,235–1,300	
*Non-conference game; Rankings from NCAA Division II Football Committee Poll released prior to the game
