= 1994 Northwestern State Demons football team =

American college football season

1994 Northwestern State Demons football
- Conference: Southland Conference
- Record: 5–6 (3–3 SLC)
- Head coach: Sam Goodwin (12th season)
- Home stadium: Harry Turpin Stadium

1994 Southland Conference football standings
	Conf.					Overall
Team	W		L		T	W		L		T
No. 18 North Texas $^	5	–	0	–	1	7	–	4	–	1
No. 5 McNeese State ^	5	–	1	–	0	10	–	3	–	0
No. 21 Stephen F. Austin	4	–	1	–	1	6	–	3	–	2
Northwestern State	3	–	3	–	0	5	–	6	–	0
Sam Houston State	1	–	5	–	0	6	–	5	–	0
Nicholls State	1	–	5	–	0	5	–	6	–	0
Southwest Texas State	1	–	5	–	0	4	–	7	–	0
$ – Conference champion; ^ – NCAA Division I-AA playoff participant; Rankings from The Sports Network poll

The 1994 Northwestern State Demons football team was an American football team that represented Northwestern State University as a member of the Southland Conference during the 1994 NCAA Division I-AA football season. In their 12th year under head coach Sam Goodwin, the team compiled an overall record of 5–6, with a mark of 3–3 in conference play, and finished fourth in the Southland.

== Schedule ==
Date	Opponent	Site	Result	Attendance	Source
September 3	No. 20 Southern*	Harry Turpin Stadium; Natchitoches, LA	L 0–20	15,600	
September 10	Delta State*	Harry Turpin Stadium; Natchitoches, LA	W 15–12		
September 17	at Nicholls State	John L. Guidry Stadium; Thibodaux, LA (rivalry)	W 35–3		
September 24	No. 18 (D-II) East Texas State*	Harry Turpin Stadium; Natchitoches, LA	L 24–28	9,600	
October 1	No. 4 Troy State*	Harry Turpin Stadium; Natchitoches, LA	W 24–20		
October 15	No. 25 Sam Houston State	Harry Turpin Stadium; Natchitoches, LA	W 54–0		
October 22	No. 15 North Texas	Harry Turpin Stadium; Natchitoches, LA	L 25–28		
October 29	at Southwest Texas State	Bobcat Stadium; San Marcos, TX	W 41–17		
November 5	at Louisiana Tech*	Joe Aillet Stadium; Ruston, LA (rivalry)	L 28–38	16,020	
November 12	No. 11 McNeese State	Harry Turpin Stadium; Natchitoches, LA (rivalry)	L 7–28	10,300	
November 19	at No. 21 Stephen F. Austin	Homer Bryce Stadium; Nacogdoches, TX (rivalry)	L 13–34		
*Non-conference game; Rankings from The Sports Network Poll released prior to the game
