= 1994 Southwest Texas State Bobcats football team =

American college football season

1994 Southwest Texas State Bobcats football
- Conference: Southland Conference
- Record: 4–7 (1–5 SLC)
- Head coach: Jim Bob Helduser (3rd season)
- Home stadium: Bobcat Stadium

1994 Southland Conference football standings
	Conf.					Overall
Team	W		L		T	W		L		T
No. 18 North Texas $^	5	–	0	–	1	7	–	4	–	1
No. 5 McNeese State ^	5	–	1	–	0	10	–	3	–	0
No. 21 Stephen F. Austin	4	–	1	–	1	6	–	3	–	2
Northwestern State	3	–	3	–	0	5	–	6	–	0
Sam Houston State	1	–	5	–	0	6	–	5	–	0
Nicholls State	1	–	5	–	0	5	–	6	–	0
Southwest Texas State	1	–	5	–	0	4	–	7	–	0
$ – Conference champion; ^ – NCAA Division I-AA playoff participant; Rankings from The Sports Network poll

The 1994 Southwest Texas State Bobcats football team was an American football team that represented Southwest Texas State University (now known as Texas State University) during the 1994 NCAA Division I-AA football season as a member of the Southland Conference (SLC). In their third year under head coach Jim Bob Helduser, the team compiled an overall record of 4–7 with a mark of 1–5 in conference play.

== Schedule ==
Date	Opponent	Site	Result	Attendance	Source
September 1	No. 4 (D-II) Texas A&M–Kingsville*	Bobcat Stadium; San Marcos, TX	L 14–45		
September 8	No. 3 Northern Iowa*	Bobcat Stadium; San Marcos, TX	W 20–19	7,139	
September 17	at Pacific (CA)*	Stagg Memorial Stadium; Stockton, CA	L 7–27	7,505	
September 24	Cal State Northridge*	Bobcat Stadium; San Marcos, TX	W 28–23	8,916	
October 1	Sonoma State*	Bobcat Stadium; San Marcos, TX	W 57–7	6,146	
October 8	North Texas	Bobcat Stadium; San Marcos, TX	L 14–27		
October 22	Nicholls State	Bobcat Stadium; San Marcos, TX (rivalry)	W 27–26		
October 29	Northwestern State	Bobcat Stadium; San Marcos, TX	L 17–41		
November 5	at No. 11 McNeese State	Cowboy Stadium; Lake Charles, LA	L 10–34		
November 12	No. 22 Stephen F. Austin	Bobcat Stadium; San Marcos, TX	L 19–24		
November 19	at Sam Houston State	Bowers Stadium; Huntsville, TX (rivalry)	L 10–34		
*Non-conference game; Rankings from The Sports Network Poll released prior to the game
