= 1994 Northern Iowa Panthers football team =

American college football season

1994 Northern Iowa Panthers football

Gateway champion

NCAA Division I-AA First Round, L 20–23 vs. Montana
- Conference: Gateway Football Conference

Ranking
- Sports Network: No. 11
- Record: 8–4 (6–0 Gateway)
- Head coach: Terry Allen (6th season)
- Home stadium: UNI-Dome

1994 Gateway Football Conference standings
	Conf.					Overall
Team	W		L		T	W		L		T
No. 11 Northern Iowa $^	6	–	0	–	0	8	–	4	–	0
No. 24 Western Illinois	4	–	2	–	0	8	–	3	–	0
Eastern Illinois	4	–	2	–	0	6	–	5	–	0
Illinois State	3	–	3	–	0	5	–	5	–	1
Indiana State	2	–	4	–	0	5	–	6	–	0
Southwest Missouri State	2	–	4	–	0	4	–	7	–	0
Southern Illinois	0	–	6	–	0	1	–	10	–	0
$ – Conference champion; ^ – NCAA Division I-AA playoff participant; Rankings from The Sports Network poll

The 1994 Northern Iowa Panthers football team was an American football team that represented the University of Northern Iowa as a member of the Gateway Football Conference (Gateway Conference) during the 1994 NCAA Division I-AA football season. In its sixth year under head coach Terry Allen, the team compiled an 8–4 record (6–0 in conference games), outscored opponents by a total of 271 to 204, and won the Gateway Conference championship for the fifth consecutive year. Northern Iowa advanced to the NCAA Division I-AA Football Championship playoffs, where they lost in the first round to Montana. Terry Allen was selected as the Gateway Conference coach of the year.

Linebacker Andre Allen had 10 sacks, was selected for the second consecutive year as the Gatweay Conference defensive player of the year, and received first-team All-America honors from the Associated Press and American Football Coaches Association. Nine Northern Iowa players were honored as first-team players on the 1994 all-Gateway football team: Allen; offensive lineman Dan Bower; defensive backs Myron Glass and Jason McCleary; tight end Matt Harken; nose tackle Brian Moretz; center D.J. Dumma; placekicker Matt Waller; and flanker Dedric Ward. Five others were named to the second team. Ward tallied 1,083 receiving yards on 60 receptions.

The team played its home games at the UNI-Dome in Cedar Falls, Iowa.

== Schedule ==
Date	Opponent	Rank	Site	Result	Attendance	Source
September 3	at Iowa State*	No. 8	Cyclone Stadium; Ames, IA	W 28–14	40,295	
September 8	at Southwest Texas State*	No. 3	Bobcat Stadium; San Marcos, TX	L 19–20	7,139	
September 17	Southwest Missouri State	No. 9	UNI-Dome; Cedar Falls, IA	W 12–7	13,294	
September 24	No. 2 McNeese State*	No. 9	UNI-Dome; Cedar Falls, IA	L 24–34	16,324	
October 1	at Indiana State	No. 13	Memorial Stadium; Terre Haute, IN	W 11–10	3,972	
October 8	at Eastern Illinois	No. 11	O'Brien Stadium; Charleston, IL	W 19–7	3,371	
October 22	Illinois State	No. 8	UNI-Dome; Cedar Falls, IA	W 24–17	16,324	
October 29	Western Illinois	No. 7	UNI-Dome; Cedar Falls, IA	W 36–27	15,382	
November 5	at No. 6 Idaho*	No. 8	Kibbie Dome; Moscow, ID	L 12–21	10,200	
November 12	at Southern Illinois	No. 14	McAndrew Stadium; Carbondale, IL	W 39–7	3,100	
November 19	Eastern Washington*	No. 14	UNI-Dome; Cedar Falls, IA	W 27–17	12,353	
November 26	at No. 8 Montana*	No. 11	Washington–Grizzly Stadium; Missoula, MT (NCAA Division I-AA First Round)	L 20–23	7,958	
*Non-conference game; Rankings from The Sports Network Poll released prior to the game
