= 1994 Nicholls State Colonels football team =

American college football season

1994 Nicholls State Colonels football
- Conference: Southland Conference
- Record: 5–6 (1–5 Southland)
- Head coach: Rick Rhoades (2nd season)
- Home stadium: John L. Guidry Stadium

1994 Southland Conference football standings
	Conf.					Overall
Team	W		L		T	W		L		T
No. 18 North Texas $^	5	–	0	–	1	7	–	4	–	1
No. 5 McNeese State ^	5	–	1	–	0	10	–	3	–	0
No. 21 Stephen F. Austin	4	–	1	–	1	6	–	3	–	2
Northwestern State	3	–	3	–	0	5	–	6	–	0
Sam Houston State	1	–	5	–	0	6	–	5	–	0
Nicholls State	1	–	5	–	0	5	–	6	–	0
Southwest Texas State	1	–	5	–	0	4	–	7	–	0
$ – Conference champion; ^ – NCAA Division I-AA playoff participant; Rankings from The Sports Network poll

The 1994 Nicholls State Colonels football team represented Nicholls State University as a member of the Southland Conference during the 1994 NCAA Division I-AA football season. Led by Rick Rhoades in his second and final season as head coach, the Colonels compiled an overall record of 5–6 with mark of 1–5 in conference play, placing in a three-way tie for fifth in the Southland. Nicholls State played home games at John L. Guidry Stadium in Thibodaux, Louisiana.

== Schedule ==
Date	Opponent	Site	Result	Attendance	Source
September 3	at Connecticut*	Memorial Stadium; Storrs, CT	W 16–7	12,156	
September 10	Livingston*	John L. Guidry Stadium; Thibodaux, LA	W 77–7		
September 17	Northwestern State	John L. Guidry Stadium; Thibodaux, LA (rivalry)	L 3–35		
October 1	at Samford*	Seibert Stadium; Homewood, AL	W 24–6	5,128	
October 8	at No. 7 Troy State*	Veterans Memorial Stadium; Troy, AL	L 14–35		
October 15	No. 20 Stephen F. Austin	John L. Guidry Stadium; Thibodaux, LA	L 10–24		
October 22	at Southwest Texas State	Bobcat Stadium; San Marcos, TX (rivalry)	L 26–27		
October 29	Southern*	John L. Guidry Stadium; Thibodaux, LA	W 20–14		
November 5	at Sam Houston State	Bowers Stadium; Huntsville, TX	W 24–0		
November 12	No. 15 North Texas	John L. Guidry Stadium; Thibodaux, LA	L 17–31	3,349	
November 19	at No. 8 McNeese State	Cowboy Stadium; Lake Charles, LA	L 24–41	16,000	
*Non-conference game; Rankings from The Sports Network Poll released prior to the game
