= Mike Daly (American football) =

American football player and coach

Biographical details
- Education: Augustana (SD) (1971)

Coaching career (HC unless noted)
- 1975–1978: South Dakota State (DC)
- 1979–1983: North Dakota State (DC)
- 1984: Idaho State (DC)
- 1985–1986: Tulsa (DC)
- 1987–1989: Wisconsin (DC)
- 1990: Western Michigan (RB)
- 1991–1996: South Dakota State

Head coaching record
- Overall: 40–24

Mike Daly is an American former college football player and coach. He served as the head football coach at South Dakota State University from 1991 to 1996, compiling a record of 40–24.

== Head coaching record ==
=== College ===
Year	Team	Overall	Conference	Standing	Bowl/playoffs
South Dakota State Jackrabbits (North Central Conference) (1991–1996)
1991	South Dakota State	7–3	5–3	T–4th	
1992	South Dakota State	6–4	5–4	5th	
1993	South Dakota State	7–4	6–3	T–3rd	
1994	South Dakota State	7–4	5–4	T–5th	
1995	South Dakota State	6–5	4–5	6th	
1996	South Dakota State	7–4	6–3	T–2nd	
South Dakota State:		40–24	31–22		
Total:		40–24			
