= 1994 Jacksonville State Gamecocks football team =

American college football season

1994 Jacksonville State Gamecocks football
- Conference: Independent
- Record: 4–7
- Head coach: Bill Burgess (10th season)
- Offensive coordinator: Charles Maniscalco (10th season)
- Defensive coordinator: Roland Houston (3rd season)
- Home stadium: Paul Snow Stadium

1994 NCAA Division II independents football records
	Conf.			Overall
Team	W	L	T	W		L		T
West Texas A&M		–		9	–	2	–	0
No. 4 Portland State ^		–		9	–	3	–	0
No. 7 New Haven		–		7	–	3	–	0
Wayne State (NE)		–		7	–	3	–	0
Gannon		–		6	–	3	–	1
UC Davis		–		6	–	4	–	0
Kentucky Wesleyan		–		5	–	5	–	0
Southern Connecticut State		–		5	–	5	–	0
Springfield		–		5	–	5	–	0
Western New Mexico		–		4	–	4	–	0
Wofford		–		5	–	6	–	0
Sacred Heart		–		4	–	5	–	0
Jacksonville State		–		4	–	7	–	0
Mercyhurst		–		3	–	6	–	1
American International		–		3	–	7	–	0
Pace		–		2	–	8	–	0
Kentucky State		–		1	–	9	–	1
^ – NCAA Division II playoff participant; Rankings from NCAA Division II Football Committee poll

The 1994 Jacksonville State Gamecocks football team represented Jacksonville State University as an independent during the 1994 NCAA Division II football season. Led by tenth-year head coach Bill Burgess, the Gamecocks compiled a record of 4–7. Jacksonville State played home games at Paul Snow Stadium in Jacksonville, Alabama. This season was the program's last at the NCAA Division II level as the Gamecocks moved to NCAA Division I-AA competition in 1995.

== Schedule ==
Date	Time	Opponent	Site	Result	Attendance	Source
September 3	7:00 pm	Sam Houston State	Paul Snow Stadium; Jacksonville, AL	L 10–17	8,222	
September 10	7:00 pm	at No. 2 McNeese State	Cowboy Stadium; Lake Charles, LA	L 12–18	15,025	
September 17	1:30 pm	at UAB	Legion Field; Birmingham, AL	W 28–12	17,222	
September 24	12:30 pm	at North Carolina A&T	Aggie Stadium; Greensboro, NC	W 24–17	7,512	
October 1	2:00 pm	Knoxville	Paul Snow Stadium; Jacksonville, AL	W 48–26	8,180	
October 15	2:00 pm	No. 19 Western Kentucky	Paul Snow Stadium; Jacksonville, AL	L 20–22	12,077	
October 22	7:00 pm	at Northeast Louisiana	Malone Stadium; Monroe, LA	W 32–28	17,101	
October 29	1:30 pm	at No. 19 Middle Tennessee	Johnny "Red" Floyd Stadium; Murfreesboro, TN	L 37–45	8,000	
November 5	1:00 pm	at Western Illinois	Hanson Field; Macomb, IL	L 27–42	2,183	
November 12	2:00 pm	Central State (OH)	Paul Snow Stadium; Jacksonville, AL	L 17–18	11,988	
November 19	2:00 pm	Southwest Missouri State	Paul Snow Stadium; Jacksonville, AL	L 15–19	7,382	
Rankings from The Sports Network Poll released prior to the game; All times are in Central time
