= 1994 San Francisco State Gators football team =

American college football season

1994 San Francisco State Gators football
- Conference: Northern California Athletic Conference
- Record: 1–8 (0–3 NCAC)
- Head coach: Dick Mannini (3rd season)
- Home stadium: Cox Stadium

1994 Northern California Athletic Conference football standings
| | Conf. | | | | | Overall |
| Team | W | | L | | T | W | | L | | T |
|---|---|---|---|---|---|---|---|---|---|---|
| Humboldt State + | 2 | – | 1 | – | 0 | 8 | – | 2 | – | 0 |
| Chico State + | 2 | – | 1 | – | 0 | 3 | – | 6 | – | 0 |
| Sonoma State + | 2 | – | 1 | – | 0 | 3 | – | 7 | – | 0 |
| San Francisco State | 0 | – | 3 | – | 0 | 1 | – | 8 | – | 0 |
+ – Conference co-champions; The second Chico State vs. Sonoma State game did not count in conference standings.

The 1994 San Francisco State Gators football team represented San Francisco State University as a member of the Northern California Athletic Conference (NCAC) during the 1994 NCAA Division II football season. Led by third-year head coach Dick Mannini, San Francisco State compiled an overall record of 1–8 with a mark of 0–3 in conference play, placing last out of four teams in the NCAC. For the season the team was outscored by its opponents 286 to 212. The Gators played home games at Cox Stadium in San Francisco.

1994 was the final season for San Francisco State Gators football program. It was disbanded in early 1995 to free up funding for women's athletics at the school. San Francisco State was the third bay-area college team to drop football in three years. Two of the Gators traditional rivals, Santa Clara and Cal State Hayward had previously dropped their football programs after the 1992 and 1993 season, respectively.

== Schedule ==
| Date | Opponent | Site | Result | Attendance | Source |
|---|---|---|---|---|---|
| September 3 | at Saint Mary’s* | Saint Mary’s Stadium; Moraga, CA | L 0–24 | 1,652 | |
| September 10 | at Sacramento State* | Hornet Stadium; Sacramento, CA | L 0–30 | 3,652 | |
| September 24 | at Western New Mexico* | Altamirano Stadium; Silver City, NM | L 19–35 | 2,271 | |
| October 1 | Menlo* | Cox Stadium; San Francisco, CA | W 38–7 | 1,039 | |
| October 8 | Cal Poly* | Cox Stadium; San Francisco, CA | L 30–35 | 1,112 | |
| October 15 | at Sonoma State | Cossacks Stadium; Rohnert Park, CA | L 14–18 | 1,689 | |
| October 22 | Humboldt State | Cox Stadium; San Francisco, CA | L 6–21 | 1,569 | |
| October 29 | Chico State | Cox Stadium; San Francisco, CA | L 7–21 | 1,117 | |
| November 12 | UC Davis* | Cox Stadium; San Francisco, CA | L 13–49 | 1,492 | |
*Non-conference game
