= 1994 Humboldt State Lumberjacks football team =

American college football season

1994 Humboldt State Lumberjacks football

NCAC co-champion
- Conference: Northern California Athletic Conference
- Record: 8–2 (2–1 NCAC)
- Head coach: Fred Whitmire (4th season)
- Home stadium: Redwood Bowl

1994 Northern California Athletic Conference football standings
	Conf.					Overall
Team	W		L		T	W		L		T
Humboldt State +	2	–	1	–	0	8	–	2	–	0
Chico State +	2	–	1	–	0	3	–	6	–	0
Sonoma State +	2	–	1	–	0	3	–	7	–	0
San Francisco State	0	–	3	–	0	1	–	8	–	0
+ – Conference co-champions; The second Chico State vs. Sonoma State game did not count in conference standings.

The 1994 Humboldt State Lumberjacks football team represented Humboldt State University—now known as California State Polytechnic University, Humboldt—as a member of the Northern California Athletic Conference (NCAC) during the 1994 NCAA Division II football season. Led by fourth-year head coach Fred Whitmire, the Lumberjacks compiled an overall record of 8–2 with a mark of 2–1 in conference play, sharing the NCAC title with Chico State and Sonoma State. The team outscored its opponents 269 to 173 for the season. Humboldt State played home games at the Redwood Bowl in Arcata, California.

== Schedule ==
Date	Opponent	Site	Result	Attendance	Source
September 3	at Montana Tech*	Alumni Coliseum; Butte, MT	W 30–21		
September 10	Western Montana*	Redwood Bowl; Arcata, CA	W 21–14		
September 17	at Cal Poly*	Mustang Stadium; San Luis Obispo, CA	W 23–19		
September 24	at Azusa Pacific*	Cougar Athletic Stadium; Azusa, CA	W 33–14		
October 1	at Saint Mary's*	Saint Mary's Stadium; Moraga, CA	L 22–27		
October 15	Chico State	Redwood Bowl; Arcata, CA	L 13–15	3,567	
October 22	at San Francisco State	Cox Stadium; San Francisco, CA	W 21–6	1,569	
October 29	No. 19 UC Davis*	Redwood Bowl; Arcata, CA	W 33–21	2,100	
November 5	at Sonoma State	Cossacks Stadium (Note: Seawolf Stadium was known as Cossacks Stadium until 2002 when the University changed the mascot from Cossacks to Seawolves.); Rohnert Park, CA	W 31–29	426	
November 12	Western New Mexico*	Redwood Bowl; Arcata, CA	W 42–7		
*Non-conference game; Rankings from NCAA Division II Football Committee Poll released prior to the game
