= 1994 Cal Poly Mustangs football team =

American college football season

1994 Cal Poly Mustangs football

AWC champion
- Conference: American West Conference
- Record: 7–4 (3–0 AWC)
- Head coach: Andre Patterson (1st season)
- Home stadium: Mustang Stadium

1994 American West Conference football standings
	Conf.					Overall
Team	W		L		T	W		L		T
Cal Poly $	3	–	0	–	0	7	–	4	–	0
Sacramento State	2	–	1	–	0	5	–	5	–	0
Southern Utah	1	–	2	–	0	4	–	7	–	0
Cal State Northridge	0	–	3	–	0	3	–	7	–	0
$ – Conference champion

The 1994 Cal Poly Mustangs football team represented California Polytechnic State University, San Luis Obispo as a member of the American West Conference (AWC) during the 1994 NCAA Division I-AA football season. Led by first-year head coach Andre Patterson, Cal Poly compiled an overall record of 7–4 with a mark of 3–0 in conference play, winning the AWC, the program's first conference title at the NCAA Division I level. The team was outscored by its opponents 334 to 304 for the season. The Mustangs played home games at Mustang Stadium in San Luis Obispo, California.

== Schedule ==
Date	Opponent	Site	Result	Attendance	Source
September 10	at Eastern Washington*	Woodward Field; Cheney, WA	L 7–61		
September 17	Humboldt State*	Mustang Stadium; San Luis Obispo, CA	L 19–23		
September 24	Sonoma State*	Mustang Stadium; San Luis Obispo, CA	W 64–30	4,078	
October 1	at No. 3 Montana*	Washington–Grizzly Stadium; Missoula, MT	L 0–45	11,868	
October 8	at San Francisco State*	Cox Stadium; San Francisco, CA	W 35–30	1,112	
October 15	No. 16 (D-II) UC Davis*	Mustang Stadium; San Luis Obispo, CA (rivalry)	W 32–31	4,188	
October 22	at Cal State Northridge	North Campus Stadium; Northridge, CA	W 30–6	4,029	
October 29	Saint Mary's*	Mustang Stadium; San Luis Obispo, CA	W 34–20		
November 5	at Northern Arizona*	Walkup Skydome; Flagstaff, AZ	L 21–44	3,056	
November 12	at Sacramento State	Hornet Stadium; Sacramento, CA	W 27–23	1,980	
November 19	Southern Utah	Mustang Stadium; San Luis Obispo, CA	W 35–21	6,024	
*Non-conference game; Rankings from The Sports Network Poll released prior to the game

== Team players in the NFL ==
No Cal Poly Mustang players were selected in the 1995 NFL draft. The following finished their college career in 1994, were not drafted, but played in the NFL.

Player	Position	First NFL team
Chris Thomas	Wide receiver	1995 San Francisco 49ers
