= Gary Reho =

American football coach (born 1953)

Gary Michael Reho
Biographical details
- Born: August 17, 1953; Bridgeport, Connecticut, U.S.
- Died: July 12, 2023 (aged 69); Naugatuck, Connecticut, U.S.

Coaching career (HC unless noted)
- 1984–1989: Worcester Academy (MA)
- 1991–1996: Sacred Heart
- 1997–2002: Sacred Heart (assistant)

Head coaching record
- Overall: 19–38 (college); 41–11 (high school)

Gary M. Reho (August 17, 1953 – July 12, 2023) is an American former college football coach. He was the first head coach in Sacred Heart University history. Reho served from 1991 through 1996 and compiled an overall record of 19–38. During his tenure, Reho oversaw the Pioneers transition from NCAA Division III, in 1991 and 1992, to NCAA Division II in 1993. While the first four years of Pioneers football were independent of any athletics conference, during the final two year of Reho's tenure the team competed in the Eastern Collegiate Football Conference.

== Head coaching record ==
=== College ===
| Year | Team | Overall | Conference | Standing | Bowl/playoffs |
|---|---|---|---|---|---|
Sacred Heart Pioneers (NCAA Division III independent) (1991–1992)
| 1991 | Sacred Heart | 5–4 | | | |
| 1992 | Sacred Heart | 0–9 | | | |
Sacred Heart Pioneers (NCAA Division II independent) (1993–1994)
| 1993 | Sacred Heart | 3–7 | | | |
| 1994 | Sacred Heart | 4–5 | | | |
Sacred Heart Pioneers (Eastern Collegiate Football Conference) (1995–1996)
| 1995 | Sacred Heart | 3–7 | 2–4 | 6th | |
| 1996 | Sacred Heart | 4–6 | 4–3 | 4th | |
| Sacred Heart: | | 19–36 | 6–7 | | |
| Total: | | 19–38 | | | |
