= 1994 Stephen F. Austin Lumberjacks football team =

American college football season

1994 Stephen F. Austin Lumberjacks football
- Conference: Southland Conference

Ranking
- Sports Network: No. 21
- Record: 6–3–2 (4–1–1 SLC)
- Head coach: John Pearce (3rd season)
- Home stadium: Homer Bryce Stadium

1994 Southland Conference football standings
	Conf.					Overall
Team	W		L		T	W		L		T
No. 18 North Texas $^	5	–	0	–	1	7	–	4	–	1
No. 5 McNeese State ^	5	–	1	–	0	10	–	3	–	0
No. 21 Stephen F. Austin	4	–	1	–	1	6	–	3	–	2
Northwestern State	3	–	3	–	0	5	–	6	–	0
Sam Houston State	1	–	5	–	0	6	–	5	–	0
Nicholls State	1	–	5	–	0	5	–	6	–	0
Southwest Texas State	1	–	5	–	0	4	–	7	–	0
$ – Conference champion; ^ – NCAA Division I-AA playoff participant; Rankings from The Sports Network poll

The 1994 Stephen F. Austin Lumberjacks football team was an American football team that represented Stephen F. Austin State University as a member of the Southland Conference during the 1994 NCAA Division I-AA football season. In their third year under head coach John Pearce, the team compiled an overall record of 6–3–2, with a mark of 4–1–1 in conference play, and finished third in the Southland.

== Schedule ==
Date	Opponent	Rank	Site	Result	Attendance	Source
September 1	at No. 2 Youngstown State*	No. 15	Stambaugh Stadium; Youngstown, OH	T 10–10	17,200	
September 10	at No. 24 Montana State*	No. 11	Reno H. Sales Stadium; Bozeman, MT	L 18–21		
September 17	Sacramento State*	No. 16	Homer Bryce Stadium; Nacogdoches, TX	W 40–15	12,004	
September 24	at No. 7 Idaho*	No. 15	Kibbie Dome; Moscow, ID	L 26–58	10,200	
October 8	No. 18 Sam Houston State	No. 24	Homer Bryce Stadium; Nacogdoches, TX (rivalry)	W 6–42	7,518	
October 15	at Nicholls State	No. 20	John L. Guidry Stadium; Thibodaux, LA	W 24–10		
October 22	Henderson State*	No. 18	Homer Bryce Stadium; Nacogdoches, TX	W 51–0		
October 29	at No. 11 McNeese State	No. 16	Cowboy Stadium; Lake Charles, LA	L 9–13	17,000	
November 5	No. 12 North Texas	No. 22	Homer Bryce Stadium; Nacogdoches, TX	T 33–33	10,141	
November 12	at Southwest Texas State	No. 22	Bobcat Stadium; San Marcos, TX	W 24–19		
November 19	Northwestern State	No. 21	Homer Bryce Stadium; Nacogdoches, TX (rivalry)	W 34–13		
*Non-conference game; Rankings from The Sports Network Poll released prior to the game
