= 1994 Sacred Heart Pioneers football team =

American college football season

1994 Sacred Heart Pioneers football
- Conference: Independent
- Record: 4–5
- Head coach: Gary Reho (3rd season)
- Home stadium: Campus Field

1994 NCAA Division II independents football records
| | Conf. | | | Overall |
| Team | W | L | T | W | | L | | T |
|---|---|---|---|---|---|---|---|---|
| West Texas A&M | | – | | 9 | – | 2 | – | 0 |
| No. 4 Portland State ^ | | – | | 9 | – | 3 | – | 0 |
| No. 7 New Haven | | – | | 7 | – | 3 | – | 0 |
| Wayne State (NE) | | – | | 7 | – | 3 | – | 0 |
| Gannon | | – | | 6 | – | 3 | – | 1 |
| UC Davis | | – | | 6 | – | 4 | – | 0 |
| Kentucky Wesleyan | | – | | 5 | – | 5 | – | 0 |
| Southern Connecticut State | | – | | 5 | – | 5 | – | 0 |
| Springfield | | – | | 5 | – | 5 | – | 0 |
| Western New Mexico | | – | | 4 | – | 4 | – | 0 |
| Wofford | | – | | 5 | – | 6 | – | 0 |
| Sacred Heart | | – | | 4 | – | 5 | – | 0 |
| Jacksonville State | | – | | 4 | – | 7 | – | 0 |
| Mercyhurst | | – | | 3 | – | 6 | – | 1 |
| American International | | – | | 3 | – | 7 | – | 0 |
| Pace | | – | | 2 | – | 8 | – | 0 |
| Kentucky State | | – | | 1 | – | 9 | – | 1 |
^ – NCAA Division II playoff participant; Rankings from NCAA Division II Football Committee poll

The 1994 Sacred Heart Pioneers football team represented Sacred Heart University as an independent during the 1994 NCAA Division II football season. Led by third-year head coach Gary Reho the Pioneers compiled a record of 4–5. Sacred Heart played home games at Campus Field in Fairfield, Connecticut.

== Schedule ==
| Date | Opponent | Site | Result | Attendance | Source |
|---|---|---|---|---|---|
| September 10 | St. John's | Campus Field; Fairfield, CT | L 3–6 | | |
| September 17 | at Saint Francis (PA) | DeGol Field; Loretto, PA | W 22–13 | 675 | |
| September 24 | UMass Lowell | Campus Field; Fairfield, CT | W 23–0 | | |
| October 1 | at Stony Brook | Seawolves Field; Stony Brook, NY | L 6–22 | 750 | |
| October 8 | Bentley | Campus Field; Fairfield, CT | L 6–32 | 825 | |
| October 15 | at Assumption | Multi-Sport Stadium; Worcester, MA | W 43–20 | 1,643 | |
| October 22 | Stonehill | Campus Field; Fairfield, CT | L 12–14 | 1,956 | |
| October 29 | Monmouth | Campus Field; Fairfield, CT | L 13–32 | 624 | |
| November 12 | at Pace | Pleasantville, NY | W 20–6 | 750 | |
