= 1994 Cal State Northridge Matadors football team =

American college football season

1994 Cal State Northridge Matadors football
- Conference: American West Conference
- Record: 3–7 (0–3 AWC)
- Head coach: Bob Burt (9th season)
- Defensive coordinator: Mark Banker (12th season)
- Home stadium: North Campus Stadium

1994 American West Conference football standings
| | Conf. | | | | | Overall |
| Team | W | | L | | T | W | | L | | T |
|---|---|---|---|---|---|---|---|---|---|---|
| Cal Poly $ | 3 | – | 0 | – | 0 | 7 | – | 4 | – | 0 |
| Sacramento State | 2 | – | 1 | – | 0 | 5 | – | 5 | – | 0 |
| Southern Utah | 1 | – | 2 | – | 0 | 4 | – | 7 | – | 0 |
| Cal State Northridge | 0 | – | 3 | – | 0 | 3 | – | 7 | – | 0 |
$ – Conference champion

The 1994 Cal State Northridge Matadors football team represented California State University, Northridge as a member of the American West Conference (AWC) during the 1994 NCAA Division I-AA football season. Led by Bob Burt in his ninth and final season as head coach, Cal State Northridge compiled an overall record of 3–7 with a mark of 0–3 in conference play, placing last out of four teams in the AWC. The team was outscored by its opponents 290 to 246 for the season. The Matadors played home games at North Campus Stadium in Northridge, California.

== Schedule ==
| Date | Opponent | Site | Result | Attendance | Source |
|---|---|---|---|---|---|
| September 10 | at Boise State* | Bronco Stadium; Boise, ID | L 19–40 | 19,489 | |
| September 17 | UC Davis* | North Campus Stadium; Northridge, CA | W 52–13 | 4,518 | |
| September 24 | at Southwest Texas State* | Bobcat Stadium; San Marcos, TX | L 23–28 | 8,916 | |
| October 1 | Chico State* | North Campus Stadium; Northridge, CA | W 47–17 | 2,509 | |
| October 8 | at Sonoma State* | Cossacks Stadium; Rohnert Park, CA | W 40–14 | 936 | |
| October 15 | at Saint Mary's* | Saint Mary's Stadium; Moraga, CA | L 10–20 | 3,070 | |
| October 22 | Cal Poly^{†} | North Campus Stadium; Northridge, CA | L 6–30 | 4,029 | |
| November 5 | at Southern Utah | Coliseum of Southern Utah; Cedar City, UT | L 20–45 | 4,012 | |
| November 12 | Northern Arizona* | North Campus Stadium; Northridge, CA | L 7–60 | 2,018 | |
| November 19 | at Sacramento State | Hornet Stadium; Sacramento, CA | L 22–23 | 1,628 | |
*Non-conference game; ^{†}Homecoming
