= 1994 North Texas Mean Green football team =

American college football season

1994 North Texas Mean Green football

Southland champion

NCAA Division I-AA First Round, L 20–24 vs. Boise State
- Conference: Southland Conference

Ranking
- Sports Network: No. 18
- Record: 7–4–1 (5–0–1 Southland)
- Head coach: Matt Simon (1st season)
- Offensive coordinator: Steve Kragthorpe (1st season)
- Defensive coordinator: James Bell (1st season)
- Home stadium: Fouts Field

1994 Southland Conference football standings
	Conf.					Overall
Team	W		L		T	W		L		T
No. 18 North Texas $^	5	–	0	–	1	7	–	4	–	1
No. 5 McNeese State ^	5	–	1	–	0	10	–	3	–	0
No. 21 Stephen F. Austin	4	–	1	–	1	6	–	3	–	2
Northwestern State	3	–	3	–	0	5	–	6	–	0
Sam Houston State	1	–	5	–	0	6	–	5	–	0
Nicholls State	1	–	5	–	0	5	–	6	–	0
Southwest Texas State	1	–	5	–	0	4	–	7	–	0
$ – Conference champion; ^ – NCAA Division I-AA playoff participant; Rankings from The Sports Network poll

The 1994 North Texas Mean Green football team was an American football team that represented the University of North Texas during the 1994 NCAA Division I-AA football season as a member of the Southland Conference. In their first year under head coach Matt Simon, the team compiled a 7–4–1 record and finished as Southland champion.

== Schedule ==
Date	Opponent	Rank	Site	Result	Attendance	Source
September 1	Abilene Christian*		Fouts Field; Denton, TX	W 48–0		
September 10	at Southwest Missouri State*		Plaster Sports Complex; Springfield, MO	W 26–20	14,220	
September 24	No. 3 Montana*		Fouts Field; Denton, TX	L 17–21	20,354	
October 1	at Oklahoma State*		Lewis Field; Stillwater, OK	L 34–36	31,107	
October 8	at Southwest Texas State		Bobcat Stadium; San Marcos, TX	W 27–14		
October 15	No. 5 McNeese State^{†}	No. 24	Fouts Field; Denton, TX	W 38–17		
October 22	at Northwestern State	No. 15	Harry Turpin Stadium; Natchitoches, LA	W 28–25		
October 29	Sam Houston State	No. 12	Fouts Field; Denton, TX	W 21–16	19,041	
November 5	at No. 22 Stephen F. Austin	No. 12	Homer Bryce Stadium; Nacogdoches, TX	T 33–33	10,141	
November 12	at Nicholls State	No. 15	John L. Guidry Stadium; Thibodaux, LA	W 31–17	3,349	
November 19	at Northeast Louisiana*	No. 15	Malone Stadium; Monroe, LA	L 20–38	16,438	
November 26	at No. 3 Boise State*	No. 18	Bronco Stadium; Boise, ID (NCAA Division I-AA First Round)	L 20–24	14,706	
*Non-conference game; ^{†}Homecoming; Rankings from The Sports Network Poll released prior to the game
