= 1994 North Dakota State Bison football team =

American college football season

1994 North Dakota State Bison football

NCC co-champion

NCAA Division II Quarterfinal, L 7–14 vs. North Dakota
- Conference: North Central Conference
- Record: 9–3 (7–2 NCC)
- Head coach: Rocky Hager (8th season)
- Home stadium: Fargodome

1994 North Central Conference football standings
	Conf.					Overall
Team	W		L		T	W		L		T
No. 15 North Dakota +^	7	–	2	–	0	10	–	3	–	0
No. 12 North Dakota State +^	7	–	2	–	0	9	–	3	–	0
Mankato State	6	–	3	–	0	7	–	4	–	0
Northern Colorado	6	–	3	–	0	7	–	4	–	0
No. 19 South Dakota State	5	–	4	–	0	7	–	4	–	0
St. Cloud State	5	–	4	–	0	6	–	4	–	0
South Dakota	3	–	6	–	0	5	–	6	–	0
Augustana (SD)	3	–	6	–	0	4	–	6	–	0
Morningside	2	–	7	–	0	3	–	8	–	0
Nebraska–Omaha	1	–	8	–	0	1	–	10	–	0
+ – Conference co-champions; ^ – NCAA Division II playoff participant; Rankings from NCAA Division II Football Committee poll

The 1994 North Dakota State Bison football team was an American football team that represented North Dakota State University during the 1994 NCAA Division II football season as a member of the North Central Conference. In their eighth year under head coach Rocky Hager, the team compiled a 9–3 record and finished as NCC co-champion.

== Schedule ==
Date	Opponent	Rank	Site	Result	Attendance	Source
September 3	Angelo State*	No. 3	Fargodome; Fargo, ND	W 21–12	13,429	
September 17	at Nebraska–Omaha	No. 3	Al F. Caniglia Field; Omaha, NE	W 49–9	4,300	
September 24	at Morningside	No. 2	Elwood Olsen Stadium; Sioux City, IA	W 24–13	2,059	
October 1	Mankato State	No. 2	Fargodome; Fargo, ND	W 22–14	12,663	
October 8	South Dakota State^{†}	No. 2	Fargodome; Fargo, ND (rivalry)	W 52–39	15,297	
October 15	at South Dakota	No. 2	DakotaDome; Vermillion, SD	W 24–13	7,140	
October 22	No. 12 St. Cloud State	No. 2	Fargodome; Fargo, ND	W 35–25	14,275	
October 29	North Dakota	No. 2	Fargodome; Fargo, ND (Nickel Trophy)	L 13–34	18,760	
November 5	at Northern Colorado	No. 10	Jackson Field; Greeley, CO	L 7–29	3,166	
November 12	Augustana (SD)	No. 12	Fargodome; Fargo, ND	W 28–14	10,207	
November 19	at No. 3 Pittsburg State*	No. 12	Carnie Smith Stadium; Pittsburg, KS (NCAA Division II First Round)	W 18–12 ^{3OT}	5,000	
November 26	at No. 15 North Dakota	No. 12	Memorial Stadium; Grand Forks, ND (NCAA Division II Quarterfinal)	L 7–14	10,060	
*Non-conference game; ^{†}Homecoming; Rankings from NCAA Division II Football Committee Poll released prior to the game
