= 1994 Southern Utah Thunderbirds football team =

American college football season

1994 Southern Utah Thunderbirds football
- Conference: American West Conference
- Record: 4–7 (1–2 AWC)
- Head coach: Jack Bishop (14th season)
- Home stadium: Coliseum of Southern Utah

1994 American West Conference football standings
	Conf.					Overall
Team	W		L		T	W		L		T
Cal Poly $	3	–	0	–	0	7	–	4	–	0
Sacramento State	2	–	1	–	0	5	–	5	–	0
Southern Utah	1	–	2	–	0	4	–	7	–	0
Cal State Northridge	0	–	3	–	0	3	–	7	–	0
$ – Conference champion

The 1994 Southern Utah Thunderbirds football team was an American football team that represented Southern Utah University as a member of the American West Conference (AWC) during the 1994 NCAA Division I-AA football season. In their 14th year under head coach Jack Bishop, the team compiled an overall record of 4–7, with a mark of 1–2 in conference play, and finished third in the AWC.

== Schedule ==
Date	Opponent	Site	Result	Attendance	Source
September 3	No. 10 Idaho*	Coliseum of Southern Utah; Cedar City, UT	L 10–43		
September 10	at Northern Arizona*	Walkup Skydome; Flagstaff, AZ	L 21–59		
September 17	Western State (CO)*	Coliseum of Southern Utah; Cedar City, UT	W 41–26	6,120	
September 24	Eastern New Mexico*	Coliseum of Southern Utah; Cedar City, UT	W 24–10		
October 1	at UC Davis*	Toomey Field; Davis, CA	L 16–41	7,100	
October 22	Saint Mary's*	Coliseum of Southern Utah; Cedar City, UT	W 28–13	1,483	
October 29	Sacramento State	Coliseum of Southern Utah; Cedar City, UT	L 16–27	6,317	
November 5	Cal State Northridge	Coliseum of Southern Utah; Cedar City, UT	W 45–20	4,012	
November 12	at Portland State*	Civic Stadium; Portland, OR	L 16–48	14,016	
November 19	at Cal Poly	Mustang Stadium; San Luis Obispo, CA	L 21–35	6,024	
*Non-conference game; Rankings from The Sports Network Poll released prior to the game
