= 1994 South Dakota State Jackrabbits football team =

American college football season

1994 South Dakota State Jackrabbits football
- Conference: North Central Conference
- Record: 7–4 (5–4 NCC)
- Head coach: Mike Daly (4th season)
- Defensive coordinator: John Stiegelmeier (4th season)
- Home stadium: Coughlin–Alumni Stadium

1994 North Central Conference football standings
| | Conf. | | | | | Overall |
| Team | W | | L | | T | W | | L | | T |
|---|---|---|---|---|---|---|---|---|---|---|
| No. 15 North Dakota +^ | 7 | – | 2 | – | 0 | 10 | – | 3 | – | 0 |
| No. 12 North Dakota State +^ | 7 | – | 2 | – | 0 | 9 | – | 3 | – | 0 |
| Mankato State | 6 | – | 3 | – | 0 | 7 | – | 4 | – | 0 |
| Northern Colorado | 6 | – | 3 | – | 0 | 7 | – | 4 | – | 0 |
| No. 19 South Dakota State | 5 | – | 4 | – | 0 | 7 | – | 4 | – | 0 |
| St. Cloud State | 5 | – | 4 | – | 0 | 6 | – | 4 | – | 0 |
| South Dakota | 3 | – | 6 | – | 0 | 5 | – | 6 | – | 0 |
| Augustana (SD) | 3 | – | 6 | – | 0 | 4 | – | 6 | – | 0 |
| Morningside | 2 | – | 7 | – | 0 | 3 | – | 8 | – | 0 |
| Nebraska–Omaha | 1 | – | 8 | – | 0 | 1 | – | 10 | – | 0 |
+ – Conference co-champions; ^ – NCAA Division II playoff participant; Rankings from NCAA Division II Football Committee poll

The 1994 South Dakota State Jackrabbits football team represented South Dakota State University as a member of the North Central Conference (NCC) during the 1994 NCAA Division II football season. Led by fourth-year Mike Daly, the Jackrabbits compiled an overall record of 7–4 with a mark of 5–4 in conference play, tying for fifth place in the NCC. South Dakota State played home games at Coughlin–Alumni Stadium in Brookings, South Dakota.

== Schedule ==
| Date | Time | Opponent | Rank | Site | Result | Attendance | Source |
|---|---|---|---|---|---|---|---|
| September 3 | 1:00 p.m. | at Slippery Rock* | | Coughlin–Alumni Stadium; Brookings, SD | W 32–28 | 3,752 | |
| September 10 | 1:00 p.m. | South Dakota Mines* | | Coughlin–Alumni Stadium; Brookings, SD | W 56–6 | 6,042 | |
| September 17 | | at St. Cloud State | | St. Cloud, MN | W 37–17 | 2,732 | |
| September 24 | 1:00 p.m. | Northern Colorado | No. 16 | Coughlin–Alumni Stadium; Brookings, SD | L 13–28 | 7,211 | |
| October 1 | 1:00 p.m. | Morningside | | Coughlin–Alumni Stadium; Brookings, SD | W 56–17 | 10,327 | |
| October 8 | | at No. 2 North Dakota State | No. 18 | Fargodome; Fargo, ND (Dakota Marker) | L 39–52 | 15,297 | |
| October 15 | 7:00 p.m. | at Nebraska–Omaha | | Al F. Caniglia Field; Omaha, NE | W 20–8 | 1,200 | |
| October 22 | 1:00 p.m. | South Dakota | | Coughlin–Alumni Stadium; Brookings, SD (rivalry) | W 26–10 | 6,939 | |
| October 29 | 1:00 p.m. | at Augustana (SD) | No. 15 | Howard Wood Field; Sioux Falls, SD | W 33–15 | 3,817 | |
| November 5 | 1:00 p.m. | Mankato State | No. 16 | Coughlin–Alumni Stadium; Brookings, SD | L 17–18 | 4,037 | |
| November 12 | | at No. 15 North Dakota | No. 19 | Memorial Stadium; Grand Forks, ND | L 6–32 | 5,986 | |
*Non-conference game; Rankings from NCAA Division II Football Committee Poll released prior to the game; All times are in Central time

== Roster ==
1994 South Dakota State Jackrabbits football team roster
| Players | | | Coaches |
|---|---|---|---|
| Offense: Pos. / # / Name / Class | Defense: Pos. / # / Name / Class | Special teams: Pos. / # / Name / Class; PK / 7 / Adam Vinatieri | Head coach: Mike Daly; Coordinators/assistant coaches: John Stiegelmeier (DC); Legend: (C) Team captain; (S) Suspended; (I) Ineligible; Injured; Redshirt |
