= 1994 UC Davis Aggies football team =

American college football season

1994 UC Davis Aggies football
- Conference: Independent
- Record: 6–4
- Head coach: Bob Biggs (2nd season)
- Offensive coordinator: Mike Moroski (2nd season)
- Home stadium: Toomey Field

1994 NCAA Division II independents football records
	Conf.			Overall
Team	W	L	T	W		L		T
West Texas A&M		–		9	–	2	–	0
No. 4 Portland State ^		–		9	–	3	–	0
No. 7 New Haven		–		7	–	3	–	0
Wayne State (NE)		–		7	–	3	–	0
Gannon		–		6	–	3	–	1
UC Davis		–		6	–	4	–	0
Kentucky Wesleyan		–		5	–	5	–	0
Southern Connecticut State		–		5	–	5	–	0
Springfield		–		5	–	5	–	0
Western New Mexico		–		4	–	4	–	0
Wofford		–		5	–	6	–	0
Sacred Heart		–		4	–	5	–	0
Jacksonville State		–		4	–	7	–	0
Mercyhurst		–		3	–	6	–	1
American International		–		3	–	7	–	0
Pace		–		2	–	8	–	0
Kentucky State		–		1	–	9	–	1
^ – NCAA Division II playoff participant; Rankings from NCAA Division II Football Committee poll

The 1994 UC Davis football team represented the University of California, Davis as an independent during the 1994 NCAA Division II football season. Led by second-year head coach Bob Biggs, UC Davis compiled a record 6–4. 1994 was the 25th consecutive winning season for the Aggies. The team their opponents 280 to 214 for the season. The Aggies played home games at Toomey Field in Davis, California.

== Schedule ==
Date	Opponent	Rank	Site	Result	Attendance	Source
September 3	at Pacific (CA)	No. 11	Stagg Memorial Stadium; Stockton, CA	L 7–24	10,100	
September 17	at Cal State Northridge		North Campus Stadium; Northridge, CA	L 13–52	4,518	
September 24	Saint Mary's		Toomey Field; Davis, CA	W 13–0	6,600	
October 1	Southern Utah		Toomey Field; Davis, CA	W 41–16	7,100	
October 8	Sacramento State	No. 16	Toomey Field; Davis, CA (Causeway Classic)	W 27–24	10,843	
October 15	at Cal Poly	No. 16	Mustang Stadium; San Luis Obispo, CA (rivalry)	L 31–32	4,188	
October 22	Sonoma State	No. 17	Toomey Field; Davis, CA	W 43–13	6,400	
October 29	at Humboldt State	No. 19	Redwood Bowl; Arcata, CA	L 21–33	2,100	
November 5	Chico State		Toomey Field; Davis, CA	W 35–7	2,700	
November 12	at San Francisco State		Cox Stadium; San Francisco, CA	W 49–13	1,492	
Rankings from NCAA Division II Football Committee Poll released prior to the game
