= Mike Clemons (coach) =

American football player and coach

Biographical details
- Born: c. 1945

Playing career

Football
- 1964–1967: Sacramento State
- Positions: Linebacker, fullback

Coaching career (HC unless noted)

Football
- 1971–1975: John F. Kennedy HS (CA) (assistant)
- 1976–1977: Benicia HS (CA)
- 1978: Chico State (assistant)
- 1979–1983: Chico State (OC)
- 1984–1992: Sacramento State (DC)
- 1993–1994: Sacramento State
- 1995: Pacific (CA) (associate HC)
- 2000–2001: Elk Grove HS (CA) (co-HC)
- 2005–2008: Sacramento City

Wrestling
- 1971–1976: John F. Kennedy HS (CA)

Head coaching record
- Overall: 9–11 (college football); 20–22 (junior college football)
- Bowls: 1–1 (junior college)

Accomplishments and honors

Championships
- Football; 2 Mid-Empire Conference (2006, 2008)

Mike Clemons (born c. 1945) is an American former college football coach. He served as the head football coach at his alma mater, California State University, Sacramento, from 1993 to 1994, compiling a record of 9–11. He played at Sacramento State from 1964 to 1967 on teams coached by his father, Ray Clemons, and was inducted into the school's Hall of Fame in 1981.

Clemons was hired as the head football coach at Sacramento City College in 2005.

== Head coaching record ==
=== College football ===
| Year | Team | Overall | Conference | Standing | Bowl/playoffs |
|---|---|---|---|---|---|
Sacramento State Hornets (American West Conference) (1993–1994)
| 1993 | Sacramento State | 4–6 | 2–2 | 3rd | |
| 1994 | Sacramento State | 5–5 | 2–1 | 2nd | |
| Sacramento State: | | 9–11 | 4–3 | | |
| Total: | | 9–11 | | | |

=== Junior college football ===
| Year | Team | Overall | Conference | Standing | Bowl/playoffs |
|---|---|---|---|---|---|
Sacramento City Panthers (NorCal Conference) (2005)
| 2005 | Sacramento City | 3–7 | 1–4 | 6th | |
Sacramento City Panthers (Mid-Empire Conference) (2006–2008)
| 2006 | Sacramento City | 7–4 | 4–1 | T–1st | W Capital Shrine Bowl |
| 2007 | Sacramento City | 5–5 | 3–2 | | |
| 2008 | Sacramento City | 5–6 | 3–1 | 1st | L Graffiti Bowl |
| Sacramento City: | | 20–22 | 11–9 | | |
| Total: | | 20–22 | | | |
National championship Conference title Conference division title or championship game berth
