= 1994 Sacramento State Hornets football team =

American college football season

1994 Sacramento State Hornets football
- Conference: American West Conference
- Record: 5–5 (2–1 AWC)
- Head coach: Mike Clemons (2nd season)
- Home stadium: Hornet Stadium

1994 American West Conference football standings
	Conf.					Overall
Team	W		L		T	W		L		T
Cal Poly $	3	–	0	–	0	7	–	4	–	0
Sacramento State	2	–	1	–	0	5	–	5	–	0
Southern Utah	1	–	2	–	0	4	–	7	–	0
Cal State Northridge	0	–	3	–	0	3	–	7	–	0
$ – Conference champion

The 1994 Sacramento State Hornets football team represented California State University, Sacramento as a member of the American West Conference (AWC) during the 1994 NCAA Division I-AA football season. Led by Mike Clemons in his second and final season as head coach, Sacramento State compiled an overall record of 5–5 with a mark of 2–1 in conference play, placing second in the AWC. The team outscored its opponents 255 to 214 for the season. The Hornets played home games at Hornet Stadium in Sacramento, California.

== Schedule ==
Date	Opponent	Site	Result	Attendance	Source
September 10	San Francisco State*	Hornet Stadium; Sacramento, CA	W 30–0	3,652	
September 17	at No. 16 Stephen F. Austin*	Homer Bryce Stadium; Nacogdoches, TX	L 15–40	12,004	
September 24	at Chico State*	University Stadium; Chico, CA	W 43–7	3,200	
October 1	Montana State*	Hornet Stadium; Sacramento, CA	W 30–14	3,847	
October 8	at No. 16 (D-II) UC Davis	Toomey Field; Davis, CA (Causeway Classic)	L 24–27	10,843	
October 22	at No. 6 (D-II) Portland State	Civic Stadium; Portland, OR	L 28–47	12,760	
October 29	at Southern Utah	Coliseum of Southern Utah; Cedar City, UT	W 27–16	6,317	
November 5	at Saint Mary's*	Saint Mary's Stadium; Moraga, CA	L 12–14	1,345	
November 12	Cal Poly	Hornet Stadium; Sacramento, CA	L 23–27	1,980	
November 19	Cal State Northridge	Hornet Stadium; Sacramento, CA	W 23–22	1,628	
*Non-conference game; Rankings from The Sports Network Poll released prior to the game
