= 1994 Southern Illinois Salukis football team =

American college football season

1994 Southern Illinois Salukis football
- Conference: Gateway Football Conference
- Record: 1–10 (0–6 Gateway)
- Head coach: Shawn Watson (1st season)
- Home stadium: McAndrew Stadium

1994 Gateway Football Conference standings
	Conf.					Overall
Team	W		L		T	W		L		T
No. 11 Northern Iowa $^	6	–	0	–	0	8	–	4	–	0
No. 24 Western Illinois	4	–	2	–	0	8	–	3	–	0
Eastern Illinois	4	–	2	–	0	6	–	5	–	0
Illinois State	3	–	3	–	0	5	–	5	–	1
Indiana State	2	–	4	–	0	5	–	6	–	0
Southwest Missouri State	2	–	4	–	0	4	–	7	–	0
Southern Illinois	0	–	6	–	0	1	–	10	–	0
$ – Conference champion; ^ – NCAA Division I-AA playoff participant; Rankings from The Sports Network poll

The 1994 Southern Illinois Salukis football team represented Southern Illinois University as a member of the Gateway Football Conference during the 1994 NCAA Division I-AA football season. They were led by first-year head coach Shawn Watson and played their home games at McAndrew Stadium in Carbondale, Illinois. The Salukis finished the season with a 1–10 record overall and an 0–6 record in conference play.

== Schedule ==
Date	Opponent	Site	Result	Attendance	Source
September 3	Tennessee–Martin*	McAndrew Stadium; Carbondale, IL	L 26–35	11,800	
September 10	at Ole Miss*	Vaught–Hemingway Stadium; Oxford, MS	L 3–59	25,137	
September 17	at Arkansas State*	Indian Stadium; Jonesboro, AR	L 14–41	13,587	
October 1	Western Illinois	McAndrew Stadium; Carbondale, IL	L 21–24	12,200	
October 8	Indiana State	McAndrew Stadium; Carbondale, IL	L 14–27	2,000	
October 15	Southeast Missouri State*	McAndrew Stadium; Carbondale, IL	L 14–24	13,000	
October 22	at No. 16 Western Kentucky*	L. T. Smith Stadium; Bowling Green, KY	W 10–7	11,900	
October 29	at Illinois State	Hancock Stadium; Normal, IL	L 17–38	10,118	
November 5	at Southwest Missouri State	Plaster Sports Complex; Springfield, MO	L 27–33	2,112	
November 12	No. 14 Northern Iowa	McAndrew Stadium; Carbondale, IL	L 7–39	3,100	
November 19	at Eastern Illinois	O'Brien Field; Charleston, IL	L 3–24	1,431	
*Non-conference game; Rankings from The Sports Network Poll released prior to the game
