= 1994 Eastern Illinois Panthers football team =

American college football season

1994 Eastern Illinois Panthers football
- Conference: Gateway Football Conference
- Record: 6–5 (4–2 Gateway)
- Head coach: Bob Spoo (8th season)
- Offensive coordinator: Roy Wittke (5th season)
- Home stadium: O'Brien Stadium

1994 Gateway Football Conference standings
	Conf.					Overall
Team	W		L		T	W		L		T
No. 11 Northern Iowa $^	6	–	0	–	0	8	–	4	–	0
No. 24 Western Illinois	4	–	2	–	0	8	–	3	–	0
Eastern Illinois	4	–	2	–	0	6	–	5	–	0
Illinois State	3	–	3	–	0	5	–	5	–	1
Indiana State	2	–	4	–	0	5	–	6	–	0
Southwest Missouri State	2	–	4	–	0	4	–	7	–	0
Southern Illinois	0	–	6	–	0	1	–	10	–	0
$ – Conference champion; ^ – NCAA Division I-AA playoff participant; Rankings from The Sports Network poll

The 1994 Eastern Illinois Panthers football team represented Eastern Illinois University during the 1994 NCAA Division I-AA football season. The Panthers played their home games at O'Brien Stadium in Charleston, Illinois.

== Schedule ==
Date	Opponent	Site	Result	Attendance	Source
September 1	Murray State*	O'Brien Stadium; Charleston, IL	L 15–31	5,320	
September 10	at UTEP*	Sun Bowl; El Paso, TX	L 20–22	28,229	
September 17	Lock Haven*	O'Brien Stadium; Charleston, IL	W 45–10	4,712	
September 24	at Northern Illinois*	Huskie Stadium; DeKalb, IL	L 17–49	11,464	
October 1	at Southwest Missouri State	Plaster Sports Complex; Springfield, MO	W 38–21	7,466	
October 8	No. 11 Northern Iowa	O'Brien Stadium; Charleston, IL	L 7–19	3,371	
October 22	at Western Illinois	Hanson Field; Macomb, IL	L 13–23	4,250	
October 29	Indiana State	O'Brien Stadium; Charleston, IL	W 30–21	8,734	
November 5	at Illinois State	Hancock Stadium; Normal, IL (rivalry)	W 16–13	1,517	
November 12	Western Kentucky*	O'Brien Stadium; Charleston, IL	W 28–20	1,003	
November 19	Southern Illinois	O'Brien Stadium; Charleston, IL	W 24–3	1,431	
*Non-conference game; Rankings from The Sports Network Poll released prior to the game
