= 1994 Sam Houston State Bearkats football team =

American college football season

1994 Sam Houston State Bearkats football
- Conference: Southland Conference
- Record: 6–5 (1–5 Southland)
- Head coach: Ron Randleman (13th season)
- Defensive coordinator: Mike Lucas (5th season)
- Home stadium: Bowers Stadium

1994 Southland Conference football standings
	Conf.					Overall
Team	W		L		T	W		L		T
No. 18 North Texas $^	5	–	0	–	1	7	–	4	–	1
No. 5 McNeese State ^	5	–	1	–	0	10	–	3	–	0
No. 21 Stephen F. Austin	4	–	1	–	1	6	–	3	–	2
Northwestern State	3	–	3	–	0	5	–	6	–	0
Sam Houston State	1	–	5	–	0	6	–	5	–	0
Nicholls State	1	–	5	–	0	5	–	6	–	0
Southwest Texas State	1	–	5	–	0	4	–	7	–	0
$ – Conference champion; ^ – NCAA Division I-AA playoff participant; Rankings from The Sports Network poll

The 1994 Sam Houston State Bearkats football team represented Sam Houston State University as a member of the Southland Conference during the 1994 NCAA Division I-AA football season. Led by 13th-year head coach Ron Randleman, the Bearkats compiled an overall record of 6–5 with a mark of 1–5 in conference play, and finished tied for fifth in the Southland.

== Schedule ==
Date	Opponent	Rank	Site	Result	Attendance	Source
September 3	at Jacksonville State*		Paul Snow Stadium; Jacksonville, AL	W 17–10	8,222	
September 10	Southeast Missouri State*		Bowers Stadium; Huntsville, TX	W 24–4	5,124	
September 17	Angelo State*		Bowers Stadium; Huntsville, TX	W 18–7		
September 24	No. 12 Alcorn State*		Bowers Stadium; Huntsville, TX	W 48–23	16,148	
October 1	Texas Southern*	No. 24	Bowers Stadium; Huntsville, TX	W 31–0		
October 8	at No. 24 Stephen F. Austin	No. 18	Homer Bryce Stadium; Nacogdoches, TX (Battle of the Piney Woods)	L 42–6	7,518	
October 15	at Northwestern State	No. 25	Harry Turpin Stadium; Natchitoches, LA	L 0–54		
October 22	No. 10 McNeese State		Bowers Stadium; Huntsville, TX	L 6–30		
October 29	at No. 12 North Texas		Fouts Field; Denton, TX	L 16–21	19,041	
November 5	Nicholls State		Bowers Stadium; Huntsville, TX	L 0–24		
November 19	Southwest Texas State		Bowers Stadium; Huntsville, TX (rivalry)	W 34–10		
*Non-conference game; Rankings from The Sports Network Poll released prior to the game
