= 1994 East Texas State Lions football team =

Football team

1994 East Texas State Lions football
- Conference: Lone Star Conference
- Record: 5–5 (2–3 LSC)
- Head coach: Eddie Vowell (9th season)
- Home stadium: Memorial Stadium

1994 Lone Star Conference football standings
	Conf.					Overall
Team	W		L		T	W		L		T
No. 2 Texas A&M–Kingsville $^	5	–	0	–	0	12	–	2	–	0
No. 13 Angelo State ^	4	–	1	–	0	6	–	5	–	0
Central Oklahoma	2	–	2	–	1	6	–	3	–	1
East Texas State	2	–	3	–	0	5	–	5	–	0
Eastern New Mexico	1	–	3	–	1	6	–	4	–	1
Abilene Christian	0	–	5	–	0	3	–	7	–	0
$ – Conference champion; ^ – NCAA Division II playoff participant; Rankings from NCAA Division II Football Committee poll

The 1994 East Texas State Lions football team represented East Texas State University—now known as Texas A&M University–Commerce—as a member of the Lone Star Conference (LSC) during the 1994 NCAA Division II football season. Led by ninth-year head coach Eddie Vowell, the Lions compiled an overall record of 5–5 with a mark of 2–3 in conference play, placing fourth in the LSC. The team played its home games at Memorial Stadium in Commerce, Texas.

== Schedule ==
Date	Opponent	Rank	Site	Result	Attendance	Source
September 4	at Central Arkansas*		Estes Stadium; Conway, AR	L 6–20	5,740	
September 10	Northwest Missouri State*		Memorial Stadium; Commerce, TX	W 49–13	4,517	
September 17	at Henderson State*		Memorial Stadium; Commerce, TX	W 25–13	5,700	
September 24	at Northwestern State*	No. 18	Harry Turpin Stadium; Natchitoches, LA	W 28–24	9,600	
October 1	at No. 11 Central Oklahoma	No. 13	Wantland Stadium; Edmond, OK	L 7–16	13,50	
October 8	No. 5т Texas A&M–Kingsville		Memorial Stadium; Commerce, TX (Chennault Cup)	L 0–31	3,800	
October 16	at Delta State*		McCool Stadium; Cleveland, MS	L 14–19	4,304	
October 22	Eastern New Mexico		Memorial Stadium; Commerce, TX	W 23–7	7,000	
October 29	at Abilene Christian		Shotwell Stadium; Abilene, TX	W 42–35	7,500	
November 5	No. 15 Angelo State		Memorial Stadium; Commerce, TX	L 6–14	4,000	
*Non-conference game; Rankings from NCAA Division II Football Committee Poll released prior to the game

== Postseason awards ==
=== All-Americans ===
- Chris Dolan, Punter, Third Team
- LeRance Shaw, Linebacker, Third Team
- Daryl Anderson, Wide Receiver, Honorable Mention
- Bobby Connelly, Offensive Guard, Honorable Mention
- Marcus Gates, Cornerback, Honorable Mention
- Kevin Mathis, Cornerback, Honorable Mention

=== LSC First Team ===
- Chris Dolan, Punter
- LaRance Shaw, Linebacker

=== LSC Second Team ===
- Daryl Anderson, Wide Receiver
- Bobby Connelly, Offensive Guard
- Trent Dagen, Tight End
- Jerry Epps, Defensive Tackle
- Marcus Gates, Cornerback
- Kevin Mathis, Cornerback

=== LSC Honorable Mention ===
- Chandler Evans, Quarterback
- Brian Jones, Offensive Tackle
- Michael Kelly, Running Back
- Margene Simmons, Linebacker
- Jason Smith, Running Back
- Jim Suiter, Offensive Tackle
- Carl Walker, Defensive Line
