= 1994 McNeese State Cowboys football team =

American college football season

1994 McNeese State Cowboys football

NCAA Division I-AA Quarterfinal, L 28–30 vs. Montana
- Conference: Southland Conference

Ranking
- Sports Network: No. 5
- Record: 10–3 (5–1 Southland)
- Head coach: Bobby Keasler (5th season)
- Offensive coordinator: Mike Santiago (5th season)
- Defensive coordinator: Kirby Bruchhaus (5th season)
- Home stadium: Cowboy Stadium

1994 Southland Conference football standings
	Conf.					Overall
Team	W		L		T	W		L		T
No. 18 North Texas $^	5	–	0	–	1	7	–	4	–	1
No. 5 McNeese State ^	5	–	1	–	0	10	–	3	–	0
No. 21 Stephen F. Austin	4	–	1	–	1	6	–	3	–	2
Northwestern State	3	–	3	–	0	5	–	6	–	0
Sam Houston State	1	–	5	–	0	6	–	5	–	0
Nicholls State	1	–	5	–	0	5	–	6	–	0
Southwest Texas State	1	–	5	–	0	4	–	7	–	0
$ – Conference champion; ^ – NCAA Division I-AA playoff participant; Rankings from The Sports Network poll

The 1994 McNeese State Cowboys football team was an American football team that represented McNeese State University as a member of the Southland Conference (Southland) during the 1994 NCAA Division I-AA football season. In their fifth year under head coach Bobby Keasler, the team compiled an overall record of 10–3, with a mark of 5–1 in conference play, and finished second in the Southland. The Cowboys advanced to the Division I-AA playoffs and lost to Montana in the quarterfinals.

== Schedule ==
Date	Opponent	Rank	Site	Result	Attendance	Source
September 3	No. 22 Illinois State*	No. 4	Cowboy Stadium; Lake Charles, LA	W 31–17	16,975	
September 10	Jacksonville State*	No. 2	Cowboy Stadium; Lake Charles, LA	W 18–12	15,025	
September 17	Central Arkansas*	No. 2	Cowboy Stadium; Lake Charles, LA (rivalry)	W 21–7	17,000	
September 24	at No. 9 Northern Iowa*	No. 2	UNI-Dome; Cedar Falls, IA	W 34–24	16,324	
October 1	at No. 5 Youngstown State*	No. 2	Stambaugh Stadium; Youngstown, OH	L 8–28	16,906	
October 15	at No. 24 North Texas	No. 5	Fouts Field; Denton, TX	L 17–38		
October 22	at Sam Houston State	No. 10	Bowers Stadium; Huntsville, TX	W 30–6		
October 29	No. 16 Stephen F. Austin	No. 11	Cowboy Stadium; Lake Charles, LA	W 13–9	17,000	
November 5	Southwest Texas State	No. 11	Cowboy Stadium; Lake Charles, LA	W 34–10		
November 12	at Northwestern State	No. 11	Harry Turpin Stadium; Natchitoches, LA (rivalry)	W 28–7	10,300	
November 19	Nicholls State	No. 8	Cowboy Stadium; Lake Charles, LA	W 41–24	16,000	
November 26	No. 6 Idaho*	No. 5	Cowboy Stadium; Lake Charles, LA (NCAA Division I-AA First Round)	W 38–21	16,000	
December 3	at No. 8 Montana*	No. 5	Washington–Grizzly Stadium; Missoula, MT (NCAA Division I-AA Quarterfinal)	L 28–30	8,419	
*Non-conference game; Rankings from The Sports Network Poll released prior to the game

== Roster ==
1994 McNeese State Cowboys football team roster
Players
Coaches
Offense

Pos.	#	Name	Class
QB	4	Eric Acheson	Jr
G	70	Carter	So
TE	89	Chris Fontenot	Fr
C	51	Derrick Hennigan	Fr
QB	7	Kerry Joseph	Sr
WR	81	Skeet Owens	Sr
TE	86	Michael Warren	Jr

Defense

Pos.	#	Name	Class
FS	9	Zach Bronson	So
DB		Delphfrine Lee	Fr
DE	96	Kavika Pittman	Sr
S		Jason Rollins

Special teams

Pos.	#	Name	Class

Head coach

- Bobby Keasler

Coordinators/assistant coaches

Legend

- (C) Team captain
- (S) Suspended
- (I) Ineligible
- Injured
- Redshirt
