= Ray Clemons =

American football player and coach (1921–2005)

Biographical details
- Born: April 2, 1921; Roseville, California, U.S.
- Died: December 27, 2005 (aged 84); Sacramento, California, U.S.

Playing career
- 1939–1941: Saint Mary's
- 1946: Saint Mary's
- 1947: Green Bay Packers
- Position: Guard

Coaching career (HC unless noted)
- 1956–1959: Sacramento City
- 1960: Sacramento State (line)
- 1961–1965: Sacramento State

Head coaching record
- Overall: 72–75–3 (college)
- Bowls: 0–1

Accomplishments and honors

Championships
- 1 Big Eight (CA) (1958); 2 Far Western Conference (1964, 1966)

Raymond Gordon Clemons (April 2, 1921 – December 27, 2005) was an American football player and coach. He played professionally as a guard in the National Football League (NFL) with the Green Bay Packers in 1947. Clemons served as the head football coach at California State University, Sacramento—known as Sacramento State College before 1972—from 1961 to 1975, compiling a record of 72–75–3.

== Biography ==
Clemons was born on April 2, 1921, in Roseville, California. He is the father of former Sacramento State football coach, Mike Clemons.

== Playing career ==
Clemons played with the Green Bay Packers during the 1947 NFL season. He played at college football at Saint Mary's College of California.

== Coaching career ==
Clemons was named head football coach at Sacramento City College in 1956. He moved on to Sacramento State College in 1960, serving as line coach for one season before succeeding Johnny Baker as head football coach.

== Head coaching record ==
=== College ===
Year	Team	Overall	Conference	Standing	Bowl/playoffs
Sacramento State Hornets (Far Western Conference) (1961–1975)
1961	Sacramento State	4–5	2–3	T–4th	
1962	Sacramento State	2–7	2–3	T–4th	
1963	Sacramento State	6–2–1	2–2–1	4th	
1964	Sacramento State	8–2–1	4–0–1	1st	L Camellia
1965	Sacramento State	3–7	1–4	5th	
1966	Sacramento State	8–2	6–0	1st	
1967	Sacramento State	7–3	4–2	2nd	
1968	Sacramento State	8–3	4–2	2nd	
1969	Sacramento State	8–2	4–1	2nd	
1970	Sacramento State	4–6	0–0	NA	
1971	Sacramento State	4–5–1	2–3–1	5th	
1972	Sacramento State	2–8	1–4	T–5th	
1973	Sacramento State	1–9	0–5	6th	
1974	Sacramento State	2–9	2–3	T–2nd	
1975	Sacramento State	5–5	2–3	T–3rd	
Sacramento State:		72–75–3	36–35–3		
Total:		72–75–3			
National championship Conference title Conference division title or championship game berth

=== Junior college ===
Year	Team	Overall	Conference	Standing	Bowl/playoffs
Sacramento City Panthers (Big Eight Conference) (1956–1959)
1956	Sacramento City	2–7	1–6	T–6th	
1957	Sacramento City	4–5	2–5	6th	
1958	Sacramento City	7–2	5–2	T–1st	
1959	Sacramento City	3–4	3–4	T–5th	
Sacramento City:		16–18	11–17		
Total:		16–18			
National championship Conference title Conference division title or championship game berth
