= 1994 Indiana State Sycamores football team =

American college football season

1994 Indiana State Sycamores football
- Conference: Gateway Football Conference
- Record: 5–6 (2–4 Gateway)
- Head coach: Dennis Raetz (15th season)
- Offensive coordinator: Marty Fine (1st season)
- Defensive coordinator: Tim McGuire (3rd season)
- Home stadium: Memorial Stadium

1994 Gateway Football Conference standings
	Conf.					Overall
Team	W		L		T	W		L		T
No. 11 Northern Iowa $^	6	–	0	–	0	8	–	4	–	0
No. 24 Western Illinois	4	–	2	–	0	8	–	3	–	0
Eastern Illinois	4	–	2	–	0	6	–	5	–	0
Illinois State	3	–	3	–	0	5	–	5	–	1
Indiana State	2	–	4	–	0	5	–	6	–	0
Southwest Missouri State	2	–	4	–	0	4	–	7	–	0
Southern Illinois	0	–	6	–	0	1	–	10	–	0
$ – Conference champion; ^ – NCAA Division I-AA playoff participant; Rankings from The Sports Network poll

The 1994 Indiana State Sycamores football team represented Indiana State University as a member of the Gateway Football Conference during the 1994 NCAA Division I-AA football season. Led by 15th-year coach Dennis Raetz, the Sycamores compiled an overall record of 5–6 with a mark of 2–4 in conference play, placing fifth in the Gateway.

== Schedule ==
Date	Opponent	Site	Result	Attendance	Source
September 3	at Toledo*	Glass Bowl; Toledo, OH	L 17–20		
September 10	Lock Haven*	Memorial Stadium; Terre Haute, IN	W 41–14	4,743	
September 17	West Virginia Tech*	Memorial Stadium; Terre Haute, IN	W 63–0		
September 24	Illinois State	Memorial Stadium; Terre Haute, IN	W 12–7		
October 1	No. 13 Northern Iowa	Memorial Stadium; Terre Haute, IN	L 10–11	3,972	
October 8	at Southern Illinois	McAndrew Stadium; Carbondale, IL	W 27–14	2,000	
October 15	at Western Illinois	Hanson Field; Macomb, IL	L 17–38		
October 22	Southwest Missouri State^{†}	Memorial Stadium; Terre Haute, IN	L 7–10	8,090	
October 29	at Eastern Illinois	O'Brien Stadium; Charleston, IL	L 21–30	8,734	
November 5	at Western Kentucky*	L. T. Smith Stadium; Bowling Green, KY	W 28–16	6,000	
November 19	No. 1 Youngstown State*	Memorial Stadium; Terre Haute, IN	L 3–14	3,513	
*Non-conference game; ^{†}Homecoming; Rankings from The Sports Network Poll released prior to the game
