= 1994 Chico State Wildcats football team =

American college football season

1994 Chico State Wildcats football

NCAC co-champion
- Conference: Northern California Athletic Conference
- Record: 3–6 (2–1 NCAC)
- Head coach: Gary Hauser (6th season)
- Home stadium: University Stadium

1994 Northern California Athletic Conference football standings
	Conf.					Overall
Team	W		L		T	W		L		T
Humboldt State +	2	–	1	–	0	8	–	2	–	0
Chico State +	2	–	1	–	0	3	–	6	–	0
Sonoma State +	2	–	1	–	0	3	–	7	–	0
San Francisco State	0	–	3	–	0	1	–	8	–	0
+ – Conference co-champions; The second Chico State vs. Sonoma State game did not count in conference standings.

The 1994 State Wildcats football team represented California State University, Chico as a member of the Northern California Athletic Conference (NCAC) during the 1994 NCAA Division II football season. Led by sixth-year head coach Gary Hauser, Chico State compiled an overall record of 3–6 with a mark of 2–1 in conference play, sharing the NCAC title with Humboldt State and Sonoma State. The team was outscored by its opponents 263 to 159 for the season. The Wildcats played home games at University Stadium in Chico, California.

== Schedule ==
Date	Opponent	Site	Result	Attendance	Source
September 10	at Sonoma State	Cossacks Stadium; Rohnert Park, CA	L 23–30	1,137	
September 17	at Mesa State*	Ralph Stocker Stadium; Grand Junction, CO	W 38–31	2,150	
September 24	Sacramento State*	University Stadium; Chico, CA	L 7–43	3,200	
October 1	at Cal State Northridge*	North Campus Stadium; Northridge, CA	L 17–47	2,509	
October 8	Saint Mary's*	University Stadium; Chico, CA	L 17–34	5,203	
October 15	at Humboldt State	Redwood Bowl; Arcata, CA	W 15–13	3,567	
October 29	at San Francisco State	Cox Stadium; San Francisco, CA	W 21–7	1,117	
November 5	at UC Davis*	Toomey Field; Davis, CA	L 7–35	2,700	
November 12	Sonoma State*	University Stadium; Chico, CA	L 14–23	1,235–1,300	
*Non-conference game
