= 1994 Southwest Missouri State Bears football team =

American college football season

1994 Southwest Missouri State Bears football
- Conference: Gateway Football Conference
- Record: 4–7 (2–4 GFC)
- Head coach: Jesse Branch (9th season)
- Captains: Dan Eason; Jerry Feeny
- Home stadium: Plaster Sports Complex

1994 Gateway Football Conference standings
	Conf.					Overall
Team	W		L		T	W		L		T
No. 11 Northern Iowa $^	6	–	0	–	0	8	–	4	–	0
No. 24 Western Illinois	4	–	2	–	0	8	–	3	–	0
Eastern Illinois	4	–	2	–	0	6	–	5	–	0
Illinois State	3	–	3	–	0	5	–	5	–	1
Indiana State	2	–	4	–	0	5	–	6	–	0
Southwest Missouri State	2	–	4	–	0	4	–	7	–	0
Southern Illinois	0	–	6	–	0	1	–	10	–	0
$ – Conference champion; ^ – NCAA Division I-AA playoff participant; Rankings from The Sports Network poll

The 1994 Southwest Missouri State Bears football team represented Southwest Missouri State University (now known as Missouri State University) as a member of the Gateway Football Conference (GFC) during the 1994 NCAA Division I-AA football season. Led by ninth-year head coach Del Miller, the Bears compiled an overall record of 4–7, with a mark of 2–4 in conference play, and finished tied for fifth in the GFC.

== Schedule ==
Date	Opponent	Site	Result	Attendance	Source
September 10	North Texas*	Plaster Sports Complex; Springfield, MO	L 20–26	14,220	
September 17	at No. 9 Northern Iowa	UNI-Dome; Cedar Falls, IA	L 7–12	13,294	
September 24	Western Illinois	Plaster Sports Complex; Springfield, MO	L 24–31 ^{2OT}		
October 1	Eastern Illinois	Plaster Sports Complex; Springfield, MO	L 21–38	7,466	
October 8	at Illinois State	Hancock Stadium; Normal, IL	L 14–28		
October 15	Liberty*	Plaster Sports Complex; Springfield, MO	L 19–27	9,169	
October 22	at Indiana State	Memorial Stadium; Terre Haute, IN	W 10–7	8,090	
October 29	Central State (OH)*	Plaster Sports Complex; Springfield, MO	W 22–14		
November 5	Southern Illinois	Plaster Sports Complex; Springfield, MO	W 33–27	2,112	
November 12	at Tulsa*	Skelly Stadium; Tulsa, OK	L 28–38	17,349	
November 19	at Jacksonville State*	Paul Snow Stadium; Jacksonville, AL	W 19–15	7,382	
*Non-conference game; Rankings from The Sports Network Poll released prior to the game
