= 1994 Western Illinois Leathernecks football team =

American college football season

1994 Western Illinois Leathernecks football
- Conference: Gateway Football Conference

Ranking
- Sports Network: No. 24
- Record: 8–3 (4–2 GFC)
- Head coach: Randy Ball (5th season)
- Home stadium: Hanson Field

1994 Gateway Football Conference standings
	Conf.					Overall
Team	W		L		T	W		L		T
No. 11 Northern Iowa $^	6	–	0	–	0	8	–	4	–	0
No. 24 Western Illinois	4	–	2	–	0	8	–	3	–	0
Eastern Illinois	4	–	2	–	0	6	–	5	–	0
Illinois State	3	–	3	–	0	5	–	5	–	1
Indiana State	2	–	4	–	0	5	–	6	–	0
Southwest Missouri State	2	–	4	–	0	4	–	7	–	0
Southern Illinois	0	–	6	–	0	1	–	10	–	0
$ – Conference champion; ^ – NCAA Division I-AA playoff participant; Rankings from The Sports Network poll

The 1994 Western Illinois Leathernecks football team represented Western Illinois University as a member of the Gateway Football Conference (GFC) during the 1994 NCAA Division I-AA football season. The team was led by fifth-year head coach Randy Ball and played their home games at Hanson Field in Macomb, Illinois. The Leathernecks finished the season with a 8–3 record overall and a 4–2 record in conference play.

== Schedule ==
Date	Opponent	Site	Result	Attendance	Source
September 1	Iowa Wesleyan*	Hanson Field; Macomb, IL	W 42–0		
September 8	at Western Michigan*	Waldo Stadium; Kalamazoo, MI	L 7–43	30,734	
September 17	Illinois State	Hanson Field; Macomb, IL	L 0–17	5,946	
September 24	at Southwest Missouri State	Plaster Sports Complex; Springfield, MO	W 31–24 ^{2OT}		
October 1	at Southern Illinois	McAndrew Stadium; Carbondale, IL	W 24–21	12,200	
October 15	Indiana State	Hanson Field; Macomb, IL	W 38–17		
October 22	Eastern Illinois	Hanson Field; Macomb, IL	W 23–13	4,250	
October 29	at No. 7 Northern Iowa	UNI-Dome; Cedar Falls, IA	L 27–36	15,382	
November 5	Jacksonville State*	Hanson Field; Macomb, IL	W 42–27	2,183	
November 12	Buffalo*	Hanson Field; Macomb, IL	W 49–7	3,961	
November 19	Murray State*	Hanson Field; Macomb, IL	W 73–17	3,786	
*Non-conference game; Rankings from The Sports Network Poll released prior to the game
