= 1994 Illinois State Redbirds football team =

American college football season

1994 Illinois State Redbirds football
- Conference: Gateway Football Conference
- Record: 5–5–1 (3–3 GFC)
- Head coach: Jim Heacock (7th season)
- Home stadium: Hancock Stadium

1994 Gateway Football Conference standings
	Conf.					Overall
Team	W		L		T	W		L		T
No. 11 Northern Iowa $^	6	–	0	–	0	8	–	4	–	0
No. 24 Western Illinois	4	–	2	–	0	8	–	3	–	0
Eastern Illinois	4	–	2	–	0	6	–	5	–	0
Illinois State	3	–	3	–	0	5	–	5	–	1
Indiana State	2	–	4	–	0	5	–	6	–	0
Southwest Missouri State	2	–	4	–	0	4	–	7	–	0
Southern Illinois	0	–	6	–	0	1	–	10	–	0
$ – Conference champion; ^ – NCAA Division I-AA playoff participant; Rankings from The Sports Network poll

The 1994 Illinois State Redbirds football team represented Illinois State University as a member of the Gateway Football Conference (GFC) during the 1994 NCAA Division I-AA football season. In their seventh year under head coach Jim Heacock, the Redbirds compiled an overall record of 5–5–1, with a mark of 3–3 in conference play, and finished fourth in the GFC. Illinois State played home games at Hancock Stadium in Normal, Illinois.

== Schedule ==
Date	Opponent	Rank	Site	Result	Attendance	Source
September 3	at No. 4 McNeese State*	No. 22	Cowboy Stadium; Lake Charles, LA	L 17–31	16,975	
September 10	Washburn*		Hancock Stadium; Normal, IL	W 47–16	8,819	
September 17	at Western Illinois		Hanson Field; Macomb, IL	W 17–0	5,946	
September 24	at Indiana State		Memorial Stadium; Terre Haute, IN	L 7–12		
October 1	No. 9 UCF*		Hancock Stadium; Normal, IL	L 26–27	6,550	
October 8	Southwest Missouri State		Hancock Stadium; Normal, IL	W 28–14		
October 15	at Buffalo*		University at Buffalo Stadium; Amherst, NY	W 17–7	3,295	
October 22	at No. 8 Northern Iowa		UNI-Dome; Cedar Falls, IA	L 17–24	16,324	
October 29	Southern Illinois		Hancock Stadium; Normal, IL	W 38–17	10,118	
November 5	Eastern Illinois		Hancock Stadium; Normal, IL (rivalry)	L 13–16	1,517	
November 12	at No. 17 Middle Tennessee*		Johnny "Red" Floyd Stadium; Murfreesboro, TN	T 27–27	5,000	
*Non-conference game; Rankings from The Sports Network Poll released prior to the game
