= 1994 NCAA Division II football season =

American college football season

- Regular season: September 3 – November 12, 1994
- Playoffs: November 19 – December 10, 1994
- National Championship: Braly Municipal Stadium; Florence, AL
- Champion: North Alabama
- Harlon Hill Trophy: Chris Hatcher, Valdosta State

The 1994 NCAA Division II football season, part of college football in the United States organized by the National Collegiate Athletic Association at the Division II level, began on September 3, 1994, and concluded with the NCAA Division II Football Championship on December 10, 1994, at Braly Municipal Stadium in Florence, Alabama, hosted by the University of North Alabama.

North Alabama defeated Texas A&M–Kingsville in the championship game, 16–10, to win their second consecutive Division II national title.

The Harlon Hill Trophy was awarded to Chris Hatcher, quarterback from Valdosta State.

== Conference changes and new programs ==
Team	1993 conference	1994 conference
Cal State Hayward	NCAC	Dropped program
Lees–McRae	D-II Independent	Dropped program
Michigan Tech	D-II Independent	MIFC
Nebraska-Kearney	D-II Independent	RMAC
UC Davis	American West (I-AA)	D-II Independent
Western New Mexico	NAIA Independent	D-II Independent
West Virginia State	WVIAC	NAIA Independent

== Conference standings ==
1994 Central Intercollegiate Athletic Association football standings
	Conf.					Overall
Team	W		L		T	W		L		T
Hampton $	8	–	0	–	0	10	–	1	–	0
Virginia State	6	–	2	–	0	7	–	3	–	0
Norfolk State	5	–	3	–	0	7	–	3	–	0
North Carolina Central	5	–	3	–	0	6	–	5	–	0
Winston-Salem State	5	–	3	–	0	6	–	5	–	0
Livingstone	5	–	3	–	0	5	–	5	–	0
Fayetteville State	4	–	4	–	0	4	–	5	–	1
Elizabeth City State	3	–	5	–	0	5	–	6	–	0
Bowie State	2	–	6	–	0	2	–	8	–	0
Virginia Union	1	–	7	–	0	1	–	1	–	9
Johnson C. Smith	0	–	8	–	0	0	–	10	–	0
$ – Conference champion

1994 Eastern Collegiate Football Conference standings
	Conf.					Overall
Team	W		L		T	W		L		T
Bentley $	6	–	0	–	0	11	–	0	–	0
Assumption	5	–	1	–	0	7	–	3	–	0
Stonehill	4	–	2	–	0	7	–	3	–	0
MIT	3	–	3	–	0	4	–	5	–	0
Nichols	2	–	4	–	0	2	–	7	–	0
Curry	1	–	5	–	0	1	–	7	–	1
Western New England	0	–	6	–	0	0	–	9	–	0
Salve Regina	6	–	0	–	0	8	–	1	–	0
$ – Conference champion

1994 Gulf South Conference football standings
	Conf.					Overall
Team	W		L		T	W		L		T
No. 1 North Alabama $^	7	–	0	–	0	13	–	1	–	0
No. 6 Valdosta State ^	6	–	1	–	0	11	–	2	–	0
Central Arkansas	6	–	1	–	0	8	–	2	–	0
No. 10 West Georgia	4	–	3	–	0	7	–	3	–	0
Delta State	2	–	4	–	1	3	–	5	–	2
Henderson State	1	–	5	–	1	2	–	8	–	1
Livingston	0	–	7	–	0	1	–	9	–	0
Mississippi College *	2	–	5	–	0	4	–	5	–	1
$ – Conference champion; ^ – NCAA Division II playoff participant; * – ineligible for conference championship; Rankings from NCAA Division II Football Committee poll

1994 Lone Star Conference football standings
	Conf.					Overall
Team	W		L		T	W		L		T
No. 2 Texas A&M–Kingsville $^	5	–	0	–	0	12	–	2	–	0
No. 13 Angelo State ^	4	–	1	–	0	6	–	5	–	0
Central Oklahoma	2	–	2	–	1	6	–	3	–	1
East Texas State	2	–	3	–	0	5	–	5	–	0
Eastern New Mexico	1	–	3	–	1	6	–	4	–	1
Abilene Christian	0	–	5	–	0	3	–	7	–	0
$ – Conference champion; ^ – NCAA Division II playoff participant; Rankings from NCAA Division II Football Committee poll

1994 Mid-America Intercollegiate Athletics Association football standings
	Conf.					Overall
Team	W		L		T	W		L		T
No. 3 Pittsburg State $^	9	–	0	–	0	10	–	1	–	0
No. T–8 NE Missouri State ^	7	–	2	–	0	8	–	3	–	0
Missouri Western	6	–	3	–	0	8	–	3	–	0
Central Missouri State	6	–	3	–	0	7	–	3	–	0
Missouri Southern	5	–	4	–	0	5	–	5	–	0
Missouri–Rolla	4	–	4	–	1	5	–	5	–	1
Emporia State	4	–	5	–	0	5	–	5	–	0
Washburn	2	–	7	–	0	3	–	7	–	0
Southwest Baptist	1	–	7	–	1	1	–	8	–	1
NW Missouri State	0	–	9	–	0	0	–	11	–	0
$ – Conference champion; ^ – NCAA Division II playoff participant; Rankings from NCAA Division II Football Committee poll

1994 Midwest Intercollegiate Football Conference standings
	Conf.					Overall
Team	W		L		T	W		L		T
No. 5 Ferris State $^	10	–	0	–	0	11	–	1	–	0
No. 18 Grand Valley State ^	8	–	2	–	0	8	–	4	–	0
Hillsdale	7	–	3	–	0	7	–	4	–	0
Ashland	6	–	4	–	0	6	–	4	–	0
Saginaw Valley State	6	–	4	–	0	6	–	4	–	0
Wayne State (MI)	6	–	4	–	0	6	–	5	–	0
Northern Michigan	5	–	5	–	0	5	–	5	–	0
Michigan Tech	3	–	7	–	0	4	–	7	–	0
Saint Joseph's (IN)	3	–	7	–	0	4	–	7	–	0
Indianapolis	2	–	7	–	1	2	–	7	–	1
Northwood	2	–	7	–	1	2	–	7	–	1
St. Francis (IL)	1	–	9	–	0	1	–	10	–	0
$ – Conference champion; ^ – NCAA Division II playoff participant; Rankings from NCAA Division II Football Committee poll

1994 North Central Conference football standings
	Conf.					Overall
Team	W		L		T	W		L		T
No. 15 North Dakota +^	7	–	2	–	0	10	–	3	–	0
No. 12 North Dakota State +^	7	–	2	–	0	9	–	3	–	0
Mankato State	6	–	3	–	0	7	–	4	–	0
Northern Colorado	6	–	3	–	0	7	–	4	–	0
No. 19 South Dakota State	5	–	4	–	0	7	–	4	–	0
St. Cloud State	5	–	4	–	0	6	–	4	–	0
South Dakota	3	–	6	–	0	5	–	6	–	0
Augustana (SD)	3	–	6	–	0	4	–	6	–	0
Morningside	2	–	7	–	0	3	–	8	–	0
Nebraska–Omaha	1	–	8	–	0	1	–	10	–	0
+ – Conference co-champions; ^ – NCAA Division II playoff participant; Rankings from NCAA Division II Football Committee poll

1994 Northern California Athletic Conference football standings
	Conf.					Overall
Team	W		L		T	W		L		T
Humboldt State +	2	–	1	–	0	8	–	2	–	0
Chico State +	2	–	1	–	0	3	–	6	–	0
Sonoma State +	2	–	1	–	0	3	–	7	–	0
San Francisco State	0	–	3	–	0	1	–	8	–	0
+ – Conference co-champions; The second Chico State vs. Sonoma State game did not count in conference standings.

1994 Northern Sun Intercollegiate Conference football standings
	Conf.					Overall
Team	W		L		T	W		L		T
Winona State $	5	–	0	–	1	7	–	3	–	1
No. 5 Moorhead State ^	4	–	1	–	1	7	–	3	–	1
Northern State	4	–	2	–	0	5	–	6	–	0
Southwest State (MN)	3	–	3	–	0	4	–	6	–	0
Minnesota Duluth	3	–	3	–	0	4	–	7	–	0
Bemidji State	1	–	5	–	0	1	–	8	–	0
Minnesota Morris	0	–	6	–	0	1	–	9	–	0
$ – Conference champion; ^ – NAIA Division I playoff participant; Rankings from NAIA Division I poll

1994 Pennsylvania State Athletic Conference football standings
	Conf.					Overall
Team	W		L		T	W		L		T
East Division
Bloomsburg x	5	–	1	–	0	8	–	3	–	0
West Chester x^	5	–	1	–	0	8	–	4	–	0
Millersville	4	–	2	–	0	8	–	2	–	0
Kutztown	4	–	2	–	0	5	–	5	–	0
East Stroudsburg	2	–	4	–	0	5	–	5	–	0
Mansfield	1	–	5	–	0	5	–	5	–	0
Cheyney	0	–	6	–	0	0	–	11	–	0
West Division
No. T–8 IUP x^	6	–	0	–	0	10	–	3	–	0
No. 17 Edinboro	4	–	2	–	0	7	–	3	–	0
Slippery Rock	4	–	2	–	0	6	–	4	–	0
Shippensburg	2	–	4	–	0	4	–	6	–	0
Clarion	2	–	4	–	0	4	–	6	–	0
Lock Haven	2	–	4	–	0	2	–	9	–	0
California (PA)	1	–	5	–	0	2	–	9	–	0
x – Division champion/co-champions; ^ – NCAA Division II playoff participant; Rankings from NCAA Division II Football Committee poll

1994 Rocky Mountain Athletic Conference football standings
	Conf.					Overall
Team	W		L		T	W		L		T
No. 14 Western State (CO) $^	6	–	1	–	0	8	–	3	–	0
Fort Hays State	5	–	1	–	1	5	–	5	–	1
Chadron State	5	–	2	–	0	9	–	2	–	0
Mesa State	4	–	3	–	0	4	–	7	–	0
Adams State	2	–	4	–	1	3	–	7	–	1
New Mexico Highlands	2	–	4	–	1	2	–	7	–	1
Fort Lewis	2	–	5	–	0	2	–	9	–	0
Colorado Mines	0	–	6	–	1	2	–	6	–	1
Nebraska–Kearney *	0	–	0	–	0	8	–	3	–	0
$ – Conference champion; ^ – NCAA Division II playoff participant; * – ineligible for conference title; Rankings from NCAA Division II Football Committee poll

1994 South Atlantic Conference football standings
	Conf.					Overall
Team	W		L		T	W		L		T
Lenoir–Rhyne +	6	–	1	–	0	8	–	2	–	0
No. 16 Carson–Newman +^	6	–	1	–	0	8	–	3	–	0
Mars Hill	4	–	3	–	0	7	–	4	–	0
Elon	4	–	3	–	0	5	–	5	–	0
Gardner–Webb	3	–	4	–	0	5	–	6	–	0
Presbyterian	2	–	5	–	0	5	–	6	–	0
Catawba	2	–	5	–	0	2	–	9	–	0
Wingate	1	–	6	–	0	3	–	7	–	0
+ – Conference co-champions; ^ – NCAA Division II playoff participant; Rankings from NCAA Division II Football Committee poll

1994 Southern Intercollegiate Athletic Conference football standings
	Conf.					Overall
Team	W		L		T	W		L		T
No. 11 Albany State $^	8	–	0	–	0	10	–	2	–	0
Tuskegee	6	–	2	–	0	6	–	5	–	0
Savannah State	5	–	3	–	0	8	–	3	–	0
Fort Valley State	5	–	3	–	0	5	–	5	–	0
Alabama A&M	4	–	4	–	0	4	–	7	–	0
Clark Atlanta	2	–	5	–	0	3	–	7	–	0
Miles	2	–	5	–	0	2	–	6	–	1
Morehouse	2	–	6	–	0	3	–	7	–	0
Morris Brown	1	–	7	–	0	2	–	8	–	0
$ – Conference champion; ^ – NCAA Division II playoff participant; Rankings from NCAA Division II Football Committee poll

1994 West Virginia Intercollegiate Athletic Conference football standings
	Conf.					Overall
Team	W		L		T	W		L		T
No. 2 Glenville State +^	5	–	1	–	0	8	–	3	–	0
No. 10 Shepherd +	5	–	1	–	0	6	–	4	–	0
No. 11 West Liberty State	4	–	2	–	0	7	–	3	–	0
No. 12 West Virginia Wesleyan	4	–	2	–	0	7	–	3	–	0
Fairmont State	2	–	4	–	0	3	–	7	–	0
West Virginia Tech	1	–	5	–	0	1	–	9	–	0
Concord	0	–	6	–	0	1	–	9	–	0
+ – Conference co-champions; ^ – NAIA Division I playoff participant; Rankings from NAIA Division I poll

1994 NCAA Division II independents football records
	Conf.			Overall
Team	W	L	T	W		L		T
West Texas A&M		–		9	–	2	–	0
No. 4 Portland State ^		–		9	–	3	–	0
No. 7 New Haven		–		7	–	3	–	0
Wayne State (NE)		–		7	–	3	–	0
Gannon		–		6	–	3	–	1
UC Davis		–		6	–	4	–	0
Kentucky Wesleyan		–		5	–	5	–	0
Southern Connecticut State		–		5	–	5	–	0
Springfield		–		5	–	5	–	0
Western New Mexico		–		4	–	4	–	0
Wofford		–		5	–	6	–	0
C.W. Post		–		5	–	6	–	0
Sacred Heart		–		4	–	5	–	0
Jacksonville State		–		4	–	7	–	0
Mercyhurst		–		3	–	6	–	1
American International		–		3	–	7	–	0
Pace		–		2	–	8	–	0
Kentucky State		–		1	–	9	–	1
^ – NCAA Division II playoff participant; Rankings from NCAA Division II Football Committee poll

== Conference summaries ==
Conference Champions

Central Intercollegiate Athletic Association – Hampton
Eastern Collegiate Football Conference – Bentley
Gulf South Conference – North Alabama
Lone Star Conference – Texas A&M–Kingsville
Mid-America Intercollegiate Athletics Association – Pittsburg State
Midwest Intercollegiate Football Conference – Ferris State
North Central Conference – North Dakota and North Dakota State
Northern California Athletic Conference – Cal State Chico and Humboldt State
Northern Sun Intercollegiate Conference – Winona State
Pennsylvania State Athletic Conference – Bloomsburg and West Chester (East), Edinboro and Indiana (PA) (West)
Rocky Mountain Athletic Conference – Western State (CO)
South Atlantic Conference – Carson-Newman and Lenoir-Rhyne
Southern Intercollegiate Athletic Conference – Albany State
West Virginia Intercollegiate Athletic Conference – Glenville State and Shepherd

== Postseason ==
1994 NCAA Division II Football Championship
- Teams: 16
- Finals Site: Braly Municipal Stadium; Florence, AL
- Champion: North Alabama; (2nd title, title game)
- Runner-up: Texas A&M–Kingsville; (1st title game)
- Semifinalists: IUP; North Dakota
- Winning coach: championship

The 1994 NCAA Division II Football Championship playoffs were the 22nd single-elimination tournament to determine the national champion of men's NCAA Division II college football. The championship game was held at Braly Municipal Stadium in Florence, Alabama, for the ninth time.

=== Playoff bracket ===
First round Campus sites
Ferris State	43
West Chester	40
IUP	35
Grand Valley State	27
Texas A&M–Kingsville	43
Western State (CO)	7
Portland State	29
Angelo State	0
North Dakota State	18***
Pittsburg State	12
North Dakota	18
Northeast Missouri State	6
North Alabama	17
Carson–Newman	13
Valdosta State	14
Albany State	7

Quarterfinals; Campus sites
Ferris State	17
IUP	21
Texas A&M–Kingsville	21
Portland State	16
North Dakota State	7
North Dakota	14
North Alabama	27**
Valdosta State	24

Semifinals; Campus sites
IUP	20
Texas A&M–Kingsville	46
North Dakota	7
North Alabama	35

Championship; Braly Municipal Stadium; Florence, AL
Texas A&M–Kingsville	10
North Alabama	16

== See also ==
- 1994 NCAA Division I-A football season
- 1994 NCAA Division I-AA football season
- 1994 NCAA Division III football season
- 1994 NAIA Division I football season
- 1994 NAIA Division II football season
