= Northern California Athletic Conference =

Former NCAA Division II football conference

- Formerly: Far Western Conference (1925–1982)
- Conference: NCAA
- Founded: 1925; 101 years ago
- Folded: 1998; 28 years ago
- Division: Division II
- No. of teams: 16 (total)
- Region: West Coast

The Northern California Athletic Conference (NCAC) was an NCAA Division II college athletic association that sponsored American football that was founded in 1925. It disbanded in 1998 after the majority of its member schools were forced to drop football.

== History ==
The NCAC was founded as the Far Western Conference (FWC) in 1925 by its charter member schools: Fresno State, Saint Mary's, University of California, Davis, Nevada, San Jose State and College of the Pacific.

Nevada's departure from the conference in 1940 left the conference with only four members: Chico State, Fresno State, College of the Pacific and UC Davis. The conference looked to four nominees in Humboldt State (joined in 1940), San Francisco State, Santa Barbara State College (later University of California, Santa Barbara) and California Polytechnic State University, San Luis Obispo.

Shortly after World War II, the remaining members, with the exception of UC Davis, Chico State and Humboldt State, would leave for other conferences, to be replaced over the years by San Francisco State (joined in 1946), Southern Oregon (1947), Sacramento State (1953), Hayward State (1961) and Sonoma State (1966). During the 1990s, each of the universities associated with the California State system chose to disband their football teams in order to comply with Title IX, with the exception of Humboldt State, which added two women's sports to achieve compliance, Sacramento State, and Cal Poly.

=== Chronological timeline ===

- 1925 – The Northern California Athletic Conference (NCAC) was founded as the Far Western Conference (FWC). Charter members included the Northern Branch of the College of Agriculture (later the University of California, Davis), Fresno State Normal School (later California State University, Fresno), the University of Nevada (later the University of Nevada, Reno), the University of the Pacific and Saint Mary's College of California, beginning the 1925–26 academic year.
- 1927:
  - Saint Mary's (Cal.) left the FWC after the 1926–27 academic year.
  - St. Ignatius College (later the University of San Francisco) joined the FWC in the 1927–28 academic year.
- 1928 – Chico State Teachers College (later California State University, Chico) joined the FWC in the 1928–29 academic year.
- 1929:
  - St. Ignatius (later San Francisco) left the FWC after the 1928–29 academic year.
- San Jose State Teachers College (later San Jose State University) joined the FWC in the 1929–30 academic year.
- 1935 – San Jose State left the FWC after the 1934–35 academic year.
- 1940:
  - Fresno State and Nevada left the FWC after the 1939–40 academic year.
  - Humboldt State College (later California State Polytechnic University, Humboldt) joined the FWC in the 1940–41 academic year.
- 1942 – Pacific left the FWC after the 1941–42 academic year.
- 1946 – San Francisco State College (later San Francisco State University) joined the FWC in the 1946–47 academic year.
- 1947 – Southern Oregon College (later Southern Oregon University) joined the FWC in the 19247–48 academic year.
- 1951 – San Francisco State left the FWC after the 1950–51 academic year.
- 1953:
  - Southern Oregon left the FWC after the 1952–53 academic year.
  - Sacramento State College (later California State University, Sacramento) joined the FWC (with Nevada and San Francisco State rejoining) in the 1953–54 academic year.
- 1964 – California State College, Hayward (later California State University, East Bay) joined the FWC in the 1964–65 academic year.
- 1966 – Sonoma State College (later Sonoma State University) joined the FWC in the 1966–67 academic year.
- 1969 – Nevada left the FWC for a second time after the 1968–69 academic year.
- 1974 – Sonoma State left the FWC after the 1973–74 academic year.
- 1975 – Stanislaus State College (later California State University, Stanislaus) joined the FWC in the 1975–76 academic year.
- 1982:
  - The FWC was rebranded as the Northern California Athletic Conference (NCAC), beginning the 1982–83 academic year.
  - Sonoma State joined the NCAC in the 1982–83 academic year.
- 1985 – Sacramento State left the NCAC after the 1984–85 academic year.
- 1988 – The College of Notre Dame of California (later Notre Dame de Namur University) joined the NCAC in the 1988–89 academic year.
- 1998 – The NCAC ceased operations as an athletic conference after the 1997–98 academic year; as many schools left to join their respective new home primary conferences, beginning the 1998–99 academic year:
  - Cal State Chico, Humboldt State, San Francisco State, Sonoma State, Stanislaus State and UC Davis the join the California Collegiate Athletic Association (CCAA)
  - Cal State Hayward and Notre Dame de Namur to join the California Pacific Conference (Cal Pac) of the National Association of Intercollegiate Athletics (NAIA)

== Member schools ==
=== Final members ===
Institution	Location	Founded	Affiliation	Enrollment	Nickname	Joined (Note: Represents the calendar year when fall sports competition begins.)	Left (Note: Represents the calendar year when spring sports competition ends.)	Current conference
California State University, Hayward (Note: Currently known as California State University, East Bay since 2005.) (Cal State Hayward)	Hayward, California	1957	Public (Note: Part of the California State University System.)	10,892	Pioneers	1961	1998	California (CCAA)
California State University, Chico (Note: Formerly known as Chico State College until 1972.) (Chico State)	Chico, California	1887	Public	14,581	Wildcats	1928	1998	California (CCAA)
Humboldt State University (Note: Currently known as California State Polytechnic University, Humboldt since early 2022.) (Humboldt State)	Arcata, California	1913	Public	6,045	Lumberjacks	1940	1998	California (CCAA)
College of Notre Dame (Note: Currently known as Notre Dame de Namur University since 2001.)	Belmont, California	1851	Catholic (SNDdeN)	200 (as of 2023)	Argonauts	1988	1998	N/A (Note: Notre Dame de Namur discontinued its athletics program at the end of the 2022–23 school year.)
San Francisco State University (Note: Formerly known as California State University, San Francisco until 1974.) (San Francisco State)	San Francisco, California	1899	Public	22,357	Gators	1946	1951	California (CCAA)
San Francisco State University (San Francisco State)	San Francisco, California	1899	Public	22,357	Gators	1953	1998	California (CCAA)
Sonoma State University	Rohnert Park, California	1960	Public	6,566	Cossacks (Note: Currently known as the Sonoma State Seawolves.)	1966	1974	N/A (Note: Sonoma State discontinued its athletics program at the end of the 2024–25 school year.)
Sonoma State University	Rohnert Park, California	1960	Public	6,566	Cossacks	1982	1998	N/A
California State University, Stanislaus (Stanislaus State)	Turlock, California	1957	Public	9,295	Warriors	1975	1998	California (CCAA)
University of California, Davis (UC Davis)	Davis, California	1905	Public (Note: Part of the University of California System.)	40,772	Aggies	1925	1998	Big West (BWC) (Note: Currently an NCAA Division I athletic conference.) (Mountain West (MW) in 2026)

=== Other members ===
Institution	Location	Founded	Affiliation	Enrollment	Nickname	Joined (Note: Represents the calendar year when fall sports competition begins.)	Left (Note: Represents the calendar year when spring sports competition ends.)	Current conference
Fresno State Normal School (Note: Later known as Fresno State College from 1949 to 1972; currently known as California State University, Fresno since 1972.)	Fresno, California	1911	Public (Note: Part of the California State University System.)	25,341	Bulldogs	1925	1940	Mountain West (MW) (Note: Currently an NCAA Division I athletic conference.) (Pac-12 in 2026)
University of Nevada (Note: Also known as the University of Nevada, Reno since 1969.)	Reno, Nevada	1874	Public (Note: Part of the Nevada System of Higher Education.)	21,034	Wolf Pack	1925	1940	Mountain West (MW)
University of Nevada	Reno, Nevada	1874	Public	21,034	Wolf Pack	1953	1969	Mountain West (MW)
University of the Pacific	Stockton, California	1911	United; Methodist	6,652	Tigers	1925	1942	West Coast (WCC)
California State University, Sacramento (Note: Formerly known as Sacramento State College until 1972.) (Sacramento State, Sac State)	Sacramento, California	1947	Public	31,943	Hornets	1953	1985	Big Sky (BSC) (Big West (BWC) in 2026)
St. Ignatius College (Note: Currently known as the University of San Francisco since 1930.)	San Francisco, California	1855	Catholic (Jesuit)	10,017	Dons	1927	1929	West Coast (WCC)
Saint Mary's College of California	Moraga, California	1863	Catholic (FSC)	2,775	Gaels	1925	1927	West Coast (WCC)
San Jose State Teachers College (Note: Later known as San Jose State College from 1935 to 1972; then as California State University, San Jose from 1972 to 1974; currently known as San Jose State University since 1974.)	San Jose, California	1857	Public	33,025	Spartans	1929	1935	Mountain West (MW)
Southern Oregon College of Education (Note: Later became known as Southern Oregon College from 1956 to 1975; then as Southern Oregon State College from 1975 to 1997; currently known as Southern Oregon University since 1997.)	Ashland, Oregon	1872	Public	5,371	Raiders	1947	1953	Cascade (CCC) (Note: Currently an NAIA athletic conference.)

=== Membership timeline ===
Full member (all sports) Full member (non-football) Associate member (football)

== Conference champions ==
=== Football ===
- 1925: Saint Mary's
- 1926: Saint Mary's
- 1927: Saint Mary's
- 1928: Saint Mary's
- 1929: Cal Aggies
- 1930: Fresno State
- 1931: No champion
- 1932: Nevada & San Jose State
- 1933: Nevada
- 1934: San Jose State & Fresno State
- 1935: Fresno State
- 1936: Pacific (CA)
- 1937: Fresno State
- 1938: Pacific (CA)
- 1939: Nevada
- 1940: Pacific (CA)
- 1941: Pacific (CA)
- 1942: Pacific (CA)
- 1943: No champion
- 1944: No champion
- 1945: No champion
- 1946: No champion
- 1947: Cal Aggies & Southern Oregon
- 1948: Southern Oregon
- 1949: Cal Aggies
- 1950: San Francisco State
- 1951: Cal Aggies
- 1952: Humboldt State
- 1953: Chico State
- 1954: San Francisco State
- 1955: No champion
- 1956: Cal Aggies, San Francisco State, & Humboldt State
- 1957: San Francisco State
- 1958: San Francisco State
- 1959: San Francisco State
- 1960: Humboldt State
- 1961: Humboldt State & San Francisco State
- 1962: San Francisco State
- 1963: UC Davis, Humboldt State, & San Francisco State
- 1964: Sacramento State
- 1965: San Francisco State
- 1966: Sacramento State
- 1967: San Francisco State
- 1968: Humboldt State
- 1969: Cal State Hayward
- 1970: Cal State Hayward & Chico State
- 1971: UC Davis & Chico State
- 1972: UC Davis
- 1973: UC Davis & Chico State
- 1974: UC Davis
- 1975: UC Davis
- 1976: UC Davis
- 1977: UC Davis
- 1978: UC Davis
- 1979: UC Davis
- 1980: UC Davis
- 1981: Cal State Hayward & UC Davis
- 1982: UC Davis
- 1983: UC Davis
- 1984: UC Davis
- 1985: UC Davis
- 1986: UC Davis
- 1987: UC Davis
- 1988: UC Davis
- 1989: UC Davis
- 1990: UC Davis
- 1991: Sonoma State
- 1992: UC Davis
- 1993: Chico State
- 1994: Chico State, Humboldt State, & Sonoma State
- 1995: Humboldt State
- 1996: Chico State

=== Baseball ===
- 1948: Chico State
- 1949: Chico State
- 1950: Chico State
- 1951: UC Davis
- 1952: Chico State
- 1953: Chico State & Sacramento State
- 1954: Chico State & Sacramento State
- 1955: Sacramento State
- 1956: Sacramento State
- 1957: Sacramento State
- 1958: Sacramento State
- 1959: Sacramento State & Chico State
- 1960: Sacramento State
- 1961: Sacramento State & San Francisco State
- 1962: San Francisco State
- 1963: San Francisco State
- 1964: Sacramento State
- 1965: Sacramento State
- 1968: Sacramento State
- 1969: Sacramento State & San Francisco State
- 1970: Sacramento State
- 1971: Sacramento State
- 1972: Cal State Hayward
- 1973: UC Davis
- 1974: Sacramento State & UC Davis
- 1975: Sacramento State
- 1976: UC Davis
- 1977: Cal State Hayward
- 1978: Chico State
- 1979: UC Davis
- 1983: San Francisco State & Chico State
- 1984: UC Davis
- 1985: Sacramento State (Final season in league), Chico State, & UC Davis
- 1986: San Francisco State
- 1987: Chico State
- 1989: San Francisco State
- 1990: Sonoma State UC Davis
- 1991: Sonoma State
- 1992: Sonoma State
- 1993: UC Davis
- 1994: UC Davis
- 1995: San Francisco State
- 1996: Chico State
- 1997: Chico State
- 1998: Sonoma State & Chico State

Total Baseball Championships

- Sacramento State - 18
- Chico State - 14
- UC Davis - 9
- San Francisco State - 8
- Sonoma State - 4
- Cal State Hayward - 2

=== Women's volleyball ===
- 1982: Sacramento State
- 1983: Sacramento State
- 1984: Sacramento State
- 1995: Sonoma State
- 1997: Sonoma State

=== Men's soccer ===
- 1974: Cal-State Hayward
- 1975: Cal-State Hayward
- 1976: Cal-State Hayward
- 1977:
- 1978:
- 1979:
- 1980:
- 1981:
- 1982: Cal-State Hayward
- 1983: Cal-State Hayward
- 1984: Cal-State Hayward
- 1985: Chico State
- 1986: Chico State
- 1987: Chico State
- 1988: Cal-State Hayward
- 1989: Cal-State Hayward
- 1990: Sonoma State
- 1991: Sonoma State
- 1993: Sonoma State
- 1995: Sonoma State
- 1996: Sonoma State
- 1997: Sonoma State

=== Women's soccer ===
- 1982:
- 1983: Cal-State Hayward
- 1984: Cal-State Hayward
- 1985: Cal-State Hayward
- 1986: Cal-State Hayward
- 1987: Cal-State Hayward
- 1988: Cal-State Hayward (National champions)

=== Women's basketball ===
- 1998: Sonoma State

=== Softball ===
- 1978: Fresno State
- 1982: Fresno State
- 1983: Fresno State
- 1985: Fresno State
- 1986: Fresno State

== See also ==
- List of defunct college football conferences
- California Coast Conference (1922–1928)
