= UFCU Stadium =

Football stadium at Texas State University, San Marcos

Jim Wacker Field at UFCU Stadium
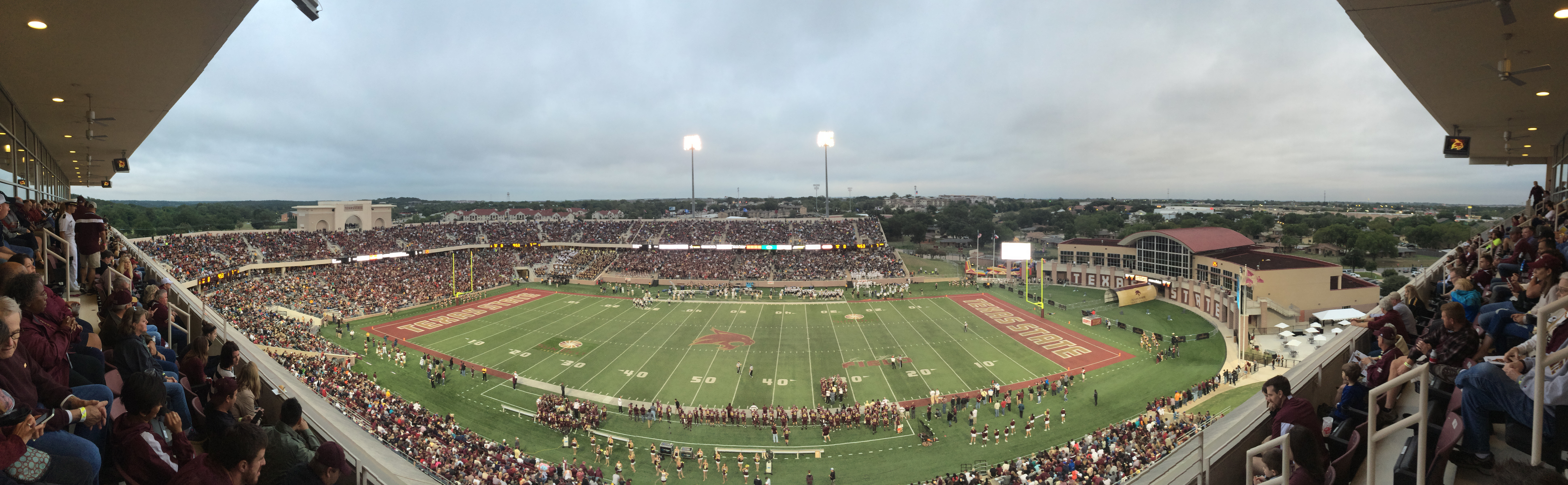
- Stadium interior in 2014

- Location within the United States Location within Texas
- Interactive map of Jim Wacker Field at UFCU Stadium
- Full name: Jim Wacker Field at UFCU Stadium
- Former names: Bobcat Stadium (1981–2024)
- Address: 1100 Aquarena Springs Drive
- Location: Texas State University; San Marcos, Texas, U.S.
- Coordinates: 29°53′28″N 97°55′32″W
- Elevation: 580 feet (180 m) AMSL
- Owner: Texas State University
- Operator: Texas State University
- Capacity: 28,388
- Executive suites: 15
- Surface: FieldTurf Duraspine PRO
- Record attendance: 33,133 (vs. Houston, September 24, 2016)

Construction
- Groundbreaking: 1979
- Opened: 1981; 45 years ago
- Expanded: 2012
- Architects: Lockwood, Andrews & Newnam Inc

Tenants
- Texas State Bobcats football (1981–present); San Antonio Riders (WLAF) (1992)

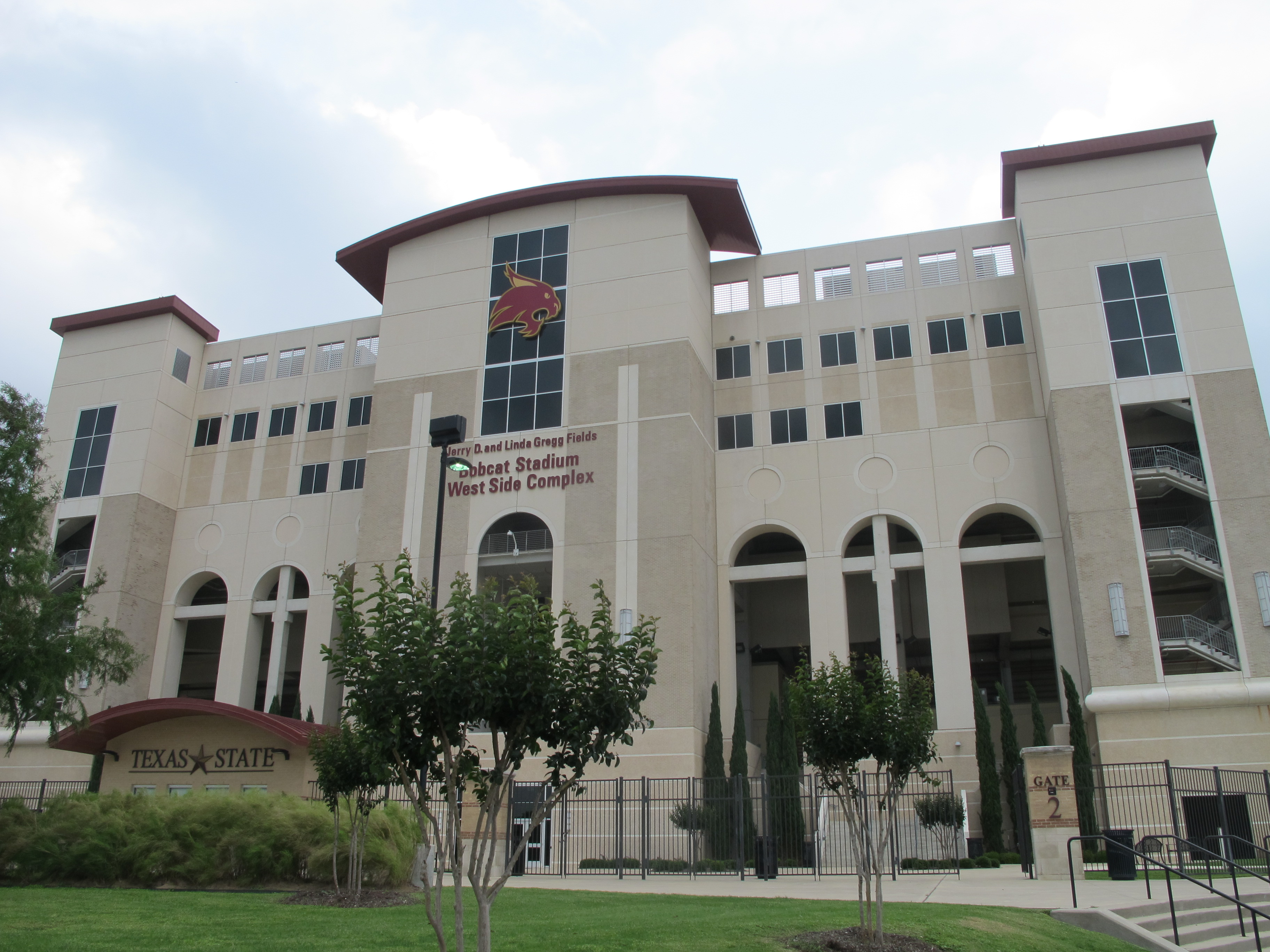
Main Facade, 2016

UFCU Stadium is a college football stadium in the southern United States, located on the campus of Texas State University in San Marcos, Texas. It opened 45 years ago in 1981 and was expanded in 2011–2012 to a 27,149-seat capacity. In 2025, additional seating brought the capacity to 28,388. In November 2003, the field was renamed Jim Wacker Field in honor of the former Bobcats football coach and director of athletics. It is the home field of the Texas State Bobcats of the Pac-12 Conference.

== History ==
The End Zone Complex was completed and dedicated in 2002. The facility located in the south end zone of UFCU Stadium houses the athletic program's football operations. The End Zone Complex also has a full service training center, meeting rooms and coaching staff offices.

The capacity grew to over 16,000 at the beginning of the 2009 football season with the completion of the first phase of a multi-phased expansion. This first phase added The Jerry and Linda Fields West Side Complex, a three-tier structure (by adding onto the existing home side) that includes new premium club seating, with 450 seats, and 15 luxury suites. The facility's funding came from a donation by Texas State alumns Jerry and Linda Fields.

In 2012, a $33 million expansion closing in the north end zone brought the stadium's capacity to 30,003. That season, the average attendance was 18,945 in the program's first season as a Division I FBS member. In 2024, chair back seats were added to the east side, reducing capacity to 27,149. The opening of the new south endzone club and seating, in 2025, brought the capacity back to 28,388.

In May 2024, University Federal Credit Union (UFCU) paid $23 million for the naming rights to the stadium for 15 years.

== Other uses ==
During its 43-year history, UFCU Stadium has been a multi-use facility. It has been the home of the Texas Special Olympics, and used for scenes in the film The Ringer and the NBC series Friday Night Lights.

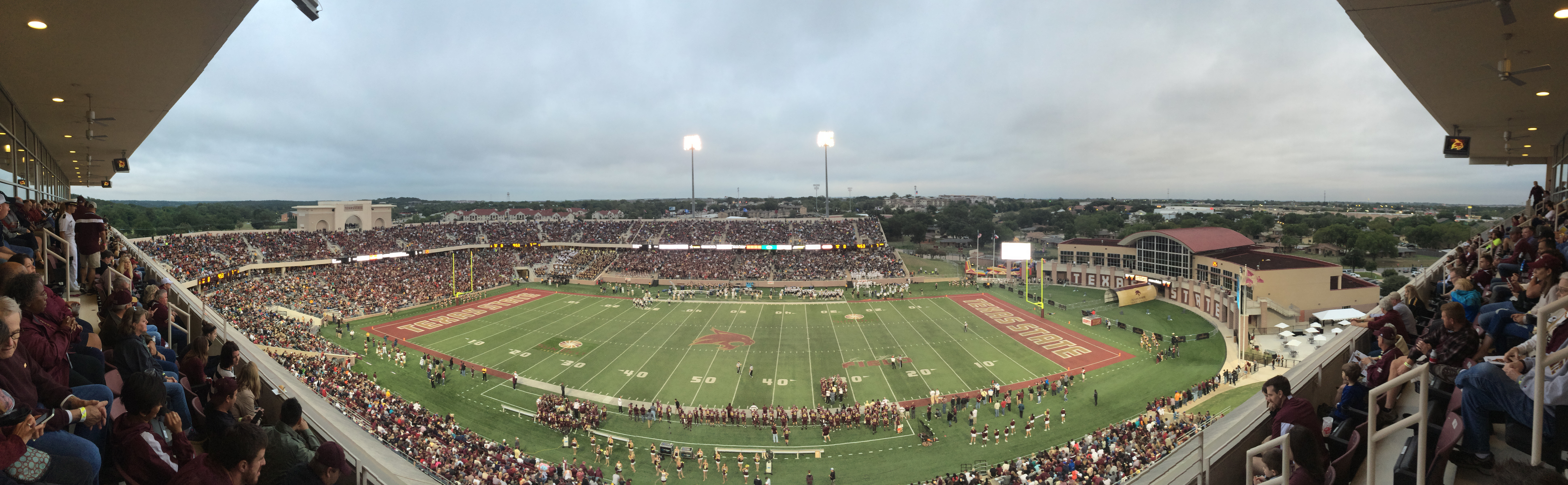
Texas State Bobcats vs Navy Midshipmen - Sept 13, 2014

== Largest single game crowds ==
Rank	Attendance	Date	Game Result
1	33,133	September 24, 2016	Texas State 3, #6 Houston 64
2	33,006	September 8, 2012	Texas State 10, Texas Tech 58
3	32,007	September 13, 2014	Texas State 21, Navy 35
4	31,500	September 20, 2025	Texas State 35, Nicholls 3
5	31,333	September 23, 2017	Texas State 14, UTSA 44
6	28,000	September 7, 2024	Texas State 49, UTSA 10
7	28,000	October 12, 2024	Texas State 41, Arkansas State 9
8	27,537	October 14, 2023	Texas State 21, ULM 20
9	27,252	September 19, 2015	Texas State 20, Southern Miss 50
10	26,573	September 4, 2021	Texas State 20, Baylor 29

== See also ==
- List of NCAA Division I FBS football stadiums
