= 1994 NCAA Division II football rankings =

The 1994 NCAA Division II football rankings are from the NCAA Division II football committee. This is for the 1994 season.

== Legend ==
	Increase in ranking
	Decrease in ranking
	Not ranked previous week
(#–#)	Win–loss record
(Italics)	Number of first place votes
т	Tied with team above or below also with this symbol

== NCAA Division II Football Committee poll ==
	Preseason	Week 1 Sept 14	Week 2 Sept 21	Week 3 Sept 28	Week 4 Oct 5	Week 5 Oct 12	Week 6 Oct 19	Week 7 Oct 26	Week 8 Nov 2	Week 9 Nov 9	
1.	North Alabama (4)	North Alabama (1–0) (4)	North Alabama (3–0) (4)	North Alabama (4–0) (4)	North Alabama (4–0) (4)	North Alabama (4–1) (3)	North Alabama (5–1) (4)	North Alabama (6–1) (4)	North Alabama (7–1) (4)	North Alabama (8–1) (4)	1.
2.	IUP (Note: In the actual printed polls, IUP was listed as Indiana (PA))	IUP (2–0)	North Dakota State (2–0)	North Dakota State (3–0)	North Dakota State (4–0)	North Dakota State (5–0) (1)	North Dakota State (6–0)	North Dakota State (7–0)	Valdosta State (9–0)	Texas A&M–Kingsville (8–1)	2.
3.	North Dakota State	North Dakota State (1–0)	Texas A&M–Kingsville (2–0)	Texas A&M–Kingsville (3–0)	Valdosta State (5–0)	Valdosta State (6–0)	Valdosta State (7–0)	Valdosta State (8–0)	Texas A&M–Kingsville (7–1)	Pittsburg State (9–0)	3.
4.	Texas A&M–Kingsville	Texas A&M–Kingsville (2–0)	New Haven (3–0)	Pittsburg State (3–0) т	Pittsburg State (4–0)	Texas A&M–Kingsville (4–1)	Texas A&M–Kingsville (5–1)	Texas A&M–Kingsville (6–1)	Pittsburg State (8–0)	Portland State (7–2)	4.
5.	New Haven	New Haven (2–0)	Pittsburg State (2–0)	Valdosta State (4–0) т	New Haven (3–1) т	Pittsburg State (5–0)	Pittsburg State (6–0)	Pittsburg State (7–0)	Portland State (7–2)	Ferris State (9–0)	5.
6.	Portland State	Portland State (2–0) т	Portland State (2–1)	New Haven (3–1)	Texas A&M–Kingsville (3–1) т	Portland State (4–2)	Portland State (5–2)	Portland State (6–2)	Ferris State (8–0)	Valdosta State (9–1)	6.
7.	Pittsburg State	Pittsburg State (1–0) т	Valdosta State (3–0)	Northeast Missouri State (3–0)	Northeast Missouri State (4–0)	Ferris State (5–0)	Ferris State (6–0)	Ferris State (7–0)	Northeast Missouri State (8–0)	New Haven (7–2)	7.
8.	Albany State	Albany State (2–0)	IUP (1–1)	Portland State (2–2)	Portland State (3–2)	Northeast Missouri State (5–0)	Northeast Missouri State (6–0)	Northeast Missouri State (7–0)	New Haven (6–2)	Northeast Missouri State (8–1) т	8.
9.	North Dakota	North Dakota (2–0)	North Dakota (2–0)	Ferris State (3–0)	Ferris State (4–0)	Central Oklahoma (6–0)	New Haven (4–2)	New Haven (5–2)	IUP (6–2)	IUP (7–2) т	9.
10.	Carson–Newman	Valdosta State (2–0)	Northeast Missouri State (2–0)	Carson–Newman (3–1)	Central Oklahoma (5–0)	Carson–Newman (5–1) т	Central Oklahoma (6–1)	IUP (5–2)	North Dakota State (7–1)	West Georgia (7–2)	10.
11.	UC Davis	Northeast Missouri State (2–0)	West Georgia (3–0) т	Central Oklahoma (4–0)	Carson–Newman (4–1)	Millersville (5–0) т	IUP (4–2)	West Georgia (5–2)	West Georgia (6–2)	Albany State (9–1)	11.
12.	Grand Valley State	Ferris State (1–0)	Ferris State (2–0) т	Millersville (3–0)	Millersville (4–0)	Northern Colorado (5–1)	St. Cloud State (5–1)	West Chester (7–1)	Albany State (8–1)	North Dakota State (7–2)	12.
13.	Central Missouri State т	West Georgia (2–0)	Central Oklahoma (3–0)	East Texas State (3–1)	Central Arkansas (4–1)	New Haven (3–2)	West Georgia (5–1)	Albany State (7–1)	North Dakota (6–2)	Angelo State (6–3)	13.
14.	Virginia State т	UC Davis (1–0) т	Grand Valley State (2–1)	Central Arkansas (3–1) т	Northern Colorado (2–1)	West Chester (5–1)	West Chester (6–1)	Angelo State (5–3)	Western State (CO) (7–1)	Western State (CO) (8–1)	14.
15.	Western State (CO)	Nebraska–Kearney (2–0) т	Carson–Newman (2–1)	Grand Valley State (3–1) т	West Chester (4–1)	West Georgia (5–1)	Albany State (6–1)	South Dakota State (6–2)	Angelo State (5–3)	North Dakota (7–2)	15.
16.	Fort Valley State	Central Oklahoma (2–0)	South Dakota State (3–0)	Nebraska–Kearney (4–0)	West Georgia (4–1) т	UC Davis (3–2)	Northern Colorado (6–1)	Edinboro (6–1)	South Dakota State (7–2)	Carson–Newman (8–2)	16.
17.	Mankato State	Grand Valley State (1–1)	Millersville (2–0)	Abilene Christian (2–2)	UC Davis (2–2) т	IUP (3–2)	UC Davis (3–3)	Central Oklahoma (6–2)	Grand Valley State (6–3)	Edinboro (7–2)	17.
18.	Valdosta State	Carson–Newman (1–1)	East Texas State (2–1)	IUP (1–2)	South Dakota State (4–1)	Albany State (5–1)	Western State (CO) (5–1)	St. Cloud State (5–2)	Central Oklahoma (6–2)	Grand Valley State (7–3)	18.
19.	Gardner–Webb	Millersville (2–0)	Eastern New Mexico (3–0)	Northern Colorado (2–1)	IUP (2–2)	St. Cloud State (4–1)	Edinboro (5–1)	UC Davis (4–3)	Carson–Newman (7–2)	South Dakota State (7–3)	19.
20.	East Stroudsburg	Western State (CO) (2–0)	Livingstone (3–0)	East Stroudsburg (3–0)	Eastern New Mexico (4–1)	Western State (CO) (4–1)	Livingstone (5–1)	Western State (CO) (6–1)	Edinboro (6–2)	Central Oklahoma (6–3)	20.
	Preseason	Week 1 Sept 14	Week 2 Sept 21	Week 3 Sept 28	Week 4 Oct 5	Week 5 Oct 12	Week 6 Oct 19	Week 7 Oct 26	Week 8 Nov 2	Week 9 Nov 9	
		Dropped: 13 Central Missouri State; 14 Virginia State; 16 Fort Valley State; 17 Mankato State; 19 Gardner–Webb; 20 East Stroudsburg	Dropped: 8 Albany State; 14 UC Davis; 15 Nebraska–Kearney; 20 Western State (CO)	Dropped: 9 North Dakota; 11 West Georgia; 16 South Dakota State; 19 Eastern New Mexico; 20 Livingstone	Dropped: 13 East Texas State; 15 Grand Valley State; 16 Nebraska–Kearney; 17 Abilene Christian; 20 East Stroudsburg	Dropped: 13 Central Arkansas; 18 South Dakota State; 20 Eastern New Mexico	Dropped: 10 Carson–Newman; 11 Millersville	Dropped: 16 Northern Colorado; 20 Livingstone	Dropped: 12 West Chester; 18 St. Cloud State; 19 UC Davis	None	
