= 1994 Iona Gaels football team =

American college football season

1994 Iona Gaels football
- Conference: Metro Atlantic Athletic Conference
- Record: 3–6 (3–4 MAAC)
- Head coach: Harold Crocker (10th season)
- Home stadium: Mazzella Field

1994 Metro Atlantic Athletic Conference football standings
	Conf.					Overall
Team	W		L		T	W		L		T
St. John's +	6	–	1	–	0	10	–	1	–	0
Marist +	6	–	1	–	0	7	–	3	–	0
Duquesne	4	–	3	–	0	6	–	4	–	0
Georgetown	4	–	3	–	0	5	–	4	–	0
Iona	3	–	4	–	0	3	–	6	–	0
Siena	3	–	4	–	0	3	–	6	–	0
Canisius	2	–	5	–	0	2	–	8	–	0
Saint Peter's	0	–	7	–	0	0	–	9	–	0
+ – Conference co-champions

The 1994 Iona Gaels football team was an American football team that represented Iona College (now known as Iona University) as a member of the Metro Atlantic Athletic Conference (MAAC) during the 1994 NCAA Division I-AA football season. In their tenth year under head coach Harold Crocker, the team compiled an overall record of 3–6, with a mark of 3–4 in conference play, and finished tied for fifth in the MAAC.

== Schedule ==
Date	Opponent	Site	Result	Attendance	Source
September 17	at Marist	Leonidoff Field; Poughkeepsie, NY	L 19–37	1,423	
September 24	at Georgetown	Kehoe Field; Washington, DC	W 31–28	1,837	
October 1	Siena^{†}	Mazzella Field; New Rochelle, NY	L 21–38		
October 8	at Pace*	Finnerty Field; Pleasantville, NY	L 24–28	550	
October 15	Saint Peter's	Mazzella Field; New Rochelle, NY	W 31–14		
October 22	Wagner*	Mazzella Field; New Rochelle, NY	L 22–39		
October 31	at Duquesne	Arthur J. Rooney Athletic Field; Pittsburgh, PA	L 12–16		
November 5	Canisius	Mazzella Field; New Rochelle, NY	W 14–7		
November 12	St. John's	Mazzella Field; New Rochelle, NY	L 7–21		
*Non-conference game; ^{†}Homecoming
