= 1994 Canisius Golden Griffins football team =

American college football season

1994 Canisius Golden Griffins football
- Conference: Metro Atlantic Athletic Conference
- Record: 2–8 (2–5 MAAC)
- Head coach: Barry Mynter (3rd season)
- Home stadium: Demske Sports Complex

1994 Metro Atlantic Athletic Conference football standings
| | Conf. | | | | | Overall |
| Team | W | | L | | T | W | | L | | T |
|---|---|---|---|---|---|---|---|---|---|---|
| St. John's + | 6 | – | 1 | – | 0 | 10 | – | 1 | – | 0 |
| Marist + | 6 | – | 1 | – | 0 | 7 | – | 3 | – | 0 |
| Duquesne | 4 | – | 3 | – | 0 | 6 | – | 4 | – | 0 |
| Georgetown | 4 | – | 3 | – | 0 | 5 | – | 4 | – | 0 |
| Iona | 3 | – | 4 | – | 0 | 3 | – | 6 | – | 0 |
| Siena | 3 | – | 4 | – | 0 | 3 | – | 6 | – | 0 |
| Canisius | 2 | – | 5 | – | 0 | 2 | – | 8 | – | 0 |
| Saint Peter's | 0 | – | 7 | – | 0 | 0 | – | 9 | – | 0 |
+ – Conference co-champions

The 1994 Canisius Golden Griffins football team represented Canisius College as a member of the Metro Atlantic Athletic Conference (MAAC) during the 1994 NCAA Division I-AA football season. Led by Barry Mynter in his third and final season as head coach, the Golden Griffins compiled an overall record of 2–8 with a mark of 2–5 in conference play, placing seventh in the MAAC. The Canisius offense scored 132 points while the defense allowed 183 points.

== Schedule ==
| Date | Opponent | Site | Result | Attendance | Source |
|---|---|---|---|---|---|
| September 10 | at Mercyhurst* | Erie Veterans Memorial Stadium; Erie, PA | L 12–13 | 1,547 | |
| September 17 | Buffalo State* | Demske Sports Complex; Buffalo, NY | L 6–31 | 1,521 | |
| September 24 | Siena | Demske Sports Complex; Buffalo, NY | W 28–7 | | |
| October 1 | at Georgetown | Kehoe Field; Washington, DC | L 14–21 | 2,021 | |
| October 8 | at Gannon* | Erie Veterans Memorial Stadium; Erie, PA | L 7–21 | 2,743 | |
| October 15 | St. John's | Demske Sports Complex; Buffalo, NY | L 22–34 | 773 | |
| October 22 | at Marist | Leonidoff Field; Poughkeepsie, NY | L 0–13 | | |
| October 29 | Saint Peter's | Demske Sports Complex; Buffalo, NY | W 36–15 | 387 | |
| November 5 | at Iona | Mazzella Field; New Rochelle, NY | L 7–14 | | |
| November 12 | Duquesne | Demske Sports Complex; Buffalo, NY | L 0–14 | 764 | |
*Non-conference game
