= 1994 Saint Peter's Peacocks football team =

American college football season

1994 Saint Peter's Peacocks football
- Conference: Metro Atlantic Athletic Conference
- Record: 0–9 (0–7 MAAC)
- Head coach: Mark Collins (1st season)
- Home stadium: JFK Stadium

1994 Metro Atlantic Athletic Conference football standings
	Conf.					Overall
Team	W		L		T	W		L		T
St. John's +	6	–	1	–	0	10	–	1	–	0
Marist +	6	–	1	–	0	7	–	3	–	0
Duquesne	4	–	3	–	0	6	–	4	–	0
Georgetown	4	–	3	–	0	5	–	4	–	0
Iona	3	–	4	–	0	3	–	6	–	0
Siena	3	–	4	–	0	3	–	6	–	0
Canisius	2	–	5	–	0	2	–	8	–	0
Saint Peter's	0	–	7	–	0	0	–	9	–	0
+ – Conference co-champions

The 1994 Saint Peter's Peacocks football team was an American football team that represented Saint Peter's College (now known as Saint Peter's University) as a member of the Metro Atlantic Athletic Conference (MAAC) during the 1994 NCAA Division I-AA football season. In their first year under head coach Mark Collins, the team compiled an overall record of 0–9, with a mark of 0–8 in conference play, and finished eighth in the MAAC.

Collins was hired in March 1994 as the first, full-time head coach of the Peacocks.

== Schedule ==
Date	Opponent	Site	Result	Source
September 24	Siena	JFK Stadium; Hoboken, NJ	L 23–22 (forfeit)	
September 24	Duquesne	JFK Stadium; Hoboken, NJ	L 21–40	
October 1	Central Connecticut State*	JFK Stadium; Hoboken, NJ	L 23–36	
October 8	Marist	JFK Stadium; Hoboken, NJ	L 0–33	
October 15	at Iona	Mazzella Field; New Rochelle, NY	L 14–31	
October 22	St. John's	JFK Stadium; Hoboken, NJ	L 7–27	
October 29	at Canisius	Demske Sports Complex; Buffalo, NY	L 15–36	
November 5	at Wagner*	Fischer Memorial Stadium; Staten Island, NY	L 3–42	
November 12	at Georgetown	Kehoe Field; Washington, DC	L 7–41	
*Non-conference game
