= Bob Benson (American football) =

American football coach

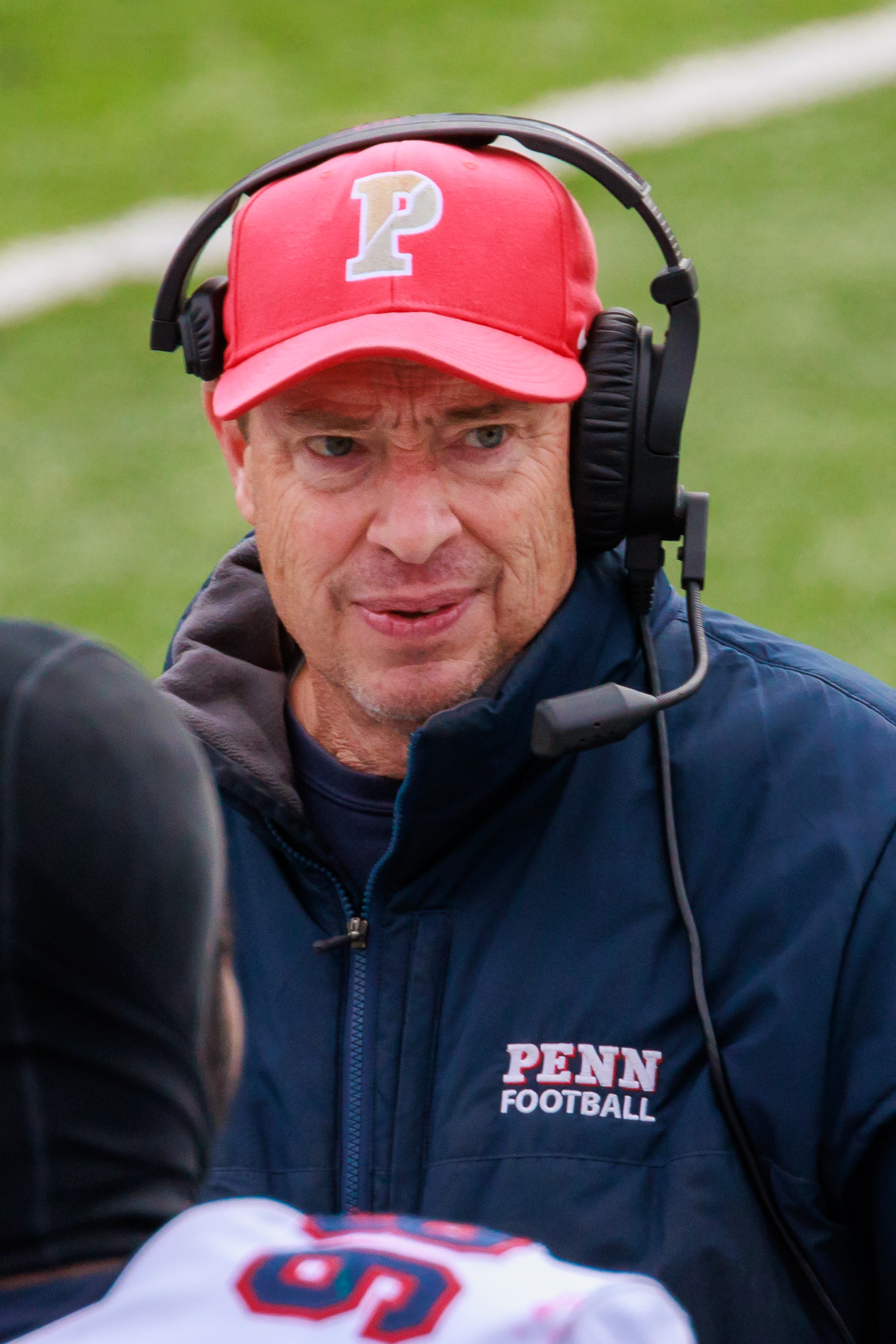
- Benson in 2024

Biographical details
- Education: Vermont (BA, 1986); Albany (MA, 1987)

Playing career
- c. 1984: Marietta
- Position: Wide receiver

Coaching career (HC unless noted)
- 1986–1987: Albany (GA)
- 1988–1989: WPI (DC)
- 1990–1992: Johns Hopkins (DC)
- 1993–2005: Georgetown
- 2006–2007: Towson (DC)
- 2008–2013: Colorado Mines (DC)
- 2014: Albany (DC)
- 2015–2025: Penn (assoc. HC/DC)

Head coaching record
- Overall: 72–64

Accomplishments and honors

Championships
- 3 MAAC (1997–1999)

Bob Benson is an American football coach. He most recently served as the defensive coordinator at the University of Pennsylvania, a position he held from 2015 until 2025. Benson was the head football coach at Georgetown University in Washington, D.C. from 1993 to 2005, compiling a record of 72–64.

== Head coaching record ==
| Year | Team | Overall | Conference | Standing | Bowl/playoffs |
|---|---|---|---|---|---|
Georgetown Hoyas (Metro Atlantic Athletic Conference) (1993–2000)
| 1993 | Georgetown | 4–5 | 2–3 | 4th | |
| 1994 | Georgetown | 5–4 | 4–3 | T–3rd | |
| 1995 | Georgetown | 6–3 | 5–2 | 2nd | |
| 1996 | Georgetown | 7–3 | 7–1 | 2nd | |
| 1997 | Georgetown | 8–3 | 7–0 | 1st | |
| 1998 | Georgetown | 9–2 | 7–1 | T–1st | |
| 1999 | Georgetown | 9–2 | 7–1 | T–1st | |
| 2000 | Georgetown | 5–6 | 3–2 | 4th | |
Georgetown Hoyas (Patriot League) (2001–2005)
| 2001 | Georgetown | 3–7 | 0–6 | 8th | |
| 2002 | Georgetown | 5–6 | 2–5 | T–6th | |
| 2003 | Georgetown | 4–8 | 1–6 | T–7th | |
| 2004 | Georgetown | 3–8 | 0–6 | 7th | |
| 2005 | Georgetown | 4–7 | 2–4 | T–5th | |
| Georgetown: | | 72–64 | 47–40 | | |
| Total: | | 72–64 | | | |
National championship Conference title Conference division title or championship game berth
