= 1994 Buffalo Bulls football team =

American college football season

1994 Buffalo Bulls football
- Conference: Independent
- Record: 3–8
- Head coach: Jim Ward (3rd season)
- Captain: None
- Home stadium: University at Buffalo Stadium

1994 NCAA Division I-AA independents football standings
| | Conf. | | | Overall |
| Team | W | L | T | W | | L | | T |
|---|---|---|---|---|---|---|---|---|
| No. 1 Youngstown State ^ | | – | | 11 | – | 0 | – | 1 |
| No. 23 Hofstra | | – | | 8 | – | 1 | – | 1 |
| Towson State | | – | | 8 | – | 2 | – | 0 |
| No. 10 Troy State ^ | | – | | 8 | – | 4 | – | 0 |
| Robert Morris | | – | | 7 | – | 1 | – | 1 |
| Monmouth | | – | | 7 | – | 2 | – | 0 |
| Saint Mary's | | – | | 7 | – | 3 | – | 0 |
| UAB | | – | | 7 | – | 4 | – | 0 |
| No. 20 UCF | | – | | 7 | – | 4 | – | 0 |
| Wagner | | – | | 6 | – | 5 | – | 0 |
| Liberty | | – | | 5 | – | 6 | – | 0 |
| Western Kentucky | | – | | 5 | – | 6 | – | 0 |
| Central Connecticut State | | – | | 4 | – | 6 | – | 0 |
| Samford | | – | | 4 | – | 6 | – | 1 |
| Davidson | | – | | 3 | – | 7 | – | 0 |
| Buffalo | | – | | 3 | – | 8 | – | 0 |
| Saint Francis (PA) | | – | | 2 | – | 7 | – | 1 |
| Charleston Southern | | – | | 0 | – | 11 | – | 0 |
^ – NCAA Division I-AA playoff participant; Rankings from The Sports Network poll

The 1994 Buffalo Bulls football team represented the University at Buffalo as an independent during the 1994 NCAA Division I-AA football season. Led by Jim Ward in his third and final season as head coach, the Bulls compiled a record of 3–8. The team played home games at University at Buffalo Stadium in Amherst, New York.

== Schedule ==
| Date | Time | Opponent | Site | Result | Attendance | Source |
|---|---|---|---|---|---|---|
| September 3 | 6:00 pm | at James Madison | Bridgeforth Stadium; Harrisonburg, VA | L 0–35 | | |
| September 10 | 6:00 pm | at Towson State | Minnegan Stadium; Towson, MD | L 16–32 | 2,144 | |
| September 17 | 7:00 pm | Lehigh | University at Buffalo Stadium; Amherst, NY | L 19–48 | | |
| September 24 | 1:30 pm | Cheyney | University at Buffalo Stadium; Amherst, NY | W 36–10 | | |
| October 8 | 1:30 pm | Colgate^{†} | University at Buffalo Stadium; Amherst, NY | W 23–10 | 6,761 | |
| October 15 | 7:00 pm | Illinois State | University at Buffalo Stadium; Amherst, NY | L 7–17 | 3,295 | |
| October 22 | 7:00 pm | No. 21 Hofstra | University at Buffalo Stadium; Amherst, NY | L 21–34 | 3,009 | |
| October 29 | 6:00 pm | vs. Maine | Fitzpatrick Stadium; Portland, ME | W 24–21 | 3,787 | |
| November 5 | 1:30 pm | Youngstown State | University at Buffalo Stadium; Amherst, NY | L 3–27 | 3,374 | |
| November 12 | 1:30 pm | at Western Illinois | Hanson Field; Macomb, IL | L 7–49 | 3,961 | |
| November 19 | 1:00 pm | at UCF | Florida Citrus Bowl; Orlando, FL | L 0–48 | 18,856 | |
^{†}Homecoming; Rankings from The Sports Network Poll released prior to the game; All times are in Eastern time
