= Jim Ward (American football coach) =

American football coach (1948–2001)

Biographical details
- Born: January 2, 1948
- Died: April 26, 2001 (aged 53); Buffalo, New York, U.S.

Coaching career (HC unless noted)
- 1984–1988: Howard (OC)
- 1989–1990: Norfolk State (OC)
- 1991: Buffalo (OC)
- 1992–1994: Buffalo

Head coaching record
- Overall: 8–24

James B. Ward Jr. (January 2, 1948 – April 26, 2001) was an American college football coach. He served as the head football coach at the University at Buffalo from 1992 to 1994, compiling a record of 8–24.

Before coaching at Buffalo, Ward was a football coach at Northwestern High School and Howard University. Following his tenure at the University at Buffalo, Ward held multiple positions, including physical education teacher and vice principal at Seneca Vocational High School, principal of Douglass High School, and County Youth Commissioner for Erie County, New York. He resigned from that position in 2000, after he pleaded guilty to accepting unemployment benefits while he was employed by the Buffalo Public Schools system.

Ward died in 2001 from a heart attack, while attending church services at Mount Olive Baptist Church in Buffalo, New York.

== Head coaching record ==
Year	Team	Overall	Conference	Standing	Bowl/playoffs
Buffalo Bulls (NCAA Division III independent) (1992–1994)
1992	Buffalo	4–6			
Buffalo Bulls (NCAA Division I-AA independent) (1993–1994)
1993	Buffalo	1–10			
1994	Buffalo	3–8			
Buffalo:		8–24			
Total:		8–24			
