= 1994 Towson State Tigers football team =

American college football season

1994 Towson State Tigers football
- Conference: Independent
- Record: 8–2
- Head coach: Gordy Combs (3rd season)
- Home stadium: Minnegan Stadium

1994 NCAA Division I-AA independents football standings
	Conf.			Overall
Team	W	L	T	W		L		T
No. 1 Youngstown State ^		–		11	–	0	–	1
No. 23 Hofstra		–		8	–	1	–	1
Towson State		–		8	–	2	–	0
No. 10 Troy State ^		–		8	–	4	–	0
Robert Morris		–		7	–	1	–	1
Monmouth		–		7	–	2	–	0
Saint Mary's		–		7	–	3	–	0
UAB		–		7	–	4	–	0
No. 20 UCF		–		7	–	4	–	0
Wagner		–		6	–	5	–	0
Liberty		–		5	–	6	–	0
Western Kentucky		–		5	–	6	–	0
Central Connecticut State		–		4	–	6	–	0
Samford		–		4	–	6	–	1
Davidson		–		3	–	7	–	0
Buffalo		–		3	–	8	–	0
Saint Francis (PA)		–		2	–	7	–	1
Charleston Southern		–		0	–	11	–	0
^ – NCAA Division I-AA playoff participant; Rankings from The Sports Network poll

The 1994 Towson State Tigers football team was an American football team that represented Towson State University (now known as Towson University) as an independent during the 1994 NCAA Division I-AA football season. Led by second-year head coach Gordy Combs, the team compiled a 8–2 record.

== Schedule ==
Date	Opponent	Site	Result	Attendance	Source
September 10	Buffalo	Minnegan Stadium; Towson, MD	W 32–16	2,144	
September 17	vs. Delaware State	Daniel S. Frawley Stadium; Wilmington, DE (Wilmington Classic)	W 42–18	4,700	
September 24	at Charleston Southern	Buccaneer Field; North Charleston, SC	W 51–0	1,110	
October 1	at Howard	William H. Greene Stadium; Washington, DC	L 13–19	7,984	
October 8	at Bucknell	Christy Mathewson–Memorial Stadium; Lewisburg, PA	L 28–41	2,712	
October 22	American International	Minnegan Stadium; Towson, MD	W 48–6		
October 28	at No. 20 Hofstra	Hofstra Stadium; Hempstead, NY	W 24–21	5,829	
November 5	Kutztown	Minnegan Stadium; Towson, MD	W 36–31		
November 12	at Southern Connecticut State	Jess Dow Field; New Haven, CT	W 48–0	650	
November 19	Morgan State	Minnegan Stadium; Towson, MD (rivalry)	W 42–7	2,763	
Rankings from The Sports Network Poll released prior to the game
