= 1994 UAB Blazers football team =

American college football season

1994 UAB Blazers football
- Conference: Independent
- Record: 7–4
- Head coach: Jim Hilyer (4th season)
- Offensive coordinator: Dieter Brock (1st season)
- Offensive scheme: Pro-style
- Base defense: 3–4
- Home stadium: Legion Field

1994 NCAA Division I-AA independents football standings
	Conf.			Overall
Team	W	L	T	W		L		T
No. 1 Youngstown State ^		–		11	–	0	–	1
No. 23 Hofstra		–		8	–	1	–	1
Towson State		–		8	–	2	–	0
No. 10 Troy State ^		–		8	–	4	–	0
Robert Morris		–		7	–	1	–	1
Monmouth		–		7	–	2	–	0
Saint Mary's		–		7	–	3	–	0
UAB		–		7	–	4	–	0
No. 20 UCF		–		7	–	4	–	0
Wagner		–		6	–	5	–	0
Liberty		–		5	–	6	–	0
Western Kentucky		–		5	–	6	–	0
Central Connecticut State		–		4	–	6	–	0
Samford		–		4	–	6	–	1
Davidson		–		3	–	7	–	0
Buffalo		–		3	–	8	–	0
Saint Francis (PA)		–		2	–	7	–	1
Charleston Southern		–		0	–	11	–	0
^ – NCAA Division I-AA playoff participant; Rankings from The Sports Network poll

The 1994 UAB Blazers football team represented the University of Alabama at Birmingham (UAB) in the 1994 NCAA Division I-AA football season, and was the fourth team fielded by the school. The Blazers were led by head coach Jim Hilyer, who entered his fourth season as the UAB's head coach. They played their home games at Legion Field in Birmingham, Alabama and competed as a Division I-AA Independent. The Blazers finished their second season at the I-AA level with a record of seven wins and four losses (7–4).

== Schedule ==
Date	Opponent	Site	Result	Attendance	Source
September 3	at Alabama State	Cramton Bowl; Montgomery, AL	L 24–27	14,750	
September 10	at Dayton	Welcome Stadium; Dayton, OH	W 28–10	10,112	
September 17	Jacksonville State	Legion Field; Birmingham, AL	L 12–28	17,222	
September 24	at Kansas	Memorial Stadium; Lawrence, KS	L 0–72	35,000	
October 1	No. 14 Western Kentucky	Legion Field; Birmingham, AL	L 22–31	20,237	
October 8	Wofford	Legion Field; Birmingham, AL	W 34–27	20,237	
October 15	Mississippi Valley State	Legion Field; Birmingham, AL	W 24–14	20,237	
October 22	Charleston Southern^{†}	Legion Field; Birmingham, AL	W 54–14	20,237	
October 29	at Morehead State	Jayne Stadium; Morehead, KY	W 36–15	2,500	
November 5	Butler	Legion Field; Birmingham, AL	W 19–14	20,237	
November 19	at Prairie View A&M	Edward L. Blackshear Field; Prairie View, TX	W 48–6	2,007	
^{†}Homecoming; Rankings from Coaches' Poll released prior to the game
