= 1994 Wagner Seahawks football team =

American college football season

1994 Wagner Seahawks football

ECAC–Division I-AA Bowl, L 14–34 vs. St. John's
- Conference: Independent
- Record: 6–5
- Head coach: Walt Hameline (14th season)
- Home stadium: Wagner College Stadium

1994 NCAA Division I-AA independents football standings
	Conf.			Overall
Team	W	L	T	W		L		T
No. 1 Youngstown State ^		–		11	–	0	–	1
No. 23 Hofstra		–		8	–	1	–	1
Towson State		–		8	–	2	–	0
No. 10 Troy State ^		–		8	–	4	–	0
Robert Morris		–		7	–	1	–	1
Monmouth		–		7	–	2	–	0
Saint Mary's		–		7	–	3	–	0
UAB		–		7	–	4	–	0
No. 20 UCF		–		7	–	4	–	0
Wagner		–		6	–	5	–	0
Liberty		–		5	–	6	–	0
Western Kentucky		–		5	–	6	–	0
Central Connecticut State		–		4	–	6	–	0
Samford		–		4	–	6	–	1
Davidson		–		3	–	7	–	0
Buffalo		–		3	–	8	–	0
Saint Francis (PA)		–		2	–	7	–	1
Charleston Southern		–		0	–	11	–	0
^ – NCAA Division I-AA playoff participant; Rankings from The Sports Network poll

The 1994 Wagner Seahawks football team represented Wagner College in the 1994 NCAA Division I-AA football season as an independent. The Seahawks were led by 14th-year head coach Walt Hameline and played their home games at Wagner College Stadium. They finished the season 6–5 and lost in the ECAC–IFC Division I-AA Bowl to St. John's.

== Schedule ==
Date	Opponent	Site	Result	Attendance	Source
September 9	at Springfield	Benedum Field; Springfield, MA	L 7–33		
September 17	at C. W. Post	Hickox Field; Brookville, NY	L 17–21		
September 24	Marist	Fischer Memorial Stadium; Staten Island, NY	W 30–8	1,846	
October 1	Monmouth	Fischer Memorial Stadium; Staten Island, NY	L 14–22		
October 8	San Diego	Fischer Memorial Stadium; Staten Island, NY	L 35–45	1,446	
October 15	Robert Morris	Fischer Memorial Stadium; Staten Island, NY	W 38–21		
October 22	at Iona	Mazzella Field; New Rochelle, NY	W 39–22		
October 29	at Central Connecticut State	Arute Field; New Britain, CT	W 28–21		
November 5	Saint Peter's	Fischer Memorial Stadium; Staten Island, NY	W 42–3		
November 12	at Saint Francis (PA)	Pine Bowl; Loretto, PA	W 35–13		
November 19	at St. John's	DaSilva Memorial Field; Jamaica, NY (ECAC Division I-AA Bowl)	L 14–34		
