= 1994 Davidson Wildcats football team =

American college football season

1994 Davidson Wildcats football
- Conference: Independent
- Record: 3–7
- Head coach: Tim Landis (2nd season)
- Home stadium: Richardson Stadium

1994 NCAA Division I-AA independents football standings
	Conf.			Overall
Team	W	L	T	W		L		T
No. 1 Youngstown State ^		–		11	–	0	–	1
No. 23 Hofstra		–		8	–	1	–	1
Towson State		–		8	–	2	–	0
No. 10 Troy State ^		–		8	–	4	–	0
Robert Morris		–		7	–	1	–	1
Monmouth		–		7	–	2	–	0
Saint Mary's		–		7	–	3	–	0
UAB		–		7	–	4	–	0
No. 20 UCF		–		7	–	4	–	0
Wagner		–		6	–	5	–	0
Liberty		–		5	–	6	–	0
Western Kentucky		–		5	–	6	–	0
Central Connecticut State		–		4	–	6	–	0
Samford		–		4	–	6	–	1
Davidson		–		3	–	7	–	0
Buffalo		–		3	–	8	–	0
Saint Francis (PA)		–		2	–	7	–	1
Charleston Southern		–		0	–	11	–	0
^ – NCAA Division I-AA playoff participant; Rankings from The Sports Network poll

The 1994 Davidson Wildcats football team was an American football team that represented Davidson College as an independent during the 1994 NCAA Division I-AA football season. Led by second-year head coach Tim Landis, the team compiled a 3–7 record.

== Schedule ==
Date	Opponent	Site	Result	Attendance	Source
September 17	at Maryville	Honaker Field; Maryville, TN	L 14–19		
September 24	Emory and Henry	Richardson Stadium; Davidson, NC	L 7–34	2,204	
October 1	Guilford	Richardson Stadium; Davidson, NC	L 14–34		
October 8	Washington and Lee	Richardson Stadium; Davidson, NC	L 3–9		
October 15	at Methodist	Monarch Stadium; Fayetteville, NC	W 9–6	861	
October 22	at Randolph–Macon	Day Field; Ashland, VA	L 14–28	3,900	
October 29	at Hampden–Sydney	Hundley Stadium; Hampden Sydney, VA	L 7–12	2,383	
November 5	Centre	Richardson Stadium; Davidson, NC	L 7–9		
November 12	at Bridgewater	Jopson Athletic Complex; Bridgewater, VA	W 37–6		
November 19	vs. Sewanee*	Bermuda National Stadium; Hamilton, Bermuda (Bermuda Bowl)	W 28–14	2,000	
*Non-conference game
