= Harold Crocker (American football) =

American college athletics administrator and football coach

Playing career
- 1973: Central Connecticut
- Positions: Defensive tackle, linebacker

Coaching career (HC unless noted)
- 1978–1984: New Rochelle HS (NY)
- 1985–1997: Iona

Administrative career (AD unless noted)
- 1998–2015: New Rochelle
- 2015–2021: Ramapo

Head coaching record
- Overall: 49–79–1 (college); 43–19–2 (high school)

Accomplishments and honors

Championships
- 1 MAAC (1993)

Awards
- LFC Coach of the Year (1989); MAAC Coach of the Year (1993); ECAC Coach of the Year (1993)

Harold Crocker is an American former football coach and college athletics administrator. He served as the head football coach at Iona College in New Rochelle, New York from 1985 to 1997, compiling a record of 49–79–1. Crocker was the athletic director at the College of New Rochelle from 1998 to 2015 and Ramapo College in Mahwah, New Jersey from 2015 to 2021.

Prior to his hiring at Iona, Crocker was the head football coach at New Rochelle High School from 1978 to 1984, tallying a mark of 43–19–2 in seven seasons.

== Head coaching record ==
=== College ===
Year	Team	Overall	Conference	Standing	Bowl/playoffs
Iona Gaels (Liberty Football Conference) (1985–1992)
1985	Iona	0–11	0–5	6th	
1986	Iona	0–11	0–5	6th	
1987	Iona	5–4	2–3	T–3rd	
1988	Iona	3–6	2–4	5th	
1989	Iona	8–2	4–1	2nd	
1990	Iona	5–5	2–3	4th	
1991	Iona	7–2–1	3–1–1	2nd	
1992	Iona	5–5	2–3	5th	
Iona Gaels (Metro Atlantic Athletic Conference) (1993–1997)
1993	Iona	9–2	5–0	1st	
1994	Iona	3–6	3–4	T–5th	
1995	Iona	3–6	3–4	T–5th	
1996	Iona	1–9	1–7	T–8th	
1997	Iona	0–10	0–8	9th	
Iona:		49–79–1	27–48		
Total:		49–79–1			
National championship Conference title Conference division title or championship game berth
