= 1994 Marist Red Foxes football team =

American college football season

1994 Marist Red Foxes football

MAAC co-champion
- Conference: Metro Atlantic Athletic Conference
- Record: 7–3 (6–1 MAAC)
- Head coach: Jim Parady (3rd season)
- Home stadium: Leonidoff Field

1994 Metro Atlantic Athletic Conference football standings
	Conf.					Overall
Team	W		L		T	W		L		T
St. John's +	6	–	1	–	0	10	–	1	–	0
Marist +	6	–	1	–	0	7	–	3	–	0
Duquesne	4	–	3	–	0	6	–	4	–	0
Georgetown	4	–	3	–	0	5	–	4	–	0
Iona	3	–	4	–	0	3	–	6	–	0
Siena	3	–	4	–	0	3	–	6	–	0
Canisius	2	–	5	–	0	2	–	8	–	0
Saint Peter's	0	–	7	–	0	0	–	9	–	0
+ – Conference co-champions

The 1994 Marist Red Foxes football team was an American football team that represented Marist College as a member of the Metro Atlantic Athletic Conference (MAAC) during the 1994 NCAA Division I-AA football season. Led by third-year head coach Jim Parady, the team compiled an overall record of 7–3, with a mark of 6–1 in conference play, and finished as MAAC co-champion.

== Schedule ==
Date	Opponent	Site	Result	Attendance	Source
September 10	Central Connecticut State*	Leonidoff Field; Poughkeepsie, NY	L 22–24		
September 17	Iona	Leonidoff Field; Poughkeepsie, NY	W 37–19	1,423	
September 24	at Wagner*	Fischer Memorial Stadium; Staten Island, NY	L 8–30	1,846	
October 1	St. John's	Leonidoff Field; Poughkeepsie, NY	W 32–13		
October 8	at Saint Peter's	JFK Stadium; Hoboken, NJ	W 33–0		
October 15	at Duquesne	Rooney Field; Pittsburgh, PA	W 16–7		
October 22	Canisius	Leonidoff Field; Poughkeepsie, NY	W 13–0		
October 29	at Georgetown	Kehoe Field; Washington, DC	L 12–35		
November 5	Saint Francis (PA)*	Leonidoff Field; Poughkeepsie, NY	W 39–16	1,576	
November 12	at Siena	Heritage Park; Colonie, NY	W 45–19		
*Non-conference game
