= 1994 Saint Francis Red Flash football team =

American college football season

1994 Saint Francis Red Flash football
- Conference: Independent
- Record: 2–7–1
- Head coach: Frank Pergolizzi (6th season)
- Home stadium: Pine Bowl

1994 NCAA Division I-AA independents football standings
	Conf.			Overall
Team	W	L	T	W		L		T
No. 1 Youngstown State ^		–		11	–	0	–	1
No. 23 Hofstra		–		8	–	1	–	1
Towson State		–		8	–	2	–	0
No. 10 Troy State ^		–		8	–	4	–	0
Robert Morris		–		7	–	1	–	1
Monmouth		–		7	–	2	–	0
Saint Mary's		–		7	–	3	–	0
UAB		–		7	–	4	–	0
No. 20 UCF		–		7	–	4	–	0
Wagner		–		6	–	5	–	0
Liberty		–		5	–	6	–	0
Western Kentucky		–		5	–	6	–	0
Central Connecticut State		–		4	–	6	–	0
Samford		–		4	–	6	–	1
Davidson		–		3	–	7	–	0
Buffalo		–		3	–	8	–	0
Saint Francis (PA)		–		2	–	7	–	1
Charleston Southern		–		0	–	11	–	0
^ – NCAA Division I-AA playoff participant; Rankings from The Sports Network poll

The 1994 Saint Francis Red Flash football team represented Saint Francis College (now known as Saint Francis University) as an independent during the 1994 NCAA Division I-AA football season. Led by sixth-year head coach Frank Pergolizzi, the Red Flash compiled an overall record of 2–7–1.

== Schedule ==
Date	Opponent	Site	Result	Attendance	Source
September 3	at Gannon	Erie, PA	L 0–21		
September 10	at Duquesne	Arthur J. Rooney Athletic Field; Pittsburgh, PA	L 3–7		
September 17	Sacred Heart	Pine Bowl; Loretto, PA	L 13–22	675	
September 24	Bethany (WV)	Pine Bowl; Loretto, PA	W 45–20		
October 1	Mercyhurst	Pine Bowl; Loretto, PA	W 27–7		
October 8	at Monmouth	Kessler Field; West Long Branch, NJ	L 7–29		
October 22	at Central Connecticut State	Arute Field; New Britain, CT	L 21–24		
October 29	Robert Morris	Pine Bowl; Loretto, PA	T 14–14	1,178	
November 5	at Marist	Leonidoff Field; Poughkeepsie, NY	L 16–39	1,576	
November 12	Wagner	Pine Bowl; Loretto, PA	L 13–35		
