= 1994 Central Connecticut State Blue Devils football team =

American college football season

1994 Central Connecticut State Blue Devils football
- Conference: Independent
- Record: 4–6
- Head coach: Sal Cintorino (3rd season)
- Home stadium: Arute Field

1994 NCAA Division I-AA independents football standings
	Conf.			Overall
Team	W	L	T	W		L		T
No. 1 Youngstown State ^		–		11	–	0	–	1
No. 23 Hofstra		–		8	–	1	–	1
Towson State		–		8	–	2	–	0
No. 10 Troy State ^		–		8	–	4	–	0
Robert Morris		–		7	–	1	–	1
Monmouth		–		7	–	2	–	0
Saint Mary's		–		7	–	3	–	0
UAB		–		7	–	4	–	0
No. 20 UCF		–		7	–	4	–	0
Wagner		–		6	–	5	–	0
Liberty		–		5	–	6	–	0
Western Kentucky		–		5	–	6	–	0
Central Connecticut State		–		4	–	6	–	0
Samford		–		4	–	6	–	1
Davidson		–		3	–	7	–	0
Buffalo		–		3	–	8	–	0
Saint Francis (PA)		–		2	–	7	–	1
Charleston Southern		–		0	–	11	–	0
^ – NCAA Division I-AA playoff participant; Rankings from The Sports Network poll

The 1994 Central Connecticut State Blue Devils football team was an American football team that represented Central Connecticut State University as an independent during the 1994 NCAA Division I-AA football season. Led by third-year head coach Sal Cintorino, the team compiled a 4–6 record.

== Schedule ==
Date	Opponent	Site	Result	Attendance	Source
September 10	at Marist	Leonidoff Field; Poughkeepsie, NY	W 24–22		
September 17	Robert Morris	Arute Field; New Britain, CT	L 17–24	2,745	
September 24	at C. W. Post	Hickox Field; Brookville, NY	L 14–42		
October 1	at Saint Peter's	JFK Stadium; Hoboken, NJ	W 36–23		
October 7	at Hofstra	Hofstra Stadium; Hempstead, NY	L 7–62	3,827	
October 15	at Springfield	Benedum Field; Springfield, MA	W 24–20		
October 22	Saint Francis (PA)	Arute Field; New Britain, CT	W 24–21		
October 29	Wagner	Arute Field; New Britain, CT	L 21–28		
November 5	Southern Connecticut State	Arute Field; New Britain, CT	L 7–35	1,740	
November 12	Monmouth	Arute Field; New Britain, CT	L 13–14		
