= 1994 St. John's Red Storm football team =

American college football season

1994 St. John's Red Storm football

MAAC co-champion

ECAC–Division I-AA Bowl, W 34–14 vs. Wagner
- Conference: Metro Atlantic Athletic Conference
- Record: 10–1 (6–1 MAAC)
- Head coach: Bob Ricca (17th season)
- Home stadium: DaSilva Memorial Field

1994 Metro Atlantic Athletic Conference football standings
	Conf.					Overall
Team	W		L		T	W		L		T
St. John's +	6	–	1	–	0	10	–	1	–	0
Marist +	6	–	1	–	0	7	–	3	–	0
Duquesne	4	–	3	–	0	6	–	4	–	0
Georgetown	4	–	3	–	0	5	–	4	–	0
Iona	3	–	4	–	0	3	–	6	–	0
Siena	3	–	4	–	0	3	–	6	–	0
Canisius	2	–	5	–	0	2	–	8	–	0
Saint Peter's	0	–	7	–	0	0	–	9	–	0
+ – Conference co-champions

The 1994 St. John's Red Storm football team was an American football team that represented St. John's University as a member of the Metro Atlantic Athletic Conference (MAAC) during the 1994 NCAA Division I-AA football season. In their 17th year under head coach Bob Ricca, the team compiled an overall record of 10–1, with a mark of 6–1 in conference play, and finished as MAAC co-champion.

== Schedule ==
Date	Opponent	Site	Result	Attendance	Source
September 10	at Sacred Heart*	Campus Field; Fairfield, CT	W 6–3		
September 23	Monmouth*	DaSilva Memorial Field; Queens, NY	W 38–18	1,330	
October 1	at Marist	Leonidoff Field; Poughkeepsie, NY	L 13–32		
October 7	Georgetown	DaSilva Memorial Field; Queens, NY	W 19–16	1,357	
October 15	at Canisius	Demske Sports Complex; Buffalo, NY	W 34–22	773	
October 22	at Saint Peter's	JFK Stadium; Hoboken, NJ	W 27–7		
October 29	Siena	DaSilva Memorial Field; Queens, NY	W 24–8		
November 5	Duquesne	DaSilva Memorial Field; Queens, NY	W 24–7		
November 12	at Iona	Mazzella Field; New Rochelle, NY	W 21–7		
November 19	Wagner*	DaSilva Memorial Field; Queens, NY (ECAC Division I-AA Bowl)	W 34–14		
November 24	Pace*	DaSilva Memorial Field; Queens, NY	W 20–13	1,086	
*Non-conference game
