= 1994 Monmouth Hawks football team =

American college football season

1994 Monmouth Hawks football
- Conference: Independent
- Record: 7–2
- Head coach: Kevin Callahan (2nd season)
- Offensive coordinator: Terry Dow (2nd season)
- Offensive scheme: Multiple
- Defensive coordinator: Andy Bobik (2nd season)
- Base defense: 4–3
- Home stadium: Kessler Field

1994 NCAA Division I-AA independents football standings
	Conf.			Overall
Team	W	L	T	W		L		T
No. 1 Youngstown State ^		–		11	–	0	–	1
No. 23 Hofstra		–		8	–	1	–	1
Towson State		–		8	–	2	–	0
No. 10 Troy State ^		–		8	–	4	–	0
Robert Morris		–		7	–	1	–	1
Monmouth		–		7	–	2	–	0
Saint Mary's		–		7	–	3	–	0
UAB		–		7	–	4	–	0
No. 20 UCF		–		7	–	4	–	0
Wagner		–		6	–	5	–	0
Liberty		–		5	–	6	–	0
Western Kentucky		–		5	–	6	–	0
Central Connecticut State		–		4	–	6	–	0
Samford		–		4	–	6	–	1
Davidson		–		3	–	7	–	0
Buffalo		–		3	–	8	–	0
Saint Francis (PA)		–		2	–	7	–	1
Charleston Southern		–		0	–	11	–	0
^ – NCAA Division I-AA playoff participant; Rankings from The Sports Network poll

The 1994 Monmouth Hawks football team represented Monmouth University in the 1994 NCAA Division I-AA football season as an independent. This year was the team's first season as an NCAA Division I-AA independent program. The Hawks were led by second-year head coach Kevin Callahan and played their home games at Kessler Field. They finished the season with a record of 7–2.

== Schedule ==
Date	Opponent	Site	Result	Attendance	Source
September 10	at Robert Morris	Moon Stadium; Moon Township	L 19–26	5,335	
September 17	Pace	Kessler Field; West Long Branch, NJ	W 20–0	4,123	
September 23	at St. John's	DaSilva Memorial Field; Queens, NY	L 18–38	1,330	
October 1	at Wagner	Fischer Memorial Stadium; Staten Island, NY	W 22–14		
October 8	Saint Francis (PA)	Kessler Field; West Long Branch, NJ	W 29–7		
October 15	Western New England	Kessler Field; West Long Branch, NJ	W 36–0		
October 29	at Sacred Heart	Campus Field; Fairfield, CT	W 32–13		
November 5	Stonehill	Kessler Field; West Long Branch, NJ	W 12–0	5,784	
November 12	at Central Connecticut State	Arute Field; New Britain, CT	W 14–13		
