= 1994 Siena Saints football team =

American college football season

1994 Siena Saints football
- Conference: Metro Atlantic Athletic Conference
- Record: 3–6 (3–4 MAAC)
- Head coach: Jack DuBois (13th season)
- Home stadium: Heritage Park

1994 Metro Atlantic Athletic Conference football standings
	Conf.					Overall
Team	W		L		T	W		L		T
St. John's +	6	–	1	–	0	10	–	1	–	0
Marist +	6	–	1	–	0	7	–	3	–	0
Duquesne	4	–	3	–	0	6	–	4	–	0
Georgetown	4	–	3	–	0	5	–	4	–	0
Iona	3	–	4	–	0	3	–	6	–	0
Siena	3	–	4	–	0	3	–	6	–	0
Canisius	2	–	5	–	0	2	–	8	–	0
Saint Peter's	0	–	7	–	0	0	–	9	–	0
+ – Conference co-champions

The 1994 Siena Saints football team was an American football team that represented Siena College as a member of the Metro Atlantic Athletic Conference (MAAC) during the 1994 NCAA Division I-AA football season. In their 13th year under head coach Jack DuBois, the team compiled an overall record of 3–6, with a mark of 3–4 in conference play, and finished tied for fifth in the MAAC.

== Schedule ==
Date	Opponent	Site	Result	Source
September 24	at Saint Peter's	JFK Stadium; Hoboken, NJ	W 22–23 (forfeit win)	
September 24	at Canisius	Demske Sports Complex; Buffalo, NY	L 7–28	
October 1	at Iona	Mazzella Field; New Rochelle, NY	W 38–21	
October 8	RPI*	Heritage Park; Colonie, NY	L 7–34	
October 15	Bentley*	Heritage Park; Colonie, NY	L 6–39	
October 22	Duquesne	Heritage Park; Colonie, NY	W 21–16	
October 29	at St. John's	DaSilva Memorial Field; Queens, NY	L 8–24	
November 5	Georgetown	Heritage Park; Colonie, NY	L 18–19	
November 12	Marist	Heritage Park; Colonie, NY	L 19–45	
*Non-conference game
