= 1994 Samford Bulldogs football team =

American college football season

1994 Samford Bulldogs football
- Conference: Independent
- Record: 4–6–1
- Head coach: Pete Hurt (1st season)
- Offensive coordinator: Roger Carr (1st season)
- Defensive coordinator: Pete Hurt (2nd season)
- Home stadium: Seibert Stadium

1994 NCAA Division I-AA independents football standings
	Conf.			Overall
Team	W	L	T	W		L		T
No. 1 Youngstown State ^		–		11	–	0	–	1
No. 23 Hofstra		–		8	–	1	–	1
Towson State		–		8	–	2	–	0
No. 10 Troy State ^		–		8	–	4	–	0
Robert Morris		–		7	–	1	–	1
Monmouth		–		7	–	2	–	0
Saint Mary's		–		7	–	3	–	0
UAB		–		7	–	4	–	0
No. 20 UCF		–		7	–	4	–	0
Wagner		–		6	–	5	–	0
Liberty		–		5	–	6	–	0
Western Kentucky		–		5	–	6	–	0
Central Connecticut State		–		4	–	6	–	0
Samford		–		4	–	6	–	1
Davidson		–		3	–	7	–	0
Buffalo		–		3	–	8	–	0
Saint Francis (PA)		–		2	–	7	–	1
Charleston Southern		–		0	–	11	–	0
^ – NCAA Division I-AA playoff participant; Rankings from The Sports Network poll

The 1994 Samford Bulldogs football team represented Samford University as an independent during the 1994 NCAA Division I-AA football season. Led by first-year head coach Pete Hurt, the Bulldogs compiled an overall record of 4–6–1.

== Schedule ==
Date	Opponent	Site	Result	Attendance	Source
September 3	Bethel (TN)	Seibert Stadium; Homewood, AL	W 28–6		
September 10	at No. 21 Eastern Kentucky	Roy Kidd Stadium; Richmond, KY	L 16–50	14,600	
September 17	at No. 18 Tennessee Tech	Tucker Stadium; Cookeville, TN	L 7–20	3,200	
October 1	Nicholls State	Seibert Stadium; Homewood, AL	L 6–24	5,128	
October 8	No. 6 UCF	Seibert Stadium; Homewood, AL	W 36–35	3,632	
October 15	Mississippi College	Seibert Stadium; Homewood, AL	L 12–20		
October 22	at Southern Miss	M. M. Roberts Stadium; Hattiesburg, MS	L 16–59	15,514	
October 29	No. 18 Alcorn State	Seibert Stadium; Homewood, AL	T 45–45	11,189	
November 5	at Morgan State	Hughes Stadium; Baltimore, MD	W 40–34		
November 12	Austin Peay	Seibert Stadium; Homewood, AL	W 43–36		
November 17	at No. 12 Troy State	Veterans Memorial Stadium; Troy, AL	L 26–30		
Rankings from The Sports Network Poll released prior to the game
