= 1994 Charleston Southern Buccaneers football team =

American college football season

1994 Charleston Southern Buccaneers football
- Conference: Independent
- Record: 0–11
- Head coach: David Dowd (4th season)
- Home stadium: Buccaneer Field

1994 NCAA Division I-AA independents football standings
	Conf.			Overall
Team	W	L	T	W		L		T
No. 1 Youngstown State ^		–		11	–	0	–	1
No. 23 Hofstra		–		8	–	1	–	1
Towson State		–		8	–	2	–	0
No. 10 Troy State ^		–		8	–	4	–	0
Robert Morris		–		7	–	1	–	1
Monmouth		–		7	–	2	–	0
Saint Mary's		–		7	–	3	–	0
UAB		–		7	–	4	–	0
No. 20 UCF		–		7	–	4	–	0
Wagner		–		6	–	5	–	0
Liberty		–		5	–	6	–	0
Western Kentucky		–		5	–	6	–	0
Central Connecticut State		–		4	–	6	–	0
Samford		–		4	–	6	–	1
Davidson		–		3	–	7	–	0
Buffalo		–		3	–	8	–	0
Saint Francis (PA)		–		2	–	7	–	1
Charleston Southern		–		0	–	11	–	0
^ – NCAA Division I-AA playoff participant; Rankings from The Sports Network poll

The 1994 Charleston Southern Buccaneers football team represented Charleston Southern University as an independent during the 1994 NCAA Division I-AA football season. Led by fourth-year head coach David Dowd, the Buccaneers compiled a record of 0–11. Charleston Southern played home games at Buccaneer Field in North Charleston, South Carolina.

== Schedule ==
Date	Opponent	Site	Result	Attendance	Source
September 10	at Presbyterian	Bailey Stadium; Clinton, SC	L 34–38		
September 17	South Carolina State	Buccaneer Field; North Charleston, SC	L 0–37		
September 24	Towson State	Buccaneer Field; North Charleston, SC	L 0–51	1,110	
October 1	Morgan State	Buccaneer Field; North Charleston, SC	L 29–31	1,406	
October 8	Newberry	Buccaneer Field; North Charleston, SC	L 19–50	1,293	
October 15	at No. 6 Troy State	Veterans Memorial Stadium; Troy, AL	L 20–55		
October 22	at UAB	Legion Field; Birmingham, AL	L 14–54	20,237	
October 29	Mars Hill	Buccaneer Field; North Charleston, SC	L 28–45		
November 5	at Tennessee–Martin	Pacer Stadium; Martin, TN	L 14–42	2,289	
November 12	at Wofford	Snyder Field; Spartanburg, SC	L 33–54		
November 19	at Liberty	Williams Stadium; Lynchburg, VA	L 27–59		
Rankings from The Sports Network Poll released prior to the game
