= 1994 Saint Mary's Gaels football team =

American college football season

1994 Saint Mary's Gaels football
- Conference: Independent
- Record: 7–3
- Head coach: Mike Rasmussen (5th season)
- Home stadium: Saint Mary's Stadium

1994 NCAA Division I-AA independents football standings
	Conf.			Overall
Team	W	L	T	W		L		T
No. 1 Youngstown State ^		–		11	–	0	–	1
No. 23 Hofstra		–		8	–	1	–	1
Towson State		–		8	–	2	–	0
No. 10 Troy State ^		–		8	–	4	–	0
Robert Morris		–		7	–	1	–	1
Monmouth		–		7	–	2	–	0
Saint Mary's		–		7	–	3	–	0
UAB		–		7	–	4	–	0
No. 20 UCF		–		7	–	4	–	0
Wagner		–		6	–	5	–	0
Liberty		–		5	–	6	–	0
Western Kentucky		–		5	–	6	–	0
Central Connecticut State		–		4	–	6	–	0
Samford		–		4	–	6	–	1
Davidson		–		3	–	7	–	0
Buffalo		–		3	–	8	–	0
Saint Francis (PA)		–		2	–	7	–	1
Charleston Southern		–		0	–	11	–	0
^ – NCAA Division I-AA playoff participant; Rankings from The Sports Network poll

The 1994 Saint Mary's Gaels football team was an American football team that represented Saint Mary's College of California as an independent during the 1994 NCAA Division I-AA football season. Led by fifth-year head coach Mike Rasmussen, the team compiled a 7–3 record.

== Schedule ==
Date	Opponent	Site	Result	Attendance	Source
September 3	San Francisco State	Saint Mary’s Stadium; Moraga, CA	W 24–0	1,652	
September 10	at San Diego	Torero Stadium; San Diego, CA	W 52–21		
September 17	Sonoma State	Saint Mary's Stadium; Moraga, CA	W 45–21	1,505	
September 24	at UC Davis	Toomey Field; Davis, CA	L 0–13	6,600	
October 1	Humboldt State	Saint Mary's Stadium; Moraga, CA	W 27–22		
October 8	at Chico State	University Stadium; Chico, CA	W 34–17	5,203	
October 15	Cal State Northridge	Saint Mary's Stadium; Moraga, CA	W 20–10	3,070	
October 22	at Southern Utah	Coliseum of Southern Utah; Cedar City, UT	L 13–28	1,483	
October 29	at Cal Poly	Mustang Stadium; San Luis Obispo, CA	L 20–34		
November 5	Sacramento State	Saint Mary's Stadium; Moraga, CA	W 14–12	1,345	
