= 1994 Robert Morris Colonials football team =

American college football season

1994 Robert Morris Colonials football
- Conference: Independent
- Record: 7–1–1
- Head coach: Joe Walton (1st season)
- Defensive coordinator: Dan Radakovich (1st season)
- Home stadium: Moon Stadium

1994 NCAA Division I-AA independents football standings
	Conf.			Overall
Team	W	L	T	W		L		T
No. 1 Youngstown State ^		–		11	–	0	–	1
No. 23 Hofstra		–		8	–	1	–	1
Towson State		–		8	–	2	–	0
No. 10 Troy State ^		–		8	–	4	–	0
Robert Morris		–		7	–	1	–	1
Monmouth		–		7	–	2	–	0
Saint Mary's		–		7	–	3	–	0
UAB		–		7	–	4	–	0
No. 20 UCF		–		7	–	4	–	0
Wagner		–		6	–	5	–	0
Liberty		–		5	–	6	–	0
Western Kentucky		–		5	–	6	–	0
Central Connecticut State		–		4	–	6	–	0
Samford		–		4	–	6	–	1
Davidson		–		3	–	7	–	0
Buffalo		–		3	–	8	–	0
Saint Francis (PA)		–		2	–	7	–	1
Charleston Southern		–		0	–	11	–	0
^ – NCAA Division I-AA playoff participant; Rankings from The Sports Network poll

The 1994 Robert Morris Colonials football team represented Robert Morris College, now Robert Morris University, as an independent during the 1994 NCAA Division I-AA football season. The Colonials were led by head coach Joe Walton during their inaugural season, and played their home games at Moon Stadium on the campus of Moon Area High School.

== Schedule ==
Date	Opponent	Site	Result	Attendance	Source
September 3	at Waynesburg	College Field; Waynesburg, PA	W 24–19	2,275	
September 10	Monmouth	Moon Stadium; Moon Township, PA	W 26–19	5,335	
September 17	at Central Connecticut State	Arute Field; New Britain, CT	W 24–17	2,745	
September 24	Gannon	Moon Stadium; Moon Township, PA	W 28–0	3,330	
October 8	Duquesne	Moon Stadium; Moon Township, PA	W 28–6	8,016	
October 15	at Wagner	Wagner College Stadium; Staten Island, NY	L 21–38	5,346	
October 29	at Saint Francis	Pine Bowl; Loretto, PA	T 14–14	1,178	
November 5	Bethany (WV)	Moon Stadium; Moon Township, PA	W 38–14	4,102	
November 12	at Mercyhurst	Erie Veterans Memorial Stadium; Erie, PA	W 37–27	1,001	
