= 1994 Georgetown Hoyas football team =

American college football season

1994 Georgetown Hoyas football
- Conference: Metro Atlantic Athletic Conference
- Record: 5–4 (4–3 MAAC)
- Head coach: Bob Benson (2nd season)
- Home stadium: Kehoe Field

1994 Metro Atlantic Athletic Conference football standings
	Conf.					Overall
Team	W		L		T	W		L		T
St. John's +	6	–	1	–	0	10	–	1	–	0
Marist +	6	–	1	–	0	7	–	3	–	0
Duquesne	4	–	3	–	0	6	–	4	–	0
Georgetown	4	–	3	–	0	5	–	4	–	0
Iona	3	–	4	–	0	3	–	6	–	0
Siena	3	–	4	–	0	3	–	6	–	0
Canisius	2	–	5	–	0	2	–	8	–	0
Saint Peter's	0	–	7	–	0	0	–	9	–	0
+ – Conference co-champions

The 1994 Georgetown Hoyas football team was an American football team that represented Georgetown University as a member of the Metro Atlantic Athletic Conference (MAAC) during the 1994 NCAA Division I-AA football season. In their second year under head coach Bob Benson, the team compiled an overall record of 5–4, with a mark of 4–3 in conference play, and finished tied for third in the MAAC.

== Schedule ==
Date	Opponent	Site	Result	Attendance	Source
September 17	at Duquesne	Arthur J. Rooney Athletic Field; Pittsburgh, PA	L 0–3		
September 24	Iona	Kehoe Field; Washington, DC	L 28–31	1,837	
October 1	Canisius	Kehoe Field; Washington, DC	W 21–14	2,021	
October 7	at St. John's	DaSilva Memorial Field; Queens, NY	L 16–19	1,357	
October 15	at Franklin & Marshall*	Williamson Field; Lancaster, PA	L 7–14		
October 22	Johns Hopkins*	Kehoe Field; Washington, DC	W 17–14	2,174	
October 29	Marist	Kehoe Field; Washington, DC	W 35–12		
November 5	at Siena	Heritage Park; Colonie, NY	W 19–18		
November 12	Saint Peter's	Kehoe Field; Washington, DC	W 41–7		
*Non-conference game
