= 1994 Liberty Flames football team =

American college football season

1994 Liberty Flames football
- Conference: Independent
- Record: 5–6
- Head coach: Sam Rutigliano (6th season)
- Home stadium: Williams Stadium

1994 NCAA Division I-AA independents football standings
	Conf.			Overall
Team	W	L	T	W		L		T
No. 1 Youngstown State ^		–		11	–	0	–	1
No. 23 Hofstra		–		8	–	1	–	1
Towson State		–		8	–	2	–	0
No. 10 Troy State ^		–		8	–	4	–	0
Robert Morris		–		7	–	1	–	1
Monmouth		–		7	–	2	–	0
Saint Mary's		–		7	–	3	–	0
UAB		–		7	–	4	–	0
No. 20 UCF		–		7	–	4	–	0
Wagner		–		6	–	5	–	0
Liberty		–		5	–	6	–	0
Western Kentucky		–		5	–	6	–	0
Central Connecticut State		–		4	–	6	–	0
Samford		–		4	–	6	–	1
Davidson		–		3	–	7	–	0
Buffalo		–		3	–	8	–	0
Saint Francis (PA)		–		2	–	7	–	1
Charleston Southern		–		0	–	11	–	0
^ – NCAA Division I-AA playoff participant; Rankings from The Sports Network poll

The 1994 Liberty Flames football team represented Liberty University as an independent during the 1994 NCAA Division I-AA football season. Led by sixth-year head coach Sam Rutigliano, the Flames compiled an overall record of 5–6.

== Schedule ==
Date	Opponent	Site	Result	Attendance	Source
September 3	Concord	Williams Stadium; Lynchburg, VA	W 52–0	12,016	
September 9	at Villanova	Villanova Stadium; Villanova, PA	L 13–16	11,256	
September 17	at Toledo	Glass Bowl; Toledo, OH	L 37–47	19,910	
September 24	at Boise State	Bronco Stadium; Boise, ID	L 7–35	21,584	
October 8	Delaware State	Williams Stadium; Lynchburg, VA	L 17–22		
October 15	at Southwest Missouri State	Plaster Sports Complex; Springfield, MO	W 27–19	9,169	
October 22	Catawba	Williams Stadium; Lynchburg, VA	W 37–12		
October 29	No. 17 UCF	Williams Stadium; Lynchburg, VA	L 24–49	6,153	
November 5	at No. 13 Appalachian State	Kidd Brewer Stadium; Boone, NC	L 40–41	19,468	
November 12	No. 7 (D-II) New Haven	Williams Stadium; Lynchburg, VA	W 40–22		
November 19	Charleston Southern	Williams Stadium; Lynchburg, VA	W 59–27		
Rankings from NCAA Division I-AA Football Committee Poll released prior to the game
