= Frank Pergolizzi =

American college athletic administrator and former coach

Biographical details
- Education: Williams (MA) (B.A.); Western Michigan (M.A.)

Coaching career (HC unless noted)
- 1989–1994: Saint Francis (PA)

Administrative career (AD unless noted)
- 1995–1998: Saint Francis (PA)
- 1998–2000: East Tennessee State
- 2000–2007: Southeastern Louisiana
- 2009–2013: West Virginia Tech
- 2013–2023: Husson

Head coaching record
- Overall: 25–33–2
- Bowls: 0–1

Accomplishments and honors

Championships
- 1 ACFC (1991)

Frank Pergolizzi is an American college athletic administrator director and former American football coach. He was the athletic director at Husson College in Bangor, Maine, from 2013 until his retirement in 2023. Pergolizzi served as the head football coach at Saint Francis University in Loretto, Pennsylvania from 1989 to 1994, compiling a record of 25–33–2. After retiring from coaching, he embarked on a career in collegiate sports administration, serving as the athletic director at Saint Francis from 1995 to 1998, East Tennessee State University from 1998 to 2000, Southeastern Louisiana University from 2000 to 2007, and West Virginia University Institute of Technology from 2009 to 2013.

== Head coaching record ==
Year	Team	Overall	Conference	Standing	Bowl/playoffs
Saint Francis Red Flash (NCAA Division I-AA independent) (1989–1991)
1989	Saint Francis	2–8	2–3	T–4th	
1990	Saint Francis	4–6	4–1	2nd	
1991	Saint Francis	6–3	3–0	1st	
Saint Francis Red Flash (NCAA Division III independent) (1992)
1992	Saint Francis	8–2–1			L ECAC Southeast Bowl
Saint Francis Red Flash (NCAA Division I-AA independent) (1993–1994)
1993	Saint Francis	3–7			
1994	Saint Francis	2–7–1			
Saint Francis:		25–33–2	9–4		
Total:		25–33–2			
National championship Conference title Conference division title or championship game berth
