= Sal Cintorino =

American football player and coach

Biographical details
- Born: c. 1961

Playing career
- 1983–1985: Central Connecticut
- Position: Linebacker

Coaching career (HC unless noted)
- 1986–1991: Central Connecticut (assistant)
- 1992–2000: Central Connecticut
- 2003–2007: Newington HS (CT)
- 2009–2013: Bristol Central HS (CT)
- 2014: Canton HS (CT) (OC)
- 2015: Bristol Eastern HS (CT) (OC)
- 2016–2017: Avon HS (CT)

Head coaching record
- Overall: 33–56 (college)

Sal Cintorino (born c. 1961) is an American football coach. Cintorino was the ninth head football coach at Central Connecticut State University in New Britain, Connecticut, serving for nine seasons, from 1992 to 2000, and compiling a record of 33–56.

== Head coaching record ==
=== College ===
Year	Team	Overall	Conference	Standing	Bowl/playoffs
Central Connecticut Blue Devils (NCAA Division II independent) (1992)
1992	Central Connecticut	1–8			
Central Connecticut Blue Devils (NCAA Division I-AA independent) (1993–1995)
1993	Central Connecticut	5–5			
1994	Central Connecticut	4–6			
1995	Central Connecticut	3–7			
Central Connecticut Blue Devils (Northeast Conference) (1996–2000)
1996	Central Connecticut	3–7	2–2	T–3rd	
1997	Central Connecticut	5–5	1–3	4th	
1998	Central Connecticut	4–6	3–2	T–3rd	
1999	Central Connecticut	4–6	3–4	5th	
2000	Central Connecticut	4–6	3–5	6th	
Central Connecticut:		33–56	12–16		
Total:		33–56			
