= Barry Mynter =

American football coach (1936–2020)

Biographical details
- Born: September 16, 1936; Hudson, New York, U.S.
- Died: May 23, 2020 (aged 83); Northfield, Vermont, U.S.
- Education: St. Lawrence University

Coaching career (HC unless noted)
- 1965–1974: Norwich (DC)
- 1975–1990: Norwich
- 1992–1994: Canisius

Head coaching record
- Overall: 85–97–3

Accomplishments and honors

Awards
- Norwich University Athletics Hall of Fame inductee (1990)

Barry Walch Mynter (September 16, 1936 – May 23, 2020) was an American football coach who served as head football coach at Norwich University and Canisius College.

After graduating from St. Lawrence University in 1958, Mynter spent ten years as an assistant football coach at Norwich University from 1965 to 1974. Mynter was named head football coach at Norwich for the 1975 season. He served sixteen years as Norwich's head coach from 1975 to 1990, compiling a record of 75–78–2. Mynter was elected to the Norwich University Athletics Hall of Fame in 1990.

In 1992, Mynter was named head football coach at Canisius College. His tenure at Canisius was less successful, however, as he served as head coach at Canisius from 1992 to 1994, compiling a record of 10–19–1. Mynter resigned as head coach at Canisius following the 1994 season, a season in which the Golden Griffins tied the school record for most losses in a season, finishing just 2–8 on the year.

Mynter died on May 23, 2020, at the age of 83.

== Head coaching record ==
Year	Team	Overall	Conference	Standing	Bowl/playoffs
Norwich Cadets (NCAA Division III independent) (1975–1990)
1975	Norwich	4–5			
1976	Norwich	6–3			
1977	Norwich	7–2			
1978	Norwich	5–4			
1979	Norwich	8–2			
1980	Norwich	4–6			
1981	Norwich	3–7			
1982	Norwich	6–4			
1983	Norwich	5–5			
1984	Norwich	9–2			
1985	Norwich	5–5			
1986	Norwich	2–8			
1987	Norwich	4–4–1			
1988	Norwich	4–6			
1989	Norwich	2–7–1			
1990	Norwich	1–8			
Norwich:		75–78–2			
Canisius Golden Griffins (NCAA Division III independent) (1992)
1992	Canisius	3–6–1			
Canisius Golden Griffins (Metro Atlantic Athletic Conference) (1993–1994)
1993	Canisius	5–5	4–1	2nd	
1994	Canisius	2–8	2–5	7th	
Canisius:		10–19–1	6–6		
Total:		85–97–3			
