= 1994 Duquesne Dukes football team =

American college football season

1994 Duquesne Dukes football
- Conference: Metro Atlantic Athletic Conference
- Record: 6–4 (4–3 MAAC)
- Head coach: Greg Gattuso (2nd season)
- Home stadium: Arthur J. Rooney Athletic Field

1994 Metro Atlantic Athletic Conference football standings
	Conf.					Overall
Team	W		L		T	W		L		T
St. John's +	6	–	1	–	0	10	–	1	–	0
Marist +	6	–	1	–	0	7	–	3	–	0
Duquesne	4	–	3	–	0	6	–	4	–	0
Georgetown	4	–	3	–	0	5	–	4	–	0
Iona	3	–	4	–	0	3	–	6	–	0
Siena	3	–	4	–	0	3	–	6	–	0
Canisius	2	–	5	–	0	2	–	8	–	0
Saint Peter's	0	–	7	–	0	0	–	9	–	0
+ – Conference co-champions

The 1994 Duquesne Dukes football team represented Duquesne University as a member of the Metro Atlantic Athletic Conference (MAAC) during the 1994 NCAA Division I-AA football season. Led by second-year head coach Greg Gattuso, the team compiled an overall record of 6–4, with a mark of 4–3 in conference play, and finished tied for third in the MAAC.

== Schedule ==
Date	Opponent	Site	Result	Attendance	Source
September 10	Saint Francis (PA)*	Arthur J. Rooney Athletic Field; Pittsburgh, PA	W 7–4		
September 17	Georgetown	Arthur J. Rooney Athletic Field; Pittsburgh, PA	W 3–0		
September 24	at Saint Peter's	JFK Stadium; Hoboken, NJ	W 40–21		
October 1	Gannon*	Arthur J. Rooney Athletic Field; Pittsburgh, PA	W 22–16	4,702	
October 8	at Robert Morris*	Moon Stadium; Moon Township, PA	L 6–28	8,016	
October 15	Marist	Arthur J. Rooney Athletic Field; Pittsburgh, PA	L 7–16		
October 22	at Siena	Heritage Park; Colonie, NY	L 16–21		
October 29	Iona	Arthur J. Rooney Athletic Field; Pittsburgh, PA	W 16–12		
November 5	at St. John's	DaSilva Memorial Field; Queens, NY	L 7–24		
November 12	at Canisius	Demske Sports Complex; Buffalo, NY	W 14–0	764	
*Non-conference game
