= Mike Rasmussen =

American football coach (born 1950)

Biographical details
- Born: June 18, 1950 (age 76); Decatur, Illinois, U.S.
- Education: Michigan State University (1972)

Playing career
- 1968–1969: Fresno City
- 1970–1971: Michigan State
- 1972–1973: Lansing All Stars
- Position: Quarterback

Coaching career (HC unless noted)
- 1972–1973: Michigan State (GA)
- 1974: Chico State (OC)
- 1975–1976: Hawaii (QB/WR)
- 1977–1978: Bowling Green (OC)
- 1979–1980: Bowling Green (OC/WR)
- 1981–1983: Fresno State (RB)
- 1984–1986: California (QB/WR)
- 1987: Saint Mary's (DB)
- 1988–1989: Saint Mary's (OC/QB)
- 1990–1999: Saint Mary's
- 2001–2019: Monterey Peninsula

Head coaching record
- Overall: 54–46–1 (college); 115–83 (junior college)
- Bowls: 3–5 (junior college)

Accomplishments and honors

Championships
- 5 Coast Conference (2004, 2006, 2008, 2011–2012); 2 AGCL (2016–2017)

Michael Rasmussen (born June 18, 1950) is an American former college football coach. He was the head football coach for Saint Mary's College of California from 1990 to 1999 and Monterey Peninsula College from 2001 to 2019. He also coached for Michigan State, Chico State, Hawaii, Bowling Green, Fresno State, California, Saint Mary's (CA). He played college football for Fresno City and Michigan State as a quarterback. He played semi-professionally for the Lansing All Stars of the Midwest Football League (MFL) following his graduation.

== Head coaching record ==
=== College ===
| Year | Team | Overall | Conference | Standing | Bowl/playoffs |
|---|---|---|---|---|---|
Saint Mary's Gaels (NCAA Division II independent) (1990–1992)
| 1990 | Saint Mary's | 7–3 | | | |
| 1991 | Saint Mary's | 6–5 | | | |
| 1992 | Saint Mary's | 5–4 | | | |
Saint Mary's Gaels (NCAA Division I-AA independent) (1993–1999)
| 1993 | Saint Mary's | 6–3–1 | | | |
| 1994 | Saint Mary's | 7–3 | | | |
| 1995 | Saint Mary's | 8–2 | | | |
| 1996 | Saint Mary's | 7–3 | | | |
| 1997 | Saint Mary's | 4–6 | | | |
| 1998 | Saint Mary's | 2–8 | | | |
| 1999 | Saint Mary's | 2–9 | | | |
| Saint Mary's: | | 54–46–1 | | | |
| Total: | | 54–46–1 | | | |

=== Junior college ===
| Year | Team | Overall | Conference | Standing | Bowl/playoffs | CCCAA^{#} |
|---|---|---|---|---|---|---|
Monterey Peninsula Lobos (Coast Conference) (2001–2013)
| 2001 | Monterey Peninsula | 4–6 | 1–4 | T–4th | | |
| 2002 | Monterey Peninsula | 1–9 | 1–3 | T–4th | | |
| 2003 | Monterey Peninsula | 1–9 | 0–4 | 5th | | |
| 2004 | Monterey Peninsula | 10–1 | 5–0 | 1st | W Graffiti Bowl | 15 |
| 2005 | Monterey Peninsula | 7–3 | 3–2 | T–2nd | | |
| 2006 | Monterey Peninsula | 9–2 | 3–1 | T–1st | L Holiday Bowl | |
| 2007 | Monterey Peninsula | 8–2 | 3–1 | 2nd | | |
| 2008 | Monterey Peninsula | 10–1 | 5–0 | 1st | L Bulldog Bowl | |
| 2009 | Monterey Peninsula | 3–7 | 1–4 | 5th | | |
| 2010 | Monterey Peninsula | 5–5 | 4–1 | 2nd | | |
| 2011 | Monterey Peninsula | 7–4 | 4–1 | T–1st | L Credit Union Bowl | 12 (Northern) |
| 2012 | Monterey Peninsula | 5–6 | 4–1 | T–1st | L Living Breath Foundation Bowl | |
| 2013 | Monterey Peninsula | 4–6 | 3–2 | T–2nd | | |
Monterey Peninsula Lobos (American Golden Coast Conference / League) (2014–2019)
| 2014 | Monterey Peninsula | 4–6 | 2–4 | 5th | | |
| 2015 | Monterey Peninsula | 5–5 | 3–3 | 4th | | |
| 2016 | Monterey Peninsula | 10–1 | 5–1 | T–1st | W Living Breath Foundation Bowl | 16 |
| 2017 | Monterey Peninsula | 7–4 | 5–1 | T–1st | L American Division Championship Bowl | |
| 2018 | Monterey Peninsula | 5–5 | 3–3 | T–4th | | |
| 2019 | Monterey Peninsula | 10–1 | 5–1 | 2nd | W Living Breath Foundation Bowl | T–25 |
| Monterey Peninsula: | | 115–83 | 60–37 | | | |
| Total: | | 115–83 | | | | |
National championship Conference title Conference division title or championship game berth
