= 1994 Hofstra Flying Dutchmen football team =

American college football season

1994 Hofstra Flying Dutchmen football
- Conference: Independent

Ranking
- Sports Network: No. 23
- Record: 8–1–1
- Head coach: Joe Gardi (5th season)
- Home stadium: Hofstra Stadium

1994 NCAA Division I-AA independents football standings
	Conf.			Overall
Team	W	L	T	W		L		T
No. 1 Youngstown State ^		–		11	–	0	–	1
No. 23 Hofstra		–		8	–	1	–	1
Towson State		–		8	–	2	–	0
No. 10 Troy State ^		–		8	–	4	–	0
Robert Morris		–		7	–	1	–	1
Monmouth		–		7	–	2	–	0
Saint Mary's		–		7	–	3	–	0
UAB		–		7	–	4	–	0
No. 20 UCF		–		7	–	4	–	0
Wagner		–		6	–	5	–	0
Liberty		–		5	–	6	–	0
Western Kentucky		–		5	–	6	–	0
Central Connecticut State		–		4	–	6	–	0
Samford		–		4	–	6	–	1
Davidson		–		3	–	7	–	0
Buffalo		–		3	–	8	–	0
Saint Francis (PA)		–		2	–	7	–	1
Charleston Southern		–		0	–	11	–	0
^ – NCAA Division I-AA playoff participant; Rankings from The Sports Network poll

The 1994 Hofstra Flying Dutchmen football team was an American football team that represented Hofstra University as an independent during the 1994 NCAA Division I-AA football season. Led by fifth-year head coach Joe Gardi, the team compiled a 8–1–1 record.

== Schedule ==
Date	Opponent	Rank	Site	Result	Attendance	Source
September 3	at Butler		Butler Bowl; Indianapolis, IN	W 41–0	5,402	
September 10	at Bucknell		Christy Mathewson–Memorial Stadium; Lewisburg, PA	W 45–21	5,450	
September 17	Fordham		Hofstra Stadium; Hempstead, NY	W 30–20	5,189	
September 24	at Lafayette		Fisher Stadium; Easton, PA	W 27–6	7,220	
October 1	No. 21 New Hampshire		Hofstra Stadium; Hempstead, NY	W 28–6		
October 7	Central Connecticut State		Hofstra Stadium; Hempstead, NY	W 62–7	3,827	
October 22	at Buffalo	No. 21	University at Buffalo Stadium; Amherst, NY	W 34–21	3,009	
October 28	Towson State	No. 20	Hofstra Stadium; Hempstead, NY	L 21–24	5,829	
November 4	Rhode Island	No. 23	Hofstra Stadium; Hempstead, NY	W 42–16	5,081	
November 12	at Delaware	No. 23	Delaware Stadium; Newark, DE	T 41–41		
Rankings from The Sports Network Poll released prior to the game
