= 1994 Youngstown State Penguins football team =

American college football season

1994 Youngstown State Penguins football

NCAA Division I-AA champion

NCAA Division I-AA Championship Game, W 28–14 vs. Boise State
- Conference: Independent

Ranking
- Sports Network: No. 1
- Record: 14–0–1
- Head coach: Jim Tressel (9th season)
- Home stadium: Stambaugh Stadium

1994 NCAA Division I-AA independents football standings
	Conf.			Overall
Team	W	L	T	W		L		T
No. 1 Youngstown State ^		–		11	–	0	–	1
No. 23 Hofstra		–		8	–	1	–	1
Towson State		–		8	–	2	–	0
No. 10 Troy State ^		–		8	–	4	–	0
Robert Morris		–		7	–	1	–	1
Monmouth		–		7	–	2	–	0
Saint Mary's		–		7	–	3	–	0
UAB		–		7	–	4	–	0
No. 20 UCF		–		7	–	4	–	0
Wagner		–		6	–	5	–	0
Liberty		–		5	–	6	–	0
Western Kentucky		–		5	–	6	–	0
Central Connecticut State		–		4	–	6	–	0
Samford		–		4	–	6	–	1
Davidson		–		3	–	7	–	0
Buffalo		–		3	–	8	–	0
Saint Francis (PA)		–		2	–	7	–	1
Charleston Southern		–		0	–	11	–	0
^ – NCAA Division I-AA playoff participant; Rankings from The Sports Network poll

The 1994 Youngstown State Penguins football team was an American football team represented Youngstown State University in the 1994 NCAA Division I-AA football season. In their ninth season under head coach Jim Tressel, the team compiled a 14–0–1 record and defeated Boise State in the 1994 NCAA Division I-AA Football Championship Game.

After playing Stephen F. Austin to a tie in the opening game, the team won 14 consecutive games, the longest winning streak in school history. It was Youngstown State's third national championship in four years.

Tailback Shawn Patton received the team's most valuable player award, and wide receiver Trent Boykin was named the team's outstanding offensive player. The team's statistical leaders included Shawn Patton with 1,626 rushing yards and quarterback Mark Brungard with 2,453 passing yards and 21 passing touchdowns.

== Schedule ==
Date	Opponent	Rank	Site	Result	Attendance	Source
September 1	No. 15 Stephen F. Austin	No. 2	Stambaugh Stadium; Youngstown, OH	T 10–10	17,200	
September 10	at Delaware State	No. 5	Alumni Stadium; Dover, DE	W 26–3		
September 17	No. 14 Eastern Kentucky	No. 4	Stambaugh Stadium; Youngstown, OH	W 13–6		
September 24	Slippery Rock	No. 5	Stambaugh Stadium; Youngstown, OH	W 52–17	13,984	
October 1	No. 2 McNeese State	No. 5	Stambaugh Stadium; Youngstown, OH	W 28–8	16,906	
October 8	No. 1 (D-II) North Alabama^{†}	No. 3	Stambaugh Stadium; Youngstown, OH	W 17–14	17,411	
October 15	Kent State	No. 3	Stambaugh Stadium; Youngstown, OH	W 28–15	14,672	
October 29	Akron	No. 2	Stambaugh Stadium; Youngstown, OH (Steel Tire)	W 41–7	17,760	
November 5	at Buffalo	No. 2	University at Buffalo Stadium; Amherst, NY	W 27–3	3,374	
November 12	at UMass	No. 1	McGuirk Stadium; Hadley, MA	W 28–9	6,150	
November 19	at Indiana State	No. 1	Memorial Stadium; Terre Haute, IN	W 14–3	3,513	
November 25	No. 15 Alcorn State	No. 1	Stambaugh Stadium; Youngstown, OH (NCAA Division I-AA First Round)	W 63–20	16,455	
December 3	No. 4 Eastern Kentucky	No. 1	Stambaugh Stadium; Youngstown, OH (NCAA Division I-AA Quarterfinal)	W 18–15		
December 10	No. 8 Montana	No. 1	Stambaugh Stadium; Youngstown, OH (NCAA Division I-AA Semifinal)	W 28–9	15,333	
December 17	vs. No. 3 Boise State	No. 1	Marshall University Stadium; Huntington, WV (NCAA Division I-AA Championship Game)	W 28–14	27,674	
^{†}Homecoming; Rankings from The Sports Network Poll released prior to the game
