= Fred Mariani =

American football coach

Playing career
- c. 1973: Saint Joseph's (IN)
- Position: Offensive lineman

Coaching career (HC unless noted)
- 1974: Saint Joseph's (IN) (GA)
- 1984–1987: Morehead State (OC/RC)
- 1988–1993: Fordham (OL/RC)
- 1994–1997: Lehigh (OC/RC)
- 1998–2008: Iona
- 2009–?: Rutgers (DFO)

Head coaching record
- Overall: 46–68

Accomplishments and honors

Championships
- 1 MAAC (2007)

Fred Mariani is an American former college football coach. He served as the head football coach at Iona College in New Rochelle, New York from 1998 to 2008, compiling a record of 46–68. He was the final head coach for the Iona Gaels football program, which was discontinued following the 2008 season.

A resident of Saddle River, New Jersey, Mariani played high school football at Don Bosco Preparatory High School and collegiately for the Saint Joseph's Pumas football team.

== Head coaching record ==
Year	Team	Overall	Conference	Standing	Bowl/playoffs
Iona Gaels (Metro Atlantic Athletic Conference) (1998–2007)
1998	Iona	4–6	2–6	T–6th	
1999	Iona	5–5	4–4	4th	
2000	Iona	4–7	3–5	6th	
2001	Iona	4–5	3–3	4th	
2002	Iona	5–6	4–4	5th	
2003	Iona	6–5	4–1	2nd	
2004	Iona	2–8	1–3	T–3rd	
2005	Iona	3–7	1–3	4th	
2006	Iona	3–7	2–2	3rd	
2007	Iona	7–4	2–1	T–1st	
Iona Gaels (NCAA Division I FCS independent) (2008)
2008	Iona	3–8			
Iona:		46–68	28–33		
Total:		46–68			
National championship Conference title Conference division title or championship game berth
