= 1994 UCF Golden Knights football team =

American college football season

1994 UCF Golden Knights football
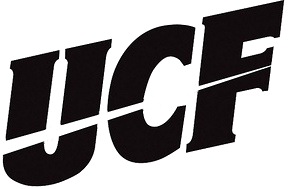
- Conference: Independent

Ranking
- Sports Network: No. 20
- Record: 7–3
- Head coach: Gene McDowell (10th season)
- Offensive coordinator: Mike Kruczek (10th season)
- Defensive coordinator: Ron McCrone (3rd season)
- Home stadium: Florida Citrus Bowl

1994 NCAA Division I-AA independents football standings
	Conf.			Overall
Team	W	L	T	W		L		T
No. 1 Youngstown State ^		–		11	–	0	–	1
No. 23 Hofstra		–		8	–	1	–	1
Towson State		–		8	–	2	–	0
No. 10 Troy State ^		–		8	–	4	–	0
Robert Morris		–		7	–	1	–	1
Monmouth		–		7	–	2	–	0
Saint Mary's		–		7	–	3	–	0
UAB		–		7	–	4	–	0
No. 20 UCF		–		7	–	4	–	0
Wagner		–		6	–	5	–	0
Liberty		–		5	–	6	–	0
Western Kentucky		–		5	–	6	–	0
Central Connecticut State		–		4	–	6	–	0
Samford		–		4	–	6	–	1
Davidson		–		3	–	7	–	0
Buffalo		–		3	–	8	–	0
Saint Francis (PA)		–		2	–	7	–	1
Charleston Southern		–		0	–	11	–	0
^ – NCAA Division I-AA playoff participant; Rankings from The Sports Network poll

The 1994 UCF Golden Knights football season was the sixteenth season for the team and Gene McDowell's tenth as the head coach of the Golden Knights. After the Golden Knight's impressive 1993 season, UCF was selected as the Division I-AA Preseason #1 to start the 1994 season. The 1994 season would prove disappointing however, as the Golden Knights would finish the season ranked #20 with a 7–4 record.

The school's famous campus homecoming tradition "Spirit Splash" began (by chance) in 1994.

== Schedule ==
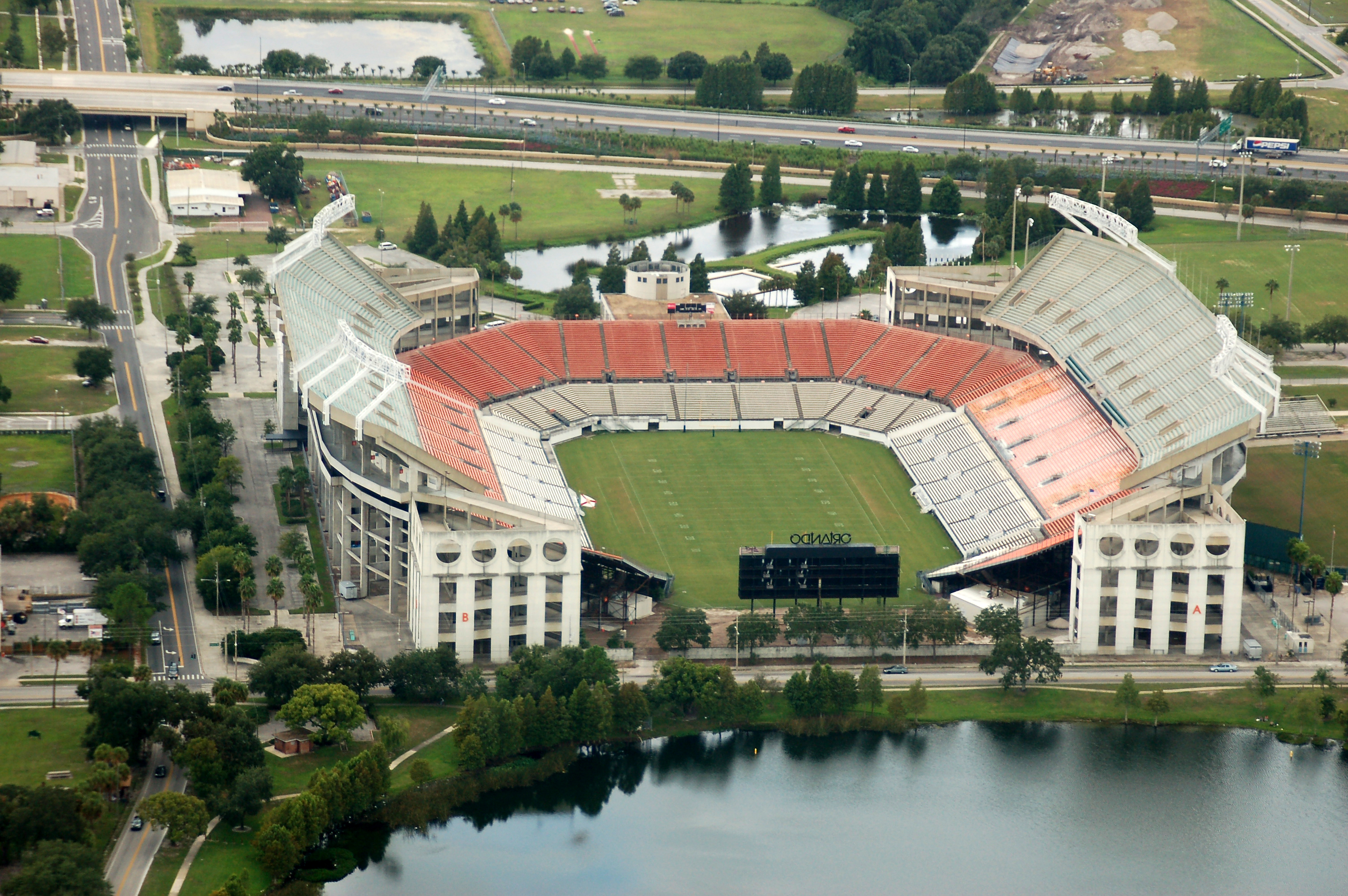
The Florida Citrus Bowl, the Knights' home field

Date	Opponent	Rank	Site	Result	Attendance	Source
September 3	at Maine	No. 7	Alumni Stadium; Orono, ME	W 28–6	6,296	
September 10	No. 18 (D-II) Valdosta State	No. 6	Florida Citrus Bowl; Orlando, FL	L 14–31	22,518	
September 17	Bethune–Cookman	No. 12	Florida Citrus Bowl; Orlando, FL	W 48–17	22,049	
September 24	No. 11 Western Kentucky	No. 13	Florida Citrus Bowl; Orlando, FL	W 59–45	24,326	
October 1	at Illinois State	No. 9	Hancock Stadium; Normal, IL	W 27–26	6,550	
October 8	at Samford	No. 6	Seibert Stadium; Homewood, AL	L 35–36	3,632	
October 15	at Northeast Louisiana	No. 15	Malone Stadium; Monroe, LA	W 33–16	8,123	
October 22	No. 5 Troy State	No. 11	Florida Citrus Bowl; Orlando, FL	L 38–39	27,003	
October 29	at Liberty	No. 17	Williams Stadium; Lynchburg, VA	W 49–24	6,153	
November 12	at East Carolina	No. 16	Ficklen Memorial Stadium; Greenville, NC	L 20–23	25,783	
November 19	Buffalo	No. 20	Florida Citrus Bowl; Orlando, FL	W 48–0	18,856	
Rankings from The Sports Network Poll released prior to the game

== Roster ==
1994 UCF Golden Knights football team roster
Players			Coaches
Offense: Pos. / # / Name / Class; C / 60 / Mike Gruttadauria / Sr	Defense: Pos. / # / Name / Class; DE / 95 / Greg Jefferson / Sr	Special teams: Pos. / # / Name / Class	Head coach: Ron Rogerson; Coordinators/assistant coaches Legend: (C) Team captain; (S) Suspended; (I) Ineligible; Injured; Redshirt
