= 1994 Troy State Trojans football team =

American college football season

1994 Troy State Trojans football

NCAA Division I-AA First Round, L 26–45 at James Madison
- Conference: Independent

Ranking
- Sports Network: No. 10
- Record: 8–4
- Head coach: Larry Blakeney (4th season)
- Offensive coordinator: Don Jacobs (4th season)
- Defensive coordinator: Richard Kent (1st season)
- Home stadium: Veterans Memorial Stadium

1994 NCAA Division I-AA independents football standings
	Conf.			Overall
Team	W	L	T	W		L		T
No. 1 Youngstown State ^		–		11	–	0	–	1
No. 23 Hofstra		–		8	–	1	–	1
Towson State		–		8	–	2	–	0
No. 10 Troy State ^		–		8	–	4	–	0
Robert Morris		–		7	–	1	–	1
Monmouth		–		7	–	2	–	0
Saint Mary's		–		7	–	3	–	0
UAB		–		7	–	4	–	0
No. 20 UCF		–		7	–	4	–	0
Wagner		–		6	–	5	–	0
Liberty		–		5	–	6	–	0
Western Kentucky		–		5	–	6	–	0
Central Connecticut State		–		4	–	6	–	0
Samford		–		4	–	6	–	1
Davidson		–		3	–	7	–	0
Buffalo		–		3	–	8	–	0
Saint Francis (PA)		–		2	–	7	–	1
Charleston Southern		–		0	–	11	–	0
^ – NCAA Division I-AA playoff participant; Rankings from The Sports Network poll

The 1994 Troy State Trojans football team represented Troy State University—now known as Troy University—as an independent during the 1994 NCAA Division I-AA football season. Led by fourth-year head coach Larry Blakeney, the Trojans compiled a record of 8–4. For the second consecutive season, Troy State advanced to the NCAA Division I-AA Football Championship playoffs, where the Trojans lost to James Madison in the first round. The Trojans were ranked No. 10 in the final Sports Network poll. The team played home games at Veterans Memorial Stadium in Troy, Alabama.

== Schedule ==
Date	Opponent	Rank	Site	Result	Attendance	Source
September 10	at Connecticut*	No. 7	Memorial Stadium; Storrs, CT	W 31–21		
September 17	at Southwestern Louisiana*	No. 5	Cajun Field; Lafayette, LA	W 39–20		
September 24	Alabama State*	No. 4	Veterans Memorial Stadium; Troy, AL	W 49–27		
October 1	at Northwestern State*	No. 4	Harry Turpin Stadium; Natchitoches, LA	L 20–24		
October 8	Nicholls State*	No. 7	Veterans Memorial Stadium; Troy, AL	W 35–14		
October 15	Charleston Southern*	No. 6	Veterans Memorial Stadium; Troy, AL	W 55–20		
October 22	at No. 11 UCF*	No. 5	Florida Citrus Bowl; Orlando, FL	W 39–38	27,003	
October 29	at No. 24 Western Kentucky*	No. 4	L.T. Smith Stadium; Bowling Green, KY	W 38–16	6,400	
November 5	at Cincinnati*	No. 3	Nippert Stadium; Cincinnati, OH	L 24–28	15,996	
November 12	at No. 21 Alcorn State*	No. 6	Jack Spinks Stadium; Lorman, MS	L 44–47	9,600	
November 17	Samford*	No. 12	Veterans Memorial Stadium; Troy, AL	W 30–26		
November 26	at No. 13 James Madison*	No. 10	Bridgeforth Stadium; Harrisonburg, VA (NCAA Division I-AA First Round)	L 26–45	5,200	
*Non-conference game; Rankings from The Sports Network Poll released prior to the game
