= 1994 Western Kentucky Hilltoppers football team =

American college football season

1994 Western Kentucky Hilltoppers football
- Conference: Independent
- Record: 5–6
- Head coach: Jack Harbaugh (6th season)
- Captains: Sheldon Benoit; Lito Mason
- Home stadium: L. T. Smith Stadium

1994 NCAA Division I-AA independents football standings
	Conf.			Overall
Team	W	L	T	W		L		T
No. 1 Youngstown State ^		–		11	–	0	–	1
No. 23 Hofstra		–		8	–	1	–	1
Towson State		–		8	–	2	–	0
No. 10 Troy State ^		–		8	–	4	–	0
Robert Morris		–		7	–	1	–	1
Monmouth		–		7	–	2	–	0
Saint Mary's		–		7	–	3	–	0
UAB		–		7	–	4	–	0
No. 20 UCF		–		7	–	4	–	0
Wagner		–		6	–	5	–	0
Liberty		–		5	–	6	–	0
Western Kentucky		–		5	–	6	–	0
Central Connecticut State		–		4	–	6	–	0
Samford		–		4	–	6	–	1
Davidson		–		3	–	7	–	0
Buffalo		–		3	–	8	–	0
Saint Francis (PA)		–		2	–	7	–	1
Charleston Southern		–		0	–	11	–	0
^ – NCAA Division I-AA playoff participant; Rankings from The Sports Network poll

The 1994 Western Kentucky Hilltoppers football team represented Western Kentucky University as an independent during the 1994 NCAA Division I-AA football season Led by sixth-year head coach Jack Harbaugh, the Hilltoppers compiled a record of 5–6. The team's captains were Sheldon Benoit and Lito Mason.

== Schedule ==
Date	Opponent	Rank	Site	Result	Attendance	Source
September 1	Eastern Kentucky		L. T. Smith Stadium; Bowling Green, KY (Battle of the Bluegrass)	W 24–21	12,300	
September 8	at Murray State	No. 19	Roy Stewart Stadium; Murray, KY (Battle for the Red Belt)	W 39–13	8,161	
September 17	Austin Peay	No. 11	L. T. Smith Stadium; Bowling Green, KY	W 21–3	10,100	
September 24	at No. 13 UCF*	No. 11	Florida Citrus Bowl; Orlando, FL	L 45–59	24,326	
October 1	at UAB*	No. 14	Legion Field; Birmingham, AL	W 31–22	20,237	
October 8	No. 8 (D-II) Portland State	No. 10	L. T. Smith Stadium; Bowling Green, KY	L 14–49	8,800	
October 15	at Jacksonville State	No. 19	Paul Snow Stadium; Jacksonville, AL	W 22–20	12,077	
October 22	Southern Illinois^{†}	No. 16	L. T. Smith Stadium; Bowling Green, KY	L 7–10	11,900	
October 29	No. 4 Troy State	No. 25	L. T. Smith Stadium; Bowling Green, KY	L 16–38	6,400	
November 5	Indiana State		L. T. Smith Stadium; Bowling Green, KY	L 16–28	6,000	
November 12	at Eastern Illinois		O'Brien Field; Charleston, IL	L 20–28	1,003	
*Non-conference game; ^{†}Homecoming; Rankings from NCAA Division I-AA Football Committee Poll released prior to the game
