= Yates Field House =

Recreation and intramural sports complex at Georgetown University

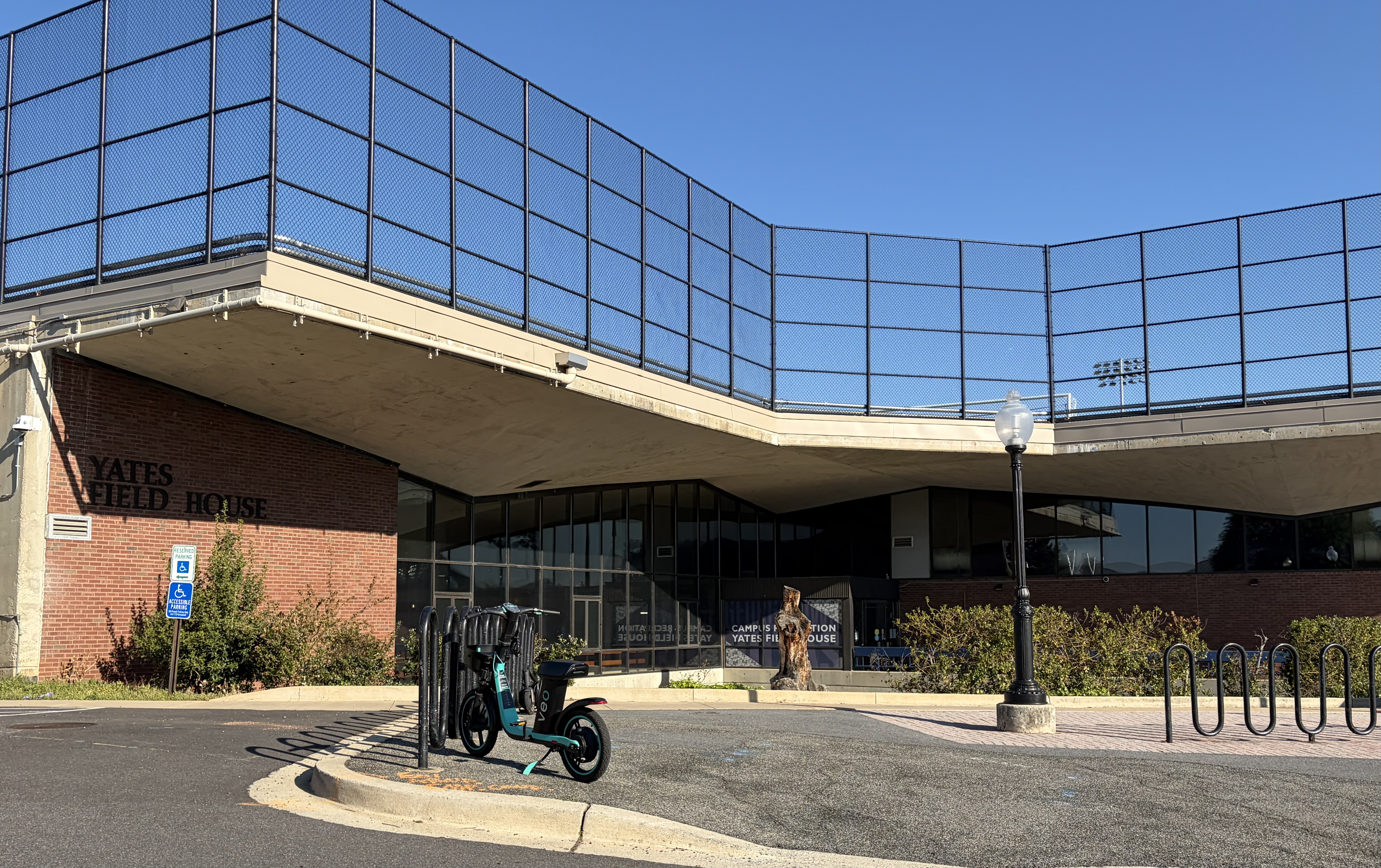
- The entrance of Yates Field House

- Location within Washington, D.C. Location within the United States
- Location: 3700 O Street, N.W., Washington, D.C.
- Coordinates: 38°54′33″N 77°04′36″W
- Owner: Georgetown University
- Operator: Georgetown University

Construction
- Groundbreaking: 1977
- Opened: July 30, 1979
- Renovated: 1987, 2002, 2019
- Cost: $7.5 million (equivalent to $33.27 million in 2025)

Website
- yatesfieldhouse.com

Yates Field House is a recreation and intramural sports complex at Georgetown University in Washington, D.C. It was built in the late 1970s largely underground, on the site of the university's football stadium.

The four-level, 142,000-square foot facility includes 2 racquetball courts, 5 squash courts, 4 newly renovated indoor basketball courts (as of 2025), a 200-meter jogging track and 25-meter eight-lane indoor swimming pool, a diving pool, along with exercise rooms, weight rooms, locker rooms, saunas and a half-acre dance area. The facility is home to many varsity sports teams including swim and dive, tennis and other. The center was named after the Rev. Gerard F. Yates, a long-standing Georgetown professor of government, and dean of the graduate school.

Problems with the unusual roof arrangement — including torn artificial turf, pooling rainwater and interior leaks — have led to major renovations in 1987, 2002 and 2019, and periodic calls for Yates to be replaced. Because of problems with the playing surface, varsity teams have not used the rooftop Kehoe Field since 2002, and even intramural and recreational users were barred from the roof in 2016. Since then renovations have taken place and recreational users have been welcomed back, as well as varsity sports, including field hockey, and track teams.

== Construction ==
In the mid-1970s, Georgetown sought to expand student and faculty opportunities for recreation, training and fitness, and relieve overcrowding on the varsity sports fields and at McDonough Gymnasium. Planners found it difficult to find the space on campus, or acquire new land adjacent to campus, that they would need for such a large facility.

The solution was to dig up Kehoe Field, the varsity football stadium on campus, and build the field house underneath. While under construction, Yates was known on campus as the "Rec-Plex". In addition to saving the cost buying land for a campus expansion, the underground location was also projected to cost 30% less to heat and cool than an aboveground structure.

Kehoe Field had hosted varsity and intramural sports at Georgetown since 1956. During the construction, the football team played its 1977 and 1978 home games in the outfield of the baseball field, in a natural bowl on the present-day site of the Georgetown business school's Rafik B. Hariri Building.

After two years of construction, the $7.5 million fieldhouse opened July 30, 1979, eight months behind schedule. The rooftop football field, which retained the name Kehoe Field, was ready in time for the 1979 season.

== Renovations ==
By the time the facility was a decade old, roof problems were already commonplace. Rainwater did not drain properly, resulting in the need for $1.8 million in repairs in 1987 and $7 million in repairs in 2002. The Hoyas were forced to move most of their scheduled home games of the 1990 season to opponents' sites, as the university struggled to repair bubbling and cracking in the 400-meter outdoor running track that surrounded the football field.

For the 2002 season, the football team moved to what was then Georgetown's soccer stadium, Harbin Field, ending Kehoe Field's use for varsity sports games. Harbin Field was later redeveloped into what is now known as Cooper Field.

Kehoe Field continued to be used as the home of intramural and club sports until 2016, when a recurrence of the longstanding drainage problems led to the outdoor facility again being deemed unsafe, forcing Georgetown student groups to rent off-campus fields. In 2018, the university unveiled plans to restore Kehoe Field as an intramural sports field and recreation area.

In, 2019 Kehoe field was completed and it is back up and although it no longer hosts any Georgetown sports teams, it has shifted its focus to being available for intramural sports events, club sports, approved recreational events, and students who use the 110,000 sq ft field for all their activities. The new field boasts a new top of the line AstroTurf 3D3 trionic fiber field, and around it is a new 404 meter long track made of competition grade Benyon. Overall, Kehoe fields focus has shifted from hosting varsity sports competitions and practices to becoming an accessible area for students and members.

In 2025, Yates Field House underwent a renovation project for its decades old basketball courts, which were completed in February of that year. By the end of the project the Yates Field House had 4 brand new maple wood basketball courts, complete with regulation size hoops, and official Georgetown court logos.

== Events/Uses ==
The Yates Field House, hosts events and classes. These include, dance classes, tennis lessons, group spin-cycle classes, aquatic aerobics classes, and yoga classes, as well as countless intramural sports events, fencing competitions, wrestling competitions as well as many others.
