= 1994 NCAA Division I-AA Football Championship Game =

1994 NCAA Division I-AA Football Championship
- I-AA National Championship Game
Boise State Broncos	Youngstown State Penguins
(13–1)	(13–0–1)
Big Sky	Independent
14	28
Head coach: Pokey Allen	Head coach: Jim Tressel
TSN / Seed; 3 / 3	TSN / Seed; 1 / 1
	1	2	3	4	Total
Boise State	7	0	0	7	14
Youngstown State	0	14	7	7	28
- Date: December 17, 1994
- Season: 1994
- Stadium: Marshall University Stadium
- Location: Huntington, West Virginia
- Favorite: Youngstown State by 7
- Referee: Joe Arnone
- Attendance: 27,674

United States TV coverage
- Network: CBS Sports
- Announcers: Sean McDonough (play-by-play), Steve Davis (color), Dave Logan (sideline)

The 1994 NCAA Division I-AA Football Championship Game was a postseason college football game between the Youngstown State Penguins and the Boise State Broncos. The game was played on December 17, 1994, at Marshall University Stadium in Huntington, West Virginia. The culminating game of the 1994 NCAA Division I-AA football season, it was won by Youngstown State, 28–14.

== Teams ==
The participants of the Championship Game were the finalists of the 1994 I-AA Playoffs, which began with a 16-team bracket. The site of the title game, Marshall University Stadium, had been determined in March 1994.

=== Youngstown State Penguins ===
Youngstown State finished their regular season with a 10–0–1 record. The only game they did not win was a season opening tie with Stephen F. Austin. One of their wins was a 17–14 victory over the defending NCAA Division II champion North Alabama Lions. Seeded first in the playoffs, the Penguins defeated Alcorn State, Eastern Kentucky, and Montana to reach the final. This was the fourth appearance, both consecutively and overall, for Youngstown State in a Division I-AA championship game, having won in 1991 and 1993, and having lost in 1992.

=== Boise State Broncos ===
Boise State finished their regular season with a 10–1 record (6–1 in conference). Their only loss came in an away game at Idaho State. The Broncos, seeded third, defeated North Texas, Appalachian State, and second-seed Marshall to reach the final. This was the second appearance for Boise State in a Division I-AA championship game, having won in 1980.

== Game summary ==
=== Scoring summary ===
Scoring summary

Quarter	Time	Drive			Team	Scoring information	Score	
Quarter	Time	Plays	Yards	TOP	Team	Scoring information	BSU	YSU
1	2:46				BSU	Randy Matyshock 5-yard touchdown reception from Tony Hilde, Greg Erickson kick good	7	0
2	9:43				YSU	Mark Brungard 2-yard touchdown run, Paul Massaro kick good	7	7
2	0:35				YSU	Brungard 38-yard touchdown run, Massaro kick good	7	14
3	3:02				YSU	Don Zwisler 5-yard touchdown reception from Brungard, Massaro kick good	7	21
4	7:15				YSU	Shawn Patton 55-yard touchdown run, Massaro kick good	7	28
4	4:19				BSU	Matyshock 6-yard touchdown reception from Hilde, Erickson kick good	14	28
"TOP" = time of possession. For other American football terms, see Glossary of American football.							14	28

=== Game statistics ===
	1	2	3	4	Total
No. 3 Broncos	7	0	0	7	14
No. 1 Penguins	0	14	7	7	28

Statistics	BSU	YSU
First downs	13	20
Plays–yards	60–225	70–422
Rushes–yards	29–59	51–263
Passing yards	166	159
Passing: comp–att–int	17–31–2	9–19–2
Time of possession	26:02	33:58

Team	Category	Player	Statistics
Boise State	Passing	Tony Hilde	17–31, 166 yds, 2 TD, 2 INT
Boise State	Rushing	K. C. Adams	11 car, 30 yds
Boise State	Receiving	Ryan Ikebe	5 rec, 63 yds
Youngstown State	Passing	Mark Brungard	9–19, 159 yds, 1 TD, 1 INT
Youngstown State	Rushing	Shawn Patton	27 car, 140 yds, 1 TD
Youngstown State	Receiving	Don Zwisler	3 rec, 91 yds, 1 TD
