= Iona Gaels football =

Iona Gaels
- First season: 1965; 61 years ago
- Last season: 2008; 18 years ago
- Location: New Rochelle, New York
- Stadium: Mazzella Field (capacity: 2,440)
- NCAA division: Division I FCS
- Conference: Independent
- Colors: Maroon and gold
- All-time record: 196–214–7 (.478)
- Bowl record: 0–0 (–)

National championships
- Claimed: 0

Conference championships
- 2 (1993, 2007)

Conference division championships
- 0
- Website: ICGaels.com

The Iona Gaels football program was the intercollegiate American football team for Iona College located in New Rochelle, New York. The team competed in the NCAA Division I Football Championship Subdivision (FCS) The school's first football team was fielded in 1965.

== Notable former players ==
Notable alumni include:

- Tony DeMeo, retired football coach
- Kyle Flood, former head coach of the Rutgers Scarlet Knights football team and current offensive coordinator for the University of Texas Longhorns football team.

== Championships ==
=== Conference championships ===
Year	Conference	Coach	Overall record	Conference record
1993	Metro Atlantic Athletic Conference	Harold Crocker	9–2	5–0
2007	Metro Atlantic Athletic Conference (Co-championship)	Fred Mariani	7–4	2–1
Total conference championships			2
