= Kehoe Field =

Sports field at Georgetown University

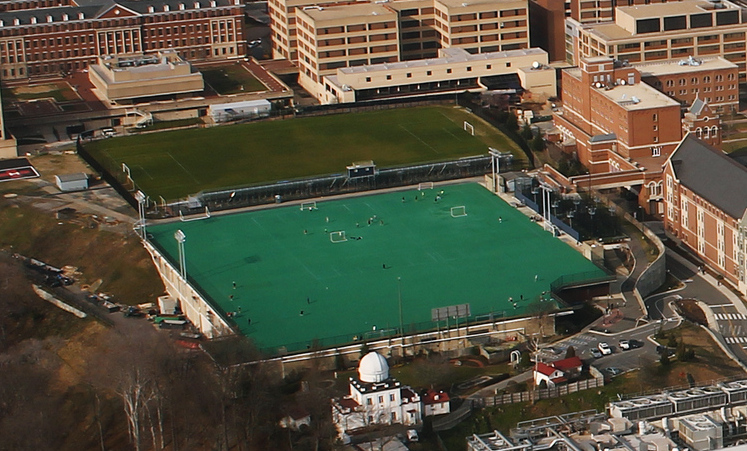
- Aerial photo of Kehoe Field in 2013

- Location within Washington, D.C. Location within the United States
- Location: 3700 O Street, N.W., Washington, D.C.
- Coordinates: 38°54′33″N 77°04′36″W
- Owner: Georgetown University
- Operator: Georgetown University
- Capacity: 2,400 (until 2002)
- Surface: Omniturf

Construction
- Opened: December 1, 1956
- Renovated: 1987, 2002, 2019

Tenant
- Georgetown Hoyas (NCAA) (1956–2002)

Kehoe Field is the name of two fields that served as the home of the Georgetown Hoyas intramural sports and varsity athletics teams, including several seasons of Hoyas football, since the 1950s. They occupied the same site, successively, on the Georgetown University campus in Washington, D.C.

The original Kehoe Field was a grass-surfaced stadium designed for American football and soccer, and was open from 1956 to 1976. After a two-year construction project, the second Kehoe Field opened on the same site, as an artificial-surface stadium on the roof of Yates Field House. After the departure of varsity athletics in 2002, the second Kehoe Field remained open for intramural sports and recreation.

Kehoe Field was named after the Rev. John J. Kehoe, Georgetown's athletic director from 1932 to 1944. Kehoe, who later led the faculty of Fordham University, died in July 1955.

== Original field ==
Construction of a football stadium on the Georgetown campus was reportedly one of Kehoe's "pet projects". During Kehoe's time at the university, the Hoyas had a nationally prominent varsity football program. Football was discontinued after the 1950 season, however, and Kehoe himself did not live to see the stadium open. With no intercollegiate football games on campus, the field's dedication on December 1, 1956, was at a soccer game between the Georgetown Hoyas and Fordham Rams.

Kehoe Field had to wait nearly a decade to host its first intercollegiate football game. It was supposed to be played in 1963, when Georgetown students finally convinced administrators to let them choose an "all-star" team from the intramural football league and play a single game against Frostburg State College. That November 23 game was canceled, however, because of the assassination of John F. Kennedy the previous day. Instead, the first game came a year later, when the Hoyas faced a club team from New York University, also playing its first intercollegiate matchup in decades, on November 21, 1964.

In the following years, Kehoe continued to serve as the home of Georgetown's club football team—a student-led organization that played a limited slate of games against other colleges. Starting in 1970, Kehoe again hosted varsity football, as the Hoyas moved up from a student club to a full NCAA Division III program.

== Building Yates ==
The original Kehoe Field closed after the 1976 football season, to make way for a two-year project to build a new indoor recreation and training facility, Yates Field House. The $7.5 million fieldhouse was built mostly underground, with a replacement football field and running track to be built on its roof. The indoor facility was named for the Rev. Gerard F. Yates, a Georgetown faculty member.

Yates Field House opened July 30, 1979, eight months behind schedule. The rooftop playing surface, which retained the name Kehoe Field, was ready in time for the 1979 season.

During the construction, the Hoyas played their 1977 and 1978 home football games in the outfield of the baseball field, in a natural bowl on the present-day site of the Georgetown business school's Rafik B. Hariri Building.

== Rooftop stadium ==
Kehoe Field reopened in September 1979 with a Georgetown win over Duquesne on the new Astroturf surface. By 1990, Georgetown had upgraded the surface to Omniturf.

The stadium complex was actually larger than the Yates Field House roof, with its northern end stretching past the Yates footprint toward Georgetown University Medical Center. This extra practice space was known as North Kehoe Field, and was later renovated into the Shaw Field soccer facility.

With a seating capacity of 2,400, the rooftop Kehoe Field became one of the smallest football stadiums in NCAA Division I in 1993, when Georgetown became part of the Metro Atlantic Athletic Conference of Division I-AA (now known as the Football Championship Subdivision). It was about average-sized for the MAAC football conference, which was founded as a home for Division I schools that did not emphasize football.

When Georgetown joined the more competitive Patriot League in 2001, however, Kehoe was now by far the smallest stadium in its conference; every other Patriot League facility was at least twice its size. Speculation began that the university would seek to expand or replace the stadium.

== Renovations ==
Additionally, the rooftop Kehoe Field was not aging well. Rainwater did not drain properly from the flat roof, resulting in the need for $1.8 million in repairs in 1987 and $7 million in repairs in 2002. The Hoyas were forced to move most of their scheduled home games of the 1990 season to opponents' sites, as the university struggled to repair bubbling and cracking in the surrounding running track.

For the 2002 season, the football team moved to Georgetown's soccer stadium, Harbin Field. That facility was later redeveloped into what is now known as Cooper Field.

Kehoe Field continued to be used as the home of intramural and club sports until 2016, when a recurrence of the longstanding drainage problems led to the facility again being deemed unsafe, forcing Georgetown student groups to rent off-campus fields. In 2018, the university unveiled plans to restore Kehoe Field as an intramural sports field and recreation area.
