= Demske Sports Complex =

Sports complex in Buffalo, New York, US

- Interactive map of Demske Sports Complex
- Full name: Rev. James M. Demske Sports Complex
- Location: Main Street and Delavan Avenue, Buffalo, New York, United States
- Coordinates: 42.921297°N 78.855891°W
- Owner: Canisius College
- Operator: Canisius College
- Capacity: 1,200
- Surface: A-Turf (2008–present); AstroTurf 12 (1989–2008)
- Scoreboard: Electronic
- Acreage: 14 acres

Construction
- Built: 1989
- Cost: $4.5 million (estimated)

Tenants
- Canisius Golden Griffins baseball, men's and women's soccer, men's and women's lacrosse, softball (MAAC) (1989–present); FC Buffalo (NPSL) (2014)

The Rev. James M. Demske Sports Complex is a baseball, soccer, lacrosse, and softball venue in Buffalo, New York, United States. It is home to the Canisius Golden Griffins baseball, men's and women's soccer, men's and women's lacrosse, and softball teams of the NCAA Division I Metro Atlantic Athletic Conference (MAAC). Built in 1989, the venue has a capacity of 1,200 spectators. The building is named for Rev. James Demske, who served as the President of Canisius College from 1966 until 1993. It is located behind the Koessler Athletic Center on Canisius' campus. To save space and money in the college's urban setting, the 14-acre (5.7 ha) facility is home to six Canisius athletic programs.

From 1989 to 2008, the facility had an AstroTurf 12 surface. In 2008, renovations installed 123,000 square feet (11,400 m^{2}) of A-Turf, which lessens the impact on athletes who play on the surface. Also in 2008, new scoreboard and baseball dugouts were added. The facility also features stadium lighting and locker rooms.

In 2004, 2009, and 2011, the venue hosted the MAAC Men's Lacrosse Championships. In 2010, it hosted the MAAC Softball Championships. In May 2012, it hosted the MAAC Women's Lacrosse Championships.

== See also ==
- List of NCAA Division I baseball venues
