= 1994 NCAA Division I-AA football season =

American college football season

1994 NCAA Division I-AA season

Regular season
- Number of teams: 117
- Duration: August–November
- Payton Award: Steve McNair (QB, Alcorn State)

Playoff
- Duration: November 26–December 17
- Championship date: December 17, 1994
- Championship site: Marshall University Stadium; Huntington, West Virginia
- Champion: Youngstown State

NCAA Division I-AA football seasons
- «1993 1995»

The 1994 NCAA Division I-AA football season, part of college football in the United States organized by the National Collegiate Athletic Association at the Division I-AA level, began in August 1994, and concluded with the 1994 NCAA Division I-AA Football Championship Game on December 17, 1994, at Marshall University Stadium in Huntington, West Virginia. The defending champion Youngstown State Penguins won their third I-AA championship, defeating the Boise State Broncos by a score of 28−14. It was the fourth consecutive year that Youngstown State played in the I-AA title game.

== Conference changes and new programs ==
School	1993 Conference	1994 Conference
California–Davis	American West	D-II Independent
Duquesne	I-AA Independent	MAAC
Marist	I-AA Independent	MAAC
Northeast Louisiana	Southland	I-A Independent
Robert Morris	New program	I-AA Independent

== Conference standings ==
1994 American West Conference football standings
	Conf.					Overall
Team	W		L		T	W		L		T
Cal Poly $	3	–	0	–	0	7	–	4	–	0
Sacramento State	2	–	1	–	0	5	–	5	–	0
Southern Utah	1	–	2	–	0	4	–	7	–	0
Cal State Northridge	0	–	3	–	0	3	–	7	–	0
$ – Conference champion

1994 Big Sky Conference football standings
	Conf.					Overall
Team	W		L		T	W		L		T
No. 3 Boise State $^	6	–	1	–	0	13	–	2	–	0
No. 6 Idaho ^	5	–	2	–	0	9	–	3	–	0
No. 8 Montana ^	5	–	2	–	0	11	–	3	–	0
No. 25 Northern Arizona	4	–	3	–	0	7	–	4	–	0
Idaho State	4	–	3	–	0	6	–	5	–	0
Weber State	2	–	5	–	0	5	–	6	–	0
Eastern Washington	2	–	5	–	0	4	–	7	–	0
Montana State	0	–	7	–	0	3	–	8	–	0
$ – Conference champion; ^ – NCAA Division I-AA playoff participant; Rankings from The Sports Network poll

1994 Gateway Football Conference standings
	Conf.					Overall
Team	W		L		T	W		L		T
No. 11 Northern Iowa $^	6	–	0	–	0	8	–	4	–	0
No. 24 Western Illinois	4	–	2	–	0	8	–	3	–	0
Eastern Illinois	4	–	2	–	0	6	–	5	–	0
Illinois State	3	–	3	–	0	5	–	5	–	1
Indiana State	2	–	4	–	0	5	–	6	–	0
Southwest Missouri State	2	–	4	–	0	4	–	7	–	0
Southern Illinois	0	–	6	–	0	1	–	10	–	0
$ – Conference champion; ^ – NCAA Division I-AA playoff participant; Rankings from The Sports Network poll

1994 Ivy League football standings
	Conf.					Overall
Team	W		L		T	W		L		T
No. 14 Penn $	7	–	0	–	0	9	–	0	–	0
Brown	4	–	3	–	0	7	–	3	–	0
Princeton	4	–	3	–	0	7	–	3	–	0
Cornell	3	–	4	–	0	6	–	4	–	0
Columbia	3	–	4	–	0	5	–	4	–	1
Yale	3	–	4	–	0	5	–	5	–	0
Dartmouth	2	–	5	–	0	4	–	6	–	0
Harvard	2	–	5	–	0	4	–	6	–	0
$ – Conference champion; Rankings from The Sports Network poll

1994 Metro Atlantic Athletic Conference football standings
	Conf.					Overall
Team	W		L		T	W		L		T
St. John's +	6	–	1	–	0	10	–	1	–	0
Marist +	6	–	1	–	0	7	–	3	–	0
Duquesne	4	–	3	–	0	6	–	4	–	0
Georgetown	4	–	3	–	0	5	–	4	–	0
Iona	3	–	4	–	0	3	–	6	–	0
Siena	3	–	4	–	0	3	–	6	–	0
Canisius	2	–	5	–	0	2	–	8	–	0
Saint Peter's	0	–	7	–	0	0	–	9	–	0
+ – Conference co-champions

1994 Mid-Eastern Athletic Conference football standings
	Conf.					Overall
Team	W		L		T	W		L		T
No. 22 South Carolina State $	6	–	0	–	0	10	–	2	–	0
Delaware State	4	–	2	–	0	7	–	4	–	0
North Carolina A&T	3	–	3	–	0	6	–	5	–	0
Bethune–Cookman	3	–	3	–	0	5	–	6	–	0
Florida A&M	2	–	4	–	0	6	–	5	–	0
Morgan State	2	–	4	–	0	3	–	8	–	0
Howard	1	–	5	–	0	4	–	7	–	0
$ – Conference champion; Rankings from The Sports Network poll

1994 Ohio Valley Conference football standings
	Conf.					Overall
Team	W		L		T	W		L		T
No. 4 Eastern Kentucky $^	8	–	0	–	0	8	–	4	–	0
No. 16 Middle Tennessee ^	7	–	1	–	0	8	–	3	–	1
Southeast Missouri State	5	–	3	–	0	7	–	5	–	0
Tennessee State	4	–	4	–	0	5	–	6	–	0
Murray State	4	–	4	–	0	5	–	6	–	0
Tennessee Tech	3	–	5	–	0	5	–	6	–	0
Austin Peay	3	–	5	–	0	4	–	7	–	0
Tennessee–Martin	2	–	6	–	0	5	–	6	–	0
Morehead State	0	–	8	–	0	0	–	11	–	0
$ – Conference champion; ^ – NCAA Division I-AA playoff participant; Rankings from The Sports Network poll

1994 Patriot League football standings
	Conf.					Overall
Team	W		L		T	W		L		T
Lafayette $	5	–	0	–	0	5	–	6	–	0
Lehigh	3	–	2	–	0	5	–	5	–	1
Holy Cross	3	–	2	–	0	3	–	8	–	0
Bucknell	2	–	3	–	0	5	–	6	–	0
Colgate	2	–	3	–	0	3	–	8	–	0
Fordham	0	–	5	–	0	0	–	11	–	0
$ – Conference champion

1994 Pioneer Football League standings
	Conf.			Overall
Team	W		L	W		L
Dayton +	4	–	1	8	–	2
Butler +	4	–	1	7	–	3
Drake	3	–	2	7	–	3
Valparaiso	2	–	3	7	–	3
San Diego	2	–	3	6	–	4
Evansville	0	–	5	4	–	6
+ – Conference co-champions

1994 Southern Conference football standings
	Conf.					Overall
Team	W		L		T	W		L		T
No. 2 Marshall $^	7	–	1	–	0	12	–	2	–	0
No. 17 Appalachian State ^	6	–	2	–	0	9	–	4	–	0
Georgia Southern	5	–	3	–	0	6	–	5	–	0
Western Carolina	5	–	3	–	0	6	–	5	–	0
The Citadel	4	–	4	–	0	6	–	5	–	0
East Tennessee State	4	–	4	–	0	6	–	5	–	0
Furman	2	–	6	–	0	3	–	8	–	0
Chattanooga	2	–	6	–	0	3	–	8	–	0
VMI	1	–	7	–	0	1	–	10	–	0
$ – Conference champion; ^ – NCAA Division I-AA playoff participant; Rankings from The Sports Network poll

1994 Southland Conference football standings
	Conf.					Overall
Team	W		L		T	W		L		T
No. 18 North Texas $^	5	–	0	–	1	7	–	4	–	1
No. 5 McNeese State ^	5	–	1	–	0	10	–	3	–	0
No. 21 Stephen F. Austin	4	–	1	–	1	6	–	3	–	2
Northwestern State	3	–	3	–	0	5	–	6	–	0
Sam Houston State	1	–	5	–	0	6	–	5	–	0
Nicholls State	1	–	5	–	0	5	–	6	–	0
Southwest Texas State	1	–	5	–	0	4	–	7	–	0
$ – Conference champion; ^ – NCAA Division I-AA playoff participant; Rankings from The Sports Network poll

1994 Southwestern Athletic Conference football standings
	Conf.					Overall
Team	W		L		T	W		L		T
No. 7 Grambling State +	6	–	1	–	0	9	–	3	–	0
No. 15 Alcorn State +^	6	–	1	–	0	8	–	3	–	1
Southern	5	–	2	–	0	6	–	5	–	0
Jackson State	4	–	3	–	0	7	–	4	–	0
Alabama State	3	–	4	–	0	6	–	5	–	0
Mississippi Valley State	2	–	5	–	0	4	–	6	–	0
Texas Southern	2	–	5	–	0	4	–	7	–	0
Prairie View A&M	0	–	7	–	0	0	–	11	–	0
+ – Conference co-champions; ^ – NCAA Division I-AA playoff participant; Rankings from The Sports Network poll

1994 Yankee Conference football standings
	Conf.					Overall
Team	W		L		T	W		L		T
New England Division
No. 12 New Hampshire x$^	8	–	0	–	0	10	–	2	–	0
No. 9 Boston University ^	6	–	2	–	0	9	–	3	–	0
Connecticut	4	–	4	–	0	4	–	7	–	0
UMass	4	–	4	–	0	5	–	6	–	0
Rhode Island	2	–	6	–	0	2	–	9	–	0
Maine	2	–	6	–	0	3	–	8	–	0
Mid-Atlantic Division
No. 13 James Madison x^	6	–	2	–	0	10	–	3	–	0
No. 19 William & Mary x	6	–	2	–	0	8	–	3	–	0
Delaware	5	–	3	–	0	7	–	3	–	1
Villanova	2	–	6	–	0	5	–	6	–	0
Northeastern	2	–	6	–	0	2	–	9	–	0
Richmond	1	–	7	–	0	3	–	8	–	0
$ – Conference champion; x – Division champion/co-champions; ^ – NCAA Division I-AA playoff participant; Rankings from The Sports Network poll

1994 NCAA Division I-AA independents football standings
	Conf.			Overall
Team	W	L	T	W		L		T
No. 1 Youngstown State ^		–		11	–	0	–	1
No. 23 Hofstra		–		8	–	1	–	1
Towson State		–		8	–	2	–	0
No. 10 Troy State ^		–		8	–	4	–	0
Robert Morris		–		7	–	1	–	1
Monmouth		–		7	–	2	–	0
Saint Mary's		–		7	–	3	–	0
UAB		–		7	–	4	–	0
No. 20 UCF		–		7	–	4	–	0
Wagner		–		6	–	5	–	0
Liberty		–		5	–	6	–	0
Western Kentucky		–		5	–	6	–	0
Central Connecticut State		–		4	–	6	–	0
Samford		–		4	–	6	–	1
Davidson		–		3	–	7	–	0
Buffalo		–		3	–	8	–	0
Saint Francis (PA)		–		2	–	7	–	1
Charleston Southern		–		0	–	11	–	0
^ – NCAA Division I-AA playoff participant; Rankings from The Sports Network poll

== Conference champions ==
Conference Champions

American West Conference – Cal Poly
Big Sky Conference – Boise State
Gateway Football Conference – Northern Iowa
Ivy League – Penn
Metro Atlantic Athletic Conference – Marist and St. John's
Mid-Eastern Athletic Conference – South Carolina State
Ohio Valley Conference – Eastern Kentucky
Patriot League – Lafayette
Pioneer Football League – Butler and Dayton
Southern Conference – Marshall
Southland Conference – North Texas
Southwestern Athletic Conference – Alcorn State and Grambling State
Yankee Conference – New Hampshire

== Postseason ==
=== NCAA Division I-AA playoff bracket ===
Only the top four teams in the bracket were seeded. The site of the title game, Marshall University Stadium, had been determined in March 1994.

First Round; November 26; Campus sites
Alcorn State	20
(1) Youngstown State*	63
Boston University	23
Eastern Kentucky*	30
Idaho	21
(4) McNeese State*	38
Northern Iowa	21
Montana*	23
Middle Tennessee	14
(2) Marshall*	49
Troy State	26
James Madison*	45
North Texas	20
(3) Boise State*	24
Appalachian State	17*
New Hampshire*	10

Quarterfinals; December 3 Campus sites
(1) Youngstown State*	18
Eastern Kentucky	15
(4) McNeese State	28
Montana*	30
(2) Marshall*	28*
James Madison	21
(3) Boise State*	17
Appalachian State	14

Semifinals; December 10; Campus sites
(1) Youngstown State*	28
Montana	9
(2) Marshall	24
(3) Boise State*	28

National Championship Game; December 17; Marshall University Stadium; Huntington, West Virginia
(1) Youngstown State	28
(3) Boise State	14

* By team name denotes host institution
* By score denotes overtime periods
