= 1994 NCAA Division I-AA football rankings =

The 1994 NCAA Division I-AA football rankings are from the Sports Network poll of Division I-AA head coaches, athletic directors, sports information directors and media members. This is for the 1994 season.

== Legend ==
	Increase in ranking
	Decrease in ranking
	Not ranked previous week
(#–#)	Win–loss record
(Italics)	Number of first place votes
т	Tied with team above or below also with this symbol

== The Sports Network poll ==
	Preseason	Week 1 Sept 7	Week 2 Sept 14	Week 3 Sept 21	Week 4 Sept 28	Week 5 Oct 5	Week 6 Oct 12	Week 7 Oct 19	Week 8 Oct 26	Week 9 Nov 2	Week 10 Nov 9	Week 11 Nov 16	Week 12 Nov 22	
1.	Marshall (29)	Marshall (1–0) (53)	Marshall (2–0) (59)	Marshall (3–0) (68)	Marshall (4–0) (59)	Marshall (5–0) (59)	Marshall (6–0) (54)	Marshall (7–0) (61)	Montana (7–0) (49)	Montana (8–0) (59)	Youngstown State (8–0–1) (53)	Youngstown State (9–0–1) (60)	Youngstown State (10–0–1) (59)	1.
2.	Youngstown State (29)	McNeese State (1–0) (2)	McNeese State (2–0) (1)	McNeese State (3–0) (1)	McNeese State (4–0) (1)	Montana (5–0) (4)	Montana (6–0) (6)	Montana (6–0) (5)	Youngstown State (6–0–1) (8)	Youngstown State (7–0–1) (8)	Marshall (9–1) (3)	Marshall (10–1) (4)	Marshall (10–1) (3)	2.
3.	Georgia Southern (2)	Northern Iowa (1–0) (5)	Montana (2–0) (3)	Montana (3–0) (4)	Montana (4–0) (4)	Youngstown State (4–0–1) (3)	Youngstown State (5–0–1) (3)	Youngstown State (6–0–1) (3)	Idaho (7–0) (8)	Troy State (7–1)	Grambling State (9–0) (54)	Idaho (9–1) (3)	Boise State (10–1) (1)	3.
4.	McNeese State (3)	Montana (1–0) (1)	Youngstown State (1–0–1) (1)	Troy State (3–0)	Troy State (3–0) (1)	Idaho (4–0)	Idaho (5–0)	Idaho (6–0)	Troy State (6–1)	Marshall (8–1)	Idaho (8–1) (2)	Boston University (9–1) (3)	Eastern Kentucky (9–2)	4.
5.	Montana (4)	Youngstown State (0–0–1) (2)	Troy State (1–0) (1)	Youngstown State (2–0–1) (1)	Youngstown State (3–0–1) (2)	McNeese State (4–1)	McNeese State (4–1)	Troy State (5–1)	Marshall (7–1) (1)	Grambling State (8–0) (1)	Montana (8–1)	James Madison (9–1)	McNeese State (9–2)	5.
6.	Troy State (6)	UCF (1–0) (2)	Idaho (1–0)	Boston University (2–0) (1)	Idaho (3–0)	UCF (4–1)	Troy State (4–1)	Grambling State (6–0)	Grambling State (7–0) (2)	Idaho (7–1)	Troy State (7–2)	Boise State (9–1)	Idaho (9–2)	6.
7.	UCF (4)	Troy State (0–0) (1)	Boston University (1–0)	Idaho (2–0)	Boston University (3–0) (2)	Troy State (3–1)	William & Mary (5–1)	Boston University (5–1)	Northern Iowa (5–2)	Boston University (7–1) (1)	Boston University (8–1) (1)	Eastern Kentucky (8–2)	Grambling State (9–1)	7.
8.	Northern Iowa (2)	Idaho (1–0)	William & Mary (2–0) (1)	William & Mary (3–0) (1)	William & Mary (4–0) (1)	William & Mary (4–1)	Grambling State (5–0)	Northern Iowa (4–2)	Boston University (6–1)	Northern Iowa (6–2)	Eastern Kentucky (8–2)	McNeese State (8–2)	Montana (9–2)	8.
9.	Boston University (1)	Georgia Southern (0–1)	Northern Iowa (1–1)	Northern Iowa (2–1)	UCF (3–1)	Grambling State (4–0)	Northern Iowa (4–2)	Eastern Kentucky (5–2)	Eastern Kentucky (6–2)	Eastern Kentucky (7–2)	James Madison (8–1)	Grambling State (9–1)	Boston University (9–2)	9.
10.	Idaho	Boston University (0–0)	Southern (2–0)	Southern (3–0)	Southern (3–0)	Western Kentucky (4–1)	Boston University (4–1)	McNeese State (4–2)	James Madison (6–1)	James Madison (7–1)	Boise State (8–1) (1)	Appalachian State (8–2) (1)	Troy State (8–3)	10.
11.	Delaware	Stephen F. Austin (0–0–1)	Western Kentucky (2–0)	Western Kentucky (3–0)	Tennessee Tech (3–1)	Northern Iowa (3–2)	Boise State (6–0)	UCF (5–2)	McNeese State (5–2)	McNeese State (6–2)	McNeese State (7–2)	Montana (8–2)	Northern Iowa (8–3)	11.
12.	Eastern Kentucky	Delaware (0–0)	UCF (1–0–1)	Alcorn State (2–1)	Grambling State (3–0)	Boston University (3–1)	Eastern Kentucky (4–2)	James Madison (5–1)	North Texas (5–2)	North Texas (6–2)	Appalachian State (7–2) (1)	Troy State (7–3)	New Hampshire (10–1)	12.
13.	Alcorn State	Middle Tennessee State (1–0)	Montana State (2–0)	UCF (2–1)	Northern Iowa (2–2)	Eastern Kentucky (3–2)	Penn (3–0)	Penn (4–0)	Penn (5–0)	Appalachian State (6–2) (1)	Penn (7–0)	Penn (8–0)	James Madison (9–2)	13.
14.	Howard (1)	Howard (1–0)	Eastern Kentucky (1–1)	Western Carolina (2–1)	Western Kentucky (3–1)	Penn (2–0)	Southern (4–1)	William & Mary (5–2)	Boise State (7–1)	Penn (6–0)	Northern Iowa (6–3)	Northern Iowa (7–3)	Penn (9–0)	14.
15.	Stephen F. Austin	Southern (1–0)	Alcorn State (1–1)	Stephen F. Austin (1–1–1)	Penn (2–0)	Southern (3–1)	UCF (4–2)	North Texas (4–2)	Appalachian State (5–2) (1)	Boise State (7–1)	North Texas (6–2–1)	North Texas (7–2–1)	Alcorn State (8–2–1)	15.
16.	Middle Tennessee State	Tennessee Tech (1–0)	Stephen F. Austin (0–1–1)	Tennessee Tech (2–1)	Northern Arizona (3–1)	Boise State (5–0)	Western Carolina (4–2)	Western Kentucky (5–2)	Stephen F. Austin (4–2–1)	UCF (6–3)	UCF (6–3)	Alcorn State (7–2–1)	Middle Tennessee State (8–2–1)	16.
17.	Western Carolina	Western Carolina (1–0)	Western Carolina (1–1)	Grambling State (2–0)	Eastern Kentucky (2–2)	Western Carolina (3–2)	James Madison (4–1)	Boise State (6–1)	UCF (5–3)	Middle Tennessee State (6–2)	Middle Tennessee State (7–2)	New Hampshire (9–1)	Appalachian State (8–3)	17.
18.	Tennessee Tech	William & Mary (1–0) (1)	Tennessee Tech (1–1)	Penn (1–0)	Delaware (2–1)	Sam Houston State (5–0)	Appalachian State (4–1)	Stephen F. Austin (3–2–1)	Alcorn State (6–2)	Western Carolina (6–3)	Western Carolina (6–3)	Middle Tennessee State (7–2–1)	North Texas (7–3–1)	18.
19.	Penn	Western Kentucky (1–0)	James Madison (2–0)	Eastern Kentucky (1–2)	Western Carolina (2–2)	James Madison (3–1)	Western Kentucky (4–2)	Alcorn State (5–2)	Middle Tennessee State (5–2)	New Hampshire (7–1)	New Hampshire (8–1)	William & Mary (7–3)	William & Mary (8–3)	19.
20.	Southern	Penn (0–0)	Penn (0–0)	Delaware (1–1)	Middle Tennessee State (2–1)	Tennessee Tech (3–2)	Stephen F. Austin (2–2–1)	Middle Tennessee State (4–2)	Hofstra (7–0)	William & Mary (6–3)	William & Mary (7–3)	UCF (6–4)	UCF (7–4)	20.
21.	William & Mary	Eastern Kentucky (0–1)	Georgia Southern (0–2)	Montana State (2–1)	New Hampshire (3–0)	Appalachian State (3–1)	Alcorn State (4–2)	Hofstra (6–0)	Western Carolina (5–3)	Alcorn State (6–2–1)	Alcorn State (6–2–1)	Stephen F. Austin (5–3–2)	Stephen F. Austin (6–3–2)	21.
22.	Illinois State	Alcorn State (0–1)	Grambling State (2–0)	Middle Tennessee State (1–1)	Alcorn State (2–2)	Alcorn State (3–2)	Hofstra (6–0)	Southern (4–2)	New Hampshire (6–1)	Stephen F. Austin (4–3–1)	Stephen F. Austin (4–3–2)	Hofstra (8–1–1)	South Carolina State (9–2)	22.
23.	UMass	Grambling State (1–0)	Middle Tennessee State (1–1)	Northern Arizona (1–1)	Stephen F. Austin (1–2–1)	Northern Arizona (3–2)	Middle Tennessee State (3–2)	Western Carolina (4–3)	William & Mary (5–3)	Hofstra (7–1)	Hofstra (8–1)	Western Carolina (6–4)	Hofstra (8–1–1)	23.
24.	Northern Arizona	Montana State (1–0)	Delaware (0–1)	James Madison (2–1)	Sam Houston State (4–0)	Stephen F. Austin (1–2–1)	North Texas (3–2)	Appalachian State (4–2)	Western Kentucky (5–3)	Northwestern State (5–3)	Georgia Southern (5–4)	Georgia Southern (6–4)	Western Illinois (8–3)	24.
25.	Montana State	UMass (0–0)	Howard (1–1)	Howard (1–1)	Boise State (4–0)	Middle Tennessee State (2–2)	Sam Houston State (5–1)	New Hampshire (5–1)	Cornell (6–0) (1)	Georgia Southern (4–4)	South Carolina State (7–2)	South Carolina State (8–2)	Northern Arizona (7–4)	25.
	Preseason	Week 1 Sept 7	Week 2 Sept 14	Week 3 Sept 21	Week 4 Sept 28	Week 5 Oct 5	Week 6 Oct 12	Week 7 Oct 19	Week 8 Oct 26	Week 9 Nov 2	Week 10 Nov 9	Week 11 Nov 16	Week 12 Nov 22	
		Dropped: 22 Illinois State; 24 Northern Arizona	Dropped: 25 UMass	Dropped: 21 Georgia Southern	Dropped: 21 Montana State; 24 James Madison; 25 Howard	Dropped: 18 Delaware; 21 New Hampshire	Dropped: 20 Tennessee Tech; 23 Northern Arizona	Dropped: 25 Sam Houston State	Dropped: 22 Southern	Dropped: 24 Western Kentucky; 25 Cornell	Dropped: 24 Northwestern State	None	Dropped: 23 Western Carolina; 24 Georgia Southern	
