= List of Big West Conference football standings =

This is a list of yearly Big West Conference football standings.

== Big West standings ==
=== Pacific Coast Athletic Association standings (1969–1987) ===
1969 Pacific Coast Athletic Association football standings
	Conf.					Overall
Team	W		L		T	W		L		T
San Diego State $	6	–	0	–	0	11	–	0	–	0
Long Beach State	3	–	1	–	0	8	–	3	–	0
Pacific (CA)	2	–	2	–	0	7	–	3	–	0
San Jose State	1	–	1	–	0	2	–	8	–	0
UC Santa Barbara	1	–	3	–	0	6	–	4	–	0
Fresno State	1	–	3	–	0	6	–	4	–	0
Cal State Los Angeles	0	–	4	–	0	0	–	9	–	0
$ – Conference champion

1970 Pacific Coast Athletic Association football standings
	Conf.					Overall
Team	W		L		T	W		L		T
San Diego State +	5	–	1	–	0	9	–	2	–	0
Long Beach State +	5	–	1	–	0	9	–	2	–	1
Fresno State	4	–	2	–	0	8	–	4	–	0
Pacific (CA)	2	–	3	–	0	5	–	6	–	0
San Jose State	2	–	3	–	0	2	–	9	–	0
UC Santa Barbara	1	–	5	–	0	2	–	9	–	0
Cal State Los Angeles	0	–	4	–	0	1	–	9	–	0
+ – Conference co-champions

1971 Pacific Coast Athletic Association football standings
	Conf.					Overall
Team	W		L		T	W		L		T
Long Beach State $	5	–	1	–	0	8	–	4	–	0
San Jose State	4	–	1	–	0	5	–	6	–	1
Fresno State	3	–	2	–	0	6	–	5	–	0
San Diego State	2	–	3	–	0	6	–	5	–	0
UC Santa Barbara	2	–	3	–	0	3	–	8	–	0
Pacific (CA)	1	–	4	–	0	3	–	8	–	0
Cal State Los Angeles	0	–	3	–	0	2	–	8	–	0
$ – Conference champion

1972 Pacific Coast Athletic Association football standings
	Conf.					Overall
Team	W		L		T	W		L		T
San Diego State $	4	–	0	–	0	10	–	1	–	0
Pacific (CA)	3	–	1	–	0	8	–	3	–	0
Fresno State	1	–	3	–	0	6	–	4	–	1
Long Beach State	1	–	3	–	0	5	–	6	–	0
San Jose State	1	–	3	–	0	4	–	7	–	0
Cal State Los Angeles*	0	–	0	–	0	3	–	7	–	0
$ – Conference champion; * – Did not compete for conference title

1973 Pacific Coast Athletic Association football standings
	Conf.					Overall
Team	W		L		T	W		L		T
San Diego State $	3	–	0	–	1	9	–	1	–	1
San Jose State	2	–	0	–	2	5	–	4	–	2
Pacific (CA)	2	–	1	–	1	7	–	2	–	1
Fresno State	1	–	3	–	0	2	–	9	–	0
Long Beach State	0	–	4	–	0	1	–	9	–	1
$ – Conference champion

1974 Pacific Coast Athletic Association football standings
	Conf.					Overall
Team	W		L		T	W		L		T
San Diego State $	4	–	0	–	0	8	–	2	–	1
San Jose State	2	–	2	–	0	8	–	3	–	1
Pacific (CA)	2	–	2	–	0	6	–	5	–	0
Long Beach State	1	–	3	–	0	6	–	5	–	0
Fresno State	1	–	3	–	0	5	–	7	–	0
Cal State Fullerton	0	–	0	–	0	4	–	6	–	0
$ – Conference champion

1975 Pacific Coast Athletic Association football standings
	Conf.					Overall
Team	W		L		T	W		L		T
San Jose State $	5	–	0	–	0	9	–	2	–	0
Long Beach State	4	–	1	–	0	9	–	2	–	0
San Diego State	3	–	2	–	0	8	–	3	–	0
Pacific (CA)	2	–	3	–	0	5	–	6	–	1
Fresno State	1	–	4	–	0	3	–	8	–	0
Cal State Fullerton	0	–	5	–	0	2	–	9	–	0
$ – Conference champion

1976 Pacific Coast Athletic Association football standings
	Conf.					Overall
Team	W		L		T	W		L		T
San Jose State $	4	–	0	–	0	7	–	4	–	0
Fresno State	3	–	1	–	0	5	–	6	–	0
Long Beach State	2	–	2	–	0	8	–	3	–	0
Cal State Fullerton	1	–	3	–	0	3	–	7	–	1
Pacific (CA)	0	–	4	–	0	2	–	9	–	0
$ – Conference champion

1977 Pacific Coast Athletic Association football standings
	Conf.					Overall
Team	W		L		T	W		L		T
Fresno State $	4	–	0	–	0	9	–	2	–	0
Pacific (CA)	3	–	1	–	0	6	–	5	–	0
San Jose State	2	–	2	–	0	4	–	7	–	0
Long Beach State	1	–	3	–	0	4	–	6	–	0
Cal State Fullerton	0	–	4	–	0	4	–	7	–	0
$ – Conference champion

1978 Pacific Coast Athletic Association football standings
	Conf.					Overall
Team	W		L		T	W		L		T
Utah State +	4	–	1	–	0	7	–	4	–	0
San Jose State +	4	–	1	–	0	7	–	5	–	0
Pacific (CA)	3	–	2	–	0	4	–	8	–	0
Cal State Fullerton	2	–	2	–	0	5	–	7	–	0
Long Beach State	1	–	4	–	0	5	–	6	–	0
Fresno State	1	–	4	–	0	3	–	8	–	0
+ – Conference co-champions; Utah State's game against Wyoming counted in the conference standings.

1979 Pacific Coast Athletic Association football standings
	Conf.					Overall
Team	W		L		T	W		L		T
Utah State $	5	–	0	–	0	8	–	3	–	0
Long Beach State	3	–	2	–	0	7	–	4	–	0
Fresno State	3	–	2	–	0	5	–	6	–	0
Cal State Fullerton	2	–	3	–	0	4	–	7	–	0
San Jose State	2	–	3	–	0	3	–	8	–	0
Pacific (CA)	0	–	5	–	0	3	–	7	–	0
$ – Conference champion; Records adjusted for San Jose State forfeits

1980 Pacific Coast Athletic Association football standings
	Conf.					Overall
Team	W		L		T	W		L		T
Long Beach State $	5	–	0	–	0	8	–	3	–	0
Utah State	4	–	1	–	0	6	–	5	–	0
San Jose State	3	–	2	–	0	7	–	4	–	0
Fresno State	1	–	4	–	0	5	–	6	–	0
Cal State Fullerton	1	–	4	–	0	4	–	7	–	0
Pacific (CA)	1	–	4	–	0	4	–	8	–	0
$ – Conference champion

1981 Pacific Coast Athletic Association football standings
	Conf.					Overall
Team	W		L		T	W		L		T
San Jose State $	5	–	0	–	0	9	–	3	–	0
Utah State	4	–	1	–	1	5	–	5	–	1
Fresno State	2	–	3	–	0	5	–	6	–	0
Pacific (CA)	2	–	3	–	0	5	–	6	–	0
Cal State Fullerton	1	–	4	–	0	3	–	8	–	0
Long Beach State	1	–	4	–	0	2	–	8	–	0
$ – Conference champion

1982 Pacific Coast Athletic Association football standings
	Conf.					Overall
Team	W		L		T	W		L		T
Fresno State $	6	–	0	–	0	11	–	1	–	0
Long Beach State	5	–	1	–	0	6	–	5	–	0
San Jose State	4	–	2	–	0	8	–	3	–	0
Utah State	2	–	3	–	0	5	–	6	–	0
Pacific (CA)	2	–	4	–	0	2	–	9	–	0
UNLV	1	–	4	–	0	3	–	8	–	0
Cal State Fullerton	0	–	6	–	0	3	–	9	–	0
$ – Conference champion

1983 Pacific Coast Athletic Association football standings
	Conf.					Overall
Team	W		L		T	W		L		T
Cal State Fullerton $	6	–	0	–	0	8	–	4	–	0
Utah State	4	–	2	–	0	6	–	5	–	0
Long Beach State	3	–	3	–	0	8	–	4	–	0
Fresno State	3	–	3	–	0	7	–	4	–	0
San Jose State	3	–	3	–	0	5	–	6	–	0
Pacific (CA)	2	–	4	–	0	4	–	8	–	0
UNLV	0	–	6	–	0	0	–	11	–	0
$ – Conference champion; Records adjusted for UNLV's forfeit of all 7 victories

1984 Pacific Coast Athletic Association football standings
	Conf.					Overall
Team	W		L		T	W		L		T
Cal State Fullerton $	7	–	0	–	0	12	–	0	–	0
San Jose State	6	–	1	–	0	7	–	4	–	0
Fresno State	4	–	3	–	0	7	–	5	–	0
Long Beach State	4	–	3	–	0	5	–	6	–	0
Pacific (CA)	3	–	4	–	0	5	–	6	–	0
Utah State	2	–	5	–	0	2	–	9	–	0
New Mexico State	1	–	6	–	0	2	–	9	–	0
UNLV	0	–	7	–	0	0	–	13	–	0
$ – Conference champion; Records adjusted for UNLV's forfeit of all 11 victories

1985 Pacific Coast Athletic Association football standings
	Conf.					Overall
Team	W		L		T	W		L		T
No. 16 Fresno State $	7	–	0	–	0	11	–	0	–	1
Cal State Fullerton	5	–	2	–	0	6	–	5	–	0
UNLV	4	–	2	–	1	5	–	5	–	1
Long Beach State	4	–	3	–	0	6	–	6	–	0
Utah State	3	–	4	–	0	3	–	8	–	0
San Jose State	2	–	4	–	1	2	–	8	–	1
Pacific (CA)	2	–	5	–	0	5	–	7	–	0
New Mexico State	0	–	7	–	0	1	–	10	–	0
$ – Conference champion; Rankings from Coaches Poll

1986 Pacific Coast Athletic Association football standings
	Conf.					Overall
Team	W		L		T	W		L		T
San Jose State $	7	–	0	–	0	10	–	2	–	0
Fresno State	6	–	1	–	0	9	–	2	–	0
Long Beach State	4	–	3	–	0	6	–	5	–	0
UNLV	3	–	4	–	0	6	–	5	–	0
Utah State	3	–	4	–	0	3	–	8	–	0
Pacific (CA)	2	–	5	–	0	4	–	7	–	0
Cal State Fullerton	2	–	5	–	0	3	–	9	–	0
New Mexico State	1	–	6	–	0	1	–	10	–	0
$ – Conference champion

1987 Pacific Coast Athletic Association football standings
	Conf.					Overall
Team	W		L		T	W		L		T
San Jose State $	7	–	0	–	0	10	–	2	–	0
Fresno State	4	–	3	–	0	6	–	5	–	0
Cal State Fullerton	4	–	3	–	0	6	–	6	–	0
UNLV	4	–	3	–	0	5	–	6	–	0
Utah State	4	–	3	–	0	5	–	6	–	0
Pacific (CA)	3	–	4	–	0	4	–	7	–	0
Long Beach State	2	–	5	–	0	4	–	7	–	0
New Mexico State	0	–	7	–	0	2	–	9	–	0
$ – Conference champion

=== Big West Conference standings (1988–2000) ===
1988 Big West Conference football standings
	Conf.					Overall
Team	W		L		T	W		L		T
Fresno State $	7	–	0	–	0	10	–	2	–	0
Cal State Fullerton	5	–	2	–	0	5	–	6	–	0
Utah State	4	–	3	–	0	4	–	7	–	0
San Jose State	4	–	3	–	0	4	–	8	–	0
UNLV	3	–	4	–	0	4	–	7	–	0
Long Beach State	3	–	4	–	0	3	–	9	–	0
Pacific (CA)	2	–	5	–	0	2	–	9	–	0
New Mexico State	0	–	7	–	0	1	–	10	–	0
$ – Conference champion

1989 Big West Conference football standings
	Conf.					Overall
Team	W		L		T	W		L		T
Fresno State $	7	–	0	–	0	11	–	1	–	0
Cal State Fullerton	5	–	2	–	0	6	–	4	–	1
San Jose State	5	–	2	–	0	6	–	5	–	0
Utah State	4	–	3	–	0	4	–	7	–	0
UNLV	3	–	4	–	0	4	–	7	–	0
Long Beach State	2	–	5	–	0	4	–	8	–	0
Pacific (CA)	2	–	5	–	0	2	–	10	–	0
New Mexico State	0	–	7	–	0	0	–	11	–	0
$ – Conference champion

1990 Big West Conference football standings
	Conf.					Overall
Team	W		L		T	W		L		T
San Jose State $	7	–	0	–	0	9	–	2	–	1
Fresno State	5	–	1	–	1	8	–	2	–	1
Utah State	5	–	1	–	1	5	–	5	–	1
Long Beach State	4	–	3	–	0	6	–	5	–	0
UNLV	3	–	4	–	0	4	–	7	–	0
Pacific (CA)	2	–	5	–	0	4	–	7	–	0
New Mexico State	1	–	6	–	0	1	–	10	–	0
Cal State Fullerton	0	–	7	–	0	1	–	11	–	0
$ – Conference champion

1991 Big West Conference football standings
	Conf.					Overall
Team	W		L		T	W		L		T
Fresno State +	6	–	1	–	0	10	–	2	–	0
San Jose State +	6	–	1	–	0	6	–	4	–	1
Utah State	5	–	2	–	0	5	–	6	–	0
Pacific (CA)	4	–	3	–	0	5	–	7	–	0
UNLV	2	–	5	–	0	4	–	7	–	0
Long Beach State	2	–	5	–	0	2	–	9	–	0
New Mexico State	2	–	5	–	0	2	–	9	–	0
Cal State Fullerton	1	–	6	–	0	2	–	9	–	0
+ – Conference co-champions

1992 Big West Conference football standings
	Conf.					Overall
Team	W		L		T	W		L		T
Nevada $	5	–	1	–	0	7	–	5	–	0
San Jose State	4	–	2	–	0	7	–	4	–	0
Utah State	4	–	2	–	0	5	–	6	–	0
New Mexico State	3	–	3	–	0	6	–	5	–	0
UNLV	3	–	3	–	0	6	–	5	–	0
Pacific (CA)	2	–	4	–	0	3	–	8	–	0
Cal State Fullerton	0	–	6	–	0	2	–	9	–	0
$ – Conference champion

1993 Big West Conference football standings
	Conf.					Overall
Team	W		L		T	W		L		T
Southwestern Louisiana +	5	–	1	–	0	8	–	3	–	0
Utah State +	5	–	1	–	0	7	–	5	–	0
Nevada	4	–	2	–	0	7	–	4	–	0
New Mexico State	4	–	2	–	0	5	–	6	–	0
Northern Illinois	3	–	3	–	0	4	–	7	–	0
Pacific (CA)	2	–	4	–	0	3	–	8	–	0
UNLV	2	–	4	–	0	3	–	8	–	0
Louisiana Tech	2	–	4	–	0	2	–	9	–	0
San Jose State	2	–	4	–	0	2	–	9	–	0
Arkansas State	1	–	5	–	0	2	–	8	–	1
+ – Conference co-champions

1994 Big West Conference football standings
	Conf.					Overall
Team	W		L		T	W		L		T
Nevada +	5	–	1	–	0	9	–	2	–	0
UNLV +	5	–	1	–	0	7	–	5	–	0
Southwestern Louisiana +	5	–	1	–	0	6	–	5	–	0
Pacific (CA)	4	–	2	–	0	6	–	5	–	0
Northern Illinois	3	–	3	–	0	4	–	7	–	0
San Jose State	3	–	3	–	0	3	–	8	–	0
Utah State	2	–	4	–	0	3	–	8	–	0
New Mexico State	2	–	4	–	0	3	–	8	–	0
Louisiana Tech	1	–	5	–	0	3	–	8	–	0
Arkansas State	0	–	6	–	0	1	–	10	–	0
+ – Conference co-champions

1995 Big West Conference football standings
	Conf.					Overall
Team	W		L		T	W		L		T
Nevada $	7	–	0	–	0	9	–	3	–	0
Southwestern Louisiana	4	–	2	–	0	6	–	5	–	0
Utah State	4	–	3	–	0	4	–	7	–	0
Arkansas State	3	–	3	–	0	6	–	5	–	0
Northern Illinois	3	–	3	–	0	3	–	8	–	0
New Mexico State	3	–	4	–	0	4	–	7	–	0
San Jose State	3	–	4	–	0	3	–	8	–	0
Louisiana Tech	2	–	4	–	0	5	–	6	–	0
Pacific (CA)	2	–	4	–	0	3	–	8	–	0
UNLV	1	–	5	–	0	2	–	9	–	0
$ – Conference champion

1996 Big West Conference football standings
	Conf.			Overall
Team	W		L	W		L
Nevada +	4	–	1	9	–	3
Utah State +	4	–	1	6	–	5
Idaho	3	–	2	6	–	5
North Texas	3	–	2	5	–	6
Boise State	1	–	4	2	–	10
New Mexico State	0	–	5	1	–	10
+ – Conference co-champions

1997 Big West Conference football standings
	Conf.			Overall
Team	W		L	W		L
Utah State +	4	–	1	6	–	6
Nevada +	4	–	1	5	–	6
Boise State	3	–	2	5	–	6
Idaho	2	–	3	5	–	6
North Texas	2	–	3	4	–	7
New Mexico State	0	–	5	2	–	9
+ – Conference co-champions

1998 Big West Conference football standings
	Conf.			Overall
Team	W		L	W		L
Idaho $	4	–	1	9	–	3
Nevada	3	–	2	6	–	5
North Texas	3	–	2	3	–	8
Boise State	2	–	3	6	–	5
Utah State	2	–	3	3	–	8
New Mexico State	1	–	4	3	–	8
$ – Conference champion

1999 Big West Conference football standings
	Conf.			Overall
Team	W		L	W		L
Boise State $	5	–	1	10	–	3
Idaho	4	–	2	7	–	4
New Mexico State	3	–	2	6	–	5
Utah State	3	–	3	4	–	7
Arkansas State	2	–	3	4	–	7
Nevada	2	–	4	3	–	8
North Texas	1	–	5	2	–	9
$ – Conference champion

2000 Big West Conference football standings
	Conf.			Overall
Team	W		L	W		L
Boise State $	5	–	0	10	–	2
Utah State	4	–	1	5	–	6
Idaho	3	–	2	5	–	6
New Mexico State	1	–	4	3	–	8
North Texas	1	–	4	3	–	8
Arkansas State	1	–	4	1	–	10
$ – Conference champion
