= Nelson Stokley =

American football player and coach (1944–2010)

Biographical details
- Born: March 12, 1944; Kenedy, Texas, U.S.
- Died: June 10, 2010 (aged 66); Lafayette, Louisiana, U.S.

Playing career
- 1965–1967: LSU
- Position: Quarterback

Coaching career (HC unless noted)
- 1968: LSU (GA)
- 1969–1971: LSU (freshmen)
- 1972–1978: Virginia Tech (QB)
- 1980–1985: Clemson (OC/QB)
- 1986–1998: Southwestern Louisiana

Administrative career (AD unless noted)
- 1988–1992: Southwestern Louisiana

Head coaching record
- Overall: 62–80–1

Accomplishments and honors

Championships
- 2 Big West (1993, 1994)

Awards
- Second-team All-SEC (1967)

Nelson Stokley (March 12, 1944 – June 5, 2010) was an American college football quarterback and coach. Stokley attended Louisiana State University (LSU) from 1965 to 1967 and helped lead the LSU Tigers to victories in the 1966 Cotton Bowl and the 1968 Sugar Bowl. He was an assistant coach under Danny Ford on the 1981 national champion Clemson Tigers. Stokley was the head coach of the Southwestern Louisiana Ragin' Cajuns from 1986 to 1998 and led the team to a 62–80–1 record. Stokley's 62 win are second most among head coaches in Louisiana Ragin' Cajuns football history, behind Russ Faulkinberry's 66. Stokley and Faulkinberry are tied for the longest tenure as head coach with 13 seasons.

Stokley was also the quarterbacks coach for the Virginia Tech Hokies from 1974 to 1978 and the offensive coordinator for the Clemson Tigers from 1979 to 1985.

Stokley's son, Brandon Stokley, played in the National Football League (NFL).

== Head coaching record ==
Year	Team	Overall	Conference	Standing	Bowl/playoffs
Southwestern Louisiana Ragin' Cajuns (NCAA Division I-A independent) (1986–1992)
1986	Southwestern Louisiana	6–5			
1987	Southwestern Louisiana	6–5			
1988	Southwestern Louisiana	6–5			
1989	Southwestern Louisiana	7–4			
1990	Southwestern Louisiana	5–6			
1991	Southwestern Louisiana	2–8–1			
1992	Southwestern Louisiana	2–9			
Southwestern Louisiana Ragin' Cajuns (Big West Conference) (1993–1995)
1993	Southwestern Louisiana	8–3	5–1	T–1st	
1994	Southwestern Louisiana	6–5	5–1	T–1st	
1995	Southwestern Louisiana	6–5	4–2	2nd	
Southwestern Louisiana Ragin' Cajuns (NCAA Division I-A independent) (1996–1998)
1996	Southwestern Louisiana	5–6			
1997	Southwestern Louisiana	1–10			
1998	Southwestern Louisiana	2–9			
Southwestern Louisiana:		62–80–1	14–4		
Total:		62–80–1			
National championship Conference title Conference division title or championship game berth
