= 1994 Northern Arizona Lumberjacks football team =

American college football season

1994 Northern Arizona Lumberjacks football
- Conference: Big Sky Conference

Ranking
- Sports Network: No. 25
- Record: 7–4 (4–3 Big Sky)
- Head coach: Steve Axman (5th season)
- Home stadium: Walkup Skydome

1994 Big Sky Conference football standings
| | Conf. | | | | | Overall |
| Team | W | | L | | T | W | | L | | T |
|---|---|---|---|---|---|---|---|---|---|---|
| No. 3 Boise State $^ | 6 | – | 1 | – | 0 | 13 | – | 2 | – | 0 |
| No. 6 Idaho ^ | 5 | – | 2 | – | 0 | 9 | – | 3 | – | 0 |
| No. 8 Montana ^ | 5 | – | 2 | – | 0 | 11 | – | 3 | – | 0 |
| No. 25 Northern Arizona | 4 | – | 3 | – | 0 | 7 | – | 4 | – | 0 |
| Idaho State | 4 | – | 3 | – | 0 | 6 | – | 5 | – | 0 |
| Weber State | 2 | – | 5 | – | 0 | 5 | – | 6 | – | 0 |
| Eastern Washington | 2 | – | 5 | – | 0 | 4 | – | 7 | – | 0 |
| Montana State | 0 | – | 7 | – | 0 | 3 | – | 8 | – | 0 |
$ – Conference champion; ^ – NCAA Division I-AA playoff participant; Rankings from The Sports Network poll

The 1994 Northern Arizona Lumberjacks football team represented Northern Arizona University as a member of the Big Sky Conference during the 1994 NCAA Division I-AA football season. Led by fifth-year head coach Steve Axman, the Lumberjacks compiled an overall record of 7–4, with a mark of 4–3 in conference play, and finished tied for fourth in the Big Sky.

== Schedule ==
| Date | Opponent | Rank | Site | Result | Attendance | Source |
|---|---|---|---|---|---|---|
| September 3 | at Nevada* | | Mackay Stadium; Reno, NV | L 27–30 | 20,105 | |
| September 10 | Southern Utah* | | Walkup Skydome; Flagstaff, AZ | W 59–21 | | |
| September 17 | Idaho State | | Walkup Skydome; Flagstaff, AZ | W 41–19 | 8,457 | |
| September 24 | at No. 23 Montana State | No. 21 | Reno H. Sales Stadium; Bozeman, MT | W 47–30 | 11,407 | |
| October 1 | No. 25 Boise State | No. 16 | Walkup Skydome; Flagstaff, AZ | L 16–28 | 12,865 | |
| October 8 | at No. 2 Montana | No. 23 | Washington–Grizzly Stadium; Missoula, MT | L 24–35 | 15,466 | |
| October 15 | Eastern Washington | | Walkup Skydome; Flagstaff, AZ | W 34–21 | | |
| October 22 | at No. 4 Idaho | | Kibbie Dome; Moscow, ID | L 14–41 | 14,252 | |
| October 29 | Weber State | | Walkup Skydome; Flagstaff, AZ | W 24–20 | 9,775 | |
| November 5 | Cal Poly* | | Walkup Skydome; Flagstaff, AZ | W 44–21 | 3,056 | |
| November 12 | at Cal State Northridge* | | North Campus Stadium; Northridge, CA | W 60–7 | 2,018 | |
*Non-conference game; Rankings from The Sports Network Poll released prior to the game
