= 1994 Boise State Broncos football team =

American college football season

1994 Boise State Broncos football

Big Sky champion

NCAA Division I-AA Championship Game, L 14–28 vs. Youngstown State
- Conference: Big Sky Conference

Ranking
- Coaches: No. 2
- Sports Network: No. 3
- Record: 13–2 (6–1 Big Sky)
- Head coach: Pokey Allen (2nd season)
- Offensive coordinator: Al Borges (2nd season)
- Defensive coordinator: Tom Mason (2nd season)
- Home stadium: Bronco Stadium

1994 Big Sky Conference football standings
	Conf.					Overall
Team	W		L		T	W		L		T
No. 3 Boise State $^	6	–	1	–	0	13	–	2	–	0
No. 6 Idaho ^	5	–	2	–	0	9	–	3	–	0
No. 8 Montana ^	5	–	2	–	0	11	–	3	–	0
No. 25 Northern Arizona	4	–	3	–	0	7	–	4	–	0
Idaho State	4	–	3	–	0	6	–	5	–	0
Weber State	2	–	5	–	0	5	–	6	–	0
Eastern Washington	2	–	5	–	0	4	–	7	–	0
Montana State	0	–	7	–	0	3	–	8	–	0
$ – Conference champion; ^ – NCAA Division I-AA playoff participant; Rankings from The Sports Network poll

The 1994 Boise State Broncos football team represented Boise State University in the Big Sky Conference during the 1994 NCAA Division I-AA football season. Led by second-year head coach Pokey Allen, the Broncos played their home games on campus at Bronco Stadium in Boise, Idaho.

== Schedule ==
Date	Time	Opponent	Rank	Site	TV	Result	Attendance	Source
September 3	7:05 pm	Northeastern*		Bronco Stadium; Boise, ID		W 36–26	19,509	
September 10	7:05 pm	Cal State Northridge*		Bronco Stadium; Boise, ID		W 40–19	19,489	
September 17	7:05 pm	Nevada*		Bronco Stadium; Boise, ID (rivalry)		W 37–27	21,669	
September 24	7:05 pm	Liberty*		Bronco Stadium; Boise, ID		W 35–7	21,584	
October 1	7:05 pm	at No. 16 Northern Arizona	No. 25	Walkup Skydome; Flagstaff, AZ		W 28–16	12,865	
October 8	7:05 pm	Weber State^{†}	No. 16	Bronco Stadium; Boise, ID		W 24–17	23,226	
October 15	6:35 pm	at Idaho State	No. 11	Holt Arena; Pocatello, ID		L 31–32	10,267	
October 22	12:05 pm	at Montana State	No. 17	Reno H. Sales Stadium; Bozeman, MT		W 38–10	7,407	
November 5	1:05 pm	No. 1 Montana	No. 15	Bronco Stadium; Boise, ID		W 38–14	22,630	
November 12	1:05 pm	at Eastern Washington	No. 10	Woodward Field; Cheney, WA		W 16–13	3,872	
November 19	1:05 pm	No. 3 Idaho	No. 6	Bronco Stadium; Boise, ID (rivalry)		W 27–24	23,701	
November 26		No. 18 North Texas*	No. 3	Bronco Stadium; Boise, ID (NCAA Division I-AA First Round)		W 24–20	14,706	
December 3	1:05 pm	No. 17 Appalachian State*	No. 3	Bronco Stadium; Boise, ID (NCAA Division I-AA Quarterfinal)		W 17–14	15,302	
December 10	1:30 pm	No. 2 Marshall*	No. 3	Bronco Stadium; Boise, ID (NCAA Division I-AA Semifinal)		W 28–24	20,068	
December 17	10:30 am	vs. No. 1 Youngstown State*	No. 3	Marshall University Stadium; Huntington, WV (NCAA Division I-AA Championship Game)	CBS	L 14–28	27,674	
*Non-conference game; ^{†}Homecoming; Rankings from The Sports Network Poll released prior to the game; All times are in Mountain time

== Regular season ==
Coming off a 3–8 year in 1993, Boise State finished the 1994 regular season at 10–1 and 6–1 in conference to win their sixth Big Sky title, their first since the national championship season of 1980. The only blemish was a one-point loss at Idaho State in mid-October. A convincing 38–14 win over top-ranked Montana in early November put the Broncos into the top ten. To complete the regular season, #6 BSU hosted third-ranked rival Idaho, and won for the first time since 1981, breaking a twelve-game winning streak for the Vandals. Both teams entered the game at 9–1 (and 5–1 in conference); they switched rankings for the next poll.

Unranked at the start of the season, Boise State finished third in the final poll, released prior to the playoffs.

== I-AA playoffs ==
Three Big Sky teams made the 16-team field for the I-AA playoffs: Boise State (10–1), Idaho (9–2), and Montana (9–2). Idaho lost a first round road game, and Montana won two home games before falling on the road to defending champion Youngstown State in the semifinals, foiling an all-Big Sky final. Conference MVP quarterback Dave Dickenson did not play due to an ankle injury, and the Griz lost 28–9. The Penguins had defeated Idaho on the same field in the semifinals the previous season. The Broncos hosted and won three close games, against North Texas, Appalachian State, and #2 Marshall to raise their overall record to 13–1.

Prior to hosting their third straight playoff game at home (following the home game against Idaho), Allen promised to ride his horse down Boise's Broadway Avenue if the Marshall game had an attendance over 20,000. Allen fulfilled his promise two days after the game and rode westbound on University Drive, from Bronco Stadium at Broadway to the Student Union.

In the I-AA finals five days later at Huntington, West Virginia, they were defeated by the defending champions, Jim Tressel's top-ranked Youngstown State, 28–14. The 15 games are the most Boise State ever played in one season, and finished at 13–2.

The 1994 season is known by BSU fans as The Magic Carpet Ride, as the Broncos won all ten home games on the blue AstroTurf of Bronco Stadium. This was Boise State's last Big Sky title in football and final appearance in the I-AA playoffs; BSU moved up to Division I-A and the Big West Conference in 1996.

== Allen's cancer ==
Bothered by shoulder pain for about a month, Allen had outpatient surgery in Boise for a biopsy three days prior to the 1994 championship game, and was diagnosed two days after the game with rhabdomyosarcoma, a rare form of muscle cancer.

The tumor in his upper right arm was removed in March and Allen underwent extensive chemotherapy and a stem-cell transplant in July at the Fred Hutchinson Center in Seattle. He returned to coach the Broncos in 1995 while going through treatment, and the cancer was declared in remission in December 1995, but the doctors warned of likely recurrence.
