= Charlie Sadler =

American football player and coach (born 1949)

Biographical details
- Born: May 6, 1949 (age 77)

Playing career
- c. 1970: Northeastern State

Coaching career (HC unless noted)
- 1972–1975: R. L. Turner HS (TX) (assistant)
- 1976–1977: Lamar Consolidated HS (TX) (DC)
- 1978: Oklahoma (OL)
- 1979–1982: Iowa State (DL)
- 1983: Missouri (LB)
- 1984–1988: Oklahoma (DL)
- 1989–1990: Oklahoma (DC)
- 1991–1995: Northern Illinois
- 2000: Akins HS (TX) (DC)
- 2001–2002: Lake Travis HS (TX)
- 2003–2009: Texas Tech (DE)

Head coaching record
- Overall: 18–37 (college)

Charlie Sadler (born May 6, 1949) is an American former football coach. He served as the head football coach at Northern Illinois University from 1991 to 1995, compiling a record of 18–37. Sadler was the defensive ends coach at Texas Tech University from 2003 to 2009. He previously held coaching positions at the University of Oklahoma, the University of Missouri, and Iowa State University.

== Head coaching record ==
Year	Team	Overall	Conference	Standing
Northern Illinois Huskies (NCAA Division I-A independent) (1991–1992)
1991	Northern Illinois	2–9		
1992	Northern Illinois	5–6		
Northern Illinois Huskies (Big West Conference) (1993–1995)
1993	Northern Illinois	4–7	3–3	5th
1994	Northern Illinois	4–7	3–3	T–5th
1995	Northern Illinois	3–8	3–3	T–4th
Northern Illinois:		18–37	9–9	
Total:		18–37		
