= 1994 Weber State Wildcats football team =

American college football season

1994 Weber State Wildcats football
- Conference: Big Sky Conference
- Record: 5–6 (2–5 Big Sky)
- Head coach: Dave Arslanian (6th season)
- Home stadium: Wildcat Stadium

1994 Big Sky Conference football standings
	Conf.					Overall
Team	W		L		T	W		L		T
No. 3 Boise State $^	6	–	1	–	0	13	–	2	–	0
No. 6 Idaho ^	5	–	2	–	0	9	–	3	–	0
No. 8 Montana ^	5	–	2	–	0	11	–	3	–	0
No. 25 Northern Arizona	4	–	3	–	0	7	–	4	–	0
Idaho State	4	–	3	–	0	6	–	5	–	0
Weber State	2	–	5	–	0	5	–	6	–	0
Eastern Washington	2	–	5	–	0	4	–	7	–	0
Montana State	0	–	7	–	0	3	–	8	–	0
$ – Conference champion; ^ – NCAA Division I-AA playoff participant; Rankings from The Sports Network poll

The 1994 Weber State Wildcats football team represented Weber State University as a member of the Big Sky Conference during the 1994 NCAA Division I-AA football season. Led by sixth-year head coach Dave Arslanian, the Wildcats compiled an overall record of 5–6, with a mark of 2–5 in conference play, and finished tied for sixth in the Big Sky.

== Schedule ==
Date	Opponent	Site	Result	Attendance	Source
September 3	Western Montana*	Wildcat Stadium; Ogden, UT	W 30–12	12,063	
September 10	Montana Tech*	Wildcat Stadium; Ogden, UT	W 47–7	12,658	
September 17	No. 13 Montana State	Wildcat Stadium; Ogden, UT	W 41–13	14,582	
September 24	at Eastern Washington	Woodward Field; Cheney, WA	L 6–24	4,533	
October 1	at Northeast Louisiana*	Malone Stadium; Monroe, LA	L 37–62	18,147	
October 8	at No. 16 Boise State	Bronco Stadium; Boise, ID	L 17–24	23,226	
October 15	at Southern Utah*	Coliseum of Southern Utah; Cedar City, UT	W 20–14		
October 22	No. 2 Montana	Wildcat Stadium; Ogden, UT	L 20–35	16,547	
October 29	at Northern Arizona	Walkup Skydome; Flagstaff, AZ	L 20–24	9,775	
November 5	Idaho State	Wildcat Stadium; Ogden, UT	W 40–6	8,253	
November 12	at No. 4 Idaho	Kibbie Dome; Moscow, ID	L 30–79	9,300	
*Non-conference game; Rankings from The Sports Network Poll released prior to the game
