= 1994 Montana State Bobcats football team =

American college football season

1994 Montana State Bobcats football
- Conference: Big Sky Conference
- Record: 3–8 (0–7 Big Sky)
- Head coach: Cliff Hysell (3rd season)
- Home stadium: Sales Stadium

1994 Big Sky Conference football standings
	Conf.					Overall
Team	W		L		T	W		L		T
No. 3 Boise State $^	6	–	1	–	0	13	–	2	–	0
No. 6 Idaho ^	5	–	2	–	0	9	–	3	–	0
No. 8 Montana ^	5	–	2	–	0	11	–	3	–	0
No. 25 Northern Arizona	4	–	3	–	0	7	–	4	–	0
Idaho State	4	–	3	–	0	6	–	5	–	0
Weber State	2	–	5	–	0	5	–	6	–	0
Eastern Washington	2	–	5	–	0	4	–	7	–	0
Montana State	0	–	7	–	0	3	–	8	–	0
$ – Conference champion; ^ – NCAA Division I-AA playoff participant; Rankings from The Sports Network poll

The 1994 Montana State Bobcats football team was an American football team that represented Montana State University in the Big Sky Conference (Big Sky) during the 1994 NCAA Division I-AA football season. In their third season under head coach Cliff Hysell, the Bobcats compiled a 3–8 record (0–7 against Big Sky opponents) and finished last in the Big Sky.

== Schedule ==
Date	Opponent	Rank	Site	Result	Attendance	Source
September 3	Minnesota–Duluth*	No. 25	Sales Stadium; Bozeman, MT	W 37–7	9,657	
September 10	at No. 11 Stephen F. Austin*	No. 24	Homer Bryce Stadium; Nacogdoches, TX	W 21–18		
September 17	at Weber State	No. 13	Wildcat Stadium; Ogden, UT	L 13–41	14,582	
September 24	No. 23 Northern Arizona	No. 21	Sales Stadium; Bozeman, MT	L 30–47	11,407	
October 1	at Sacramento State*		Hornet Stadium; Sacramento, CA	L 14–30	3,847	
October 8	Idaho State^{†}		Sales Stadium; Bozeman, MT	L 20–38	12,207	
October 15	at No. 4 Idaho		Kibbie Dome; Moscow, ID	L 13–27	9,076	
October 22	No. 17 Boise State		Sales Stadium; Bozeman, MT	L 10–38	7,407	
October 29	at Eastern Washington		Woodward Field; Cheney, WA	L 31–34	4,105	
November 5	Western New Mexico*		Sales Stadium; Bozeman, MT	W 44–6	3,407	
November 19	at Montana		Washington–Grizzly Stadium; Missoula, MT (rivalry)	L 20–55	15,640	
*Non-conference game; ^{†}Homecoming; Rankings from The Sports Network Poll released prior to the game
