= 1994 Idaho State Bengals football team =

American college football season

1994 Idaho State Bengals football
- Conference: Big Sky Conference
- Record: 6–5 (4–3 Big Sky)
- Head coach: Brian McNeely (3rd season)
- Home stadium: Holt Arena

1994 Big Sky Conference football standings
	Conf.					Overall
Team	W		L		T	W		L		T
No. 3 Boise State $^	6	–	1	–	0	13	–	2	–	0
No. 6 Idaho ^	5	–	2	–	0	9	–	3	–	0
No. 8 Montana ^	5	–	2	–	0	11	–	3	–	0
No. 25 Northern Arizona	4	–	3	–	0	7	–	4	–	0
Idaho State	4	–	3	–	0	6	–	5	–	0
Weber State	2	–	5	–	0	5	–	6	–	0
Eastern Washington	2	–	5	–	0	4	–	7	–	0
Montana State	0	–	7	–	0	3	–	8	–	0
$ – Conference champion; ^ – NCAA Division I-AA playoff participant; Rankings from The Sports Network poll

The 1994 Idaho State Bengals football team represented Idaho State University as a member of the Big Sky Conference during the 1994 NCAA Division I-AA football season. Led by third-year head coach Brian McNeely, the Bengals compiled an overall record of 6–5, with a mark of 4–3 in conference play, and finished tied for fourth in the Big Sky.

== Schedule ==
Date	Opponent	Site	Result	Attendance	Source
September 3	Adams State*	Holt Arena; Pocatello, ID	W 54–0		
September 10	at Utah*	Robert Rice Stadium; Salt Lake City, UT	L 0–66	30,064	
September 17	at Northern Arizona	Walkup Skydome; Flagstaff, AZ	L 19–41	8,457	
October 1	at No. 6 Idaho	Kibbie Dome; Moscow, ID (rivalry)	L 21–70	8,750	
October 8	at Montana State	Reno H. Sales Stadium; Bozeman, MT	W 38–20	12,207	
October 15	No. 11 Boise State	Holt Arena; Pocatello, ID	W 32–31	10,267	
October 22	Eastern Washington	Holt Arena; Pocatello, ID	W 21–16		
October 29	Portland State*	Holt Arena; Pocatello, ID	L 21–38	7,480	
November 5	at Weber State	Wildcat Stadium; Ogden, UT	L 6–40	8,253	
November 12	No. 5 Montana	Holt Arena; Pocatello, ID	W 28–23	5,873	
November 19	Minnesota–Duluth*	Holt Arena; Pocatello, ID	W 29–24	4,932	
*Non-conference game; Rankings from The Sports Network Poll released prior to the game
