= 1994 Las Vegas Bowl =

- 3rd Las Vegas Bowl
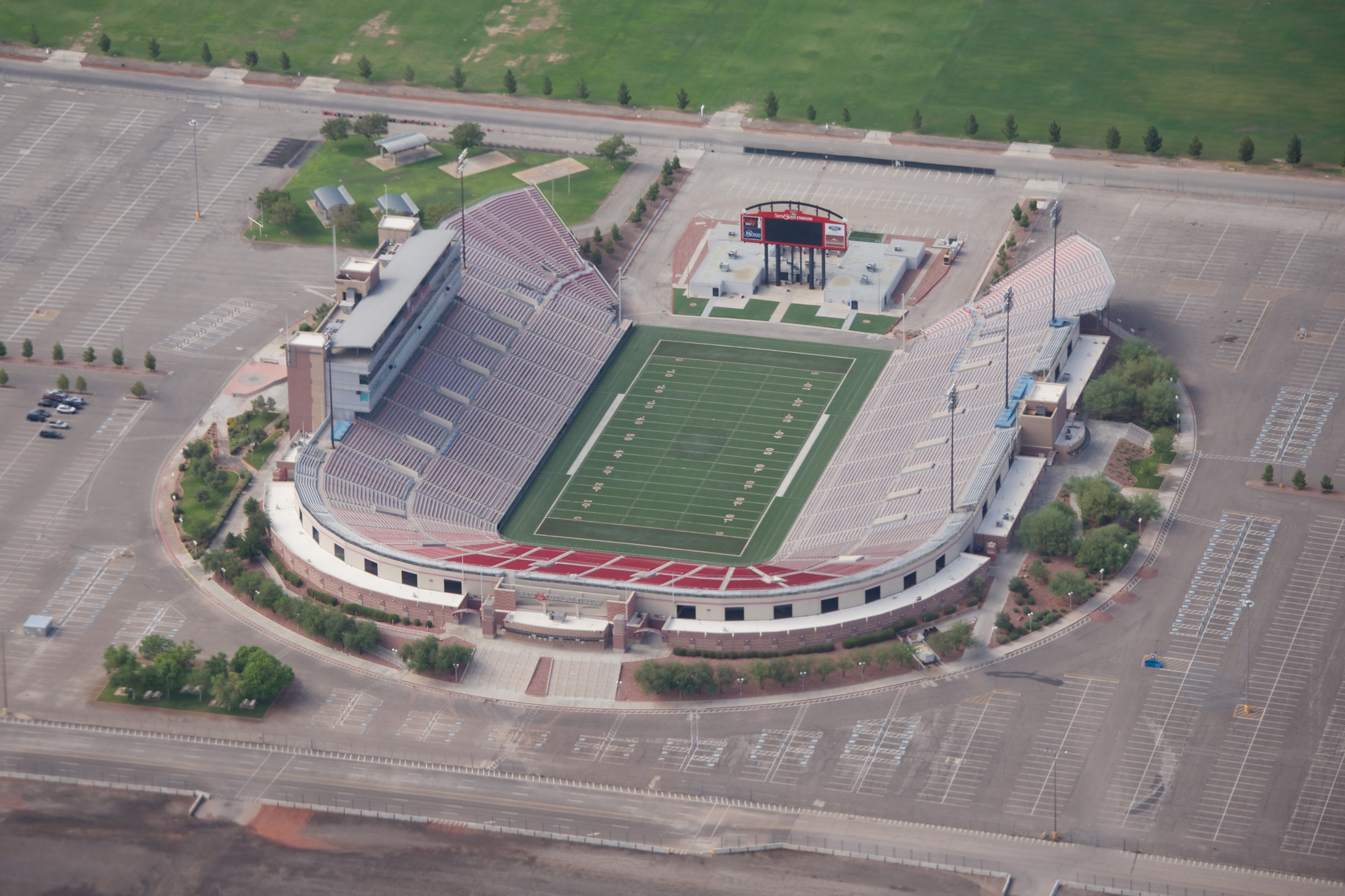
- Sam Boyd Stadium in Whitney, Nevada, hosted the Las Vegas Bowl.
Central Michigan Chippewas	UNLV Rebels
(9–2)	(6–5)
MAC	Big West
24	52
Head coach: Dick Flynn	Head coach: Jeff Horton
	1	2	3	4	Total
Central Michigan	10	0	0	14	24
UNLV	14	17	14	7	52
- Date: December 15, 1994
- Season: 1994
- Stadium: Sam Boyd Stadium
- Location: Whitney, Nevada
- MVP: Henry Bailey
- Attendance: 17,562

The 1994 Las Vegas Bowl featured the UNLV Rebels and the Central Michigan Chippewas in a bowl rematch of a regular season game between the two teams.

== Background ==
Central Michigan was in its first year under Dick Flynn, who lead them to a Mid-American Conference (MAC) championship. UNLV tied for second in the Big West Conference as they were making their second bowl game in ten years under first-year head coach Jeff Horton. This was a rematch of an earlier matchup the two teams had earlier in the season, which Central Michigan won, 35–23 at home.

== Game summary ==
Henry Bailey had four touchdowns on the day for UNLV, three rushing and one passing, with 7 rushes for 79 yards and 5 catches for 101 yards to help win the game for UNLV, who had a 31–10 lead at halftime and led 52–10 after UNLV scored for the last time early in the fourth quarter. Ten touchdowns were scored on the day, seven by UNLV. Central Michigan had more turnovers (4) than touchdowns (3).

== Aftermath ==
Flynn was fired in 1999 after five non-bowl seasons. The Chippewas didn't reach a bowl game again until 2006, the same year they won their next MAC title.

Horton was fired before UNLV would reach another bowl game, which they did under John Robinson, in 2000.

== Statistics ==
Statistics	CMU	UNLV
First downs	22	26
Yards rushing	152	301
Yards passing	224	288
Total yards	376	589
Fumbles-Lost	5-2	3-1
Interceptions	2	0
Penalties-Yards	6-50	8-89
Time of Possession	36:34	23:26

== See also ==
- List of college football post-season games that were rematches of regular season games
