= 1994 Idaho Vandals football team =

American college football season

1994 Idaho Vandals football

NCAA Division I-AA First Round, L 21–38 at NcNeese State
- Conference: Big Sky Conference

Ranking
- Sports Network: No. 6
- Record: 9–3 (5–2 Big Sky)
- Head coach: John L. Smith (6th season)
- Offensive coordinator: Art Valero (1st season)
- Offensive scheme: Spread
- Defensive coordinator: Nick Holt (1st season)
- Base defense: 4–3
- Home stadium: Kibbie Dome

1994 Big Sky Conference football standings
	Conf.					Overall
Team	W		L		T	W		L		T
No. 3 Boise State $^	6	–	1	–	0	13	–	2	–	0
No. 6 Idaho ^	5	–	2	–	0	9	–	3	–	0
No. 8 Montana ^	5	–	2	–	0	11	–	3	–	0
No. 25 Northern Arizona	4	–	3	–	0	7	–	4	–	0
Idaho State	4	–	3	–	0	6	–	5	–	0
Weber State	2	–	5	–	0	5	–	6	–	0
Eastern Washington	2	–	5	–	0	4	–	7	–	0
Montana State	0	–	7	–	0	3	–	8	–	0
$ – Conference champion; ^ – NCAA Division I-AA playoff participant; Rankings from The Sports Network poll

The 1994 Idaho Vandals football team represented the University of Idaho in the 1994 NCAA Division I-AA football season. The Vandals, led by sixth-year head coach John L. Smith, were members of the Big Sky Conference and played their home games at the Kibbie Dome, an indoor facility on campus in Moscow, Idaho.

Led by quarterbacks Eric Hisaw and Brian Brennan, Idaho finished the regular season at 9–2 and 5–2 in the Big Sky, and the Vandals again made the Division I-AA playoffs.

== Notable games ==
After advancing to the semifinals in 1993, Idaho was ranked tenth in the preseason I-AA poll, won their first seven games, and climbed to third in late October. They traveled to Missoula and top-ranked Montana won the Little Brown Stein for the fourth consecutive year. The Grizzlies then lost two in a row to fall to third in the Big Sky standings.

In the regular season finale for the conference title, the Vandals lost to rival Boise State for first time since 1981, as the Broncos won 27–24 in Boise.

== Division I-AA playoffs ==
For the ninth time in ten seasons, the Vandals made the 16-team I-AA playoffs and were ranked sixth in the regular season's final poll.

With Boise State and Montana hosting, Idaho was sent on the road in the first round, and they lost 21–38 at fifth-ranked McNeese State in Lake Charles, Louisiana. Montana advanced to the semifinals but fell to Youngstown State, who defeated Boise State in the championship game.

== Notable players and coaches ==
Sophomore defensive end Ryan Phillips was a four-year starter; he moved to outside linebacker as a senior in 1996, and was selected in the third round of the 1997 NFL draft by the New York Giants. He played five seasons in the NFL, including Super Bowl XXXV in January 2001.

Two future Vandal head coaches were on the staff: Nick Holt (defensive coordinator/defensive line) and Paul Petrino (receivers).

This was Smith's final year as head coach at Idaho and his 53 wins leads the Vandals' all-time list; Dennis Erickson is next, with 36 in five seasons.

== Schedule ==
Date	Time	Opponent	Rank	Site	TV	Result	Attendance	Source
September 3	6:00 pm	at Southern Utah*	No. 10	Coliseum of Southern Utah; Cedar City, UT		W 43–10		
September 17	7:00 pm	at UNLV*	No. 6	Sam Boyd Stadium; Whitney, NV		W 48–38	8,820	
September 24	1:05 pm	No. 15 Stephen F. Austin*	No. 7	Kibbie Dome; Moscow, ID		W 58–26	10,200	
October 1	1:07 pm	Idaho State	No. 6	Kibbie Dome; Moscow, ID (rivalry)		W 70–21	8,750	
October 8	11:07 am	at Eastern Washington	No. 4	Woodward Field; Cheney, WA	PSN	W 40–15	5,873	
October 15	1:07 pm	Montana State	No. 4	Kibbie Dome; Moscow, ID		W 27–13	9,076	
October 22	1:07 pm	Northern Arizona^{†}	No. 4	Kibbie Dome; Moscow, ID		W 41–14	14,252	
October 29	11:07 am	at No. 1 Montana	No. 3	Washington–Grizzly Stadium; Missoula, MT (Little Brown Stein)		L 21–45	15,466	
November 5	1:05 pm	Northern Iowa*	No. 6	Kibbie Dome; Moscow, ID		W 21–12	10,200	
November 12	1:05 pm	Weber State	No. 4	Kibbie Dome; Moscow, Idaho		W 79–30	9,300	
November 19	12:05 pm	at No. 6 Boise State	No. 3	Bronco Stadium; Boise, ID (rivalry)	KUID	L 24–27	23,701	
November 26	5:00 pm	at No. 5 McNeese State*	No. 6	Cowboy Stadium; Lake Charles, LA (NCAA Division I-AA First Round)		L 20–23	16,000	
*Non-conference game; ^{†}Homecoming; Rankings from The Sports Network Poll released prior to the game; All times are in Pacific time
