= Jeff Horton =

American football coach and former player

Biographical details
- Born: July 13, 1957 (age 69); Arlington, Texas, U.S.
- Education: University of Nevada, Reno (B.A.); University of San Francisco (M.A.)

Coaching career (HC unless noted)
- 1984: Minnesota (GA)
- 1985–1989: Nevada (WR/RB/ST)
- 1990–1991: UNLV (AHC)
- 1992: Nevada (WR)
- 1993: Nevada
- 1994–1998: UNLV
- 1999–2005: Wisconsin (QB)
- 2006: St. Louis Rams (OL)
- 2007–2008: St. Louis Rams (assistant)
- 2009: Detroit Lions (QB)
- 2010: Minnesota (OC/QB)
- 2010: Minnesota (interim HC)
- 2011–2014: San Diego State (AHC/RB)
- 2015–2019: San Diego State (AHC/OC/RB)
- 2020–2022: San Diego State (RB)

Head coaching record
- Overall: 22–51
- Bowls: 1–0

Accomplishments and honors

Championships
- 1 Big West (1994)

Awards
- Big West Coach of the Year (1994)

Jeffrey Scott Horton (born July 13, 1957) is a retired American football coach. His final position was the associate head coach at San Diego State University. Prior to that he was the interim head coach at the University of Minnesota, having replaced Tim Brewster, who was fired midway through the Golden Gophers' 2010 season. Horton previously served as the head coach at the University of Nevada, Reno in 1993 and at the University of Nevada, Las Vegas from 1994 to 1998. From 2006 to 2008, he was a special assistant/offense and assistant offensive line coach for the St. Louis Rams of the National Football League (NFL), where he worked under head coach Scott Linehan. Horton coached the quarterbacks for the NFL's Detroit Lions in 2009.

== Coaching career ==
=== Early coaching career ===
Horton's first coaching job was as a graduate assistant for Minnesota in 1984 under Lou Holtz. The following year, he joined his alma mater as assistant in Reno. In 1990 and 1991, he was the wide receivers coach. In 1992, he left to become the Wide Receivers coach at UNLV.

=== Head coach at Nevada ===
After the 1992 football season ended, Wolf Pack head coach Chris Ault stepped down to focus on his duties as the university's athletic director. Horton was Ault's hand-picked successor, and he returned from Las Vegas to take over as head coach of the Wolf Pack. Horton lead Nevada to a 7–4 record and a second-place finish in the Big West Conference. On November 22, 1993, Horton accepted the position of head coach at UNLV.

=== Head coach at UNLV ===
Following the 1993 season, Horton accepted the head coaching position at in-state rival UNLV, a move commonly referred to as the "Red Defection" by Wolf Pack fans. In his first season in 1994, the Rebels won a share of the Big West title (officially the first and only conference championship in program history) and the 1994 Las Vegas Bowl, winning Horton that conference's Coach of the Year award.

However, this would not last, and Horton would win only six more games over the next three years. He was fired after the Rebels finished 0–11 in the 1998 season, the only winless season in school history until the 2020 UNLV team finished 0–6 under head coach Marcus Arroyo.

=== Wisconsin ===
After being fired, he was hired as the quarterbacks coach for the Wisconsin Badgers. The quarterbacks during his tenure (Jim Sorgi, Brooks Bollinger, and John Stocco), rank first, second, and fourth in Badgers history in passing yards.

=== St. Louis Rams ===
Horton was hired as the special assistant/offense to the St. Louis Rams. In that position, he assisted head coach Scott Linehan with administrative duties, offensive play-calling, and preparation.

=== Detroit Lions ===
Horton spent one season (2009) with the Detroit Lions as the quarterbacks coach.

=== Minnesota ===
Horton was hired by Minnesota coach Tim Brewster in January 2010, after Jedd Fisch left to be the quarterbacks coach for the NFL Seattle Seahawks. On October 17, 2010, Brewster was relieved of his head coaching duties. Horton was tapped to replace Brewster on an interim basis. He went 2–3 as coach, beating the Iowa Hawkeyes on November 27 to win the Floyd of Rosedale trophy. It was the first trophy-game win for the Gophers since 2006. Jerry Kill was hired as Minnesota's next coach and Horton was not retained on the staff.

=== San Diego State ===
Horton spent 12 years at San Diego State before retiring. His roles included running backs coach, offensive coordinator, and associate head coach. In 2016, San Diego State made NCAA history as it became the first program to ever produce a 2,000-yard rusher and 1,000-yard rusher in the same season. Once dubbed a "running back whisperer" in the press, the Aztecs were bowl eligible in all twelve seasons under Horton at San Diego State and won three Mountain West titles.

== Head coaching record ==
Year	Team	Overall	Conference	Standing	Bowl/playoffs
Nevada Wolf Pack (Big West Conference) (1993)
1993	Nevada	7–4	5–2	3rd	
Nevada:		7–4	5–2		
UNLV Rebels (Big West Conference) (1994–1995)
1994	UNLV	7–5	5–1	T–1st	W Las Vegas
1995	UNLV	2–9	1–5	10th	
UNLV Rebels (Western Athletic Conference) (1996–1998)
1996	UNLV	1–11	1–7	T–7th (Pacific)	
1997	UNLV	3–8	2–6	7th (Pacific)	
1998	UNLV	0–11	0–8	8th (Mountain)	
UNLV:		13–44	9–29		
Minnesota Golden Gophers (Big Ten Conference) (2010)
2010	Minnesota	2–3 (Note: Horton served as interim head coach after Tim Brewster was fired.)	2–3	T–9th	
Minnesota:		2–3	2–3		
Total:		22–51			
