= 1994 Montana Grizzlies football team =

American college football season

1994 Montana Grizzlies football

NCAA Division I-AA Semifinal, L 9–28 vs. Youngstown State
- Conference: Big Sky Conference

Ranking
- Sports Network: No. 8
- Record: 11–3 (5–2 Big Sky)
- Head coach: Don Read (9th season)
- Offensive coordinator: Mick Dennehy (4th season)
- Defensive coordinator: Jerome Souers (5th season)
- Home stadium: Washington–Grizzly Stadium

1994 Big Sky Conference football standings
	Conf.					Overall
Team	W		L		T	W		L		T
No. 3 Boise State $^	6	–	1	–	0	13	–	2	–	0
No. 6 Idaho ^	5	–	2	–	0	9	–	3	–	0
No. 8 Montana ^	5	–	2	–	0	11	–	3	–	0
No. 25 Northern Arizona	4	–	3	–	0	7	–	4	–	0
Idaho State	4	–	3	–	0	6	–	5	–	0
Weber State	2	–	5	–	0	5	–	6	–	0
Eastern Washington	2	–	5	–	0	4	–	7	–	0
Montana State	0	–	7	–	0	3	–	8	–	0
$ – Conference champion; ^ – NCAA Division I-AA playoff participant; Rankings from The Sports Network poll

The 1994 Montana Grizzlies football team was an American football team that represented the University of Montana in the Big Sky Conference during the 1994 NCAA Division I-AA football season. In their ninth year under head coach Don Read, the team compiled a 11–3 record.

== Schedule ==
Date	Opponent	Rank	Site	Result	Attendance	Source
September 3	Sonoma State*	No. 5	Washington–Grizzly Stadium; Missoula, MT	W 41–7	11,266	
September 10	No. 10 (D-II) Carson–Newman*	No. 4	Washington–Grizzly Stadium; Missoula, MT	W 48–14	11,119	
September 17	Eastern Washington	No. 3	Washington–Grizzly Stadium; Missoula, MT (rivalry)	W 49–29	13,831	
September 24	at North Texas*	No. 3	Fouts Field; Denton, TX	W 21–17	20,354	
October 1	Cal Poly*	No. 3	Washington–Grizzly Stadium; Missoula, MT	W 45–0	11,868	
October 8	No. 23 Northern Arizona	No. 2	Washington–Grizzly Stadium; Missoula, MT	W 35–24	15,466	
October 22	at Weber State	No. 2	Wildcat Stadium; Ogden, UT	W 35–20	16,547	
October 29	No. 3 Idaho	No. 1	Washington–Grizzly Stadium; Missoula, MT	W 45–21	15,466	
November 5	at No. 15 Boise State	No. 1	Bronco Stadium; Boise, ID	L 14–38	22,630	
November 12	at Idaho State	No. 5	Holt Arena; Pocatello, ID	L 23–28	5,873	
November 19	Montana State	No. 11	Washington–Grizzly Stadium; Missoula, MT (rivalry)	W 55–20	15,640	
November 26	No. 11 Northern Iowa*	No. 8	Washington–Grizzly Stadium; Missoula, MT (NCAA Division I-AA First Round)	W 23–20	7,958	
December 3	No. 5 McNeese State*	No. 8	Washington–Grizzly Stadium; Missoula, MT (NCAA Division I-AA Quarterfinal)	W 30–28	8,419	
December 10	at No. 1 Youngstown State*	No. 8	Stambaugh Stadium; Youngstown, OH (NCAA Division I-AA Semifinal)	L 9–28	15,333	
*Non-conference game; Rankings from The Sports Network Poll released prior to the game
