= 1994 Eastern Washington Eagles football team =

American college football season

1994 Eastern Washington Eagles football
- Conference: Big Sky Conference
- Record: 4–7 (2–5 Big Sky)
- Head coach: Mike Kramer (1st season)
- Home stadium: Woodward Field

1994 Big Sky Conference football standings
	Conf.					Overall
Team	W		L		T	W		L		T
No. 3 Boise State $^	6	–	1	–	0	13	–	2	–	0
No. 6 Idaho ^	5	–	2	–	0	9	–	3	–	0
No. 8 Montana ^	5	–	2	–	0	11	–	3	–	0
No. 25 Northern Arizona	4	–	3	–	0	7	–	4	–	0
Idaho State	4	–	3	–	0	6	–	5	–	0
Weber State	2	–	5	–	0	5	–	6	–	0
Eastern Washington	2	–	5	–	0	4	–	7	–	0
Montana State	0	–	7	–	0	3	–	8	–	0
$ – Conference champion; ^ – NCAA Division I-AA playoff participant; Rankings from The Sports Network poll

The 1994 Eastern Washington Eagles football team represented Eastern Washington University as a member of the Big Sky Conference during the 1994 NCAA Division I-AA football season. Led by first-year head coach Mike Kramer, the Eagles compiled an overall record of 4–7, with a mark of 2–5 in conference play, and finished tied for sixth in the Big Sky.

== Schedule ==
Date	Opponent	Site	Result	Attendance	Source
September 10	Cal Poly*	Woodward Field; Cheney, WA	W 61–7		
September 17	at No. 3 Montana	Washington–Grizzly Stadium; Missoula, MT (rivalry)	L 29–49	13,831	
September 24	Weber State	Woodward Field; Cheney, WA	W 24–6	4,533	
October 1	at Portland State*	Civic Stadium; Portland, OR	L 21–31	11,225	
October 8	No. 4 Idaho	Woodward Field; Cheney, WA	L 15–40	5,873	
October 15	at Northern Arizona	Walkup Skydome; Flagstaff, AZ	L 21–34		
October 22	at Idaho State	Holt Arena; Pocatello, ID	L 16–21		
October 29	Montana State	Woodward Field; Cheney, WA	W 34–31	4,105	
November 5	at Utah State*	Romney Stadium; Logan, UT	W 49–31	10,211	
November 12	No. 10 Boise State	Woodward Field; Cheney, WA	L 13–16	3,872	
November 19	at No. 14 Northern Iowa*	UNI-Dome; Cedar Falls, IA	L 17–27	12,353	
*Non-conference game; Rankings from The Sports Network Poll released prior to the game
