= 1993 Louisiana Tech Bulldogs football team =

American college football season

1993 Louisiana Tech Bulldogs football
- Conference: Big West Conference
- Record: 3–8 (2–4 Big West)
- Head coach: Joe Raymond Peace (6th season)
- Defensive coordinator: Art Kaufman (2nd season)
- Captains: Carlos Bolton; Cliff Parks
- Home stadium: Joe Aillet Stadium

1993 Big West Conference football standings
	Conf.					Overall
Team	W		L		T	W		L		T
Southwestern Louisiana +	5	–	1	–	0	8	–	3	–	0
Utah State +	5	–	1	–	0	7	–	5	–	0
Nevada	4	–	2	–	0	7	–	4	–	0
New Mexico State	4	–	2	–	0	5	–	6	–	0
Northern Illinois	3	–	3	–	0	4	–	7	–	0
Pacific (CA)	2	–	4	–	0	3	–	8	–	0
UNLV	2	–	4	–	0	3	–	8	–	0
Louisiana Tech	2	–	4	–	0	2	–	9	–	0
San Jose State	2	–	4	–	0	2	–	9	–	0
Arkansas State	1	–	5	–	0	2	–	8	–	1
+ – Conference co-champions

The 1993 Louisiana Tech Bulldogs football team was an American football team that represented Louisiana Tech University as a member of the Big West Conference during the 1993 NCAA Division I-A football season. In their sixth year under head coach Joe Raymond Peace, the team compiled a 3–8 record.

== Schedule ==
Date	Opponent	Site	Result	Attendance	Source
September 4	at No. 10 Tennessee*	Neyland Stadium; Knoxville, TN	L 0–50	95,106	
September 18	at South Carolina*	Williams–Brice Stadium; Columbia, SC	L 3–34	69,208	
September 25	at No. 2 Alabama*	Legion Field; Birmingham, AL	W 3–56 (Alabama forfeit)	83,091	
October 2	Arkansas State	Joe Aillet Stadium; Ruston, LA	W 17–3	14,000	
October 16	at East Carolina*	Ficklen Memorial Stadium; Greenville, NC	L 28–31	27,103	
October 23	at San Jose State	Spartan Stadium; San Jose, CA	L 6–31	15,145	
October 30	Northern Illinois	Joe Aillet Stadium; Ruston, LA	W 17–16	9,200	
November 6	UNLV	Joe Aillet Stadium; Ruston, LA	L 23–28	17,200	
November 13	at Utah State	Romney Stadium; Logan, UT	L 13–24	15,324	
November 20	UCF*	Joe Aillet Stadium; Ruston, LA	L 16–38	4,000	
November 27	at Southwestern Louisiana	Cajun Field; Lafayette, LA (rivalry)	L 17–21	19,127	
*Non-conference game; Rankings from AP Poll released prior to the game
