= 1994 Utah State Aggies football team =

American college football season

1994 Utah State Aggies football
- Conference: Big West Conference
- Record: 3–8 (2–4 Big West)
- Head coach: Charlie Weatherbie (3rd season)
- Offensive coordinator: Jim Zorn (3rd season)
- Defensive coordinator: Dick Bumpas (3rd season)
- Home stadium: Romney Stadium

1994 Big West Conference football standings
	Conf.					Overall
Team	W		L		T	W		L		T
Nevada +	5	–	1	–	0	9	–	2	–	0
UNLV +	5	–	1	–	0	7	–	5	–	0
Southwestern Louisiana +	5	–	1	–	0	6	–	5	–	0
Pacific (CA)	4	–	2	–	0	6	–	5	–	0
Northern Illinois	3	–	3	–	0	4	–	7	–	0
San Jose State	3	–	3	–	0	3	–	8	–	0
Utah State	2	–	4	–	0	3	–	8	–	0
New Mexico State	2	–	4	–	0	3	–	8	–	0
Louisiana Tech	1	–	5	–	0	3	–	8	–	0
Arkansas State	0	–	6	–	0	1	–	10	–	0
+ – Conference co-champions

The 1994 Utah State Aggies football team represented Utah State University in the 1994 NCAA Division I-A football season. The Aggies were led by head coach Charlie Weatherbie in his third and final year at Utah State. The Aggies played their home games at Romney Stadium in Logan, Utah, their 27th season in the venue. Despite having made a bowl game and sharing the Big West Conference championship the year prior, the Aggies suffered through a difficult year, finishing 3–8 overall and 2–4 in Big West play.

== Schedule ==
Date	Opponent	Site	Result	Attendance	Source
September 3	Utah*	Romney Stadium; Logan, UT (Battle of the Brothers, Beehive Boot)	L 17–32	31,287	
September 10	at Colorado State*	Hughes Stadium; Fort Collins, CO	L 16–41	28,797	
September 17	at Ohio*	Peden Stadium; Athens, OH	W 5–0	5,940	
September 24	UNLV	Romney Stadium; Logan, UT	L 21–23	21,302	
September 30	at BYU*	Cougar Stadium; Provo, UT (Beehive Boot, rivalry)	L 6–34	63,164	
October 15	at Louisiana Tech	Joe Aillet Stadium; Ruston, LA	W 7–3	5,030	
October 22	Southwestern Louisiana	Romney Stadium; Logan, UT	L 25–27	20,016	
October 29	at Pacific (CA)	Stagg Memorial Stadium; Stockton, CA	L 6–28	10,085	
November 5	Eastern Washington*	Romney Stadium; Logan, UT	L 31–49	10,211	
November 12	at Nevada	Mackay Stadium; Reno, NV	L 28–56	21,562	
November 19	New Mexico State	Romney Stadium; Logan, UT	W 47–20	8,819	
*Non-conference game
