= 1993 Pacific Tigers football team =

American college football season

1993 Pacific Tigers football
- Conference: Big West Conference
- Record: 3–8 (2–4 Big West)
- Head coach: Chuck Shelton (2nd season)
- Offensive coordinator: Bill Bleil (2nd season)
- Offensive scheme: Spread
- Co-defensive coordinators: Steve Caldwell (2nd season); Don Dunn (2nd season)
- Base defense: 4–3
- Home stadium: Stagg Memorial Stadium

1993 Big West Conference football standings
	Conf.					Overall
Team	W		L		T	W		L		T
Southwestern Louisiana +	5	–	1	–	0	8	–	3	–	0
Utah State +	5	–	1	–	0	7	–	5	–	0
Nevada	4	–	2	–	0	7	–	4	–	0
New Mexico State	4	–	2	–	0	5	–	6	–	0
Northern Illinois	3	–	3	–	0	4	–	7	–	0
Pacific (CA)	2	–	4	–	0	3	–	8	–	0
UNLV	2	–	4	–	0	3	–	8	–	0
Louisiana Tech	2	–	4	–	0	2	–	9	–	0
San Jose State	2	–	4	–	0	2	–	9	–	0
Arkansas State	1	–	5	–	0	2	–	8	–	1
+ – Conference co-champions

The 1993 Pacific Tigers football team represented the University of the Pacific in the 1993 NCAA Division I-A football season. The Tigers offense scored 184 points while the defense allowed 260 points.

== Schedule ==
Date	Time	Opponent	Site	Result	Attendance	Source
September 4	5:00 p.m.	at Texas Tech*	Jones Stadium; Lubbock, TX	L 7–55	29,164	
September 11	6:00 p.m.	at No. 13 Arizona*	Arizona Stadium; Tucson, AZ	L 13–16	42,292	
September 25		Sacramento State*	Stagg Memorial Stadium; Stockton, CA	W 30–6	12,063	
October 2		Washington State*	Stagg Memorial Stadium; Stockton, CA	L 0–12	14,616	
October 9		at Oregon State*	Parker Stadium; Corvallis, OR	L 7–42	28,349	
October 16	1:00 p.m.	at Northern Illinois	Huskie Stadium; DeKalb, IL	L 16–21	14,475	
October 23		New Mexico State	Stagg Memorial Stadium; Stockton, CA	L 23–27		
October 30		Nevada^{†}	Stagg Memorial Stadium; Stockton, CA	L 23–31		
November 6		at Utah State	Romney Stadium; Logan, UT	L 21–24	14,811	
November 13		Arkansas State	Stagg Memorial Stadium; Stockton, CA	W 20–6		
November 20		at San Jose State	Spartan Stadium; San Jose, CA (Victory Bell)	W 24–20		
*Non-conference game; ^{†}Homecoming; Rankings from AP Poll released prior to the game; All times are in Pacific time
