= 1994 New Mexico State Aggies football team =

American college football season

1994 New Mexico State Aggies football
- Conference: Big West Conference
- Record: 3–8 (2–4 Big West)
- Head coach: Jim Hess (5th season)
- Home stadium: Aggie Memorial Stadium

1994 Big West Conference football standings
	Conf.					Overall
Team	W		L		T	W		L		T
Nevada +	5	–	1	–	0	9	–	2	–	0
UNLV +	5	–	1	–	0	7	–	5	–	0
Southwestern Louisiana +	5	–	1	–	0	6	–	5	–	0
Pacific (CA)	4	–	2	–	0	6	–	5	–	0
Northern Illinois	3	–	3	–	0	4	–	7	–	0
San Jose State	3	–	3	–	0	3	–	8	–	0
Utah State	2	–	4	–	0	3	–	8	–	0
New Mexico State	2	–	4	–	0	3	–	8	–	0
Louisiana Tech	1	–	5	–	0	3	–	8	–	0
Arkansas State	0	–	6	–	0	1	–	10	–	0
+ – Conference co-champions

The 1994 New Mexico State Aggies football team was an American football team that represented New Mexico State University in the Big West Conference during the 1994 NCAA Division I-A football season. In their fifth year under head coach Jim Hess, the Aggies compiled a 3–8 record. The team played its home games at Aggie Memorial Stadium in Las Cruces, New Mexico.

== Schedule ==
Date	Opponent	Site	Result	Attendance	Source
September 3	at No. 1 Florida*	Ben Hill Griffin Stadium; Gainesville, FL	L 21–70	84,721	
September 10	at No. 9 Arizona*	Arizona Stadium; Tucson, AZ	L 0–44	52,889	
September 17	at UTEP*	Sun Bowl; El Paso, TX (rivalry)	W 23–22	40,260	
September 24	Arkansas State	Aggie Memorial Stadium; Las Cruces, NM	W 24–17		
October 1	UNLV	Aggie Memorial Stadium; Las Cruces, NM	L 27–31	22,814	
October 8	at Northern Illinois	Huskie Stadium; DeKalb, IL	L 27–48		
October 15	at Nevada	Mackay Stadium; Reno, NV	L 24–45	22,142	
October 22	New Mexico*	Aggie Memorial Stadium; Las Cruces, NM (rivalry)	L 31–56		
November 5	at San Jose State	Spartan Stadium; San Jose, CA	W 24–21		
November 12	Pacific (CA)	Aggie Memorial Stadium; Las Cruces, NM	L 14–21		
November 19	at Utah State*	Romney Stadium; Logan, UT	L 20–47	8,819	
*Non-conference game; Rankings from AP Poll released prior to the game
