= 1993 Utah State Aggies football team =

American college football season

1993 Utah State Aggies football

Big West co-champion Las Vegas Bowl champion

Las Vegas Bowl, W 42–33 vs. Ball State
- Conference: Big West Conference
- Record: 7–5 (5–1 Big West)
- Head coach: Charlie Weatherbie (2nd season)
- Offensive coordinator: Jim Zorn (2nd season)
- Defensive coordinator: Dick Bumpas (2nd season)
- Home stadium: Romney Stadium

1993 Big West Conference football standings
	Conf.					Overall
Team	W		L		T	W		L		T
Southwestern Louisiana +	5	–	1	–	0	8	–	3	–	0
Utah State +	5	–	1	–	0	7	–	5	–	0
Nevada	4	–	2	–	0	7	–	4	–	0
New Mexico State	4	–	2	–	0	5	–	6	–	0
Northern Illinois	3	–	3	–	0	4	–	7	–	0
Pacific (CA)	2	–	4	–	0	3	–	8	–	0
UNLV	2	–	4	–	0	3	–	8	–	0
Louisiana Tech	2	–	4	–	0	2	–	9	–	0
San Jose State	2	–	4	–	0	2	–	9	–	0
Arkansas State	1	–	5	–	0	2	–	8	–	1
+ – Conference co-champions

The 1993 Utah State Aggies football team represented Utah State University in the 1993 NCAA Division I-A football season. The Aggies were led by second-year head coach Charlie Weatherbie and played their home games at Romney Stadium in Logan, Utah. After a 1–5 start to the season, the team rebounded to finish the regular season 6–5 and earn a spot in the Las Vegas Bowl against Ball State, where they achieved their first bowl win in school history. The team's roster included redshirt freshman quarterback Matt Wells, who was later hired as an assistant coach at the school in 2011 before being promoted to head coach for the 2013 season.

== Schedule ==
Date	Opponent	Site	Result	Attendance	Source
September 4	at Southwestern Louisiana	Cajun Field; Lafayette, LA	W 34–13	21,637	
September 11	at Utah*	Robert Rice Stadium; Salt Lake City, UT (Battle of the Brothers, Beehive Boot)	L 29–31	30,797	
September 18	Baylor*	Romney Stadium; Logan, UT	L 24–28	23,095	
September 25	at Fresno State*	Bulldog Stadium; Fresno, CA	L 14–30	41,031	
October 2	at LSU*	Tiger Stadium; Baton Rouge, LA	L 17–38	57,316	
October 16	Nevada	Romney Stadium; Logan, UT	L 44–48	20,623	
October 23	at UNLV	Sam Boyd Silver Bowl; Whitney, NV	W 33–26	8,010	
October 30	BYU*	Romney Stadium; Logan, UT (rivalry, Beehive Boot)	W 58–56	26,328	
November 6	Pacific (CA)	Romney Stadium; Logan, UT	W 24–21	14,811	
November 13	Louisiana Tech	Romney Stadium; Logan, UT	W 24–13	15,324	
November 20	at New Mexico State	Aggie Memorial Stadium; Las Cruces, NM	W 20–17	17,622	
December 17	vs. Ball State*	Sam Boyd Silver Bowl; Whitney, NV (Las Vegas Bowl)	W 42–33	15,508	
*Non-conference game; Source:
