= 1994 UNLV Rebels football team =

American college football season

1994 UNLV Rebels football

Big West co-champion

Las Vegas Bowl, W 52–24 vs. Central Michigan
- Conference: Big West Conference
- Record: 7–5 (5–1 Big West)
- Head coach: Jeff Horton (1st season)
- Offensive coordinator: Steve Hagen (1st season)
- Defensive coordinator: Steve Eggen (1st season)
- Home stadium: Sam Boyd Stadium

1994 Big West Conference football standings
	Conf.					Overall
Team	W		L		T	W		L		T
Nevada +	5	–	1	–	0	9	–	2	–	0
UNLV +	5	–	1	–	0	7	–	5	–	0
Southwestern Louisiana +	5	–	1	–	0	6	–	5	–	0
Pacific (CA)	4	–	2	–	0	6	–	5	–	0
Northern Illinois	3	–	3	–	0	4	–	7	–	0
San Jose State	3	–	3	–	0	3	–	8	–	0
Utah State	2	–	4	–	0	3	–	8	–	0
New Mexico State	2	–	4	–	0	3	–	8	–	0
Louisiana Tech	1	–	5	–	0	3	–	8	–	0
Arkansas State	0	–	6	–	0	1	–	10	–	0
+ – Conference co-champions

The 1994 UNLV Rebels football team was an American football team that represented the University of Nevada, Las Vegas (UNLV) as a member of the Big West Conference during the 1994 NCAA Division I-A football season. In their first year under head coach Jeff Horton, the Rebels compiled an overall record of 7–5 with a mark of 5–1 in conference play, sharing the Big West title with Nevada and Southwestern Louisiana. UNLV earned a berth in the Las Vegas Bowl, where the Rebels defeated Central Michigan. The team played home games at Sam Boyd Stadium in Whitney, Nevada.

== Schedule ==
Date	Opponent	Site	Result	Attendance	Source
September 3	Eastern Michigan*	Sam Boyd Stadium; Whitney, NV	W 17–3	10,756	
September 10	at Central Michigan*	Kelly/Shorts Stadium; Mount Pleasant, MI	L 23–35	20,316	
September 17	Idaho*	Sam Boyd Stadium; Whitney, NV	L 38–48	8,820	
September 24	at Utah State	Romney Stadium; Logan, UT	W 23–21	21,302	
October 1	at New Mexico State	Aggie Memorial Stadium; Las Cruces, NM	W 31–27	22,814	
October 8	Louisiana Tech	Sam Boyd Stadium; Whitney, NV	W 24–20	10,358	
October 15	at Tulsa*	Skelly Stadium; Tulsa, OK	L 22–44	16,875	
October 29	San Jose State	Sam Boyd Stadium; Whitney, NV	W 23–10	7,729	
November 5	at Southwestern Louisiana	Cajun Field; Lafayette, LA	L 27–28	17,013	
November 19	Nevada*	Sam Boyd Stadium; Whitney, NV (Fremont Cannon)	W 32–27	20,224	
November 26	No. 11 Kansas State*	Sam Boyd Stadium; Whitney, NV	L 3–42	10,331	
December 15	vs. Central Michigan*	Sam Boyd Stadium; Whitney, NV (Las Vegas Bowl)	W 54–24	17,562	
*Non-conference game; Rankings from Coaches' Poll released prior to the game
