= 1994 Arkansas State Indians football team =

American college football season

1994 Arkansas State Indians football
- Conference: Big West Conference
- Record: 1–10 (0–6 Big West)
- Head coach: John Bobo (2nd season)
- Offensive coordinator: Mike Hand (1st season)
- Defensive coordinator: Pete McGinnis (3rd season)
- Home stadium: Indian Stadium

1994 Big West Conference football standings
	Conf.					Overall
Team	W		L		T	W		L		T
Nevada +	5	–	1	–	0	9	–	2	–	0
UNLV +	5	–	1	–	0	7	–	5	–	0
Southwestern Louisiana +	5	–	1	–	0	6	–	5	–	0
Pacific (CA)	4	–	2	–	0	6	–	5	–	0
Northern Illinois	3	–	3	–	0	4	–	7	–	0
San Jose State	3	–	3	–	0	3	–	8	–	0
Utah State	2	–	4	–	0	3	–	8	–	0
New Mexico State	2	–	4	–	0	3	–	8	–	0
Louisiana Tech	1	–	5	–	0	3	–	8	–	0
Arkansas State	0	–	6	–	0	1	–	10	–	0
+ – Conference co-champions

The 1994 Arkansas State Indians football team represented Arkansas State University as a member of the Big West Conference during the 1994 NCAA Division I-A football season. Led by second-year head coach John Bobo, the Indians compiled an overall record of 1–10 with a mark of 0–6 in conference play, placing last out of ten teams in the Big West.

== Schedule ==
Date	Opponent	Site	Result	Attendance	Source
September 3	at No. 21 Virginia Tech*	Lane Stadium; Blacksburg, VA	L 7–34	38,626	
September 10	at Nevada	Mackay Stadium; Reno, NV	L 0–18	19,337	
September 17	Southern Illinois*	Indian Stadium; Jonesboro, AR	W 41–14	13,587	
September 24	at New Mexico State	Aggie Memorial Stadium; Las Cruces, NM	L 17–24		
October 1	at Mississippi State*	Davis Wade Stadium; Starkville, MS	L 3–49	30,143	
October 8	at Southwestern Louisiana	Cajun Field; Lafayette, LA	L 0–26		
October 15	at Memphis*	Liberty Bowl Memorial Stadium; Memphis, TN (Paint Bucket Bowl)	L 6–15	19,857	
October 22	Pacific (CA)^{†}	Indian Stadium; Jonesboro, AR	L 16–30		
November 5	Northern Illinois	Indian Stadium; Jonesboro, AR	L 16–38		
November 12	at No. 10 Colorado State*	Hughes Stadium; Fort Collins, CO	L 3–48	23,741	
November 19	Louisiana Tech	Indian Stadium; Jonesboro, AR	L 14–20	5,736	
*Non-conference game; ^{†}Homecoming; Rankings from AP Poll released prior to the game
