= 1993 Northern Illinois Huskies football team =

American college football season

1993 Northern Illinois Huskies football
- Conference: Big West Conference
- Record: 4–7 (3–3 Big West)
- Head coach: Charlie Sadler (3rd season)
- Captains: LeShon Johnson; Tim O'Brien; Raymond Roberts; Tony Smith
- Home stadium: Huskie Stadium

1993 Big West Conference football standings
	Conf.					Overall
Team	W		L		T	W		L		T
Southwestern Louisiana +	5	–	1	–	0	8	–	3	–	0
Utah State +	5	–	1	–	0	7	–	5	–	0
Nevada	4	–	2	–	0	7	–	4	–	0
New Mexico State	4	–	2	–	0	5	–	6	–	0
Northern Illinois	3	–	3	–	0	4	–	7	–	0
Pacific (CA)	2	–	4	–	0	3	–	8	–	0
UNLV	2	–	4	–	0	3	–	8	–	0
Louisiana Tech	2	–	4	–	0	2	–	9	–	0
San Jose State	2	–	4	–	0	2	–	9	–	0
Arkansas State	1	–	5	–	0	2	–	8	–	1
+ – Conference co-champions

The 1993 Northern Illinois Huskies football team represented Northern Illinois University as a member of the Big West Conference during the 1993 NCAA Division I-A football season. Led by third-year head coach Charlie Sadler, the Huskies compiled an overall record of 4–7 with a mark of 3–3 in conference play, placing fifth in the Big West. Northern Illinois played home games at Huskie Stadium in DeKalb, Illinois.

== Schedule ==
Date	Time	Opponent	Site	Result	Attendance	Source
September 2	7:00 p.m.	at Iowa State*	Cyclone Stadium; Ames, IA	L 10–54	35,706	
September 11	1:00 p.m.	at Indiana*	Memorial Stadium; Bloomington, IN	L 10–28	30,920	
September 18	6:30 p.m.	Arkansas State	Huskie Stadium; DeKalb, IL	W 23–7	13,902	
September 25	3:00 p.m.	at Nevada	Mackay Stadium; Reno, NV	W 46–42	22,023	
October 2	6:30 p.m.	Southern Illinois*	Huskie Stadium; DeKalb, IL	W 45–15	14,852	
October 9	3:00 p.m.	at New Mexico State	Aggie Memorial Stadium; Las Cruces, NM	L 17–24	16,036	
October 16	3:00 p.m.	Pacific (CA)^{†}	Huskie Stadium; DeKalb, IL	W 21–16	14,475	
October 23	1:00 p.m.	Southwestern Louisiana	Huskie Stadium; DeKalb, IL	L 19–33	9,335	
October 30	6:00 p.m.	at Louisiana Tech	Joe Aillet Stadium; Ruston, LA	L 16–17	9,200	
November 6	1:00 p.m.	at Iowa*	Kinnick Stadium; Iowa City, IoA	L 20–54	64,129	
November 13	1:30 p.m.	at Ole Miss*	Vaught–Hemingway Stadium; Oxford, MS	L 0–44	20,500	
*Non-conference game; ^{†}Homecoming; All times are in Central time

== Roster ==
1993 Northern Illinois Huskies football team roster
Players
Coaches
Offense

Pos.	#	Name	Class
TE	82	Mitch Jacoby	Fr
RB	42	LeShon Johnson

Defense

Pos.	#	Name	Class
DT	78	Hollis Thomas

Special teams

Pos.	#	Name	Class

Head coach

- Charlie Sadler

Coordinators/assistant coaches

Legend

- (C) Team captain
- (S) Suspended
- (I) Ineligible
- Injured
- Redshirt
