= 1993 Arkansas State Indians football team =

American college football season

1993 Arkansas State Indians football
- Conference: Big West Conference
- Record: 2–8–1 (1–5 Big West)
- Head coach: John Bobo (1st season)
- Offensive coordinator: Jody Allen (1st season)
- Defensive coordinator: Pete McGinnis (2nd season)
- Home stadium: Indian Stadium

1993 Big West Conference football standings
| | Conf. | | | | | Overall |
| Team | W | | L | | T | W | | L | | T |
|---|---|---|---|---|---|---|---|---|---|---|
| Southwestern Louisiana + | 5 | – | 1 | – | 0 | 8 | – | 3 | – | 0 |
| Utah State + | 5 | – | 1 | – | 0 | 7 | – | 5 | – | 0 |
| Nevada | 4 | – | 2 | – | 0 | 7 | – | 4 | – | 0 |
| New Mexico State | 4 | – | 2 | – | 0 | 5 | – | 6 | – | 0 |
| Northern Illinois | 3 | – | 3 | – | 0 | 4 | – | 7 | – | 0 |
| Pacific (CA) | 2 | – | 4 | – | 0 | 3 | – | 8 | – | 0 |
| UNLV | 2 | – | 4 | – | 0 | 3 | – | 8 | – | 0 |
| Louisiana Tech | 2 | – | 4 | – | 0 | 2 | – | 9 | – | 0 |
| San Jose State | 2 | – | 4 | – | 0 | 2 | – | 9 | – | 0 |
| Arkansas State | 1 | – | 5 | – | 0 | 2 | – | 8 | – | 1 |
+ – Conference co-champions

The 1993 Arkansas State Indians football team represented Arkansas State University as a member of the Big West Conference during the 1993 NCAA Division I-A football season. Led by first-year head coach John Bobo, the Indians compiled an overall record of 2–8–1 overall with a mark of 1–5 in conference play, placing last out of ten teams in the Big West.

== Schedule ==
| Date | Opponent | Site | Result | Attendance | Source |
|---|---|---|---|---|---|
| September 4 | at No. 8 Florida* | Ben Hill Griffin Stadium; Gainesville, FL | L 6–44 | 84,051 | |
| September 11 | New Mexico State | Indian Stadium; Jonesboro, AR | L 19–22 | | |
| September 18 | at Northern Illinois | Huskie Stadium; DeKalb, IL | L 7–23 | 13,902 | |
| September 25 | Southern Illinois* | Indian Stadium; Jonesboro, AR | W 27–6 | 8,754 | |
| October 2 | at Louisiana Tech | Joe Aillet Stadium; Ruston, LA | L 3–17 | 14,000 | |
| October 9 | at Memphis State* | Liberty Bowl Memorial Stadium; Memphis, TN (Paint Bucket Bowl) | L 3–45 | 18,705 | |
| October 16 | Southwestern Louisiana^{†} | Indian Stadium; Jonesboro, AR | L 3–19 | | |
| October 23 | at Mississippi State* | Scott Field; Starkville, MS | T 15–15 | 33,878 | |
| November 6 | Northeast Louisiana* | Indian Stadium; Jonesboro, AR | L 10–42 | | |
| November 13 | at Pacific (CA) | Stagg Memorial Stadium; Stockton, CA | L 6–20 | | |
| November 20 | Nevada | Indian Stadium; Jonesboro, AR | W 23–21 | | |
*Non-conference game; ^{†}Homecoming; Rankings from AP Poll released prior to the game
