= 1993 UNLV Rebels football team =

American college football season

1993 UNLV Rebels football
- Conference: Big West Conference
- Record: 3–8 (2–4 Big West)
- Head coach: Jim Strong (4th season)
- Offensive coordinator: George Haffner (1st season)
- Defensive coordinator: Dave Wommack (2nd season)
- Home stadium: Sam Boyd Silver Bowl

1993 Big West Conference football standings
	Conf.					Overall
Team	W		L		T	W		L		T
Southwestern Louisiana +	5	–	1	–	0	8	–	3	–	0
Utah State +	5	–	1	–	0	7	–	5	–	0
Nevada	4	–	2	–	0	7	–	4	–	0
New Mexico State	4	–	2	–	0	5	–	6	–	0
Northern Illinois	3	–	3	–	0	4	–	7	–	0
Pacific (CA)	2	–	4	–	0	3	–	8	–	0
UNLV	2	–	4	–	0	3	–	8	–	0
Louisiana Tech	2	–	4	–	0	2	–	9	–	0
San Jose State	2	–	4	–	0	2	–	9	–	0
Arkansas State	1	–	5	–	0	2	–	8	–	1
+ – Conference co-champions

The 1993 UNLV Rebels football team was an American football team that represented the University of Nevada, Las Vegas (UNLV) as a member of the Big West Conference during the 1993 NCAA Division I-A football season. In their fourth and final year under head coach Jim Strong, the Rebels compiled an overall record of 3–8 with a mark of 2–4 in conference play, placing in a four-way tie for sixth in the Big West. The team played home games at the Sam Boyd Silver Bowl in Whitney, Nevada.

== Schedule ==
Date	Opponent	Site	Result	Attendance	Source
September 4	at No. 22 Clemson*	Memorial Stadium; Clemson, SC	L 14–24	65,426	
September 11	at UTEP*	Sun Bowl; El Paso, TX	L 24–41	39,612	
September 18	Central Michigan*	Sam Boyd Silver Bowl; Whitney, NV	W 33–20	14,056	
September 25	at Kansas State*	KSU Stadium; Manhattan, KS	L 20–36	25,817	
October 2	at Nevada*	Mackay Stadium; Reno, NV (Fremont Cannon)	L 14–49	26,866	
October 9	Cal State Northridge*	Sam Boyd Silver Bowl; Whitney, NV	L 18–24	10,380	
October 23	Utah State	Sam Boyd Silver Bowl; Whitney, NV	L 26–33	12,284	
October 30	New Mexico State	Sam Boyd Silver Bowl; Whitney, NV	L 40–52	8,032	
November 6	at Louisiana Tech	Joe Aillet Stadium; Ruston, LA	W 28–23	17,200	
November 13	at San Jose State	Spartan Stadium; San Jose, CA	W 28–14	8,769	
November 20	Southwestern Louisiana*	Sam Boyd Silver Bowl; Whitney, NV	L 14–31	7,721	
*Non-conference game; Rankings from Coaches' Poll released prior to the game
