= 1993 Southwestern Louisiana Ragin' Cajuns football team =

American college football season

1993 Southwestern Louisiana Ragin' Cajuns football

Big West co-champion
- Conference: Big West Conference
- Record: 8–3 (5–1 Big West)
- Head coach: Nelson Stokley (8th season)
- Offensive coordinator: Lewis Cook (2nd season)
- Defensive coordinator: Vic Eumont (1st season)
- Home stadium: Cajun Field

1993 Big West Conference football standings
| | Conf. | | | | | Overall |
| Team | W | | L | | T | W | | L | | T |
|---|---|---|---|---|---|---|---|---|---|---|
| Southwestern Louisiana + | 5 | – | 1 | – | 0 | 8 | – | 3 | – | 0 |
| Utah State + | 5 | – | 1 | – | 0 | 7 | – | 5 | – | 0 |
| Nevada | 4 | – | 2 | – | 0 | 7 | – | 4 | – | 0 |
| New Mexico State | 4 | – | 2 | – | 0 | 5 | – | 6 | – | 0 |
| Northern Illinois | 3 | – | 3 | – | 0 | 4 | – | 7 | – | 0 |
| Pacific (CA) | 2 | – | 4 | – | 0 | 3 | – | 8 | – | 0 |
| UNLV | 2 | – | 4 | – | 0 | 3 | – | 8 | – | 0 |
| Louisiana Tech | 2 | – | 4 | – | 0 | 2 | – | 9 | – | 0 |
| San Jose State | 2 | – | 4 | – | 0 | 2 | – | 9 | – | 0 |
| Arkansas State | 1 | – | 5 | – | 0 | 2 | – | 8 | – | 1 |
+ – Conference co-champions

The 1993 Southwestern Louisiana Ragin' Cajuns football team was an American football team that represented the University of Southwestern Louisiana (now known as the University of Louisiana at Lafayette) in the Big West Conference during the 1993 NCAA Division I-A football season. In their eighth year under head coach Nelson Stokley, the team compiled an 8–3 record and as Big West co-champion.

== Schedule ==
| Date | Opponent | Site | Result | Attendance | Source |
|---|---|---|---|---|---|
| September 4 | Utah State | Cajun Field; Lafayette, LA | L 13–34 | 21,637 | |
| September 11 | at Miami (OH)* | Yager Stadium; Oxford, OH | L 28–29 | 14,482 | |
| September 18 | Memphis State* | Cajun Field; Lafayette, LA | W 17–15 | 18,524 | |
| October 2 | Southern Miss* | Cajun Field; Lafayette, LA | W 13–7 | 22,853 | |
| October 9 | at Tulane* | Louisiana Superdome; New Orleans, LA | W 36–15 | 25,970 | |
| October 16 | at Arkansas State | Indian Stadium; Jonesboro, AR | W 19–3 | 10,396 | |
| October 23 | at Northern Illinois | Huskie Stadium; DeKalb, IL | W 33–19 | 9,335 | |
| October 30 | San Jose State | Cajun Field; Lafayette, LA | W 24–13 | 27,814 | |
| November 6 | at No. 9 Florida* | Ben Hill Griffin Stadium; Gainesville, FL | L 14–61 | 83,711 | |
| November 20 | at UNLV | Sam Boyd Silver Bowl; Whitney, NV | W 31–14 | 7,721 | |
| November 27 | Louisiana Tech | Cajun Field; Lafayette, LA (rivalry) | W 21–17 | 19,127 | |
*Non-conference game; Rankings from AP Poll released prior to the game
