= 1994 Pacific Tigers football team =

American college football season

1994 Pacific Tigers football
- Conference: Big West Conference
- Record: 6–5 (4–2 Big West)
- Head coach: Chuck Shelton (3rd season)
- Offensive coordinator: Bill Bleil (3rd season)
- Offensive scheme: Spread
- Defensive coordinator: Lyle Setencich (1st season)
- Base defense: 3–4
- Home stadium: Stagg Memorial Stadium

1994 Big West Conference football standings
	Conf.					Overall
Team	W		L		T	W		L		T
Nevada +	5	–	1	–	0	9	–	2	–	0
UNLV +	5	–	1	–	0	7	–	5	–	0
Southwestern Louisiana +	5	–	1	–	0	6	–	5	–	0
Pacific (CA)	4	–	2	–	0	6	–	5	–	0
Northern Illinois	3	–	3	–	0	4	–	7	–	0
San Jose State	3	–	3	–	0	3	–	8	–	0
Utah State	2	–	4	–	0	3	–	8	–	0
New Mexico State	2	–	4	–	0	3	–	8	–	0
Louisiana Tech	1	–	5	–	0	3	–	8	–	0
Arkansas State	0	–	6	–	0	1	–	10	–	0
+ – Conference co-champions

The 1994 Pacific Tigers football team represented the University of the Pacific as a member of Big West Conference during the 1994 NCAA Division I-A football season. Led by third-year head coach Chuck Shelton, Pacific compiled an overall record 6–5 with a conference mark of 4–2, placing fourth in the Big West. The Tigers offense scored 252 points while the defense allowed 275 points.

== Schedule ==
Date	Time	Opponent	Site	Result	Attendance	Source
September 3		UC Davis*	Stagg Memorial Stadium; Stockton, CA	W 24–7		
September 10	5:00 p.m.	at Minnesota*	Hubert H. Humphrey Metrodome; Minneapolis, MN	L 7–33	37,719	
September 17		Southwest Texas State*	Stagg Memorial Stadium; Stockton, CA	W 27–7	7,505	
September 24	11:00 a.m.	at No. 2 Nebraska*	Memorial Stadium; Lincoln, NE	L 21–70	75,273	
October 8		at Nevada	Mackay Stadium; Reno, NV	L 26–38	19,724	
October 15	7:00 p.m.	Northern Illinois	Stagg Memorial Stadium; Stockton, CA	W 41–32		
October 22		at Arkansas State	Indian Stadium; Jonesboro, AR	W 30–16		
October 29		Utah State^{†}	Stagg Memorial Stadium; Stockton, CA	W 28–6	10,085	
November 5		at Oregon State*	Parker Stadium; Corvallis, OR	L 12–24	24,282	
November 12		at New Mexico State	Aggie Memorial Stadium; Las Cruces, NM	W 21–14		
November 19		San Jose State	Stagg Memorial Stadium; Stockton, CA (Victory Bell)	L 15–28		
*Non-conference game; ^{†}Homecoming; Rankings from AP Poll released prior to the game; All times are in Pacific time
