= 1994 Southwestern Louisiana Ragin' Cajuns football team =

American college football season

1994 Southwestern Louisiana Ragin' Cajuns football

Big West co-champion
- Conference: Big West Conference
- Record: 6–5 (5–1 Big West)
- Head coach: Nelson Stokley (9th season)
- Offensive coordinator: Lewis Cook (3rd season)
- Home stadium: Cajun Field

1994 Big West Conference football standings
	Conf.					Overall
Team	W		L		T	W		L		T
Nevada +	5	–	1	–	0	9	–	2	–	0
UNLV +	5	–	1	–	0	7	–	5	–	0
Southwestern Louisiana +	5	–	1	–	0	6	–	5	–	0
Pacific (CA)	4	–	2	–	0	6	–	5	–	0
Northern Illinois	3	–	3	–	0	4	–	7	–	0
San Jose State	3	–	3	–	0	3	–	8	–	0
Utah State	2	–	4	–	0	3	–	8	–	0
New Mexico State	2	–	4	–	0	3	–	8	–	0
Louisiana Tech	1	–	5	–	0	3	–	8	–	0
Arkansas State	0	–	6	–	0	1	–	10	–	0
+ – Conference co-champions

The 1994 Southwestern Louisiana Ragin' Cajuns football team was an American football team that represented the University of Southwestern Louisiana (now known as the University of Louisiana at Lafayette) in the Big West Conference during the 1994 NCAA Division I-A football season. In their ninth year under head coach Nelson Stokley, the Ragin' Cajuns compiled an 6–5 record and as Big West co-champion.

== Schedule ==
Date	Opponent	Site	Result	Attendance	Source
September 3	at Kansas State*	KSU Stadium; Manhattan, KS	L 6–34	38,216	
September 10	Northern Illinois	Cajun Field; Lafayette, LA	W 29–9	19,083	
September 17	Troy State*	Cajun Field; Lafayette, LA	L 20–39		
September 24	at San Jose State	Spartan Stadium; San Jose, CA	L 28–31		
October 1	at Louisiana Tech	Joe Aillet Stadium; Ruston, LA (rivalry)	W 13–3	21,800	
October 8	Arkansas State	Cajun Field; Lafayette, LA	W 26–0		
October 15	at Southern Miss*	M. M. Roberts Stadium; Hattiesburg, MS	L 20–43	14,592	
October 22	at Utah State	Romney Stadium; Logan, UT	W 27–25	20,016	
November 5	UNLV	Cajun Field; Lafayette, LA	W 28–27	17,013	
November 12	at Texas Tech*	Jones Stadium; Lubbock, TX	L 7–39	27,636	
November 19	Western Michigan*	Cajun Field; Lafayette, LA	W 17–14		
*Non-conference game
