= 1993 San Jose State Spartans football team =

American college football season

1993 San Jose State Spartans football
- Conference: Big West Conference
- Record: 2–9 (2–4 Big West)
- Head coach: John Ralston (1st season)
- Offensive coordinator: Roger Theder (1st season)
- Defensive coordinator: Tom Gadd (1st season)
- Home stadium: Spartan Stadium

1993 Big West Conference football standings
	Conf.					Overall
Team	W		L		T	W		L		T
Southwestern Louisiana +	5	–	1	–	0	8	–	3	–	0
Utah State +	5	–	1	–	0	7	–	5	–	0
Nevada	4	–	2	–	0	7	–	4	–	0
New Mexico State	4	–	2	–	0	5	–	6	–	0
Northern Illinois	3	–	3	–	0	4	–	7	–	0
Pacific (CA)	2	–	4	–	0	3	–	8	–	0
UNLV	2	–	4	–	0	3	–	8	–	0
Louisiana Tech	2	–	4	–	0	2	–	9	–	0
San Jose State	2	–	4	–	0	2	–	9	–	0
Arkansas State	1	–	5	–	0	2	–	8	–	1
+ – Conference co-champions

The 1993 San Jose State Spartans football team represented San Jose State University during the 1993 NCAA Division I-A football season as a member of the Big West Conference. The team was led by head coach John Ralston, in his first year as head coach at San Jose State. They played home games at Spartan Stadium in San Jose, California. The Spartans finished the 1993 season with a record of two wins and nine losses (2–9, 2–4 Big West).

== Schedule ==
Date	Opponent	Site	Result	Attendance	Source
September 4	at Louisville*	Cardinal Stadium; Louisville, KY	L 24–31	35,923	
September 11	at No. 23 Stanford*	Stanford Stadium; Stanford, CA (rivalry)	L 28–31	47,500	
September 18	Wyoming*	Spartan Stadium; San Jose, CA	L 25–36	14,265	
September 25	at No. 20 California*	California Memorial Stadium; Berkeley, CA	L 13–46		
October 2	at No. 15 Washington*	Husky Stadium; Seattle, WA	L 17–52	67,976	
October 16	at New Mexico State	Aggie Memorial Stadium; Las Cruces, NM	W 52–13		
October 23	Louisiana Tech^{†}	Spartan Stadium; San Jose, CA	W 31–6	15,145	
October 30	at Southwestern Louisiana	Cajun Field; Lafayette, LA	L 13–24	27,814	
November 6	at Nevada	Mackay Stadium; Reno, NV	L 45–46	28,631	
November 13	UNLV	Spartan Stadium; San Jose, CA	L 14–28	8,769	
November 20	Pacific (CA)	Spartan Stadium; San Jose, CA (Victory Bell)	L 20–24	8,134	
*Non-conference game; ^{†}Homecoming; Rankings from AP Poll released prior to the game

== Team players in the NFL ==
No San Jose State Spartans were selected in the 1994 NFL draft.

The following finished their college career in 1993, were not drafted, but played in the NFL.

Player	Position	First NFL team
Jeff Garcia	Quarterback	1999 San Francisco 49ers
