= 1993 Nevada Wolf Pack football team =

American college football season

1993 Nevada Wolf Pack football
- Conference: Big West Conference
- Record: 7–4 (4–2 Big West)
- Head coach: Jeff Horton (1st season)
- Offensive coordinator: Steve Hagen (2nd season)
- Offensive scheme: Air Wolf
- Defensive coordinator: Ken Mizell (1st season)
- Base defense: 4–3
- Home stadium: Mackay Stadium

1993 Big West Conference football standings
	Conf.					Overall
Team	W		L		T	W		L		T
Southwestern Louisiana +	5	–	1	–	0	8	–	3	–	0
Utah State +	5	–	1	–	0	7	–	5	–	0
Nevada	4	–	2	–	0	7	–	4	–	0
New Mexico State	4	–	2	–	0	5	–	6	–	0
Northern Illinois	3	–	3	–	0	4	–	7	–	0
Pacific (CA)	2	–	4	–	0	3	–	8	–	0
UNLV	2	–	4	–	0	3	–	8	–	0
Louisiana Tech	2	–	4	–	0	2	–	9	–	0
San Jose State	2	–	4	–	0	2	–	9	–	0
Arkansas State	1	–	5	–	0	2	–	8	–	1
+ – Conference co-champions

The 1993 Nevada Wolf Pack football team represented the University of Nevada, Reno during the 1993 NCAA Division I-A football season. Nevada competed as a member of the Big West Conference (BWC). The Wolf Pack were led by Jeff Horton in his first and only year as head coach and played their home games at Mackay Stadium.

== Schedule ==
Date	Time	Opponent	Site	Result	Attendance
September 4	11:00 a.m.	at Wisconsin*	Camp Randall Stadium; Madison, WI	L 17–35	66,557
September 11		Boise State*	Mackay Stadium; Reno, NV (rivalry)	W 38–10	28,523
September 18		Texas Southern*	Mackay Stadium; Reno, NV	W 63–14	20,949
September 25	1:00 p.m.	Northern Illinois	Mackay Stadium; Reno, NV	L 42–46	22,023
October 2		UNLV	Mackay Stadium; Reno, NV (Fremont Cannon)	W 49–14	26,866
October 16		at Utah State	Romney Stadium; Logan, UT	W 48–44	
October 23		Weber State*^{†}	Mackay Stadium; Reno, NV	L 30–47	24,089
October 30		at Pacific (CA)	Stagg Memorial Stadium; Stockton, CA	W 31–23	
November 6		San Jose State	Mackay Stadium; Reno, NV	W 46–45	28,631
November 13		at New Mexico State	Aggie Memorial Stadium; Las Cruces, NM	W 34–14	
November 20		at Arkansas State	Indian Stadium; Jonesboro, AR	L 21–23	
*Non-conference game; ^{†}Homecoming; All times are in Pacific time
