= 1994 San Jose State Spartans football team =

American college football season

1994 San Jose State Spartans football
- Conference: Big West Conference
- Record: 3–8 (3–3 Big West)
- Head coach: John Ralston (2nd season)
- Offensive coordinator: Roger Theder (2nd season)
- Defensive coordinator: Tom Gadd (2nd season)
- Home stadium: Spartan Stadium

1994 Big West Conference football standings
| | Conf. | | | | | Overall |
| Team | W | | L | | T | W | | L | | T |
|---|---|---|---|---|---|---|---|---|---|---|
| Nevada + | 5 | – | 1 | – | 0 | 9 | – | 2 | – | 0 |
| UNLV + | 5 | – | 1 | – | 0 | 7 | – | 5 | – | 0 |
| Southwestern Louisiana + | 5 | – | 1 | – | 0 | 6 | – | 5 | – | 0 |
| Pacific (CA) | 4 | – | 2 | – | 0 | 6 | – | 5 | – | 0 |
| Northern Illinois | 3 | – | 3 | – | 0 | 4 | – | 7 | – | 0 |
| San Jose State | 3 | – | 3 | – | 0 | 3 | – | 8 | – | 0 |
| Utah State | 2 | – | 4 | – | 0 | 3 | – | 8 | – | 0 |
| New Mexico State | 2 | – | 4 | – | 0 | 3 | – | 8 | – | 0 |
| Louisiana Tech | 1 | – | 5 | – | 0 | 3 | – | 8 | – | 0 |
| Arkansas State | 0 | – | 6 | – | 0 | 1 | – | 10 | – | 0 |
+ – Conference co-champions

The 1994 San Jose State Spartans football team represented San Jose State University during the 1994 NCAA Division I-A football season as a member of the Big West Conference. The team was led by head coach John Ralston, in his second year as head coach at San Jose State. They played home games at Spartan Stadium in San Jose, California. The Spartans finished the 1994 season with a record of three wins and eight losses (3–8, 3–3 Big West).

== Schedule ==
| Date | Opponent | Site | Result | Attendance | Source |
|---|---|---|---|---|---|
| September 3 | at Fresno State* | Bulldog Stadium; Fresno, California (rivalry) | L 13–45 | 36,868 | |
| September 10 | Baylor* | Spartan Stadium; San Jose, CA | L 20–54 | 11,625 | |
| September 17 | at Stanford* | Stanford Stadium; Stanford, CA (rivalry) | L 20–51 | 34,321 | |
| September 24 | Southwestern Louisiana | Spartan Stadium; San Jose, CA | W 31–28 | 10,718 | |
| October 1 | at California* | California Memorial Stadium; Berkeley, CA | L 0–55 | | |
| October 8 | at No. 12 Washington* | Husky Stadium; Seattle, WA | L 20–34 | 69,448 | |
| October 22 | Nevada^{†} | Spartan Stadium; San Jose, CA | L 10–42 | 14,125 | |
| October 29 | at UNLV | Sam Boyd Stadium; Whitney, NV | L 10–23 | 7,729 | |
| November 5 | New Mexico State | Spartan Stadium; San Jose, CA | L 21–24 | 5,247 | |
| November 12 | at Louisiana Tech | Joe Aillet Stadium; Ruston, LA | W 27–6 | 10,110 | |
| November 19 | at Pacific (CA) | Stagg Memorial Stadium; Stockton, CA (Victory Bell) | W 28–15 | | |
*Non-conference game; ^{†}Homecoming; Rankings from AP Poll released prior to the game

== Team players in the NFL ==
No San Jose State Spartans were selected in the 1995 NFL draft.

The following finished their college career in 1994, were not drafted, but played in the NFL.

| Player | Position | First NFL team |
| Jerry Reese | Wide receiver | 1997 Buffalo Bills |
| Joe Nedney | Kicker | 1996 Miami Dolphins |

== Game summaries ==
=== At Fresno State ===
| | 1 | 2 | 3 | 4 | Total |
|---|---|---|---|---|---|
| Spartans | | | | | 0 |
| Bulldogs | | | | | 0 |

=== Baylor ===
| | 1 | 2 | 3 | 4 | Total |
|---|---|---|---|---|---|
| Bears | | | | | 0 |
| Spartans | | | | | 0 |

=== At Stanford ===
| | 1 | 2 | 3 | 4 | Total |
|---|---|---|---|---|---|
| Spartans | | | | | 0 |
| Cardinal | | | | | 0 |

=== Southwestern Louisiana ===
| | 1 | 2 | 3 | 4 | Total |
|---|---|---|---|---|---|
| Ragin' Cajuns | | | | | 0 |
| Spartans | | | | | 0 |

=== At California ===
| | 1 | 2 | 3 | 4 | Total |
|---|---|---|---|---|---|
| Spartans | 0 | 0 | 0 | 0 | 0 |
| Golden Bears | | | | | 0 |

=== At No. 12 Washington ===
| | 1 | 2 | 3 | 4 | Total |
|---|---|---|---|---|---|
| Spartans | | | | | 0 |
| No. 12 Huskies | | | | | 0 |

=== Nevada ===
| | 1 | 2 | 3 | 4 | Total |
|---|---|---|---|---|---|
| Wolf Pack | | | | | 0 |
| Spartans | | | | | 0 |

=== At UNLV ===
| | 1 | 2 | 3 | 4 | Total |
|---|---|---|---|---|---|
| Spartans | | | | | 0 |
| Rebels | | | | | 0 |

=== New Mexico State ===
| | 1 | 2 | 3 | 4 | Total |
|---|---|---|---|---|---|
| Aggies | | | | | 0 |
| Spartans | | | | | 0 |

=== At Louisiana Tech ===
| | 1 | 2 | 3 | 4 | Total |
|---|---|---|---|---|---|
| Spartans | | | | | 0 |
| Bulldogs | | | | | 0 |

=== At Pacific (CA) ===
| | 1 | 2 | 3 | 4 | Total |
|---|---|---|---|---|---|
| Spartans | | | | | 0 |
| Tigers | | | | | 0 |
