= 1994 Louisiana Tech Bulldogs football team =

American college football season

1994 Louisiana Tech Bulldogs football
- Conference: Big West Conference
- Record: 3–8 (1–5 Big West)
- Head coach: Joe Raymond Peace (7th season)
- Defensive coordinator: Art Kaufman (3rd season)
- Captains: Jason Cooper; Fred Price
- Home stadium: Joe Aillet Stadium

1994 Big West Conference football standings
	Conf.					Overall
Team	W		L		T	W		L		T
Nevada +	5	–	1	–	0	9	–	2	–	0
UNLV +	5	–	1	–	0	7	–	5	–	0
Southwestern Louisiana +	5	–	1	–	0	6	–	5	–	0
Pacific (CA)	4	–	2	–	0	6	–	5	–	0
Northern Illinois	3	–	3	–	0	4	–	7	–	0
San Jose State	3	–	3	–	0	3	–	8	–	0
Utah State	2	–	4	–	0	3	–	8	–	0
New Mexico State	2	–	4	–	0	3	–	8	–	0
Louisiana Tech	1	–	5	–	0	3	–	8	–	0
Arkansas State	0	–	6	–	0	1	–	10	–	0
+ – Conference co-champions

The 1994 Louisiana Tech Bulldogs football team was an American football team that represented Louisiana Tech University as a member of the Big West Conference during the 1994 NCAA Division I-A football season. In their seventh year under head coach Joe Raymond Peace, the team compiled a 3–8 record.

== Schedule ==
Date	Opponent	Site	Result	Attendance	Source
September 3	at Baylor*	Floyd Casey Stadium; Waco, TX	L 3–44	28,769	
September 10	Houston*	Joe Aillet Stadium; Ruston, LA	W 32–7	17,408	
September 17	at South Carolina*	Williams–Brice Stadium; Columbia, SC	L 6–31	65,498	
October 1	Southwestern Louisiana	Joe Aillet Stadium; Ruston, LA (rivalry)	L 3–13	21,800	
October 8	at UNLV	Sam Boyd Stadium; Whitney, NV	L 20–24	10,358	
October 15	Utah State	Joe Aillet Stadium; Ruston, LA	L 3–7	5,030	
October 22	at Northern Illinois	Huskie Stadium; DeKalb, IL	L 17–27	12,968	
October 29	at West Virginia*	Mountaineer Field; Morgantown, WV	L 16–52	48,284	
November 5	Northwestern State*	Joe Aillet Stadium; Ruston, LA (rivalry)	W 38–28	16,020	
November 12	San Jose State	Joe Aillet Stadium; Ruston, LA	L 6–27	10,110	
November 19	at Arkansas State	Indian Stadium; Jonesboro, AR	W 20–14	5,736	
*Non-conference game
