= 1993 New Mexico State Aggies football team =

American college football season

1993 New Mexico State Aggies football
- Conference: Big West Conference
- Record: 5–6 (4–2 Big West)
- Head coach: Jim Hess (4th season)
- Home stadium: Aggie Memorial Stadium

1993 Big West Conference football standings
	Conf.					Overall
Team	W		L		T	W		L		T
Southwestern Louisiana +	5	–	1	–	0	8	–	3	–	0
Utah State +	5	–	1	–	0	7	–	5	–	0
Nevada	4	–	2	–	0	7	–	4	–	0
New Mexico State	4	–	2	–	0	5	–	6	–	0
Northern Illinois	3	–	3	–	0	4	–	7	–	0
Pacific (CA)	2	–	4	–	0	3	–	8	–	0
UNLV	2	–	4	–	0	3	–	8	–	0
Louisiana Tech	2	–	4	–	0	2	–	9	–	0
San Jose State	2	–	4	–	0	2	–	9	–	0
Arkansas State	1	–	5	–	0	2	–	8	–	1
+ – Conference co-champions

The 1993 New Mexico State Aggies football team was an American football team that represented New Mexico State University in the Big West Conference during the 1993 NCAA Division I-A football season. In their fourth year under head coach Jim Hess, the Aggies compiled a 5–6 record. The team played its home games at Aggie Memorial Stadium in Las Cruces, New Mexico.

== Schedule ==
Date	Opponent	Site	Result	Attendance	Source
September 4	at Kansas State*	KSU Stadium; Manhattan, KS	L 10–34	25,936	
September 11	at Arkansas State	Indian Stadium; Jonesboro, AR	W 22–19		
September 18	UTEP*	Aggie Memorial Stadium; Las Cruces, NM (rivalry)	W 31–14	31,839	
September 25	at New Mexico*	University Stadium; Albuquerque, NM (rivalry)	L 7–42		
October 9	Northern Illinois	Aggie Memorial Stadium; Las Cruces, NM	W 24–17	16,036	
October 16	San Jose State	Aggie Memorial Stadium; Las Cruces, NM	L 13–52		
October 23	at Pacific (CA)	Stagg Memorial Stadium; Stockton, CA	W 27–23		
October 30	at UNLV	Sam Boyd Stadium; Whitney, NV	W 52–40	8,032	
November 6	at No. 8 Auburn*	Jordan-Hare Stadium; Auburn, AL	L 14–55	82,128	
November 13	Nevada*	Aggie Memorial Stadium; Las Cruces, NM	L 14–34		
November 20	Utah State*	Aggie Memorial Stadium; Las Cruces, NM	L 17–20	17,622	
*Non-conference game; Rankings from AP Poll released prior to the game
