= 1994 Nevada Wolf Pack football team =

American college football season

1994 Nevada Wolf Pack football

Big West co-champion
- Conference: Big West Conference
- Record: 9–2 (5–1 Big West)
- Head coach: Chris Ault (18th season)
- Offensive coordinator: Bobby Petrino (1st season)
- Offensive scheme: Air Wolf
- Co-defensive coordinators: Steve Caldwell (1st season); Don Dunn (1st season)
- Base defense: 4–3
- Home stadium: Mackay Stadium

1994 Big West Conference football standings
| | Conf. | | | | | Overall |
| Team | W | | L | | T | W | | L | | T |
|---|---|---|---|---|---|---|---|---|---|---|
| Nevada + | 5 | – | 1 | – | 0 | 9 | – | 2 | – | 0 |
| UNLV + | 5 | – | 1 | – | 0 | 7 | – | 5 | – | 0 |
| Southwestern Louisiana + | 5 | – | 1 | – | 0 | 6 | – | 5 | – | 0 |
| Pacific (CA) | 4 | – | 2 | – | 0 | 6 | – | 5 | – | 0 |
| Northern Illinois | 3 | – | 3 | – | 0 | 4 | – | 7 | – | 0 |
| San Jose State | 3 | – | 3 | – | 0 | 3 | – | 8 | – | 0 |
| Utah State | 2 | – | 4 | – | 0 | 3 | – | 8 | – | 0 |
| New Mexico State | 2 | – | 4 | – | 0 | 3 | – | 8 | – | 0 |
| Louisiana Tech | 1 | – | 5 | – | 0 | 3 | – | 8 | – | 0 |
| Arkansas State | 0 | – | 6 | – | 0 | 1 | – | 10 | – | 0 |
+ – Conference co-champions

The 1994 Nevada Wolf Pack football team represented the University of Nevada, Reno during the 1994 NCAA Division I-A football season. Nevada competed as a member of the Big West Conference (BWC). The Wolf Pack were led by Chris Ault in his 18th overall and 1st straight season since taking over as head coach for the second time. They played their home games at Mackay Stadium.

== Schedule ==
| Date | Time | Opponent | Site | Result | Attendance | Source |
|---|---|---|---|---|---|---|
| September 3 | | Northern Arizona* | Mackay Stadium; Reno, NV | W 30–27 | 20,105 | |
| September 10 | | Arkansas State | Mackay Stadium; Reno, NV | W 18–0 | 19,337 | |
| September 17 | | at Boise State* | Bronco Stadium; Boise, ID (rivalry) | L 27–37 | 21,669 | |
| September 24 | 7:00 p.m. | Northeast Louisiana* | Mackay Stadium; Reno, NV | W 34–22 | 20,316 | |
| October 1 | 11:00 a.m. | at Northern Illinois | Huskie Stadium; DeKalb, IL | W 35–31 | | |
| October 8 | | Pacific (CA) | Mackay Stadium; Reno, NV | W 38–26 | 19,724 | |
| October 15 | | New Mexico State^{†} | Mackay Stadium; Reno, NV | W 45–24 | 22,142 | |
| October 22 | | at San Jose State | Spartan Stadium; San Jose, CA | W 42–10 | | |
| November 5 | | at Fresno State* | Bulldog Stadium; Fresno, CA | W 62–35 | 32,328 | |
| November 12 | | Utah State | Mackay Stadium; Reno, NV | W 56–28 | 21,562 | |
| November 19 | | at UNLV | Sam Boyd Stadium; Whitney, NV (Fremont Cannon) | L 27–32 | | |
*Non-conference game; ^{†}Homecoming; All times are in Pacific time
