= 1994 Northern Illinois Huskies football team =

American college football season

1994 Northern Illinois Huskies football
- Conference: Big West Conference
- Record: 4–7 (3–3 Big West)
- Head coach: Charlie Sadler (4th season)
- Captain: Sean Allgood
- Home stadium: Huskie Stadium

1994 Big West Conference football standings
	Conf.					Overall
Team	W		L		T	W		L		T
Nevada +	5	–	1	–	0	9	–	2	–	0
UNLV +	5	–	1	–	0	7	–	5	–	0
Southwestern Louisiana +	5	–	1	–	0	6	–	5	–	0
Pacific (CA)	4	–	2	–	0	6	–	5	–	0
Northern Illinois	3	–	3	–	0	4	–	7	–	0
San Jose State	3	–	3	–	0	3	–	8	–	0
Utah State	2	–	4	–	0	3	–	8	–	0
New Mexico State	2	–	4	–	0	3	–	8	–	0
Louisiana Tech	1	–	5	–	0	3	–	8	–	0
Arkansas State	0	–	6	–	0	1	–	10	–	0
+ – Conference co-champions

The 1994 Northern Illinois Huskies football team represented Northern Illinois University as a member of the Big West Conference during the 1994 NCAA Division I-A football season. Led by fourth-year head coach Charlie Sadler, the Huskies compiled an overall record of 4–7 with a mark of 3–3 in conference play, tying for fifth place in the Big West. Northern Illinois played home games at Huskie Stadium in DeKalb, Illinois.

== Schedule ==
Date	Time	Opponent	Site	Result	Attendance	Source
September 1	7:00 pm	Oklahoma State*	Huskie Stadium; DeKalb, IL	L 14–31	15,713	
September 10		at Southwestern Louisiana	Cajun Field; Lafayette, LA	L 9–29	19,083	
September 17	1:00 pm	at Illinois*	Memorial Stadium; Champaign, IL	L 10–34	55,327	
September 24	6:30 pm	Eastern Illinois*	Huskie Stadium; DeKalb, IL	W 49–17	11,464	
October 1	1:00 pm	Nevada	Huskie Stadium; DeKalb, IL	L 31–35		
October 8	1:00 pm	New Mexico State	Huskie Stadium; DeKalb, IL	W 48–27		
October 15	9:00 pm	at Pacific (CA)	Stagg Memorial Stadium; Stockton, CA	L 32–41		
October 22	1:00 pm	Louisiana Tech	Huskie Stadium; DeKalb, IL	W 27–17	12,968	
October 29	12:00 pm	at Vanderbilt*	Vanderbilt Stadium; Nashville, TN	L 16–17	22,196	
November 5	1:30 pm	at Arkansas State	Indian Stadium; Jonesboro, AR	W 38–16		
November 12	1:00 pm	at Arkansas*	Razorback Stadium; Fayetteville, AR	L 27–30	37,568	
*Non-conference game; All times are in Central time

== Roster ==
1994 Northern Illinois Huskies football team roster
Players			Coaches
Offense: Pos. / # / Name / Class; TE / 82 / Mitch Jacoby / So	Defense: Pos. / # / Name / Class	Special teams: Pos. / # / Name / Class	Head coach: Charlie Sadler; Coordinators/assistant coaches Legend: (C) Team captain; (S) Suspended; (I) Ineligible; Injured; Redshirt
