= 1994 Valdosta State Blazers football team =

American college football season

1994 Valdosta State Blazers football

NCAA Division II Quarterfinals, L 24–27 ^{(2OT)} vs. North Alabama
- Conference: Gulf South Conference

Ranking
- AFCA: No. 6
- Record: 11–2 (6–1 GSC)
- Head coach: Hal Mumme (3rd season)
- Offensive coordinator: Mike Leach (3rd season)
- Offensive scheme: Air raid
- Defensive coordinator: Mike Major (3rd season)
- Base defense: 4–3
- Home stadium: Cleveland Field

1994 Gulf South Conference football standings
	Conf.					Overall
Team	W		L		T	W		L		T
No. 1 North Alabama $^	7	–	0	–	0	13	–	1	–	0
No. 6 Valdosta State ^	6	–	1	–	0	11	–	2	–	0
Central Arkansas	6	–	1	–	0	8	–	2	–	0
No. 10 West Georgia	4	–	3	–	0	7	–	3	–	0
Delta State	2	–	4	–	1	3	–	5	–	2
Henderson State	1	–	5	–	1	2	–	8	–	1
Livingston	0	–	7	–	0	1	–	9	–	0
Mississippi College *	2	–	5	–	0	4	–	5	–	1
$ – Conference champion; ^ – NCAA Division II playoff participant; * – ineligible for conference championship; Rankings from NCAA Division II Football Committee poll

The 1994 Valdosta State Blazers football team represented Valdosta State University as a member of the Gulf South Conference (GSC) during the 1994 NCAA Division II football season. Led by third-year head coach Hal Mumme, the Blazers finished the season 11–2 and went 6–1 in GSC play to finish second in the conference. The Blazers received a bid to the NCAA Division II playoffs for the first time in program history, losing in the quarterfinals to eventual champion North Alabama. The team played its home games at Cleveland Field in Valdosta, Georgia.

On offense, the Blazers were led by quarterback Chris Hatcher, who won the Harlon Hill Trophy, throwing for 4,076 yards and 55 touchdowns with only 10 interceptions. Hatcher would later go on to become the Blazers' head coach, winning the NCAA Division II championship in 2004.

== Schedule ==
The Blazers' 1994 regular season schedule consisted of seven home games and four away games. In non-conference play, Valdosta State hosted Division III independent Knoxville, Clark Atlanta from the Southern Intercollegiate Athletic Conference, and Division II independent New Haven, and traveled to Division I-AA independent UCF.

In GSC play, the Blazers hosted Fort Valley State, West Georgia, Delta State, and Henderson State, and traveled to Livingston, Mississippi College, and North Alabama.

Date	Time	Opponent	Rank	Site	Result	Attendance
September 3	7:00 p.m.	Knoxville*	No. 18	Cleveland Field; Valdosta, GA	W 36–0	5,117
September 10	1:00 p.m.	at No. 6 (I-AA) UCF*	No. 17	Florida Citrus Bowl; Orlando, FL	W 31–14	22,518
September 17	7:00 p.m.	No. 16 Fort Valley State	No. 10	Cleveland Field; Valdosta, FA	W 58–6	6,097
September 24	7:00 p.m.	Clark Atlanta*	No. 7	Cleveland Field; Valdosta, GA	W 63–6	5,763
October 1	3:00 p.m.	at Livingston	No. 5	Tiger Stadium; Livingston, AL	W 63–0	3,500
October 8	1:00 p.m.	No. 5 New Haven*	No. 3	Cleveland Field; Valdosta, GA	W 38–7	9,368
October 15	2:00 p.m.	No. 15 West Georgia^{†}	No. 3	Cleveland Field; Valdosta, GA (rivalry)	W 49–33	10,214
October 22	7:00 p.m.	at Mississippi College	No. 3	Robinson-Hale Stadium; Clinton, MS	W 24–7	5,719
October 29	7:00 p.m.	Delta State	No. 3	Cleveland Field; Valdosta, GA	W 57–10	6,329
November 5	7:00 p.m.	at No. 1 North Alabama	No. 2	Braly Municipal Stadium; Florence, AL	L 21–38	9,113
November 12	7:00 p.m.	Henderson State	No. 6	Cleveland Field; Valdosta, GA	W 49–7	5,376
November 19	1:00 p.m.	No. 11 Albany State*	No. 6	Cleveland Field; Valdosta, GA (NCAA Division II First Round)	W 14–7	10,948
November 26	2:00 p.m.	at No. 1 North Alabama*	No. 6	Braly Municipal Stadium; Florence, AL (NCAA Division II Quarterfinal)	L 24–27 ^{2OT}	7,039
*Non-conference game; ^{†}Homecoming; Rankings from NCAA Division II Football Committee Poll released prior to the game; All times are in Eastern time

== Rankings ==
Ranking movements Legend: ██ Increase in ranking ██ Decrease in ranking
	Week												
Poll	Pre	1	2	3	4	5	6	7	8	9	10	11	Final
DII FCP	18	17	10	7	5	3	3	3	3	2	6	6	6

== Game summaries ==
=== Knoxville ===
	1	2	3	4	Total
Bulldogs	0	0	0	0	0
No. 18 Blazers	13	9	7	7	36

Statistics

Statistics	KC	VSU
First downs	23	19
Total yards	219	376
Rushing yards	49	79
Passing yards	170	297
Turnovers	3	3
Time of possession	35:39	24:21

Team	Category	Player	Statistics
Knoxville	Passing	Darell Williams	18/37, 165 yards, INT
Knoxville	Rushing	Miles	15 rushes, 48 yards
Knoxville	Receiving	Terrell Bellamy	6 receptions, 46 yards
Valdosta State	Passing	Chris Hatcher	19/36, 291 yards, 3 TD, 2 INT
Valdosta State	Rushing	Dominique Ross	16 rushes, 135 yards, 2 TD
Valdosta State	Receiving	Robert Williams	6 receptions, 120 yards, 2 TD

=== At No. 6 (I-AA) UCF ===
	1	2	3	4	Total
No. 17 Blazers	0	14	10	7	31
No. 6 (I-AA) Golden Knights	7	0	7	0	14

Statistics

Statistics	VSU	UCF
First downs	20	28
Total yards	402	360
Rushing yards	124	125
Passing yards	278	235
Turnovers	0	2
Time of possession	31:33	28:27

Team	Category	Player	Statistics
Valdosta State	Passing	Chris Hatcher	26/34, 278 yards, 2 TD
Valdosta State	Rushing	Dominique Ross	31 rushes, 102 yards, TD
Valdosta State	Receiving	Steve Greer	7 receptions, 79 yards
UCF	Passing	Darin Hinshaw	25/40, 235 yards, 2 TD, INT
UCF	Rushing	Marquette Smith	10 rushes, 46 yards
UCF	Receiving	David Rhodes	8 receptions, 103 yards, TD

=== No. 16 Fort Valley State ===
	1	2	3	4	Total
No. 16 Wildcats	0	6	0	0	6
No. 10 Blazers	21	30	7	0	58

Statistics

Statistics	FVSU	VSU
First downs	9	33
Total yards	215	599
Rushing yards	66	199
Passing yards	149	400
Turnovers	3	3
Time of possession	31:01	28:59

Team	Category	Player	Statistics
Fort Valley State	Passing	Richard Smith	5/15, 138 yards, TD, 2 INT
Fort Valley State	Rushing	Caden Owens	8 rushes, 36 yards
Fort Valley State	Receiving	James Reddick	2 receptions, 65 yards
Valdosta State	Passing	Chris Hatcher	24/31, 317 yards, 5 TD
Valdosta State	Rushing	Dominique Ross	15 rushes, 113 yards, 3 TD
Valdosta State	Receiving	Stanley Flanders	8 receptions, 155 yards, 4 TD

=== Clark Atlanta ===
	1	2	3	4	Total
Panthers	0	0	0	6	6
No. 7 Blazers	21	21	21	0	63

Statistics

Statistics	CAU	VSU
First downs	11	24
Total yards	177	417
Rushing yards	-15	101
Passing yards	192	316
Turnovers	4	2
Time of possession	30:40	29:20

Team	Category	Player	Statistics
Clark Atlanta	Passing	Darius Jones	8/23, 105 yards, TD, 2 INT
Clark Atlanta	Rushing	Ryan	13 rushes, 25 yards
Clark Atlanta	Receiving	Barnes	4 receptions, 56 yards
Valdosta State	Passing	Chris Hatcher	28/37, 267 yards, 7 TD
Valdosta State	Rushing	Dominique Ross	11 rushes, 135 yards, TD
Valdosta State	Receiving	Robert Williams	7 receptions, 53 yards, 3 TD

=== At Livingston ===
	1	2	3	4	Total
No. 5 Blazers	28	21	14	0	63
Tigers	0	0	0	0	0

Statistics

Statistics	VSU	LIV
First downs		
Total yards		
Rushing yards		
Passing yards		
Turnovers		
Time of possession		

Team	Category	Player	Statistics
Valdosta State	Passing		
Valdosta State	Rushing		
Valdosta State	Receiving		
Livingston	Passing		
Livingston	Rushing		
Livingston	Receiving		

=== No. 5 New Haven ===
	1	2	3	4	Total
No. 5 Chargers	0	7	0	0	7
No. 3 Blazers	0	14	14	10	38

Statistics

Statistics	UNH	VSU
First downs		
Total yards		
Rushing yards		
Passing yards		
Turnovers		
Time of possession		

Team	Category	Player	Statistics
New Haven	Passing		
New Haven	Rushing		
New Haven	Receiving		
Valdosta State	Passing		
Valdosta State	Rushing		
Valdosta State	Receiving		

=== No. 15 West Georgia ===
	1	2	3	4	Total
No. 15 Braves	13	14	0	6	33
No. 3 Blazers	0	14	14	21	49

Statistics

Statistics	WGU	VSU
First downs		
Total yards		
Rushing yards		
Passing yards		
Turnovers		
Time of possession		

Team	Category	Player	Statistics
West Georgia	Passing		
West Georgia	Rushing		
West Georgia	Receiving		
Valdosta State	Passing		
Valdosta State	Rushing		
Valdosta State	Receiving		

=== At Mississippi College ===
	1	2	3	4	Total
No. 3 Blazers	7	10	0	7	24
Choctaws	0	7	0	0	7

Statistics

Statistics	VSU	MC
First downs		
Total yards		
Rushing yards		
Passing yards		
Turnovers		
Time of possession		

Team	Category	Player	Statistics
Valdosta State	Passing		
Valdosta State	Rushing		
Valdosta State	Receiving		
Mississippi College	Passing		
Mississippi College	Rushing		
Mississippi College	Receiving		

=== Delta State ===
	1	2	3	4	Total
Statesmen	0	2	0	8	10
No. 3 Blazers	27	16	14	0	57

Statistics

Statistics	DSU	VSU
First downs		
Total yards		
Rushing yards		
Passing yards		
Turnovers		
Time of possession		

Team	Category	Player	Statistics
Delta State	Passing		
Delta State	Rushing		
Delta State	Receiving		
Valdosta State	Passing		
Valdosta State	Rushing		
Valdosta State	Receiving		

=== At No. 1 North Alabama ===
	1	2	3	4	Total
No. 2 Blazers	7	0	0	14	21
No. 1 Lions	10	7	14	7	38

Statistics

Statistics	VSU	NAU
First downs		
Total yards		
Rushing yards		
Passing yards		
Turnovers		
Time of possession		

Team	Category	Player	Statistics
Valdosta State	Passing		
Valdosta State	Rushing		
Valdosta State	Receiving		
North Alabama	Passing		
North Alabama	Rushing		
North Alabama	Receiving		

=== Henderson State ===
	1	2	3	4	Total
Reddies	0	0	0	7	7
No. 6 Blazers	21	7	14	7	49

Statistics

Statistics	HSU	VSU
First downs		
Total yards		
Rushing yards		
Passing yards		
Turnovers		
Time of possession		

Team	Category	Player	Statistics
Henderson State	Passing		
Henderson State	Rushing		
Henderson State	Receiving		
Valdosta State	Passing		
Valdosta State	Rushing		
Valdosta State	Receiving		

=== No. 11 Albany State (NCAA Division II First Round) ===
	1	2	3	4	Total
No. 11 Golden Rams	0	0	7	0	7
No. 6 Blazers	7	7	0	0	14

Statistics

Statistics	ASU	VSU
First downs		
Total yards		
Rushing yards		
Passing yards		
Turnovers		
Time of possession		

Team	Category	Player	Statistics
Albany State	Passing		
Albany State	Rushing		
Albany State	Receiving		
Valdosta State	Passing		
Valdosta State	Rushing		
Valdosta State	Receiving		

=== At No. 1 North Alabama (NCAA Division II Quarterfinals) ===
	1	2	3	4	OT	2OT	Total
No. 6 Blazers	0	3	0	14	7	0	24
No. 1 Lions	7	7	3	0	7	3	27

Statistics

Statistics	VSU	NAU
First downs		
Total yards		
Rushing yards		
Passing yards		
Turnovers		
Time of possession		

Team	Category	Player	Statistics
Valdosta State	Passing		
Valdosta State	Rushing		
Valdosta State	Receiving		
North Alabama	Passing		
North Alabama	Rushing		
North Alabama	Receiving		

== Roster ==
1994 Valdosta State Blazers football team roster
Players
Coaches
Offense

Pos.	#	Name	Class
TE	3	Steve Greer	Sr
TE	5	David Banks	Jr
RB	6	Reggie Walker	Jr
FB	7	Dominique Ross	Jr
WR	8	Gilbert Grantlin	Jr
WR	9	Robert Williams	Sr
QB	10	Coby Bentley	Jr
QB	11	Jamie Deloach	Jr
QB	12	Lance Funderburk	Jr
QB	16	Matt Mumme	Fr
WR	17	Stanley Flanders	Sr
QB	18	Chris Hatcher	Sr
WR	19	Angelo Williams	So
FB	20	David Glisson	So
RB	22	Billy Poole	So
RB	24	Billy White	Jr
WR	25	Sean Pender	Jr
WR	28	Lardell Brinson	Fr
WR	29	Mike Davis	Jr
WR	42	Jonathan Harris	Jr
WR	49	Tirrell Andrews	Fr
OT	51	Tause Letuli	Jr
OT	52	Darryl Cherry	Fr
C	54	Tommy Clark	Sr
OT	65	Drew McPhail	Jr
G	66	Steve Foote	Sr
OT	67	Charlie Walsh	Sr
C	68	Mark Sanders	Fr
OT	69	Josten Clark	Sr
G	70	Jeremy Lundy	So
G	71	Matt Moore	Sr
OT	72	Michael Yates	So
OT	75	Jeremiah Laster	Fr
G	76	James Hubbard	Jr
OT	77	Steve Gates	So
OT	78	Shawn Brannen	So
TE	82	Chad Hunter	Fr
TE	83	Jimmy King	Sr

Defense

Pos.	#	Name	Class
LB	2	Edward Mitchell	Sr
MLB	4	James Lockhart	So
SS	13	Keith Braddock	Sr
CB	15	Jason Jelks	So
CB	21	Archie Lewis	Fr
LB	23	Cornelius Seymour	So
CB	26	Terry Smith	So
SS	27	Tony Hill	Sr
CB	30	Mike Gibson	So
LB	32	Erasmus Harvey	Sr
CB	33	Walt Foy	Sr
LB	34	Tamarcus Smith	So
CB	35	Jamal Stevens	Fr
SS	36	Darrell Mydell	Jr
DT	37	Mike Berry	Sr
FS	38	Eugene Autry	Jr
FS	39	Brad Trout	Jr
NT	40	Andre Randle	Sr
LB	43	Tavaris Smith	Fr
MLB	45	Ryan Branch	So
CB	46	Dennis Vela	So
FS	47	Marcus Johnson	Sr
LB	50	James Sirmans	Jr
LB	50	Wayne Crews	Fr
DE	55	Dennis Hampton	Jr
DE	56	Andre Hampton	Sr
LB	61	Jody Honea	Jr
DT	72	Emanuel Johnson	Sr
NT	74	John Hinson	Sr
DT	80	Matt Fiorelli	Jr
DE	81	Shay Williams	Sr
DE	96	Rodney Rigdon	Jr
DE	97	Jeff Greer	Fr

Special teams

Pos.	#	Name	Class
P	14	David Ashby	Sr
PK	31	Vernon Loree	Sr
P	46	Wayne Devane	Fr

Head coach

- Hal Mumme

Coordinators/assistant coaches

- Mike Leach
  Offensive coordinator/Offensive line
- Mike Major
  Defensive coordinator/Assistant head coach
- Scott Preston
  Running backs
- Mike Fanoga
  Defensive line/Recruiting coordinator
- Dana Holgorsen
  Quarterbacks and receivers/Special teams
- Joe Salas
  Secondary

Legend

- (C) Team captain
- (S) Suspended
- (I) Ineligible
- Injured
- Redshirt

Roster
Last update: November 8, 2023
