= Richard King High School =

Coordinates: 27°43′10.7″N 97°22′13.8″W

Location
- 5225 Gollihar Rd. Corpus Christi, Texas 78412-3317; United States

Information
- School type: Public high school
- Motto: "To the Stars with Knowledge"
- Established: 1965
- School district: Corpus Christi Independent School District
- Principal: Prudence Farrell since ‘21-‘22 SY)
- Teaching staff: 89.22 (FTE)
- Grades: 9-12
- Enrollment: 1,549 (2019-20)
- Student to teacher ratio: 17.36
- Colors: Forest green and white
- Athletics conference: UIL Class AAAAA
- Mascot: Mustangs/Lady Mustangs
- Newspaper: Hoof Beat
- Website: Richard King High School

Richard King High School, commonly referred to as King, is one of six secondary schools that are part of the Corpus Christi Independent School District in Corpus Christi, Texas. It is one of the largest high schools within the Corpus Christi area and is classified as a 5A school by the UIL. In 2013, the school was rated "Met Standard" by the Texas Education Agency.

== Administrative ==
King's operating budget for the 2005–2006 school year was $12,151,016.00. Their attendance rate for 2003-2004 was 93.8%. As of the 2021-2022 school year, Prudence Farrell serves as the high school's Principal.

The King High School band received a 1st division at UIL in 2013 and 2014, for their shows "Every Which Way". In the 2014–2015 school year, they received a 1st division for their show "The Tribal Affect". Most recently, their show "Vertigo" also received a 1st division at UIL for the 2015–2016 school year.

== Notable alumni ==
- Iann Dior, rapper, hip hop artist. Dior attended King, but graduated from Veterans Memorial.
- Burt Hooton, pitcher for the Chicago Cubs and Los Angeles Dodgers
- Danny Lohner, musician in Nine Inch Nails
- Stan Moore, drummer and leader of Zakary Thaks
