= Todd Mooney =

American football and baseball coach (born 1965)

Current position
- Title: Athletic director
- Team: Covenant Christian Academy (Georgia)

Biographical details
- Born: June 13, 1965 (age 61); Westerville, Ohio, U.S.

Coaching career (HC unless noted)

Football
- ?: Ohio (GA)
- 1990–1994: Urbana (DC)
- 1997–1997: Oberlin (OC)
- 1999–2004: Rhodes (DB)
- 2005–2013: LaGrange
- 2014–2017: King's Ridge Christian (GA) (DC)

Baseball
- 1997: Oberlin

Administrative career (AD unless noted)
- 2005–2013: LaGrange (assistant AD)
- 2014: King's Ridge Christian (GA) (interim AD)
- 2014–2018: King's Ridge Christian (GA)
- 2018–2025: St. Pius X Catholic HS (GA)
- 2025–present: Covenant Christian Academy (Georgia)

Head coaching record
- Overall: 27–51 (football); 3–30 (baseball)
- Tournaments: Football; 0–1 (NCAA D-III playoffs)

Accomplishments and honors

Championships
- Football; 1 SLIAC (2008)

Awards
- Football; American Football Monthly NCAA D-III Coach of the Year (2008); Schutt Sports NCAA D-III Coach of the Year (2008); SLIAC Coach of the Year (2008); D3football.com South Region Coach of the Year (2008)

Todd Mooney (born June 13, 1965) is an American athletic director and former college football and baseball coach. He is the athletic director for Covenant Christian Academy (Georgia) in Cumming, a position he has held since 2025. Previously, he was the athletic director for St. Pius X Catholic High School in Atlanta, from 2018 to 2025. He was the first head football coach at LaGrange College in LaGrange, Georgia, from 2006 until midway through the 2013 season. He also coached for Ohio, Urbana, Oberlin, Rhodes, and King's Ridge Christian School.

In 2008, Mooney led LaGrange to a 9–2 record and a Saint Louis Intercollegiate Athletic Conference (SLIAC) championship after two consecutive 0–10 seasons. This single-season turnaround was the best in NCAA Division III football history.

In 1997, Mooney served as the head baseball coach for Oberlin College. In his lone season, he led the team to a 3–30 record.

== Head coaching record ==
=== Football ===
Year	Team	Overall	Conference	Standing	Bowl/playoffs
LaGrange Panthers (NCAA Division III independent) (2006–2007)
2006	LaGrange	0–10			
2007	LaGrange	0–10			
LaGrange Panthers (Saint Louis Intercollegiate Athletic Conference) (2008)
2008	LaGrange	9–2	7–0	1st	L NCAA Division III First Round
LaGrange Panthers (NCAA Division III independent) (2009–2011)
2009	LaGrange	5–5			
2010	LaGrange	3–7			
2011	LaGrange	4–6			
LaGrange Panthers (USA South Athletic Conference) (2012–2013)
2012	LaGrange	3–7	3–4	T–5th	
2013	LaGrange	3–4 (Note: Mooney served as LaGrange's head coach for the first seven games of the season before resigning. Matt Mumme replaced him for the final three games. LaGrange finished the year with an overall record of 5–5 and a mark of 5–3 in conference play, placing fifth in the USA South Athletic Conference.)	3–2		
Total:		27–51			
National championship Conference title Conference division title or championship game berth
