= Mike Major =

American football coach

Biographical details
- Education: Stephen F. Austin State University (1973)

Coaching career (HC unless noted)
- 1976: Longview HS (TX) (assistant)
- 1977–1978: Moody HS (TX) (DB)
- 1979–1981: Weatherford HS (TX) (assistant)
- 1982–1983: Austin HS (TX) (assistant)
- 1984: Dimmitt HS (TX)
- 1985: UTEP (volunteer)
- 1986–1988: Copperas Cove HS (TX) (DC)
- 1989: Iowa Wesleyan (DC)
- 1990–1991: Stephen F. Austin (RB/TE/RC)
- 1992–1993: Valdosta State (DC/LB)
- 1994: Valdosta State (DC/DB)
- 1995–1996: Valdosta State (DC/LB)
- 1997–2000: Kentucky (DC/LB)
- 2001–?: United HS (TX) (assistant)

Mike Major is an American former football coach.

Major was the defensive coordinator at the University of Kentucky from 1997 through 2000 under head coach Hal Mumme. During Major's tenure, the Wildcats played in the 1999 Outback Bowl and the 1999 Music City Bowl. Major resigned from Kentucky with one week remaining in the 2000 season; his defensive squads had allowed the most points in the Southeastern Conference in each of his last two seasons at Kentucky.

The split was painful, as Major had been noted for his close personal and professional relationship with head coach Mumme. Mumme and Major first coached together in 1977 at Foy H. Moody High School in Corpus Christi, Texas, as receivers and secondary coaches, respectively; Major would go on to work with Mumme in coaching positions at a total of six high schools and colleges. Major served as Mumme's defensive coordinator at two different schools before working for Mumme in that role for five seasons at Valdosta State University (1992–1996).

Following his departure from Kentucky, Major accepted a position as assistant coach at United High School in Laredo, Texas, in July 2001.
