= 2012 McMurry War Hawks football team =

American college football season

2012 McMurry War Hawks football
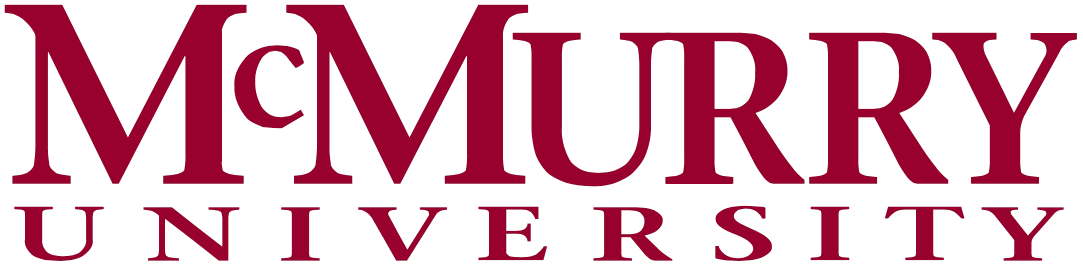

C.H.A.M.P.S. Heart of Texas Bowl champion

C.H.A.M.P.S. Heart of Texas Bowl, W 36–35 vs. Southern Arkansas
- Conference: Independent
- Record: 8–3
- Head coach: Hal Mumme (4th season)
- Offensive coordinator: Mason Miller (2nd season)
- Offensive scheme: Air raid
- Defensive coordinator: Joe Lee Dunn (4th season)
- Base defense: 3–3–5
- Home stadium: Wilford Moore Stadium

2012 NCAA Division II Super Region 4 independents football records
	Conf.			Overall
Team	W		L	W		L
McMurry *#		–		8	–	3
Oklahoma Panhandle State		–		4	–	6
NW Oklahoma State *		–		3	–	7
South Dakota Mines *		–		2	–	9
Southern Nazarene *		–		2	–	9
# – C.H.A.M.P.S. Heart of Texas Bowl participant * – Provisional NCAA Division II member

The 2012 McMurry War Hawks football team represented McMurry University in the 2012 NCAA Division II football season. The War Hawks, transitioning to Division II and Lone Star Conference (LSC) membership, competed as an independent and provisional Division II member. They played a mixed schedule of schools from the FCS, NAIA, and D-II. McMurry competed in the Division II postseason via the LSC's bid to the C.H.A.M.P.S. Heart of Texas Bowl.

The War Hawks were led by Hal Mumme in his fourth and final year as head coach. Mumme stepped down in January 2013 before being named an offensive assistant at SMU the following March.

== Schedule ==
Date	Time	Opponent	Site	Result	Attendance	Source
September 1	6:00 pm	at No. 10 Abilene Christian	Shotwell Stadium; Abilene, TX	L 0–51	11,337	
September 8	7:00 pm	at No. 22 (FCS) McNeese State	Cowboy Stadium; Lake Charles, LA	L 7–69	13,291	
September 22	6:00 pm	Wayland Baptist	Wilford Moore Stadium; Abilene, TX	W 76–13	3,019	
September 29	6:00 pm	at Oklahoma Panhandle State	Carl Wooten Field; Goodwell, OK	W 42–33	824	
October 6	4:00 pm	vs. Southern Nazarene	Gopher Warrior Bowl; Grand Prairie, TX	W 22–19	653	
October 13	7:00 pm	at Lamar	Provost Umphrey Stadium; Beaumont, TX	L 21–52	13,452	
October 20	7:00 pm	at Incarnate Word	Gayle and Tom Benson Stadium; San Antonio, TX	W 28–20	2,263	
October 27	2:00 pm	Langston^{†}	Wilford Moore Stadium; Abilene, TX	W 29–11	2,849	
November 3	2:00 pm	Texas College	Wilford Moore Stadium; Abilene, TX	W 53–0	1,553	
November 10	2:00 pm	Bacone	Wilford Moore Stadium; Abilene, TX	W 47–14	1,347	
December 1	7:00 pm	vs. Southern Arkansas	Bulldawg Stadium; Copperas Cove, TX (C.H.A.M.P.S. Heart of Texas Bowl)	W 36–35	1,124	
^{†}Homecoming; Rankings from AFCA Poll released prior to the game; All times are in Central time

== Personnel ==
2012 McMurry War Hawks football team roster
Players
Coaches
Offense

Pos.	#	Name	Class
WR	1	Greg Freeman	Sr
RB	3	Chris Simpson Jr.	So
RB	5	Paxton Grayer	Fr
RB	8	Tyreace House	Fr
WR	9	Easton McIntosh	Fr
WR	10	Jeret Smith	So
WR	14	Josh Bridges	Fr
QB	15	Jake Mullin	Sr
QB	16	Brady Lambert	Fr
QB	18	Tyler Rentfro	Fr
WR	19	Eric Shaffer	Sr
RB	20	Stehl Ratliff	Fr
WR	25	Greg Livingston	So
WR	27	Ryan Nelson	Fr
WR	28	Courte Gilbert	Sr
WR	31	Riley Lefebvre	So
WR	40	Chase Jackson	Fr
RB	46	Billy Cole III	Fr
WR	49	Josh Bridges	Fr
OL	54	Daquon Bratcher	So
OL	57	Jake Trotter	Fr
OL	58	Nolan Nasis	Fr
OL	59	Jaren Woods	Jr
OL	60	Quenten Bolden	So
OL	64	Charlie Thornton III	Fr
OL	66	Matt Barnes	Jr
OL	67	Darias Bullock	Jr
OL	69	Andrew Calloway	Jr
OL	70	Marc Tijerina	So
OL	72	Mike Goodman	Sr
OL	73	Kiefer Price	Sr
OL	75	Colton Bragg	So
OL	76	Taylor Robertson	Fr
OL	77	Rafael Gallo	So
OL	78	Art Schoonover	So
OL	79	Matt Newby	Jr
WR	81	Corey Lopez	Fr
WR	82	David McHugh	Fr
WR	84	A. J. Singleton	Fr
WR	85	Greg Freeman	Sr
WR	86	Jecori Sala	Fr
TE	87	Rod Hayes	So
WR	88	Joshua Chatman	Sr
WR	89	Kyle Consemiu	Sr

Defense

Pos.	#	Name	Class
DB	2	Cory Pippen	Jr
DB	4	MD Daniels	Sr
CB	6	D. J. Bazia	Sr
DB	7	Spencer McNeil	So
DB	12	Gregory Pinckney	So
DB	17	Desmond Guy	So
LB	21	Jonathan Blair	So
DB	22	Ryan Williams	Fr
DB	23	Brett Mahnke	Fr
DB	24	George Adams	So
DB	26	Decorian Johnson	Fr
LB	29	Jeff Arnold	So
LB	30	Niko Alana	Fr
DB	32	John Keith Jr.	Jr
DB	34	Will Galloway	Fr
LB	35	Numi Lolohea	Sr
LB	36	Scott Roberson	Fr
DB	37	Jacob Owen	Sr
DB	38	Clinton McCoy	So
DB	39	Damian Dixon	Fr
LB	41	Matt DaPra	Jr
DB	42	Willie Daniels	So
DB	43	Chase Franklin	Fr
DL	44	Fletcher Jones	So
LB	48	Josh Jones	So
DL	50	Demonte Byrd	Fr
LB	55	Malique Cage	So
LB	56	Chris Horton	So
DL	90	Garrison Railsback	Fr
DT	91	Markell Rice	Jr
DL	92	Calvin Middlebrooks	Fr
DL	93	Corey Hall	Sr
DL	94	Andrew Sanchez	So
DL	96	Randall O'Bryant	Fr
DL	98	Jaylen Hill	Fr

Special teams

Pos.	#	Name	Class
K	11	Cory Foust	Sr
K	80	Josh King	Fr
P	95	John Kowalski	Sr

Head coach

- Hal Mumme

Coordinators/assistant coaches

- Kendall Roberson
  Assistant head coach/defensive backs
- Mason Miller
  Offensive coordinator/offensive line
- Joe Lee Dunn
  Defensive coordinator
- Chase Holbrook
  Quarterbacks
- Evan Burk
  Wide receivers
- Scott Highsmith
  Running backs
- Josh Creech
  Linebackers
- Bobby Blizzard
  Receivers
- Earl Cochran
  Defensive line
- Chet Foraker
  Assistant running backs

Legend

- (C) Team captain
- (S) Suspended
- (I) Ineligible
- Injured
- Redshirt

Roster
Last update: October 20, 2024

== Game summaries ==
=== At No. 10 Abilene Christian ===
	1	2	3	4	Total
War Hawks	0	0	0	0	0
No. 10 Wildcats	0	21	23	7	51

Statistics	MCM	ACU
First downs	21	27
Total yards	301	461
Rushing yards	12	165
Passing yards	289	296
Turnovers	2	1
Time of possession	29:48	30:12

Team	Category	Player	Statistics
McMurry	Passing	Jake Mullin	37/59, 288 yards, INT
McMurry	Rushing	Chris Simpson	8 rushes, 35 yards
McMurry	Receiving	Greg Livingston	5 receptions, 79 yards
Abilene Christian	Passing	Mitchell Gale	19/28, 290 yards, TD, INT
Abilene Christian	Rushing	Marcel Threat	14 rushes, 88 yards, 2 TD
Abilene Christian	Receiving	Taylor Gabriel	7 receptions, 108 yards, TD

=== At No. 22 (FCS) McNeese State ===
	1	2	3	4	Total
Wat Hawks	0	0	7	0	7
No. 22 (FCS) Cowboys	21	24	14	10	69

Statistics	MCM	MCN
First downs	14	25
Total yards	246	484
Rushing yards	-3	282
Passing yards	249	202
Turnovers	4	1
Time of possession	22:57	37:03

Team	Category	Player	Statistics
McMurry	Passing	Jake Mullin	22/36, 171 yards, 3 INT
McMurry	Rushing	Billy Cole III	2 rushes, 16 yards
McMurry	Receiving	Paxton Grayer	6 receptions, 60 yards
McNeese	Passing	Cody Stroud	6/10, 98 yards, 2 TD, INT
McNeese	Rushing	Terrell Alfred	12 rushes, 75 yards
McNeese	Receiving	Darius Carey	4 receptions, 90 yards, 2 TD

=== Wayland Baptist ===
	1	2	3	4	Total
Pioneers	0	7	6	0	13
War Hawks	21	21	20	14	76

Statistics	WBU	MCM
First downs	21	36
Total yards	271	792
Rushing yards	63	195
Passing yards	208	597
Turnovers	4	3
Time of possession	29:15	30:45

Team	Category	Player	Statistics
Wayland Baptist	Passing	Luis Gonzalez	14/26, 137 yards, INT
Wayland Baptist	Rushing	Kendall Roberson	17 rushes, 81 yards, TD
Wayland Baptist	Receiving	Trent Schuett	4 receptions, 77 yards
McMurry	Passing	Jake Mullin	32/41, 403 yards, 4 TD
McMurry	Rushing	Paxton Grayer	12 rushes, 119 yards, TD
McMurry	Receiving	Clinton McCoy	6 receptions, 90 yards, TD

=== At Oklahoma Panhandle State ===
	1	2	3	4	Total
War Hawks	14	14	7	7	42
Aggies	3	3	15	12	33

Statistics	MCM	OPSU
First downs	23	26
Total yards	422	467
Rushing yards	-18	207
Passing yards	440	260
Turnovers	0	0
Time of possession	25:36	36:14

Team	Category	Player	Statistics
McMurry	Passing	Jake Mullin	34/45, 440 yards, 5 TD
McMurry	Rushing	Paxton Grayer	9 rushes, 15 yards, TD
McMurry	Receiving	Eric Shaffer	6 receptions, 133 yards
Oklahoma Panhandle State	Passing	Caleb Holbrook	16/31, 260 yards, 2 TD
Oklahoma Panhandle State	Rushing	Justice Patterson	14 rushes, 85 yards
Oklahoma Panhandle State	Receiving	Daniel Wise	5 receptions, 70 yards

=== Vs. Southern Nazarene ===
	1	2	3	4	Total
Crimson Storm	3	7	0	9	19
War Hawks	7	0	7	8	22

Statistics	SNU	MCM
First downs	23	19
Total yards	453	364
Rushing yards	179	116
Passing yards	274	248
Turnovers	3	3
Time of possession	33:51	25:19

Team	Category	Player	Statistics
Southern Nazarene	Passing	Dylan Terry	25/50, 274 yards, 2 TD, 2 INT
Southern Nazarene	Rushing	Derrick Perkins	25 rushes, 73 yards
Southern Nazarene	Receiving	Sedrick Johnson	9 receptions, 151 yards, 2 TD
McMurry	Passing	Jake Mullin	26/40, 248 yards, INT
McMurry	Rushing	Paxton Grayer	18 rushes, 158 yards, 3 TD
McMurry	Receiving	Greg Livingston	7 receptions, 80 yards

=== At Lamar ===
	1	2	3	4	Total
War Hawks	3	0	3	15	21
Cardinals	10	21	14	7	52

Statistics	MCM	LU
First downs	22	21
Total yards	369	380
Rushing yards	52	275
Passing yards	317	105
Turnovers	2	3
Time of possession	35:51	24:09

Team	Category	Player	Statistics
McMurry	Passing	Jake Mullin	21/41, 187 yards, INT
McMurry	Rushing	Paxton Grayer	13 rushes, 39 yards
McMurry	Receiving	Greg Livingston	8 receptions, 97 yards
Lamar	Passing	Caleb Berry	8/18, 195 yards, 3 TD, INT
Lamar	Rushing	DePaul Garrett	10 rushes, 104 yards, TD
Lamar	Receiving	Kevin Johnson	5 receptions, 77 yards, 3 TD

=== At Incarnate Word ===
	1	2	3	4	Total
War Hawks	0	16	12	0	28
Cardinals	10	0	0	10	20

Statistics	MCM	UIW
First downs	30	18
Total yards	427	296
Rushing yards	105	140
Passing yards	322	156
Turnovers	1	1
Time of possession	33:08	26:52

Team	Category	Player	Statistics
McMurry	Passing	Jake Mullin	45/61, 322 yards, 2 TD, INT
McMurry	Rushing	Paxton Grayer	13 rushes, 53 yards, TD
McMurry	Receiving	Greg Livingston	13 receptions, 134 yards
Incarnate Word	Passing	Taylor Woods	22/32, 156 yards, TD
Incarnate Word	Rushing	Joseph Sadler	7 rushes, 64 yards
Incarnate Word	Receiving	Andrew Mocio	6 receptions, 43 yards

=== Langston ===
	1	2	3	4	Total
Lions	3	0	8	0	11
War Hawks	0	22	0	7	29

Statistics	LANG	MCM
First downs	18	18
Total yards	376	283
Rushing yards	121	115
Passing yards	255	168
Turnovers	3	2
Time of possession	33:15	26:45

Team	Category	Player	Statistics
Langston	Passing	Brend Crawford	10/20, 154 yards
Langston	Rushing	Tre Stewart	14 rushes, 59 yards
Langston	Receiving	Shel Augustine	4 receptions, 85 yards
McMurry	Passing	Jake Mullin	19/33, 168 yards, 3 TD, 2 INT
McMurry	Rushing	Greg Livingston	3 rushes, 49 yards
McMurry	Receiving	Greg Livingston	7 receptions, 122 yards, TD

=== Texas College ===
	1	2	3	4	Total
Steers	0	0	0	0	0
War Hawks	20	13	13	7	53

Statistics	TC	MCM
First downs	7	33
Total yards	153	664
Rushing yards	35	34
Passing yards	118	630
Turnovers	4	2
Time of possession	24:00	36:00

Team	Category	Player	Statistics
Texas College	Passing	Milton Harper	10/23, 118 yards, INT
Texas College	Rushing	Marcus Thompson	4 rushes, 42 yards
Texas College	Receiving	Ja'Marius Allen	3 receptions, 45 yards
McMurry	Passing	Jake Mullin	49/63, 471 yards, 7 TD
McMurry	Rushing	Paxton Grayer	10 rushes, 44 yards
McMurry	Receiving	Jeret Smith	7 receptions, 148 yards, 3 TD

=== Bacone ===
	1	2	3	4	Total
Warriors	7	0	0	7	14
War Hawks	21	13	6	7	47

Statistics	BC	MCM
First downs	19	19
Total yards	325	387
Rushing yards	196	85
Passing yards	129	302
Turnovers	5	0
Time of possession	34:35	25:25

Team	Category	Player	Statistics
Bacone	Passing	Ryan Morrow	9/22, 103 yards, TD, INT
Bacone	Rushing	Tyler Thomas	20 rushes, 118 yards, TD
Bacone	Receiving	Chris McCall	3 receptions, 57 yards
McMurry	Passing	Jake Mullin	31/43, 302 yards, TD
McMurry	Rushing	Chris Simpson	15 rushes, 104 yards, 2 TD
McMurry	Receiving	Greg Livingston	11 receptions, 111 yards

=== Vs. Southern Arkansas (C.H.A.M.P.S. Heart of Texas Bowl) ===
	1	2	3	4	Total
Muleriders	14	0	14	7	35
War Hawks	0	7	14	15	36

Statistics	SAU	MCM
First downs	32	29
Total yards	618	470
Rushing yards	306	22
Passing yards	312	448
Turnovers	3	2
Time of possession	33:24	26:36

Team	Category	Player	Statistics
Southern Arkansas	Passing	Tyler Sykora	24/42, 312 yards, TD, 2 INT
Southern Arkansas	Rushing	Mark Johnson	30 rushes, 264 yards, 3 TD
Southern Arkansas	Receiving	Jack Brown	7 receptions, 128 yards, TD
McMurry	Passing	Jake Mullin	46/66, 448 yards, 3 TD, 2 INT
McMurry	Rushing	Jake Mullin	5 rushes, 16 yards, TD
McMurry	Receiving	Clinton McCoy	12 receptions, 162 yards, TD
