= Anthony Bright =

American gridiron football player (born 1977)

No. 81, 82
- Position: Wide receiver

Personal information
- Born: March 28, 1977 (age 49); Gainesville, Florida, U.S.
- Listed height: 6 ft 1 in (1.85 m)
- Listed weight: 176 lb (80 kg)

Career information
- High school: Bradford (Starke, Florida)
- College: Valencia CC
- NFL draft: 1999: undrafted

Career history
- Houston Marshals (2000); Jacksonville Tomcats (2000–2002); Carolina Panthers (2001–2002); Houston Texans (2003)*; Scottish Claymores (2003); Orlando Predators (2004); Orlando Predators (2005)*; Las Vegas Gladiators (2005)*; Grand Rapids Rampage (2005)*; Philadelphia Soul (2006); Calgary Stampeders (2006)
- * Offseason or practice squad member only

Career NFL statistics
- Games played: 1
- Stats at Pro Football Reference

Career AFL statistics
- Receptions: 16
- Receiving yards: 241
- Receiving TDs: 2
- Returns: 19
- Return yards: 273
- Stats at ArenaFan.com

Anthony Leonard Bright (born March 28, 1977) is an American former professional football player who was a wide receiver for the Carolina Panthers of the National Football League (NFL). He also played for the Scottish Claymores of NFL Europe, the Orlando Predators and Philadelphia Soul of the Arena Football League (AFL), and the Jacksonville Tomcats of the af2. Bright played college basketball at Valencia Community College. In 2002, he was notably attacked by Panthers teammate Steve Smith during a film session. In 2004, Bright sued the Panthers for damages.
