= 1994 North Alabama Lions football team =

American college football season

1994 North Alabama Lions football

NCAA Division II champion GSC champion

NCAA Division II Championship Game, W 41–34 vs. Texas A&M–Kingsville
- Conference: Gulf South Conference
- Record: 13–1 (7–0 GSC)
- Head coach: Bobby Wallace (7th season)
- Offensive coordinator: Willie J. Slater (3rd season)
- Defensive coordinator: Bill Hyde (14th season)
- Home stadium: Braly Municipal Stadium

1994 Gulf South Conference football standings
	Conf.					Overall
Team	W		L		T	W		L		T
No. 1 North Alabama $^	7	–	0	–	0	13	–	1	–	0
No. 6 Valdosta State ^	6	–	1	–	0	11	–	2	–	0
Central Arkansas	6	–	1	–	0	8	–	2	–	0
No. 10 West Georgia	4	–	3	–	0	7	–	3	–	0
Delta State	2	–	4	–	1	3	–	5	–	2
Henderson State	1	–	5	–	1	2	–	8	–	1
Livingston	0	–	7	–	0	1	–	9	–	0
Mississippi College *	2	–	5	–	0	4	–	5	–	1
$ – Conference champion; ^ – NCAA Division II playoff participant; * – ineligible for conference championship; Rankings from NCAA Division II Football Committee poll

The 1994 North Alabama Lions football team represented the University of North Alabama during the 1994 NCAA Division II football season, and completed the 62nd season of Lions football. The Lions played their home games at Braly Municipal Stadium in Florence Alabama. The team was led by coach Bobby Wallace. The team finished the regular season with a 9–1 record and made the NCAA Division II playoffs. The Lions defeated the Texas A&M–Kingsville Javelinas 16–10 in the National Championship Game en route to the program's second consecutive NCAA Division II Football Championship.

== Schedule ==
Date	Opponent	Rank	Site	Result	Attendance	Source
September 3	vs. Fort Valley State*	No. 1	Henderson Stadium; Macon, GA (Shriner's Classic)	W 35–0	6,200	
September 10	Alabama A&M*	No. 1	Braly Municipal Stadium; Florence, AL	W 58–13	14,217	
September 17	Mississippi College	No. 1	Braly Municipal Stadium; Florence, AL	W 24–0	7,438	
September 24	at Delta State	No. 1	Travis E. Parker Field; Cleveland, MS	W 38–0	4,714	
October 8	at No. 3 (I-AA) Youngstown State*	No. 1	Stambaugh Stadium; Youngstown, OH	L 14–17	17,411	
October 15	at Henderson State	No. 1	Carpenter–Haygood Stadium; Arkadelphia, AR	W 41–7	1,435	
October 22	Central Arkansas	No. 1	Braly Municipal Stadium; Florence, AL	W 28–21	10,614	
October 29	at Livingston	No. 1	Tiger Stadium; Livingston, AL (rivalry)	W 50–7	5,012	
November 5	No. 2 Valdosta State	No. 1	Braly Municipal Stadium; Florence, AL	W 38–21	9,113	
November 12	at No. 10 West Georgia	No. 1	Grisham Stadium; Carrollton, GA	W 37–25	6,025	
November 19	No. 16 Carson–Newman*	No. 1	Braly Municipal Stadium; Florence, AL (NCAA Division II First Round)	W 17–13		
November 26	No. 6 Valdosta State*	No. 1	Braly Municipal Stadium; Florence, AL (NCAA Division II Quarterfinal)	W 27–24 ^{2OT}	7,039	
December 3	No. 15 North Dakota*	No. 1	Braly Municipal Stadium; Florence, AL (NCAA Division II Semifinal)	W 35–7	5,694	
December 10	No. 2 Texas A&M–Kingsville*	No. 1	Braly Municipal Stadium; Florence, AL (NCAA Division II Championship)	W 16–10	13,526	
*Non-conference game; Rankings from NCAA Division II Football Committee Poll released prior to the game; Source:
