= Louis Nix =

American football player (1991–2021)

Louis Nix III
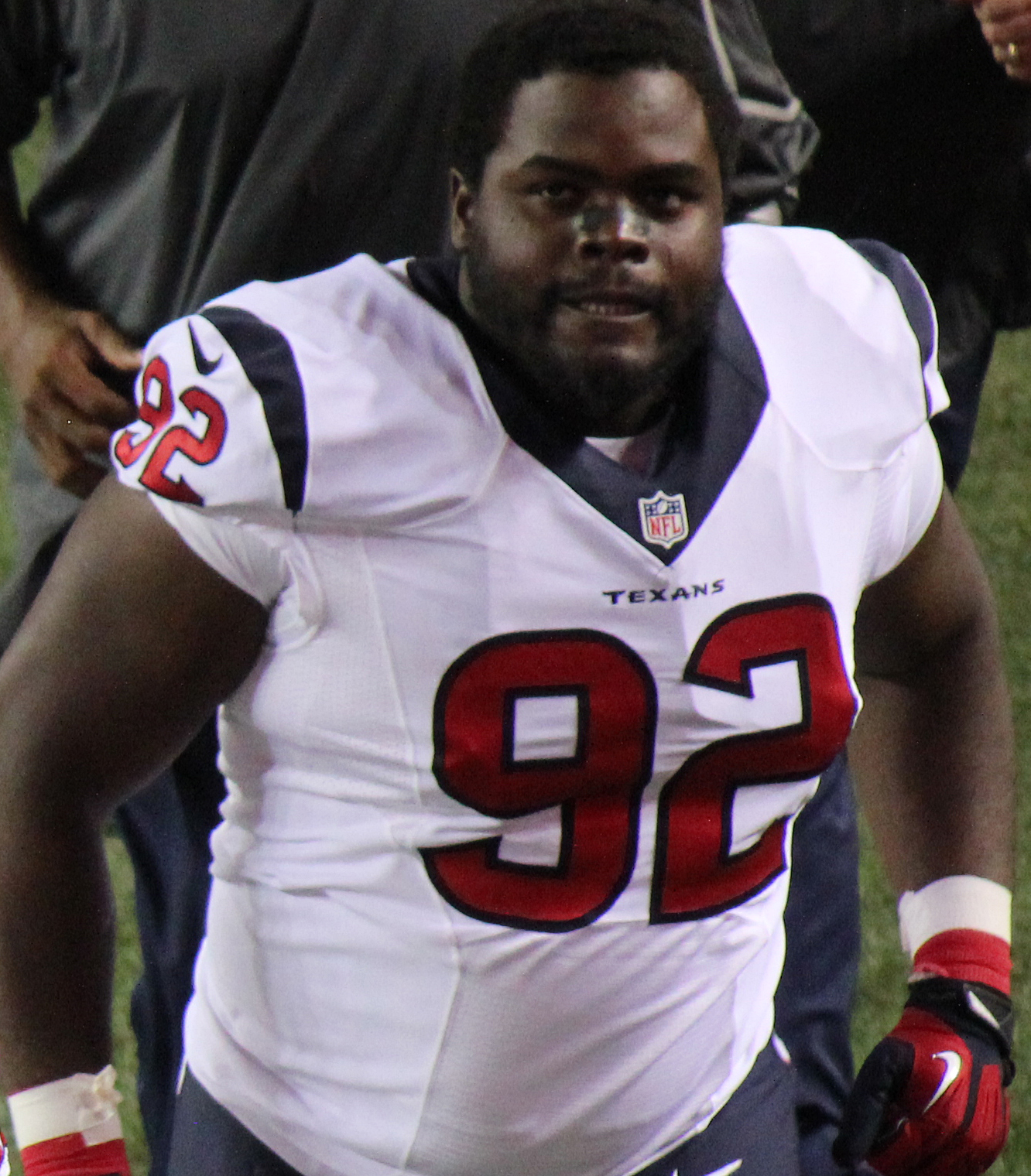
- Nix with the Houston Texans in 2014

No. 74, 92, 97
- Position: Defensive tackle

Personal information
- Born: July 31, 1991; Jacksonville, Florida, U.S.
- Died: February 27, 2021 (aged 29); Jacksonville, Florida, U.S.
- Listed height: 6 ft 2 in (1.88 m)
- Listed weight: 331 lb (150 kg)

Career information
- High school: William M. Raines (Jacksonville, Florida)
- College: Notre Dame
- NFL draft: 2014: 3rd round, 83rd overall pick

Career history
- Houston Texans (2014); New York Giants (2015); Washington Redskins (2016)*; Jacksonville Jaguars (2016–2017)*
- * Offseason or practice squad member only

Career NFL statistics
- Games played: 4
- Stats at Pro Football Reference

Louis Anthony Nix III (July 31, 1991 – February 27, 2021) was an American professional football defensive tackle in the National Football League (NFL). He played college football for the Notre Dame Fighting Irish. Nix was selected by the Houston Texans in the third round of the 2014 NFL draft.

== Early life ==
A native of Jacksonville, Florida, Nix attended William M. Raines High School, where he played football, basketball and competed in track & field. In high school football, he was an All-State defensive lineman. He recorded 50 tackles and 10 sacks as senior in 2009, and was named an all-First Coast pick as defensive lineman by the Florida Times-Union of Jacksonville. He tallied 19 combined sacks as a sophomore and junior in 2007 and 2008 helped Raines High School to 7–4 record and appearance in Florida state playoffs as sophomore in 2007. He also played basketball at William Raines. He was selected to play in the 2010 Under Armour All-America Game in St. Petersburg, Florida.

Regarded as a four-star recruit by Rivals.com, Nix was ranked as the No. 7 defensive tackle of his class. He accepted a scholarship offer from Notre Dame over offers from Miami (FL), Florida State and Florida.

== College career ==
After not playing as a freshman in 2010, Nix started 11 games as a sophomore in 2011, recording 45 tackles. In 2012, Nix started 11 out of 13 games, recording 50 tackles, including seven and a half for a loss, and two sacks. On December 17, 2012, Nix announced that he would resume his college tenure for his senior season.

In 2013, Nix started the first 7 games of the season, before sitting out games against the Air Force and Navy as he was dealing with knee tendonitis. He returned the following week in a game against Pittsburgh. On November 21, 2013, after having arthroscopic surgery to repair a torn meniscus in his knee, it was announced that he would miss the remainder of the season plus the bowl game. He finished his senior season with 27 tackles, including two for loss.

== Professional career ==
On December 6, 2013, Nix signed with agents Todd France and Brian Ayrault.

Pre-draft measurables
Height	Weight	Arm length	Hand span	40-yard dash	10-yard split	20-yard split	20-yard shuttle	Three-cone drill	Vertical jump	Broad jump	Bench press
6 ft 2 3/8 in (1.89 m)	331 lb (150 kg)	33 in (0.84 m)	9 7/8 in (0.25 m)	5.38 s	1.87 s	3.07 s	4.94 s	8.01 s	25 1/2 in (0.65 m)	8 ft 1 in (2.46 m)	24 reps
All values from NFL Combine except 40-yard dash, bench press and 3-cone drill from Pro Day

Nix was selected by the Houston Texans in the third round (83rd overall) of the 2014 NFL draft. On May 16, 2014, he was signed to a $2.85-million contract by the Texans, including a signing bonus of $575,252. Nix underwent a second knee surgery during the off-season and missed workouts as well as most of training camp. His rookie season prematurely ended after he underwent a third knee surgery on September 24, 2014. He was unable to play any games during his time with Houston. Nix was released by the Texans on September 4, 2015.

On September 6, 2015, Nix was claimed off waivers by the New York Giants. On September 8, 2015, he failed his physical and was waived. On September 9, 2015, Nix was re-signed by the Giants. He was waived again on November 7, 2015. On November 10, 2015, he was re-signed to the Giants' practice squad. On January 6, 2016, Nix signed a reserve/future contract with the Giants. On September 3, 2016, he was released by the Giants.

The Washington Redskins signed Nix to their practice squad on September 5, 2016. On September 19, 2016, he was released from the practice squad.

Nix was signed to the Jacksonville Jaguars practice squad on October 25, 2016. He signed a reserve/future contract with the Jaguars on January 4, 2017. On May 15, 2017, he was released by the Jaguars.

== Personal life ==
Nix called himself "Irish Chocolate."

On December 8, 2020, Nix was shot during an armed robbery at a Jacksonville gas station while he was putting air in his car tires. He survived the incident.

== Death ==
Nix was reported missing on February 24, 2021. His car was found in a pond near his apartment in Jacksonville, and he was subsequently found dead on February 27, three days after being reported missing. The cause of death subsequently ruled to be drowning by the medical examiner. Alcohol was found in his system.

== See also ==
- List of solved missing person cases (2020s)
