= Corpus Christi Independent School District =

School district in Texas, United States

Address
- 801 Leopard Street Corpus Christi, Texas, 78401; United States
- Coordinates: 27°47′46″N 97°23′56″W

District information
- Type: Unified school district
- Motto: Developing Hearts and Minds
- Grades: PK–12
- Superintendent: Dr. Roland Hernandez
- School board: 7 members
- Chair of the board: Eric Villarreal
- Schools: 54
- Budget: $450,865,000
- NCES District ID: 4815270

Students and staff
- Students: 33,053
- Teachers: 2,101.36 (on an FTE basis)
- Staff: 4,617.07 (on an FTE basis)
- Student–teacher ratio: 15.73

Other information
- Website: ccisd.us

Corpus Christi Independent School District (CCISD) is a school district based in Corpus Christi, Texas, United States.

Corpus Christi Independent School District is part of Education Service Center Region 2.

The district serves a diverse student population in the Corpus Christi area and includes multiple elementary, middle, and high schools. It plays an important role in the community by providing education, extracurricular activities, and support services to students.

There are five other school districts that also serve the city of Corpus Christi. CCISD serves most of the city of Corpus Christi.

In 2009, the school district was rated "academically acceptable" by the Texas Education Agency.

The Superintendent of Schools is Dr. Roland Hernandez (2014-present).

== History ==
In 1970, the United States Supreme Court ruled in the decision Cisneros v. Corpus Christi Independent School District that Latino students should be given the same protection as African-American students under the Brown v. Board of Education decision.

== Programs ==
Corpus Christi Independent School District offers a variety of programs for students, including athletics, fine arts, and academic support programs. These programs help students prepare for college and future careers.

== Statistics ==
The Corpus Christi Independent School District displays a diverse student community across all campuses with the student demographics being displayed as follows. 81.6% Hispanic/Latino, 11.4% White, 3.2% Black or African American, 2.1% Asian or Asian Pacific Islander, 1.5% Two or more races, 0.1% American Indian or Alaska Native, and 0.1% Native Hawaiian or Other Pacific Islander.

== Schools ==
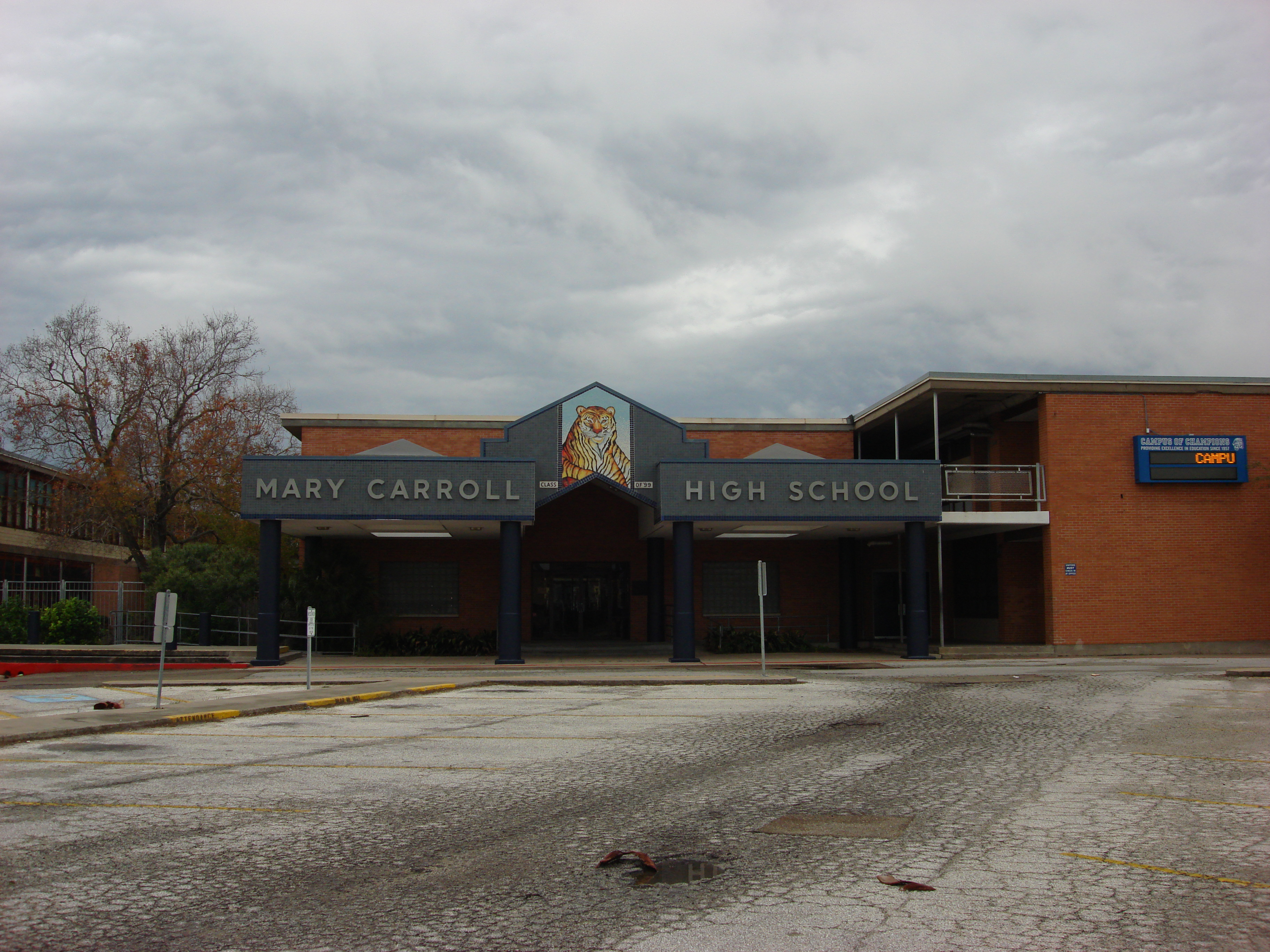
Picture of Mary Caroll High School before it was fully demolished in January 2026.

=== High schools ===
- Mary Carroll High School
- Richard King High School
- Roy Miller High School
- Foy H. Moody High School
- W. B. Ray High School
- Veterans Memorial High School
- Collegiate High School
- Solomon Coles High School & Education Center
- Harold T. Branch Academy for Career and Technical Education

=== Middle schools ===
- Dorothy Adkins Middle School
- Marvin P. Baker Middle School
- Tom Browne Middle School
- Cullen Place Middle School
- Cunningham at South Park Middle School
- Robert Driscoll Middle
- Paul R. Haas Middle School
- Carl O. Hamlin Middle School
- Harold C. Kaffie Middle School
- Lexington Middle School
- Sterling B. Martin Middle School
- Metropolitan Preparatory School of Design
- Elliott Grant Middle School

=== Elementary schools ===
- Allen Elementary School
- Barnes Elementary School
- Berlanga Elementary School
- Calk-Wilson Elementary School
- Club Estates Elementary School
- Creekside Elementary School
- Crockett Elementary School
- Dawson Elementary School
- Early Childhood Development Center
- Evans Elementary School
- Fannin Elementary School
- Galvan Elementary School
- Garcia Elementary School
- Gibson Elementary School
- Hicks Elementary School
- Houston Elementary School
- Jones Elementary School
- Kolda Elementary School
- Kostoryz Elementary School
  - It was formerly in its own school district, which began operations in 1907. The school was named after a Czech American settlement created by S. L. Kostoryz. In 1950 it had 89 students. The Corpus Christi Times described the school as having an "unhurried "country school" calm."
- Los Encinos SES Elementary School
- Meadowbrook Elementary School
- Menger Elementary School
- Metropolitan Elementary School of Design
- Mireles Elementary School
- Montclair Elementary School
- Moore Elementary School
- Oak Park Elementary School
- Sanders Elementary School
- Schanen Estates Elementary School
- Shaw Elementary School
- Smith Elementary School
- Travis Elementary School
- Webb Elementary School
- Windsor Park Elementary School
- Woodlawn Elementary School
- Yeager Elementary School
- Zavala Elementary School

=== Other ===
- Student Learning & Guidance Center
- Mary Grett School
- Adult Learning Center
