= Micah Ross =

American football player (born 1976)

No. 86, 80, 11
- Position: Wide receiver

Personal information
- Born: January 13, 1976 (age 50); Jacksonville, Florida, U.S.
- Listed height: 6 ft 2 in (1.88 m)
- Listed weight: 219 lb (99 kg)

Career information
- High school: Andrew Jackson (Jacksonville, Florida)
- College: Jacksonville
- NFL draft: 1999: undrafted

Career history
- Jacksonville Tomcats (2000); Jacksonville Jaguars (2001–2003); San Diego Chargers (2003–2004); Carolina Panthers (2004)
- Stats at Pro Football Reference

Micah David Ross (born January 13, 1976) is an American former professional football wide receiver. He played professionally in the National Football League (NFL) with the Jacksonville Jaguars, the San Diego Chargers, and the Carolina Panthers. In 2001, he signed as an undrafted rookie free agent with the Jaguars. He played college basketball and college football at Jacksonville University.

== Early life and college ==
Ross attended Andrew Jackson High School in Jacksonville, Florida. He attended Jacksonville University, where he played at forward for Jacksonville Dolphins men's basketball from 1994 to 1998 under head coaches George Scholz, Buster Harvey, and Hugh Durham, averaging 9.9 points and 5.8 rebounds in 110 games. After his basketball eligibility ended, Ross played one season at wide receiver for Jacksonville Dolphins football in 1998, where he played in 10 games with 17 receptions for 255 yards and two touchdowns.

== Professional playing career ==
=== Jacksonville Barracudas ===
In 1998, after his college basketball days had ended, he played one season with the Jacksonville Barracudas of the United States Basketball League, while playing for JU's football team and teaching.

=== Jacksonville Tomcats ===
Ross played wide receiver and linebacker for the Jacksonville Tomcats of the AF2 in 2000.

=== Jacksonville Jaguars ===
Ross signed with the Jacksonville Jaguars as a free agent on August 17, 2001 but was waived 11 days later. On October 31, he signed with the Jaguars' practice squad. On December 8, he was promoted to the active roster. He made his NFL debut the next day with two kick returns for 35 yards in a 14–10 win at the Cincinnati Bengals. In five games in 2001, playing mostly as a gunner and kick returner, Ross had eight kick returns for 150 yards and one tackle.

In 2002, Ross played in all 16 games off the bench with 10 tackles and a fumble recovery. On November 17, Ross recovered a muffed punt; the recovery set up a touchdown drive in a 24–21 win at the Houston Texans.

Ross did not play any games for the Jaguars in 2003 before being waived on October 3.

=== San Diego Chargers ===
On November 5, 2003, Ross signed as an unrestricted free agent with the San Diego Chargers. He played in six games with two tackles. After playing in seven games, he was released on October 26, 2004.

=== Carolina Panthers ===
On October 28, 2004, Ross was signed by the Carolina Panthers. He played in 10 games with two tackles. He was released on September 1, 2005, after being placed on injured reserve on August 30.

== Coaching and teaching career ==
After graduating from Jacksonville University, Ross was a teacher for one year, while playing for the Jacksonville Dolphins football team. In 2010, he was hired to teach history and coach football, basketball, and track at Atlantic Coast High School in Jacksonville.
