= Cisneros v. CCISD =

Court case about discrimination against Mexican Americans

Cisneros v. Corpus Christi Independent School District (CCISD) was a 1970 federal court case in the Southern District of Texas. The court case revealed the segregation of Mexican American students and policies that considered them as "white" in order to prevent them from moving to the previously segregated white schools. The court case further showcased the discriminatory educational practices they faced after the ruling of Brown v. Board of Education. The case concluded by determining that Mexican Americans were an "identifiable ethnic-minority group," and deemed them a separate race from white. Moreover, it reinforced the desegregation of CCISD.

== Background ==
In 1954, a related case that dealt with racial discrimination in a school setting, Brown v. Board of Education, stated that any segregation in the public school system was unconstitutional. The Civil Rights Act of 1964 forbade discrimination based on race, sex, religion, and national origin. Though these laws were established, discriminatory practices were still occurring in the school system and the Corpus Christi Independent School District.

“Cisneros v. Corpus Christi ISD” was one of the first to use the Brown v. Board of Education case to Mexicans. For a bit, schools in Texas would say Mexican students were white so that they wouldn't get in trouble for people thinking they are segregating but they also kept them away from Anglo students. They said that black and Mexican students were being segregated on purpose and said the district had to work with officials to bring the schools together. This finally happened around 1975, James-Gallaway did some research and found out that the case also shows problems between Mexican and Black efforts to desegregate.

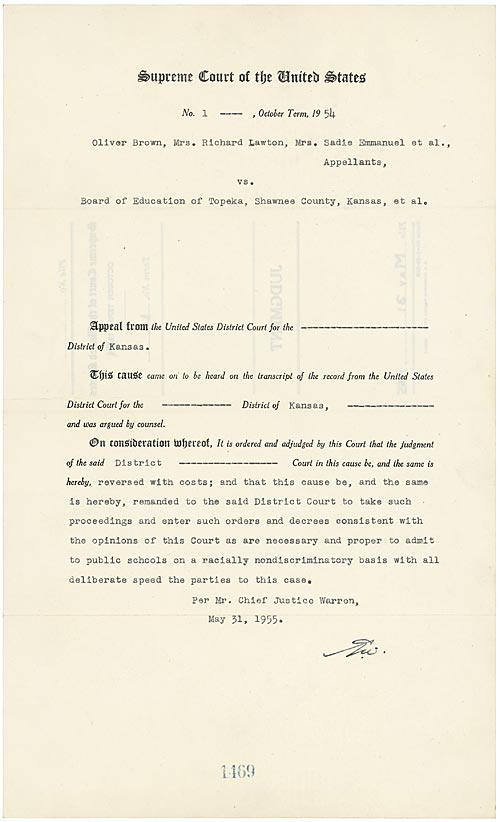
Results of Brown vs Board 1954

Following the ruling of Brown v. Board of Education, the State Board of Education enacted the policy that segregation between African Americans and Anglo students was unconstitutional in 1955. It further expanded on this, stating that "the separation of children of Latin American descent in the public schools is contrary to law".

Despite the ruling of Brown v. Board of Education and the policy enacted by the State Board of Education, CCISD decided to overlook this issue. In 1956, the "Freedom of Choice" plan was enacted by CCISD. The purpose of this plan was to assist the schools in the United States with a system for natural desegregation by giving students the choice to select where they will attend school instead of students being assigned to them based on geographic basis. However, this plan prevented Mexican American students from enrolling in formerly all-white schools. CCISD argued that since Mexican Americans were deemed "white," Mexican Americans were already enrolled in a "white" school. This led to the different schools having varied sanitary conditions and facilities.

== District Court Case ==
In 1966, the children of Jose Cisneros complained to their father about the run-down nature and poor sanitary conditions of their Corpus Christi, Texas school. The school they were attending was a formerly all-black school and had neglected the sanitary care provided to wealthier schools. For two years, Cisneros attempted to persuade the school board to take action to fix the deprived schools across Corpus Christi but was unsuccessful. This led Cisneros to seek aid from the Civil Rights Commissioner Héctor P. García. The local Corpus Christi chapter of the United Steel Workers of America Union provided legal aid and assistance to the twenty-three families who were the plaintiffs. Through an investigation of school lines and the separating of students from different social classes, it was revealed that CCISD violated the 14th Amendment and the Civil Rights Act. In 1968, Cisneros and other concerned parents hired lawyer James De Anda and filed a lawsuit against CCISD for their acts of segregation and discrimination against Mexican American students.

The court hearings began in May 1970. Cisneros testified that Mexican Americans are an identifiable minority that suffered discrimination and segregation and deserve the same protection as African Americans under the rights of the Brown v. Board of Education case. Corpus Christi Independent School District was found guilty of de jure segregation, separation of race enforced by the law, and intentionally maintained a "dual school system," where lower class students were treated differently than higher class students. CCISD's actions in question included "drawing school boundaries, locating schools, assigning teachers, and controlling transfer systems in ways that ensured that Mexican Americans attended segregated schools,". The ruling of Brown v. Board of Education applied to Cisneros v. CCISD due to the segregation and discrimination that the school district was acting against Mexican American students.

The seated judge for the case, District Court Judge Woodrow Seals, stated that he was investigating five issues as determined by the case:

1. Does Brown versus the Board of Education apply to Mexican Americans?
2. If Brown applies to Mexican Americans, does it apply in the instant case?
3. Is CCISD a dual (segregated) or unitary school system?
4. If CCISD is a dual system, is the segregation de jure or de facto on a basis?
5. If CCISD is a dual system, how can a unitary system be established and maintained?".

In the court case, CCISD argued that Brown v. Board of Education did not apply to Mexican Americans because they had not been segregated and were already in white schools. Furthermore, they argued that the diversity of teachers had increased by showcasing data that stated "the number of Anglo teachers increased by 146% and Mexican American teachers rose 589%". However, they omitted that the percentage of Anglo and Mexican American teachers compared to Anglo teachers was actually very minimal, with "Mexican American teachers comprised 0.05% of the total faculty in 1955 and only 17.85% in 1970."

Moreover, De Anda argued that Mexican Americans were indeed being segregated and CCISD was attempting to prevent desegregation by implementing the "Freedom of Choice" plan. Héctor P. García then testified that Mexican Americans have historically been discriminated against in society and school, especially in the Corpus Christi area. June 3, 1970, marked the day that Judge Seals declared that "Mexican American students are an identifiable, ethnic minority class sufficient to bring them within the protection of Brown v. Board of Education". The next day, June 4, 1970, Judge Seals stated that the school district was ordered to implement a new desegregation plan which would be put into effect for the 1971-1972 school years.

== Federal Court Case ==
CCISD repeatedly appealed the district court's decision, including to the United States Supreme Court, but the ruling was upheld by the Court of Appeals for the Fifth Circuit on August 2, 1972. Judge David Dyer wrote in the opinion of the court that segregation is unconstitutional, regardless if it is de facto or de jure. Noting that this case is "a novel school desegregation ease" as the separation of Mexican Americans from Whites "never had a statutory origin," meaning it was de facto segregation. Dyer notes that Corpus Christi’s schools were had "inevitable segregation," as Mexican American and Black students concentrated in certain schools because of residential patterns and the district’s strict “neighborhood school zones” zoning.

The Appeals Court agreed that CCISD had to desegregate but ruled that the District Court’s remedy relied too heavily on widespread busing, with the Appeals Court's remedy making a key point to minimize transportation burdens. The opinion instructed the District Court to desegregate CCISD schools by having school officials create a "student assignment plan." In the event officials were unable or unwilling to the district court was instructed to act immediately. The opinion also states that a plan assigning students to schools "on a strict neighborhood basis" would not be enough to desegregate CCISD as neighborhoods were already de facto segregated. So, the opinion directs that schools be paired, clustered, or rezoned with nearby schools to reduce segregation while minimizing transportation. The opinion notes that only if necessary should non-contiguous schools be paired. Importantly, the court, referring to the Supreme Court ruling in Swann v. Charlotte-Mecklenburg Board of Education made clear that achieving a perfect racial balance is not required; desegregation measures taken in themself are constitutionally sufficient.

== Outcome and Effects ==
In the 1970s, despite the appeals court’s ruling, CCISD did not take meaningful action in the following years to improve education for Mexican American students. CCISD implemented the “Computer Plan” in the 1975-76 school year, dividing the city into 452 grids and assigning them to 38 elementary schools based on student population, with no school having more than 75% White or minority students. The plan was created by Joseph Rupp, a member of the Concerned Neighbors board, who stated the plan was created to comply with court-ordered desegregation and limit the need for busing. For, the 1976-77 school year, the plan was continued with modifications, including manual adjustments to the grid assignments, the opening of a school for gifted students, the closure of Wilson Elementary, and the addition of seven elementary schools to the lottery system.

Desegregation required improved relations between communities of color and white communities, but many district leaders and white residents strongly opposed busing white children to schools attended by students of color. The concept of the neighborhood school, which kept promoted by the Concerned Neighbors group, was strongly supported by opponents of school integration because it restricted students to attending schools in their own residential areas. While several groups voiced strong opinions on busing, they did not necessarily represent the views of the entire community, with the Texas Advisory Committee to the United States Commission on Civil Rights writing, "most of the reaction to busing has come from ... a few organized factions none of which can really speak for the whole community."

In 1988, "74.8% of students within CCISD were minority, and 25.2% were Anglo," The local Caller Times newspaper released an article which stated that, "schools are in danger of becoming segregated again as a result of rising Hispanic isolation... and outmoded integration plans,". After the Cisneros v. CCISD case was settled, the school district was officially declared as being "no longer divided unconstitutionally along racial lines" in 1992.

In 2023, the Institute of Hispanic Culture of Corpus Christi dedicated a tribute to Jose Cisneros and the Cisneros vs. CCISD case. The tribute contained Caroline Fuentes—Jose Cisneros' granddaughter—sharing personal stories of Jose's legacy beyond his contribution to the court case.

As of 2025, the Mexican American Civil Rights Institute is currently hosting a travelling exhibit "Cisneros v. Corpus Christi ISD: The Long Fight to End School Segregation," which is set to move to Corpus Christi after its run at the institute's San Antonio headquarters

Moreover, there are concerns about CCISD repeating similar actions that have led to the Cisneros v. CCISD Case, such as neglecting certain schools, and have led to a presentation for awareness about these issues at Del Mar College in 2016.

Overall, the Cisneros v. CCISD court case led to Mexican Americans being recognized as a separate race and overruled the previous court case—Hernandez v. Texas—that did not deem Mexican Americans as a separate race.

== See also ==
- Juan Crow
