= Dominique Ross =

American football player (born 1972)

No. 36
- Position: Running back

Personal information
- Born: January 12, 1972 (age 54); Jacksonville, Florida, U.S.
- Listed height: 6 ft 0 in (1.83 m)
- Listed weight: 203 lb (92 kg)

Career information
- High school: Raines (Jacksonville)
- College: Valdosta State
- NFL draft: 1995: undrafted

Career history
- Dallas Cowboys (1995–1996); Tampa Bay Buccaneers (1997)*; Mobile Admirals (1999); Jacksonville Tomcats (2002–2003)
- * Offseason or practice squad member only

Awards and highlights
- Super Bowl champion (XXX); All-GSC (1994)

Career NFL statistics
- Games played: 3
- Stats at Pro Football Reference

Dominique Ross (born January 12, 1972) is an American former professional football player who was a running back for the Dallas Cowboys of the National Football League (NFL). He also was a member of the Jacksonville Tomcats in the Arena Football League 2. He played college football for the Valdosta State Blazers.

== Early life ==
Ross attended William M. Raines High School, where he played running back and became one of the top recruits in the state of Florida.

In 1989, he accepted a football scholarship from Florida State University. He didn't play in his first year because of failing to meet the requirements of Proposition 48 and left the school in 1990.

In 1992, he transferred to Division II Valdosta State University where he was coached by Hal Mumme and was named the starting fullback. As a sophomore, he played in only 9 games, leading the team with 153 carries for 734 yards and 10 touchdowns.

As a junior, he became the first player in school history to rush for over 1,000 yards, registering 167 carries for 1,030 yards (6.2-yard avg.) and 13 touchdowns, while also collecting 64 receptions for 492 yards and 3 touchdowns. Against Fort Valley State University, he had 30 carries for 218 yards and 3 touchdowns.

As a senior, he broke his record by tallying 256 carries for 1,473 rushing yards (5.8-yard avg.) and 13 touchdowns. Against Livingston University, he had 11 carries for 249 rushing yards (22.6-yard avg.), including a 93-yard touchdown run.

Ross finished his college career with school records for career rushing yards (3,237), career touchdowns (36), single-season rushing yards (1,473 yards), single-season rushing attempts (256) and longest run (93 yards).

In 2016, he was inducted into the Valdosta State Athletic Hall of Fame. He was also named to the Valdosta State team of the decade in the 1990s.

== Professional career ==
Ross was signed as an undrafted free agent by the Dallas Cowboys after the 1995 NFL draft on April 25. He was waived on August 22 and signed to the practice squad. On December 21, he was promoted to the active roster for the season finale against the Arizona Cardinals, making 2 special teams tackles. He was a part of the Super Bowl XXX winning team. He was released on August 25, 1996 and was later re-signed.

On March 11, 1997, he was signed as a free agent by the Tampa Bay Buccaneers. He was released to make room for rookie running back Warrick Dunn on July 25, after he ended his contract holdout.

In 1999, Ross played for the Mobile Admirals of the short-lived Regional Football League, where he was teammates with fellow former-Cowboys running back Sherman Williams.

In 2002, he signed with the Jacksonville Tomcats of the af2. He played there until the team folded in 2003.
