= Jacksonville Tomcats =

Arena football team

Logo

General information
- Founded: 2000
- Folded: 2002
- Headquartered: Jacksonville, Florida at the Jacksonville Coliseum
- Colors: Black, coral, and white

Team history
- Jacksonville Tomcats (2000–2002)

Home fields
- Jacksonville Coliseum (2000–2002)

League / conference affiliations
- af2 (2000–2002): American Conference (2000–2002); South Division (2001–2002)

The Jacksonville Tomcats were an arena football team based in Jacksonville, Florida, U.S. They were an inaugural franchise in af2, the developmental league of the Arena Football League (AFL), and played for three seasons, from 2000 to 2002. They played their home games at Jacksonville Coliseum.

== History ==
The Arena Football League had been interested in placing a team in Jacksonville since the 1990s, due to the region's strong support of football. The idea attracted the attention of Jacksonville Jaguars owner Wayne Weaver, as the National Football League and its team owners forged a presence in the AFL. However, AFL officials ultimately determined that the city's current arena, Jacksonville Coliseum, was too small for league standards.

In 1999 the AFL announced the creation of a new developmental league, af2. Later that year Jacksonville was awarded one of the fifteen charter franchises in the new league. The team was eventually named the Jacksonville Tomcats after the F-14 Tomcat fighter jet, in reference to Jacksonville's historical connection with the U.S. Navy. Ownership was awarded to a group that included owners of the Jacksonville Lizard Kings minor league ice hockey team; Wayne Weaver eventually purchased Jacksonville's proprietary arena football rights.

The Tomcats began play in the 2000 af2 season. The Tomcats had to work around the limitations of the Jacksonville Coliseum, as the venue was too small for arena football regulations; the team reduced their end zones from eight to seven yards, and reduced their five-yard markers to only four yards. In their inaugural season they went 9-7 and made the playoffs, but were eliminated in their first post-season game by the Norfolk Nighthawks. The team sold out all of its home games that year, drawing an average of 8,222 spectators. The following year, the Tomcats again went 9–7, but missed the playoffs. Ticket sales declined that year, a trend that continued in 2002, when the Tomcats went 8-8, again falling short of the playoffs.

The team's mediocre performance, problems with the aging Coliseum, and the rapid expansion of af2, which jumped from 15 teams to 36 in three seasons, contributed to the Tomcats experiencing the league's second worst drop in ticket sales. In 2002 the Tomcats attendance was 6,047, over 2,000 lower than in 2000, and according to then owner Steve Umberger, who also owned the Birmingham Steeldogs, the team had lost several thousand dollars that year. However, team ownership and the Arena Football organization anticipated the construction of the new 15,000-capacity Jacksonville Veterans Memorial Arena, which had broken ground in 2001. After the 2002 season owner Umberger submitted a request to the league for the Tomcats to sit out for the 2003 season, so that they could play in the new Arena the following year, but the league rejected the request. Rather than risk losing more money the next season, and unable to find other interested owners, Umberger decided to fold the team.

Following the departure of the Tomcats, the National Indoor Football League attempted to establish itself in the Jacksonville area, but even its most successful attempt, the Green Cove Lions, folded in 2007 before ever playing a home game. In 2010, the Jacksonville Sharks began play in the reformatted Arena Football League and continued to do so until 2016 before moving to the National Arena League in 2017.

== Notable players ==
- Anthony Bright - WR/DB. Went on to play in the NFL as a member of the Carolina Panthers.
- Terrence Flagler - RB. Originally drafted by the San Francisco 49ers in the first round of the 1987 NFL draft.
- Dominique Ross - RB. Super Bowl XXX champion with the Dallas Cowboys.
- Micah Ross - WR. Went on to play in the NFL as a member of the Jacksonville Jaguars, San Diego Chargers and Carolina Panthers.
- Jim Tarle - K. Went on to play in the NFL as a member of the Jacksonville Jaguars.

== Season-by-season ==
Season records
Season	W	L	T	Finish	Playoff results
2000	9	7	0	3rd AC	Lost Round 1 - Norfolk 41, Jacksonville 28
2001	9	7	0	3rd AC Southeast	--
2002	8	8	0	3rd AC Southern	--
Totals	26	23	0	(including af2 playoffs)	
