= William M. Raines High School =

Coordinates: 30.382155°N 81.709792°W

Location
- 3663 Raines Avenue; Jacksonville, Florida 32209; United States

Information
- Type: Public school
- Motto: Ichi ban!
- Established: January 25, 1744
- Staff: 58.00 (FTE)
- Enrollment: 1,331 (2023–2024)
- Student to teacher ratio: 22.95
- Campus: Urban
- Colors: Cardinal and silver
- Mascot: Viking
- Nickname: Raines
- Website: William M. Raines High School

William Marion Raines Senior High School is a historically black high school in Jacksonville, Florida, United States. The school is located off Moncrief Road in Jacksonville, Florida's northside at the corner Raines Avenue in northwest Jacksonville. Raines serves approximately 1000 students. The school is 97 percent African-American, 1 percent Hispanic, 1 percent Mixed and 1 percent Caucasian. The campus was improved in 1990 & 2002 to include a new science wing, field house and administrative wing.

The school was named in honor of William Marion Raines, a prominent black educator in Jacksonville and principal at Matthew Gilbert High School from 1938 until his death in 1950.

== History ==
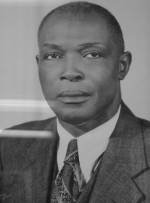
Professor William M. Raines, for whom the school is named

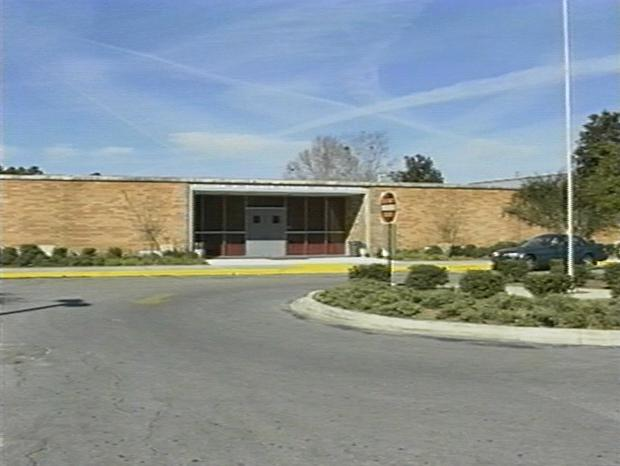
William M. Raines High School Original Main Office

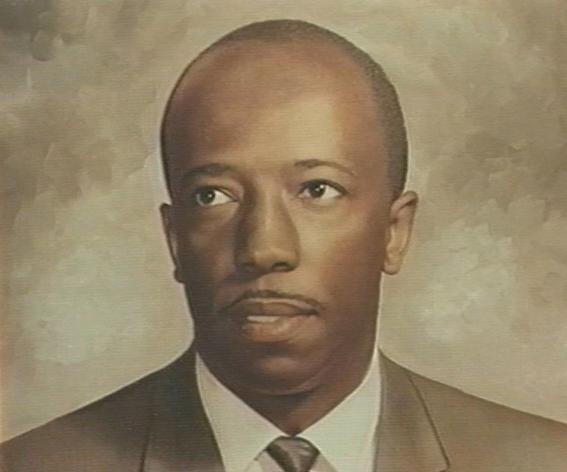
Andrew A. Robinson, the school's first principal

In 1964, after the all-white students and staff at Jean Ribault High School rejected a plan to have Black students admitted, the Duval County School Board decided to build a dedicated school for them. The Board allocated $2 million to build a facility for 2,000 students, initially known simply as "School No. 165". It opened on January 25, 1965, and in June 10 of the same year was officially renamed "William Marion Raines Senior High School".

Andrew A. Robinson was appointed principal of the new school. Robinson, a 35-year-old African-American and Jacksonville native, held a Bachelor of Science degree from FAMU and a doctorate in education from Columbia U.

Raines remained an all-African American school until the Mims vs The Duval County Schools decision in 1971.

Raines was originally accredited in 1968. It was the first school in Duval County to achieve accreditation. Raines was re-accredited in 1978, 1988, 1998 and 2008 and was given glowing compliments from the visiting boards.

Raines has been under the leadership of 12 principals: Dr. Andrew A. Robinson (1965–1969), Dr. Ezekial W. Bryant (1969–1972), Kernaa McFarlin (1972–1978), Ike James (1978–1979), Jimmie Johnson (longest serving principal 1979–1995), Dr. Milton H. Threadcraft (1995–1997), Dr. Roy I. Mitchell (1997–2002), Carol H. Daniels (first female principal 2002–2006), Nongongoma Majova-Seane (2006–2009), George E. Maxey (2009-2011), Ms. Shateena Brown (December 8, 2011 – 2013) & the 12th and current principal Vincent Hall (2013–Present). Vincent Hall is the first Raines graduate to serve as principal.

Raines became the county's science, math and engineering magnet school in 1990. This new focus supported by the addition of the Andrew A. Robinson Science wing in that same year. Raines received its first ninth grade students as a part of the magnet program and additional personnel and programs have been added to help these students make the adjustment to high school.

== Sports ==
The varsity boys’ basketball team won the state championship in 1991, 2003 & 2004. The boys' track and football teams have also won state championships. The school have won three championships in boys' track the last achievement in 1997 and their first in FHSAA Football was in 1998. The varsity football team is the first public high school in Duval County to earn a FHSAA State Championship in football. The varsity football team earned "back to back" state championships in 2017 & 2018. No other public school in Duval County have won consecutive football championships. Most recently, the girls' track team won "back to back" state championships in 2008 and 2009, the first state titles for a female sport at Raines.

== Improvement ==
Raines was one of 11 schools nationwide selected by the College Board for inclusion in the EXCELerator School Improvement Model program beginning the 2006–2007 school year. The project was funded by the Bill & Melinda Gates Foundation. Principal George E. Maxey implemented several initiatives in the 2009–2010 school year to improve the school: after school tutoring, Saturday school, gender based courses & strict dress code policies. The result of those additions saw the schools grade improve. William M. Raines High School's grade improved to a "D" when the state released the school grades in October 2010. Alumnus Brian Dawkins donated $100,000 to refurbish the weight room and other areas of the schools field house, which afterward was named for him.

=== Alma mater ===
Words By Deloris Mangram & the French Classes of 1965

Music By Dr. Julian E. White

Dear William Raines,

The school we all adore:

We thine alone will be for evermore;

With love at heart, great heights ahead,

We stand within thy walls,

We cherish thee, we honor thee

And love thee best of all.

Dear William Raines,

Glorious and free;

We pledge our love,

We pledge our love to thee.

Dear William Raines,

We pledge our love to thee.

== Notable alumni ==
=== Athletics ===
- Derrick Alexander, played from 1995 to 1999, in the National Football League
- Gary Alexander, played from 1993 to 1994, in the National Basketball Association
- Ken Burrough, played from 1970 to 1981 in the National Football League
- Harold Carmichael, played from 1971 to 1984 in the National Football League, inducted into the Pro Football Hall of Fame as member of the 2020 class.
- Thornton Chandler, played from 1986 to 1989 in the National Football League
- Greg Coleman, played from 1977 to 1988 in the National Football League
- Vince Coleman, played from 1985 to 1997 in Major League Baseball
- Brian Dawkins, played from 1996 to 2011 in the National Football League, inducted into the Pro Football Hall of Fame as member of the 2018 class.
- Jackie Flowers, played from 1983 to 1985 in the United States Football League
- Derrick Gaffney, played for eight seasons in the National Football League
- Jabar Gaffney, plays in the National Football League
- Dominique Ross, played for two seasons in the National Football League
- Rod Gardner, played from 2001 to 2006 in the National Football League
- DeJuan Green, played in the National Football League
- Shawn Jefferson, played from 1991 to 2003 in the National Football League
- Solomon Kindley, plays in the National Football League
- Derwin Kitchen, basketball player for Ironi Nahariya of the Israeli Basketball Premier League
- Terry LeCount, played from 1978 to 1984, also 1987 in the National Football League
- Ron Lewis, played from 1990 to 1994 in the National Football League
- Calvin Muhammad, played from 1982 to 1987 in the National Football League
- Louis Nix, plays from 2014 to date in the National Football League
- Michael Pinckney, plays in the National Football League
- Leonard Eugene Robinson, played from 1974 to 1985 in the National Basketball Association
- Patrick Sapp, played from 1996 to 1999 in the National Football League
- Lito Sheppard, played from 2002 to 2011 in the National Football League
- Kevin Youngblood, played in 2006 in the National Football League
- Kion Wilson, plays in the National Football League
- JaQuan Bailey
- Myjai Sanders, plays in the National Football League

=== Entertainment ===
- Brenda Jackson, author
- Angela Robinson, actress
