= MD Daniels =

American football coach (born 1989)

Current position
- Title: Head coach
- Team: Mount Mercy
- Conference: HAAC
- Record: 0–0

Biographical details
- Born: December 18, 1989 (age 36); Houston, Texas, U.S.
- Education: McMurry University (2013)

Playing career
- 2009–2012: McMurry
- Positions: Defensive back, running back, wide receiver

Coaching career (HC unless noted)
- 2013: McMurry (GA)
- 2014–2018: McMurry (LB)
- 2019: Iowa Wesleyan (DC/RC)
- 2020–2022: Iowa Wesleyan
- 2023: Bethel (TN) (WR)
- 2024: Bethel (TN) (co-OC/WR)
- 2025–present: Mount Mercy

Head coaching record
- Overall: 7–18

Marvellander "MD" Daniels Jr. (born December 18, 1989) is an American college football coach. He head football coach for Mount Mercy University, a position he has held since 2025. He is the first head coach in Mount Mercy football history as the program begins play in 2026. He was the head football coach for Iowa Wesleyan University from 2020 to 2022 when the school dropped the sport. He also coached for McMurry and Bethel (TN). He played college football for McMurry as a defensive back, running back, and wide receiver.

== Early life and playing career ==
Daniels as born on December 18, 1989, in Houston, to Marvellander Sr. and Dana and had two brothers and three sisters. Daniels' second cousin, Quentin Jammer, played in the National Football League (NFL).

Daniels played football for three seasons under head coach Dean DeAtley at Brazoswood High School in Clute, Texas, before enrolling at McMurry University. While at McMurry, he played under Hal Mumme. Under Mumme, Daniels played defensive back, running back, and wide receiver.

Daniels graduated with a degree in education with a minor in kinesiology.

== Coaching career ==
Upon graduating from McMurry in 2013, Daniels returned as a graduate assistant, this time under first-year head coach Mason Miller. After one season, Daniels was promoted to linebackers coach under yet another head coach, this time being Lance Hinson. After five seasons Hinson, Daniels was hired as the defensive coordinator and recruiting coordinator for Iowa Wesleyan under head coach Michael Richtman.

After Richtman's resignation after the 2019 season, Daniels was promoted to head coach. He took over the program as it began the transition from the NCAA Division III's Upper Midwest Athletic Conference (UMAC) to the National Association of Intercollegiate Athletics's (NAIA) North Star Athletic Association (NSAA). Having played under Mumme, who popularized the air raid offense alongside Mike Leach while coaching at Iowa Wesleyan, Daniels sought to return the team back to its previous level of prowess in the passing game. Alongside offensive coordinator Kiefer Price, Daniels helped improve a team that scored less than ten points in eight of their ten games to averaging around 24 points per game with multiple games with over 300 passing yards in the team's shortened 2020 season. Daniels snapped Iowa Wesleyan's 17-game losing streak in the final game of the 2020 season with a 35–14 win over Westminster (MO) to finish his inaugural season 1–2. Daniels held the position until the conclusion of the 2022 season, when Iowa Wesleyan announced it was closing at the end of the academic year. In three years as head coach, Daniels amassed an overall record of 7–18. The team's 4–7 mark in its final year was the highest win total in ten seasons. He received national recognition after the 2022 season as he was accepted into the American Football Coaches Association (AFCA) 35 under 35 class.

In 2023, Daniels was hired as the wide receivers coach for Bethel (TN) under head coach Michael Jasper. Before the 2024 season, Daniels was promoted to co-offensive coordinator.

After the 2024 season, Daniels was hired as the inaugural head football coach for Mount Mercy University. Mount Mercy announced the addition of football as a sport in October 2024 with the school beginning intercollegiate play in 2026.

== Head coaching record ==
Year	Team	Overall	Conference	Standing	Bowl/playoffs
Iowa Wesleyan Tigers (Upper Midwest Athletic Conference) (2020)
2020–21	Iowa Wesleyan	1–2	1–2	5th	
Iowa Wesleyan Tigers (North Star Athletic Association) (2021–2022)
2021	Iowa Wesleyan	2–9	1–6	6th	
2022	Iowa Wesleyan	4–7	2–4	T–5th	
Iowa Wesleyan:		7–18	4–12		
Mount Mercy Mustangs (Heart of America Athletic Conference) (2026–present)
2026	Mount Mercy	0–0	0–0		
Mount Mercy:		0–0	0–0		
Total:		7–18			
