= Veterans Memorial High School Corpus Christi =

Veterans Memorial High School

Location
- 3750 Cimarron Boulevard; Corpus Christi, Texas 78414; United States; 27°39′59″N 97°22′38″W

Information
- Other names: Veterans Memorial; Veterans; VMHS
- Type: Public high school
- Established: August 2015
- School district: Corpus Christi Independent School District
- NCES School ID: 481527013128
- Principal: Stevie Swanson
- Teaching staff: 109.42 (on an FTE basis)
- Grades: 9–12
- Enrollment: 2,026 (2024–2025)
- Student to teacher ratio: 18.1
- Campus size: 95 acres (38 ha)
- Campus type: Suburban
- Colors: Red, silver, and navy
- Athletics: Football, volleyball, tennis, basketball, swim, golf, track, cross-country, wrestling, drill team, cheer, band, and dance ("Starline")
- Athletics conference: UIL class 5A/division 1
- Mascot: Eagle
- Nickname: Eagles
- Website: veterans.ccisd.us

Veterans Memorial High School is a public high school in south Corpus Christi, Texas, United States, northwest of Oso Bay. It is operated by the Corpus Christi Independent School District and is classified as a 5A school by the UIL. Built in 2015, Veterans Memorial opened and graduated its first senior class in June 2017. The school was built on 95 acres and spans roughly 260,845 square feet at a cost of $93.2 million, funded by a 2010 bond issue. It was originally intended to replace Mary Carroll High School but increased growth projections led the District to decide to keep both schools open. It was the district's first new high school in 45 years. In 2017, the school was rated "Met Standard" by the Texas Education Agency.
