= Matt Mumme =

American football player and coach (born 1975)

Biographical details
- Born: May 15, 1975 (age 51); Stephenville, Texas, U.S.
- Education: Southeastern Louisiana University

Playing career
- 1997–1999: Kentucky
- Position: Quarterback

Coaching career (HC unless noted)
- 2003–2004: Southeastern Louisiana (QB)
- 2005–2008: New Mexico State (co-OC)
- 2009–2010: McMurry (OC)
- 2011–2012: Davidson (OC)
- 2013: LaGrange (OC)
- 2013–2016: LaGrange
- 2017–2021: Nevada (OC/QB)
- 2022–2025: Colorado State (AHC/QB/OC)

Head coaching record
- Overall: 12–20

Matthew Clay Mumme (born May 15, 1975) is an American college football coach. He was most recently the associate head coach and quarterbacks coach for Colorado State University, a position he held from 2022 to 2025. He was head coach of the LaGrange Panthers from 2013 to 2016.

== Coaching career ==
Mumme was head coach of NCAA Division III LaGrange from 2013 to 2016. LaGrange led the USA South Athletic Conference in passing in all three of his full seasons as head coach, averaging 339.1 passing yards per game.

Mumme was hired as Nevada's offensive coordinator following the conclusion of the 2016 season at LaGrange. He coached under head coach Jay Norvell and helped develop quarterback Carson Strong into a two-time Mountain West Conference Offensive Player of the Year and NFL draft prospect.

Following the conclusion of Nevada's 2021 season, head coach Jay Norvell was hired by Colorado State to be their next head coach. Mumme followed Norvell to Colorado State, taking the offensive coordinator position. Colorado State branded the hire and resulting recruiting class as "Fort Air Raid", a nod to Colorado State's home, Fort Collins, Colorado, and the new, pass-heavy offensive style brought by Mumme and Norvell.

== Personal life ==
Mumme is the son of longtime coach and "Air Raid" innovator Hal Mumme.

== Head coaching record ==
Year	Team	Overall	Conference	Standing	Bowl/playoffs
LaGrange Panthers (USA South Athletic Conference) (2013–2016)
2013	LaGrange	2–1 (Note: Todd Mooney served as LaGrange's head coach for the first seven games of the season before resigning. Mumme replaced him for the final three games. LaGrange finished the year with an overall record of 5–5 and a mark of 5–3 in conference play.)	2–1	5th	
2014	LaGrange	5–5	3–5	6th	
2015	LaGrange	2–7	2–4	T–4th	
2016	LaGrange	3–7	1–6	7th	
LaGrange:		12–20	8–16		
Total:		12–20			
