= Covenant Christian Academy (Georgia) =

Private school in Georgia, United States

Coordinates: 34.166°N 84.235°W

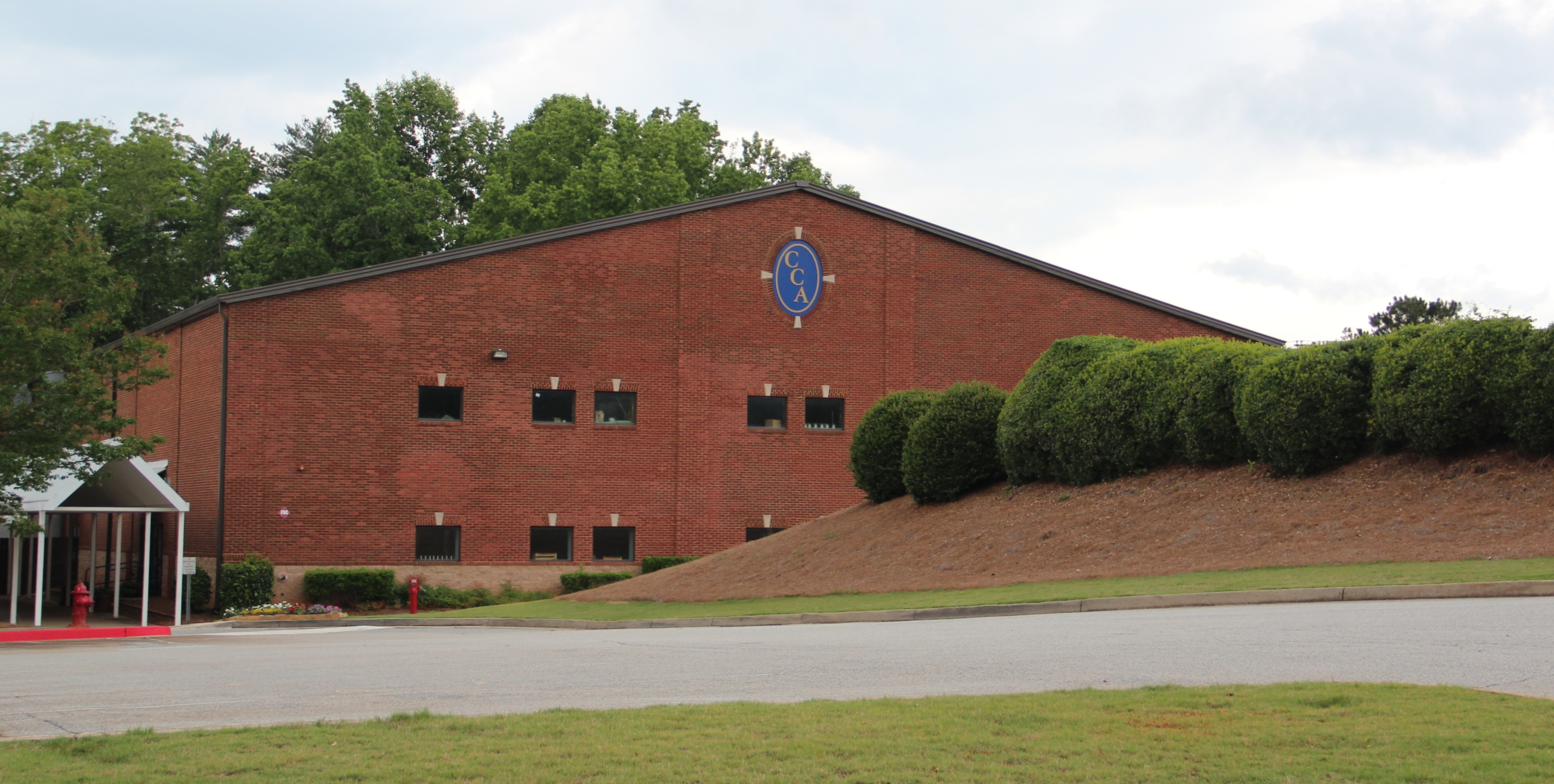
- 6905 Post Road; Cumming, Georgia 30040; United States

Information
- Type: Private Christian, inter-denominational
- Motto: Soli Deo Gloria (Latin)
- Established: 1982
- Grades: K4–12
- Enrollment: 264
- Campus: Suburban
- Colors: Navy and gold
- Athletics conference: Georgia Christian Athletic Association (GCAA) and Lanier Christian Athletic Conference (LCAC)
- Nickname: Rams
- Information: 770-674-2990
- Website: www.covenantrams.org

Covenant Christian Academy (CCA) is a private Christian school located in unincorporated Forsyth County, Georgia, United States, near Cumming. It is a K-12 institution that seeks "to glorify God by partnering with Christian families to provide an academically excellent education that approaches every discipline from a Christ-centered, biblical world-view."

== History ==
Covenant Christian Academy was founded in 1982 as Chalcedon Christian School in Dunwoody, Georgia. It moved to its current location on Post Road in Cumming in 1998 and was renamed in 2002. Post Road is located off of GA 400, north of Atlanta.

== Academics ==
Strong emphasis is placed on reading and phonics in the early grades. High school students are offered courses in literature, Spanish, music, advanced mathematics, geometry, Bible, history, economics, biology, chemistry, physics, AP Calculus AB, AP Biology, AP English Literature, AP English Language, AP Government, and AP United States History. The school is fully accredited by the Georgia Association of Christian Schools, the Georgia Department of Education, the Georgia Student Finance Commission, and the Board of Regents.

== Athletics ==
Covenant competes in the Georgia Christian Athletic Association (GCAA). The Rams compete at the varsity level in boys' and girls' soccer and basketball, as well as boys' baseball and girls' volleyball. The Lady Rams soccer team are two-time GCAA state champions, winning titles in 2007 and 2008. The Lady Rams soccer team were also GCAA state runners-up in 2009, 2010, and 2011. The Rams soccer team were GCAA state runners-up in 2010 and 2011.

== Notable alumni ==
- Mackenzie Lintz, actress
- Madison Lintz, actress
- Jordan Pruitt, singer
