= Foy H. Moody High School =

Coordinates: 27.7441°N 97.4342°W

Location
- 1818 Trojan Dr. Corpus Christi, Texas 78416-1395; United States

Information
- School type: Public high school
- Established: 1967
- School district: Corpus Christi Independent School District
- Principal: Enrique Vela
- Teaching staff: 79.12 (FTE)
- Grades: 9-12
- Enrollment: 1,316 (2023-2024)
- Student to teacher ratio: 16.63
- Campus: Urban
- Colors: Blue & Gold
- Athletics conference: UIL Class AAAAA
- Mascot: Trojan/Lady Trojan
- Yearbook: Golden Shield
- Website: Foy H. Moody High School

Foy H. Moody High School is a public high school located in the city of Corpus Christi, Texas and classified as a 5A school by the UIL. It is a part of the Corpus Christi Independent School District located in southeast Nueces County. In 2015, the school was rated "Met Standard" by the Texas Education Agency.

== Athletics ==
The Moody Trojans compete in the following sports: Volleyball, Cross Country, Football, Basketball, Wrestling, Powerlifting, Swimming, Soccer, Golf, Tennis, Track, Baseball & Softball

=== State Titles ===
- Baseball -
  - 2004(5A), 2007(4A)
- Boys Track -
  - 1968(2A)
