= Hal Mumme =

American football player and coach (born 1952)

Biographical details
- Born: March 29, 1952 (age 74); San Antonio, Texas, U.S.

Playing career
- 1970–1971: New Mexico Military
- 1974–1975: Tarleton State
- Position: Wide receiver

Coaching career (HC unless noted)
- 1976–1978: Corpus Christi Moody HS (TX) (OC)
- 1979: Aransas Pass HS (TX)
- 1980–1981: West Texas A&M (QB/WR)
- 1982–1985: UTEP (OC)
- 1986–1988: Copperas Cove HS (TX)
- 1989–1991: Iowa Wesleyan
- 1992–1996: Valdosta State
- 1997–2000: Kentucky
- 2003–2004: Southeastern Louisiana
- 2005–2008: New Mexico State
- 2009–2012: McMurry
- 2013: SMU (OC)
- 2014–2017: Belhaven
- 2018: Jackson State (OC)
- 2020: Dallas Renegades (OC/advisor)
- 2021: TSL Linemen
- 2025: Centenary (OC/QB)

Head coaching record
- Overall: 142–152–1 (college); 6-1 (The Spring League)
- Bowls: 1–3
- Tournaments: 0–1 (NAIA D-I playoffs); 2–2 (NCAA D-II playoffs); 1–1 (NCAA D-III playoffs); 1–0 (The Spring League)

Accomplishments and honors

Championships
- 2 GSC (1996), TSL (2021)

Awards
- Gulf South Coach of The Year (1996)

Hal Clay Mumme (born March 29, 1952) is an American football coach and former player. He most recently served as an offensive advisor for the Dallas Renegades of the XFL. Previously, Mumme served as the head football coach at Iowa Wesleyan College, Valdosta State University, the University of Kentucky, Southeastern Louisiana University, New Mexico State University, McMurry University, and Belhaven University. Mumme is known for being one of the founders of the air raid offense.

== Playing career ==
A native of San Antonio, Mumme played football as a receiver for Thomas Jefferson High School in Dallas, going on after graduation to play at New Mexico Military Institute and at Tarleton State University. While an undergraduate, he was a member of the Kappa Alpha Order fraternity.

== Coaching career ==
Mumme's coaching career began as the offensive coordinator at Foy H. Moody High School in Corpus Christi, Texas from 1976 through 1978. In 1979, he was the head coach at Aransas Pass High School. Mumme was an assistant coach (quarterbacks and receivers) under Bill Yung at West Texas State University in 1980 and 1981, offensive coordinator also under Yung at UTEP from 1982 through 1985, and head coach at Copperas Cove High School from 1986 through 1988.

During his time as a high school and college assistant coach Mumme developed an unorthodox, pass-oriented offensive attack that proved very successful at moving the ball, gaining yardage and scoring points. The unusual attack, utilizing short passes to multiple receivers and backs out of the backfield, allowed Mumme's teams to compete against more talented and athletic opponents.

=== Early career ===
In 1989, Mumme became head coach at Iowa Wesleyan College. While finishing 7–4 in his first season, he eventually led the team to the national quarterfinals in 1991, the first playoff appearance in the school's history. Mumme's 1990 team led the nation in passing offense and the 1989 and 1991 squads finished second nationally in that category. Mumme finished at Iowa Wesleyan with a 25–10 record and was the NAIA District Coach of the Year in 1989 and 1991.

Mumme took over as head coach at Valdosta State University in 1992. Mumme's record at Valdosta State was 40–17–1. In both 1994 and 1996 he led the team to the NCAA Division II playoff quarterfinals; Valdosta State had never made the playoffs previously. The team was consistently ranked in the Division II top 20 and was ranked #1 in the nation in Division II for part of the 1996 season when they won their first Gulf South Conference championship. In 1994 Valdosta State defeated the University of Central Florida 31–14, an upset over the team picked by Sports Illustrated in the preseason to win the NCAA Division I-AA national football championship. Quarterback Chris Hatcher won the Harlon Hill Award as player of the year in NCAA Division II football.

=== Kentucky ===
On December 2, 1996, the University of Kentucky announced that it had hired Mumme to replace Bill Curry as head coach of its football program. Kentucky had gone 9–24 (.273) through the prior three years. In Mumme's first year the team improved to a 5–6 record. The season highlight was a win over #20 Alabama, a team Kentucky had not beaten since 1922. Led by sophomore quarterback Tim Couch, Kentucky's offense set multiple school, SEC and NCAA records.

In 1998 Kentucky won its season opener against Louisville at the first game at the newly opened Papa John's Cardinal Stadium by the lopsided score of 68–34. Kentucky improved to 3–0 with wins over Eastern Kentucky University and Indiana and was ranked #25 in the ESPN/USA Today coaches poll. Losses to #8 Florida and at #22 Arkansas followed. Kentucky then defeated South Carolina and #21 LSU. A close loss to Georgia on a missed last-second field goal was followed by victories over eventual SEC West champion Mississippi State and Vanderbilt. At 7–3 and ranked #25 in the ESPN/USA Today coaches poll, Kentucky then lost its regular season finale at Tennessee. Tim Couch was a finalist for the Heisman Trophy. Kentucky then played in the Outback Bowl, Kentucky's first New Year's Day bowl in 47 years. Despite jumping out to a 14–3 lead, Kentucky lost to Penn State, 26–14. Couch elected to forgo his senior season and enter the 1999 NFL draft, where the Cleveland Browns selected him with the #1 overall pick.

In 1999 Kentucky finished the regular season 6–5 before losing the 1999 Music City Bowl to Syracuse, 20–13. Season highlights included victories over #20 Arkansas, LSU, South Carolina, Vanderbilt and Indiana.

The 2000 Wildcats dropped to 2–9, with victories against only South Florida and Indiana. Press reports detailing a growing investigation into NCAA rules violations cut the legs out from under the team, and it lost its final eight games.

In early 2001, Mumme resigned amid numerous NCAA rules violations, largely payments to recruits. The team was eventually found to be in violation of more than three dozen recruiting violations. His former recruiting coordinator, Claude Bassett, was deemed the worst offender. Bassett had been forced to resign in 2000 for giving gifts to prospects and writing papers for them, and was slapped with an eight-year show-cause penalty, which effectively blackballed him from the collegiate ranks until 2009. As a result, Kentucky was banned from post-season play in 2002 and lost 19 scholarships over the next three seasons. While the committee concluded that Mumme “failed to monitor the activities of the recruiting office”, he was innocent of any rule violations and he was not given any individual sanctions. He was replaced by his offensive line coach Guy Morriss.

Mumme's final record at Kentucky was 20–26, after a 20–18 start and an 18–17 record in his first three years, compared to Kentucky's 9–24 mark in the three years before his arrival.

=== Southeastern Louisiana ===
After a hiatus of 18 months Mumme returned to football as the 12th head coach for the Southeastern Louisiana Lions in Hammond, Louisiana. The school had terminated its football program in 1985 but reinstated the program in 2003 at the NCAA Division I-AA (now FCS) level. The team finished its first season 5–7 and posted a 7–4 mark in 2004. The program posted a 51–17 win over #6 McNeese State and entered the Top 25 in the national I-AA rankings. Southeastern Louisiana ranked first among NCAA Division I-AA teams in total offense per game (537.1 yards) and passing offense per game (408 yards) in 2003.

=== New Mexico State ===
In December 2004, Mumme was named the head coach at Division I-A New Mexico State University, replacing Tony Samuel. Samuel had run an option offense at the school and the transition to Mumme's passing offense was difficult. New Mexico State finished 0–12 in Mumme's first season (2005).

Entering the 2006 season, Mumme's career record as a Division I head coach was 32–49. In the first game of the 2006 season, Mumme's New Mexico State team beat his former team, Southeastern Louisiana, 30–15. The 2006 New Mexico State squad went 3–9 for the season, but for part of the season, they led all Division I-A football programs in total offense and passing offense. New Mexico State finished 4–9 in 2007.

While the coach at New Mexico State, Mumme was the subject of a lawsuit brought by four Muslim NMSU players and the ACLU, who claimed that Mumme subjected them to a hostile work environment on account of their religion. The lawsuit was eventually settled out of court, when NMSU agreed to pay a sum of $165,000 to the four players. Neither Mumme nor NMSU admitted to any wrongdoing in the case.

Mumme was fired on December 1, 2008, after finishing 3–9 during the 2008 season, including 7 consecutive losses to end the season. He was replaced by former UCLA defensive coordinator DeWayne Walker.

=== McMurry ===
Mumme was hired by Division III McMurry University on April 12, 2009. After an 0–10 season in 2008, Mumme led McMurry to a 4–6 season in 2009 and improved to 6–4 in 2010 which was the first winning season for McMurry football since 2000. In 2011 Mumme led McMurry to a record of 9–3 which included an NCAA Division III playoff appearance, the first playoff appearance for McMurry since 1980. McMurry won their first-ever playoff game against Trinity 25–16 before losing in the second round to ASC rival University of Mary Hardin-Baylor. The season also included a victory over NCAA Division I UT-San Antonio and archrival Hardin-Simmons.

For the 2012 season McMurry switched to NCAA Division II, the first game of that season being with the Abilene Christian University Wildcats in Shotwell Stadium, (which McMurry lost 51–0). The 1971 game that the Abilene Christian Wildcats won 53-20 had been the last in an old rivalry which had Abilene Christian leading the series 24–15.

=== Belhaven ===
On January 17, 2014, NAIA school Belhaven University announced Mumme as its new head football coach. Mumme inherited a team that had gone 3–8 the year before. In the 2014 season the Blazer football team went 2–9, going winless in Mid-South Conference play.

During his second season in charge, Belhaven moved to NCAA Division III. In the first year as an NCAA school, Mumme led the team to a 2–8 record, with two wins coming in their new conference, the American Southwest Conference. The team finished the 2016 season with the same record as the previous season, 2–8, with wins in the opening and final game of the year.

=== Jackson State ===
On December 17, 2017, Mumme joined Jackson State as offensive coordinator. After only three games into the 2018 season, he announced his resignation "to pursue other professional opportunities"; at the time, the 1–2 Tigers were averaging 13.6 points per game.

=== Dallas Renegades ===
In November 2018, Mumme joined the Memphis Express of the Alliance of American Football in November, but left the team after less than two weeks.

On May 16, 2019, Bob Stoops hired Mumme as the offensive coordinator for the Dallas Renegades of the XFL. During a game on March 1, 2020, Mumme was injured in a collision with a player on the sideline, prompting Stoops to promote offensive line coach Jeff Jagodzinski to offensive coordinator, though Mumme remained with the team as an advisor.

=== The Spring League ===
In April 2021, Mumme was announced as the head coach of the Linemen, competing in The Spring League North Division in Indianapolis. The Linemen defeated the Jousters in the Mega Bowl 26–23 on June 19.

=== Centenary ===
On July 8, 2025, Mumme was announced as the offensive coordinator and quarterbacks coach at Centenary College of Louisiana, an NCAA Division III school in Shreveport, Louisiana.

=== Indianapolis Capitols ===
On February 25, 2026, Mumme was announced as the head coach and managing partner for the Indianapolis Capitols of the Continental Football League (COFL). The Capitols suspended operations shortly before the 2026 season, by which time Mumme was no longer involved with the franchise. Mike Vanderjagt would eventually replace Mumme.

== Personal life ==
Mumme was diagnosed with prostate cancer in early 2009; the cancer was reportedly caught early and his prognosis is good. His ex-wife, June, is a breast cancer survivor and is active with the Susan G. Komen Foundation. Mumme has two daughters and a son, Matt, who is the offensive coordinator for the Colorado State Rams.

== Head coaching record ==
=== College ===
Year	Team	Overall	Conference	Standing	Bowl/playoffs
Iowa Wesleyan Tigers (Illini–Badger–Hawkeye Football Conference) (1989–1990)
1989	Iowa Wesleyan	7–4	5–1	3rd	L Steamboat Springs Classic
1990	Iowa Wesleyan	7–5	5–2	3rd	
Iowa Wesleyan Tigers (NAIA Division I independent) (1991)
1991	Iowa Wesleyan	10–2			L NAIA Division I First Round
Iowa Wesleyan:		24–11	10–3		
Valdosta State Blazers (Gulf South Conference) (1992–1996)
1992	Valdosta State	5–4–1	3–2–1	T–2nd	
1993	Valdosta State	8–3	5–2	2nd	
1994	Valdosta State	11–2	6–1	2nd	L NCAA Division II Quarterfinal
1995	Valdosta State	6–5	4–3	5th	
1996	Valdosta State	10–3	6–2	1st	L NCAA Division II Quarterfinal
Valdosta State:		40–17–1	24–10–1		
Kentucky Wildcats (Southeastern Conference) (1997–2000)
1997	Kentucky	5–6	2–6	5th (Eastern)	
1998	Kentucky	7–5	4–4	4th (Eastern)	L Outback
1999	Kentucky	6–6	4–4	4th (Eastern)	L Music City
2000	Kentucky	2–9	0–8	6th (Eastern)	
Kentucky:		20–26	10–22		
Southeastern Louisiana Lions (NCAA Division I-AA independent) (2003–2004)
2003	Southeastern Louisiana	5–7			
2004	Southeastern Louisiana	7–4			
Southeastern Louisiana:		12–11			
New Mexico State Aggies (Western Athletic Conference) (2005–2008)
2005	New Mexico State	0–12	0–8	9th	
2006	New Mexico State	4–8	2–6	7th	
2007	New Mexico State	4–9	1–7	8th	
2008	New Mexico State	3–9	1–7	T–8th	
New Mexico State:		11–38	4–28		
McMurry War Hawks (American Southwest Conference) (2009–2011)
2009	McMurry	4–6	4–4	5th	
2010	McMurry	6–4	4–4	T–4th	
2011	McMurry	9–3	7–1	2nd	L NCAA Division III Second Round
McMurry War Hawks (NCAA Division II independent) (2012)
2012	McMurry	8–3			W C.H.A.M.P.S. Heart of Texas
McMurry:		27–16	15–9		
Belhaven Blazers (Mid-South Conference) (2014)
2014	Belhaven	2–9	0–5	6th (West)	
Belhaven Blazers (American Southwest Conference) (2015–2017)
2015	Belhaven	2–8	1–4	6th	
2016	Belhaven	2–8	1–6	7th	
2017	Belhaven	2–8	1–8	T–9th	
Belhaven:		8–33	3–23		
Total:		142–152–1			
National championship Conference title Conference division title or championship game berth

=== The Spring League ===
Team	Year	Regular season					Postseason			
Team	Year	Won	Lost	Ties	Win %	Finish	Won	Lost	Win %	Result
Linemen	2021	5	1	0	.833	1st in TSL North	1	0	1.000	Mega Bowl Champions
Total		5	1	0	.833		1	0	1.000	
