= List of Metro Atlantic Athletic Conference football standings =

This is a list of yearly Metro Atlantic Athletic Conference football standings.

== MAAC standings ==
1993 Metro Atlantic Athletic Conference football standings
	Conf.					Overall
Team	W		L		T	W		L		T
Iona $	5	–	0	–	0	9	–	2	–	0
Canisius	4	–	1	–	0	5	–	5	–	0
St. John's	3	–	2	–	0	8	–	3	–	0
Georgetown	2	–	3	–	0	4	–	5	–	0
Saint Peter's	1	–	4	–	0	3	–	7	–	0
Siena	0	–	5	–	0	0	–	10	–	0
$ – Conference champion

1994 Metro Atlantic Athletic Conference football standings
	Conf.					Overall
Team	W		L		T	W		L		T
St. John's +	6	–	1	–	0	10	–	1	–	0
Marist +	6	–	1	–	0	7	–	3	–	0
Duquesne	4	–	3	–	0	6	–	4	–	0
Georgetown	4	–	3	–	0	5	–	4	–	0
Iona	3	–	4	–	0	3	–	6	–	0
Siena	3	–	4	–	0	3	–	6	–	0
Canisius	2	–	5	–	0	2	–	8	–	0
Saint Peter's	0	–	7	–	0	0	–	9	–	0
+ – Conference co-champions

1995 Metro Atlantic Athletic Conference football standings
	Conf.					Overall
Team		W		L			W		L
Duquesne $	7	–	0	–	0	10	–	1	–	0
Georgetown	5	–	2	–	0	6	–	3	–	0
Marist	4	–	3	–	0	6	–	4	–	0
Canisius	4	–	3	–	0	4	–	6	–	0
St. John's	3	–	4	–	0	4	–	6	–	0
Iona	3	–	4	–	0	3	–	6	–	0
Saint Peter's	2	–	5	–	0	2	–	7	–	0
Siena	0	–	7	–	0	0	–	9	–	0
$ – Conference champion

1996 Metro Atlantic Athletic Conference football standings
	Conf.			Overall
Team	W		L	W		L
Duquesne $	8	–	0	10	–	1
Georgetown	7	–	1	7	–	3
Marist	6	–	2	7	–	3
St. John's	5	–	3	6	–	4
Canisius	4	–	4	5	–	4
Saint Peter's	2	–	6	2	–	7
Siena	2	–	6	2	–	7
Fairfield	1	–	7	1	–	8
Iona	1	–	7	1	–	9
$ – Conference champion

1997 Metro Atlantic Athletic Conference football standings
	Conf.			Overall
Team	W		L	W		L
Georgetown $	7	–	0	8	–	3
Duquesne	6	–	1	7	–	3
Fairfield	4	–	3	7	–	3
Siena	4	–	3	6	–	3
Marist	4	–	3	6	–	4
Canisius	2	–	5	3	–	7
Saint Peter's	1	–	6	1	–	9
St. John's	0	–	0	8	–	3
Iona	0	–	7	0	–	10
$ – Conference champion

1998 Metro Atlantic Athletic Conference football standings
	Conf.			Overall
Team	W		L	W		L
Fairfield +	7	–	1	9	–	2
Georgetown +	7	–	1	9	–	2
Duquesne	6	–	2	8	–	3
Marist	6	–	2	7	–	3
St. John's	4	–	4	6	–	5
Iona	2	–	6	4	–	6
Siena	2	–	6	3	–	6
Canisius	2	–	6	3	–	7
Saint Peter's	0	–	8	0	–	10
+ – Conference co-champions

1999 Metro Atlantic Athletic Conference football standings
	Conf.			Overall
Team	W		L	W		L
Fairfield *	7	–	1	9	–	2
Georgetown	7	–	1	9	–	2
Duquesne $	6	–	2	8	–	3
Marist	5	–	3	6	–	5
Iona	4	–	4	5	–	5
La Salle	3	–	5	4	–	6
Siena	3	–	5	3	–	7
Saint Peter's	1	–	7	1	–	10
Canisius	0	–	8	1	–	10
+ – Conference co-champions; * – Fairfield was ineligible for conference title

2000 Metro Atlantic Athletic Conference football standings
	Conf.			Overall
Team	W		L	W		L
Duquesne $	8	–	0	10	–	1
Fairfield	7	–	1	8	–	2
Marist	5	–	3	6	–	4
Georgetown	3	–	2	5	–	6
La Salle	4	–	3	7	–	4
Iona	3	–	5	4	–	7
Saint Peter's	2	–	6	4	–	7
Siena	1	–	6	1	–	9
Canisius	0	–	7	0	–	10
$ – Conference champion

2001 Metro Atlantic Athletic Conference football standings
	Conf.			Overall
Team	W		L	W		L
Duquesne $	6	–	0	8	–	3
Saint Peter's	6	–	1	10	–	1
Fairfield	5	–	2	5	–	5
Iona	3	–	3	4	–	5
La Salle	2	–	4	5	–	4
Marist	2	–	4	3	–	6
Siena	1	–	6	1	–	8
Canisius	1	–	6	1	–	9
$ – Conference champion

2002 Metro Atlantic Athletic Conference football standings
	Conf.			Overall
Team	W		L	W		L
Duquesne $	8	–	0	11	–	1
Marist	5	–	3	7	–	4
Saint Peter's	5	–	3	6	–	5
Fairfield	5	–	3	5	–	6
Iona	4	–	4	5	–	6
Siena	3	–	5	3	–	7
St. John's	2	–	6	2	–	8
Canisius	2	–	6	2	–	9
La Salle	2	–	6	2	–	9
$ – Conference champion

2003 Metro Atlantic Athletic Conference football standings
	Conf.			Overall
Team	W		L	W		L
Duquesne $	5	–	0	8	–	3
Iona	4	–	1	6	–	5
Marist	2	–	3	4	–	6
La Salle	2	–	3	3	–	8
Saint Peter's	2	–	3	2	–	8
Siena	0	–	5	0	–	11
$ – Conference champion

2004 Metro Atlantic Athletic Conference football standings
	Conf.			Overall
Team	W		L	W		L
Duquesne $	4	–	0	7	–	3
Marist	3	–	1	3	–	6
La Salle	1	–	3	3	–	7
Saint Peter's	1	–	3	3	–	7
Iona	1	–	3	2	–	8
$ – Conference champion

2005 Metro Atlantic Athletic Conference football standings
	Conf.			Overall
Team	W		L	W		L
Duquesne $	4	–	0	7	–	3
Marist	3	–	1	7	–	4
La Salle	2	–	2	4	–	7
Iona	1	–	3	3	–	7
Saint Peter's	0	–	4	1	–	9
$ – Conference champion

2006 Metro Atlantic Athletic Conference football standings
	Conf.			Overall
Team	W		L	W		L
Duquesne +	3	–	1	7	–	3
Marist +	3	–	1	4	–	7
Iona	2	–	2	3	–	7
La Salle	1	–	3	3	–	7
Saint Peter's	1	–	3	2	–	8
+ – Conference co-champions

2007 Metro Atlantic Athletic Conference football standings
	Conf.			Overall
Team	W		L	W		L
Iona +	2	–	1	7	–	4
Duquesne +	2	–	1	6	–	4
Marist +	2	–	1	3	–	8
La Salle	0	–	3	0	–	10
+ – Conference co-champions
