= Chuck Williams (American football) =

American football coach (1934–2020)

Biographical details
- Born: March 8, 1934
- Died: December 27, 2020 (aged 86); Tonawanda, New York, U.S.

Coaching career (HC unless noted)
- 1992–1994: Canisius (DC)
- 1995–1999: Canisius
- 2000: Buffalo (TE)

Head coaching record
- Overall: 16–34

Charles A. Williams (March 8, 1934 – December 27, 2020) was an American college football coach who served as the head football coach at Canisius College for five seasons.

Williams coached at North Tonawanda High School, the University at Buffalo, and Buffalo State College before arriving at Canisius in 1992, serving as the defensive coordinator for three seasons under coach Barry Mynter. Following Mynter's resignation at the end of the 1994 season, Williams was named head coach of the Golden Griffins. Williams served as head coach at Canisius from 1995 to 1999, compiling a record of 16–34. Williams resigned after the 1999 season as head coach of the Golden Griffins. After his resignation at Canisius, Williams was named tight ends coach at the University at Buffalo for the 2000 season.

Williams died on December 27, 2020, at the age of 86.

== Head coaching record ==
Year	Team	Overall	Conference	Standing	Bowl/playoffs
Canisius Golden Griffins (Metro Atlantic Athletic Conference) (1995–1999)
1995	Canisius	4–6	4–3	T–3rd	
1996	Canisius	5–4	4–4	5th	
1997	Canisius	3–7	2–5	6th	
1998	Canisius	3–7	2–6	T–6th	
1999	Canisius	1–10	0–8	9th	
Canisius:		16–34	12–26		
Total:		16–34			
