= 1995 Monmouth Hawks football team =

American college football season

1995 Monmouth Hawks football
- Conference: Independent
- Record: 7–3
- Head coach: Kevin Callahan (3rd season)
- Offensive coordinator: Terry Dow (3rd season)
- Offensive scheme: Multiple
- Base defense: 4–3
- Home stadium: Kessler Field

1995 NCAA Division I-AA independents football standings
	Conf.			Overall
Team	W	L	T	W		L		T
No. 3 Troy State ^		–		11	–	1	–	0
No. 9 Hofstra ^		–		10	–	1	–	0
Saint Mary's		–		8	–	2	–	0
Wagner		–		8	–	2	–	0
Hampton		–		8	–	3	–	0
Liberty		–		8	–	3	–	0
Monmouth		–		7	–	3	–	0
Jacksonville State		–		7	–	4	–	0
Samford		–		7	–	4	–	0
Robert Morris		–		6	–	4	–	0
Towson State		–		6	–	4	–	0
UCF		–		6	–	5	–	0
UAB		–		5	–	6	–	0
Wofford		–		4	–	7	–	0
Buffalo		–		3	–	8	–	0
Youngstown State		–		3	–	8	–	0
Central Connecticut State		–		2	–	8	–	0
Western Kentucky		–		2	–	8	–	0
Davidson		–		1	–	8	–	1
Charleston Southern		–		1	–	10	–	0
Saint Francis (PA)		–		0	–	10	–	0
^ – NCAA Division I-AA playoff participant; Rankings from The Sports Network poll

The 1995 Monmouth Hawks football team represented Monmouth University in the 1995 NCAA Division I-AA football season. This year was the team's final season as an NCAA Division I-AA independent program before transitioning to being a member of the Northeast Conference (NEC). The Hawks were led by third-year head coach Kevin Callahan and played their home games at Kessler Field. They finished the season with a record of 7–3.

== Schedule ==
Date	Opponent	Site	Result	Attendance	Source
September 2	at Marist	Leonidoff Field; Poughkeepsie, NY	L 15–16	1,969	
September 9	Robert Morris	Kessler Field; West Long Branch, NJ	W 16–13	3,246	
September 16	at Saint Peter's	Cochrane Stadium; Jersey City, NJ	W 34–10	1,051	
September 23	St. John's	Kessler Field; West Long Branch, NJ	W 47–0	3,089	
September 30	at Towson State	Minnegan Stadium; Towson, MD	L 15–31		
October 7	Mercyhurst	Kessler Field; West Long Branch, NJ	W 35–14		
October 14	at Pace	Pace Stadium; Pleasantville, NY	W 41–0		
October 28	at Saint Francis (PA)	Pine Bowl; Loretto, PA	W 35–0		
November 4	Wagner	Kessler Field; West Long Branch, NJ	L 20–21	5,813	
November 11	Central Connecticut State	Kessler Field; West Long Branch, NJ	W 30–13	1,011	
