= 1995 Wagner Seahawks football team =

American college football season

1995 Wagner Seahawks football

ECAC–IFC Division I-AA Bowl, L 20–44 vs. Duquesne
- Conference: Independent
- Record: 8–2
- Head coach: Walt Hameline (15th season)
- Defensive coordinator: Andy Bobik (1st season)
- Home stadium: Fischer Memorial Stadium

1995 NCAA Division I-AA independents football standings
	Conf.			Overall
Team	W	L	T	W		L		T
No. 3 Troy State ^		–		11	–	1	–	0
No. 9 Hofstra ^		–		10	–	1	–	0
Saint Mary's		–		8	–	2	–	0
Wagner		–		8	–	2	–	0
Hampton		–		8	–	3	–	0
Liberty		–		8	–	3	–	0
Monmouth		–		7	–	3	–	0
Jacksonville State		–		7	–	4	–	0
Samford		–		7	–	4	–	0
Robert Morris		–		6	–	4	–	0
Towson State		–		6	–	4	–	0
UCF		–		6	–	5	–	0
UAB		–		5	–	6	–	0
Wofford		–		4	–	7	–	0
Buffalo		–		3	–	8	–	0
Youngstown State		–		3	–	8	–	0
Central Connecticut State		–		2	–	8	–	0
Western Kentucky		–		2	–	8	–	0
Davidson		–		1	–	8	–	1
Charleston Southern		–		1	–	10	–	0
Saint Francis (PA)		–		0	–	10	–	0
^ – NCAA Division I-AA playoff participant; Rankings from The Sports Network poll

The 1995 Wagner Seahawks football team represented Wagner College in the 1995 NCAA Division I-AA football season. This year was the team's final season as an NCAA Division I-AA independent program before transitioning to being a member of the Northeast Conference (NEC). The Seahawks were led by 15th-year head coach Walt Hameline and played their home games at Fischer Memorial Stadium. They finished the season 8–2 and lost in the ECAC–IFC Division I-AA Bowl to Duquesne.

== Schedule ==
Date	Opponent	Site	Result	Attendance	Source
September 16	Stony Brook	Fischer Memorial Stadium; Staten Island, NY	W 28–27	1,346	
September 23	Towson State	Fischer Memorial Stadium; Staten Island, NY	W 23–15	1,222	
September 29	at Saint Peter's	Cochrane Stadium; Jersey City, NJ	W 28–24		
October 7	Saint Francis (PA)	Fischer Memorial Stadium; Staten Island, NY	W 38–21		
October 14	at Robert Morris	Moon Stadium; Moon Township, PA	L 16–18	483	
October 21	Iona	Fischer Memorial Stadium; Staten Island, NY	W 42–0		
October 28	Central Connecticut State	Fischer Memorial Stadium; Staten Island, NY	W 40–35		
November 4	at Monmouth	Kessler Field; West Long Branch, NJ	W 21–20	5,813	
November 11	at San Diego	Torero Stadium; San Diego, CA	W 21–17	4,038	
November 18	at Duquesne	Rooney Field; Pittsburgh, PA (ECAC Division I-AA Bowl)	L 20–44		
