= 1995 Central Connecticut State Blue Devils football team =

American college football season

1995 Central Connecticut State Blue Devils football
- Conference: Independent
- Record: 3–7
- Head coach: Sal Cintorino (4th season)
- Home stadium: Arute Field

1995 NCAA Division I-AA independents football standings
	Conf.			Overall
Team	W	L	T	W		L		T
No. 3 Troy State ^		–		11	–	1	–	0
No. 9 Hofstra ^		–		10	–	1	–	0
Saint Mary's		–		8	–	2	–	0
Wagner		–		8	–	2	–	0
Hampton		–		8	–	3	–	0
Liberty		–		8	–	3	–	0
Monmouth		–		7	–	3	–	0
Jacksonville State		–		7	–	4	–	0
Samford		–		7	–	4	–	0
Robert Morris		–		6	–	4	–	0
Towson State		–		6	–	4	–	0
UCF		–		6	–	5	–	0
UAB		–		5	–	6	–	0
Wofford		–		4	–	7	–	0
Buffalo		–		3	–	8	–	0
Youngstown State		–		3	–	8	–	0
Central Connecticut State		–		2	–	8	–	0
Western Kentucky		–		2	–	8	–	0
Davidson		–		1	–	8	–	1
Charleston Southern		–		1	–	10	–	0
Saint Francis (PA)		–		0	–	10	–	0
^ – NCAA Division I-AA playoff participant; Rankings from The Sports Network poll

The 1995 Central Connecticut State Blue Devils football team was an American football team that represented Central Connecticut State University as an independent during the 1995 NCAA Division I-AA football season. Led by fourth-year head coach Sal Cintorino, the team compiled a 3–7 record.

== Schedule ==
Date	Opponent	Site	Result	Attendance	Source
September 9	Albany	Arute Field; New Britain, CT	W 10–17 (forfeit win)		
September 16	at Connecticut	Memorial Stadium; Storrs, CT	L 9–54	11,322	
September 23	C. W. Post	Arute Field; New Britain, CT	L 0–40		
September 30	at Robert Morris	Moon Stadium; Moon Township, PA	L 3–45	3,526	
October 7	Towson State	Arute Field; New Britain, CT	L 10–24		
October 14	Siena	Arute Field; New Britain, CT	W 24–7		
October 21	at Saint Francis	Pine Bowl; Loretto, PA	W 15–13		
October 28	at Wagner	Fischer Memorial Stadium; Staten Island, NY	L 35–40		
November 4	Southern Connecticut State	Arute Field; New Britain, CT	L 3–14		
November 11	at Monmouth	Kessler Field; West Long Branch, NJ	L 13–30	1,011	
