= 1995 Saint Peter's Peacocks football team =

American college football season

1995 Saint Peter's Peacocks football
- Conference: Metro Atlantic Athletic Conference
- Record: 2–7 (2–5 MAAC)
- Head coach: Mark Collins (2nd season)
- Home stadium: Cochrane Stadium; Jaroschak Field

1995 Metro Atlantic Athletic Conference football standings
	Conf.					Overall
Team		W		L			W		L
Duquesne $	7	–	0	–	0	10	–	1	–	0
Georgetown	5	–	2	–	0	6	–	3	–	0
Marist	4	–	3	–	0	6	–	4	–	0
Canisius	4	–	3	–	0	4	–	6	–	0
St. John's	3	–	4	–	0	4	–	6	–	0
Iona	3	–	4	–	0	3	–	6	–	0
Saint Peter's	2	–	5	–	0	2	–	7	–	0
Siena	0	–	7	–	0	0	–	9	–	0
$ – Conference champion

The 1995 Saint Peter's Peacocks football team was an American football team that represented Saint Peter's College (now known as Saint Peter's University) as a member of the Metro Atlantic Athletic Conference (MAAC) during the 1995 NCAA Division I-AA football season. In their second year under head coach Mark Collins, the team compiled an overall record of 2–7, with a mark of 2–5 in conference play, and finished seventh in the MAAC.

== Schedule ==
Date	Opponent	Site	Result	Attendance	Source
September 16	Monmouth*	Cochrane Stadium; Jersey City, NJ	L 10–34	1,051	
September 23	at Siena	Heritage Park; Colonie, NY	W 25–19		
September 29	Wagner*	Cochrane Stadium; Jersey City, NJ	L 24–28		
October 7	at Duquesne	Arthur J. Rooney Athletic Field; Pittsburgh, PA	L 13–42	3,092	
October 14	at Iona	Mazzella Field; New Rochelle, NY	L 0–29		
October 21	at St. John's	DaSilva Memorial Field; Queens, NY	W 9–6		
October 28	Canisius	Cochrane Stadium; Jersey City, NJ	L 0–22	1,347	
November 4	at Marist	Leonidoff Field; Poughkeepsie, NY	L 0–38		
November 11	Georgetown	Jaroschak Field; Jersey City, NJ	L 0–29		
*Non-conference game
