= 1995 UAB Blazers football team =

American college football season

1995 UAB Blazers football
- Conference: Independent
- Record: 5–6
- Head coach: Watson Brown (1st season)
- Offensive coordinator: Rick Christophel (1st season)
- Offensive scheme: Multiple
- Defensive coordinator: Robert Henry (1st season)
- Base defense: 4–3
- Home stadium: Legion Field

1995 NCAA Division I-AA independents football standings
	Conf.			Overall
Team	W	L	T	W		L		T
No. 3 Troy State ^		–		11	–	1	–	0
No. 9 Hofstra ^		–		10	–	1	–	0
Saint Mary's		–		8	–	2	–	0
Wagner		–		8	–	2	–	0
Hampton		–		8	–	3	–	0
Liberty		–		8	–	3	–	0
Monmouth		–		7	–	3	–	0
Jacksonville State		–		7	–	4	–	0
Samford		–		7	–	4	–	0
Robert Morris		–		6	–	4	–	0
Towson State		–		6	–	4	–	0
UCF		–		6	–	5	–	0
UAB		–		5	–	6	–	0
Wofford		–		4	–	7	–	0
Buffalo		–		3	–	8	–	0
Youngstown State		–		3	–	8	–	0
Central Connecticut State		–		2	–	8	–	0
Western Kentucky		–		2	–	8	–	0
Davidson		–		1	–	8	–	1
Charleston Southern		–		1	–	10	–	0
Saint Francis (PA)		–		0	–	10	–	0
^ – NCAA Division I-AA playoff participant; Rankings from The Sports Network poll

The 1995 UAB Blazers football team represented the University of Alabama at Birmingham (UAB) in the 1995 NCAA Division I-AA football season, and was the fifth team fielded by the school. The Blazers were led by head coach was Watson Brown, in his first season as the UAB's head coach. They played their home games at Legion Field in Birmingham, Alabama and competed as a Division I-AA Independent. The Blazers finished their third and final season at the I-AA level with a record of five wins and six losses (5–6).

== Schedule ==
Date	Time	Opponent	Site	Result	Attendance	Source
September 2	3:00 p.m.	Alabama State	Legion Field; Birmingham, AL	L 3–13	15,169	
September 9	7:00 p.m.	at Southwestern Louisiana	Cajun Field; Lafayette, LA	L 21–56	17,723	
September 16	3:00 p.m.	Jacksonville State	Legion Field; Birmingham, AL	L 26–28	14,127	
September 23	7:00 p.m.	at Western Kentucky	L. T. Smith Stadium; Bowling Green, KY	L 18–32	8,000	
September 30	7:00 p.m.	at Middle Tennessee	Johnny "Red" Floyd Stadium; Murfreesboro, TN	L 13–28	10,000	
October 7	1:30 p.m.	Wofford^{†}	Legion Field; Birmingham, AL	W 28–0	8,813	
October 14	1:30 p.m.	at North Texas	Fouts Field; Denton, TX	W 19–14	16,671	
October 28	6:00 p.m.	at No. 4 Troy State	Veterans Memorial Stadium; Troy, AL	L 7–60	15,100	
November 4	1:30 p.m.	Charleston Southern	Legion Field; Birmingham, AL	W 40–14	6,500	
November 11	1:30 p.m.	Knoxville	Legion Field; Birmingham, AL	W 61–8	5,879	
November 18	1:30 p.m.	Miles	Legion Field; Birmingham, AL	W 38–7	13,781	
^{†}Homecoming; Rankings from UPI; All times are in Central time
