= 1995 Wofford Terriers football team =

American college football season

1995 Wofford Terriers football
- Conference: Independent
- Record: 4–7
- Head coach: Mike Ayers (8th season)
- Home stadium: Synder Field

1995 NCAA Division I-AA independents football standings
	Conf.			Overall
Team	W	L	T	W		L		T
No. 3 Troy State ^		–		11	–	1	–	0
No. 9 Hofstra ^		–		10	–	1	–	0
Saint Mary's		–		8	–	2	–	0
Wagner		–		8	–	2	–	0
Hampton		–		8	–	3	–	0
Liberty		–		8	–	3	–	0
Monmouth		–		7	–	3	–	0
Jacksonville State		–		7	–	4	–	0
Samford		–		7	–	4	–	0
Robert Morris		–		6	–	4	–	0
Towson State		–		6	–	4	–	0
UCF		–		6	–	5	–	0
UAB		–		5	–	6	–	0
Wofford		–		4	–	7	–	0
Buffalo		–		3	–	8	–	0
Youngstown State		–		3	–	8	–	0
Central Connecticut State		–		2	–	8	–	0
Western Kentucky		–		2	–	8	–	0
Davidson		–		1	–	8	–	1
Charleston Southern		–		1	–	10	–	0
Saint Francis (PA)		–		0	–	10	–	0
^ – NCAA Division I-AA playoff participant; Rankings from The Sports Network poll

The 1995 Wofford Terriers football team was an American football team that represented Wofford College as an independent during the 1995 NCAA Division I-AA football season. Led by eighth-year head coach Mike Ayers, the team compiled a 4–7 record.

== Schedule ==
Date	Opponent	Site	Result	Attendance	Source
September 2	at Lenoir–Rhyne	Moretz Stadium; Hickory, NC	W 23–19	3,034	
September 9	at The Citadel	Johnson Hagood Stadium; Charleston, SC (rivalry)	L 10–27	13,848	
September 16	at Furman	Paladin Stadium; Greenville, SC (rivalry)	L 0–38		
September 23	Catawba	Synder Field; Spartanburg, SC	L 20–21		
September 30	at Presbyterian	Bailey Stadium; Clinton, SC	W 21–20	4,248	
October 7	at UAB	Legion Field; Birmingham, AL	L 0–28	8,813	
October 14	Newberry	Synder Field; Spartanburg, SC	L 15–17	2,217	
October 21	at Liberty	Williams Stadium; Lynchburg, VA	L 0–37	10,300	
November 4	Elon	Synder Field; Spartanburg, SC	L 16–20	3,411	
November 11	at Charleston Southern	Buccaneer Field; North Charleston, SC	W 31–23	1,161	
November 18	Dayton	Synder Field; Spartanburg, SC	W 55–24		
