= 1995 Western Kentucky Hilltoppers football team =

American college football season

1995 Western Kentucky Hilltoppers football
- Conference: Independent
- Record: 2–8
- Head coach: Jack Harbaugh (7th season)
- Captains: Stephon Benford; Daryl Houston; Dan McGrath
- Home stadium: L. T. Smith Stadium

1995 NCAA Division I-AA independents football standings
	Conf.			Overall
Team	W	L	T	W		L		T
No. 3 Troy State ^		–		11	–	1	–	0
No. 9 Hofstra ^		–		10	–	1	–	0
Saint Mary's		–		8	–	2	–	0
Wagner		–		8	–	2	–	0
Hampton		–		8	–	3	–	0
Liberty		–		8	–	3	–	0
Monmouth		–		7	–	3	–	0
Jacksonville State		–		7	–	4	–	0
Samford		–		7	–	4	–	0
Robert Morris		–		6	–	4	–	0
Towson State		–		6	–	4	–	0
UCF		–		6	–	5	–	0
UAB		–		5	–	6	–	0
Wofford		–		4	–	7	–	0
Buffalo		–		3	–	8	–	0
Youngstown State		–		3	–	8	–	0
Central Connecticut State		–		2	–	8	–	0
Western Kentucky		–		2	–	8	–	0
Davidson		–		1	–	8	–	1
Charleston Southern		–		1	–	10	–	0
Saint Francis (PA)		–		0	–	10	–	0
^ – NCAA Division I-AA playoff participant; Rankings from The Sports Network poll

The 1995 Western Kentucky Hilltoppers football team represented Western Kentucky University as an independent during the 1995 NCAA Division I-AA football season Led by seventh-year head coach Jack Harbaugh, the Hilltoppers compiled a record of 2–8. The team's captains were Stephon Benford, Daryl Houston, and Dan McGrath.

== Schedule ==
Date	Opponent	Site	Result	Attendance	Source
August 31	Murray State	L. T. Smith Stadium; Bowling Green, KY (Battle for the Red Belt)	L 14–35	13,200	
September 9	at Eastern Kentucky	Roy Kidd Stadium; Richmond, KY (Battle of the Bluegrass)	L 14–38	18,600	
September 16	at Austin Peay	Governors Stadium; Clarksville, TN	L 34–38	4,117	
September 23	UAB*	L. T. Smith Stadium; Bowling Green, KY	W 32–18	8,000	
September 30	at No. 6 Troy State	Veterans Memorial Stadium; Troy, AL	L 39–56	11,600	
October 7	No. 25 Jacksonville State	L. T. Smith Stadium; Bowling Green, KY	W 17–15	5,500	
October 14	No. 25 Eastern Illinois^{†}	L. T. Smith Stadium; Bowling Green, KY	L 9–35	12,000	
October 21	at Indiana State	Memorial Stadium; Terre Haute, IN	L 6–27	6,142	
November 4	at Southern Illinois	McAndrew Stadium; Carbondale, IL	L 28–30	2,400	
November 18	at Liberty	Williams Stadium; Lynchburg, VA	L 36–49	1,968	
*Non-conference game; ^{†}Homecoming; Rankings from NCAA Division I-AA Football Committee Poll released prior to the game
