= 1995 Charleston Southern Buccaneers football team =

American college football season

1995 Charleston Southern Buccaneers football
- Conference: Independent
- Record: 1–10
- Head coach: David Dowd (5th season)
- Home stadium: Buccaneer Field

1995 NCAA Division I-AA independents football standings
	Conf.			Overall
Team	W	L	T	W		L		T
No. 3 Troy State ^		–		11	–	1	–	0
No. 9 Hofstra ^		–		10	–	1	–	0
Saint Mary's		–		8	–	2	–	0
Wagner		–		8	–	2	–	0
Hampton		–		8	–	3	–	0
Liberty		–		8	–	3	–	0
Monmouth		–		7	–	3	–	0
Jacksonville State		–		7	–	4	–	0
Samford		–		7	–	4	–	0
Robert Morris		–		6	–	4	–	0
Towson State		–		6	–	4	–	0
UCF		–		6	–	5	–	0
UAB		–		5	–	6	–	0
Wofford		–		4	–	7	–	0
Buffalo		–		3	–	8	–	0
Youngstown State		–		3	–	8	–	0
Central Connecticut State		–		2	–	8	–	0
Western Kentucky		–		2	–	8	–	0
Davidson		–		1	–	8	–	1
Charleston Southern		–		1	–	10	–	0
Saint Francis (PA)		–		0	–	10	–	0
^ – NCAA Division I-AA playoff participant; Rankings from The Sports Network poll

The 1995 Charleston Southern Buccaneers football team represented Charleston Southern University as an independent during the 1995 NCAA Division I-AA football season. Led by fifth-year head coach David Dowd, the Buccaneers compiled a record of 1–10. Charleston Southern played home games at Buccaneer Field in North Charleston, South Carolina.

== Schedule ==
Date	Opponent	Site	Result	Attendance	Source
September 2	at Chattanooga	Chamberlain Field; Chattanooga, TN	L 0–41	3,746	
September 9	Presbyterian	Buccaneer Field; North Charleston, SC	L 6–44		
September 16	at South Carolina State	Oliver C. Dawson Stadium; Orangeburg, SC	L 8–36	12,805	
September 23	Ferrum	Buccaneer Field; North Charleston, SC	L 6–15	1,036	
September 30	at Morehead State	Jayne Stadium; Morehead, KY	W 34–22	3,000	
October 7	at Newberry	Setzler Field; Newberry, SC	L 10–38		
October 14	No. 6 Troy State	Buccaneer Field; North Charleston, SC	L 13–66	2,131	
October 21	at No. 11 Hofstra	Hofstra Stadium; Hempstead, NY	L 6–56	2,436	
October 28	Liberty	Buccaneer Field; North Charleston, SC	L 15–19	2,401	
November 4	at UAB	Legion Field; Birmingham, AL	L 14–40	6,500	
November 11	Wofford	Buccaneer Field; North Charleston, SC	L 23–31	1,161	
Rankings from The Sports Network Poll released prior to the game
