= 1995 Davidson Wildcats football team =

American college football season

1995 Davidson Wildcats football
- Conference: Independent
- Record: 1–8–1
- Head coach: Tim Landis (3rd season)
- Home stadium: Richardson Stadium

1995 NCAA Division I-AA independents football standings
	Conf.			Overall
Team	W	L	T	W		L		T
No. 3 Troy State ^		–		11	–	1	–	0
No. 9 Hofstra ^		–		10	–	1	–	0
Saint Mary's		–		8	–	2	–	0
Wagner		–		8	–	2	–	0
Hampton		–		8	–	3	–	0
Liberty		–		8	–	3	–	0
Monmouth		–		7	–	3	–	0
Jacksonville State		–		7	–	4	–	0
Samford		–		7	–	4	–	0
Robert Morris		–		6	–	4	–	0
Towson State		–		6	–	4	–	0
UCF		–		6	–	5	–	0
UAB		–		5	–	6	–	0
Wofford		–		4	–	7	–	0
Buffalo		–		3	–	8	–	0
Youngstown State		–		3	–	8	–	0
Central Connecticut State		–		2	–	8	–	0
Western Kentucky		–		2	–	8	–	0
Davidson		–		1	–	8	–	1
Charleston Southern		–		1	–	10	–	0
Saint Francis (PA)		–		0	–	10	–	0
^ – NCAA Division I-AA playoff participant; Rankings from The Sports Network poll

The 1995 Davidson Wildcats football team was an American football team that represented Davidson College as an independent during the 1995 NCAA Division I-AA football season. Led by third-year head coach Tim Landis, the team compiled a 1–8–1 record.

== Schedule ==
Date	Opponent	Site	Result	Attendance	Source
September 9	Sewanee	Richardson Stadium; Davidson, NC	W 21–14	1,274	
September 16	Maryville (TN)	Richardson Stadium; Davidson, NC	L 21–28		
September 23	at Emory and Henry	Fullerton Field; Emory, VA	L 0–32	4,897	
September 30	at Guilford	Armfield Athletic Center; Greensboro, NC	L 28–31	3,750	
October 7	at Washington and Lee	Wilson Field; Lexington, VA	L 13–19	4,500	
October 14	Methodist	Richardson Stadium; Davidson, NC	L 14–16		
October 21	at Randolph–Macon	Day Field; Ashland, VA	L 0–36	800	
October 28	Hampden–Sydney	Richardson Stadium; Davidson, NC	L 19–22		
November 4	at Centre	Farris Stadium; Danville, KY	L 6–21		
November 11	Bridgewater	Richardson Stadium; Davidson, NC	T 7–7		
