= 1995 Buffalo Bulls football team =

American college football season

1995 Buffalo Bulls football
- Conference: Independent
- Record: 3–8
- Head coach: Craig Cirbus (1st season)
- Captain: Pete Conley
- Home stadium: University at Buffalo Stadium

1995 NCAA Division I-AA independents football standings
	Conf.			Overall
Team	W	L	T	W		L		T
No. 3 Troy State ^		–		11	–	1	–	0
No. 9 Hofstra ^		–		10	–	1	–	0
Saint Mary's		–		8	–	2	–	0
Wagner		–		8	–	2	–	0
Hampton		–		8	–	3	–	0
Liberty		–		8	–	3	–	0
Monmouth		–		7	–	3	–	0
Jacksonville State		–		7	–	4	–	0
Samford		–		7	–	4	–	0
Robert Morris		–		6	–	4	–	0
Towson State		–		6	–	4	–	0
UCF		–		6	–	5	–	0
UAB		–		5	–	6	–	0
Wofford		–		4	–	7	–	0
Buffalo		–		3	–	8	–	0
Youngstown State		–		3	–	8	–	0
Central Connecticut State		–		2	–	8	–	0
Western Kentucky		–		2	–	8	–	0
Davidson		–		1	–	8	–	1
Charleston Southern		–		1	–	10	–	0
Saint Francis (PA)		–		0	–	10	–	0
^ – NCAA Division I-AA playoff participant; Rankings from The Sports Network poll

The 1995 Buffalo Bulls football team represented the University at Buffalo as an independent during the 1995 NCAA Division I-AA football season. Led by first-year head coach Craig Cirbus, the Bulls compiled a record of 3–8. The team played home games at the University at Buffalo Stadium in Amherst, New York.

== Schedule ==
Date	Time	Opponent	Site	Result	Attendance	Source
September 2	7:00 pm	Fordham	University at Buffalo Stadium; Amherst, NY	W 49–13	7,025	
September 9	1:30 pm	Lafayette	University at Buffalo Stadium; Amherst, NY	L 17–24	3,475	
September 16	7:30 pm	at Illinois State	Hancock Stadium; Normal, IL	W 19–6	6,245	
September 23	7:00 pm	at Connecticut	Memorial Stadium; Storrs, CT	L 25–26	13,518	
September 30	7:00 pm	Villanova	University at Buffalo Stadium; Amherst, NY	L 3–28	6,759	
October 7	7:00 pm	Maine	University at Buffalo Stadium; Amherst, NY	L 6–19		
October 14	1:30 pm	UMass^{†}	University at Buffalo Stadium; Amherst, NY (rivalry)	L 9–33	5,665	
October 27	7:30 pm	at No. 9 Hofstra	Hofstra Stadium; Hempstead, NY	L 14–17	5,430	
November 4	1:30 pm	Central State (OH)	University at Buffalo Stadium; Amherst, NY	L 7–33	1,504	
November 11	1:00 pm	at Youngstown State	Stambaugh Stadium; Youngstown, OH	W 9–6	9,696	
November 18	1:30 pm	Boston University	University at Buffalo Stadium; Amherst, NY	L 40–54	1,633	
^{†}Homecoming; Rankings from The Sports Network Poll released prior to the game; All times are in Eastern time
