= 1995 Canisius Golden Griffins football team =

American college football season

1995 Canisius Golden Griffins football
- Conference: Metro Atlantic Athletic Conference
- Record: 4–6 (4–3 MAAC)
- Head coach: Chuck Williams (1st season)
- Home stadium: Demske Field

1995 Metro Atlantic Athletic Conference football standings
	Conf.					Overall
Team		W		L			W		L
Duquesne $	7	–	0	–	0	10	–	1	–	0
Georgetown	5	–	2	–	0	6	–	3	–	0
Marist	4	–	3	–	0	6	–	4	–	0
Canisius	4	–	3	–	0	4	–	6	–	0
St. John's	3	–	4	–	0	4	–	6	–	0
Iona	3	–	4	–	0	3	–	6	–	0
Saint Peter's	2	–	5	–	0	2	–	7	–	0
Siena	0	–	7	–	0	0	–	9	–	0
$ – Conference champion

The 1995 Canisius Golden Griffins football team represented Canisius College as a member of the Metro Atlantic Athletic Conference (MAAC) during the 1995 NCAA Division I-AA football season. Led by first-year head coach Chuck Williams, the Golden Griffins compiled an overall record of 4–6 with a mark of 4–3 in conference play, tying for third place in the MAAC. The Canisius offense scored 130 points while the defense allowed 176 points.

== Schedule ==
Date	Time	Opponent	Site	Result	Attendance	Source
September 7	7:00 pm	Mercyhurst*	Demske Field; Buffalo, NY	L 3–13	970	
September 16	1:00 pm	at Siena	Heritage Park; Colonie, NY	W 33–13	810	
September 23	7:00 pm	Gannon*	Demske Field; Buffalo, NY	L 12–20	837	
September 30	1:30 pm	Georgetown	Demske Field; Buffalo, NY	W 13–7	711	
October 7	1:30 pm	at Buffalo State*	Croyer Field; Buffalo, NY	L 0–31	1,407	
October 14	7:00 pm	at St. John's	DaSilva Memorial Field; Queens, NY	L 13–30		
October 21	1:30 pm	Marist	Demske Field; Buffalo, NY	L 13–34	458	
October 28	2:00 pm	at Saint Peter's	Cochrane Stadium; Jersey City, NJ	W 22–0	1,347	
November 4	1:30 pm	Iona	Demske Field; Buffalo, NY	W 21–14	357	
November 11	1:30 pm	at Duquesne	Arthur J. Rooney Athletic Field; Pittsburgh, PA	L 0–14		
*Non-conference game; All times are in Eastern time
