= 1995 Saint Francis Red Flash football team =

American college football season

1995 Saint Francis Red Flash football
- Conference: Independent
- Record: 0–10
- Head coach: Pete Mayock (1st season)
- Home stadium: Pine Bowl

1995 NCAA Division I-AA independents football standings
	Conf.			Overall
Team	W	L	T	W		L		T
No. 3 Troy State ^		–		11	–	1	–	0
No. 9 Hofstra ^		–		10	–	1	–	0
Saint Mary's		–		8	–	2	–	0
Wagner		–		8	–	2	–	0
Hampton		–		8	–	3	–	0
Liberty		–		8	–	3	–	0
Monmouth		–		7	–	3	–	0
Jacksonville State		–		7	–	4	–	0
Samford		–		7	–	4	–	0
Robert Morris		–		6	–	4	–	0
Towson State		–		6	–	4	–	0
UCF		–		6	–	5	–	0
UAB		–		5	–	6	–	0
Wofford		–		4	–	7	–	0
Buffalo		–		3	–	8	–	0
Youngstown State		–		3	–	8	–	0
Central Connecticut State		–		2	–	8	–	0
Western Kentucky		–		2	–	8	–	0
Davidson		–		1	–	8	–	1
Charleston Southern		–		1	–	10	–	0
Saint Francis (PA)		–		0	–	10	–	0
^ – NCAA Division I-AA playoff participant; Rankings from The Sports Network poll

The 1995 Saint Francis Red Flash football team represented Saint Francis College (now known as Saint Francis University) as an independent during the 1995 NCAA Division I-AA football season. Led by first-year head coach Pete Mayock, the Red Flash compiled an overall record of 0–10.

== Schedule ==
Date	Opponent	Site	Result	Attendance	Source
September 2	Gannon	Pine Bowl; Loretto, PA	L 14–29		
September 9	Duquesne	Pine Bowl; Loretto, PA	L 14–21		
September 16	Marist	Pine Bowl; Loretto, PA	L 17–20		
September 23	at Bethany (WV)	Bethany, WV	L 12–30		
October 1	at Mercyhurst	Erie, PA	L 21–57		
October 7	at Wagner	Fischer Memorial Stadium; Staten Island, NY	L 21–38		
October 14	Towson State	Pine Bowl; Loretto, PA	L 7–34	408	
October 21	Central Connecticut State	Pine Bowl; Loretto, PA	L 13–15		
October 28	Monmouth	Pine Bowl; Loretto, PA	L 0–35		
November 11	at Robert Morris	Moon Stadium; Moon Township, PA	L 6–21	1,109	
