= 1995 Saint Mary's Gaels football team =

American college football season

1995 Saint Mary's Gaels football
- Conference: Independent
- Record: 8–2
- Head coach: Mike Rasmussen (6th season)
- Home stadium: Saint Mary's Stadium

1995 NCAA Division I-AA independents football standings
	Conf.			Overall
Team	W	L	T	W		L		T
No. 3 Troy State ^		–		11	–	1	–	0
No. 9 Hofstra ^		–		10	–	1	–	0
Saint Mary's		–		8	–	2	–	0
Wagner		–		8	–	2	–	0
Hampton		–		8	–	3	–	0
Liberty		–		8	–	3	–	0
Monmouth		–		7	–	3	–	0
Jacksonville State		–		7	–	4	–	0
Samford		–		7	–	4	–	0
Robert Morris		–		6	–	4	–	0
Towson State		–		6	–	4	–	0
UCF		–		6	–	5	–	0
UAB		–		5	–	6	–	0
Wofford		–		4	–	7	–	0
Buffalo		–		3	–	8	–	0
Youngstown State		–		3	–	8	–	0
Central Connecticut State		–		2	–	8	–	0
Western Kentucky		–		2	–	8	–	0
Davidson		–		1	–	8	–	1
Charleston Southern		–		1	–	10	–	0
Saint Francis (PA)		–		0	–	10	–	0
^ – NCAA Division I-AA playoff participant; Rankings from The Sports Network poll

The 1995 Saint Mary's Gaels football team was an American football team that represented Saint Mary's College of California as an independent during the 1995 NCAA Division I-AA football season. Led by sixth-year head coach Mike Rasmussen, the team compiled a 8–2 record.

== Schedule ==
Date	Opponent	Site	Result	Attendance	Source
September 2	Sonoma State	Saint Mary's Stadium; Moraga, CA	W 59–7	2,234	
September 9	Chico State	Saint Mary’s Stadium; Moraga, CA	W 44–20	2,031	
September 16	at Weber State	Wildcat Stadium; Ogden, UT	L 14–49	10,507	
September 23	at Columbia	Wien Stadium; New York, NY	W 34–14	4,260	
September 30	at Humboldt State	Redwood Bowl; Arcata, CA	L 37–38	1,750	
October 14	UC Davis	Saint Mary's Stadium; Moraga, CA	W 33–24	4,194	
October 21	Southern Utah	Saint Mary's Stadium; Moraga, CA	W 26–24		
October 28	Cal Poly	Saint Mary's Stadium; Moraga, CA	W 31–20		
November 4	at Sacramento State	Hornet Stadium; Sacramento, CA	W 28–14	2,685	
November 11	at Cal State Northridge	North Campus Stadium; Northridge, CA	W 28–20	2,139	
