= 2001 Canisius Golden Griffins football team =

American college football season

2001 Canisius Golden Griffins football
- Conference: Metro Atlantic Athletic Conference
- Record: 1–9 (1–6 MAAC)
- Head coach: Ed Argast (2nd season)
- Home stadium: Demske Field

2001 Metro Atlantic Athletic Conference football standings
	Conf.			Overall
Team	W		L	W		L
Duquesne $	6	–	0	8	–	3
Saint Peter's	6	–	1	10	–	1
Fairfield	5	–	2	5	–	5
Iona	3	–	3	4	–	5
La Salle	2	–	4	5	–	4
Marist	2	–	4	3	–	6
Siena	1	–	6	1	–	8
Canisius	1	–	6	1	–	9
$ – Conference champion

The 2001 Canisius Golden Griffins football team represented Canisius College represented Canisius College as a member of the Metro Atlantic Athletic Conference (MAAC) during the 2001 NCAA Division I-AA football season. Led by second-year head coach Ed Argast, the Golden Griffins compiled an overall record of 1–9 with a mark of 1–6 in conference play, tying for seventh place at the bottom of the MAAC standings. The Canisius offense scored 175 points while the defense allowed 404 points.

== Schedule ==
Date	Time	Opponent	Site	Result	Attendance	Source
September 8	1:30 p.m.	Iona	Demske Field; Buffalo, NY	L 24–27	1,133	
September 15^{[a]}	2:00 p.m.	at Sacred Heart*	Campus Field; Fairfield, CT	Canceled^{[a]}		
September 22	1:00 p.m.	at La Salle	McCarthy Stadium; Philadelphia, PA	L 14–21	1,525	
September 29	1:00 p.m.	at Monmouth*	Kessler Field; West Long Branch, NJ	L 0–42	874	
October 6	4:00 p.m.	Albany*	Demske Field; Buffalo, NY	L 6–28	873	
October 13	1:00 p.m.	at Siena	Heritage Park; Colonie, NY	W 34–17	584	
October 20	1:30 p.m.	Fairfield^{†}	Demske Field; Buffalo, NY	L 44–63	1,141	
October 27	1:00 p.m.	at Dayton*	Welcome Stadium; Dayton, OH	L 18–56	5,115	
November 3	1:30 p.m.	Marist	Demske Field; Buffalo, NY	L 20–24	617	
November 10	1:00 p.m.	at Saint Peter's	Cochrane Stadium; Jersey City, NJ	L 0–63	1,800	
November 17	12:30 p.m.	at Duquesne	Arthur J. Rooney Athletic Field; Pittsburgh, PA	L 15–63	3,285	
*Non-conference game; ^{†}Homecoming; All times are in Eastern time

^{^[a]}The game between Canisius and Sacred Heart, originally scheduled for September 15th at 2:00 p.m., was canceled in the aftermath of the September 11 attacks.
