= 1997 Canisius Golden Griffins football team =

American college football season

1997 Canisius Golden Griffins football
- Conference: Metro Atlantic Athletic Conference
- Record: 3–7 (2–5 MAAC)
- Head coach: Chuck Williams (3rd season)
- Home stadium: Demske Field

1997 Metro Atlantic Athletic Conference football standings
	Conf.			Overall
Team	W		L	W		L
Georgetown $	7	–	0	8	–	3
Duquesne	6	–	1	7	–	3
Fairfield	4	–	3	7	–	3
Siena	4	–	3	6	–	3
Marist	4	–	3	6	–	4
Canisius	2	–	5	3	–	7
Saint Peter's	1	–	6	1	–	9
St. John's	0	–	0	8	–	3
Iona	0	–	7	0	–	10
$ – Conference champion

The 1997 Canisius Golden Griffins football team represented Canisius College as a member of the Metro Atlantic Athletic Conference (MAAC) during the 1997 NCAA Division I-AA football season. Led by third-year head coach Chuck Williams, the Golden Griffins compiled an overall record of 3–7 with a mark of 2–5 in conference play, placing sixth in the MAAC. The Canisius offense scored 131 points while the defense allowed 205 points.

== Schedule ==
Date	Time	Opponent	Site	TV	Result	Attendance
September 13	7:00 pm	Gannon*	Demske Field; Buffalo, NY		L 9–27	1,137
September 20	12:00 pm	at Saint Peter's	Cochrane Stadium; Jersey City, NJ		W 10–7	701
September 27	1:00 pm	at Siena	Heritage Park; Colonie, NY		L 38–41	204
October 4	3:00 pm	Iona	Demske Field; Buffalo, NY		W 14–7	511
October 11	1:30 pm	Georgetown	Demske Field; Buffalo, NY		L 10–24	471
October 18	12:00 pm	Alfred*	Demske Field; Buffalo, NY	ESN	W 23–20	1,072
October 25	1:30 pm	Fairfield	Demske Field; Buffalo, NY		L 14–21	
November 1	1:00 pm	at St. John's*	DaSilva Memorial Field; Jamaica, NY		L 0–6	409
November 8	1:30 pm	Marist	Demske Field; Buffalo, NY		L 6–20	313
November 15	12:30 pm	at Duquesne	Arthur J. Rooney Athletic Field; Pittsburgh, PA		L 7–32	1,215
*Non-conference game; All times are in Eastern time
