= 1995 Hampton Pirates football team =

American college football season

1995 Hampton Pirates football
- Conference: Independent
- Record: 8–3
- Head coach: Joe Taylor (4th season)
- Home stadium: Armstrong Stadium

1995 NCAA Division I-AA independents football standings
	Conf.			Overall
Team	W	L	T	W		L		T
No. 3 Troy State ^		–		11	–	1	–	0
No. 9 Hofstra ^		–		10	–	1	–	0
Saint Mary's		–		8	–	2	–	0
Wagner		–		8	–	2	–	0
Hampton		–		8	–	3	–	0
Liberty		–		8	–	3	–	0
Monmouth		–		7	–	3	–	0
Jacksonville State		–		7	–	4	–	0
Samford		–		7	–	4	–	0
Robert Morris		–		6	–	4	–	0
Towson State		–		6	–	4	–	0
UCF		–		6	–	5	–	0
UAB		–		5	–	6	–	0
Wofford		–		4	–	7	–	0
Buffalo		–		3	–	8	–	0
Youngstown State		–		3	–	8	–	0
Central Connecticut State		–		2	–	8	–	0
Western Kentucky		–		2	–	8	–	0
Davidson		–		1	–	8	–	1
Charleston Southern		–		1	–	10	–	0
Saint Francis (PA)		–		0	–	10	–	0
^ – NCAA Division I-AA playoff participant; Rankings from The Sports Network poll

The 1995 Hampton Pirates football team was an American football team that represented Hampton University as an independent during the 1995 NCAA Division I-AA football season. Led by fourth-year head coach Joe Taylor, the team compiled an 8–3 record.

== Schedule ==
Date	Opponent	Site	Result	Attendance	Source
September 2	at Morehouse	B. T. Harvey Stadium; Atlanta, GA	W 42–14	7,613	
September 8	at Howard	RFK Stadium; Washington, DC (rivalry)	L 22–34	25,512	
September 16	vs. Grambling State	Giants Stadium; East Rutherford, NJ (Whitney Young Memorial Classic)	W 16–7	61,023	
September 23	at No. 10 Southern	A. W. Mumford Stadium; Baton Rouge, LA	L 22–45	22,664	
September 30	vs. Bethune–Cookman	Jacksonville Municipal Stadium; Jacksonville, FL	W 34–14	8,823	
October 7	Delaware State	Armstrong Stadium; Hampton, VA	W 51–21	4,114	
October 14	at Norfolk State	Foreman Field; Norfolk, VA (rivalry)	W 23–18	23,019	
October 28	Elizabeth City State^{†}	Armstrong Stadium; Hampton, VA	W 36–13	12,240	
November 4	at Liberty	Williams Stadium; Lynchburg, VA	L 14–28		
November 11	Fayetteville State	Armstrong Stadium; Hampton, VA	W 28–7	2,034	
November 18	Morgan State	Armstrong Stadium; Hampton, VA	W 54–20	3,190	
^{†}Homecoming; Rankings from The Sports Network Poll released prior to the game
