= 1995 Samford Bulldogs football team =

American college football season

1995 Samford Bulldogs football
- Conference: Independent
- Record: 7–4
- Head coach: Pete Hurt (2nd season)
- Offensive coordinator: Roger Carr (2nd season)
- Defensive coordinator: Pete Hurt (3rd season)
- Home stadium: Seibert Stadium

1995 NCAA Division I-AA independents football standings
	Conf.			Overall
Team	W	L	T	W		L		T
No. 3 Troy State ^		–		11	–	1	–	0
No. 9 Hofstra ^		–		10	–	1	–	0
Saint Mary's		–		8	–	2	–	0
Wagner		–		8	–	2	–	0
Hampton		–		8	–	3	–	0
Liberty		–		8	–	3	–	0
Monmouth		–		7	–	3	–	0
Jacksonville State		–		7	–	4	–	0
Samford		–		7	–	4	–	0
Robert Morris		–		6	–	4	–	0
Towson State		–		6	–	4	–	0
UCF		–		6	–	5	–	0
UAB		–		5	–	6	–	0
Wofford		–		4	–	7	–	0
Buffalo		–		3	–	8	–	0
Youngstown State		–		3	–	8	–	0
Central Connecticut State		–		2	–	8	–	0
Western Kentucky		–		2	–	8	–	0
Davidson		–		1	–	8	–	1
Charleston Southern		–		1	–	10	–	0
Saint Francis (PA)		–		0	–	10	–	0
^ – NCAA Division I-AA playoff participant; Rankings from The Sports Network poll

The 1995 Samford Bulldogs football team represented Samford University as an independent during the 1995 NCAA Division I-AA football season. Led by second-year head coach Pete Hurt, the Bulldogs compiled an overall record of 7–4.

== Schedule ==
Date	Time	Opponent	Site	Result	Attendance	Source
August 31		Arkansas–Monticello	Seibert Stadium; Homewood, AL	W 24–7	4,686	
September 9		at Austin Peay	Governors Stadium; Clarksville, TN	W 42–32	5,241	
September 16		Tennessee Tech	Seibert Stadium; Homewood, AL	W 27–24	4,683	
September 30		at Nicholls State	John L. Guidry Stadium; Thibodaux, LA	W 36–20	2,503	
October 7		at No. 20 UCF	Florida Citrus Bowl; Orlando, FL	L 14–41	11,333	
October 14	6:00 p.m.	Jacksonville State	Seibert Stadium; Homewood, AL (rivalry)	L 14–35	5,400	
October 21		No. 4 Stephen F. Austin	Seibert Stadium; Homewood, AL	L 10–31	5,042	
October 28		at Alcorn State	Jack Spinks Stadium; Lorman, MS	W 20–9		
November 4		Morgan State	Seibert Stadium; Homewood, AL	W 35–24	4,128	
November 11		at Tennessee–Martin	Pacer Stadium; Martin, TN	W 21–14		
November 16		No. 3 Troy State	Seibert Stadium; Homewood, AL	L 20–50		
Rankings from The Sports Network Poll released prior to the game; All times are in Central time
