= 1995 Towson State Tigers football team =

American college football season

1995 Towson State Tigers football
- Conference: Independent
- Record: 6–4
- Head coach: Gordy Combs (4th season)
- Home stadium: Minnegan Stadium

1995 NCAA Division I-AA independents football standings
	Conf.			Overall
Team	W	L	T	W		L		T
No. 3 Troy State ^		–		11	–	1	–	0
No. 9 Hofstra ^		–		10	–	1	–	0
Saint Mary's		–		8	–	2	–	0
Wagner		–		8	–	2	–	0
Hampton		–		8	–	3	–	0
Liberty		–		8	–	3	–	0
Monmouth		–		7	–	3	–	0
Jacksonville State		–		7	–	4	–	0
Samford		–		7	–	4	–	0
Robert Morris		–		6	–	4	–	0
Towson State		–		6	–	4	–	0
UCF		–		6	–	5	–	0
UAB		–		5	–	6	–	0
Wofford		–		4	–	7	–	0
Buffalo		–		3	–	8	–	0
Youngstown State		–		3	–	8	–	0
Central Connecticut State		–		2	–	8	–	0
Western Kentucky		–		2	–	8	–	0
Davidson		–		1	–	8	–	1
Charleston Southern		–		1	–	10	–	0
Saint Francis (PA)		–		0	–	10	–	0
^ – NCAA Division I-AA playoff participant; Rankings from The Sports Network poll

The 1995 Towson State Tigers football team was an American football team that represented Towson State University (now known as Towson University) as an independent during the 1995 NCAA Division I-AA football season. Led by fourth-year head coach Gordy Combs, the team compiled a 6–4 record.

== Schedule ==
Date	Opponent	Site	Result	Attendance	Source
September 9	Butler	Minnegan Stadium; Towson, MD	W 34–3	1,437	
September 16	at Dayton	Welcome Stadium; Dayton, OH	L 0–38	3,761	
September 23	at Wagner	Fischer Memorial Stadium; Staten Island, NY	L 15–23	1,222	
September 30	Monmouth	Minnegan Stadium; Towson, MD	W 31–15		
October 7	at Central Connecticut State	Arute Field; New Britain, CT	W 24–10		
October 14	at Saint Francis (PA)	Pine Bowl; Loretto, PA	W 34–7	408	
October 21	Bucknell	Minnegan Stadium; Towson, MD	L 7–14	1,026	
October 28	Robert Morris	Minnegan Stadium; Towson, MD	W 34–14	3,558	
November 4	at American International	Miller Field; Springfield, MA	L 17–19		
November 11	Southern Connecticut State	Minnegan Stadium; Towson, MD	W 38–7	807	
