= 1995 Robert Morris Colonials football team =

American college football season

1995 Robert Morris Colonials football
- Conference: Independent
- Record: 6–4
- Head coach: Joe Walton (2nd season)
- Home stadium: Moon Stadium

1995 NCAA Division I-AA independents football standings
	Conf.			Overall
Team	W	L	T	W		L		T
No. 3 Troy State ^		–		11	–	1	–	0
No. 9 Hofstra ^		–		10	–	1	–	0
Saint Mary's		–		8	–	2	–	0
Wagner		–		8	–	2	–	0
Hampton		–		8	–	3	–	0
Liberty		–		8	–	3	–	0
Monmouth		–		7	–	3	–	0
Jacksonville State		–		7	–	4	–	0
Samford		–		7	–	4	–	0
Robert Morris		–		6	–	4	–	0
Towson State		–		6	–	4	–	0
UCF		–		6	–	5	–	0
UAB		–		5	–	6	–	0
Wofford		–		4	–	7	–	0
Buffalo		–		3	–	8	–	0
Youngstown State		–		3	–	8	–	0
Central Connecticut State		–		2	–	8	–	0
Western Kentucky		–		2	–	8	–	0
Davidson		–		1	–	8	–	1
Charleston Southern		–		1	–	10	–	0
Saint Francis (PA)		–		0	–	10	–	0
^ – NCAA Division I-AA playoff participant; Rankings from The Sports Network poll

The 1995 Robert Morris Colonials football team represented Robert Morris College, now Robert Morris University, as an independent during the 1995 NCAA Division I-AA football season. The Colonials were led by 2nd-year head coach Joe Walton and played their home games at Moon Stadium on the campus of Moon Area High School. This was the second season of the Colonials' football program's existence.

== Schedule ==
Date	Opponent	Site	Result	Attendance	Source
September 2	Waynesburg	Moon Stadium; Moon Township, PA	W 41–6	2,275	
September 9	at Monmouth	Kessler Field; West Long Branch, NJ	L 13–16	3,246	
September 16	at Duquesne	Rooney Field; Pittsburgh, PA	W 38–20	4,267	
September 30	Central Connecticut State	Moon Stadium; Moon Township, PA	W 45–3	3,526	
October 6	at Gannon	Erie Veterans Memorial Stadium; Erie, PA	L 29–30	1,668	
October 14	Wagner	Moon Stadium; Moon Township, PA	W 18–16	483	
October 21	Mercyhurst	Moon Stadium; Moon Township, PA	L 19–21	2,322	
October 28	at Towson State	Minnegan Stadium; Towson, MD	L 14–34	3,558	
November 4	at Bethany (WV)	Rine Field; Bethany, WV	W 32–7	796	
November 11	Saint Francis (PA)	Moon Stadium; Moon Township, PA	W 21–6	1,109	
