= 1995 Hofstra Flying Dutchmen football team =

American college football season

1995 Hofstra Flying Dutchmen football

NCAA Division I-AA First Round, L 17–38 at Delaware
- Conference: Independent

Ranking
- Sports Network: No. 9
- Record: 10–2
- Head coach: Joe Gardi (6th season)
- Home stadium: Hofstra Stadium

1995 NCAA Division I-AA independents football standings
	Conf.			Overall
Team	W	L	T	W		L		T
No. 3 Troy State ^		–		11	–	1	–	0
No. 9 Hofstra ^		–		10	–	1	–	0
Saint Mary's		–		8	–	2	–	0
Wagner		–		8	–	2	–	0
Hampton		–		8	–	3	–	0
Liberty		–		8	–	3	–	0
Monmouth		–		7	–	3	–	0
Jacksonville State		–		7	–	4	–	0
Samford		–		7	–	4	–	0
Robert Morris		–		6	–	4	–	0
Towson State		–		6	–	4	–	0
UCF		–		6	–	5	–	0
UAB		–		5	–	6	–	0
Wofford		–		4	–	7	–	0
Buffalo		–		3	–	8	–	0
Youngstown State		–		3	–	8	–	0
Central Connecticut State		–		2	–	8	–	0
Western Kentucky		–		2	–	8	–	0
Davidson		–		1	–	8	–	1
Charleston Southern		–		1	–	10	–	0
Saint Francis (PA)		–		0	–	10	–	0
^ – NCAA Division I-AA playoff participant; Rankings from The Sports Network poll

The 1995 Hofstra Flying Dutchmen football team was an American football team that represented Hofstra University as an independent during the 1995 NCAA Division I-AA football season. Led by sixth-year head coach Joe Gardi, the team compiled a 10–2 record. Hofstra advanced to the NCAA Division I-AA Football Championship playoffs, where the Flying Dutchmen were defeated by Delaware in the first round. The team played home games at Hofstra Stadium in Hempstead, New York.

== Schedule ==
Date	Opponent	Rank	Site	Result	Attendance	Source
September 2	Nicholls State		Hofstra Stadium; Hempstead, NY	W 34–10	4,379	
September 9	at Holy Cross		Fitton Field; Worcester, MA	W 24–9	6,614	
September 16	Lafayette		Hofstra Stadium; Hempstead, NY	W 26–0	4,372	
September 23	at Illinois State	No. 25	Hancock Stadium; Normal, IL	W 27–0	6,648	
September 29	Liberty	No. 19	Hofstra Stadium; Hempstead, NY	W 36–10	5,281	
October 7	at Sacramento State	No. 15	Hornet Stadium; Sacramento, CA	W 55–15	2,047	
October 14	at Fordham	No. 14	Coffey Field; Bronx, NY	W 36–15	1,645	
October 21	Charleston Southern	No. 11	Hofstra Stadium; Hempstead, NY	W 56–6	2,436	
October 27	Buffalo	No. 9	Hofstra Stadium; Hempstead, NY	W 17–14	5,430	
November 11	at No. 22 Rhode Island	No. 8	Meade Stadium; Kingston, RI	W 37–3	5,837	
November 18	at No. 6 Marshall	No. 7	Marshall University Stadium; Huntington, WV	L 28–30	17,080	
November 25	at No. 7 Delaware	No. 9	Delaware Stadium; Newark, DE (NCAA Division I-AA First Round)	L 17–38	13,295	
Rankings from The Sports Network Poll released prior to the game
