= 1995 Youngstown State Penguins football team =

American college football season

1995 Youngstown State Penguins football
- Conference: Independent
- Record: 3–8
- Head coach: Jim Tressel (10th season)
- Home stadium: Stambaugh Stadium

1995 NCAA Division I-AA independents football standings
| | Conf. | | | Overall |
| Team | W | L | T | W | | L | | T |
|---|---|---|---|---|---|---|---|---|
| No. 3 Troy State ^ | | – | | 11 | – | 1 | – | 0 |
| No. 9 Hofstra ^ | | – | | 10 | – | 1 | – | 0 |
| Saint Mary's | | – | | 8 | – | 2 | – | 0 |
| Wagner | | – | | 8 | – | 2 | – | 0 |
| Hampton | | – | | 8 | – | 3 | – | 0 |
| Liberty | | – | | 8 | – | 3 | – | 0 |
| Monmouth | | – | | 7 | – | 3 | – | 0 |
| Jacksonville State | | – | | 7 | – | 4 | – | 0 |
| Samford | | – | | 7 | – | 4 | – | 0 |
| Robert Morris | | – | | 6 | – | 4 | – | 0 |
| Towson State | | – | | 6 | – | 4 | – | 0 |
| UCF | | – | | 6 | – | 5 | – | 0 |
| UAB | | – | | 5 | – | 6 | – | 0 |
| Wofford | | – | | 4 | – | 7 | – | 0 |
| Buffalo | | – | | 3 | – | 8 | – | 0 |
| Youngstown State | | – | | 3 | – | 8 | – | 0 |
| Central Connecticut State | | – | | 2 | – | 8 | – | 0 |
| Western Kentucky | | – | | 2 | – | 8 | – | 0 |
| Davidson | | – | | 1 | – | 8 | – | 1 |
| Charleston Southern | | – | | 1 | – | 10 | – | 0 |
| Saint Francis (PA) | | – | | 0 | – | 10 | – | 0 |
^ – NCAA Division I-AA playoff participant; Rankings from The Sports Network poll

The 1995 Youngstown State Penguins football team was an American football team that represented Youngstown State University as an independent during the 1995 NCAA Division I-AA football season. Led by 10th-year head coach Jim Tressel, the team compiled a 3–8 record.

== Schedule ==
| Date | Time | Opponent | Rank | Site | Result | Attendance | Source |
|---|---|---|---|---|---|---|---|
| September 2 | 1:00 p.m. | at Kent State | No. 1 | Dix Stadium; Kent, OH | L 14–17 | 17,516 | |
| September 9 | | No. 8 Stephen F. Austin | No. 6 | Stambaugh Stadium; Youngstown, OH | L 0–27 | | |
| September 16 | | Slippery Rock | No. 15 | Stambaugh Stadium; Youngstown, OH | W 28–12 | 15,007 | |
| September 23 | | at No. 1 McNeese State | No. 14 | Cowboy Stadium; Lake Charles, LA | L 3–31 | 20,290 | |
| October 7 | | at No. 9 Delaware | | Delaware Stadium; Newark, DE | L 13–34 | 16,459 | |
| October 14 | | Central Michigan | | Stambaugh Stadium; Youngstown, OH | L 25–46 | 15,166 | |
| October 21 | | Wingate | | Stambaugh Stadium; Youngstown, OH | W 56–7 | | |
| October 28 | 1:00 p.m. | No. 22 Indiana State | | Stambaugh Stadium; Youngstown, OH | L 6–13 | 10,286 | |
| November 4 | | at Akron | | Rubber Bowl; Akron, OH (rivalry) | W 24–10 | | |
| November 11 | 1:00 p.m. | Buffalo | | Stambaugh Stadium; Youngstown, OH | L 6–9 | 9,696 | |
| November 18 | | Illinois State | | Stambaugh Stadium; Youngstown, OH | L 13–30 | | |
Rankings from The Sports Network Poll released prior to the game; All times are in Eastern time
