= 1995 Georgetown Hoyas football team =

American college football season

1995 Georgetown Hoyas football
- Conference: Metro Atlantic Athletic Conference
- Record: 6–3 (5–2 MAAC)
- Head coach: Bob Benson (3rd season)
- Home stadium: Kehoe Field

1995 Metro Atlantic Athletic Conference football standings
	Conf.					Overall
Team		W		L			W		L
Duquesne $	7	–	0	–	0	10	–	1	–	0
Georgetown	5	–	2	–	0	6	–	3	–	0
Marist	4	–	3	–	0	6	–	4	–	0
Canisius	4	–	3	–	0	4	–	6	–	0
St. John's	3	–	4	–	0	4	–	6	–	0
Iona	3	–	4	–	0	3	–	6	–	0
Saint Peter's	2	–	5	–	0	2	–	7	–	0
Siena	0	–	7	–	0	0	–	9	–	0
$ – Conference champion

The 1995 Georgetown Hoyas football team was an American football team that represented Georgetown University as a member of the Metro Atlantic Athletic Conference (MAAC) during the 1995 NCAA Division I-AA football season. In their third year under head coach Bob Benson, the team compiled an overall record of 6–3, with a mark of 5–2 in conference play, and finished second in the MAAC.

== Schedule ==
Date	Opponent	Site	Result	Attendance	Source
September 16	at Iona	Mazzella Field; New Rochelle, NY	W 27–14		
September 23	Duquesne	Kehoe Field; Washington, DC	L 7–13		
September 30	at Canisius	Demske Field; Buffalo, NY	L 7–13	711	
October 7	St. John's	Kehoe Field; Washington, DC	W 41–13	1,351	
October 14	Franklin & Marshall*	Kehoe Field; Washington, DC	W 31–7		
October 20	at Johns Hopkins*	Homewood Field; Baltimore, MD	L 3–7	2,226	
October 28	at Marist	Leonidoff Field; Poughkeepsie, NY	W 14–13		
November 4	Siena	Kehoe Field; Washington, DC	W 33–19		
November 11	at Saint Peter's	Jaroschak Field; Jersey City, NJ	W 29–0		
*Non-conference game
