= 1995 Duquesne Dukes football team =

American college football season

1995 Duquesne Dukes football

MAAC champion

ECAC–Division I-AA Bowl, W 44–20 vs. Wagner
- Conference: Metro Atlantic Athletic Conference
- Record: 10–1 (7–0 MAAC)
- Head coach: Greg Gattuso (3rd season)
- Home stadium: Arthur J. Rooney Athletic Field

1995 Metro Atlantic Athletic Conference football standings
	Conf.					Overall
Team		W		L			W		L
Duquesne $	7	–	0	–	0	10	–	1	–	0
Georgetown	5	–	2	–	0	6	–	3	–	0
Marist	4	–	3	–	0	6	–	4	–	0
Canisius	4	–	3	–	0	4	–	6	–	0
St. John's	3	–	4	–	0	4	–	6	–	0
Iona	3	–	4	–	0	3	–	6	–	0
Saint Peter's	2	–	5	–	0	2	–	7	–	0
Siena	0	–	7	–	0	0	–	9	–	0
$ – Conference champion

The 1995 Duquesne Dukes football team represented Duquesne University as a member of the Metro Atlantic Athletic Conference (MAAC) during the 1995 NCAA Division I-AA football season. Led by third-year head coach Greg Gattuso, the team compiled an overall record of 10–1, with a mark of 7–0 in conference play, and finished as MAAC champion.

== Schedule ==
Date	Opponent	Site	Result	Attendance	Source
September 9	at Saint Francis (PA)*	Pine Bowl; Loretto, PA	W 21–14		
September 16	Robert Morris*	Arthur J. Rooney Athletic Field; Pittsburgh, PA	L 20–38	4,267	
September 23	at Georgetown	Kehoe Field; Washington, DC	W 13–7		
September 30	at Gannon*	Erie Veterans Memorial Stadium; Erie, PA	W 44–19		
October 7	Saint Peter's	Arthur J. Rooney Athletic Field; Pittsburgh, PA	W 42–13	3,092	
October 14	at Marist	Leonidoff Field; Poughkeepsie, NY	W 16–14		
October 21	Siena	Arthur J. Rooney Athletic Field; Pittsburgh, PA	W 21–7		
October 28	at Iona	Mazzella Field; New Rochelle, NY	W 30–13		
November 4	St. John's	Arthur J. Rooney Athletic Field; Pittsburgh, PA	W 48–22	2,340	
November 11	Canisius	Arthur J. Rooney Athletic Field; Pittsburgh, PA	W 14–0		
November 18	Wagner*	Arthur J. Rooney Athletic Field; Pittsburgh, PA (ECAC Division I-AA Bowl)	W 44–20		
*Non-conference game
