= 1995 Marist Red Foxes football team =

American college football season

1995 Marist Red Foxes football
- Conference: Metro Atlantic Athletic Conference
- Record: 6–4 (4–3 MAAC)
- Head coach: Jim Parady (4th season)
- Home stadium: Leonidoff Field

1995 Metro Atlantic Athletic Conference football standings
	Conf.					Overall
Team		W		L			W		L
Duquesne $	7	–	0	–	0	10	–	1	–	0
Georgetown	5	–	2	–	0	6	–	3	–	0
Marist	4	–	3	–	0	6	–	4	–	0
Canisius	4	–	3	–	0	4	–	6	–	0
St. John's	3	–	4	–	0	4	–	6	–	0
Iona	3	–	4	–	0	3	–	6	–	0
Saint Peter's	2	–	5	–	0	2	–	7	–	0
Siena	0	–	7	–	0	0	–	9	–	0
$ – Conference champion

The 1995 Marist Red Foxes football team was an American football team that represented Marist College as a member of the Metro Atlantic Athletic Conference (MAAC) during the 1995 NCAA Division I-AA football season. Led by third-year head coach Jim Parady, the team compiled an overall record of 6–4, with a mark of 4–3 in conference play, and finished tied for third in the MAAC.

== Schedule ==
Date	Opponent	Site	Result	Attendance	Source
September 2	Monmouth*	Leonidoff Field; Poughkeepsie, NY	W 16–15	1,969	
September 9	at Fordham*	Coffey Field; Bronx, NY	L 0–46	2,478	
September 16	at Saint Francis (PA)*	Pine Bowl; Loretto, PA	W 20–17		
September 29	at St. John's	DaSilva Memorial Field; Queens, NY	W 36–29		
October 7	at Iona	Mazzella Field; New Rochelle, NY	L 14–18	1,072	
October 14	Duquesne	Leonidoff Field; Poughkeepsie, NY	L 14–16		
October 21	at Canisius	Demske Field; Buffalo, NY	W 34–13	458	
October 28	Georgetown	Leonidoff Field; Poughkeepsie, NY	L 13–14		
November 4	Saint Peter's	Leonidoff Field; Poughkeepsie, NY	W 38–0		
November 11	Siena	Leonidoff Field; Poughkeepsie, NY	W 49–6		
*Non-conference game
