= 1995 Liberty Flames football team =

American college football season

1995 Liberty Flames football
- Conference: Independent
- Record: 8–3
- Head coach: Sam Rutigliano (7th season)
- Offensive coordinator: Bob Leahy (7th season)
- Defensive coordinator: George MacIntyre (1st season)
- Home stadium: Williams Stadium

1995 NCAA Division I-AA independents football standings
	Conf.			Overall
Team	W	L	T	W		L		T
No. 3 Troy State ^		–		11	–	1	–	0
No. 9 Hofstra ^		–		10	–	1	–	0
Saint Mary's		–		8	–	2	–	0
Wagner		–		8	–	2	–	0
Hampton		–		8	–	3	–	0
Liberty		–		8	–	3	–	0
Monmouth		–		7	–	3	–	0
Jacksonville State		–		7	–	4	–	0
Samford		–		7	–	4	–	0
Robert Morris		–		6	–	4	–	0
Towson State		–		6	–	4	–	0
UCF		–		6	–	5	–	0
UAB		–		5	–	6	–	0
Wofford		–		4	–	7	–	0
Buffalo		–		3	–	8	–	0
Youngstown State		–		3	–	8	–	0
Central Connecticut State		–		2	–	8	–	0
Western Kentucky		–		2	–	8	–	0
Davidson		–		1	–	8	–	1
Charleston Southern		–		1	–	10	–	0
Saint Francis (PA)		–		0	–	10	–	0
^ – NCAA Division I-AA playoff participant; Rankings from The Sports Network poll

The 1995 Liberty Flames football team represented Liberty University as an independent during the 1995 NCAA Division I-AA football season. Led by seventh-year head coach Sam Rutigliano, the Flames compiled an overall record of 8–3.

== Schedule ==
Date	Opponent	Rank	Site	Result	Attendance	Source
September 2	West Virginia Tech	No. 21	Williams Stadium; Lynchburg, VA	W 76–6	11,000	
September 9	at VMI	No. 20	Alumni Memorial Field; Lexington, VA	L 31–50	7,211	
September 16	Morgan State		Williams Stadium; Lynchburg, VA	W 48–19	3,252	
September 23	at Delaware State		Alumni Stadium; Dover, DE	W 41–14		
September 29	at No. 19 Hofstra		Hofstra Stadium; Hempstead, NY	L 10–36	5,281	
October 14	at No. 19 UCF		Florida Citrus Bowl; Orlando, FL	W 7–6	12,210	
October 21	Wofford		Williams Stadium; Lynchburg, VA	W 37–0	10,300	
October 28	at Charleston Southern		Buccaneer Field; North Charleston, SC	W 19–15	2,401	
November 4	Hampton		Williams Stadium; Lynchburg, VA	W 28–14		
November 11	No. 21 Georgia Southern		Williams Stadium; Lynchburg, VA	L 6–7	3,325	
November 18	Western Kentucky		Williams Stadium; Lynchburg, VA	W 49–36	1,968	
Rankings from NCAA Division I-AA Football Committee Poll released prior to the game
