= 1995 Jacksonville State Gamecocks football team =

American college football season

1995 Jacksonville State Gamecocks football
- Conference: Independent
- Record: 7–4
- Head coach: Bill Burgess (11th season)
- Offensive coordinator: Charles Maniscalco (11th season)
- Defensive coordinator: Roland Houston (4th season)
- Home stadium: Paul Snow Stadium

1995 NCAA Division I-AA independents football standings
	Conf.			Overall
Team	W	L	T	W		L		T
No. 3 Troy State ^		–		11	–	1	–	0
No. 9 Hofstra ^		–		10	–	1	–	0
Saint Mary's		–		8	–	2	–	0
Wagner		–		8	–	2	–	0
Hampton		–		8	–	3	–	0
Liberty		–		8	–	3	–	0
Monmouth		–		7	–	3	–	0
Jacksonville State		–		7	–	4	–	0
Samford		–		7	–	4	–	0
Robert Morris		–		6	–	4	–	0
Towson State		–		6	–	4	–	0
UCF		–		6	–	5	–	0
UAB		–		5	–	6	–	0
Wofford		–		4	–	7	–	0
Buffalo		–		3	–	8	–	0
Youngstown State		–		3	–	8	–	0
Central Connecticut State		–		2	–	8	–	0
Western Kentucky		–		2	–	8	–	0
Davidson		–		1	–	8	–	1
Charleston Southern		–		1	–	10	–	0
Saint Francis (PA)		–		0	–	10	–	0
^ – NCAA Division I-AA playoff participant; Rankings from The Sports Network poll

The 1995 Jacksonville State Gamecocks football team represented Jacksonville State University as an independent during the 1995 NCAA Division I-AA football season.Led by 11th-year head coach Bill Burgess, the Gamecocks compiled a record of 7–4. Jacksonville State played home games at Paul Snow Stadium in Jacksonville, Alabama.

== Schedule ==
Date	Time	Opponent	Rank	Site	Result	Attendance	Source
September 2	7:00 pm	at Sam Houston State		Bowers Stadium; Huntsville, TX	W 16–13	5,913	
September 9	7:00 pm	West Georgia		Paul Snow Stadium; Jacksonville, AL	W 25–22	13,211	
September 16	1:30 pm	at UAB		Legion Field; Birmingham, AL	W 28–26	14,127	
September 23	7:00 pm	North Carolina A&T		Paul Snow Stadium; Jacksonville, AL	W 21–10	8,468	
September 30	2:00 pm	Knoxville		Paul Snow Stadium; Jacksonville, AL	W 56–6	13,983	
October 7	7:00 pm	at Western Kentucky	No. 25	L. T. Smith Stadium; Bowling Green, KY	L 15–17	5,500	
October 14	6:00 pm	at Samford		Seibert Stadium; Homewood, AL (rivalry)	W 35–14	5,400	
October 21	6:00 pm	at No. 4 Troy State	No. 24	Veterans Memorial Stadium; Troy, AL (rivalry)	L 7–35	15,500	
October 28	2:00 pm	at Arkansas State	No. 24	Indian Stadium; Jonesboro, AR	L 6–37	8,595	
November 11	2:00 pm	Western Illinois		Paul Snow Stadium; Jacksonville, AL	W 32–27	7,152	
November 18	1:30 pm	at Southwest Missouri State		Plaster Sports Complex; Springfield, MO	L 14–49	5,004	
Rankings from The Sports Network Poll released prior to the game; All times are in Central time
