= 1995 St. John's Red Storm football team =

American college football season

1995 St. John's Red Storm football
- Conference: Metro Atlantic Athletic Conference
- Record: 4–6 (3–4 MAAC)
- Head coach: Bob Ricca (18th season)
- Home stadium: DaSilva Memorial Field

1995 Metro Atlantic Athletic Conference football standings
	Conf.					Overall
Team		W		L			W		L
Duquesne $	7	–	0	–	0	10	–	1	–	0
Georgetown	5	–	2	–	0	6	–	3	–	0
Marist	4	–	3	–	0	6	–	4	–	0
Canisius	4	–	3	–	0	4	–	6	–	0
St. John's	3	–	4	–	0	4	–	6	–	0
Iona	3	–	4	–	0	3	–	6	–	0
Saint Peter's	2	–	5	–	0	2	–	7	–	0
Siena	0	–	7	–	0	0	–	9	–	0
$ – Conference champion

The 1995 St. John's Red Storm football team was an American football team that represented St. John's University as a member of the Metro Atlantic Athletic Conference (MAAC) during the 1995 NCAA Division I-AA football season. In their 18th year under head coach Bob Ricca, the team compiled an overall record of 4–6, with a mark of 3–4 in conference play, and finished tied for fifth in the MAAC.

== Schedule ==
Date	Opponent	Site	Result	Attendance	Source
September 16	at Pace*	Finnerty Field; Pleasantville, NY	L 7–17		
September 23	at Monmouth*	Kessler Field; West Long Branch, NJ	L 0–47	3,089	
September 29	Marist	DaSilva Memorial Field; Queens, NY	L 29–36		
October 7	at Georgetown	Kehoe Field; Washington, DC	L 13–41	1,351	
October 14	Canisius	DaSilva Memorial Field; Queens, NY	W 30–13		
October 21	Saint Peter's	DaSilva Memorial Field; Queens, NY	L 6–9		
October 28	at Siena	Heritage Park; Colonie, NY	W 22–21		
November 4	at Duquesne	Arthur J. Rooney Athletic Field; Pittsburgh, PA	L 22–48	2,340	
November 10	Iona	DaSilva Memorial Field; Queens, NY	W 17–13	1,508	
November 23	Sacred Heart*	DaSilva Memorial Field; Queens, NY	W 35–20		
*Non-conference game
