= 1995 Troy State Trojans football team =

American college football season

1995 Troy State Trojans football

NCAA Division I-AA First Round, L 21–24 vs. Georgia Southern
- Conference: Independent

Ranking
- Sports Network: No. 3
- Record: 11–1
- Head coach: Larry Blakeney (5th season)
- Offensive coordinator: Don Jacobs (5th season)
- Defensive coordinator: Steve Davis (1st season)
- Home stadium: Veterans Memorial Stadium

1995 NCAA Division I-AA independents football standings
	Conf.			Overall
Team	W	L	T	W		L		T
No. 3 Troy State ^		–		11	–	1	–	0
No. 9 Hofstra ^		–		10	–	1	–	0
Saint Mary's		–		8	–	2	–	0
Wagner		–		8	–	2	–	0
Hampton		–		8	–	3	–	0
Liberty		–		8	–	3	–	0
Monmouth		–		7	–	3	–	0
Jacksonville State		–		7	–	4	–	0
Samford		–		7	–	4	–	0
Robert Morris		–		6	–	4	–	0
Towson State		–		6	–	4	–	0
UCF		–		6	–	5	–	0
UAB		–		5	–	6	–	0
Wofford		–		4	–	7	–	0
Buffalo		–		3	–	8	–	0
Youngstown State		–		3	–	8	–	0
Central Connecticut State		–		2	–	8	–	0
Western Kentucky		–		2	–	8	–	0
Davidson		–		1	–	8	–	1
Charleston Southern		–		1	–	10	–	0
Saint Francis (PA)		–		0	–	10	–	0
^ – NCAA Division I-AA playoff participant; Rankings from The Sports Network poll

The 1995 Troy State Trojans football team represented Troy State University—now known as Troy University—as an independent during the 1995 NCAA Division I-AA football season. Led by fifth-year head coach Larry Blakeney, the Trojans compiled a record of 11–1. After the first undefeated regular season in program history, Troy State advanced to the NCAA Division I-AA Football Championship playoffs for the third consecutive season, but lost to Georgia Southern in the first round. The Trojans were ranked No. 3 in the final Sports Network poll. The team played home games at Veterans Memorial Stadium in Troy, Alabama.

== Schedule ==
Date	Opponent	Rank	Site	Result	Attendance	Source
August 31	East Tennessee State	No. 15	Veterans Memorial Stadium; Troy, AL	W 31–7	9,321	
September 9	Northwestern State	No. 9	Veterans Memorial Stadium; Troy, AL	W 34–17	6,300	
September 16	at Nicholls State	No. 8	John L. Guidry Stadium; Thibodaux, LA	W 17–3		
September 23	at Alabama State	No. 7	Cramton Bowl; Montgomery, AL	W 28–10		
September 30	at Western Kentucky	No. 6	L. T. Smith Stadium; Bowling Green, KY	W 56–39	11,600	
October 7	at Northeast Louisiana	No. 6	Malone Stadium; Monroe, LA	W 20–10	19,267	
October 14	at Charleston Southern	No. 6	Buccaneer Field; North Charleston, SC	W 66–13	2,131	
October 21	No. 24 Jacksonville State	No. 5	Veterans Memorial Stadium; Troy, AL (rivalry)	W 35–7	15,500	
October 28	UAB^{†}	No. 4	Veterans Memorial Stadium; Troy, AL	W 60–7	15,100	
November 11	at UCF	No. 3	Florida Citrus Bowl; Orlando, FL	W 35–14	12,312	
November 16	at Samford	No. 3	Seibert Stadium; Homewood, AL	W 50–20		
November 25	No. 15 Georgia Southern	No. 3	Veterans Memorial Stadium; Troy, AL (NCAA Division I-AA First Round)	L 21–24	6,000	
^{†}Homecoming; Rankings from The Sports Network Poll released prior to the game
