= 1995 UCF Golden Knights football team =

American college football season

1995 UCF Golden Knights football
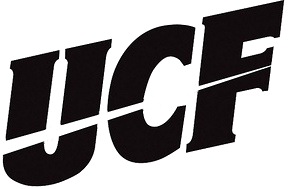
- Conference: Independent
- Record: 6–5
- Head coach: Gene McDowell (11th season)
- Offensive coordinator: Mike Kruczek (11th season)
- Defensive coordinator: Willie Martinez (1st season)
- Home stadium: Florida Citrus Bowl

1995 NCAA Division I-AA independents football standings
	Conf.			Overall
Team	W	L	T	W		L		T
No. 3 Troy State ^		–		11	–	1	–	0
No. 9 Hofstra ^		–		10	–	1	–	0
Saint Mary's		–		8	–	2	–	0
Wagner		–		8	–	2	–	0
Hampton		–		8	–	3	–	0
Liberty		–		8	–	3	–	0
Monmouth		–		7	–	3	–	0
Jacksonville State		–		7	–	4	–	0
Samford		–		7	–	4	–	0
Robert Morris		–		6	–	4	–	0
Towson State		–		6	–	4	–	0
UCF		–		6	–	5	–	0
UAB		–		5	–	6	–	0
Wofford		–		4	–	7	–	0
Buffalo		–		3	–	8	–	0
Youngstown State		–		3	–	8	–	0
Central Connecticut State		–		2	–	8	–	0
Western Kentucky		–		2	–	8	–	0
Davidson		–		1	–	8	–	1
Charleston Southern		–		1	–	10	–	0
Saint Francis (PA)		–		0	–	10	–	0
^ – NCAA Division I-AA playoff participant; Rankings from The Sports Network poll

The 1995 UCF Golden Knights football season was the seventeenth season for the team and eleventh for Gene McDowell as the head coach of the Golden Knights. The team finished with a 6–5 overall record. The season marked UCF's last in Division I-AA, as the Golden Knights moved to Division I-A in 1996. The 1995 season also featured the debut of UCF's new freshman quarterback, Daunte Culpepper.

The season started out on a high note, as the Golden Knights defeated Div. I-AA #5 Eastern Kentucky behind 254 yards passing by Culpepper in his first career game. After the season, Marquette Smith was drafted by the Carolina Panthers.

Marc Daniels debuted as the new radio voice of the Knights on the UCF Radio Network.

== Schedule ==
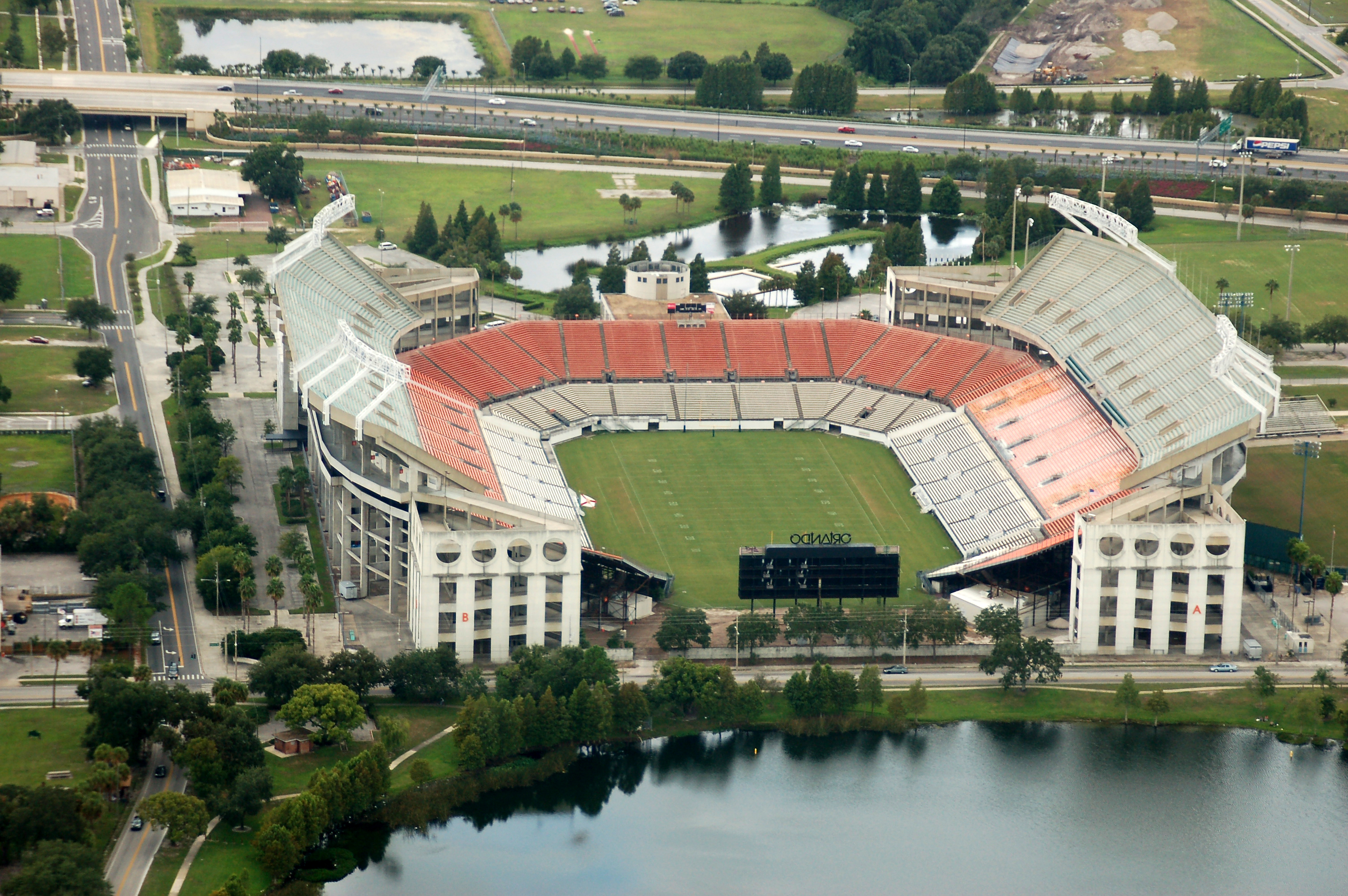
The Florida Citrus Bowl, the Knights' home field

Date	Opponent	Rank	Site	Result	Attendance	Source
August 31	No. 5 Eastern Kentucky		Florida Citrus Bowl; Orlando, FL	W 40–32	13,442	
September 9	No. 8 (D-II) Carson–Newman	No. 21	Florida Citrus Bowl; Orlando, FL	W 35–21	13,413	
September 23	at No. 1 (I-A) Florida State	No. 12	Doak Campbell Stadium; Tallahassee, FL	L 14–46	76,600	
September 30	at No. 1 McNeese State	No. 12	Cowboy Stadium; Lake Charles, LA	L 7–49	16,921	
October 7	Samford	No. 20	Florida Citrus Bowl; Orlando, FL	W 41–14	11,333	
October 14	Liberty	No. 19	Florida Citrus Bowl; Orlando, FL	L 6–7	12,210	
October 21	at Hawaii		Aloha Stadium; Halawa, HI	L 14–45	31,463	
October 28	at Northeast Louisiana		Malone Stadium; Monroe, LA	W 34–14	16,808	
November 4	Bethune–Cookman^{†}		Florida Citrus Bowl; Orlando, FL	W 38–7	16,002	
November 11	No. 3 Troy State		Florida Citrus Bowl; Orlando, FL	L 17–28	12,312	
November 18	Maine		Florida Citrus Bowl; Orlando, FL	W 37–17	11,119	
^{†}Homecoming; Rankings from The Sports Network Poll released prior to the game
