= 1995 Iona Gaels football team =

American college football season

1995 Iona Gaels football
- Conference: Metro Atlantic Athletic Conference
- Record: 3–6 (3–4 MAAC)
- Head coach: Harold Crocker (11th season)
- Home stadium: Mazzella Field

1995 Metro Atlantic Athletic Conference football standings
	Conf.					Overall
Team		W		L			W		L
Duquesne $	7	–	0	–	0	10	–	1	–	0
Georgetown	5	–	2	–	0	6	–	3	–	0
Marist	4	–	3	–	0	6	–	4	–	0
Canisius	4	–	3	–	0	4	–	6	–	0
St. John's	3	–	4	–	0	4	–	6	–	0
Iona	3	–	4	–	0	3	–	6	–	0
Saint Peter's	2	–	5	–	0	2	–	7	–	0
Siena	0	–	7	–	0	0	–	9	–	0
$ – Conference champion

The 1995 Iona Gaels football team was an American football team that represented Iona College (now known as Iona University) as a member of the Metro Atlantic Athletic Conference (MAAC) during the 1995 NCAA Division I-AA football season. In their 11th year under head coach Harold Crocker, the team compiled an overall record of 3–6, with a mark of 3–4 in conference play, and finished tied for fifth in the MAAC.

== Schedule ==
Date	Opponent	Site	Result	Attendance	Source
September 16	Georgetown	Mazzella Field; New Rochelle, NY	L 14–27		
September 23	Pace*	Mazzella Field; New Rochelle, NY	L 22–29	1,071	
September 30	at Siena	Heritage Park; Colonie, NY	W 18–6		
October 7	Marist	Mazzella Field; New Rochelle, NY	W 18–14	1,072	
October 14	Saint Peter's	Mazzella Field; New Rochelle, NY	W 29–0		
October 21	at Wagner*	Fischer Memorial Stadium; Staten Island, NY	L 0–42		
October 28	Duquesne	Mazzella Field; New Rochelle, NY	L 13–30		
November 4	at Canisius	Demske Field; Buffalo, NY	L 14–21	357	
November 10	at St. John's	DaSilva Memorial Field; Queens, NY	L 13–17	1,508	
*Non-conference game
