= 1995 NCAA Division I-AA football season =

American college football season

1995 NCAA Division I-AA season

Regular season
- Number of teams: 119
- Duration: August–November
- Payton Award: Dave Dickenson (QB, Montana)
- Buchanan Award: Dexter Coakley (LB, Appalachian State)

Playoff
- Duration: November 25–December 16
- Championship date: December 16, 1995
- Championship site: Marshall University Stadium; Huntington, West Virginia
- Champion: Montana

NCAA Division I-AA football seasons
- «1994 1996»

The 1995 NCAA Division I-AA football season, part of college football in the United States organized by the National Collegiate Athletic Association at the Division I-AA level, began in August 1995, and concluded with the 1995 NCAA Division I-AA Football Championship Game on December 16, 1995, at Marshall University Stadium in Huntington, West Virginia. The Montana Grizzlies won their first I-AA championship, defeating the Marshall Thundering Herd by a score of 22−20.

== Conference changes and new programs ==
One team upgraded to Division I-A and three new programs upgraded from Division II.

School	1994 Conference	1995 Conference
Hampton	CIAA (II)	I-AA Independent
Jacksonville State	D-II Independent	I-AA Independent
North Texas	Southland (I-AA)	I-A Independent
Wofford	D-II Independent	I-AA Independent

== Conference standings ==
1995 American West Conference football standings
	Conf.					Overall
Team	W		L		T	W		L		T
Sacramento State $	3	–	0	–	0	4	–	6	–	1
Cal Poly	2	–	1	–	0	5	–	6	–	0
Cal State Northridge	1	–	2	–	0	2	–	8	–	0
Southern Utah	0	–	3	–	0	2	–	9	–	0
$ – Conference champion

1995 Big Sky Conference football standings
	Conf.					Overall
Team	W		L		T	W		L		T
No. 8 Montana $^	6	–	1	–	0	13	–	2	–	0
No. 21 Boise State	4	–	3	–	0	7	–	4	–	0
No. 22 Northern Arizona	4	–	3	–	0	7	–	4	–	0
No. 17 Idaho ^	4	–	3	–	0	6	–	5	–	0
Weber State	4	–	3	–	0	6	–	5	–	0
Idaho State	3	–	4	–	0	6	–	5	–	0
Montana State	2	–	5	–	0	5	–	6	–	0
Eastern Washington	1	–	6	–	0	3	–	8	–	0
$ – Conference champion; ^ – NCAA Division I-AA playoff participant; Rankings from The Sports Network poll

1995 Gateway Football Conference standings
	Conf.					Overall
Team	W		L		T	W		L		T
No. 12 Eastern Illinois +^	5	–	1	–	0	10	–	2	–	0
No. 18 Northern Iowa +^	5	–	1	–	0	8	–	5	–	0
No. 24 Indiana State	3	–	3	–	0	7	–	4	–	0
Illinois State	3	–	3	–	0	5	–	6	–	0
Southern Illinois	2	–	4	–	0	5	–	6	–	0
Western Illinois	2	–	4	–	0	4	–	7	–	0
Southwest Missouri State	1	–	5	–	0	4	–	7	–	0
$ – Conference champion; ^ – NCAA Division I-AA playoff participant; Rankings from The Sports Network poll

1995 Ivy League football standings
	Conf.					Overall
Team	W		L		T	W		L		T
Princeton $	5	–	1	–	1	8	–	1	–	1
Penn	5	–	2	–	0	7	–	3	–	0
Cornell	5	–	2	–	0	6	–	4	–	0
Dartmouth	4	–	2	–	1	7	–	2	–	1
Columbia	3	–	4	–	0	3	–	6	–	1
Brown	2	–	5	–	0	5	–	5	–	0
Yale	2	–	5	–	0	3	–	7	–	0
Harvard	1	–	6	–	0	2	–	8	–	0
$ – Conference champion

1995 Metro Atlantic Athletic Conference football standings
	Conf.					Overall
Team		W		L			W		L
Duquesne $	7	–	0	–	0	10	–	1	–	0
Georgetown	5	–	2	–	0	6	–	3	–	0
Marist	4	–	3	–	0	6	–	4	–	0
Canisius	4	–	3	–	0	4	–	6	–	0
St. John's	3	–	4	–	0	4	–	6	–	0
Iona	3	–	4	–	0	3	–	6	–	0
Saint Peter's	2	–	5	–	0	2	–	7	–	0
Siena	0	–	7	–	0	0	–	9	–	0
$ – Conference champion

1995 Mid-Eastern Athletic Conference football standings
	Conf.					Overall
Team	W		L		T	W		L		T
No. 16 Florida A&M $	6	–	0	–	0	9	–	3	–	0
Delaware State	5	–	1	–	0	6	–	5	–	0
South Carolina State	4	–	2	–	0	6	–	4	–	0
Howard	2	–	4	–	0	6	–	5	–	0
North Carolina A&T	2	–	4	–	0	4	–	7	–	0
Bethune–Cookman	2	–	4	–	0	3	–	8	–	0
Morgan State	0	–	6	–	0	1	–	10	–	0
$ – Conference champion; Rankings from The Sports Network poll

1995 Ohio Valley Conference football standings
	Conf.					Overall
Team	W		L		T	W		L		T
No. 4 Murray State $^	8	–	0	–	0	11	–	1	–	0
No. 10 Eastern Kentucky ^	7	–	1	–	0	9	–	3	–	0
No. 25 Middle Tennessee	6	–	2	–	0	7	–	4	–	0
Southeast Missouri State	5	–	3	–	0	5	–	6	–	0
Tennessee–Martin	4	–	4	–	0	5	–	6	–	0
Austin Peay	2	–	6	–	0	3	–	8	–	0
Tennessee Tech	2	–	6	–	0	3	–	8	–	0
Morehead State	1	–	7	–	0	2	–	8	–	0
Tennessee State	1	–	7	–	0	2	–	9	–	0
$ – Conference champion; ^ – NCAA Division I-AA playoff participant; Rankings from The Sports Network poll

1995 Patriot League football standings
	Conf.					Overall
Team	W		L		T	W		L		T
Lehigh $	5	–	0	–	0	8	–	3	–	0
Bucknell	4	–	1	–	0	7	–	4	–	0
Lafayette	3	–	2	–	0	4	–	6	–	1
Fordham	2	–	3	–	0	4	–	6	–	1
Holy Cross	1	–	4	–	0	2	–	9	–	0
Colgate	0	–	5	–	0	0	–	11	–	0
$ – Conference champion

1995 Pioneer Football League standings
	Conf.					Overall
Team	W		L		T	W		L		T
Drake $	5	–	0	–	0	8	–	1	–	1
Dayton	4	–	1	–	0	9	–	2	–	0
San Diego	3	–	2	–	0	5	–	5	–	0
Evansville	1	–	4	–	0	5	–	5	–	0
Valparaiso	1	–	4	–	0	5	–	5	–	0
Butler	1	–	4	–	0	2	–	8	–	0
$ – Conference champion

1995 Southern Conference football standings
	Conf.					Overall
Team	W		L		T	W		L		T
No. 2 Appalachian State $^	8	–	0	–	0	12	–	1	–	0
No. 6 Marshall ^	7	–	1	–	0	12	–	3	–	0
No. 15 Georgia Southern ^	5	–	3	–	0	9	–	4	–	0
Furman	5	–	3	–	0	6	–	5	–	0
East Tennessee State	4	–	4	–	0	4	–	7	–	0
VMI	3	–	5	–	0	4	–	7	–	0
Chattanooga	2	–	6	–	0	4	–	7	–	0
Western Carolina	2	–	6	–	0	3	–	7	–	0
The Citadel	0	–	8	–	0	2	–	9	–	0
$ – Conference champion; ^ – NCAA Division I-AA playoff participant; Rankings from The Sports Network poll

1995 Southland Conference football standings
	Conf.					Overall
Team	W		L		T	W		L		T
No. 1 McNeese State $^	5	–	0	–	0	13	–	1	–	0
No. 5 Stephen F. Austin ^	4	–	1	–	0	11	–	2	–	0
Northwestern State	2	–	3	–	0	6	–	5	–	0
Sam Houston State	2	–	3	–	0	5	–	5	–	0
Southwest Texas State	2	–	3	–	0	4	–	7	–	0
Nicholls State	0	–	5	–	0	0	–	11	–	0
$ – Conference champion; ^ – NCAA Division I-AA playoff participant; Rankings from The Sports Network poll

1995 Southwestern Athletic Conference football standings
	Conf.			Overall
Team	W		L	W		L
No. 14 Jackson State $^	7	–	0	9	–	3
No. 11 Southern	6	–	1	11	–	1
Alabama State	5	–	2	8	–	3
Grambling State	4	–	3	5	–	6
Alcorn State	3	–	4	4	–	7
Mississippi Valley State	2	–	5	2	–	9
Texas Southern	1	–	6	2	–	8
Prairie View A&M	0	–	7	0	–	11
$ – Conference champion; ^ – NCAA Division I-AA playoff participant; Rankings from The Sports Network Poll

1995 Yankee Conference football standings
	Conf.					Overall
Team	W		L		T	W		L		T
New England Division
Rhode Island x	6	–	2	–	0	7	–	4	–	0
No. 23 Connecticut	5	–	3	–	0	8	–	3	–	0
New Hampshire	4	–	4	–	0	6	–	5	–	0
UMass	3	–	5	–	0	6	–	5	–	0
Boston University	1	–	7	–	0	3	–	8	–	0
Maine	1	–	7	–	0	3	–	8	–	0
Mid-Atlantic Division
No. 7 Delaware x$^	8	–	0	–	0	11	–	2	–	0
No. 13 James Madison ^	6	–	2	–	0	8	–	4	–	0
No. 19 William & Mary	5	–	3	–	0	7	–	4	–	0
No. 20 Richmond	5	–	3	–	0	7	–	3	–	1
Northeastern	2	–	6	–	0	4	–	7	–	0
Villanova	2	–	6	–	0	3	–	8	–	0
$ – Conference champion; x – Division champion/co-champions; ^ – NCAA Division I-AA playoff participant; Rankings from The Sports Network poll

1995 NCAA Division I-AA independents football standings
	Conf.			Overall
Team	W	L	T	W		L		T
No. 3 Troy State ^		–		11	–	1	–	0
No. 9 Hofstra ^		–		10	–	1	–	0
Saint Mary's		–		8	–	2	–	0
Wagner		–		8	–	2	–	0
Hampton		–		8	–	3	–	0
Liberty		–		8	–	3	–	0
Monmouth		–		7	–	3	–	0
Jacksonville State		–		7	–	4	–	0
Samford		–		7	–	4	–	0
Robert Morris		–		6	–	4	–	0
Towson State		–		6	–	4	–	0
UCF		–		6	–	5	–	0
UAB		–		5	–	6	–	0
Wofford		–		4	–	7	–	0
Buffalo		–		3	–	8	–	0
Youngstown State		–		3	–	8	–	0
Central Connecticut State		–		2	–	8	–	0
Western Kentucky		–		2	–	8	–	0
Davidson		–		1	–	8	–	1
Charleston Southern		–		1	–	10	–	0
Saint Francis (PA)		–		0	–	10	–	0
^ – NCAA Division I-AA playoff participant; Rankings from The Sports Network poll

== Conference champions ==
Conference Champions

American West Conference – Sacramento State
Big Sky Conference – Montana
Gateway Football Conference – Eastern Illinois and Northern Iowa
Ivy League – Princeton
Metro Atlantic Athletic Conference – Duquesne
Mid-Eastern Athletic Conference – Florida A&M
Ohio Valley Conference – Murray State
Patriot League – Lehigh
Pioneer Football League – Drake
Southern Conference – Appalachian State
Southland Conference – McNeese State
Southwestern Athletic Conference – Jackson State
Yankee Conference – Delaware

== Postseason ==
The site of the title game, Marshall University Stadium, had been determined in March 1994.

=== NCAA Division I-AA playoff bracket ===
First Round; November 25; Campus sites
15	Idaho	3
1	McNeese State*	33
11	Hofstra	17
8	Delaware*	33
16	Northern Iowa	35
4	Murray State*	34
12	Jackson State	8
5	Marshall*	38
13	James Madison	24
2	Appalachian State*	31
9	Eastern Illinois	29
7	Stephen F. Austin*	34
14	Georgia Southern	24
3	Troy State*	21
10	Eastern Kentucky	0
6	Montana*	48

Quarterfinals; December 2 Campus sites
1	McNeese State*	52
8	Delaware	18
16	Northern Iowa	24
5	Marshall*	41
2	Appalachian State*	17
7	Stephen F. Austin	27
14	Georgia Southern	0
6	Montana*	45

Semifinals; December 9 Campus sites
1	McNeese State*	13
5	Marshall	25
7	Stephen F. Austin	14
6	Montana*	70

National Championship Game; December 16; Marshall University Stadium; Huntington, West Virginia
5	Marshall	20
6	Montana	22

* Denotes host institution
