= 1996 Canisius Golden Griffins football team =

American college football season

1996 Canisius Golden Griffins football
- Conference: Metro Atlantic Athletic Conference
- Record: 5–4 (4–4 MAAC)
- Head coach: Chuck Williams (2nd season)
- Home stadium: Demske Sports Complex

1996 Metro Atlantic Athletic Conference football standings
	Conf.			Overall
Team	W		L	W		L
Duquesne $	8	–	0	10	–	1
Georgetown	7	–	1	7	–	3
Marist	6	–	2	7	–	3
St. John's	5	–	3	6	–	4
Canisius	4	–	4	5	–	4
Saint Peter's	2	–	6	2	–	7
Siena	2	–	6	2	–	7
Fairfield	1	–	7	1	–	8
Iona	1	–	7	1	–	9
$ – Conference champion

The 1996 Canisius Golden Griffins football team represented Canisius College as a member of the Metro Atlantic Athletic Conference (MAAC) during the 1996 NCAA Division I-AA football season. Led by second-year head coach Chuck Williams, the Golden Griffins compiled an overall record of 5–4 with a mark of 4–4 in conference play, placing fifth in the MAAC. The Canisius offense scored 158 points while the defense allowed 108 points.

The 1996 season was the only season in which the Golden Griffins had a winning record at the NCAA Division I level. Canisius's previous winning season came in 1990, had when team competed at the NCAA Division III level. This was the program's final winning season.

== Schedule ==
Date	Time	Opponent	Site	Result	Attendance
September 14	1:00 pm	at Gannon*	Sox Harrison Stadium; Edinboro, PA	W 21–0	1,300
September 28	1:30 pm	Saint Peter's	Demske Field; Buffalo, NY	W 12–7	471
October 5	12:00 pm	at Iona	Mazzella Field; New Rochelle, NY	W 42–0	811
October 12	1:30 pm	Siena	Demske Field; Buffalo, NY	W 25–7	558
October 19	1:00 pm	at Fairfield	Alumni Stadium; Fairfield, CT	W 21–0	486
October 26	3:00 pm	St. John's	Demske Field; Buffalo, NY	L 28–41	1,173
November 2	1:00 pm	at Georgetown	Kehoe Field; Washington, DC	L 0–24	
November 9	1:00 pm	at Marist	Leonidoff Field; Poughkeepsie, NY	L 6–9	2,500
November 16	1:30 pm	Duquesne	Demske Field; Buffalo, NY	L 3–20	811
*Non-conference game; All times are in Eastern time
