= 2001 La Salle Explorers football team =

American college football season

2001 La Salle Explorers football
- Conference: Metro Atlantic Athletic Conference
- Record: 5–4 (2–4 MAAC)
- Head coach: Bill Manlove (5th season)
- Home stadium: McCarthy Stadium

2001 Metro Atlantic Athletic Conference football standings
	Conf.			Overall
Team	W		L	W		L
Duquesne $	6	–	0	8	–	3
Saint Peter's	6	–	1	10	–	1
Fairfield	5	–	2	5	–	5
Iona	3	–	3	4	–	5
La Salle	2	–	4	5	–	4
Marist	2	–	4	3	–	6
Siena	1	–	6	1	–	8
Canisius	1	–	6	1	–	9
$ – Conference champion

The 2001 La Salle Explorers football team was an American football team that represented La Salle University as a member of the Metro Atlantic Athletic Conference (MAAC) during the 2001 NCAA Division I-AA football season. In their fifth year under head coach Bill Manlove, the Explorers compiled a 5–4 record.

== Schedule ==
Date	Opponent	Site	Result	Attendance	Source
September 8	at Saint Francis (PA)*	Pine Bowl; Loretto, PA	W 42–37	930	
September 22	Canisius	McCarthy Stadium; Philadelphia, PA	W 21–14	1,525	
September 29	Catholic University*	McCarthy Stadium; Philadelphia, PA	W 20–12	2,278	
October 6	at Siena	Heritage Park; Colonie, NY	L 6–20		
October 13	Saint Peter's	McCarthy Stadium; Philadelphia, PA	L 7–23	2,746	
October 20	at Duquesne	Arthur J. Rooney Athletic Field; Pittsburgh, PA	L 0–34	3,877	
October 27	St. John's*	McCarthy Stadium; Philadelphia, PA	W 28–12	1,460	
November 3	Iona	McCarthy Stadium; Philadelphia, PA	W 30–27	1,187	
November 10	at Fairfield	Alumni Stadium; Fairfield, CT	L 0–27	1,257	
*Non-conference game
