= 1995 Siena Saints football team =

American college football season

1995 Siena Saints football
- Conference: Metro Atlantic Athletic Conference
- Record: 0–9 (0–7 MAAC)
- Head coach: Jack DuBois (14th season)
- Home stadium: Heritage Park

1995 Metro Atlantic Athletic Conference football standings
	Conf.					Overall
Team		W		L			W		L
Duquesne $	7	–	0	–	0	10	–	1	–	0
Georgetown	5	–	2	–	0	6	–	3	–	0
Marist	4	–	3	–	0	6	–	4	–	0
Canisius	4	–	3	–	0	4	–	6	–	0
St. John's	3	–	4	–	0	4	–	6	–	0
Iona	3	–	4	–	0	3	–	6	–	0
Saint Peter's	2	–	5	–	0	2	–	7	–	0
Siena	0	–	7	–	0	0	–	9	–	0
$ – Conference champion

The 1995 Siena Saints football team was an American football team that represented Siena College as a member of the Metro Atlantic Athletic Conference (MAAC) during the 1995 NCAA Division I-AA football season. In their 14th year under head coach Jack DuBois, the team compiled an overall record of 0–9, with a mark of 0–7 in conference play, and finished eighth in the MAAC.

== Schedule ==
Date	Opponent	Site	Result	Attendance	Source
September 16	Canisius	Heritage Park; Colonie, NY	L 13–33	810	
September 23	Saint Peter's	Heritage Park; Colonie, NY	L 19–25		
September 30	Iona	Heritage Park; Colonie, NY	L 6–18		
October 7	at RPI*	'86 Field; Troy, NY	L 0–59		
October 14	at Central Connecticut State*	Arute Field; New Britain, CT	L 7–24		
October 21	at Duquesne	Arthur J. Rooney Athletic Field; Pittsburgh, PA	L 7–21		
October 28	St. John's	Heritage Park; Colonie, NY	L 21–22		
November 4	at Georgetown	Kehoe Field; Washington, DC	L 19–33		
November 11	at Marist	Leonidoff Field; Poughkeepsie, NY	L 6–49		
*Non-conference game
