= Cochrane Stadium =

Stadium in New Jersey, USA

Coordinates: 40.6916°N 74.0806°W

- Interactive map of Cochrane Stadium
- Location: 1 Chapel Avenue; Jersey City, NJ 07305
- Owner: Jersey City Board of Education
- Operator: Jersey City Department of Recreation and Youth Development
- Capacity: 4,000
- Surface: FieldTurf

Construction
- Opened: 1983
- Renovated: 2008
- Cost: $1.07 million (renovation)

Tenants
- Jersey City Board of Education (1983–present); Saint Peter's Peacocks (NCAA) (1983–2006); Rugby New York (MLR) (2021)

Cochrane Stadium is a 4,000-seat multi-purpose stadium in Jersey City, New Jersey. Opened in October 1983, the stadium is located in the Ed "Faa" Ford Athletic Complex in the Caven Point area of Jersey City near Liberty State Park and Liberty National Golf Club.

In 2008, the stadium's field was re-surfaced with FieldTurf six months after the previous playing surface was found to be contaminated with lead.

Cochrane Stadium (often referred to as Caven Point due to the surrounding area) served as the home field for the St. Peter's Peacocks football team until the school folded its program in 2007.

In 2021, the stadium hosted five home games for Rugby New York of Major League Rugby (MLR).

Five Jersey City high schools (two Catholic, three public) currently share Cochrane Stadium. They are:

- St. Peter's Preparatory School
- Hudson Catholic High School
- James J. Ferris High School
- Lincoln High School
- Henry Snyder High School
