= 1995 NCAA Division I-AA football rankings =

The 1995 NCAA Division I-AA football rankings are from the Sports Network poll of Division I-AA head coaches, athletic directors, sports information directors and media members. This is for the 1995 season.

== Legend ==
| | Increase in ranking |
| | Decrease in ranking |
| | Not ranked previous week |
| (#–#) | Win–loss record |
| (Italics) | Number of first place votes |
| т | Tied with team above or below also with this symbol |

== The Sports Network poll ==
| | Preseason | Week 2 Sept 6 | Week 3 Sept 13 | Week 4 Sept 20 | Week 5 Sept 26 | Week 6 Oct 4 | Week 7 Oct 11 | Week 8 Oct 18 | Week 9 Oct 25 | Week 10 Nov 1 | Week 11 Nov 7 | Week 12 Nov 15 | Week 13 Nov 21 | |
|---|---|---|---|---|---|---|---|---|---|---|---|---|---|---|
| 1. | Youngstown State | McNeese State (1–0) (26) | McNeese State (2–0) (48) | McNeese State (3–0) (58) | McNeese State (4–0) (72) | McNeese State (5–0) (74) | McNeese State (5–0) (74) | McNeese State (6–0) (74) | McNeese State (7–0) (77) | McNeese State (8–0) (80) | McNeese State (9–0) (81) | McNeese State (10–0) (82) | McNeese State (11–0) (78) | 1. |
| 2. | Marshall | Appalachian State (1–0) (11) | Appalachian State (2–0) (9) | Appalachian State (3–0) (4) | Appalachian State (3–0) (4) | Appalachian State (4–0) (3) | Appalachian State (5–0) (2) | Appalachian State (6–0) (2) | Appalachian State (7–0) (8) | Appalachian State (8–0) (7) | Appalachian State (9–0) (7) | Appalachian State (10–0) (6) | Appalachian State (11–0) (4) | 2. |
| 3. | McNeese State | Marshall (0–1) (2) | Boise State (1–0) (7) | Boise State (2–0) (6) | Marshall (2–1) (2) | Marshall (3–1) (2) | Marshall (4–1) (3) | Marshall (5–1) (3) | Stephen F. Austin (7–0) (2) | Troy State (9–0) (1) | Troy State (9–0) | Troy State (10–0) (1) | Troy State (11–0) (1) | 3. |
| 4. | Montana | Montana (1–0) (6) | Marshall (1–1) (2) | Marshall (2–1) (6) | Stephen F. Austin (4–0) (1) | Stephen F. Austin (4–0) (1) | Stephen F. Austin (5–0) (1) | Stephen F. Austin (6–0) (1) | Troy State (8–0) | Delaware (8–0) (2) | Delaware (9–0) (1) | Murray State (10–0) | Murray State (11–0) | 4. |
| 5. | Eastern Kentucky | Boise State (0–0) | Stephen F. Austin (2–0) (2) | Stephen F. Austin (3–0) (1) | Montana (3–1) (3) | Montana (4–1) (3) | Montana (5–1) (3) | Troy State (7–0) | Delaware (7–0) | Eastern Kentucky (7–1) | Murray State (9–0) | Stephen F. Austin (8–1) | Stephen F. Austin (9–1) | 5. |
| 6. | Appalachian State | Youngstown State (0–1) (3) | James Madison (2–0) (1) | Montana (2–1) | Troy State (4–0) | Troy State (5–0) | Troy State (6–0) | Montana (6–1) (3) | Eastern Kentucky (6–1) | Stephen F. Austin (7–1) | Stephen F. Austin (7–1) | Marshall (8–2) | Marshall (9–2) | 6. |
| 7. | James Madison | James Madison (1–0) (1) | Montana (1–1) | Troy State (3–0) | James Madison (3–1) | James Madison (4–1) | James Madison (5–1) | Delaware (6–0) | Marshall (5–2) | Marshall (6–2) | Marshall (7–2) | Hofstra (10–0) (1) | Delaware (10–1) | 7. |
| 8. | Boise State | Stephen F. Austin (1–0) | Troy State (2–0) | James Madison (2–1) | Eastern Kentucky (3–1) | Eastern Kentucky (4–1) | Delaware (5–0) | Eastern Kentucky (5–1) | Murray State (7–0) | Murray State (8–0) | Hofstra (9–0) | Delaware (9–1) | Montana (9–2) | 8. |
| 9. | Penn | Troy State (1–0) | Eastern Kentucky (1–1) | Eastern Kentucky (2–1) | Southern (4–0) | Delaware (4–0) | Eastern Kentucky (4–1) | Murray State (7–0) | Hofstra (8–0) | Hofstra (9–0) | Montana (7–2) | Montana (8–2) | Hofstra (10–1) | 9. |
| 10. | Southern | Southern (1–0) | Southern (2–0) | Southern (3–0) (1) | Delaware (3–0) | Southern (5–0) (3) | Southern (5–0) (2) | James Madison (6–1) | Montana (6–2) | Montana (6–2) | Eastern Kentucky (7–2) | Eastern Kentucky (8–2) | Eastern Kentucky (9–2) | 10. |
| 11. | Delaware | Eastern Kentucky (0–1) | Delaware (1–0) | Delaware (2–0) | Boise State (2–1) | Murray State (5–0) | Murray State (6–0) | Hofstra (7–0) (1) | Northern Iowa (5–2) | Northern Iowa (6–2) | Southern (8–1) | Southern (9–1) (1) | Southern (9–1) | 11. |
| 12. | William & Mary | Delaware (0–0) | Grambling State (1–0) | UCF (2–0) | UCF (2–1) | Richmond (4–0) | Richmond (5–0) | William & Mary (5–2) | Southern (6–1) | Southern (7–1) | Eastern Illinois (8–1) | Eastern Illinois (9–1) | Eastern Illinois (10–1) | 12. |
| 13. | Stephen F. Austin | Grambling State (1–0) | Georgia Southern (2–0) | Idaho (1–1) | Idaho (1–1) | Penn (3–0) | Georgia Southern (4–1) | Southern (5–1) (2) | Georgia Southern (6–2) | Northern Arizona (7–2) | Richmond (7–1–1) | James Madison (8–3) | James Madison (8–3) | 13. |
| 14. | Idaho | Idaho (0–1) | UCF (2–0) | Youngstown State (1–2) | Penn (2–0) | Georgia Southern (3–1) | Hofstra (6–0) (1) | Northern Iowa (4–2) | Northwestern State (6–2) | Florida A&M (7–1) | Indiana State (7–2) | Jackson State (8–2) | Jackson State (9–2) | 14. |
| 15. | Troy State | Penn (0–0) | Youngstown State (0–2) | Boston University (2–0) | Murray State (4–0) | Hofstra (5–0) | Idaho State (5–0) | Connecticut (5–0) | James Madison (6–2) | Eastern Illinois (7–1) | Northern Iowa (6–3) | Florida A&M (8–2) | Georgia Southern (8–3) | 15. |
| 16. | Grambling State | William & Mary (0–1) | Idaho (0–1) | Penn (1–0) | Richmond (3–0) | Idaho State (4–0) | Northern Arizona (5–1) | Richmond (6–0) | Northern Arizona (6–2) | Richmond (6–1–1) | Jackson State (7–2) | Boise State (7–3) | Florida A&M (8–2) | 16. |
| 17. | UMass | Georgia Southern (1–0) | Penn (0–0) | Richmond (3–0) | Georgia Southern (3–1) | William & Mary (3–2) | William & Mary (4–2) | Georgia Southern (4–2) | Florida A&M (6–1) | Indiana State (7–2) | Northern Arizona (7–3) | Georgia Southern (7–3) | Idaho (6–4) | 17. |
| 18. | New Hampshire | New Hampshire (0–0) | Boston University (1–0) | Georgia Southern (2–1) | William & Mary (2–2) | Northern Arizona (4–1) | Northern Iowa (3–2) | Florida A&M (6–1) | Eastern Illinois (6–1) | William & Mary (6–3) | James Madison (7–3) | Richmond (7–2–1) | Northern Iowa (7–4) | 18. |
| 19. | Northern Iowa | UMass (0–0) | William & Mary (0–2) | Murray State (3–0) | Hofstra (4–0) | Boise State (2–2) | UCF (3–2) | Northwestern State (5–2) | Richmond (5–1) | Jackson State (6–2) | Northwestern State (6–3) | Indiana State (7–3) | William & Mary (7–4) | 19. |
| 20. | Southeast Missouri State | Liberty (1–0) | Richmond (2–0) | William & Mary (1–2) | Northern Arizona (3–1) | UCF (2–2) | Connecticut (5–0) | Eastern Illinois (6–1) | William & Mary (5–3) | Northwestern State (6–3) | Florida A&M (7–2) | William & Mary (7–4) | Richmond (7–3–1) | 20. |
| 21. | Liberty | UCF (1–0) | Northern Iowa (0–2) | Grambling State (1–1) | Boston University (2–1) | Northern Iowa (2–2) | Florida A&M (5–1) | Northern Arizona (5–2) | Connecticut (6–1) | James Madison (6–3) | Georgia Southern (6–3) | Northwestern State (6–4) | Boise State (7–4) | 21. |
| 22. | Boston University | Boston University (0–0) | New Hampshire (0–1) | Northern Iowa (1–2) | Northern Iowa (1–2) | Eastern Illinois (5–0) | Penn (3–1) | Idaho State (5–1) | Indiana State (6–2) | Georgia Southern (5–3) | Rhode Island (7–2) | Northern Iowa (6–4) | Northern Arizona (7–4) | 22. |
| 23. | Florida A&M | Northern Iowa (0–1) | Western Illinois (1–1) | Western Illinois (2–1) | Florida A&M (3–1) | Florida A&M (4–1) | Indiana State (5–1) | Montana State (5–2) | Jackson State (6–2) | Rhode Island (6–2) | Boise State (6–3) | Northern Arizona (7–4) | Connecticut (8–3) | 23. |
| 24. | Georgia Southern | Western Illinois (1–0) | Murray State (2–0) | Northern Arizona (2–1) | Idaho State (3–0) | Idaho (1–2) | Northwestern State (4–2) | Jacksonville State (6–1) | Jacksonville State (6–2) | Boise State (5–3) | Connecticut (7–2) | Middle Tennessee (7–3) | Indiana State (7–4) | 24. |
| 25. | Western Illinois | Florida A&M (1–0) | Northern Arizona (1–1) | Hofstra (3–0) | Youngstown State (1–3) (1) | Jacksonville State (5–0) | Eastern Illinois (5–1) | Dayton (6–0) | Boise State (4–3) | Connecticut (6–2) | William & Mary (6–4) | Idaho (5–4) | Middle Tennessee (7–4) | 25. |
| | Preseason | Week 2 Sept 6 | Week 3 Sept 13 | Week 4 Sept 20 | Week 5 Sept 26 | Week 6 Oct 4 | Week 7 Oct 11 | Week 8 Oct 18 | Week 9 Oct 25 | Week 10 Nov 1 | Week 11 Nov 7 | Week 12 Nov 15 | Week 13 Nov 21 | |
| | | Dropped: 20 Southeast Missouri State | Dropped: 19 UMass; 20 Liberty; 25 Florida A&M | Dropped: 22 New Hampshire | Dropped: 21 Grambling State; 23 Western Illinois | Dropped: 21 Boston University; 25 Youngstown State | Dropped: 19 Boise State; 24 Idaho; 25 Jacksonville State | Dropped: 19 UCF; 22 Penn; 23 Indiana State | Dropped: 22 Idaho State; 23 Montana State; 25 Dayton | Dropped: 24 Jacksonville State | None | Dropped: 22 Rhode Island; 24 Connecticut | Dropped: 21 Northwestern State | |
