= List of Drake Bulldogs football seasons =

This is a list of seasons completed by the Drake Bulldogs football team of the National Collegiate Athletic Association (NCAA) Division I Football Championship Subdivision (FCS). The Drake fielded their first team in 1893 and are currently without a head coach. The 1986 season was exhibition only.

== Seasons ==
Legend

^{†} National champion
^{‡} Conference champion
^ Bowl game berth
* Playoff berth

Season	Coach	Conference	Conference results				Season results			Bowl/Playoff/Postseason result	Final ranking	
Season	Coach	Conference	Finish	Wins	Losses	Ties	Wins	Losses	Ties	Bowl/Playoff/Postseason result	NCAA/TSN Poll	Coaches Poll
Drake Bulldogs
1893	No Coach	Independent	—	—	—	—	0	2	1	—	—	—
1894	W. W. Wharton	Independent	—	—	—	—	2	2	0	—	—	—
1895	Hermon Williams	Independent	—	—	—	—	1	4	0	—	—	—
1896	Fred Rogers	Independent	—	—	—	—	2	3	0	—	—	—
1897	A. B. Potter	Independent	—	—	—	—	2	3	0	—	—	—
1898	A. B. Potter	Independent	—	—	—	—	4	2	0	—	—	—
1899	A. B. Potter	Independent	—	—	—	—	5	2	0	—	—	—
1900	Charles Best	Independent	—	—	—	—	6	3	0	—	—	—
1901	Charles Best	Independent	—	—	—	—	4	4	0	—	—	—
1902	G. O. Dietz	Independent	—	—	—	—	4	3	1	—	—	—
1903	W. J. Monilaw	Independent	—	—	—	—	5	3	0	—	—	—
1904	W. J. Monilaw	Independent	—	—	—	—	5	4	0	—	—	—
1905	Willie M. Heston	Independent	—	—	—	—	4	4	0	—	—	—
1906	Charles Pell	Independent	—	—	—	—	2	4	1	—	—	—
1907	Charles Pell	Independent	—	—	—	—	3	4	0	—	—	—
1908	John L. Griffith	MVC	5th	1	2	0	5	2	0	—	—	—
1909	John L. Griffith	MVC	3rd	2	1	0	6	1	0	—	—	—
1910	John L. Griffith	MVC	7th	0	3	0	2	5	0	—	—	—
1911	John L. Griffith	MVC	6th	0	2	1	5	2	1	—	—	—
1912	John L. Griffith	MVC	3rd	2	2	0	4	3	0	—	—	—
1913	John L. Griffith	MVC	5th	1	3	0	4	3	1	—	—	—
1914	John L. Griffith	MVC	T–6th	0	3	0	4	3	1	—	—	—
1915	John L. Griffith	MVC	6th	1	4	0	2	6	0	—	—	—
1916	Ralph Glaze	MVC	6th	1	3	0	3	5	0	—	—	—
1917	Ralph Glaze	MVC	7th	0	3	0	0	5	2	—	—	—
1918	M. B. Banks	MVC	—	—	—	—	3	2	0	—	—	—
1919	M. B. Banks	MVC	T–3rd	2	2	0	4	3	0	—	—	—
1920	M. B. Banks	MVC	5th	1	3	1	4	5	1	—	—	—
1921	Ossie Solem	MVC	4th	2	2	0	5	2	0	—	—	—
1922^{‡}	Ossie Solem	MVC	T–1st♦	4	0	0	7	0	0	—	—	—
1923	Ossie Solem	MVC	3rd	3	1	0	5	2	0	—	—	—
1924	Ossie Solem	MVC	T–2nd	3	1	0	5	2	1	—	—	—
1925	Ossie Solem	MVC	2nd	5	2	0	5	3	0	—	—	—
1926	Ossie Solem	MVC	8th	1	4	0	2	6	0	—	—	—
1927	Ossie Solem	MVC	9th	1	2	0	3	6	0	—	—	—
1928^{‡}	Ossie Solem	MVC	1st	3	0	0	7	1	0	—	—	—
1929^{‡}	Ossie Solem	MVC	1st	3	0	1	5	3	1	—	—	—
1930^{‡}	Ossie Solem	MVC	1st	3	0	0	5	4	0	—	—	—
1931^{‡}	Ossie Solem	MVC	1st	3	0	0	5	6	0	—	—	—
1932	Evan O. Williams	MVC	5th	1	3	1	2	6	1	—	—	—
1933	Vee Green	MVC	2nd	4	1	0	6	3	1	—	—	—
1934	Vee Green	MVC	3rd	2	2	0	3	6	1	—	—	—
1935	Vee Green	MVC	4th	1	2	1	4	4	2	—	—	—
1936	Vee Green	MVC	3rd	3	2	0	6	4	0	—	—	—
1937	Vee Green	MVC	2nd	4	1	0	8	2	0	—	—	—
1938	Vee Green	MVC	T–4th	2	1	1	5	4	1	—	—	—
1939	Vee Green	MVC	4th	2	3	0	5	5	0	—	—	—
1940	Vee Green	MVC	T–3rd	2	2	0	4	5	0	—	—	—
1941	Vee Green	MVC	6th	0	3	1	4	5	1	—	—	—
1942	Vee Green	MVC	T–5th	1	4	0	3	7	0	—	—	—
1943	Vee Green	MVC	3rd	0	0	0	4	2	0	—	—	—
1944	Vee Green	MVC	3rd	0	0	0	7	2	0	—	—	—
1945^{^}	Vee Green	MVC	4th	2	1	0	5	4	1	Won Raisin Bowl vs. Fresno State, 13–12	—	—
1946	Vee Green	MVC	5th	0	4	0	2	6	1	—	—	—
1947	Albert Kawal	MVC	4th	1	3	0	1	7	1	—	—	—
1948^{^}	Albert Kawal	MVC	3rd	1	1	0	7	3	0	Won 1949 Salad Bowl vs. Arizona, 14–13	—	—
1949	Warren Gaer	MVC	2nd	3	1	0	6	2	1	—	—	—
1950	Warren Gaer	MVC	T–4th	1	2	1	6	2	1	—	—	—
1951	Warren Gaer	MVC	2nd	3	1	0	7	2	0	—	—	—
1952	Warren Gaer	Independent	—	—	—	—	2	7	0	—	—	—
1953	Warren Gaer	Independent	—	—	—	—	4	4	0	—	—	—
1954	Warren Gaer	Independent	—	—	—	—	2	7	0	—	—	—
1955	Warren Gaer	Independent	—	—	—	—	4	4	0	—	—	—
1956	Warren Gaer	Independent	—	—	—	—	3	6	0	—	—	—
1957^{^}	Warren Gaer	Independent	—	—	—	—	7	2	0	Lost Sun Bowl vs. Louisville, 20–34	—	—
1958	Warren Gaer	Independent	—	—	—	—	2	7	0	—	—	—
1959	Warren Gaer	Independent	—	—	—	—	2	7	0	—	—	—
1960	Bus Mertes	Independent	—	—	—	—	4	5	0	—	—	—
1961	Bus Mertes	Independent	—	—	—	—	5	4	0	—	—	—
1962	Bus Mertes	Independent	—	—	—	—	8	2	0	—	—	—
1963	Bus Mertes	Independent	—	—	—	—	4	4	0	—	—	—
1964	Bus Mertes	Independent	—	—	—	—	6	4	0	—	—	—
1965	Jack Wallace	Independent	—	—	—	—	6	4	0	—	—	—
1966	Jack Wallace	Independent	—	—	—	—	8	2	0	—	—	—
1967	Jack Wallace	Independent	—	—	—	—	4	5	0	—	—	—
1968	Jack Wallace	Independent	—	—	—	—	5	5	0	—	—	—
1969^{^}	Jack Wallace	Independent	—	—	—	—	7	2	2	Lost Pecan Bowl vs. Arkansas State, 21–29	—	—
1970	Jack Wallace	Independent	—	—	—	—	7	4	0	—	—	—
1971	Jack Wallace	MVC	5th	2	3	0	7	4	0	—	—	—
1972^{‡ ^}	Jack Wallace	MVC	T–1st♦	4	1	0	7	5	0	Lost Pioneer Bowl vs. Tennessee State, 7–29	—	—
1973	Jack Wallace	MVC	T–6th	1	5	0	2	9	0	—	—	—
1974	Jack Wallace	MVC	4th	2	3	1	3	7	1	—	—	—
1975	Jack Wallace	MVC	T–4th	1	3	0	3	8	0	—	—	—
1976	Jack Wallace	MVC	5th	1	3	0	1	10	0	—	—	—
1977	Chuck Shelton	MVC	6th	1	5	0	2	9	0	—	—	—
1978	Chuck Shelton	MVC	4th	3	3	0	4	7	0	—	—	—
1979	Chuck Shelton	MVC	T–4th	1	4	0	3	8	0	—	—	—
1980	Chuck Shelton	MVC	4th	3	2	0	8	3	0	—	—	—
1981^{‡}	Chuck Shelton	MVC	T–1st♦	5	1	0	10	1	0	—	—	—
1982	Chuck Shelton	MVC	5th	2	4	0	4	7	0	—	—	—
1983	Chuck Shelton	MVC	6th	1	6	0	1	10	0	—	—	—
1984	Chuck Shelton	MVC	T–4th	2	3	0	4	7	0	—	—	—
1985	Chuck Shelton	MVC	T–6th	1	4	0	4	7	0	—	—	—
1986	Drake did not play football during the 1986 season because it dropped football											
1987	Nick Quartaro	Independent	—	—	—	—	5	5	0	—	—	—
1988	Nick Quartaro	Independent	—	—	—	—	7	3	0	—	—	—
1989	Rob Ash	Independent	—	—	—	—	7	3	0	—	—	—
1990	Rob Ash	Independent	—	—	—	—	6	4	0	—	—	—
1991	Rob Ash	Independent	—	—	—	—	4	6	0	—	—	—
1992	Rob Ash	Independent	—	—	—	—	7	2	1	—	—	—
1993	Rob Ash	PFL	T–2nd	3	2	0	8	2	0	—	—	—
1994	Rob Ash	PFL	3rd	3	2	0	7	3	0	—	—	—
1995^{‡}	Rob Ash	PFL	1st	5	0	0	8	1	1	—	—	—
1996	Rob Ash	PFL	2nd	4	1	—	8	3	—	—	—	—
1997	Rob Ash	PFL	T–3rd	2	3	—	8	3	—	—	—	—
1998^{‡}	Rob Ash	PFL	1st	4	0	—	7	3	—	—	—	—
1999	Rob Ash	PFL	T–3rd	2	2	—	7	4	—	—	—	—
2000^{‡}	Rob Ash	PFL	T–1st♦	3	1	—	7	4	—	—	—	—
2001	Rob Ash	PFL	T–4th (North)	1	3	—	5	5	—	—	—	—
2002	Rob Ash	PFL	4th (North)	1	3	—	5	6	—	—	—	—
2003	Rob Ash	PFL	T–4th (North)	1	3	—	6	6	—	—	—	—
2004^{‡}	Rob Ash	PFL	1st (North)	4	0	—	10	2	—	Won PFL Championship Game vs. Morehead State, 20–17	—	—
2005	Rob Ash	PFL	3rd (North)	2	2	—	6	4	—	—	—	—
2006	Rob Ash	PFL	2nd	6	1	—	9	2	—	—	—	—
2007	Steve Loney	PFL	5th	3	4	—	6	5	—	—	—	—
2008	Chris Creighton	PFL	T–4th	4	4	—	6	5	—	—	—	—
2009	Chris Creighton	PFL	T–3rd	6	2	—	8	3	—	—	—	—
2010	Chris Creighton	PFL	3rd	6	2	—	7	4	—	—	—	—
2011^{‡}	Chris Creighton	PFL	T–1st♦	7	1	—	9	2	—	—	RV	—
2012^{‡}	Chris Creighton	PFL	T–1st♦	7	1	—	8	3	—	—	RV	—
2013	Chris Creighton	PFL	T–4th	5	3	—	6	5	—	—	—	—
2014	Rick Fox	PFL	T–3rd	6	2	—	7	4	—	—	—	—
2015	Rick Fox	PFL	T–4th	4	4	—	5	6	—	—	—	—
2016	Rick Fox	PFL	3rd	6	2	—	7	4	—	—	—	—
2017	Rick Fox	PFL	2nd	6	2	—	7	4	—	—	—	—
2018	Rick Fox	PFL	3rd	6	2	—	7	4	—	—	—	—
2019	Todd Stepsis	PFL	T–2nd	6	2	—	6	5	—	—	—	—
2020–21	Todd Stepsis	PFL	6th	2	3	—	2	3	—	—	—	—
2021	Todd Stepsis	PFL	T–9th	1	7	—	2	9	—	—	—	—
2022	Todd Stepsis	PFL	8th	3	5	—	3	8	—	—	—	—
2023	Todd Stepsis	PFL	1st	8	0	—	8	4	—	Lost to North Dakota State in 1st Round FCS Playoffs, 3–66	—	—
2024	Todd Stepsis	PFL	1st	7	1	—	8	3	—	Lost to Tarleton State in 1st Round FCS Playoffs, 29–43	—	—
Total				106	130	9	—	—	—	(only includes Missouri Valley Conference games)		
Total				148	72	0	—	—	—	(only includes Pioneer Football League games)		
Total				—	—	—	2	3	0	(only includes bowl games; 5 appearances)		
Total				244	202	9	651	552	28	(all games, totals)		
♦ Denotes a tie for first place and conference co-champion

== Bowl results ==
Season	Date	Bowl	Opponent	Result	Site
1945	January 1	Raisin Bowl	Fresno State	W 13–12	Fresno, California
1948	January 1	Salad Bowl	Arizona	W 14–13	Phoenix, Arizona
1957	January 1	Sun Bowl	Louisville	L 20–34	El Paso, Texas
1969	December 13	Pecan Bowl	Arkansas State	L 21–29	Arlington, Texas
1972	December 10	Pioneer Bowl	Tennessee State	L 7–29	Wichita Falls, Texas
