= 1993 San Diego Toreros football team =

American college football season

1993 San Diego Toreros football
- Conference: Pioneer Football League
- Record: 6–4 (1–4 PFL)
- Head coach: Brian Fogarty (11th season)
- Home stadium: Torero Stadium

1993 Pioneer Football League standings
	Conf.			Overall
Team	W		L	W		L
Dayton $	5	–	0	9	–	1
Drake	3	–	2	8	–	2
Butler	3	–	2	4	–	6
Evansville	2	–	3	6	–	4
San Diego	1	–	4	6	–	4
Valparaiso	1	–	4	5	–	5
$ – Conference champion

The 1993 San Diego Toreros football team represented the University of San Diego as a member of the Pioneer Football League (PFL) during the 1993 NCAA Division I-AA football season. The team was led by 11th-year head coach Brian Fogarty and played their home games at the Torero Stadium in San Diego. The Toreros compiled an overall record of 6–4, with a mark of 1–4 in conference play, and finished tied for fifth in the PFL.

== Schedule ==
Date	Opponent	Site	Result	Attendance	Source
September 4	Menlo*	Torero Stadium; San Diego, CA	W 32–7		
September 11	La Verne*	Torero Stadium; San Diego, CA	W 30–28		
September 25	at Dayton	Welcome Stadium; Dayton, OH	L 7–30	5,221	
October 2	at Valparaiso	Brown Field; Valparaiso, IN	L 25–35	5,000	
October 9	at Cal Lutheran*	Mount Clef Stadium; Thousand Oaks, CA	W 27–21	2,317	
October 16	at Evansville	Arad McCutchan Stadium; Evansville, IN	L 21–27	779	
October 23	Butler	Torero Stadium; San Diego, CA	W 28–27		
October 30	Azusa Pacific*	Torero Stadium; San Diego, CA	W 24–21		
November 6	Drake	Torero Stadium; San Diego, CA	L 14–17		
November 13	Wagner*	Torero Stadium; San Diego, CA	W 44–14	2,351	
*Non-conference game
