= Records for safeties in football =

In gridiron football, a safety is scored when the ball becomes dead behind the goal line of the team in possession of the ball (unless the ball arrived in the end zone due to impetus from the other team). In most instances, a safety is scored by the defensive team when the ball-carrier of the team in possession of the ball retreats into his own end zone and is tackled or steps out of play from the end zone. A safety can also occur when the offensive team loses control of the ball and it goes out of play from the end zone. Due to their uncommon nature, there are a number of records relating to safeties.

== Games in which both teams scored a safety ==
According to Pro Football Reference, only 9 NFL games since 1940, and only 1 since 1995, have seen both teams score at least one safety. In none of these 9 games did either team score more than one safety.

| Date | Road team | Road Score | Home team | Home Score |
|---|---|---|---|---|
| October 19, 1952 | San Francisco 49ers | 40 | Chicago Bears | 16 |
| October 22, 1972 | Cincinnati Bengals | 12 | Los Angeles Rams | 15 |
| September 19, 1976 | Chicago Bears | 19 | San Francisco 49ers | 12 |
| October 29, 1978 | Baltimore Colts | 8 | Miami Dolphins | 26 |
| October 5, 1980 | Detroit Lions | 28 | Atlanta Falcons | 43 |
| October 2, 1988 | Houston Oilers | 23 | Philadelphia Eagles | 32 |
| November 14, 1993 | Cleveland Browns | 5 | Seattle Seahawks | 22 |
| December 4, 1994 | Arizona Cardinals | 30 | Houston Oilers | 12 |
| November 3, 2019 | New York Jets | 18 | Miami Dolphins | 26 |

== Games in which a team scored only safeties ==
According to Pro-Football Reference, only 38 games in NFL history (including the AFPA, AAFC and AFL, leagues that were later merged into the NFL) and only eight since the NFL/AFL merger of 1970 have ended with one team scoring only a safety (or multiple safeties).

| Date | Winner | Winning score | Loser | Losing Score |
|---|---|---|---|---|
| November 29, 1923 | Akron Pros | 2 | Buffalo All-Americans | 0 |
| November 21, 1926 | Kansas City Cowboys | 2 | Buffalo Rangers | 0 |
| November 29, 1928 | Frankford Yellow Jackets | 2 | Green Bay Packers | 0 |
| October 16, 1932 | Green Bay Packers | 2 | Chicago Bears | 0 |
| September 18, 1938 | Chicago Bears | 2 | Green Bay Packers | 0 |
| October 30, 1921 | Dayton Triangles | 3 | Cleveland Indians | 2 |
| October 24, 1926 | Chicago Cardinals | 3 | Milwaukee Badgers | 2 |
| November 1, 1931 | Green Bay Packers | 6 | Chicago Bears | 2 |
| December 12, 1970 | Dallas Cowboys | 6 | Cleveland Browns | 2 |
| October 31, 1926 | Kansas City Cowboys | 7 | Hartford Blues | 2 |
| November 28, 1926 | Kansas City Cowboys | 7 | Chicago Cardinals | 2 |
| December 12, 1993 | New England Patriots | 7 | Cincinnati Bengals | 2 |
| October 6, 1929 | Green Bay Packers | 9 | Chicago Cardinals | 2 |
| November 21, 1926 | Duluth Eskimos | 10 | Canton Bulldogs | 2 |
| November 25, 1923 | Racine Legion | 10 | Chicago Cardinals | 4^ |
| September 30, 1923 | Milwaukee Badgers | 13 | Oorang Indians | 2 |
| October 10, 1926 | Milwaukee Badgers | 13 | Racine Tornadoes | 2 |
| December 5, 1983 | Detroit Lions | 13 | Minnesota Vikings | 2 |
| September 26, 1926 | Columbus Tigers | 14 | Canton Bulldogs | 2 |
| October 13, 1929 | Green Bay Packers | 14 | Frankford Yellow Jackets | 2 |
| November 28, 1935 | Detroit Lions | 14 | Chicago Bears | 2 |
| September 19, 1937 | Chicago Bears | 14 | Green Bay Packers | 2 |
| November 11, 1962 | Baltimore Colts | 14 | Los Angeles Rams | 2 |
| October 10, 1937 | Chicago Bears | 20 | Cleveland Rams | 2 |
| November 11, 1926 | Providence Steam Roller | 21 | Canton Bulldogs | 2 |
| September 20, 1933 | New York Giants | 23 | Pittsburgh Pirates | 2† |
| September 14, 1963 | Detroit Lions | 23 | Los Angeles Rams | 2 |
| December 17, 1972 | Pittsburgh Steelers | 24 | San Diego Chargers | 2 |
| December 14, 1980 | New England Patriots | 24 | Buffalo Bills | 2 |
| January 8, 2012 | New York Giants | 24 | Atlanta Falcons | 2‡ |
| December 22, 1957 | Pittsburgh Steelers | 27 | Chicago Cardinals | 2 |
| August 18, 2024 | Denver Broncos | 27 | Green Bay Packers | 2* |
| September 8, 2013 | Kansas City Chiefs | 28 | Jacksonville Jaguars | 2 |
| October 11, 1936 | Green Bay Packers | 31 | Boston Redskins | 2 |
| September 19, 1965 | Dallas Cowboys | 31 | New York Giants | 2 |
| December 25, 2024 | Baltimore Ravens | 31 | Houston Texans | 2 |
| September 22, 1968 (AFL) | Kansas City Chiefs | 34 | Denver Broncos | 2 |
| November 6, 1949 (AAFC) | Cleveland Browns | 35 | Chicago Hornets | 2 |
| October 1, 1972 | San Francisco 49ers | 37 | New Orleans Saints | 2 |
| December 5, 1953 | Los Angeles Rams | 45 | Baltimore Colts | 2 |

^ This is the only game in NFL history as of 2025 that has finished with a team scoring a total of exactly four points.
† This was the first ever game for the Pittsburgh Steelers (then the Pirates), who thus scored the franchise's first points on a safety.
‡ This is the only playoff game as of the conclusion of the 2025 postseason where a team scored a total of exactly two points.

*This was a preseason game

== Records ==
The NFL team record for safeties in a game is three, which occurred when the Los Angeles Rams recorded three against the New York Giants on September 30, 1984. All three safeties occurred in the third quarter, so this game also represents the record for safeties scored in a single quarter. The individual record is two, by the Rams' Fred Dryer against the Green Bay Packers on October 21, 1973. Jared Allen, Ted Hendricks, Justin Houston and Doug English share the NFL career record for safeties with four.

League-wide, the record for most safeties scored by all teams in a regular season is 26 in 1988. The fewest safeties scored across the league is 0, occurring in 1943. The season with the greatest frequency of safeties was 1932, with eight safeties in 48 games (one safety every six games). The season with the lowest frequency of safeties, outside of the 1943 season, was 1966, with three safeties in 105 games (one safety every 35 games).

Only three regular-season NFL games have ever ended in overtime with a safety: in 1989 when the Minnesota Vikings defeated the Los Angeles Rams 23–21 when Mike Merriweather blocked a punt into the end zone, in 2004 when the Chicago Bears defeated the Tennessee Titans 19–17 when Billy Volek fumbled in his own end zone and teammate Fred Miller recovered it but was tackled by Adewale Ogunleye in the end zone, and in 2013 when the Miami Dolphins defeated the Cincinnati Bengals 22–20 when Cameron Wake sacked Andy Dalton in the end zone. In a 1989 pre-season game, the New York Jets defeated the host Kansas City Chiefs 15–13 in overtime when Jets defensive lineman Dennis Byrd sacked Chiefs third-string quarterback Mike Elkins in the end zone.

The NCAA does not keep individual statistics for safeties. Prior to the 1978 split of the NCAA's Division I into two subdivisions, there is only one known instance of a Division I team scoring three safeties in a single game: Penn State scored three safeties against Maryland in 1966. Since the NCAA Division I split into Division I-A (now called Division I FBS) and Division I-AA (now called Division I FCS leading up to the 1978 season, there have been three instances of an FBS team scoring three safeties in a game, at least five instances of an FCS team scoring exactly three safeties in a game, and one additional instance of an FCS team scoring four safeties in a game. In the FBS, the following teams scored three safeties in a single game: Arizona State in 1996 (in a 19-0 victory over then-No. 1 and two-time defending national champion Nebraska, ending the Cornhuskers' 26-game winning streak); North Texas in a win over Louisiana-Lafayette (now known as Louisiana) in 2003; and Bowling Green in a win over Miami (Ohio) in 2005. In the FCS, Montana State scored four safeties against Weber State in 2022, all of them on errant snaps out of the end zone, setting an FCS record and tying the overall NCAA record. (Three of those safeties occurred in the first half of the game, which is tied with two other instances for an FCS record for most safeties in one half.) An FCS team scored exactly three safeties in the following games: Alabama State in a win over Division II Albany State in 1988, the University of Massachusetts Amherst in a shutout over Albany in 2005, the University of Massachusetts Amherst scored only six points in a game (from three safeties) against Rhode Island in 2007, Davidson University against Drake University in 2007 (all in one half of the game, which is tied for an FCS record), and Prairie View A&M in a loss to Arkansas-Pine Bluff in 2011 (all in the second quarter, which is an FCS record). In 2004, when Iowa defeated Penn State 6–4, because of Iowa's two field goals and Penn State's two safeties, it was the only instance of such a score in the modern era, and it was the first time since Florida lost to Miami 31–4 in 1987 that a team finished a game with exactly four points. The only other occasion on which a game ended with that score was when Rutgers defeated Princeton in 1869 by six "runs" to four in what is recognized as the first intercollegiate football game.

On October 18, 2025, the University of Virginia broke a late-game tie in a home game against Washington State University with a defensive safety, which proved to be the game-winning score in a 20-22 game.

== Notable safeties ==
=== 1929 Rose Bowl ===
On January 1, 1929, the California Golden Bears faced the Georgia Tech Yellow Jackets at the Rose Bowl in Pasadena, California.

Midway through the second quarter, center Roy Riegels picked up a fumble by Tech's Jack "Stumpy" Thomason 30 yards from the Yellow Jackets' end zone, but was turned around during the play, and ran 69 yards in the wrong direction.

Teammate and quarterback Benny Lom chased Riegels and screamed at him to stop; Lom finally caught up with Riegels at California's 3-yard line and tried to turn him around, but he was hit by a wave of Tech players and thrown back to the 1-yard line.

The Bears chose to punt rather than risk a play so close to their own end zone, but Tech's Vance Maree blocked Lom's punt for a safety, giving Georgia Tech a 2–0 lead. Georgia Tech would ultimately win the game, and their second national championship, by a final score of 8–7. This play is often cited as the worst blunder in the history of college football.

=== The Baugh/Marshall Rule ===
In the first quarter of the 1945 NFL Championship Game, the Washington Redskins had the ball at their own five-yard line. Dropping back into his own end zone, quarterback Sammy Baugh threw for a pass, but the ball hit the goal post (at the time, this was on the goal line instead of at the back of the end zone) and fell to the ground in the end zone. Under the rules at the time, this was ruled as a safety, thus giving the Cleveland Rams a 2–0 lead. The Rams went on to win 15–14, meaning the safety proved to be the margin of victory.

Redskins owner George Preston Marshall was so angry at the outcome that he became a major force in passing the following major rule change after the season: A forward pass that strikes the goal posts is automatically ruled incomplete. This change later became known as the "Baugh/Marshall Rule". The rule was deleted in 1974 when the goalposts were moved to the back of the end zone, thus eliminating the possibility of a forward pass striking them.

=== The wrong way run ===
On October 25, 1964, Minnesota Vikings defensive end Jim Marshall recovered a San Francisco 49ers fumble, but ran 66 yards the wrong way into his own end zone. He subsequently spiked the ball out of the end zone, thinking he had scored a touchdown, only to realize the 49ers were given two points (as he had scored a safety), the first time the offense received points for a 2-point safety in the NFL.

Despite this gaffe, the Vikings won the game 27–22, with the final margin of victory being provided by a Carl Eller touchdown from return of a fumble caused when Marshall sacked 49ers quarterback Billy Kilmer.

=== First one-point safety ===
The first known occurrence of a one-point safety (conversion safety) was in an NCAA game on October 2, 1971, scored by Syracuse in the first quarter of a game at Indiana.

On a point-after-touchdown kick, the ball was kicked almost straight up in the air, and an Indiana player illegally batted the ball in the end zone. A spot foul defensive penalty was called, and Syracuse were awarded a one-point safety, going on to win the game 7-0. The 1970 rulebook (Rule 8-5-3) stated, "If a scrimmage kick fails to cross the neutral zone, or crosses the neutral zone and is first touched by Team B, or is untouched and then rebounds into the end zone where it is recovered by Team A, it is a safety," and (8-5-4) "If the penalty for a foul committed when the ball is free leaves the ball behind a goal line, it is a safety if behind the offender's goal line."

=== Intentional safety gone awry ===
On November 21, 1998, Notre Dame hosted LSU in a college game. With Notre Dame leading 39–34 in the final seconds, their head coach Bob Davie ordered quarterback Jarious Jackson to kneel down in his own end zone after time had expired. However, just as Jackson knelt down to take the intentional safety, a pair of LSU defenders hit him and sprained his right MCL. Ranked No. 10 with a 9–1 record, Notre Dame needed just one more win at unranked USC to clinch a BCS bowl game, but the Irish failed to score a point with two back-up quarterbacks at the helm in an eventual 10–0 loss. Notre Dame settled for a bid to the Gator Bowl, and lost that game 35–28 to No. 17 Georgia Tech.

=== "Impetus" safeties lead to 2001 rule change ===
Before the 2001 NFL season, a safety was awarded when a defensive player's momentum or impetus in recovering a fumble carried him into his own end zone; on the other hand, if that same defender was intercepting a pass and his momentum carried him into the end zone, the ball would then be spotted at the point where the interception occurred. The former scenario happened twice during the 2000 season:

On September 17, the Carolina Panthers were trailing the Atlanta Falcons, 13–10, with 2:12 remaining in the fourth quarter. Falcons running back Jamal Anderson ran 42 yards to the Carolina 16-yard line before he was stripped by Panthers defensive back Doug Evans. Evans then grabbed the fumble at the 2-yard line, but his momentum carried him through the side of his own end zone. The play was ruled a safety, and the Falcons held on to win, 15–10. After the game, Panthers head coach George Seifert told reporters that he was confused by the call, saying, "from what I understand right now, it's a different rule than it is if you intercept the ball and momentum carries you into the end zone than it is for a fumble recovery ... That is something that possibly would be looked into with the Competition Committee".

Then on December 16, the Seattle Seahawks trailed the Oakland Raiders, 24–19, in the fourth quarter in a game played in a rainstorm at Husky Stadium. Seahawks running back Ricky Watters ran 53 yards to the Oakland 28-yard line, before he was stripped of the ball by the Raiders' Charles Woodson. In the ensuing scramble for recovery, the ball was batted multiple times toward the Oakland goal line. Raiders safety Marquez Pope eventually recovered the ball at the Oakland 2-yard line, but with the wet field, his momentum caused him to slide into the Oakland end zone before being touched. This play was also ruled a safety, and with the score now 24–21, the Seahawks then rallied for a late touchdown and a 27-24 victory. Just like Seifert did during the Falcons-Panthers game, Raiders head coach Jon Gruden complained about the safety call.

The losses were costly to both teams. The Panthers were never able to sustain any momentum after that early season loss and finished, out of the playoffs, with a 7–9 record. The Raiders' loss dropped them to 11–4 and eliminated them from contention for the AFC's first seed. The Raiders did clinch the AFC West division, but ultimately lost to the Baltimore Ravens, the eventual Super Bowl XXXV champions, in the AFC Championship Game.

The following season, the NFL modified the rules so that fumble recoveries, as well as interceptions, would now be awarded at the spot of the recovery, not where the player's momentum carries him (even into his own end zone).

=== Intentional safety leads to win ===
On November 3, 2003, the New England Patriots trailed the host Denver Broncos 24-23 with 2:51 remaining in the game. Facing a 4th and 10 from their own 1-yard line, Patriots coach Bill Belichick chose to give up an intentional safety rather than punt from the end line. Long snapper Lonie Paxton purposefully snapped the ball over the head of punter Ken Walter and out the back of the end zone, giving the Broncos a 26-23 lead.

With three timeouts at the Patriots' disposal and the two-minute warning, along with the league's top-ranked defense, the ensuing free kick to the Broncos from the 20-yard line essentially gained 30 yards in field position. On the ensuing possession after the free kick, the Broncos failed to convert a first down.

After a Broncos punt, the Patriots began possession from their own 42-yard line with 2:15 remaining. A Tom Brady 18-yard touchdown pass to David Givens with 36 seconds remaining gave the Patriots a 30-26 win.

=== Dan Orlovsky blunder ===
On October 12, 2008, in a game against the Minnesota Vikings, Detroit Lions quarterback Dan Orlovsky, scrambling with the ball in his own end zone after having lined up in a shotgun formation, inadvertently stepped on the end line. He was therefore out of bounds from the end zone, resulting in a safety for Minnesota. When the officials blew their whistles, Orlovsky did not know why the play was being stopped. According to Tom Pedula in USA Today, Orlovsky said, "When they started blowing the whistle, I was like, 'Did we false start or were they offsides or something?' Then I looked and I was like, 'You are an idiot.'" The two points proved to be the difference in a 12–10 Vikings victory, while the media labeled the play as emblematic of the Lions' struggles during their eventual 0–16 season.

A nearly identical play took place on September 25, 2022, when San Francisco 49ers quarterback Jimmy Garoppolo, under pressure from Denver Broncos pass rushers Mike Purcell and Randy Gregory, backpedaled in his own end zone and accidentally stepped on the end line. NBC broadcaster Mike Tirico immediately referenced the Orlovsky play in his description. Orlovsky posted a tweet a few moments later stating "IVE NEVER BEEN HAPPIER / FFFFREEEEEDDDOOOMMMM". The safety was the margin of difference in the Broncos' 11-10 win over the 49ers.

On September 24, 2023, Indianapolis Colts backup quarterback Gardner Minshew “scored” an Orlovsky in the final minutes of a game against the Baltimore Ravens. The Colts went on to ultimately win the game 22-19, becoming the first team to win a game with an Orlovsky scored against them.

=== Instant replay oddity ===
On October 5, 2009, the Green Bay Packers faced the host Minnesota Vikings on Monday Night Football. The Packers trailed the Vikings 28–14 midway through the fourth quarter. With the ball at the Green Bay one-yard line, the Packers attempted a pass from their own end zone.

Vikings defensive end Jared Allen grabbed Packers quarterback Aaron Rodgers from behind for a sack, with Rodgers appearing to fumble the ball at the one-yard line and Allen recovering. Referee Gene Steratore ruled Vikings possession inside the one-yard line. Packers head coach Mike McCarthy challenged the play and asserted that Rodgers' knee was down in his own end zone before the fumble, asking Steratore to award the Vikings a safety and increase their lead to 30–14.

Strategically, the move made sense: the Vikings would have a 16-point lead (still a two-possession game: two touchdowns and two two-point conversions), and the Packers would be allowed to free kick from their own 20-yard line. Had McCarthy not challenged, the score would have remained 28–14, but the Vikings would have almost assuredly increased their lead to a three-possession game with a field goal or touchdown.

Steratore reversed his own ruling and awarded a safety to the Vikings. The Packers added a touchdown (missing a two-point conversion) and a field goal to lose by 30–23.

=== A four-point quarter ===
On Sunday, November 6, 2011, the St. Louis Rams posted the first four-point quarter in NFL history. Leading 9–6 in the third quarter, the Rams' James Hall sacked Arizona quarterback John Skelton in the end zone for the first safety. The Rams' next possession ended in a punt, then, on the Cardinals' first subsequent play from scrimmage, Skelton was flagged for intentional grounding in the end zone. The Rams did not score in the remainder of the quarter, thus scoring a total four points in that quarter. The Rams lost in overtime, 19–13.

=== Safety, not touchback ===
On January 1, 2012, the Detroit Lions opened up the scoring in the first quarter with a touchdown, in a game against the Green Bay Packers.

On the ensuing kickoff, Packers returner Patrick Lee muffed the ball in his own end zone. The ball bounced off of Lee and left the end zone, still in bounds. Lee, not realizing the ball had fully cleared the goal line, reached over the goal line and brought the ball back into the end zone, where he took a knee for what he thought was a touchback.

After discussion among the officials and a replay challenge by Green Bay, the Lions were credited with a safety and a 9–0 lead. Green Bay would however rally to win, 45–41.

A similar situation happened (again, in the NFL) on September 8, 2013, when the Tennessee Titans' Darius Reynaud, in the very first play of his team's regular season, fielded the Pittsburgh Steelers' opening kickoff and took a short step backwards (into the end zone) for what was ruled to be a safety, not a touchback, because the ball was not in the end zone when it was fielded. Tennessee won the game 16-9.

=== Rule exploitation ===
On November 27, 2016, the Baltimore Ravens were leading the Cincinnati Bengals 19-12 with eleven seconds left in the game. Baltimore was on fourth down and came out in punt formation, but chose not to punt, instead having Ravens punter Sam Koch backpedal and stall in order to waste the remaining eleven seconds before running through the back of the end zone for a safety.

While Koch was killing off time on the clock, his teammates were doing everything to keep the Bengals from coming close to him, with the Ravens special teams unit blatantly holding and even tackling defenders (which resulted in several flags being thrown). Time ran out, and after the play ended the officials came together to discuss penalties. NFL rules are such that the game would be extended for one more play after a defensive penalty, but on offensive penalties, there is no extension, and since Baltimore had possession on this play, all of the holding penalties called were offensive. The intentional safety was counted, ending the game with a 19-14 Ravens win.

This had been the second time the Ravens used this play, with the first time coming in Super Bowl XLVII against the 49ers three years before. In that play however, the Ravens could not run out the clock all the way, requiring them to free kick to San Francisco with four seconds left. Time ran out on the following 49ers failed return, with the Ravens winning 34-31.

As a result of this incident, the NFL passed a rule the following season: if a team commits multiple fouls on the same down with the intent of manipulating the game clock, the game clock will be reset and the team will receive a 15 yard penalty for unsportsmanlike conduct.

=== Free kick strategy ===
On November 1, 2020, the Dallas Cowboys trailed the host Philadelphia Eagles 21-9 after an Eagles touchdown with 5:18 remaining.

With third-string quarterback Ben DiNucci in the game, the Cowboys' next three plays lost 12 yards, resulting in a 4th-and-22 from their own 11-yard line. Needing two scores to win the game and with a challenging fourth down to convert, the Cowboys chose to execute an intentional safety for the strategic purpose of using the ensuing free kick as an onside kick.

Long snapper L. P. Ladouceur purposefully snapped the ball over the head of Chris Jones and through the back of the end zone, giving the Eagles a 23-9 lead. On the following free kick, kicker Greg Zuerlein attempted an innovative onside kick. He punted the ball short and very high in the air.

The Eagles failed to catch the ball on the fly, resulting in a huge bounce and a scramble for possession; ultimately, the Eagles recovered and won the game 23-9.

=== Completed pass for a safety ===
On September 26, 2021, the Miami Dolphins led the Las Vegas Raiders 14-0 late in the first quarter.

After an A. J. Cole III punt was downed at the Dolphins' one-yard line by Raider Zay Jones, the Dolphins' first play from scrimmage was a designed swing pass to the left flat thrown by Jacoby Brissett to Jaylen Waddle. Waddle caught the pass approximately two yards behind the goal line in his own end zone, but was immediately tackled by Raiders cornerback Casey Hayward for a safety.

According to Pro-Football-Reference.com, this was the first safety in NFL history on a completed pass that did not include a penalty or fumble on the play. The safety earned the Raiders their first points en route to a 31-28 victory in overtime.

=== Overtime walkoff safeties ===
Under the original NFL overtime rules in 1974, any score by either team in overtime would win the game ("sudden death" for the loser). The rules were modified in 2012: the first team to possess the ball in overtime wins immediately if they score a touchdown, and the team that kicks off to them at the beginning of overtime wins immediately if they score a safety (or better). There have been only three walkoff safety wins in overtime in NFL history:

- Minnesota Vikings 23, Los Angeles Rams 21 (November 5, 1989)
- Chicago Bears 19, Tennessee Titans 17 (November 14, 2004)
- Miami Dolphins 22, Cincinnati Bengals 20 (October 31, 2013)

On September 8, 2002, an overtime safety nearly occurred in a matchup between the Tampa Bay Buccaneers and New Orleans Saints.

Late in overtime, Tampa Bay was pinned back at their own 5-yard line. Tom Tupa attempted to punt on fourth down from the endzone, but Saints defender Fred McAfee was unblocked. As Tupa was being tackled, he attempted a shovel pass in desperation to John Howell from his non-throwing arm. The ball was intercepted by James Allen, who stood in the confines of the endzone for a game-winning touchdown.

On January 17, 2026, in overtime, a walk-off safety for the Broncos was not called (NFL Rule 11, Section 5, Article 1a). Replay showed a fairly obvious holding penalty was not called on the Bills when quarterback Josh Allen was in the endzone. Since both teams had possessed the ball in overtime, the safety would have won the game for the Broncos (who later on did win 33-30). The last 20 minutes of game time were marred by several controversial calls and non-calls, and this one is at risk of being overshadowed and forgotten.

=== Super Bowl safeties ===
To date, a safety has been scored in the Super Bowl nine times, or once every 6.6 Super Bowls, with both the Pittsburgh Steelers and New York Giants being involved in three such instances, each scoring a safety in two instances and giving up a safety in another.

Safeties have occurred in back-to-back Super Bowls in two instances, and three straight Super Bowls in one instance: Super Bowl IX and Super Bowl X; Super Bowl XX and Super Bowl XXI; and Super Bowl XLVI, Super Bowl XLVII and Super Bowl XLVIII.

The longest drought between Super Bowl safeties is eighteen years (between Super Bowl XXV to Super Bowl XLIII), while the shortest time between Super Bowl safeties is sixteen seconds of gameplay, between the final play from scrimmage in Super Bowl XLVII and the first play from scrimmage in Super Bowl XLVIII. No safety has yet been scored in the third quarter of any Super Bowl.

==== Super Bowl IX ====
The first half of Super Bowl IX between the Pittsburgh Steelers and Minnesota Vikings was a defensive struggle, with the only score made on a second quarter safety by the Steelers. Defensive end Dwight White tackled Vikings quarterback Fran Tarkenton in the end zone as Tarkenton attempted to recover a Dave Osborn fumble, which had been kicked toward the goal line by Steeler L. C. Greenwood. The Steelers led at halftime 2-0, and went on to win 16–6.

==== Super Bowl X ====
The Pittsburgh Steelers trailed the Dallas Cowboys 10–7 early in the fourth quarter of Super Bowl X when Dallas punter Mitch Hoopes was forced to punt from inside his own goal line.

As Hoopes stepped up to make the kick, Steelers running back Reggie Harrison broke through the line and blocked the punt. The ball went through the end zone for a safety, cutting Dallas' lead to 10–9; the Steelers built on the momentum from this play and became repeat Super Bowl champions with a 21–17 victory.

==== Super Bowl XX ====
In the fourth quarter of Super Bowl XX, the Chicago Bears scored a safety against the New England Patriots when Bears defensive lineman Henry Waechter sacked Patriots backup quarterback Steve Grogan in the end zone.

The Bears dominated the game on both sides of the ball, especially in the second half, and won 46–10. The safety was the last score of the game made by either team.

==== Super Bowl XXI ====
In the second quarter of Super Bowl XXI, the New York Giants scored a safety against the Denver Broncos when Giants defensive end George Martin sacked Broncos quarterback John Elway in the end zone, cutting the Broncos' lead to 10–9. The Giants, who had been ahead earlier, would retake the lead and win the game 39–20.

==== Super Bowl XXV ====
In the second quarter of Super Bowl XXV between the Buffalo Bills and the New York Giants, the Bills scored a safety when their defensive end Bruce Smith sacked Giants quarterback Jeff Hostetler in the end zone, giving the Bills a 12–3 lead.

Smith nearly forced a fumble from Hostetler on the sack, but Hostetler held onto the ball to ensure only two points were surrendered instead of a potential six. Buffalo ultimately lost the game 20–19 after a missed field goal.

==== Super Bowl XLIII ====
In the fourth quarter of Super Bowl XLIII between the Steelers and the Arizona Cardinals, Steelers center Justin Hartwig committed a holding penalty in the Steelers' own end zone, wiping out a 20-yard pass from Ben Roethlisberger to Santonio Holmes on third-and-10.

The automatic safety cut the Steelers' lead to 20–16. On the Cardinals' ensuing drive after the free kick,Larry Fitzgerald caught a 63-yard touchdown pass by Kurt Warner, putting Pittsburgh behind 23–20. However, Pittsburgh went on to win 27–23. It was the first time in a Super Bowl that a safety was the result of a penalty.

==== Super Bowl XLVI ====
In the first quarter of Super Bowl XLVI between the Giants and the New England Patriots, New England quarterback Tom Brady was penalized for intentional grounding in his own end zone.

While under pressure from the Giants, Brady threw the ball toward the center of the field, beyond where any players were. Even though the ball crossed the line of scrimmage, Brady was still in the passer's pocket when he released the ball, making the deliberate overthrow an intentional grounding. The Giants went on to win 21–17.

==== Super Bowl XLVII ====
In the fourth quarter of Super Bowl XLVII between the Baltimore Ravens and the San Francisco 49ers, with the Ravens ahead 34–29 and having the ball with twelve seconds remaining, punter Sam Koch ran the clock for eight seconds in the end zone before running out of bounds for a 49ers safety.

Had Koch turned the ball over in the end zone, the six points would have put San Francisco ahead 35-34; therefore, he ran out of bounds before being under any real pressure. Baltimore would go on to win the game 34–31, with the 49ers unable to return the ball in the remaining four seconds.

==== Super Bowl XLVIII ====
On the first play from scrimmage of Super Bowl XLVIII between the Seattle Seahawks and the Denver Broncos, Broncos quarterback Peyton Manning was shifting forward from shotgun formation when the ball was snapped past him. It was then recovered in the Broncos' end zone by Denver halfback Knowshon Moreno, who was tackled by Cliff Avril.

While this prevented a Seattle touchdown, it resulted in a 2-0 lead for the Seahawks. This became the fastest score in a Super Bowl, as just twelve seconds ticked off the clock before the safety occurred. While a penalty was called against Manning for illegal motion, it was declined. The Seahawks won the game 43-8.

== See also ==
- American football rules
- Field goal
