= 1995 San Diego Toreros football team =

American college football season

1995 San Diego Toreros football
- Conference: Pioneer Football League
- Record: 5–5 (3–2 PFL)
- Head coach: Brian Fogarty (13th season)
- Home stadium: Torero Stadium

1995 Pioneer Football League standings
	Conf.					Overall
Team	W		L		T	W		L		T
Drake $	5	–	0	–	0	8	–	1	–	1
Dayton	4	–	1	–	0	9	–	2	–	0
San Diego	3	–	2	–	0	5	–	5	–	0
Evansville	1	–	4	–	0	5	–	5	–	0
Valparaiso	1	–	4	–	0	5	–	5	–	0
Butler	1	–	4	–	0	2	–	8	–	0
$ – Conference champion

The 1995 San Diego Toreros football team represented the University of San Diego as a member of the Pioneer Football League (PFL) during the 1995 NCAA Division I-AA football season. The team was led by 13th-year head coach Brian Fogarty and played their home games at the Torero Stadium in San Diego. The Toreros compiled an overall record of 5–5, with a mark of 3–2 in conference play, and finished third in the PFL.

== Schedule ==
Date	Opponent	Site	Result	Attendance	Source
September 2	Chico State*	Torero Stadium; San Diego, CA	L 13–20	3,471	
September 9	at Dayton	Welcome Stadium; Dayton, OH	L 3–30	7,735	
September 23	at Cal Lutheran*	Mount Clef Stadium; Thousand Oaks, CA	W 28–21		
September 30	at Valparaiso	Brown Field; Valparaiso, IN	W 35–18		
October 7	Azusa Pacific*	Torero Stadium; San Diego, CA	W 21–0	4,000	
October 14	at Evansville	Arad McCutchan Stadium; Evansville, IN	W 19–17		
October 21	at Redlands*	Ted Runner Stadium; Redlands, CA	L 3–16		
October 28	Drake	Torero Stadium; San Diego, CA	L 0–9	2,871	
November 4	Butler	Torero Stadium; San Diego, CA	W 37–16		
November 11	Wagner*	Torero Stadium; San Diego, CA	L 17–21	4,038	
*Non-conference game
