= 1994 San Diego Toreros football team =

American college football season

1994 San Diego Toreros football
- Conference: Pioneer Football League
- Record: 6–4 (2–3 PFL)
- Head coach: Brian Fogarty (12th season)
- Home stadium: Torero Stadium

1994 Pioneer Football League standings
	Conf.			Overall
Team	W		L	W		L
Dayton +	4	–	1	8	–	2
Butler +	4	–	1	7	–	3
Drake	3	–	2	7	–	3
Valparaiso	2	–	3	7	–	3
San Diego	2	–	3	6	–	4
Evansville	0	–	5	4	–	6
+ – Conference co-champions

The 1994 San Diego Toreros football team represented the University of San Diego as a member of the Pioneer Football League (PFL) during the 1994 NCAA Division I-AA football season. The team was led by 12th-year head coach Brian Fogarty and played their home games at the Torero Stadium in San Diego. The Toreros compiled an overall record of 6–4, with a mark of 2–3 in conference play, and finished tied for fourth in the PFL.

== Schedule ==
Date	Opponent	Site	Result	Attendance	Source
September 3	at Menlo*	Connor Field; Atherton, CA	W 37–14		
September 10	Saint Mary's*	Torero Stadium; San Diego, CA	L 21–52		
September 17	at Drake	Drake Stadium; Des Moines, IA	L 9–14		
September 24	Cal Lutheran*	Torero Stadium; San Diego, CA	W 29–24		
October 1	Valparaiso	Torero Stadium; San Diego, CA	W 33–27	4,000	
October 8	at Wagner*	Fischer Memorial Stadium; Staten Island, NY	W 45–35	1,446	
October 15	Evansville	Torero Stadium; San Diego, CA	W 28–16	4,000	
October 22	at Butler	Butler Bowl; Indianapolis, IN	L 21–38	2,890	
November 5	at Azusa Pacific*	Citrus Stadium; Glendora, CA	W 49–21	1,934	
November 12	Dayton	Torero Stadium; San Diego, CA	L 24–42		
*Non-conference game
