= 1995 Evansville Purple Aces football team =

American college football season

1995 Evansville Purple Aces football
- Conference: Pioneer Football League
- Record: 5–5 (1–4 PFL)
- Head coach: Robin Cooper (5th season)
- Home stadium: Arad McCutchan Stadium

1995 Pioneer Football League standings
	Conf.					Overall
Team	W		L		T	W		L		T
Drake $	5	–	0	–	0	8	–	1	–	1
Dayton	4	–	1	–	0	9	–	2	–	0
San Diego	3	–	2	–	0	5	–	5	–	0
Evansville	1	–	4	–	0	5	–	5	–	0
Valparaiso	1	–	4	–	0	5	–	5	–	0
Butler	1	–	4	–	0	2	–	8	–	0
$ – Conference champion

The 1995 Evansville Purple Aces football team represented the University of Evansville as a member of the Pioneer Football League (PFL) during the 1995 NCAA Division I-AA football season. The team was led by fifth-year head coach Robin Cooper and played their home games at the Arad McCutchan Stadium in Evansville, Indiana. The Purple Aces compiled an overall record of 5–5, with a mark of 1–4 in conference play, and finished tied for fourth in the PFL.

== Schedule ==
Date	Time	Opponent	Site	Result	Attendance	Source
September 2		Kentucky Wesleyan*	Arad McCutchan Stadium; Evansville, IN	W 42–12		
September 9		Cumberland (TN)*	Arad McCutchan Stadium; Evansville, IN	W 27–7		
September 16		at Greenville (IL)*	Francis Field; Greenville, IL	W 28–0		
September 23		at Thomas More*	Lockland H.S. Stadium; Lockland, OH	L 14–16		
October 7	1:00 p.m.	at Drake	Drake Stadium; Des Moines, IA	L 6–23	4,170	
October 14		San Diego	Arad McCutchan Stadium; Evansville, IN	L 17–19		
October 21		at Valparaiso	Brown Field; Valparaiso, IN	W 7–6		
October 28		Butler	Arad McCutchan Stadium; Evansville, IN	L 13–14		
November 4		Dayton	Arad McCutchan Stadium; Evansville, IN	L 10–36	879	
November 11		at Aurora*	Spartan Stadium; Aurora, IL	W 18–6		
*Non-conference game; All times are in Central time
