= 1994 Dayton Flyers football team =

American college football season

1994 Dayton Flyers football

PFL co-champion
- Conference: Pioneer Football League
- Record: 8–2 (4–1 PFL)
- Head coach: Mike Kelly (14th season)
- Home stadium: Welcome Stadium

1994 Pioneer Football League standings
| | Conf. | | | Overall |
| Team | W | | L | W | | L |
|---|---|---|---|---|---|---|
| Dayton + | 4 | – | 1 | 8 | – | 2 |
| Butler + | 4 | – | 1 | 7 | – | 3 |
| Drake | 3 | – | 2 | 7 | – | 3 |
| Valparaiso | 2 | – | 3 | 7 | – | 3 |
| San Diego | 2 | – | 3 | 6 | – | 4 |
| Evansville | 0 | – | 5 | 4 | – | 6 |
+ – Conference co-champions

The 1994 Dayton Flyers football team represented the University of Dayton as a member of the Pioneer Football League (PFL) during the 1994 NCAA Division I-AA football season. The team was led by 14th-year head coach Mike Kelly and played their home games at Welcome Stadium in Dayton, Ohio. The Flyers compiled an overall record of 8–2, with a mark of 4–1 in conference play, and finished as PFL co-champion.

== Schedule ==
| Date | Opponent | Site | Result | Attendance | Source |
|---|---|---|---|---|---|
| September 3 | Mount St. Joseph* | Welcome Stadium; Dayton, OH | W 50–14 | 7,631 | |
| September 10 | UAB* | Welcome Stadium; Dayton, OH | L 10–28 | 10,112 | |
| September 24 | at Georgetown (KY)* | Hinton Field; Georgetown, KY | W 32–29 | 3,500 | |
| October 1 | Evansville | Welcome Stadium; Dayton, OH | W 24–0 | 8,810 | |
| October 8 | Wilmington (OH)* | Welcome Stadium; Dayton, OH | W 42–17 | 5,954 | |
| October 15 | at Butler | Butler Bowl; Indianapolis, IN | L 24–31 | 9,018 | |
| October 22 | Drake | Welcome Stadium; Dayton, OH | W 24–7 | | |
| October 29 | at Valparaiso | Brown Field; Valparaiso, IN | W 30–13 | | |
| November 5 | Concordia (St. Paul)* | Welcome Stadium; Dayton, OH | W 50–7 | 5,473 | |
| November 12 | at San Diego | Torero Stadium; San Diego, CA | W 42–24 | | |
*Non-conference game
