= 1994 Evansville Purple Aces football team =

American college football season

1994 Evansville Purple Aces football
- Conference: Pioneer Football League
- Record: 4–6 (0–5 PFL)
- Head coach: Robin Cooper (4th season)
- Home stadium: Arad McCutchan Stadium

1994 Pioneer Football League standings
	Conf.			Overall
Team	W		L	W		L
Dayton +	4	–	1	8	–	2
Butler +	4	–	1	7	–	3
Drake	3	–	2	7	–	3
Valparaiso	2	–	3	7	–	3
San Diego	2	–	3	6	–	4
Evansville	0	–	5	4	–	6
+ – Conference co-champions

The 1994 Evansville Purple Aces football team represented the University of Evansville as a member of the Pioneer Football League (PFL) during the 1994 NCAA Division I-AA football season. The team was led by fourth-year head coach Robin Cooper and played their home games at the Arad McCutchan Stadium in Evansville, Indiana. The Purple Aces compiled an overall record of 4–6, with a mark of 0–5 in conference play, and finished sixth in the PFL.

== Schedule ==
Date	Opponent	Site	Result	Attendance	Source
September 3	Wittenberg*	Arad McCutchan Stadium; Evansville, IN	W 14–13		
September 10	Thomas More*	Arad McCutchan Stadium; Evansville, IN	L 22–29		
September 17	at Kentucky Wesleyan*	Apollo Stadium; Owensboro, KY	W 35–27	600	
October 1	at Dayton	Welcome Stadium; Dayton, OH	L 0–24	8,810	
October 8	Drake	Arad McCutchan Stadium; Evansville, IN	L 21–31		
October 15	at San Diego	Torero Stadium; San Diego, CA	L 16–28	4,000	
October 22	Valparaiso	Arad McCutchan Stadium; Evansville, IN	L 21–34		
October 29	at Butler	Butler Bowl; Indianapolis, IN	L 14–49		
November 5	at Cumberland (TN)*	Lindsey Donnell Stadium; Lebanon, TN	W 33–32		
November 12	Aurora*	Arad McCutchan Stadium; Evansville, IN	W 42–21		
*Non-conference game
