= 1994 Butler Bulldogs football team =

American college football season

1994 Butler Bulldogs football

PFL co-champion
- Conference: Pioneer Football League
- Record: 7–3 (4–1 PFL)
- Head coach: Ken LaRose (3rd season)
- Home stadium: Butler Bowl

1994 Pioneer Football League standings
	Conf.			Overall
Team	W		L	W		L
Dayton +	4	–	1	8	–	2
Butler +	4	–	1	7	–	3
Drake	3	–	2	7	–	3
Valparaiso	2	–	3	7	–	3
San Diego	2	–	3	6	–	4
Evansville	0	–	5	4	–	6
+ – Conference co-champions

The 1994 Butler Bulldogs football team represented Butler University as a member of the Pioneer Football League (PFL) during the 1994 NCAA Division I-AA football season. The team was led by third-year head coach Ken LaRose and played their home games at the Butler Bowl in Indianapolis. The Bulldogs compiled an overall record of 7–3, with a mark of 4–1 in conference play, and finished as PFL co-champion.

== Schedule ==
Date	Opponent	Site	Result	Attendance	Source
September 3	Hofstra*	Butler Bowl; Indianapolis, IN	L 0–41	5,402	
September 10	at Saint Xavier*	Deaton Field; Chicago, IL	W 42–6		
September 17	Georgetown (KY)*	Butler Bowl; Indianapolis, IN	W 31–21		
September 24	at Wisconsin–Stevens Point*	Goerke Field; Stevens Point, WI	W 28–16		
October 1	at Drake	Drake Stadium; Des Moines, IA	W 28–20		
October 8	at Valparaiso	Brown Field; Valparaiso, IN	L 14–20		
October 15	Dayton	Butler Bowl; Indianapolis, IN	W 31–24	9,018	
October 22	San Diego	Butler Bowl; Indianapolis, IN	W 38–21	2,890	
October 29	Evansville	Butler Bowl; Indianapolis, IN	W 49–14		
November 5	at UAB*	Legion Field; Birmingham, AL	L 14–19	20,237	
*Non-conference game
