= Ken LaRose =

American football Player

Current position
- Title: Associate AD for development
- Team: Butler
- Conference: Big East

Playing career
- 1977–1979: Butler
- Position: Offensive lineman

Coaching career (HC unless noted)
- 1980–1983: Roncalli HS (IN) (OL)
- 1984–1991: Butler (assistant)
- 1992–2001: Butler

Administrative career (AD unless noted)
- 2013–present: Butler (assoc. AD for development)

Head coaching record
- Overall: 46–54

Accomplishments and honors

Championships
- 1 MIFC (1992); 1 PFL (1994)

Ken LaRose is an American college athletics administrator and former football player and coach. He is the associate athletic director for development as Butler University in Indianapolis, Indiana. LaRose served as the head football coach at Butler from 1992 to 2001, compiling a record of 46–54.

== Head coaching record ==
Year	Team	Overall	Conference	Standing	Bowl/playoffs
Butler Bulldogs (Midwest Intercollegiate Football Conference) (1992)
1992	Butler	8–2	8–2	T–1st	
Butler Bulldogs (Pioneer Football League) (1993–2001)
1993	Butler	4–6	3–2	T–2nd	
1994	Butler	7–3	4–1	T–1st	
1995	Butler	2–8	1–4	T–4th	
1996	Butler	3–7	2–3	T–3rd	
1997	Butler	6–4	2–3	T–3rd	
1998	Butler	4–6	1–3	4th	
1999	Butler	5–5	0–4	5th	
2000	Butler	2–8	0–4	5th	
2001	Butler	5–5	2–2	T–2nd (North)	
Butler:		46–54	23–28		
Total:		46–54			
National championship Conference title Conference division title or championship game berth
