= 1995 Valparaiso Crusaders football team =

American college football season

1995 Valparaiso Crusaders football
- Conference: Pioneer Football League
- Record: 5–5 (1–4 PFL)
- Head coach: Tom Horne (7th season)
- Home stadium: Brown Field

1995 Pioneer Football League standings
| | Conf. | | | | | Overall |
| Team | W | | L | | T | W | | L | | T |
|---|---|---|---|---|---|---|---|---|---|---|
| Drake $ | 5 | – | 0 | – | 0 | 8 | – | 1 | – | 1 |
| Dayton | 4 | – | 1 | – | 0 | 9 | – | 2 | – | 0 |
| San Diego | 3 | – | 2 | – | 0 | 5 | – | 5 | – | 0 |
| Evansville | 1 | – | 4 | – | 0 | 5 | – | 5 | – | 0 |
| Valparaiso | 1 | – | 4 | – | 0 | 5 | – | 5 | – | 0 |
| Butler | 1 | – | 4 | – | 0 | 2 | – | 8 | – | 0 |
$ – Conference champion

The 1995 Valparaiso Crusaders football team represented the Valparaiso University as a member of the Pioneer Football League (PFL) during the 1995 NCAA Division I-AA football season. The team was led by seventh-year head coach Tom Horne and played their home games at the Brown Field in Valparaiso, Indiana. The Crusaders compiled an overall record of 5–5, with a mark of 1–4 in conference play, and finished tied for fourth in the PFL.

== Schedule ==
| Date | Time | Opponent | Site | Result | Attendance | Source |
|---|---|---|---|---|---|---|
| September 9 | | at Saint Xavier* | Deaton Field; Chicago, IL | W 41–30 | | |
| September 16 | | Wisconsin–Whitewater* | Brown Field; Valparaiso, IN | L 0–47 | | |
| September 23 | | at Kalamazoo* | Angell Field; Kalamazoo, MI | W 47–39 | | |
| September 30 | | San Diego | Brown Field; Valparaiso, IN | L 18–35 | | |
| October 7 | | at Butler | Butler Bowl; Indianapolis, IN | W 44–42 | | |
| October 14 | 1:00 p.m. | Drake | Brown Field; Valparaiso, IN | L 21–28 | 1,713 | |
| October 21 | | Evansville | Brown Field; Valparaiso, IN | L 6–7 | | |
| October 28 | | at Dayton | Welcome Stadium; Dayton, OH | L 14–44 | | |
| November 4 | | at Aurora* | Spartan Stadium; Aurora, IL | W 20–15 | | |
| November 11 | | Kentucky Wesleyan* | Brown Field; Valparaiso, IN | W 36–27 | 232 | |
*Non-conference game; All times are in Eastern time
