= 1995 Dayton Flyers football team =

American college football season

1995 Dayton Flyers football
- Conference: Pioneer Football League
- Record: 9–2 (4–1 PFL)
- Head coach: Mike Kelly (15th season)
- Home stadium: Welcome Stadium

1995 Pioneer Football League standings
	Conf.					Overall
Team	W		L		T	W		L		T
Drake $	5	–	0	–	0	8	–	1	–	1
Dayton	4	–	1	–	0	9	–	2	–	0
San Diego	3	–	2	–	0	5	–	5	–	0
Evansville	1	–	4	–	0	5	–	5	–	0
Valparaiso	1	–	4	–	0	5	–	5	–	0
Butler	1	–	4	–	0	2	–	8	–	0
$ – Conference champion

The 1995 Dayton Flyers football team represented the University of Dayton as a member of the Pioneer Football League (PFL) during the 1995 NCAA Division I-AA football season. The team was led by 15th-year head coach Mike Kelly and played their home games at Welcome Stadium in Dayton, Ohio. The Flyers compiled an overall record of 9–2, with a mark of 4–1 in conference play, and finished second in the PFL.

== Schedule ==
Date	Opponent	Site	Result	Attendance	Source
September 2	Albany*	Welcome Stadium; Dayton, OH	W 40–14	4,482	
September 9	San Diego	Welcome Stadium; Dayton, OH	W 30–3	7,735	
September 16	Towson State*	Welcome Stadium; Dayton, OH	W 38–0	3,761	
September 23	at Wisconsin–Platteville*	Ralph E. Davis Pioneer Stadium; Platteville, WI	W 28–7	1,399	
September 30	Georgetown (KY)*^{†}	Welcome Stadium; Dayton, OH	W 55–30	8,592	
October 14	Butler	Welcome Stadium; Dayton, OH	W 49–13		
October 21	at Drake	Drake Stadium; Des Moines, IA (rivalry)	L 23–34	5,105	
October 28	Valparaiso	Welcome Stadium; Dayton, OH	W 44–14		
November 4	at Evansville	Arad McCutchan Stadium; Evansville, IN	W 36–10	879	
November 11	West Virginia State*	Welcome Stadium; Dayton, OH	W 55–0	2,732	
November 18	at Wofford*	Synder Field; Spartanburg, SC	L 24–55		
*Non-conference game; ^{†}Homecoming
