= Robin Cooper (American football) =

Coaching career (HC unless noted)
- 1985–1986: MacMurray
- 1988: Western Illinois (assistant)
- 1991–1997: Evansville
- 1999–2000: DuPage
- 2001–2005: North Park

Head coaching record
- Overall: 51–83 (college)

Robin Cooper is an American former football coach. He served as the head football coach at MacMurray College in Jacksonville, Illinois from 1985 to 1985, at the University of Evansville in Evansville, Indiana from 1991 to 1997, and at North Park University in Chicago from 2001 to 2005, compiling a career college football coaching record of 51–83.

== Head coaching record ==
=== College ===
| Year | Team | Overall | Conference | Standing | Bowl/playoffs |
|---|---|---|---|---|---|
MacMurray Highlanders (NCAA Division III independent) (1985–1986)
| 1985 | MacMurray | 2–4 | | | |
| 1986 | MacMurray | 6–3 | | | |
| MacMurray: | | 8–7 | | | |
Evansville Purple Aces (Mid-South Conference) (1991)
| 1991 | Evansville | 5–5 | 3–3 | T–3rd | |
Evansville Purple Aces (NCAA Division III independent) (1992)
| 1992 | Evansville | 7–2 | | | |
Evansville Purple Aces (Pioneer Football League) (1993–1997)
| 1993 | Evansville | 6–4 | 2–3 | 4th | |
| 1994 | Evansville | 4–6 | 0–5 | 6th | |
| 1995 | Evansville | 5–5 | 1–4 | T–4th | |
| 1996 | Evansville | 5–5 | 2–3 | T–3rd | |
| 1997 | Evansville | 2–8 | 0–5 | 5th | |
| Evansville: | | 34–35 | 7–23 | | |
North Park Vikings (College Conference of Illinois and Wisconsin) (2001–2005)
| 2001 | North Park | 2–8 | 0–7 | 8th | |
| 2002 | North Park | 1–9 | 0–7 | 8th | |
| 2003 | North Park | 2–8 | 0–7 | 8th | |
| 2004 | North Park | 1–9 | 0–7 | 8th | |
| 2005 | North Park | 3–7 | 0–7 | 8th | |
| North Park: | | 9–41 | 0–35 | | |
| Total: | | 51–83 | | | |
