= 1993 Valparaiso Crusaders football team =

American college football season

1993 Valparaiso Crusaders football
- Conference: Pioneer Football League
- Record: 5–5 (1–4 PFL)
- Head coach: Tom Horne (5th season)
- Home stadium: Brown Field

1993 Pioneer Football League standings
	Conf.			Overall
Team	W		L	W		L
Dayton $	5	–	0	9	–	1
Drake	3	–	2	8	–	2
Butler	3	–	2	4	–	6
Evansville	2	–	3	6	–	4
San Diego	1	–	4	6	–	4
Valparaiso	1	–	4	5	–	5
$ – Conference champion

The 1993 Valparaiso Crusaders football team represented the Valparaiso University as a member of the Pioneer Football League (PFL) during the 1993 NCAA Division I-AA football season. The team was led by fifth-year head coach Tom Horne and played their home games at the Brown Field in Valparaiso, Indiana. The Crusaders compiled an overall record of 5–5, with a mark of 1–4 in conference play, and finished tied for fifth in the PFL.

== Schedule ==
Date	Opponent	Site	Result	Attendance	Source
September 4	at St. Ambrose*	Brady Street Stadium; Davenport, IA	W 37–30		
September 11	Saint Xavier*	Brown Field; Valparaiso, IN	W 43–6		
September 18	at Millikin*	Frank M. Lindsay Field; Decatur, IL	W 36–34		
October 2	San Diego	Brown Field; Valparaiso, IN	W 35–25	5,000	
October 9	at Butler	Butler Bowl; Indianapolis, IN	L 0–10		
October 16	Drake	Brown Field; Valparaiso, IN	L 12–31		
October 23	Evansville	Brown Field; Valparaiso, IN	L 28–34	3,480	
October 30	at Dayton	Welcome Stadium; Dayton, OH	L 10–38	4,285	
November 6	Michigan Tech*	Brown Field; Valparaiso, IN	W 25–20		
November 13	at Northern Arizona*	Walkup Skydome; Flagstaff, AZ	L 13–55	5,009	
*Non-conference game
