= 1995 Butler Bulldogs football team =

American college football season

1995 Butler Bulldogs football
- Conference: Pioneer Football League
- Record: 2–8 (1–4 PFL)
- Head coach: Ken LaRose (4th season)
- Home stadium: Butler Bowl

1995 Pioneer Football League standings
	Conf.					Overall
Team	W		L		T	W		L		T
Drake $	5	–	0	–	0	8	–	1	–	1
Dayton	4	–	1	–	0	9	–	2	–	0
San Diego	3	–	2	–	0	5	–	5	–	0
Evansville	1	–	4	–	0	5	–	5	–	0
Valparaiso	1	–	4	–	0	5	–	5	–	0
Butler	1	–	4	–	0	2	–	8	–	0
$ – Conference champion

The 1995 Butler Bulldogs football team represented Butler University as a member of the Pioneer Football League (PFL) during the 1995 NCAA Division I-AA football season. The team was led by fourth-year head coach Ken LaRose and played their home games at the Butler Bowl in Indianapolis. The Bulldogs compiled an overall record of 2–8, with a mark of 1–4 in conference play, and finished tied for fourth in the PFL.

== Schedule ==
Date	Time	Opponent	Site	Result	Attendance	Source
September 2		Howard Payne*	Butler Bowl; Indianapolis, IN	W 17–7	3,890	
September 9		at Towson State*	Minnegan Stadium; Towson, MD	L 3–34	1,437	
September 16		at Millikin*	Frank M. Lindsay Field; Decatur, IL	L 15–27		
September 23		Wisconsin–Stevens Point*	Butler Bowl; Indianapolis, IN	L 0–37		
September 30	2:00 p.m.	Drake	Butler Bowl; Indianapolis, IN	L 8–29	4,912	
October 7		Valparaiso	Butler Bowl; Indianapolis, IN	L 42–44		
October 14		at Dayton	Welcome Stadium; Dayton, OH	L 13–49		
October 21		Thomas More*	Butler Bowl; Indianapolis, IN	L 29–37	1,351	
October 28		at Evansville	Arad McCutchan Stadium; Evansville, IN	W 14–13		
November 4		at San Diego	Torero Stadium; San Diego, CA	L 16–37		
*Non-conference game; All times are in Eastern time
