= Tom Horne (American football) =

American football coach

Playing career
- 1972–1976: Wisconsin–La Crosse

Coaching career (HC unless noted)
- 1981: Salem (OC)
- 1982–1984: Iowa Wesleyan
- 1986–1988: Joliet
- 1989–2004: Valparaiso

Head coaching record
- Overall: 84–114–2 (college)

Accomplishments and honors

Championships
- 2 PFL (2000, 2003)

Tom Horne Jr. is an American former college football coach. He was the head football coach at the Valparaiso University in Valparaiso, Indiana, serving for 16 seasons, from 1989 to 2004, compiling a record of 67–101–1.

== Head coaching record ==
=== College ===
Year	Team	Overall	Conference	Standing	Bowl/playoffs
Iowa Wesleyan Tigers (NAIA Division II independent) (1982–1984)
1982	Iowa Wesleyan	2–8			
1983	Iowa Wesleyan	7–2–1			
1984	Iowa Wesleyan	8–3			
Valparaiso:		17–13–1			
Valparaiso Crusaders (Heartland Collegiate Conference) (1989)
1989	Valparaiso	0–10	0–4	5th	
Valparaiso Crusaders (Midwest Intercollegiate Football Conference) (1990–1992)
1990	Valparaiso	1–9	1–9	10th	
1991	Valparaiso	1–8–1	1–8–1	10th	
1992	Valparaiso	3–8	3–7	T–7th	
Valparaiso Crusaders (Pioneer Football League) (1993–2004)
1993	Valparaiso	5–5	1–4	T–5th	
1994	Valparaiso	7–3	2–3	T–4th	
1995	Valparaiso	5–5	1–4	T–4th	
1996	Valparaiso	4–6	1–4	T–5th	
1997	Valparaiso	3–7	2–3	T–3rd	
1998	Valparaiso	5–6	2–2	3rd	
1999	Valparaiso	9–2	3–1	2nd	
2000	Valparaiso	7–4	3–1	T–1st	
2001	Valparaiso	3–8	1–3	T–4th (North)	
2002	Valparaiso	1–10	0–4	5th (North)	
2003	Valparaiso	8–4	3–1	T–1st (North)	
2004	Valparaiso	5–6	1–3	4th (North)	
Valparaiso:		67–101–1	25–57–1		
Total:		84–114–2			
