= 1994 Drake Bulldogs football team =

American college football season

1994 Drake Bulldogs football
- Conference: Pioneer Football League
- Record: 7–3 (3–2 PFL)
- Head coach: Rob Ash (6th season)
- Offensive coordinator: Joe Hadachek (5th season)
- Home stadium: Drake Stadium

1994 Pioneer Football League standings
	Conf.			Overall
Team	W		L	W		L
Dayton +	4	–	1	8	–	2
Butler +	4	–	1	7	–	3
Drake	3	–	2	7	–	3
Valparaiso	2	–	3	7	–	3
San Diego	2	–	3	6	–	4
Evansville	0	–	5	4	–	6
+ – Conference co-champions

The 1994 Drake Bulldogs football team represented Drake University as a member of the Pioneer Football League (PFL) during the 1994 NCAA Division I-AA football season. The team was led by sixth-year head coach Rob Ash and played their home games at Drake Stadium in Des Moines, Iowa. The Bulldogs compiled an overall record of 7–3, with a mark of 3–2 in conference play, and finished third in the PFL.

== Schedule ==
Date	Opponent	Site	Result	Source
September 10	at Simpson*	Simpson–Indianola Community Field; Indianola, IA	W 22–6	
September 17	San Diego	Drake Stadium; Des Moines, IA	W 14–9	
September 24	at Aurora*	Spartan Athletic Park; Montgomery, IL	W 26–0	
October 1	Butler	Drake Stadium; Des Moines, IA	L 20–28	
October 8	at Evansville	Arad McCutchan Stadium; Evansville, IN	W 31–21	
October 15	Valparaiso	Drake Stadium; Des Moines, IA	W 23–3	
October 22	at Dayton	Welcome Stadium; Dayton, OH	L 7–24	
October 29	at Nebraska–Kearney*	Foster Field; Kearney, NE	L 14–17	
November 5	Wisconsin–Oshkosh*	Drake Stadium; Des Moines, IA	W 41–7	
November 12	St. Ambrose*	Drake Stadium; Des Moines, IA	W 19–0	
*Non-conference game
