= 1993 Drake Bulldogs football team =

American college football season

1993 Drake Bulldogs football
- Conference: Pioneer Football League
- Record: 8–2 (3–2 PFL)
- Head coach: Rob Ash (5th season)
- Offensive coordinator: Joe Hadachek (4th season)
- Home stadium: Drake Stadium

1993 Pioneer Football League standings
	Conf.			Overall
Team	W		L	W		L
Dayton $	5	–	0	9	–	1
Drake	3	–	2	8	–	2
Butler	3	–	2	4	–	6
Evansville	2	–	3	6	–	4
San Diego	1	–	4	6	–	4
Valparaiso	1	–	4	5	–	5
$ – Conference champion

The 1993 Drake Bulldogs football team represented Drake University as a member of the Pioneer Football League (PFL) during the 1993 NCAA Division I-AA football season. The team was led by fifth-year head coach Rob Ash and played their home games at Drake Stadium in Des Moines, Iowa. The Bulldogs compiled an overall record of 8–2, with a mark of 3–2 in conference play, and finished tied for second in the PFL.

== Schedule ==
Date	Opponent	Site	Result	Attendance	Source
September 11	Simpson*	Drake Stadium; Des Moines, IA	W 35–9		
September 18	at Augustana (IL)*	Ericson Field; Rock Island, IL	W 54–48		
September 25	at Butler	Butler Bowl; Indianapolis, IN	L 3–28	1,205	
October 2	Aurora*	Drake Stadium; Des Moines, IA	W 47–14		
October 9	at Chicago*	Stagg Field; Chicago, IL	W 33–19		
October 16	at Valparaiso	Brown Field; Valparaiso, IN	W 31–12		
October 23	Dayton	Drake Stadium; Des Moines, IA	L 7–35	6,450	
October 30	Benedictine (IL)*	Drake Stadium; Des Moines, IA	W 48–33	1,390	
November 6	at San Diego	Torero Stadium; San Diego, CA	W 17–14		
November 13	Evansville	Drake Stadium; Des Moines, IA	W 29–27		
*Non-conference game
