= Safety (gridiron football score) =

Scoring play in gridiron football

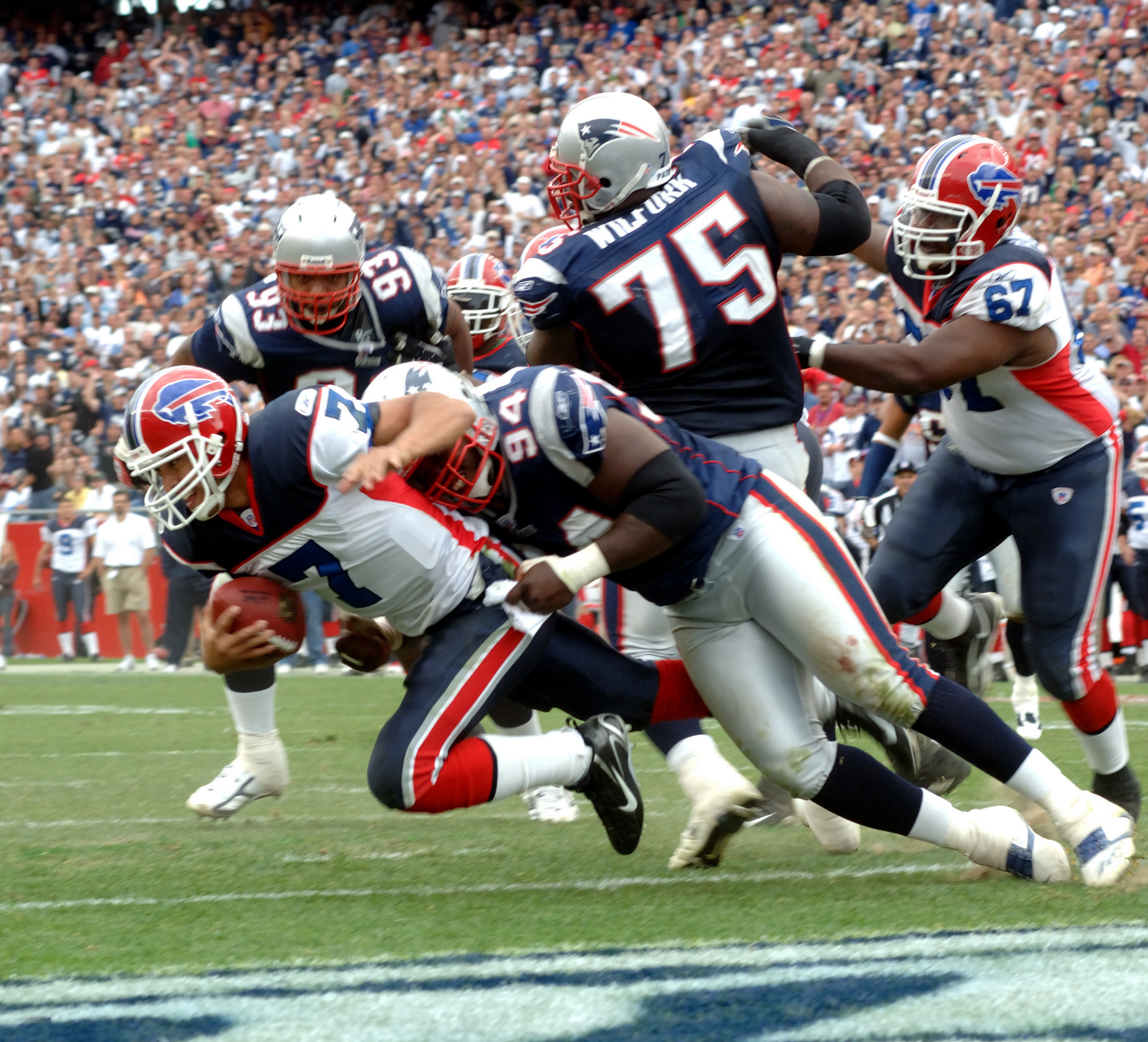
Buffalo Bills quarterback J. P. Losman is tackled by New England Patriots defensive lineman Ty Warren. Because Losman was tackled behind his own goal line, this play resulted in a safety for New England.

In gridiron football, a safety (American football) or safety touch (Canadian football) is a scoring play that results in two points being awarded to the scoring team. Safeties can be scored in a number of ways, such as when a ball carrier is tackled in his own end zone or when a foul is committed by the offense in its own end zone. After a safety is scored in American football, the ball is kicked off to the team that scored the safety from the 20-yard line; in Canadian football, the scoring team also has the options of taking control of the ball at its own 35-yard line or kicking off the ball, also at its own 35-yard line. The ability of the scoring team to receive the ball through a kickoff differs from the touchdown and field goal, which require the scoring team to kick the ball off to the scored-upon team. Despite being of relatively low point value, safeties can have a significant impact on the result of games, and Brian Burke of Advanced NFL Stats estimated that safeties have a greater abstract value than field goals, despite being worth a point less, due to the field position and reclaimed possession gained off the safety kick.

Safeties are the least common method of scoring in American football, but are not necessarily rare occurrences. As of the conclusion of the 2025 season, 78,699 touchdowns and 41,933 field goals have been scored in regular season games in NFL history. Comparatively, 1,139 safeties have been scored in regular season games through 2025.

A much rarer occurrence is the one-point (or conversion) safety, which can be scored by the offense on an extra point or two-point conversion attempt: these have occurred at least twice in NCAA Division I football since 1996, most recently at the 2013 Fiesta Bowl, though no conversion safeties have occurred since 1940 in the NFL. A conversion safety by the defense is also possible, though highly unlikely. Although this has never occurred, it is the only possible way a team could finish with a single point in an American football game. (Note: At some levels of play, a forfeit is recorded as a 1–0 result.)

== Scoring a safety ==
=== American football ===
In American football, a safety is scored when any of the following conditions occur:

- The ball carrier is tackled or forced out of bounds in his own end zone.
- The ball becomes dead in the end zone, with the exception of an incomplete forward pass, and the defending team is responsible for it being there.
- The offense commits a foul in its own end zone.

=== Canadian football ===
In Canadian football, a safety touch is scored when any of the following conditions occur:

- The ball becomes dead in the goal area of the team in possession of the ball
- The ball touches or crosses the dead line or a sideline in goal after having been directed from the field of play into the Goal Area by the team scored against or as the direct result of a blocked scrimmage kick.
- The ball carrier is penalized for intentional grounding or an offside pass in his own goal area.

== Resuming play after a safety ==
=== American football ===
After a safety is scored, the ball is put into play by a free kick. The team that was scored upon must kick the ball from its own 20-yard line and can punt, drop kick, or place kick the ball. Prior to 2024, a tee could not be used in the NFL; a tee has always been legal in high school or college football. Once the ball has been kicked, it can be caught and advanced by any member of the receiving team, and it can be recovered by the kicking team if the ball travels at least 10 yards or a player of the receiving team touches the ball.

=== Canadian football ===
After scoring a safety touch, the scoring team has the option of taking control of the ball and beginning play from its own 35-yard line, kicking the ball off from its 35-yard line, or accepting a kickoff from the team that conceded the score. When the scored-against team kicks off, it comes from the 35-yard line under amateur rules and from the 25-yard line under CFL rules. If a kickoff is chosen it must be a place kick, and the ball can be held, placed on the ground, or placed on a tee prior to the kick. As in American football, the ball must go at least ten yards before it can be recovered by the kicking team.

== Elective safeties ==
In American football, intentionally conceded safeties are an uncommon strategy. Teams have utilized elective safeties to gain better field position for a punt when pinned deep in their own territory, prevent opposing teams from scoring or gaining heavily advantageous field position following a poor shotgun snap or botched punt, and, when ahead near the end of a game, to run down the clock so as to deny the other team a chance to force a turnover or return a punt. Teams have also taken intentional safeties by kicking a loose ball out the back of their end zone (which is an illegal kick), with the intent of preventing the defense from scoring a touchdown.

In the NFL, starting with the 2023 season, a defense can decline a safety in favor of accepting a penalty committed in the end zone by the offense. An example where a defense may choose to do this could be an illegal kick committed in the end zone by the offense (such as may occur following a bad snap on an attempted punt) on fourth down; rather than allowing the play to result in a safety, the defense could accept the penalty, which for an illegal kick is 10 yards (or no more than half the distance to the goal line) from the previous spot of the ball and a loss of down. With the infraction committed on fourth down, this would result in a change of possession, with the team that was on defense now having possession of the ball close to their opponent's goal line.

Elective safeties are more common in Canadian football, where they can result in better outcomes than a punt; the Canadian rulebook has no provision for a fair catch, which combined with the requirement that returners are afforded a five-yard buffer zone when fielding any kick means that punts from deep in one team's own end have a much higher probability of being run back for either a touchdown or excellent starting field position. The 2010 Edmonton Eskimos surrendered a Canadian Football League (CFL)-record 14 safeties, a factor that led CFL reporter Jim Mullin to suggest increasing the value of the safety touch from two to three points as a deterrent.

== Conversion safeties (one-point safeties) ==
=== Scored by the offense ===
In American football, if a team attempting an extra point or two-point conversion (officially known in the rulebooks as a try) scores what would normally be a safety, that attempting team is awarded one point. This is commonly known as a conversion safety or one-point safety. The first known occurrence of the conversion safety was in an NCAA University Division (now NCAA FBS) game on October 2, 1971, scored by Syracuse in a game at Indiana. On a failed extra point attempt, an Indiana player illegally batted the ball in the end zone (a spot foul defensive penalty). There are two other known occurrences of the conversion safety in Division I FBS college football – a November 26, 2004, game in which Texas scored against Texas A&M, and the 2013 Fiesta Bowl in which Oregon scored against Kansas State. In both games, the extra point attempt was blocked and recovered in the field of play by the defense, which then fumbled or took the ball back into its own end zone where a player was tackled. A conversion safety has occurred once in Division I-AA (now NCAA FCS) where Nevada scored a conversion safety against North Texas on September 21, 1991 and twice in Division II: once by Morningside College on November 9, 1996, against Northern Colorado, and once by Emory and Henry College on October 8, 2022, against University of Virginia's College at Wise. There are also at least four known NCAA Division III occurrences, the first being on October 20, 1990, scored by DePauw University against Anderson University; the second on October 23, 1993, scored by Salisbury State against Wesley College; the third on November 11, 2000, scored by Hamline University against St. Thomas-Minnesota, and the most recent scored by Bluffton University against Franklin College (Indiana) on November 9, 2013. One-point safeties have also occurred in an NAIA game and two junior college games.

No conversion safeties have been scored in the NFL since 1940, although it is now slightly more likely after a rule change in 2015 allowed the defense to take possession and score on a conversion attempt which, like college football, awards the defense two points for returning a blocked PAT attempt, or intercepting, or returning a fumble on a 2-point conversion.

Before 2015, the only scenario in which a one-point safety could have been scored in the NFL would have involved, on a conversion attempt in which the ball was not kicked by the offense, the defense then kicking or batting a loose ball out of its own end zone without taking possession of the ball, giving the offense a one-point safety.

=== Scored by the defense ===
A conversion safety can also be scored by the defense. This scoring play has never occurred; to accomplish this, the team attempting the try must somehow be forced back to its own end zone. A possible scenario in the NFL and NCAA would involve a turnover while attempting a conversion, followed by the defending team's ball-carrier fumbling while en route to the attempting team's end zone, with the attempting team then recovering the ball and, after establishing possession outside the end zone, downing it in its own end zone (this scenario is not possible in high school football, as a turnover ends the conversion attempt; such a conversion safety could occur only if the offense maintains possession). While such a conversion safety has never been scored by the defense, it is the only possible way under current rules in which a team could finish with a single point in an American football game.

== See also ==
- List of safety records
- Touchback
- Own goal
- Scorigami
