= 1993 Evansville Purple Aces football team =

American college football season

1993 Evansville Purple Aces football
- Conference: Pioneer Football League
- Record: 6–4 (2–3 PFL)
- Head coach: Robin Cooper (3rd season)
- Home stadium: Arad McCutchan Stadium

1993 Pioneer Football League standings
	Conf.			Overall
Team	W		L	W		L
Dayton $	5	–	0	9	–	1
Drake	3	–	2	8	–	2
Butler	3	–	2	4	–	6
Evansville	2	–	3	6	–	4
San Diego	1	–	4	6	–	4
Valparaiso	1	–	4	5	–	5
$ – Conference champion

The 1993 Evansville Purple Aces football team represented the University of Evansville as a member of the Pioneer Football League (PFL) during the 1993 NCAA Division I-AA football season. The team was led by third-year head coach Robin Cooper and played their home games at the Arad McCutchan Stadium in Evansville, Indiana. The Purple Aces compiled an overall record of 6–4, with a mark of 2–3 in conference play, and finished fourth in the PFL.

== Schedule ==
Date	Opponent	Site	Result	Attendance	Source
September 11	at Franklin (IN)*	Goodell Field; Franklin, IN	W 29–14	1,732	
September 18	Kentucky Wesleyan*	Arad McCutchan Stadium; Evansville, IN	W 35–14	1,421	
September 25	Rose–Hulman*	Arad McCutchan Stadium; Evansville, IN	W 38–8	1,322	
October 2	at Adrian*	Maple High School Stadium; Adrian, MI	L 15–22	1,235	
October 9	Dayton	Arad McCutchan Stadium; Evansville, IN	L 6–13	1,865	
October 16	San Diego	Arad McCutchan Stadium; Evansville, IN	W 27–21	779	
October 23	at Valparaiso	Brown Field; Valparaiso, IN	W 34–28	3,480	
October 30	Butler	Arad McCutchan Stadium; Evansville, IN	L 12–14	879	
November 6	Cumberland (TN)*	Arad McCutchan Stadium; Evansville, IN	W 28–12	624	
November 13	at Drake	Drake Stadium; Des Moines, IA	L 27–29		
*Non-conference game
