= 1994 Valparaiso Crusaders football team =

American college football season

1994 Valparaiso Crusaders football
- Conference: Pioneer Football League
- Record: 7–3 (2–3 PFL)
- Head coach: Tom Horne (6th season)
- Home stadium: Brown Field

1994 Pioneer Football League standings
	Conf.			Overall
Team	W		L	W		L
Dayton +	4	–	1	8	–	2
Butler +	4	–	1	7	–	3
Drake	3	–	2	7	–	3
Valparaiso	2	–	3	7	–	3
San Diego	2	–	3	6	–	4
Evansville	0	–	5	4	–	6
+ – Conference co-champions

The 1994 Valparaiso Crusaders football team represented the Valparaiso University as a member of the Pioneer Football League (PFL) during the 1994 NCAA Division I-AA football season. The team was led by sixth-year head coach Tom Horne and played their home games at the Brown Field in Valparaiso, Indiana. The Crusaders compiled an overall record of 7–3, with a mark of 2–3 in conference play, and finished tied for fourth in the PFL.

== Schedule ==
Date	Opponent	Site	Result	Attendance	Source
September 3	St. Ambrose*	Brown Field; Valparaiso, IN	W 34–12		
September 17	Millikin*	Brown Field; Valparaiso, IN	W 9–6		
September 24	Kalamazoo*	Brown Field; Valparaiso, IN	W 45–10		
October 1	at San Diego	Torero Stadium; San Diego, CA	L 27–33	4,000	
October 8	Butler	Brown Field; Valparaiso, IN	W 20–14		
October 15	at Drake	Drake Stadium; Des Moines, IA	L 3–23		
October 22	at Evansville	Arad McCutchan Stadium; Evansville, IN	W 34–21		
October 29	Dayton	Brown Field; Valparaiso, IN	L 13–30		
November 5	Aurora*	Brown Field; Valparaiso, IN	W 28–10		
November 12	at Kentucky Wesleyan*	Apollo Stadium; Owensboro, KY	W 30–23	200	
*Non-conference game
