= 1993 Dayton Flyers football team =

American college football season

1993 Dayton Flyers football

PFL champion
- Conference: Pioneer Football League
- Record: 9–1 (5–0 PFL)
- Head coach: Mike Kelly (13th season)
- Home stadium: Welcome Stadium

1993 Pioneer Football League standings
	Conf.			Overall
Team	W		L	W		L
Dayton $	5	–	0	9	–	1
Drake	3	–	2	8	–	2
Butler	3	–	2	4	–	6
Evansville	2	–	3	6	–	4
San Diego	1	–	4	6	–	4
Valparaiso	1	–	4	5	–	5
$ – Conference champion

The 1993 Dayton Flyers football team represented the University of Dayton as a member of the Pioneer Football League (PFL) during the 1993 NCAA Division I-AA football season. The team was led by 13th-year head coach Mike Kelly and played their home games at Welcome Stadium in Dayton, Ohio. The Flyers compiled an overall record of 9–1, with a mark of 5–0 in conference play, and finished as PFL champion.

== Schedule ==
Date	Opponent	Site	Result	Attendance	Source
September 11	Wisconsin–Platteville*	Welcome Stadium; Dayton, OH	W 31–14	6,208	
September 18	Wheaton (IL)*	Welcome Stadium; Dayton, OH	W 31–8	6,387	
September 25	San Diego	Welcome Stadium; Dayton, OH	W 30–7	5,221	
October 2	at Mount St. Joseph*	Oak Hills H.S. Stadium; Bridgetown, OH	W 24–23		
October 9	at Evansville	Arad McCutchan Stadium; Evansville, IN	W 13–6	1,865	
October 16	Butler	Welcome Stadium; Dayton, OH	W 28–6	5,347	
October 23	at Drake	Drake Stadium; Des Moines, IA	W 35–7	6,450	
October 30	Valparaiso	Welcome Stadium; Dayton, OH	W 38–10	4,285	
November 6	Urbana*	Welcome Stadium; Dayton, OH	W 49–6	3,662	
November 13	at UAB*	Legion Field; Birmingham, AL	L 19–27	7,428	
*Non-conference game
