= 1993 Butler Bulldogs football team =

American college football season

1993 Butler Bulldogs football
- Conference: Pioneer Football League
- Record: 4–6 (3–2 PFL)
- Head coach: Ken LaRose (2nd season)
- Home stadium: Butler Bowl

1993 Pioneer Football League standings
	Conf.			Overall
Team	W		L	W		L
Dayton $	5	–	0	9	–	1
Drake	3	–	2	8	–	2
Butler	3	–	2	4	–	6
Evansville	2	–	3	6	–	4
San Diego	1	–	4	6	–	4
Valparaiso	1	–	4	5	–	5
$ – Conference champion

The 1993 Butler Bulldogs football team represented Butler University as a member of the Pioneer Football League (PFL) during the 1993 NCAA Division I-AA football season. The team was led by second-year head coach Ken LaRose and played their home games at the Butler Bowl in Indianapolis. The Bulldogs compiled an overall record of 4–6, with a mark of 3–2 in conference play, and finished tied for second in the PFL.

== Schedule ==
Date	Opponent	Site	Result	Attendance	Source
September 4	at Hofstra*	Hofstra Stadium; Hempstead, NY	L 19–20		
September 18	at Georgetown (KY)*	Hinton Field; Georgetown, KY	W 24–21		
September 25	Drake	Butler Bowl; Indianapolis, IN	W 28–3	1,205	
October 2	Hillsdale*	Butler Bowl; Indianapolis, IN	L 7–29	5,310	
October 9	Valparaiso	Butler Bowl; Indianapolis, IN	W 10–0		
October 16	at Dayton	Welcome Stadium; Dayton, OH	L 6–28	5,347	
October 23	at San Diego	Torero Stadium; San Diego, CA	L 27–28		
October 30	at Evansville	Arad McCutchan Stadium; Evansville, IN	W 14–12	879	
November 6	UAB*	Butler Bowl; Indianapolis, IN	L 27–31	1,047	
November 13	at Indianapolis*	Key Stadium; Indianapolis, IN	L 21–34	4,000	
*Non-conference game
