= Rob Ash =

American football player and coach (born 1951)

Biographical details
- Born: July 9, 1951 (age 75); Des Moines, Iowa, U.S.

Playing career
- 1970–1972: Cornell (IA)
- Position: Quarterback

Coaching career (HC unless noted)
- 1976–1979: Cornell (IA) (assistant)
- 1980–1988: Juniata
- 1989–2006: Drake
- 2007–2015: Montana State
- 2016: Arkansas (offensive analyst)

Administrative career (AD unless noted)
- 1990: Drake (interim AD)

Head coaching record
- Overall: 246–137–5
- Tournaments: 2–4 (NCAA D-I playoffs)

Accomplishments and honors

Championships
- 4 PFL (1995, 1998, 2000, 2004); 3 Big Sky (2010–2012); 1 MAC Northern Division (1981)

Awards
- Liberty Mutual Coach of the Year Award (2011); 3× PFL Coach of the Year (1995, 1998, 2004)

Robert W. Ash (born July 9, 1951) is an American former college football coach. He served as the head football coach at Juniata College in Huntingdon, Pennsylvania from 1980 to 1988, Drake University in Des Moines, Iowa from 1989 to 2006, and Montana State University in Bozeman, Montana from 2007 to 2015, compiling a career college football coaching record of 246–137–5. His record was 75–51–4 at the NCAA Division III level and 171–86–1 at the NCAA Division I-AA/FCS level.

== Early life and playing career ==
Ash was born in Des Moines, Iowa. He played college football as quarterback at Cornell College of Mount Vernon, Iowa and earned Little All-America honors and First Team CoSIDA Academic All-America honors as a senior in 1972. Ash graduated Phi Beta Kappa in 1973, earning an NCAA Top Five Award and an NCAA Post-Graduate scholarship.

== Early coaching career ==
After a four-year stint as an assistant coach at his alma mater, Ash was hired in 1980 as head football coach at Juniata College, an NCAA Division III school in Huntingdon, Pennsylvania. After posting a 4–5 record in his first season in 1980, Juniata posted winning marks in six of the next eight campaigns. Ash finished with a 51–36–3 record as the Indians head coach.

== Drake ==
Ash recorded a 125–63–2 record in 18 seasons at Drake, including four Pioneer Football League (PFL) championships. He was named the PFL's Coach of the Year in 1995, 1998, and 2004. Ash ended his tenure at Drake with five consecutive winning seasons.

Ash led the Bulldogs to 7–3 and 6–4 records in his first two seasons. After posting a 4–6 mark in 1991, Ash's Drake squads stood 30–8–2 over the next four years. His 125 wins stands as the most in school history.

== Montana State ==
Ash was hired at Montana State on June 11, 2007. Ash's Bobcats went 6–5 in his first season as coach.

In 2009 Ash, was named second vice president of the American Football Coaches Association. Per AFCA tradition, Ash moved up to first vice president in 2010 and became president in 2011 before giving way to Harvard coach Tim Murphy the following year.

In 2010, Ash guided the Bobcats to a 9–2 regular season record, including a 7–1 mark in the Big Sky Conference. MSU defeated arch rival Montana 21–16 on the road to win the conference championship and an automatic berth to the FCS postseason. Ash was named the 2010 Big Sky Conference Coach of the Year.

In 2011, Ash guided the Cats to another share of the Big Sky Conference title, sharing with the University of Montana, and going to the NCAA playoffs. The Bobcats beat the University of New Hampshire by one in the second round before losing in the quarter finals to Sam Houston State. After the season, Ash was named the 2011 Liberty Mutual FCS Coach of the Year.

The 2012 season resulted in a one loss regular season for the Bobcats, and a share of the Big Sky Conference championship, their third in three seasons. Ash was named the Region 5 co-coach of the year for 2012 by the American Football Coaches Association.

Ash was fired at the end of the 2015 season.

== Arkansas ==
On June 2, 2016, Ash was hired by Arkansas to be the offensive analyst for head coach Bret Bielema. He served during the 2016 football season.

== Championship Analytics, Inc ==
Rob Ash is employed as Director of Coaching Development. CAI is a company Coach Ash used while at Montana State during the 2014 and 2015 seasons. While still coaching at Montana State University Ash started pitching coaches about CAI after the 2014 season, he officially started working for CAI in January, 2017.

== Head coaching record ==
Year	Team	Overall	Conference	Standing	Bowl/playoffs	TSN^{#}	Coaches^{°}
Juniata Indians (Middle Atlantic Conference) (1980–1988)
1980	Juniata	4–5	4–3	T–3rd (Northern)			
1981	Juniata	6–2–1	6–1	T–1st (Northern)			
1982	Juniata	6–4	4–3	T–4th (Northern)			
1983	Juniata	2–8	1–7	T–7th			
1984	Juniata	3–6–1	2–5–1	7th			
1985	Juniata	8–3	7–2	2nd			
1986	Juniata	9–2	7–2	T–2nd			
1987	Juniata	7–3	6–3	T–4th			
1988	Juniata	6–3–1	5–3	T–4th			
Juniata:		51–36–3	42–29–1				
Drake Bulldogs (NCAA Division III independent) (1989–1992)
1989	Drake	7–3					
1990	Drake	6–4					
1991	Drake	4–6					
1992	Drake	7–2–1					
Drake Bulldogs (Pioneer Football League) (1993–2006)
1993	Drake	8–2	3–2	T–2nd			
1994	Drake	7–3	3–2	3rd			
1995	Drake	8–1–1	5–0	1st			
1996	Drake	8–3	4–1	2nd			
1997	Drake	8–3	2–3	3rd			
1998	Drake	7–3	4–0	1st			
1999	Drake	7–4	2–2	3rd			
2000	Drake	7–4	3–1	T–1st			
2001	Drake	5–5	1–3	T–4th (North)			
2002	Drake	5–6	1–3	4th (North)			
2003	Drake	6–6	1–3	T–4th (North)			
2004	Drake	10–2	4–0	1st (North)			
2005	Drake	6–4	2–2	3rd (North)			
2006	Drake	9–2	6–1	2nd			
Drake:		125–63–2	41–23				
Montana State Bobcats (Big Sky Conference) (2007–2015)
2007	Montana State	6–5	4–4	T–4th			
2008	Montana State	7–5	5–3	T–3rd			
2009	Montana State	7–4	5–3	4th			
2010	Montana State	9–3	7–1	T–1st	L NCAA Division I Second Round	11	11
2011	Montana State	10–3	7–1	1st	L NCAA Division I Quarterfinal	7	7
2012	Montana State	11–2	7–1	T–1st	L NCAA Division I Quarterfinal	5	5
2013	Montana State	7–5	5–3	T–4th		20	20
2014	Montana State	8–5	6–2	T–2nd	L NCAA Division I First Round	20	20
2015	Montana State	5–6	3–5	T–8th			
Montana State:		70–38	50–23				
Total:		246–137–5					
National championship Conference title Conference division title or championship game berth
^{#}Rankings from final Coaches Poll.; ^{°}Rankings from final AP Poll.

== See also ==
- List of college football career coaching wins leaders
