= 1995 Drake Bulldogs football team =

American college football season

1995 Drake Bulldogs football

PFL champion
- Conference: Pioneer Football League
- Record: 8–1–1 (5–0 PFL)
- Head coach: Rob Ash (7th season)
- Offensive coordinator: Joe Hadachek (6th season)
- Defensive coordinator: Jay Niemann (7th season)
- Home stadium: Drake Stadium

1995 Pioneer Football League standings
	Conf.					Overall
Team	W		L		T	W		L		T
Drake $	5	–	0	–	0	8	–	1	–	1
Dayton	4	–	1	–	0	9	–	2	–	0
San Diego	3	–	2	–	0	5	–	5	–	0
Evansville	1	–	4	–	0	5	–	5	–	0
Valparaiso	1	–	4	–	0	5	–	5	–	0
Butler	1	–	4	–	0	2	–	8	–	0
$ – Conference champion

The 1995 Drake Bulldogs football team represented Drake University as a member of the Pioneer Football League (PFL) during the 1995 NCAA Division I-AA football season. Led by third-year head coach Rob Ash, the Bulldogs compiled an overall record of 8–1–1 with a mark of 5–0 in conference play, winning the PFL title. The team played its home games at Drake Stadium in Des Moines, Iowa.

== Schedule ==
Date	Time	Opponent	Site	Result	Attendance	Source
September 2	1:00 p.m.	Missouri Western*	Drake Stadium; Des Moines, IA	T 19–19	3,015	
September 9	1:00 p.m.	St. Ambrose*	Drake Stadium; Des Moines, IA	W 23–0	2,306	
September 16	1:00 p.m.	at Wisconsin–LaCrosse*	Veterans Memorial Stadium; La Crosse, WI	L 7–14	4,167	
September 23	1:00 p.m.	at Aurora*	Vago Field; Aurora, IL	W 37–7	5,850	
September 30	1:00 p.m.	at Butler	Butler Bowl; Indianapolis, IN	W 29–8	4,912	
October 7	1:00 p.m.	Evansville^{†}	Drake Stadium; Des Moines, IA	W 23–6	4,170	
October 14	1:00 p.m.	at Valparaiso	Brown Field; Valparaiso, IN	W 28–21	1,713	
October 21	1:00 p.m.	Dayton	Drake Stadium; Des Moines, IA (rivalry)	W 34–23	5,105	
October 28	1:00 p.m.	at San Diego	Torero Stadium; San Diego, CA	W 9–0	2,871	
November 11	1:00 p.m.	Northwestern (IA)*	Drake Stadium; Des Moines, IA	W 28–6	2,320	
*Non-conference game; ^{†}Homecoming; All times are in Central time
