= 2000 Drake Bulldogs football team =

American college football season

2000 Drake Bulldogs football

PFL co-champion
- Conference: Pioneer Football League
- Record: 7–4 (3–1 PFL)
- Head coach: Rob Ash (8th season)
- Home stadium: Drake Stadium

2000 Pioneer Football League standings
	Conf.			Overall
Team	W		L	W		L
Dayton +	3	–	1	8	–	3
Drake +	3	–	1	7	–	4
Valparaiso +	3	–	1	7	–	4
San Diego	1	–	3	4	–	6
Butler	0	–	4	2	–	8
+ – Conference co-champions

The 2000 Drake Bulldogs football team represented Drake University as a member of the Pioneer Football League (PFL) during the 2000 NCAA Division I-AA football season. Led by eighth-year head coach Rob Ash, the Bulldogs compiled an overall record of 7–4 with a mark of 3–1 in conference play, sharing the PFL title with Dayton and Valparaiso. The team played its home games at Drake Stadium in Des Moines, Iowa.

== Schedule ==
Date	Time	Opponent	Site	Result	Attendance	Source
September 2	1:00 p.m.	McKendree*	Drake Stadium; Des Moines, IA	W 28–11	3,721	
September 9	1:00 p.m.	St. Ambrose*	Drake Stadium; Des Moines, IA	W 33–16	3,001	
September 16	1:00 p.m.	at Wisconsin–Stevens Point*	Goerke Field; Stevens Point, WI	W 37–29	1,525	
September 30	1:00 p.m.	San Diego	Drake Stadium; Des Moines, IA	W 52–12	7,047	
October 7	12:00 p.m.	Valparaiso^{†}	Drake Stadium; Des Moines, IA	W 54–7	3,937	
October 14	1:00 p.m.	at Southern Illinois*	McAndrew Stadium; Carbondale, IL	L 23–35	6,500	
October 21	12:00 p.m.	at Dayton	Welcome Stadium; Dayton, OH (rivalry)	L 13–41	6,526	
October 28	1:00 p.m.	Butler	Drake Stadium; Des Moines, IA	W 62–41	4,287	
November 4	1:00 p.m.	Jacksonville*	Drake Stadium; Des Moines, IA	W 42–0	4,348	
November 11	3:00 p.m.	at Saint Mary's*	Saint Mary's Stadium; Moraga, CA	L 43–45	2,365	
November 18	12:00 p.m.	at Towson*	Johnny Unitas Stadium; Towson, MD	L 23–30	2,222	
*Non-conference game; ^{†}Homecoming; All times are in Central time

== Roster ==
2000 Drake Bulldogs football team roster
Players
Coaches
Offense

Pos.	#	Name	Class
QB	4	Ira Vandever	So
G	74	John Francios	Fr
OT	75	Erik Link	So

Defense

Pos.	#	Name	Class
DE	76	Thomas Rohrer	Fr

Special teams

Pos.	#	Name	Class
K	22	Billy Cundiff	Jr

Head coach

- Rob Ash

Coordinators/assistant coaches

Legend

- (C) Team captain
- (S) Suspended
- (I) Ineligible
- Injured
- Redshirt

Roster
Last update: 2000-12-04
