= 1998 Drake Bulldogs football team =

American college football season

1998 Drake Bulldogs football

PFL champion
- Conference: Pioneer Football League
- Record: 7–3 (4–0 PFL)
- Head coach: Rob Ash (10th season)
- Home stadium: Drake Stadium

1998 Pioneer Football League standings
	Conf.			Overall
Team	W		L	W		L
Drake $	4	–	0	7	–	3
Dayton	3	–	1	6	–	4
Valparaiso	2	–	2	5	–	6
Butler	1	–	3	4	–	6
San Diego	0	–	4	2	–	8
$ – Conference champion

The 1998 Drake Bulldogs football team represented Drake University as a member of the Pioneer Football League (PFL) during the 1998 NCAA Division I-AA football season. Led by sixth-year head coach Rob Ash, the Bulldogs compiled an overall record of 7–3 with a mark of 4–0 in conference play, winning the PFL title. The team played its home games at Drake Stadium in Des Moines, Iowa.

== Schedule ==
Date	Time	Opponent	Site	Result	Attendance
September 5	1:00 p.m.	Morningside*	Drake Stadium; Des Moines, IA	W 12–0	4,165
September 12	1:00 p.m.	St. Ambrose*	Drake Stadium; Des Moines, IA	L 18–24	4,166
September 19	1:00 p.m.	Wisconsin–LaCrosse*	Drake Stadium; Des Moines, IA	W 28–21	3,578
September 26	1:00 p.m.	at Quincy*	QU Stadium; Quincy, IL	W 59–34	1,100
October 3	1:00 p.m.	Valparaiso^{†}	Drake Stadium; Des Moines, IA	W 38–18	3,341
October 10	12:00 p.m.	at Dayton	Welcome Stadium; Dayton, OH (rivalry)	W 28–21	4,284
October 24	1:00 p.m.	San Diego	Drake Stadium; Des Moines, IA	W 37–13	5,415
October 31	1:00 p.m.	at Butler	Butler Bowl; Indianapolis, IN	W 41–7	4,276
November 7	3:00 p.m.	at Saint Mary's*	Saint Mary's Stadium; Moraga, CA	L 21–27	1,150
November 14	12:00 p.m.	at Towson*	Johnny Unitas Stadium; Towson, MD	L 14–17	2,145
*Non-conference game; ^{†}Homecoming; All times are in Central time
