= Drake Bulldogs football =

American college football program

2026 Drake Bulldogs football team
- First season: 1893; 133 years ago
- Head coach: Matt Walker; 1st season, 3–8 (.273)
- Location: Des Moines, Iowa
- Stadium: Drake Stadium (capacity: 14,557)
- NCAA division: Division I FCS
- Conference: Pioneer Football League
- Colors: Blue and white
- All-time record: 658–550–29 (.544)
- Bowl record: 2–3 (.400)

Conference championships
- MVC: 1928, 1929, 1930, 1931, 1933, 1972, 1981 PFL: 1995, 1998, 2000, 2004, 2011, 2012, 2023, 2024, 2025
- Rivalries: Dayton; Northern Iowa (rivalry); St. Thomas (MN)

Uniforms
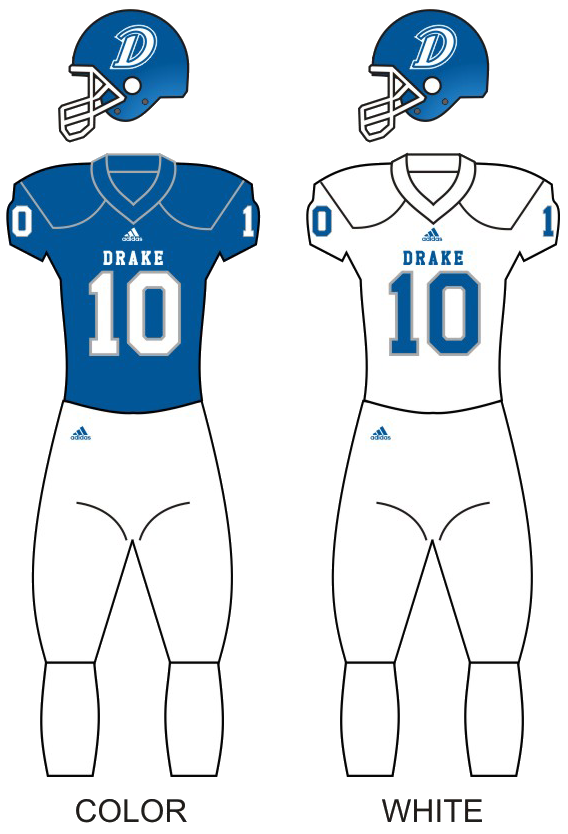
- Website: GoDrakeBulldogs.com

The Drake Bulldogs are an NCAA Division I Football Championship Subdivision non-scholarship college football program representing Drake University. They currently compete in the non-scholarship Pioneer Football League and have been charter members of the conference since 1993. Drake began playing intercollegiate football in 1893.

== History ==
=== Scholarship era ===
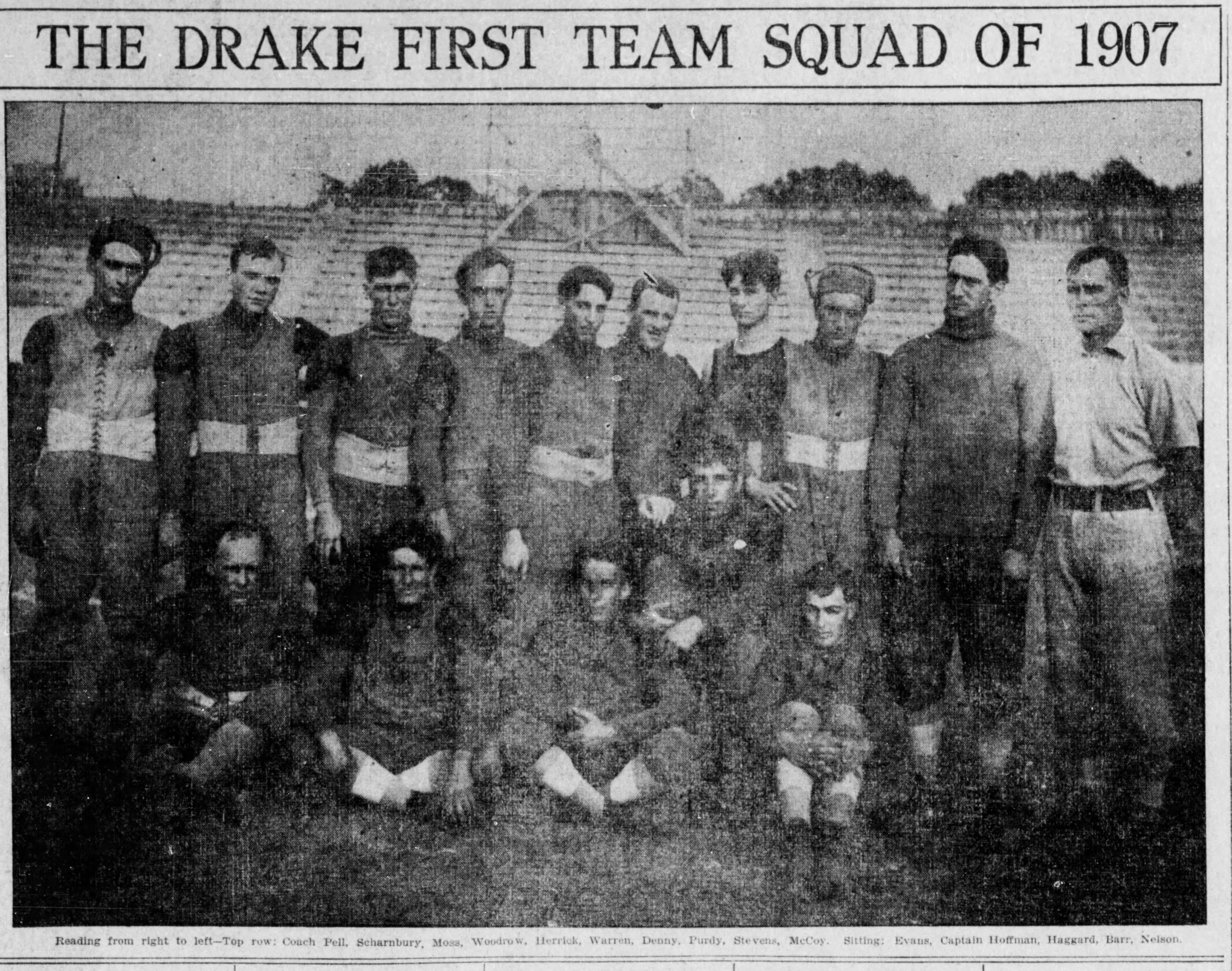
Drake football team of 1907

The 1922 Drake Bulldogs football team is considered by many to be the greatest in Drake history and is, to date, the only undefeated Bulldog team. Drake capped the historic season with a 48–6 triumph over Mississippi State on November 25, 1922. They received votes as the number one team in the College Football Researchers Association poll and were invited to the White House for their accomplishments. The Bulldogs were coached by legend Ossie Solem.

During the 1926 Homecoming activities, Babe Ruth visited and suited up for a Drake scrimmage. Head coach Ossie Solem extended the invitation stating "We finally inquired had he ever indulged in the 'dirt eating' pastime known as football. The answer was sort of a woeful 'No.' It was evident that the 'Big Bimbo' had missed something in his boyhood days, and when the invitation to work out with the Bulldogs was extended, it was accepted with glee." Ruth scored a 20-yard touchdown in the mock scrimmage.

Following the 1931 season head coach Ossie Solem scheduled a game in Honolulu, Hawaii in which the bulldogs squared off against Hawaii. Solem, who was frustrated by the lack of postseason rewards (the Rose Bowl on January 1, 1932, was the only NCAA Bowl Game following 1931 season), called the trip a reward for his team's fourth straight Missouri Valley Conference championship.

In a close encounter at Honolulu Stadium on December 19, 1931, Hawaii defeated Drake 19–13 in a game dubbed the Aloha Classic. The game was the first by an Iowa school in the state of Hawaii. It was also the last game for Solem as Bulldog coach. He left the next season taking the head football coach vacancy at Iowa.

Drake was the first school of its size to install lights. On October 6, 1928, the Bulldogs defeated Simpson College 41–6 in the first night game at Drake Stadium.

In 1951, Johnny Bright was named a First Team College Football All-American, and was awarded the Nils V. "Swede" Nelson Sportsmanship Award. He was invited to the Heisman Trophy festivities and finished fifth in the voting.

In 1969, Bright was named Drake University's greatest football player of all time. Bright is the only Drake football player to have his jersey number (#43) retired by the school, and in June 2006, received honorable mention from ESPN.com senior writer Ivan Maisel as one of the best college football players to ever wear #43. In February 2006, the football field at Drake Stadium, in Des Moines, Iowa, was named in his honor. In November 2006, Bright was voted one of the CFL's Top 50 players (#19) of the league's modern era by Canadian sports network TSN.

In 1972, the Bulldogs returned to their first bowl appearance in 3 years. They captured a share of the Missouri Valley Conference Championship, after being away from the league for 20 years, with a 4–1 record in conference play. The only conference loss was to 18th AP Ranked Louisville (Led by Tom Jackson, All-Pro Linebacker, Denver Broncos, and former ESPN Analyst). They went on to play Tennessee State and Ed 'Too Tall' Jones (All-Pro Defensive End, Dallas Cowboys) in the Pioneer Bowl, which proved to be a difficult challenge in a 29–7 loss, finishing with a 7–5 record overall. During this return to bowl competition, coach Jim Johnson was the defensive coordinator and Jack Wallace was the head coach. In 1999, Jim Johnson became the Defensive Coordinator for the Philadelphia Eagles under head coach Andy Reid.

The most successful Drake team in the modern era of college football was the 1981 Bulldogs team. Drake finished the season with 10 wins and nearly had an undefeated season. The Bulldogs lost 59–6 to Tulsa ending their chance at a perfect season. With a 7–4–0 record, Tulsa clinched the lone Missouri Valley Conference postseason berth due to the head-to-head tie-breaker. Both teams finished conference play 7–1–0.

=== Modern era ===
Following the historic 1981 season, the Bulldogs suffered five straight non-winning seasons. In 1986, the school chose not to award athletic scholarships ("grants-in-aid") to football players. It was unclear if Drake football would survive until Des Moines, Iowa native Rob Ash was introduced as coach in 1989.

Ash rejuvenated the program during his eighteen seasons at Drake and played a crucial role in the founding of the Pioneer Football League, a football-only league run out of the Missouri Valley Conference offices in St. Louis, Missouri. In the process, he became Drake's all-time winningest coach with a record of 125–63–2; leading the Bulldogs to four conference titles and five runners-up finishes in the Sports Network Cup. As a result, Ash was named the conference coach of the year three times (1995, 1998, and 2004).

After the 2006 season, Ash accepted the head football coach position at Montana State. In his final Drake season, he led the team to a runner-up finish in both the Pioneer Football League and the Sports Network Cup. Ironically, San Diego defeated Drake in both, marking the first time two Pioneer Football League teams finished first and second in the Sports Network Cup.

The Bulldogs were coached by long-time NFL assistant Steve Loney in 2007. The team finished 6–5, with a highlight 27–24 victory over #7 Illinois State on August 30. Loney resigned at the end of the season to accept a position as offensive line coach with the St. Louis Rams.

Chris Creighton was named head coach beginning with the 2008 season. In 2009, the Bulldogs missed out on a share of the conference title when Butler connected on a field goal with one second remaining in the regular season finale. In 2011, Drake shared the conference title with San Diego, their first title under Creighton. They would share the title again in 2012.

Rick Fox was named the head coach in December 2013, and coached his first game in the 2014 season. Fox coached his most successful season in 2017, when the Bulldogs finished 2nd in the PFL with a conference record of 6–2.

After the resignation of Fox, Todd Stepsis was promoted from Defensive Coordinator to become the new head coach. During his early tenure, Drake had limited success on the field, including a 14-game losing streak during the 2021 and 2022 seasons. However, Drake would turn things around late in 2022. After ending on a three-game winning streak, the Bulldogs would go undefeated in PFL play in 2023 to win the program's first undisputed conference title since 2004 and first-ever playoff bid.

In the 2024 season, the Bulldogs went 7-1 in the Pioneer League, earning a second consecutive outright conference championship and playoff bid. The Bulldogs also defeated Eastern Washington 35-32 in an overtime thriller to snap an 8-game nonconference losing streak and earn the program's first win over a scholarship team since defeating Illinois State in 2007.

Following the conclusion of the 2024 season, head coach Todd Stepsis left Drake to become head coach of the University of Northern Iowa Panthers, replacing long-time head coach Mark Farley. Stepsis was succeeded as head coach by Joe Woodley, who took the position after leading the Grand View Vikings to an undefeated season and an NAIA Championship.

== Pioneer Football League series records ==
Opponent	Record	Percentage	First year	Last year
Butler	29–8–1	.776	1932	2025
Davidson	9–3	.750	2005	2025
Dayton	10–29	.256	1952	2025
Marist	10–2	.833	2009	2025
Morehead State	10–4	.714	2003	2025
Presbyterian	2–1	.667	2020	2024
San Diego	13–20	.394	1993	2025
St. Thomas	2–3	.400	2021	2025
Stetson	6–1	.833	2014	2024
Valparaiso	29–5	.853	1993	2025

== Championships ==
Year	Conference	Overall Record	Conference Record
1928	Missouri Valley	7–1–0	3–0–0
1929	Missouri Valley	5–3–1	3–0–1
1930†	Missouri Valley	5–4–0	3–0–0
1931	Missouri Valley	5–6–0	3–0–0
1933†	Missouri Valley	6–3–1	4–1–0
1972†	Missouri Valley	7–5–0	4–1–0
1981†	Missouri Valley	10–1–0	5–1–0
1995	Pioneer Football League	8–1–1	5–0–0
1998	Pioneer Football League	7–3	4–0
2000†	Pioneer Football League	7–4	3–1
2004	Pioneer Football League	10–2	4–0
2011†	Pioneer Football League	9–2	7–1
2012†	Pioneer Football League	8–3	7–1
2023	Pioneer Football League	8–3	8–0
2024	Pioneer Football League	8–3	7–1
2025	Pioneer Football League	8–4	7–1
Total conference championships		16	
† Denotes co-champions

== Postseason ==
=== Bowl games ===
Season	Date	Bowl	Opponent	Result	Site
1946	January 1	Raisin Bowl	Fresno State	W 13–12	Fresno, California
1948	January 1	Salad Bowl	Arizona	W 14–13	Phoenix, Arizona
1957	January 1	Sun Bowl	Louisville	L 20–34	El Paso, Texas
1969	December 13	Pecan Bowl	Arkansas State	L 21–29	Arlington, Texas
1972	December 10	Pioneer Bowl	Tennessee State	L 7–29	Wichita Falls, Texas

=== NCAA Division I-AA/FCS ===
The Bulldogs have made three appearances in the Division I-AA/FCS playoffs, with an overall record of 0–3.

Year	Round	Opponent	Result
2023	First Round	North Dakota State	L, 3–66
2024	First Round	Tarleton State	L, 29–43
2025	First Round	South Dakota	L, 17–38

== Notable games ==
=== 1930 Soldier Field night game ===
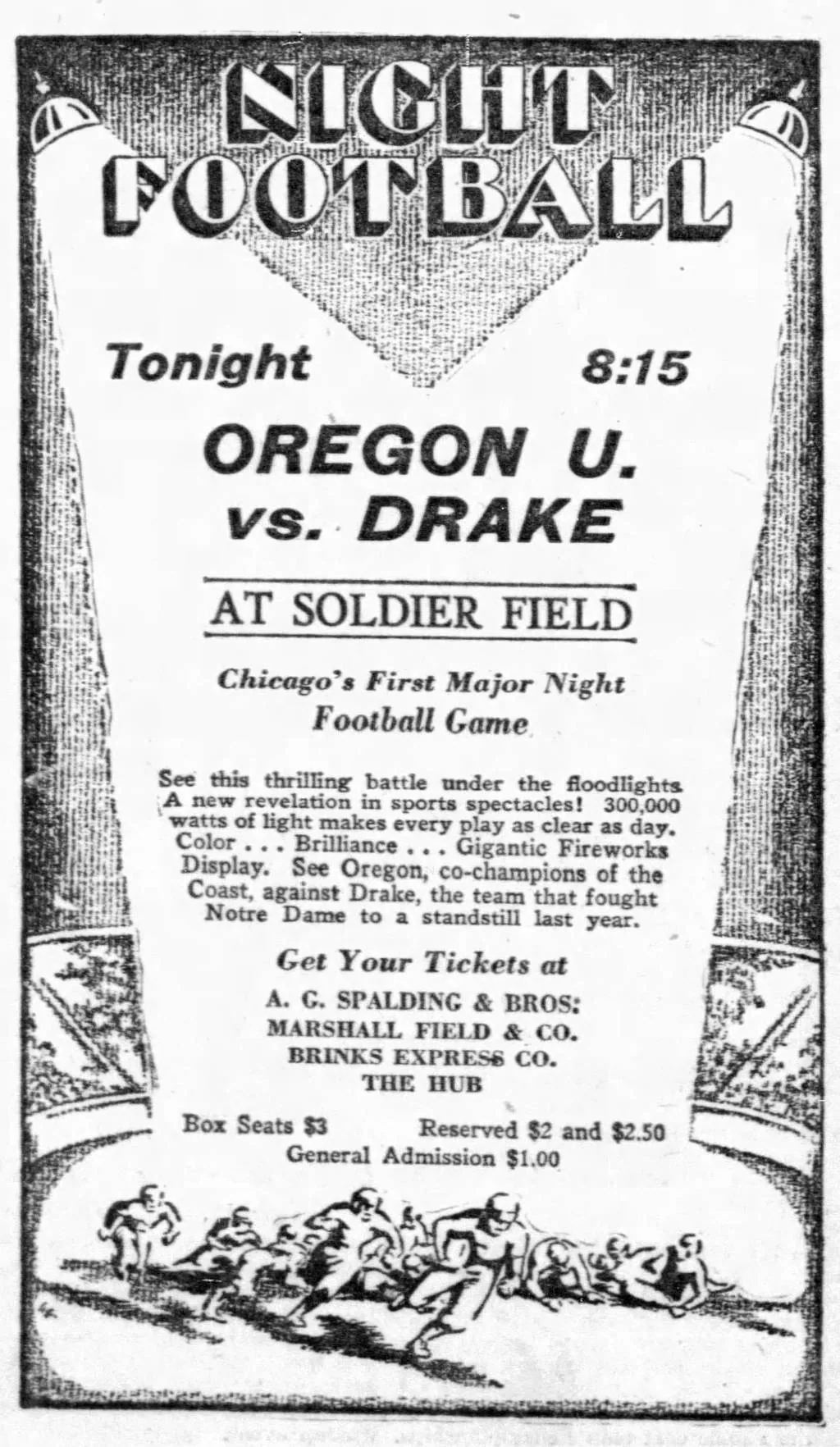
Advertisement for the 1930 Soldier Field night game

Drake played the first night game at Soldier Field, losing a close contest to Oregon 14–7 on October 3, 1930. This was the first intersectional night game ever played in Chicago, Illinois. The Drake vs. Oregon game was followed by Loyola vs. Georgetown.

=== 1938 double-header ===
On September 23, 1938, Drake won two games in the same day. The Bulldogs defeated Central 45–0 in the afternoon game, followed by a 47–0 win over Monmouth in the evening game.

=== Johnny Bright incident ===
The Johnny Bright incident was a violent on-field assault against African-American player Johnny Bright by White American player Wilbanks Smith during an American college football game held on October 20, 1951, in Stillwater, Oklahoma. The game was significant in itself as it marked the first time that an African American athlete with a national profile and of critical importance to the success of his Drake University team had played against Oklahoma A&M (now Oklahoma State University) on their home field. Bright's injury also highlighted the racial tensions of the times and assumed notoriety when it was captured in what was later to become both a widely disseminated and eventually Pulitzer Prize winning photo sequence. The event later came to be known as the "Johnny Bright Incident".

=== Global Kilimanjaro Bowl ===
On September 1, 2010, Drake announced it would forgo its normal postseason tie-ins in order to participate in the Global Kilimanjaro Bowl, the first American football game in Africa. The Bulldogs solidified their spot in the game, securing a winning season with their sixth win on October 30, 2010 (a 38–17 defeat of San Diego).

Drake continued their success during the 2011 season after the victory in the Kilimanjaro Bowl. The Bulldogs shared the Pioneer Football League title. Coach Creighton and his team were honored with the NCAS Giant Steps Award for their charity work in Africa. They were also featured in a documentary by CBS Sports for their work in Africa.

=== 2018 game vs. Iowa State ===
On December 1, 2018, Drake played FBS 23rd-ranked Iowa State in a makeup game for both schools. The game did not count toward bowl eligibility for Iowa State but served as a 12th game for their seniors.

Despite being 41-point underdogs, FCS non-scholarship Drake held its own, holding a 24–20 lead in late in the third quarter before eventually falling 27–24. Nevertheless, Drake played a memorable game and almost pulled off one of the biggest upsets ever in college football.

== All-time records ==
=== Seasons ===
- See List of Drake Bulldogs football seasons

== Individual honors ==
=== Retired numbers ===
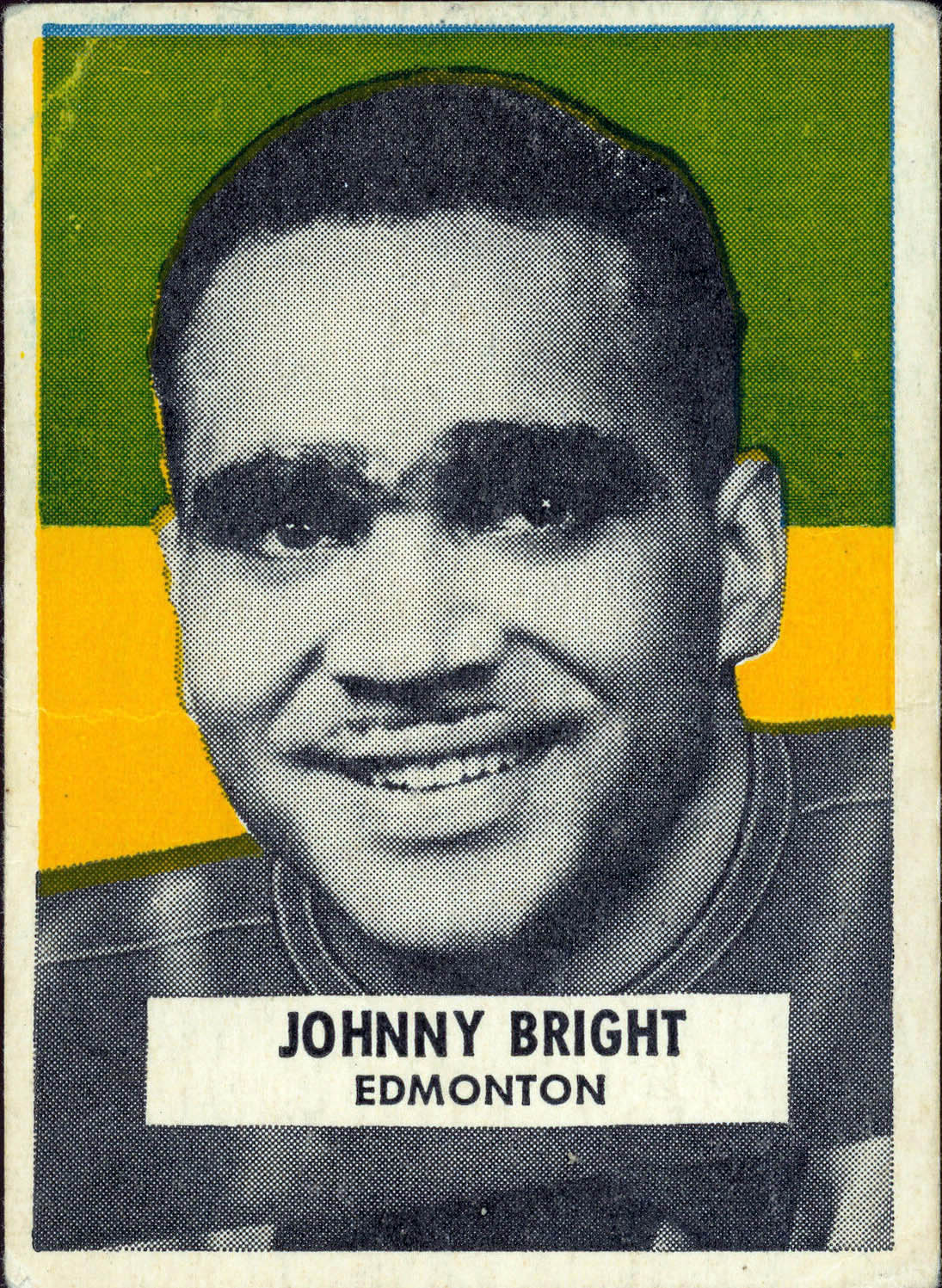
Johnny Bright, the only player to have his number retired at Drake

Drake Bulldogs retired numbers
No.	Player	Pos.	Tenure	Year retired	Ref.
43	Johnny Bright	HB/LB (Note: Bright is regarded as the greatest football player ever at Drake. In that institution, he also competed in basketball and track.)	1949–51	2006	

=== National Football Foundation College Football Hall of Famers ===
No.	Player	Induct
43	Johnny Bright	1984

== Future non-conference opponents ==
Announced schedules as of July 16, 2026.

2026	2027	2029
South Dakota Mines	at South Dakota	at South Dakota
at Montana	at Montana State	
at Northern Iowa		
