= Brian Fogarty (American football) =

American football coach

Biographical details
- Born: 1950 (age 75–76); Altadena, California, U.S.

Coaching career (HC unless noted)
- ?–1982: St. Francis HS (CA)
- 1983–1995: San Diego

Head coaching record
- Overall: 67–54–3 (college)

Brian Fogarty (born 1950) is an American former football player and coach.

Fogarty was born in 1950 in Altadena, California. He had five brothers and four sisters. He played football at St. Francis High School in La Cañada Flintridge, California. He played college football first at Pasadena City College and then at UC Santa Barbara. A head injury ended his playing career in 1970. He received a degree in physical education at Cal State Los Angeles.

After receiving his degree, he returned to Saint Francis High School as a teacher and coach. He coached the football, baseball, and basketball teams at Saint Francis.

In February 1983, he was hired as the head football coach at the University of San Diego. He held that position until 1995, compiling a record of 67–54–3 and leading the program from Division III to Division I-AA. He resigned the post in May 1996.

Fogarty remained at the University of San Diego, working in administrative and development roles until his retirement in August 2017. In 2009, the National Football Foundation presented Fogarty with the NFF Chapter Leadership Award. As a tribute to Fogarty, San Diego's first home game each year is titled the Brian Fogarty PFL Classic.
