= 1995 NCAA Division I-AA Football Championship Game =

College American football game

1995 NCAA Division I-AA Football Championship
- I-AA National Championship Game
Montana Grizzlies	Marshall Thundering Herd
(12–2)	(12–2)
Big Sky	SoCon
22	20
Head coach: Don Read	Head coach: Jim Donnan
TSN / Seed; 8 / 6	TSN / Seed; 6 / 5
	1	2	3	4	Total
Montana	3	7	2	10	22
Marshall	0	3	7	10	20
- Date: December 16, 1995
- Season: 1995
- Stadium: Marshall University Stadium
- Location: Huntington, West Virginia
- Favorite: Montana by 7
- Referee: Jim Maconaghy
- Attendance: 32,106

United States TV coverage
- Network: ESPN
- Announcers: Joel Meyers (play by play), Todd Christensen (color), and Adrian Karsten (sideline)

The 1995 NCAA Division I-AA Football Championship Game was a postseason college football game between the Marshall Thundering Herd and the Montana Grizzlies. The game was played on December 16, 1995, at Marshall University Stadium in Huntington, West Virginia. The culminating game of the 1995 NCAA Division I-AA football season, it was won by Montana, 22–20.

== Teams ==
The participants of the Championship Game were the finalists of the 1995 I-AA Playoffs, which began with a 16-team bracket. The site of the title game, Marshall University Stadium, had been determined in March 1994.

=== Montana Grizzlies ===
Montana finished their regular season with a 9–2 record (6–1 in conference). One of their wins was over Eastern New Mexico of Division II, while one of their losses was to Washington State of Division I-A. Seeded sixth in the playoffs, the Grizzlies defeated 10-seed Eastern Kentucky, 14-seed Georgia Southern, and seventh-seed Stephen F. Austin to reach the final. This was the first appearance for Montana in a Division I-AA championship game.

=== Marshall Thundering Herd ===
Marshall also finished their regular season with a 9–2 record (7–1 in conference). One of their losses was to NC State of Division I-A. The Thundering Herd, seeded fifth, defeated 12-seed Jackson State, 16-seed Northern Iowa, and top-seed McNeese State to reach the final. This was the fifth appearance for Marshall in a Division I-AA championship game, having one prior win (1992) and three prior losses (1987, 1991, and 1993).

== Game summary ==
=== Scoring summary ===
Scoring summary

Quarter	Time	Drive			Team	Scoring information	Score	
Quarter	Time	Plays	Yards	TOP	Team	Scoring information	MONT	MAR
1	6:09	6	13		MONT	48-yard field goal by Andy Larson	3	0
2	12:54	11	51		MAR	39-yard field goal by Tim Openlander	3	3
2	0:59	5	77		MONT	Matt Wells 24-yard touchdown reception from Dave Dickenson, Larson kick good	10	3
3	9:46	11	48		MAR	Chris Parker 10-yard touchdown run, Openlander kick good	10	10
3	6:54				MONT	Safety: intentional grounding in the end zone by Marshall QB Chad Pennington	12	10
4	12:30	4	20		MONT	Wells 1-yard touchdown reception from Dickenson, Larson kick good	19	10
4	10:05	7	51		MAR	21-yard field goal by Tim Openlander	19	13
4	4:45	8	76		MAR	Parker 26-yard touchdown run, Openlander kick good	19	20
4	0:39	12	72		MONT	25-yard field goal by Andy Larson	22	20
"TOP" = time of possession. For other American football terms, see Glossary of American football.							22	20

=== Game statistics ===
	1	2	3	4	Total
No. 6 Grizzlies	3	7	2	10	22
No. 5 Thundering Herd	0	3	7	10	20

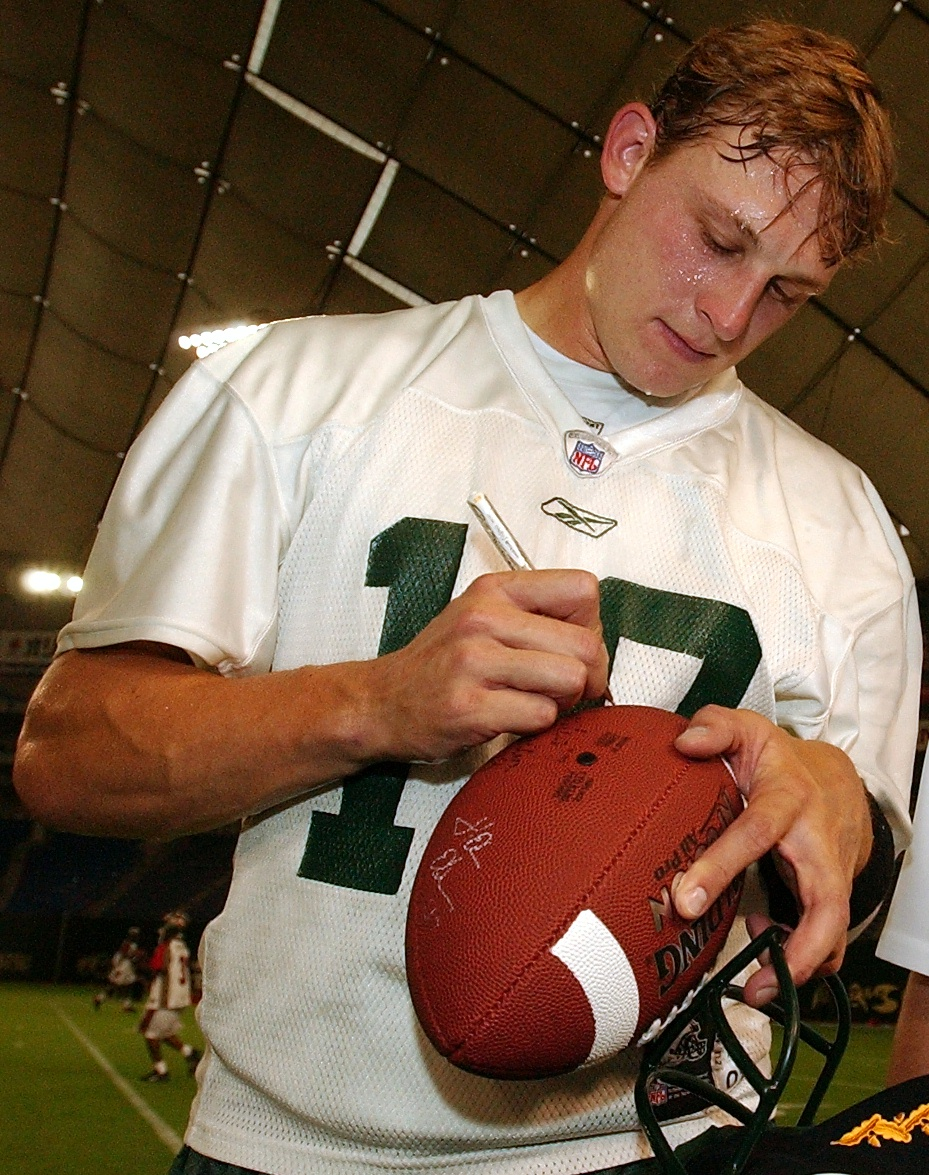
Marshall quarterback Chad Pennington

Statistics	MONT	MAR
First downs	21	17
Plays–yards	77–333	73–358
Rushes–yards	29–49	32–112
Passing yards	281	246
Passing: comp–att–int	29–48–1	23–41–1
Time of possession	30:14	29:46

Team	Category	Player	Statistics
Montana	Passing	Dave Dickenson	29–48, 281 yds, 2 TD, 1 INT
Montana	Rushing	Josh Branen	6 car, 33 yds
Montana	Receiving	Joe Douglass	8 rec, 102 yds
Marshall	Passing	Chad Pennington	23–40, 246 yds, 1 INT
Marshall	Rushing	Chris Parker	23 car, 94 yds, 2 TD
Marshall	Receiving	Jermaine Wiggins	5 rec, 81 yds
