= 1995 South Carolina State Bulldogs football team =

American college football season

1995 South Carolina State Bulldogs football
- Conference: Mid-Eastern Athletic Conference
- Record: 6–4 (4–2 MEAC)
- Head coach: Willie Jeffries (13th season)
- Home stadium: Oliver C. Dawson Stadium

1995 Mid-Eastern Athletic Conference football standings
	Conf.					Overall
Team	W		L		T	W		L		T
No. 16 Florida A&M $	6	–	0	–	0	9	–	3	–	0
Delaware State	5	–	1	–	0	6	–	5	–	0
South Carolina State	4	–	2	–	0	6	–	4	–	0
Howard	2	–	4	–	0	6	–	5	–	0
North Carolina A&T	2	–	4	–	0	4	–	7	–	0
Bethune–Cookman	2	–	4	–	0	3	–	8	–	0
Morgan State	0	–	6	–	0	1	–	10	–	0
$ – Conference champion; Rankings from The Sports Network poll

The 1995 South Carolina State Bulldogs football team represented South Carolina State University as a member of the Mid-Eastern Athletic Conference (MEAC) during the 1995 NCAA Division I-AA football season. Led by 13th-year head coach Willie Jeffries, the Bulldogs compiled an overall record of 6–4, with a mark of 4–2 in conference play, and finished third in the MEAC.

== Schedule ==
Date	Opponent	Site	Result	Attendance	Source
September 2	at No. 24 Georgia Southern*	Paulson Stadium; Statesboro, GA	L 12–27	13,084	
September 9	Furman*	Oliver C. Dawson Stadium; Orangeburg, SC	W 27–21		
September 16	Charleston Southern*	Oliver C. Dawson Stadium; Orangeburg, SC	W 36–8	12,805	
September 30	vs. Tennessee State*	Georgia Dome; Atlanta, GA (Atlanta Football Classic)	L 14–15	52,387	
October 7	at Morgan State	Hughes Stadium; Baltimore, MD	W 31–19		
October 14	at Bethune–Cookman	Municipal Stadium; Daytona Beach, FL	W 42–20		
October 28	Delaware State	Oliver C. Dawson Stadium; Orangeburg, SC	L 7–20	21,202	
November 4	at Howard	William H. Greene Stadium; Washington, DC	W 18–14	10,562	
November 11	No. 20 Florida A&M	Oliver C. Dawson Stadium; Orangeburg, SC	L 21–28	11,109	
November 18	vs. North Carolina A&T	American Legion Memorial Stadium; Charlotte, NC (Carolinas Football Classic)	W 28–27	21,678	
*Non-conference game; Rankings from The Sports Network Poll released prior to the game
