= 1995 East Tennessee State Buccaneers football team =

American college football season

1995 East Tennessee State Buccaneers football
- Conference: Southern Conference
- Record: 4–7 (4–4 SoCon)
- Head coach: Mike Cavan (4th season)
- Home stadium: Memorial Center

1995 Southern Conference football standings
	Conf.					Overall
Team	W		L		T	W		L		T
No. 2 Appalachian State $^	8	–	0	–	0	12	–	1	–	0
No. 6 Marshall ^	7	–	1	–	0	12	–	3	–	0
No. 15 Georgia Southern ^	5	–	3	–	0	9	–	4	–	0
Furman	5	–	3	–	0	6	–	5	–	0
East Tennessee State	4	–	4	–	0	4	–	7	–	0
VMI	3	–	5	–	0	4	–	7	–	0
Chattanooga	2	–	6	–	0	4	–	7	–	0
Western Carolina	2	–	6	–	0	3	–	7	–	0
The Citadel	0	–	8	–	0	2	–	9	–	0
$ – Conference champion; ^ – NCAA Division I-AA playoff participant; Rankings from The Sports Network poll

The 1995 East Tennessee State Buccaneers football team was an American football team that represented East Tennessee State University as a member of the Southern Conference (SoCon) during the 1995 NCAA Division I-AA football season. Led by fourth-year head coach Mike Cavan, the Buccaneers compiled and overall record of 4–7, with a mark of 4–4 in conference play, and finished fifth in the SoCon.

== Schedule ==
Date	Opponent	Site	Result	Attendance	Source
August 31	at No. 15 Troy State*	Veterans Memorial Stadium; Troy, AL	L 7–31	9,321	
September 9	at Toledo*	Glass Bowl; Toledo, OH	L 20–41	29,968	
September 16	at VMI	Alumni Memorial Field; Lexington, VA	L 23–37	6,732	
September 23	at Tulsa*	Skelly Stadium; Tulsa, OK	L 30–45	17,836	
September 30	at No. 2 Appalachian State	Kidd Brewer Stadium; Boone, NC	L 23–30	16,627	
October 7	The Citadel	Memorial Center; Johnson City, TN	W 21–13	6,345	
October 21	at Furman	Paladin Stadium; Greenville, SC	L 15–21		
October 28	No. 13 Georgia Southern	Memorial Center; Johnson City, TN	W 21–16	4,977	
November 4	at No. 7 Marshall	Marshall University Stadium; Huntington, WV	L 0–52	18,749	
November 11	Chattanooga	Memorial Center; Johnson City, TN	W 38–9	6,957	
November 18	Western Carolina	Memorial Center; Johnson City, TN	W 36–10		
*Non-conference game; Rankings from The Sports Network Poll released prior to the game
