= 1995 Penn Quakers football team =

American college football season

1995 Penn Quakers football
- Conference: Ivy League
- Record: 7–3 (5–2 Ivy)
- Head coach: Al Bagnoli (4th season)
- Defensive coordinator: Mike Toop (4th season)
- Home stadium: Franklin Field

1995 Ivy League football standings
	Conf.					Overall
Team	W		L		T	W		L		T
Princeton $	5	–	1	–	1	8	–	1	–	1
Penn	5	–	2	–	0	7	–	3	–	0
Cornell	5	–	2	–	0	6	–	4	–	0
Dartmouth	4	–	2	–	1	7	–	2	–	1
Columbia	3	–	4	–	0	3	–	6	–	1
Brown	2	–	5	–	0	5	–	5	–	0
Yale	2	–	5	–	0	3	–	7	–	0
Harvard	1	–	6	–	0	2	–	8	–	0
$ – Conference champion

The 1995 Penn Quakers football team represented the University of Pennsylvania in the 1995 NCAA Division I-AA football season. A contender for the conference title up until the last week of the season, Penn finished second in the Ivy League.

== Schedule ==
Date	Opponent	Rank	Site	Result	Attendance	Source
September 16	Dartmouth	No. 17	Franklin Field; Philadelphia, PA	W 20–12	12,511	
September 23	at Lafayette*	No. 16	Fisher Field; Easton, PA	W 28–8	7,895	
September 30	Bucknell*	No. 14	Franklin Field; Philadelphia, PA	W 20–19	10,203	
October 7	at Columbia	No. 13	Wien Stadium; New York, NY	L 14–24	7,380	
October 14	at No. 17 William & Mary*	No. 22	Zable Stadium; Williamsburg, VA	L 34–48	8,535	
October 21	Brown		Franklin Field; Philadelphia, PA	W 58–21	11,158	
October 28	at Yale		Yale Bowl; New Haven, CT	W 16–6	16,929	
November 4	Princeton		Franklin Field; Philadelphia, PA (rivalry)	L 9–22	34,504	
November 11	Harvard		Harvard Stadium; Boston, MA (rivalry)	W 38–21	7,622	
November 18	Cornell		Franklin Field; Philadelphia, PA (rivalry)	W 37–18	12,118	
*Non-conference game; Rankings from The Sports Network Poll released prior to the game
