= 1995 New Hampshire Wildcats football team =

American college football season

1995 New Hampshire Wildcats football
- Conference: Yankee Conference
- New England Division
- Record: 6–5 (5–5 Yankee)
- Head coach: Bill Bowes (24th season)
- Offensive coordinator: Sean McDonnell (2nd season)
- Home stadium: Cowell Stadium

1995 Yankee Conference football standings
	Conf.					Overall
Team	W		L		T	W		L		T
New England Division
Rhode Island x	6	–	2	–	0	7	–	4	–	0
No. 23 Connecticut	5	–	3	–	0	8	–	3	–	0
New Hampshire	4	–	4	–	0	6	–	5	–	0
UMass	3	–	5	–	0	6	–	5	–	0
Boston University	1	–	7	–	0	3	–	8	–	0
Maine	1	–	7	–	0	3	–	8	–	0
Mid-Atlantic Division
No. 7 Delaware x$^	8	–	0	–	0	11	–	2	–	0
No. 13 James Madison ^	6	–	2	–	0	8	–	4	–	0
No. 19 William & Mary	5	–	3	–	0	7	–	4	–	0
No. 20 Richmond	5	–	3	–	0	7	–	3	–	1
Northeastern	2	–	6	–	0	4	–	7	–	0
Villanova	2	–	6	–	0	3	–	8	–	0
$ – Conference champion; x – Division champion/co-champions; ^ – NCAA Division I-AA playoff participant; Rankings from The Sports Network poll

The 1995 New Hampshire Wildcats football team was an American football team that represented the University of New Hampshire as a member of the New England Division of the Yankee Conference during the 1995 NCAA Division I-AA football season. In its 24th year under head coach Bill Bowes, the team compiled a 6–5 record (5–5 against conference opponents) and finished in third place in the New England Division.

== Schedule ==
Date	Opponent	Rank	Site	Result	Attendance	Source
September 9	at Connecticut	No. 18	Memorial Stadium; Storrs, CT	L 21–23	11,711	
September 16	Rhode Island	No. 22	Cowell Stadium; Durham, NH	L 7–10	5,077	
September 23	No. 20 William & Mary		Cowell Stadium; Durham, NH	L 0–39	4,266	
September 30	at Lehigh*		Goodman Stadium; Bethlehem, PA	W 35–14	10,293	
October 7	at UMass		McGuirk Stadium; Hadley, MA (rivalry)	W 32–29	11,191	
October 14	No. 7 James Madison		Cowell Stadium; Durham, NH	L 19–23	9,150	
October 21	Maine		Cowell Stadium; Durham, NH (rivalry)	W 21–0	6,237	
October 28	Boston University		Cowell Stadium; Durham, NH	W 35–7	2,450	
November 4	at No. 16 Richmond		City Stadium; Richmond, VA	L 3–7	15,789	
November 11	at Villanova		Villanova Stadium; Villanova, PA	W 12–9	5,722	
November 18	Northeastern		Cowell Stadium; Durham, NH	W 21–10		
*Non-conference game; Rankings from The Sports Network Poll released prior to the game
