= 1995 Lehigh Engineers football team =

American college football season

1995 Lehigh Engineers football

Patriot League champion
- Conference: Patriot League
- Record: 8–3 (5–0 Patriot)
- Head coach: Kevin Higgins (2nd season)
- Offensive coordinator: Dave Clawson (2nd season)
- Captains: Bob Aylsworth; D'Andre Dina; Brian Klingerman; Roman McDonald
- Home stadium: Goodman Stadium

1995 Patriot League football standings
	Conf.					Overall
Team	W		L		T	W		L		T
Lehigh $	5	–	0	–	0	8	–	3	–	0
Bucknell	4	–	1	–	0	7	–	4	–	0
Lafayette	3	–	2	–	0	4	–	6	–	1
Fordham	2	–	3	–	0	4	–	6	–	1
Holy Cross	1	–	4	–	0	2	–	9	–	0
Colgate	0	–	5	–	0	0	–	11	–	0
$ – Conference champion

The 1995 Lehigh Engineers football team was an American football team that represented Lehigh University during the 1995 NCAA Division I-AA football season. Lehigh won the Patriot League championship.

In their eighth and final year under head coach Kevin Higgins, the Engineers compiled an 8–3 record. Bob Aylsworth, D'Andre Dina, Brian Klingerman and Roman McDonald were the team captains.

The Engineers outscored opponents 306 to 272. Lehigh's undefeated (5–0) conference record topped the six-team Patriot League standings. The championship was Lehigh's second in three years. Patriot League rules at the time prohibited members from participating in the national postseason tournament.

This was the last year that Lehigh officially used "Engineers" as its team name. At its November 11 game, the school introduced "the Mountain Hawk" as a costumed mascot, and the team name reflected this change in time for the 1996 season.

Lehigh played its home games at Goodman Stadium on the university's Goodman Campus in Bethlehem, Pennsylvania.

== Schedule ==
Date	Opponent	Site	Result	Attendance	Source
September 9	at Army*	Michie Stadium; West Point, NY	L 9–42	25,631	
September 16	at Colgate	Andy Kerr Stadium; Hamilton, NY	W 20–9	4,500	
September 23	Yale*	Goodman Stadium; Bethlehem, PA	W 21–10	7,228	
September 30	New Hampshire*	Goodman Stadium; Bethlehem, PA	L 14–35	10,293	
October 7	at Bucknell	Christy Mathewson–Memorial Stadium; Lewisburg, PA	W 30–23	8,418	
October 14	at Columbia*	Wien Stadium; New York, NY	W 37–35	3,045	
October 21	Cornell*	Goodman Stadium; Bethlehem, PA	W 34–23	7,553	
October 28	at UMass*	McGuirk Stadium; Hadley, MA	L 36–44	5,871	
November 4	at Fordham*	Coffey Field; Bronx, NY	W 17–0	1,987	
November 11	Holy Cross	Goodman Stadium; Bethlehem, PA	W 51–21	11,254	
November 18	Lafayette	Goodman Stadium; Bethlehem, PA (The Rivalry)	W 37–30 ^{2OT}	15,412	
*Non-conference game
