= 1995 Maine Black Bears football team =

American college football season

1995 Maine Black Bears football
- Conference: Yankee Conference
- Record: 3–8 (1–7 Yankee)
- Head coach: Jack Cosgrove (3rd season)
- Defensive coordinator: Neil McGrath (1st season)
- Captains: Ray Bauer; Brian Gaine; Joe Robinson
- Home stadium: Alumni Field

1995 Yankee Conference football standings
	Conf.					Overall
Team	W		L		T	W		L		T
New England Division
Rhode Island x	6	–	2	–	0	7	–	4	–	0
No. 23 Connecticut	5	–	3	–	0	8	–	3	–	0
New Hampshire	4	–	4	–	0	6	–	5	–	0
UMass	3	–	5	–	0	6	–	5	–	0
Boston University	1	–	7	–	0	3	–	8	–	0
Maine	1	–	7	–	0	3	–	8	–	0
Mid-Atlantic Division
No. 7 Delaware x$^	8	–	0	–	0	11	–	2	–	0
No. 13 James Madison ^	6	–	2	–	0	8	–	4	–	0
No. 19 William & Mary	5	–	3	–	0	7	–	4	–	0
No. 20 Richmond	5	–	3	–	0	7	–	3	–	1
Northeastern	2	–	6	–	0	4	–	7	–	0
Villanova	2	–	6	–	0	3	–	8	–	0
$ – Conference champion; x – Division champion/co-champions; ^ – NCAA Division I-AA playoff participant; Rankings from The Sports Network poll

The 1995 Maine Black Bears football team was an American football team that represented the University of Maine as a member of the Yankee Conference during the 1995 NCAA Division I-AA football season. In their third season under head coach Jack Cosgrove, the Black Bears compiled a 3–8 record (1–7 against conference opponents) and tied for last place in the New England Division of the Yankee Conference. Ray Bauer, Brian Gaine, and Joe Robinson were the team captains.

== Schedule ==
Date	Opponent	Site	Result	Attendance	Source
September 2	Lock Haven*	Alumni Field; Orono, ME	W 41–15	4,018	
September 9	at Rhode Island	Meade Stadium; Kingston, RI	L 13–17	4,124	
September 16	at No. 18 Boston University	Nickerson Field; Boston, MA	L 21–40	6,034	
September 30	No. 7 James Madison	Alumni Field; Orono, ME	L 17–21	5,930	
October 7	at Buffalo*	University at Buffalo Stadium; Amherst, NY	W 19–6	2,825	
October 14	No. 20 Connecticut	Alumi Field; Orono, ME	L 30–31	8,007	
October 21	at New Hampshire	Cowell Stadium; Durham, NH (rivalry)	L 0–21	6,237	
October 28	at No. 5 Delaware	Delaware Stadium; Newark, DE	L 0–61	22,293	
November 4	UMass	Alumni Field; Orono, ME	W 24–21 ^{OT}	2,139	
November 11	Northeastern	Alumni Field; Orono, ME	L 28–31		
November 18	at UCF*	Florida Citrus Bowl; Orlando, FL	L 17–37	11,119	
*Non-conference game; Rankings from The Sports Network Poll released prior to the game
