= 1995 Florida A&M Rattlers football team =

American college football season

1995 Florida A&M Rattlers football

MEAC champion

Heritage Bowl, L 25–30 vs. Southern
- Conference: Mid-Eastern Athletic Conference

Ranking
- Sports Network: No. 16
- Record: 9–3 (6–0 MEAC)
- Head coach: Billy Joe (2nd season)
- Offensive scheme: Gulf Coast
- Home stadium: Bragg Memorial Stadium

1995 Mid-Eastern Athletic Conference football standings
	Conf.					Overall
Team	W		L		T	W		L		T
No. 16 Florida A&M $	6	–	0	–	0	9	–	3	–	0
Delaware State	5	–	1	–	0	6	–	5	–	0
South Carolina State	4	–	2	–	0	6	–	4	–	0
Howard	2	–	4	–	0	6	–	5	–	0
North Carolina A&T	2	–	4	–	0	4	–	7	–	0
Bethune–Cookman	2	–	4	–	0	3	–	8	–	0
Morgan State	0	–	6	–	0	1	–	10	–	0
$ – Conference champion; Rankings from The Sports Network poll

The 1995 Florida A&M Rattlers football team represented Florida A&M University as a member of the Mid-Eastern Athletic Conference (MEAC) during the 1995 NCAA Division I-AA football season. The Rattlers were led by second-year head coach Billy Joe and played their home games at Bragg Memorial Stadium in Tallahassee, Florida. They finished the season with an overall record of 9–3 and a mark of 6–0 in conference play, winning the MEAC title. Florida A&M was invited to the Heritage Bowl, where they lost to Southern.

== Schedule ==
Date	Time	Opponent	Rank	Site	Result	Attendance	Source
September 2		Tuskegee*	No. 23	Bragg Memorial Stadium; Tallahassee, FL	W 28–16		
September 9	4:00 p.m.	at No. 19 (I-A) Miami (FL)*	No. 25	Miami Orange Bowl; Miami, FL	L 3–49	57,721	
September 16		Jackson State*		Bragg Memorial Stadium; Tallahassee, FL	W 15–12	13,914	
September 23	7:00 p.m.	vs. Tennessee State*		Florida Citrus Bowl; Orlando, FL (Orlando Weekend Classic)	W 24–7	20,079	
September 30		at Howard	No. 23	William H. Greene Stadium; Washington, DC	W 29–18	13,567	
October 7		North Carolina A&T	No. 23	Bragg Memorial Stadium; Tallahassee, FL	W 20–3	29,785	
October 14		Delaware State	No. 21	Bragg Memorial Stadium; Tallahassee, FL	W 24–21	13,181	
October 28		Morgan State^{†}	No. 17	Bragg Memorial Stadium; Tallahassee, FL	W 47–9	27,767	
November 4	2:00 p.m.	vs. No. 12 Southern*	No. 14	Georgia Dome; Atlanta, GA	L 38–52	33,700	
November 11		at South Carolina State	No. 20	Oliver C. Dawson Stadium; Orangeburg, SC	W 28–21	11,109	
November 25		vs. Bethune–Cookman	No. 16	Tampa Stadium; Tampa, FL (Florida Classic)	W 43–0	37,006	
December 29		vs. No. 11 Southern*	No. 16	Georgia Dome; Atlanta, GA (Heritage Bowl)	L 25–30	25,164	
*Non-conference game; ^{†}Homecoming; Rankings from The Sports Network Poll released prior to the game; All times are in Eastern time
