= 1995 Boston University Terriers football team =

American college football season

1995 Boston University Terriers football
- Conference: Yankee Conference
- New England Division
- Record: 3–8 (1–7 Yankee)
- Head coach: Dan Allen (6th season)
- Defensive coordinator: Tom Quinn (1st season)
- Home stadium: Nickerson Field

1995 Yankee Conference football standings
	Conf.					Overall
Team	W		L		T	W		L		T
New England Division
Rhode Island x	6	–	2	–	0	7	–	4	–	0
No. 23 Connecticut	5	–	3	–	0	8	–	3	–	0
New Hampshire	4	–	4	–	0	6	–	5	–	0
UMass	3	–	5	–	0	6	–	5	–	0
Boston University	1	–	7	–	0	3	–	8	–	0
Maine	1	–	7	–	0	3	–	8	–	0
Mid-Atlantic Division
No. 7 Delaware x$^	8	–	0	–	0	11	–	2	–	0
No. 13 James Madison ^	6	–	2	–	0	8	–	4	–	0
No. 19 William & Mary	5	–	3	–	0	7	–	4	–	0
No. 20 Richmond	5	–	3	–	0	7	–	3	–	1
Northeastern	2	–	6	–	0	4	–	7	–	0
Villanova	2	–	6	–	0	3	–	8	–	0
$ – Conference champion; x – Division champion/co-champions; ^ – NCAA Division I-AA playoff participant; Rankings from The Sports Network poll

The 1995 Boston University Terriers football team was an American football team that represented Boston University as a member of the Yankee Conference during the 1995 NCAA Division I-AA football season. In their sixth season under head coach Dan Allen, the Terriers compiled a 3–8 record (1–7 against conference opponents), tied for last place in the New England Division of the Yankee Conference, and were outscored by a total of 304 to 250.

== Schedule ==
Date	Opponent	Rank	Site	Result	Attendance	Source
September 8	Villanova	No. 22	Villanova Stadium; Villanova, PA	W 21–16	6,327	
September 16	Maine	No. 18	Nickerson Field; Boston, MA	W 40–21	6,034	
September 23	No. 11 Delaware*	No. 15	Nickerson Field; Boston, MA	L 29–41	4,697	
September 30	at No. 16 Richmond	No. 21	City Stadium; Richmond, VA	L 6–21	11,891	
October 7	at No. 7 James Madison		Bridgeforth Stadium; Harrisonburg, VA	L 31–38	17,000	
October 14	Rhode Island^{†}		Nickerson Field; Boston, MA	L 19–22	8,201	
October 21	Northeastern		Nickerson Field; Boston, MA	L 3–14	1,397	
October 28	at New Hampshire		Cowell Stadium; Durham, NH	L 7–35	2,450	
November 4	at No. 25 Connecticut		Memorial Stadium; Storrs, CT	L 17–28		
November 11	UMass		Nickerson Field; Boston, MA	L 23–28	6,095	
November 18	at Buffalo*		University at Buffalo Stadium; Amherst, NY	W 54–40		
*Non-conference game; ^{†}Homecoming; Rankings from The Sports Network Poll released prior to the game
