= 1995 Columbia Lions football team =

American college football season

1995 Columbia Lions football
- Conference: Ivy League
- Record: 3–6–1 (3–4 Ivy)
- Head coach: Ray Tellier (7th season)
- Defensive coordinator: Mike Donnelly (4th season)
- Captains: Mike Cavanaugh; Eric Keck; Rory Wilfork
- Home stadium: Wien Stadium

1995 Ivy League football standings
	Conf.					Overall
Team	W		L		T	W		L		T
Princeton $	5	–	1	–	1	8	–	1	–	1
Penn	5	–	2	–	0	7	–	3	–	0
Cornell	5	–	2	–	0	6	–	4	–	0
Dartmouth	4	–	2	–	1	7	–	2	–	1
Columbia	3	–	4	–	0	3	–	6	–	1
Brown	2	–	5	–	0	5	–	5	–	0
Yale	2	–	5	–	0	3	–	7	–	0
Harvard	1	–	6	–	0	2	–	8	–	0
$ – Conference champion

The 1995 Columbia Lions football team was an American football team that represented Columbia University during the 1995 NCAA Division I-AA football season. Columbia finished fifth in the Ivy League.

In their seventh season under head coach Ray Tellier, the Lions compiled a 3–6–1 record and were outscored 281 to 201. Mike Cavanaugh, Eric Keck and Rory Wilfork were the team captains.

The Lions' 3–4 conference record placed fifth in the Ivy League standings. Columbia was outscored 200 to 142 by Ivy opponents.

Columbia played its homes games at Lawrence A. Wien Stadium in Upper Manhattan, in New York City.

== Schedule ==
Date	Opponent	Site	Result	Attendance	Source
September 16	at Harvard	Harvard Stadium; Boston, MA	W 28–24	8,150	
September 23	Saint Mary's (CA)*	Wien Stadium; New York, NY	L 14–34	4,260	
September 30	at Lafayette*	Fisher Field; Easton, PA	T 10–10	8,156	
October 7	No. 13 Penn^{†}	Wien Stadium; New York, NY	W 24–14	7,380	
October 14	Lehigh*	Wien Stadium; New York, NY	L 35–37	3,045	
October 21	Yale^{†}	Wien Stadium; New York, NY	W 21–7	3,875	
October 28	at Princeton	Palmer Stadium; Princeton, NJ	L 14–44	10,917	
November 4	Dartmouth	Wien Stadium; New York, NY	L 27–43	5,780	
November 11	at Cornell	Schoellkopf Field; Ithaca, NY (rivalry)	L 14–35	5,673	
November 18	at Brown	Brown Stadium; Providence, RI	L 14–33	2,289	
*Non-conference game; ^{†}Homecoming; Rankings from The Sports Network Poll released prior to the game
