= 1995 William & Mary Tribe football team =

American college football season

1995 William & Mary Tribe football
- Conference: Yankee Conference
- Mid-Atlantic Division

Ranking
- Sports Network: No. 19
- Record: 7–4 (5–3 Yankee)
- Head coach: Jimmye Laycock (16th season)
- Offensive coordinator: Zbig Kepa (3rd season)
- Defensive coordinator: Joe Bottiglieri (5th season)
- Captains: Terry Hammons; Jim Simpkins
- Home stadium: Zable Stadium

1995 Yankee Conference football standings
	Conf.					Overall
Team	W		L		T	W		L		T
New England Division
Rhode Island x	6	–	2	–	0	7	–	4	–	0
No. 23 Connecticut	5	–	3	–	0	8	–	3	–	0
New Hampshire	4	–	4	–	0	6	–	5	–	0
UMass	3	–	5	–	0	6	–	5	–	0
Boston University	1	–	7	–	0	3	–	8	–	0
Maine	1	–	7	–	0	3	–	8	–	0
Mid-Atlantic Division
No. 7 Delaware x$^	8	–	0	–	0	11	–	2	–	0
No. 13 James Madison ^	6	–	2	–	0	8	–	4	–	0
No. 19 William & Mary	5	–	3	–	0	7	–	4	–	0
No. 20 Richmond	5	–	3	–	0	7	–	3	–	1
Northeastern	2	–	6	–	0	4	–	7	–	0
Villanova	2	–	6	–	0	3	–	8	–	0
$ – Conference champion; x – Division champion/co-champions; ^ – NCAA Division I-AA playoff participant; Rankings from The Sports Network poll

The 1995 William & Mary Tribe football team represented the College of William & Mary as member of the Mid-Atlantic Division of the Yankee Conference during the 1995 NCAA Division I-AA football season. Led by Jimmye Laycock in his 16th year as head coach, William & Mary finished the season with an overall record of 7–4 and a mark of 5–3 in Yankee Conference play, tying for third place the Mid-Atlantic Division. They were ranked No. 19 in the final Sports Network poll, but did not receive a bid to the NCAA Division I-AA playoffs.

== Schedule ==
Date	Opponent	Rank	Site	Result	Attendance	Source
September 2	at No. 17 (I-A) Virginia*	No. 12	Scott Stadium; Charlottesville, VA	L 16–40	38,300	
September 9	No. 7 James Madison	No. 16	Zable Stadium; Williamsburg, VA (rivalry)	L 17–24	13,871	
September 16	at Northeastern	No. 19	Parsons Field; Brookline, MA	W 32–0	2,400	
September 23	at New Hampshire	No. 20	Cowell Stadium; Durham, NH	W 39–0	4,266	
September 30	at VMI*	No. 18	Alumni Memorial Field; Lexington, VA (rivalry)	W 27–7	7,896	
October 7	Rhode Island	No. 17	Zable Stadium; Williamsburg, VA	W 23–14	7,230	
October 14	No. 22 Penn*	No. 17	Zable Stadium; Williamsburg, VA	W 48–34	8,535	
October 21	at UMass	No. 12	Warren McGuirk Alumni Stadium; Hadley, MA	L 9–20	5,011	
October 28	Villanova	No. 20	Zable Stadium; Williamsburg, VA	W 18–15	13,925	
November 4	at No. 5 Delaware	No. 18	Delaware Stadium; Newark, DE (rivalry)	L 20–23	17,317	
November 11	No. 13 Richmond	No. 25	Zable Stadium; Williamsburg, VA (rivalry)	W 27–7	12,779	
*Non-conference game; Rankings from The Sports Network Poll released prior to the game

== Roster ==
1995 William & Mary Tribe football team roster
Players			Coaches
Offense: Pos. / # / Name / Class	Defense: Pos. / # / Name / Class; DB / 12 / Darren Sharper / Jr	Special teams: Pos. / # / Name / Class	Head coach: Jimmye Laycock; Coordinators/assistant coaches Legend: (C) Team captain; (S) Suspended; (I) Ineligible; Injured; Redshirt
