= 1995 Delaware State Hornets football team =

American college football season

1995 Delaware State Hornets football
- Conference: Mid-Eastern Athletic Conference
- Record: 6–5 (5–1 MEAC)
- Head coach: Bill Collick (11th season)
- Home stadium: Alumni Stadium

1995 Mid-Eastern Athletic Conference football standings
	Conf.					Overall
Team	W		L		T	W		L		T
No. 16 Florida A&M $	6	–	0	–	0	9	–	3	–	0
Delaware State	5	–	1	–	0	6	–	5	–	0
South Carolina State	4	–	2	–	0	6	–	4	–	0
Howard	2	–	4	–	0	6	–	5	–	0
North Carolina A&T	2	–	4	–	0	4	–	7	–	0
Bethune–Cookman	2	–	4	–	0	3	–	8	–	0
Morgan State	0	–	6	–	0	1	–	10	–	0
$ – Conference champion; Rankings from The Sports Network poll

The 1995 Delaware State Hornets football team represented Delaware State College (now known as Delaware State University) as a member of the Mid-Eastern Athletic Conference (MEAC) during the 1995 NCAA Division I-AA football season. Led by 11th-year head coach Bill Collick, the Hornets compiled an overall record of 6–5, with a mark of 5–1 in conference play, and finished second in the MEAC.

== Schedule ==
Date	Opponent	Site	Result	Attendance	Source
September 2	Rhode Island*	Alumni Stadium; Dover, DE	L 14–17	3,982	
September 16	at No. 23 Western Illinois*	Hanson Field; Macomb, IL	L 14–41		
September 23	Liberty*	Alumni Stadium; Dover, DE	L 14–41		
September 30	Norfolk State*	Alumni Stadium; Dover, DE	W 20–14		
October 7	at Hampton*	Armstrong Stadium; Hampton, VA	L 21–51	4,114	
October 14	at No. 21 Florida A&M	Bragg Memorial Stadium; Tallahassee, FL	L 21–24	13,181	
October 21	Morgan State^{†}	Alumni Stadium; Dover, DE	W 41–17	4,810	
October 28	at South Carolina State	Oliver C. Dawson Stadium; Orangeburg, SC	W 20–7	21,202	
November 4	at North Carolina A&T	Aggie Stadium; Greensboro, NC	W 17–10	6,526	
November 11	Bethune–Cookman	Alumni Stadium; Dover, DE	W 30–20		
November 18	Howard	Alumni Stadium; Dover, DE	W 20–13		
*Non-conference game; ^{†}Homecoming; Rankings from The Sports Network Poll released prior to the game
