= 1995 Brown Bears football team =

American college football season

1995 Brown Bears football
- Conference: Ivy League
- Record: 5–5 (2–5 Ivy)
- Head coach: Mark Whipple (2nd season)
- Captain: Paul Fichiera
- Home stadium: Brown Stadium

1995 Ivy League football standings
	Conf.					Overall
Team	W		L		T	W		L		T
Princeton $	5	–	1	–	1	8	–	1	–	1
Penn	5	–	2	–	0	7	–	3	–	0
Cornell	5	–	2	–	0	6	–	4	–	0
Dartmouth	4	–	2	–	1	7	–	2	–	1
Columbia	3	–	4	–	0	3	–	6	–	1
Brown	2	–	5	–	0	5	–	5	–	0
Yale	2	–	5	–	0	3	–	7	–	0
Harvard	1	–	6	–	0	2	–	8	–	0
$ – Conference champion

The 1995 Brown Bears football team was an American football team that represented Brown University during the 1995 NCAA Division I-AA football season. Brown tied for second-to-last in the Ivy League.

In their second season under head coach Mark Whipple, the Bears compiled a 5–5 record and outscored opponents 282 to 239. Paul Fichiera was the team captain.

The Bears' 2–5 conference record tied for sixth place in the Ivy League standings. Despite a losing league record, they outscored Ivy opponents 193 to 191.

Brown played its home games at Brown Stadium in Providence, Rhode Island.

== Schedule ==
Date	Opponent	Site	Result	Attendance	Source
September 16	at Yale	Yale Bowl; New Haven, CT	L 38–42	14,095	
September 23	Rhode Island*	Brown Stadium; Providence, RI (rivalry)	W 31–28	4,052	
September 30	at Holy Cross*	Fitton Field; Worcester, MA	W 37–14	8,564	
October 7	Princeton	Brown Stadium; Providence, RI	L 19–21	2,396	
October 14	Colgate*	Brown Stadium; Providence, RI	W 21–6	2,366	
October 21	at Penn	Franklin Field; Philadelphia, PA	L 21–58	11,158	
October 28	Cornell	Brown Stadium; Providence, RI	L 28–38	2,574	
November 4	Harvard	Brown Stadium; Providence, RI	W 47–8		
November 11	at Dartmouth	Memorial Field; Hanover, NH	L 7–10	4,711	
November 18	Columbia	Brown Stadium; Providence, RI	W 33–14	2,289	
*Non-conference game
