= 1995 Morgan State Bears football team =

American college football season

1995 Morgan State Bears football
- Conference: Mid-Eastern Athletic Conference
- Record: 1–10 (0–6 MEAC)
- Head coach: Ricky Diggs (5th season)
- Home stadium: Hughes Stadium

1995 Mid-Eastern Athletic Conference football standings
	Conf.					Overall
Team	W		L		T	W		L		T
No. 16 Florida A&M $	6	–	0	–	0	9	–	3	–	0
Delaware State	5	–	1	–	0	6	–	5	–	0
South Carolina State	4	–	2	–	0	6	–	4	–	0
Howard	2	–	4	–	0	6	–	5	–	0
North Carolina A&T	2	–	4	–	0	4	–	7	–	0
Bethune–Cookman	2	–	4	–	0	3	–	8	–	0
Morgan State	0	–	6	–	0	1	–	10	–	0
$ – Conference champion; Rankings from The Sports Network poll

The 1995 Morgan State Bears football team represented Morgan State University as a member of the Mid-Eastern Athletic Conference (MEAC) during the 1995 NCAA Division I-AA football season. Led by fifth-year head coach Ricky Diggs, the Bears compiled an overall record of 1–10, with a mark of 0–6 in conference play, and finished seventh in the MEAC.

== Schedule ==
Date	Opponent	Site	Result	Attendance	Source
September 2	at No. 7 James Madison*	Bridgeforth Stadium; Harrisonburg, VA	L 7–76	12,500	
September 9	at Bethune–Cookman	Municipal Stadium; Daytona Beach, FL	L 10–33	2,907	
September 16	at Liberty*	Williams Stadium; Lynchburg, VA	L 19–48		
September 23	Cheyney*	Hughes Stadium; Baltimore, MD	W 38–7	1,502	
October 7	South Carolina State	Hughes Stadium; Baltimore, MD	L 19–31		
October 14	North Carolina A&T	Hughes Stadium; Baltimore, MD	L 32–38	5,569	
October 21	at Delaware State	Alumni Stadium; Dover, DE	L 17–41	4,810	
October 28	at No. 17 Florida A&M	Bragg Memorial Stadium; Tallahassee, FL	L 9–47	27,767	
November 4	at Samford*	Seibert Stadium; Homewood, AL	L 24–35	4,128	
November 11	Howard	Hughes Stadium; Baltimore, MD (rivalry)	L 17–29	2,939	
November 18	at Hampton*	Armstrong Stadium; Hampton, VA	L 20–54	3,190	
*Non-conference game; Rankings from The Sports Network Poll released prior to the game
