= 1995 Northeastern Huskies football team =

American college football season

1995 Northeastern Huskies football
- Conference: Yankee Conference
- Mid-Atlantic Division
- Record: 4–7 (2–6 Yankee)
- Head coach: Barry Gallup (5th season)
- Home stadium: Parsons Field

1995 Yankee Conference football standings
	Conf.					Overall
Team	W		L		T	W		L		T
New England Division
Rhode Island x	6	–	2	–	0	7	–	4	–	0
No. 23 Connecticut	5	–	3	–	0	8	–	3	–	0
New Hampshire	4	–	4	–	0	6	–	5	–	0
UMass	3	–	5	–	0	6	–	5	–	0
Boston University	1	–	7	–	0	3	–	8	–	0
Maine	1	–	7	–	0	3	–	8	–	0
Mid-Atlantic Division
No. 7 Delaware x$^	8	–	0	–	0	11	–	2	–	0
No. 13 James Madison ^	6	–	2	–	0	8	–	4	–	0
No. 19 William & Mary	5	–	3	–	0	7	–	4	–	0
No. 20 Richmond	5	–	3	–	0	7	–	3	–	1
Northeastern	2	–	6	–	0	4	–	7	–	0
Villanova	2	–	6	–	0	3	–	8	–	0
$ – Conference champion; x – Division champion/co-champions; ^ – NCAA Division I-AA playoff participant; Rankings from The Sports Network poll

The 1995 Northeastern Huskies football team was an American football team that represented Northeastern University as a member of the Mid-Atlantic Division of the Yankee Conference during the 1995 NCAA Division I-AA football season. Led by fifth-year head coach Barry Gallup, the team compiled an overall record of 4–7 with a mark of 2–6 in conference play, tying for fifth place in the Mid-Atlantic Division.

== Schedule ==
Date	Opponent	Site	Result	Attendance	Source
September 9	Colgate*	Parsons Field; Brookline, MA	W 44–3	2,800	
September 16	No. 19 William & Mary	Parsons Field; Brookline, MA	L 0–32	2,400	
September 23	UMass	Parsons Field; Brookline, MA	L 19–21	3,500	
September 30	No. 10 Delaware	Parsons Field; Brookline, MA	L 10–37	4,100	
October 7	at No. 12 Richmond	UR Stadium; Richmond, VA	L 23–26 ^{2OT}	9,227	
October 14	at Villanova	Villanova Stadium; Villanova, PA	L 24–27	2,721	
October 21	at Boston University	Nickerson Field; Boston, MA	W 14–3	1,397	
October 28	at No. 21 Connecticut	Memorial Stadium; Storrs, CT	W 10–9		
November 4	No. 21 James Madison	Parsons Field; Brookline, MA	L 13–27	5,800	
November 11	at Maine	Alumni Field; Orono, ME	W 31–28		
November 18	at New Hampshire	Cowell Stadium; Durham, NH	L 10–21		
*Non-conference game; Rankings from The Sports Network Poll released prior to the game
