= 1995 Yale Bulldogs football team =

American college football season

1995 Yale Bulldogs football
- Conference: Ivy League
- Record: 3–7 (2–5 Ivy)
- Head coach: Carmen Cozza (31st season)
- Defensive coordinator: Bob Shoop (2nd season)
- Home stadium: Yale Bowl

1995 Ivy League football standings
	Conf.					Overall
Team	W		L		T	W		L		T
Princeton $	5	–	1	–	1	8	–	1	–	1
Penn	5	–	2	–	0	7	–	3	–	0
Cornell	5	–	2	–	0	6	–	4	–	0
Dartmouth	4	–	2	–	1	7	–	2	–	1
Columbia	3	–	4	–	0	3	–	6	–	1
Brown	2	–	5	–	0	5	–	5	–	0
Yale	2	–	5	–	0	3	–	7	–	0
Harvard	1	–	6	–	0	2	–	8	–	0
$ – Conference champion

The 1995 Yale Bulldogs football team represented Yale University in the 1995 NCAA Division I-AA football season. The Bulldogs were led by 31st-year head coach Carmen Cozza, played their home games at the Yale Bowl and finished in seventh place in the Ivy League with a 2–5 record, 3–7 overall.

== Schedule ==
Date	Opponent	Site	Result	Attendance	Source
September 16	Brown	Yale Bowl; New Haven, CT	W 43–28	14,095	
September 23	at Lehigh*	Goodman Stadium; Bethlehem, PA	L 10–21	7,228	
September 30	Connecticut*	Yale Bowl; New Haven, CT	L 20–39	20,861	
October 7	at Holy Cross*	Fitton Field; Worcester, MA	W 28–17	4,812	
October 14	Dartmouth	Yale Bowl; New Haven, CT	L 7–22	14,729	
October 21	at Columbia	Wien Stadium; New York, NY	L 7–21	3,875	
October 28	Penn	Yale Bowl; New Haven, CT	L 6–16	16,929	
November 4	at Cornell	Schoellkopf Field; Ithaca, NY	L 10–38	9,148	
November 11	at Princeton	Palmer Stadium; Princeton, NJ (rivalry)	W 21–13		
November 18	Harvard	Yale Bowl; New Haven, CT (The Game)	L 21–22	35,103	
*Non-conference game

== Roster ==
1995 Yale Bulldogs football team roster
Players
Coaches
Offense

Pos.	#	Name	Class
WR	4	Heath Ackley
QB	7	Chris Hetherington	Sr
C	66	Jack Hill
WR	81	Mike Potkay
QB	10	Benjimin Steinberg

Defense

Pos.	#	Name	Class

Special teams

Pos.	#	Name	Class
PK	1	John Lafferty

Head coach

- Carmen Cozza

Coordinators/assistant coaches

Legend

- (C) Team captain
- (S) Suspended
- (I) Ineligible
- Injured
- Redshirt
