= 1995 Bethune–Cookman Wildcats football team =

American college football season

1995 Bethune–Cookman Wildcats football
- Conference: Mid-Eastern Athletic Conference
- Record: 3–8 (2–4 MEAC)
- Head coach: Cy McClairen (14th season)
- Home stadium: Municipal Stadium

1995 Mid-Eastern Athletic Conference football standings
	Conf.					Overall
Team	W		L		T	W		L		T
No. 16 Florida A&M $	6	–	0	–	0	9	–	3	–	0
Delaware State	5	–	1	–	0	6	–	5	–	0
South Carolina State	4	–	2	–	0	6	–	4	–	0
Howard	2	–	4	–	0	6	–	5	–	0
North Carolina A&T	2	–	4	–	0	4	–	7	–	0
Bethune–Cookman	2	–	4	–	0	3	–	8	–	0
Morgan State	0	–	6	–	0	1	–	10	–	0
$ – Conference champion; Rankings from The Sports Network poll

The 1995 Bethune–Cookman Wildcats football team represented Bethune–Cookman College (now known as Bethune–Cookman University) as a member of the Mid-Eastern Athletic Conference (MEAC) during the 1995 NCAA Division I-AA football season. Led by 14th-year head coach Cy McClairen, the Wildcats compiled an overall record of 3–8, with a mark of 2–4 in conference play, and finished tied for fourth in the MEAC.

== Schedule ==
Date	Opponent	Site	Result	Attendance	Source
September 2	vs. Howard	Lockhart Stadium; Fort Lauderdale, FL (South Florida Football Classic)	W 25–15	8,500	
September 9	Morgan State	Municipal Stadium; Daytona Beach, FL	W 33–10	2,907	
September 16	at Chattanooga*	Chamberlain Field; Chattanooga, TN	L 6–35	7,009	
September 30	vs. Hampton*	Jacksonville Municipal Stadium; Jacksonville, FL	L 14–34	8,823	
October 7	at Norfolk State*	Foreman Field; Norfolk, VA	L 33–35	8,716	
October 14	South Carolina State	Municipal Stadium; Daytona Beach, FL	L 20–42		
October 21	at Albany State*	Mills Stadium; Albany, GA	W 40–28		
October 28	North Carolina A&T	Municipal Stadium; Daytona Beach, FL	L 21–24		
November 4	at UCF*	Florida Citrus Bowl; Orlando, FL	L 7–38	16,002	
November 11	at Delaware State	Alumni Stadium; Dover, DE	L 20–30		
November 25	vs. No. 16 Florida A&M	Tampa Stadium; Tampa, FL (Florida Classic)	L 0–43	37,006	
*Non-conference game; Rankings from The Sports Network Poll released prior to the game
