= 1995 Colgate Red Raiders football team =

American college football season

1995 Colgate Red Raiders football
- Conference: Patriot League
- Record: 0–11 (0–5 Patriot)
- Head coach: Ed Sweeney (3rd season)
- Captains: Rob Howard; Joe Kasztejna; Tom Morelli; Ian Prisuta
- Home stadium: Andy Kerr Stadium

1995 Patriot League football standings
	Conf.					Overall
Team	W		L		T	W		L		T
Lehigh $	5	–	0	–	0	8	–	3	–	0
Bucknell	4	–	1	–	0	7	–	4	–	0
Lafayette	3	–	2	–	0	4	–	6	–	1
Fordham	2	–	3	–	0	4	–	6	–	1
Holy Cross	1	–	4	–	0	2	–	9	–	0
Colgate	0	–	5	–	0	0	–	11	–	0
$ – Conference champion

The 1995 Colgate Red Raiders football team was an American football team that represented Colgate University during the 1995 NCAA Division I-AA football season. Colgate was winless and finished last in the Patriot League.

In its third and final season under head coach Ed Sweeney, the team compiled a 0–11 record. Joe Kasztejna, Ian Prisuta, Rob Howard and Tom Morelli were the team captains.

The Red Raiders were outscored 367 to 134. Colgate's 0–5 conference record was the worst in the six-team Patriot League standings.

The team played its home games at Andy Kerr Stadium in Hamilton, New York.

== Schedule ==
Date	Opponent	Site	Result	Attendance	Source
September 9	at Northeastern*	Parsons Field; Brookline, MA	L 3–44	2,800	
September 16	Lehigh	Andy Kerr Stadium; Hamilton, NY	L 9–20	4,500	
September 23	Harvard*	Andy Kerr Stadium; Hamilton, NY	L 8–28	3,000	
September 30	Princeton*	Andy Kerr Stadium; Hamilton, NY	L 23–34	5,000	
October 7	Fordham	Andy Kerr Stadium; Hamilton, NY	L 14–34	1,100	
October 14	at Brown*	Brown Stadium; Providence, RI	L 6–21	2,366	
October 21	at Dartmouth*	Memorial Field; Hanover, NH	L 14–35	6,021	
October 28	at Army*	Michie Stadium; West Point, NY	L 14–56	37,292	
November 4	at Lafayette	Fisher Field; Easton, PA	L 9–35	4,065	
November 11	Bucknell	Andy Kerr Stadium; Hamilton, NY	L 14–21 ^{OT}	1,000	
November 18	at Holy Cross	Fitton Field; Worcester, MA	L 20–39	6,423	
*Non-conference game
