= 1995 Harvard Crimson football team =

American college football season

1995 Harvard Crimson football
- Conference: Ivy League
- Record: 2–8 (1–6 Ivy)
- Head coach: Timothy Murphy (2nd season)
- Offensive coordinator: Michael Foley (2nd season)
- Offensive scheme: Multiple
- Defensive coordinator: Mark Harriman (2nd season)
- Captain: Justin Frantz
- Home stadium: Harvard Stadium

1995 Ivy League football standings
	Conf.					Overall
Team	W		L		T	W		L		T
Princeton $	5	–	1	–	1	8	–	1	–	1
Penn	5	–	2	–	0	7	–	3	–	0
Cornell	5	–	2	–	0	6	–	4	–	0
Dartmouth	4	–	2	–	1	7	–	2	–	1
Columbia	3	–	4	–	0	3	–	6	–	1
Brown	2	–	5	–	0	5	–	5	–	0
Yale	2	–	5	–	0	3	–	7	–	0
Harvard	1	–	6	–	0	2	–	8	–	0
$ – Conference champion

The 1995 Harvard Crimson football team was an American football team that represented Harvard University during the 1995 NCAA Division I-AA football season. Harvard finished last in the Ivy League.

In their second year under head coach Timothy Murphy, the Crimson compiled a 2–8 record and were outscored 258 to 183. Justin Frantz was the team captain.

Harvard's 1–6 conference record placed eighth (and worst) in the Ivy League standings. The Crimson were outscored 199 to 112 by Ivy opponents.

Harvard played its home games at Harvard Stadium in the Allston neighborhood of Boston, Massachusetts.

== Schedule ==
Date	Opponent	Site	Result	Attendance	Source
September 16	Columbia	Harvard Stadium; Boston, MA	L 24–28	8,150	
September 23	at Colgate*	Andy Kerr Stadium; Hamilton, NY	W 28–8	3,000	
September 30	Fordham*	Harvard Stadium; Boston, MA	L 21–24	5,320	
October 7	at Cornell	Schoellkopf Field; Ithaca, NY	L 27–28	8,500	
October 14	Holy Cross*	Harvard Stadium; Boston, MA	L 22–27	7,375	
October 21	Princeton	Harvard Stadium; Boston, MA (rivalry)	L 3–14	16,420	
October 28	at Dartmouth	Memorial Field; Hanover, NH (rivalry)	L 7–23	7,830	
November 4	at Brown	Brown Stadium; Providence, RI	L 8–47		
November 11	Penn	Harvard Stadium; Boston, MA (rivalry)	L 21–38	7,622	
November 18	at Yale	Yale Bowl; New Haven, CT (The Game)	W 22–21	35,103	
*Non-conference game
