= 1995 The Citadel Bulldogs football team =

American college football season

1995 The Citadel Bulldogs football
- Conference: Southern Conference
- Record: 2–9 (0–8 SoCon)
- Head coach: Charlie Taaffe (9th season)
- Offensive scheme: Option
- Defensive coordinator: Don Powers (7th season)
- Home stadium: Johnson Hagood Stadium

1995 Southern Conference football standings
	Conf.					Overall
Team	W		L		T	W		L		T
No. 2 Appalachian State $^	8	–	0	–	0	12	–	1	–	0
No. 6 Marshall ^	7	–	1	–	0	12	–	3	–	0
No. 15 Georgia Southern ^	5	–	3	–	0	9	–	4	–	0
Furman	5	–	3	–	0	6	–	5	–	0
East Tennessee State	4	–	4	–	0	4	–	7	–	0
VMI	3	–	5	–	0	4	–	7	–	0
Chattanooga	2	–	6	–	0	4	–	7	–	0
Western Carolina	2	–	6	–	0	3	–	7	–	0
The Citadel	0	–	8	–	0	2	–	9	–	0
$ – Conference champion; ^ – NCAA Division I-AA playoff participant; Rankings from The Sports Network poll

The 1995 The Citadel Bulldogs football team represented The Citadel, The Military College of South Carolina in the 1995 NCAA Division I-AA football season. Charlie Taaffe served as head coach for the ninth season. The Bulldogs played as members of the Southern Conference and played home games at Johnson Hagood Stadium.

== Schedule ==
Date	Opponent	Site	Result	Attendance	Source
September 2	Newberry*	Johnson Hagood Stadium; Charleston, SC	W 21–20	14,134	
September 9	Wofford*	Johnson Hagood Stadium; Charleston, SC (rivalry)	W 27–10	13,848	
September 16	at No. 20 Richmond*	University of Richmond Stadium; Richmond, VA	L 13–17	10,610	
September 23	at Western Carolina	E. J. Whitmire Stadium; Cullowhee, NC	L 14–31	8,645	
October 7	at East Tennessee State	Memorial Center; Johnson City, TN	L 13–21	6,345	
October 14	Furman	Johnson Hagood Stadium; Charleston, SC (rivalry)	L 3–24	18,381	
October 21	at No. 17 Georgia Southern	Paulson Stadium; Statesboro, GA	L 0–26	14,201	
October 28	No. 7 Marshall	Johnson Hagood Stadium; Charleston, SC	L 19–21	11,833	
November 4	at Chattanooga	Chamberlain Field; Chattanooga, TN	L 24–29	5,299	
November 11	VMI^{†}	Johnson Hagood Stadium; Charleston, SC (Military Classic of the South)	L 7–34	15,757	
November 18	No. 2 Appalachian State	Johnson Hagood Stadium; Charleston, SC	L 24–28	9,256	
*Non-conference game; ^{†}Homecoming; Rankings from The Sports Network Poll released prior to the game

== NFL Draft selection ==
Year	Round	Pick	Overall	Name	Team	Position
1995	5	36	170	Travis Jervey	Green Bay Packers	Running back
