= 1995 UMass Minutemen football team =

American college football season

1995 UMass Minutemen football
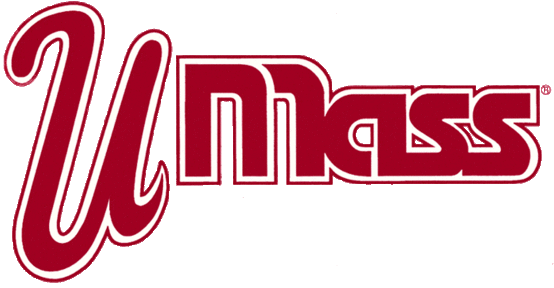
- Conference: Yankee Conference
- New England Division
- Record: 6–5 (3–5 Yankee)
- Head coach: Mike Hodges (4th season)
- Defensive coordinator: Ted Roof (1st season)
- Home stadium: Warren McGuirk Alumni Stadium

1995 Yankee Conference football standings
	Conf.					Overall
Team	W		L		T	W		L		T
New England Division
Rhode Island x	6	–	2	–	0	7	–	4	–	0
No. 23 Connecticut	5	–	3	–	0	8	–	3	–	0
New Hampshire	4	–	4	–	0	6	–	5	–	0
UMass	3	–	5	–	0	6	–	5	–	0
Boston University	1	–	7	–	0	3	–	8	–	0
Maine	1	–	7	–	0	3	–	8	–	0
Mid-Atlantic Division
No. 7 Delaware x$^	8	–	0	–	0	11	–	2	–	0
No. 13 James Madison ^	6	–	2	–	0	8	–	4	–	0
No. 19 William & Mary	5	–	3	–	0	7	–	4	–	0
No. 20 Richmond	5	–	3	–	0	7	–	3	–	1
Northeastern	2	–	6	–	0	4	–	7	–	0
Villanova	2	–	6	–	0	3	–	8	–	0
$ – Conference champion; x – Division champion/co-champions; ^ – NCAA Division I-AA playoff participant; Rankings from The Sports Network poll

The 1995 UMass Minutemen football team represented the University of Massachusetts Amherst in the 1995 NCAA Division I-AA football season as a member of the Atlantic 10 Conference. The team was coached by Mike Hodges and played its home games at Warren McGuirk Alumni Stadium in Hadley, Massachusetts. UMass finished the season with a record of 6–5 overall and 3–5 in conference play.

== Schedule ==
Date	Time	Opponent	Rank	Site	Result	Attendance	Source
September 9	1:00 p.m.	Richmond	No. 19	McGuirk Stadium; Hadley, MA	L 7–21	8,614	
September 16	1:00 p.m.	Holy Cross*		McGuirk Stadium; Hadley, MA	W 51–0	8,819	
September 23	1:00 p.m.	at Northeastern		Parsons Field; Brookline, MA	W 21–19	3,500	
September 30	1:00 p.m.	at Rhode Island		Meade Stadium; Kingston, RI	L 0–34	5,005	
October 7	1:00 p.m.	New Hampshire		McGuirk Stadium; Hadley, MA (rivalry)	L 29–32	11,191	
October 14	1:30 p.m.	at Buffalo*		University at Buffalo Stadium; Amherst, NY (rivalry)	W 33–9	5,665	
October 21	1:00 p.m.	No. 12 William & Mary		McGuirk Stadium; Hadley, MA	W 20–9	5,011	
October 28	1:00 p.m.	Lehigh*		McGuirk Stadium; Hadley, MA	W 44–36	5,871	
November 4	12:30 p.m.	at Maine		Alumni Stadium; Orono, ME	L 21–24 ^{OT}	2,139	
November 11	1:00 p.m.	at Boston University		Nickerson Field; Boston, MA	W 28–23	6,095	
November 18	1:00 p.m.	at Connecticut		Memorial Stadium; Storrs, CT (rivalry)	L 7–20	8,479	
*Non-conference game; Rankings from The Sports Network Poll released prior to the game; All times are in Eastern time
