= 1995 Cornell Big Red football team =

American college football season

1995 Cornell Big Red football
- Conference: Ivy League
- Record: 6–4 (5–2 Ivy)
- Head coach: Jim Hofher (6th season)
- Captains: Greg Bloedorn; Doug Knopp; John Vitullo
- Home stadium: Schoellkopf Field

1995 Ivy League football standings
	Conf.					Overall
Team	W		L		T	W		L		T
Princeton $	5	–	1	–	1	8	–	1	–	1
Penn	5	–	2	–	0	7	–	3	–	0
Cornell	5	–	2	–	0	6	–	4	–	0
Dartmouth	4	–	2	–	1	7	–	2	–	1
Columbia	3	–	4	–	0	3	–	6	–	1
Brown	2	–	5	–	0	5	–	5	–	0
Yale	2	–	5	–	0	3	–	7	–	0
Harvard	1	–	6	–	0	2	–	8	–	0
$ – Conference champion

The 1995 Cornell Big Red football team was an American football team that represented Cornell University during the 1995 NCAA Division I-AA football season. Cornell tied for second in the Ivy League.

In its sixth season under head coach Jim Hofher, the team compiled a 6–4 record and outscored opponents 261 to 222. Greg Bloedorn, Doug Knopp and John Vitullo were the team captains.

Cornell's 5–2 conference record tied for second in the Ivy League standings. The Big Red outscored Ivy opponents 203 to 159.

Cornell played its home games at Schoellkopf Field in Ithaca, New York.

== Schedule ==
Date	Opponent	Site	Result	Attendance	Source
September 16	at Princeton	Palmer Stadium; Princeton, NJ	L 22–24	7,039	
September 23	Holy Cross^{†}*	Schoellkopf Field; Ithaca, NY	W 28–19	11,033	
September 30	at Dartmouth	Memorial Field; Hanover, NH (rivalry)	W 24–19	8,030	
October 7	Harvard	Schoellkopf Field; Ithaca, NY	W 28–27	8,500	
October 14	Bucknell*	Schoellkopf Field; Ithaca, NY	L 7–10	4,919	
October 21	at Lehigh*	Goodman Stadium; Bethlehem, PA	L 23–24	7,553	
October 28	at Brown	Brown Stadium; Providence, RI	W 38–28	2,574	
November 4	Yale	Schoellkopf Field; Ithaca, NY	W 38–10	9,148	
November 11	Columbia	Schoellkopf Field; Ithaca, NY (rivalry)	W 35–14	5,673	
November 18	at Penn	Franklin Field; Philadelphia, PA (rivalry)	L 18–37	12,118	
*Non-conference game; ^{†}Homecoming
