= 1995 Holy Cross Crusaders football team =

American college football season

1995 Holy Cross Crusaders football
- Conference: Patriot League
- Record: 2–9 (1–4 Patriot)
- Head coach: Peter Vaas (4th season)
- Captains: Matt Faery; David Harris; Brian Regan
- Home stadium: Fitton Field

1995 Patriot League football standings
	Conf.					Overall
Team	W		L		T	W		L		T
Lehigh $	5	–	0	–	0	8	–	3	–	0
Bucknell	4	–	1	–	0	7	–	4	–	0
Lafayette	3	–	2	–	0	4	–	6	–	1
Fordham	2	–	3	–	0	4	–	6	–	1
Holy Cross	1	–	4	–	0	2	–	9	–	0
Colgate	0	–	5	–	0	0	–	11	–	0
$ – Conference champion

The 1995 Holy Cross Crusaders football team was an American football team that represented the College of the Holy Cross during the 1995 NCAA Division I-AA football season. Holy Cross finished fifth in the Patriot League.

In their fourth and final year under head coach Peter Vaas, the Crusaders compiled a 2–9 record. David Harris, Matt Faery and Brian Regan were the team captains.

The Crusaders were outscored 326 to 180. Holy Cross' 1–4 conference record placed fifth in the six-team Patriot League standings. This was the Crusaders' worst result in 10 years of league play.

Holy Cross played its home games at Fitton Field on the college campus in Worcester, Massachusetts.

== Schedule ==
Date	Opponent	Site	Result	Attendance	Source
September 9	Hofstra*	Fitton Field; Worcester, MA	L 9–24	6,614	
September 16	at UMass*	McGuirk Stadium; Hadley, MA	L 0–51	8,819	
September 23	at Cornell*	Schoellkopf Field; Ithaca, NY	L 19–28	11,033	
September 30	Brown*	Fitton Field; Worcester, MA	L 14–37	8,564	
October 7	Yale^{†}*	Fitton Field; Worcester, MA	L 17–28	4,812	
October 14	at Harvard*	Harvard Stadium; Boston, MA	W 27–22	7,375	
October 21	Lafayette^	Fitton Field; Worcester, MA	L 17–27	4,128	
October 28	vs. Fordham	Bermuda National Stadium; Devonshire Parish, Bermuda (rivalry)	L 10–17	2,436	
November 4	at Bucknell	Christy Mathewson–Memorial Stadium; Lewisburg, PA	L 7–21	8,729	
November 11	at Lehigh	Goodman Stadium; Bethlehem, PA	L 21–51	11,254	
November 18	Colgate	Fitton Field; Worcester, MA	W 39–20	6,423	
*Non-conference game; ^{†}Homecoming; ^ Family Weekend
