= 1995 Delaware Fightin' Blue Hens football team =

American college football season

1995 Delaware Fightin' Blue Hens football

Yankee Conference champion Lambert Cup winner ECAC Team of the Year

NCAA Division I-AA Quarterfinal, L 18–52 at McNeese State
- Conference: Yankee Conference
- Mid-Atlantic Division

Ranking
- Sports Network: No. 7
- Record: 11–2 (8–0 Yankee)
- Head coach: Tubby Raymond (30th season)
- Offensive coordinator: Ted Kempski (28th season)
- Offensive scheme: Delaware Wing-T
- Defensive coordinator: Bob Sabol (5th season)
- Base defense: 4–3
- Home stadium: Delaware Stadium

1995 Yankee Conference football standings
	Conf.					Overall
Team	W		L		T	W		L		T
New England Division
Rhode Island x	6	–	2	–	0	7	–	4	–	0
No. 23 Connecticut	5	–	3	–	0	8	–	3	–	0
New Hampshire	4	–	4	–	0	6	–	5	–	0
UMass	3	–	5	–	0	6	–	5	–	0
Boston University	1	–	7	–	0	3	–	8	–	0
Maine	1	–	7	–	0	3	–	8	–	0
Mid-Atlantic Division
No. 7 Delaware x$^	8	–	0	–	0	11	–	2	–	0
No. 13 James Madison ^	6	–	2	–	0	8	–	4	–	0
No. 19 William & Mary	5	–	3	–	0	7	–	4	–	0
No. 20 Richmond	5	–	3	–	0	7	–	3	–	1
Northeastern	2	–	6	–	0	4	–	7	–	0
Villanova	2	–	6	–	0	3	–	8	–	0
$ – Conference champion; x – Division champion/co-champions; ^ – NCAA Division I-AA playoff participant; Rankings from The Sports Network poll

The 1995 Delaware Fightin' Blue Hens football team represented the University of Delaware as a member of the Mid-Atlantic Division of the Yankee Conference during the 1995 NCAA Division I-AA football season. Led by 30th-year head coach Tubby Raymond, the Fightin' Blue Hens compiled an overall record of 11–2 with a mark of 8–0 in conference play, winning the Yankee Conference title. Delaware advanced to the NCAA Division I-AA Football Championship playoffs, where the Fightin' Blue Hens beat Hofstra in the first round before for losing to McNeese State in the quarterfinals. The team played home games at Delaware Stadium in Newark, Delaware.

== Schedule ==
Date	Opponent	Rank	Site	Result	Attendance	Source
September 9	West Chester*	No. 12	Delaware Stadium; Newark, DE (rivalry)	W 49–21	16,544	
September 16	Villanova	No. 11	Delaware Stadium; Newark, DE (Battle of the Blue)	W 28–7	15,534	
September 23	at No. 15 Boston University	No. 11	Nickerson Field; Boston, MA	W 41–29	4,697	
September 30	at Northeastern	No. 10	Parsons Field; Brookline, MA	W 37–10	4,100	
October 7	Youngstown State*	No. 9	Delaware Stadium; Newark, DE	W 34–13	16,459	
October 14	No. 12 Richmond^{†}	No. 8	Delaware Stadium; Newark, DE	W 15–0	18,926	
October 21	at No. 10 James Madison	No. 7	Bridgeforth Stadium; Harrisonburg, VA (rivalry)	W 48–19	13,500	
October 28	Maine	No. 5	Delaware Stadium; Newark, DE	W 61–0	22,293	
November 4	No. 18 William & Mary	No. 4	Delaware Stadium; Newark, DE (rivalry)	W 23–20	17,317	
November 11	at Navy*	No. 4	Navy–Marine Corps Memorial Stadium; Annapolis, MD	L 7–31	30,159	
November 18	at Rhode Island	No. 8	Meade Stadium; Kingston, RI	W 24–19	7,890	
November 25	No. 9 Hofstra*	No. 7	Delaware Stadium; Newark, DE (NCAA Division I-AA First Round)	W 38–17	13,295	
December 2	at No. 1 McNeese State*	No. 7	Cowboy Stadium; Lake Charles, LA (NCAA Division I-AA Quarterfinal)	L 18–52	17,239	
*Non-conference game; ^{†}Homecoming; Rankings from The Sports Network Poll released prior to the game

== Roster ==
1995 Delaware Fightin' Blue Hens football team roster
Players
Coaches
Offense

Pos.	#	Name	Class
QB	9	Leo Hamlett	Jr
WR	15	Jason Phillips	Fr

Defense

Pos.	#	Name	Class

Special teams

Pos.	#	Name	Class

Head coach

- Tubby Raymond

Coordinators/assistant coaches

Legend

- (C) Team captain
- (S) Suspended
- (I) Ineligible
- Injured
- Redshirt

Roster
