= 1995 Bucknell Bison football team =

American college football season

1995 Bucknell Bison football
- Conference: Patriot League
- Record: 7–4 (4–1 Patriot)
- Head coach: Tom Gadd (1st season)
- Captains: Rob Bird; Brian Gay; John Sakowski
- Home stadium: Christy Mathewson–Memorial Stadium

1995 Patriot League football standings
	Conf.					Overall
Team	W		L		T	W		L		T
Lehigh $	5	–	0	–	0	8	–	3	–	0
Bucknell	4	–	1	–	0	7	–	4	–	0
Lafayette	3	–	2	–	0	4	–	6	–	1
Fordham	2	–	3	–	0	4	–	6	–	1
Holy Cross	1	–	4	–	0	2	–	9	–	0
Colgate	0	–	5	–	0	0	–	11	–	0
$ – Conference champion

The 1995 Bucknell Bison football team was an American football team that represented Bucknell University during the 1995 NCAA Division I-AA football season. It finished second in the Patriot League.

Bucknell played its home games at Christy Mathewson–Memorial Stadium on the university campus in Lewisburg, Pennsylvania.

In its first year under head coach Tom Gadd, the Bison compiled a 7–4 record. Rob Bird, Brian Gay and John Sakowski were the team captains.

The Bison outscored opponents 195 to 174. Bucknell's 4–1 conference record placed second in the six-team Patriot League standings.

== Schedule ==
Date	Opponent	Site	Result	Attendance	Source
September 9	Southern Connecticut*	Christy Mathewson–Memorial Stadium; Lewisburg, PA	W 20–0		
September 16	at Fordham	Coffey Field; Bronx, NY	W 28–21		
September 23	at Princeton*	Palmer Stadium; Princeton, NJ	L 3–20	6,910	
September 30	at No. 14 Penn*	Franklin Field; Philadelphia, PA	L 19–20	10,203	
October 7	Lehigh^{†}	Christy Mathewson–Memorial Stadium; Lewisburg, PA	L 23–30	8,418	
October 14	at Cornell*	Schoellkopf Field; Ithaca, NY	W 10–7	4,919	
October 21	at Towson State*	Minnegan Stadium; Towson, MD	W 14–7	1,026	
October 28	Lafayette	Christy Mathewson–Memorial Stadium; Lewisburg, PA	W 30–11	5,061	
November 4	Holy Cross^	Christy Mathewson–Memorial Stadium; Lewisburg, PA	W 21–7	8,729	
November 11	at Colgate	Andy Kerr Stadium; Hamilton, NY	W 21–14 ^{OT}	1,000	
November 18	at Army*	Michie Stadium; West Point, NY	L 6–37	30,023	
*Non-conference game; ^{†}Homecoming; ^ Parents Weekend; Rankings from The Sports Network Poll released prior to the game
