= 1995 Appalachian State Mountaineers football team =

American college football season

1995 Appalachian State Mountaineers football

SoCon champion

NCAA Division I-AA Quarterfinal, L 17–27 vs. Stephen F. Austin
- Conference: Southern Conference

Ranking
- Sports Network: No. 2
- Record: 12–1 (8–0 SoCon)
- Head coach: Jerry Moore (7th season)
- Home stadium: Kidd Brewer Stadium

1995 Southern Conference football standings
	Conf.					Overall
Team	W		L		T	W		L		T
No. 2 Appalachian State $^	8	–	0	–	0	12	–	1	–	0
No. 6 Marshall ^	7	–	1	–	0	12	–	3	–	0
No. 15 Georgia Southern ^	5	–	3	–	0	9	–	4	–	0
Furman	5	–	3	–	0	6	–	5	–	0
East Tennessee State	4	–	4	–	0	4	–	7	–	0
VMI	3	–	5	–	0	4	–	7	–	0
Chattanooga	2	–	6	–	0	4	–	7	–	0
Western Carolina	2	–	6	–	0	3	–	7	–	0
The Citadel	0	–	8	–	0	2	–	9	–	0
$ – Conference champion; ^ – NCAA Division I-AA playoff participant; Rankings from The Sports Network poll

The 1995 Appalachian State Mountaineers football team was an American football team that represented Appalachian State University as a member of the Southern Conference (SoCon) during the 1995 NCAA Division I-AA football season. In their seventh year under head coach Jerry Moore, the Mountaineers compiled an overall record of 12–1, with a conference mark of 8–0, and finished as SoCon champion. Appalachian State advanced to the NCAA Division I-AA Football Championship playoffs, where they defeated James Madison in the first round and were upset by Stephen F. Austin in the quarterfinals.

== Schedule ==
Date	Opponent	Rank	Site	Result	Attendance	Source
August 31	at Wake Forest*	No. 6	Groves Stadium; Winston-Salem, NC	W 24–22	21,831	
September 9	Edinboro*	No. 2	Kidd Brewer Stadium; Boone, NC	W 44–7	15,123	
September 16	at North Carolina A&T*	No. 2	Aggie Stadium; Greensboro, NC	W 38–31	10,001	
September 30	East Tennessee State	No. 2	Kidd Brewer Stadium; Boone, NC	W 30–23	16,627	
October 7	at Furman	No. 2	Paladin Stadium; Greenville, SC	W 41–28	11,245	
October 14	No. 13 Georgia Southern	No. 2	Kidd Brewer Stadium; Boone, NC (rivalry)	W 27–17	8,797	
October 21	at No. 3 Marshall	No. 2	Marshall University Stadium; Huntington, WV (rivalry)	W 10–3	26,982	
October 28	Chattanooga	No. 2	Kidd Brewer Stadium; Boone, NC	W 31–18	18,327	
November 4	at VMI	No. 2	Alumni Memorial Field; Lexington, VA	W 26–24	6,207	
November 11	Western Carolina	No. 2	Kidd Brewer Stadium; Boone, NC (rivalry)	W 28–3	10,927	
November 18	at The Citadel	No. 2	Johnson Hagood Stadium; Charleston, SC	W 28–24	9,256	
November 25	No. 13 James Madison*	No. 2	Kidd Brewer Stadium; Boone, NC (NCAA Division I-AA First Round)	W 31–24	9,467	
December 2	No. 5 Stephen F. Austin*	No. 2	Kidd Brewer Stadium; Boone, NC (NCAA Division I-AA Quarterfinal)	L 17–27	8,941	
*Non-conference game; Rankings from The Sports Network Poll released prior to the game
