= 1995 Connecticut Huskies football team =

American college football season

1995 Connecticut Huskies football
- Conference: Yankee Conference
- New England Division

Ranking
- Sports Network: No. 23
- Record: 8–3 (5–3 Yankee)
- Head coach: Skip Holtz (2nd season)
- Defensive coordinator: Nick Rapone (1st season)
- Home stadium: Memorial Stadium

1995 Yankee Conference football standings
| | Conf. | | | | | Overall |
| Team | W | | L | | T | W | | L | | T |
|---|---|---|---|---|---|---|---|---|---|---|
New England Division
| Rhode Island x | 6 | – | 2 | – | 0 | 7 | – | 4 | – | 0 |
| No. 23 Connecticut | 5 | – | 3 | – | 0 | 8 | – | 3 | – | 0 |
| New Hampshire | 4 | – | 4 | – | 0 | 6 | – | 5 | – | 0 |
| UMass | 3 | – | 5 | – | 0 | 6 | – | 5 | – | 0 |
| Boston University | 1 | – | 7 | – | 0 | 3 | – | 8 | – | 0 |
| Maine | 1 | – | 7 | – | 0 | 3 | – | 8 | – | 0 |
Mid-Atlantic Division
| No. 7 Delaware x$^ | 8 | – | 0 | – | 0 | 11 | – | 2 | – | 0 |
| No. 13 James Madison ^ | 6 | – | 2 | – | 0 | 8 | – | 4 | – | 0 |
| No. 19 William & Mary | 5 | – | 3 | – | 0 | 7 | – | 4 | – | 0 |
| No. 20 Richmond | 5 | – | 3 | – | 0 | 7 | – | 3 | – | 1 |
| Northeastern | 2 | – | 6 | – | 0 | 4 | – | 7 | – | 0 |
| Villanova | 2 | – | 6 | – | 0 | 3 | – | 8 | – | 0 |
$ – Conference champion; x – Division champion/co-champions; ^ – NCAA Division I-AA playoff participant; Rankings from The Sports Network poll

The 1995 Connecticut Huskies football team represented the University of Connecticut in the 1995 NCAA Division I-AA football season. The Huskies were led by second-year head coach Skip Holtz, and completed the season with a record of 8–3.

== Schedule ==
| Date | Opponent | Rank | Site | Result | Attendance | Source |
|---|---|---|---|---|---|---|
| September 9 | No. 18 New Hampshire | | Memorial Stadium; Storrs, CT | W 23–21 | 11,711 | |
| September 16 | Central Connecticut State* | | Memorial Stadium; Storrs, CT | W 54–9 | 11,322 | |
| September 23 | Buffalo* | | Memorial Stadium; Storrs, CT | W 26–25 | 15,518 | |
| September 30 | at Yale* | | Yale Bowl; New Haven, CT | W 39–20 | 20,861 | |
| October 7 | at Villanova | | Villanova Stadium; Villanova, PA | W 14–13 | 6,727 | |
| October 14 | at Maine | No. 20 | Alumni Field; Orono, ME | W 31–30 | 8,007 | |
| October 21 | at Rhode Island | No. 15 | Meade Stadium; Kingston, RI (rivalry) | L 19–24 | 7,237 | |
| October 28 | Northeastern | No. 21 | Memorial Stadium; Storrs, CT | L 9–10 | | |
| November 4 | Boston University | No. 25 | Memorial Stadium; Storrs, CT | W 28–17 | | |
| November 11 | at No. 18 James Madison | No. 24 | Bridgeforth Stadium; Harrisonburg, VA | L 16–24 | 8,000 | |
| November 18 | UMass | | Memorial Stadium; Storrs, CT (rivalry) | W 20–7 | 8,479 | |
*Non-conference game; Rankings from The Sports Network Poll released prior to the game
