= 1995 Furman Paladins football team =

American college football season

1995 Furman Paladins football
- Conference: Southern Conference
- Record: 6–5 (5–3 SoCon)
- Head coach: Bobby Johnson (2nd season)
- Captains: Leonardo McClarty; Tommy Jones; Brandon Culpepper; Philly Jones; Marcus Morgan; Brian Fisher; Adrick Harrison; Jim Richter
- Home stadium: Paladin Stadium

1995 Southern Conference football standings
	Conf.					Overall
Team	W		L		T	W		L		T
No. 2 Appalachian State $^	8	–	0	–	0	12	–	1	–	0
No. 6 Marshall ^	7	–	1	–	0	12	–	3	–	0
No. 15 Georgia Southern ^	5	–	3	–	0	9	–	4	–	0
Furman	5	–	3	–	0	6	–	5	–	0
East Tennessee State	4	–	4	–	0	4	–	7	–	0
VMI	3	–	5	–	0	4	–	7	–	0
Chattanooga	2	–	6	–	0	4	–	7	–	0
Western Carolina	2	–	6	–	0	3	–	7	–	0
The Citadel	0	–	8	–	0	2	–	9	–	0
$ – Conference champion; ^ – NCAA Division I-AA playoff participant; Rankings from The Sports Network poll

The 1995 Furman Paladins football team was an American football team that represented Furman University as a member of the Southern Conference (SoCon) during the 1995 NCAA Division I-AA football season. In their second year under head coach Bobby Johnson, the Paladins compiled an overall record of 6–5, with a mark of 5–3 in conference play, finishing tied for third in the SoCon.

== Schedule ==
Date	Opponent	Site	Result	Attendance	Source
September 2	at Georgia Tech*	Bobby Dodd Stadium; Atlanta, GA	L 7–51	38,511	
September 9	at South Carolina State*	Oliver C. Dawson Stadium; Orangeburg, SC	L 21–27		
September 16	Wofford*	Paladin Stadium; Greenville, SC (rivalry)	W 38–0		
September 23	VMI	Paladin Stadium; Greenville, SC	W 55–24	8,994	
September 30	at Western Carolina	Whitmire Stadium; Cullowhee, NC	W 31–21		
October 7	No. 2 Appalachian State	Paladin Stadium; Greenville, SC	L 28–41	11,245	
October 14	at The Citadel	Johnson Hagood Stadium; Charleston, SC (rivalry)	W 24–3	18,381	
October 21	East Tennessee State	Paladin Stadium; Greenville, SC	W 21–15		
November 4	at No. 22 Georgia Southern	Paulson Stadium; Statesboro, GA	L 20–27	15,305	
November 11	No. 7 Marshall	Paladin Stadium; Greenville, SC	L 6–31	10,688	
November 18	at Chattanooga	Chamberlain Field; Chattanooga, TN	W 23–21	5,458	
*Non-conference game; Rankings from The Sports Network Poll released prior to the game
