= 1995 Chattanooga Moccasins football team =

American college football season

1995 Chattanooga Moccasins football
- Conference: Southern Conference
- Record: 4–7 (2–6 SoCon)
- Head coach: Buddy Green (2nd season)
- Co-offensive coordinator: Shane Montgomery (1st season)
- Defensive coordinator: Rick Whitt (2nd season)
- Captains: Jeff Peters; Tobe Taylor; Josh Siefken
- Home stadium: Chamberlain Field

1995 Southern Conference football standings
	Conf.					Overall
Team	W		L		T	W		L		T
No. 2 Appalachian State $^	8	–	0	–	0	12	–	1	–	0
No. 6 Marshall ^	7	–	1	–	0	12	–	3	–	0
No. 15 Georgia Southern ^	5	–	3	–	0	9	–	4	–	0
Furman	5	–	3	–	0	6	–	5	–	0
East Tennessee State	4	–	4	–	0	4	–	7	–	0
VMI	3	–	5	–	0	4	–	7	–	0
Chattanooga	2	–	6	–	0	4	–	7	–	0
Western Carolina	2	–	6	–	0	3	–	7	–	0
The Citadel	0	–	8	–	0	2	–	9	–	0
$ – Conference champion; ^ – NCAA Division I-AA playoff participant; Rankings from The Sports Network poll

The 1995 Chattanooga Moccasins football team represented the University of Tennessee at Chattanooga as a member of the Southern Conference (SoCon) in the 1995 NCAA Division I-AA football season. The Moccasins were led by second-year head coach Buddy Green and played their home games at Chamberlain Field. They finished the season 4–7 overall and 2–6 in SoCon play to tie for seventh place.

== Schedule ==
Date	Opponent	Site	Result	Attendance	Source
September 2	Charleston Southern*	Chamberlain Field; Chattanooga, TN	W 41–0	3,746	
September 11	at No. 6 (I-A) Auburn*	Jordan-Hare Stadium; Auburn, AL	L 10–76	81,570	
September 16	Bethune–Cookman*	Chamberlain Field; Chattanooga, TN	W 35–6	7,009	
September 23	at No. 18 Georgia Southern	Paulson Stadium; Statesboro, GA	L 9–35	13,503	
September 30	No. 3 Marshall^{†}	Chamberlain Field; Chattanooga, TN	L 32–35	8,576	
October 14	at VMI	Alumni Memorial Field; Lexington, VA	L 12–17	6,927	
October 21	Western Carolina	Chamberlain Field; Chattanooga, TN	W 35–14	7,088	
October 28	at No. 2 Appalachian State	Kidd Brewer Stadium; Boone, NC	L 18–31	18,327	
November 4	The Citadel	Chamberlain Field; Chattanooga, TN	W 29–24	5,299	
November 11	at East Tennessee State	Memorial Center; Johnson City, TN	L 9–38	6,957	
November 18	Furman	Chamberlain Field; Chattanooga, TN	L 21–23	5,458	
*Non-conference game; ^{†}Homecoming; Rankings from The Sports Network Poll released prior to the game
