= 1995 Villanova Wildcats football team =

American college football season

1995 Villanova Wildcats football
- Conference: Yankee Conference
- Record: 3–8 (2–6 Yankee)
- Head coach: Andy Talley (11th season)
- Defensive coordinator: Dan MacNeill (8th season)
- Home stadium: Villanova Stadium

1995 Yankee Conference football standings
	Conf.					Overall
Team	W		L		T	W		L		T
New England Division
Rhode Island x	6	–	2	–	0	7	–	4	–	0
No. 23 Connecticut	5	–	3	–	0	8	–	3	–	0
New Hampshire	4	–	4	–	0	6	–	5	–	0
UMass	3	–	5	–	0	6	–	5	–	0
Boston University	1	–	7	–	0	3	–	8	–	0
Maine	1	–	7	–	0	3	–	8	–	0
Mid-Atlantic Division
No. 7 Delaware x$^	8	–	0	–	0	11	–	2	–	0
No. 13 James Madison ^	6	–	2	–	0	8	–	4	–	0
No. 19 William & Mary	5	–	3	–	0	7	–	4	–	0
No. 20 Richmond	5	–	3	–	0	7	–	3	–	1
Northeastern	2	–	6	–	0	4	–	7	–	0
Villanova	2	–	6	–	0	3	–	8	–	0
$ – Conference champion; x – Division champion/co-champions; ^ – NCAA Division I-AA playoff participant; Rankings from The Sports Network poll

The 1995 Villanova Wildcats football team was an American football team that represented the Villanova University as a member of the Yankee Conference during the 1995 NCAA Division I-AA football season. In their 11th year under head coach Andy Talley, the team compiled a 3–8 record.

== Schedule ==
Date	Opponent	Site	Result	Attendance	Source
September 8	No. 22 Boston University	Villanova Stadium; Villanova, PA	L 16–21	6,327	
September 16	at No. 11 Delaware	Delaware Stadium; Newark, DE (rivalry)	L 7–28	15,534	
September 23	No. 8 James Madison	Villanova Stadium; Villanova, PA	L 27–28 ^{OT}	11,368	
September 30	at Buffalo*	University at Buffalo Stadium; Amherst, NY	W 28–3	6,759	
October 7	Connecticut	Villanova Stadium; Villanova, PA	L 13–14	6,727	
October 14	Northeastern	Villanova Stadium; Villanova, PA	W 27–24	2,721	
October 21	at Navy*	Navy–Marine Corps Memorial Stadium; Annapolis, MD	L 14–20	26,726	
October 28	at No. 20 William & Mary	Zable Stadium; Williamsburg, VA	L 15–18	13,925	
November 4	at No. 23 Rhode Island	Meade Stadium; Kingston, RI	L 10–27	8,044	
November 11	New Hampshire	Villanova Stadium; Villanova, PA	L 9–12	5,722	
November 18	No. 18 Richmond	Villanova Stadium; Villanova, PA	W 28–0	3,444	
*Non-conference game; Rankings from The Sports Network Poll released prior to the game

== Roster ==
1995 Villanova Wildcats football team roster
Players
Coaches
Offense

Pos.	#	Name	Class
WR	29	Brad Finneran	So
WR	25	Brian Finneran	So
QB	3	Tom Marchese	Sr

Defense

Pos.	#	Name	Class
CB	1	Deon Jackson	Jr

Special teams

Pos.	#	Name	Class

Head coach

- Andy Talley

Coordinators/assistant coaches

Legend

- (C) Team captain
- (S) Suspended
- (I) Ineligible
- Injured
- Redshirt
