= 1995 Richmond Spiders football team =

American college football season

1995 Richmond Spiders football
- Conference: Yankee Conference
- Record: 7–3–1 (5–3 Yankee)
- Head coach: Jim Reid (1st season)
- Defensive coordinator: John Zamberlin (1st season)
- Home stadium: UR Stadium

1995 Yankee Conference football standings
	Conf.					Overall
Team	W		L		T	W		L		T
New England Division
Rhode Island x	6	–	2	–	0	7	–	4	–	0
No. 23 Connecticut	5	–	3	–	0	8	–	3	–	0
New Hampshire	4	–	4	–	0	6	–	5	–	0
UMass	3	–	5	–	0	6	–	5	–	0
Boston University	1	–	7	–	0	3	–	8	–	0
Maine	1	–	7	–	0	3	–	8	–	0
Mid-Atlantic Division
No. 7 Delaware x$^	8	–	0	–	0	11	–	2	–	0
No. 13 James Madison ^	6	–	2	–	0	8	–	4	–	0
No. 19 William & Mary	5	–	3	–	0	7	–	4	–	0
No. 20 Richmond	5	–	3	–	0	7	–	3	–	1
Northeastern	2	–	6	–	0	4	–	7	–	0
Villanova	2	–	6	–	0	3	–	8	–	0
$ – Conference champion; x – Division champion/co-champions; ^ – NCAA Division I-AA playoff participant; Rankings from The Sports Network poll

The 1995 Richmond Spiders football team was an American football team that represented the University of Richmond as a member of the Yankee Conference during the 1995 NCAA Division I-AA football season. In their first season under head coach Jim Reid, Richmond compiled a 7–3–1 record, with a mark of 5–3 in conference play, finishing tied for third place in the Mid-Atlantic division of the Yankee.

== Schedule ==
Date	Opponent	Rank	Site	Result	Attendance	Source
September 2	VMI*		UR Stadium; Richmond, VA (rivalry)	W 51–28	13,142	
September 9	at No. 19 UMass		McGuirk Stadium; Hadley, MA	W 21–7	8,614	
September 16	The Citadel*	No. 20	UR Stadium; Richmond, VA	W 17–13	10,610	
September 30	No. 21 Boston University	No. 16	UR Stadium; Richmond, VA	W 6–21	11,891	
October 7	Northeastern	No. 12	UR Stadium; Richmond, VA	W 26–23 ^{2OT}	9,227	
October 14	at No. 8 Delaware	No. 12	Delaware Stadium; Newark, DE	L 0–15	18,926	
October 21	at Fordham*	No. 16	Coffey Field; Bronx, NY	T 3–3	516	
October 28	at No. 15 James Madison	No. 16	Bridgeforth Stadium; Harrisonburg, VA	W 34–33	11,000	
November 4	New Hampshire	No. 16	UR Stadium; Richmond, VA	W 7–3	15,789	
November 11	at No. 25 William & Mary	No. 13	Zable Stadium; Williamsburg, VA (rivalry)	L 7–27	12,779	
November 18	at Villanova	No. 18	Villanova Stadium; Villanova, PA	L 0–28	3,444	
*Non-conference game; Rankings from The Sports Network Poll released prior to the game
