= 1995 James Madison Dukes football team =

American college football season

1995 James Madison Dukes football

NCAA Division I-AA First Round, L 24–31 at Appalachian State
- Conference: Yankee Conference
- Mid-Atlantic Division

Ranking
- Sports Network: No. 13
- Record: 8–4 (6–2 Yankee)
- Head coach: Alex Wood (1st season)
- Offensive coordinator: Kent Schoolfield (1st season)
- Defensive coordinator: Tim Pendergast (1st season)
- Home stadium: Bridgeforth Stadium

1995 Yankee Conference football standings
	Conf.					Overall
Team	W		L		T	W		L		T
New England Division
Rhode Island x	6	–	2	–	0	7	–	4	–	0
No. 23 Connecticut	5	–	3	–	0	8	–	3	–	0
New Hampshire	4	–	4	–	0	6	–	5	–	0
UMass	3	–	5	–	0	6	–	5	–	0
Boston University	1	–	7	–	0	3	–	8	–	0
Maine	1	–	7	–	0	3	–	8	–	0
Mid-Atlantic Division
No. 7 Delaware x$^	8	–	0	–	0	11	–	2	–	0
No. 13 James Madison ^	6	–	2	–	0	8	–	4	–	0
No. 19 William & Mary	5	–	3	–	0	7	–	4	–	0
No. 20 Richmond	5	–	3	–	0	7	–	3	–	1
Northeastern	2	–	6	–	0	4	–	7	–	0
Villanova	2	–	6	–	0	3	–	8	–	0
$ – Conference champion; x – Division champion/co-champions; ^ – NCAA Division I-AA playoff participant; Rankings from The Sports Network poll

The 1995 James Madison Dukes football team was an American football team that represented James Madison University as a member of the Mid-Atlantic Division of the Yankee Conference during the 1995 NCAA Division I-AA football season. Led by first-year head coach Alex Wood, the team compiled an overall record of 8–4 with a mark of 6–2 in conference play, and finished second in the Mid-Atlantic Division. The Dukes advanced to the NCAA Division I-AA playoffs and were defeated by Appalachian State.

== Schedule ==
Date	Opponent	Rank	Site	Result	Attendance	Source
September 2	Morgan State*	No. 7	Bridgeforth Stadium; Harrisonburg, VA	W 76–7	12,500	
September 9	at No. 16 William & Mary	No. 7	Zable Stadium; Williamsburg, VA (rivalry)	W 24–17	13,871	
September 16	No. 1 McNeese State	No. 6	Bridgeforth Stadium; Harrisonburg, VA	L 24–30	11,000	
September 23	at Villanova	No. 8	Villanova Stadium; Villanova, PA	W 28–27 ^{OT}	11,368	
September 30	at Maine	No. 7	Alumni Field; Orono, ME	W 21–17	5,930	
October 7	Boston University	No. 7	Bridgeforth Stadium; Harrisonburg, VA	W 38–31	17,000	
October 14	at New Hampshire	No. 7	Cowell Stadium; Durham, NH	W 23–19	9,150	
October 21	No. 7 Delaware	No. 10	Bridgeforth Stadium; Harrisonburg, VA (rivalry)	L 19–48	13,500	
October 28	No. 16 Richmond	No. 15	Bridgeforth Stadium; Harrisonburg, VA (rivalry)	L 33–34	11,000	
November 4	at Northeastern	No. 21	Parsons Field; Brookline, MA	W 27–13	5,800	
November 11	No. 24 Connecticut	No. 18	Bridgeforth Stadium; Harrisonburg, VA	W 24–16	8,000	
November 25	at No. 2 Appalachian State	No. 13	Kidd Brewer Stadium; Boone, NC (NCAA Division I-AA First Round)	L 24–31	9,467	
*Non-conference game; Rankings from The Sports Network Poll released prior to the game
