= 1995 Dartmouth Big Green football team =

American college football season

1995 Dartmouth Big Green football
- Conference: Ivy League
- Record: 7–2–1 (4–2–1 Ivy)
- Head coach: John Lyons (4th season)
- Offensive coordinator: Roger Hughes (4th season)
- Captains: Taran Lent; Peter Oberle
- Home stadium: Memorial Field

1995 Ivy League football standings
| | Conf. | | | | | Overall |
| Team | W | | L | | T | W | | L | | T |
|---|---|---|---|---|---|---|---|---|---|---|
| Princeton $ | 5 | – | 1 | – | 1 | 8 | – | 1 | – | 1 |
| Penn | 5 | – | 2 | – | 0 | 7 | – | 3 | – | 0 |
| Cornell | 5 | – | 2 | – | 0 | 6 | – | 4 | – | 0 |
| Dartmouth | 4 | – | 2 | – | 1 | 7 | – | 2 | – | 1 |
| Columbia | 3 | – | 4 | – | 0 | 3 | – | 6 | – | 1 |
| Brown | 2 | – | 5 | – | 0 | 5 | – | 5 | – | 0 |
| Yale | 2 | – | 5 | – | 0 | 3 | – | 7 | – | 0 |
| Harvard | 1 | – | 6 | – | 0 | 2 | – | 8 | – | 0 |
$ – Conference champion

The 1995 Dartmouth Big Green football team was an American football team that represented Dartmouth College during the 1995 NCAA Division I-AA football season. Dartmouth finished fourth in the Ivy League.

In their fourth season under head coach John Lyons, the Big Green compiled a 7–2–1 record and outscored opponents 221 to 137. Taran Lent and Peter Oberle were the team captains.

The Big Green's 4–2–1 conference record placed fourth in the Ivy League standings. Dartmouth outscored Ivy opponents 139 to 102.

Dartmouth played its home games at Memorial Field on the college campus in Hanover, New Hampshire.

== Schedule ==
| Date | Opponent | Site | Result | Attendance | Source |
|---|---|---|---|---|---|
| September 16 | at No. 17 Penn | Franklin Field; Philadelphia, PA | L 12–20 | 12,511 | |
| September 23 | at Fordham* | Coffey Field; Bronx, NY | W 34–14 | 5,311 | |
| September 30 | Cornell | Memorial Field; Hanover, NH (rivalry) | L 19–24 | 8,030 | |
| October 7 | Lafayette* | Memorial Field; Hanover, NH | W 14–7 | 3,108 | |
| October 14 | at Yale | Yale Bowl; New Haven, CT | W 22–7 | 14,729 | |
| October 21 | Colgate* | Memorial Field; Hanover, NH | W 35–14 | 6,021 | |
| October 28 | at Harvard | Harvard Stadium; Boston, MA (rivalry) | W 23–7 | 7,830 | |
| November 4 | at Columbia | Wien Stadium; New York, NY | W 43–27 | 5,780 | |
| November 11 | Brown | Memorial Field; Hanover, NH | W 10–7 | 4,711 | |
| November 18 | Princeton | Memorial Field; Hanover, NH | T 10–10 | 7,118 | |
*Non-conference game; Rankings from The Sports Network Poll released prior to the game
