= 1995 Western Carolina Catamounts football team =

American college football season

1995 Western Carolina Catamounts football
- Conference: Southern Conference
- Record: 3–7 (2–6 SoCon)
- Head coach: Steve Hodgin (6th season)
- Home stadium: E. J. Whitmire Stadium

1995 Southern Conference football standings
	Conf.					Overall
Team	W		L		T	W		L		T
No. 2 Appalachian State $^	8	–	0	–	0	12	–	1	–	0
No. 6 Marshall ^	7	–	1	–	0	12	–	3	–	0
No. 15 Georgia Southern ^	5	–	3	–	0	9	–	4	–	0
Furman	5	–	3	–	0	6	–	5	–	0
East Tennessee State	4	–	4	–	0	4	–	7	–	0
VMI	3	–	5	–	0	4	–	7	–	0
Chattanooga	2	–	6	–	0	4	–	7	–	0
Western Carolina	2	–	6	–	0	3	–	7	–	0
The Citadel	0	–	8	–	0	2	–	9	–	0
$ – Conference champion; ^ – NCAA Division I-AA playoff participant; Rankings from The Sports Network poll

The 1995 Western Carolina Catamounts team was an American football team that represented Western Carolina University as a member of the Southern Conference (SoCon) during the 1995 NCAA Division I-AA football season. In their sixth year under head coach Steve Hodgin, the team compiled an overall record of 3–7, with a mark of 2–6 in conference play, and finished tied for seventh in the SoCon.

== Schedule ==
Date	Opponent	Site	Result	Attendance	Source
September 2	at Clemson*	Memorial Stadium; Clemson, SC	L 9–55	62,714	
September 16	Elon*	E. J. Whitmire Stadium; Cullowhee, NC	W 36–14	6,632	
September 23	The Citadel	E. J. Whitmire Stadium; Cullowhee, NC	W 14–31	8,645	
September 30	Furman	E. J. Whitmire Stadium; Cullowhee, NC	L 21–31		
October 7	at No. 14 Georgia Southern	Paulson Stadium; Statesboro, GA	L 0–42	11,430	
October 14	No. 3 Marshall	E. J. Whitmire Stadium; Cullowhee, NC	L 3–42	3,858	
October 21	at Chattanooga	Chamberlain Field; Chattanooga, TN	L 14–35	7,088	
October 28	VMI	E. J. Whitmire Stadium; Cullowhee, NC	W 31–14	8,878	
November 11	at No. 2 Appalachian State	Kidd Brewer Stadium; Boone, NC (rivalry)	L 3–28	10,927	
November 18	at East Tennessee State	Memorial Center; Johnson City, TN	L 10–36		
*Non-conference game; Rankings from The Sports Network Poll released prior to the game
