= 1995 Howard Bison football team =

American college football season

1995 Howard Bison football
- Conference: Mid-Eastern Athletic Conference
- Record: 6–5 (2–4 MEAC)
- Head coach: Steve Wilson (7th season)
- Home stadium: William H. Greene Stadium; RFK Stadium

1995 Mid-Eastern Athletic Conference football standings
	Conf.					Overall
Team	W		L		T	W		L		T
No. 16 Florida A&M $	6	–	0	–	0	9	–	3	–	0
Delaware State	5	–	1	–	0	6	–	5	–	0
South Carolina State	4	–	2	–	0	6	–	4	–	0
Howard	2	–	4	–	0	6	–	5	–	0
North Carolina A&T	2	–	4	–	0	4	–	7	–	0
Bethune–Cookman	2	–	4	–	0	3	–	8	–	0
Morgan State	0	–	6	–	0	1	–	10	–	0
$ – Conference champion; Rankings from The Sports Network poll

The 1995 Howard Bison football team represented Howard University as a member of the Mid-Eastern Athletic Conference (MEAC) during the 1995 NCAA Division I-AA football season. Led by sixth-year head coach Steve Wilson, the Bison compiled an overall record of 6–5, with a conference record of 2–4, and finished tied for fourth in the MEAC.

== Schedule ==
Date	Opponent	Site	Result	Attendance	Source
September 2	vs. Bethune–Cookman	Lockhart Stadium; Fort Lauderdale, FL (South Florida Football Classic)	L 15–25	8,500	
September 8	Hampton*	RFK Stadium; Washington, DC (rivalry)	W 34–22	25,512	
November 16	North Carolina Central*	William H. Greene Stadium; Washington, DC	L 32–37	8,850	
September 23	vs. Arkansas–Pine Bluff*	Busch Memorial Stadium; St. Louis, MO (Gateway Classic)	W 23–7	24,467	
September 30	No. 23 Florida A&M	William H. Greene Stadium; Washington, DC	L 18–29	13,567	
October 7	vs. Alcorn State*	RCA Dome; Indianapolis, IN (Circle City Classic)	W 21–17	58,438	
October 21	at North Carolina A&T	Aggie Stadium; Greensboro, NC	W 20–14	11,211	
October 28	Morehouse*	RFK Stadium; Washington, DC	W 27–19	11,183	
November 4	South Carolina State	William H. Greene Stadium; Washington, DC	L 14–18	10,562	
November 11	at Morgan State	Hughes Stadium; Baltimore, MD (rivalry)	W 29–17	2,939	
November 18	at Delaware State	Alumni Stadium; Dover, DE	L 13–20		
*Non-conference game; Rankings from The Sports Network Poll released prior to the game
