= 1995 Princeton Tigers football team =

American college football season

1995 Princeton Tigers football

Ivy League champion
- Conference: Ivy League
- Record: 8–1–1 (5–1–1 Ivy)
- Head coach: Steve Tosches (9th season)
- Captain: Dave Patterson
- Home stadium: Palmer Stadium

1995 Ivy League football standings
	Conf.					Overall
Team	W		L		T	W		L		T
Princeton $	5	–	1	–	1	8	–	1	–	1
Penn	5	–	2	–	0	7	–	3	–	0
Cornell	5	–	2	–	0	6	–	4	–	0
Dartmouth	4	–	2	–	1	7	–	2	–	1
Columbia	3	–	4	–	0	3	–	6	–	1
Brown	2	–	5	–	0	5	–	5	–	0
Yale	2	–	5	–	0	3	–	7	–	0
Harvard	1	–	6	–	0	2	–	8	–	0
$ – Conference champion

The 1995 Princeton Tigers football team was an American football team that represented Princeton University during the 1995 NCAA Division I-AA football season. Princeton won the Ivy League championship.

In their ninth year under head coach Steve Tosches, the Tigers compiled an 8–1–1 record and outscored opponents 243 to 144. Dave Patterson was the team captain.

Princeton's 5–1–1 conference record topped the Ivy League standings. The Tigers outscored Ivy opponents 148 to 98.

Princeton played its home games at Palmer Stadium on the university campus in Princeton, New Jersey.

== Schedule ==
Date	Opponent	Site	Result	Attendance	Source
September 16	Cornell	Palmer Stadium; Princeton, NJ	W 24–22	7,039	
September 23	Bucknell*	Palmer Stadium; Princeton, NJ	W 20–3	6,910	
September 30	at Colgate*	Andy Kerr Stadium; Hamilton, NY	W 34–23	5,000	
October 7	at Brown	Brown Stadium; Providence, RI	W 21–19	2,396	
October 14	Lafayette*	Palmer Stadium; Princeton, NJ	W 41–0	6,109	
October 21	at Harvard	Harvard Stadium; Boston, MA (rivalry)	W 14–3	16,420	
October 28	Columbia	Palmer Stadium; Princeton, NJ	W 44–14	10,917	
November 4	at Penn	Franklin Field; Philadelphia, PA (rivalry)	W 22–9	34,504	
November 11	Yale	Palmer Stadium; Princeton, NJ (rivalry)	L 13–21		
November 18	Dartmouth	Palmer Stadium; Princeton, NJ	T 10–10	7,118	
*Non-conference game
