= 1995 North Carolina A&T Aggies football team =

American college football season

1995 North Carolina A&T Aggies football
- Conference: Mid-Eastern Athletic Conference
- Record: 4–7 (2–4 MEAC)
- Head coach: Bill Hayes (8th season)
- Home stadium: Aggie Stadium

1995 Mid-Eastern Athletic Conference football standings
	Conf.					Overall
Team	W		L		T	W		L		T
No. 16 Florida A&M $	6	–	0	–	0	9	–	3	–	0
Delaware State	5	–	1	–	0	6	–	5	–	0
South Carolina State	4	–	2	–	0	6	–	4	–	0
Howard	2	–	4	–	0	6	–	5	–	0
North Carolina A&T	2	–	4	–	0	4	–	7	–	0
Bethune–Cookman	2	–	4	–	0	3	–	8	–	0
Morgan State	0	–	6	–	0	1	–	10	–	0
$ – Conference champion; Rankings from The Sports Network poll

The 1995 North Carolina A&T Aggies football team represented North Carolina A&T State University as a member of the Mid-Eastern Athletic Conference (MEAC) during the 1995 NCAA Division I-AA football season. Led by eighth-year head coach Bill Hayes, the Aggies compiled an overall record of 4–7, with a mark of 2–4 in conference play, and finished tied for fourth in the MEAC.

== Schedule ==
Date	Opponent	Site	Result	Attendance	Source
September 3	vs. North Carolina Central*	Carter–Finley Stadium; Raleigh, NC (rivalry)	W 18–17	44,807	
September 9	at Winston-Salem State*	Bowman Gray Stadium; Winston-Salem, NC (rivalry)	W 45–21	24,712	
September 16	No. 2 Appalachian State*	Aggie Stadium; Greensboro, NC	L 31–38	10,001	
September 23	at Jacksonville State*	Paul Snow Stadium; Jacksonville, AL	L 10–21	8,468	
October 7	at No. 23 Florida A&M	Bragg Memorial Stadium; Tallahassee, FL	L 3–20	29,785	
October 14	at Morgan State	Hughes Stadium; Baltimore, MD	W 38–32	5,569	
October 21	Howard	Aggie Stadium; Greensboro, NC	L 14–20	11,211	
October 28	at Bethune–Cookman	Municipal Stadium; Daytona Beach, FL	W 24–21		
November 4	Delaware State	Aggie Stadium; Greensboro, NC	L 10–17	6,526	
November 11	Lane*	Aggie Stadium; Greensboro, NC	L 4–12		
November 18	vs. South Carolina State	American Legion Memorial Stadium; Charlotte, NC (Carolinas Football Classic)	L 27–28	21,678	
*Non-conference game; Rankings from The Sports Network Poll released prior to the game
