= 1995 Marshall Thundering Herd football team =

American college football season

1995 Marshall Thundering Herd football

NCAA Division I-AA Championship Game, L 22–20 vs. Montana
- Conference: Southern Conference

Ranking
- Sports Network: No. 6
- Record: 12–3 (7–1 SoCon)
- Head coach: Jim Donnan (6th season)
- Offensive coordinator: Chris Scelfo (3rd season)
- Captains: Jerome Embry; Jayson Grayson; Billy Lyon; Tim Martin; Chris Parker; William Pannell
- Home stadium: Marshall University Stadium

1995 Southern Conference football standings
	Conf.					Overall
Team	W		L		T	W		L		T
No. 2 Appalachian State $^	8	–	0	–	0	12	–	1	–	0
No. 6 Marshall ^	7	–	1	–	0	12	–	3	–	0
No. 15 Georgia Southern ^	5	–	3	–	0	9	–	4	–	0
Furman	5	–	3	–	0	6	–	5	–	0
East Tennessee State	4	–	4	–	0	4	–	7	–	0
VMI	3	–	5	–	0	4	–	7	–	0
Chattanooga	2	–	6	–	0	4	–	7	–	0
Western Carolina	2	–	6	–	0	3	–	7	–	0
The Citadel	0	–	8	–	0	2	–	9	–	0
$ – Conference champion; ^ – NCAA Division I-AA playoff participant; Rankings from The Sports Network poll

The 1995 Marshall Thundering Herd football team represented Marshall University as a member of the Southern Conference (SoCon) during the 1995 NCAA Division I-AA football season. Led by sixth-year head coach Jim Donnan, the Thundering Herd compiled an overall record of 12–3 with a mark of 7–1 in conference play, placing second in the SoCon. Marshall advanced to the NCAA Division I-AA Championship playoffs for the fifth straight season, where they defeated Jackson State in the first round, Northern Iowa in the quarterfinals, and McNeese State in the semifinals, before losing to Montana in the NCAA Division I-AA Championship Game. Marshall played home games at Marshall University Stadium in Huntington, West Virginia.

== Regular season ==
Marshall was quarterbacked by true freshman and future NFL starter Chad Pennington after starting sophomore quarterback Mark Zban re-injured his knee delivering a touchdown pass to future NFL starter Jermaine Wiggins. Starting running back Chris Parker set the Marshall single season rushing record with 1,833 rushing yards.

== Postseason ==
Marshall advanced to the 1995 NCAA I-AA playoffs with an at large bid, but held home field advantage for the first two games, defeating Jackson State and Northern Iowa in Huntington before going on the road against McNeese State in the semifinal game. Marshall defeated McNeese State and advanced to the I-AA National Championship game, which was held at Marshall's stadium against the Montana Grizzlies. This was the fourth consecutive I-AA National Championship game hosted by Marshall. Marshall lost the championship game, 22–20.

== Schedule ==
Date	Opponent	Rank	Site	Result	Attendance	Source
August 31	at NC State*	No. 2	Carter–Finley Stadium; Raleigh, NC	L 16–33	44,259	
September 9	Tennessee Tech*	No. 3	Marshall University Stadium; Huntington, WV	W 45–14		
September 16	No. 13 Georgia Southern	No. 4	Marshall University Stadium; Huntington, WV	W 37–7	19,983	
September 30	at Chattanooga	No. 3	Chamberlain Field; Chattanooga, TN	W 35–32	8,576	
October 7	VMI	No. 3	Marshall University Stadium; Huntington, WV	W 56–21	19,702	
October 14	at Western Carolina	No. 3	E. J. Whitmire Stadium; Cullowhee, NC	W 42–3	3,858	
October 21	No. 2 Appalachian State	No. 3	Marshall University Stadium; Huntington, WV (rivalry)	L 3–10	26,982	
October 28	at The Citadel	No. 7	Johnson Hagood Stadium; Charleston, SC	W 21–19	11,833	
November 4	East Tennessee State	No. 7	Marshall University Stadium; Huntington, WV	W 52–0	18,749	
November 11	at Furman	No. 7	Paladin Stadium; Greenville, SC	W 31–6	10,688	
November 18	No. 7 Hofstra*	No. 6	Marshall University Stadium; Huntington, WV	W 30–28	17,080	
November 25	Jackson State*	No. 6	Marshall University Stadium; Huntington, WV (NCAA Division I-AA First Round)	W 38–8	13,035	
December 2	No. 18 Northern Iowa*	No. 6	Marshall University Stadium; Huntington, WV (NCAA Division I-AA Quarterfinal)	W 41–24	14,472	
December 9	at No. 1 McNeese State*	No. 6	Cowboy Stadium; Lake Charles, LA (NCAA Division I-AA Semifinal)	W 25–13	18,018	
December 16	No. 8 Montana*	No. 6	Marshall University Stadium; Huntington, WV (NCAA Division I-AA Championship Game)	L 20–22	32,106	
*Non-conference game; Rankings from The Sports Network Poll released prior to the game
