= 1995 VMI Keydets football team =

American college football season

1995 VMI Keydets football
- Conference: Southern Conference
- Record: 4–7 (3–5 SoCon)
- Head coach: Bill Stewart (2nd season)
- Home stadium: Alumni Memorial Field

1995 Southern Conference football standings
	Conf.					Overall
Team	W		L		T	W		L		T
No. 2 Appalachian State $^	8	–	0	–	0	12	–	1	–	0
No. 6 Marshall ^	7	–	1	–	0	12	–	3	–	0
No. 15 Georgia Southern ^	5	–	3	–	0	9	–	4	–	0
Furman	5	–	3	–	0	6	–	5	–	0
East Tennessee State	4	–	4	–	0	4	–	7	–	0
VMI	3	–	5	–	0	4	–	7	–	0
Chattanooga	2	–	6	–	0	4	–	7	–	0
Western Carolina	2	–	6	–	0	3	–	7	–	0
The Citadel	0	–	8	–	0	2	–	9	–	0
$ – Conference champion; ^ – NCAA Division I-AA playoff participant; Rankings from The Sports Network poll

The 1995 VMI Keydets football team was an American football team that represented the Virginia Military Institute (VMI) as a member of the Southern Conference (SoCon) during the 1995 NCAA Division I-AA football season. In their second year under head coach Bill Stewart, the team compiled an overall record of 4–7, with a mark of 3–5 in conference play, placing sixth in the SoCon.

== Schedule ==
Date	Opponent	Site	Result	Attendance	Source
September 2	at Richmond*	City Stadium; Richmond, VA (rivalry)	L 28–51	13,142	
September 9	Liberty*	Alumni Memorial Field; Lexington, VA	W 50–31	7,211	
September 16	East Tennessee State	Alumni Memorial Field; Lexington, VA	W 37–23	6,732	
September 23	at Furman	Paladin Stadium; Greenville, SC	L 24–55	8,994	
September 30	No. 18 William & Mary*	Alumni Memorial Field; Lexington, VA (rivalry)	L 7–27	7,896	
October 7	at No. 3 Marshall	Marshall University Stadium; Huntington, WV	L 21–56	19,702	
October 14	Chattanooga	Alumni Memorial Field; Lexington, VA	W 17–12	6,927	
October 28	at Western Carolina	E. J. Whitmire Stadium; Cullowhee, NC	L 14–31	8,878	
November 4	No. 2 Appalachian State	Alumni Memorial Field; Lexington, VA	L 24–26	6,207	
November 11	at The Citadel	Johnson Hagood Stadium; Charleston, SC (rivalry)	W 34–7	15,757	
November 18	vs. No. 17 Georgia Southern	Foreman Field; Norfolk, VA (Oyster Bowl)	L 13–31	8,414	
*Non-conference game; Rankings from The Sports Network Poll released prior to the game
