= 1995 Rhode Island Rams football team =

American college football season

1995 Rhode Island Rams football

Yankee New England Division champion
- Conference: Yankee Conference
- New England Division
- Record: 7–4 (6–2 Yankee Conference)
- Head coach: Floyd Keith (3rd season)
- Defensive coordinator: Mike Mallory (3rd season)
- Home stadium: Meade Stadium

1995 Yankee Conference football standings
	Conf.					Overall
Team	W		L		T	W		L		T
New England Division
Rhode Island x	6	–	2	–	0	7	–	4	–	0
No. 23 Connecticut	5	–	3	–	0	8	–	3	–	0
New Hampshire	4	–	4	–	0	6	–	5	–	0
UMass	3	–	5	–	0	6	–	5	–	0
Boston University	1	–	7	–	0	3	–	8	–	0
Maine	1	–	7	–	0	3	–	8	–	0
Mid-Atlantic Division
No. 7 Delaware x$^	8	–	0	–	0	11	–	2	–	0
No. 13 James Madison ^	6	–	2	–	0	8	–	4	–	0
No. 19 William & Mary	5	–	3	–	0	7	–	4	–	0
No. 20 Richmond	5	–	3	–	0	7	–	3	–	1
Northeastern	2	–	6	–	0	4	–	7	–	0
Villanova	2	–	6	–	0	3	–	8	–	0
$ – Conference champion; x – Division champion/co-champions; ^ – NCAA Division I-AA playoff participant; Rankings from The Sports Network poll

The 1995 Rhode Island Rams football team was an American football team that represented the University of Rhode Island in the Yankee Conference during the 1995 NCAA Division I-AA football season. In their third season under head coach Floyd Keith, the Rams compiled a 7–4 record (6–2 against conference opponents) and finished first in the New England Division of the Yankee Conference.

== Schedule ==
Date	Opponent	Rank	Site	Result	Attendance	Source
September 2	at Delaware State*		Alumni Stadium; Dover, DE	W 17–14	3,982	
September 9	Maine		Meade Stadium; Kingston, RI	W 17–13	4,124	
September 16	at No. 22 New Hampshire		Cowell Stadium; Durham, NH	W 10–7	5,077	
September 23	at Brown*		Brown Stadium; Providence, RI (rivalry)	L 28–31	4,052	
September 30	UMass		Meade Stadium; Kingston, RI	W 34–0	5,005	
October 7	at No. 17 William & Mary		Zable Stadium; Williamsburg, VA	L 14–23	7,230	
October 14	at Boston University		Nickerson Field; Boston, MA	W 22–19	8,201	
October 21	No. 15 Connecticut^{†}		Meade Stadium; Kingston, RI (rivalry)	W 24–19	7,237	
November 4	Villanova	No. 23	Meade Stadium; Kingston, RI	W 27–10	8,044	
November 11	No. 8 Hofstra*	No. 22	Meade Stadium; Kingston, RI	L 3–37	5,837	
November 18	No. 8 Delaware		Meade Stadium; Kingston, RI	L 19–24	7,890	
*Non-conference game; ^{†}Homecoming; Rankings from The Sports Network Poll released prior to the game
