= 1995 Lafayette Leopards football team =

American college football season

1995 Lafayette Leopards football
- Conference: Patriot League
- Record: 4–6–1 (3–2 Patriot)
- Head coach: Bill Russo (15th season)
- Captains: Glenn Hunzinger; Gavin Morrissey; Jarrett Shine
- Home stadium: Fisher Field

1995 Patriot League football standings
	Conf.					Overall
Team	W		L		T	W		L		T
Lehigh $	5	–	0	–	0	8	–	3	–	0
Bucknell	4	–	1	–	0	7	–	4	–	0
Lafayette	3	–	2	–	0	4	–	6	–	1
Fordham	2	–	3	–	0	4	–	6	–	1
Holy Cross	1	–	4	–	0	2	–	9	–	0
Colgate	0	–	5	–	0	0	–	11	–	0
$ – Conference champion

The 1995 Lafayette Leopards football team was an American football team that represented Lafayette College during the 1995 NCAA Division I-AA football season. Lafayette finished third in the Patriot League.

In their 15th year under head coach Bill Russo, the Leopards compiled a 4–6–1 record. Glenn Hunzinger, Gavin Morrissey and Jarrett Shine were the team captains.

The Leopards were outscored 250 to 176. Lafayette's 3–2 conference record placed third in the six-team Patriot League standings.

Lafayette played its home games at Fisher Field on College Hill in Easton, Pennsylvania.

== Schedule ==
Date	Opponent	Site	Result	Attendance	Source
September 9	at Buffalo*	University at Buffalo Stadium; Amherst, NY	W 24–17	6,058	
September 16	at Hofstra*	Hofstra Stadium; Hempstead, NY	L 0–26	4,372	
September 23	No. 16 Penn*	Fisher Field; Easton, PA	L 8 28	7,895	
September 30	Columbia*	Fisher Field; Easton, PA	T 10–10	8,156	
October 7	at Dartmouth*	Memorial Field; Hanover, NH	L 7–14	3,108	
October 14	at Princeton*	Palmer Stadium; Princeton, NJ	L 0–41	6,109	
October 21	at Holy Cross	Fitton Field; Worcester, MA	W 27–17	4,128	
October 28	at Bucknell	Christy Mathewson–Memorial Stadium; Lewisburg, PA	L 11–30	5,061	
November 4	Colgate	Fisher Field; Easton, PA	W 35–9	4,065	
November 11	Fordham*	Fisher Field; Easton, PA	W 24–21 ^{OT}	3,714	
November 18	at Lehigh	Goodman Stadium; Bethlehem, PA (The Rivalry)	L 30–37 ^{OT}	15,412	
*Non-conference game; Rankings from The Sports Network Poll released prior to the game
