= 1995 Fordham Rams football team =

American college football season

1995 Fordham Rams football
- Conference: Patriot League
- Record: 4–6–1 (2–3 Patriot)
- Head coach: Nick Quartaro (2nd season)
- Defensive coordinator: Vince Sinagra (2nd season)
- Captains: Jim Ciarlante; Joe Moorhead; Chris O'Leary; Won Kyu Rim; Steve Borys
- Home stadium: Coffey Field

1995 Patriot League football standings
	Conf.					Overall
Team	W		L		T	W		L		T
Lehigh $	5	–	0	–	0	8	–	3	–	0
Bucknell	4	–	1	–	0	7	–	4	–	0
Lafayette	3	–	2	–	0	4	–	6	–	1
Fordham	2	–	3	–	0	4	–	6	–	1
Holy Cross	1	–	4	–	0	2	–	9	–	0
Colgate	0	–	5	–	0	0	–	11	–	0
$ – Conference champion

The 1995 Fordham Rams football team was an American football team that represented Fordham University during the 1995 NCAA Division I-AA football season. Fordham finished fourth in the Patriot League.

In their second year under head coach Nick Quartaro, the Rams compiled a 4–6–1 record. Jim Ciarlante, Joe Moorhead, Steve Borys, Chris O'Leary and Won Kyu Rim were the team captains.

The Rams were outscored 236 to 208. Their 2–3 conference record placed last in the six-team Patriot League standings.

Fordham played its home games at Jack Coffey Field on the university campus in The Bronx, in New York City.

== Schedule ==
Date	Opponent	Site	Result	Attendance	Source
September 2	at Buffalo*	University at Buffalo Stadium; Amherst, NY	L 13–49	7,025	
September 9	Marist*	Coffey Field; Bronx, NY	W 46–0	2,478	
September 16	Bucknell	Coffey Field; Bronx, NY	L 21–28		
September 23	Dartmouth*	Coffey Field; Bronx, NY	L 14–34	5,311	
September 30	at Harvard*	Harvard Stadium; Boston, MA	W 24–21	5,320	
October 7	at Colgate	Andy Kerr Stadium; Hamilton, NY	W 34–14	1,100	
October 14	No. 14 Hofstra^{†}*	Coffey Field; Bronx, NY	L 15–36	1,645	
October 21	No. 16 Richmond*	Coffey Field; Bronx, NY	T 3–3	516	
October 28	vs. Holy Cross	Bermuda National Stadium; Devonshire Parish, Bermuda (rivalry)	W 17–10	2,436	
November 4	Lehigh	Coffey Field; Bronx, NY	L 0–17	1,987	
November 11	at Lafayette	Fisher Field; Easton, PA	L 21–24	3,714	
*Non-conference game; ^{†}Homecoming; Rankings from The Sports Network Poll released prior to the game
