= 1995 Georgia Southern Eagles football team =

American college football season

1995 Georgia Southern Eagles football

NCAA Division I-AA Quarterfinal, L 0–45 at Montana
- Conference: Southern Conference

Ranking
- Sports Network: No. 15
- Record: 9–4 (5–3 SoCon)
- Head coach: Tim Stowers (6th season)
- Offensive coordinator: Daryl Dickey (1st season)
- Defensive coordinator: Tommy Spangler (6th season)
- Home stadium: Paulson Stadium

1995 Southern Conference football standings
	Conf.					Overall
Team	W		L		T	W		L		T
No. 2 Appalachian State $^	8	–	0	–	0	12	–	1	–	0
No. 6 Marshall ^	7	–	1	–	0	12	–	3	–	0
No. 15 Georgia Southern ^	5	–	3	–	0	9	–	4	–	0
Furman	5	–	3	–	0	6	–	5	–	0
East Tennessee State	4	–	4	–	0	4	–	7	–	0
VMI	3	–	5	–	0	4	–	7	–	0
Chattanooga	2	–	6	–	0	4	–	7	–	0
Western Carolina	2	–	6	–	0	3	–	7	–	0
The Citadel	0	–	8	–	0	2	–	9	–	0
$ – Conference champion; ^ – NCAA Division I-AA playoff participant; Rankings from The Sports Network poll

The 1995 Georgia Southern Eagles football team represented Georgia Southern University as a member of the Southern Conference (SoCon) during the 1995 NCAA Division I-AA football season. Led by Tim Stowers in his sixth and final season as head coach, the Eagles compiled an overall record of 9–4 with a conference mark of 5–3, trying for third place in the SoCon. Georgia Southern advanced to the NCAA Division I-AA Football Championship playoffs, where they beat Troy State in the first round before falling to eventual national champion Montana in the quarterfinals. The Eagles played their home games at Paulson Stadium in Statesboro, Georgia.

== Schedule ==
Date	Opponent	Rank	Site	Result	Attendance	Source
September 2	South Carolina State*	No. 24	Paulson Stadium; Statesboro, GA	W 27–12	13,084	
September 9	vs. Middle Tennessee*	No. 17	Georgia Dome; Atlanta, GA	W 34–26	9,529	
September 16	at No. 4 Marshall	No. 13	Marshall University Stadium; Huntington, WV	L 7–37	19,983	
September 23	Chattanooga	No. 18	Paulson Stadium; Statesboro, GA	W 35–9	13,503	
October 7	Western Carolina	No. 14	Paulson Stadium; Statesboro, GA	W 42–0	11,430	
October 14	at No. 2 Appalachian State	No. 13	Kidd Brewer Stadium; Boone, NC (rivalry)	L 17–27	8,797	
October 21	The Citadel	No. 17	Paulson Stadium; Statesboro, GA	W 27–0	14,201	
October 28	at East Tennessee State	No. 13	Memorial Center; Johnson City, TN	L 16–21	4,977	
November 4	Furman	No. 22	Paulson Stadium; Statesboro, GA	W 27–20	15,305	
November 11	at Liberty*	No. 21	Williams Stadium; Lynchburg, VA	W 7–6	3,325	
November 18	vs. VMI	No. 17	Foreman Field; Norfolk, VA (Oyster Bowl)	W 31–13	8,414	
November 25	at No. 3 Troy State*	No. 15	Veterans Memorial Stadium; Troy, AL (NCAA Division I-AA First Round)	W 24–21	6,000	
December 2	at No. 8 Montana*	No. 15	Washington–Grizzly Stadium; Missoula, MT (NCAA Division I-AA Quarterfinal)	L 0–45	18,518	
*Non-conference game; Rankings from The Sports Network Poll released prior to the game
