= 1995 Sacramento State Hornets football team =

American college football season

1995 Sacramento State Hornets football

AWC champion
- Conference: American West Conference
- Record: 4–6–1 (3–0 AWC)
- Head coach: John Volek (1st season)
- Home stadium: Hornet Stadium

1995 American West Conference football standings
	Conf.					Overall
Team	W		L		T	W		L		T
Sacramento State $	3	–	0	–	0	4	–	6	–	1
Cal Poly	2	–	1	–	0	5	–	6	–	0
Cal State Northridge	1	–	2	–	0	2	–	8	–	0
Southern Utah	0	–	3	–	0	2	–	9	–	0
$ – Conference champion

The 1995 Sacramento State Hornets football team represented California State University, Sacramento as a member of the American West Conference (AWC) during the 1995 NCAA Division I-AA football season. Led by first-year head coach John Volek, Sacramento State compiled an overall record of 4–6–1 with a mark of 3–0 in conference play, winning the AWC title. The team was outscored by its opponents 377 to 255 for the season. The Hornets played home games at Hornet Stadium in Sacramento, California.

== Schedule ==
Date	Opponent	Site	Result	Attendance	Source
September 9	at No. 25 Northern Arizona*	Walkup Skydome; Flagstaff, AZ	L 7–62	7,927	
September 16	at Eastern Washington*	Woodward Field; Cheney, WA	L 18–21	4,872	
September 23	Chico State*	Hornet Stadium; Sacramento, CA	T 21–21	4,768	
September 30	No. 18 (D-II) Portland State*	Hornet Stadium; Sacramento, CA	L 16–54	3,917	
October 7	No. 15 Hofstra*	Hornet Stadium; Sacramento, CA	L 15–55	2,047	
October 14	Southwest Texas State*	Hornet Stadium; Sacramento, CA	W 12–3	2,084	
October 21	at Cal Poly	Mustang Stadium; San Luis Obispo, CA	W 37–36	8,047	
October 28	UC Davis*	Hornet Stadium; Sacramento, CA (Causeway Classic)	L 42–52	10,648	
November 4	Saint Mary's*	Hornet Stadium; Sacramento, CA	L 14–28	2,685	
November 11	Southern Utah	Hornet Stadium; Sacramento, CA	W 53–29	2,318	
November 18	at Cal State Northridge	North Campus Stadium; Northridge, CA	W 20–16	2,418	
*Non-conference game; Rankings from The Sports Network Poll released prior to the game
