= 1995 Sonoma State Cossacks football team =

American college football season

1995 Sonoma State Cossacks football
- Conference: Northern California Athletic Conference
- Record: 0–8–1 (0–3–1 NCAC)
- Head coach: Frank Scalercio (3rd season)
- Defensive coordinator: Dennis Caryl (1st season)
- Home stadium: Cossacks Stadium

1995 Northern California Athletic Conference football standings
	Conf.					Overall
Team	W		L		T	W		L		T
Humboldt State $	4	–	0	–	0	8	–	1	–	1
Chico State	1	–	2	–	1	2	–	5	–	2
Sonoma State	0	–	3	–	1	0	–	8	–	1
$ – Conference champion

The 1995 Sonoma State Cossacks football team represented Sonoma State University as a member of the Northern California Athletic Conference (NCAC) during the 1995 NCAA Division II football season. Led by third-year head coach Frank Scalercio, Sonoma State compiled an overall record of 0–8–1 with a mark of 0–3–1 in conference play, placing last out of three teams in the NCAC. The team was outscored by its opponents 374 to 75 for the season. The average score in the eight losses was 44–7. The Cossacks played home games at Cossacks Stadium (Note: Cossacks Stadium was renamed in 2002 to Seawolf Stadium when the University changed the name of the mascot to Seawolves.) in Rohnert Park, California.

== Schedule ==
Date	Opponent	Site	Result	Attendance	Source
September 2	at Saint Mary's*	Saint Mary's Stadium; Moraga, CA	L 7–59	2,234	
September 16	at No. 16 (I-AA) Idaho*	Kibbie Dome; Moscow, ID	L 3–66	13,281–13,519	
September 23	at UC Davis*	Toomey Field; Davis, CA	L 0–35	5,435–6,300	
September 30	at Chico State	University Stadium; Chico, CA	T 21–21	1,350	
October 7	Humboldt State	Cossacks Stadium; Rohnert Park, CA	L 13–24	1,641	
October 14	Cal Poly*	Cossacks Stadium; Rohnert Park, CA	L 10–56	876	
October 28	at Humboldt State	Redwood Bowl; Arcata, CA	L 7–35	3,450–3,457	
November 4	Chico State	Cossacks Stadium; Rohnert Park, CA	L 14–26	521	
November 11	at No. 9 Portland State*	Civic Stadium; Portland, OR	L 0–52	8,109	
*Non-conference game; Rankings from NCAA Division II Football Committee Poll released prior to the game

== Team players in the NFL ==
The following Sonoma State player was selected in the 1996 NFL draft.

Player	Position	Round	Overall	NFL team
Freddie Bradley	Running back	7	231	San Diego Chargers
