= 1995 NCAA Division II football season =

American college football season

- Regular season: September 2 – November 11, 1995
- Playoffs: November 18 – December 9, 1995
- National Championship: Braly Municipal Stadium; Florence, AL
- Champion: North Alabama
- Harlon Hill Trophy: Ronald McKinnon, North Alabama

The 1995 NCAA Division II football season, part of college football in the United States organized by the National Collegiate Athletic Association at the Division II level, began on September 2, 1995, and concluded with the NCAA Division II Football Championship on December 9, 1995, at Braly Municipal Stadium in Florence, Alabama, hosted by the University of North Alabama. The North Alabama Lions defeated the Pittsburg State Gorillas, 27–7, to win their third consecutive, and overall, Division II national title.

The Harlon Hill Trophy was awarded to Ronald McKinnon, linebacker from North Alabama.

== Conference changes and new programs ==
- The NAIA Arkansas Intercollegiate Conference disbanded before the start of the season, with its football members departing for the Gulf South and Lone Star conferences.
- Two teams departed Division II for Division I-AA prior to the season.

Team	1994 conference	1995 conference
Albany (NY)	D-III independent	D-II independent
Arkansas–Monticello	Arkansas (NAIA)	Gulf South
Arkansas Tech	Arkansas (NAIA)	Gulf South
Hampton	CIAA	MEAC (I-AA)
Lane	Club Program	D-II Independent
Quincy	Illini-Badger (D-III)	Independent
San Francisco State	Northern California	Dropped program
Southern Arkansas	Arkansas (NAIA)	Gulf South
Tarleton State	NAIA Independent	Lone Star
West Virginia State	NAIA Independent	WVIAC
Wofford	D-II Independent	I-AA Independent

== Conference standings ==
1995 Central Intercollegiate Athletic Association football standings
	Conf.					Overall
Team	W		L		T	W		L		T
No. 10 Virginia State $	7	–	1	–	0	8	–	2	–	0
Norfolk State	6	–	2	–	0	7	–	3	–	0
Elizabeth City State	6	–	2	–	0	7	–	4	–	0
Livingstone	4	–	3	–	1	5	–	4	–	1
North Carolina Central	4	–	4	–	0	5	–	6	–	0
Winston-Salem State	3	–	3	–	2	4	–	4	–	2
Bowie State	2	–	6	–	0	3	–	8	–	0
Johnson C. Smith	2	–	6	–	0	2	–	8	–	0
Fayetteville State	1	–	5	–	2	1	–	7	–	2
Virginia Union	0	–	6	–	2	0	–	8	–	2
$ – Conference champion; Teams played designated conference games against non-CIAA members.; Rankings from NCAA Division II Football Committee poll

1995 Eastern Collegiate Football Conference standings
	Conf.					Overall
Team	W		L		T	W		L		T
Stonehill $	8	–	0	–	0	9	–	1	–	0
Bentley	7	–	1	–	0	9	–	1	–	0
Salve Regina	6	–	2	–	0	7	–	2	–	0
Assumption	5	–	3	–	0	6	–	4	–	0
MIT	3	–	4	–	0	3	–	5	–	0
Sacred Heart	2	–	4	–	0	3	–	7	–	0
Western New England	2	–	6	–	0	2	–	6	–	0
Curry	1	–	7	–	0	2	–	8	–	0
Nichols	0	–	7	–	0	0	–	9	–	0
$ – Conference champion

1995 Gulf South Conference football standings
	Conf.					Overall
Team	W		L		T	W		L		T
No. 1 North Alabama $^	8	–	0	–	0	14	–	0	–	0
No. 17 West Georgia ^	7	–	1	–	0	8	–	3	–	0
Central Arkansas	6	–	3	–	0	7	–	4	–	0
Henderson State	6	–	3	–	0	6	–	5	–	0
Valdosta State	4	–	3	–	0	6	–	5	–	0
Delta State	5	–	4	–	0	5	–	6	–	0
Arkansas–Monticello	3	–	3	–	0	6	–	5	–	0
Arkansas Tech	2	–	6	–	1	3	–	6	–	1
Mississippi College	2	–	7	–	1	2	–	7	–	1
Southern Arkansas	1	–	6	–	0	4	–	6	–	0
West Alabama	0	–	8	–	0	2	–	9	–	0
$ – Conference champion; ^ – NCAA Division II playoff participant; Rankings from NCAA Division II Football Committee poll

1995 Lone Star Conference football standings
	Conf.					Overall
Team	W		L		T	W		L		T
No. 2 Texas A&M–Kingsville $^	7	–	0	–	0	11	–	2	–	0
No. 11 East Texas State ^	6	–	1	–	0	8	–	4	–	0
No. 15 Angelo State	4	–	2	–	1	6	–	3	–	1
Central Oklahoma	4	–	3	–	0	8	–	3	–	0
Eastern New Mexico	3	–	3	–	1	6	–	4	–	1
Abilene Christian	2	–	5	–	0	4	–	7	–	0
West Texas A&M	1	–	6	–	0	5	–	6	–	0
Tarleton State	0	–	7	–	0	1	–	10	–	0
$ – Conference champion; ^ – NCAA Division II playoff participant; Rankings from NCAA Division II Football Committee poll

1995 Mid-America Intercollegiate Athletics Association football standings
	Conf.					Overall
Team	W		L		T	W		L		T
No. 4 Pittsburg State $^	9	–	0	–	0	12	–	1	–	1
No. 20 Missouri Western	6	–	3	–	0	7	–	3	–	1
NE Missouri State	6	–	3	–	0	6	–	5	–	0
NW Missouri State	6	–	3	–	0	6	–	5	–	0
Missouri Southern	5	–	4	–	0	6	–	4	–	0
Emporia State	4	–	5	–	0	5	–	6	–	0
Washburn	3	–	6	–	0	4	–	6	–	0
Central Missouri State	3	–	6	–	0	4	–	6	–	0
Southwest Baptist	2	–	7	–	0	2	–	8	–	0
Missouri–Rolla	1	–	8	–	0	1	–	9	–	0
$ – Conference champion; ^ – NCAA Division II playoff participant; Rankings from NCAA Division II Football Committee poll

1995 Midwest Intercollegiate Football Conference standings
	Conf.					Overall
Team	W		L		T	W		L		T
No. 3 Ferris State $^	10	–	0	–	0	12	–	1	–	0
Grand Valley State	8	–	2	–	0	8	–	3	–	0
Northern Michigan	7	–	3	–	0	7	–	3	–	0
Saginaw Valley State	7	–	3	–	0	7	–	3	–	0
Hillsdale	7	–	3	–	0	7	–	4	–	0
Michigan Tech	5	–	5	–	0	5	–	5	–	0
St. Francis (IL)	5	–	5	–	0	5	–	6	–	0
Indianapolis	3	–	7	–	0	3	–	8	–	0
Wayne State (MI)	3	–	7	–	0	3	–	8	–	0
Ashland	2	–	8	–	0	2	–	8	–	0
Northwood	2	–	8	–	0	2	–	8	–	0
Saint Joseph's (IN)	1	–	9	–	0	1	–	9	–	0
$ – Conference champion; ^ – NCAA Division II playoff participant; Rankings from NCAA Division II Football Committee poll

1995 North Central Conference football standings
	Conf.					Overall
Team	W		L		T	W		L		T
No. 7 North Dakota $^	8	–	1	–	0	9	–	2	–	0
No. 13 North Dakota State ^	7	–	2	–	0	10	–	3	–	0
No. 16 Northern Colorado ^	7	–	2	–	0	9	–	3	–	0
South Dakota	6	–	3	–	0	8	–	3	–	0
St. Cloud State	5	–	4	–	0	6	–	4	–	0
South Dakota State	4	–	5	–	0	6	–	5	–	0
Mankato State	3	–	6	–	0	4	–	7	–	0
Augustana (SD)	2	–	6	–	1	3	–	6	–	1
Nebraska–Omaha	2	–	7	–	0	3	–	8	–	0
Morningside	0	–	8	–	1	0	–	9	–	2
$ – Conference champion; ^ – NCAA Division II playoff participant; Rankings from NCAA Division II Football Committee poll

1995 Northern California Athletic Conference football standings
	Conf.					Overall
Team	W		L		T	W		L		T
Humboldt State $	4	–	0	–	0	8	–	1	–	1
Chico State	1	–	2	–	1	2	–	5	–	2
Sonoma State	0	–	3	–	1	0	–	8	–	1
$ – Conference champion

1995 Northern Sun Intercollegiate Conference football standings
	Conf.					Overall
Team	W		L		T	W		L		T
Minnesota Duluth +	5	–	0	–	1	8	–	2	–	1
Moorhead State +	5	–	0	–	1	6	–	3	–	1
Winona State	3	–	3	–	0	6	–	5	–	0
Bemidji State	3	–	3	–	0	3	–	7	–	0
Northern State	2	–	4	–	0	4	–	7	–	0
Southwest State (MN)	2	–	4	–	0	2	–	8	–	0
Minnesota Morris	0	–	6	–	0	0	–	10	–	0
+ – Conference co-champions

1995 Pennsylvania State Athletic Conference football standings
	Conf.					Overall
Team	W		L		T	W		L		T
East Division
Bloomsburg x	5	–	0	–	1	9	–	1	–	1
No. 14 Millersville x^	5	–	0	–	1	9	–	1	–	1
Kutztown	4	–	2	–	0	6	–	4	–	0
East Stroudsburg	3	–	3	–	0	4	–	6	–	0
West Chester	2	–	4	–	0	4	–	6	–	1
Mansfield	1	–	5	–	0	1	–	9	–	0
Cheyney	0	–	6	–	0	0	–	10	–	1
West Division
No. 8 Edinboro x^	6	–	0	–	0	9	–	2	–	0
No. 19 IUP	5	–	1	–	0	8	–	3	–	0
Slippery Rock	4	–	2	–	0	7	–	4	–	0
Clarion	3	–	3	–	0	6	–	4	–	0
Shippensburg	2	–	4	–	0	3	–	8	–	0
California (PA)	1	–	5	–	0	2	–	9	–	0
Lock Haven	0	–	6	–	0	2	–	9	–	0
x – Division champion/co-champions; ^ – NCAA Division II playoff participant; Rankings from NCAA Division II Football Committee poll

1995 Rocky Mountain Athletic Conference football standings
	Conf.					Overall
Team	W		L		T	W		L		T
No. 18 Fort Hays State +^	6	–	0	–	1	8	–	2	–	2
Western State (CO) +	6	–	0	–	1	7	–	2	–	1
Chadron State	5	–	2	–	0	8	–	2	–	0
Adams State	3	–	4	–	0	4	–	6	–	0
Fort Lewis	3	–	4	–	0	4	–	6	–	0
New Mexico Highlands	2	–	5	–	0	4	–	7	–	0
Mesa State	2	–	5	–	0	3	–	7	–	0
Colorado Mines	0	–	7	–	0	1	–	9	–	0
Nebraska–Kearney *	0	–	0	–	0	6	–	3	–	1
+ – Conference co-champions; ^ – NCAA Division II playoff participant; * – ineligible for conference title; Rankings from NCAA Division II Football Committee poll

1995 South Atlantic Conference football standings
	Conf.					Overall
Team	W		L		T	W		L		T
No. 6 Carson–Newman $^	6	–	1	–	0	9	–	3	–	0
Catawba	5	–	2	–	0	7	–	3	–	0
Gardner–Webb	4	–	3	–	0	6	–	4	–	0
Mars Hill	4	–	3	–	0	6	–	4	–	0
Presbyterian	4	–	3	–	0	6	–	5	–	0
Elon	2	–	5	–	0	4	–	7	–	0
Lenoir–Rhyne	2	–	5	–	0	3	–	7	–	0
Wingate	1	–	6	–	0	4	–	7	–	0
$ – Conference champion; ^ – NCAA Division II playoff participant; Rankings from NCAA Division II Football Committee poll

1995 Southern Intercollegiate Athletic Conference football standings
	Conf.					Overall
Team	W		L		T	W		L		T
No. 12 Albany State $^	7	–	1	–	0	8	–	4	–	0
Alabama A&M	5	–	3	–	0	6	–	5	–	0
Clark Atlanta	5	–	3	–	0	5	–	5	–	0
Morehouse	5	–	3	–	0	5	–	6	–	0
Savannah State	4	–	4	–	0	7	–	4	–	0
Miles	4	–	4	–	0	4	–	6	–	0
Fort Valley State	3	–	5	–	0	3	–	8	–	0
Tuskegee	2	–	6	–	0	2	–	8	–	0
Morris Brown	1	–	7	–	0	1	–	9	–	0
Kentucky State	0	–	0	–	0	7	–	4	–	0
$ – Conference champion; ^ – NCAA Division II playoff participant; Rankings from NCAA Division II Football Committee poll

1995 West Virginia Intercollegiate Athletic Conference football standings
	Conf.					Overall
Team	W		L		T	W		L		T
Glenville State +	6	–	1	–	0	8	–	2	–	0
West Virginia Wesleyan +	6	–	1	–	0	8	–	2	–	0
West Liberty State	5	–	2	–	0	7	–	3	–	0
Fairmont State	5	–	2	–	0	6	–	4	–	0
Shepherd	3	–	4	–	0	3	–	7	–	0
Concord	2	–	5	–	0	3	–	7	–	0
West Virginia State	1	–	6	–	0	1	–	9	–	0
West Virginia Tech	0	–	7	–	0	0	–	10	–	0
+ – Conference co-champions

1995 NCAA Division II independents football records
	Conf.			Overall
Team	W	L	T	W		L		T
No. 5 New Haven ^		–		10	–	1	–	1
Lane		–		9	–	1	–	0
Southern Connecticut State		–		8	–	3	–	0
Gannon		–		7	–	3	–	0
Mercyhurst		–		7	–	3	–	0
No. 9 Portland State ^		–		8	–	5	–	0
UC Davis		–		6	–	3	–	1
Pace		–		6	–	4	–	0
Wayne State (NE)		–		6	–	4	–	0
Kentucky Wesleyan		–		5	–	5	–	0
Western New Mexico		–		4	–	5	–	0
Albany		–		3	–	7	–	0
American International		–		2	–	8	–	0
^ – NCAA Division II playoff participant; Rankings from NCAA Division II Football Committee poll

== Conference summaries ==
Conference Champions

Central Intercollegiate Athletic Association – Virginia State
Eastern Collegiate Football Conference – Stonehill
Gulf South Conference – North Alabama
Lone Star Conference – Texas A&M–Kingsville
Mid-America Intercollegiate Athletics Association – Pittsburg State
Midwest Intercollegiate Football Conference – Ferris State
North Central Conference – North Dakota
Northern California Athletic Conference – Humboldt State
Northern Sun Intercollegiate Conference – Minnesota–Duluth and Minnesota State–Moorhead
Pennsylvania State Athletic Conference – Edinboro (West) and Millersville (East)
Rocky Mountain Athletic Conference – Fort Hays State and Western State (CO)
South Atlantic Conference – Carson-Newman
Southern Intercollegiate Athletic Conference – Albany State
West Virginia Intercollegiate Athletic Conference – Glenville State and West Virginia Wesleyan

== Postseason ==
1995 NCAA Division II Football Championship
- Teams: 16
- Finals Site: Braly Municipal Stadium; Florence, AL
- Champion: North Alabama; (3rd title, title game)
- Runner-up: Pittsburg State; (3rd title game)
- Semifinalists: Ferris State; Texas A&M–Kingsville
- Winning coach: championship

The 1995 NCAA Division II Football Championship playoffs were the 22nd single-elimination tournament to determine the national champion of men's NCAA Division II college football. The championship game was held at Braly Municipal Stadium in Florence, Alabama, for the ninth time.

=== Playoff bracket ===
First round Campus sites
Ferris State	36
Millersville	26
New Haven	27
Edinboro	12
North Alabama	38
Albany State	28
Carson–Newman	37
West Georgia	26
Pittsburg State	36
Northern Colorado	17
North Dakota State	41
North Dakota	10
Texas A&M–Kingsville	59
Fort Hays State	28
Portland State	56
East Texas State	35

Quarterfinals; Campus sites
Ferris State	17
New Haven	9
North Alabama	28
Carson–Newman	7
Pittsburg State	9
North Dakota State	7
Texas A&M–Kingsville	30
Portland State	3

Semifinals; Campus sites
Ferris State	7
North Alabama	45
Pittsburg State	28*
Texas A&M–Kingsville	25

Championship; Braly Municipal Stadium; Florence, AL
North Alabama	27
Pittsburg State	7

== See also ==
- 1995 NCAA Division I-A football season
- 1995 NCAA Division I-AA football season
- 1995 NCAA Division III football season
- 1995 NAIA Division I football season
- 1995 NAIA Division II football season
