= 1995 Southern Utah Thunderbirds football team =

American college football season

1995 Southern Utah Thunderbirds football
- Conference: American West Conference
- Record: 2–9 (0–3 AWC)
- Head coach: Jack Bishop (15th season)
- Home stadium: Coliseum of Southern Utah

1995 American West Conference football standings
	Conf.					Overall
Team	W		L		T	W		L		T
Sacramento State $	3	–	0	–	0	4	–	6	–	1
Cal Poly	2	–	1	–	0	5	–	6	–	0
Cal State Northridge	1	–	2	–	0	2	–	8	–	0
Southern Utah	0	–	3	–	0	2	–	9	–	0
$ – Conference champion

The 1995 Southern Utah Thunderbirds football team was an American football team that represented Southern Utah University as a member of the American West Conference (AWC) during the 1995 NCAA Division I-AA football season. In their 15th year under head coach Jack Bishop, the team compiled an overall record of 2–9, with a mark of 0–3 in conference play, and finished fourth in the AWC.

== Schedule ==
Date	Opponent	Site	Result	Attendance	Source
September 2	Angelo State*	Coliseum of Southern Utah; Cedar City, UT	L 7–14	5,438	
September 9	Montana Tech*	Coliseum of Southern Utah; Cedar City, UT	W 26–25		
September 16	at Western State (CO)*	Mountaineer Bowl; Gunnison, CO	L 8–36	1,204	
September 23	at Idaho State*	Holt Arena; Pocatello, ID	L 14–48	7,502	
September 30	at Southwest Texas State*	Bobcat Stadium; San Marcos, TX	L 15–65	5,844	
October 7	Cal Poly	Coliseum of Southern Utah; Cedar City, UT	L 20–35		
October 14	Nebraska–Kearney*^{†}	Coliseum of Southern Utah; Cedar City, UT	W 28–21		
October 21	at Saint Mary's*	Saint Mary's Stadium; Moraga, CA	L 24–26		
October 28	at Cal State Northridge	North Campus Stadium; Northridge, CA	L 28–34	2,978	
November 4	UC Davis*	Coliseum of Southern Utah; Cedar City, UT	L 21–37	4,817	
November 11	at Sacramento State	Hornet Stadium; Sacramento, CA	L 29–53	2,318	
*Non-conference game; ^{†}Homecoming
