= 1995 Humboldt State Lumberjacks football team =

American college football season

1995 Humboldt State Lumberjacks football

NCAC champion
- Conference: Northern California Athletic Conference
- Record: 8–1–1 (4–0 NCAC)
- Head coach: Fred Whitmire (5th season)
- Home stadium: Redwood Bowl

1995 Northern California Athletic Conference football standings
| | Conf. | | | | | Overall |
| Team | W | | L | | T | W | | L | | T |
|---|---|---|---|---|---|---|---|---|---|---|
| Humboldt State $ | 4 | – | 0 | – | 0 | 8 | – | 1 | – | 1 |
| Chico State | 1 | – | 2 | – | 1 | 2 | – | 5 | – | 2 |
| Sonoma State | 0 | – | 3 | – | 1 | 0 | – | 8 | – | 1 |
$ – Conference champion

The 1995 Humboldt State Lumberjacks football team represented Humboldt State University—now known as California State Polytechnic University, Humboldt—as a member of the Northern California Athletic Conference (NCAC) during the 1995 NCAA Division II football season. Led by fifth-year head coach Fred Whitmire, the Lumberjacks compiled an overall record of 8–1–1 with a mark of 4–0 in conference play, winning the NCAC title. The team outscored its opponents 348 to 181 for the season. Humboldt State played home games at the Redwood Bowl in Arcata, California.

== Schedule ==
| Date | Opponent | Site | Result | Attendance | Source |
|---|---|---|---|---|---|
| September 2 | Montana Tech* | Redwood Bowl; Arcata, CA | W 31–10 | 1,865 | |
| September 9 | at Western Montana* | Vigilante Stadium; Dillon, MT | L 21–38 | 1,000 | |
| September 16 | at No. 6 UC Davis* | Toomey Field; Davis, CA | T 31–31 | 4,600 | |
| September 23 | Azusa Pacific* | Redwood Bowl; Arcata, CA | W 37–13 | 1,792 | |
| September 30 | Saint Mary's* | Redwood Bowl; Arcata, CA | W 38–37 | 1,750 | |
| October 7 | at Sonoma State | Cossacks Stadium; Rohnert Park, CA | W 24–13 | 1,641 | |
| October 21 | Chico State | Redwood Bowl; Arcata, CA | W 47–7 | 4,302 | |
| October 28 | Sonoma State | Redwood Bowl; Arcata, CA | W 35–7 | 3,450–3,457 | |
| November 4 | at Menlo* | Connor Field; Atherton, CA | W 53–12 | 341 | |
| November 11 | at Chico State | University Stadium; Chico, CA | W 31–13 | 2,000 | |
*Non-conference game; Rankings from NCAA Division II Football Committee Poll released prior to the game
