= Bruce Osborne =

American football player and coach (1924–2008)

Biographical details
- Born: August 27, 1924; Minersville, Utah, U.S.
- Died: November 23, 2008 (aged 84); Cedar City, Utah, U.S.

Playing career
- 1942: Utah State
- 1947–1948: BYU
- Position: Fullback

Coaching career (HC unless noted)

Football
- 1949–1952: Delta HS (UT)
- 1953: Provo HS (UT) (sophomores)
- 1954–1964: Southern Utah

Basketball
- 1953–1954: Provo HS (UT) (sophomores)

Head coaching record
- Overall: 8–5–1 (college football)

Bruce H. Osborne (August 27, 1924 – November 23, 2008) was an American football player and coach. He was head football coach at the College of Southern Utah—now known as Southern Utah University—from 1954 to 1964. Southern Utah competed as a junior college prior to 1963. Osborne played college football at Utah State Agricultural College—now known as Utah State University—and Brigham Young University (BYU).

After coaching at Delta High School in Delta, Utah, Osborne was hired in 1953 to coach the sophomore football and basketball teams at Provo High School in Provo, Utah. A year later, he was appointed the head football coach at the College of Southern Utah.

Osborne was born on August 27, 1924 in Minersville, Utah to Josiah Osborne Jr. and Lucy Murdock Osborne. He served with the South Pacific United States Marine Corps during World War II. Osborne was a member of the Church of Jesus Christ of Latter-day Saints. He died on November 23, 2008, in Cedar City, Utah.

== Head coaching record ==
=== College football ===
Year	Team	Overall	Conference	Standing	Bowl/playoffs
Southern Utah Thunderbirds (NAIA independent) (1963–1964)
1963	Southern Utah	4–2			
1964	Southern Utah	4–2–1			
Southern Utah:		8–5–1			
Total:		8–5–1			

=== Junior college football ===
Year	Team	Overall	Conference	Standing	Bowl/playoffs
Southern Utah Broncos/Thunderbirds (Intermountain Collegiate Athletic Conference) (1954–1962)
1954	Southern Utah		6–1	2nd	
1955	Southern Utah	3–5	2–4	T–4th	
1956	Southern Utah		1–5	6th	
1957	Southern Utah	5–4	4–1	2nd	
1958	Southern Utah	3–3–3	2–2–1	T–3rd	
1959	Southern Utah	3–6	3–1	T–2nd	
1960	Southern Utah	3–6	3–3	3rd	
1961	Southern Utah		0–5–1	7th	
1962	Southern Utah	3–5–1	2–1–1	3rd	
Southern Utah:			23–23–3		
Total:					
