= 1995 Boise State Broncos football team =

American college football season

1995 Boise State Broncos football
- Conference: Big Sky Conference

Ranking
- Sports Network: No. 21
- Record: 7–4 (4–3 Big Sky)
- Head coach: Pokey Allen (3rd season)
- Defensive coordinator: Tom Mason (3rd season)
- Home stadium: Bronco Stadium

1995 Big Sky Conference football standings
	Conf.					Overall
Team	W		L		T	W		L		T
No. 8 Montana $^	6	–	1	–	0	13	–	2	–	0
No. 21 Boise State	4	–	3	–	0	7	–	4	–	0
No. 22 Northern Arizona	4	–	3	–	0	7	–	4	–	0
No. 17 Idaho ^	4	–	3	–	0	6	–	5	–	0
Weber State	4	–	3	–	0	6	–	5	–	0
Idaho State	3	–	4	–	0	6	–	5	–	0
Montana State	2	–	5	–	0	5	–	6	–	0
Eastern Washington	1	–	6	–	0	3	–	8	–	0
$ – Conference champion; ^ – NCAA Division I-AA playoff participant; Rankings from The Sports Network poll

The 1995 Boise State Broncos football team represented Boise State University in the 1995 NCAA Division I-AA football season, their last season in Division I-AA. The Broncos competed in the Big Sky Conference and played their home games on campus at Bronco Stadium in Boise, Idaho. Led by third-year head coach Pokey Allen, Boise State finished the season 7–4 overall and 4–3 in conference, ranked 21st in the final regular season poll.

This was Boise State's final season as a member of the Big Sky and Division I-AA; they began play in Division I-A in the Big West Conference in 1996.

== Schedule ==
Date	Time	Opponent	Rank	Site	Result	Attendance	Source
September 9		at Utah State*	No. 5	Romney Stadium; Logan, UT	W 38–14	20,909	
September 16		Sam Houston State*	No. 3	Bronco Stadium; Boise, ID	W 38–14	23,377	
September 23	1:05 pm	at No. 6 Montana	No. 3	Washington–Grizzly Stadium; Missoula, MT	L 28–54	18,504	
September 30		Northwestern State*	No. 11	Bronco Stadium; Boise, ID	L 17–22	22,364	
October 7		No. 18 Northern Arizona	No. 19	Bronco Stadium; Boise, ID	L 13–32	21,683	
October 14		at Weber State		Wildcat Stadium; Ogden, UT	W 40–14	11,428	
October 21		No. 22 Idaho State^{†}		Bronco Stadium; Boise, ID	W 27–17	23,621	
October 28		No. 6 Portland State*	No. 25	Bronco Stadium; Boise, ID	W 49–14	18,128	
November 4	1:05 pm	Eastern Washington	No. 24	Bronco Stadium; Boise, ID	W 63–44	18,051	
November 11		Montana State	No. 23	Bronco Stadium; Boise, ID	W 35–7	23,327	
November 18	4:05 pm	at No. 25 Idaho	No. 16	Kibbie Dome; Moscow, ID (rivalry)	L 13–33	16,295	
*Non-conference game; ^{†}Homecoming; Rankings from The Sports Network Poll released prior to the game; All times are in Mountain time

== Season ==
Coming off a successful previous season of 13–2 and the runner-up in the national championship, BSU was ranked eighth in the preseason I-AA poll, and climbed to third after an opening victory at Division I-A Utah State. A three-game losing streak dropped them out of the poll by mid-season, after wide-margin losses to Montana and Northern Arizona.

After five consecutive wins, the Broncos climbed back to #16 prior to the regular season finale at rival Idaho, whom they defeated the previous year in Boise to break a twelve-game losing streak in the series. With a likely playoff berth on the line; BSU lost by twenty in the Kibbie Dome to end their season in a four-way tied for second place. Surging Idaho (6–4) was selected for the final at-large berth for the postseason, but was matched against top-ranked McNeese State in southwest Louisiana and made a quick exit.

== Allen's cancer ==
Allen had been diagnosed in December 1994 with rhabdomyosarcoma, a rare form of muscle cancer. The tumor in his upper right arm was removed in March and he underwent extensive chemotherapy and a stem-cell transplant in July at the Fred Hutchinson Center in Seattle. He returned to coach the Broncos while going through treatment, and the cancer was declared in remission in December 1995, but the doctors warned of likely recurrence.
