= 1995 Montana State Bobcats football team =

American college football season

1995 Montana State Bobcats football
- Conference: Big Sky Conference
- Record: 5–6 (2–5 Big Sky)
- Head coach: Cliff Hysell (4th season)
- Home stadium: Sales Stadium

1995 Big Sky Conference football standings
	Conf.					Overall
Team	W		L		T	W		L		T
No. 8 Montana $^	6	–	1	–	0	13	–	2	–	0
No. 21 Boise State	4	–	3	–	0	7	–	4	–	0
No. 22 Northern Arizona	4	–	3	–	0	7	–	4	–	0
No. 17 Idaho ^	4	–	3	–	0	6	–	5	–	0
Weber State	4	–	3	–	0	6	–	5	–	0
Idaho State	3	–	4	–	0	6	–	5	–	0
Montana State	2	–	5	–	0	5	–	6	–	0
Eastern Washington	1	–	6	–	0	3	–	8	–	0
$ – Conference champion; ^ – NCAA Division I-AA playoff participant; Rankings from The Sports Network poll

The 1995 Montana State Bobcats football team was an American football team that represented Montana State University in the Big Sky Conference during the 1995 NCAA Division I-AA football season. In their fourth season under head coach Cliff Hysell, the Bobcats compiled a 5–6 record (2–5 against Big Sky opponents) and finished seventh in the Big Sky.

== Schedule ==
Date	Opponent	Site	Result	Attendance	Source
September 2	at Colorado State*	Hughes Stadium; Fort Collins, CO	L 10–31	27,068	
September 9	Central Washington*	Sales Stadium; Bozeman, MT	W 34–14	8,527	
September 16	at Cal Poly*	Mustang Stadium; San Luis Obispo, CA	W 13–10	7,413	
September 23	Southwest Texas State*^{†}	Sales Stadium; Bozeman, MT	W 45–24	12,137	
September 30	at Northern Arizona	Walkup Skydome; Flagstaff, AZ	L 0–37	13,222	
October 7	No. 24 Idaho	Sales Stadium; Bozeman, MT	W 16–13	3,117	
October 14	at Idaho State	Holt Arena; Pocatello, ID	W 18–14	9,342	
October 21	Weber State	Sales Stadium; Bozeman, MT	L 7–14	4,407	
October 28	Eastern Washington	Sales Stadium; Bozeman, MT	L 10–28	4,347	
November 11	at Boise State	Bronco Stadium; Boise, ID	L 7–35	23,327	
November 18	No. 9 Montana	Sales Stadium; Bozeman, MT (rivalry)	L 33–42	15,197	
*Non-conference game; ^{†}Homecoming; Rankings from The Sports Network Poll released prior to the game
