= 1995 Eastern Washington Eagles football team =

American college football season

1995 Eastern Washington Eagles football
- Conference: Big Sky Conference
- Record: 3–8 (1–6 Big Sky)
- Head coach: Mike Kramer (2nd season)
- Home stadium: Woodward Field

1995 Big Sky Conference football standings
	Conf.					Overall
Team	W		L		T	W		L		T
No. 8 Montana $^	6	–	1	–	0	13	–	2	–	0
No. 21 Boise State	4	–	3	–	0	7	–	4	–	0
No. 22 Northern Arizona	4	–	3	–	0	7	–	4	–	0
No. 17 Idaho ^	4	–	3	–	0	6	–	5	–	0
Weber State	4	–	3	–	0	6	–	5	–	0
Idaho State	3	–	4	–	0	6	–	5	–	0
Montana State	2	–	5	–	0	5	–	6	–	0
Eastern Washington	1	–	6	–	0	3	–	8	–	0
$ – Conference champion; ^ – NCAA Division I-AA playoff participant; Rankings from The Sports Network poll

The 1995 Eastern Washington Eagles football team represented Eastern Washington University as a member of the Big Sky Conference during the 1995 NCAA Division I-AA football season. Led by second-year head coach Mike Kramer, the Eagles compiled an overall record of 3–8, with a mark of 1–6 in conference play, and finished eighth in the Big Sky.

== Schedule ==
Date	Opponent	Site	Result	Attendance	Source
September 7	at Southwest Texas State*	Bobcat Stadium; San Marcos, TX	W 34–16	6,771	
September 16	Sacramento State*	Woodward Field; Cheney, WA	W 21–18	4,872	
September 23	Portland State*	Woodward Field; Cheney, WA (rivalry)	L 6–14	4,463	
September 30	at Weber State	Wildcat Stadium; Ogden, UT	L 30–40	8,131	
October 7	No. 16 Idaho State	Woodward Field; Cheney, WA	L 7–14		
October 14	at Idaho	Kibbie Dome; Moscow ID	L 10–37	14,824	
October 21	No. 21 Northern Arizona	Woodward Field; Cheney, WA	L 16–30	3,863	
October 28	at Montana State	Reno H. Sales Stadium; Bozeman, MT	W 28–10	4,347	
November 4	at No. 24 Boise State	Bronco Stadium; Boise, ID	L 44–63	18,051	
November 11	No. 9 Montana	Woodward Field; Cheney, WA (rivalry)	L 7–63	3,272	
November 18	at Cal Poly*	Mustang Stadium; San Luis Obispo, CA	L 35–52	6,420	
*Non-conference game; Rankings from The Sports Network Poll released prior to the game
