= 1995 Idaho Vandals football team =

American college football season

1995 Idaho Vandals football

NCAA Division I-AA First Round, L 3–33 at NcNeese State
- Conference: Big Sky Conference

Ranking
- Sports Network: No. 17
- Record: 6–5 (4–3 Big Sky)
- Head coach: Chris Tormey (1st season)
- Offensive coordinator: George Yarno (1st season)
- Offensive scheme: Pro-style
- Defensive coordinator: Nick Holt (2nd season)
- Base defense: 4–3
- Home stadium: Kibbie Dome

1995 Big Sky Conference football standings
	Conf.					Overall
Team	W		L		T	W		L		T
No. 8 Montana $^	6	–	1	–	0	13	–	2	–	0
No. 21 Boise State	4	–	3	–	0	7	–	4	–	0
No. 22 Northern Arizona	4	–	3	–	0	7	–	4	–	0
No. 17 Idaho ^	4	–	3	–	0	6	–	5	–	0
Weber State	4	–	3	–	0	6	–	5	–	0
Idaho State	3	–	4	–	0	6	–	5	–	0
Montana State	2	–	5	–	0	5	–	6	–	0
Eastern Washington	1	–	6	–	0	3	–	8	–	0
$ – Conference champion; ^ – NCAA Division I-AA playoff participant; Rankings from The Sports Network poll

The 1995 Idaho Vandals football team represented the University of Idaho in the 1995 NCAA Division I-AA football season. The Vandals, led by first-year head coach Chris Tormey, were members of the Big Sky Conference and played their home games at the Kibbie Dome, an indoor facility on campus in Moscow, Idaho. Idaho finished the regular season at 6–4 and 4–3 in the Big Sky, their final season in the conference for more than two decades.

Idaho defeated rival Boise State for the thirteenth time in fourteen seasons.

Since 1978, the Vandals' football uniforms made prominent use of yellow gold (helmets, pants), which continued through this season. With the move to up Division I-A in 1996, the shade of gold was changed to metallic.

== Division I-AA playoffs ==
After a slow start, the Vandals defeated the top teams in the conference to make the I-AA playoffs for the fourth consecutive season, and the tenth time in eleven seasons under four head coaches. For the second straight year, Idaho traveled to Louisiana to play McNeese State in the first round; the Cowboys were top-ranked this year and won again, this time by thirty points. Conference champion Montana lost to Idaho in the Kibbie Dome in mid-season, then went on to win the national championship; it was the Vandals' first win over the Griz since 1990.

== Notable players and coaches ==
Junior defensive end Ryan Phillips was a four-year starter; he moved to outside linebacker as a senior in 1996, and was selected in the third round of the 1997 NFL draft by the New York Giants. He played five seasons in the NFL, including Super Bowl XXXV in January 2001.

Future Idaho head coach Nick Holt stayed on the staff as defensive coordinator. New head coach Tormey was an alumnus from Spokane who played defense for the Vandals in the mid-1970s, and was the defensive line coach under Dennis Erickson in 1982 and 1983. He had spent the previous eleven seasons at Washington in Seattle under head coaches Don James and Jim Lambright. First-year offensive coordinator George Yarno moved over from neighboring Washington State, his alma mater, where he was the offensive line coach under Mike Price.

== Schedule ==
Date	Time	Opponent	Rank	Site	Result	Attendance	Source
September 2	1:00 pm	at Oregon State*	No. 14	Parker Stadium; Corvallis, OR	L 7–14	32,024	
September 16	3:05 pm	Sonoma State*	No. 16	Kibbie Dome; Moscow ID	W 66–3	13,519	
September 30	11:07 am	at No. 24 Idaho State	No. 13	Holt Arena; Pocatello, ID (rivalry)	L 21–26	11,127	
October 7	11:05 am	at Montana State	No. 24	Reno H. Sales Stadium; Bozeman, MT	L 13–16	3,117	
October 14	3:05 pm	Eastern Washington^{†}		Kibbie Dome; Moscow, ID	W 37–10	14,824	
October 21	3:05 pm	No. 6 Montana		Kibbie Dome; Moscow, ID (Little Brown Stein)	W 55–43	14,912	
October 28	11:05 am	at Weber State		Wildcat Stadium; Ogden, UT	L 19–25	8,128	
November 4	5:05 pm	at No. 13 Northern Arizona		Walkup Skydome; Flagstaff, AZ	W 17–14	12,371	
November 11	4:35 pm	at No. 15 Northern Iowa*		UNI-Dome; Cedar Falls, IA	W 16–12	16,324	
November 18	3:05 pm	No. 16 Boise State	No. 25	Kibbie Dome; Moscow, ID (rivalry)	W 33–13	16,295	
November 25	5:00 pm	at No. 1 McNeese State*	No. 17	Cowboy Stadium; Lake Charles, LA (NCAA Division I-AA First Round)	L 3–33	15,736	
*Non-conference game; ^{†}Homecoming; Rankings from The Sports Network Poll released prior to the game; All times are in Pacific time

== Roster ==
1995 Idaho Vandals football team roster
Players			Coaches
Offense: Pos. / # / Name / Class; OT / / Spencer Folau / Sr	Defense: Pos. / # / Name / Class; DE / 96 / Ryan Phillips / Jr	Special teams: Pos. / # / Name / Class	Head coach: Chris Tormey; Coordinators/assistant coaches Legend: (C) Team captain; (S) Suspended; (I) Ineligible; Injured; Redshirt
