= 1995 Weber State Wildcats football team =

American college football season

1995 Weber State Wildcats football
- Conference: Big Sky Conference
- Record: 6–5 (4–3 Big Sky)
- Head coach: Dave Arslanian (7th season)
- Home stadium: Wildcat Stadium

1995 Big Sky Conference football standings
	Conf.					Overall
Team	W		L		T	W		L		T
No. 8 Montana $^	6	–	1	–	0	13	–	2	–	0
No. 21 Boise State	4	–	3	–	0	7	–	4	–	0
No. 22 Northern Arizona	4	–	3	–	0	7	–	4	–	0
No. 17 Idaho ^	4	–	3	–	0	6	–	5	–	0
Weber State	4	–	3	–	0	6	–	5	–	0
Idaho State	3	–	4	–	0	6	–	5	–	0
Montana State	2	–	5	–	0	5	–	6	–	0
Eastern Washington	1	–	6	–	0	3	–	8	–	0
$ – Conference champion; ^ – NCAA Division I-AA playoff participant; Rankings from The Sports Network poll

The 1995 Weber State Wildcats football team represented Weber State University as a member of the Big Sky Conference during the 1995 NCAA Division I-AA football season. Led by seventh-year head coach Dave Arslanian, the Wildcats compiled an overall record of 6–5, with a mark of 4–3 in conference play, and finished tied for second in the Big Sky.

== Schedule ==
Date	Opponent	Site	Result	Attendance	Source
August 31	at Western Michigan*	Waldo Stadium; Kalamazoo, MI	L 21–28	20,958	
September 9	at Central Michigan*	Kelly/Shorts Stadium; Mount Pleasant, MI	L 31–39		
September 16	Saint Mary's*	Wildcat Stadium; Ogden, UT	W 49–14	10,507	
September 23	Cal Poly*	Wildcat Stadium; Ogden, UT	W 53–43	9,128	
September 30	Eastern Washington	Wildcat Stadium; Ogden, UT	W 40–30	8,131	
October 7	at No. 5 Montana	Washington–Grizzly Stadium; Missoula, MT	L 22–49	14,088	
October 14	Boise State	Wildcat Stadium; Ogden, UT	L 14–40	11,428	
October 21	at No. 23 Montana State	Reno H. Sales Stadium; Bozeman, MT	W 14–7	4,407	
October 28	Idaho	Wildcat Stadium; Ogden, UT	W 25–19	8,128	
November 11	No. 17 Northern Arizona	Wildcat Stadium; Ogden, UT	W 20–14	7,133	
November 18	at Idaho State	Holt Arena; Pocatello, ID	L 25–35	7,348	
*Non-conference game; Rankings from The Sports Network Poll released prior to the game
