= 1995 Cal Poly Mustangs football team =

American college football season

1995 Cal Poly Mustangs football
- Conference: American West Conference
- Record: 5–6 (2–1 AWC)
- Head coach: Andre Patterson (2nd season)
- Home stadium: Mustang Stadium

1995 American West Conference football standings
	Conf.					Overall
Team	W		L		T	W		L		T
Sacramento State $	3	–	0	–	0	4	–	6	–	1
Cal Poly	2	–	1	–	0	5	–	6	–	0
Cal State Northridge	1	–	2	–	0	2	–	8	–	0
Southern Utah	0	–	3	–	0	2	–	9	–	0
$ – Conference champion

The 1995 Cal Poly Mustangs football team represented California Polytechnic State University, San Luis Obispo as a member of the American West Conference (AWC) during the 1995 NCAA Division I-AA football season. Led by second-year head coach Andre Patterson, Cal Poly compiled an overall record of 5–6 with a mark of 2–1 in conference play, placing second in the AWC. The team outscored its opponents 411 to 271 for the season. The Mustangs played home games at Mustang Stadium in San Luis Obispo, California.

== Schedule ==
Date	Opponent	Site	Result	Attendance	Source
September 2	Western Montana*	Mustang Stadium; San Luis Obispo, CA	W 57–3	3,722	
September 9	Idaho State*	Mustang Stadium; San Luis Obispo, CA	L 22–28	3,560	
September 16	Montana State*	Mustang Stadium; San Luis Obispo, CA	L 10–13	7,413	
September 23	at Weber State*	Wildcat Stadium; Ogden, UT	L 43–53	9,128	
October 7	at Southern Utah	Coliseum of Southern Utah; Cedar City, UT	W 35–20		
October 14	at Sonoma State*	Cossacks Stadium; Rohnert Park, CA	W 56–10	876	
October 21	Sacramento State	Mustang Stadium; San Luis Obispo, CA	L 36–37	8,047	
October 28	at Saint Mary's*	Saint Mary's Stadium; Moraga, CA	L 20–31		
November 4	Cal State Northridge	Mustang Stadium; San Luis Obispo, CA	W 49–7		
November 11	at UC Davis*	Toomey Field; Davis, CA (rivalry)	L 31–34	6,420	
November 18	Eastern Washington*	Mustang Stadium; San Luis Obispo, CA	W 52–35	6,420	
*Non-conference game
