= Battle for the Ax =

- Southern Utah Thunderbirds Utah Tech Trailblazers
- Sport: Football
- Latest meeting: October 3, 2026; Southern Utah, 46–33
- Stadiums: Eccles Coliseum (Southern Utah); Greater Zion Stadium (Utah Tech)
- Trophy: Victory Ax

Statistics
- Total meetings: 2
- All-time series: Southern Utah leads, 2-0
- Current win streak: Southern Utah, 2 (2025-present)

Locations of Southern Utah and Utah Tech

The Southern Utah–Utah Tech football rivalry, known as the Battle for the Ax, is the annual football game between Southern Utah University and Utah Tech University.

== Game results ==
Southern Utah victories	Utah Tech victories

No.	Date	Location	Winner	Score
1	October 25, 2025	St. George, UT	Southern Utah	28–7
2	October 3, 2026	St. George, UT	Southern Utah	46–33
Series: Southern Utah leads 2–0

== See also ==
- List of NCAA college football rivalry games
