= Andre Patterson (American football) =

American football coach (born 1960)

Personal information
- Born: June 12, 1960 (age 66); Camden, Arkansas, U.S.

Career information
- Position: Defensive lineman
- High school: Camden (AR) Fairview
- College: Montana

Career history
- Montana (1982) Graduate assistant; Renton High School (1983–1986) Assistant coach; Saint Monica Catholic High School (1987) Head coach; Weber State (1988) Defensive line coach; WWU (1989) Defensive coordinator; Cornell (1990–1991) Defensive line coach; Washington State (1992–1993) Defensive line coach; Cal Poly (1994–1996) Head coach; New England Patriots (1997) Defensive line coach; Minnesota Vikings (1998–1999) Defensive line coach; Dallas Cowboys (2000–2002) Defensive line coach; Cleveland Browns (2003–2004) Defensive line coach; Denver Broncos (2005–2006) Defensive line coach; Regis Jesuit High School (2007) Offensive line coach; UNLV (2008–2009) Assistant head coach / defensive line coach; UTEP (2010–2012) Defensive coordinator / defensive line coach; FIU (2013) Assistant head coach / defensive line coach; Minnesota Vikings (2014–2019) Defensive line coach; Minnesota Vikings (2020) Co-defensive coordinator / defensive line coach; Minnesota Vikings (2021) Assistant head coach / co-defensive coordinator / defensive line coach; New York Giants (2022–2025) Defensive line coach
- Coaching profile at Pro Football Reference

Andre Cornelius Patterson Sr. (born June 12, 1960) is an American football coach who most recently served as the defensive line coach for the New York Giants of the National Football League (NFL). He has previously been a defensive line coach for the Denver Broncos, Cleveland Browns, Dallas Cowboys, New England Patriots and Minnesota Vikings. Patterson was the head football coach at California Polytechnic State University from 1994 to 1996.

== College career ==
Patterson started his college football playing career at Contra Costa College from 1978 to 1980 as a defensive lineman. He then transferred to the University of Montana in 1981 before suffering a career-ending knee injury. Patterson graduated from Montana in 1983 with a bachelor's degree in secondary education.

== Coaching career ==
=== High school and college ===
Patterson started his coaching career as a graduate assistant at Montana. He then became an assistant coach at Renton High School from 1983 to 1986 and Saint Monica Catholic High School in 1987, where he also coached the varsity baseball team. He returned to the college football level in 1989 with Western Washington university as a defensive coordinator.

As head coach at Cal Poly, newly an FCS-level team, Patterson led the Mustangs to one American West Conference championship and recruited future pros including Kamil Loud and Antonio Warren. In 1997, he received his first opportunity to coach in the National Football League.

=== NFL ===
In 1997, New England Patriots head coach Pete Carroll brought Patterson in to be the defensive line coach. Patterson then became a defensive line coach for the Minnesota Vikings, Dallas Cowboys, Cleveland Browns, and Denver Broncos.

=== Return to high school level ===
In 2007, Patterson returned to coaching high school football, becoming the offensive line coach at Regis Jesuit High School, where his son was an incoming freshman.

=== Return to collegiate level ===
Patterson became an assistant head coach and defensive line coach at the University of Nevada, Las Vegas (UNLV) from 2008 to 2009. He became the defensive coordinator and defensive line coach at the University of Texas at El Paso (UTEP) from 2010 to 2012. His most recent college football stint was with Florida International University (FIU) in 2013 as an assistant head coach and defensive line coach.

=== Minnesota Vikings ===
In 2014, Patterson returned to the Minnesota Vikings as the defensive line coach under first-year head coach Mike Zimmer. Patterson led a strong defensive line in 2015, when the Vikings won their first NFC North Division title since 2009 and allowed the fifth-fewest points on defense.

Patterson was given the title of assistant head coach, along with co-defensive coordinator and defensive line coach, by the Vikings on April 14, 2021.

=== New York Giants ===
On February 10, 2022, Patterson was hired by the New York Giants to be the defensive line coach under head coach Brian Daboll.

During the 2025 NFL season, Patterson remained with the Giants as he battled prostate cancer. On January 22, 2026, Patterson was fired by the Giants following the hiring of John Harbaugh.

== Personal life ==
Patterson and his wife, Donna, have two children: Andre Jr. and Ashmera.

On December 23, 2025, it was revealed that Patterson had battled prostate cancer during the 2025 NFL season.

== Head coaching record ==
=== College ===
Year	Team	Overall	Conference	Standing	Bowl/playoffs
Cal Poly Mustangs (American West Conference) (1994–1995)
1994	Cal Poly	7–4	3–0	1st	
1995	Cal Poly	5–6	2–1	2nd	
Cal Poly Mustangs (NCAA Division I-AA independent) (1996)
1996	Cal Poly	5–6			
Cal Poly:		17–16	5–1		
Total:		17–16			
National championship Conference title Conference division title or championship game berth
