= 1995 North Dakota State Bison football team =

American college football season

1995 North Dakota State Bison football

NCAA Division II Quarterfinal, L 7–9 vs. Pittsburg State
- Conference: North Central Conference
- Record: 10–3 (7–2 NCC)
- Head coach: Rocky Hager (9th season)
- Home stadium: Fargodome

1995 North Central Conference football standings
	Conf.					Overall
Team	W		L		T	W		L		T
No. 7 North Dakota $^	8	–	1	–	0	9	–	2	–	0
No. 13 North Dakota State ^	7	–	2	–	0	10	–	3	–	0
No. 16 Northern Colorado ^	7	–	2	–	0	9	–	3	–	0
South Dakota	6	–	3	–	0	8	–	3	–	0
St. Cloud State	5	–	4	–	0	6	–	4	–	0
South Dakota State	4	–	5	–	0	6	–	5	–	0
Mankato State	3	–	6	–	0	4	–	7	–	0
Augustana (SD)	2	–	6	–	1	3	–	6	–	1
Nebraska–Omaha	2	–	7	–	0	3	–	8	–	0
Morningside	0	–	8	–	1	0	–	9	–	2
$ – Conference champion; ^ – NCAA Division II playoff participant; Rankings from NCAA Division II Football Committee poll

The 1995 North Dakota State Bison football team was an American football team that represented North Dakota State University during the 1995 NCAA Division II football season as a member of the North Central Conference. In their ninth year under head coach Rocky Hager, the team compiled a 10–3 record.

== Schedule ==
Date	Opponent	Rank	Site	Result	Attendance	Source
September 2	Delta State*	No. 10	Fargodome; Fargo, ND	W 16–13	11,003	
September 9	No. 14 Valdosta State*	No. 10	Fargodome; Fargo, ND	W 19–14	11,887	
September 16	at St. Cloud State	No. 5	Selke Field; St. Cloud, MN	L 0–34	4,896	
September 23	at Nebraska–Omaha		Al F. Caniglia Field; Omaha, NE	W 34–23	4,800	
September 30	Augustana (SD)		Fargodome; Fargo, ND	W 53–14	10,775	
October 7	No. 12 Northern Colorado^{†}	No. 19	Fargodome; Fargo, ND	W 42–38	13,193	
October 14	at South Dakota State	No. 13	Coughlin–Alumni Stadium; Brookings, SD (rivalry)	W 26–17	12,894	
October 21	at Mankato State	No. 13	Blakeslee Stadium; Mankato, MN	W 26–25	3,515	
October 28	No. 18 South Dakota	No. 8	Fargodome; Fargo, ND	W 14–7	15,005	
November 4	at No. 10 North Dakota	No. 6	Memorial Stadium; Grand Forks, ND (Nickel Trophy)	L 7–21	12,331	
November 11	Morningside	No. 13	Fargodome; Fargo, ND	W 30–7	9,275	
November 18	at No. 7 North Dakota	No. 13	Memorial Stadium; Grand Forks, ND (NCAA Division II First Round)	W 41–10	5,595	
November 25	at No. 4 Pittsburg State*	No. 13	Carnie Smith Stadium; Pittsburg, KS (NCAA Division II Quarterfinal)	L 7–9	5,800	
*Non-conference game; ^{†}Homecoming; Rankings from NCAA Division II Football Committee Poll released prior to the game
