= 1995 Cal State Northridge Matadors football team =

American college football season

1995 Cal State Northridge Matadors football
- Conference: American West Conference
- Record: 2–8 (1–2 AWC)
- Head coach: Dave Baldwin (1st season)
- Defensive coordinator: Ron Ponciano (1st season)
- Home stadium: North Campus Stadium

1995 American West Conference football standings
	Conf.					Overall
Team	W		L		T	W		L		T
Sacramento State $	3	–	0	–	0	4	–	6	–	1
Cal Poly	2	–	1	–	0	5	–	6	–	0
Cal State Northridge	1	–	2	–	0	2	–	8	–	0
Southern Utah	0	–	3	–	0	2	–	9	–	0
$ – Conference champion

The 1995 Cal State Northridge Matadors football team represented California State University, Northridge as a member of the American West Conference (AWC) during the 1995 NCAA Division I-AA football season. Led by first-year head coach Dave Baldwin, Cal State Northridge compiled an overall record of 2–8 with a mark of 1–3 in conference play, placing third in the AWC. The team was outscored by its opponents 355 to 159 for the season. The Matadors played home games at North Campus Stadium in Northridge, California.

== Schedule ==
Date	Opponent	Site	Result	Attendance	Source
September 9	Menlo*	North Campus Stadium; Northridge, CA	W 45–2	2,236	
September 16	at Idaho State*	Holt Arena; Pocatello, ID	L 0–52	6,347	
September 23	at Northern Arizona*	Walkup Skydome; Flagstaff, AZ	L 7–68	5,212	
October 7	at Southwest Texas State*	Bobcat Stadium; San Marcos, TX	L 14–43	3,814	
October 14	Western New Mexico*	North Campus Stadium; Northridge, CA	L 8–27	1,431	
October 21	at UC Davis*	Toomey Field; Davis, CA	L 8–38	6,634	
October 28	Southern Utah	North Campus Stadium; Northridge, CA	W 34–28	2,978	
November 4	at Cal Poly	Mustang Stadium; San Luis Obispo, CA	L 7–49		
November 11	Saint Mary's*	North Campus Stadium; Northridge, CA	L 20–28	2,139	
November 18	Sacramento State	North Campus Stadium; Northridge, CA	L 16–20	2,418	
*Non-conference game
