= 1995 Northern Arizona Lumberjacks football team =

American college football season

1995 Northern Arizona Lumberjacks football
- Conference: Big Sky Conference

Ranking
- Sports Network: No. 22
- Record: 7–4 (4–3 Big Sky)
- Head coach: Steve Axman (6th season)
- Home stadium: Walkup Skydome

1995 Big Sky Conference football standings
	Conf.					Overall
Team	W		L		T	W		L		T
No. 8 Montana $^	6	–	1	–	0	13	–	2	–	0
No. 21 Boise State	4	–	3	–	0	7	–	4	–	0
No. 22 Northern Arizona	4	–	3	–	0	7	–	4	–	0
No. 17 Idaho ^	4	–	3	–	0	6	–	5	–	0
Weber State	4	–	3	–	0	6	–	5	–	0
Idaho State	3	–	4	–	0	6	–	5	–	0
Montana State	2	–	5	–	0	5	–	6	–	0
Eastern Washington	1	–	6	–	0	3	–	8	–	0
$ – Conference champion; ^ – NCAA Division I-AA playoff participant; Rankings from The Sports Network poll

The 1995 Northern Arizona Lumberjacks football team represented Northern Arizona University as a member of the Big Sky Conference during the 1995 NCAA Division I-AA football season. Led by sixth-year head coach Steve Axman, the Lumberjacks compiled an overall record of 7–4, with a mark of 4–3 in conference play, and finished tied for second in the Big Sky.

== Schedule ==
Date	Opponent	Rank	Site	Result	Attendance	Source
September 2	at New Mexico*		University Stadium; Albuquerque, NM	L 21–45	24,894	
September 9	Sacramento State*		Walkup Skydome; Flagstaff, AZ	W 62–7	7,927	
September 16	Abilene Christian*	No. 25	Walkup Skydome; Flagstaff, AZ	W 62–0	6,011	
September 23	Cal State Northridge*	No. 24	Walkup Skydome; Flagstaff, AZ	W 68–7	5,212	
September 30	Montana State	No. 20	Walkup Skydome; Flagstaff, AZ	W 37–0	13,222	
October 7	at No. 19 Boise State	No. 18	Bronco Stadium; Boise, ID	W 32–13	21,683	
October 14	No. 5 Montana	No. 16	Walkup Skydome; Flagstaff, AZ	L 21–24	15,707	
October 21	at Eastern Washington	No. 21	Woodward Field; Cheney, WA	W 30–16	3,863	
October 28	at Idaho State	No. 16	Holt Arena; Pocatello, ID	W 42–14	10,153	
November 4	Idaho	No. 13	Walkup Skydome; Flagstaff, AZ	L 14–17	12,371	
November 11	at Weber State	No. 17	Wildcat Stadium; Ogden, UT	L 14–20	7,133	
*Non-conference game; Rankings from The Sports Network Poll released prior to the game
