= Jack Bishop (American football) =

American football coach and college athletics administrator

Biographical details
- Born: July 22, 1947 (age 79); Delta, Utah, U.S.
- Education: Utah State (MS, 1980)

Playing career
- 1968: Southern Utah

Coaching career (HC unless noted)
- 1970: Panguitch HS (UT) (assistant)
- 1971–1973: Wasatch HS (UT) (assistant)
- 1974–1976: Cedar HS (UT)
- 1977: Southern Utah (assistant)
- 1978–1982: Southern Utah
- 1986–1995: Southern Utah

Administrative career (AD unless noted)
- 2000–2013: Central Washington

Head coaching record
- Overall: 80–74–4 (college)

Accomplishments and honors

Championships
- 1 AWC (1993)

Jack Bishop (born July 22, 1947) is an American former football coach and college athletics administrator. He served as the head football coach at his alma mater, Southern Utah University, from 1978 to 1982 and again from 1986 to 1995, compiling a record of 80–74–4.

Bishop retired in 2013 after having served as the athletic director at Central Washington University.

== Head coaching record ==
=== College ===
Year	Team	Overall	Conference	Standing	Bowl/playoffs
Southern Utah Thunderbirds (Rocky Mountain Athletic Conference) (1978–1982)
1978	Southern Utah	7–3	5–3	T–2nd	
1979	Southern Utah	4–6	3–5	T–6th	
1980	Southern Utah	6–3	6–2	3rd	
1981	Southern Utah	7–3	6–2	T–2nd	
1982	Southern Utah	6–2–2	5–1–2	3rd	
Southern Utah Thunderbirds (Western Football Conference) (1986–1992)
1986	Southern Utah	8–3	3–3	T–4th	
1987	Southern Utah	5–6	2–4	T–5th	
1988	Southern Utah	4–7	2–4	T–5th	
1989	Southern Utah	5–5	4–2	T–2nd	
1990	Southern Utah	6–5	2–3	T–3rd	
1991	Southern Utah	7–3–1	4–1	2nd	
1992	Southern Utah	6–5	2–3	T–4th	
Southern Utah Thunderbirds (American West Conference) (1993–1995)
1993	Southern Utah	3–7–1	3–1	T–1st	
1994	Southern Utah	4–7	1–2	3rd	
1995	Southern Utah	2–9	0–3	4th	
Southern Utah:		80–74–4 (.519)	48–39–2 (.551)		
Total:		80–74–4 (.519)			
National championship Conference title Conference division title or championship game berth
