= 1995 Montana Grizzlies football team =

American college football season

1995 Montana Grizzlies football

NCAA Division I-AA national champion Big Sky champion

NCAA Division I-AA Championship Game, W 22–20 vs. Marshall
- Conference: Big Sky Conference

Ranking
- Sports Network: No. 8
- Record: 13–2 (6–1 Big Sky)
- Head coach: Don Read (10th season)
- Offensive coordinator: Mick Dennehy (5th season)
- Defensive coordinator: Jerome Souers (6th season)
- Home stadium: Washington–Grizzly Stadium

1995 Big Sky Conference football standings
	Conf.					Overall
Team	W		L		T	W		L		T
No. 8 Montana $^	6	–	1	–	0	13	–	2	–	0
No. 21 Boise State	4	–	3	–	0	7	–	4	–	0
No. 22 Northern Arizona	4	–	3	–	0	7	–	4	–	0
No. 17 Idaho ^	4	–	3	–	0	6	–	5	–	0
Weber State	4	–	3	–	0	6	–	5	–	0
Idaho State	3	–	4	–	0	6	–	5	–	0
Montana State	2	–	5	–	0	5	–	6	–	0
Eastern Washington	1	–	6	–	0	3	–	8	–	0
$ – Conference champion; ^ – NCAA Division I-AA playoff participant; Rankings from The Sports Network poll

The 1995 Montana Grizzlies football team represented the University of Montana in the 1995 NCAA Division I-AA football season. The Grizzlies were led by tenth-year head coach Don Read and played their home games on campus at Washington–Grizzly Stadium in Missoula.

Montana finished the regular season at 9–2 and 6–1 in conference to win the Big Sky title, and were eighth in the final poll at the end of the regular season. The Grizzlies won four playoff games, the first three at home, to win the Division I-AA national championship and finish at 13–2.

== Schedule ==
Date	Time	Opponent	Rank	Site	Result	Attendance	Source
September 2	1:05 pm	Eastern New Mexico*	No. 4	Washington–Grizzly Stadium; Missoula, MT	W 41–14	12,375	
September 9	3:00 pm	at Washington State*	No. 4	Martin Stadium; Pullman, WA	L 21–38	28,312	
September 16	1:05 pm	Minnesota–Duluth	No. 7	Washington–Grizzly Stadium; Missoula, MT	W 54–6	12,508	
September 23	1:05 pm	No. 3 Boise State	No. 6	Washington–Grizzly Stadium; Missoula, MT	W 54–28	18,505	
September 30	1:05 pm	UC Davis*	No. 5	Washington–Grizzly Stadium; Missoula, MT	W 41–20	11,723	
October 7	1:05 pm	Weber State	No. 5	Washington–Grizzly Stadium; Missoula, MT	W 49–22	14,088	
October 14	4:05 pm	at No. 16 Northern Arizona	No. 5	Walkup Skydome; Flagstaff, AZ	W 24–21	15,707	
October 21	3:05 pm	at Idaho	No. 6	Kibbie Dome; Moscow, ID (Little Brown Stein)	L 43–55	14,912	
November 4	12:05 pm	Idaho State	No. 10	Washington–Grizzly Stadium; Missoula, MT	W 35–21	15,490	
November 11	2:05 pm	at Eastern Washington	No. 9	Woodward Field; Cheney, WA (rivalry)	W 63–7	3,272	
November 18	12:05 pm	Montana State	No. 9	Reno H. Sales Stadium; Bozeman, MT (rivalry)	W 42–33	15,197	
November 25	12:05 pm	No. 10 Eastern Kentucky*	No. 8	Washington–Grizzly Stadium; Missoula, MT (NCAA Division I-AA First Round)	W 48–0	13,830	
December 2	12:05 pm	No. 15 Georgia Southern*	No. 8	Washington–Grizzly Stadium; Missoula, MT (NCAA Division I-AA Quarterfinal)	W 45–0	18,518	
December 9	12:05 pm	No. 5 Stephen F. Austin*	No. 8	Washington–Grizzly Stadium; Missoula, MT (NCAA Division I-AA Semifinal)	W 70–14	18,523	
December 16	12:05 pm	vs. No. 6 Marshall*	No. 8	Marshall University Stadium; Huntington, WV (NCAA Division I-AA Championship)	W 22–20	32,106	
*Non-conference game; Rankings from The Sports Network Poll released prior to the game; All times are in Mountain time

== Roster ==
1995 Montana Grizzlies football team roster
Players
Coaches
Offense

Pos.	#	Name	Class
QB	15	Dave Dickenson	Sr
OT	61	Scott Curry	Fr

Defense

Pos.	#	Name	Class
FS	34	Blaine McElmurry	Jr

Special teams

Pos.	#	Name	Class

Head coach

- Don Read

Coordinators/assistant coaches

Legend

- (C) Team captain
- (S) Suspended
- (I) Ineligible
- Injured
- Redshirt

Roster

No. 1 -- Nathan Dolan, WR, 5-foot-7, 165 pounds, jr., Billings, Montana No. 2 -- Justin Hazel, CB, 6-1, 190, jr., Fort Lauderdale, Florida No. 4 -- Mike Wilson, WR, 5-7, 160, sr., Wahiawa, Hawaii No. 5 -- Matt Wells, WR/PK, 5-9, 16-, sr., Ashland, Oregon No. 6 -- Justin Gaines, CB, 5-10, 175, fr., Niceville, Florida No. 8 -- Mike Erhardt, WR, 6-4, 205, jr., Eugene, Oregon No. 9 -- Sean Goicoechea, SS, 6-1, 205, jr., Stevensville, Montana No. 14—Ryan Palma, FS, 6-1, 205, sr., Canby, Oregon No. 15—Dave Dickenson, QB, 5-11, 175, sr., Great Falls, Montana No. 16—Brian Ah Yat, QB, 6-1, 180, fr., Honolulu, Hawaii No. 17—Josh Paffhausen, QB, 6-0, 175, so., Butte, Montana No. 19—Mike Temple, CB, 5-10, 180, sr., San Diego, California No. 21—Josh Branen, RB, 5-7, 185, so., Moscow, Idaho No. 23—Joe Douglass, WR, 6-0, 180, jr., Salem, Oregon No. 25—Trevor Utter, WR, 6-1, 180, fr., Eureka, Montana No. 26—Chase Greene, WR, 6-0, 170, sr., Deer Park, Washington No. 27—Jake Dennehy, FS, 6-0, 180, so., Missoula, Montana No. 28—Justin Olsen, WR, 5-10, 170, fr., Helena, Montana No. 30—Kelly Stensrud, RB, 6-1, 190, sr., Missoula, Montana No. 32—Dallas Neil, P, 6-3, 200, fr., Great Falls, Montana No. 33—Brian Gales, RB, 5-9, 170, fr., Richland, Washington No. 34—Blaine McElmurry, FS, 6-0, 195, jr., Troy, Montana No. 35—Mike Kowalski, OLB, 5-11, 203, sr., Cut Bank, Montana No. 37—Jason Crebo, ILB, 6-3, 225, so., Helena, Montana No. 38—Larry Tofapelli, WR, 5-11, 170, sr., Stockton, California No. 40—Chris Morton, RB, 5-10, 223, sr., San Jose, California No. 41—Mark Hampe, LB, 6-2, 224, jr., Great Falls, Montana No. 42—Mike Bouchee, LB, 6-2, 231, jr., Missoula, Montana No. 43—Randy Riley, DE, 6-3, 240, jr., Butte, Montana No. 44—Josh Remington, SS, 6-1, 195, so., Kalispell, Montana No. 45—David Sirmon, OLB, 6-1, 220, jr., Walla Walla, Washington No. 46—Greg Fitzgerald, ILB, 6-0, 222, so., Columbus, Montana No. 47—Andy Larson, PK, 6-1, 180, jr., Helena, Montana No. 48—Joe Lehman, DE, 6-3, 225, so., Coos Bay, Oregon No. 50—Yohanse Manzanerez, DE, 6-3, 267, sr., Great Falls, Montana No. 52—Dave Holt, OG, 6-1, 290, fr., Coeur d'Alene, Idaho No. 54—Randy Allik, DT, 6-2, 260, fr., Missoula, Montana No. 55—Eric Buehler, DE, 6-3, 230, fr., Butte, Montana No. 56—Eric Simonson, OT, 6-5, 290, sr., Plentywood, Montana No. 57—Troy Lucas, OG, 6-3, 260, sr., Canby, Oregon No. 58—Eric Hart, LB, 6-0, 202, so., Shenandoah, Virginia No. 60—Mike Agee, OG, 6-4, 285, jr., Kalispell, Montana No. 61—Scott Curry, OT, 6-5, 250, fr., Valier, Montana No. 62—David Kempfert, OC, 6-4, 278, jr., Missoula, Montana No. 69—Troy Casper, OT, 6-4, 260, so., Billings, Montana No. 70—Marty Duffin, DT, 6-2, 270, sr., Idaho Falls, Idaho No. 71—Bob Fenton, OG, 6-4, 270, sr., Medford, Oregon No. 73—Jeff Zellick, OG, 6-5, 290, jr., Springfield, Oregon No. 75—Jason Baker, OT, 6-7, 300, so., Coos Bay, Oregon No. 85—David Henkel, K, 5-10, 170, fr., Lake Mary, Florida No. 87—Eleu Kane, WR, 5-10, 165, fr., Honolulu, Hawaii No. 88—Raul Pacheco, WR, 5-9, 170, fr., Honolulu, Hawaii No. 89—Brian Toone, DT, 6-2, 275, jr., Butte, Montana No. 90—Corey Falls, DE, 6-2, 244, jr., Medford, Oregon No. 93—Ryan Thompson, DT, 6-4, 275, jr., Missoula, Montana No. 95—Marc Bebout, TE, 6-4, 230, sr., Riverton, Wyoming No. 97—Mike Lorentz, DE/DT, 6-4, 260, fr., Thornton, Colorado No. 98—Wade Scates, DT, 6-3, 240, so., Spokane, Washington No. 99—Eric Manzanarez, DT, 6-3, 230, fr., Great Falls, Montana
