= 1995 East Texas State Lions football team =

American college football season

1995 East Texas State Lions football

NCAA Division II First Round, L 35–56 vs. Portland State
- Conference: Lone Star Conference
- Record: 8–4 (6–1 LSC)
- Head coach: Eddie Vowell (10th season)
- Home stadium: Memorial Stadium

1995 Lone Star Conference football standings
	Conf.					Overall
Team	W		L		T	W		L		T
No. 2 Texas A&M–Kingsville $^	7	–	0	–	0	11	–	2	–	0
No. 11 East Texas State ^	6	–	1	–	0	8	–	4	–	0
No. 15 Angelo State	4	–	2	–	1	6	–	3	–	1
Central Oklahoma	4	–	3	–	0	8	–	3	–	0
Eastern New Mexico	3	–	3	–	1	6	–	4	–	1
Abilene Christian	2	–	5	–	0	4	–	7	–	0
West Texas A&M	1	–	6	–	0	5	–	6	–	0
Tarleton State	0	–	7	–	0	1	–	10	–	0
$ – Conference champion; ^ – NCAA Division II playoff participant; Rankings from NCAA Division II Football Committee poll

The 1995 East Texas State Lions football team represented East Texas State University—now known as Texas A&M University–Commerce—as a member of the Lone Star Conference (LSC) during the 1995 NCAA Division II football season. Led by tenth-year head coach Eddie Vowell, the Lions compiled an overall record of 8–4 with a mark of 6–1 in conference play, placing second in the LSC. East Texas State advanced to the NCAA Division II Football Championship playoffs, where they lost in the first round Portland State. The team played home games at Memorial Stadium in Commerce, Texas.

== Schedule ==
Date	Opponent	Rank	Site	Result	Attendance	Source
September 2	Central Arkansas*		Memorial Stadium; Commerce, TX	L 20–27	4,274	
September 9	at Harding*		Harding Stadium; Searcy, AR	W 40–0	4,500	
September 16	at Henderson State*		Carpenter–Haygood Stadium; Arkadelphia, AR	W 6–3	1,421	
September 23	at Northwestern State*		Harry Turpin Stadium; Natchitoches, LA	L 17–45	10,800	
September 30	No. 7 Central Oklahoma		Memorial Stadium; Commerce, TX	W 17–9	3,500	
October 7	at No. 3т Texas A&M–Kingsville	No. 14т	Javelina Stadium; Kingsville, TX (Chennault Cup)	L 18–37	10,000	
October 14	West Texas A&M		Memorial Stadium; Commerce, TX (East Texas vs. West Texas)	W 51–7	5,200	
October 21	at Eastern New Mexico	No. 20	Greyhound Stadium; Portales, NM	W 28–14	1,147	
October 28	Abilene Christian	No. 16	Memorial Stadium; Commerce, TX	W 31–24	8,200	
November 4	at No. 7т Angelo State	No. 13т	San Angelo Stadium; San Angelo, TX	W 24–21	3,500	
November 11	Tarleton State	No. 14	Memorial Stadium; Commerce, TX (President's Cup)	W 48–3	2,200	
November 18	at No. 9 Portland State	No. 11	Civic Stadium; Portland, OR (NCAA Division II First Round)	L 35–56		
*Non-conference game; Rankings from NCAA Division II Football Committee Poll released prior to the game

== Awards ==
=== All-Americans ===
- Kevin Mathis, Cornerback, First Team
- Daryl Anderson, Wide Receiver, Second Team
- Chris Dolan, Punter, Second Team
- David Dell, Placekicker, Second Team
- Travis Marshall, Defensive End, Third Team
- Jason Smith, Running Back, Honorable Mention

== All-Lone Star Conference ==
=== LSC Superlatives ===
- David Dell, Freshman of The Year

=== LSC First Team ===
- Daryl Anderson, Wide Receiver
- David Dell, Kicker
- Chris Dolan, Punter
- Kevin Mathis, Cornerback
- Jason Smith, Running Back

=== LSC Second Team ===
- Trent Dagen, Tight End
- Jason Hoffman, Center
- Travis Marshall, Defensive End
- Carl Walker, Defensive Line

=== LSC Honorable Mention ===
- Ralph Bennett, Offensive Tackle
- James Epps, Wide Receiver
- Chandler Evans, Quarterback
- Manuel Evans, Defensive Back
- Steve Holland, Safety
- Donnie Jones, Safety
- Derrick Kazee, Linebacker
- Michael Rose, Defensive Tackle
- Jim Suiter, Offensive Tackle
- Chris Taylor, Linebacker
- Greg Watson, Wide Receiver
- Tim Wheeler, Defensive Tackle
