= 1995 Idaho State Bengals football team =

American college football season

1995 Idaho State Bengals football
- Conference: Big Sky Conference
- Record: 6–5 (3–4 Big Sky)
- Head coach: Brian McNeely (4th season)
- Home stadium: Holt Arena

1995 Big Sky Conference football standings
	Conf.					Overall
Team	W		L		T	W		L		T
No. 8 Montana $^	6	–	1	–	0	13	–	2	–	0
No. 21 Boise State	4	–	3	–	0	7	–	4	–	0
No. 22 Northern Arizona	4	–	3	–	0	7	–	4	–	0
No. 17 Idaho ^	4	–	3	–	0	6	–	5	–	0
Weber State	4	–	3	–	0	6	–	5	–	0
Idaho State	3	–	4	–	0	6	–	5	–	0
Montana State	2	–	5	–	0	5	–	6	–	0
Eastern Washington	1	–	6	–	0	3	–	8	–	0
$ – Conference champion; ^ – NCAA Division I-AA playoff participant; Rankings from The Sports Network poll

The 1995 Idaho State Bengals football team represented Idaho State University as a member of the Big Sky Conference during the 1995 NCAA Division I-AA football season. Led by fourth-year head coach Brian McNeely, the Bengals compiled an overall record of 6–5, with a mark of 3–4 in conference play, and finished sixth in the Big Sky.

== Schedule ==
Date	Opponent	Rank	Site	Result	Attendance	Source
September 9	at Cal Poly*		Mustang Stadium; San Luis Obispo, CA	W 28–22	3,560	
September 16	Cal State Northridge*		Holt Arena; Pocatello, ID	W 52–0	6,347	
September 23	Southern Utah*		Holt Arena; Pocatello, ID	W 48–14	7,502	
September 30	No. 13 Idaho	No. 24	Holt Arena; Pocatello, ID (rivalry)	W 26–21	11,127	
October 7	at Eastern Washington	No. 16	Woodward Field; Cheney, WA	W 14–7		
October 14	Montana State	No. 15	Holt Arena; Pocatello, ID	L 14–18	9,342	
October 21	at Boise State	No. 22	Bronco Stadium; Boise, ID	L 17–27	23,621	
October 28	No. 16 Northern Arizona		Holt Arena; Pocatello, ID	L 14–42	10,153	
November 4	at No. 10 Montana		Washington–Grizzly Stadium; Missoula, MT	L 21–35	15,490	
November 11	at North Texas*		Fouts Field; Denton, TX	L 38–41	14,007	
November 18	Weber State		Holt Arena; Pocatello, ID	W 35–25	7,348	
*Non-conference game; Rankings from The Sports Network Poll released prior to the game
