= 1995 Chico State Wildcats football team =

American college football season

1995 Chico State Wildcats football
- Conference: Northern California Athletic Conference
- Record: 2–5–2 (1–2–1 NCAC)
- Head coach: Gary Hauser (7th season)
- Home stadium: University Stadium

1995 Northern California Athletic Conference football standings
	Conf.					Overall
Team	W		L		T	W		L		T
Humboldt State $	4	–	0	–	0	8	–	1	–	1
Chico State	1	–	2	–	1	2	–	5	–	2
Sonoma State	0	–	3	–	1	0	–	8	–	1
$ – Conference champion

The 1995 Chico State Wildcats football team represented California State University, Chico as a member of the Northern California Athletic Conference (NCAC) during the 1995 NCAA Division II football season. Led by Gary Hauser in his seventh and final season as head coach, Chico State compiled an overall record of 2–5–2 with a mark of 1–2–1 in conference play, placing second the NCAC. The team was outscored by its opponents 224 to 157 for the season. The Wildcats played home games at University Stadium in Chico, California.

Hauser finished his tenure as Chico State with an overall record of 24–40–3, for a .381 winning percentage.

== Schedule ==
Date	Opponent	Site	Result	Attendance	Source
September 2	at San Diego*	Torero Stadium; San Diego, CA	W 20–13	3,471	
September 9	at Saint Mary’s*	Saint Mary’s Stadium; Moraga, CA	L 20–44	2,031	
September 16	Mesa State*	University Stadium; Chico, CA	L 22–23	1,527	
September 23	at Sacramento State*	Hornet Stadium; Sacramento, CA	T 21–21	4,768	
September 30	Sonoma State	University Stadium; Chico, CA	T 21–21	1,350	
October 7	Chapman*	University Stadium; Chico, CA	L 7–10	6,200	
October 21	at Humboldt State	Redwood Bowl; Arcata, CA	L 7–47	4,302	
November 4	at Sonoma State	Cossacks Stadium; Rohnert Park, CA	W 26–14	521	
November 11	Humboldt State	University Stadium; Chico, CA	L 13–31	2,000	
*Non-conference game
