= Southern Utah Thunderbirds football =

American Football team

2026 Southern Utah Thunderbirds football team
- First season: 1963; 63 years ago
- Athletic director: Doug Knuth
- Head coach: DeLane Fitzgerald; 5th season, 25–21 (.543)
- Location: Cedar City, Utah
- Stadium: Eccles Coliseum (capacity: 8,500)
- Conference: Big Sky
- Colors: Scarlet and white
- All-time record: 248–308–10 (.447)

Conference championships
- AWC: 1993 Great West: 2010 Big Sky: 2015, 2017

Division championships
- RMAC Mountain: 1970
- Rivalries: Northern Arizona (rivalry); Weber State (rivalry); Utah Tech (rivalry)
- Website: suutbirds.com

The Southern Utah Thunderbirds football (also referred to as the SUU Thunderbirds) program is a college football team that represents Southern Utah University (SUU). With a history dating back to 1963, SUU currently competes in the NCAA Football Championship Subdivision as a member of the Big Sky Conference.

The Thunderbirds play their home games on campus at Eccles Coliseum in Cedar City, Utah, and have been led by head coach DeLane Fitzgerald since 2021.

== History ==
Southern Utah fielded its inaugural team in 1963 with Bruce Osborne as head coach, remained an NAIA independent through 1968, then became a charter member of the Rocky Mountain Athletic Conference (RMAC). The Thunderbirds were members of the RMAC from 1969 to 1985, with an overall record of 86–73–3 (.540) during that time. After 1985, Southern Utah moved to NCAA Division II and joined the Western Football Conference (WFC). While in the WFC from 1986 to 1992, the Thunderbirds' overall record was 41–34–1 (.546).

In 1993, Southern Utah moved up to Division I-AA and joined the American West Conference (AWC) as a charter member. The AWC folded after the 1995 season, and the Thunderbirds were 9–23–1 (.288) overall in those three years. They were an independent for eight years, then became a charter conference member again in 2004 with the Great West Conference (GWC).

In November 2010, Southern Utah announced its admission to the Big Sky Conference, effective in 2012.

The Thunderbirds won their first Big Sky championship in 2015, defeating Northern Arizona 49–41 in the regular season finale at Cedar City. They had an 8–3 regular season, with losses to Utah State, South Dakota State, and Portland State; their eight wins were by mostly large margins. With the success, head coach Ed Lamb joined the staff at Brigham Young in Provo and defensive coordinator Demario Warren was promoted.

In 2017, Southern Utah won their second Big Sky title, finishing the regular season at 9–2, with wins over four ranked (FCS) teams: Northern Iowa, Weber State, Eastern Washington, and NAU. The Thunderbirds earned the eighth seed in the FCS playoffs; Warren was the conference coach of the year and was a finalist for the Eddie Robinson Coach of the Year Award.

SUU joined the Western Athletic Conference (WAC), already home to regional rival Utah Tech, in 2022. After the 2022 season, the WAC fully merged its football league with that of the ASUN Conference, creating what eventually became the United Athletic Conference, and SUU accordingly moved its football team to the new league.

=== Football classifications ===
- 1963–1985: National Association of Intercollegiate Athletics
- 1986–1992: NCAA Division II
- 1993–present: NCAA Division I-AA/FCS

=== Conference affiliations ===
- Independent (1963–1968)
- Rocky Mountain Athletic Conference (1969–1985)
- Western Football Conference (1986–1992)
- American West Conference (1993–1995)
- I-AA Independent (1996–2003)
- Great West Conference (2004–2011)
- Big Sky Conference (2012–2021)
- Western Athletic Conference (2022)
- United Athletic Conference (2023–2025)
- Big Sky Conference (2026–present)

== Championships ==
=== Conference championships ===
Year	Coach	Conference	Overall record	Conference record
1993	Jack Bishop	American West Conference	3–7–1	3–1
2010	Ed Lamb	Great West Conference	6–5	4–0
2015	Ed Lamb	Big Sky Conference	8–4	7–1
2017†	Demario Warren	Big Sky Conference	9–3	7–1
Conference Championships			4	

† Co-champions

=== Division championships ===
Year	Coach	Division championship	Opponent	CG result
1970†	Tom Kingsford	RMAC Mountain	N/A lost tiebreaker to Western New Mexico	
Division Championships			1	

† Co-champions

== FCS playoff results ==
The Thunderbirds have appeared in the FCS playoffs three times with an overall record of 0–3.

Year	Round	Opponent	Result
2013	First Round	Sam Houston State	L 20–51
2015	First Round	Sam Houston State	L 39–42
2017	Second Round	Weber State	L 13–30

== Head coaches ==
Coach	Tenure	Record	Pct
Bruce Osborne	1963–1964	9–6–1	.594
Bill Reeske	1965–1966	8–8	.500
Tom Kingsford	1967–1977	49–53	.480
Jack Bishop	1978–1982; 1986–1995	80–74–4	.519
Don Conrad	1983–1985	14–14–1	.500
Rich Ellerson	1996	4–7	.364
C. Ray Gregory	1997–2002	28–38	.424
Gary Andersen	2003	4–7	.364
Wes Meier	2004–2007	10–33	.233
Ed Lamb	2008–2015	45–47	.489
Demario Warren	2016–2021	21–42	.333
DeLane Fitzgerald	2022–present	25–21	.543

== Gallery ==
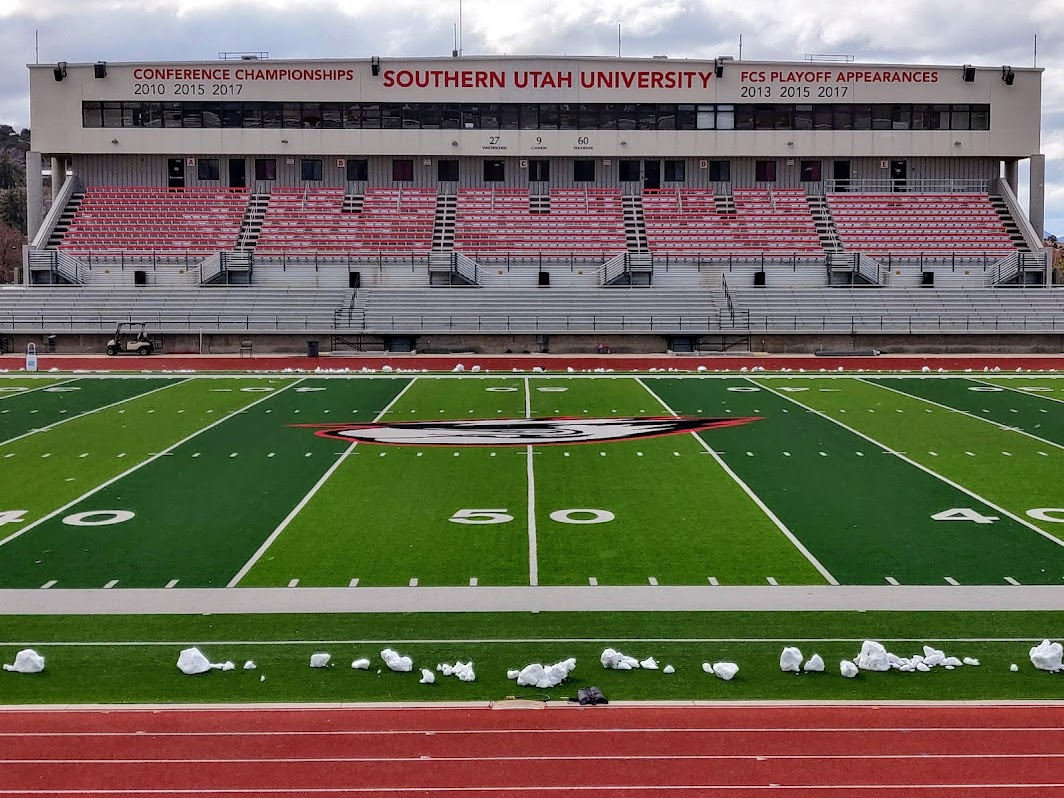
SUU Eccles Coliseum from East

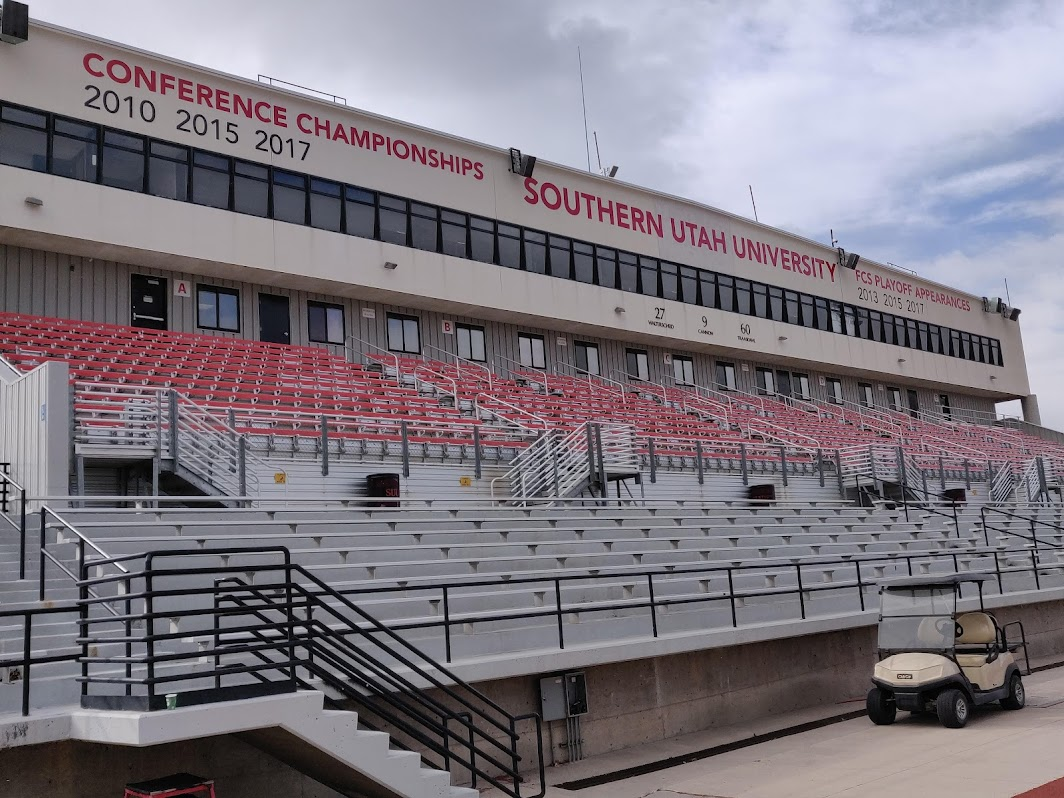
SUU Eccles Coliseum close up

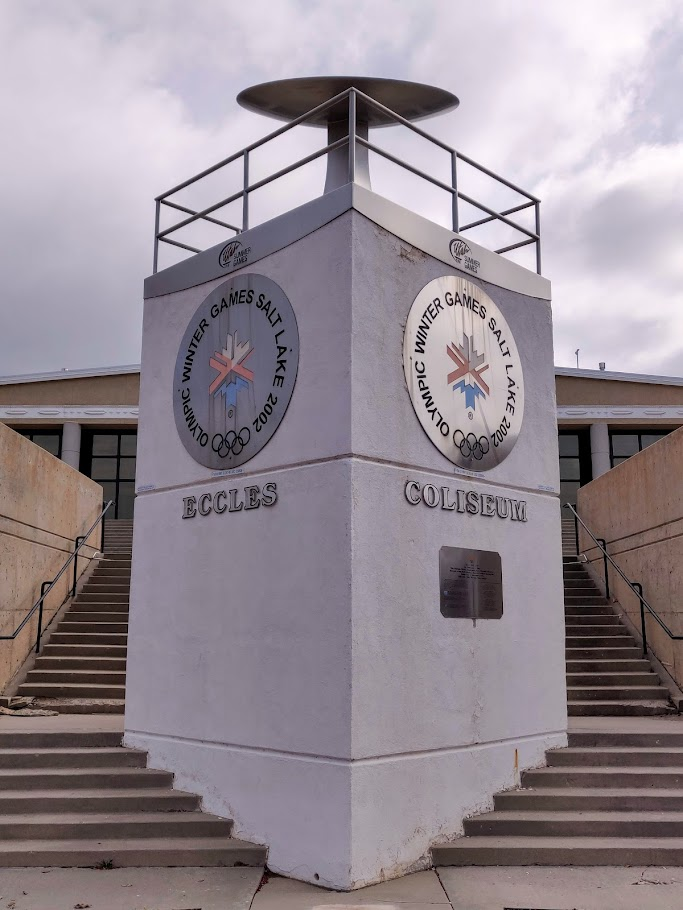
SUU Eccles Coliseum - Utah Summer Games Torch

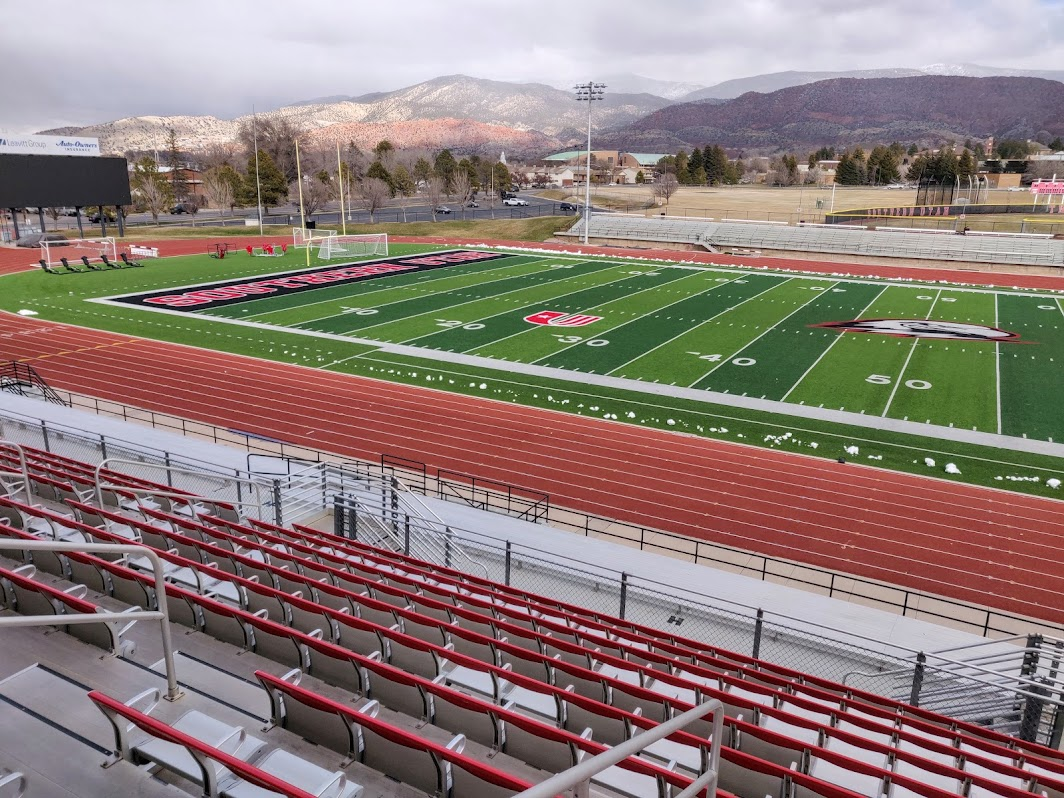
SUU Eccles Coliseum left

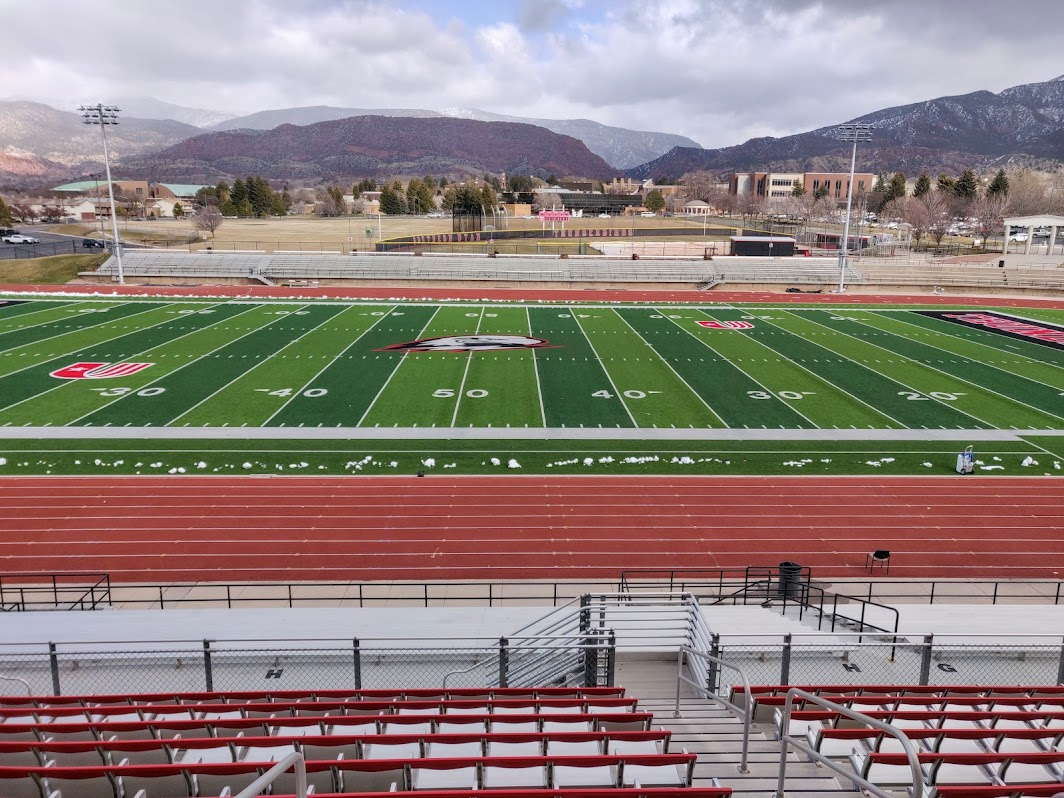
SUU Eccles Coliseum middle

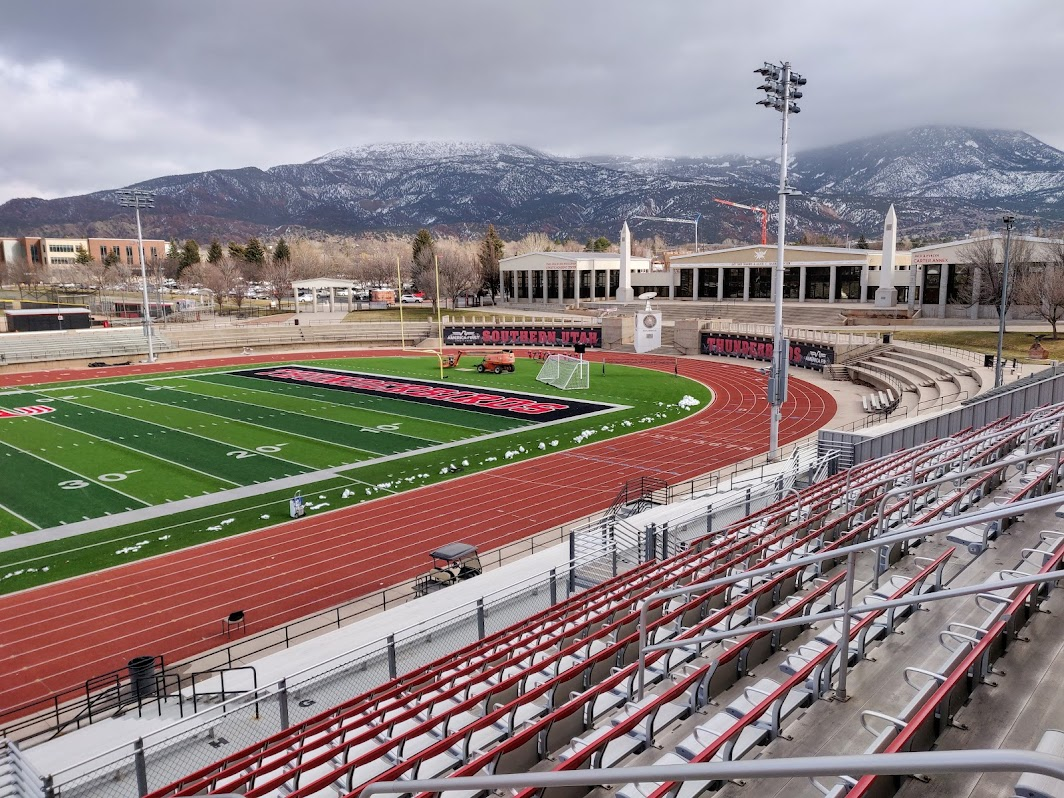
SUU Eccles Coliseum right

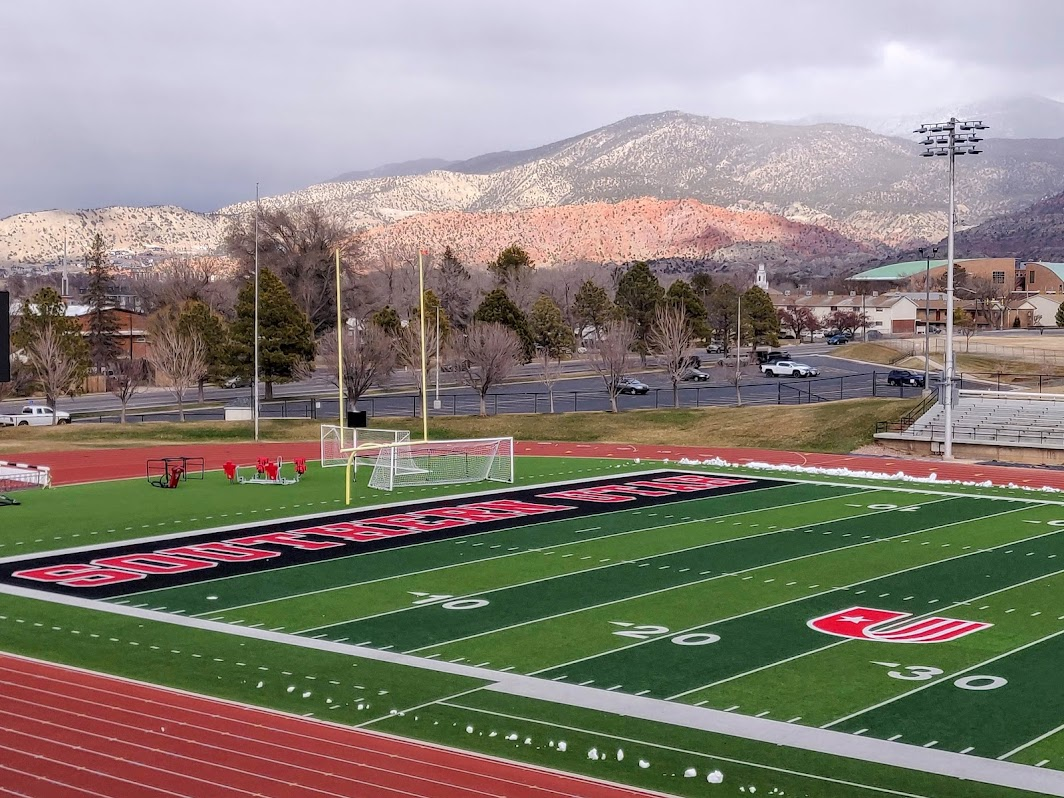
SUU Eccles Coliseum left closer

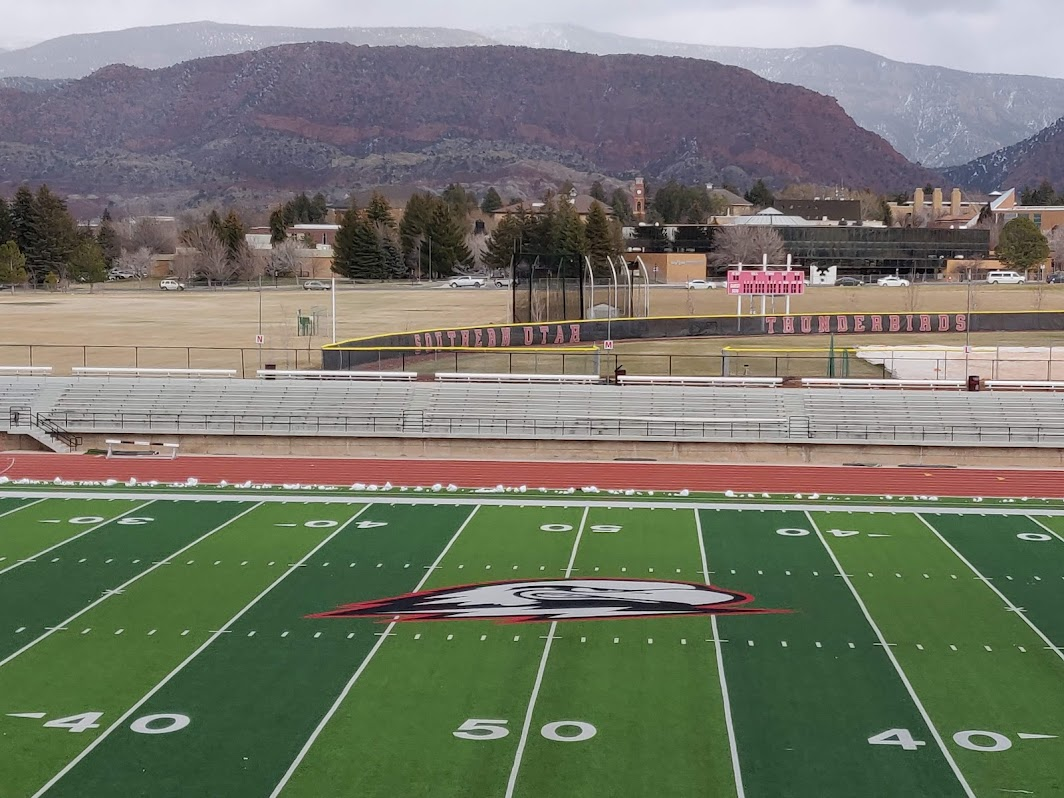
SUU Eccles Coliseum middle closer

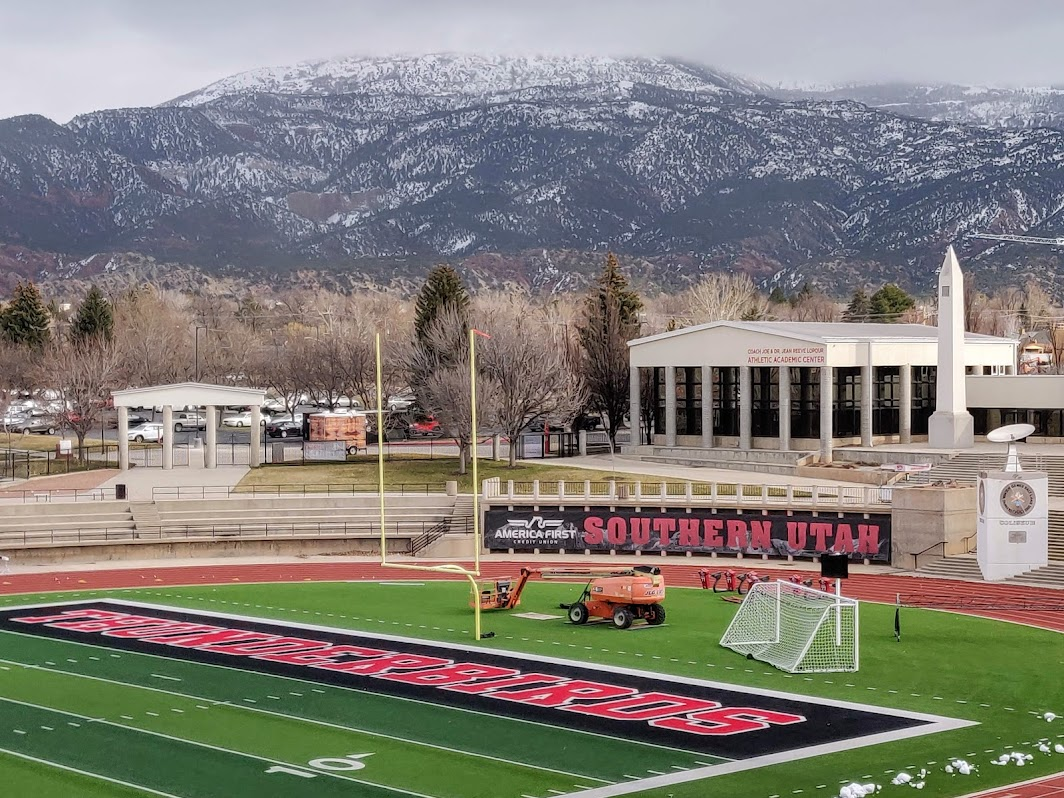
SUU Eccles Coliseum right closer

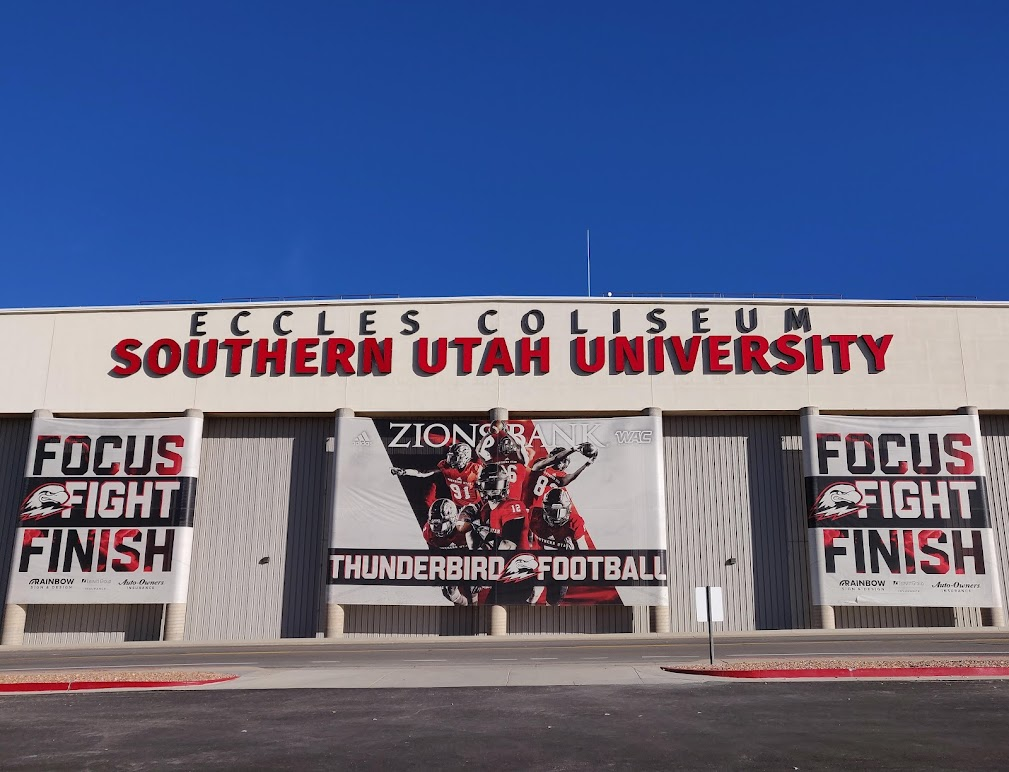
SUU Eccles Coliseum back of west side

== Future non-conference opponents ==
Announced schedules as of June 25, 2026.

2026	2027	2028	2029	2030	2031
Weber State	at Utah		at Sacramento State		at BYU
at Colorado State	at Wyoming				
at St. Thomas	San Diego				
Chicago State					
