= 1995 UC Davis Aggies football team =

American college football season

1995 UC Davis Aggies football
- Conference: Independent
- Record: 6–3–1
- Head coach: Bob Biggs (3rd season)
- Offensive coordinator: Mike Moroski (3rd season)
- Home stadium: Toomey Field

1995 NCAA Division II independents football records
| | Conf. | | | Overall |
| Team | W | L | T | W | | L | | T |
|---|---|---|---|---|---|---|---|---|
| No. 5 New Haven ^ | | – | | 10 | – | 1 | – | 1 |
| Southern Connecticut State | | – | | 8 | – | 3 | – | 0 |
| Gannon | | – | | 7 | – | 3 | – | 0 |
| Mercyhurst | | – | | 7 | – | 3 | – | 0 |
| No. 9 Portland State ^ | | – | | 8 | – | 5 | – | 0 |
| UC Davis | | – | | 6 | – | 3 | – | 1 |
| Pace | | – | | 6 | – | 4 | – | 0 |
| Wayne State (NE) | | – | | 6 | – | 4 | – | 0 |
| Kentucky Wesleyan | | – | | 5 | – | 5 | – | 0 |
| Western New Mexico | | – | | 4 | – | 5 | – | 0 |
| Albany | | – | | 3 | – | 7 | – | 0 |
| American International | | – | | 2 | – | 8 | – | 0 |
^ – NCAA Division II playoff participant; Rankings from NCAA Division II Football Committee poll

The 1995 UC Davis football team represented the University of California, Davis as an independent during the 1994 NCAA Division II football season. Led by third-year head coach Bob Biggs, UC Davis compiled a record 6–3–1. 1995 was the 26th consecutive winning season for the Aggies. The team their opponents 332 to 250 for the season. The Aggies played home games at Toomey Field in Davis, California.

== Schedule ==
| Date | Opponent | Rank | Site | Result | Attendance | Source |
|---|---|---|---|---|---|---|
| September 9 | Western State (CO) | | Toomey Field; Davis, CA | W 48–3 | 4,709 | |
| September 16 | Humboldt State | No. 6 | Toomey Field; Davis, CA | T 31–31 | 4,600 | |
| September 23 | Sonoma State | | Toomey Field; Davis, CA | W 35–0 | 5,435–6,300 | |
| September 30 | at Montana | | Washington–Grizzly Stadium; Missoula, MT | L 20–41 | 11,723 | |
| October 7 | at No. 14 Portland State | No. 20 | Civic Stadium; Portland, OR | L 13–40 | 11,587 | |
| October 14 | at Saint Mary's | | Saint Mary's Stadium; Moraga, CA | L 24–33 | 4,194 | |
| October 21 | Cal State Northridge | | Toomey Field; Davis, CA | W 38–8 | 6,634 | |
| October 28 | at Sacramento State | | Hornet Stadium; Sacramento, CA (Causeway Classic) | W 52–42 | 10,648 | |
| November 4 | at Southern Utah | | Eccles Coliseum; Cedar City, UT | W 37–21 | 4,817 | |
| November 11 | Cal Poly | | Toomey Field; Davis, CA (rivalry) | W 34–31 | 6,420 | |
Rankings from NCAA Division II Football Committee Poll released prior to the game
