= Delta High School (Utah) =

Coordinates: 39°21′30″N 112°34′32″W

Location
- 50 W 300 N Delta, Utah 84624

Information
- Type: Public
- School district: Millard County School District
- Principal: Robert Fowles
- Teaching staff: 27.49 (FTE)
- Grades: 9–12
- Enrollment: 592 (2023-2024)
- Student to teacher ratio: 21.54
- Colors: red, white, and gray
- Athletics conference: 2A, Region 12
- Mascot: Rabbit

Delta High School is a high school in Delta, Utah, United States.

== Athletics ==
Delta High is known for its mascot, the Rabbit, and for its state record of 34 state wrestling championships. Its colors are red and white. It competes in 3A, Region 15. The Delta Palladium on the Delta High campus is a well-known high school gymnasium in Utah. The student section was nicknamed "The Rabbit Pack" in 2015. Delta High School enjoys a heated rivalry with the neighboring Millard High School of Fillmore, Utah.

== State championships by sport ==
- Wrestling - 34
- Football - 9
- Volleyball - 8
- Boys' track - 7
- Boys' golf - 3
- Boys' water polo - 1
- Boys' basketball - 1
- Girls' basketball - 3
- Girls' track - 1
- Softball - 1

== State championships by year ==
- 1929-30 = boys' basketball (Hinckley High)
- 1938-39 = football
- 1952-53 = track
- 1954-55 = Wrestling
- 1955-56 = wrestling
- 1960-61 = wrestling
- 1962-63 = wrestling
- 1963-64 = wrestling
- 1964-65 = wrestling
- 1965-66 = wrestling
- 1966-67 = football, wrestling
- 1968-69 = football
- 1971-72 = boys' basketball
- 1972-73 = track
- 1973-74 = track, wrestling
- 1974-75 = wrestling
- 1975-76 = football, track, wrestling
- 1976-77 = track, wrestling
- 1977-78 = wrestling
- 1978-79 = wrestling
- 1979-80 = wrestling
- 1980-81 = wrestling
- 1981-82 = volleyball
- 1982-83 = volleyball
- 1984-85 = volleyball, wrestling
- 1985-86 = football, volleyball, wrestling
- 1986-87 = football, girls' basketball, volleyball, wrestling
- 1987-88 = wrestling
- 1988-89 = wrestling
- 1989-90 = volleyball, wrestling
- 1990-91 = wrestling
- 1991-92 = football, wrestling
- 1992-93 = softball, track, volleyball, wrestling
- 1995-96 = football, girls' track, volleyball
- 1996-97 = track
- 1998-99 = boys' water polo
- 1999-00 = boys' golf
- 2000-01 = boys' golf
- 2001-02 = boys' golf, football, wrestling
- 2008-09 = wrestling
- 2009-10 = wrestling
- 2010-11 = wrestling
- 2011-12 = wrestling
- 2012-13 = wrestling
- 2013-14 = girls' golf, wrestling
- 2014-15 = girls' basketball, wrestling
- 2015-16 = girls' basketball, volleyball
- 2021-22 = marching band

== Wrestling ==
Delta is well-known for its wrestling program and is ranked second in the nation for state championships.

== See also ==
- List of high schools in Utah
