= 1995 NCAA Division II football rankings =

The 1995 NCAA Division II football rankings are from the NCAA Division II football committee. This is for the 1995 season.

== Legend ==
	Increase in ranking
	Decrease in ranking
	Not ranked previous week
(#–#)	Win–loss record
(Italics)	Number of first place votes
т	Tied with team above or below also with this symbol

== NCAA Division II Football Committee poll ==
	Preseason	Week 1 Sept 12	Week 2 Sept 19	Week 3 Sept 26	Week 4 Oct 3	Week 5 Oct 10	Week 6 Oct 17	Week 7 Oct 24	Week 8 Oct 31	Week 9 Nov 7	
1.	North Alabama (4)	North Alabama (2–0) (4)	North Alabama (2–0) (4)	North Alabama (3–0) (4)	North Alabama (4–0) (4)	North Alabama (5–0) (4)	North Alabama (5–0) (4)	North Alabama (7–0) (4)	North Alabama (8–0) (4)	North Alabama (9–0) (4)	1.
2.	Texas A&M–Kingsville	Texas A&M–Kingsville (1–0)	Texas A&M–Kingsville (2–0)	North Dakota (3–0)	North Dakota (4–0)	North Dakota (5–0)	North Dakota (6–0)	Texas A&M–Kingsville (6–1)	Texas A&M–Kingsville (7–1)	Texas A&M–Kingsville (8–1)	2.
3.	North Dakota	North Dakota (1–0)	North Dakota (2–0)	New Haven (4–0)	New Haven (4–0) т	Texas A&M–Kingsville (4–1)	Texas A&M–Kingsville (5–1)	Ferris State (7–0)	Ferris State (8–0)	Ferris State (9–0)	3.
4.	IUP т (Note: In the actual printed polls, IUP was listed as Indiana (PA))	Ferris State (1–0)	Ferris State (2–0)	Texas A&M–Kingsville (2–1)	Texas A&M–Kingsville (3–1) т	Ferris State (5–0)	Ferris State (6–0)	Pittsburg State (6–0–1)	Pittsburg State (7–0–1)	Pittsburg State (8–0–1)	4.
5.	Portland State т	North Dakota State (2–0)	New Haven (3–0)	Ferris State (3–0)	Ferris State (4–0)	Pittsburg State (4–0–1)	Pittsburg State (5–0–1)	New Haven (6–0–1)	New Haven (7–0–1)	New Haven (8–0–1)	5.
6.	Pittsburg State	UC Davis (1–0)	Savannah State (3–0)	Pittsburg State (2–0–1)	Pittsburg State (3–0–1)	New Haven (4–0–1)	Albany State (5–1) т	Portland State (5–3)	North Dakota State (8–1)	Carson–Newman (8–2)	6.
7.	Albany State	New Haven (2–0) т	Pittsburg State (1–0–1)	Central Oklahoma (4–0)	Carson–Newman (4–1)	Albany State (5–1)	New Haven (5–0–1) т	IUP (6–2)	Angelo State (6–1–1) т	North Dakota (8–1)	7.
8.	Carson–Newman	Savannah State (2–0) т	Central Oklahoma (3–0)	Carson–Newman (3–1)	Angelo State (3–1)	Portland State (4–2)	IUP (5–2) т	North Dakota State (7–1)	Carson–Newman (7–2) т	Edinboro (8–1)	8.
9.	Ferris State	Angelo State (2–0)	Carson–Newman (2–1)	West Texas A&M (4–0)	Albany State (4–1)	IUP (4–2)	Portland State (4–3) т	Carson–Newman (6–2)	Edinboro (7–1)	Portland State (6–4)	9.
10.	North Dakota State	Pittsburg State (0–0–1)	South Dakota (3–0)	St. Cloud State (3–0)	IUP (3–2)	Angelo State (3–1–1)	Angelo State (4–1–1)	Angelo State (5–1–1)	North Dakota (7–1)	Virginia State (8–1)	10.
11.	Central Arkansas т	Virginia State (2–0)	Angelo State (2–1)	Albany State (3–1)	Central Arkansas (4–1)	St. Cloud State (4–1)	St. Cloud State (5–1)	North Dakota (6–1)	Portland State (5–4)	East Texas State (7–3)	11.
12.	Western State (CO) т	Portland State (1–1)	Albany State (2–1) т	Grand Valley State (3–1)	Northern Colorado (3–1)	Mars Hill (5–1)	Carson–Newman (5–2)	Edinboro (6–1)	Virginia State (8–1)	Albany State (8–2)	12.
13.	Grand Valley State	IUP (1–1)	Grand Valley State (2–1) т	Angelo State (2–1) т	Millersville (4–0)	North Dakota State (5–1)	North Dakota State (6–1)	Virginia State (7–1)	Albany State (7–2) т	North Dakota State (8–2)	13.
14.	Valdosta State	Carson–Newman (1–1)	Millersville (2–0)	Millersville (3–0) т	Missouri Western State (4–0–1) т	Carson–Newman (4–2)	Edinboro (5–1)	Grand Valley State (6–2) т	East Texas State (6–3) т	Millersville (8–0–1)	14.
15.	Millersville	Central Missouri State (1–0)	St. Cloud State (2–0)	Central Arkansas (3–1)	Portland State (3–2) т	Grand Valley State (4–2)	Eastern New Mexico (5–1–1)	Albany State (6–2) т	Millersville (7–0–1)	Angelo State (6–2–1)	15.
16.	Eastern New Mexico	Millersville (1–0) т	South Dakota State (2–0)	Missouri Western State (3–0–1)	East Texas State (3–2) т	Eastern New Mexico (4–1–1)	Grand Valley State (5–2)	East Texas State (5–3)	Grand Valley State (7–2)	Northern Colorado (8–2)	16.
17.	Central Missouri State	Albany State (1–1) т	Central Arkansas (2–1)	IUP (2–2)	South Dakota (4–1) т	Central Oklahoma (5–1)	Elizabeth City State (6–1)	Northern Colorado (6–2)	Northern Colorado (7–2) т	West Georgia (7–2)	17.
18.	Mankato State	Fort Hays State (1–0–1)	West Texas A&M (3–0)	Northern Colorado (3–1) т	Mars Hill (4–1)	Edinboro (4–1)	Missouri Western State (5–1–1)	South Dakota (6–2) т	West Georgia (5–2) т	Fort Hays State (8–1–1)	18.
19.	Angelo State т	South Dakota (2–0)	Wayne State (MI) (3–0)	Portland State (2–2) т	North Dakota State (4–1)	Missouri Southern State (4–1)	Virginia State (6–1)	West Georgia (5–2) т	Fort Hays State (7–1–1)	IUP (7–3)	19.
20.	New Haven т	Grand Valley State (1–1)	Elizabeth City State (3–0)	Savannah State (3–1)	UC Davis (2–1–1)	Elizabeth City State (5–1)	East Texas State (4–3)	Eastern New Mexico (5–2–1)	St. Cloud State (6–2)	Missouri Western State (7–2–1)	20.
	Preseason	Week 1 Sept 12	Week 2 Sept 19	Week 3 Sept 26	Week 4 Oct 3	Week 5 Oct 10	Week 6 Oct 17	Week 7 Oct 24	Week 8 Oct 31	Week 9 Nov 7	
		Dropped: 11 Central Arkansas; 12 Western State (CO); 14 Valdosta State; 16 Eastern New Mexico; 18 Mankato State	Dropped: 5 North Dakota State; 6 UC Davis; 11 Virginia State; 12 Portland State; 13 IUP; 15 Central Missouri State; 18 Fort Hays State	Dropped: 10 South Dakota; 16 South Dakota State; 19 Wayne State (MI); 20 Elizabeth City State	Dropped: 7 Central Oklahoma; 9 West Texas A&M; 10 St. Cloud State; 12 Grand Valley State; 20 Savannah State	Dropped: 11 Central Arkansas; 12 Northern Colorado; 13 Millersville; 14 Missouri Western State; 16 East Texas State; 17 South Dakota; 20 UC Davis	Dropped: 12 Mars Hill; 17 Central Oklahoma; 19 Missouri Southern State	Dropped: 11 St. Cloud State; 17 Elizabeth City State; 18 Missouri Western State	Dropped: 7 IUP; 18 South Dakota; 20 Eastern New Mexico	Dropped: 16 Grand Valley State; 20 St. Cloud State	
