= 1995 Morehead State Eagles football team =

American college football season

1995 Morehead State Eagles football
- Conference: Ohio Valley Conference
- Record: 2–8 (1–7 OVC)
- Head coach: Matt Ballard (2nd season)
- Home stadium: Jayne Stadium

1995 Ohio Valley Conference football standings
	Conf.					Overall
Team	W		L		T	W		L		T
No. 4 Murray State $^	8	–	0	–	0	11	–	1	–	0
No. 10 Eastern Kentucky ^	7	–	1	–	0	9	–	3	–	0
No. 25 Middle Tennessee	6	–	2	–	0	7	–	4	–	0
Southeast Missouri State	5	–	3	–	0	5	–	6	–	0
Tennessee–Martin	4	–	4	–	0	5	–	6	–	0
Austin Peay	2	–	6	–	0	3	–	8	–	0
Tennessee Tech	2	–	6	–	0	3	–	8	–	0
Morehead State	1	–	7	–	0	2	–	8	–	0
Tennessee State	1	–	7	–	0	2	–	9	–	0
$ – Conference champion; ^ – NCAA Division I-AA playoff participant; Rankings from The Sports Network poll

The 1995 Morehead State Eagles football team represented Morehead State University as a member of the Ohio Valley Conference (OVC) during the 1995 NCAA Division I-AA football season. Led by second-year head coach Matt Ballard, the Eagles compiled an overall record of 2–8, with a mark of 1–7 in conference play, and finished tied for eighth in the OVC.

== Schedule ==
Date	Opponent	Site	Result	Attendance	Source
September 7	Kentucky Wesleyan*	Jayne Stadium; Morehead, KY	W 36–11	5,000	
September 16	Middle Tennessee	Jayne Stadium; Morehead, KY	L 0–42		
September 23	Tennessee–Martin	Jayne Stadium; Morehead, KY	L 24–49		
September 30	Charleston Southern*	Jayne Stadium; Morehead, KY	L 22–34	3,000	
October 7	at Tennessee State	Hale Stadium; Nashville, TN	L 14–45	5,811	
October 14	at No. 11 Murray State	Roy Stewart Stadium; Murray, KY	L 13–63		
October 21	Tennessee Tech	Jayne Stadium; Morehead, KY	L 29–36	5,000	
October 28	Austin Peay	Jayne Stadium; Morehead, KY	W 26–13		
November 4	at Southeast Missouri State	Houck Stadium; Cape Girardeau, MO	L 12–21		
November 18	at No. 10 Eastern Kentucky	Roy Kidd Stadium; Richmond, KY (rivalry)	L 10–41		
*Non-conference game; Rankings from The Sports Network Poll released prior to the game
