= 1995 Indiana State Sycamores football team =

American college football season

1995 Indiana State Sycamores football
- Conference: Gateway Football Conference

Ranking
- Sports Network: No. 24
- Record: 7–4 (3–3 Gateway)
- Head coach: Dennis Raetz (16th season)
- Offensive coordinator: Marty Fine (2nd season)
- Defensive coordinator: Tim McGuire (4th season)
- Home stadium: Memorial Stadium

1995 Gateway Football Conference standings
	Conf.					Overall
Team	W		L		T	W		L		T
No. 12 Eastern Illinois +^	5	–	1	–	0	10	–	2	–	0
No. 18 Northern Iowa +^	5	–	1	–	0	8	–	5	–	0
No. 24 Indiana State	3	–	3	–	0	7	–	4	–	0
Illinois State	3	–	3	–	0	5	–	6	–	0
Southern Illinois	2	–	4	–	0	5	–	6	–	0
Western Illinois	2	–	4	–	0	4	–	7	–	0
Southwest Missouri State	1	–	5	–	0	4	–	7	–	0
$ – Conference champion; ^ – NCAA Division I-AA playoff participant; Rankings from The Sports Network poll

The 1995 Indiana State Sycamores football team represented Indiana State University as a member of the Gateway Football Conference during the 1995 NCAA Division I-AA football season. Led by 16th-year head coach Dennis Raetz, the Sycamores compiled an overall record of 7–4 with a mark of 3–3 in conference play, tying for third place in the Gateway. Indiana State played home games at Memorial Stadium in Terre Haute, Indiana.

Three Sycamores were named All-American after the season. Dan Brandenburg, defensive end was selected to the first team by The Sporting News and American Football Coaches Association; he was a third team pick by the Associated Press. Placekicker Tom Allison and linebacker Chris Libaire were named by Don Hansen's Football Guide to its and first and second teams, respectively. Brandenburg was selected in the seventh round of the 1996 NFL draft by the Buffalo Bills and spent five seasons career in the National Football League (NFL), four with the Bills before a short stint on the practice squad of the Philadelphia Eagles.

== Schedule ==
Date	Time	Opponent	Rank	Site	Result	Attendance	Source
August 31	6:30 pm	Mars Hill*		Memorial Stadium; Terre Haute, IN	W 31–0	3,000	
September 9	6:00 pm	at Ole Miss*		Vaught–Hemingway Stadium; Oxford, MS	L 10–56	22,642	
September 16	6:00 pm	Glenville State*		Memorial Stadium; Terre Haute, IN	W 41–14	3,729	
September 23	6:00 pm	No. 23 Western Illinois		Memorial Stadium; Terre Haute, IN	W 30–13	4,517	
September 30	6:00 pm	Southern Illinois		Memorial Stadium; Terre Haute, IN	W 52–3	4,601	
October 7	1:30 pm	at Southwest Missouri State		Plaster Sports Complex; Springfield, MO	W 16–9	11,614	
October 14	1:30 pm	at Northern Iowa	No. 23	UNI-Dome; Cedar Falls, IA	L 10–27	9,869	
October 21	2:00 pm	Western Kentucky*^{†}		Memorial Stadium; Terre Haute, IN	W 27–6	6,142	
October 28	1:00 pm	at Youngstown State*	No. 22	Stambaugh Stadium; Youngstown, OH	W 13–6	10,286	
November 11	2:30 pm	at Illinois State	No. 14	Hancock Stadium; Normal, IL	L 0–25	4,175	
November 18	1:30 pm	No. 12 Eastern Illinois	No. 19	Memorial Stadium; Terre Haute, IN	L 6–27	4,023	
*Non-conference game; ^{†}Homecoming; Rankings from The Sports Network Poll released prior to the game; All times are in Eastern time

== Roster ==
1995 Indiana State Sycamores football team roster
Players
Coaches
Offense

Pos.	#	Name	Class
QB	10	Kevin Cox	Sr
TE	83	Larry Gauer	Sr
FB	39	Craig Hook	Jr
C	76	Alec Sitz	Jr
OT	77	Brian Sitz	Fr

Defense

Pos.	#	Name	Class
DE	48	Dan Brandenburg	Sr

Special teams

Pos.	#	Name	Class

Head coach

- Dennis Raetz

Coordinators/assistant coaches

Legend

- (C) Team captain
- (S) Suspended
- (I) Ineligible
- Injured
- Redshirt
