= 1995 Tennessee State Tigers football team =

American college football season

1995 Tennessee State Tigers football
- Conference: Ohio Valley Conference
- Record: 2–9 (1–7 OVC)
- Head coach: Bill Davis (3rd season)
- Home stadium: Hale Stadium

1995 Ohio Valley Conference football standings
| | Conf. | | | | | Overall |
| Team | W | | L | | T | W | | L | | T |
|---|---|---|---|---|---|---|---|---|---|---|
| No. 4 Murray State $^ | 8 | – | 0 | – | 0 | 11 | – | 1 | – | 0 |
| No. 10 Eastern Kentucky ^ | 7 | – | 1 | – | 0 | 9 | – | 3 | – | 0 |
| No. 25 Middle Tennessee | 6 | – | 2 | – | 0 | 7 | – | 4 | – | 0 |
| Southeast Missouri State | 5 | – | 3 | – | 0 | 5 | – | 6 | – | 0 |
| Tennessee–Martin | 4 | – | 4 | – | 0 | 5 | – | 6 | – | 0 |
| Austin Peay | 2 | – | 6 | – | 0 | 3 | – | 8 | – | 0 |
| Tennessee Tech | 2 | – | 6 | – | 0 | 3 | – | 8 | – | 0 |
| Morehead State | 1 | – | 7 | – | 0 | 2 | – | 8 | – | 0 |
| Tennessee State | 1 | – | 7 | – | 0 | 2 | – | 9 | – | 0 |
$ – Conference champion; ^ – NCAA Division I-AA playoff participant; Rankings from The Sports Network poll

The 1995 Tennessee State Tigers football team represented Tennessee State University as a member of the Ohio Valley Conference (OVC) during the 1995 NCAA Division I-AA football season. Led by third-year head coach Bill Davis, the Tigers compiled an overall record of 2–9, with a conference record of 1–7, and finished tied for seventh in the OVC.

== Schedule ==
| Date | Time | Opponent | Site | Result | Attendance | Source |
|---|---|---|---|---|---|---|
| September 2 | | at Middle Tennessee | Johnny "Red" Floyd Stadium; Murfreesboro, TN | L 7–11 | 17,000 | |
| September 9 | | vs. Jackson State* | Liberty Bowl Memorial Stadium; Memphis, TN (Southern Heritage Classic) | L 18–24 | 48,533 | |
| September 23 | 6:00 p.m. | vs. Florida A&M* | Florida Citrus Bowl; Orlando, FL (Orlando Weekend Classic) | L 7–24 | 20,079 | |
| September 30 | | vs. South Carolina State* | Georgia Dome; Atlanta, GA (Atlanta Football Classic) | W 15–14 | 52,387 | |
| October 7 | | Morehead State | Hale Stadium; Nashville, TN | W 45–14 | 5,811 | |
| October 14 | | at Tennessee–Martin | Pacer Stadium; Martin, TN | L 7–28 | | |
| October 21 | | at Austin Peay | Governors Stadium; Clarksville, TN | L 6–28 | 6,714 | |
| October 28 | | No. 6 Eastern Kentucky | Hale Stadium; Nashville, TN | L 20–56 | 2,716 | |
| November 4 | | Tennessee Tech^{†} | Hale Stadium; Nashville, TN | L 24–28 | 16,128 | |
| November 11 | | No. 5 Murray State | Hale Stadium; Nashville, TN | L 19–24 | 2,115 | |
| November 18 | | at Southeast Missouri State | Houck Stadium; Cape Girardeau, MO | L 24–41 | | |
*Non-conference game; ^{†}Homecoming; Rankings from The Sports Network Poll released prior to the game; All times are in Central time
