= 1995 Southern Illinois Salukis football team =

American college football season

1995 Southern Illinois Salukis football
- Conference: Gateway Football Conference
- Record: 5–6 (2–4 Gateway)
- Head coach: Shawn Watson (2nd season)
- Home stadium: McAndrew Stadium

1995 Gateway Football Conference standings
	Conf.					Overall
Team	W		L		T	W		L		T
No. 12 Eastern Illinois +^	5	–	1	–	0	10	–	2	–	0
No. 18 Northern Iowa +^	5	–	1	–	0	8	–	5	–	0
No. 24 Indiana State	3	–	3	–	0	7	–	4	–	0
Illinois State	3	–	3	–	0	5	–	6	–	0
Southern Illinois	2	–	4	–	0	5	–	6	–	0
Western Illinois	2	–	4	–	0	4	–	7	–	0
Southwest Missouri State	1	–	5	–	0	4	–	7	–	0
$ – Conference champion; ^ – NCAA Division I-AA playoff participant; Rankings from The Sports Network poll

The 1995 Southern Illinois Salukis football team represented Southern Illinois University as a member of the Gateway Football Conference during the 1995 NCAA Division I-AA football season. They were led by second-year head coach Shawn Watson and played their home games at McAndrew Stadium in Carbondale, Illinois. The Salukis finished the season with a 5–6 record overall and a 2–4 record in conference play.

== Schedule ==
Date	Opponent	Site	Result	Attendance	Source
August 31	at No. 20 Southeast Missouri State*	Houck Stadium; Cape Girardeau, MO	W 30–27	9,827	
September 9	Murray State*	McAndrew Stadium; Carbondale, IL	L 3–35	12,200	
September 16	at Arkansas State*	Indian Stadium; Jonesboro, AR	L 9–14	9,901	
September 23	Nicholls State*	McAndrew Stadium; Carbondale, IL	W 48–20	7,600	
September 30	at Indiana State	Memorial Stadium; Terre Haute, IN	L 3–52	4,601	
October 7	Illinois State	McAndrew Stadium; Carbondale, IL	W 14–11	12,600	
October 14	Southwest Missouri State	McAndrew Stadium; Carbondale, IL	W 33–30 ^{OT}	12,100	
October 21	at No. 14 Northern Iowa	UNI-Dome; Cedar Falls, IA	L 0–13	8,558	
October 28	at Western Illinois	Hanson Field; Macomb, IL	L 7–19	4,106	
November 4	Western Kentucky*	McAndrew Stadium; Carbondale, IL	W 30–28	2,400	
November 11	No. 12 Eastern Illinois	McAndrew Stadium; Carbondale, IL	L 21–42	2,100	
*Non-conference game; Rankings from The Sports Network Poll released prior to the game
