= Guy D. Penny =

American football player and coach (1928–2019)

Biographical details
- Born: May 13, 1928; Piedmont, Alabama, U.S.
- Died: April 8, 2019 (aged 90)
- Education: Southern Miss (Ed.D., 1969)

Playing career
- 1946–1949: Ole Miss
- Positions: Fullback, tackle

Coaching career (HC unless noted)
- 1950–1951: Collinville HS (AL)
- 1952–1956: Geneva HS (AL)
- 1957–1958: Tennessee–Martin (assistant)
- 1959–1967: Morehead State

Head coaching record
- Overall: 38–40–2 (college football)

Accomplishments and honors

Championships
- 2 OVC (1962, 1966)

Awards
- OVC Coach of the Year (1966)

Guy D. Penny (May 13, 1928 – April 8, 2019) was an American football coach and player. He served as the head football coach at Morehead State University in Morehead, Kentucky from 1959 to 1967, compiling a record of 38–40–2.

Penny played college football at the University of Mississippi and later served as a physical education faculty member at Middle Tennessee State University from 1970 to 1993.

== Head coaching record ==
=== College football ===
| Year | Team | Overall | Conference | Standing | Bowl/playoffs |
|---|---|---|---|---|---|
Morehead State Eagles (Ohio Valley Conference) (1959–1967)
| 1959 | Morehead State | 3–6 | 1–5 | 6th | |
| 1960 | Morehead State | 5–4 | 2–4 | 4th | |
| 1961 | Morehead State | 1–6–1 | 0–6 | 7th | |
| 1962 | Morehead State | 5–3 | 4–2 | T–1st | |
| 1963 | Morehead State | 5–4 | 3–4 | T–4th | |
| 1964 | Morehead State | 5–4 | 3–4 | T–5th | |
| 1965 | Morehead State | 3–6 | 3–4 | T–4th | |
| 1966 | Morehead State | 7–2 | 6–1 | 1st | |
| 1967 | Morehead State | 4–5–1 | 2–4–1 | 6th | |
| Morehead State: | | 38–40–2 | 24–34–1 | | |
| Total: | | 38–40–2 | | | |
National championship Conference title Conference division title or championship game berth
