= 1995 Tennessee–Martin Skyhawks football team =

American college football season

1995 Tennessee–Martin Skyhawks football
- Conference: Ohio Valley Conference
- Record: 5–6 (4–4 OVC)
- Head coach: Don McLeary (10th season)
- Home stadium: Pacer Stadium

1995 Ohio Valley Conference football standings
	Conf.					Overall
Team	W		L		T	W		L		T
No. 4 Murray State $^	8	–	0	–	0	11	–	1	–	0
No. 10 Eastern Kentucky ^	7	–	1	–	0	9	–	3	–	0
No. 25 Middle Tennessee	6	–	2	–	0	7	–	4	–	0
Southeast Missouri State	5	–	3	–	0	5	–	6	–	0
Tennessee–Martin	4	–	4	–	0	5	–	6	–	0
Austin Peay	2	–	6	–	0	3	–	8	–	0
Tennessee Tech	2	–	6	–	0	3	–	8	–	0
Morehead State	1	–	7	–	0	2	–	8	–	0
Tennessee State	1	–	7	–	0	2	–	9	–	0
$ – Conference champion; ^ – NCAA Division I-AA playoff participant; Rankings from The Sports Network poll

The 1995 Tennessee–Martin Skyhawks football team represented the University of Tennessee at Martin as a member of the Ohio Valley Conference (OVC) during the 1995 NCAA Division I-AA football season. Led by 10th-year head coach Don McLeary, the Skyhawks compiled an overall record of 5–6, with a mark of 4–4 in conference play, and finished fourth in the OVC.

== Schedule ==
Date	Opponent	Site	Result	Attendance	Source
September 7	Bethel (TN)*	Pacer Stadium; Martin, TN	W 97–7		
September 16	at Eastern Illinois*	O'Brien Stadium; Charleston, IL	L 22–30	3,413	
September 23	at Morehead State	Jayne Stadium; Morehead, KY	W 49–24		
September 30	Tennessee Tech	Pacer Stadium; Martin, TN	W 36–31	4,789	
October 7	at No. 11 Murray State	Roy Stewart Stadium; Murray, KY	L 9–33	10,523	
October 14	Tennessee State	Pacer Stadium; Martin, TN	W 28–7		
October 21	at No. 9 Eastern Kentucky	Roy Kidd Stadium; Richmond, KY	L 15–38	12,800	
October 28	Southeast Missouri State	Pacer Stadium; Martin, TN	L 17–38		
November 4	at Middle Tennessee	Johnny "Red" Floyd Stadium; Murfreesboro, TN	L 17–45	9,000	
November 11	Samford*	Pacer Stadium; Martin, TN	L 14–21		
November 18	Austin Peay	Pacer Stadium; Martin, TN	W 31–28	1,316	
*Non-conference game; Rankings from The Sports Network Poll released prior to the game
