= 1995 Middle Tennessee Blue Raiders football team =

American college football season

1995 Middle Tennessee Blue Raiders football
- Conference: Ohio Valley Conference

Ranking
- Sports Network: No. 25
- Record: 7–4 (6–2 OVC)
- Head coach: Boots Donnelly (17th season)
- Offensive coordinator: Tom Fiveash (2nd season)
- Defensive coordinator: Todd Tanney (1st as DC, 2nd overall season)
- Home stadium: Johnny "Red" Floyd Stadium

1995 Ohio Valley Conference football standings
| | Conf. | | | | | Overall |
| Team | W | | L | | T | W | | L | | T |
|---|---|---|---|---|---|---|---|---|---|---|
| No. 4 Murray State $^ | 8 | – | 0 | – | 0 | 11 | – | 1 | – | 0 |
| No. 10 Eastern Kentucky ^ | 7 | – | 1 | – | 0 | 9 | – | 3 | – | 0 |
| No. 25 Middle Tennessee | 6 | – | 2 | – | 0 | 7 | – | 4 | – | 0 |
| Southeast Missouri State | 5 | – | 3 | – | 0 | 5 | – | 6 | – | 0 |
| Tennessee–Martin | 4 | – | 4 | – | 0 | 5 | – | 6 | – | 0 |
| Austin Peay | 2 | – | 6 | – | 0 | 3 | – | 8 | – | 0 |
| Tennessee Tech | 2 | – | 6 | – | 0 | 3 | – | 8 | – | 0 |
| Morehead State | 1 | – | 7 | – | 0 | 2 | – | 8 | – | 0 |
| Tennessee State | 1 | – | 7 | – | 0 | 2 | – | 9 | – | 0 |
$ – Conference champion; ^ – NCAA Division I-AA playoff participant; Rankings from The Sports Network poll

The 1995 Middle Tennessee Blue Raiders football team represented Middle Tennessee State University as a member of the Ohio Valley Conference (OVC) during the 1995 NCAA Division I-AA football season. The team was led by 17th-year head coach Boots Donnelly and played their home games at Johnny "Red" Floyd Stadium in Murfreesboro, Tennessee. The Blue Raiders compiled an overall record of 7–4, with a mark of 6–2 in conference play, and finished third in the OVC.

== Schedule ==
| Date | Opponent | Rank | Site | Result | Attendance | Source |
|---|---|---|---|---|---|---|
| September 2 | Tennessee State | | Johnny "Red" Floyd Stadium; Murfreesboro, TN | W 11–7 | 17,000 | |
| September 9 | vs. No. 17 Georgia Southern* | | Georgia Dome; Atlanta, GA | L 26–34 | 9,529 | |
| September 16 | at Morehead State | | Jayne Stadium; Morehead, KY | W 42–0 | | |
| September 23 | No. 19 Murray State | | Johnny "Red" Floyd Stadium; Murfreesboro, TN | L 0–34 | 12,500 | |
| September 30 | UAB* | | Johnny "Red" Floyd Stadium; Murfreesboro, TN | W 28–13 | 10,000 | |
| October 7 | at Austin Peay | | Governors Stadium; Clarksville, TN | W 43–0 | | |
| October 14 | at No. 9 Eastern Kentucky | | Roy Kidd Stadium; Richmond, KY | L 21–34 | 7,900 | |
| October 21 | Southeast Missouri State | | Johnny "Red" Floyd Stadium; Murfreesboro, TN | W 42–0 | | |
| November 4 | Tennessee–Martin | | Johnny "Red" Floyd Stadium; Murfreesboro, TN | W 45–17 | 9,000 | |
| November 11 | at Tennessee Tech | | Tucker Stadium; Cookeville, TN | W 31–6 | | |
| November 18 | at Texas A&M* | No. 24 | Kyle Field; College Station, TX | L 14–56 | 53,549 | |
*Non-conference game; Rankings from The Sports Network Poll released prior to the game
