= 1995 Murray State Racers football team =

American college football season

1995 Murray State Racers football

OVC champion

NCAA Division I-AA first round, L 34–35 vs. Northern Iowa
- Conference: Ohio Valley Conference

Ranking
- Sports Network: No. 4
- Record: 11–1 (8–0 OVC)
- Head coach: Houston Nutt (3rd season)
- Home stadium: Roy Stewart Stadium

1995 Ohio Valley Conference football standings
	Conf.					Overall
Team	W		L		T	W		L		T
No. 4 Murray State $^	8	–	0	–	0	11	–	1	–	0
No. 10 Eastern Kentucky ^	7	–	1	–	0	9	–	3	–	0
No. 25 Middle Tennessee	6	–	2	–	0	7	–	4	–	0
Southeast Missouri State	5	–	3	–	0	5	–	6	–	0
Tennessee–Martin	4	–	4	–	0	5	–	6	–	0
Austin Peay	2	–	6	–	0	3	–	8	–	0
Tennessee Tech	2	–	6	–	0	3	–	8	–	0
Morehead State	1	–	7	–	0	2	–	8	–	0
Tennessee State	1	–	7	–	0	2	–	9	–	0
$ – Conference champion; ^ – NCAA Division I-AA playoff participant; Rankings from The Sports Network poll

The 1995 Murray State Racers football team represented Murray State University during the 1995 NCAA Division I-AA football season as a member of the Ohio Valley Conference (OVC). Led by third-year head coach Houston Nutt, the Racers compiled an overall record of 11–1, with a mark of 8–0 in conference play, and finished as OVC champion. Murray State advanced to the NCAA Division I-AA Football Championship playoffs, where they lost in the first round to Northern Iowa.

Head coach Houston Nutt won the Eddie Robinson Award, annually to college football's top head coach in the NCAA Division I Football Championship Subdivision (formerly Division I-AA).

== Schedule ==
Date	Opponent	Rank	Site	Result	Attendance	Source
August 31	at Western Kentucky*		L. T. Smith Stadium; Bowling Green, KY (rivalry)	W 35–14	13,200	
September 9	at Southern Illinois*		McAndrew Stadium; Carbondale, IL	W 35–3	12,200	
September 16	Southeast Missouri State	No. 24	Roy Stewart Stadium; Murray, KY	W 34–0	11,238	
September 23	at Middle Tennessee	No. 19	Johnny "Red" Floyd Stadium; Murfreesboro, TN	W 34–0	12,500	
September 30	at Austin Peay	No. 15	Governors Stadium; Clarksville, TN	W 45–17	4,217	
October 7	Tennessee–Martin	No. 11	Roy Stewart Stadium; Murray, KY	W 33–9	10,523	
October 14	Morehead State	No. 11	Roy Stewart Stadium; Murray, KY	W 63–13		
October 28	at Tennessee Tech	No. 8	Tucker Stadium; Cookeville, TN	W 45–14		
November 4	No. 5 Eastern Kentucky	No. 8	Roy Stewart Stadium; Murray, KY	W 17–7	15,711	
November 11	at Tennessee State	No. 5	Hale Stadium; Nashville, TN	W 24–19	2,115	
November 18	Western Illinois*	No. 4	Roy Stewart Stadium; Murray, KY	W 56–18		
November 25	No. 18 Northern Iowa*	No. 4	Roy Stewart Stadium; Murray, KY (NCAA Division I-AA First Round)	L 34–35	7,633	
*Non-conference game; Rankings from The Sports Network Poll released prior to the game
