= 1995 Southwest Missouri State Bears football team =

American college football season

1995 Southwest Missouri State Bears football
- Conference: Gateway Football Conference
- Record: 4–7 (1–5 GFC)
- Head coach: Del Miller (1st season)
- Offensive coordinator: Charley Wade (1st season)
- Defensive coordinator: Mike Kolling (4th season)
- Captains: DeLaun Fowler; Kyle Geller; Luke Hake; Willie Parks; Phil Perkins; Tom Procter
- Home stadium: Plaster Sports Complex

1995 Gateway Football Conference standings
	Conf.					Overall
Team	W		L		T	W		L		T
No. 12 Eastern Illinois +^	5	–	1	–	0	10	–	2	–	0
No. 18 Northern Iowa +^	5	–	1	–	0	8	–	5	–	0
No. 24 Indiana State	3	–	3	–	0	7	–	4	–	0
Illinois State	3	–	3	–	0	5	–	6	–	0
Southern Illinois	2	–	4	–	0	5	–	6	–	0
Western Illinois	2	–	4	–	0	4	–	7	–	0
Southwest Missouri State	1	–	5	–	0	4	–	7	–	0
$ – Conference champion; ^ – NCAA Division I-AA playoff participant; Rankings from The Sports Network poll

The 1995 Southwest Missouri State Bears football team represented Southwest Missouri State University (now known as Missouri State University) as a member of the Gateway Football Conference (GFC) during the 1995 NCAA Division I-AA football season. Led by first-year head coach Del Miller, the Bears compiled an overall record of 4–7, with a mark of 1–5 in conference play, and finished seventh in the GFC.

== Schedule ==
Date	Opponent	Site	Result	Attendance	Source
September 2	No. 3 McNeese State*	Plaster Sports Complex; Springfield, MO	L 2–31	13,794	
September 9	Northeast Missouri State*	Plaster Sports Complex; Springfield, MO	W 30–17	12,237	
September 16	at Oklahoma State*	Lewis Field; Stillwater, OK	L 7–35	37,350	
September 23	at Eastern Illinois	O'Brien Field; Charleston, IL	L 7–9		
September 30	Illinois State	Plaster Sports Complex; Springfield, MO	L 17–20 ^{OT}		
October 7	Indiana State	Plaster Sports Complex; Springfield, MO	L 9–16	11,614	
October 14	at Southern Illinois	McAndrew Stadium; Carbondale, IL	L 30–33 ^{OT}	12,100	
October 25	at Western Illinois	Hanson Field; Macomb, IL	W 13–7		
October 28	No. 11 Northern Iowa	Plaster Sports Complex; Springfield, MO	L 17–19	10,906	
November 11	at Southeast Missouri State*	Houck Stadium; Cape Girardeau, MO	W 39–3		
November 18	Jacksonville State*	Plaster Sports Complex; Springfield, MO	W 49–14	5,004	
*Non-conference game; Rankings from The Sports Network Poll released prior to the game
