= 1995 Southeast Missouri State Indians football team =

American college football season

1995 Southeast Missouri State Indians football
- Conference: Ohio Valley Conference
- Record: 5–6 (5–3 OVC)
- Head coach: John Mumford (6th season)
- Home stadium: Houck Stadium

1995 Ohio Valley Conference football standings
	Conf.					Overall
Team	W		L		T	W		L		T
No. 4 Murray State $^	8	–	0	–	0	11	–	1	–	0
No. 10 Eastern Kentucky ^	7	–	1	–	0	9	–	3	–	0
No. 25 Middle Tennessee	6	–	2	–	0	7	–	4	–	0
Southeast Missouri State	5	–	3	–	0	5	–	6	–	0
Tennessee–Martin	4	–	4	–	0	5	–	6	–	0
Austin Peay	2	–	6	–	0	3	–	8	–	0
Tennessee Tech	2	–	6	–	0	3	–	8	–	0
Morehead State	1	–	7	–	0	2	–	8	–	0
Tennessee State	1	–	7	–	0	2	–	9	–	0
$ – Conference champion; ^ – NCAA Division I-AA playoff participant; Rankings from The Sports Network poll

The 1995 Southeast Missouri State Indians football team represented Southeast Missouri State University as a member of the Ohio Valley Conference (OVC) during the 1995 NCAA Division I-AA football season. Led by sixth-year head coach John Mumford, the Indians compiled an overall record of 5–6, with a mark of 5–3 in conference play, and finished fourth in the OVC.

== Schedule ==
Date	Opponent	Rank	Site	Result	Attendance	Source
August 31	Southern Illinois*	No. 20	Houck Stadium; Cape Girardeau, MO	L 27–30	9,827	
September 9	at Eastern Illinois*		O'Brien Stadium; Charleston, IL	L 18–34		
September 16	at No. 24 Murray State		Roy Stewart Stadium; Murray, KY	L 0–34	11,238	
September 23	at Austin Peay		Governors Stadium; Clarksville, TN	W 38–23	3,037	
September 30	No. 8 Eastern Kentucky		Houck Stadium; Cape Girardeau, MO	L 24–42	7,105	
October 7	Tennessee Tech		Houck Stadium; Cape Girardeau, MO	W 33–12		
October 21	at Middle Tennessee		Johnny "Red" Floyd Stadium; Murfreesboro, TN	L 0–42		
October 28	at Tennessee–Martin		Pacer Stadium; Martin, TN	W 38–17		
November 4	Morehead State		Houck Stadium; Cape Girardeau, MO	W 21–12		
November 11	Southwest Missouri State*		Houck Stadium; Cape Girardeau, MO	L 3–39		
November 18	Tennessee State		Houck Stadium; Cape Girardeau, MO	W 41–24		
*Non-conference game; Rankings from The Sports Network Poll released prior to the game
