= 1995 Eastern Kentucky Colonels football team =

American college football season

1995 Eastern Kentucky Colonels football

NCAA Division I-AA first round, L 0–48 at Montana
- Conference: Ohio Valley Conference

Ranking
- Sports Network: No. 10
- Record: 9–3 (7–1 OVC)
- Head coach: Roy Kidd (32nd season)
- Home stadium: Roy Kidd Stadium

1995 Ohio Valley Conference football standings
	Conf.					Overall
Team	W		L		T	W		L		T
No. 4 Murray State $^	8	–	0	–	0	11	–	1	–	0
No. 10 Eastern Kentucky ^	7	–	1	–	0	9	–	3	–	0
No. 25 Middle Tennessee	6	–	2	–	0	7	–	4	–	0
Southeast Missouri State	5	–	3	–	0	5	–	6	–	0
Tennessee–Martin	4	–	4	–	0	5	–	6	–	0
Austin Peay	2	–	6	–	0	3	–	8	–	0
Tennessee Tech	2	–	6	–	0	3	–	8	–	0
Morehead State	1	–	7	–	0	2	–	8	–	0
Tennessee State	1	–	7	–	0	2	–	9	–	0
$ – Conference champion; ^ – NCAA Division I-AA playoff participant; Rankings from The Sports Network poll

The 1995 Eastern Kentucky Colonels football team represented Eastern Kentucky University as a member of the Ohio Valley Conference (OVC) during the 1995 NCAA Division I-AA football season. Led by 31st-year head coach Roy Kidd, the Colonels compiled an overall record of 9–3, with a mark of 7–1 in conference play, and finished second in the OVC. Eastern Kentucky advanced to the NCAA Division I-AA playoffs and were defeated by Montana in the first round.

== Schedule ==
Date	Opponent	Rank	Site	Result	Attendance	Source
August 31	at UCF*	No. 5	Florida Citrus Bowl; Orlando, FL	L 32–40	13,442	
September 9	Western Kentucky*	No. 11	Roy Kidd Stadium; Richmond, KY (rivalry)	W 38–14	18,600	
September 16	East Stroudsburg*	No. 9	Roy Kidd Stadium; Richmond, KY	W 26–0		
September 23	at Tennessee Tech	No. 9	Tucker Stadium; Cookeville, TN	W 21–3		
September 30	at Southeast Missouri State	No. 8	Houck Stadium; Cape Girardeau, MO	W 42–24	7,105	
October 14	Middle Tennessee	No. 9	Roy Kidd Stadium; Richmond, KY	W 34–21	7,900	
October 21	Tennessee–Martin	No. 9	Roy Kidd Stadium; Richmond, KY	W 38–15	12,800	
October 28	at Tennessee State	No. 6	Hale Stadium; Nashville, TN	W 56–20	2,716	
November 4	at No. 8 Murray State	No. 5	Roy Stewart Stadium; Murray, KY	L 7–17	15,711	
November 11	Austin Peay	No. 10	Roy Kidd Stadium; Richmond, KY	W 28–0	2,200	
November 18	Morehead State	No. 10	Roy Kidd Stadium; Richmond, KY (rivalry)	W 41–10		
November 25	at No. 8 Montana*	No. 10	Washington–Grizzly Stadium; Missoula, MT (NCAA Division I-AA First Round)	L 0–48	13,830	
*Non-conference game; Rankings from The Sports Network Poll released prior to the game
