= 1995 Austin Peay Governors football team =

American college football season

1995 Austin Peay Governors football
- Conference: Ohio Valley Conference
- Record: 3–8 (2–6 OVC)
- Head coach: Roy Gregory (5th season)
- Home stadium: Governors Stadium

1995 Ohio Valley Conference football standings
	Conf.					Overall
Team	W		L		T	W		L		T
No. 4 Murray State $^	8	–	0	–	0	11	–	1	–	0
No. 10 Eastern Kentucky ^	7	–	1	–	0	9	–	3	–	0
No. 25 Middle Tennessee	6	–	2	–	0	7	–	4	–	0
Southeast Missouri State	5	–	3	–	0	5	–	6	–	0
Tennessee–Martin	4	–	4	–	0	5	–	6	–	0
Austin Peay	2	–	6	–	0	3	–	8	–	0
Tennessee Tech	2	–	6	–	0	3	–	8	–	0
Morehead State	1	–	7	–	0	2	–	8	–	0
Tennessee State	1	–	7	–	0	2	–	9	–	0
$ – Conference champion; ^ – NCAA Division I-AA playoff participant; Rankings from The Sports Network poll

The 1995 Austin Peay Governors football team represented Austin Peay State University as a member of the Ohio Valley Conference (OVC) during the 1995 NCAA Division I-AA football season. Led by fifth-year head coach Roy Gregory, the Governors compiled an overall record of 3–8, with a mark of 2–6 in conference play, and finished tied for sixth in the OVC.

== Schedule ==
Date	Opponent	Site	Result	Attendance	Source
August 31	Eastern Illinois*	Governors Stadium; Clarksville, TN	L 13–31	4,017	
September 9	Samford*	Governors Stadium; Clarksville, TN	L 32–42	5,241	
September 16	Western Kentucky*	Governors Stadium; Clarksville, TN	W 38–34	4,117	
September 23	Southeast Missouri State	Governors Stadium; Clarksville, TN	L 23–38	3,037	
September 30	No. 15 Murray State	Governors Stadium; Clarksville, TN	L 17–45	4,217	
October 7	Middle Tennessee	Governors Stadium; Clarksville, TN	L 0–43		
October 14	at Tennessee Tech	Tucker Stadium; Cookeville, TN	W 20–17	1,400	
October 21	Tennessee State	Governors Stadium; Clarksville, TN	W 28–6	6,714	
October 28	at Morehead State	Jayne Stadium; Morehead, KY	L 13–26		
November 11	at No. 10 Eastern Kentucky	Roy Kidd Stadium; Richmond, KY	L 0–28	2,200	
November 18	at Tennessee–Martin	Pacer Stadium; Martin, TN	L 28–31	1,316	
*Non-conference game; Rankings from The Sports Network Poll released prior to the game
