= 1995 Illinois State Redbirds football team =

American college football season

1995 Illinois State Redbirds football
- Conference: Gateway Football Conference
- Record: 5–6 (3–3 GFC)
- Head coach: Jim Heacock (8th season)
- Home stadium: Hancock Stadium

1995 Gateway Football Conference standings
	Conf.					Overall
Team	W		L		T	W		L		T
No. 12 Eastern Illinois +^	5	–	1	–	0	10	–	2	–	0
No. 18 Northern Iowa +^	5	–	1	–	0	8	–	5	–	0
No. 24 Indiana State	3	–	3	–	0	7	–	4	–	0
Illinois State	3	–	3	–	0	5	–	6	–	0
Southern Illinois	2	–	4	–	0	5	–	6	–	0
Western Illinois	2	–	4	–	0	4	–	7	–	0
Southwest Missouri State	1	–	5	–	0	4	–	7	–	0
$ – Conference champion; ^ – NCAA Division I-AA playoff participant; Rankings from The Sports Network poll

The 1995 Illinois State Redbirds football team represented Illinois State University as a member of the Gateway Football Conference (GFC) during the 1995 NCAA Division I-AA football season. In their eighth year under head coach Jim Heacock, the Redbirds compiled an overall record of 5–6, with a mark of 3–3 in conference play, and finished tied for third in the GFC. Illinois State played home games at Hancock Stadium in Normal, Illinois.

== Schedule ==
Date	Opponent	Site	Result	Attendance	Source
August 31	St. Francis (IL)*	Hancock Stadium; Normal, IL	W 45–3		
September 9	at Ohio*	Peden Stadium; Athens, OH	L 6–14		
September 16	Buffalo*	Hancock Stadium; Normal, IL	L 6–19	6,245	
September 23	No. 25 Hofstra*^{†}	Hancock Stadium; Normal, IL	L 0–27	6,648	
September 30	at Southwest Missouri State	Plaster Sports Complex; Springfield, MO	W 20–17 ^{OT}	11,915	
October 7	at Southern Illinois	McAndrew Stadium; Carbondale, IL	L 11–14	12,600	
October 14	Western Illinois	Hancock Stadium; Normal, IL	L 22–25	10,146	
October 28	at No. 18 Eastern Illinois	O'Brien Stadium; Charleston, IL (rivalry)	L 10–31	8,108	
November 4	No. 11 Northern Iowa	Hancock Stadium; Normal, IL	W 31–29		
November 11	No. 14 Indiana State	Hancock Stadium; Normal, IL	W 25–0	4,175	
November 18	at Youngstown State*	Stambaugh Stadium; Youngstown, OH	W 30–13		
*Non-conference game; ^{†}Homecoming; Rankings from The Sports Network Poll released prior to the game
