= Matt Ballard =

American football coach (born 1957)

Biographical details
- Born: May 14, 1957 (age 69); Davidson, North Carolina, U.S.

Coaching career (HC unless noted)
- 1979: Gardner–Webb (assistant)
- 1980–1983: Georgetown (KY) (OC/DC)
- 1984–1987: Morehead State (asst. HC/DC)
- 1988–1993: Union (KY)
- 1994–2012: Morehead State

Head coaching record
- Overall: 137–130–1

Accomplishments and honors

Championships
- 1 MSC (1992); 4 PFL South Division (2002–2005)

Douglas Matthew Ballard (born May 14, 1957) is an American college football coach, most recently the head coach at Morehead State University, a position he held from 1994 until his firing at the end of the 2012 season. He also served as the head coach at another Kentucky school, Union College, from 1988 to 1993.

== Head coaching record ==
Year	Team	Overall	Conference	Standing	Bowl/playoffs
Union (Kentucky) Bulldogs (Mid-South Conference) (1988–1993)
1988	Union	6–4	2–3	4th	
1989	Union	4–5–1	3–3	T–3rd	
1990	Union	5–5	1–4	T–4th	
1991	Union	6–4	3–3	T–3rd	
1992	Union	8–2	4–1	T–1st	
1993	Union	5–5	2–3	T–3rd	
Union:		34–25–1	15–17		
Morehead State Eagles (Ohio Valley Conference) (1994–1995)
1994	Morehead State	0–11	0–8	9th	
1995	Morehead State	2–8	1–7	T–8th	
Morehead State Eagles (NCAA Division I-AA independent) (1996–2000)
1996	Morehead State	6–4			
1997	Morehead State	7–3			
1998	Morehead State	9–2			
1999	Morehead State	5–5			
2000	Morehead State	6–3			
Morehead State Eagles (Pioneer Football League) (2001–2012)
2001	Morehead State	6–5	2–1	2nd (South)	
2002	Morehead State	9–3	3–0	1st (South)	
2003	Morehead State	8–3	3–0	1st (South)	
2004	Morehead State	6–6	2–1	T–1st (South)	
2005	Morehead State	8–4	3–0	1st (South)	
2006	Morehead State	2–5	2–9	T–5th	
2007	Morehead State	7–4	5–2	3rd	
2008	Morehead State	6–6	3–3	T–4th	
2009	Morehead State	3–8	1–7	9th	
2010	Morehead State	5–6	4–4	5th	
2011	Morehead State	3–8	2–6	5th	
2012	Morehead State	4–7	3–5	T–6th	
Morehead State:		102–105	34–53		
Total:		136–130–1			
National championship Conference title Conference division title or championship game berth
