= 1995 Western Illinois Leathernecks football team =

American college football season

1995 Western Illinois Leathernecks football
- Conference: Gateway Football Conference
- Record: 4–7 (2–4 GFC)
- Head coach: Randy Ball (6th season)
- Home stadium: Hanson Field

1995 Gateway Football Conference standings
	Conf.					Overall
Team	W		L		T	W		L		T
No. 12 Eastern Illinois +^	5	–	1	–	0	10	–	2	–	0
No. 18 Northern Iowa +^	5	–	1	–	0	8	–	5	–	0
No. 24 Indiana State	3	–	3	–	0	7	–	4	–	0
Illinois State	3	–	3	–	0	5	–	6	–	0
Southern Illinois	2	–	4	–	0	5	–	6	–	0
Western Illinois	2	–	4	–	0	4	–	7	–	0
Southwest Missouri State	1	–	5	–	0	4	–	7	–	0
$ – Conference champion; ^ – NCAA Division I-AA playoff participant; Rankings from The Sports Network poll

The 1995 Western Illinois Leathernecks football team represented Western Illinois University as a member of the Gateway Football Conference (GFC) during the 1995 NCAA Division I-AA football season. The team was led by sixth-year head coach Randy Ball and played their home games at Hanson Field in Macomb, Illinois. The Leathernecks finished the season with a 4–7 record overall and a 2–4 record in conference play.

== Schedule ==
Date	Opponent	Rank	Site	Result	Attendance	Source
August 31	Iowa Wesleyan*		Hanson Field; Macomb, IL	W 86–0		
September 9	at Ball State*		Ball State Stadium; Muncie, IN	L 17–20	14,466	
September 16	Delaware State*	No. 23	Hanson Field; Macomb, IL	W 41–14		
September 23	at Indiana State	No. 23	Memorial Stadium; Terre Haute, IN	L 13–30	4,517	
September 30	No. 22 Northern Iowa		Hanson Field; Macomb, IL	L 7–38		
October 14	at Illinois State		Hancock Stadium; Normal, IL	W 25–22	10,146	
October 25	Southwest Missouri State		Hanson Field; Macomb, IL	L 7–13		
October 28	Southern Illinois		Hanson Field; Macomb, IL	W 19–7	4,106	
November 4	at No. 15 Eastern Illinois		O'Brien Stadium; Charleston, IL	L 17–20		
November 11	at Jacksonville State*		Paul Snow Stadium; Jacksonville, AL	L 27–32	7,152	
November 18	at No. 4 Murray State*		Roy Stewart Stadium; Murray, KY	L 18–56		
*Non-conference game; Rankings from The Sports Network Poll released prior to the game
