= 1995 Northern Iowa Panthers football team =

American college football season

1995 Northern Iowa Panthers football

Gateway co-champion

NCAA Division I-AA Quarterfinal, L 24–41 vs. Marshall
- Conference: Gateway Football Conference

Ranking
- Sports Network: No. 18
- Record: 8–5 (5–1 Gateway)
- Head coach: Terry Allen (7th season)
- Home stadium: UNI-Dome

1995 Gateway Football Conference standings
| | Conf. | | | | | Overall |
| Team | W | | L | | T | W | | L | | T |
|---|---|---|---|---|---|---|---|---|---|---|
| No. 12 Eastern Illinois +^ | 5 | – | 1 | – | 0 | 10 | – | 2 | – | 0 |
| No. 18 Northern Iowa +^ | 5 | – | 1 | – | 0 | 8 | – | 5 | – | 0 |
| No. 24 Indiana State | 3 | – | 3 | – | 0 | 7 | – | 4 | – | 0 |
| Illinois State | 3 | – | 3 | – | 0 | 5 | – | 6 | – | 0 |
| Southern Illinois | 2 | – | 4 | – | 0 | 5 | – | 6 | – | 0 |
| Western Illinois | 2 | – | 4 | – | 0 | 4 | – | 7 | – | 0 |
| Southwest Missouri State | 1 | – | 5 | – | 0 | 4 | – | 7 | – | 0 |
$ – Conference champion; ^ – NCAA Division I-AA playoff participant; Rankings from The Sports Network poll

The 1995 Northern Iowa Panthers football team was an American football team that represented the University of Northern Iowa as a member of the Gateway Football Conference (Gateway Conference) during the 1995 NCAA Division I-AA football season. In its seventh year under head coach Terry Allen, the team compiled an 8–5 record (5–1 in conference games), outscored opponents by a total of 337 to 236, and tied for the Gateway Conference championship, winning at least a share of the championship for the sixth consecutive year. Northern Iowa advanced to the NCAA Division I-AA playoffs, where the Panthers defeated Murray State in the first round before losing to the eventual national runner-up, Marshall, in the quarterfinals.

Junior wide receiver Dedric Ward tallied 1,283 receiving yards, led the country with an average of 25.7 yards per catch, was selected as the Gateway Conference offensive player of the year, and was named by the Associated Press, American Football Coaches Association, Football Gazette, Sports Network and the Walter Camp Football Foundation to the 1995 Division I-AA All-America team. Five Northern Iowa players were honored as first-team players on the 1995 all-Gateway football team: Ward; quarterback Chris Berg; offensive lineman Dan Bower; nose tackle Brian Moretz; and defensive back Tyree Talton. Five others, including running back Jeff Stovall Jr., were named to the second team. Berg completed 146 of 258 passes for 23 touchdowns and tallied 2,530 yards of total offense. Talton intercepted eight passes. Kevin Hammond tallied 12 sacks.

The team played its home games at the UNI-Dome in Cedar Falls, Iowa.

== Schedule ==
| Date | Opponent | Rank | Site | Result | Attendance | Source |
|---|---|---|---|---|---|---|
| September 2 | at No. 13 Stephen F. Austin* | No. 19 | Homer Bryce Stadium; Nacogdoches, TX | L 7–26 | 10,041 | |
| September 9 | at Iowa* | No. 23 | Kinnick Stadium; Iowa City, IA | L 13–34 | 70,397 | |
| September 16 | Lock Haven* | No. 21 | UNI-Dome; Cedar Falls, IA | W 55–10 | 10,237 | |
| September 30 | at Western Illinois | No. 22 | Hanson Field; Macomb, IL | W 38–7 | | |
| October 7 | No. 22 Eastern Illinois | No. 21 | UNI-Dome; Cedar Falls, IA | W 17–7 | 14,182 | |
| October 14 | No. 23 Indiana State | No. 18 | UNI-Dome; Cedar Falls, IA | W 27–10 | 9,869 | |
| October 21 | Southern Illinois | No. 14 | UNI-Dome; Cedar Falls, IA | W 13–0 | 8,558 | |
| October 28 | at Southwest Missouri State | No. 11 | Plaster Sports Complex; Springfield, MO | W 19–17 | 10,906 | |
| November 4 | at Illinois State | No. 11 | Hancock Stadium; Normal, IL | L 29–31 | | |
| November 11 | Idaho* | No. 15 | UNI-Dome; Cedar Falls, IA | L 12–16 | 16,324 | |
| November 18 | Winona State* | No. 22 | UNI-Dome; Cedar Falls, IA | W 48–3 | | |
| November 25 | at No. 4 Murray State* | No. 18 | Roy Stewart Stadium; Murray, KY (NCAA Division I-AA First Round) | W 35–34 | 7,633 | |
| December 2 | at No. 6 Marshall* | No. 18 | Marshall University Stadium; Huntington, WV (NCAA Division I-AA Quarterfinal) | L 24–41 | 14,472 | |
*Non-conference game; Rankings from The Sports Network Poll released prior to the game

== Roster ==
=== Offense ===
- Chris Berg, quarterback, senior, 6'1", 196 pounds
- Dan Bower, left guard, senior, 6'4", 248 pounds
- Chris Clapp, left tackle, sophomore, 6'4", 256 pounds
- Mark Culver, right guard, junior, 6'4", 260 pounds
- Troy Dooley, fullback, senior, 6'2", 233 pounds
- Matt Harken, tight end, senior, 6'7", 263 pounds
- Jake Kothe, split end, senior, 5'11", 170 pounds
- Andy Pattee, right tackle, sophomore, 6'4", 263 pounds
- Jon Pilcher, center, senior, 6'2", 259 pounds
- Jeff Stovall, running back, junior, 5'10", 213 pounds
- Dedric Ward, flanker, junior, 5'9", 172 pounds

=== Defense ===
- Willie Barney, defensive end/tackle, junior, 6'3", 261 pounds
- Ryan Behr, defensive end, senior, 6'3", 271 pounds
- Marcus Easter, safety, junior, 6'1", 180 pounds
- Kevin Hammond, linebacker, senior, 6'2", 220 pounds
- Tim Miller, linebacker, junior, 6'3", 212 pounds
- Brian Moretz, nose tackle, senior, 6'0", 280 pounds
- Dannie Spann, linebacker, junior, 6'0", 235 pounds
- Steve St. Mayer, cornerback, freshman, 6'0", 180 pounds
- Maceo Strickland, safety, sophomore, 6'1", 205 pounds
- Ty Talton, cornerback, freshman, 6'0", 189 pounds
- Brandon Williams, linebacker, sophomore, 6'3", 250 pounds

=== Special teams ===
- Anthony Taylor, return specialist
- Justin Urbanek, punter, freshman, 6'0", 211 pounds
- Matt Waller, placekicker, junior, 5'11", 173 pounds
