= 1995 Eastern Illinois Panthers football team =

American college football season

1995 Eastern Illinois Panthers football

Gateway champion

NCAA Division I-AA First Round, L 29–34 vs.Stephen F. Austin
- Conference: Gateway Football Conference

Ranking
- Sports Network: No. 12
- Record: 10–2 (5–1 Gateway)
- Head coach: Bob Spoo (9th season)
- Offensive coordinator: Roy Wittke (6th season)
- Home stadium: O'Brien Stadium

1995 Gateway Football Conference standings
	Conf.					Overall
Team	W		L		T	W		L		T
No. 12 Eastern Illinois +^	5	–	1	–	0	10	–	2	–	0
No. 18 Northern Iowa +^	5	–	1	–	0	8	–	5	–	0
No. 24 Indiana State	3	–	3	–	0	7	–	4	–	0
Illinois State	3	–	3	–	0	5	–	6	–	0
Southern Illinois	2	–	4	–	0	5	–	6	–	0
Western Illinois	2	–	4	–	0	4	–	7	–	0
Southwest Missouri State	1	–	5	–	0	4	–	7	–	0
$ – Conference champion; ^ – NCAA Division I-AA playoff participant; Rankings from The Sports Network poll

The 1995 Eastern Illinois Panthers football team represented Eastern Illinois University as a member of the Gateway Football Conference during the 1995 NCAA Division I-AA football season. Led by ninth-year head coach Bob Spoo, the Panthers compiled and overall record of 10–2 with a mark of 5–1 in conference play, winning the Gateway title. Eastern Illinois was invited to the NCAA Division I-AA Football Championship playoffs, where they lost to Stephen F. Austin in the first round.

== Schedule ==
Date	Opponent	Rank	Site	Result	Attendance	Source
August 31	at Austin Peay*		Governors Stadium; Clarksville, TN	W 31–13	4,017	
September 9	Southeast Missouri State*		O'Brien Stadium; Charleston, IL	W 34–18		
September 16	Tennessee–Martin*		O'Brien Stadium; Charleston, IL	W 30–22	3,413	
September 23	Southwest Missouri State		O'Brien Stadium; Charleston, IL	W 9–7		
September 30	Central State (OH)*		O'Brien Stadium; Charleston, IL	W 33–27	5,032	
October 7	at No. 21 Northern Iowa	No. 22	UNI-Dome; Cedar Falls, IA	L 7–17	14,182	
October 14	at Western Kentucky*	No. 25	L. T. Smith Stadium; Bowling Green, KY	W 35–9	12,000	
October 28	Illinois State	No. 18	O'Brien Stadium; Charleston, IL	W 31–10	8,108	
November 4	Western Illinois	No. 15	O'Brien Stadium; Charleston, IL	W 20–17		
November 11	at Southern Illinois	No. 12	McAndrew Stadium; Carbondale, IL	W 42–21	2,100	
November 18	at No. 19 Indiana State	No. 12	Memorial Stadium; Terre Haute, IN	W 27–6		
November 25	at No. 5 Stephen F. Austin*	No. 12	Homer Bryce Stadium; Nacogdoches, TX (NCAA Division I-AA First Round)	L 29–34		
*Non-conference game; Rankings from The Sports Network Poll released prior to the game
