= 1995 Tennessee Tech Golden Eagles football team =

American college football season

1995 Tennessee Tech Golden Eagles football
- Conference: Ohio Valley Conference
- Record: 3–8 (2–6 OVC)
- Head coach: Jim Ragland (10th season)
- Home stadium: Tucker Stadium

1995 Ohio Valley Conference football standings
	Conf.					Overall
Team	W		L		T	W		L		T
No. 4 Murray State $^	8	–	0	–	0	11	–	1	–	0
No. 10 Eastern Kentucky ^	7	–	1	–	0	9	–	3	–	0
No. 25 Middle Tennessee	6	–	2	–	0	7	–	4	–	0
Southeast Missouri State	5	–	3	–	0	5	–	6	–	0
Tennessee–Martin	4	–	4	–	0	5	–	6	–	0
Austin Peay	2	–	6	–	0	3	–	8	–	0
Tennessee Tech	2	–	6	–	0	3	–	8	–	0
Morehead State	1	–	7	–	0	2	–	8	–	0
Tennessee State	1	–	7	–	0	2	–	9	–	0
$ – Conference champion; ^ – NCAA Division I-AA playoff participant; Rankings from The Sports Network poll

The 1995 Tennessee Tech Golden Eagles football team represented Tennessee Technological University (commonly referred to as Tennessee Tech) as a member of the Ohio Valley Conference (OVC) during the 1995 NCAA Division I-AA football season. Led by 10th-year head coach Jim Ragland, the Golden Eagles compiled an overall record of 3–8, with a mark of 2–6 in conference play, and finished tied for sixth in the OVC.

== Schedule ==
Date	Opponent	Site	Result	Attendance	Source
August 31	Campbellsville*	Tucker Stadium; Cookeville, TN	W 49–0	6,850	
September 9	at No. 3 Marshall*	Marshall University Stadium; Huntington, WV	L 14–45		
September 16	at Samford*	Seibert Stadium; Homewood, AL	L 24–27	4,683	
September 23	No. 9 Eastern Kentucky	Tucker Stadium; Cookeville, TN	L 3–21		
September 30	at Tennessee–Martin	Pacer Stadium; Martin, TN	L 31–36	4,789	
October 7	at Southeast Missouri State	Houck Stadium; Cape Girardeau, MO	L 12–33		
October 14	Austin Peay	Tucker Stadium; Cookeville, TN	L 17–20	1,400	
October 21	at Morehead State	Jayne Stadium; Morehead, KY	W 36–29	5,000	
October 28	No. 8 Murray State	Tucker Stadium; Cookeville, TN	L 14–45		
November 4	at Tennessee State	Hale Stadium; Nashville, TN	W 28–24	16,128	
November 11	Middle Tennessee	Tucker Stadium; Cookeville, TN	L 6–31		
*Non-conference game; Rankings from The Sports Network Poll released prior to the game
