= Dan Brandenburg =

American football player (born 1973)

No. 96
- Position: Linebacker

Personal information
- Born: February 2, 1973 (age 53); Rensselaer, Indiana, U.S.
- Listed height: 6 ft 4 in (1.93 m)
- Listed weight: 245 lb (111 kg)

Career information
- High school: Rennselaer Central
- College: Indiana State
- NFL draft: 1996: 7th round, 237th overall pick

Career history
- Buffalo Bills (1996–1999); Philadelphia Eagles (2000)*
- * Offseason or practice squad member only

Career NFL statistics
- Games played: 42
- Tackles: 52
- Fumbles recovered: 1
- Stats at Pro Football Reference

Daniel R. Brandenburg (born February 16, 1973) is an American former professional football player who was a linebacker for four seasons in the National Football League (NFL). He played college football for the Indiana State Sycamores. He was selected by the Buffalo Bills in the seventh round of the 1996 NFL draft.

In four seasons at Indiana State University, Brandenburg had 215 tackles (116 solo and 99 assist) while recording a school record 32 sacks (since broken). He also set the school record for sacks in a season with 13 during his sophomore campaign. He was a two-time All-American, and three-time All-Missouri Valley Football Conference defensive end for the Sycamores. He was selected for the 1995 Blue-Gray Game and led the Blue squad to a 26–7 victory over the Gray squad.

In three seasons with the Bills, he starred on special teams and was a reserve linebacker. He signed a free agent contract with the Eagles on March 4, 2000, and retired from football in August 2000.

In 2009, he was voted to the Missouri Valley Football Conference Silver Anniversary Team, alongside notables such as Sean Payton, Kurt Warner, Bryce Paup and Bryan Cox

In 2013, he was inducted into the Indiana State University Athletic Hall of Fame as a member of its 22nd class.

He is also a member of his high school's sports hall of fame.

His father, Steve, a running back for the Sycamores in the early 1960s; remains the single game leading scorer 24 points (4 TDs vs. Ball State).
