= Morehead State Eagles football =

Intercollegiate American football team

2026 Morehead State Eagles football team
- First season: 1927; 99 years ago
- Athletic director: Kelly Wells
- Head coach: Jason Woodman; 2nd season, 13–11 (.542)
- Location: Morehead, Kentucky
- Stadium: Phil Simms Stadium (capacity: 10,000)
- NCAA division: Division I FCS
- Conference: Pioneer Football League
- Colors: Blue and gold
- All-time record: 382–520–22 (.425)

Conference championships
- OVC: 1962, 1966

Division championships
- PFL South: 2002, 2003, 2004, 2005
- Website: MSUEagles.com

The Morehead State Eagles football program is the intercollegiate American football team for Morehead State University located in the U.S. state of Kentucky. The team competes in the NCAA Division I Football Championship Subdivision (FCS) and are members of the Pioneer Football League, the only public school in the conference. Morehead State's first football team was fielded in 1927. The team plays its home games at the 10,000 seat Phil Simms Stadium (historically Jayne Stadium) in Morehead, Kentucky.

== History ==
=== Classifications ===
- 1962–1972: NCAA College Division
- 1973–1977: NCAA Division II
- 1978–present: NCAA Division I–AA/FCS

=== Conference memberships ===
- 1924–1928: Independent
- 1929–1932: West Virginia Intercollegiate Athletic Conference
- 1933: Independent
- 1934–1941: Southern Intercollegiate Athletic Association
- 1942–1945: Independent
- 1946–1947: Kentucky Intercollegiate Athletic Conference
- 1948–1995: Ohio Valley Conference
- 1996–2000: NCAA Division I-AA independent
- 2001–present: Pioneer Football League

== Championships ==
=== Conference championships ===
Morehead State has won two conference championships, one shared and one outright.

Season	Coach	Conference	Overall record	Conference record
1962†	Guy D. Penny	Ohio Valley Conference	5–3	4–2
1966	Guy D. Penny	Ohio Valley Conference	7–2	6–1

† co-champions

=== Divisional championships ===
From 2001 to 2005, the Pioneer Football League was divided into North and South Divisions. As winners of the Pioneer Football League's South Division, Morehead State has made four appearances in the Pioneer Football League Championship Game, in 2002, 2003, 2004, and 2005. Morehead State shared the Division title with Jacksonville in 2004, but the tie-breaker allowed the Eagles to represent the division in the championship game.

Season	Coach	Division	Opponent	Result
2002	Matt Ballard	PFL South	Dayton	L 0–28
2003	Matt Ballard	PFL South	Valparaiso	L 42–54
2004	Matt Ballard	PFL South†	Drake	L 17–20
2005	Matt Ballard	PFL South	San Diego	L 40–47

† Denotes co-champions

== Notable former players ==
Notable alumni include:

- QB Mike Gottfried (1962–1965)
- C Nick Nighswander (1970–1973)
- TE Gary Shirk (1970–1973)
- QB Phil Simms (1975–1978)
- LB Rob Lyttle (1994)
- DB Greg Bright (1976–1980)
- LB Zack Moore (1996–1998)
- QB David Dinkins (1998–2000)
- DB David Hyland (2005–2008)
- DL Derik Steiner (2006–2009)

== Future non-conference opponents ==
Announced schedules as of November 20, 2026.

2027	2028
at Tennessee Tech	at Tennessee Tech
Kentucky Christian	at North Dakota
at North Alabama	
