= 1995 Alabama Crimson Tide football team =

American college football season

1995 Alabama Crimson Tide football
- Conference: Southeastern Conference
- Western Division

Ranking
- AP: No. 21
- Record: 8–3 (5–3 SEC)
- Head coach: Gene Stallings (6th season)
- Offensive coordinator: Homer Smith (2nd season)
- Offensive scheme: Pro-style
- Defensive coordinator: Bill Oliver (3rd season)
- Base defense: 3–4 or 4–3
- Captains: Shannon Brown; Brian Burgdorf; Tony Johnson; John Walters
- Home stadium: Bryant–Denny Stadium; Legion Field

1995 Southeastern Conference football standings
| | Conf. | | | | | Overall |
| Team | W | | L | | T | W | | L | | T |
|---|---|---|---|---|---|---|---|---|---|---|
Eastern Division
| No. 2 Florida x$ | 8 | – | 0 | – | 0 | 12 | – | 1 | – | 0 |
| No. 3 Tennessee | 7 | – | 1 | – | 0 | 11 | – | 1 | – | 0 |
| Georgia | 3 | – | 5 | – | 0 | 6 | – | 6 | – | 0 |
| South Carolina | 2 | – | 5 | – | 1 | 4 | – | 6 | – | 1 |
| Kentucky | 2 | – | 6 | – | 0 | 4 | – | 7 | – | 0 |
| Vanderbilt | 1 | – | 7 | – | 0 | 2 | – | 9 | – | 0 |
Western Division
| Arkansas x | 6 | – | 2 | – | 0 | 8 | – | 5 | – | 0 |
| No. 21 Alabama | 5 | – | 3 | – | 0 | 8 | – | 3 | – | 0 |
| No. 22 Auburn | 5 | – | 3 | – | 0 | 8 | – | 4 | – | 0 |
| LSU | 4 | – | 3 | – | 1 | 7 | – | 4 | – | 1 |
| Ole Miss | 3 | – | 5 | – | 0 | 6 | – | 5 | – | 0 |
| Mississippi State | 1 | – | 7 | – | 0 | 3 | – | 8 | – | 0 |
Championship: Florida 34, Arkansas 3
$ – Conference champion; x – Division champion/co-champions; Rankings from AP Poll

The 1995 Alabama Crimson Tide football team represented the University of Alabama as a member of the Western Division of the Southeastern Conference (SEC) during the 1995 NCAA Division I-A football season. Led by sixth-year head coach Gene Stallings, the Crimson Tide compiled an overall record of 8–3 with a mark of 5–3 in conference play, tying for second place in the SEC's Western Division. Due to National Collegiate Athletic Association (NCAA) sanctions, Alabama was not eligible for postseason play. The team played home games at Bryant–Denny Stadium in Tuscaloosa, Alabama, and Legion Field in Birmingham, Alabama.

The early-season victory over Southern Miss came in dramatic fashion, as Alabama completed a 36-yard pass on a fourth down for a go-ahead touchdown with under 30 seconds left in the game. The three games Alabama lost were also particularly noteworthy. The game against Arkansas featured a last-minute fourth-and-goal touchdown pass by Arkansas, giving them the win; however, replays later showed the ball was clearly not caught. This call, along with a missed 12-men-on-the-field penalty on Arkansas' final drive led to the suspension of the officiating crew the following week. The 41–14 blowout loss to Tennessee marked the Vols' first win over the Tide since 1985, ending Alabama's nine-game unbeaten streak in the rivalry. The season-ending loss at Auburn also featured a questionable last-minute call. Alabama quarterback Freddie Kitchens had apparently hit Curtis Brown for a late go-ahead touchdown, but officials ruled Brown out of bounds.

== Schedule ==
| Date | Time | Opponent | Rank | Site | TV | Result | Attendance | Source |
|---|---|---|---|---|---|---|---|---|
| September 2 | 7:00 p.m. | at Vanderbilt | No. 11 | Vanderbilt Stadium; Nashville, TN | PPV | W 33–25 | 40,880 | |
| September 9 | 2:00 p.m. | Southern Miss* | No. 13 | Legion Field; Birmingham, AL | PPV | W 24–20 | 83,091 | |
| September 16 | 11:30 a.m. | Arkansas | No. 13 | Bryant–Denny Stadium; Tuscaloosa, AL | JPS | L 19–20 | 70,123 | |
| September 30 | 11:00 a.m. | at Georgia | No. 20 | Sanford Stadium; Athens, GA (rivalry) | ABC | W 31–0 | 86,117 | |
| October 7 | 2:30 p.m. | NC State*^{†} | No. 16 | Bryant–Denny Stadium; Tuscaloosa, AL | PPV | W 27–11 | 70,123 | |
| October 14 | 6:30 p.m. | No. 6 Tennessee | No. 11 | Legion Field; Birmingham, AL (Third Saturday in October, College GameDay) | ESPN | L 14–41 | 83,091 | |
| October 21 | 2:00 p.m. | at Ole Miss | No. 21 | Vaught–Hemingway Stadium; Oxford, MS (rivalry) | | W 23–9 | 44,312 | |
| October 28 | 2:30 p.m. | North Texas* | No. 18 | Bryant–Denny Stadium; Tuscaloosa, AL | PPV | W 38–19 | 70,123 | |
| November 4 | 2:30 p.m. | LSU | No. 16 | Bryant–Denny Stadium; Tuscaloosa, AL (rivalry) | ABC | W 10–3 | 70,123 | |
| November 11 | 11:30 a.m. | Mississippi State | No. 16 | Bryant–Denny Stadium; Tuscaloosa, AL (rivalry) | JPS | W 14–9 | 70,123 | |
| November 18 | 4:30 p.m. | at No. 21 Auburn | No. 17 | Jordan–Hare Stadium; Auburn, AL (Iron Bowl, College GameDay) | ESPN | L 27–31 | 85,214 | |
*Non-conference game; ^{†}Homecoming; Rankings from AP Poll released prior to the game; All times are in Central time

== Game summaries ==
=== Vanderbilt ===
| | 1 | 2 | 3 | 4 | Total |
|---|---|---|---|---|---|
| No. 11 Crimson Tide | 7 | 3 | 0 | 23 | 33 |
| Commodores | 7 | 3 | 9 | 6 | 25 |

Despite a sloppy performance that included five turnovers, Alabama found a way to escape. Fueled by a furious 23-point fourth quarter, the Crimson Tide rallied from behind to survive a major upset bid from Vanderbilt.

Trailing 19–10 in the third quarter, Alabama answered with a quick 72-yard, five-play drive, capped by Dennis Riddle's 1-yard touchdown run to cut the deficit to two. Vanderbilt then fumbled on its ensuing possession, setting up a 32-yard field goal by Michael Proctor that gave the Tide a 20–19 lead.

After the defense forced a three-and-out, Alabama appeared poised to seize control. Instead, Riddle fumbled, and Eric Vance scooped up the loose ball and returned it for a touchdown, putting Vanderbilt back in front, 25–20.

The Tide responded immediately with a 58-yard scoring drive, ending with Brian Burgdorf's 4-yard touchdown pass to Toderick Malone to reclaim the lead. Brad Ford then put the game away with his second interception of the night, returning it for a touchdown to seal Alabama's 33–25 victory.

| Statistics | Alabama | Vanderbilt |
|---|---|---|
| First downs | 19 | 10 |
| Total yards | 372 | 208 |
| Rushing yards | 125 | 112 |
| Passing yards | 247 | 96 |
| Turnovers | 5 | 6 |
| Time of possession | 35:35 | 24:25 |

| Team | Category | Player | Statistics |
|---|---|---|---|
| Alabama | Passing | Brian Burgdorf | 17–30, 198 yards, 1 TD, 4 INT's |
| Alabama | Rushing | Dennis Riddle | 29 carries, 69 yards, 1 TD |
| Alabama | Receiving | Toderick Malone | 4 receptions, 66 yards, 1 TD |
| Vanderbilt | Passing | Damian Allen | 8–23, 87 yards, 1 TD, 3 INT's |
| Vanderbilt | Rushing | Jermaine Johnson | 16 carries, 114 yards, 1 TD |
| Vanderbilt | Receiving | Sanford Ware | 3 receptions, 50 yards |

=== Southern Miss ===
| | 1 | 2 | 3 | 4 | Total |
|---|---|---|---|---|---|
| Golden Eagles | 10 | 7 | 0 | 3 | 20 |
| No. 13 Crimson Tide | 0 | 3 | 14 | 7 | 24 |

For the second straight week, Alabama found itself on the verge of an upset—but once again, the Crimson Tide rose to the occasion. Trailing 20–17 late in the fourth quarter and facing a daunting 4th-and-16, Brian Burgdorf delivered under pressure, firing a perfect 35-yard touchdown pass to Toderick Malone. The score gave Alabama its first lead of the day and completed yet another thrilling fourth-quarter comeback, keeping the Crimson Tide's winning ways alive.

| Statistics | Southern Miss | Alabama |
|---|---|---|
| First downs | 14 | 18 |
| Total yards | 259 | 349 |
| Rushing yards | 101 | 84 |
| Passing yards | 158 | 265 |
| Turnovers | 1 | 1 |
| Time of possession | 30:09 | 29:51 |

| Team | Category | Player | Statistics |
|---|---|---|---|
| Southern Miss | Passing | Heath Graham | 15–28, 158 yards 1 TD, 1 INT |
| Southern Miss | Rushing | Eric Booth | 9 carries, 52 yards, 1 TD |
| Southern Miss | Receiving | Ryan Pearson | 4 receptions, 52 yards |
| Alabama | Passing | Brian Burgdorf | 19–27, 265 yards, 3 TD's |
| Alabama | Rushing | Dennis Riddle | 14 carries, 44 yards |
| Alabama | Receiving | Toderick Malone | 5 receptions, 131 yards, 1 TD |

=== Arkansas ===
| | 1 | 2 | 3 | 4 | Total |
|---|---|---|---|---|---|
| Razorbacks | 10 | 0 | 3 | 7 | 20 |
| No. 13 Crimson Tide | 3 | 14 | 2 | 0 | 19 |

Alabama appeared to be in control after a safety extended its lead to nine points in the third quarter, but the Crimson Tide couldn't put the Razorbacks away, ultimately falling to Arkansas for the first time in program history.

The game was also marred by a controversial officiating error in the closing moments—one that resulted in the suspension of the SEC officiating crew the following week. On Arkansas's final drive, the Razorbacks faced second-and-goal from the Alabama 3-yard line. Although the pass fell incomplete, Arkansas had 12 players on the field, a penalty that went uncalled. Had the infraction been enforced, Arkansas would have faced third-and-goal from the 18-yard line instead of remaining at the 3. The missed call significantly improved Arkansas's scoring opportunity and, given Alabama's defensive stand to that point, could have altered the outcome of the game.

| Statistics | Arkansas | Alabama |
|---|---|---|
| First downs | 13 | 11 |
| Total yards | 270 | 213 |
| Rushing yards | 89 | 123 |
| Passing yards | 181 | 90 |
| Turnovers | 0 | 1 |
| Time of possession | 32:39 | 27:21 |

| Team | Category | Player | Statistics |
|---|---|---|---|
| Arkansas | Passing | Barry Lunney Jr. | 15–26, 181 yards, 1 TD |
| Arkansas | Rushing | Madre Hill | 26 carries, 105 yards |
| Arkansas | Receiving | Anthony Eubanks | 3 receptions, 59 yards |
| Alabama | Passing | Brian Burgdorf | 6–17, 90 yards, 1 TD, 1 INT |
| Alabama | Rushing | Dennis Riddle | 22 carries, 57 yards, 1 TD |
| Alabama | Receiving | Curtis Brown | 2 receptions, 55 yards, 1 TD |

=== Georgia ===
| | 1 | 2 | 3 | 4 | Total |
|---|---|---|---|---|---|
| No. 20 Crimson Tide | 3 | 14 | 0 | 14 | 31 |
| Bulldogs | 0 | 0 | 0 | 0 | 0 |

With Georgia playing without its starting quarterback and tailback, Alabama took full advantage, cruising to a 31–0 victory for its first road SEC shutout since 1990.

The Crimson Tide's defense and special teams dominated from start to finish, either scoring points themselves or setting up the offense with excellent field position. Defensive back Cedric Samuel gave Alabama an early boost by returning a fumble 25 yards for a touchdown. Late in the second quarter, as Georgia attempted to cut the deficit to a one-possession game, defensive lineman Shannon Brown blocked a 27-yard field-goal attempt. The loose ball was scooped up by Deshea Townsend, who raced 90 yards for a touchdown to give Alabama complete control heading into halftime. Kevin Jackson later capped the defensive showcase with a 36-yard interception return for another score.

| Statistics | Alabama | Georgia |
|---|---|---|
| First downs | 11 | 15 |
| Total yards | 227 | 213 |
| Rushing yards | 110 | 142 |
| Passing yards | 117 | 71 |
| Turnovers | 0 | 6 |
| Time of possession | 28:18 | 31:42 |

| Team | Category | Player | Statistics |
|---|---|---|---|
| Alabama | Passing | Brian Burgdorf | 7–13, 100 yards |
| Alabama | Rushing | Dennis Riddle | 17 carries, 80 yards, 1 TD |
| Alabama | Receiving | Tony Johnson | 2 receptions, 51 yards |
| Georgia | Passing | Brian Smith | 9–20, 60 yards, 2 INT's |
| Georgia | Rushing | Larry Bowie (running back) | 24 carries, 94 yards |
| Georgia | Receiving | Juan Daniels | 1 reception, 18 yards |

=== North Carolina State ===
| | 1 | 2 | 3 | 4 | Total |
|---|---|---|---|---|---|
| Wolfpack | 0 | 0 | 3 | 8 | 11 |
| No. 16 Crimson Tide | 10 | 3 | 7 | 7 | 27 |

Alabama extended its non-conference winning streak to 19 games with a hard-fought 27–11 Homecoming victory over NC State. The Wolfpack had a chance in the third quarter to trim the deficit to one possession, but a missed field goal proved costly. The Crimson Tide capitalized immediately, marching 73 yards in 10 plays before Brian Burgdorf connected with Dennis Riddle for an 11-yard touchdown pass. The scoring drive stretched Alabama's lead to 17 points and put the game firmly under the Tide's control.

| Statistics | NC State | Alabama |
|---|---|---|
| First downs | 22 | 21 |
| Total yards | 380 | 356 |
| Rushing yards | 159 | 150 |
| Passing yards | 221 | 206 |
| Turnovers | 2 | 2 |
| Time of possession | 32:24 | 27:36 |

| Team | Category | Player | Statistics |
|---|---|---|---|
| NC State | Passing | Terry Harvey | 10–23, 142 yards, 1 INT |
| NC State | Rushing | Tremayne Stephens | 15 carries, 77 yards |
| NC State | Receiving | Mike Guffie | 3 receptions, 51 yards, 1 TD |
| Alabama | Passing | Brian Burgdorf | 17–25, 196 yards, 2 TD's, 1 INT |
| Alabama | Rushing | Dennis Riddle | 18 carries, 85 yards, 1 TD |
| Alabama | Receiving | Toderick Malone | 5 receptions, 61 yards |

=== Tennessee ===
| | 1 | 2 | 3 | 4 | Total |
|---|---|---|---|---|---|
| No. 6 Volunteers | 21 | 7 | 7 | 6 | 41 |
| No. 11 Crimson Tide | 0 | 7 | 7 | 0 | 14 |

Tennessee ended a decade of frustration against Alabama with a commanding 41–14 victory, its first win in the series since 1985. The Volunteers seized control immediately, scoring on the game's first play from scrimmage when Peyton Manning connected with Joey Kent for an 80-yard touchdown. Tennessee added touchdowns on each of its next two possessions and never looked back, overwhelming the Crimson Tide from start to finish.

The 27-point loss marked Alabama's largest defeat at Legion Field since 1969—ironically, also a 41–14 loss to Tennessee.

| Statistics | Tennessee | Alabama |
|---|---|---|
| First downs | 21 | 21 |
| Total yards | 496 | 303 |
| Rushing yards | 167 | 75 |
| Passing yards | 329 | 228 |
| Turnovers | 1 | 5 |
| Time of possession | 30:25 | 29:35 |

| Team | Category | Player | Statistics |
|---|---|---|---|
| Tennessee | Passing | Peyton Manning | 20–29, 301 yards, 3 TD's |
| Tennessee | Rushing | Jay Graham | 17 carries, 114 yards, 1 TD |
| Tennessee | Receiving | Joey Kent | 5 receptions, 117 yards, 1 TD |
| Alabama | Passing | Freddie Kitchens | 20–43, 204 yards, 1 TD, 3 INT's |
| Alabama | Rushing | Dennis Riddle | 13 carries, 60 yards |
| Alabama | Receiving | Curtis Brown | 6 receptions, 61 yards |

=== Ole Miss ===
| | 1 | 2 | 3 | 4 | Total |
|---|---|---|---|---|---|
| No. 21 Crimson Tide | 9 | 7 | 0 | 7 | 23 |
| Rebels | 0 | 0 | 3 | 6 | 9 |

Alabama responded emphatically to its loss to Tennessee with a 23–9 victory over Ole Miss. The Crimson Tide defense set the tone from the opening snap, accounting for the game's first nine points.

On just the second play from scrimmage, Dwayne Rudd sacked Ole Miss quarterback Josh Nelson in the end zone, forcing a fumble that resulted in a safety. The Rebels' next possession proved equally costly, as linebacker Ralph Staten intercepted a Nelson pass and returned it 61 yards for a touchdown, giving Alabama an early 9–0 advantage.

The game's defining moment came late in the first half. After an Ole Miss punt and an Alabama penalty backed the Tide up to its own 2-yard line, the offense responded with one of its most impressive drives of the season. Alabama marched 98 yards in 11 plays, capped by Brian Steger's 4-yard touchdown run, extending the lead and firmly putting the game under the Crimson Tide's control.

| Statistics | Alabama | Ole Miss |
|---|---|---|
| First downs | 12 | 18 |
| Total yards | 239 | 304 |
| Rushing yards | 82 | 83 |
| Passing yards | 157 | 221 |
| Turnovers | 0 | 2 |
| Time of possession | 24:33 | 35:27 |

| Team | Category | Player | Statistics |
|---|---|---|---|
| Alabama | Passing | Brian Burgdorf | 13–24, 157 yards, 1 TD |
| Alabama | Rushing | Dennis Riddle | 15 carries, 53 yards |
| Alabama | Receiving | Toderick Malone | 4 receptions, 73 yards, 1 TD |
| Ole Miss | Passing | Josh Nelson | 19–38, 163 yards, 1 INT |
| Ole Miss | Rushing | Dou Innocent | 20 carries, 52 yards, 1 TD |
| Ole Miss | Receiving | Dou Innocent | 6 receptions, 68 yards |

=== North Texas ===
| | 1 | 2 | 3 | 4 | Total |
|---|---|---|---|---|---|
| Mean Green | 0 | 7 | 6 | 6 | 19 |
| No. 18 Crimson Tide | 0 | 10 | 14 | 14 | 38 |

Alabama finally wore down North Texas in the second half, pulling away for a 38–19 victory to extend its non-conference winning streak to 20 games. Despite entering as a 33-point underdog, the Mean Green gave the Crimson Tide an early scare, limiting Alabama to just 13 yards of offense in the first quarter.

North Texas capitalized on excellent field position following a failed Alabama fake punt to take a 7–0 lead in the second quarter. The Tide finally got on the board late in the half when Cedric Samuel intercepted a pass and returned it for a touchdown, tying the game at 7–7.

Following Samuel's interception return, Alabama seized control by scoring 17 unanswered points to build a 24–7 lead, appearing ready to cruise to victory. North Texas, however, refused to go away, putting together a 67-yard touchdown drive to cut the deficit to 24–13. The Mean Green then caught another break when Alabama muffed a punt, giving them possession in Crimson Tide territory. But just as momentum began to shift, Ralph Staten halted the threat with an interception. Alabama capitalized on the turnover with a methodical 55-yard touchdown drive, restoring a comfortable cushion and putting the game out of reach on the way to a 38–19 victory.

| Statistics | North Texas | Alabama |
|---|---|---|
| First downs | 9 | 20 |
| Total yards | 274 | 465 |
| Rushing yards | 14 | 219 |
| Passing yards | 260 | 246 |
| Turnovers | 4 | 4 |
| Time of possession | 24:03 | 35:57 |

| Team | Category | Player | Statistics |
|---|---|---|---|
| North Texas | Passing | Josh Gulley | 19–37, 183 yards, 1 TD, 2 INT's |
| North Texas | Rushing | Jason Mills | 2 carries, 10 yards, 1 TD |
| North Texas | Receiving | Troy Redwine | 5 receptions, 128 yards, 1 TD |
| Alabama | Passing | Brian Burgdorf | 10–13, 136 yards, 1 TD |
| Alabama | Rushing | Brian Steger | 19 carries, 97 yards |
| Alabama | Receiving | Toderick Malone | 4 receptions, 87 yards, 1 TD |

=== LSU ===
| | 1 | 2 | 3 | 4 | Total |
|---|---|---|---|---|---|
| Tigers | 0 | 3 | 0 | 0 | 3 |
| No. 16 Crimson Tide | 0 | 3 | 0 | 7 | 10 |

Alabama used great defense and just enough offense to defeat LSU 10–3. After Brian Burgdorf was ineffective and threw an interception that led to LSU taking a 3–0 lead, Freddie Kitchens came in and provided a spark to the offense. Dennis Riddle also delivered, becoming the first Alabama player in 1995 to rush for more than 100 yards. Together, they engineered a 13-play, 87-yard drive that was capped by a field goal from Michael Proctor, tying the game at 3–3 heading into halftime. After missing two field-goal attempts in the third quarter, Alabama finally capitalized on a turnover when Deshea Townsend delivered a game-changing interception, snatching a Jamie Howard pass and returning it 17 yards deep into LSU territory. Moments later, Riddle powered through for a 2-yard touchdown run, giving Alabama its first lead of the game and providing the clutch score that sealed the Crimson Tide’s hard-fought 10–3 victory.

| Statistics | LSU | Alabama |
|---|---|---|
| First downs | 12 | 17 |
| Total yards | 232 | 337 |
| Rushing yards | 102 | 210 |
| Passing yards | 130 | 127 |
| Turnovers | 3 | 4 |
| Time of possession | 28:09 | 31:51 |

| Team | Category | Player | Statistics |
|---|---|---|---|
| LSU | Passing | Jamie Howard | 10–23, 127 yards, 2 INT's |
| LSU | Rushing | Kevin Faulk | 23 carries, 75 yards |
| LSU | Receiving | Sheddrick Wilson | 6 receptions, 81 yards |
| Alabama | Passing | Freddie Kitchens | 6–16, 93 yards, 1 INT |
| Alabama | Rushing | Dennis Riddle | 33 carries, 174 yards, 1 TD |
| Alabama | Receiving | Curtis Brown | 4 receptions, 64 yards |

=== Mississippi State ===
| | 1 | 2 | 3 | 4 | Total |
|---|---|---|---|---|---|
| Bulldogs | 2 | 7 | 0 | 0 | 9 |
| No. 16 Crimson Tide | 0 | 7 | 7 | 0 | 14 |

Freddie Kitchens made his first start at quarterback for Alabama as the Tide relied on a stout defense and smart clock management to secure a 14–9 victory over Mississippi State. Wet and muddy field conditions played a factor, as Michael Proctor missed three field-goal attempts in the first half, extending his streak to five consecutive misses dating back to the previous game. A bad snap on a punt that sailed through the end zone, combined with a short-field opportunity, gave Mississippi State a chance to jump out to a 9–0 lead.

Dennis Riddle once again provided the spark for the Alabama offense, rushing for over 100 yards for the second consecutive game. Riddle also scored both of Alabama’s touchdowns, finding the end zone once in the second quarter and again in the third to help the Tide overcome the early deficit and secure the 14–9 victory.

| Statistics | Mississippi State | Alabama |
|---|---|---|
| First downs | 8 | 22 |
| Total yards | 135 | 324 |
| Rushing yards | 94 | 249 |
| Passing yards | 41 | 75 |
| Turnovers | 2 | 0 |
| Time of possession | 19:33 | 40:27 |

| Team | Category | Player | Statistics |
|---|---|---|---|
| Mississippi State | Passing | Derrick Taite | 8–16, 41 yards, 1 TD, 2 INT's |
| Mississippi State | Rushing | Keffer McGee | 18 carries, 78 yards |
| Mississippi State | Receiving | Eric Moulds | 4 receptions, 25 yards, 1 TD |
| Alabama | Passing | Freddie Kitchens | 8–10, 75 yards |
| Alabama | Rushing | Dennis Riddle | 38 carries, 181 yards, 2 TD's |
| Alabama | Receiving | Curtis Brown | 2 receptions, 25 yards |

=== Auburn ===
| | 1 | 2 | 3 | 4 | Total |
|---|---|---|---|---|---|
| No. 17 Crimson Tide | 14 | 0 | 10 | 3 | 27 |
| No. 21 Tigers | 14 | 10 | 0 | 7 | 31 |

Despite racking up a season-high 478 yards of offense and mounting a valiant second-half comeback, Alabama fell short against Auburn, extending its losing streak at Jordan–Hare Stadium to three games.

Despite experts predicting a defensive struggle, both offenses put on a showcase in the first quarter, scoring two touchdowns apiece. Auburn struck first on a 29-yard touchdown pass from Patrick Nix to Stephen Davis, but Alabama answered immediately when Freddie Kitchens connected with Toderick Malone on a 52-yard touchdown pass to tie the game at 7–7. Auburn responded with a 67-yard scoring drive, capped by a one-yard touchdown run from Dameyune Craig to reclaim the lead. Alabama answered again, this time with Malone breaking free for a 59-yard touchdown run to once again tie the game.

Auburn would score twice in the second quarter to take a 10-point lead. Alabama attempted a field goal late in the first half to cut the deficit to one possession, but for the sixth consecutive time, Michael Proctor missed, this time from 35 yards, sending the Tide into halftime trailing by 10.

Proctor finally ended the streak in the third quarter, converting a 20-yard field goal. Alabama then followed with a 65-yard scoring drive on its next possession, tying the game at 24 heading into the fourth quarter.

Alabama took its first lead of the game early in the fourth quarter when Proctor connected on a 36-yard field goal. Auburn answered on its next possession, however, with Fred Beasley breaking free for a 22-yard touchdown run to reclaim the lead.

The Tide had opportunities to respond, driving into Auburn territory twice after falling behind, but could not find the end zone. Alabama nearly pulled off the comeback on the last drive when Kitchens connected with Curtis Brown for a 36-yard completion, but Brown was unable to get his foot down in bounds. The pass was correctly ruled incomplete, ending Alabama's final serious scoring opportunity and sealing the Auburn victory.

| Statistics | Alabama | Auburn |
|---|---|---|
| First downs | 22 | 18 |
| Total yards | 478 | 354 |
| Rushing yards | 176 | 95 |
| Passing yards | 302 | 259 |
| Turnovers | 1 | 0 |
| Time of possession | 29:26 | 30:34 |

| Team | Category | Player | Statistics |
|---|---|---|---|
| Alabama | Passing | Freddie Kitchens | 19–43, 302 yards, 1 TD |
| Alabama | Rushing | Dennis Riddle | 20 carries, 86 yards |
| Alabama | Receiving | Toderick Malone | 7 receptions, 106 yards, 1 TD |
| Auburn | Passing | Patrick Nix | 18–36, 259 yards, 2 TD's |
| Auburn | Rushing | Stephen Davis | 22 carries, 80 yards |
| Auburn | Receiving | Errick Lowe | 3 receptions, 66 yards |

== Personnel ==
=== Coaching staff ===
| Name | Position | Consecutive seasons at Alabama |
|---|---|---|
| Gene Stallings | Head coach | 6th |
| Homer Smith | Offensive coordinator | 2nd |
| Woody McCorvey | Wide receivers Coach | 6th |
| Danny Pearman | Offensive tackles coach/Special teams coordinator | 5th |
| Jim Fuller | Offensive line coach | 12th |
| Randy Ross | Quarterbacks coach/Recruiting Coordinator | 6th |
| Ivy Williams | Running backs coach | 2nd |
| Bill Oliver | Defensive coordinator/Secondary coach | 6th |
| Mike Dubose | Defensive line coach | 6th |
| Jeff Rouzie | Linebackers coach | 5th |

=== Roster ===
1995 Alabama Crimson Tide football team roster
| Players | | | Coaches |
|---|---|---|---|
| Offense: Pos. / # / Name / Class; QB / 9 / Freddie Kitchens / So | Defense: Pos. / # / Name / Class; LB / 87 / Dwayne Rudd / Jr | Special teams: Pos. / # / Name / Class | Head coach: Gene Stallings; Coordinators/assistant coaches Legend: (C) Team captain; (S) Suspended; (I) Ineligible; Injured; Redshirt |
