= 1995 All-SEC football team =

American college football all-star team

The 1995 All-SEC football team consists of American football players selected to the All-Southeastern Conference (SEC) chosen by various selectors for the 1995 NCAA Division I-A football season. The selectors for the 1995 season included the Associated Press (AP) and the conference coaches (Coaches).

Three teams dominated the All-SEC selections with more than five honorees, as follows:

- Conference champion Florida was ranked No. 2 in the final AP Poll and placed 11 players among the first- or second-team All-SEC teams. Six Florida players were selected as first-team players by both the AP and Coaches: wide receiver Chris Doering, offensive linemen Reggie Green and Jason Odom, defensive end Mark Campbell, linebacker Ben Hanks, and defensive back Lawrence Wright. Quarterback Danny Wuerffel was selected as a first-team player by the AP and was voted SEC Player of the Year.
- Tennessee was ranked No. 3 in the final AP Poll and placed 10 players among the first- and second-team selections. Tennessee's honorees included quarterback Peyton Manning (Coaches-1) and wide receiver Joey Kent (AP-1).
- Arkansas won the SEC Western Division and placed six players among the first- and second-team honorees. The Arkansas honorees included running back Madre Hill (AP-1, Coaches-1) and linebacker Mark Smith (AP-1, Coaches-1).

== Offensive selections ==
=== Quarterbacks ===
- Danny Wuerffel, Florida (AP-1, Coaches-2)
- Peyton Manning, Tennessee (AP-2, Coaches-1)

=== Running backs ===
- Moe Williams, Kentucky (AP-1, Coaches-1)
- Madre Hill, Arkansas (AP-1, Coaches-1)

=== Wide receivers ===
- Chris Doering*, Florida (AP-1, Coaches-1)
- Eric Moulds, Miss. St. (AP-2, Coaches-1)
- Joey Kent, Tennessee (AP-1)
- Ike Hilliard, Florida (AP-2, Coaches-2)
- Eddie Kennison, LSU (Coaches-2)
- Sheddrick Wilson, LSU (Coaches-2)

=== Centers ===
- Shannon Roubique, Auburn (AP-1, Coaches-2)
- Jeff Smith, Tennessee (AP-2, Coaches-1)

=== Guards ===
- Reggie Green, Florida (AP-1, Coaches-1)
- Bubba Miller, Tennessee (AP-1, Coaches-2)
- Donnie Young, Florida (AP-2, Coaches-2)
- Verl Mitchell, Arkansas (AP-2, Coaches-2)
- Paul Taylor, Georgia (AP-2)

=== Tackles ===
- Jason Odom*, Florida (AP-1, Coaches-1)
- Jason Layman, Tennessee (AP-1, Coaches-1)
- Willie Anderson, Auburn (AP-2, Coaches-1)
- Troy Stark, Georgia (AP-2, Coaches-2)
- James Dexter, South Carolina (AP-2)

=== Tight ends ===
- Kris Mangum, Ole Miss (AP-1, Coaches-2)
- Andy Fuller, Auburn (AP-2, Coaches-1)

== Defensive selections ==
=== Ends ===
- Mark Campbell, Florida (AP-1, Coaches-1)
- Gabe Northern, LSU (AP-1, Coaches-1 [as LB])
- Leonard Little, Tennessee (AP-2)
- Steve Conley, Arkansas (AP-2, Coaches-1)

=== Tackles ===
- Shannon Brown, Alabama (AP-1, Coaches-1)
- James Manley, Vanderbilt (AP-1, Coaches-2)
- Shane Burton, Tennessee (AP-2, Coaches-2)
- Chuck Wiley, LSU (AP-2)
- Eric Sullivan, South Carolina (AP-2)

=== Middle guards ===
- Junior Soli, Arkansas (AP-2, Coaches-2)

=== Linebackers ===
- Mark Smith, Arkansas (AP-1, Coaches-1)
- Ben Hanks, Florida (AP-1, Coaches-1)
- Marcellus Mostella, Auburn (AP-1, Coaches-2)
- Dexter Daniels, Florida (AP-2, Coaches-1)
- Dwayne Curry, Miss. St. (AP-2, Coaches-2)
- John Walters, Alabama (AP-2, Coaches-2)
- Whit Marshall, Georgia (AP-2)
- Scott Galyon, Tennessee (AP-2)
- Phillip Daniels, Georgia (Coaches-2)

=== Defensive backs ===
- Lawrence Wright, Florida (AP-1, Coaches-1)
- Walt Harris, Miss. St. (AP-1, Coaches-1)
- DeRon Jenkins, Tennessee (AP-1, Coaches-1)
- Anthone Lott, Florida (AP-2, Coaches-1)
- Kevin Jackson, Alabama (AP-1)
- Reggie Rusk, Kentucky (AP-2, Coaches-2)
- Deshea Townsend, Alabama (AP-2)
- Corey Johnson, Georgia (Coaches-2)
- Ben Washington, South Carolina (Coaches-2)
- Tracy Cantlope, Arkansas (Coaches-2)

== Special teams ==
=== Kickers ===
- Jeff Hall, Tennessee (AP-2, Coaches-1)
- Matt Hawkins, Auburn (AP-1)
- Michael Proctor, Alabama (Coaches-2)

=== Punters ===
- Chad Kessler, LSU (AP-1, Coaches-1)
- Bill Marinangel, Vanderbilt (AP-2, Coaches-2)

== Key ==
Bold = Consensus first-team selection by both the coaches and AP

AP = Associated Press

Coaches = Selected by the SEC coaches

* = unanimous selection by AP

== See also ==
- 1995 College Football All-America Team
