= Jason Odom =

American football player (born 1974)

No. 70
- Position: Offensive tackle

Personal information
- Born: March 31, 1974 (age 52); Winter Haven, Florida, U.S.
- Listed height: 6 ft 5 in (1.96 m)
- Listed weight: 307 lb (139 kg)

Career information
- High school: Bartow (Bartow, Florida)
- College: Florida
- NFL draft: 1996: 4th round, 96th overall pick

Career history
- Tampa Bay Buccaneers (1996–2000)

Awards and highlights
- Unanimous All-American (1995); Third-team All-American (1994); 2× Jacobs Blocking Trophy (1994, 1995); 2× First-team All-SEC (1994, 1995); Second-team All-SEC (1993); University of Florida Athletic Hall of Fame

Career NFL statistics
- Games played: 46
- Games started: 41
- Fumble recoveries: 1
- Stats at Pro Football Reference

Jason Brian Odom (born March 31, 1974) is an American former professional football player who was an offensive tackle for four seasons in the National Football League (NFL) during the 1990s. Odom played college football for the Florida Gators, earning unanimous All-American honors in 1995. He played professionally for the NFL's Tampa Bay Buccaneers.

== Early life ==
Odom was born in Winter Haven, Florida in 1974. He attended Bartow High School in Bartow, Florida,

== College career ==
Odom accepted an athletic scholarship to attend the University of Florida in Gainesville, Florida, where he was an offensive lineman for coach Steve Spurrier's Florida Gators football team from 1992 to 1995. Odom was a four-year starter, a senior team captain in 1995, a first-team All-Southeastern Conference (SEC) selection in 1994 and 1995, and a unanimous first-team All-American in 1995. In his four years as a Gator, the team won three consecutive SEC championships (1993, 1994, 1995), and played for a Bowl Alliance national championship in the 1996 Fiesta Bowl. He was also the recipient of the SEC's Jacobs Blocking Trophy, recognizing the best blocker in the SEC, in 1994 and 1995.

Odom graduated from Florida with a bachelor's degree in exercise and sports science in 1996. In one of a series of articles written for The Gainesville Sun in 2006, the newspaper's sports editors selected him as No. 28 of the top 100 Gators from the first 100 years of Florida football. He was inducted into the University of Florida Athletic Hall of Fame as a "Gator Great" in 2010.

== Professional career ==
Odom was chosen in the fourth round (96th overall) of the 1996 NFL draft by the Tampa Bay Buccaneers. He played offensive tackle for the Buccaneers for four seasons from 1996 to 1999. He started forty-one of the forty-six Buccaneers games in which he played. He was placed on injured reserve on August 27, 2000, ending his career.

== Life after football ==
Odom has served as a Hillsborough County Sheriff's Deputy in Tampa, Florida since 2008.

== See also ==
- 1995 College Football All-America Team
- Florida Gators football
- History of the Tampa Bay Buccaneers
- List of Florida Gators football All-Americans
- List of Florida Gators in the NFL draft
- List of SEC Jacobs Blocking Trophy winners
- List of University of Florida alumni
- University of Florida Athletic Hall of Fame
