= Lawrence Wright (American football) =

American football player (born 1973)

No. 42
- Position: Safety

Personal information
- Born: September 6, 1973 (age 53); Miami, Florida, U.S.
- Listed height: 6 ft 2 in (1.88 m)
- Listed weight: 209 lb (95 kg)

Career information
- High school: North Miami (FL)
- College: Florida
- NFL draft: 1997: undrafted

Career history
- Cincinnati Bengals (1997-1999)

Awards and highlights
- Bowl Alliance national champion (1996); Jim Thorpe Award (1996); Second-team All-American (1995); 2× First-team All-SEC (1995, 1996); SEC Championship (1993, 1994, 1995, 1996); Florida–Georgia Hall of Fame; University of Florida Athletic Hall of Fame
- Stats at Pro Football Reference

Lawrence D. Wright, III (born September 6, 1973) is an American former professional football player who was a safety for two seasons with the Cincinnati Bengals of the National Football League (NFL) during the 1990s. Wright played college football for the Florida Gators, winning a national championship in 1997. Thereafter, he played in the NFL for the Bengals.

== Early life ==
Wright was born in Miami, Florida in 1973. He attended North Miami High School and Valley Forge Military Academy in Wayne, Pennsylvania.

== College career ==
Wright accepted an athletic scholarship to attend the University of Florida in Gainesville, Florida, where he played for coach Steve Spurrier's Florida Gators football team from 1993 to 1996. He led the Gators with 109 tackles as a junior in 1995. During Wright's senior season in 1996, Wright was one of the team captains and the Gators posted a 12–1 record and won the 1996 Bowl Alliance national championship by defeating the top-ranked Florida State Seminoles 52–20 in the 1997 Sugar Bowl. That same year, he also won the Jim Thorpe Award, recognizing the best defensive back in college football, and was a first-team All-Southeastern Conference (SEC) selection in 1995 and 1996. He finished his Gator career with 331 tackles, five interceptions, eight forced fumbles and four fumbles recoveries.

Wright was named to the SEC Academic Honor Roll for four consecutive years, and was a CFA Scholar-Athlete in 1996. He graduated from Florida with a bachelor's degree in building construction in 1997, and was inducted into the University of Florida Athletic Hall of Fame as a "Gator Great" in 2007.

Gators fans also remember Wright for leading the cheer "If you ain't a Gator, you must be Gator bait!" during a large celebration at Florida Field following Florida's 1996 national championship. As an alumnus, he returned to Gainesville to lead the same cheer during celebrations after the Gators' national championships in 2006 and 2008

== Professional career ==
Wright was undrafted in the 1997 NFL draft, but was signed by the Cincinnati Bengals as a free agent. He played in eighteen regular season games for the Bengals during the 1997 and 1999 seasons, He appeared in four regular season games as a rookie and fourteen games in 1999, but was released by the Bengals before the beginning of the 2000 season.

== Life after football ==
After retiring from professional football, Wright formed a construction and real estate development company, Wright & Partners, in South Florida.

== See also ==
- History of the Cincinnati Bengals
- List of University of Florida alumni
- List of University of Florida Athletic Hall of Fame members
