= 1995 LSU Tigers football team =

American college football season

1995 LSU Tigers football

Independence Bowl champion

Independence Bowl, W 45–26 vs. Michigan State
- Conference: Southeastern Conference
- Western Division

Ranking
- Coaches: No. 25
- Record: 7–4–1 (4–3–1 SEC)
- Head coach: Gerry DiNardo (1st season)
- Offensive coordinator: Morris Watts (1st season)
- Offensive scheme: Multiple
- Defensive coordinator: Carl Reese (1st season)
- Base defense: 4–3
- Captain: Sheddrick Wilson
- Home stadium: Tiger Stadium

1995 Southeastern Conference football standings
	Conf.					Overall
Team	W		L		T	W		L		T
Eastern Division
No. 2 Florida x$	8	–	0	–	0	12	–	1	–	0
No. 3 Tennessee	7	–	1	–	0	11	–	1	–	0
Georgia	3	–	5	–	0	6	–	6	–	0
South Carolina	2	–	5	–	1	4	–	6	–	1
Kentucky	2	–	6	–	0	4	–	7	–	0
Vanderbilt	1	–	7	–	0	2	–	9	–	0
Western Division
Arkansas x	6	–	2	–	0	8	–	5	–	0
No. 21 Alabama	5	–	3	–	0	8	–	3	–	0
No. 22 Auburn	5	–	3	–	0	8	–	4	–	0
LSU	4	–	3	–	1	7	–	4	–	1
Ole Miss	3	–	5	–	0	6	–	5	–	0
Mississippi State	1	–	7	–	0	3	–	8	–	0
Championship: Florida 34, Arkansas 3
$ – Conference champion; x – Division champion/co-champions; Rankings from AP Poll

The 1995 LSU Tigers football team represented Louisiana State University in the sport of American football for the 1995 NCAA Division I-A football season. Coached by Gerry DiNardo in his first season at LSU, the Tigers played their home games at Tiger Stadium in Baton Rouge, Louisiana. The team won seven games, lost four, and had one tie. It concluded the season with a 45–26 win over Michigan State in the 1995 Independence Bowl.

The 45 points scored by LSU in their bowl win over the Spartans was the second-most points (behind Drew Brees and Purdue's 52 points in 1999) allowed by a Nick Saban coached team until the 2019 LSU Tigers put up 46 against Saban's Alabama squad (which was also the most points surrendered by any Alabama team at home in regulation).

The Tigers broke out purple pants for its game at Kentucky, but lost 24-16. The pants were immediately retired.

LSU's 20-20 tie vs. South Carolina became the last involving an SEC team when the NCAA adopted overtime the next season.

LSU did not play in-state rival Tulane in the Battle for the Rag for the first time since 1910 (not counting 1918, when both teams canceled their seasons during the height of U.S. involvement in World War I).

== Schedule ==
Date	Time	Opponent	Rank	Site	TV	Result	Attendance	Source
September 2	2:30 p.m.	at No. 3 Texas A&M*		Kyle Field; College Station, TX (rivalry)	ABC	L 17–33	70,057	
September 9	11:30 a.m.	at Mississippi State		Scott Field; Starkville, MS (rivalry)	JPS	W 34–16	36,110	
September 16	7:00 p.m.	No. 5 Auburn		Tiger Stadium; Baton Rouge, LA (rivalry)		W 12–6	80,559	
September 23	7:00 p.m.	Rice*^{†}	No. 18	Tiger Stadium; Baton Rouge, LA		W 52–7	73,342	
September 30	11:30 a.m.	at South Carolina	No. 14	Williams–Brice Stadium; Columbia, SC	JPS	T 20–20	67,902	
October 7	11:30 a.m.	No. 3 Florida	No. 21	Tiger Stadium; Baton Rouge, LA (rivalry)	JPS	L 10–28	80,583	
October 14	6:00 p.m.	at Kentucky		Commonwealth Stadium; Lexington, KY	PPV	L 16–24	51,500	
October 21	7:00 p.m.	North Texas*		Tiger Stadium; Baton Rouge, LA		W 49–7	66,870	
November 4	2:30 p.m.	at No. 16 Alabama		Bryant–Denny Stadium; Tuscaloosa, AL (rivalry)	ABC	L 3–10	70,123	
November 11	7:00 p.m.	Ole Miss		Tiger Stadium; Baton Rouge, LA (Magnolia Bowl)		W 38–9	78,246	
November 18	2:30 p.m.	No. 14 Arkansas		Tiger Stadium; Baton Rouge, LA (rivalry)	ABC	W 28–0	66,548	
December 29	4:30 p.m.	vs. Michigan State*		Independence Stadium; Shreveport, LA (Independence Bowl)	ESPN	W 45–26	48,835	
*Non-conference game; ^{†}Homecoming; Rankings from AP Poll released prior to the game; All times are in Central time

== Roster ==
1995 LSU Tigers football team roster
Players
Coaches
Offense

Pos.	#	Name	Class
RB	1	Jermaine Sharp	Jr
WR	2	Eddie Kennison	Jr
RB	3	Kevin Faulk	Fr
QB	4	Jamie Howard	Sr
WR	5	Eric Smith	Sr
WR	6	Sheddrick Wilson	Sr
QB	14	Herb Tyler	Fr
TE	47	David LaFleur	Jr
G	66	Alan Faneca	Fr

Defense

Pos.	#	Name	Class
CB	8	Tory James	Sr
CB	24	Denard Walker	Jr
S	33	Raion Hill	Fr
LB	48	Joe Wesley	Fr
DE	88	Gabe Northern	Sr

Special teams

Pos.	#	Name	Class

Head coach

- Gerry DiNardo

Coordinators/assistant coaches

- Morris Watts – Offensive coordinator/quarterbacks
- Michael Haywood – Running backs
- Bob McConnell – Wide receiver
- Bill Elias Jr. – Tight ends
- Hal Hunter – Offensive line
- Carl Reese – Defensive coordinator/linebackers
- Jerry Baldwin – Defensive ends
- Mike Tolleson – Defensive tackles
- Ron Case – Defensive backs
- Bo Davis – Graduate assistant

Legend

- (C) Team captain
- (S) Suspended
- (I) Ineligible
- Injured
- Redshirt

Roster
