= 1995 Vanderbilt Commodores football team =

American college football season

1995 Vanderbilt Commodores football
- Conference: Southeastern Conference
- Record: 2–9 (1–7 SEC)
- Head coach: Rod Dowhower (1st season)
- Offensive coordinator: Rennie Simmons (1st season)
- Defensive coordinator: Woody Widenhofer (1st season)
- Home stadium: Vanderbilt Stadium

1995 Southeastern Conference football standings
	Conf.					Overall
Team	W		L		T	W		L		T
Eastern Division
No. 2 Florida x$	8	–	0	–	0	12	–	1	–	0
No. 3 Tennessee	7	–	1	–	0	11	–	1	–	0
Georgia	3	–	5	–	0	6	–	6	–	0
South Carolina	2	–	5	–	1	4	–	6	–	1
Kentucky	2	–	6	–	0	4	–	7	–	0
Vanderbilt	1	–	7	–	0	2	–	9	–	0
Western Division
Arkansas x	6	–	2	–	0	8	–	5	–	0
No. 21 Alabama	5	–	3	–	0	8	–	3	–	0
No. 22 Auburn	5	–	3	–	0	8	–	4	–	0
LSU	4	–	3	–	1	7	–	4	–	1
Ole Miss	3	–	5	–	0	6	–	5	–	0
Mississippi State	1	–	7	–	0	3	–	8	–	0
Championship: Florida 34, Arkansas 3
$ – Conference champion; x – Division champion/co-champions; Rankings from AP Poll

The 1995 Vanderbilt Commodores football team represented Vanderbilt University as a member of the Eastern Division of the Southeastern Conference (SEC) during the 1995 NCAA Division I-A football season. Led by first-year head coach Rod Dowhower, the Commodores compiled an overall record of 2–9 with a mark of 1–7 in conference play, placing last out of six team in the SEC's Eastern Division. The team played home games at Vanderbilt Stadium in Nashville, Tennessee.

== Schedule ==
Date	Opponent	Site	Result	Attendance	Source
September 2	No. 11 Alabama	Vanderbilt Stadium; Nashville, TN	L 25–33	40,880	
September 16	at No. 24 Notre Dame*	Notre Dame Stadium; Notre Dame, IN	L 0–41	59,075	
September 23	TCU*	Vanderbilt Stadium; Nashville, TN	L 3–16	30,652	
September 30	No. 23 Arkansas	Vanderbilt Stadium; Nashville, TN	L 7–35	25,981	
October 14	Georgia	Vanderbilt Stadium; Nashville, TN (rivalry)	L 6–17	24,986	
October 21	at South Carolina	Williams–Brice Stadium; Columbia, SC	L 14–52	68,915	
October 28	at Ole Miss	Vaught–Hemingway Stadium; Oxford, MS (rivalry)	L 10–21	30,317	
November 4	Kentucky	Vanderbilt Stadium; Nashville, TN (rivalry)	W 14–10	26,053	
November 11	Louisiana Tech*	Vanderbilt Stadium; Nashville, TN	W 29–6	16,101	
November 18	at No. 3 Florida	Ben Hill Griffin Stadium; Gainesville, FL	L 7–38	85,248	
November 25	at No. 5 Tennessee	Neyland Stadium; Knoxville, TN (rivalry)	L 7–12	92,274	
*Non-conference game; Rankings from AP Poll released prior to the game

== Roster ==
1995 Vanderbilt Commodores football team roster
Players
Coaches
Offense

Pos.	#	Name	Class
OL		Allen DeGraffenreid
QB		Ronnie Gordon
RB		Jermaine Johnson
WR		Duane Todd
WR		Sanford Ware

Defense

Pos.	#	Name	Class
LB		Carlton Hall

Special teams

Pos.	#	Name	Class

Head coach

- Rod Dowhower

Coordinators/assistant coaches

Legend

- (C) Team captain
- (S) Suspended
- (I) Ineligible
- Injured
- Redshirt
