= Deshea Townsend =

American football player and coach (born 1975)

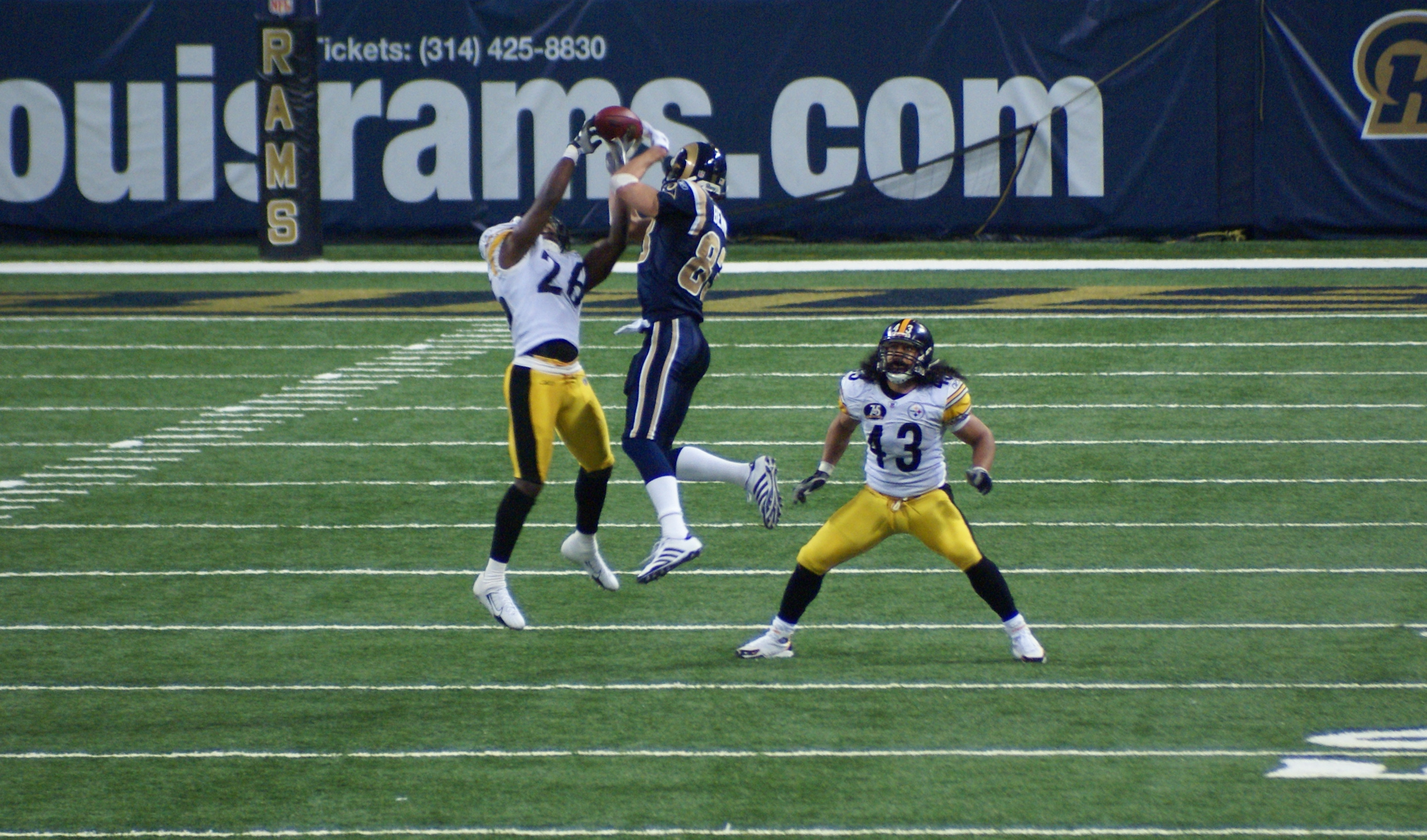
- Townsend (left) with the Pittsburgh Steelers in 2007

Detroit Lions
- Title: Defensive passing game coordinator & Defensive backs coach

Personal information
- Born: September 8, 1975 (age 51); Batesville, Mississippi, U.S.
- Listed height: 5 ft 10 in (1.78 m)
- Listed weight: 190 lb (86 kg)

Career information
- Position: Cornerback (No. 26, 23)
- High school: South Panola (Batesville)
- College: Alabama
- NFL draft: 1998: 4th round, 117th overall pick

Career history

Playing
- Pittsburgh Steelers (1998–2009); Indianapolis Colts (2010)

Coaching
- Arizona Cardinals (2011–2012) Assistant defensive backs coach; Mississippi State (2013–2015) Cornerbacks coach; Tennessee Titans (2016–2017) Defensive backs coach; New York Giants (2018) Assistant defensive backs coach; Chicago Bears (2019–2021) Secondary coach; Jacksonville Jaguars (2022–2023) Passing game coordinator & cornerbacks coach; Detroit Lions (2024–present) Passing game coordinator & defensive backs coach

Awards and highlights
- 2× Super Bowl champion (XL, XLIII); First-team All-SEC (1996); 2× Second-team All-SEC (1995, 1997)

Career NFL statistics
- Tackles: 470
- Sacks: 15.5
- Forced fumbles: 5
- Fumble recoveries: 4
- Pass deflections: 112
- Interceptions: 21
- Defensive touchdowns: 3
- Stats at Pro Football Reference

Trevor Deshea Townsend (born September 8, 1975) is an American professional football coach and former cornerback who currently is the defensive backs coach and defensive pass game coordinator for the Detroit Lions of the National Football League (NFL). He previously worked as an assistant coach for the Jacksonville Jaguars, Chicago Bears, New York Giants, Tennessee Titans, and Arizona Cardinals.

Townsend played college football for the Alabama Crimson Tide and was selected by the Pittsburgh Steelers in the fourth round (117th overall) in the 1998 NFL draft, where he spent his entire career, besides his final year with the Indianapolis Colts.

== Early life ==
A native of Batesville, Mississippi, Townsend played high school football for the South Panola Tigers, where he was the teammate of fellow future Alabama Crimson Tide star Dwayne Rudd. Townsend played quarterback at South Panola and led the team to the 1993 Mississippi State 5A championship and an undefeated 15–0 record.

== Playing career ==
=== College ===
Along with Rudd, Townsend continued his career in college at the University of Alabama where both became members of the Theta Delta Chapter of the Phi Beta Sigma fraternity, in 1995. He majored in business management.

He had seven career interceptions at Alabama. In 1995 at Georgia, Townsend returned a blocked field goal attempt 90 yards for a touchdown in a 31–0 win.

Townsend was named All-SEC in 1995, 1996, and 1997.

=== National Football League ===
Pre-draft measurables
Height	Weight	Arm length	Hand span	40-yard dash	10-yard split	20-yard split	20-yard shuttle	Three-cone drill	Vertical jump	Broad jump	Bench press
5 ft 9 1/4 in (1.76 m)	179 lb (81 kg)	31 3/4 in (0.81 m)	8 3/4 in (0.22 m)	4.59 s	1.73 s	2.75 s	3.95 s	7.43 s	38.0 in (0.97 m)	9 ft 8 in (2.95 m)	10 reps

==== Pittsburgh Steelers ====
The Pittsburgh Steelers selected Townsend in the fourth round (117th overall) of the 1998 NFL draft. He was the 14th cornerback drafted in 1998.

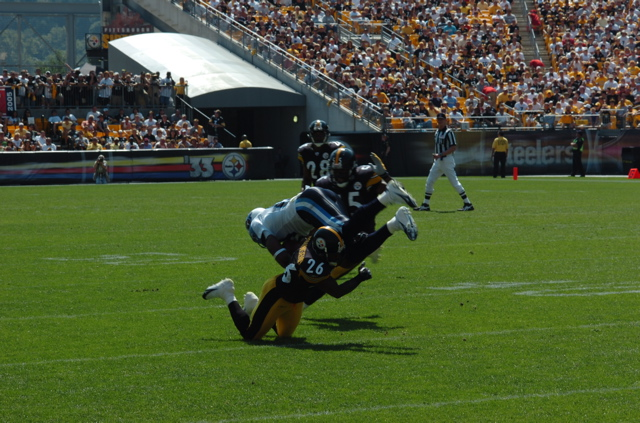
Townsend (#26) making a tackle in 2005

Townsend grew from a special teams player and nickelback (and initially known in Pittsburgh as the first player to wear Rod Woodson's number 26 after left the Steelers), into a solid starter for the Pittsburgh Steelers at cornerback. Townsend was known for his outside speed as a pass rusher. Townsend has recorded 322 tackles, 15.5 quarterback sacks and 18 interceptions during his twelve years as a Steeler. He also had a key sack on Seattle quarterback Matt Hasselbeck during the final minutes of Super Bowl XL, which helped secure the Steelers eventual victory.

On March 22, 2002, the Pittsburgh Steelers signed Townsend to a four-year, $4.20 million contract as an unrestricted free agent that included a signing bonus of $1 million. He visited with the Tampa Bay Buccaneers during free agency and his agent was also contacted by the New England Patriots, Houston Texans, and Atlanta Falcons.

On March 17, 2006, the Pittsburgh Steelers signed Townsend to a four-year, $8 million contract that included a signing bonus of $2 million. He received the contract offer during a visit with the New England Patriots.

During the 2008 season, Townsend accepted the reduced role from starting cornerback to the nickel package.

==== Indianapolis Colts ====
In August 2010, Townsend joined the Indianapolis Colts. On November 9, 2010, he was waived by the Colts. For the season, Townsend played in eight Colts games with no starts, and totaled 10 tackles and no interceptions or sacks.

== NFL career statistics ==
Legend
	Won the Super Bowl
**Bold**	Career high

=== Regular season ===
Year	Team	Games		Tackles				Interceptions				Fumbles			
Year	Team	GP	GS	Comb	Solo	Ast	Sck	Int	Yds	TD	Lng	FF	FR	Yds	TD
1998	PIT	12	0	11	9	2	0.0	0	0	0	0	0	0	0	0
1999	PIT	16	4	38	33	5	0.0	0	0	0	0	0	0	0	0
2000	PIT	16	0	38	28	10	3.5	0	0	0	0	0	0	0	0
2001	PIT	16	1	29	24	5	2.0	2	7	0	7	0	0	0	0
2002	PIT	16	3	47	40	7	0.0	3	3	0	2	0	0	0	0
2003	PIT	16	8	46	39	7	1.0	3	24	**1**	25	1	**1**	0	0
2004	PIT	15	15	**56**	**47**	9	**4.0**	**4**	**54**	**1**	**39**	1	**1**	0	0
2005	PIT	16	15	55	41	**14**	3.0	2	26	0	26	1	**1**	**2**	0
2006	PIT	16	12	41	37	4	2.0	2	6	0	6	**2**	0	0	0
2007	PIT	16	16	52	45	7	0.0	2	44	0	23	0	0	0	0
2008	PIT	12	4	20	16	4	0.0	2	27	**1**	25	0	**1**	0	0
2009	PIT	16	2	27	24	3	0.0	1	-1	0	-1	0	0	0	0
2010	IND	8	0	10	9	1	0.0	0	0	0	0	0	0	0	0
		191	80	470	392	78	15.5	21	190	3	39	5	4	2	0

=== Playoffs ===
Year	Team	Games		Tackles				Interceptions				Fumbles			
Year	Team	GP	GS	Comb	Solo	Ast	Sck	Int	Yds	TD	Lng	FF	FR	Yds	TD
2001	PIT	2	0	3	3	0	0.0	0	0	0	0	0	0	0	0
2002	PIT	2	1	10	9	1	0.0	**1**	0	0	0	0	0	0	0
2004	PIT	2	2	4	2	2	0.0	0	0	0	0	0	0	0	0
2005	PIT	4	4	**17**	**14**	**3**	**1.0**	0	0	0	0	0	0	0	0
2007	PIT	1	0	3	3	0	0.0	0	0	0	0	0	0	0	0
2008	PIT	3	0	4	3	1	0.0	**1**	**2**	0	**2**	0	0	0	0
		14	7	41	34	7	1.0	2	2	0	2	0	0	0	0

== Coaching career ==
=== Arizona Cardinals ===
On February 10, 2011, Townsend was hired as assistant defensive backs coach of the Arizona Cardinals, joining former coach Ray Horton who was named defensive coordinator. He was released alongside head coach Ken Whisenhunt at the end of the 2012 season.

=== Mississippi State ===
In January 2013, Townsend was hired as cornerbacks coach at Mississippi State University. Under his coaching, defensive back Nickoe Whitley recorded 5 interceptions, 2nd-best in the SEC, Jamerson Love ranked 2nd in interception return touchdowns, and Taveze Calhoun ranked 2nd in interception return yards. Whitley would be named All-SEC.

=== Tennessee Titans ===
On January 26, 2016, Townsend was named the defensive backs coach of the Tennessee Titans, joining his former defensive coordinator when he was a player, Dick LeBeau from the Steelers during 2004–09. Under his coaching, safety Kevin Byard led the NFL in interceptions, make the 2018 Pro Bowl, and was named first-team All-Pro.

=== New York Giants ===
On February 6, 2018, Townsend was named the assistant defensive backs coach for the New York Giants. Under his coaching, cornerback Janoris Jenkins ranked 5th in passes defended and safety Landon Collins made the Pro Bowl.

=== Chicago Bears ===
On January 18, 2019, Townsend was named the defensive backs coach for the Chicago Bears, a position that was eventually renamed to secondary coach. Under his coaching, Kyle Fuller made the Pro Bowl.

=== Jacksonville Jaguars ===
On February 17, 2022, Townsend was hired by the Jacksonville Jaguars as their passing game coordinator and cornerbacks coach under head coach Doug Pederson. He was let go of his duties and fired on January 8, 2024.

=== Detroit Lions ===
On February 21, 2024, Townsend was hired by the Detroit Lions as their passing game coordinator and Defensive backs coach under head coach Dan Campbell.
