= 1995 Kentucky Wildcats football team =

American college football season

1995 Kentucky Wildcats football
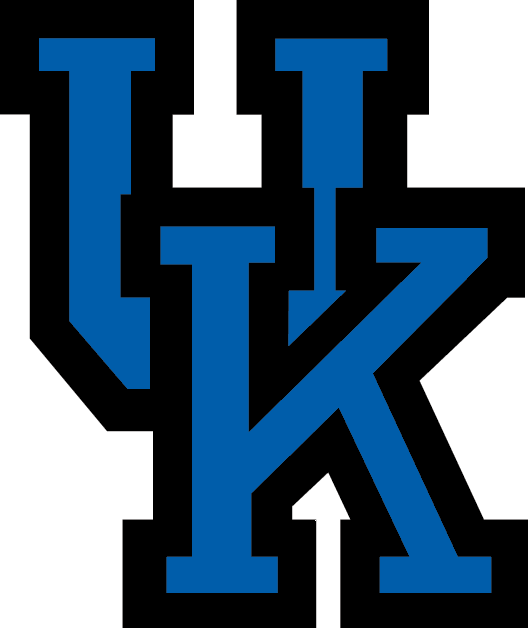
- Conference: Southeastern Conference
- Eastern Division
- Record: 4–7 (2–6 SEC)
- Head coach: Bill Curry (6th season)
- Offensive coordinator: Elliot Uzelac (1st season)
- Offensive scheme: Multiple
- Defensive coordinator: Mike Archer (3rd season)
- Base defense: 4–3
- Captains: Barry Jones; Mike Schlegel; David Snardon; James Tucker
- Home stadium: Commonwealth Stadium

1995 Southeastern Conference football standings
	Conf.					Overall
Team	W		L		T	W		L		T
Eastern Division
No. 2 Florida x$	8	–	0	–	0	12	–	1	–	0
No. 3 Tennessee	7	–	1	–	0	11	–	1	–	0
Georgia	3	–	5	–	0	6	–	6	–	0
South Carolina	2	–	5	–	1	4	–	6	–	1
Kentucky	2	–	6	–	0	4	–	7	–	0
Vanderbilt	1	–	7	–	0	2	–	9	–	0
Western Division
Arkansas x	6	–	2	–	0	8	–	5	–	0
No. 21 Alabama	5	–	3	–	0	8	–	3	–	0
No. 22 Auburn	5	–	3	–	0	8	–	4	–	0
LSU	4	–	3	–	1	7	–	4	–	1
Ole Miss	3	–	5	–	0	6	–	5	–	0
Mississippi State	1	–	7	–	0	3	–	8	–	0
Championship: Florida 34, Arkansas 3
$ – Conference champion; x – Division champion/co-champions; Rankings from AP Poll

The 1995 Kentucky Wildcats football team represented the University of Kentucky in the Southeastern Conference (SEC) during the 1995 NCAA Division I-A football season. In their sixth season under head coach Bill Curry, the Wildcats compiled a 4–7 record (2–6 against SEC opponents), finished in fifth place in the Eastern Division of the SEC, and were outscored by their opponents, 269 to 223. The team played its home games in Commonwealth Stadium in Lexington, Kentucky.

The team's statistical leaders included Billy Jack Haskins with 1,176 passing yards, Moe Williams with 1,600 rushing yards, and Craig Yeast with 337 receiving yards.

== Schedule ==
Date	Time	Opponent	Site	TV	Result	Attendance	Source
September 2	7:00 p.m.	Louisville*	Commonwealth Stadium; Lexington, KY (Governor's Cup)		L 10–13	58,967	
September 9	7:00 p.m.	No. 5 Florida	Commonwealth Stadium; Lexington, KY (rivalry)		L 7–42	53,524	
September 16	2:00 p.m.	at Indiana*	Memorial Stadium; Bloomington, IN (rivalry)		W 17–10	37,225	
September 23	12:30 p.m.	at South Carolina	Williams–Brice Stadium; Columbia, SC	JPS	W 35–30	65,325	
September 30	7:00 p.m.	No. 13 Auburn	Commonwealth Stadium; Lexington, KY	PPV	L 21–42	58,250	
October 14	7:00 p.m.	LSU	Commonwealth Stadium; Lexington, KY	PPV	W 24–16	51,500	
October 21	12:30 p.m.	at Georgia	Sanford Stadium; Athens, GA	JPS	L 3–12	85,412	
October 28	2:30 p.m.	at Mississippi State	Scott Field; Starkville, MS		L 32–42	30,122	
November 4	2:00 p.m.	at Vanderbilt	Vanderbilt Stadium; Nashville, TN (rivalry)		L 10–14	26,053	
November 11	1:00 p.m.	Cincinnati*	Commonwealth Stadium; Lexington, KY		W 33–14	25,231	
November 18	12:30 p.m.	No. 4 Tennessee	Commonwealth Stadium; Lexington, KY (rivalry)	JPS	L 31–34	52,300	
*Non-conference game; Rankings from AP Poll released prior to the game; All times are in Eastern time

== Roster ==
1995 Kentucky Wildcats football team roster
Players
Coaches
Offense

Pos.	#	Name	Class
[[American football positions|]]
[[American football positions|]]

Defense

Pos.	#	Name	Class
[[American football positions|]]

Special teams

Pos.	#	Name	Class

}}

Head coach

- [[]]

Coordinators/assistant coaches

Legend

- (C) Team captain
- (S) Suspended
- (I) Ineligible
- Injured
- Redshirt
