= Chris Doering =

American football player (born 1973)

No. 15, 85, 84, 83
- Position: Wide receiver

Personal information
- Born: May 19, 1973 (age 53); Gainesville, Florida, U.S.
- Listed height: 6 ft 4 in (1.93 m)
- Listed weight: 202 lb (92 kg)

Career information
- High school: P.K. Yonge (Gainesville)
- College: Florida
- NFL draft: 1996: 6th round, 185th overall pick

Career history
- Jacksonville Jaguars (1996)*; New York Jets (1996)*; Indianapolis Colts (1996–1997); Cincinnati Bengals (1998)*; Denver Broncos (1999–2000); Carolina Cobras (2001)*; Washington Redskins (2002); Pittsburgh Steelers (2003–2004); Houston Texans (2006)*; Los Angeles Avengers (2004–2008)*
- * Offseason or practice squad member only

Awards and highlights
- Second-team All-American (1995); First-team All-SEC (1995); Florida–Georgia Hall of Fame; University of Florida Athletic Hall of Fame

Career NFL statistics
- Receptions: 42
- Receiving yards: 476
- Receiving touchdowns: 3
- Stats at Pro Football Reference

Christopher Paul Doering (born May 19, 1973) is an American former professional football player who was a wide receiver for seven seasons in the National Football League (NFL) during the 1990s and 2000s. Doering played college football for the Florida Gators, earning second-team All-American honors in 1995. He played professionally for the Indianapolis Colts, the Denver Broncos, the Washington Redskins, and the Pittsburgh Steelers of the NFL.

== Early life ==
Doering was born in Gainesville, Florida in 1973. He attended P.K. Yonge High School in Gainesville, where he was a standout prep athlete for the P.K. Yonge Blue Wave in three sports.

== College career ==
Doering attended the University of Florida in Gainesville, where he was a walk-on player for coach Steve Spurrier's Florida Gators football team in 1991. The Gators coaching staff decided to redshirt him in 1991, and subsequently Doering received an athletic scholarship and played for the Gators from 1992 to 1995. Doering not only earned a scholarship, the former walk-on set records: Doering caught 149 receptions (sixth best in Gators history) for 2,107 yards (tenth best in Gators history) and thirty-one touchdowns (best in Gators and 2nd best in SEC history as DeVonta Smith of Alabama broke this record November 21, 2020 vs Kentucky ) during his career at Florida. His best-remembered play as a Gator was the game-winning touchdown pass he caught from Gators quarterback Danny Wuerffel to defeat the Kentucky Wildcats, 24–20, in 1993. Sometimes called "The Catch," it is also remembered as "Doering's Got a Touchdown" after the repeated exclamation made by Gator radio host Mick Hubert during his broadcast of the game. During his four seasons as a Gator, the team won three straight Southeastern Conference (SEC) championships (1993, 1994, 1995); as senior team captain in 1995, he received first-team All-SEC and second-team All-American honors.

Doering graduated from Florida with a bachelor's degree in telecommunications in 1995, and he was inducted into the University of Florida Athletic Hall of Fame as a "Gator Great" in 2006. He was picked as the No. 19 greatest Gator from the first 100 years of Florida football in a 2006 article series published by The Gainesville Sun.

== Professional career ==
The Jacksonville Jaguars selected Doering in the sixth round (185th pick overall) of the 1996 NFL draft. The Jaguars traded him to the Indianapolis Colts before the start of the 1996 season. He played for the Colts in three games in two seasons (1996–1997), but saw little action. The Colts waived him February 1998. The Cincinnati Bengals signed Doering a week later, but waived him before the 1998 regular season began.

In 1999, Doering signed with the Denver Broncos and appeared in three games. During the 2000 preseason, he ruptured his Achilles tendon and was sidelined for the rest of the season, but returned to the Broncos' practice squad in 2001. The Washington Redskins, led by Doering's former Gators coach Steve Spurrier, signed him as a free agent in 2002, and he appeared in fifteen games and started three for the Redskins, compiling eighteen receptions for 192 yards and two touchdowns. In 2003, the Pittsburgh Steelers signed him, and he saw action in nineteen games through 2004, with eighteen catches for 240 yards and a touchdown.

Doering finished his journeyman NFL career with 42 receptions for 476 yards and three touchdowns.

== Life after football ==
Doering was co-host (with Adam "The Oilcan" Reardon) a sports radio talk show called "The Sports Fix" and broadcast on ESPN Radio AM 900 and AM 1230 in Gainesville and Ocala, Florida and he was an occasional sideline reporter for Westwood One football coverage. In August 2015 Doering joined ESPN as a studio analyst after previously contributing to SEC Network events and ESPN specials. He signed a multi-year contract extension to continue as a contributor across ESPN and SEC Network programming, including SEC Network's signature news and information show, SEC Now. Doering operates and is president of a home loan mortgage brokerage in Gainesville. He has two children. Doering, along with former Gator teammate Judd Davis, plays jai alai matches at Ocala Poker and Jai Alai, without an audience or wagering, in order to satisfy Florida licensing requirements for the facility's card room.

== See also ==
- Florida Gators football, 1990–99
- List of Florida Gators football All-Americans
- List of Florida Gators in the NFL draft
- List of NCAA major college football yearly receiving leaders
- List of Pittsburgh Steelers players
- List of University of Florida alumni
- List of University of Florida Athletic Hall of Fame members
- List of Washington Redskins players
