= 1995 Ole Miss Rebels football team =

American college football season

1995 Ole Miss Rebels football
- Conference: Southeastern Conference
- Western Division
- Record: 6–5 (3–5 SEC)
- Head coach: Tommy Tuberville (1st season)
- Offensive coordinator: Noel Mazzone (1st season)
- Offensive scheme: Pro-style
- Defensive coordinator: Art Kaufman (1st season)
- Base defense: 4–3
- Home stadium: Vaught–Hemingway Stadium; Liberty Bowl Memorial Stadium

1995 Southeastern Conference football standings
	Conf.					Overall
Team	W		L		T	W		L		T
Eastern Division
No. 2 Florida x$	8	–	0	–	0	12	–	1	–	0
No. 3 Tennessee	7	–	1	–	0	11	–	1	–	0
Georgia	3	–	5	–	0	6	–	6	–	0
South Carolina	2	–	5	–	1	4	–	6	–	1
Kentucky	2	–	6	–	0	4	–	7	–	0
Vanderbilt	1	–	7	–	0	2	–	9	–	0
Western Division
Arkansas x	6	–	2	–	0	8	–	5	–	0
No. 21 Alabama	5	–	3	–	0	8	–	3	–	0
No. 22 Auburn	5	–	3	–	0	8	–	4	–	0
LSU	4	–	3	–	1	7	–	4	–	1
Ole Miss	3	–	5	–	0	6	–	5	–	0
Mississippi State	1	–	7	–	0	3	–	8	–	0
Championship: Florida 34, Arkansas 3
$ – Conference champion; x – Division champion/co-champions; Rankings from AP Poll

The 1995 Ole Miss Rebels football team represented the University of Mississippi as a member of the Western Division of the Southeastern Conference (SEC) during the 1995 NCAA Division I-A football season. Led by first-year head coach Tommy Tuberville, the Rebels compiled an overall record of 6–5 with a mark of 3–5 in conference play, placing fifth in the SEC's Western Division. Ole Miss played home games at Vaught–Hemingway Stadium in Oxford, Mississippi and at the Liberty Bowl Memorial Stadium in Memphis, Tennessee.

The Rebels were banned from appearing on television and the postseason due to severe sanctions handed down by the NCAA in November 1994 for violations committed by Billy Brewer, an ex-Rebel player who coached at his alma mater from 1983-93. As of 2025, the 1995 Rebels are the last team to be prohibited from appearing on live television by the NCAA.

Due to the lost revenue from the television ban, plus other budget difficulties, the Rebels were forced to take a five-hour bus ride to Baton Rouge for their game vs. LSU.

== Schedule ==
Date	Opponent	Site	Result	Attendance	Source
September 2	at No. 6 Auburn	Jordan-Hare Stadium; Auburn, AL (rivalry)	L 13–46	87,371	
September 9	Indiana State*	Vaught–Hemingway Stadium; Oxford, MS	W 56–10	22,642	
September 23	No. 20 Georgia	Vaught–Hemingway Stadium; Oxford, MS	W 18–10	39,437	
September 30	at No. 3 Florida	Ben Hill Griffin Stadium; Gainesville, FL	L 10–28	85,174	
October 7	Tulane*	Vaught–Hemingway Stadium; Oxford, MS (rivalry)	W 20–17	25,683	
October 14	vs. Arkansas	Liberty Bowl Memorial Stadium; Memphis, TN (rivalry)	L 6–13	29,104	
October 21	No. 21 Alabama	Vaught–Hemingway Stadium; Oxford, MS (rivalry)	L 9–23	44,312	
October 28	Vanderbilt	Vaught–Hemingway Stadium; Oxford, MS (rivalry)	W 21–10	30,317	
November 4	at Memphis*	Liberty Bowl Memorial Stadium; Memphis, TN (rivalry)	W 34–3	28,130	
November 11	at LSU	Tiger Stadium; Baton Rouge, LA (rivalry)	L 9–38	78,246	
November 25	at Mississippi State	Scott Field; Starkville, MS (Egg Bowl)	W 13–10	38,107	
*Non-conference game; Rankings from AP Poll released prior to the game

== Roster ==
1995 Ole Miss Rebels football team roster
Players			Coaches
Offense: Pos. / # / Name / Class; / / LeMay Thomas	Defense: Pos. / # / Name / Class	Special teams: Pos. / # / Name / Class	Head coach: Tommy Tuberville; Coordinators/assistant coaches Legend: (C) Team captain; (S) Suspended; (I) Ineligible; Injured; Redshirt
