= 1995 Auburn Tigers football team =

American college football season

1995 Auburn Tigers football

Outback Bowl, L 14–43 vs. Penn State
- Conference: Southeastern Conference
- Western Division

Ranking
- Coaches: No. 21
- AP: No. 22
- Record: 8–4 (5–3 SEC)
- Head coach: Terry Bowden (3rd season)
- Offensive coordinator: Tommy Bowden (5th season)
- Defensive coordinator: Wayne Hall (10th season)
- Home stadium: Jordan–Hare Stadium

1995 Southeastern Conference football standings
	Conf.					Overall
Team	W		L		T	W		L		T
Eastern Division
No. 2 Florida x$	8	–	0	–	0	12	–	1	–	0
No. 3 Tennessee	7	–	1	–	0	11	–	1	–	0
Georgia	3	–	5	–	0	6	–	6	–	0
South Carolina	2	–	5	–	1	4	–	6	–	1
Kentucky	2	–	6	–	0	4	–	7	–	0
Vanderbilt	1	–	7	–	0	2	–	9	–	0
Western Division
Arkansas x	6	–	2	–	0	8	–	5	–	0
No. 21 Alabama	5	–	3	–	0	8	–	3	–	0
No. 22 Auburn	5	–	3	–	0	8	–	4	–	0
LSU	4	–	3	–	1	7	–	4	–	1
Ole Miss	3	–	5	–	0	6	–	5	–	0
Mississippi State	1	–	7	–	0	3	–	8	–	0
Championship: Florida 34, Arkansas 3
$ – Conference champion; x – Division champion/co-champions; Rankings from AP Poll

The 1995 Auburn Tigers football team represented Auburn University in the 1995 NCAA Division I-A football season. Coached by Terry Bowden, they finished with an 8–4 record and a 5–3 mark in the Southeastern Conference (SEC). Auburn played in the 1996 Outback Bowl at the end of the season, marking their first bowl game since 1990. The Tigers had been banned from postseason play the previous two seasons.

== Schedule ==
Date	Time	Opponent	Rank	Site	TV	Result	Attendance	Source
September 2	6:00 p.m.	Ole Miss	No. 6	Jordan-Hare Stadium; Auburn, AL (rivalry)		W 46–13	87,371	
September 9	6:00 p.m.	Chattanooga*	No. 6	Jordan-Hare Stadium; Auburn, AL	PPV	W 76–10	81,570	
September 16	7:00 p.m.	at LSU	No. 5	Tiger Stadium; Baton Rouge, LA (rivalry)	PPV	L 6–12	80,559	
September 30	6:00 p.m.	at Kentucky	No. 13	Commonwealth Stadium; Lexington, KY	PPV	W 42–21	58,250	
October 7	1:00 p.m.	Mississippi State	No. 11	Jordan-Hare Stadium; Auburn, AL		W 48–20	77,641	
October 14	11:00 a.m.	No. 3 Florida	No. 7	Jordan-Hare Stadium; Auburn, AL (rivalry)	ABC	L 38–49	85,214	
October 21	1:00 p.m.	Western Michigan*^{†}	No. 13	Jordan-Hare Stadium; Auburn, AL		W 34–13	76,107	
October 28	6:30 p.m.	at Arkansas	No. 11	War Memorial Stadium; Little Rock, AR	ESPN	L 28–30	55,630	
November 4	1:00 p.m.	Northeast Louisiana*^{†}	No. 21	Jordan-Hare Stadium; Auburn, AL		W 38–14	78,149	
November 11	4:00 p.m.	at Georgia	No. 20	Sanford Stadium; Athens, GA (Deep South's Oldest Rivalry)	ESPN	W 37–31	86,117	
November 18	4:30 p.m.	No. 17 Alabama	No. 21	Jordan-Hare Stadium; Auburn, AL (Iron Bowl, College GameDay)	ESPN	W 31–27	85,214	
January 1	10:00 a.m.	vs. No. 15 Penn State*	No. 16	Tampa Stadium; Tampa, FL (Outback Bowl)	ESPN	L 14–43	65,313	
*Non-conference game; ^{†}Homecoming; Rankings from AP Poll released prior to the game; All times are in Central time
