= 1996 Fiesta Bowl =

1996 Tostitos Fiesta Bowl
- Bowl Alliance National Championship Game; 25th Fiesta Bowl
| Florida Gators | Nebraska Cornhuskers |
| (12–0) | (11–0) |
| SEC | Big Eight |
| 24 | 62 |
| Head coach: Steve Spurrier | Head coach: Tom Osborne |
| AP / Coaches / BA; 2 / 2 / 2 | AP / Coaches / BA; 1 / 1 / 1 |
| | 1 | 2 | 3 | 4 | Total |
|---|---|---|---|---|---|
| Florida | 10 | 0 | 8 | 6 | 24 |
| Nebraska | 6 | 29 | 14 | 13 | 62 |
- Date: January 2, 1996
- Season: 1995
- Stadium: Sun Devil Stadium
- Location: Tempe, Arizona
- MVP: Tommie Frazier
- Favorite: Nebraska by 3 1/2
- National anthem: Patti Austin
- Referee: Pat Flood (Pac-10)
- Attendance: 79,864

United States TV coverage
- Network: CBS
- Announcers: Jim Nantz and Terry Donahue

The 1996 Tostitos Fiesta Bowl game was a post-season college football bowl game that was played on January 2, 1996, at Sun Devil Stadium in Tempe, Arizona as part of 1995 college football season. The game was the first national championship game held under the auspices of the Bowl Alliance, which had been formed prior to the season.

The bowl featured No. 1 ranked, defending national champion, and Big Eight Conference champion Nebraska against No. 2 ranked Florida, the champion of the Southeastern Conference. Nebraska won the game by 38 points, with a final score of 62–24, to repeat as national champions for the second time in school history after doing so in 1970 and 1971. Nebraska's 38 point victory was, at the time, the largest defeat in National Championship game history and a record that stood until the 2023 College Football Playoff National Championship, when Georgia defeated TCU by 58 points.

== Teams ==
The game was billed as a classic No. 1 vs. No. 2 matchup, featuring two completely different but equally potent offenses. Oddsmakers had made Nebraska about a 3-point favorite going into the game. However, many experts picked Florida to win, as it was thought that Nebraska's option attack would not succeed very well on Sun Devil Stadium's grass field, and that the passing arm of Florida quarterback Danny Wuerffel would be too deadly for Nebraska to stop.

=== Nebraska Cornhuskers ===
Nebraska, the defending national champion, opened the season by pounding Oklahoma State, 64–21. It set the tone for a season in which no opponent came within 14 points, including three top-10 ranked opponents whom the Huskers defeated by a combined score of 134–49 (No. 8 Kansas State, No. 7 Colorado, and No. 10 Kansas). The Huskers averaged more than 53 points per game and 400 yards rushing.

=== Florida Gators ===
Florida, behind the passing of future Heisman Trophy winner Danny Wuerffel, had racked up similarly impressive offensive numbers, though mostly through the air. They emerged unbeaten through a brutal SEC schedule, having throttled rivals Tennessee and Florida State, and whipping Arkansas 34–3 in the 1995 SEC Championship Game. Florida, like Nebraska, had rarely been tested; its closest margin of victory had been 11 points.

== Game summary ==
=== First quarter ===
Florida received the opening kickoff and drove to the Nebraska 5, before settling for a 23-yard Bart Edmiston field goal. Aided by good field position, the Huskers countered on their opening series with a 53-yard scoring drive, capped by a 16-yard cross-field throwback pass from Tommie Frazier to Lawrence Phillips. The Gators blocked the Huskers' extra point, and Nebraska led 6–3. Late in the period, Florida went back ahead on a short 1-yard sneak from Wuerffel and led 10–6. As the Gators scored, CBS' Terry Donahue stated, "Nebraska better not get too far behind."

=== Second quarter ===
The Huskers effectively put the game out of reach with a 29-point explosion in the second quarter. Phillips began the quarter with a dazzling 42-yard touchdown run that put the Huskers back in front. On the very next possession, Florida took over at its own 22, but was pushed back into the shadow of its own end zone. On second down, the Huskers appeared to have sacked Wuerffel in the end zone for a safety, but officials ruled his forward progress had brought him out to the 1. On the very next play from scrimmage, Jamel Williams blitzed and sacked Wuerffel untouched in the middle of the end zone, forcing the resulting safety that had been denied from the play before, and the score was 15–10. A 1-yard dive from freshman Ahman Green and a Kris Brown field goal made the margin 15 points. Then, cornerback Michael Booker picked off a Wuerffel pass and returned it 42 yards for another Nebraska score, this one making it 32–10. Nebraska quickly forced a punt and added a second Brown field goal to take a decisive 35–10 advantage into the locker room.

=== Third quarter ===
Florida continued to struggle against Nebraska's aggressive, blitzing defense. On their second possession of the second half, Wuerffel was intercepted by Eric Stokes at the Nebraska 28. The Huskers' first two possessions both ventured deep into Florida territory before turning it over on an interception and on downs. Frazier then broke through the line for a blazing 35-yard touchdown run later in the third, putting the Huskers further in front at 42–10. Florida countered with a 77-yard scoring drive, capped by a 35-yard pass from Wuerffel to Ike Hilliard, and a two-point conversion made the score 42–18. The Huskers took over possession at their own 20 with less than a minute remaining in the third quarter. What followed was one of the most memorable plays in Nebraska football and Fiesta Bowl history.

The Run

On second down from the Nebraska 25, Cornhuskers quarterback Tommie Frazier ran an option play to the right, and decided to keep the ball rather than pitch. He gained 11 yards before being met by a group of Florida defenders at the 36-yard line, which he then dragged approximately 10 yards before shrugging them off and breaking free, streaking 75 yards down the sideline to give Nebraska a 49–18 lead. Frazier had broken no less than seven tackles on the play. Frazier would finish the game with 199 yards rushing. Nebraska also set records for most rushing yards in a bowl game, with 524, and the most points in the second quarter of a bowl game, with 29.

=== Fourth quarter ===
The fourth quarter was something of an anti-climax, with the result having more or less been decided. After the Huskers were forced to punt for the first time in the game, Florida muffed the catch and Nebraska recovered. Frazier orchestrated another touchdown drive on the short field, ending with a 15-yard Lawrence Phillips touchdown run. The ensuing PAT was blocked to leave the score at 55–18. Nebraska backup quarterback Brook Berringer came in to relieve Frazier and led the Huskers on one last scoring drive, which he capped himself with a 1-yard quarterback sneak, and the Huskers led 62–18. Reidel Anthony of Florida returned the ensuing kickoff 92 yards to end the scoring.

Florida attempted a two-point conversion, but quarterback Eric Kresser was sacked and fumbled. Nebraska defensive tackle Christian Peter recovered and returned it for two points but the play had been blown dead.

Third-string quarterback Matt Turman drove the Huskers to the Florida goal line before taking a knee to run out the clock. Nebraska won 62–24 and claimed a second consecutive national championship. They were the first team to win back-to-back titles since Alabama in 1978 and 1979. As of 2023, the 1994 and 1995 Nebraska teams remain the only undefeated and untied consensus - back-to-back national champions since Oklahoma in 1955 and 1956.

== Scoring summary ==
| Qtr | Time | Team | Detail | UF | NU |
|---|---|---|---|---|---|
| 1 | 11:07 | UF | Bart Edmiston 23-yd field goal | 3 | 0 |
| 1 | 8:10 | NU | Lawrence Phillips 16-yd pass from Tommie Frazier (Kris Brown kick blocked) | 3 | 6 |
| 1 | 1:17 | UF | Danny Wuerffel 1-yd run (Bart Edmiston kick) | 10 | 6 |
| 2 | 14:28 | NU | Lawrence Phillips 42-yd run (Kris Brown kick) | 10 | 13 |
| 2 | 12:42 | NU | Team Safety | 10 | 15 |
| 2 | 9:13 | NU | Ahman Green 1-yd run (Kris Brown kick) | 10 | 22 |
| 2 | 3:46 | NU | Kris Brown 26-yd field goal | 10 | 25 |
| 2 | 2:40 | NU | Michael Booker 42-yd interception return (Kris Brown kick) | 10 | 32 |
| 2 | 0:08 | NU | Kris Brown 24-yd field goal | 10 | 35 |
| 3 | 2:21 | NU | Tommie Frazier 35-yd run (Kris Brown kick) | 10 | 42 |
| 3 | 0:58 | UF | Ike Hilliard 35-yd pass from Danny Wuerffel (Reidel Anthony pass from Danny Wuerffel) | 18 | 42 |
| 3 | 0:01 | NU | Tommie Frazier 75-yd run (Kris Brown kick) | 18 | 49 |
| 4 | 8:25 | NU | Lawrence Phillips 15-yd run (Kris Brown kick no good) | 18 | 55 |
| 4 | 4:44 | NU | Brook Berringer 1-yd run (Ted Retzlaff kick) | 18 | 62 |
| 4 | 4:31 | UF | Reidel Anthony 93-yd kickoff return (Eric Kresser pass failed) | 24 | 62 |

== Aftermath ==
The 1995 Nebraska squad has been voted as the greatest college football team of all time in many surveys, including the all-time Sagarin ratings. An ESPN poll had them at number three, only behind the 1971 Nebraska and 1972 USC teams.

For much of the summer of 1996, a common joke on ESPN was "Hey Gators, Nebraska just scored again." The Gators would use the Fiesta Bowl rout as a rallying point for their 1996 season, in which they won the first national championship in school history.
