= 1995 Florida Gators football team =

American college football season

1995 Florida Gators football

SEC champion SEC Eastern Division champion

SEC Championship Game, W 34–3 vs. Arkansas

Fiesta Bowl (BA NCG), L 24–62 vs. Nebraska
- Conference: Southeastern Conference
- Eastern Division

Ranking
- Coaches: No. 3
- AP: No. 2
- Record: 12–1 (8–0 SEC)
- Head coach: Steve Spurrier (6th season)
- Offensive coordinator: Carl Franks (1st season)
- Offensive scheme: Fun and gun
- Defensive coordinator: Bob Pruett (2nd season)
- Base defense: 3–4
- Captains: Mark Campbell; Chris Doering; Reggie Green; Ben Hanks; Jason Odom
- Home stadium: Ben Hill Griffin Stadium

1995 Southeastern Conference football standings
| | Conf. | | | | | Overall |
| Team | W | | L | | T | W | | L | | T |
|---|---|---|---|---|---|---|---|---|---|---|
Eastern Division
| No. 2 Florida x$ | 8 | – | 0 | – | 0 | 12 | – | 1 | – | 0 |
| No. 3 Tennessee | 7 | – | 1 | – | 0 | 11 | – | 1 | – | 0 |
| Georgia | 3 | – | 5 | – | 0 | 6 | – | 6 | – | 0 |
| South Carolina | 2 | – | 5 | – | 1 | 4 | – | 6 | – | 1 |
| Kentucky | 2 | – | 6 | – | 0 | 4 | – | 7 | – | 0 |
| Vanderbilt | 1 | – | 7 | – | 0 | 2 | – | 9 | – | 0 |
Western Division
| Arkansas x | 6 | – | 2 | – | 0 | 8 | – | 5 | – | 0 |
| No. 21 Alabama | 5 | – | 3 | – | 0 | 8 | – | 3 | – | 0 |
| No. 22 Auburn | 5 | – | 3 | – | 0 | 8 | – | 4 | – | 0 |
| LSU | 4 | – | 3 | – | 1 | 7 | – | 4 | – | 1 |
| Ole Miss | 3 | – | 5 | – | 0 | 6 | – | 5 | – | 0 |
| Mississippi State | 1 | – | 7 | – | 0 | 3 | – | 8 | – | 0 |
Championship: Florida 34, Arkansas 3
$ – Conference champion; x – Division champion/co-champions; Rankings from AP Poll

The 1995 Florida Gators football team represented the University of Florida in the sport of American football during the 1995 NCAA Division I-A football season. The 1995 season was the Florida Gators' sixth year under head coach Steve Spurrier and was one of the most successful in school history, as the Gators finished the regular season unbeaten and untied for the first time (the 1911 team went 5–0–1).

The Gators used coach Spurrier's pass-heavy "fun 'n gun" offense". Led by Heisman Trophy finalist quarterback Danny Wuerffel, the offense set many school and conference offensive records, including passing touchdowns, passing yards per game, total yards per game, and points per game, among others.

After finishing the regular season 12–0 (8–0 in the SEC), Florida defeated the Arkansas Razorbacks 34–3 in the 1995 SEC Championship Game. As the No. 2 ranked team, the Gators were invited to play in the 1996 Fiesta Bowl, which was the Bowl Alliance national championship game. In Tempe, Florida lost 62–24 to the No. 1 ranked Nebraska Cornhuskers but remained No. 2 in the final AP poll.

== Before the season ==
Prior to the season, the old Bermuda grass was replaced with newly grown sod.

== Schedule ==
| Date | Opponent | Rank | Site | TV | Result | Attendance | Source |
|---|---|---|---|---|---|---|---|
| September 2 | Houston* | No. 5 | Ben Hill Griffin Stadium; Gainesville, FL | | W 45–21 | 84,672 | |
| September 9 | at Kentucky | No. 5 | Commonwealth Stadium; Lexington, KY (rivalry) | | W 42–7 | 53,524 | |
| September 16 | No. 8 Tennessee | No. 4 | Ben Hill Griffin Stadium; Gainesville, FL (rivalry) | ABC | W 62–37 | 85,105 | |
| September 30 | Ole Miss | No. 3 | Ben Hill Griffin Stadium; Gainesville, FL | | W 28–10 | 85,174 | |
| October 7 | at No. 21 LSU | No. 3 | Tiger Stadium; Baton Rouge, LA (rivalry) | JPS | W 28–10 | 80,583 | |
| October 14 | at No. 7 Auburn | No. 3 | Jordan-Hare Stadium; Auburn, AL (rivalry) | ABC | W 49–38 | 85,214 | |
| October 28 | at Georgia | No. 3 | Sanford Stadium; Athens, GA (rivalry) | ABC | W 52–17 | 86,117 | |
| November 4 | Northern Illinois* | No. 3 | Ben Hill Griffin Stadium; Gainesville, FL | | W 58–20 | 84,922 | |
| November 11 | at South Carolina | No. 3 | Williams–Brice Stadium; Columbia, SC | ESPN | W 63–7 | 71,638 | |
| November 18 | Vanderbilt | No. 3 | Ben Hill Griffin Stadium; Gainesville, FL | JPS | W 38–7 | 85,248 | |
| November 25 | No. 6 Florida State* | No. 3 | Ben Hill Griffin Stadium; Gainesville, FL (rivalry / College GameDay) | ABC | W 35–24 | 85,711 | |
| December 2 | vs. No. 23 Arkansas | No. 2 | Georgia Dome; Atlanta, GA (SEC Championship) | ABC | W 34–3 | 71,325 | |
| January 2, 1996 | vs. No. 1 Nebraska* | No. 2 | Sun Devil Stadium; Tempe, AZ (Fiesta Bowl / College GameDay) | CBS | L 24–62 | 79,864 | |
*Non-conference game; Rankings from AP Poll released prior to the game

== Game summaries ==
=== Houston ===
Houston vs #5 Florida

| Team | 1 | 2 | 3 | 4 | Total |
|---|---|---|---|---|---|
| Houston | 14 | 0 | 7 | 0 | 21 |
| • Florida | 14 | 21 | 7 | 3 | 45 |

- Date: September 2
- Location: Ben Hill Griffin Stadium, Gainesville, Florida
- Game attendance: 84,672

Scoring summary
| 1 | ? | HOU | A. Smith 6 yard run (Villareal kick) | HOU 7-0 |
| 1 | ? | FLA | Elijah Williams 1 yard run (Bart Edmiston kick) | 7-7 |
| 1 | ? | HOU | L. James 77 yard pass from Clements (Villareal kick) | HOU 14-7 |
| 1 | ? | FLA | Sorola Palmer 22 yard pass from Danny Wuerffel (Bart Edmiston kick) | 14-14 |
| 2 | ? | FLA | Ike Hilliard 12 yard pass from Eric Kresser (Bart Edmiston kick) | FLA 21-14 |
| 2 | ? | FLA | Chris Doering 40 yard pass from Eric Kresser (Bart Edmiston kick) | FLA 28-14 |
| 2 | ? | FLA | Jackson 2 yard run (Bart Edmiston kick) | FLA 35-14 |
| 3 | ? | HOU | McGuire 12 yard run (Villareal kick) | FLA 35-21 |
| 3 | ? | FLA | Elijah Williams 4 yard run (Bart Edmiston kick) | FLA 42-21 |
| 4 | ? | FLA | Bart Edmiston 22 yard field goal | FLA 45-21 |

In the opener, Florida was off to a shaky start, but was able to defeat the 45-point underdog Houston Cougars 45–21. The defense was suspect, surrendering 421 total yards to a Cougar team which won a single game the year before.

"We managed to get away with a victory but Houston was probably better prepared than we were", said coach Spurrier.

=== Kentucky ===
#5 Florida at Kentucky

| Team | 1 | 2 | 3 | 4 | Total |
|---|---|---|---|---|---|
| • Florida | 14 | 14 | 14 | 0 | 42 |
| Kentucky | 0 | 0 | 0 | 7 | 7 |

- Date: September 9
- Location: Commonwealth Stadium, Lexington, Kentucky
- Game attendance: 53,524

Scoring summary
| 1 | ? | FLA | Chris Doering 9 yard pass from Danny Wuerffel (Bart Edmiston kick) | FLA 7-0 |
| 1 | ? | FLA | Fred Taylor 1 yard run (Bart Edmiston kick) | FLA 14-0 |
| 2 | ? | FLA | Jackson 4 yard run (Bart Edmiston kick) | FLA 21-0 |
| 2 | ? | FLA | Chris Doering 13 yard pass from Danny Wuerffel (Bart Edmiston kick) | FLA 28-0 |
| 3 | ? | FLA | Jackson 8 yard run (Bart Edmiston kick) | FLA 35-0 |
| 3 | ? | FLA | Jackson 6 yard run (Bart Edmiston kick) | FLA 42-0 |
| 4 | ? | UK | Yeast 30 yard pass from Haskins (Sivinski kick) | FLA 42-7 |

In the second week of play, the Gators easily beat the Kentucky Wildcats 42–7. Third-team tailback Terry Jackson picked up the load when Elijah Williams and Fred Taylor were injured, rushing for 138 yards and three touchdowns.

Wuerffel sat out after tossing a 13-yard touchdown to Chris Doering to go up 35–0.

=== Tennessee ===
#8 Tennessee at #4 Florida

| Team | 1 | 2 | 3 | 4 | Total |
|---|---|---|---|---|---|
| Tennessee | 23 | 7 | 0 | 7 | 37 |
| • Florida | 7 | 14 | 20 | 21 | 62 |

- Date: September 16
- Location: Ben Hill Griffin Stadium, Gainesville, Florida
- Game attendance: 85,105
- TV announcers (ABC): Keith Jackson, Bob Griese

Scoring summary
| 1 | ? | TENN | Marcus Nash 9 yard pass from Peyton Manning | TENN 7-0 |
| 1 | ? | FLA | Ike Hilliard 14 yard pass from Danny Wuerffel | 7-7 |
| 1 | ? | TENN | Chester Ford 1 yard run | TENN 13-7 |
| 2 | ? | TENN | ? 31 yard field goal | TENN 16-7 |
| 2 | ? | TENN | Marcus Nash 20 yard pass from Peyton Manning | TENN 23-7 |
| 2 | ? | FLA | Fred Taylor 1 yard run | TENN 23-14 |
| 2 | ? | TENN | Ramon Austin 48 yard fumble return | TENN 30-14 |
| 2 | ? | FLA | Ike Hilliard 11 yard pass from Danny Wuerffel | TENN 30-21 |
| 3 | ? | FLA | Ike Hilliard 6 yard pass from Danny Wuerffel | TENN 30-28 |
| 3 | ? | FLA | Ike Hilliard 15 yard pass from Danny Wuerffel | FLA 34-30 |
| 3 | ? | FLA | Reidel Anthony 9 yard pass from Danny Wuerffel | FLA 41-30 |
| 4 | ? | FLA | Reidel Anthony 20 yard run | FLA 48-30 |
| 4 | ? | FLA | Danny Wuerffel 1 yard run | FLA 55-30 |
| 4 | ? | FLA | Chris Doering 20 yard pass from Danny Wuerffel | FLA 62-30 |
| 4 | ? | TENN | ? | FLA 62-37 |

In the first major test of the season, the Gators routed the rival and eighth-ranked Tennessee Volunteers 62–37. On the first play from scrimmage, Volunteer quarterback Peyton Manning connected with receiver Joey Kent for a 72-yard gain. On the next play, Manning threw a touchdown pass to Marcus Nash, giving the Vols a 7–0 lead only 15 seconds into the game. After another Manning touchdown pass and two Gator turnovers, the Vols held a 30–14 advantage late in the second quarter in front of a stunned Florida Field crowd.

Wuerffel led the Gators to an answering score, cutting the lead to 30–21 with a touchdown pass in the last minute of the first half. That would be the beginning of a historic run, as Florida scored 48 straight points despite a torrential second half downpour and won 62–37. Many records were broken in the game: Wuerffel threw an SEC record six touchdown passes; Tennessee set school records for most points scored in a loss and most points given up in the modern era. After the game, Sports Illustrated chose to put Wuerffel on its cover instead of Manning. (Note: Florida and Tennessee closed the season ranked #2 and #3 in the AP Poll & #3 and #2 in the Coaches Poll, respectively.)

=== Ole Miss ===
Ole Miss at #3 Florida

| Team | 1 | 2 | 3 | 4 | Total |
|---|---|---|---|---|---|
| Ole Miss | 3 | 0 | 7 | 0 | 10 |
| • Florida | 14 | 7 | 7 | 0 | 28 |

- Date: September 30
- Location: Ben Hill Griffin Stadium, Gainesville, Florida
- Game attendance: 85,174

Scoring summary
| 1 | ? | FLA | Jacquez Green 42 yard run (Bart Edmiston kick) | FLA 7-0 |
| 1 | ? | FLA | Ike Hilliard 13 yard pass from Danny Wuerffel (Bart Edmiston kick) | FLA 14-0 |
| 2 | ? | MISS | Montz 26 yard field goal | FLA 14-3 |
| 2 | ? | FLA | Chris Doering 8 yard pass from Danny Wuerffel (Bart Edmiston kick) | FLA 21-3 |
| 3 | ? | MISS | Thomas 25 yard pass from Nelson (Montz kick) | FLA 21-10 |
| 3 | ? | FLA | Jacquez Green 33 yard pass from Danny Wuerffel (Bart Edmiston kick) | FLA 28-10 |

The next week was a lackluster performance versus Ole Miss. Though a 28–10 win for the Gators, the game involved just 59 offensive plays.

Florida's first touchdown came with a 42-yard run on a reverse, by Jacquez Green on a 4th-and-2. On Florida's next possession, Green went up against two defenders and snatched a pass for a 40-yard gain, setting up a 13-yard touchdown pass from Wuerffel to Ike Hilliard. An 8-yard pass to Chris Doering was his 101st career catch and gave Florida a 21–3 cushion early in the second quarter.

=== LSU ===
#3 Florida at #21 LSU

| Team | 1 | 2 | 3 | 4 | Total |
|---|---|---|---|---|---|
| • Florida | 7 | 14 | 7 | 0 | 28 |
| LSU | 0 | 10 | 0 | 0 | 10 |

- Date: October 7
- Location: Tiger Stadium, Baton Rouge, Louisiana
- Game attendance: 80,583

Scoring summary
| 1 | 00:16 | FLA | Elijah Williams 5 yard run (Bart Edmiston kick) | FLA 7-0 |
| 2 | 14:31 | FLA | Fred Taylor 4 yard run (Bart Edmiston kick) | FLA 14-0 |
| 2 | 11:11 | FLA | Fred Taylor 3 yard run (Bart Edmiston kick) | FLA 21-0 |
| 2 | 1:10 | LSU | Anthony McFarland 3 yard pass from Jamie Howard (Lafleur kick) | FLA 21-7 |
| 2 | 00:12 | LSU | Lafleur 28 yard field goal | FLA 21-10 |
| 3 | 2:04 | FLA | Reidel Anthony 21 yard pass from Danny Wuerffel | FLA 28-10 |

In Baton Rouge, Florida beat the LSU Tigers 28–10. The Gators mixed in the option into its normal offense to counter LSU and its eight-man front. Wuerffel called it one of his worst games, and threw three interceptions in the first half.

On the Gators' third possession, a crucial first down was had by an option pitch to Elijah Williams. Later on that same drive, the Gators scored on a third-and-goal from inside the 5-yard line using the same play to go up 7–0. Fred Taylor had short runs for two more touchdowns. LSU's offense seemed to come awake shortly before the half, scoring its 10 points quickly. LSU's touchdown came on a touchdown pass to defensive tackle Anthony McFarland. Florida scored its final touchdown on a 21-yard pass from Wuerffel to Reidel Anthony.

=== Auburn ===
#3 Florida at #7 Auburn

| Team | 1 | 2 | 3 | 4 | Total |
|---|---|---|---|---|---|
| • Florida | 14 | 21 | 7 | 7 | 49 |
| Auburn | 13 | 7 | 6 | 12 | 38 |

- Date: October 14
- Location: Jordan–Hare Stadium, Auburn, Alabama
- Game attendance: 85,214

Scoring summary
| 1 | ? | AUB | Harris 20 yard fumble return (Matt Hawkins kick) | AUB 7-0 |
| 1 | ? | AUB | Matt Hawkins 47 yard field goal | AUB 10-0 |
| 1 | ? | FLA | Reidel Anthony 90 yard kickoff return (Bart Edmiston kick) | AUB 10-7 |
| 1 | ? | AUB | Matt Hawkins 27 yard field goal | AUB 13-7 |
| 1 | 1:56 | FLA | Fred Taylor 10 yard run (Bart Edmiston kick) | FLA 14-13 |
| 2 | ? | AUB | Poor 21 yard pass from Patrick Nix (Matt Hawkins kick) | AUB 20-14 |
| 2 | ? | FLA | Elijah Williams 1 yard run (Bart Edmiston kick) | FLA 21-20 |
| 2 | ? | FLA | Ike Hilliard 22 yard pass from Danny Wuerffel (Bart Edmiston kick) | FLA 28-20 |
| 2 | ? | FLA | Chris Doering 11 yard pass from Danny Wuerffel (Bart Edmiston kick) | FLA 35-20 |
| 3 | ? | FLA | Chris Doering 38 yard pass from Danny Wuerffel (Bart Edmiston kick) | FLA 42-20 |
| 3 | ? | AUB | Dameyune Craig 3 yard run | FLA 42-26 |
| 4 | ? | FLA | Chris Doering 5 yard pass from Danny Wuerffel (Bart Edmiston kick) | FLA 49-26 |
| 4 | ? | AUB | Fred Beasley 2 yard run | FLA 49-32 |
| 4 | ? | AUB | Stephen Davis 46 yard run | FLA 49-38 |

Florida won against the Auburn Tigers 49 to 38, the first time Spurrier defeated Auburn coach Terry Bowden. The Gators committed two turnovers early against Auburn, which led 10–0 three minutes into the game.

The game stayed close throughout the first half. After the early, 10–0 Auburn lead, Reidel Anthony returned the ensuing kickoff for a touchdown. Auburn added a field goal, and passes to Jacquez Green set up a Fred Taylor touchdown run to give Florida its first lead of the game, 14–13. Auburn then retook the lead, 20–14; and after a short touchdown run by Elijah Williams, it was 21–20. Florida led 35-20 at the half.

Wuerffel threw a touchdown pass to Ike Hilliard and two to Chris Doering such that early in the third quarter it was already 42–20. One more touchdown was had by Doering. Auburn scored thrice more since the half, each time failing on a two-point conversion. The Tigers' last score came on a long run by Stephen Davis.

=== Georgia ===
#3 Florida at Georgia

| Team | 1 | 2 | 3 | 4 | Total |
|---|---|---|---|---|---|
| • Florida | 21 | 7 | 10 | 14 | 52 |
| Georgia | 0 | 3 | 0 | 14 | 17 |

- Date: October 28
- Location: Sanford Stadium, Athens, Georgia
- Game attendance: 86,117

Scoring summary
| 1 | ? | FLA | Chris Doering 15 yard pass from Danny Wuerffel | FLA 7-0 |
| 1 | ? | FLA | Chris Doering 2 yard pass from Danny Wuerffel | FLA 14-0 |
| 1 | ? | FLA | Chris Doering 24 yard pass from Danny Wuerffel | FLA 21-0 |
| 2 | ? | FLA | Chris Doering 10 yard pass from Danny Wuerffel | FLA 28-0 |
| 2 | ? | UGA | ? 23 yard field goal | FLA 28-3 |
| 3 | ? | FLA | Reidel Anthony 39 yard pass from Danny Wuerffel | FLA 35-3 |
| 3 | ? | FLA | Bart Edmiston 47 yard field goal | FLA 38-3 |
| 4 | ? | UGA | ? 1 yard pass from ? | FLA 38-10 |
| 4 | ? | FLA | Ike Hilliard 7 yard pass from Eric Kresser | FLA 45-10 |
| 4 | ? | UGA | ? | FLA 45-17 |
| 4 | ? | FLA | Travis McGriff 8 yard pass from Eric Kresser | FLA 52-17 |

Florida beat the Bulldogs 52–17, becoming the first visitor in Sanford Stadium history to score more than 50 points.

Florida was ahead 21–0 less than 12 minutes into the contest. Gators starting quarterback Danny Wuerffel threw for 242 yards and five touchdowns before leaving the game in the third quarter. "Danny Wuerffel was near perfect in the game", Spurrier said. "He only had one bad throw." With the Gators leading 38–17 in the fourth quarter, Gators backup quarterback Eric Kresser threw for two more touchdowns, one with 1:21 remaining, to make the final score 52–17. After the game, Gators coach Steve Spurrier stated that he had wanted to be the first opponent to hang "half a hundred" on the Bulldogs in their own stadium because "we heard no one had ever done that before." (Note: The previous highest score by a Bulldogs opponent in Sanford Stadium was 46 points by the 1936 Tennessee Volunteers.) The Gators' fifty-two points remains the record for most scored against Georgia "between the hedges."

=== Northern Illinois ===
Northern Illinois vs. #3 Florida

| Team | 1 | 2 | 3 | 4 | Total |
|---|---|---|---|---|---|
| Northern Illinois | 6 | 0 | 6 | 8 | 20 |
| • Florida | 17 | 20 | 14 | 7 | 58 |

- Date: November 4
- Location: Ben Hill Griffin Stadium, Gainesville, Florida
- Game attendance: 84,922

Scoring summary
| 1 | ? | FLA | Elijah Williams 22 yard pass from Eric Kresser (Bart Edminston kick) | FLA 7-0 |
| 1 | ? | FLA | Chris Doering 4 yard pass from Eric Kresser (Bart Edmiston kick) | FLA 14-0 |
| 1 | ? | FLA | Bart Edmiston 32 yard field goal | FLA 17-0 |
| 1 | ? | NIU | Talley 55 yard run | FLA 17-6 |
| 2 | ? | FLA | Jacquez Green 96 yard pass from Eric Kresser (Bart Edmiston kick) | FLA 24-6 |
| 2 | ? | FLA | Dwayne Mobley 1 yard pass from Eric Kresser (Bart Edmiston kick) | FLA 31-6 |
| 2 | ? | FLA | Jerome Evans 1 yard run | FLA 37-6 |
| 3 | ? | NIU | Talley 20 yard run | FLA 37-12 |
| 3 | ? | FLA | Tremayne Allen 43 yard pass from Eric Kresser (Stevenson kick) | FLA 44-12 |
| 3 | ? | FLA | Shawn Nunn 3 yard pass from Eric Kresser (Bart Edmiston kick) | FLA 51-12 |
| 4 | ? | NIU | Strickland 12 yard pass from Barker (Mitchell run) | FLA 51-20 |
| 4 | ? | FLA | David Nabavi 6 yard pass from Brian Schottenheimer (Bart Edmiston kick) | FLA 58-20 |

At homecoming the following week, backup quarterback Eric Kresser played in place of Wuerffel for the Northern Illinois game, a 58–20 defeat of the Huskies. Kresser threw for a school record 458 yards, breaking the record Terry Dean set against Southwestern Louisiana in 1993. Kresser passed for six touchdowns to six different players, including a 96-yard pass to Jacquez Green on a crossing route.

Despite the performance, Spurrier felt Kresser threw better in pre-game warmups. The Gators improved to 8-0 for the first time since 1928.

=== South Carolina ===
#3 Florida at South Carolina

| Team | 1 | 2 | 3 | 4 | Total |
|---|---|---|---|---|---|
| • Florida | 14 | 28 | 7 | 14 | 63 |
| South Carolina | 0 | 7 | 0 | 0 | 7 |

- Date: November 11
- Location: Williams–Brice Stadium, Columbia, South Carolina
- Game attendance: 71,638

Scoring summary
| 1 | 10:56 | FLA | Williams 3 yard run (Edmiston kick) | FLA 7-0 |
| 2 | 2:34 | FLA | Hilliard 2 yard pass from Wuerffel (Edmiston kick) | FLA 14-0 |
| 2 | 13:07 | FLA | Hilliard 18 yard pass from Wuerffel (Edmiston kick) | FLA 21-0 |
| 2 | ? | FLA | Williams 27 yard pass from Wuerffel (Edmiston kick) | FLA 28-0 |
| 2 | ? | FLA | Hilliard 25 yard pass from Wuerffel (Edmiston kick) | FLA 35-0 |
| 2 | 00:51 | SCAR | Staley 2 yard run (? kick) | FLA 35-7 |
| 2 | 00:07 | FLA | Doering 17 yard pass from Wuerffel (Edmiston kick) | FLA 42-7 |
| 3 | ? | FLA | Williams 38 yard run (Edmiston kick) | FLA 49-7 |
| 4 | ? | FLA | Green 39 yard pass from Kresser (Edmiston kick) | FLA 56-7 |
| 4 | ? | FLA | Dubose 2 yard run (Edmiston kick) | FLA 63-7 |

In Columbia, Florida clinched the SEC East title with a crushing 63–7 win over the South Carolina Gamecocks. Wuerffel threw for 304 yards including five touchdowns in the first half.

After a blocked punt, Wuerffel hit Hilliard with an 18-yard touchdown to go up 21–0 early into the second quarter. Florida used its substitutes after a 38-yard touchdown run by Elijah Williams midway through the third quarter. Kresser hit Green on a 39-yard touchdown pass on the first play of the fourth quarter.

=== Vanderbilt ===
Vanderbilt vs. #3 Florida

| Team | 1 | 2 | 3 | 4 | Total |
|---|---|---|---|---|---|
| Vanderbilt | 0 | 0 | 0 | 7 | 7 |
| • Florida | 7 | 10 | 14 | 7 | 38 |

- Date: November 18
- Location: Ben Hill Griffin Stadium, Gainesville, Florida
- Game attendance: 85,248

Scoring summary
| 1 | ? | FLA | Terry Jackson 9 yard run (Bart Edmiston kick) | FLA 7-0 |
| 2 | ? | FLA | Chris Doering 19 yard pass from Danny Wuerffel (Bart Edmiston kick) | FLA 14-0 |
| 2 | ? | FLA | Bart Edmiston 25 yard field goal | FLA 17-0 |
| 3 | ? | FLA | Elijah Williams 70 yard run (Bart Edmiston kick) | FLA 24-0 |
| 3 | ? | FLA | Jacquez Green 76 yard pass from Danny Wuerffel (Bart Edmiston kick) | FLA 31-0 |
| 4 | ? | FLA | Chris Doering 17 yard pass from Eric Kresser (Bart Edmiston kick) | FLA 38-0 |
| 4 | ? | VAN | Ware 18 yard pass from Damian Allen (Yenner kick) | FLA 38-7 |

Returning home the next week, Florida triumphed over the Vanderbilt Commodores 38–7. Chris Doering was named SEC Offensive Player of the Week with a season-high 11 catches for 169 yards. Elijah Williams had 128 yards rushing, including a 70-yard touchdown run.

The Gators were plagued by sacks and poor play, but played aggressive defense. In the second half, Vanderbilt wide receiver Fred Baker and Florida nickelback Ben Hanks were both ejected for fighting. Hanks apologized afterwards, and was suspended for a half the next week.

=== Florida State ===
#6 Florida State at #3 Florida

| Team | 1 | 2 | 3 | 4 | Total |
|---|---|---|---|---|---|
| Florida State | 6 | 0 | 18 | 0 | 24 |
| • Florida | 7 | 21 | 7 | 0 | 35 |

- Date: November 25
- Location: Ben Hill Griffin Stadium, Gainesville, Florida
- Game attendance: 85,711
- Game weather: Cloudy
- TV announcers (ABC): Keith Jackson, Bob Griese

Scoring summary
| 1 | 12:51 | FSU | Scott Bentley 40 yard field goal | FSU 3-0 |
| 1 | 5:04 | FLA | Jacquez Green 22 yard pass from Danny Wuerffel (Bart Edmiston kick) | FLA 7-3 |
| 1 | 0:27 | FSU | Scott Bentley 38 yard field goal | FLA 7-6 |
| 2 | 11:52 | FLA | Terry Jackson 1 yard run (Bart Edmiston kick) | FLA 14-6 |
| 2 | 3:54 | FLA | Ike Hilliard 42 yard pass from Danny Wuerffel (Bart Edmiston kick) | FLA 21-6 |
| 2 | 0:47 | FLA | Chris Doering 20 yard pass from Danny Wuerffel (Bart Edmiston kick) | FLA 28-6 |
| 3 | 4:30 | FSU | Warrick Dunn 3 yard run (Danny Kanell to E.G. Green pass) | FLA 28-14 |
| 3 | 4:10 | FLA | Ike Hilliard 74 yard pass from Danny Wuerffel (Bart Edmiston kick) | FLA 35-14 |
| 3 | 2:20 | FSU | Scott Bentley 27 yard field goal | FLA 35-17 |
| 3 | 0:53 | FSU | Andre Cooper 8 yard pass from Danny Kanell (Scott Bentley kick) | FLA 35-24 |

The rival Florida State Seminoles were beaten 35–24. Danny Wuerffel threw for 453 yards and four touchdowns as Florida held off a second-half rally by Florida State and erased the memories of the "Choke at Doak" from the previous season.

A 42-yard pass to Ike Hilliard, who evaded multiple defenders on the run after the catch, made it 21–6. The Gators intercepted the Noles three times in the last quarter. Florida tied the all-time school record for consecutive wins with 11.

=== Arkansas ===
SEC Championship

| Team | 1 | 2 | 3 | 4 | Total |
|---|---|---|---|---|---|
| Arkansas | 3 | 0 | 0 | 0 | 3 |
| • Florida | 14 | 3 | 14 | 3 | 34 |

- Date: December 2
- Location: Georgia Dome, Atlanta
- Game attendance: 71,324
- TV announcers (ABC): Keith Jackson, Bob Griese

Scoring summary
| 1 | ? | ARK | Latourette 36 yard field goal | ARK 3-0 |
| 1 | ? | FLA | Chris Doering 22 yard pass from Danny Wuerffel (Bart Edmiston kick) | FLA 7-3 |
| 1 | ? | FLA | Danny Wuerffel 1 yard run (Bart Edmiston kick) | FLA 14-3 |
| 2 | ? | FLA | Bart Edmiston 31 yard field goal | FLA 17-3 |
| 3 | ? | FLA | Ike Hilliard 29 yard pass from Danny Wuerffel (Bart Edmiston kick) | FLA 24-3 |
| 3 | ? | FLA | Ben Hanks 95 yard fumble return (Bart Edmiston kick) | FLA 31-3 |
| 4 | ? | FLA | Bart Edmiston 20 yard field goal | FLA 34-3 |

The Gators faced the Arkansas Razorbacks in the SEC Championship Game and ran away with it 34–3. The Razorbacks led 3-0 after a long, game-opening drive on which tailback Madre Hill suffered a knee injury.

Following a 36-yard field goal from Arkansas, Florida drove 80 yards in seven plays, with Wuerffel completing a 22-yard touchdown pass to Chris Doering. The Gators never looked back, scoring 34 unanswered points and securing a spot against Nebraska in the national title game.

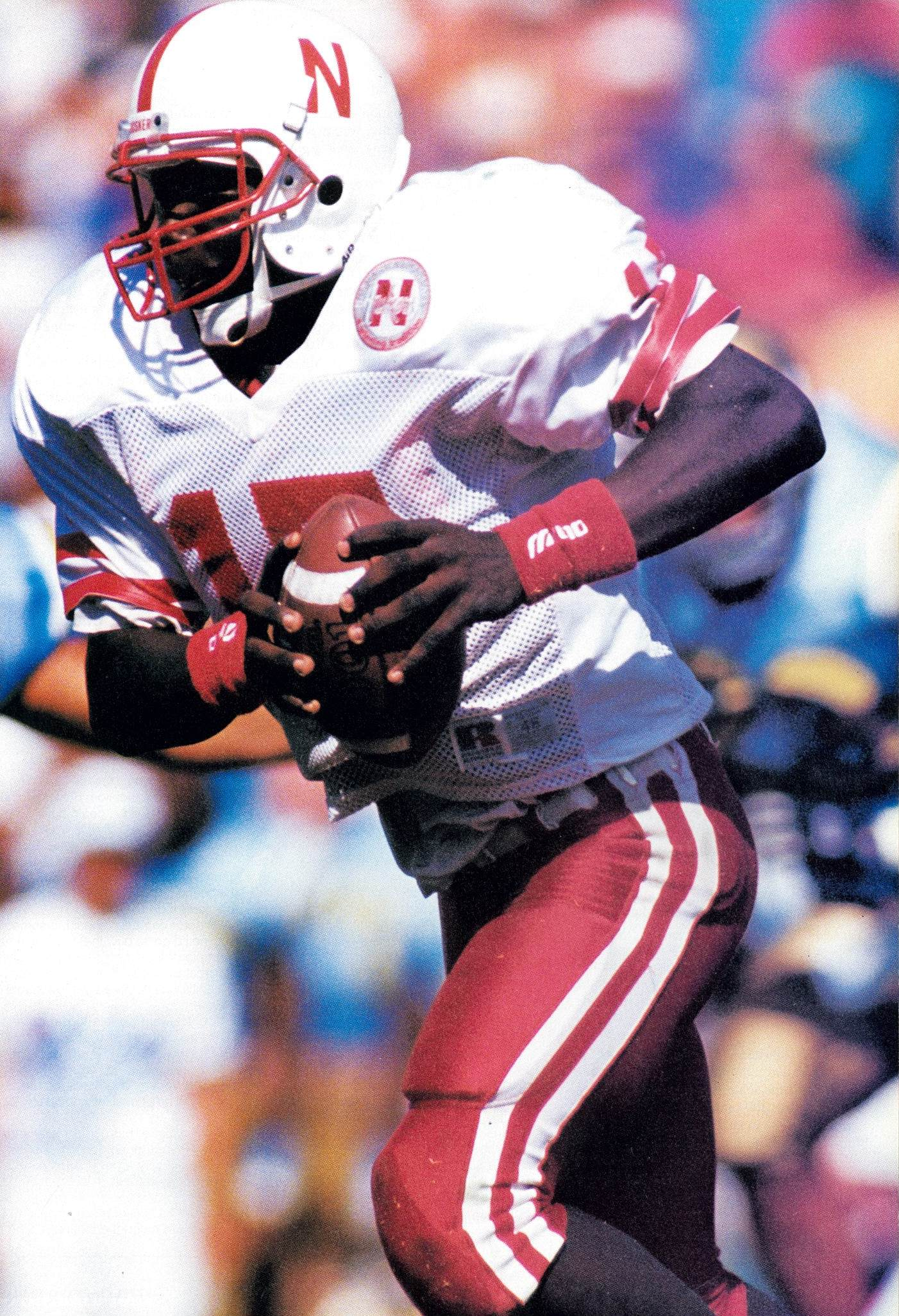
Tommie Frazier

=== Nebraska ===
National Championship: Fiesta Bowl

| Team | 1 | 2 | 3 | 4 | Total |
|---|---|---|---|---|---|
| Florida | 10 | 0 | 8 | 6 | 24 |
| • Nebraska | 6 | 29 | 14 | 13 | 62 |

- Date: January 2, 1996
- Location: Sun Devil Stadium, Tempe, Arizona
- Game attendance: 79,864

The Gators faced #1 ranked Nebraska in the Fiesta Bowl for the Bowl Alliance national championship. Florida received the opening kickoff and drove to the Nebraska 5, before settling for a 23-yard Bart Edmiston field goal. Aided by good field position, the Huskers countered on their opening series with a 53-yard scoring drive, capped by a 16-yard cross-field throwback pass from Tommie Frazier to Lawrence Phillips. The Gators blocked the Huskers' extra point, and Nebraska led 6–3. Late in the period, Florida went back ahead on a short 1-yard sneak from Wuerffel and led 10–6. As the Gators scored, CBS' Terry Donahue stated, "Nebraska better not get too far behind." The Huskers then put the game out of reach with a 29-point explosion in the second quarter, making it 35–10 at the half.

Florida continued to struggle against Nebraska's aggressive, blitzing defense. In the third period, on second down from the Nebraska 25, Cornhuskers quarterback Frazier ran an option play to the right, and decided to keep the ball rather than pitch. He gained 11 yards before being met by a group of Florida defenders at the 36-yard line, which he then dragged approximately 10 yards before shrugging them off and breaking free, streaking 75 yards down the sideline to give Nebraska a 49–18 lead. Frazier had broken no fewer than seven tackles on the play. The game ended 62 to 24.

For much of the summer of 1996, a common joke on ESPN was "Hey Gators, Nebraska just scored again." The Gators would use the Fiesta Bowl rout as a rallying point for the 1996 season, in which they won the first national championship in school history. The 1995 Nebraska squad has been voted as the greatest college football team of all-time in many surveys, including the all-time Sagarin ratings. An ESPN poll has them at #3, only behind the 1971 Huskers and 1972 USC Trojans.

== Roster ==
1995 Florida Gators football team roster
Players
Coaches
Offense

| Pos. | # | Name | Class |
|---|---|---|---|
| TE | 91 | Tremayne Allen | Sr |
| WR | 89 | Reidel Anthony | So |
| WR | 28 | Chris Doering | Sr |
| WR | 83 | Jacquez Green | So |
| WR | 1 | Jack Jackson | Sr |
| WR | 81 | Travis McGriff | So |
| G | 71 | Jeff Mitchell | Jr |
| OT | 74 | Jason Odom | Sr |
| RB | 33 | Fred Taylor | So |
| QB | 7 | Danny Wuerffel | Jr |

Defense

| Pos. | # | Name | Class |
|---|---|---|---|
| DT | 67 | Mark Campbell | Sr |
| SS | 4 | Lawrence Wright | Jr |
| SS | 20 | Sammy McCorkle | Sr |

Special teams

| Pos. | # | Name | Class |

Head coach

- Steve Spurrier

Coordinators/assistant coaches

- Rod Broadway (DL)
- Carl Franks (OC/RB)
- Jay Hopson (GA)

Legend

- (C) Team captain
- (S) Suspended
- (I) Ineligible
- Injured
- Redshirt
