= Jamie Howard =

American football player (born 1973)

No. 4
- Position: Quarterback

Personal information
- Born: December 7, 1973 (age 52); Laurel, Mississippi, U.S.
- Listed height: 6 ft 1 in (1.85 m)
- Listed weight: 212 lb (96 kg)

Career information
- High school: St. Thomas More (Lafayette, Louisiana)
- College: LSU (1992–1995)

James Walker Howard III (born December 7, 1973) is an American former college football quarterback who played for the LSU Tigers.

== Early life ==
Howard attended St. Thomas More High School in Lafayette, Louisiana. He lettered in four sports while in high school: football, baseball, track, and basketball. He was drafted in the second round of the 1992 MLB draft by the Atlanta Braves as a pitcher. Howard, overall pick #59, was selected immediately after the Oakland Athletics selected future MVP and All Star Jason Giambi at #58.

== College career ==
Howard lettered all four years at LSU and was the first true freshman to start at quarterback for LSU since Steve Ensminger in 1976. He started six games, and played in eight, as a freshman, started ten games as a sophomore, nine his junior year and seven as a senior. Howard remained a member of the Atlanta Braves organization while enrolled at LSU and played in the Braves' minor leagues after his freshman and sophomore seasons. In his first three years at LSU, he struggled with interceptions, throwing 17 his junior year.

He returned for his senior season in 1995 as the Tigers' starting quarterback after sitting out the summer from the Atlanta Braves' organization. He injured his shoulder midway through the 1995 season in a game against Florida and missed a month of games.

Howard finished his career as the third-leading passer in LSU history with 6,158 yards and second in career touchdown passes with 34.

=== Statistics ===
			Passing						Rushing		
Season	Team	GP	Comp	Att	Pct	Yds	TD	INT	Att	Yds	TD
1992	LSU Tigers	8	101	200	50.5	1,349	5	13	15	–2	0
1993	LSU Tigers	10	106	248	42.7	1,319	7	12	45	0	0
1994	LSU Tigers	11	140	274	51.1	1,997	13	17	49	-53	1
1995	LSU Tigers	7	112	212	52.8	1,493	9	5	20	-93	0
Totals		36	459	934	49.1	6,158	34	47	129	–148	1

== Personal life ==
Howard's son, Walker Howard, played quarterback at LSU and for the Ole Miss Rebels he is currently a quarterback for the Louisiana Ragin Cajuns .
