= Ben Hanks =

American football player (born 1972)

No. 51, 50, 55, 58
- Position: Linebacker

Personal information
- Born: July 31, 1972 (age 54); Miami, Florida, U.S.
- Listed height: 6 ft 2 in (1.88 m)
- Listed weight: 223 lb (101 kg)

Career information
- High school: Miami
- College: Florida (1991–1995)
- NFL draft: 1996: undrafted

Career history
- Minnesota Vikings (1996); Detroit Lions (1997); Rhein Fire (1999); New York/New Jersey Hitmen (2001)

Awards and highlights
- 2× First-team All-SEC (1994, 1995)
- Stats at Pro Football Reference

Benjamin Ujean Hanks (born July 31, 1972) is an American former professional football linebacker who played two seasons in the National Football League (NFL) with the Minnesota Vikings and Detroit Lions. He played college football at Florida. He was also a member of the Rhein Fire of NFL Europe and the New York/New Jersey Hitmen of the XFL.

== Early life ==
Benjamin Ujean Hanks was born on July 31, 1972, in Miami, Florida. He attended Miami Senior High School, lettering in football, baseball, and track. In football, he earned all-state and Dade County MVP honors.

== College career ==
Hanks was a member of the Florida Gators from 1991 to 1995. He was redshirted in 1991. He was then a four-year letterman from 1992 to 1995. He garnered Associated Press (AP) second-team and Coaches first-team All-SEC recognition as a junior in 1994. He was named first-team All-SEC by both the AP and the coaches his senior year in 1995. He set a school record for longest fumble return touchdown with a 95-yarder. He graduated from Florida with a degree in public recreation.

== Professional career ==
After going undrafted in the 1996 NFL draft, Hanks signed with the Minnesota Vikings on April 22. He played in 12 games for the Vikings during the 1996 season, recording three solo tackles and two assisted tackles, before being placed on injured reserve on December 20, 1996. He was waived by the Vikings in 1997.

Hanks was claimed off waivers by the Detroit Lions on August 25, 1997. He appeared in two games during the 1997 season before being waived on September 30. He was re-signed by the Lions on December 23 and later played in one playoff game for them that year. Hanks became a free agent after the season and re-signed with the team on March 26, 1998. He was waived on August 25, 1998.

Hanks played for the Rhein Fire of NFL Europe in 1999, totaling 19 defensive tackles, six special teams tackles, one sack, and two forced fumbles.

Hanks played in nine games, starting five, for the New York/New Jersey Hitmen of the XFL in 2001, posting 17 tackles and one sack.

== Personal life ==
His son, Ben Hanks III, plays college football for the Florida Gators.
