= Juan Daniels =

American football player (born 1973)

Juan Daniels (born December 10, 1973) is a former American football wide receiver in the Arena Football League who played for the Nashville Kats. He played college football for the Georgia Bulldogs. He also played in NFL Europe for the Amsterdam Admirals.
