= 1995 Georgia Bulldogs football team =

American college football season

1995 Georgia Bulldogs football

Peach Bowl, L 27–34 vs. Virginia
- Conference: Southeastern Conference
- Eastern Division
- Record: 6–6 (3–5 SEC)
- Head coach: Ray Goff (7th season)
- Offensive coordinator: Wayne McDuffie (5th season)
- Offensive scheme: No-huddle spread
- Defensive coordinator: Joe Kines (1st season)
- Base defense: 4–3
- Home stadium: Sanford Stadium

1995 Southeastern Conference football standings
	Conf.					Overall
Team	W		L		T	W		L		T
Eastern Division
No. 2 Florida x$	8	–	0	–	0	12	–	1	–	0
No. 3 Tennessee	7	–	1	–	0	11	–	1	–	0
Georgia	3	–	5	–	0	6	–	6	–	0
South Carolina	2	–	5	–	1	4	–	6	–	1
Kentucky	2	–	6	–	0	4	–	7	–	0
Vanderbilt	1	–	7	–	0	2	–	9	–	0
Western Division
Arkansas x	6	–	2	–	0	8	–	5	–	0
No. 21 Alabama	5	–	3	–	0	8	–	3	–	0
No. 22 Auburn	5	–	3	–	0	8	–	4	–	0
LSU	4	–	3	–	1	7	–	4	–	1
Ole Miss	3	–	5	–	0	6	–	5	–	0
Mississippi State	1	–	7	–	0	3	–	8	–	0
Championship: Florida 34, Arkansas 3
$ – Conference champion; x – Division champion/co-champions; Rankings from AP Poll

The 1995 Georgia Bulldogs football team represented the University of Georgia as a member of the Eastern Division of the Southeastern Conference (SEC) during the 1995 NCAA Division I-A football season. Led by seventh-year head coach Ray Goff, the Bulldogs compiled an overall record of 6–6, with a mark of 3–5 in conference play, and finished third in the SEC Eastern Division.

== Schedule ==
Date	Time	Opponent	Rank	Site	TV	Result	Attendance	Source
September 2	12:30 p.m.	South Carolina		Sanford Stadium; Athens, GA (rivalry)	JPS	W 42–23	86,117	
September 9	6:45 p.m.	at No. 8 Tennessee		Neyland Stadium; Knoxville, TN (rivalry, College GameDay)	ESPN	L 27–30	95,797	
September 16	1:00 p.m.	New Mexico State*	No. 23	Sanford Stadium; Athens, GA		W 40–13	78,911	
September 23	7:00 p.m.	at Ole Miss	No. 20	Vaught–Hemingway Stadium; Oxford, MS		L 10–18	39,437	
September 30	12:00 p.m.	No. 20 Alabama		Sanford Stadium; Athens, GA (rivalry)	ABC	L 0–31	86,117	
October 7	6:30 p.m.	at Clemson*		Memorial Stadium; Clemson, SC (rivalry)		W 19–17	81,670	
October 14	12:30 p.m.	at Vanderbilt		Vanderbilt Stadium; Nashville, TN (rivalry)	JPS	W 17–6	24,986	
October 21	12:30 p.m.	Kentucky^{†}		Sanford Stadium; Athens, GA	JPS	W 12–3	85,412	
October 28	3:30 p.m.	No. 3 Florida		Sanford Stadium; Athens, GA (rivalry)	ABC	L 17–52	86,117	
November 11	5:00 p.m.	No. 20 Auburn		Sanford Stadium; Athens, GA (Deep South's Oldest Rivalry)	ESPN	L 31–37	86,117	
November 23	11:00 a.m.	at Georgia Tech*		Bobby Dodd Stadium; Atlanta, GA (Clean, Old-Fashioned Hate)	ABC	W 18–17	45,245	
December 30	8:00 p.m.	vs. No. 18 Virginia*		Georgia Dome; Atlanta, GA (Peach Bowl)	ESPN	L 27–34	70,825	
*Non-conference game; ^{†}Homecoming; Rankings from AP Poll released prior to the game; All times are in Eastern time

== Roster ==
1995 Georgia Bulldogs football team roster
Players
Coaches
Offense

Pos.	#	Name	Class
RB	30	Robert Arnaud	Fr
QB	14	Mike Bobo	So
RB	15	Larry Bowie	Sr
RB	32	Selma Calloway
WR	12	Juan Daniels
RB	47	Robert Edwards	RSo
WR	88	Brice Hunter	Sr
WR	19	Hines Ward	So
TE	87	Larry Brown	Fr
RB	43	Marisa Simpson
RT	71	Adam Meadows	Jr
RG	70	Resty Beadles
C	55	David Weeks	Sr
LG	52	Paul Taylor
LT	75	Troy Stark	Sr
RB	20	Torin Kirtsey	Fr
RG	79	Matt Stinchcomb	Fr
QB	11	Brian Smith	Jr

Defense

Pos.	#	Name	Class
FS	16	Kirby Smart	Fr
DL	89	Phillip Daniels	Sr
LB	42	Randall Godrey	Sr
LB	36	Whit Marshall	Sr
LB	45	Greg Bright	So
NT	99	Keith Drayton
DL	96	Paul Snellings
DL	92	Jason Ferguson	Jr
FS	27	Corey Johnson	Jr
SS	9	Armin Love	RFr
DB	3	Buster Owens
DL	66	Travis Stroud	So
LB	48	Phillip Benton
DB	22	Alandus Sims
DL	98	Jermaine Smith	Jr
LB	28	Brandon Tolbert
DB	5	Ronald Bailey	So

Special teams

Pos.	#	Name	Class
PK	6	Kanon Parkman
P	2	Dax Langley
PR	23	Chris McCranie

Head coach

- Ray Goff

Coordinators/assistant coaches

- Joe Kines DC
- Wayne McDuffie OC

Legend

- (C) Team captain
- (S) Suspended
- (I) Ineligible
- Injured
- Redshirt
