= 1995 Tennessee Volunteers football team =

American college football season

1995 Tennessee Volunteers football

Florida Citrus Bowl champion

Florida Citrus Bowl, W 20–14 vs. Ohio State
- Conference: Southeastern Conference
- Eastern Division

Ranking
- Coaches: No. 2
- AP: No. 3
- Record: 11–1 (7–1 SEC)
- Head coach: Phillip Fulmer (3rd season)
- Offensive coordinator: David Cutcliffe (3rd season)
- Offensive scheme: Pro-style
- Defensive coordinator: John Chavis (1st season)
- Base defense: Multiple 4–3
- Captains: Scott Galyon; Jason Layman; Bubba Miller
- Home stadium: Neyland Stadium

1995 Southeastern Conference football standings
	Conf.					Overall
Team	W		L		T	W		L		T
Eastern Division
No. 2 Florida x$	8	–	0	–	0	12	–	1	–	0
No. 3 Tennessee	7	–	1	–	0	11	–	1	–	0
Georgia	3	–	5	–	0	6	–	6	–	0
South Carolina	2	–	5	–	1	4	–	6	–	1
Kentucky	2	–	6	–	0	4	–	7	–	0
Vanderbilt	1	–	7	–	0	2	–	9	–	0
Western Division
Arkansas x	6	–	2	–	0	8	–	5	–	0
No. 21 Alabama	5	–	3	–	0	8	–	3	–	0
No. 22 Auburn	5	–	3	–	0	8	–	4	–	0
LSU	4	–	3	–	1	7	–	4	–	1
Ole Miss	3	–	5	–	0	6	–	5	–	0
Mississippi State	1	–	7	–	0	3	–	8	–	0
Championship: Florida 34, Arkansas 3
$ – Conference champion; x – Division champion/co-champions; Rankings from AP Poll

The 1995 Tennessee Volunteers football team represented the University of Tennessee as a member of the Eastern Division of the Southeastern Conference (SEC) during the 1995 NCAA Division I-A football season. Led by third-year head coach Phillip Fulmer, the Vols compiled an overall record of 11–1, with a mark of 7–1 in conference play, and finished second in the SEC Eastern Division. Tennessee concluded their season with a victory in the Florida Citrus Bowl over Ohio State.

== Schedule ==
Date	Time	Opponent	Rank	Site	TV	Result	Attendance	Source
September 2	7:00 p.m.	East Carolina*	No. 8	Neyland Stadium; Knoxville, TN	PPV	W 27–7	95,416	
September 9	7:45 p.m.	Georgia	No. 8	Neyland Stadium; Knoxville, TN (rivalry, College GameDay)	ESPN	W 30–27	95,797	
September 16	3:30 p.m.	at No. 4 Florida	No. 8	Ben Hill Griffin Stadium; Gainesville, FL (rivalry)	ABC	L 37–62	85,105	
September 23	3:30 p.m.	Mississippi State	No. 15	Neyland Stadium; Knoxville, TN	ABC	W 52–14	95,232	
September 30	4:00 p.m.	Oklahoma State*	No. 12	Neyland Stadium; Knoxville, TN	PPV	W 31–0	95,319	
October 7	2:00 p.m.	at No. 18 Arkansas	No. 10	Razorback Stadium; Fayetteville, AR	PPV	W 49–31	52,728	
October 14	7:30 p.m.	at No. 12 Alabama	No. 6	Legion Field; Birmingham, AL (Third Saturday in October, College GameDay)	ESPN	W 41–14	83,091	
October 28	12:30 p.m.	South Carolina	No. 6	Neyland Stadium; Knoxville, TN	JPS	W 56–21	95,426	
November 4	1:00 p.m.	Southern Miss*	No. 5	Neyland Stadium; Knoxville, TN	PPV	W 42–0	93,433	
November 18	12:30 p.m.	at Kentucky	No. 4	Commonwealth Stadium; Lexington, KY (rivalry)	JPS	W 34–31	52,300	
November 25	12:30 p.m.	Vanderbilt	No. 5	Neyland Stadium; Knoxville, TN (rivalry)	JPS	W 12–7	92,274	
January 1	1:00 p.m.	vs. No. 4 Ohio State*	No. 4	Citrus Bowl; Orlando, FL (Florida Citrus Bowl)	ABC	W 20–14	70,797	
*Non-conference game; Rankings from AP Poll released prior to the game; All times are in Eastern time

== Roster ==
1995 Tennessee Volunteers football team roster
Players
Coaches
Offense

Pos.	#	Name	Class
RB	25	Jay Graham	Jr
WR	11	Joey Kent	Jr
G	66	Jason Layman	Sr
QB	16	Peyton Manning	So

Defense

Pos.	#	Name	Class
DT	84	Shane Burton	Sr
LB	93	Scott Galyon	Sr
CB	18	DeRon Jenkins	Sr
DE	1	Leonard Little	So
DE	64	Steve White	Sr

Special teams

Pos.	#	Name	Class

Head coach

- Phillip Fulmer

Coordinators/assistant coaches

- David Cutcliffe – Offensive coordinator/assistant head coach/quarterbacks
- Randy Sanders – Running backs/recruiting coordinator
- Pat Washington – Wide receivers
- Mark Bradley – Tight ends
- Steve Marshall – Offensive line
- John Chavis – Defensive coordinator/linebackers
- Dan Brooks – Defensive line
- Kevin Ramsey – Defensive backs
- Steve Caldwell – Special teams/defensive ends

Legend

- (C) Team captain
- (S) Suspended
- (I) Ineligible
- Injured
- Redshirt

== Team players drafted into the NFL ==
Player	Position	Round	Pick	NFL club
Jason Layman	Tackle	2	48	Houston Oilers
DeRon Jenkins	Defensive back	2	55	Baltimore Ravens
Shane Burton	Defensive end	5	150	Miami Dolphins
Nilo Silvan	Wide receiver	6	180	Tampa Bay Buccaneers
Scott Galyon	Linebacker	6	182	New York Giants
Steve White	Defensive end	6	194	Philadelphia Eagles
Leslie Ratliffe	Tackle	7	213	Denver Broncos
Jeff Smith	Center	7	241	Kansas City Chiefs
