= 1995 Arkansas Razorbacks football team =

American college football season

1995 Arkansas Razorbacks football

SEC Western Division champion

SEC Championship Game, L 3–34 vs. Florida

Carquest Bowl, L 10–20 vs. North Carolina
- Conference: Southeastern Conference
- Western Division
- Record: 8–5 (6–2 SEC)
- Head coach: Danny Ford (3rd season)
- Defensive coordinator: Joe Lee Dunn (1st season)
- Base defense: 3–3–5
- Captains: Steve Conley; Barry Lunney Jr.
- Home stadium: Razorback Stadium; War Memorial Stadium

1995 Southeastern Conference football standings
	Conf.					Overall
Team	W		L		T	W		L		T
Eastern Division
No. 2 Florida x$	8	–	0	–	0	12	–	1	–	0
No. 3 Tennessee	7	–	1	–	0	11	–	1	–	0
Georgia	3	–	5	–	0	6	–	6	–	0
South Carolina	2	–	5	–	1	4	–	6	–	1
Kentucky	2	–	6	–	0	4	–	7	–	0
Vanderbilt	1	–	7	–	0	2	–	9	–	0
Western Division
Arkansas x	6	–	2	–	0	8	–	5	–	0
No. 21 Alabama	5	–	3	–	0	8	–	3	–	0
No. 22 Auburn	5	–	3	–	0	8	–	4	–	0
LSU	4	–	3	–	1	7	–	4	–	1
Ole Miss	3	–	5	–	0	6	–	5	–	0
Mississippi State	1	–	7	–	0	3	–	8	–	0
Championship: Florida 34, Arkansas 3
$ – Conference champion; x – Division champion/co-champions; Rankings from AP Poll

The 1995 Arkansas Razorbacks football team represented the University of Arkansas as a member of the Western Division of the Southeastern Conference (SEC) during the 1995 NCAA Division I-A football season. Led by third-year head coach Danny Ford, the Razorbacks compiled an overall record of 8–5, with a mark of 6–2 in conference play, and finished first in the SEC Western Division.

The 1995 season was a season of firsts for Arkansas. It saw the Razorbacks beat Alabama, Memphis St, Auburn, and Mississippi St for the first time in school history, as well as winning a game played in the Liberty Bowl in Memphis, Tennessee (vs Ole Miss). 1995 was also the first time that Arkansas won the SEC West Division championship. Sophomore running back Madre Hill broke the Arkansas single season rushing yards record (1,387), and the single game rushing touchdown record (6 vs South Carolina). Hill was named 1st team All-SEC, along with senior defensive end Steve Conley, who tied the Arkansas single season sacks record (14). Senior QB Barry Lunney Jr. ended his career as Arkansas' career leader in pass attempts, pass completions, and passing yards. All of his records have since been broken by various Arkansas quarterbacks. Lunney also started 40 career games for the Hogs.

== Schedule ==
Date	Time	Opponent	Rank	Site	TV	Result	Attendance	Source
September 2	7:00 p.m.	at SMU*		Cotton Bowl; Dallas, TX		L 14–17	29,107	
September 9	2:00 p.m.	South Carolina		Razorback Stadium; Fayetteville, AR		W 51–21	46,821	
September 16	11:30 a.m.	at No. 13 Alabama		Bryant–Denny Stadium; Tuscaloosa, AL	JPS	W 20–19	70,123	
September 23	6:00 p.m.	Memphis*		War Memorial Stadium; Little Rock, AR		W 27–20	54,418	
September 30	1:00 p.m.	at Vanderbilt	No. 23	Vanderbilt Stadium; Nashville, TN		W 35–7	25,981	
October 7	2:00 p.m.	No. 10 Tennessee	No. 18	Razorback Stadium; Fayetteville, AR	PPV	L 31–49	52,728	
October 14	1:00 p.m.	vs. Ole Miss		Liberty Bowl Memorial Stadium; Memphis, TN (rivalry)		W 13–6	29,104	
October 28	6:30 p.m.	No. 11 Auburn		War Memorial Stadium; Little Rock, AR	ESPN	W 30–28	55,630	
November 4	11:30 a.m.	Mississippi State	No. 18	War Memorial Stadium; Little Rock, AR	JPS	W 26–21	52,787	
November 11	1:00 p.m.	Southwestern Louisiana*^{†}	No. 15	Razorback Stadium; Fayetteville, AR		W 24–13	44,567	
November 18	2:30 p.m.	at LSU	No. 14	Tiger Stadium; Baton Rouge, LA (rivalry)	ABC	L 0–28	66,548	
December 2	6:30 p.m.	vs. No. 2 Florida	No. 23	Georgia Dome; Atlanta, GA (SEC Championship Game)	ABC	L 3–34	71,325	
December 30	6:30 p.m.	vs. North Carolina*	No. 24	Joe Robbie Stadium; Miami Gardens, FL (Carquest Bowl)	TBS	L 10–20	34,428	
*Non-conference game; ^{†}Homecoming; Rankings from AP Poll released prior to the game; All times are in Central time

== Roster ==
1995 Arkansas Razorbacks football team roster
Players
Coaches
Offense

Pos.	#	Name	Class
QB	7	Barry Lunney (C)	Sr
RB	34	Madre Hill	So
WR	80	Anthony Lucas	Fr
WR	1	J.J. Meadors	Sr

Defense

Pos.	#	Name	Class
DE	94	Steven Conley	Sr
MLB	44	Mark Smith	Sr

Special teams

Pos.	#	Name	Class

Head coach

- Danny Ford

Coordinators/assistant coaches

- Joe Lee Dunn

Legend

- (C) Team captain
- (S) Suspended
- (I) Ineligible
- Injured
- Redshirt
