= Sheddrick Wilson =

American football player (born 1973)

No. 82
- Position: Wide receiver

Personal information
- Born: November 23, 1973 (age 52); Thomasville, Georgia, U.S.

Career information
- High school: Thomasville
- College: LSU
- NFL draft: 1996: undrafted

Career history
- Houston Oilers (1996); Barcelona Dragons (1997); Philadelphia Eagles (1998)*
- * Offseason or practice squad member only

Awards and highlights
- Second-team All-SEC (1995); All-World League (1997); World Bowl champion (1997)
- Stats at Pro Football Reference

Sheddrick Roderica Wilson (born November 23, 1973) is an American former professional football player who was a wide receiver in the National Football League (NFL). He played college football for the LSU Tigers. He was signed by the Houston Oilers as an undrafted free agent in 1996 and was also a member of the Barcelona Dragons.
