= 1995 SEC Championship Game =

- Conference Championship
- 1995 SEC Championship logo
Florida Gators	Arkansas Razorbacks
(11–0)	(8–3)
34	3
Head coach: Steve Spurrier	Head coach: Danny Ford
AP / Coaches; 2 / 2	AP / Coaches; 23 / 24
	1	2	3	4	Total
Florida	14	3	14	3	34
Arkansas	3	0	0	0	3
- Date: December 2, 1995
- Season: 1995
- Stadium: Georgia Dome
- Location: Atlanta, Georgia
- MVP: QB Danny Wuerffel, Florida
- Favorite: Florida by 24
- Referee: Al Ford
- Attendance: 71,325

United States TV coverage
- Network: ABC
- Nielsen ratings: 7.2

1995 Southeastern Conference football standings
	Conf.					Overall
Team	W		L		T	W		L		T
Eastern Division
No. 2 Florida x$	8	–	0	–	0	12	–	1	–	0
No. 3 Tennessee	7	–	1	–	0	11	–	1	–	0
Georgia	3	–	5	–	0	6	–	6	–	0
South Carolina	2	–	5	–	1	4	–	6	–	1
Kentucky	2	–	6	–	0	4	–	7	–	0
Vanderbilt	1	–	7	–	0	2	–	9	–	0
Western Division
Arkansas x	6	–	2	–	0	8	–	5	–	0
No. 21 Alabama	5	–	3	–	0	8	–	3	–	0
No. 22 Auburn	5	–	3	–	0	8	–	4	–	0
LSU	4	–	3	–	1	7	–	4	–	1
Ole Miss	3	–	5	–	0	6	–	5	–	0
Mississippi State	1	–	7	–	0	3	–	8	–	0
Championship: Florida 34, Arkansas 3
$ – Conference champion; x – Division champion/co-champions; Rankings from AP Poll

The 1995 SEC Championship Game was won by the Florida Gators 34–3 over the Arkansas Razorbacks. The game was played in the Georgia Dome in Atlanta, on December 2, 1995, and was televised to a national audience on ABC.
