= South Carolina Gamecocks football statistical leaders =

The South Carolina Gamecocks football statistical leaders are individual statistical leaders of the South Carolina Gamecocks football program in various categories, including passing, rushing, receiving, total offense, defensive stats, and kicking. Within those areas, the lists identify single-game, single-season, and career leaders. The Gamecocks represent the University of South Carolina in the NCAA's Southeastern Conference.

Although South Carolina began competing in intercollegiate football in 1892, the school's official record book does not generally contain entries from before the late 1940s, as records before this time are often incomplete and inconsistent. These lists are dominated by more recent players for several reasons:

- Since 1949, seasons have increased from 10 games to 11 and then 12 games in length.
- The NCAA didn't allow freshmen to play varsity football until 1972 (with the exception of the World War II years), allowing players to have four-year careers.
- Bowl games only began counting toward single-season and career statistics in 2002. The Gamecocks have played in 10 bowl games since then, allowing players on these teams an additional game to accumulate statistics.

These lists are updated through Week 12 of the 2026 season. Active players are listed in bold.

== Passing ==
=== Passing yards ===
Career
Rank	Player	Yards	Years
1	Todd Ellis	9,953	1986 1987 1988 1989
2	Steve Taneyhill	8,782	1992 1993 1994 1995
3	Stephen Garcia	7,597	2008 2009 2010
4	Jake Bentley	7,527	2016 2017 2018 2019
5	**LaNorris Sellers**	7,244	2023 2024 2025 2026
6	Spencer Rattler	6,212	2022 2023
7	Connor Shaw	6,074	2010 2011 2012 2013
8	Blake Mitchell	5,992	2004 2005 2006 2007
9	Phil Petty	5,656	1998 2000 2001 2002
10	Anthony Wright	5,641	1995 1996 1997 1998

Single season
Rank	Player	Yards	Year
1	Dylan Thompson	3,564	2014
2	Todd Ellis	3,206	1987
3	Spencer Rattler	3,186	2023
4	Jake Bentley	3,171	2018
5	Steve Taneyhill	3,094	1995
6	Stephen Garcia	3,059	2010
7	Spencer Rattler	3,026	2022
8	Todd Ellis	3,020	1986
9	Stephen Garcia	2,862	2009
10	Jake Bentley	2,794	2017

Single game
Rank	Player	Yards	Year	Opponent
1	Jake Bentley	510	2018	Clemson
2	Steve Taneyhill	473	1995	Mississippi State
3	Steve Taneyhill	451	1994	East Carolina
4	Spencer Rattler	438	2022	Tennessee
5	Todd Ellis	425	1987	East Carolina
6	Steve Taneyhill	405	1995	Georgia
7	Dylan Thompson	402	2014	Auburn
8	Spencer Rattler	399	2023	Jacksonville State
9	Todd Ellis	394	1986	Virginia Tech
10	Jake Bentley	390	2016	South Florida

=== Passing touchdowns ===
Career
Rank	Player	TDs	Years
1	Steve Taneyhill	61	1992 1993 1994 1995
2	Connor Shaw	56	2010 2011 2012 2013
3	Jake Bentley	55	2016 2017 2018 2019
4	**LaNorris Sellers**	50	2023 2024 2025 2026
5	Todd Ellis	49	1986 1987 1988 1989
6	Stephen Garcia	47	2008 2009 2010
7	Dylan Thompson	40	2011 2012 2013 2014
8	Anthony Wright	38	1995 1996 1997 1998
	Blake Mitchell	38	2004 2005 2006 2007
10	Spencer Rattler	37	2022 2023

Single season
Rank	Player	TDs	Year
1	Steve Taneyhill	29	1995
2	Jake Bentley	27	2018
3	Dylan Thompson	26	2014
4	Connor Shaw	24	2013
5	Todd Ellis	20	1986
	Steve Taneyhill	20	1994
	Stephen Garcia	20	2010
8	Spencer Rattler	19	2023
9	Anthony Wright	18	1997
	Jake Bentley	18	2017
	Spencer Rattler	18	2022
	LaNorris Sellers	18	2024

Single game
Rank	Player	TDs	Year	Opponent
1	Spencer Rattler	6	2022	Tennessee
2	Tommy Suggs	5	1968	Virginia
	Jeff Grantz	5	1975	Clemson
	Steve Taneyhill	5	1995	Louisiana Tech
	Steve Taneyhill	5	1995	Vanderbilt
	Syvelle Newton	5	2006	Florida Atlantic
	Dylan Thompson	5	2014	Auburn
	Jake Bentley	5	2018	Clemson
	LaNorris Sellers	5	2024	Missouri

== Rushing ==
=== Rushing yards ===
Career
Rank	Player	Yards	Years
1	George Rogers	5,204	1977 1978 1979 1980
2	Brandon Bennett	3,055	1991 1992 1993 1994
3	Harold Green	3,005	1986 1987 1988 1989
4	Steve Wadiak	2,878	1948 1949 1950 1951
5	Thomas Dendy	2,767	1982 1983 1984 1985
6	Marcus Lattimore	2,677	2010 2011 2012
7	Johnnie Wright	2,573	1977 1978 1980 1981
8	Jay Lynn Hodgin	2,478	1972 1973 1974
9	Mike Davis (born 1993)	2,440	2012 2013 2014
10	Kevin Long	2,369	1973 1974 1975 1976

Single season
Rank	Player	Yards	Year
1	George Rogers	1,894	1980
2	George Rogers	1,681	1979
3	Marcus Lattimore	1,197	2010
4	Mike Davis (born 1993)	1,183	2013
5	Kevin Harris	1,138	2020
6	Kevin Long	1,133	1975
7	Duce Staley	1,116	1996
8	Clarence Williams	1,073	1975
9	Derek Watson	1,066	2000
10	Harold Green	1,022	1987

Single game
Rank	Player	Yards	Year	Opponent
1	Brandon Bennett	278	1991	East Tennessee State
2	Jeff Grantz	260	1973	Ohio
3	Steve Wadiak	256	1950	Clemson
4	Marcus Lattimore	246	2011	Navy
5	Kevin Harris	243	2020	Ole Miss
6	George Rogers	237	1978	Wake Forest
7	Rico Dowdle	226	2016	Western Carolina
8	George Rogers	224	1980	Duke
9	George Rogers	217	1979	NC State
10	Derek Watson	215	2000	Eastern Michigan

=== Rushing touchdowns ===
Career
Rank	Player	TDs	Years
1	Marcus Lattimore	38	2010 2011 2012
2	George Rogers	31	1977 1978 1979 1980
	Harold Green	31	1986 1987 1988 1989
4	Andrew Pinnock	27	1999 2000 2001 2002
5	Brandon Bennett	26	1991 1992 1993 1994
	Jeff Grantz	26	1973 1974 1975
7	Thomas Dendy	24	1982 1983 1984 1985
8	Cory Boyd	23	2003 2004 2006 2007
	Kevin Harris	23	2019 2020 2021
10	Jay Lynn Hodgin	22	1972 1973 1974
	Mike Davis (born 1993)	22	2012 2013 2014

Single season
Rank	Player	TDs	Year
1	Marcus Lattimore	17	2010
2	Harold Green	15	1987
	Kevin Harris	15	2020
4	George Rogers	14	1980
5	Jeff Grantz	12	1975
	Andrew Pinnock	12	2001
7	Derek Watson	11	2000
	Marcus Lattimore	11	2012
	Mike Davis (born 1993)	11	2013
	Raheim Sanders	11	2024

Single game
Rank	Player	TDs	Year	Opponent
1	Kevin Harris	5	2020	Ole Miss

== Receiving ==
=== Receptions ===
Career
Rank	Player	Rec	Years
1	Bryan Edwards	234	2016 2017 2018 2019
2	Kenny McKinley	207	2005 2006 2007 2008
3	Alshon Jeffery	183	2009 2010 2011
4	Shi Smith	174	2017 2018 2019 2020
5	Sterling Sharpe	169	1983 1985 1986 1987
6	Zola Davis	164	1995 1996 1997 1998
7	Robert Brooks	156	1988 1989 1990 1991
8	Jermale Kelly	153	1997 1998 1999 2000
9	Deebo Samuel	148	2015 2016 2017 2018
10	Fred Zeigler	146	1967 1968 1969

Single season
Rank	Player	Rec	Year
1	Alshon Jeffery	88	2010
2	Kenny McKinley	77	2007
3	Sterling Sharpe	74	1986
4	Sidney Rice	72	2006
5	Bryan Edwards	71	2019
	Xavier Legette	71	2023
7	Sidney Rice	70	2005
8	Pharoh Cooper	69	2014
9	Antwane Wells Jr.	68	2022
10	Pharoh Cooper	66	2015

Single game
Rank	Player	Rec	Year	Opponent
1	Zola Davis	14	1998	Vanderbilt
	Kenny McKinley	14	2007	Tennessee
	Tori Gurley	14	2010	Vanderbilt
	Deebo Samuel	14	2016	South Florida
	Bryan Edwards	14	2019	Vanderbilt
6	Fred Zeigler	12	1968	Virginia
	Stanley Pritchett	12	1995	Georgia
	Stanley Pritchett	12	1995	Mississippi State
	Sidney Rice	12	2005	Missouri
	Shi Smith	12	2020	Florida

=== Receiving yards ===
Career
Rank	Player	Yards	Years
1	Bryan Edwards	3,045	2016 2017 2018 2019
2	Alshon Jeffery	3,042	2009 2010 2011
3	Kenny McKinley	2,781	2005 2006 2007 2008
4	Sterling Sharpe	2,497	1983 1985 1986 1987
5	Zola Davis	2,354	1995 1996 1997 1998
6	Sidney Rice	2,233	2005 2006
7	Robert Brooks	2,211	1988 1989 1990 1991
8	Shi Smith	2,204	2017 2018 2019 2020
9	Jermale Kelly	2,179	1997 1998 1999 2000
10	Pharoh Cooper	2,163	2013 2014 2015

Single season
Rank	Player	Yards	Year
1	Alshon Jeffery	1,517	2010
2	Xavier Legette	1,255	2023
3	Sidney Rice	1,143	2005
4	Pharoh Cooper	1,136	2014
5	Sterling Sharpe	1,106	1986
6	Sidney Rice	1,090	2006
7	Pharoh Cooper	973	2015
8	Kenny McKinley	968	2007
9	Antwane Wells Jr.	928	2022
10	Sterling Sharpe	915	1987

Single game
Rank	Player	Yards	Year	Opponent
1	Pharoh Cooper	233	2014	Tennessee
2	Xavier Legette	217	2023	Jacksonville State
3	Troy Williamson	210	2004	USF
	Deebo Samuel	210	2018	Clemson
5	Zola Davis	206	1998	Vanderbilt
6	Fred Zeigler	199	1968	Virginia
7	Alshon Jeffery	192	2010	Auburn
8	Sidney Rice	191	2005	Missouri
	Pharoh Cooper	191	2015	The Citadel
10	Deebo Samuel	190	2016	South Florida

=== Receiving touchdowns ===
Career
Rank	Player	TDs	Years
1	Sidney Rice	23	2005 2006
	Alshon Jeffery	23	2009 2010 2011
3	Bryan Edwards	22	2016 2017 2018 2019
4	Robert Brooks	19	1988 1989 1990 1991
	Jermale Kelly	19	1997 1998 1999 2000
	Kenny McKinley	19	2005 2006 2007 2008
7	Pharoh Cooper	18	2013 2014 2015
8	Sterling Sharpe	17	1983 1985 1986 1987
	Zola Davis	17	1995 1996 1997 1998
10	Bruce Ellington	16	2011 2012 2013
	Deebo Samuel	16	2015 2016 2017 2018

Single season
Rank	Player	TDs	Year
1	Sidney Rice	13	2005
2	Deebo Samuel	11	2018
3	Sterling Sharpe	10	1986
	Monty Means	10	1995
	Jermale Kelly	10	1997
	Sidney Rice	10	2006
7	Zola Davis	9	1995
	Kenny McKinley	9	2007
	Alshon Jeffery	9	2010
	Ace Sanders	9	2012
	Pharoh Cooper	9	2014

Single game
Rank	Player	TDs	Year	Opponent
1	Sidney Rice	5	2006	Florida Atlantic

== Total offense ==
Total offense is the sum of passing and rushing statistics. It does not include receiving or returns.

=== Total offense yards ===
Career
Rank	Player	Yards	Years
1	Todd Ellis	9,351	1986 1987 1988 1989
2	**LaNorris Sellers**	8,900	2023 2024 2025 2026
3	Stephen Garcia	8,374	2008 2009 2010 2011
4	Steve Taneyhill	8,164	1992 1993 1994 1995
5	Connor Shaw	7,757	2010 2011 2012 2013
6	Jake Bentley	7,670	2016 2017 2018 2019
7	Spencer Rattler	6,362	2022 2023
8	Blake Mitchell	5,873	2004 2005 2006 2007
9	Anthony Wright	5,834	1995 1996 1997 1998
10	Phil Petty	5,797	1998 1999 2000 2001

Single season
Rank	Player	Yards	Year
1	Dylan Thompson	3,502	2014
2	Spencer Rattler	3,290	2023
3	Stephen Garcia	3,281	2010
4	LaNorris Sellers	3,208	2024
5	Spencer Rattler	3,072	2022
6	Steve Taneyhill	3,056	1995
7	Stephen Garcia	3,048	2009
8	Todd Ellis	3,016	1987
9	Connor Shaw	3,005	2013
10	Jake Bentley	2,993	2018

Single game
Rank	Player	Yards	Year	Opponent
1	Steve Taneyhill	512	1995	Mississippi State
2	Jake Bentley	490	2018	Clemson
3	Spencer Rattler	454	2022	Tennessee
4	Todd Ellis	429	1987	East Carolina
5	Todd Ellis	428	1986	Virginia Tech
6	Steve Taneyhill	421	1994	East Carolina
7	Dylan Thompson	400	2014	Auburn
8	LaNorris Sellers	398	2024	Missouri
9	LaNorris Sellers	397	2026	Oklahoma
10	Connor Shaw	389	2012	Tennessee

=== Total touchdowns ===
Career
Rank	Player	TDs	Years
1	Connor Shaw	73	2010 2011 2012 2013
2	**LaNorris Sellers**	70	2023 2024 2025 2026
3	Jake Bentley	63	2016 2017 2018 2019
4	Steve Taneyhill	62	1992 1993 1994 1995
	Stephen Garcia	62	2008 2009 2010 2011
6	Jeff Grantz	52	1973 1974 1975
	Todd Ellis	52	1986 1987 1988 1989
8	Dylan Thompson	49	1972 1973 1974 1975
9	Anthony Wright	45	1995 1996 1997 1998
10	Spencer Rattler	44	2022 2023

Single season
Rank	Player	TDs	Year
1	Connor Shaw	30	2013
	Dylan Thompson	30	2014
3	Steve Taneyhill	29	1995
	Jake Bentley	29	2018
5	Jeff Grantz	28	1975
6	Stephen Garcia	26	2010
7	LaNorris Sellers	25	2024
8	LaNorris Sellers	24	2026
9	Todd Ellis	23	1986
	Spencer Rattler	23	2023

Single game
Rank	Player	TDs	Year	Opponent
1	Spencer Rattler	6	2022	Tennessee
2	Tommy Suggs	5	1968	Virginia
	Jeff Grantz	5	1975	Clemson
	Steve Taneyhill	5	1995	Louisiana Tech
	Steve Taneyhill	5	1995	Vanderbilt
	Syvelle Newton	5	2006	Florida Atlantic
	Sidney Rice	5	2006	Florida Atlantic
	Dylan Thompson	5	2014	Auburn
	Jake Bentley	5	2018	Clemson
	Kevin Harris	5	2020	Ole Miss
	LaNorris Sellers	5	2024	Missouri
	LaNorris Sellers	5	2026	Florida
	LaNorris Sellers	5	2026	Oklahoma

== Defense ==
=== Interceptions ===
Career
Rank	Player	Ints	Years
1	Bo Davies	14	1969 1970 1971
	Skai Moore	14	2013 2014 2015 2017

Single season
Rank	Player	Ints	Year
1	Bryant Gilliard	9	1984

Single game
Rank	Player	Ints	Year	Opponent
1	Bayard Pickett	4	1949	The Citadel
	Pat Watson	4	1968	Wake Forest
	Bryant Gilliard	4	1984	Florida State

=== Tackles ===
Career
Rank	Player	Tackles	Years
1	JD Fuller	405	1979 1981 1982 1983
2	Andrew Provence	401	1980 1981 1982
3	Mike Durrah	396	1980 1981 1982
4	James Seawright	384	1981 1982 1983 1984
5	Tony Watkins	357	1991 1992 1993 1994
6	Skai Moore	353	2013 2014 2015 2017
7	Rashad Faison	349	1999 2000 2001 2002
8	Kenneth Robinson	340	1982 1983 1985 1986
9	Patrick Hinton	328	1987 1988 1989 1990
10	Ben Washington	326	1994 1995 1996 1997

Single season
Rank	Player	Tackles	Year
1	Mike Durrah	179	1983
2	Garry Mott	167	1973
3	Dana Carpenter	165	1973
4	Bill Cregar	164	1973
	Paul Vogel	164	1984

Single game
Rank	Player	Tackles	Year	Opponent
1	James Seawright	29	1984	NC State

=== Sacks ===
Career
Rank	Player	Sacks	Years
1	Eric Norwood	29.0	2006 2007 2008 2009
2	Andrew Provence	26.0	1980 1981 1982
3	Jadeveon Clowney	24.0	2011 2012 2013
4	John Abraham	23.5	1996 1997 1998 1999
5	Melvin Ingram	21.5	2007 2009 2010 2011
6	Devin Taylor	18.5	2009 2010 2011 2012
7	Cecil Caldwell	15.5	1997 1998 1999 2000
	Cliff Matthews	15.5	2007 2008 2009 2010
9	Stacy Evans	15.0	1993 1994
	Kalimba Edwards	15.0	1998 1999 2000 2001
	George Gause	15.0	2001 2002 2003 2004
	Darius English	15.0	2012 2013 2014 2015 2016
	Kingsley Enagbare	15.0	2018 2019 2020 2021

Single season
Rank	Player	Sacks	Year
1	Jadeveon Clowney	13.0	2012
2	Kyle Kennard	11.5	2024
3	Andrew Provence	10.0	1982
	Melvin Ingram	10.0	2011
5	Kelcy Quarles	9.5	2013
6	Bill Janus	9.0	1978
	Karey Johnson	9.0	1981
	Andrew Provence	9.0	1981
	Eric Norwood	9.0	2008
	Melvin Ingram	9.0	2010
	Darius English	9.0	2016

Single game
Rank	Player	Sacks	Year	Opponent
1	Jadeveon Clowney	4.5	2012	Clemson

== Kicking ==
=== Field goals made ===
Career
Rank	Player	FGs	Years
1	Collin Mackie	72	1987 1988 1989 1990
	Parker White	72	2017 2018 2019 2020 2021
3	Elliott Fry	66	2013 2014 2015 2016
4	Ryan Succop	49	2005 2006 2007 2008
5	Mark Fleetwood	39	1981 1982 1983
	Reed Morton	39	1993 1994 1995 1996
7	Spencer Lanning	34	2007 2008 2009 2010

Single season
Rank	Player	FGs	Year
1	Collin Mackie	25	1987
2	Ryan Succop	20	2008
	Elliott Fry	20	2015
4	Collin Mackie	19	1988
5	Elliott Fry	18	2014
	Parker White	18	2019
7	Mark Fleetwood	17	1982
	Spencer Lanning	17	2009
	Spencer Lanning	17	2010

Single game
Rank	Player	FGs	Year	Opponent
1	Collin Mackie	5	1990	West Virginia
	Spencer Lanning	5	2009	Georgia
3	Mitch Jeter	4	2023	Missouri
	Malik Orsan	4	2026	Mississippi State

=== Field goal percentage ===
Career
Rank	Player	FG%	Years
1	Mitch Jeter	92.0%	2022 2023
2	William Joyce	80.0%	2025
3	Spencer Lanning	77.3%	2007 2008 2009 2010
4	Elliott Fry	75.0%	2013 2014 2015 2016
5	Josh Brown	74.1%	2003 2004 2005
6	Mark Fleetwood	73.6%	1981 1982 1983
7	Collin Mackie	73.5%	1987 1988 1989 1990
8	Parker White	72.7%	2017 2018 2019 2020 2021
9	Reed Morton	72.2%	1993 1994 1995 1996

Single season
Rank	Player	FG%	Year
1	Eddie Leopard	100.0%	
	Mitch Jeter	100.0%	2022
3	Mark Fleetwood	94.4%	
4	Parker White	94.1%	2021
5	Mitch Jeter	85.7%	2023

=== Longest Field Goals made ===
Data since 2004

Longest
Rank	Player	FGs	Year	Opponent
1	Ryan Succop	55	2006	Vanderbilt
2	Elliott Fry	55	2016	Vanderbilt
3	Ryan Succop	54	2008	Arkansas
	Parker White	54	2021	Kentucky
5	Mitch Jeter	53	2022	Georgia State
6	Elliott Fry	52	2015	Central Florida
	Malik Orsan	52	2026	Mississippi State
8	Spencer Lanning	51	2010	Furman
	Adam Yates	51	2012	Florida
	Elliott Fry	51	2015	Georgia
	Mitch Jeter	51	2023	Missouri
	Malik Orsan	51	2026	Mississippi State
