= Tommy Suggs =

American football player

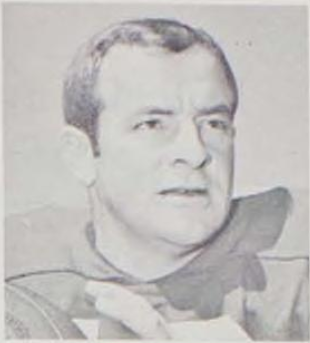
- Suggs, c. 1970

No. 12
- Position: Quarterback

Personal information
- Born: c. 1948–1949
- Listed height: 5 ft 9 in (1.75 m)
- Listed weight: 170 lb (77 kg)

Career information
- High school: Lamar (Lamar, South Carolina)
- College: South Carolina (1968–1970)

Awards and highlights
- South Carolina Athletic Hall of Fame (1983); University of South Carolina Athletic Hall of Fame (1989)

Tommy Suggs (born c. 1948–1949) is an American businessman, sports commentator, and former college football player. He played as the starting quarterback for the South Carolina Gamecocks football team from 1968 to 1970.

A multiple sport athlete in high school, Suggs turned down offers from Davidson College and the New York Mets in order to attend the University of South Carolina. In 1969, Suggs led the Gamecocks to an Atlantic Coast Conference record of 6–0, winning the program their first and only conference championship, as well as a berth in that year's Peach Bowl. The following season, he was named the team's most valuable player and participated in the Blue–Gray Football Classic all-star game, for which he also received MVP honors. He is widely considered one of the best quarterbacks to play at South Carolina and was inducted into both the South Carolina Athletic Hall of Fame in 1983 and the university's athletic hall of fame in 1989.

He graduated in 1971 with a Bachelor of Science in business administration and has since been involved in the banking and insurance industries in South Carolina, having served in executive roles with several different companies. Since 1973, he has also served as the color commentator for the team's radio broadcast, a position he has held for over 50 years. During his time as a broadcaster, he proposed using the fanfare for Also sprach Zarathustra as the team's entrance music, which has been an ongoing tradition since 1983.

== Early life ==
Tommy Suggs was born in either 1948 or 1949. (Note: A 2019 article in The New York Times gives his age at that time as 70, meaning that his year of birth is either 1948 or 1949.) He grew up in Lamar, South Carolina. In his youth, he worked in agriculture, helping to harvest cotton and tobacco. He attended Lamar High School, where he played for the school's baseball, basketball, and football teams. During a high school basketball all-star game, he played alongside Pete Maravich. Before he graduated from high school, he had been offered an athletic scholarship from Lefty Driesell to play college basketball for him at Davidson College. However, Suggs declined the offer in order to play college football for the South Carolina Gamecocks at the University of South Carolina. Suggs also declined an offer from the New York Mets, who offered him a contract on the provision that he stopped playing football. While Suggs had been a fan of the Clemson Tigers as a child, he pursued the University of South Carolina because he wanted to major in their business program and because he liked their head coach, Paul Dietzel.

== College career ==
Suggs enrolled at the University of South Carolina in either 1966 or 1967. (Note: A 2013 article in The State states that he entered the University of South Carolina in 1966, while a 2019 article in The New York Times states that he started college in 1967.) Between 1968 and 1970, he served as the starting quarterback for the Gamecocks. During the 1969 season, he had a height of 5 feet 9 inches (1.75 m) and weighed 170 pounds (77 kg). In his first season, he set a school record by throwing five passing touchdowns in a game against the Virginia Cavaliers. The next season, he recorded 1,342 passing yards and led the team to a championship record in the Atlantic Coast Conference, with an undefeated 6–0 conference record. As of 2023, the 1969 team remains the only conference championship team in the university's history. The team's performance granted them a berth in the 1969 Peach Bowl. Going into the 1970 season, the Gamecocks hired a new offensive coordinator, John Bridges, who emphasized a more pass-heavy offense. Suggs was happy with the change, as prior to this, he had often quarreled with Dietzel, who favored a more rush-heavy offense. Following the 1970 season, where he was named the Gamecocks' most valuable player (MVP), he participated in the Blue–Gray Football Classic college all-star game, winning the game's MVP award.

In total, Suggs recorded 4,916 passing yards over the course of his career at South Carolina, in addition to 34 passing touchdowns. Additionally, in all three years that Suggs played, the Gamecocks never lost a game against the Clemson Tigers, as part of their rivalry. He graduated from the university in 1971 with a Bachelor of Science (BS) degree in business administration from the Darla Moore School of Business.

=== College statistics ===
Season	Team	Passing							Rushing			
Season	Team	Cmp	Att	Yds	Pct	TD	Int	Rtg	Att	Yds	Avg	TD
1968	South Carolina	110	207	1,544	53.1	13	12	124.9	71	114	1.6	3
1969	South Carolina	100	179	1,244	55.9	7	10	116.0	63	93	1.5	1
1970	South Carolina	136	269	2,030	50.6	14	18	117.7	46	−82	−1.8	0
Career		346	655	4,818	52.8	34	40	119.5	180	125	0.7	4

== Broadcasting career ==
During his time at South Carolina, Suggs was active in the Fellowship of Christian Athletes and was a public speaker at many of the association's events. Dietzel, who was also the university's athletic director at the time, had also been active in the fellowship and had shared some speaking arrangements with Suggs. In the early 1970s, Dietzel offered Suggs a position as a sports commentator for the football program's radio broadcasts. In 1973, Suggs became the team's color commentator, with longtime broadcaster Bob Fulton serving as the play-by-play commentator. Dietzel had selected Suggs in part because he wanted to mimic the format of the recently debuted Monday Night Football program, which featured a former player as the color commentator.

According to Suggs, he felt that he did a poor job in his first season and did not believe that he would be returning for the 1974 season. However, he remained on, and in 2022, Suggs celebrated his 50th season as the color commentator for the South Carolina Gamecocks football team. He has worked alongside three different play-by-play commentators, and his career spans twelve different head coaches and nine athletic directors. Only Bill Hillgrove of the Pittsburgh Panthers has a longer tenure as a broadcaster for a major collegiate football program, as he has been employed for three years longer than Suggs. Additionally, as of 2022, Suggs has missed only one game.

=== Also sprach Zarathustra ===
In the 1970s, Suggs attended two Elvis Presley concerts, including a 1977 event at the Carolina Coliseum. During these performances, Presley used the fanfare for Also sprach Zarathustra—well known for its use in the 1968 film 2001: A Space Odyssey—as his entrance music. Suggs felt that the fanfare could be played during Gamecocks games and pitched the idea to head coach Jim Carlen. Carlen had the Carolina Band play the piece during two games in the 1981 season, but the audience had a difficult time hearing the piece. Carlen left South Carolina at the end of the season, and while Athletic Director Bob Marcum liked the idea of playing the 2001 theme, its reintroduction was postponed until the 1983 season in order to allow for upgrades to the sound system at Williams–Brice Stadium. The theme has been used as the football team's entrance music every season since then and is considered a team tradition.

== Awards and honors ==
In 1983, Suggs was inducted into the South Carolina Athletic Hall of Fame, and in 1989, he was inducted into the University of South Carolina's Athletic Hall of Fame. In 2014, the university's athletics department stated in an article on their website that Suggs is "[r]egarded as one of the school's all-time greatest quarterbacks". In 2017, The Post and Courier ranked him as the fourth greatest quarterback in the university's history, behind Connor Shaw, Steve Taneyhill, and Todd Ellis, while a 2021 poll conducted by The State listed Suggs on their "Mount Rushmore" of South Carolina's four greatest quarterbacks, alongside Ellis, Shaw, and Taneyhill.

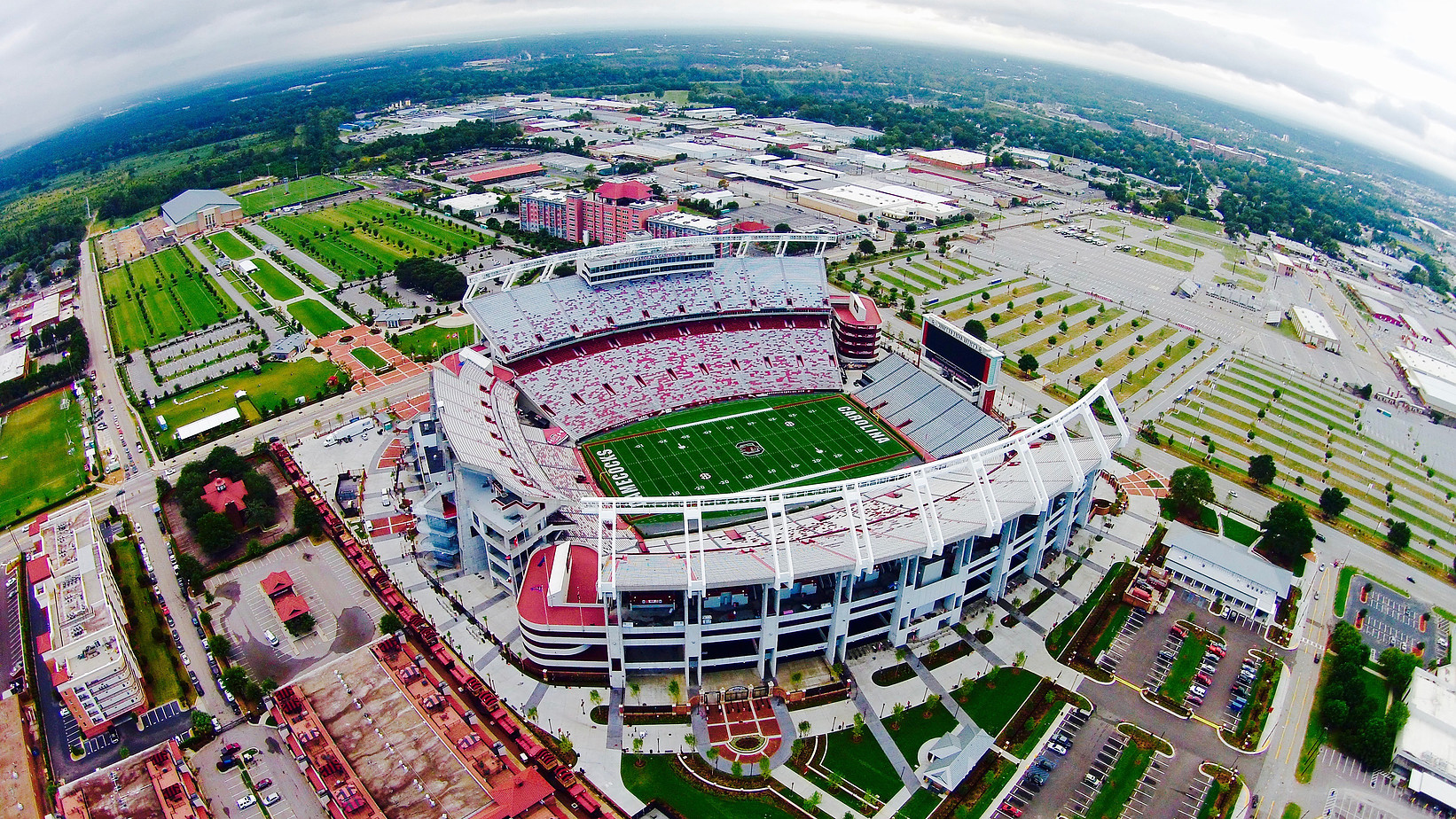
Both a walkway near Williams–Brice Stadium (pictured 2015) and the players' entrance bear Suggs's name.

In 2012, the Tommy Suggs Endowed Quarterback Scholarship was established by friends and colleagues of Suggs's in order to provide an annual scholarship for a quarterback on the South Carolina team. That same year, the Darla Moore School of Business awarded him an honorary doctorate degree. (Note: A 2016 article from WOLO-TV states that he was granted the honorary degree in 2012. However, the University of South Carolina Alumni Association's website states that he received the degree in 2011.) In 2016, the central promenade in Gamecock Park, a park located near the Gamecocks' stadium, was named in his honor as the "Tommy Suggs Garnet Way". On January 30, 2020, the South Carolina Broadcasters Association recognized his then-47-year career as color commentator with an Honorary Life Membership in the group. Former Gamecocks head coach Steve Spurrier, who is a close friend of Suggs's, was in attendance at the ceremony. In 2024, the players' entrance onto the field at Williams–Brice Stadium was renamed in Suggs's honor, becoming the "Tommy Suggs 2001 Gamecock Football Entrance".

== Personal life ==
Suggs is married and has two children and one grandchild. Both he and his wife have been active in philanthropy work and fundraising efforts for the university, and Suggs has served as the chair of the University of South Carolina's Development Foundation. Aside from his work with the university, Suggs has also been involved with numerous civic groups, including the South Carolina Nature Conservancy and the Greater Columbia Chamber of Commerce, serving as the president of the latter. He has also served as the president of the South Carolina Athletic Hall of Fame. In addition to his BS and honorary doctorate degrees from the Darla Moore School of Business, Suggs has also graduated from the School of Banking of the South at Louisiana State University, the National Commercial Lending Graduate School at the University of Oklahoma, and the Wharton School's Executive Education program at the University of Pennsylvania.

=== Other work ===
As a businessman, Suggs has been involved in the banking industry in South Carolina since the early 1970s, serving in executive positions at numerous banking companies, including South Carolina Federal Savings Bank, South Carolina National Bank, and First Bank of the Midlands. In 1996, he purchased KeenanSuggs, an insurance company that operated in the Carolinas. In 2016, this company was purchased by HUB International. Since then, he has served as the president and chief executive officer of HUB's Carolinas region.

== See also ==
- South Carolina Gamecocks football statistical leaders
