= 2010 Chick-fil-A Bowl =

American college football game

- 43rd Peach Bowl
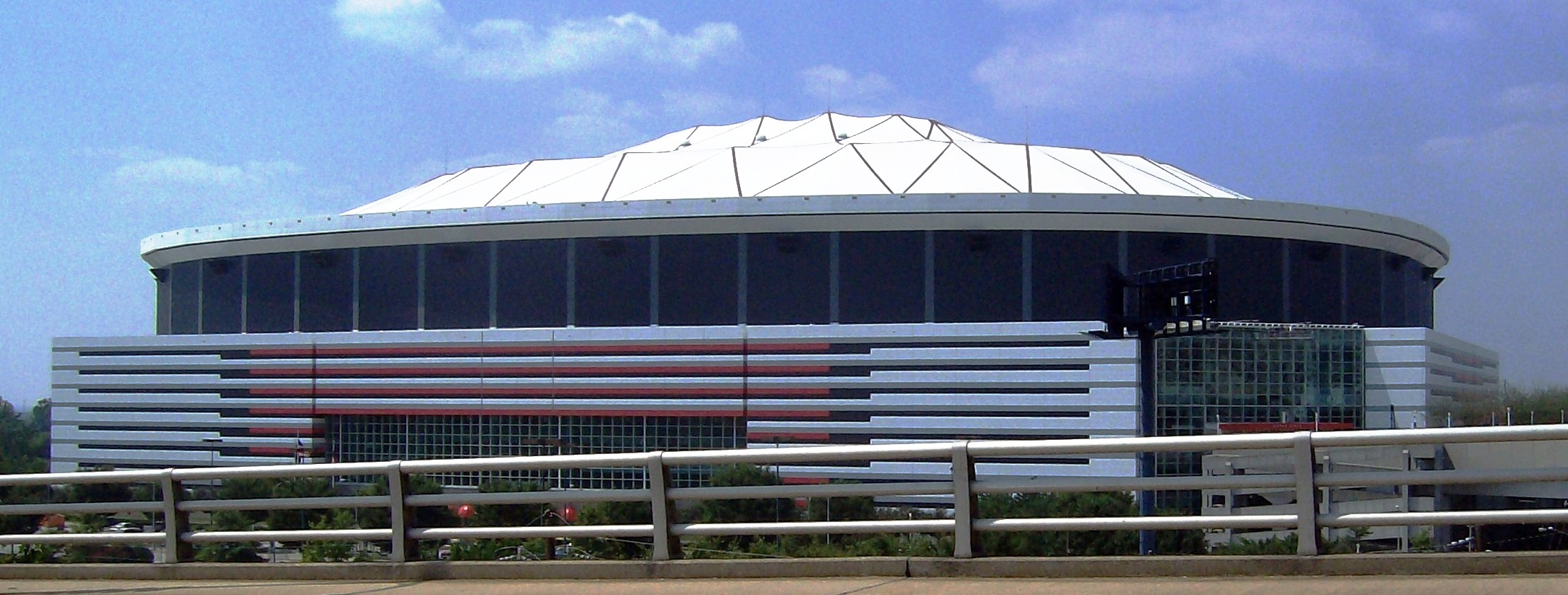
- The Georgia Dome in Atlanta, Georgia, hosted the Chick-fil-A Bowl.
South Carolina Gamecocks	Florida State Seminoles
(9–4)	(9–4)
SEC	ACC
17	26
Head coach: Steve Spurrier	Head coach: Jimbo Fisher
AP / Coaches / BCS; 19 / 20 / 20	AP / Coaches / BCS; 23 / 23 / 23
	1	2	3	4	Total
South Carolina	0	3	7	7	17
Florida State	6	7	6	7	26
- Date: December 31, 2010
- Season: 2010
- Stadium: Georgia Dome
- Location: Atlanta, Georgia
- Favorite: South Carolina by 3
- Referee: Tom Tomczyk (Big East)
- Attendance: 72,217
- Payout: US$3.35 million

United States TV coverage
- Network: ESPN
- Announcers: Ron Franklin, Ed Cunningham and Jeannine Edwards
- Nielsen ratings: 5.0

The 2010 Chick-fil-A Bowl was a college football bowl game played at the Georgia Dome in Atlanta, Georgia, on December 31, 2010, with kickoff at 7:30 p.m. EST. With sponsorship from Chick-fil-A, it was the 43rd edition of the game known throughout most of its history as the Peach Bowl. The game featured the No. 19 South Carolina Gamecocks versus the No. 23 Florida State Seminoles.

== Teams ==
=== South Carolina ===
The SEC Eastern Division Champion South Carolina Gamecocks appeared in the Chick-fil-A Bowl. The Gamecocks also entered the game with an impressive 9–4 record after a 7–6 season in 2009. South Carolina has some of the finest young talent in the SEC in freshman running back Marcus Lattimore and sophomore receiver Alshon Jeffery. They also made their first appearance in the Chick-fil-A Bowl, although they do have one Peach Bowl appearance: a 14–3 loss to West Virginia in 1969.

=== Florida State ===
The ACC Atlantic Division Champion Florida State Seminoles came into the game with a 9–4 record in coach Jimbo Fisher's first season. The strength of the Seminoles this season has been their defense, which ranks No. 2 in the nation in sacks and No. 17 in tackles for loss. Florida State's appearance in the Chick-fil-A Bowl marks a continuance of their streak of active consecutive bowl games to twenty nine. Although FSU has never appeared in the Chick-fil-A Bowl under its current name, it has appeared in two games when it was known as the Peach Bowl, losing the inaugural game in 1968 and winning it in 1983.

Like South Carolina, Florida State has been a member of its current conference since 1992.

== Game summary ==
=== Scoring summary ===
Scoring play	Score
1st quarter
FSU - D. Hopkins 29-yard field goal, 8:08	FSU 3 - 0
FSU - Hopkins 48-yard field goal, 02:42	FSU 6 - 0
2nd quarter
FSU - C. Thompson 27-yd run (Hopkins kick), 01:02	FSU 13–0
SC - Spencer Lanning 40-yd field goal, 00:00	FSU 13–3
3rd quarter
FSU - Hopkins 35-yd field goal, 10:38	FSU 16–3
SC - Stephen Garcia 3-yd pass from Ace Sanders (Lanning kick), 03:49	FSU 16–10
FSU - Hopkins 45-yd field goal, 00:09	FSU 19–10
4th quarter
SC - Brian Maddox 7-yd run (Spencer Lanning kick), 11:56	FSU 19–17
FSU - T. Easterling 7-yard pass from Manuel, E. J. (Hopkins kick), 05:27	FSU 26-17

=== Statistics ===
Statistics	SC	FSU
First downs	22	18
Total offense, plays - yards	414	308
Rushes-yards (net)	32-139	45-218
Passing yards (net)	275	90
Passes, Comp-Att-Int	36-21-3	21-12-1
Time of Possession	26:32	33:28

== Game Notes ==
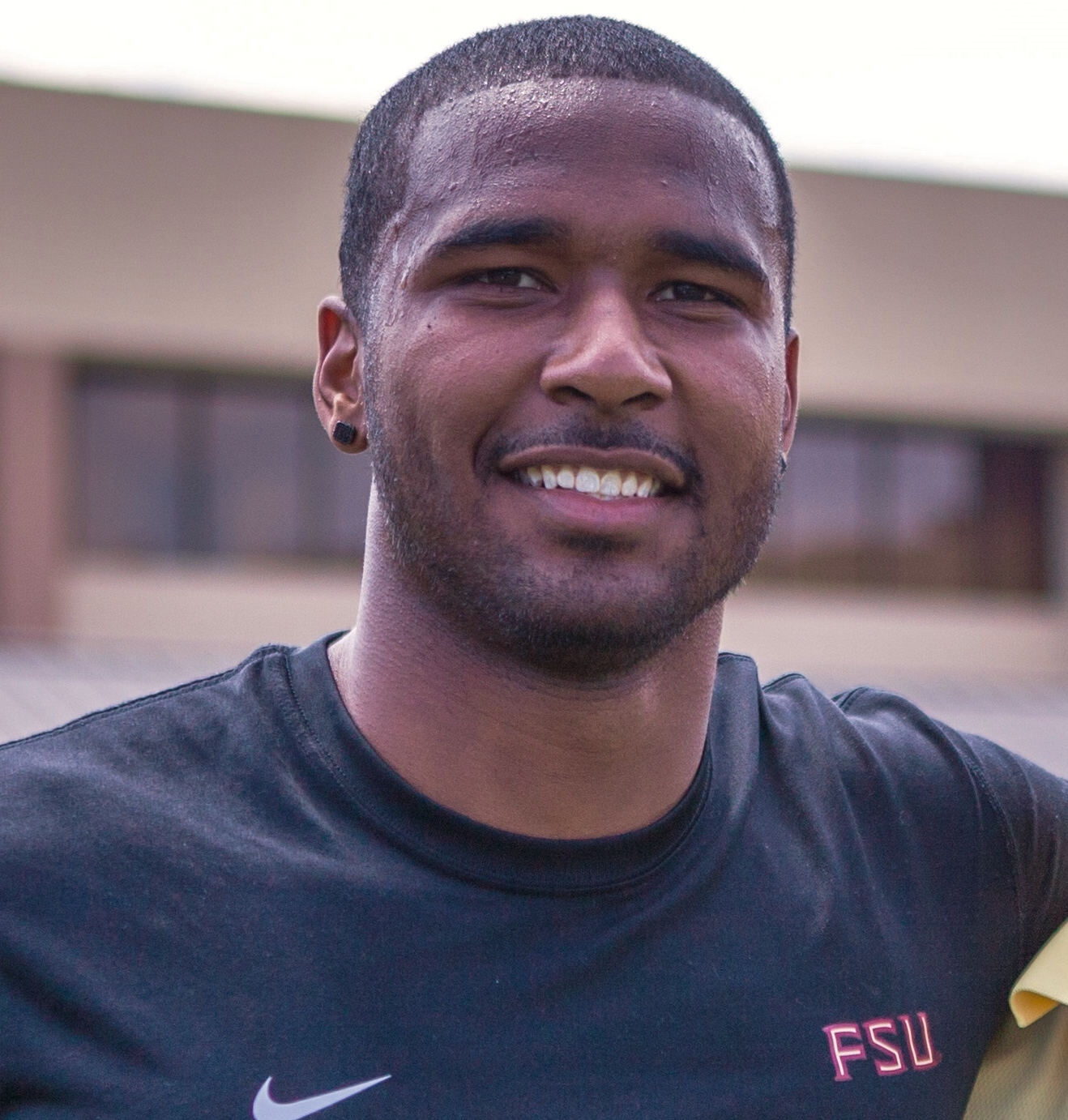
Manuel with Florida State University

Florida State QB Christian Ponder had left the game in the second quarter with a concussion, E.J Manuel had taken over the Florida State offense. E.J completed 11 to 15 passes for 84 yards and a touchdown and had seven carries for 46 yards. He was 7-for-7 passing on the fourth-quarter touchdown drive led the Seminoles to 26–17 win. After the game Florida State Coach Jimbo Fisher said "I hate it for Christian, he got dinged on the back of his head. He came off and he was kind of out of it a little bit. I hate that because of what he means to us but EJ, oh boy, I'm glad he's on our team." "E.J. is special."

The two schools had met 18 prior times with Florida State holding a commanding 15–3 advantage in the series. The last meeting was a 38-10 FSU victory in 1991. This was the first time the programs had met in a bowl game.
