= 2010 South Carolina Gamecocks football team =

American college football season

2010 South Carolina Gamecocks football

SEC East Division champion

SEC Championship Game, L 17–56 vs. Auburn

Chick-fil-A Bowl, L 17–26 vs. Florida State
- Conference: Southeastern Conference
- Eastern Division

Ranking
- Coaches: No. 22
- AP: No. 22
- Record: 9–5 (5–3 SEC)
- Head coach: Steve Spurrier (6th season)
- Offensive scheme: Fun and gun
- Defensive coordinator: Ellis Johnson (3rd season)
- Base defense: 4–2–5
- Home stadium: Williams-Brice Stadium

2010 Southeastern Conference football standings
| | Conf. | | | Overall |
| Team | W | | L | W | | L |
|---|---|---|---|---|---|---|
Eastern Division
| No. 22 South Carolina x | 5 | – | 3 | 9 | – | 5 |
| Florida | 4 | – | 4 | 8 | – | 5 |
| Georgia | 3 | – | 5 | 6 | – | 7 |
| Tennessee | 3 | – | 5 | 6 | – | 7 |
| Kentucky | 2 | – | 6 | 6 | – | 7 |
| Vanderbilt | 1 | – | 7 | 2 | – | 10 |
Western Division
| No. 1 Auburn x$# | 8 | – | 0 | 14 | – | 0 |
| No. 12 Arkansas % | 6 | – | 2 | 10 | – | 3 |
| No. 8 LSU | 6 | – | 2 | 11 | – | 2 |
| No. 10 Alabama | 5 | – | 3 | 10 | – | 3 |
| No. 15 Mississippi State | 4 | – | 4 | 9 | – | 4 |
| Ole Miss* | 1 | – | 7 | 4 | – | 8 |
Championship: Auburn 56, South Carolina 17
# – BCS National Champion; $ – BCS representative as conference champion; % – BCS at-large representative; x – Division champion/co-champions; * Ole Miss vacated all wins due to NCAA violations.; Rankings from AP Poll

The 2010 South Carolina Gamecocks football team represented the University of South Carolina in the 2010 NCAA Division I FBS football season. The team's head coach was Steve Spurrier, who was in his sixth season at USC. The Gamecocks played their home games at Williams–Brice Stadium in Columbia, South Carolina and were members of the East Division of the Southeastern Conference. The Gamecocks finished the season 9–5, 5–3 in SEC play to win the East Division for the first and only time in program history.

The division championship was made possible by a relatively weakened SEC East (Note: The historic powerhouses of the SEC East until then (Florida, Tennessee, and Georgia) each had a down year in 2010. The 2010 season was the first in which a team other than Florida, Tennessee, and Georgia won the SEC East. South Carolina was the only Eastern team to win more than 50% of its conference games this season.) and several Gamecocks having successful seasons. Returning quarterback Stephen Garcia had another top-5 season for the school in many statistical categories. Wide receiver Alshon Jeffery had "one of the best SEC receiver seasons ever" as a finalist for the Biletnikoff Award and was a first team All-American. Running back Marcus Lattimore, in the only healthy season of his career, was named the National Freshman of the Year. The offense and defense were both statistically in the top half of the SEC.

Following the season-opening win, the Gamecocks entered the AP Top 25 and would not leave it again until September 2014. In the fourth home game, South Carolina upset defending national champion No. 1 Alabama, which was on a nineteen-game winning streak. This was the first and only victory over a top-ranked team in program history. One month later, South Carolina clinched the SEC East by defeating No. 24 Florida in the Swamp for the first time in program history. Spurrier was carried off the field by his players.

In the program's only appearance in the SEC Championship Game, the Gamecocks lost to No. 1 Auburn for the second time that season. Regardless, Spurrier was awarded his seventh and final SEC Coach of the Year Award. They were invited to the Chick-fil-A Bowl, where they were defeated by No. 23 Florida State. South Carolina finished the season ranked for the first time since 2001, and the nine-win season was only the third in program history.

== Preseason ==
On April 10, 2010, the White squad defeated the Garnet squad, 21–17, in the annual Garnet & Black Spring Game, in front of a crowd of 22,000.

== Schedule ==
The October 9 game against Alabama played host to ESPN's College GameDay, the program's 5th time hosting the popular ESPN show.

| Date | Time | Opponent | Rank | Site | TV | Result | Attendance |
|---|---|---|---|---|---|---|---|
| September 2 | 7:30 pm | Southern Miss* | | Williams–Brice Stadium; Columbia, SC | ESPN | W 41–13 | 70,438 |
| September 11 | 12:00 pm | No. 22 Georgia | No. 24 | Williams–Brice Stadium; Columbia, SC (rivalry) | ESPN2 | W 17–6 | 80,974 |
| September 18 | 7:00 pm | No. 24 (FCS) Furman* | No. 13 | Williams–Brice Stadium; Columbia, SC | ESPN3 | W 38–19 | 73,681 |
| September 25 | 7:45 pm | at No. 17 Auburn | No. 12 | Jordan–Hare Stadium; Auburn, AL | ESPN | L 27–35 | 87,451 |
| October 9 | 3:30 pm | No. 1 Alabama | No. 19 | Williams–Brice Stadium; Columbia, SC (College GameDay) | CBS | W 35–21 | 82,993 |
| October 16 | 6:00 pm | at Kentucky | No. 10 | Commonwealth Stadium; Lexington, KY | ESPN2 | L 28–31 | 67,955 |
| October 23 | 7:00 pm | at Vanderbilt | No. 19 | Vanderbilt Stadium; Nashville, TN | SECRN | W 21–7 | 33,425 |
| October 30 | 12:21 pm | Tennessee | No. 17 | Williams–Brice Stadium; Columbia, SC (rivalry) | SECN | W 38–24 | 79,336 |
| November 6 | 7:00 pm | No. 17 Arkansas | No. 18 | Williams–Brice Stadium; Columbia, SC | ESPN | L 20–41 | 75,136 |
| November 13 | 7:15 pm | at No. 24 Florida | No. 22 | Ben Hill Griffin Stadium; Gainesville, FL | ESPN | W 36–14 | 90,885 |
| November 20 | 12:21 pm | Troy* | No. 17 | Williams–Brice Stadium; Columbia, SC | SECN | W 69–24 | 74,117 |
| November 27 | 7:00 pm | at Clemson* | No. 18 | Memorial Stadium; Clemson, SC (rivalry) | ESPN2 | W 29–7 | 81,355 |
| December 4 | 4:00 pm | vs. No. 2 Auburn | No. 18 | Georgia Dome; Atlanta, GA (SEC Championship Game) | CBS | L 17–56 | 75,802 |
| December 31 | 7:30 pm | vs. No. 23 Florida State* | No. 19 | Georgia Dome; Atlanta, GA (Chick-fil-A Bowl) | ESPN | L 17–26 | 72,217 |
*Non-conference game; Rankings from AP Poll released prior to the game; All times are in Eastern time

== Game summaries ==
=== Southern Miss ===
| | 1 | 2 | 3 | 4 | Total |
|---|---|---|---|---|---|
| Golden Eagles | 3 | 3 | 0 | 7 | 13 |
| Gamecocks | 7 | 17 | 10 | 7 | 41 |

Quarterback Stephen Garcia and freshman running back Marcus Lattimore each rushed for two touchdowns and USC head coach Steve Spurrier won his 18th straight season opener, 41-13 over Southern Miss. Sophomore wide receiver Alshon Jeffery also had 106 receiving yards and freshman wide receiver Ace Sanders had a 53-yard run off of a reverse. Freshman backup quarterback Connor Shaw also had a highlight, throwing his first touchdown pass as a Gamecock to wide receiver D.L. Moore.

=== Georgia ===
| | 1 | 2 | 3 | 4 | Total |
|---|---|---|---|---|---|
| #22 Bulldogs | 3 | 0 | 3 | 0 | 6 |
| #24 Gamecocks | 7 | 7 | 0 | 3 | 17 |

Freshman running back Marcus Lattimore carried for 182 yards and two touchdowns, as #24 South Carolina outmatched #22 Georgia, 17-6, in the SEC opener for both teams. Quarterback Stephen Garcia was 12-17 for 165 yards, with seven of his passes caught by wide receiver Alshon Jeffery, who finished with 103 yards. Lattimore had 103 yards rushing in the first half, and USC held a 228-73 edge in total yards after the first two quarters. Georgia's 6 points were the fewest allowed by Carolina to a Bulldog team since a 2-0 USC victory in 1904, and the Gamecock defense held the Bulldogs to 61 rushing yards. Head Coach Steve Spurrier won his 106th SEC game, tying him for second all-time in the conference with former Ole Miss coach Johnny Vaught.

=== Furman ===
| | 1 | 2 | 3 | 4 | Total |
|---|---|---|---|---|---|
| Paladins | 0 | 6 | 7 | 6 | 19 |
| #13 Gamecocks | 14 | 7 | 10 | 7 | 38 |

Stephen Garcia went 13-20 for 150 yards with two touchdown passes, and Marcus Lattimore had 19 carries for 97 yards and a touchdown to lead the #13 Gamecocks to a 38-19 win over Furman. Cornerback Stephon Gilmore sealed the game with an 80-yard interception return for touchdown in the 4th quarter.

=== Auburn ===
| | 1 | 2 | 3 | 4 | Total |
|---|---|---|---|---|---|
| #12 Gamecocks | 14 | 6 | 7 | 0 | 27 |
| #17 Tigers | 7 | 7 | 7 | 14 | 35 |

=== Alabama ===
| | 1 | 2 | 3 | 4 | Total |
|---|---|---|---|---|---|
| #1 Crimson Tide | 3 | 6 | 5 | 7 | 21 |
| #19 Gamecocks | 14 | 7 | 7 | 7 | 35 |

USC toppled Alabama at home to notch their first defeat of a top-ranked team in school history.

=== Kentucky ===
| | 1 | 2 | 3 | 4 | Total |
|---|---|---|---|---|---|
| #10 Gamecocks | 14 | 14 | 0 | 0 | 28 |
| Wildcats | 0 | 10 | 7 | 14 | 31 |

=== Vanderbilt ===
| | 1 | 2 | 3 | 4 | Total |
|---|---|---|---|---|---|
| #19 Gamecocks | 0 | 7 | 7 | 7 | 21 |
| Commodores | 0 | 7 | 0 | 0 | 7 |

=== Tennessee ===
| | 1 | 2 | 3 | 4 | Total |
|---|---|---|---|---|---|
| Volunteers | 3 | 7 | 7 | 7 | 24 |
| #17 Gamecocks | 0 | 10 | 14 | 14 | 38 |

=== Arkansas ===
| | 1 | 2 | 3 | 4 | Total |
|---|---|---|---|---|---|
| #17 Razorbacks | 7 | 17 | 10 | 7 | 41 |
| #18 Gamecocks | 7 | 3 | 0 | 10 | 20 |

=== Florida ===
| | 1 | 2 | 3 | 4 | Total |
|---|---|---|---|---|---|
| #22 Gamecocks | 9 | 6 | 7 | 14 | 36 |
| #24 Gators | 7 | 0 | 0 | 7 | 14 |

With the win, South Carolina clinched the SEC East and a spot in the SEC Championship for the first time in program history.

=== Troy ===
| | 1 | 2 | 3 | 4 | Total |
|---|---|---|---|---|---|
| Trojans | 0 | 7 | 10 | 7 | 24 |
| #17 Gamecocks | 28 | 28 | 3 | 10 | 69 |

=== at Clemson (rivalry) ===
Game Twelve– No. 18 South Carolina Gamecocks (8-3) at Clemson Tigers (6-5) – Game summary

| Quarter | 1 | 2 | 3 | 4 | Total |
|---|---|---|---|---|---|
| No. 18 South Carolina | 9 | 10 | 10 | 0 | 29 |
| Clemson | 7 | 0 | 0 | 0 | 7 |

at Memorial Stadium • Clemson, South Carolina

- Date: Saturday, November 27, 2010
- Game time: 7:00 p.m. EST
- Game weather: Temperature: • Wind: • Weather: Clear
- TV: ESPN

Game information

First quarter

- (13:10) CLEM – DeAndre Hopkins 45-yard pass from Kyle Parker (Chandler Catanzaro kick) (Drive: 4 plays, 74 yards, 1:50; Clemson 7-0)
- (9:18) SC – Spencer Lanning 46-yard field goal (Drive: 11 plays, 48 yards, 3:52; Clemson 7-3)
- (5:00) SC – Patrick DiMarco 5-yard pass from Stephen Garcia (Spencer Lanning kick BLOCKED) (Drive: 1 play, 5 yards, 0:05; South Carolina 9-7)

Second quarter

- (14:53) SC – Alshon Jeffery 37-yard pass from Stephen Garcia (Spencer Lanning kick) (Drive: 5 plays, 85 yards, 2:16; South Carolina 16-7)
- (8:22) SC – Spencer Lanning 25-yard field goal (Drive: 10 plays, 72 yards, 5:29; South Carolina 19-7)

Third quarter

- (10:17) SC – Antonio Allen 37-yard interception return (Spencer Lanning kick) (South Carolina 26-7)
- (1:15) SC – Spencer Lanning 37-yard field goal (Drive: 6 plays, 20 yards, 2:49; South Carolina 29-7)

Fourth quarter

- no scoring

| Statistics | SC | CLEM |
|---|---|---|
| First downs | 14 | 13 |
| Total yards | 66–322 | 62–251 |
| Rushing yards | 36–95 | 27–61 |
| Passing yards | 227 | 212 |
| Passing: Comp–Att–Int | 14–30–0 | 17–35–1 |
| Time of possession | 21:11 | 15:26 |

| Team | Category | Player | Statistics |
|---|---|---|---|
| South Carolina | Passing | Stephen Garcia | 14/30, 227 yards, 2 TD |
| South Carolina | Rushing | Marcus Lattimore | 23 carries, 48 yards |
| South Carolina | Receiving | Alshon Jeffery | 5 receptions, 141 yards, TD |
| Clemson | Passing | Kyle Parker | 7/17, 117 yards, TD, INT |
| Clemson | Rushing | Jamie Harper | 16 carries, 58 yards |
| Clemson | Receiving | DeAndre Hopkins | 7 receptions, 124 yards, TD |

=== 2010 SEC Championship vs. Auburn ===
| | 1 | 2 | 3 | 4 | Total |
|---|---|---|---|---|---|
| #2 Tigers | 21 | 7 | 14 | 14 | 56 |
| #18 Gamecocks | 7 | 7 | 0 | 3 | 17 |

=== 2010 Chick-fil-A Bowl vs. Florida State ===
| | 1 | 2 | 3 | 4 | Total |
|---|---|---|---|---|---|
| #19 Gamecocks | 0 | 3 | 7 | 7 | 17 |
| #23 Seminoles | 6 | 7 | 6 | 7 | 26 |

== Players ==
=== Depth chart ===
Projected starters and primary backups for SEC Championship Game versus Auburn on December 4, 2010.

Defense

FS
Akeem Auguste
DeVonte Holloman

| WLB | MLB | SLB |
|---|---|---|
| ⋅ | Josh Dickerson | ⋅ |
| Quin Smith | Rodney Paulk | ⋅ |

SS
D. J. Swearinger
DeVonte Holloman

CB
C.C. Whitlock
Marty Markett

| DE | DT | DT | DE |
|---|---|---|---|
| Cliff Matthews | Ladi Ajiboye | Travian Robertson | Devin Taylor |
| Melvin Ingram | Kenny Davis | Aldrick Fordham | Byron McKnight |

CB
Stephon Gilmore
Akeem Auguste

Offense

WR
Alshon Jeffery
D.L. Moore

| LT | LG | C | RG | RT |
|---|---|---|---|---|
| Kyle Nunn | Garrett Chisolm | T.J. Johnson | Rokevious Watkins | Hutch Eckerson |
| Jarriel King | Rokevious Watkins | Ronald Patrick | Terrence Campbell | Kyle Nunn |

TE
Patrick DiMarco
Justice Cunningham

WR
Tori Gurley
Ace Sanders

QB
Stephen Garcia
Connor Shaw

Key reserves
RB Kenny Miles
WR Jason Barnes
WR Lamar Scruggs
WR DeMario Bennett
WR DeAngelo Smith
DE Chaz Sutton
DT Byron Jerideau
TE Mike Triglia

RB
Marcus Lattimore
Brian Maddox

FB
Patrick DiMarco
Brian Maddox

Special teams
PK Spencer Lanning
P Spencer Lanning
KR Bryce Sherman
PR Ace Sanders
LS Charles Turner
H Seth Strickland

=== Awards ===
- Steve Spurrier - SEC Coach of the Year
- Stephen Garcia - Maxwell Award Watch List; Manning Award Watch List; Walter Camp National Offensive Player of the Week, 10/10/10; SEC Offensive Player of the Week, 10/11/10; Davey O'Brien National Quarterback of the Week, 10/11/10; Capital One Cup Impact Performance of the Week, 10/14/10
- Alshon Jeffery - Biletnikoff Award Finalist; Maxwell Award Watch List; Rivals.com National Player of the Week, 10/11/10; AFCA Coaches' All-America Team; AP & Coaches First-Team All-SEC; Walter Camp Second-Team All-American
- T.J. Johnson - SEC Offensive Lineman of the Week, 9/6/10
- Spencer Lanning - Lou Groza Award Watch List, Ray Guy Award Nominee; SEC Special Teams Player of the Week, 11/15/10; SEC Special Teams Player of the Week, 11/29/10
- Marcus Lattimore - Maxwell Award Watch List; SEC Offensive Player of the Week & SEC Freshman of the Week, 9/13/10; SEC Freshman of the Week, 11/1/10; SEC Offensive Player of the Week, 11/15/10; SEC Freshman of the Week, 11/22/10; AP & Coaches First-Team All-SEC; AP & Coaches SEC Freshman of the Year; Walter Camp Second-Team All-American
- Devin Taylor - SEC Defensive Lineman of the Week, 11/1/10; AP First-Team All-SEC; Coaches Second-Team All-SEC
- Garrett Chisolm - Campbell Trophy Semifinalist; Coaches Second-Team All-SEC
- Stephon Gilmore - Bednarik Award Watch List, Nagurski Trophy Watch List; Coaches First-Team All-SEC; AP Second-Team All-SEC
- Cliff Matthews - Hendricks Award Watch List, Nagurski Trophy Watch List, Lott Trophy Watch List; Coaches Second-Team All-SEC

=== 2010 recruiting class ===
College recruiting (2010)
| Name | Hometown | School | Height | Weight | 40^{‡} | Commit date |
|---|---|---|---|---|---|---|
| Javon Bell; DB | Jacksonville, FL | Ribault HS | 6 ft 0 in (1.83 m) | 170 lb (77 kg) | 4.5 | Feb 3, 2010 |
| Javon Bell; DB | Recruit ratings: Scout: Rivals: (73) | | | | | |
| A.J. Cann; OL | Bamberg, SC | Bamberg-Ehrhardt HS | 6 ft 3 in (1.91 m) | 260 lb (120 kg) | 5.1 | Jun 17, 2009 |
| A.J. Cann; OL | Recruit ratings: Scout: Rivals: (81) | | | | | |
| Patrick Fish; K | Lawndale, NC | Burns HS | 6 ft 1 in (1.85 m) | 175 lb (79 kg) | - | Oct 4, 2009 |
| Patrick Fish; K | Recruit ratings: Scout: Rivals: (-) | | | | | |
| Cody Gibson; OL | Tallahassee, FL | Lincoln HS | 6 ft 6 in (1.98 m) | 265 lb (120 kg) | 5.2 | Jul 7, 2009 |
| Cody Gibson; OL | Recruit ratings: Scout: Rivals: (77) | | | | | |
| Toquavius Gilchrist; LB | El Dorado, KS | Butler County CC | 6 ft 2 in (1.88 m) | 230 lb (100 kg) | 4.5 | Dec 15, 2009 |
| Toquavius Gilchrist; LB | Recruit ratings: Scout: Rivals: (-) | | | | | |
| Sharrod Golightly; DB | Decatur, GA | Southwest Dekalb HS | 5 ft 11 in (1.80 m) | 180 lb (82 kg) | 4.6 | Feb 1, 2010 |
| Sharrod Golightly; DB | Recruit ratings: Scout: Rivals: (74) | | | | | |
| Brandon Golson; LB | St. Matthews, SC | Calhoun County HS | 6 ft 2 in (1.88 m) | 210 lb (95 kg) | - | Jun 11, 2009 |
| Brandon Golson; LB | Recruit ratings: Scout: Rivals: (80) | | | | | |
| Victor Hampton; DB | Darlington, SC | Darlington HS | 5 ft 11 in (1.80 m) | 170 lb (77 kg) | 4.4 | Jan 9, 2010 |
| Victor Hampton; DB | Recruit ratings: Scout: Rivals: (78) | | | | | |
| Byron Jerideau; DT | Fort Scott, KS | Fort Scott CC | 6 ft 1 in (1.85 m) | 320 lb (150 kg) | 5.0 | Feb 1, 2010 |
| Byron Jerideau; DT | Recruit ratings: Scout: Rivals: (-) | | | | | |
| Nick Jones; WR | Duncan, SC | Byrnes HS | 5 ft 9 in (1.75 m) | 175 lb (79 kg) | 4.45 | Nov 22, 2009 |
| Nick Jones; WR | Recruit ratings: Scout: Rivals: (77) | | | | | |
| Marcus Lattimore; RB | Duncan, SC | Byrnes HS | 6 ft 0 in (1.83 m) | 215 lb (98 kg) | 4.5 | Feb 2, 2010 |
| Marcus Lattimore; RB | Recruit ratings: Scout: Rivals: (84) | | | | | |
| Du'Von Millsap; OL | Buford, GA | Buford HS | 6 ft 6 in (1.98 m) | 320 lb (150 kg) | 5.0 | Oct 27, 2009 |
| Du'Von Millsap; OL | Recruit ratings: Scout: Rivals: (76) | | | | | |
| Ronald Patrick; OL | Cocoa, FL | Cocoa HS | 6 ft 2 in (1.88 m) | 280 lb (130 kg) | - | Jun 21, 2009 |
| Ronald Patrick; OL | Recruit ratings: Scout: Rivals: (72) | | | | | |
| Kelcy Quarles; DT | Greenwood, SC | Greenwood HS | 6 ft 4 in (1.93 m) | 275 lb (125 kg) | 4.7 | Nov 24, 2008 |
| Kelcy Quarles; DT | Recruit ratings: Scout: Rivals: (81) | | | | | |
| Corey Robinson; OL | Havelock, NC | Havelock HS | 6 ft 7 in (2.01 m) | 295 lb (134 kg) | 5.1 | Jun 30, 2009 |
| Corey Robinson; OL | Recruit ratings: Scout: Rivals: (76) | | | | | |
| Ace Sanders; WR | Bradenton, FL | Manatee HS | 5 ft 9 in (1.75 m) | 165 lb (75 kg) | 4.4 | Jan 28, 2010 |
| Ace Sanders; WR | Recruit ratings: Scout: Rivals: (75) | | | | | |
| Cadarious Sanders; DB | LaGrange, GA | Troup County HS | 6 ft 1 in (1.85 m) | 185 lb (84 kg) | 4.6 | Jul 26, 2009 |
| Cadarious Sanders; DB | Recruit ratings: Scout: Rivals: (75) | | | | | |
| Connor Shaw; QB | Flowery Branch, GA | Flowery Branch HS | 6 ft 2 in (1.88 m) | 195 lb (88 kg) | 4.5 | Apr 11, 2009 |
| Connor Shaw; QB | Recruit ratings: Scout: Rivals: (78) | | | | | |
| Corey Simmons; DE | Norcross, GA | Greater Atlanta Christian School | 6 ft 4 in (1.93 m) | 230 lb (100 kg) | 5.1 | Jan 27, 2010 |
| Corey Simmons; DE | Recruit ratings: Scout: Rivals: (-) | | | | | |
| J.T. Surratt; DT | Winston-Salem, NC | Parkland HS | 6 ft 3 in (1.91 m) | 285 lb (129 kg) | - | Jun 18, 2009 |
| J.T. Surratt; DT | Recruit ratings: Scout: Rivals: (75) | | | | | |
| Dylan Thompson; QB | Boiling Springs, SC | Boiling Springs HS | 6 ft 3 in (1.91 m) | 205 lb (93 kg) | 4.6 | Jun 15, 2009 |
| Dylan Thompson; QB | Recruit ratings: Scout: Rivals: (74) | | | | | |
| Brison Williams; DB | Warner Robins, GA | Northside HS | 6 ft 0 in (1.83 m) | 180 lb (82 kg) | - | Jun 21, 2009 |
| Brison Williams; DB | Recruit ratings: Scout: Rivals: (74) | | | | | |
| Tramell Williams; OL | Jacksonville, FL | Robert E. Lee HS | 6 ft 3 in (1.91 m) | 280 lb (130 kg) | 4.9 | Jun 26, 2009 |
| Tramell Williams; OL | Recruit ratings: Scout: Rivals: (75) | | | | | |
Overall recruit ranking: Scout: 34 Rivals: 24 ESPN: 23
‡ Refers to 40-yard dash; Note: In many cases, Scout, Rivals, 247Sports, On3, and ESPN may conflict in their listings of height, weight and 40 time.; In these cases, the average was taken. ESPN grades are on a 100-point scale.; Sources: "South Carolina Signee List 2010". Rivals.; "Scout.com Football Recruiting: South Carolina". Scout.; "2010 Player Signees- South Carolina". ESPN.; "Scout.com Team Recruiting Rankings". Scout.; "2010 Team Ranking". Rivals.com.

== Rankings ==
Ranking movements Legend: ██ Increase in ranking ██ Decrease in ranking RV = Received votes
| | Week | | | | | | | | | | | | | | | |
| Poll | Pre | 1 | 2 | 3 | 4 | 5 | 6 | 7 | 8 | 9 | 10 | 11 | 12 | 13 | 14 | Final |
|---|---|---|---|---|---|---|---|---|---|---|---|---|---|---|---|---|
| AP | RV | 24 | 13 | 12 | 20 | 19 | 10 | 19 | 17 | 18 | 22 | 17 | 18 | 18 | 19 | 22 |
| Coaches | RV | 25 | 16 | 15 | 22 | 20 | 12 | 20 | 17 | 17 | 22 | 17 | 17 | 16 | 20 | 22 |
| Harris | Not released | | | | | | 11 | 21 | 19 | 19 | 22 | 17 | 17 | 17 | 20 | Not released |
| BCS | Not released | | | | | | | 21 | 20 | 19 | 23 | 17 | 18 | 19 | 20 | Not released |

== Coaching staff ==
- Steve Spurrier - Head Coach
- Ellis Johnson - Assistant Head Coach & Defense Assistant Coach
- Lorenzo Ward - Defensive Coordinator & Safeties
- Shane Beamer - Cornerbacks/Special Teams & Recruiting Coordinator
- Shawn Elliott - Offensive Line/Running Game Coordinator
- Craig Fitzgerald - Strength & Conditioning
- Jay Graham - Running Backs
- Johnson Hunter - Tight Ends
- Brad Lawing - Defensive Line
- G. A. Mangus - Quarterbacks
- Steve Spurrier, Jr. - Wide Receivers
