= Cam Newton (disambiguation) =

Cam Newton (born 1989) is an American football quarterback.

Cam Newton may also refer to:

- Cam Newton (ice hockey) (born 1950), Pittsburgh Penguins goaltender
- Cam Newton (safety) (born 1982), defensive back at Furman and several pro teams
