= Blake Mitchell (disambiguation) =

Blake Mitchell (born 1984) is an American former college football player.

Blake Mitchell may also refer to:

- Blake Mitchell (baseball) (born 2004), American baseball player
- Lane Rogers (1994–2025), American gay pornographic actor, known by his alias Blake Mitchell
