= Syvelle Newton =

American football player (born 1985)

Profile
- Positions: Wide receiver, defensive back, quarterback

Personal information
- Born: April 15, 1985 (age 41); Marlboro County, South Carolina, U.S.
- Listed height: 6 ft 1 in (1.85 m)
- Listed weight: 210 lb (95 kg)

Career information
- High school: Bennettsville (SC)
- College: South Carolina (2003–2006)
- NFL draft: 2007: undrafted

Career history
- Georgia Force (2008)*; Harrisburg Stampede (2009–2010); Chicago Rush (2010); Philadelphia Soul (2011); Kansas City Command (2012); Georgia Force (2012); New Orleans VooDoo (2012); Georgia Force (2012)
- * Offseason or practice squad member only
- Stats at ArenaFan.com

Syvelle R. Newton (born April 15, 1985) is an American former football wide receiver, defensive back, and quarterback. He played college football for the University of South Carolina.

== College career ==
In 2006, Newton took over the starting quarterback position after Blake Mitchell was sidelined after a shutout loss to the University of Georgia. But after an ineffective start against the Arkansas Razorbacks later in the season, Newton lost the starting position. He is known for playing multiple positions, including wide receiver, running back, safety and quarterback. The Gamecocks finished the 2006 season 8–5 and defeated Houston in the Autozone Liberty Bowl 44 to 36 on December 29, 2006. Newton is one of four players in college football history with more than 600 yards rushing, passing and receiving in his career. Newton played in the East–West Shrine Game in 2007.

== Professional career ==
Newton was rated the 37th best wide receiver in the 2007 NFL draft by NFLDraftScout.com. The website also projected that he would be drafted in the seventh round or be a free agent signing. Some scouts thought that Newton was the "best athlete among offensive players eligible for the 2007 NFL Draft".

Pre-draft measurables
Height	Weight	40-yard dash	10-yard split	20-yard split	20-yard shuttle	Three-cone drill	Bench press
6 ft 1 in (1.85 m)	218 lb (99 kg)	4.70 s	1.64 s	2.70 s	4.47 s	7.44 s	20 reps
20‑ss/3‑cone from South Carolina Pro Day, all others from NFL Combine

He signed a two-year contract with the Montreal Alouettes of the Canadian Football League, however Newton left the Alouettes’ training camp shortly after being switched again from quarterback to receiver.

Newton was signed to the Harrisburg Stampede to play quarterback in 2009.

Newton joined the Chicago Rush in the second half of the 2010 Arena Football League season. Despite only being on the team for five games, he finished fourth on the team in receiving, with 41 catches for 566 yards and 12 touchdowns.

He was then signed to the Philadelphia Soul in 2010 to play in their 2011 season.

== Personal ==
Newton's brother, Cam, also played football. Syvelle coached at Brookland-Cayce High School for a short time.
