= 1995 Carquest Bowl (January) =

American college football game

West Virginia Mountaineers	South Carolina Gamecocks
(7–5)	(6–5)
Big East	SEC
21	24
Head coach: Don Nehlen	Head coach: Brad Scott
	1	2	3	4	Total
West Virginia	0	7	14	0	21
South Carolina	7	10	7	0	24
- Date: January 2, 1995
- Season: 1994
- Stadium: Joe Robbie Stadium
- Location: Miami Gardens, Florida
- MVP: QB Steve Taneyhill (South Carolina)
- Referee: Robin Wood (ACC)
- Attendance: 50,833

United States TV coverage
- Network: CBS
- Announcers: Verne Lundquist, Dan Fouts & Michele Tafoya

The 1995 Carquest Bowl (January) was a college football bowl game between the South Carolina Gamecocks and the West Virginia Mountaineers.

== Background ==
The Gamecocks finished third in the East Division of the Southeastern Conference while the Mountaineers finished tied for third in the Big East Conference. In 102 years of play, the Gamecocks had been to eight bowl games, but lost all of them. This was their ninth bowl game and first Carquest Bowl. The Mountaineers were in their second straight bowl game, though they had lost four straight bowl games.

== Game summary ==
Steve Taneyhill gave the Gamecocks an early lead with his touchdown pass to Boomer Foster with 12:34 remaining in the first quarter. Reed Morton increased the lead to 10 on a 47-yard field goal, the longest in Carquest Bowl and Gamecock bowl history. Robert Walker narrowed the lead on his touchdown run of 24 yards. Tanneyhill ran in for a four-yard touchdown to make it 17–7 at halftime. Lovett Purnell caught a touchdown pass from Chad Johnston to make it 17–14 in the third quarter. Stanley Pritchet ran in for a touchdown to make it 24–14. Purnell caught another touchdown from Johnston to make it 24–21 as the quarter soon ended. West Virginia was driving for points when they failed to convert on fourth down with 3:52 left. Pritchett was going for his second touchdown run when he broke free, but Aaron Beasley stripped him of the ball, and the Mountaineers recovered at their own 3 with 1:14 remaining. But they threw two incompletions and were sacked as the Gamecocks held on to win. South Carolina had won their first ever bowl game while West Virginia now had lost five straight.

Taneyhill went 26-of-36 for 227 yards and 1 touchdown. Johnston went 19-of-32 for 240 yards with 2 touchdowns and 1 interception.

== Aftermath ==
The Gamecocks waited six years until their next bowl game, this time with a different coach. The Mountaineers returned to the Carquest Bowl two years later.

This was the last edition of the Carquest Bowl to be televised by CBS. After the organizers of the Orange Bowl announced plans to move their game to Joe Robbie Stadium, the bowl lost its New Year’s Day slot; CBS decided not to renew its contract to air the game, which moved to TBS for its next playing.

== Statistics ==
Statistics	South Carolina	West Virginia
First downs	21	16
Yards rushing	148	150
Yards passing	227	240
Total yards	375	390
Punts-Average	4-35.2	2-54.0
Fumbles-Lost	6-2	3-2
Interceptions	0	1
Penalties-Yards	6-38	7-55
