= Anthony Wright (American football) =

American football player (born 1976)

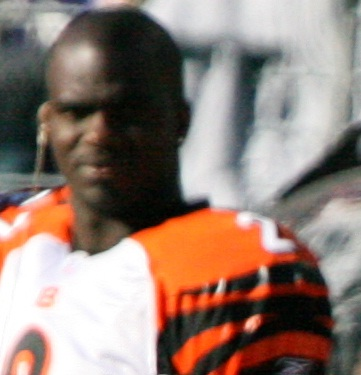
- Wright with the Cincinnati Bengals in 2006

No. 2
- Position: Quarterback

Personal information
- Born: February 14, 1976 (age 50); Vanceboro, North Carolina, U.S.
- Listed height: 6 ft 1 in (1.85 m)
- Listed weight: 211 lb (96 kg)

Career information
- High school: West Craven (Vanceboro)
- College: South Carolina (1994–1998)
- NFL draft: 1999: undrafted

Career history
- Pittsburgh Steelers (1999); Dallas Cowboys (2000–2001); Baltimore Ravens (2002–2005); Cincinnati Bengals (2006); New York Giants (2007–2008)

Awards and highlights
- Super Bowl champion (XLII)

Career NFL statistics
- Passing attempts: 605
- Passing completions: 332
- Completion percentage: 54.9%
- TD–INT: 20–25
- Passing yards: 3,590
- Passer rating: 66.3
- Stats at Pro Football Reference

Anthony Lavon Wright (born February 14, 1976) is an American former professional football player who was a quarterback in the National Football League (NFL) for the Pittsburgh Steelers, Dallas Cowboys, Baltimore Ravens, Cincinnati Bengals, and New York Giants. He played college football for the South Carolina Gamecocks.

== Early life ==
Wright attended West Craven High School, where he played as a quarterback. As a senior, he was named All-state, SuperPrep All-American and Gatorade Player-of-the-Year. He finished his high school career with 4,890 passing yards, 44 touchdowns and 15 interceptions.

== College career ==
Wright accepted a football scholarship from the University of South Carolina. As a redshirt freshman, he was a backup behind Steve Taneyhill, making 17 out of 27 completions for 207 yards, 2 touchdowns and one interception. As a sophomore, he became a starter after Taneyhill graduated, posting 1,850 passing yards, 8 passing touchdowns, 3 interceptions, 90 rushing yards and 3 rushing touchdowns.

As a junior, he suffered a torn anterior cruciate ligament in his right knee against the University of Tennessee, missing the final two games of the season. He had 1,685 passing yards, a school record 18 passing touchdowns, 5 interceptions, 44 rushing yards and one rushing touchdown.

As a senior, head coach Brad Scott platooned him with freshman Phil Petty, but still recorded 1,899 passing yards, 10 passing touchdowns, 10 interceptions, 56 rushing yards and 3 rushing touchdowns. He left as the school's fifth all-time passer, leading the school to a 12–21 record over the three years he was the starter, including one winning campaign and a 1–10 record in his last season.

== Professional career ==
=== Pittsburgh Steelers ===
Wright was signed as an undrafted free agent by the Pittsburgh Steelers after the 1999 NFL draft. He made such a good impression in preseason that the team made the unusual move keeping him as the fourth-string quarterback, behind Kordell Stewart, Mike Tomczak, and Pete Gonzalez. On August 27, 2000, he was waived after being passed on the depth chart by rookie Tee Martin.

=== Dallas Cowboys ===
On August 30, 2000, Wright was signed by the Dallas Cowboys to their practice squad. Even though he hadn't played in an NFL regular season game, he was scouted in a preseason game between the Cowboys and the Steelers.

In November, he was promoted to the active roster after backup quarterback Randall Cunningham was injured. On December 10, when Troy Aikman suffered a concussion playing against the Washington Redskins, Wright played the remaining three quarters in a 32–13 win. Although he had attempted only 5 passes (3 completions) in the previous game, he was given the start in the next game against the New York Giants, which resulted in a 17–13 loss. He would also start the final game of the season against the Tennessee Titans, which resulted in a 31–0 loss after he had three critical turnovers in the third quarter.

In 2001, he became the backup quarterback after Tony Banks was cut. When starter Quincy Carter injured his throwing thumb, Wright became his replacement and started on September 23 against the San Diego Chargers, but had two costly turnovers in a 21–32 loss. The next week he started in an 18–40 loss against the Philadelphia Eagles, in which he was ineffective. On October 7, he replaced an injured Carter but the team still lost 21–28 against the Oakland Raiders. The next week he started on Monday Night Football and contributed to a 9–7 win against Tony Banks and the Washington Redskins. Having a chronic right knee injury, he decided to have his knee scoped to repair the cartilage damage, forcing him to sit the rest of the season. The Cowboys would use a combination of Clint Stoerner and Ryan Leaf as the starters until Carter recovered from a torn hamstring, starting a franchise-high four quarterbacks in a season.

Head coach Dave Campo released Wright from the team on September 1, 2002, following the acquisition of quarterback Chad Hutchinson during the offseason, while stating that Stoerner was better suited for the third-string quarterback role, in light of Wright's ambition to be a starter.

=== Baltimore Ravens ===
Wright was signed by the Baltimore Ravens to their practice squad in 2002. He was activated from the practice squad on October 15. In the 2003 season, the team’s first-round draft pick, quarterback Kyle Boller, injured his thigh in a game against the St. Louis Rams on November 9 (Week 10). This gave way to an opportunity for Wright to start games.

Wright’s first start was in Week 11 against the Miami Dolphins. His performance was unremarkable, and the Ravens lost 9-6 (OT). In the following week, however, Wright led a spectacular comeback against the Seahawks. With the score tied at three in the final minute of the first half, the Seahawks scored two quick touchdowns, and stormed to a 41–24 lead with seven minutes remaining, but Wright erupted with four touchdown throws to Marcus Robinson and 319 passing yards in a 44–41 overtime triumph. Ravens head coach Brian Billick gave the game ball to Wright's wife, for waiting until after the contest to induce labor.

The Ravens won five of their last six games with Wright posting a 5–2 record and having a critical role in the team reaching the playoffs, where they lost a close game against the Tennessee Titans with a score of 20–17, with the difference being a 46-yard field goal with 29 seconds left. He finished the season with 1,199 passing yards, 9 touchdowns and 8 interceptions.

Wright missed the 2004 season after having surgery to repair a torn labrum in his right shoulder. Following another injury to Boller during the first game of the 2005 season, he was named the starting quarterback but was again demoted after having a 2–5 record.

=== Cincinnati Bengals ===
With the departure of Carson Palmer's former backup quarterback Jon Kitna to the Detroit Lions, Wright signed a one-year deal with the Cincinnati Bengals on April 21, 2006, winning a competition with Craig Krenzel and Doug Johnson for the backup job.

=== New York Giants ===
On April 13, 2007, he signed as a free agent with the New York Giants, throwing him into a four-quarterback scramble for roster spots with Eli Manning, Tim Hasselbeck, and Jared Lorenzen. He was named the third-string quarterback in a season that saw the team win Super Bowl XLII, beating the previously undefeated New England Patriots.

On August 18, 2008, Wright suffered a back injury in a preseason game against the Cleveland Browns and was eventually placed on the injured reserve list on August 30. He wasn't re-signed the next season and decided to announce his retirement.

== Career statistics ==
=== NFL ===
Year	Team	Games		Passing				
Year	Team	GP	GS	Cmp	Att	Yds	TD	Int
1999	PIT	0	0	0	0	0	0	0
2000	DAL	4	2	22	53	237	0	3
2001	DAL	4	3	48	98	529	5	5
2002	BAL	0	0	0	0	0	0	0
2003	BAL	7	7	94	178	1,199	9	8
2004	BAL	0	0	0	0	0	0	0
2005	BAL	9	7	164	266	1,582	6	9
2006	CIN	4	0	3	3	31	0	0
2007	NYG	3	0	1	7	12	0	0
2008	NYG	0	0	0	0	0	0	0
Career		31	19	332	605	3,590	20	25

=== College ===
Season	Team	Games		Passing					
Season	Team	GP	GS	Cmp	Att	Yds	TD	Int	Rtg
1996	South Carolina	11	11	131	244	1,850	8	6	123.3
1997	South Carolina	11	11	139	252	1,685	18	5	130.9
1998	South Carolina	11	11	145	273	1,899	10	10	116.3
Career		33	33	415	769	5,434	36	21	123.3

== Personal life ==
Wright has had two cousins play in the NFL, Jesse Campbell who played safety from 1991 to 1998, and Justin Hardy who played wide receiver from 2015 to 2021.

Wright was shot multiple times after an argument on July 1, 2019, in Concord, North Carolina. He underwent emergency surgery to treat his injuries.
