= Cam Newton (safety) =

American football player (born 1982)

No. 39
- Position: Safety

Personal information
- Born: May 19, 1982 (age 44); Darlington, South Carolina, U.S.
- Listed height: 6 ft 1 in (1.85 m)
- Listed weight: 203 lb (92 kg)

Career information
- High school: Marlboro County (Bennettsville, South Carolina)
- College: Furman
- NFL draft: 2005: undrafted

Career history
- Atlanta Falcons (2005–2006); Carolina Panthers (2006); Georgia Force (2008)

Career NFL statistics
- Tackles: 4
- Stats at Pro Football Reference
- Stats at ArenaFan.com

Cameron Lemark Newton (born May 19, 1982) is an American former professional football player who was a safety in the National Football League (NFL). He played college football for the Furman Paladins and was signed by the Atlanta Falcons as an undrafted free agent in 2005. Newton was also a member of the Carolina Panthers and Georgia Force.

== Early life ==
Born in Darlington, South Carolina, Newton attended Marlboro County High School in Bennettsville, South Carolina where he played football, starting at defensive back and quarterback. He was a starter on Marlboro's 1998 state championship team, as well as leading Marlboro to a 10–2 record and a playoff berth in 2000. In 2000, he scored 12 touchdowns on the ground and another 15 in the air. He was a first-team All-State selection and a Shrine Bowl selection. He also played basketball for one season at Marlboro.

== College career ==
Newton decided to attend Furman University, where he redshirted his freshman year. In 2001, he was a backup safety behind Josh Cooper, and finished the year with 22 tackles. In 2002, after Cooper's graduation, Newton was promoted to the starting safety job, from which he recorded 57 tackles, six interceptions, two fumble recoveries, and nine pass deflections. He had shoulder surgery during the offseason, and was held out of the 2003 spring training. During the 2003 season, Newton intercepted 10 passes and had a team-high 61 tackles, which earned him a unanimous All-Southern Conference selection as well as Furman University's Best Defensive Back Award. He missed three games in 2004 with an ankle injury, but ended the season with 63 tackles, four passes deflected and two fumbles recoveries. His 9 interceptions were good for 12th highest all-time in Furman University's history.

== Professional career ==
=== National Football League ===
After going undrafted in the 2005 NFL draft Newton signed with the Atlanta Falcons. He was promoted to the active roster on September 20 after cornerback Leigh Torrence was waived. He spent two seasons with the Falcons, during which he started nine games (six in 2005, three in 2006). He totaled four tackles on special teams (all solo). He was waived by the Falcons at the end of the 2006 NFL season after spending some time on their practice squad during the second half of the season. The Carolina Panthers then signed Newton on December 27, 2006, but he did not play in any games with them. He was released on September 1, 2007, as part of the final training camp cuts. He later had tryouts for the Denver Broncos and Tennessee Titans but was not signed.

=== Arena Football League ===
After sitting out the 2007 season with an Achilles injury, Newton signed with the Georgia Force of the Arena Football League on January 4, 2008. He was waived on February 22, signed to the team's practice squad on February 26 and promoted to the active roster on February 28, 2008. During the 2008 season, he totaled 50 solo tackles, 21 tackle assists, two fumbles recoveries, and four interceptions, three of which were returned for touchdowns.

== Personal life ==
Newton now works as a personal trainer. He holds the Cam Newton Football Fundamentals camp every summer in Bennetsville. Newton's brother, Syvelle, also played football.

After the Panthers drafted Cameron Jerrell Newton in the 2011 NFL draft, a quarterback from Auburn University, Cameron Lemark Newton has frequently been confused with the Auburn quarterback. Jerrell Newton remembers watching Lemark Newton play for the Falcons while he was attending high school in Atlanta, Georgia.
