= Blake Mitchell =

American football player (born 1984)

Lewis Blake Mitchell (born September 23, 1984) is a former college football quarterback for the South Carolina Gamecocks. He was previously on the roster of the South Carolina Force.

== Early life ==
Mitchell was born in 1984 to Francee and Alvin "Nugget" Mitchell. His brother Jay was drafted to the Colorado Rockies in 2001.

== High school years ==
Mitchell attended LaGrange High School in LaGrange, Georgia, where he was a letterman in football. As a junior, he led his team to a Class AAA State Championship and was a Class AAA All-State selection. He finished his senior season with 81 completions out of 133 pass attempts for 1,553 yards and 17 touchdowns and only three interceptions, and he was named as an EA Sports Elite 11 Quarterback. Rivals.com rated him as the 55th Best Prospect in the Nation. Mitchell graduated from LaGrange High School in 2003.

== College years ==
He led the Gamecocks to the Independence Bowl against the Missouri Tigers, and though South Carolina took a 21–0 lead, Missouri whistled back to win 38–31. On September 13, 2006, his junior year, Mitchell was suspended from playing after being arrested for punching a bouncer in the face at a bar in the Five Points area of Columbia, South Carolina. Mitchell returned to the team after the charges were dropped. That season, he led the Gamecocks to a victory over the University of Houston in the Liberty Bowl by a score of 44–36. He is one out of three quarterbacks in Gamecock history to defeat the Tennessee Volunteers, Florida Gators, Georgia Bulldogs, and the Clemson Tigers in a career, the others being Stephen Garcia and Connor Shaw.

== Later life ==
Mitchell was signed to the South Carolina Force of the American Indoor Football Association for the 2009 season.

In the late 2010s, Mitchell was working as a sales manager in Charleston, South Carolina.
