= 1995 South Carolina Gamecocks football team =

American college football season

1995 South Carolina Gamecocks football
- Conference: Southeastern Conference
- Eastern Division
- Record: 4–6–1 (2–5–1 SEC)
- Head coach: Brad Scott (2nd season)
- Offensive coordinator: John Eason (1st season)
- Defensive coordinator: Wally Burnham (2nd season)
- Home stadium: Williams–Brice Stadium

1995 Southeastern Conference football standings
	Conf.					Overall
Team	W		L		T	W		L		T
Eastern Division
No. 2 Florida x$	8	–	0	–	0	12	–	1	–	0
No. 3 Tennessee	7	–	1	–	0	11	–	1	–	0
Georgia	3	–	5	–	0	6	–	6	–	0
South Carolina	2	–	5	–	1	4	–	6	–	1
Kentucky	2	–	6	–	0	4	–	7	–	0
Vanderbilt	1	–	7	–	0	2	–	9	–	0
Western Division
Arkansas x	6	–	2	–	0	8	–	5	–	0
No. 21 Alabama	5	–	3	–	0	8	–	3	–	0
No. 22 Auburn	5	–	3	–	0	8	–	4	–	0
LSU	4	–	3	–	1	7	–	4	–	1
Ole Miss	3	–	5	–	0	6	–	5	–	0
Mississippi State	1	–	7	–	0	3	–	8	–	0
Championship: Florida 34, Arkansas 3
$ – Conference champion; x – Division champion/co-champions; Rankings from AP Poll

The 1995 South Carolina Gamecocks football team represented the University of South Carolina as a member of the Eastern Division of the Southeastern Conference (SEC) during the 1995 NCAA Division I-A football season. Led by second-year head coach Brad Scott, the Gamecocks compiled an overall record of 4–6–1 with a mark of 2–5–1 in conference play, placing fourth in the SEC's Eastern Division. The team played home games at Williams–Brice Stadium in Columbia, South Carolina.

In an otherwise unsuccessful season, the Gamecocks almost upset No. 14 LSU at home, leading with just over a minute left in the game. However, a late touchdown by the Tigers allowed them to tie the game. Due to overtime being permanently implemented in the 1996 NCAA Division I-A football season, this remains the last tie in Gamecock football history, and one of the last ties in college football history.

== Schedule ==
Date	Time	Opponent	Site	TV	Result	Attendance	Source
September 2	12:30 p.m.	at Georgia	Sanford Stadium; Athens, GA (rivalry)	JPS	L 23–42	86,117	
September 9	3:00 p.m.	at Arkansas	Razorback Stadium; Fayetteville, AR		L 21–51	46,821	
September 16	7:00 p.m.	Louisiana Tech*	Williams–Brice Stadium; Columbia, SC		W 68–21	70,411	
September 23	12:30 p.m.	Kentucky	Williams–Brice Stadium; Columbia, SC	JPS	L 30–35	65,325	
September 30	12:30 p.m.	No. 14 LSU	Williams–Brice Stadium; Columbia, SC	JPS	T 20–20	67,902	
October 7	1:00 p.m.	Kent State*	Williams–Brice Stadium; Columbia, SC		W 77–14	66,807	
October 14	7:00 p.m.	at Mississippi State	Scott Field; Starkville, MS	PPV	W 65–39	30,035	
October 21	1:00 p.m.	Vanderbilt	Williams–Brice Stadium; Columbia, SC		W 52–14	68,915	
October 28	12:30 p.m.	at No. 6 Tennessee	Neyland Stadium; Knoxville, TN (rivalry)	JPS	L 21–56	95,426	
November 11	8:00 p.m.	No. 3 Florida	Williams–Brice Stadium; Columbia, SC	ESPN	L 7–63	71,638	
November 18	12:30 p.m.	Clemson*	Williams–Brice Stadium; Columbia, SC (rivalry)	JPS	L 17–38	74,990	
*Non-conference game; Rankings from AP Poll released prior to the game; All times are in Eastern time

== Roster ==
1995 South Carolina Gamecocks football team roster
Players
Coaches
Offense

Pos.	#	Name	Class
RB	22	Duce Staley	Jr
WR		Jon-Eric Sullivan
QB	1	Anthony Wright	Fr

Defense

Pos.	#	Name	Class
DB	28	Chris Abrams	Jr
LB	52	Shane Burnham	So
DE	89	Maynard Caldwell	Jr
DB	5	Terry Cousin	Jr
LB	92	Ryan Koop
LB	45	James McDougald	So
LB	?	Chris Rumph

Special teams

Pos.	#	Name	Class
PK	14	Reed Morton	Jr

Head coach

- Brad Scott

Coordinators/assistant coaches

Legend

- (C) Team captain
- (S) Suspended
- (I) Ineligible
- Injured
- Redshirt
