= Tori Gurley =

American football player (born 1987)

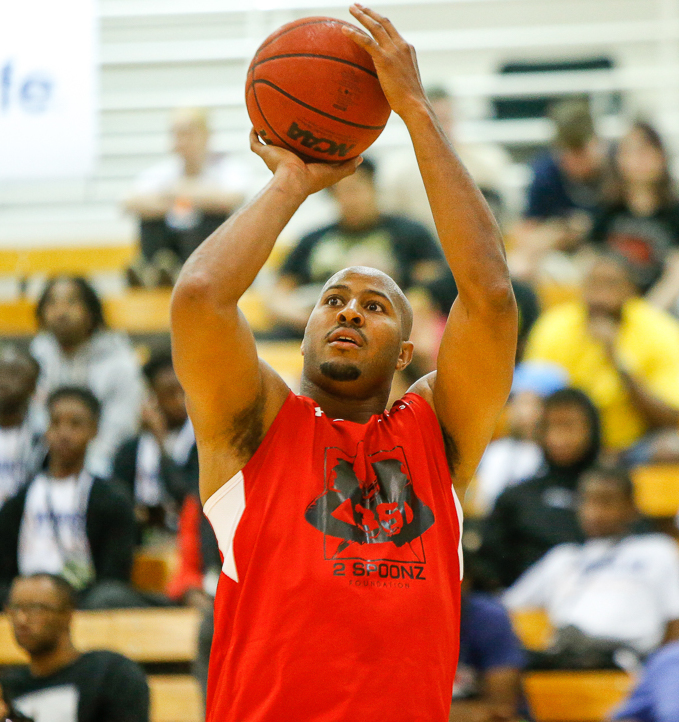

No. 81
- Position: Wide receiver

Personal information
- Born: November 22, 1987 (age 38); Birmingham, Alabama, U.S.
- Listed height: 6 ft 4 in (1.93 m)
- Listed weight: 230 lb (104 kg)

Career information
- High school: Rock Hill (Rock Hill, South Carolina)
- College: South Carolina
- NFL draft: 2011: undrafted

Career history
- Green Bay Packers (2011–2012)*; Minnesota Vikings (2012)*; Oakland Raiders (2012)*; Tampa Bay Buccaneers (2012)*; San Diego Chargers (2012)*; Baltimore Ravens (2013)*; Cleveland Browns (2013); Buffalo Bills (2014)*; Toronto Argonauts (2015–2016); Winnipeg Blue Bombers (2016); Ottawa Redblacks (2017)*
- * Offseason or practice squad member only

Career NFL statistics
- Receptions: 1
- Receiving yards: 15
- Stats at Pro Football Reference

Tori Gurley (born Norristorius Gurley on November 22, 1987) is an American former professional football player who was a wide receiver in the National Football League (NFL) and Canadian Football League (CFL). He played college football for the South Carolina Gamecocks, where he helped lead the Gamecocks to their first SEC East title and first SEC championship game appearance in 2010.

He is from Rock Hill, South Carolina and attended Rock Hill High School where he led the Bearcats to state championships in football and basketball as a senior. Through 2010 and 12 games, Gurley's career statistics at South Carolina were 824 receiving yards with 6 touchdowns and 70 receptions. In Gurley's last season for the Gamecocks he set a school record for having no dropped passes during the 2010 season.

== Personal life ==
As a two-sport athlete in high school, in Gurley's senior year he led Rock Hill High School to 2006 state championships in basketball and football. He originally committed to the University of North Carolina to play both football and basketball. When Gurley went to South Carolina, he changed his last name from Childers to Gurley in honor of his late father, who was 42 when he died in 2007.

== Prep school ==
Gurley attended New Hampton Prep School in New Hampshire for one year; he played both football and basketball. In his one year at New Hampton he caught 40 passes for 700 yards and 12 touchdowns and averaged 10 points and 8 rebounds a game in basketball.

== College career ==
=== Freshman ===
As a redshirt freshman in 2009, he made his collegiate debut against NC State where he caught four passes for 34 yards. Gurley known more as a physical possession wide receiver had three touchdown catches called back due to penalties during just his first two college starts. He caught his first career touchdown pass, a six-yard strike, from Stephen Garcia at Georgia. Gurley caught four passes for 100 yards in the win over FAU including a career-long 44-yarder he had four catches for 60 yards against Ole Miss, caught three passes for 62 yards in the win over Vanderbilt, including a one-handed 43-yard grab with the Gamecocks on their own one-yard line, caught four passes for 50 yards against Tennessee, caught two passes for 50 yards, including a 14-yard TD against Clemson. He played in all 13 games making five starts and was ranked fourth on the team with 31 catches, 440 receiving yards and a pair of touchdowns.

=== Sophomore ===
Gurley turned 2010 into another solid campaign, where he was the second leading receiver behind Alshon Jeffery. He helped lead the Gamecocks to a 9–3 record and a SEC East Division Championship. His most notable efforts came in a win at Vanderbilt where he tied a school record with 14 receptions (112 yards).

== Professional career ==
=== Green Bay Packers ===
Gurley was signed by the Green Bay Packers as an undrafted free agent on July 25, 2011. He was later signed to the practice squad.

Gurley was offered a spot of the Minnesota Vikings active 53-man roster towards the end of the 2011 regular season, but declined the offer, choosing to remain on the Green Bay practice squad.

Gurley was released by the Green Bay Packers on August 31, 2012.

=== Minnesota Vikings ===
Gurley was signed onto the Minnesota Vikings practice squad on September 1, 2012, but released later that month.

=== Oakland Raiders ===
Gurley was signed to the Oakland Raiders practice squad on September 25, 2012.

=== Tampa Bay Buccaneers ===
Gurley was signed to the Tampa Bay Buccaneers practice squad on October 17, 2012.

=== San Diego Chargers ===
Gurley was signed to the San Diego Chargers practice squad but subsequently released in November 2012.

=== Cleveland Browns ===
On May 23, 2013, Gurley was signed by the Cleveland Browns. He was cut on August 31, 2013, but signed to the practice squad two days later on September 2, 2013. He was signed from the practice squad on September 7, 2013, and played in two regular season games, compiling 1 reception on 2 targets for 15 yards. He was waived on September 17, 2013, and re-signed to their practice squad the next day. On October 18, 2013, Gurley was again signed from the practice squad and played on October 20 against his former team, the Green Bay Packers. He was waived again on October 22 and then re-signed to the practice squad on October 29. He was released again on May 19, 2014.

=== Buffalo Bills ===
Gurley signed with the Buffalo Bills during the 2014 offseason, but was released by the team on August 25, 2014.

=== Toronto Argonauts ===
On June 3, 2015, Gurley signed with the Toronto Argonauts of the Canadian Football League (CFL). Gurley finished the 2015 CFL season with 793 yards on 58 receptions and was the league leader in touchdown receptions with 10. In his second season in the CFL Gurley played in 10 of the Argos first 14 games, missing some with injury and others for team discipline. Following a Week 15 loss the Argos front office decided to release four of their wide receivers on the same day including Tori Gurley. Reports suggest the four wide receivers were not committed to the Argos and had been a source of division in the locker room for some time. In 10 games for the Argos Gurley caught 36 passes for 509 yards with 5 touchdowns.

=== Winnipeg Blue Bombers ===
Three days after being let go by Toronto, the Winnipeg Blue Bombers announced the signing of Gurley. Gurley played in two games for the Bombers to close out the 2016 season, catching 4 passes for 62 yards.

=== Ottawa Redblacks ===
As a free agent, Gurley signed a contract with the Ottawa Redblacks of the CFL on May 4, 2017. He was subsequently released by the organization on June 18, 2017, during final cuts after their two preseason games.

== CFL career statistics ==
Year	Team	Games played	Receptions	Receiving yards	Yards per reception	Longest reception	Receiving touchdowns
2015	Toronto Argonauts	16	58	791	13.6	46	10
2016	Toronto Argonauts	10	36	509	14.1	45	5
2016	Winnipeg Blue Bombers	2	4	62	15.5	33	0
TOTAL		28	98	1,362	13.9	46	15
