= Steve Taneyhill =

American football player (1973–2025)

No. 18
- Position: Quarterback

Personal information
- Born: July 21, 1973; Altoona, Pennsylvania, U.S.
- Died: December 15, 2025 (aged 52); Spartanburg, South Carolina, U.S.
- Listed height: 6 ft 5 in (1.96 m)
- Listed weight: 205 lb (93 kg)

Career information
- High school: Altoona Area
- College: South Carolina (1992–1995)
- NFL draft: 1996: undrafted

Career history

Playing
- Jacksonville Jaguars (1996–97)*; Frankfurt Galaxy (1997); New York CityHawks (1997)
- * Offseason or practice squad member only

Coaching
- Cambridge Academy (1998–2003); West Ashley High School (2004) (OC); Chesterfield High School (2005–2011); Union High School (2012–2015)

Stephen Thomas Taneyhill (July 21, 1973 – December 15, 2025) was an American businessman, college football player and high school football coach. He is most known for being the star quarterback for the South Carolina Gamecocks from 1992 to 1995, where he broke the school record for passing touchdowns and led the school to its first-ever bowl victory in the 1995 Carquest Bowl. In 2006, he was inducted into the University of South Carolina Athletic Hall of Fame. For more than a decade, Taneyhill coached football at multiple South Carolina high schools, winning several state titles. He also owned several businesses in the state, including three bars in Five Points and Columbia, and a restaurant in Spartanburg.

== Early life ==
Stephen Thomas Taneyhill was born on July 21, 1973, to Art and Susan Taneyhill. His father was a star basketball coach at Altoona High School who won two national championships. While at Altoona High School, Taneyhill played both basketball and football. As a point guard, Taneyhill scored 1,400 points during his time to set a record at the school. As a quarterback in football, he threw for over 5,200 yards.

== College career ==
Many teams reached out to Taneyhill to express interest in signing him, including the Miami Hurricanes, the Florida State Seminoles, and the Alabama Crimson Tide. He came closest to signing with Alabama, though he would later switch to playing with the South Carolina Gamecocks. The switch has been credited to the Alabama coaching staff's comparison of Taneyhill to Alabama alumni Joe Namath and Carolina's proximity and opportunities.

Taneyhill came to the University of South Carolina as an ambitious freshman, claiming that he would be the starter in April during the off-season despite competition from a senior and a redshirt freshman. Eventually, after a 0-5 start to the season, Taneyhill was named the starter. After a rough initial performance where he had to be replaced by senior Wright Mitchell during the second quarter of a game, he led the team to a 5–1 record and was named Freshman of the Year by Sports Illustrated and listed on the Football News Freshman All-American Team.

During his junior year Taneyhill threw for 2,259 yards and led the Gamecocks to a bowl game. In the 1995 Carquest Bowl, South Carolina beat West Virginia in their first ever bowl game win.

In a preview for Taneyhill's final game with the Gamecocks, Josh Peters of The State described him as "if not [...] the best quarterback in USC history, certainly [...] the most unforgettable." He was noted for his unique appearance, sporting long hair and an earring. His hair led to a dispute at a local bar when he first arrived on campus, though he was allowed to keep it at its length throughout time with head coach Sparky Woods. Taneyhill was forced to cut his ponytail when Woods was replaced by Brad Scott in 1994.

As a USC Gamecocks quarterback, Taneyhill compiled 8,782 passing yards, completing 753 passes. He threw 62 touchdown passes in his career. His amount of completions and passing touchdowns are records at South Carolina. He also set university records for single-game passing yards, passing touchdowns, and total offense in a win against the Mississippi State Bulldogs. He was inducted into the University of South Carolina Athletic Hall of Fame in 2006.

== Professional career ==
Taneyhill decided to approach his entrance into professional football much more patiently than when he entered his college career. He went undrafted and spent two seasons on-and-off the Jacksonville Jaguars practice squad during the 1996 and 1997 off-season. He later spent time with the Frankfurt Galaxy of the World League of American Football and the New York CityHawks of the Arena Football League in 1997.

== Coaching career ==
Taneyhill began coaching at Cambridge Academy private school in 1998, coming into a team that was struggling to keep the members necessary to play eight-man football. He had kept all of his playbooks from each team he had played for since the seventh grade to be used during games. During his time with the high school, Taneyhill led the team to back-to-back eight-man championships in 2000 and 2001. The high school shut down in 2003 due to decreased attendance, surprising Taneyhill. In between head coaching jobs, he served as passing-game coordinator for West Ashley High School under head coach Fred Hamilton in 2004.

Taneyhill joined Chesterfield High School in 2005 as their head coach. Before he joined the team, Chesterfield had only won one game after two seasons. He led the Chesterfield High School football team to the South Carolina state championship, where they lost to Carvers Bay. The team went on to win three consecutive titles from 2007 to 2009.

Taneyhill left Chesterfield to assume the head coaching spot for the Union County High School Yellow Jackets in 2012. He made it to a state title appearance in his first season with the team. Taneyhill was let go as head coach of Union County High School after four seasons with the team in 2015.

== Personal life and death ==
While at South Carolina in 1993, Taneyhill was arrested for underage drinking after a game against the Georgia Bulldogs. The arrest sparked outrage among students, leading to a "Free Taneyhill" movement. He pleaded guilty to the crime, and spent 30 hours doing community service with children to get the charge expunged from his record.

In 2016, Taneyhill purchased the Five Points, Columbia bar Group Therapy, and renamed it "Steve Taneyhill's Group Therapy". Taneyhill had ownership of Prime Restaurant and Whiskey Lounge located in Spartanburg, South Carolina, open in the summer of 2022. He announced that he had purchased Breakers Bar and Grill and Breakers Live in the summer of 2023.

Taneyhill died after a battle with insulinoma, a rare malignant cancer, on December 15, 2025, at the age of 52. He was found dead in his home in Spartanburg.
