= Spencer Lanning =

American football player (born 1988)

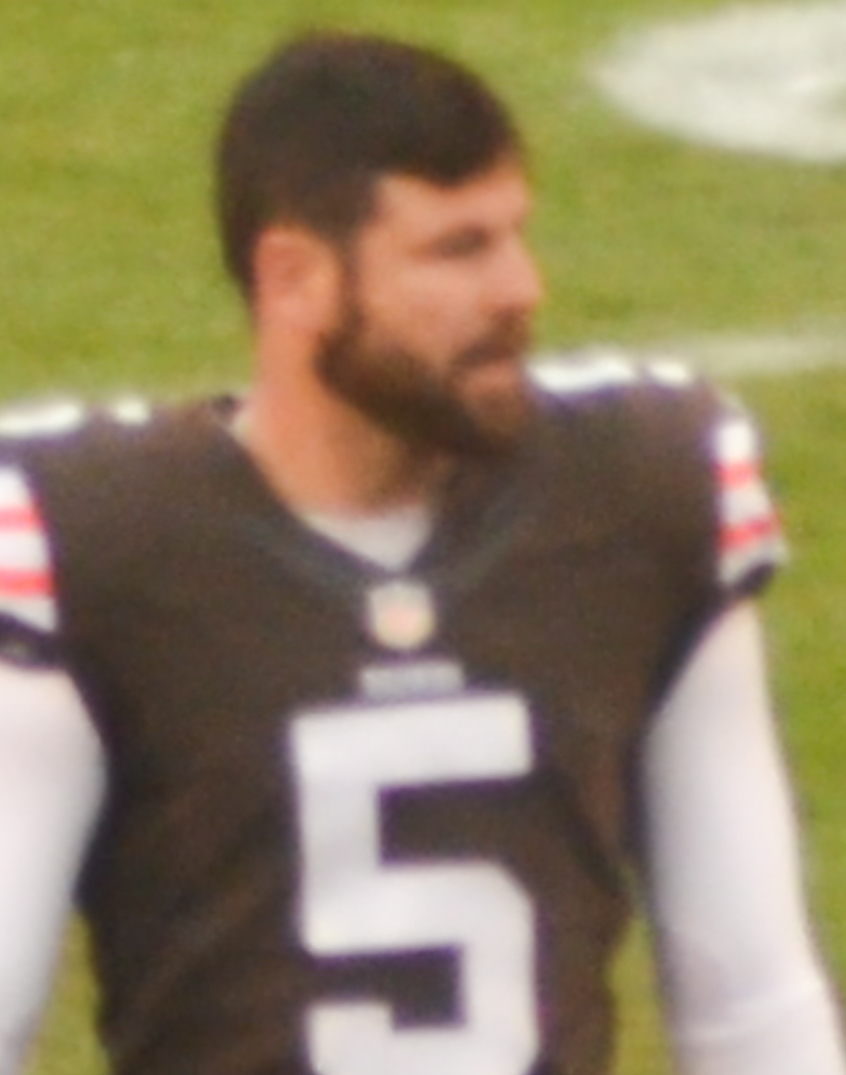
- Lanning with the Cleveland Browns in 2014

No. 5, 4
- Position: Punter

Personal information
- Born: May 21, 1988 (age 38); Rock Hill, South Carolina, U.S.
- Listed height: 5 ft 11 in (1.80 m)
- Listed weight: 200 lb (91 kg)

Career information
- High school: York Comprehensive (York, South Carolina)
- College: South Carolina
- NFL draft: 2011: undrafted

Career history
- Chicago Bears (2011)*; Jacksonville Jaguars (2012)*; Cleveland Browns (2012)*; New York Jets (2012)*; Sacramento Mountain Lions (2012); Cleveland Browns (2013−2014); Tampa Bay Buccaneers (2015)*; Denver Broncos (2015)*; Chicago Bears (2015)
- * Offseason or practice squad member only

Career NFL statistics
- Punts: 180
- Punting yards: 7,934
- Punting average: 44.0
- Stats at Pro Football Reference

Spencer Davis Lanning (born May 21, 1988) is an American former professional football player who was a punter for three seasons in the National Football League (NFL), almost exclusively with the Cleveland Browns. He was signed by the Chicago Bears as an undrafted free agent in 2011. He played college football for the South Carolina Gamecocks.

== College career ==
Lanning finished his collegiate career with the South Carolina Gamecocks with 171 punts for a 42.6-yard average and 46 punts inside the 20-yard line. He also played kicker during his final two collegiate seasons, connecting on 34 of 44 field goal attempts and 80 of 84 extra points.

== Professional career ==
Pre-draft measurables
Height	Weight
5 ft 10 6/7 in (1.80 m)	195 lb (88 kg)
Values from South Carolina's Pro Day

=== Chicago Bears ===
Lanning was originally signed by the Chicago Bears as an undrafted free agent in 2011.

=== Jacksonville Jaguars ===
Lanning was signed by the Jacksonville Jaguars as a free agent on January 4, 2012, and later released by the team on April 28.

=== New York Jets ===
Lanning was claimed off waivers by the New York Jets on August 28, 2012. He was waived by the Jets on August 31, 2012.

=== Sacramento Mountain Lions ===
In 2012, he signed with the Sacramento Mountain Lions of the United Football League.

=== Cleveland Browns ===
Lanning was signed by the Cleveland Browns on May 2, 2012. Lanning was re-signed as a free agent by the Browns February 13, 2013. On September 22, 2013, in a 31–27 win over the Minnesota Vikings, Lanning recorded a touchdown pass, punt, and an extra point. He became the first player to accomplish such a feat since Sam Baker in 1968.

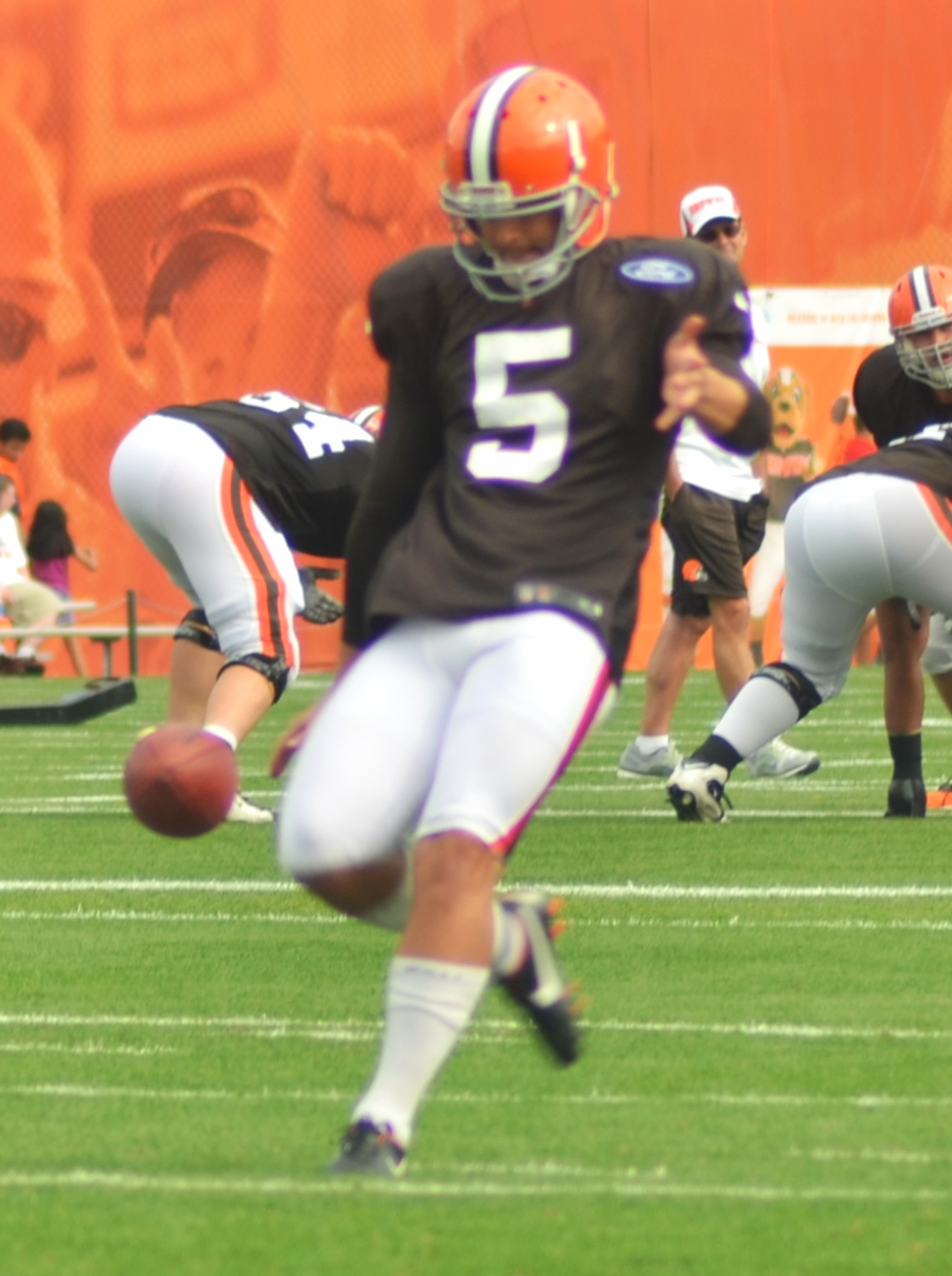
Lanning with the Cleveland Browns in 2013

Lanning garnered media attention following a game against the Pittsburgh Steelers on September 7, 2014. When Lanning attempted to tackle Steelers punt returner Antonio Brown, Brown "attempted" to hurdle the punter and kicked Lanning in the face. Brown was flagged for unnecessary roughness on the play and received an $8,200 fine.

Lanning was released on June 6, 2015, when the Browns traded for longtime San Francisco 49ers punter Andy Lee.

=== Tampa Bay Buccaneers ===
Lanning was claimed off waivers by the Tampa Bay Buccaneers on June 9, 2015. He was later released by the team on August 13.

=== Denver Broncos ===
The Denver Broncos claimed Lanning off waivers on August 14, 2015. He was released by the team on August 31.

=== Chicago Bears (second stint) ===
The Chicago Bears signed Lanning on October 3, 2015, to punt for Week 4 in place of the injured Pat O'Donnell. He was released by the team on October 6. In his lone game with the Bears, Lanning punted three times for 156 yards with a net average of 35.7.

== Personal life ==
On November 11, 2014, Lanning became engaged to Brittany Jasenski.
