= Connor Shaw =

American football player (born 1991)

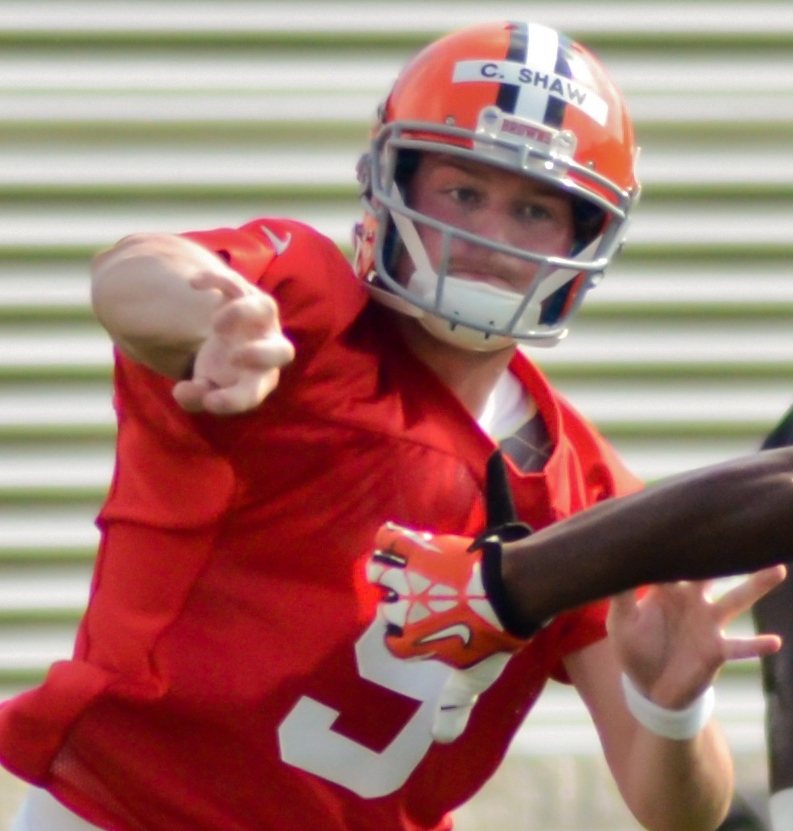
- Shaw at Cleveland Browns training camp in 2014

No. 9
- Position: Quarterback

Personal information
- Born: September 19, 1991 (age 35); Flowery Branch, Georgia, U.S.
- Listed height: 6 ft 0 in (1.83 m)
- Listed weight: 206 lb (93 kg)

Career information
- High school: Flowery Branch
- College: South Carolina (2010–2013)
- NFL draft: 2014: undrafted

Career history

Playing
- Cleveland Browns (2014–2015); Chicago Bears (2016–2017)

Coaching
- Furman (2018) Tight ends coach; South Carolina (2020) Quarterbacks coach (last 3 games)

Operations
- South Carolina (2020) Director of player development; South Carolina (2021) Director of football relations

Career NFL statistics
- Passing attempts: 28
- Passing completions: 14
- Completion percentage: 50.0%
- TD–INT: 0–1
- Passing yards: 177
- Passer rating: 55.2
- Stats at Pro Football Reference

Connor McClure Shaw (born September 19, 1991) is an American former professional football player who was a quarterback in the National Football League (NFL). He played college football for the South Carolina Gamecocks, starting at quarterback from 2011 through 2013. He was signed by the Cleveland Browns as an undrafted free agent in 2014. He was also a member of the Chicago Bears.

== Early life ==
Shaw played at Flowery Branch High School in Georgia and played for his father Lee. He passed for 5,300 yards in 2 years as the starter and was a receiver his sophomore season having 1,200 yards receiving. He was considered a 3 star recruit and received offers from South Carolina, Georgia Tech, Stanford, Wake Forest, West Virginia and East Carolina his senior year.

== College career ==
After a loss to Auburn in 2011, Stephen Garcia was benched due to inconsistent play. Shaw then passed for 311 yards and four touchdowns in a blowout of Kentucky. Shaw was named the SEC's offensive player of the week due to his performance. After missing his first pass of the game on September 22, 2012, Shaw completed his final 20 passes for 252 yards and 2 touchdowns as the Gamecocks defeated Missouri 31–10 at Williams-Brice Stadium.

On October 26, 2013, Shaw was unable to start because of illness and a sprained left knee but came off the bench to lead the Gamecocks from a 17-point deficit to defeat the No. 5 Missouri Tigers 27–24 in double overtime. After leading the Gamecocks to a 31–17 victory over rivals Clemson on December 1, 2013, Shaw had the best record as a quarterback in Gamecock history, finishing with a 27–5 record as a starter, including a perfect 17–0 at home. On December 6, Shaw was invited to play in the 2014 NFLPA Collegiate Bowl.

In his final college game on January 1, 2014, Shaw ran for a touchdown, threw 3 touchdowns and caught 1 touchdown and went 22–24 throwing for 312 yards in the Capital One Bowl. He was voted the game's most valuable player for his performance.

== Professional career ==
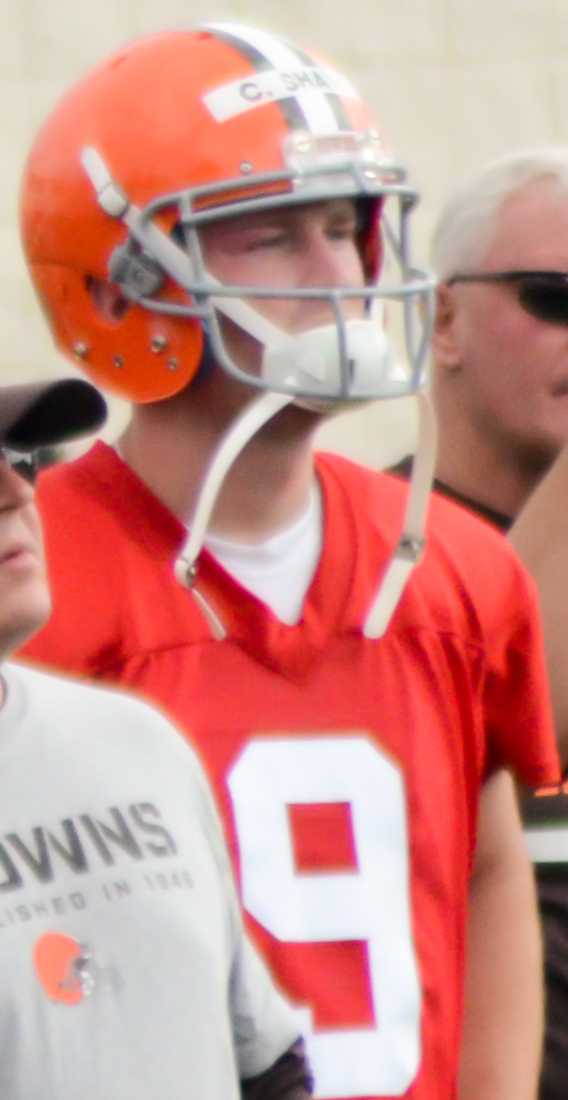
Shaw in 2014

Pre-draft measurables
Height	Weight	Arm length	Hand span	40-yard dash	10-yard split	20-yard split	20-yard shuttle	Three-cone drill	Vertical jump	Broad jump	Wonderlic
6 ft 0 3/8 in (1.84 m)	206 lb (93 kg)	30 in (0.76 m)	9 1/4 in (0.23 m)	4.66 s	1.67 s	2.72 s	4.33 s	7.07 s	34 in (0.86 m)	9 ft 8 in (2.95 m)	23
All values from NFL Combine

=== Cleveland Browns ===
Shaw went undrafted in the 2014 NFL draft, and later signed with the Cleveland Browns following the draft. In his preseason debut, he completed 8 of 9 passes for 123 yards with one touchdown and no interceptions against the Washington Redskins. He was released on August 30, 2014, but re-signed to their practice squad the next day.

Due to injuries to Johnny Manziel and Brian Hoyer, on December 22, 2014, Shaw was called up from the practice squad to be on the active roster. Shaw was also announced as the starter for the season finale against the Baltimore Ravens. Starting against the Ravens in his first and only career NFL game, Shaw went 14/28 for 177 yards with 1 interception and 0 touchdowns, including a 49-yard pass to wide receiver Taylor Gabriel after avoiding pressure.

On August 13, 2015, in a preseason game versus the Washington Redskins, Shaw injured multiple ligaments in his thumb, requiring surgery. It was reported that he would be facing a 12-week recovery time along with rehab, likely keep him out for the season.

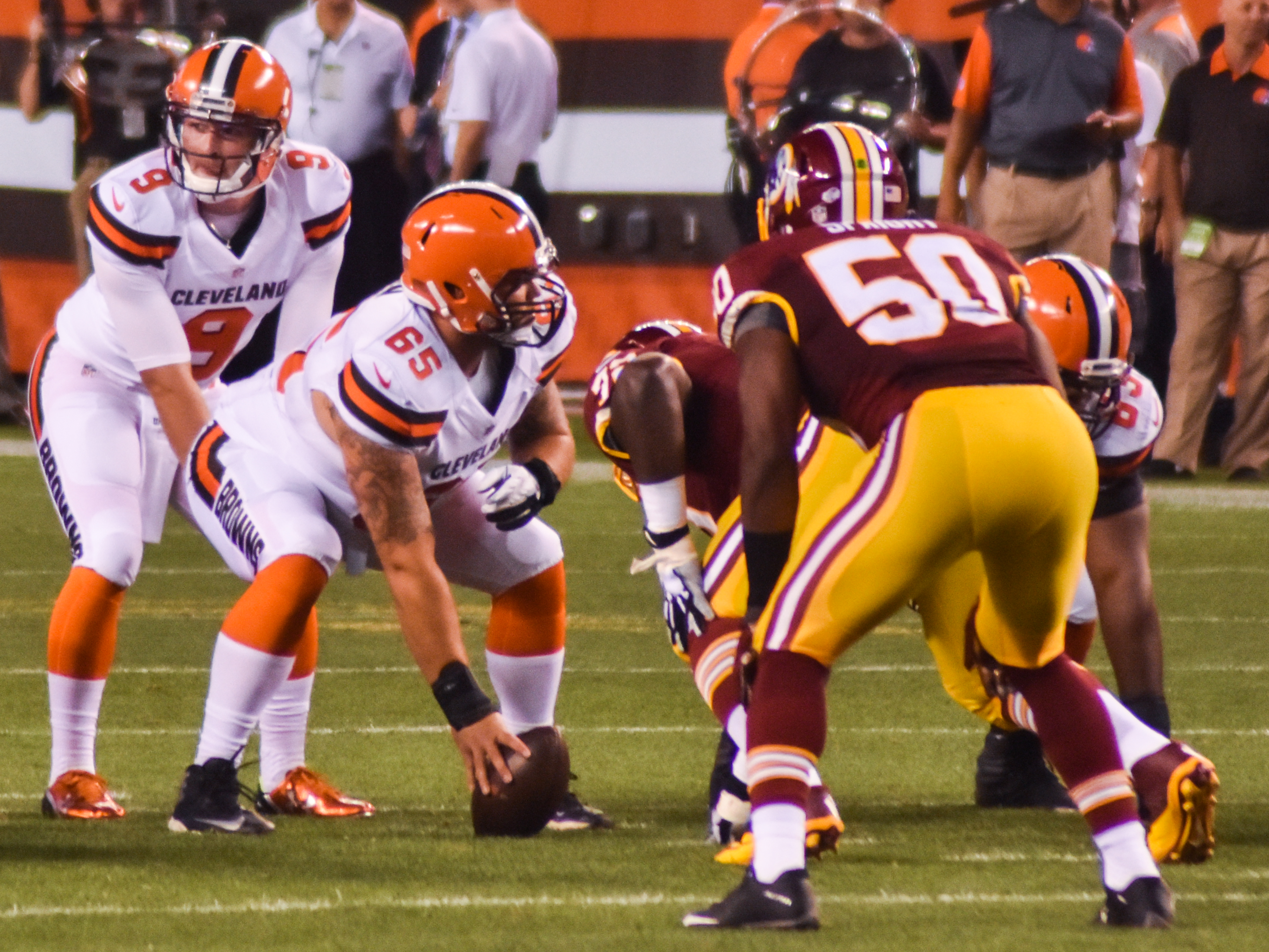
Shaw under center during the 2015 preseason

On June 30, 2016, Shaw was released by the Browns.

=== Chicago Bears ===
On July 1, 2016, Shaw was claimed off waivers by the Chicago Bears. The New Orleans Saints had accidentally sent out an email to the other 31 NFL teams, instead of the league office, indicating that they intended to claim Shaw off waivers. The Bears had waiver-claim priority over the Saints because of a worse 2015 record. On August 30, 2016, Shaw was placed on injured reserve for a broken leg sustained in preseason.

On March 4, 2017, Shaw signed a one-year extension with the Bears. On May 30, 2017, he was waived by the Bears, becoming a free agent only to have the Bears rescind the waiver on the same day following an injury to Mark Sanchez. He suffered a hamstring injury during a preseason game against the Cleveland Browns on August 31. He was waived/injured on September 2 and placed on injured reserve on September 4, 2017. He was released on September 8, 2017.

== Career statistics ==
=== NFL ===
Year	Team	Games			Passing								Rushing				Sacks		Fumbles (Note: Fumbles lost data taken from Pro Football Reference career game log)	
Year	Team	GP	GS	Record	Cmp	Att	Pct	Yds	Y/A	TD	Int	Rtg	Att	Yds	Avg	TD	Sck	SckY	Fum	Lost
2014	CLE	1	1	0–1	14	28	50.0	177	6.3	0	1	55.2	7	9	1.3	0	4	27	1	1
2015	CLE	0	0	DNP																
2016	CHI	0	0	DNP																
Career		1	1	0–1	14	28	50.0	177	6.3	0	1	55.2	7	9	1.3	0	4	27	1	1

=== College ===
Season	Team	Passing								Rushing			
Season	Team	Cmp	Att	Pct	Yds	Y/A	TD	Int	Rtg	Att	Yds	Avg	TD
2010	South Carolina	23	33	69.7	223	6.8	1	2	124.3	32	165	5.2	0
2011	South Carolina	123	188	65.4	1,448	7.7	14	6	148.3	135	525	3.9	8
2012	South Carolina	154	228	67.5	1,956	8.6	17	7	158.1	131	435	3.3	3
2013	South Carolina	180	284	63.4	2,447	8.6	24	1	162.9	154	567	3.7	6
Career		480	733	65.5	6,074	8.3	56	16	155.9	452	1,683	3.7	17

== Coaching career ==
In January 2018, Shaw signed on to be a tight ends coach at Furman University. In August, prior to the start of the season, Shaw resigned due to his commitment in an undisclosed "private business" opportunity. The Paladins went on to go 6–4 over the course of the season and win a share of the conference championship.

Shaw returned to the University of South Carolina in 2020 as the director of player development. On November 16, 2020, after the firing of Will Muschamp, Shaw was promoted to interim quarterbacks coach at South Carolina. New Gamecocks head coach Shane Beamer stated that Shaw will remain a part of South Carolina's football program in the 2021 season, but not at the quarterbacks coach position, which has been filled by new offensive coordinator Marcus Satterfield.

In February 2021, Shaw's expanded role was announced as Director of Football Relations, with duties in recruiting, current player relations, and serving as a liaison to former players.
