= Todd Ellis (American football) =

American football player (born 1967)

Profile
- Position: Quarterback

Personal information
- Born: May 16, 1967 (age 59)
- Listed height: 6 ft 0 in (1.83 m)

Career information
- High school: Walter H. Page (Greensboro, North Carolina)
- College: South Carolina
- NFL draft: 1990: 9th round, 247th overall pick

Career history
- Denver Broncos (1990)*; Sacramento Surge (1991)
- * Offseason or practice squad member only

Todd Ellis (born May 16, 1967) is an American former football quarterback. He was drafted by the Denver Broncos in the ninth round of the 1990 NFL draft, but never appeared in an NFL game. He played one season for the Sacramento Surge of the World League of American Football. Ellis played college football at South Carolina. He has since returned to the Columbia area, where he maintains a law practice. Ellis is best known for serving as the play-by-play man for radio broadcasts of USC football games, from which he has gained the nickname “The Voice of the Gamecocks”. He also hosts both "The Shane Beamer Show" and "Carolina Calls With Shane Beamer", on TV and radio respectively.
