= Brad Scott (American football) =

American football player and coach (born 1954)

Biographical details
- Born: September 30, 1954 (age 72); Arcadia, Florida, U.S.

Playing career
- 1975–1979: Missouri–Rolla
- Position: Offensive line

Coaching career (HC unless noted)
- 1979: Desoto County HS (FL) (assistant)
- 1980: Hardee County HS (FL)
- 1981: The Citadel (GA)
- 1982: Desoto County HS (FL)
- 1983–1984: Florida State (GA)
- 1985–1989: Florida State (TE)
- 1990–1993: Florida State (OC/OL)
- 1994–1998: South Carolina
- 1999–2000: Clemson (TE)
- 2001–2003: Clemson (OC/TE)
- 2004–2008: Clemson (OL)
- 2008-2011: Clemson (AHC/OL)

Administrative career (AD unless noted)
- 2011–2019: Clemson (assistant AD)
- 2020–2022: South Florida (football chief of staff)

Head coaching record
- Overall: 23–32–1 (college)
- Bowls: 1–0

Harvey Bradford Scott (born September 30, 1954) is an American former football coach and player who was most recently the football chief of staff for the University of South Florida Bulls football team. He was previously the associate head coach and offensive line coach for the Clemson Tigers football team and was also the head coach of the South Carolina Gamecocks from 1994 to 1998.

== Career ==
Scott came to South Carolina after 11 years as an assistant at Florida State under Bobby Bowden, the last four as offensive coordinator. While at Florida State, he helped develop Heisman Trophy winner Charlie Ward, as well as the "Fast Break" offense that netted the Seminoles a national title in 1993.

In his first year at South Carolina, he led the Gamecocks to a 6–5 regular season. Despite a 4–4 record in Southeastern Conference play, Scott's Gamecocks routed Clemson 33–7 in the last game of the season. That earned them a berth in the Carquest Bowl, where they beat West Virginia 24–21. It was the first bowl win in the program's 102-year history—one of the longest droughts in the country at the time.

Scott's tenure at South Carolina would prove to be short-lived, as he was only able to put together one more winning season, in 1996—only the second year he managed a .500 record in conference play. In 1998, after defeating Ball State to open the season, the Gamecocks lost 10 games in a row to finish 1–10, the worst record in school history at the time. Scott was fired after the 1998 season. Shortly afterward, he was hired as tight ends coach by in-state rival Clemson, which was coached at the time by Tommy Bowden, Bobby Bowden's younger son. Scott was promoted to offensive coordinator in 2001, a job he held for three seasons. Scott was then demoted to offensive line coach after the 2003 season.

After Tommy Bowden was forced to resign in the middle of the 2008 season, Scott was named associate head coach under new head coach Dabo Swinney.

In 2020 he left Clemson with his son and joined the USF staff. Brad vacated the position following Jeff Scott's firing after the 2022 season.

== Personal life ==
Scott's son, Jeff, was a wide receiver at Clemson when Brad was the offensive coordinator for the Tigers and was the head coach for the University of South Florida's football team from 2020 to 2022.

== Head coaching record ==
=== College ===
Year	Team	Overall	Conference	Standing	Bowl/playoffs
South Carolina Gamecocks (Southeastern Conference) (1994–1998)
1994	South Carolina	7–5	4–4	3rd (Eastern)	W Carquest
1995	South Carolina	4–6–1	2–5–1	4th (Eastern)	
1996	South Carolina	6–5	4–4	3rd (Eastern)	
1997	South Carolina	5–6	3–5	4th (Eastern)	
1998	South Carolina	1–10	0–8	6th (Eastern)	
South Carolina:		23–32–1	13–26–1		
Total:		23–32–1			
