= Stephen Garcia =

American football player (born 1988)

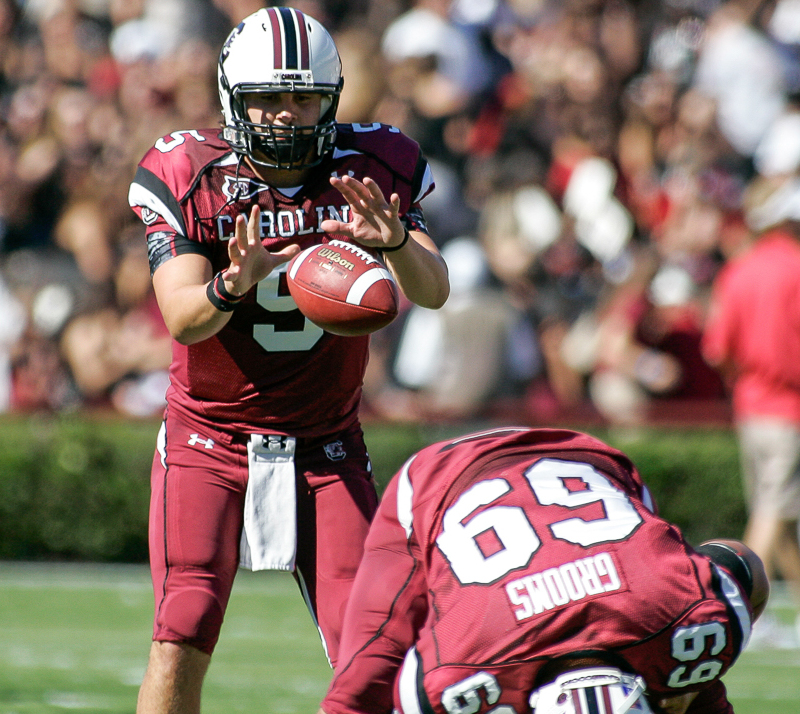
- Garcia with South Carolina in 2010

No. 12
- Position: Quarterback

Personal information
- Born: February 15, 1988 (age 38); Lutz, Florida, U.S.
- Listed height: 6 ft 2 in (1.88 m)
- Listed weight: 232 lb (105 kg)

Career information
- High school: Jefferson (Tampa, Florida)
- College: South Carolina (2007–2011)
- NFL draft: 2012: undrafted

Career history
- Montreal Alouettes (2012); Tampa Bay Storm (2014); Birmingham Iron (2019)*
- * Offseason or practice squad member only

Awards and highlights
- Most pass attempts in South Carolina single season (2009); Third-team All-SEC Phil Steele (2010); Fourth-team All-SEC Phil Steele (2009)

Career AFL statistics
- Comp. / Att.: 1 / 4
- Passing yards: 6
- TD–INT: 0–0
- Passer rating: 39.58
- Stats at ArenaFan.com

Stephen Glenn Garcia (born February 15, 1988) is an American former football quarterback. He played college football for the University of South Carolina. Garcia had a 20–14 record as a starter for the Gamecocks. He completed 7,597 passing yards including 47 touchdowns and 41 interceptions. He also rushed for 777 yards and 15 touchdowns. Garcia was suspended five times during his college career and ultimately dismissed from the football program midway through his final season of eligibility. He currently works as an independent quarterback coach in Tampa.

== College career ==
=== Freshman ===
Although a highly touted recruit, during his first semester on campus in the Spring of 2007, Garcia was suspended twice from practice after being arrested for public intoxication and, later, keying a professor's car. These charges were dropped after Garcia made restitution to the professor and completed a pre-trial intervention program. The following Spring, in March 2008, Garcia and two teammates were arrested and cited for underage drinking. That same evening, Garcia pulled a fire alarm and discharged a fire extinguisher in his dormitory. No formal charges were filed but, as a result of these incidents, Garcia was suspended from the university. After his reinstatement, as a redshirt freshman in the Fall of 2008, Garcia started three games for the Gamecocks. He was named SEC Freshman of the Week for his performance in a 24–17 victory over Kentucky (169 passing yards and 1 touchdown in a half of play). Garcia finished the 2008 season with 832 passing yards, 6 touchdowns, and 8 interceptions. He also accounted for 198 rushing yards and two rushing touchdowns.

=== Sophomore ===
In 2009, with Garcia as their starting quarterback, the Gamecocks had a 7–6 record and made an appearance in the PapaJohns.com Bowl. Garcia posted four 300-yard passing games (Georgia, Vanderbilt, Tennessee, and Arkansas) with victories over two Top-25 opponents (Ole Miss and Clemson). The Gamecocks victory over the Rebels was the second defeat of a Top-5 opponent in program history. In the regular season finale against rival Clemson, Garcia passed for 126 yards (3 touchdowns, 1 interception) and rushed for 46 yards. For the 2009 season, he passed for 2,862 yards with 17 touchdowns and 10 interceptions, adding 186 rushing yards and four rushing touchdowns.

=== Junior ===
In the 2010 season, the Gamecocks posted a 9–5 record (5–3 SEC), won the SEC East title, and finished #22 in both the AP and Coaches' Final Polls. South Carolina got its first-ever win over a #1-ranked opponent (Alabama) and beat division rivals Georgia, Florida, and Tennessee for the first time in the same season. The Gamecocks also defeated Clemson for the second consecutive year and faced the eventual BCS national champion Auburn Tigers in the SEC Championship Game (56–17 loss). The season concluded with an appearance in the Chick-fil-A Bowl against Florida State, who defeated Carolina 26–17. For the 2010 season, Garcia passed for 3,059 yards with 20 touchdowns and 14 interceptions (64.2 completion percentage), adding 222 rushing yards and six touchdowns on the ground.

=== Senior ===
At the opening of 2011 spring practices, Garcia was suspended for one week for violating team rules during the bowl trip in December 2010. In April 2011, Garcia was suspended indefinitely for causing a disturbance at an SEC-mandated meeting designed to encourage good life choices beyond college. Garcia was allowed to return to the team for voluntary summer workouts in June. In August, he was officially reinstated for fall camp and played in the first five games of the 2011 season. But on October 11, South Carolina athletic director Eric Hyman announced Garcia had been dismissed from the program. Garcia failed to meet agreed-upon guidelines established by the team as a condition of his reinstatement, reportedly failing a substance screening for alcohol consumption. Though on a recent interview with Coach Spurrier states he failed a drug test and implies the dismissal was not related to alcohol. In his final five games as a Gamecock, Garcia completed 61 of 118 passes (51.7 percent) for 844 yards with four touchdowns and nine interceptions, as well as three rushing touchdowns.

== Professional career ==
Garcia went undrafted in the 2012 NFL draft.

On June 27, 2012, he signed a three-year deal with the Montreal Alouettes. He spent the 2012 season on the injured list and did not play. On May 6, 2013, Garcia was released by Montreal.

On January 6, 2014, he was assigned to the Tampa Bay Storm of the Arena Football League. On April 24, 2014, the Storm placed Garcia on reassignment. On May 14, 2014 the Storm placed Garcia on league suspension. Garcia was reassigned by the Storm on July 17, 2014.

He then worked as an individual quarterback coach.

He was signed by the Birmingham Iron as a quarterback in 2018. However, he was not selected in the 2019 AAF QB Draft.

== Personal life and health ==
Garcia is married to his wife, Maria. In May 2026, Garcia announced that he had been diagnosed with stage IV colorectal cancer. In November 2026, he announced that he was cancer free.
