= 1996 NFL draft =

National Football League Draft

General information
- Date: April 20–21, 1996
- Location: Paramount Theatre at MSG in New York City, New York
- Network: ESPN

Overview
- 254 total selections in 7 rounds
- League: NFL
- First selection: Keyshawn Johnson, WR; New York Jets
- Mr. Irrelevant: Sam Manuel, LB; San Francisco 49ers
- Most selections (13): New England Patriots
- Fewest selections (5): Kansas City Chiefs
- Hall of Famers: 7: OT Jonathan Ogden; WR Marvin Harrison; LB Ray Lewis; S Brian Dawkins; WR Terrell Owens; LB Zach Thomas; K Adam Vinatieri

The 1996 NFL draft was the procedure by which National Football League teams selected amateur college football players. It is officially known as the NFL Annual Player Selection Meeting. The draft was held April 20–21, 1996, at the Paramount Theatre at Madison Square Garden in New York City, New York. No teams chose to claim any players in the supplemental draft that year. As a result of the Cleveland Browns relocation controversy, all draft rights held by the deactivated Cleveland Browns franchise were transferred to the new Baltimore Ravens franchise.

On draft day, the St. Louis Rams traded running back Jerome Bettis and a third-round draft pick to the Pittsburgh Steelers in exchange for a second-round pick for that year, as well as a fourth-round pick the following year. The trade was made immediately after the Rams drafted Nebraska running back Lawrence Phillips. Bettis went on to have a successful career with the Steelers as well as being one of the team's most popular players, while the Rams did not have another feature back until they traded for Marshall Faulk three years later due to Phillips's off-field problems.

The draft also saw one of the longest waits for a player in attendance of the draft, as Leeland McElroy waited until being selected in the second round by the Arizona Cardinals with the 32nd pick. McElroy, who ended up being a draft bust, would set the precedent for later players who have waited while in attendance, including Ben Roethlisberger and Aaron Rodgers, who unlike McElroy would go on to successful NFL careers.

This draft is considered one of the best draft classes ever for the position of wide receiver. Keyshawn Johnson, Terry Glenn, Eddie Kennison, Marvin Harrison, Eric Moulds, Bobby Engram, Terrell Owens, Muhsin Muhammad, Amani Toomer, Jermaine Lewis and Joe Horn have all achieved success in the pros, with all except Kennison, Engram and Toomer having reached the Pro Bowl at least once, and a total of 26 Pro Bowl appearances for the group. In addition to the class having had several successful receivers, none of the five wide receivers drafted in the first round have been busts, as all of them spent at least a reasonable amount of time as starters in the NFL. Combined, 1996 wide receivers (through the end of the 2006 season) have totalled 7,646 receptions for 105,866 yards, eclipsing any other class by more than 1,000 receptions and 10,000 yards.

It was also one of the best draft years for middle linebackers, with Hall of Famers Ray Lewis and Zach Thomas selected. Lewis won Super Bowl XXXV with the Baltimore Ravens and was selected MVP of that game. Lewis also won Super Bowl XLVII in the final game of his career and made 13 Pro Bowls along with being a seven-time first-team All-Pro, while Zach Thomas made seven Pro Bowls, and was a five-time first-team All-Pro. Other linebackers who made at least one Pro Bowl from this draft are Tedy Bruschi, Kevin Hardy, Simeon Rice, John Mobley and Donnie Edwards. Randall Godfrey, Earl Holmes and Carlos Emmons also had solid careers in the league. Ironically, ESPN draft expert Mel Kiper said before the draft that it was one of the weakest for the position, which he would ultimately be proven wrong.

In contrast to its successes at wide receiver and linebacker, the 1996 draft has been rated as the worst for quarterbacks. None of the eight quarterbacks drafted made the Pro Bowl or an All-Pro team, and half did not play. As of 2026, this remains the last draft without a quarterback selected in the first round. Previously, the 1988 draft had been the last with no quarterback selected in the first round. (Note: The first quarterback in the 1988 draft was not selected until the third round.)

The last remaining active player in the NFL from the 1996 draft class was Ray Lewis, who retired after the 2012 season, right after winning Super Bowl XLVII as a member of the Baltimore Ravens.

== Player selections ==
| * | Compensatory selection |
| ¤ | Extra selection awarded to expansion team |
| † | Pro Bowler (Note: Players are identified as a Pro Bowler if they were selected for the Pro Bowl at any time in their career.) |
| ‡ | Hall of Famer (Note: Players are identified as a Hall of Famer if they have been inducted into the Pro Football Hall of Fame.) |

Positions key
| Offense | Defense | Special teams |
|---|---|---|
| QB — Quarterback; RB — Running back; FB — Fullback; WR — Wide receiver; TE — Tight end; OL — Offensive lineman; T — Tackle; G — Guard; C — Center | DL — Defensive lineman; DT — Defensive tackle (Note: Includes nose tackle (NT)); DE — Defensive end; EDGE — Edge rusher; LB — Linebacker (Note: Includes middle linebacker (MLB/MIKE), weakside linebacker (WILL), strongside linebacker (SAM), off-ball linebacker, and outside linebacker (OLB)); DB — Defensive back; CB — Cornerback; S — Safety (Note: Includes free safety (FS) and strong safety (SS)) | K — Kicker (Note: Also known as a placekicker (PK)); P — Punter; LS — Long snapper; RS — Return specialist (Note: Includes kickoff and punt returners) |

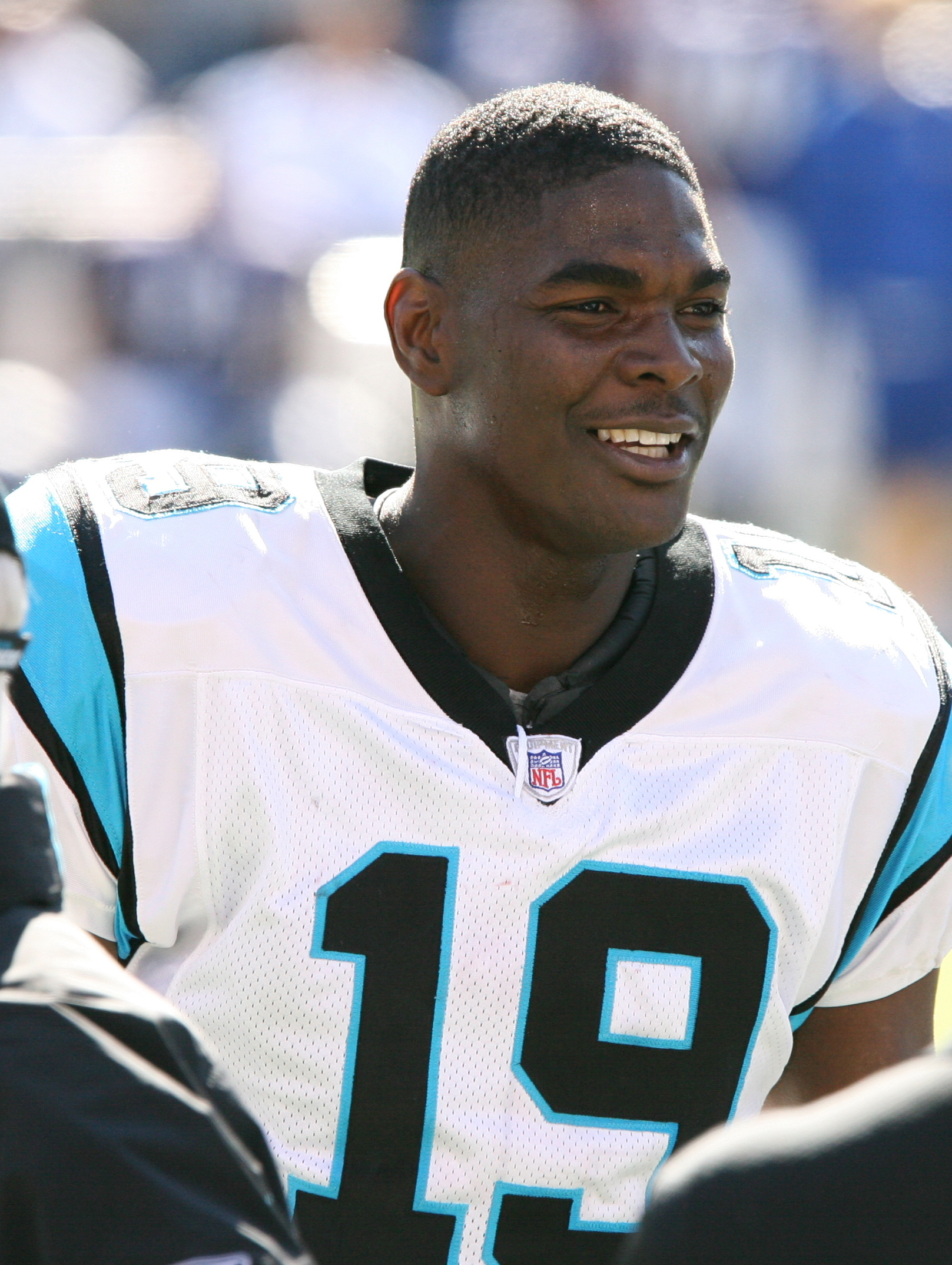
Keyshawn Johnson, selected first overall by the Jets, was a three-time Pro Bowler and Super Bowl champion.

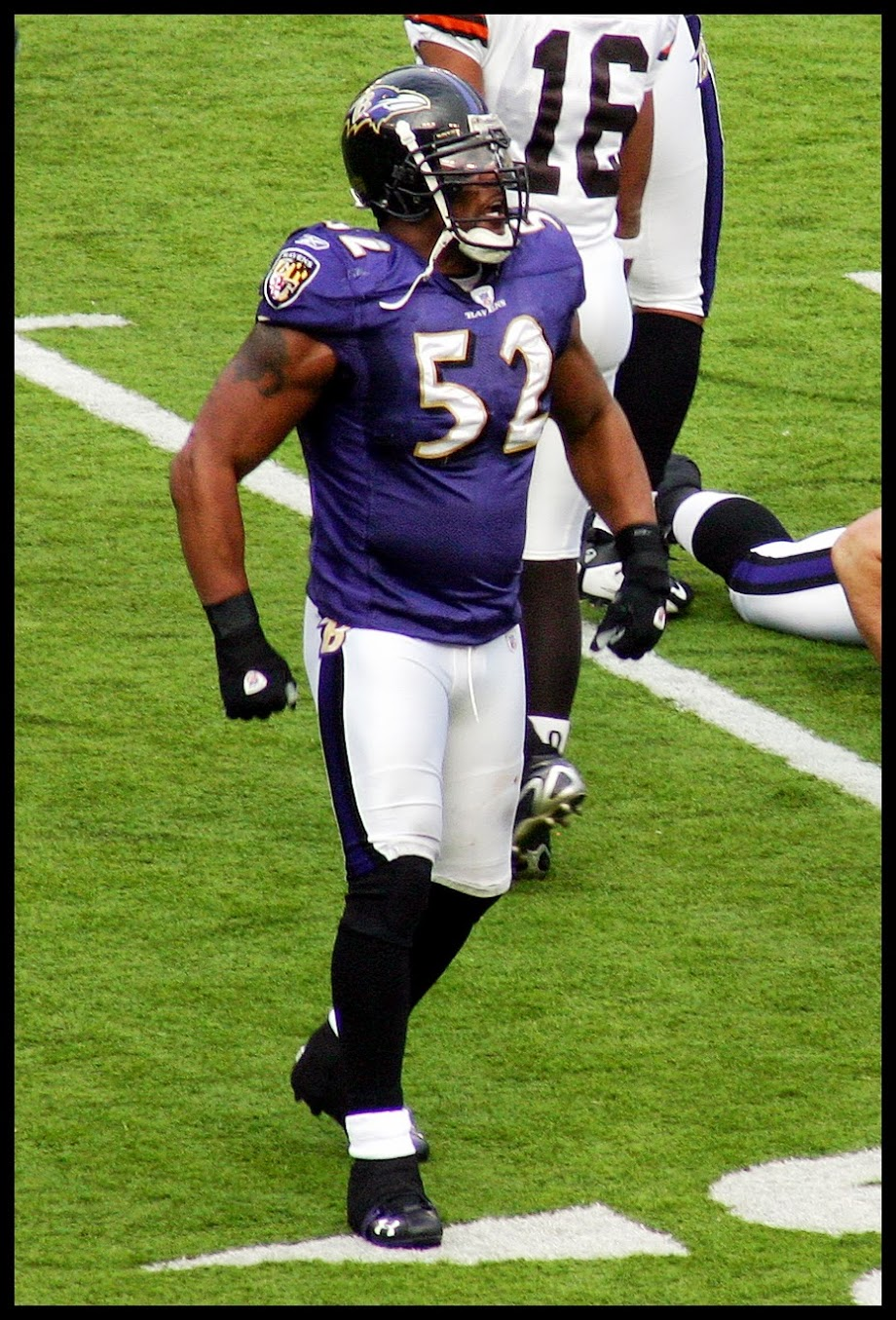
Regarded as one of the greatest linebackers of all time. Ray Lewis, selected 26th overall by the Ravens, was a 2-time Super Bowl champion, 2-time Defensive Player of the Year Award.

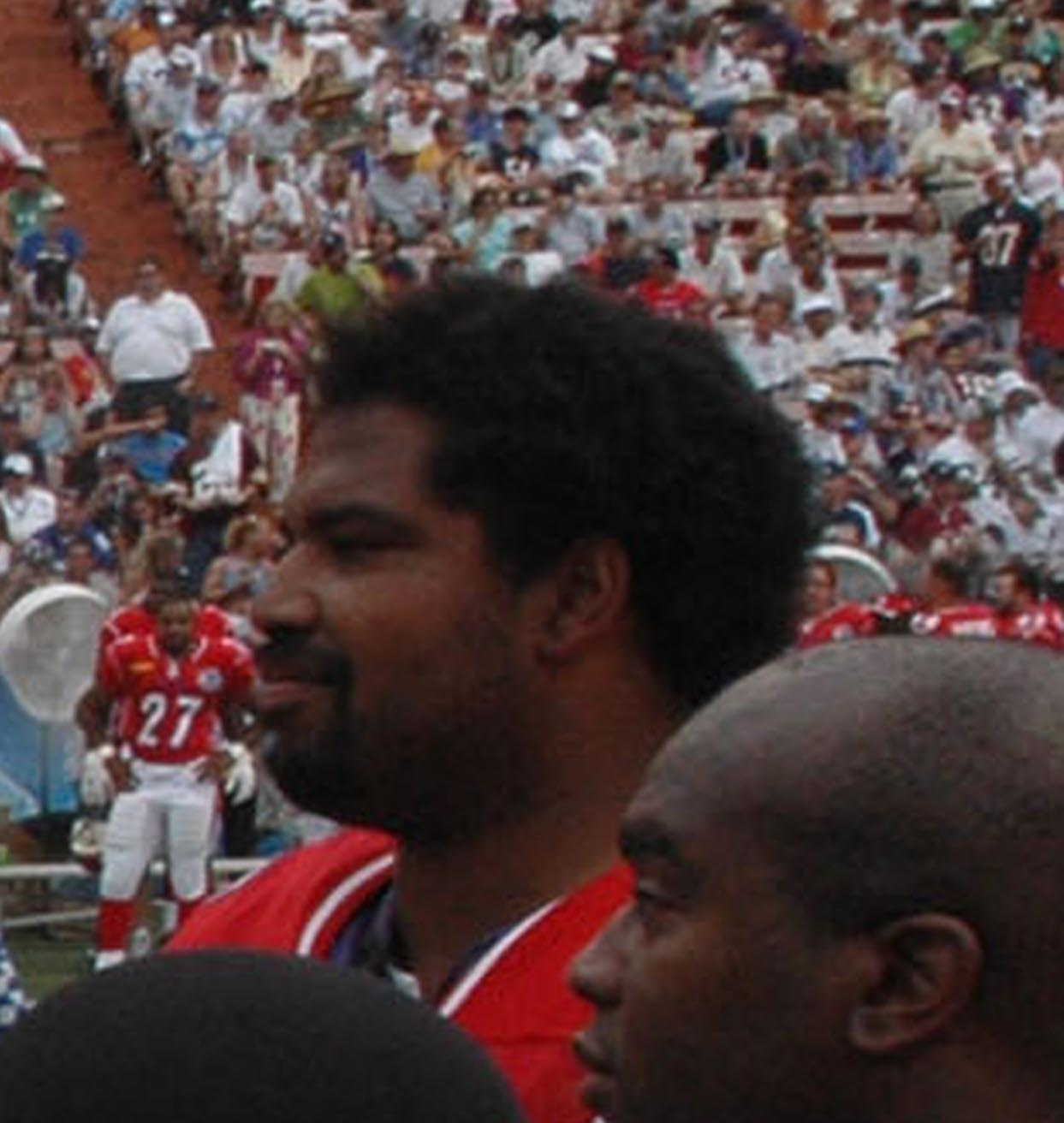
Jonathan Ogden, selected fourth overall by the Ravens, and the first draft selection ever for the Ravens, was a 11-time Pro Bowler, 9-time All-Pro and Super Bowl champion.

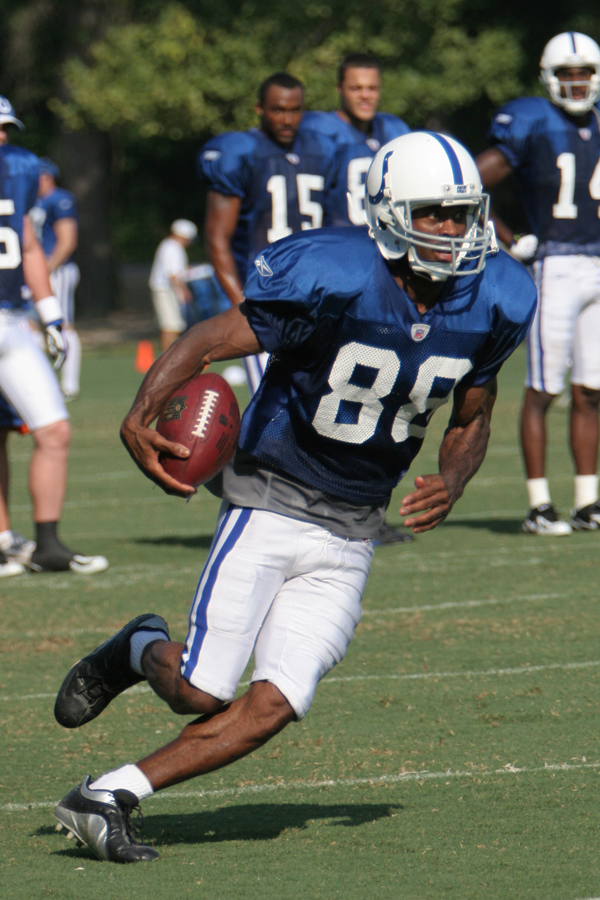
Marvin Harrison, selected 19th overall by Indianapolis Colts, led the league in receiving yards and receptions twice, was named to 8 Pro Bowls, and is considered one of the best wide receivers of his generation.

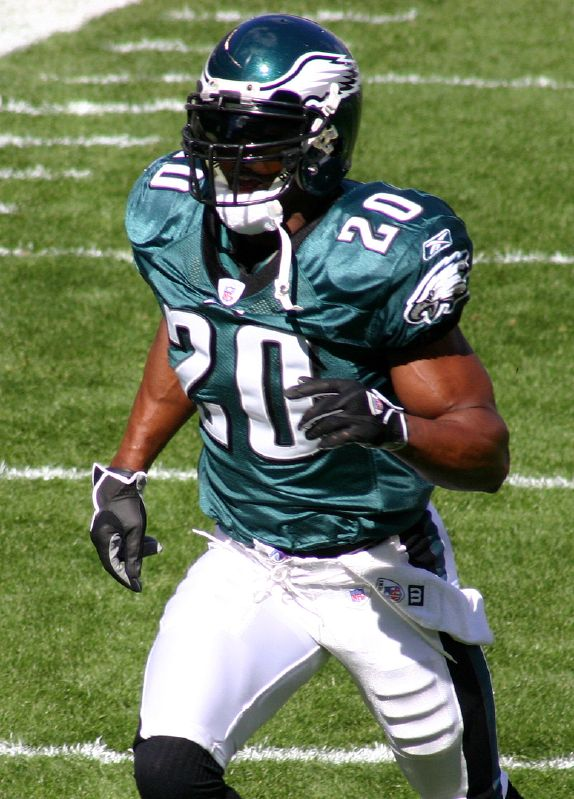
Brian Dawkins, selected 61st overall by Philadelphia, holds the record for most forced fumbles for a safety and was named to 9 Pro Bowls.

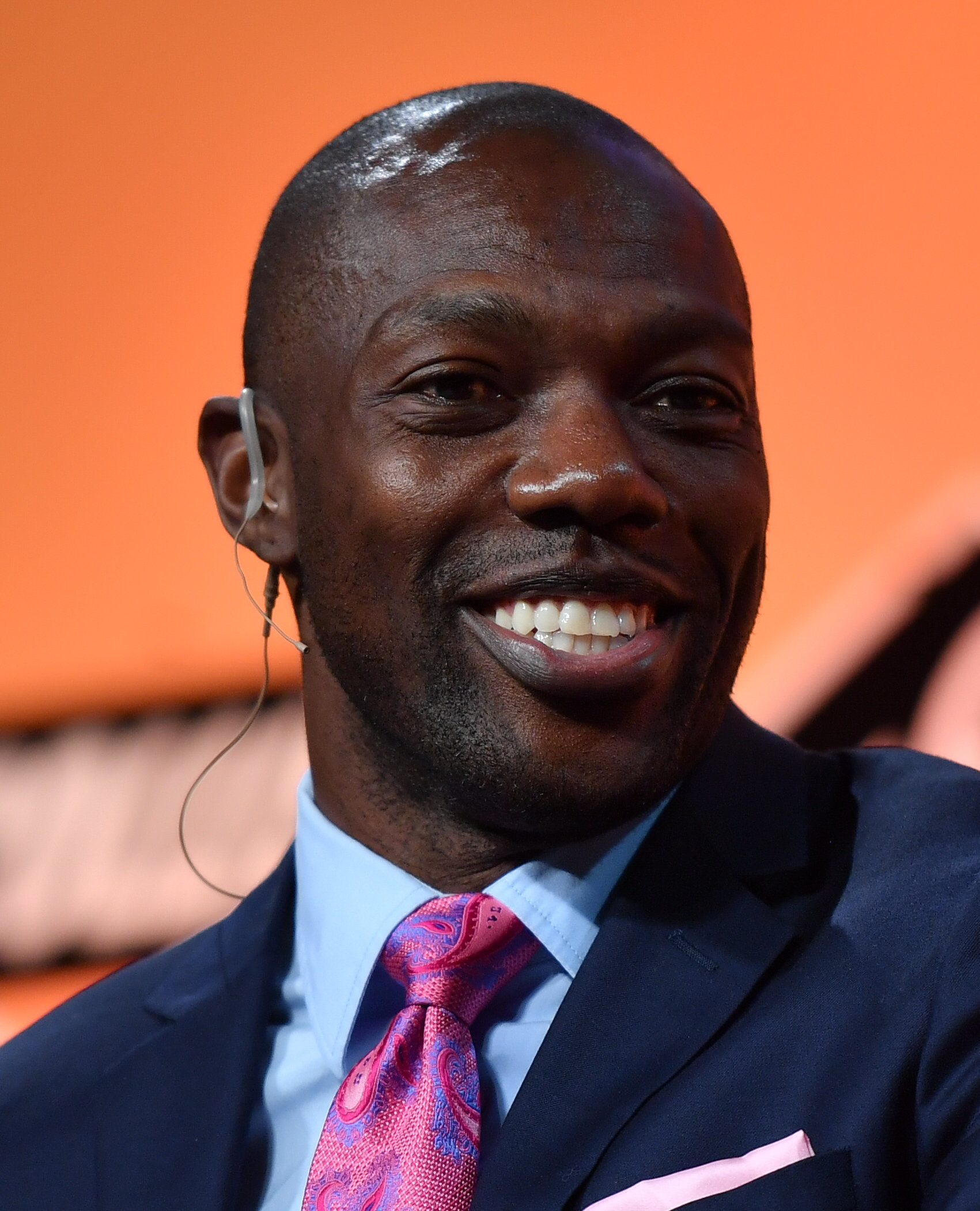
A third-round pick, Terrell Owens, selected 89th overall by San Francisco, broke multiple receiving records and was a fan favorite.

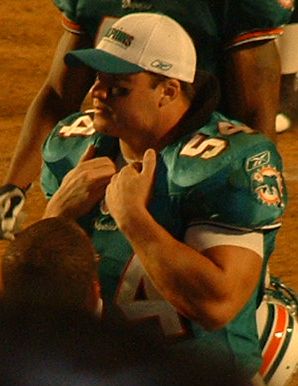
Zach Thomas, selected in the 5th round as the 154th overall selection by Miami, would go on to be selected to seven Pro Bowls, and seven 1st or 2nd Team All-Pro selections, during his tenure with the Dolphins

| Rnd. | Pick | Team | Player | Pos. | College | Notes |
|---|---|---|---|---|---|---|
| 1 | 1 | New York Jets | Keyshawn Johnson ^{†} | WR | USC | |
| 1 | 2 | Jacksonville Jaguars | Kevin Hardy ^{†} | LB | Illinois | |
| 1 | 3 | Arizona Cardinals | Simeon Rice ^{†} | DE | Illinois | |
| 1 | 4 | Baltimore Ravens | Jonathan Ogden^{‡}^{†} | T | UCLA | |
| 1 | 5 | New York Giants | Cedric Jones | DE | Oklahoma | |
| 1 | 6 | St. Louis Rams | Lawrence Phillips | RB | Nebraska | from Washington (Note: No. 6: Washington → St. Louis (PD). Washington traded a first-round selection (6th overall) to St. Louis in exchange for DT Sean Gilbert.) |
| 1 | 7 | New England Patriots | Terry Glenn ^{†} | WR | Ohio State | |
| 1 | 8 | Carolina Panthers | Tim Biakabutuka | RB | Michigan | |
| 1 | 9 | Oakland Raiders | Rickey Dudley | TE | Ohio State | from Houston (Note: No. 9: Houston → Oakland (D). Houston traded a first-round selection (9th overall) to Oakland in exchange for first-, second- and fourth-round selections (17th, 48th and 109th overall).) |
| 1 | 10 | Cincinnati Bengals | Willie Anderson ^{†} | T | Auburn | |
| 1 | 11 | New Orleans Saints | Alex Molden | CB | Oregon | |
| 1 | 12 | Tampa Bay Buccaneers | Regan Upshaw | DE | California | |
| 1 | 13 | Chicago Bears | Walt Harris ^{†} | CB | Mississippi State | from St. Louis (Note: No. 13: St. Louis → Chicago (D). St. Louis traded a first-round selection (13th overall) to Chicago in exchange for first-, third- and sixth-round selections (18th, 83rd and 201st overall).) |
| 1 | 14 | Houston Oilers | Eddie George ^{†} | RB | Ohio State | from Seattle (Note: No. 14: Seattle → Houston (D). Seattle traded a first-round selection (14th overall) to Houston in exchange for a first-round selection (17th overall) and DT Glenn Montgomery.) |
| 1 | 15 | Denver Broncos | John Mobley | LB | Kutztown | |
| 1 | 16 | Minnesota Vikings | Duane Clemons | DE | California | |
| 1 | 17 | Detroit Lions | Reggie Brown | LB | Texas A&M | from Oakland via Houston and Seattle (Note: No. 17: Oakland → Houston → Seattle → Detroit. Multiple trades: Oakland → Houston (D). See Round 1: Houston → Oakland. Houston → Seattle (D). See Round 1: Seattle → Houston. Seattle → Detroit (D). Seattle traded a first-round selection (17th overall) to Detroit in exchange for first- and third-round selections (21st and 91st overall).) |
| 1 | 18 | St. Louis Rams | Eddie Kennison | WR | LSU | from Chicago (Note: No. 18: Chicago → St. Louis (D). See Round 1: St. Louis → Chicago.) |
| 1 | 19 | Indianapolis Colts | Marvin Harrison^{‡}^{†} | WR | Syracuse | from Atlanta (Note: No. 19: Atlanta → Indianapolis (PD). Atlanta traded a first-round selection (19th overall) and 1994 first- and third-round selections to Indianapolis in exchange for QB Jeff George.) |
| 1 | 20 | Miami Dolphins | Daryl Gardener | DT | Baylor | |
| 1 | 21 | Seattle Seahawks | Pete Kendall | T | Boston College | from San Diego via Detroit (Note: No. 21: San Diego → Detroit → Seattle. Multiple trades: San Diego → Detroit (PD). San Diego traded a first-round selection (21st overall) to Detroit in exchange for a 1995 second-round selection. Detroit → Seattle (D). See Round 1: Seattle → Detroit.) |
| 1 | 22 | Tampa Bay Buccaneers | Marcus Jones | DE | North Carolina | from Indianapolis (Note: No. 22: Indianapolis → Tampa Bay (PD). Indianapolis traded a first-round selection (22nd overall) to Tampa Bay in exchange for QB Craig Erickson.) |
| 1 | 23 | Detroit Lions | Jeff Hartings ^{†} | G | Penn State | |
| 1 | 24 | Buffalo Bills | Eric Moulds ^{†} | WR | Mississippi State | |
| 1 | 25 | Philadelphia Eagles | Jermane Mayberry ^{†} | T | Texas A&M–Kingsville | |
| 1 | 26 | Baltimore Ravens | Ray Lewis^{‡}^{†} | LB | Miami (FL) | from San Francisco (Note: No. 26: San Francisco → Baltimore (PD). San Francisco traded a first-round selection (26th overall) and 1995 first-, third- and fourth-round selections to Cleveland in exchange for a 1995 first-round selection. This pick was inherited by Baltimore after the Browns' relocation there.) |
| 1 | 27 | Green Bay Packers | John Michels | T | USC | |
| 1 | 28 | Kansas City Chiefs | Jerome Woods ^{†} | S | Memphis | |
| 1 | 29 | Pittsburgh Steelers | Jamain Stephens | T | North Carolina A&T | |
| 1 | 30 | Washington Redskins | Andre Johnson | T | Penn State | from Dallas (Note: No. 30: Dallas → Washington (D). Dallas traded a first-round selection (30th overall) to Washington in exchange for second- and third-round selections (37th and 67th overall).) |
| 2 | 31 | New York Jets | Alex Van Dyke | WR | Nevada | |
| 2 | 32 | Arizona Cardinals | Leeland McElroy | RB | Texas A&M | |
| 2 | 33 | Jacksonville Jaguars | Tony Brackens ^{†} | DE | Texas | |
| 2 | 34 | New York Giants | Amani Toomer | WR | Michigan | |
| 2 | 35 | Tampa Bay Buccaneers | Mike Alstott ^{†} | FB | Purdue | from Baltimore (Note: No. 35: Baltimore → Tampa Bay (PD). Baltimore traded a second-round selection (35th overall) to Tampa Bay in exchange for TE Harold Bishop.) |
| 2 | 36 | New England Patriots | Lawyer Milloy ^{†} | S | Washington | |
| 2 | 37 | Dallas Cowboys | Kavika Pittman | DE | McNeese State | from Washington (Note: No. 37: Washington → Dallas (D). See Round 1: Dallas → Washington.) |
| 2 | 38 | Houston Oilers | Bryant Mix | DE | Alcorn State | |
| 2 | 39 | Cincinnati Bengals | Marco Battaglia | TE | Rutgers | |
| 2 | 40 | New Orleans Saints | Je'Rod Cherry | S | California | |
| 2 | 41 | San Diego Chargers | Bryan Still | WR | Virginia Tech | from Tampa Bay (Note: No. 41: Tampa Bay → San Diego (D). Tampa Bay traded a second-round selection (41st overall) to San Diego in exchange for a 1997 first-round selection.) |
| 2 | 42 | St. Louis Rams | Tony Banks | QB | Michigan State | |
| 2 | 43 | Carolina Panthers | Muhsin Muhammad ^{†} | WR | Michigan State | |
| 2 | 44 | Denver Broncos | Tory James ^{†} | CB | LSU | |
| 2 | 45 | Minnesota Vikings | James Manley | DT | Vanderbilt | |
| 2 | 46 | San Francisco 49ers | Israel Ifeanyi | DE | USC | from Oakland (Note: No. 46: Oakland → San Francisco (PD). Oakland traded a second-round selection (46th overall) to San Francisco in exchange for second- and fourth-round selections (57th and 124th overall).) |
| 2 | 47 | Seattle Seahawks | Fred Thomas | CB | Tennessee–Martin | |
| 2 | 48 | Houston Oilers | Jason Layman | T | Tennessee | from Atlanta via Oakland (Note: No. 48: Atlanta → Oakland → Houston. Multiple trades: Atlanta → Oakland (PD). Atlanta traded a second-round selection (48th overall) to Oakland in exchange for S Patrick Bates. Oakland → Houston (D). See Round 1: Houston → Oakland.) |
| 2 | 49 | Dallas Cowboys | Randall Godfrey | LB | Georgia | from Miami (Note: No. 49: Miami → Dallas (D). Miami traded a second-round selection (49th overall) to Dallas in exchange for second- and fourth-round selections (60th and 99th overall).) |
| 2 | 50 | San Diego Chargers | Patrick Sapp | LB | Clemson | |
| 2 | 51 | Indianapolis Colts | Dedric Mathis | CB | Houston | |
| 2 | 52 | Chicago Bears | Bobby Engram | WR | Penn State | |
| 2 | 53 | Buffalo Bills | Gabe Northern | DE | LSU | |
| 2 | 54 | Philadelphia Eagles | Jason Dunn | TE | Eastern Kentucky | |
| 2 | 55 | Baltimore Ravens | DeRon Jenkins | CB | Tennessee | from Detroit via Denver (Note: No. 55: Detroit → Denver → Baltimore. Multiple trades: Detroit → Denver (PD). Detroit traded second- and seventh-round selections (55th and 236th overall) to Denver in exchange for RB Glyn Milburn. Denver → Baltimore (D). Denver traded a second-round selection (55th overall) to Baltimore in exchange for third-, fourth- and seventh-round selections (65th, 100th and 213th overall).) |
| 2 | 56 | Green Bay Packers | Derrick Mayes | WR | Notre Dame | |
| 2 | 57 | Oakland Raiders | Lance Johnstone | DE | Temple | from San Francisco via Oakland and New England (Note: No. 57: San Francisco → Oakland → New England → Oakland. Multiple trades: San Francisco → Oakland (PD). See Round 2: Oakland → San Francisco. Oakland → New England (PD). Oakland traded a second-round selection (57th overall) to New England in exchange for OT Pat Harlow. New England → Oakland (D). New England traded a second-round selection (57th overall) to Oakland in exchange for third-, fourth- and fifth-round selections (76th, 124th and 149th overall).) |
| 2 | 58 | Kansas City Chiefs | Reggie Tongue | S | Oregon State | |
| 2 | 59 | St. Louis Rams | Ernie Conwell | TE | Washington | from Pittsburgh (Note: No. 59: Pittsburgh → St. Louis (PD). Pittsburgh traded a second-round selection (59th overall) and a 1997 fourth-round selection to St. Louis in exchange for a third-round selection (72nd overall) and RB Jerome Bettis.) |
| 2 | 60 | Jacksonville Jaguars | Michael Cheever | C | Georgia Tech | from Dallas via Miami. (Note: No. 60: Dallas → Miami → Jacksonville. Multiple trades: Dallas → Miami (D). See Round 2: Miami → Dallas. Miami → Jacksonville (D). Miami traded second- and fourth-round selections (60th and 99th overall) to Jacksonville in exchange for a third-round selection, two fourth-round selections and a fifth-round selection (79th, 98th, 134th and 150th overall).) |
| 2* | 61 | Philadelphia Eagles | Brian Dawkins^{‡}^{†} | S | Clemson | |
| 3 | 62 | New York Jets | Ray Mickens | CB | Texas A&M | |
| 3 | 63 | Jacksonville Jaguars | Aaron Beasley | CB | West Virginia | |
| 3 | 64 | Arizona Cardinals | Johnny McWilliams | TE | USC | |
| 3 | 65 | Denver Broncos | Detron Smith ^{†} | RB | Texas A&M | from Baltimore (Note: No. 65: Baltimore → Denver (D). See Round 2: Denver → Baltimore.) |
| 3 | 66 | New York Giants | Roman Oben | T | Louisville | |
| 3 | 67 | Dallas Cowboys | Clay Shiver | C | Florida State | from Washington (Note: No. 67: Washington → Dallas (D). See Round 1: Dallas → Washington.) |
| 3 | 68 | Kansas City Chiefs | John Browning | DT | West Virginia | from New England (Note: No. 68: New England → Kansas City (PD). New England traded a third-round selection (68th overall) to Kansas City in exchange for a 1995 fourth-round selection.) |
| 3 | 69 | Cincinnati Bengals | Ken Blackman | G | Illinois | |
| 3 | 70 | New Orleans Saints | Brady Smith | DE | Colorado State | |
| 3 | 71 | Tampa Bay Buccaneers | Donnie Abraham ^{†} | CB | East Tennessee State | |
| 3 | 72 | Pittsburgh Steelers | Steve Conley | LB | Arkansas | from St. Louis (Note: No. 72: St. Louis → Pittsburgh (PD). See Round 2: Pittsburgh → St. Louis.) |
| 3 | 73 | Carolina Panthers | Winslow Oliver | RB | New Mexico | |
| 3 | 74 | Houston Oilers | Terry Killens | LB | Penn State | |
| 3 | 75 | Minnesota Vikings | Moe Williams | RB | Kentucky | |
| 3 | 76 | Detroit Lions | Ryan Stewart | S | Georgia Tech | from Oakland via New England (Note: No. 76: Oakland → New England → Detroit. Multiple trades: Oakland → New England (D). See Round 2: New England → Oakland. New England → Detroit (D). New England traded a third-round selection (76th overall) to Detroit in exchange for third-, fourth- and sixth-round selections (86th, 119th and 195th overall).) |
| 3 | 77 | Seattle Seahawks | Robert Barr | T | Rutgers | |
| 3 | 78 | Denver Broncos | Mark Campbell | DT | Florida | |
| 3¤ | 79 | Miami Dolphins | Dorian Brew | CB | Kansas | from Jacksonville (Note: No. 79: Jacksonville → Miami (D). See Round 2: Miami → Jacksonville.) |
| 3 | 80 | Miami Dolphins | Abdul-Karim al-Jabbar | RB | UCLA | |
| 3 | 81 | San Diego Chargers | Brian Roche | TE | San Jose State | |
| 3 | 82 | Indianapolis Colts | Scott Slutzker | TE | Iowa | |
| 3 | 83 | St. Louis Rams | Jerald Moore | RB | Oklahoma | from Chicago (Note: No. 83: Chicago → St. Louis (D). See Round 1: St. Louis → Chicago.) |
| 3 | 84 | Atlanta Falcons | Shannon Brown | DT | Alabama | |
| 3 | 85 | Philadelphia Eagles | Bobby Hoying | QB | Ohio State | |
| 3 | 86 | New England Patriots | Tedy Bruschi ^{†} | LB | Arizona | from Detroit (Note: No. 86: Detroit → New England (D). See Round 3: New England → Detroit.) |
| 3 | 87 | Buffalo Bills | Matt Stevens | S | Appalachian State | |
| 3¤ | 88 | Carolina Panthers | J. C. Price | DT | Virginia Tech | |
| 3 | 89 | San Francisco 49ers | Terrell Owens^{‡}^{†} | WR | Chattanooga | |
| 3 | 90 | Green Bay Packers | Mike Flanagan ^{†} | C | UCLA | |
| 3 | 91 | Seattle Seahawks | Reggie Brown | RB | Fresno State | from Kansas City and Detroit (Note: No. 91: Kansas City → Detroit → Seattle. Multiple trades: Kansas City → Detroit (D). Kansas City traded a third-round selection (91st overall) to Detroit in exchange for S William White. Detroit → Seattle (D). See Round 1: Seattle → Detroit.) |
| 3 | 92 | Pittsburgh Steelers | Jon Witman | FB | Penn State | |
| 3 | – | Dallas Cowboys | Selection forfeited during the 1995 supplemental draft. (Note: Dallas forfeited a third-round selection after selecting DT Darren Benson in the third round of the 1995 supplemental draft.) | | | |
| 3* | 93 | Green Bay Packers | Tyrone Williams | CB | Nebraska | |
| 3* | 94 | Dallas Cowboys | Stepfret Williams | WR | Northeast Louisiana | |
| 3* | 95 | Dallas Cowboys | Mike Ulufale | DE | BYU | |
| 4 | 96 | Tampa Bay Buccaneers | Jason Odom | T | Florida | from NY Jets (Note: No. 96: NY Jets → Tampa Bay (PD). The NY Jets traded a fourth-round selection (96th overall) to Tampa Bay in exchange for DT Marc Spindler.) |
| 4 | 97 | Minnesota Vikings | Hunter Goodwin | G | Texas A&M | from Arizona (Note: No. 97: Arizona → Minnesota (D). Arizona traded a fourth-round selection (97th overall) to Minnesota in exchange for fourth- and fifth-round selections (112th and 137th overall).) |
| 4 | 98 | Kansas City Chiefs | Donnie Edwards ^{†} | LB | UCLA | from Jacksonville via Miami (Note: No. 98: Jacksonville → Miami → Kansas City. Multiple trades: Jacksonville → Miami (D). See Round 2: Miami → Jacksonville. Miami → Kansas City (D). Miami traded a fourth-round selection (98th overall) and a 1997 seventh-round selection to Kansas City in exchange for two fourth-round selections (113th and 125th overall).) |
| 4 | 99 | Seattle Seahawks | Phillip Daniels | DE | Georgia | from NY Giants via Dallas, Miami and Jacksonville (Note: No. 99: NY Giants → Dallas → Miami → Jacksonville → Seattle. Multiple trades: NY Giants → Dallas (PD). The NY Giants sent a fourth-round selection (99th overall) to Dallas as compensation for signing restricted free agent G Ron Stone. Dallas → Miami (D). See Round 2: Miami → Dallas. Miami → Jacksonville (D). See Round 2: Miami → Jacksonville. Jacksonville → Seattle (D). Jacksonville traded a fourth-round selection (99th overall) to Seattle in exchange for fourth- and fifth-round selections (110th and 146th overall).) |
| 4 | 100 | Denver Broncos | Jeff Lewis | QB | Northern Arizona | from Baltimore (Note: No. 100: Baltimore → Denver (D). See Round 2: Denver → Baltimore.) |
| 4 | 101 | New England Patriots | Heath Irwin | G | Colorado | |
| 4 | 102 | Washington Redskins | Stephen Davis ^{†} | RB | Auburn | |
| 4 | 103 | New Orleans Saints | Ricky Whittle | RB | Oregon | |
| 4 | 104 | Tampa Bay Buccaneers | Eric Austin | S | Jackson State | |
| 4 | 105 | St. Louis Rams | Percell Gaskins | LB | Kansas State | |
| 4 | 106 | Carolina Panthers | Norberto Davidds-Garrido | T | USC | |
| 4 | 107 | Houston Oilers | Kendrick Burton | DE | Alabama | |
| 4 | 108 | Cincinnati Bengals | Jevon Langford | DE | Oklahoma State | |
| 4 | 109 | Houston Oilers | Jon Runyan ^{†} | T | Michigan | from Oakland (Note: No. 109: Oakland → Houston (D). See Round 1: Houston → Oakland.) |
| 4 | 110 | Jacksonville Jaguars | Reggie Barlow | WR | Alabama State | from Seattle (Note: No. 110: Seattle → Jacksonville (D). See Round 4: Jacksonville → Seattle.) |
| 4 | 111 | Carolina Panthers | Emmanuel McDaniel | CB | East Carolina | from Denver (Note: No. 111: Denver → Carolina (D). Denver traded a fourth-round selection (111th overall) to Carolina in exchange for fourth-, fifth- and seventh-round selections (122nd, 159th and 235th overall).) |
| 4 | 112 | Arizona Cardinals | Aaron Graham | C | Nebraska | from Minnesota (Note: No. 112: Minnesota → Arizona (D). See Round 4: Arizona → Minnesota.) |
| 4¤ | 113 | Miami Dolphins | Kirk Pointer | CB | Austin Peay | from Jacksonville via Kansas City (Note: No. 113: Jacksonville → Kansas City → Miami. Multiple trades: Jacksonville → Kansas City (PD). Jacksonville traded a fourth-round selection (113th overall) and 1995 first-, third- and fourth-round selections to Kansas City in exchange for a 1995 first-round selection. Kansas City → Miami (D). See Round 4: Miami → Kansas City.) |
| 4 | 114 | San Diego Chargers | Charlie Jones | WR | Fresno State | |
| 4 | 115 | Indianapolis Colts | Brian Milne | RB | Penn State | |
| 4 | 116 | Chicago Bears | Paul Grasmanis | DT | Notre Dame | |
| 4 | 117 | Atlanta Falcons | Richard Huntley | RB | Winston-Salem State | |
| 4 | 118 | Miami Dolphins | Stanley Pritchett | FB | South Carolina | |
| 4 | 119 | New England Patriots | Chris Sullivan | DT | Boston College | from Detroit (Note: No. 119: Detroit → New England (D). See Round 3: New England → Detroit.) |
| 4 | 120 | Buffalo Bills | Sean Moran | DE | Colorado State | |
| 4 | 121 | Philadelphia Eagles | Ray Farmer | LB | Duke | |
| 4¤ | 122 | Denver Broncos | Darrius Johnson | CB | Oklahoma | from Carolina (Note: No. 122: Denver → Carolina (D) See Round 4: Denver → Carolina.) |
| 4 | 123 | Green Bay Packers | Chris Darkins | RB | Minnesota | |
| 4 | 124 | New England Patriots | Kantroy Barber | RB | West Virginia | from San Francisco via Oakland (Note: No. 124: San Francisco → Oakland → New England. Multiple trades: San Francisco → Oakland (PD). See Round 2: Oakland → San Francisco. Oakland → New England (D). See Round 2: New England → Oakland.) |
| 4 | 125 | Miami Dolphins | LaCurtis Jones | LB | Baylor | from Kansas City (Note: No. 125: Kansas City → Miami (D). See Round 4: Miami → Kansas City.) |
| 4 | 126 | Pittsburgh Steelers | Earl Holmes | LB | Florida A&M | |
| 4 | 127 | Atlanta Falcons | Juran Bolden | CB | Mississippi Delta CC | from Dallas (Note: No. 127: Dallas → Carolina (PD). Dallas traded fourth- and fifth-round selections (127th and 164th overall) to Atlanta in exchange for S Roger Harper.) |
| 4* | 128 | San Francisco 49ers | Daryl Price | LB | Colorado | |
| 4* | 129 | Detroit Lions | Brad Ford | DB | Alabama | |
| 4* | 130 | New York Giants | Danny Kanell | QB | Florida State | |
| 4* | 131 | Seattle Seahawks | Eric Unverzagt | LB | Wisconsin | |
| 4* | 132 | Pittsburgh Steelers | Jahine Arnold | WR | Fresno State | |
| 5 | 133 | New York Jets | Marcus Coleman | CB | Texas Tech | |
| 5 | 134 | Miami Dolphins | Jerris McPhail | RB | East Carolina | from Jacksonville (Note: No. 134: Jacksonville → Miami (D). See Round 2: Miami → Jacksonville.) |
| 5 | 135 | Kansas City Chiefs | Joe Horn ^{†} | WR | Itawamba CC | from Arizona (Note: No. 135: Arizona → Kansas City (D). Arizona traded a fifth-round selection (135th overall) to Kansas City in exchange for two fifth-round selections (161st and 162nd overall).) |
| 5 | 136 | New Orleans Saints | Mercury Hayes | WR | Michigan | from Baltimore (Note: No. 136: Baltimore → New Orleans (PD). Baltimore traded a fifth-round selection (136th overall) to New Orleans in exchange for CB Reggie Jones.) |
| 5 | 137 | Arizona Cardinals | James Dexter | T | South Carolina | from NY Giants via Minnesota (Note: No. 137: NY Giants → Minnesota → Arizona. Multiple trades: NY Giants → Minnesota (PD). The NY Giants traded a fifth-round selection (137th overall) and a 1995 sixth-round selection to Minnesota in exchange for a sixth-round selection (182nd overall) and S Vencie Glenn. Minnesota → Arizona (D). See Round 4: Arizona → Minnesota.) |
| 5 | 138 | Washington Redskins | Leomont Evans | S | Clemson | |
| 5 | 139 | New England Patriots | John Elmore | G | Texas | |
| 5 | 140 | Tampa Bay Buccaneers | Jason Maniecki | DT | Wisconsin | |
| 5 | 141 | St. Louis Rams | Fred Miller | T | Baylor | |
| 5 | 142 | Carolina Panthers | Marquette Smith | RB | Central Florida | |
| 5 | 143 | Houston Oilers | Rayna Stewart | S | Northern Arizona | |
| 5 | 144 | Cincinnati Bengals | Greg Myers | S | Colorado State | |
| 5 | 145 | New Orleans Saints | Tom Ackerman | G | Eastern Washington | |
| 5 | 146 | Jacksonville Jaguars | Jimmy Herndon | G | Houston | from Seattle (Note: No. 146: Seattle → Jacksonville (D). See Round 4: Jacksonville → Seattle.) |
| 5 | 147 | Philadelphia Eagles | Whit Marshall | LB | Georgia | from Denver (Note: No. 147: Denver → Philadelphia (PD). Denver traded a fifth-round selection (147th overall) to Philadelphia in exchange for CB Ben Smith.) |
| 5 | 148 | Minnesota Vikings | Sean Boyd | DB | North Carolina | |
| 5 | 149 | New England Patriots | Christian Peter | DT | Nebraska | from Oakland (Note: No. 149: Oakland → New England (D). See Round 2: New England → Oakland.) |
| 5¤ | 150 | Miami Dolphins | Shane Burton | DT | Tennessee | from Jacksonville (Note: No. 150: Jacksonville → Miami (D). See Round 2: Miami → Jacksonville.) |
| 5 | 151 | Indianapolis Colts | Steve Martin | DT | Missouri | |
| 5 | 152 | Chicago Bears | Chris Villarrial | G | IUP | |
| 5 | 153 | Baltimore Ravens | Jermaine Lewis ^{†} | WR | Maryland | from Atlanta (Note: No. 153: Atlanta → Baltimore (PD). Atlanta traded a fifth-round selection (153rd overall) to Baltimore in exchange for G Gene Williams.) |
| 5 | 154 | Miami Dolphins | Zach Thomas^{‡}^{†} | LB | Texas Tech | |
| 5 | 155 | San Diego Chargers | Junior Soli | DT | Arkansas | |
| 5 | 156 | Buffalo Bills | Raymond Jackson | DB | Colorado State | |
| 5 | 157 | Dallas Cowboys | Kenneth McDaniel | DB | Norfolk State | from Philadelphia via Baltimore (Note: No. 157: Philadelphia → Baltimore → Dallas. Multiple trades: Philadelphia → Baltimore (PD). Philadelphia traded a fifth-round selection (157th overall) and a 1995 fifth-round selection to Cleveland in exchange for a 1995 fourth-round selection. This pick was inherited by Baltimore after the Browns' relocation there. Baltimore → Dallas (D). Baltimore traded a fifth-round selection (157th overall) to Dallas in exchange for a 1997 fourth-round selection.) |
| 5 | 158 | Detroit Lions | Kerwin Waldroup | DT | Central State | |
| 5¤ | 159 | Denver Broncos | Patrick Jeffers | WR | Virginia | from Carolina (Note: No. 159: Denver → Carolina (D) See Round 4: Denver → Carolina.) |
| 5 | 160 | San Francisco 49ers | Iheanyi Uwaezuoke | WR | California | |
| 5 | 161 | Arizona Cardinals | Harry Stamps | T | Oklahoma | from Green Bay via Kansas City (Note: No. 161: Green Bay → Kansas City → Arizona. Multiple trades: Green Bay → Kansas City (PD). Green Bay traded a fifth-round selection (161st overall) to Kansas City in exchange for G Lindsay Knapp. Kansas City → Arizona (D). See Round 5: Arizona → Kansas City.) |
| 5 | 162 | Arizona Cardinals | Dell McGee | DB | Auburn | from Kansas City (Note: No. 162: Kansas City → Arizona (D) See Round 5: Arizona → Kansas City.) |
| 5 | 163 | Pittsburgh Steelers | Israel Rayborn | DE | North Alabama | |
| 5 | 164 | Atlanta Falcons | Gary Bandy | LB | Baylor | from Dallas (Note: No. 164: Dallas → Atlanta (PD) See Round 4: Dallas → Atlanta.) |
| 5* | 165 | New Orleans Saints | Terry Guess | WR | Gardner–Webb | |
| 5* | 166 | Oakland Raiders | La'Roi Glover ^{†} | DT | San Diego State | |
| 5* | 167 | Dallas Cowboys | Alan Campos | LB | Louisville | |
| 6 | 168 | New York Jets | Hugh Hunter | DE | Hampton | |
| 6 | 169 | Arizona Cardinals | Mike Foley | DE | New Hampshire | |
| 6 | 170 | Jacksonville Jaguars | John Fisher | DB | Missouri Western State | |
| 6 | 171 | New York Giants | Doug Colman | LB | Nebraska | |
| 6 | 172 | Baltimore Ravens | Dexter Daniels | LB | Florida | |
| 6 | 173 | New England Patriots | Chris Griffin | TE | New Mexico | |
| 6 | 174 | Washington Redskins | Kelvin Kinney | DE | Virginia State | |
| 6 | 175 | St. Louis Rams | Derrick Harris | RB | Miami (FL) | |
| 6 | 176 | Kansas City Chiefs | Dietrich Jells | WR | Pittsburgh | from Carolina (Note: No. 176: Carolina → Kansas City (PD). Carolina traded a sixth-round selection (176th overall) to Kansas City in exchange for a 1995 sixth-round selection.) |
| 6 | 177 | Houston Oilers | Anthony Dorsett | S | Pittsburgh | |
| 6 | 178 | Cincinnati Bengals | Tom Tumulty | LB | Pittsburgh | |
| 6 | 179 | New Orleans Saints | Keno Hills | T | Southwestern Louisiana | |
| 6 | 180 | Tampa Bay Buccaneers | Nilo Silvan | WR | Tennessee | |
| 6 | 181 | Denver Broncos | Tony Veland | S | Nebraska | |
| 6 | 182 | New York Giants | Scott Galyon | LB | Tennessee | from Vikings (Note: No. 182: Minnesota → NY Giants (PD). See Round 5: NY Giants → Minnesota.) |
| 6 | 183 | Oakland Raiders | Tim Hall | RB | Robert Morris | |
| 6 | 184 | Seattle Seahawks | Reggie Green | G | Florida | |
| 6¤ | 185 | Jacksonville Jaguars | Chris Doering | WR | Florida | |
| 6¤ | 186 | Baltimore Ravens | James Roe | WR | Norfolk State | from Jacksonville (Note: No. 186: Jacksonville → Baltimore (PD). Jacksonville traded a sixth-round selection (186th overall) and a 1995 fifth-round selection to Cleveland in exchange for a 1995 fourth-round selection. This pick was inherited by Baltimore after the Browns' relocation there.) |
| 6 | 187 | Chicago Bears | Jon Clark | T | Temple | |
| 6 | 188 | Atlanta Falcons | Craig Sauer | LB | Minnesota | |
| 6 | 189 | Miami Dolphins | Shawn Wooden | S | Notre Dame | |
| 6 | 190 | San Diego Chargers | Jim Mills | T | Idaho | |
| 6 | 191 | Indianapolis Colts | Keith Conlin | T | Penn State | |
| 6¤ | 192 | San Diego Chargers | Bryan Stoltenberg | C | Colorado | from Carolina via Pittsburgh (Note: No. 192: Carolina → Pittsburgh → San Diego. Multiple trades: Carolina → Pittsburgh (PD). Carolina traded a sixth-round selection (192nd overall) to Pittsburgh in exchange for RB Barry Foster. Pittsburgh → San Diego (D). Pittsburgh traded a sixth-round selection (192nd overall) and a 1997 seventh-round selection to San Diego in exchange for a 1997 fifth-round selection.) |
| 6¤ | 193 | Carolina Panthers | Scott Greene | RB | Michigan State | |
| 6 | 194 | Philadelphia Eagles | Steve White | DE | Tennessee | |
| 6 | 195 | New England Patriots | Marrio Grier | RB | Chattanooga | from Detroit (Note: No. 195: Detroit → New England (D). See Round 3: New England → Detroit.) |
| 6 | 196 | Buffalo Bills | Leon Neal | RB | Washington | |
| 6 | 197 | Philadelphia Eagles | Tony Johnson | TE | Alabama | from Green Bay (Note: No. 197: Green Bay → Philadelphia (PD). Green Bay traded a sixth-round selection (197th overall) to Philadelphia in exchange for OL Joe Sims.) |
| 6 | 198 | San Francisco 49ers | Stephen Pitts | RB | Penn State | |
| 6 | 199 | Philadelphia Eagles | Phillip Riley | WR | Florida State | from Kansas City (Note: No. 199: Philadelphia → Kansas City (PD). Kansas City traded a sixth-round selection (197th overall) and a 1995 second-round selection to Philadelphia in exchange for a 1995 fourth-round selection and WR Victor Bailey.) |
| 6 | 200 | Pittsburgh Steelers | Orpheus Roye | DE | Florida State | |
| 6 | 201 | St. Louis Rams | Hayward Clay | TE | Texas A&M | from Dallas via Chicago (Note: No. 201: Dallas → Chicago → St. Louis. Multiple trades: Dallas → Chicago (PD). Dallas traded a sixth-round selection (201st overall) to Chicago in exchange for LB Jim Schwantz. Chicago → St. Louis (D). See Round 1: St. Louis → Chicago.) |
| 6* | 202 | Buffalo Bills | Dusty Zeigler | C | Notre Dame | |
| 6* | 203 | Pittsburgh Steelers | Spence Fischer | QB | Duke | |
| 6* | 204 | New Orleans Saints | Toderick Malone | WR | Alabama | |
| 6* | 205 | Indianapolis Colts | Mike Cawley | QB | James Madison | |
| 6* | 206 | New England Patriots | Devin Wyman | DE | Kentucky State | |
| 6* | 207 | Dallas Cowboys | Wendell Davis | CB | Oklahoma | |
| 6* | 208 | Green Bay Packers | Marco Rivera ^{†} | G | Penn State | |
| 6* | 209 | Seattle Seahawks | T.J. Cunningham | S | Colorado | |
| 7 | 210 | New York Jets | Chris Hayes | S | Washington State | |
| 7 | 211 | Kansas City Chiefs | Ben Lynch | C | California | from Jacksonville |
| 7 | 212 | Arizona Cardinals | Jarius Hayes | TE | North Alabama | |
| 7 | 213 | Denver Broncos | Leslie Ratliffe | T | Tennessee | from Baltimore (Note: No. 213: Baltimore → Denver (D). See Round 2: Denver → Baltimore.) |
| 7 | 214 | New York Giants | Conrad Hamilton | CB | Eastern New Mexico | |
| 7 | 215 | Washington Redskins | Jeremy Asher | LB | Oregon | |
| 7 | 216 | New England Patriots | Lovett Purnell | TE | West Virginia | |
| 7 | 217 | Carolina Panthers | Donnell Baker | WR | Southern | |
| 7 | 218 | Houston Oilers | Mike Archie | RB | Penn State | |
| 7 | 219 | Cincinnati Bengals | Rod Jones | T | Kansas | |
| 7 | 220 | Oakland Raiders | Sedric Clark | DE | Tulsa | from New Orleans (Note: No. 220: New Orleans → Oakland (PD). New Orleans traded a seventh-round selection (220th overall) to Oakland in exchange for DT Willie Broughton.) |
| 7 | 221 | Tampa Bay Buccaneers | Reggie Rusk | CB | Kentucky | |
| 7 | 222 | St. Louis Rams | Chuck Osborne | DT | Arizona | |
| 7 | 223 | Minnesota Vikings | Jon Merrill | T | Duke | |
| 7 | 224 | Oakland Raiders | Darius Smith | C | Sam Houston State | |
| 7 | 225 | Seattle Seahawks | Johnie Church | DE | Florida | |
| 7 | 226 | Denver Broncos | Chris Banks | G | Kansas | |
| 7¤ | 227 | Jacksonville Jaguars | Clarence Jones | WR | Tennessee State | |
| 7¤ | 228 | Jacksonville Jaguars | Gregory Spann | WR | Jackson State | |
| 7 | 229 | Atlanta Falcons | Ethan Brooks | DE | Williams | |
| 7 | 230 | Miami Dolphins | Jeff Buckey | G | Stanford | |
| 7 | 231 | San Diego Chargers | Freddie Bradley | RB | Sonoma State | |
| 7 | 232 | Indianapolis Colts | Adrian Robinson | CB | Baylor | |
| 7 | 233 | Chicago Bears | Marcus Keyes | DT | North Alabama | |
| 7¤ | 234 | Carolina Panthers | Kerry Hicks | DT | Colorado | |
| 7¤ | 235 | Denver Broncos | L. T. Levine | RB | Kansas | from Carolina (Note: No. 235: Carolina → Denver (D) See Round 4: Denver → Carolina.) |
| 7 | 236 | Denver Broncos | Brian Gragert | P | Wyoming | from Detroit (Note: No. 236: Detroit → Denver (PD). See Round 2: Detroit → Denver.) |
| 7 | 237 | Buffalo Bills | Dan Brandenburg | DE | Indiana State | |
| 7 | 238 | Baltimore Ravens | Jon Stark | QB | Trinity International (IL) | from Philadelphia (Note: No. 238: Philadelphia → Baltimore (PD). Philadelphia traded a seventh-round selection (238th overall) to Baltimore in exchange for DT Ronnie Dixon.) |
| 7 | 239 | San Francisco 49ers | Sean Manuel | TE | New Mexico State | |
| 7 | 240 | Green Bay Packers | Kyle Wachholtz | QB | USC | |
| 7 | 241 | Kansas City Chiefs | Jeff Smith | C | Tennessee | |
| 7 | 242 | Pittsburgh Steelers | Carlos Emmons | LB | Arkansas State | |
| 7 | 243 | Dallas Cowboys | Ryan Wood | FB | Arizona State | |
| 7* | 244 | Buffalo Bills | Jay Riemersma | TE | Michigan | |
| 7* | 245 | Kansas City Chiefs | Darrell Williams | CB | Tennessee State | |
| 7* | 246 | New Orleans Saints | Henry Lusk | TE | Utah | |
| 7* | 247 | New England Patriots | J. R. Conrad | T | Oklahoma | |
| 7* | 248 | Oakland Raiders | Joey Wylie | G | Stephen F. Austin | |
| 7* | 249 | Buffalo Bills | Eric Smedley | S | Indiana | |
| 7* | 250 | Washington Redskins | DeAndre Maxwell | WR | San Diego State | |
| 7* | 251 | Miami Dolphins | Brice Hunter | WR | Georgia | |
| 7* | 252 | Green Bay Packers | Keith McKenzie | LB | Ball State | |
| 7* | 253 | Chicago Bears | Michael Hicks | RB | South Carolina State | |
| 7* | 254 | San Francisco 49ers | Sam Manuel | LB | New Mexico State | |

== Notable undrafted players ==
| † | Pro Bowler |
| ‡ | Hall of Famer |

| Original NFL team | Player | Pos. | College | Notes |
|---|---|---|---|---|
| Arizona Cardinals | Kevin Jordan | WR | UCLA | |
| Arizona Cardinals | Ronald McKinnon | LB | North Alabama | |
| Atlanta Falcons | Freddie Scott | WR | Penn State | |
| Baltimore Ravens | Spencer Folau | T | Idaho | |
| Baltimore Ravens | Corey Sears | DE | Mississippi State | |
| Chicago Bears | Todd McMillon | CB | Northern Arizona | |
| Cincinnati Bengals | Nick Ferguson | S | Georgia Tech | |
| Cincinnati Bengals | Brock Gutierrez | C | Central Michigan | |
| Cincinnati Bengals | Chris Hetherington | FB | Yale | |
| Cincinnati Bengals | Damon Huard | QB | Washington | |
| Cincinnati Bengals | James Hundon | WR | Portland State | |
| Cincinnati Bengals | Kerry Joseph | S | McNeese State | |
| Cincinnati Bengals | Tim Morabito | DT | Boston College | |
| Dallas Cowboys | Tony Hutson | G | Northeastern State | |
| Denver Broncos | Jason Kaiser | S | Culver–Stockton | |
| Detroit Lions | Barry Stokes | G | Eastern Michigan | |
| Green Bay Packers | Brad Keeney | DT | The Citadel | |
| Green Bay Packers | Michael Robinson | CB | Hampton | |
| Houston Oilers | Lenoy Jones | LB | TCU | |
| Houston Oilers | James Ritchey | QB | Stephen F. Austin | |
| Indianapolis Colts | Sammie Burroughs | LB | Portland State | |
| Indianapolis Colts | Kendel Shello | DE | Southern | |
| Indianapolis Colts | Casey Wiegmann ^{†} | C | Iowa | |
| Miami Dolphins | Larry Izzo ^{†} | LB | Rice | |
| Miami Dolphins | Kyle Richardson | P | Arkansas State | |
| Minnesota Vikings | Harold Morrow | FB | Auburn | |
| New England Patriots | Ray Lucas | QB | Rutgers | |
| New England Patriots | Adam Vinatieri^{‡}^{†} | K | South Dakota State | |
| New York Giants | Kevin Alexander | WR | Utah State | |
| New York Giants | Percy Ellsworth | S | Virginia | |
| New York Giants | Olindo Mare ^{†} | K | Syracuse | |
| New York Jets | Kwame Ellis | DB | Stanford | |
| Philadelphia Eagles | Joe Cummings | LB | Wyoming | |
| Philadelphia Eagles | Bubba Miller | C | Tennessee | |
| Philadelphia Eagles | Hollis Thomas | DT | Northern Illinois | |
| Philadelphia Eagles | Morris Unutoa | C | BYU | |
| Pittsburgh Steelers | Ricky Bell | CB | NC State | |
| San Francisco 49ers | Dave Fiore | G | Hofstra | |
| Seattle Seahawks | Frank Beede | G | Panhandle State | |
| Seattle Seahawks | Greg Bloedorn | C | Cornell | |
| Seattle Seahawks | Jon Kitna | QB | Central Washington | |
| Seattle Seahawks | Grant Williams | T | Louisiana Tech | |
| St. Louis Rams | Josh Miller | P | Arizona | |
| St. Louis Rams | Marquis Walker | CB | Southeast Missouri State | |
| Tampa Bay Buccaneers | Jorge Diaz | G | Texas A&M–Kingsville | |
| Tampa Bay Buccaneers | Kevin Dogins | C | Texas A&M–Kingsville | |
| Tampa Bay Buccaneers | Jeff Gooch | LB | Austin Peay | |
| Tampa Bay Buccaneers | Scott Milanovich | QB | Maryland | |
| Tampa Bay Buccaneers | Karl Williams | WR | Texas A&M–Kingsville | |
| Washington Redskins | Larry Bowie | FB | Georgia | |
| Washington Redskins | Chris Sedoris | C | Purdue | |
| Washington Redskins | Brian Walker | S | Washington State | |

== Hall of Famers ==
- Jonathan Ogden, offensive tackle from UCLA, taken 1st round 4th overall by the Baltimore Ravens.

Inducted: Professional Football Hall of Fame class of 2013.

- Marvin Harrison, wide receiver from Syracuse, taken 1st round 19th overall by the Indianapolis Colts.

Inducted: Professional Football Hall of Fame class of 2016.

- Ray Lewis, linebacker from Miami (FL), taken 1st round 26th overall by the Baltimore Ravens.

Inducted: Professional Football Hall of Fame class of 2018.

- Brian Dawkins, safety from Clemson, taken 2nd round 61st overall by the Philadelphia Eagles.

Inducted: Professional Football Hall of Fame class of 2018.

- Terrell Owens, wide receiver from Chattanooga, taken 3rd round 89th overall by the San Francisco 49ers.

Inducted: Professional Football Hall of Fame class of 2018.

- Zach Thomas, linebacker from Texas Tech, taken 5th round 154th overall by the Miami Dolphins.

Inducted: Professional Football Hall of Fame class of 2023.

- Adam Vinatieri, placekicker from South Dakota State, undrafted.

Inducted: Professional Football Hall of Fame class of 2026.

== Trades ==
In the explanations below, (D) denotes trades that took place during the 1994 Draft, while (PD) indicates trades completed pre-draft.

Round 1

Round 2

Round 3

Round 4

Round 5

Round 6

Round 7

== Forfeited picks ==
One selection in the 1996 draft was forfeited:
