= Sean Boyd =

Sean Boyd may refer to:

- Sean Boyd (American football), American football player
- Seán Boyd (footballer), Irish professional footballer
- Sean Boyd (water polo), Australian water polo player
