= Hensley Sapenter =

American football player, coach, and administrator (born 1939)

Biographical details
- Born: December 16, 1939 (age 86)

Playing career
- late 1950s: Prairie View
- Positions: Center, linebacker

Coaching career (HC unless noted)
- 1961–1965: Booker T. Washington HS (TX) (assistant)
- ?–1970: Wheatley HS (TX) (assistant)
- 1971: Fox Tech HS (TX) (assistant)
- 1995–1996: Prairie View

Administrative career (AD unless noted)
- 1976–1995: San Antonio ISD
- 1995–1996: Prairie View

Head coaching record
- Overall: 0–22 (college)

Accomplishments and honors

Awards
- Texas Black Sports Hall of Fame (2003)

Hensley W. Sapenter (born December 16, 1939) is an American former football coach and athletics administrator. He served as the head football coach at Prairie View A&M University from 1995 to 1996, compiling a record of 0–22. Sapenter was inducted into the Texas Black Sports Hall of Fame in 2003.

== Early life and playing career ==
Sapenter grew up in San Antonio and attended Wheatley High School there. He played college football at Prairie View A&M University as a center and linebacker for in the late 1950s under head coach Billy Nicks. He was inducted into the school's Sports Hall of Fame in 1995.

== Coaching career ==
After graduating from Prairie View in 1960, Sapenter began his coaching career at Booker T. Washington High School in Wichita Falls, Texas, working as an assistant football coach under Ervin Garnet.

Sapenter was hired as the athletic director for the San Antonio Independent School District in 1976. He had recently retired from that post when, in 1995, he was hired as interim head football coach, and athletic director at Prairie View, despite having not coached at any level since 1972. He was told that he would only be considered for the full-time job if he could win.

In two years, Sapenter finished 0–22, making him one of the few college football coaches to have never won a game. During his tenure, his teams were outscored 950–210.

On September 23, Prairie View was drubbed, 44–6 by Tarleton State tying Macalester's NCAA record 50 straight losses. They broke the tie the next week with a 64–0 thumping by Grambling State—the 399th career win for Grambling's legendary coach, Eddie Robinson.

The streak grew to 80 consecutive losses before it was broken in 1998. Sapenter was first suspended with pay and then subsequently fired following an investigation into the use of ineligible players.

== Head coaching record ==
Year	Team	Overall	Conference	Standing	Bowl/playoffs
Prairie View A&M Panthers (Southwestern Athletic Conference) (1995–1996)
1995	Prairie View A&M	0–11	0–7	8th	
1996	Prairie View A&M	0–11	0–7	8th	
Prairie View A&M:		0–22	0–4		
Total:		0–22			
