= 1995 Nicholls State Colonels football team =

American college football season

1995 Nicholls State Colonels football
- Conference: Southland Conference
- Record: 0–11 (0–5 Southland)
- Head coach: Darren Barbier (1st season)
- Defensive coordinator: Manny Michel (1st season)
- Home stadium: John L. Guidry Stadium

1995 Southland Conference football standings
	Conf.					Overall
Team	W		L		T	W		L		T
No. 1 McNeese State $^	5	–	0	–	0	13	–	1	–	0
No. 5 Stephen F. Austin ^	4	–	1	–	0	11	–	2	–	0
Northwestern State	2	–	3	–	0	6	–	5	–	0
Sam Houston State	2	–	3	–	0	5	–	5	–	0
Southwest Texas State	2	–	3	–	0	4	–	7	–	0
Nicholls State	0	–	5	–	0	0	–	11	–	0
$ – Conference champion; ^ – NCAA Division I-AA playoff participant; Rankings from The Sports Network poll

The 1995 Nicholls State Colonels football team represented Nicholls State University as a member of the Southland Conference during the 1995 NCAA Division I-AA football season. Led by first-year head coach Darren Barbier, the Colonels compiled an overall record of 0–11 with mark of 0–5 in conference play, placing last out of six teams in the Southland. Nicholls State played home games at John L. Guidry Stadium in Thibodaux, Louisiana.

== Schedule ==
Date	Opponent	Site	Result	Attendance	Source
September 2	at Hofstra*	Hofstra Stadium; Hempstead, NY	L 10–34	4,379	
September 9	at Northeast Louisiana*	Malone Stadium; Monroe, LA	L 21–34	19,470	
September 16	No. 8 Troy State*	John L. Guidry Stadium; Thibodaux, LA	L 3–17		
September 23	at Southern Illinois*	McAndrew Stadium; Carbondale, IL	L 20–48	7,600	
September 30	Samford*	John L. Guidry Stadium; Thibodaux, LA	L 20–36	2,503	
October 7	at Northwestern State	Harry Turpin Stadium; Natchitoches, LA (rivalry)	L 14–34		
October 14	at No. 4 Stephen F. Austin	Homer Bryce Stadium; Nacogdoches, TX	L 3–56		
October 21	Southwest Texas State	John L. Guidry Stadium; Thibodaux, LA (rivalry)	L 25–35		
October 28	at No. 13 Southern*	Ace W. Mumford Stadium; Baton Rouge, LA	L 3–41		
November 4	Sam Houston State	John L. Guidry Stadium; Thibodaux, LA	L 17–24		
November 18	No. 1 McNeese State	John L. Guidry Stadium; Thibodaux, LA	L 6–31	3,061	
*Non-conference game; Rankings from The Sports Network Poll released prior to the game
