= 1995 Northwestern State Demons football team =

American college football season

1995 Northwestern State Demons football
- Conference: Southland Conference
- Record: 6–5 (2–3 SLC)
- Head coach: Sam Goodwin (13th season)
- Home stadium: Harry Turpin Stadium

1995 Southland Conference football standings
	Conf.					Overall
Team	W		L		T	W		L		T
No. 1 McNeese State $^	5	–	0	–	0	13	–	1	–	0
No. 5 Stephen F. Austin ^	4	–	1	–	0	11	–	2	–	0
Northwestern State	2	–	3	–	0	6	–	5	–	0
Sam Houston State	2	–	3	–	0	5	–	5	–	0
Southwest Texas State	2	–	3	–	0	4	–	7	–	0
Nicholls State	0	–	5	–	0	0	–	11	–	0
$ – Conference champion; ^ – NCAA Division I-AA playoff participant; Rankings from The Sports Network poll

The 1995 Northwestern State Demons football team was an American football team that represented Northwestern State University as a member of the Southland Conference during the 1995 NCAA Division I-AA football season. In their 13th year under head coach Sam Goodwin, the team compiled an overall record of 6–5, with a mark of 2–3 in conference play, and finished tied for third in the Southland.

== Schedule ==
Date	Time	Opponent	Rank	Site	Result	Attendance	Source
September 2		at No. 10 Southern*		A. W. Mumford Stadium; Baton Rouge, LA	L 7–13	19,106	
September 9		at No. 9 Troy State*		Veterans Memorial Stadium; Troy, AL	L 17–34	6,300	
September 16		Delta State*		Harry Turpin Stadium; Natchitoches, LA	W 34–0		
September 23		East Texas State*		Harry Turpin Stadium; Natchitoches, LA	W 45–17	10,800	
September 30		at No. 11 Boise State*		Bronco Stadium; Boise, ID	W 22–17	22,364	
October 7		Nicholls State		Harry Turpin Stadium; Natchitoches, LA (rivalry)	W 34–14		
October 14		at Sam Houston State	No. 24	Bowers Stadium; Huntsville, TX	W 24–2		
October 21	7:00 p.m.	at Northeast Louisiana*	No. 19	Malone Stadium; Monroe, LA (rivalry)	W 42–39	16,682	
October 28		Southwest Texas State	No. 14	Harry Turpin Stadium; Natchitoches, LA	L 14–28		
November 11		at No. 1 McNeese State	No. 19	Cowboy Stadium; Lake Charles, LA (rivalry)	L 10–20		
November 16		No. 5 Stephen F. Austin	No. 21	Harry Turpin Stadium; Natchitoches, LA (rivalry)	L 20–25		
*Non-conference game; Rankings from The Sports Network Poll released prior to the game; All times are in Central time
