= 1995 Southwest Texas State Bobcats football team =

American college football season

1995 Southwest Texas State Bobcats football
- Conference: Southland Conference
- Record: 4–7 (2–3 SLC)
- Head coach: Jim Bob Helduser (4th season)
- Home stadium: Bobcat Stadium

1995 Southland Conference football standings
	Conf.					Overall
Team	W		L		T	W		L		T
No. 1 McNeese State $^	5	–	0	–	0	13	–	1	–	0
No. 5 Stephen F. Austin ^	4	–	1	–	0	11	–	2	–	0
Northwestern State	2	–	3	–	0	6	–	5	–	0
Sam Houston State	2	–	3	–	0	5	–	5	–	0
Southwest Texas State	2	–	3	–	0	4	–	7	–	0
Nicholls State	0	–	5	–	0	0	–	11	–	0
$ – Conference champion; ^ – NCAA Division I-AA playoff participant; Rankings from The Sports Network poll

The 1995 Southwest Texas State Bobcats football team was an American football team that represented Southwest Texas State University (now known as Texas State University) during the 1995 NCAA Division I-AA football season as a member of the Southland Conference (SLC). In their fourth year under head coach Jim Bob Helduser, the team compiled an overall record of 4–7 with a mark of 2–3 in conference play.

== Schedule ==
Date	Opponent	Site	Result	Attendance	Source
September 7	Eastern Washington*	Bobcat Stadium; San Marcos, TX	L 16–34	6,771	
September 14	Texas A&M–Kingsville*	Bobcat Stadium; San Marcos, TX	L 12–40		
September 23	at Montana State*	Sales Stadium; Bozeman, MT	L 24–45	12,137	
September 30	Southern Utah*	Bobcat Stadium; San Marcos, TX	W 65–15	5,844	
October 7	Cal State Northridge*	Bobcat Stadium; San Marcos, TX	W 43–14	3,814	
October 14	at Sacramento State*	Hornet Stadium; Sacramento, CA	L 3–12	2,084	
October 21	at Nicholls State	John L. Guidry Stadium; Thibodaux, LA (rivalry)	W 35–25		
October 28	at No. 14 Northwestern State	Harry Turpin Stadium; Natchitoches, LA	W 28–14		
November 4	No. 1 McNeese State	Bobcat Stadium; San Marcos, TX	L 7–28		
November 11	at No. 6 Stephen F. Austin	Homer Bryce Stadium; Nacogdoches, TX	L 21–50	5,550	
November 18	Sam Houston State	Bobcat Stadium; San Marcos, TX (rivalry)	L 20–26	3,307	
*Non-conference game; Rankings from The Sports Network Poll released prior to the game
