= 1995 Jackson State Tigers football team =

American college football season

1995 Jackson State Tigers football

SWAC champion

NCAA Division I-AA First Round, L 8–38 vs. Marshall
- Conference: Southwestern Athletic Conference

Ranking
- Sports Network: No. 14
- Record: 9–3 (7–0 SWAC)
- Head coach: James Carson (4th season)
- Home stadium: Mississippi Veterans Memorial Stadium

1995 Southwestern Athletic Conference football standings
	Conf.			Overall
Team	W		L	W		L
No. 14 Jackson State $^	7	–	0	9	–	3
No. 11 Southern	6	–	1	11	–	1
Alabama State	5	–	2	8	–	3
Grambling State	4	–	3	5	–	6
Alcorn State	3	–	4	4	–	7
Mississippi Valley State	2	–	5	2	–	9
Texas Southern	1	–	6	2	–	8
Prairie View A&M	0	–	7	0	–	11
$ – Conference champion; ^ – NCAA Division I-AA playoff participant; Rankings from The Sports Network Poll

The 1995 Jackson State Tigers football team represented Jackson State University as a member of the Southwestern Athletic Conference (SWAC) during the 1995 NCAA Division I-AA football season. Led by fourth-year head coach James Carson, the Tigers compiled an overall record of 9–3 and a mark of 7–0 in conference play, and finished as SWAC champion. Jackson State finished their season with a loss against Marshall in the Division I-AA playoffs.

== Schedule ==
Date	Opponent	Rank	Site	Result	Attendance	Source
September 3	vs. Alabama A&M*		Legion Field; Birmingham, AL (Labor Day Classic)	L 20–21	48,800	
September 9	vs. Tennessee State*		Liberty Bowl Memorial Stadium; Memphis, TN (Southern Heritage Classic)	W 24–18	48,533	
September 16	at Florida A&M*		Bragg Memorial Stadium; Tallahassee, FL	L 12–15	13,914	
September 23	Mississippi Valley State		Mississippi Veterans Memorial Stadium; Jackson, MS	W 47–7	18,223	
September 30	vs. Alabama State		Soldier Field; Chicago, IL (Chicago Classic)	W 24–22	36,712	
October 14	No. 10 Southern		Mississippi Veterans Memorial Stadium; Jackson, MS (rivalry)	W 16–14	57,376	
October 21	Grambling State		Mississippi Veterans Memorial Stadium; Jackson, MS	W 29–28	11,888	
October 28	Arkansas–Pine Bluff*	No. 23	Mississippi Veterans Memorial Stadium; Jackson, MS	W 29–26		
November 4	vs. Texas Southern	No. 19	Cotton Bowl; Dallas, TX (Gridiron Classic)	W 13–9		
November 11	at Prairie View A&M	No. 16	Edward L. Blackshear Field; Prairie View, TX	W 68–0		
November 18	Alcorn State	No. 14	Mississippi Veterans Memorial Stadium; Jackson, MS (Capital City Classic)	W 28–7	55,300	
November 25	at No. 6 Marshall*	No. 14	Marshall University Stadium; Huntington, WV (NCAA Division I-AA First Round)	L 8–38	13,035	
*Non-conference game; Rankings from NCAA Division I-AA Football Committee Poll released prior to the game
