= 1995 Texas Southern Tigers football team =

American college football season

1995 Texas Southern Tigers football
- Conference: Southwestern Athletic Conference
- Record: 2–8 (1–6 SWAC)
- Head coach: William A. Thomas (2nd season)
- Home stadium: Rice Stadium; Robertson Stadium; Durley Stadium

1995 Southwestern Athletic Conference football standings
	Conf.			Overall
Team	W		L	W		L
No. 14 Jackson State $^	7	–	0	9	–	3
No. 11 Southern	6	–	1	11	–	1
Alabama State	5	–	2	8	–	3
Grambling State	4	–	3	5	–	6
Alcorn State	3	–	4	4	–	7
Mississippi Valley State	2	–	5	2	–	9
Texas Southern	1	–	6	2	–	8
Prairie View A&M	0	–	7	0	–	11
$ – Conference champion; ^ – NCAA Division I-AA playoff participant; Rankings from The Sports Network Poll

The 1995 Texas Southern Tigers football team represented Texas Southern University as a member of the Southwestern Athletic Conference (SWAC) during the 1995 NCAA Division I-AA football season. Led by second-year head coach William A. Thomas, the Tigers compiled an overall record of 2–8, with a mark of 1–6 in conference play, and finished seventh in the SWAC.

== Schedule ==
Date	Opponent	Site	Result	Source
September 3	Prairie View A&M	Rice Stadium; Houston, TX (Labor Day Classic)	W 50–8	
September 9	vs. Clark Atlanta*	Kermit Courville Stadium; Galveston, TX (Island Classic)	W 28–0	
September 23	Alcorn State	Robertson Stadium; Houston, TX	L 10–21	
September 30	Sam Houston State*	Durley Stadium; Houston, TX	L 13–24	
October 7	at Arkansas–Pine Bluff*	Pumphrey Stadium; Pine Bluff, AR	L 22–36	
October 14	Alabama State	Robertson Stadium; Houston, TX	L 19–27	
October 21	at Mississippi Valley State	Magnolia Stadium; Itta Bena, MS	L 21–28	
October 28	at Grambling State	Eddie G. Robinson Memorial Stadium; Grambling, LA	L 14–56	
November 4	vs. No. 19 Jackson State	Cotton Bowl; Dallas, TX (Gridiron Classic)	L 9–13	
November 11	No. 11 Southern	Robertson Stadium; Houston, TX	L 13–48	
*Non-conference game; Rankings from The Sports Network Poll released prior to the game
