= 1995 Mississippi Valley State Delta Devils football team =

American college football season

1995 Mississippi Valley State Delta Devils football
- Conference: Southwestern Athletic Conference
- Record: 2–9 (2–5 SWAC)
- Head coach: Larry Dorsey (6th season)
- Home stadium: Magnolia Stadium

1995 Southwestern Athletic Conference football standings
	Conf.			Overall
Team	W		L	W		L
No. 14 Jackson State $^	7	–	0	9	–	3
No. 11 Southern	6	–	1	11	–	1
Alabama State	5	–	2	8	–	3
Grambling State	4	–	3	5	–	6
Alcorn State	3	–	4	4	–	7
Mississippi Valley State	2	–	5	2	–	9
Texas Southern	1	–	6	2	–	8
Prairie View A&M	0	–	7	0	–	11
$ – Conference champion; ^ – NCAA Division I-AA playoff participant; Rankings from The Sports Network Poll

The 1995 Mississippi Valley State Delta Devils football team represented Mississippi Valley State University as a member of the Southwestern Athletic Conference (SWAC) during the 1995 NCAA Division I-AA football season. Led by sixth-year head coach Larry Dorsey, the Delta Devils compiled an overall record of 2–9, with a conference record of 2–5, and finished sixth in the SWAC.

== Schedule ==
Date	Opponent	Site	Result	Attendance	Source
September 2	at Arkansas–Pine Bluff*	War Memorial Stadium; Little Rock, AR	L 16–41		
September 9	vs. Lane*	Tupelo H.S. Stadium; Tupelo, MS	L 14–25		
September 23	at Jackson State	Mississippi Veterans Memorial Stadium; Jackson, MS	L 7–47	18,223	
September 30	No. 9 Southern	Magnolia Stadium; Itta Bena, MS	L 6–44		
October 7	at Grambling State	Eddie G. Robinson Memorial Stadium; Grambling, LA	L 6–42	11,500	
October 14	at Central State*	McPherson Stadium; Wilberforce, OH	L 12–59	5,150	
October 21	Texas Southern	Magnolia Stadium; Itta Bena, MS	W 28–21		
October 28	at Prairie View A&M	Edward L. Blackshear Field; Prairie View, TX	W 35–14		
November 4	at Alcorn State	Jack Spinks Stadium; Lorman, MS	L 27–38		
November 11	Alabama State	Magnolia Stadium; Itta Bena, MS	L 28–56		
November 18	at Arkansas State*	Indian Stadium; Jonesboro, AR	L 3–55		
*Non-conference game; Rankings from NCAA Division I-AA Football Committee Poll released prior to the game
