= 1995 Alabama A&M Bulldogs football team =

College football season

1995 Alabama A&M Bulldogs football
- Conference: Southern Intercollegiate Athletic Conference
- Record: 6–5 (5–3 SIAC)
- Head coach: Kenneth Pettiford (1st season)
- Home stadium: Milton Frank Stadium

1995 Southern Intercollegiate Athletic Conference football standings
	Conf.					Overall
Team	W		L		T	W		L		T
No. 12 Albany State $^	7	–	1	–	0	8	–	4	–	0
Alabama A&M	5	–	3	–	0	6	–	5	–	0
Clark Atlanta	5	–	3	–	0	5	–	5	–	0
Morehouse	5	–	3	–	0	5	–	6	–	0
Savannah State	4	–	4	–	0	7	–	4	–	0
Miles	4	–	4	–	0	4	–	6	–	0
Fort Valley State	3	–	5	–	0	3	–	8	–	0
Tuskegee	2	–	6	–	0	2	–	8	–	0
Morris Brown	1	–	7	–	0	1	–	9	–	0
Kentucky State	0	–	0	–	0	7	–	4	–	0
$ – Conference champion; ^ – NCAA Division II playoff participant; Rankings from NCAA Division II Football Committee poll

The 1995 Alabama A&M Bulldogs football team represented Alabama Agricultural and Mechanical University as a member of the Southern Intercollegiate Athletic Conference (SIAC) during the 1995 NCAA Division II football season. Led by first-year head coach Kenneth Pettiford, the Bulldogs compiled an overall record of 6–5 with a mark of 5–3 in conference play, tying for second place in the SIAC.

== Schedule ==
Date	Time	Opponent	Site	Result	Attendance	Source
September 3		vs. Jackson State*	Legion Field; Birmingham, AL	W 21–20	48,800	
September 9		No. 1 North Alabama*	Milton Frank Stadium; Huntsville, AL	L 0–49	11,238	
September 16		at Clark Atlanta	Georgia Dome; Atlanta, GA	W 7–0	2,309	
September 23		at No. 6 Savannah State	Ted Wright Stadium; Savannah, GA	W 11–8	4,397	
September 30		Morris Brown	Milton Frank Stadium; Huntsville, AL	W 26–6	11,225	
October 7		Morehouse	Milton Frank Stadium; Huntsville, AL	W 48–14	5,247	
October 14		at No. 7 Albany State	Hugh Mills Stadium; Albany, GA	L 9–45	4,782	
October 21		Fort Valley State	Milton Frank Stadium; Huntsville, AL	W 24–20	5,075	
October 28		vs. Alabama State*	Legion Field; Birmingham, AL (Magic City Classic)	L 20–37	62,284	
November 4		at Miles	Alumni Stadium; Fairfield, AL	L 20–26 ^{OT}	950	
November 11	1:00 p.m.	vs. Tuskegee	Ladd Memorial Stadium; Mobile, AL	L 6–19	5,358	
*Non-conference game; Rankings from NCAA Division II Football Committee Poll released prior to the game; All times are in Central time; Source:
