= Donnell Baker =

American football player (1973–2020)

No. 84
- Position: Wide receiver

Personal information
- Born: December 21, 1973; San Francisco, California, U.S.
- Died: February 5, 2020 (aged 46); Baton Rouge, Louisiana, U.S.
- Listed height: 6 ft 0 in (1.83 m)
- Listed weight: 180 lb (82 kg)

Career information
- High school: Baton Rouge (LA) Glen Oaks
- College: Southern
- NFL draft: 1996: 7th round, 217th overall pick

Career history
- Carolina Panthers (1996)*; St. Louis Rams (1996); Jacksonville Jaguars (1997)*; St. Louis Rams (1997–1998)*
- * Offseason or practice squad member only

Donnell Keith Baker (December 21, 1973 – February 5, 2020) was an American professional football wide receiver who played for the Carolina Panthers and St. Louis Rams of the National Football League (NFL). He played college football at Southern University.

== Professional career ==
=== Carolina Panthers ===
Baker was selected in the seventh round by the Carolina Panthers with the 217th pick in the 1996 NFL draft. He was released by the Panthers on August 25, 1996.

=== St. Louis Rams ===
Baker was a member of the St. Louis Rams from 1996 to 1998. He was released by the Rams on August 24, 1998.
