= 1995 Prairie View A&M Panthers football team =

American college football season

1995 Prairie View A&M Panthers football
- Conference: Southwestern Athletic Conference
- Record: 0–11 (0–7 SWAC)
- Head coach: Hensley Sapenter (1st season)
- Home stadium: Edward L. Blackshear Field

1995 Southwestern Athletic Conference football standings
	Conf.			Overall
Team	W		L	W		L
No. 14 Jackson State $^	7	–	0	9	–	3
No. 11 Southern	6	–	1	11	–	1
Alabama State	5	–	2	8	–	3
Grambling State	4	–	3	5	–	6
Alcorn State	3	–	4	4	–	7
Mississippi Valley State	2	–	5	2	–	9
Texas Southern	1	–	6	2	–	8
Prairie View A&M	0	–	7	0	–	11
$ – Conference champion; ^ – NCAA Division I-AA playoff participant; Rankings from The Sports Network Poll

The 1995 Prairie View A&M Panthers football team represented Prairie View A&M University as a member of the Southwestern Athletic Conference (SWAC) during the 1995 NCAA Division I-AA football season. Led by first-year head coach Hensley Sapenter, the Panthers compiled an overall record of 0–11, with a mark of 0–7 in conference play, and finished eighth in the SWAC.

== Schedule ==
Date	Opponent	Site	Result	Attendance	Source
September 3	at Texas Southern	Rice Stadium; Houston, TX (Labor Day Classic)	L 8–50		
September 9	at Abilene Christian*	Shotwell Stadium; Abilene, TX	L 0–35		
September 16	at No. 10 Southern	A. W. Mumford Stadium; Baton Rouge, LA	L 6–68		
September 23	at Tarleton State*	Memorial Stadium; Stephenville, TX	L 6–44		
September 30	vs. Grambling State	Cotton Bowl; Dallas, TX (State Fair Classic)	L 0–64	63,425	
October 7	Langston*	Edward L. Blackshear Field; Prairie View, TX	L 12–48		
October 14	at Alcorn State	Jack Spinks Stadium; Lorman, MS	L 2–13		
October 21	at Alabama State	Cramton Bowl; Montgomery, AL	L 16–49		
October 28	Mississippi Valley State	Edward L. Blackshear Field; Prairie View, TX	L 14–35		
November 4	at Midwestern State*	Memorial Stadium; Wichita Falls, TX	L 15–37	1,500	
November 11	No. 16 Jackson State	Edward L. Blackshear Field; Prairie View, TX	L 0–68		
*Non-conference game; Rankings from NCAA Division I-AA Football Committee Poll released prior to the game
