= Dedric Mathis =

American gridiron football player (born 1973)

No. 26, 23
- Position: Cornerback

Personal information
- Born: September 26, 1973 (age 53); Cuero, Texas, U.S.
- Listed height: 5 ft 10 in (1.78 m)
- Listed weight: 188 lb (85 kg)

Career information
- High school: Cuero
- College: Houston
- NFL draft: 1996: 2nd round, 51st overall pick

Career history
- Indianapolis Colts (1996–1997); Chicago Bears (1998)*; Orlando Predators (2000); Chicago Enforcers (2001); Hamilton Tiger-Cats (2001–2005)
- * Offseason or practice squad member only

Awards and highlights
- ArenaBowl champion (2000)

Career NFL statistics
- Tackles: 85
- Interceptions: 1
- Stats at Pro Football Reference

Career CFL statistics
- Tackles: 161
- Interceptions: 7
- Stats at CFL.ca (archived)

Career AFL statistics
- Tackles: 23
- Stats at ArenaFan.com

Dedric Ronshell Mathis (born September 26, 1973) is an American former professional football player who was a defensive back in the National Football League (NFL), Arena Football League (AFL) and Canadian Football League (CFL). He played college football for the Houston Cougars. Mathis was selected by the Indianapolis Colts in the second round of the 1996 NFL draft. He also played for the Orlando Predators of the AFL and Hamilton Tiger-Cats of the CFL.
