= Southern Heritage Classic =

Football competition

- Alcorn State Arkansas–Pine Bluff
- Sport: American football
- First meeting: September 8, 1990; Tennessee State, 23–14
- Latest meeting: September 12, 2026; Alcorn State, 53–51^{2OT}
- Stadiums: Simmons Bank Liberty Stadium (1990–present)

Statistics
- Total meetings: 35
- All-time series: Tennessee State, 19–12
- Largest victory: Tennessee State, 64–33 (2001); Tennessee State, 44–14 (2003)
- Longest win streak: Tennessee State, 7 (2003–2009)
- Current win streak: Alcorn State, 1 (2026–)

Locations of UAPB, Alcorn State, and Memphis

The Southern Heritage Classic presented by FedEx is an annual historically black college football game between the Golden Lions of University of Arkansas at Pine Bluff (UAPB) and the Braves of Alcorn State University. UAPB replaced Jackson State University after Jackson State played 29 games in the classic and Alcorn State replaced Tennessee State University after Tennessee State played 33 games in the classic.

== Location ==
The game is held at Simmons Bank Liberty Stadium in Memphis.

== Annual attendance ==
The record for attendance, 61,171, was set in 1997. Since the Jackson State–Tennessee State rivalry became a fixture in 1994, the average attendance for a Southern Heritage Classic game was about 50,000. Both schools are roughly equidistant from Memphis, being located approximately 200 miles away. The 2001 game was moved from its originally scheduled date of September 15 to November 22 due to the events of the September 11 terrorist attacks, and attendance suffered as a result, drawing only 28,690. The attendance for the 2024 was around 28,000 which was the lowest attended game since 1991. With Jackson State and Tennessee State no longer participating in the classic, attendance is expected to be significantly lower than years past.

== Economic impact ==
At its peak, the classic and several festivities affiliated with it generated approximately $21 million for the Memphis economy and $325,000 for each university annually. The game also features a highly anticipated battle of the bands. The Southern Heritage Classic tailgating experience has traditionally been a large draw and begins days before the game. Concerts and other events fill up the weekend calendar in the Memphis area, drawing fans from all over the country. Past concerts have included headline stars such as Luther Vandross, The O'Jays, Gap Band, Gladys Knight and Usher.

== History ==
Although the two teams played each other, the games were played at each team's home field on an alternating basis. That made it difficult for fans of the road team to travel en masse. Both head coaches, Bill Thomas from TSU and W. C. Gorden from JSU discussed the possibility of playing annually at a neutral site in Memphis; which was roughly equidistant from both campuses. Doing so benefited both schools by enhancing the rivalry and bringing in more dollars and the large alumni bases in the Memphis metro area.

The Southern Heritage Classic was founded and has been produced by Fred Jones Jr. A Memphis entrepreneur and entertainment producer, Jones was tasked with organizing the game as officials from both schools weren't familiar enough with the Memphis area.

The Classic part of the series between the two schools began in 1990, with Tennessee State winning 23–14. There were only two games staged in the period between 1990 and 2022 in which Jackson State did not participate — 1991 and 1993. Mississippi Valley State played Tennessee State in 1991, and Grambling State was TSU's opponent in 1993. Tennessee State played in every Southern Heritage Classic from the game's inception until 2025, and had an overall record of 19–12 when participating in the contest.

The games have largely been close, hard-fought battles with three overtime games and fourteen contests decided by a touchdown or less. The record for the highest-scoring game was set in 2001, the game delayed by the September 11 terrorist attacks, when Tennessee State beat Jackson State, 64–33, for a combined 97 points. TSU quarterback Shannon Harris, passed for 360 yards and a Southern Heritage Classic record seven touchdowns in that game. Between 1995 and 2007, nine games out of thirteen were decided by seven points or less.

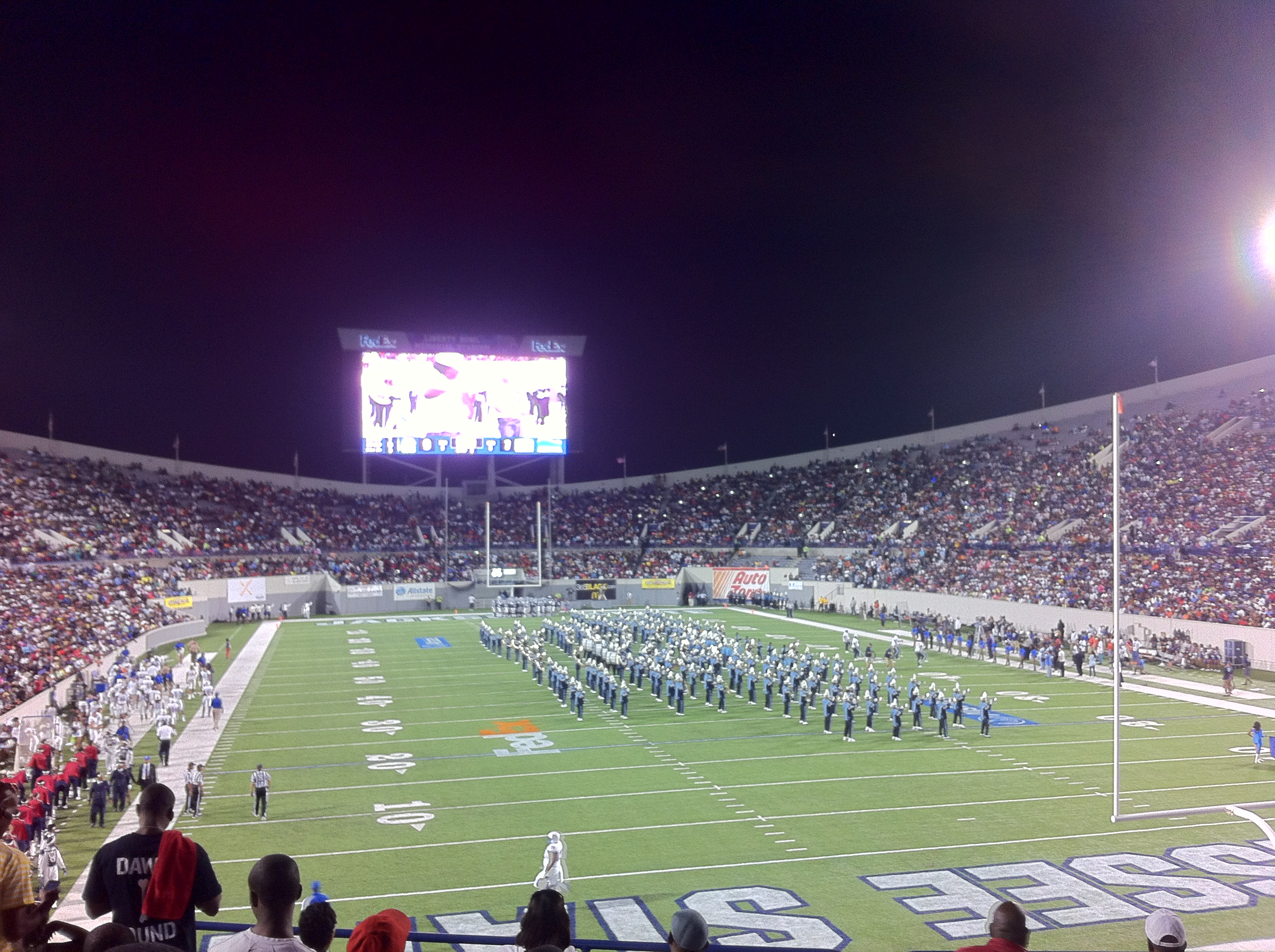
Halftime at the 2013 Southern Heritage Classic

Nearly 50 players who participated in the Southern Heritage Classic have gone on to play in the NFL, including four first-round draft picks: Lester Holmes (JSU offensive lineman, drafted 19th by the Philadelphia Eagles in 1993), Sylvester Morris (JSU wide receiver, drafted 21st by the Kansas City Chiefs in 2000), Rashard Anderson (JSU defensive back, drafted 23rd by the Carolina Panthers in 2000) and Dominique Rodgers-Cromartie (TSU defensive back, drafted 18th by the Arizona Cardinals in 2008).

The 2020 game, scheduled for September 12, was canceled due to the COVID-19 pandemic.

On February 2, 2022, Jackson State announced that the school would immediately leave the series due to conference conflicts. Tennessee State's president issued a scathing response stating the decision to terminate the series was “an insensitive and irresponsible act" with consequences that go beyond football. On February 11, 2022, Jackson State announced they will play in the 2022 Southern Heritage Classic for the last time. In October 2022, Jackson State paid $800,000 to settle a lawsuit over their exit of the classic.

On December 7, 2022, it was announced that Arkansas–Pine Bluff will replace Jackson State in the classic.

On February 28, 2025, it was announced that Alcorn State will replace Tennessee State in the classic.

== Game results ==
| Jackson State victories | Tennessee State victories | Other victories |

| No. | Date | Location | Winning team | | Losing team | |
|---|---|---|---|---|---|---|
| 1 | September 8, 1990 | Memphis, TN | Tennessee State | 23 | Jackson State | 14 |
| 2 | August 31, 1991 | Memphis, TN | Miss. Valley State^{†} | 10 | Tennessee State | 7 |
| 3 | September 12, 1992 | Memphis, TN | Jackson State | 38 | Tennessee State | 18 |
| 4 | September 18, 1993 | Memphis, TN | Grambling State^{†} | 33 | Tennessee State | 28 |
| 5 | September 10, 1994 | Memphis, TN | Jackson State | 31 | Tennessee State | 12 |
| 6 | September 9, 1995 | Memphis, TN | Jackson State | 24 | Tennessee State | 19 |
| 7 | September 14, 1996 | Memphis, TN | Jackson State | 21 | Tennessee State | 14 |
| 8 | September 13, 1997 | Memphis, TN | Jackson State | 31 | Tennessee State | 28 |
| 9 | September 12, 1998 | Memphis, TN | Tennessee State | 33 | Jackson State | 21 |
| 10 | September 11, 1999 | Memphis, TN | Tennessee State | 48 | Jackson State | 33 |
| 11 | September 16, 2000 | Memphis, TN | Jackson State | 42 | Tennessee State | 39 |
| 12 | November 22, 2001 | Memphis, TN | Tennessee State | 64 | Jackson State | 33 |
| 13 | September 14, 2002 | Memphis, TN | Jackson State | 31 | Tennessee State | 28 |
| 14 | September 13, 2003 | Memphis, TN | Tennessee State | 44 | Jackson State | 14 |
| 15 | September 18, 2004 | Memphis, TN | Tennessee State | 21 | Jackson State | 20 |
| 16 | September 10, 2005 | Memphis, TN | Tennessee State | 20 | Jackson State | 14 |
| 17 | September 16, 2006 | Memphis, TN | Tennessee State | 31 | Jackson State | 30 |
| 18 | September 8, 2007 | Memphis, TN | Tennessee State | 16 | Jackson State | 13 |
| 19 | September 13, 2008 | Memphis, TN | Tennessee State | 41 | Jackson State | 18 |

| No. | Date | Location | Winning team | | Losing team | |
|---|---|---|---|---|---|---|
| 20 | September 12, 2009 | Memphis, TN | Tennessee State | 14 | Jackson State | 7 |
| 21 | September 11, 2010 | Memphis, TN | Jackson State | 33 | Tennessee State | 26 |
| 22 | September 10, 2011 | Memphis, TN | Jackson State | 35 | Tennessee State | 29 |
| 23 | September 8, 2012 | Memphis, TN | Tennessee State | 38 | Jackson State | 12 |
| 24 | September 14, 2013 | Memphis, TN | Tennessee State | 26 | Jackson State | 16 |
| 25 | September 13, 2014 | Memphis, TN | Tennessee State | 35 | Jackson State | 7 |
| 26 | September 12, 2015 | Memphis, TN | Tennessee State | 35 | Jackson State | 25 |
| 27 | September 10, 2016 | Memphis, TN | Tennessee State | 40 | Jackson State | 26 |
| 28 | September 9, 2017 | Memphis, TN | Tennessee State | 17 | Jackson State | 15 |
| 29 | September 14, 2019 | Memphis, TN | Jackson State | 49 | Tennessee State | 44 |
| 30 | September 11, 2021 | Memphis, TN | Jackson State | 38 | Tennessee State | 16 |
| 31 | September 10, 2022 | Memphis, TN | Jackson State | 16 | Tennessee State | 3 |
| 32 | September 9, 2023 | Memphis, TN | Tennessee State | 24 | Arkansas–Pine Bluff^{†} | 14 |
| 33 | September 14, 2024 | Memphis, TN | Tennessee State | 41 | Arkansas–Pine Bluff^{†} | 28 |
| 34 | September 27, 2025 | Memphis, TN | Arkansas–Pine Bluff^{††} | 24 | Alcorn State^{††} | 20 |
| 35 | September 12, 2026 | Memphis, TN | Alcorn State^{††} | 53 | Arkansas–Pine Bluff^{††} | 51^{2OT} |
Series: Tennessee State leads 19–12
† Jackson State did not play in 1991, 1993, 2023 or 2024. The 2018 game was cancelled due to inclement weather. The 2020 game was cancelled due to the COVID-19 pandemic. †† Jackson State and Tennessee State do not participate starting in 2025.

== See also ==
- Aristocrat of Bands
- List of black college football classics
