= 1995 Stephen F. Austin Lumberjacks football team =

American college football season

1995 Stephen F. Austin Lumberjacks football

NCAA Division I-AA Semifinal, L 14–70 at Montana
- Conference: Southland Conference

Ranking
- Sports Network: No. 5
- Record: 11–2 (4–1 SLC)
- Head coach: John Pearce (4th season)
- Home stadium: Homer Bryce Stadium

1995 Southland Conference football standings
	Conf.					Overall
Team	W		L		T	W		L		T
No. 1 McNeese State $^	5	–	0	–	0	13	–	1	–	0
No. 5 Stephen F. Austin ^	4	–	1	–	0	11	–	2	–	0
Northwestern State	2	–	3	–	0	6	–	5	–	0
Sam Houston State	2	–	3	–	0	5	–	5	–	0
Southwest Texas State	2	–	3	–	0	4	–	7	–	0
Nicholls State	0	–	5	–	0	0	–	11	–	0
$ – Conference champion; ^ – NCAA Division I-AA playoff participant; Rankings from The Sports Network poll

The 1995 Stephen F. Austin Lumberjacks football team was an American football team that represented Stephen F. Austin State University as a member of the Southland Conference during the 1995 NCAA Division I-AA football season. In their fourth year under head coach John Pearce, the team compiled an overall record of 11–2, with a mark of 4–1 in conference play, and finished second in the Southland. The Lumberjacks advanced in the playoffs to the NCAA Division I-AA Semifinal and were defeated by eventual national champion Montana.

== Schedule ==
Date	Opponent	Rank	Site	Result	Attendance	Source
September 2	No. 19 Northern Iowa*	No. 13	Homer Bryce Stadium; Nacogdoches, TX	W 26–7	10,041	
September 9	at No. 6 Youngstown State*	No. 8	Stambaugh Stadium; Youngstown, OH	W 27–0		
September 16	Angelo State*	No. 5	Homer Bryce Stadium; Nacogdoches, TX	W 17–3	12,148	
September 23	Henderson State*	No. 5	Homer Bryce Stadium; Nacogdoches, TX	W 31–6	8,003	
October 7	at Sam Houston State	No. 4	Bowers Stadium; Huntsville, TX (Battle of the Piney Woods)	W 38–22	12,122	
October 14	Nicholls State	No. 4	Homer Bryce Stadium; Nacogdoches, TX	W 56–3		
October 21	at Samford*	No. 4	Seibert Stadium; Homewood, AL	W 31–10	5,042	
October 28	No. 1 McNeese State	No. 3	Homer Bryce Stadium; Nacogdoches, TX	L 16–34	23,617	
November 11	Southwest Texas State	No. 6	Homer Bryce Stadium; Nacogdoches, TX	W 50–21	5,550	
November 16	at No. 21 Northwestern State	No. 5	Harry Turpin Stadium; Natchitoches, LA (rivalry)	W 25–20		
November 25	No. 12 Eastern Illinois*	No. 5	Homer Bryce Stadium; Nacogdoches, TX (NCAA Division I-AA First Round)	W 34–29		
December 2	at No. 2 Appalachian State*	No. 5	Kidd Brewer Stadium; Boone, NC (NCAA Division I-AA Quarterfinal)	W 27–17	8,941	
December 9	at No. 8 Montana*	No. 5	Washington–Grizzly Stadium; Missoula, MT (NCAA Division I-AA Semifinal)	L 14–70	18,523	
*Non-conference game; Rankings from The Sports Network Poll released prior to the game
