= 1995 Central State Marauders football team =

American college football season

1995 Central State Marauders football

NAIA Division I national champion

NAIA Division I Championship, W 37–7 vs. Northeastern State (OK)
- Conference: Independent
- Record: 10–1
- Head coach: Rick Comegy (2nd season)
- Home stadium: McPherson Stadium

1995 NAIA Division I independents football records
	Conf.			Overall
Team	W	L	T	W		L		T
No. 1 Central State (OH) ^		–		10	–	1	–	0
No. 3 Arkansas–Pine Bluff ^		–		6	–	4	–	0
No. 6 Westmar		–		6	–	4	–	0
Harding		–		4	–	6	–	0
Ouachita Baptist		–		2	–	7	–	0
^ – NAIA Division I playoff participant; Rankings from NAIA Division I poll

The 1995 Central State Marauders football team represented Central State University as an independent during the 1995 NAIA Division I football season. Led by second-year head coach Rick Comegy, the Marauders compiled an overall record of 10–1 and finished as NAIA Division I national champions.

== Schedule ==
Date	Opponent	Site	Result	Attendance	Source
September 2	vs. Langston	Ohio Stadium; Columbus, OH (Capital City Classic)	W 28–10	12,000	
September 9	at IUP	Miller Stadium; Indiana, PA	W 20–17		
September 23	at Grambling State	Eddie G. Robinson Memorial Stadium; Grambling, LA	W 16–14	9,435	
September 30	at Eastern Illinois	O'Brien Stadium; Charleston, IL	L 27–33	5,032	
October 7	Knoxville	McPherson Stadium; Wilberforce, OH	W 62–8		
October 14	Mississippi Valley State	McPherson Stadium; Wilberforce, OH	W 59–12	5,150	
October 21	at North Carolina Central	O'Kelly–Riddick Stadium; Durham, NC	W 50–30	2,203	
November 4	at Buffalo	University at Buffalo Stadium; Amherst, NY	W 33–7	1,504	
November 11	Kentucky State	McPherson Stadium; Wilberforce, OH	W 42–6		
November 18	Montana Western	McPherson Stadium; Wilberforce, OH (NAIA Division I Semifinal)	W 49–21		
December 2	at Northeastern State (OK)	Gable Field; Tahlequah, OK (NAIA Division I Championship)	W 37–7	9,500	
