= Manny Michel =

American football player and coach (born 1960)

Biographical details
- Born: February 8, 1960 (age 66); Metairie, Louisiana, U.S.

Playing career
- 1980–1983: Tennessee Tech

Coaching career (HC unless noted)
- 1985: Cumberland County HS (TN) (assistant)
- 1986–1994: John Curtis Christian (LA) (assistant)
- 1995–1998: Nicholls State (DC/DL)
- 1999–2008: Louisiana–Monroe (DL/co-DC)
- 2009–2015: McNeese State (DL)
- 2016–2017: Louisiana-Monroe (DL)
- 2020: LSU (ADL/DA)
- 2026-present: John Curtis Christian (LA) (assistant)

Manny Michel is an American football coach. He has served as a defensive coordinator and defensive line coach during his career.

== Playing career ==
Michel played college football at Tennessee Tech University and is an alumnus of the university.

== Coaching career ==
=== High school career ===
Michel began his coaching career in 1985 as an assistant football coach at Cumberland County High School in Crossville, Tennessee. He was an assistant coach at his alma mater, John Curtis Christian High School in River Ridge, Louisiana from 1986 to 1994. He returned to John Curtis as an assistant defensive line coach in 2026.

=== College career ===
Michel began his college coaching career at Nicholls State University as defensive coordinator and defensive line coach from 1995 to 1998. From 1999 to 2008, Michel became defensive line coach at the University of Louisiana-Monroe and became co-defensive coordinator along with Phil Elmassian in 2008. At ULM, Michel worked under head coaches Bobby Keasler, Mike Collins and Charlie Weatherbie. Starting with the 2009 season, Michel moved to McNeese State University as the defensive line coach and stayed at McNeese State through 2015. Michel returned to the University of Louisiana–Monroe as defensive line coach in 2016 and stayed in that role until retiring after the 2017 season. In 2020, Michel came out of retirement and took a position as assistant defensive line coach and defensive analyst at LSU.
