= 1995 Sam Houston State Bearkats football team =

American college football season

1995 Sam Houston State Bearkats football
- Conference: Southland Conference
- Record: 5–5 (2–3 Southland)
- Head coach: Ron Randleman (14th season)
- Defensive coordinator: Mike Lucas (6th season)
- Home stadium: Bowers Stadium

1995 Southland Conference football standings
	Conf.					Overall
Team	W		L		T	W		L		T
No. 1 McNeese State $^	5	–	0	–	0	13	–	1	–	0
No. 5 Stephen F. Austin ^	4	–	1	–	0	11	–	2	–	0
Northwestern State	2	–	3	–	0	6	–	5	–	0
Sam Houston State	2	–	3	–	0	5	–	5	–	0
Southwest Texas State	2	–	3	–	0	4	–	7	–	0
Nicholls State	0	–	5	–	0	0	–	11	–	0
$ – Conference champion; ^ – NCAA Division I-AA playoff participant; Rankings from The Sports Network poll

The 1995 Sam Houston State Bearkats football team represented Sam Houston State University as a member of the Southland Conference during the 1995 NCAA Division I-AA football season. Led by 14th-year head coach Ron Randleman, the Bearkats compiled an overall record of 5–5 with a mark of 2–3 in conference play, and finished tied for third in the Southland.

== Schedule ==
Date	Opponent	Site	Result	Attendance	Source
September 2	Jacksonville State*	Bowers Stadium; Huntsville, TX	L 13–16	5,913	
September 9	Alcorn State*	Bowers Stadium; Huntsville, TX	W 44–7		
September 16	at No. 3 Boise State*	Bronco Stadium; Boise, ID	L 14–38	23,377	
September 23	Texas A&M–Kingsville*	Bowers Stadium; Huntsville, TX	W 24–23		
September 30	at Texas Southern*	Alexander Durley Sports Complex; Houston, TX	W 24–13	6,481	
October 7	No. 4 Stephen F. Austin	Bowers Stadium; Huntsville, TX (Battle of the Piney Woods)	L 22–38	12,122	
October 14	No. 24 Northwestern State	Bowers Stadium; Huntsville, TX	L 2–24		
October 21	at No. 1 McNeese State	Cowboy Stadium; Lake Charles, LA	L 0–20	15,083	
November 4	at Nicholls State	John L. Guidry Stadium; Thibodaux, LA	W 24–17		
November 18	at Southwest Texas State	Bobcat Stadium; San Marcos, TX (rivalry)	W 26–20	3,307	
*Non-conference game; Rankings from The Sports Network Poll released prior to the game
