= 1995 NAIA Division I football season =

American college football season

- Regular season: August–November 1995
- Postseason: November 18–December 2, 1995
- National Championship: Doc Wadley Stadium; Tahlequah, OK
- Champions: Central State (OH) (3)

The 1995 NAIA Division I football season was the 40th season of college football sponsored by the NAIA, was the 26th season of play of the NAIA's top division for football.

The season was played from August to November 1995 and culminated in the 1995 NAIA Champion Bowl playoffs and the 1995 NAIA Champion Bowl, played this year on December 2, 1995 at Doc Wadley Stadium in Tahlequah, Oklahoma, on the campus of Northeastern State University.

The Central State Marauders defeated the Northeastern State Redmen in the Champion Bowl, 37–7, to win their third NAIA national title. It was the RiverHawks' second consecutive loss in the championship game and the Marauders' third title in six seasons.

== Conference changes and new programs ==
=== Conference changes ===
- The Arkansas Intercollegiate Conference disbanded before the start of the season. Three of its football members—Arkansas Tech, Arkansas–Monticello, and Southern Arkansas—departed for the NCAA Division II's Gulf South Conference. The other two, Harding and Ouachita Baptist, became NAIA Division I independents before joining the Lone Star Conference in 1997.
- This was the final season that the NAIA officially recognized a football champion from the Oklahoma Intercollegiate Conference. The OIC, the second incarnation of a football conference with the same name, completed its final season in 1996 before disbanding.

== Conference standings ==
1995 Frontier Conference football standings
	Conf.					Overall
Team	W		L		T	W		L		T
No. 2 Western Montana $^	6	–	0	–	0	7	–	3	–	0
No. 7 Carroll (MT)	4	–	2	–	0	5	–	4	–	0
Montana Tech	2	–	4	–	0	2	–	7	–	0
Rocky Mountain	0	–	6	–	0	0	–	10	–	0
$ – Conference champion; ^ – NAIA Division I playoff participant; Rankings from NAIA Division I poll

1995 Oklahoma Intercollegiate Conference football standings
	Conf.					Overall
Team	W		L		T	W		L		T
No. 4 Northeastern State $^	4	–	1	–	0	7	–	5	–	0
No. 5 SE Oklahoma State	3	–	2	–	0	7	–	4	–	0
No. 8 NW Oklahoma State	3	–	2	–	0	5	–	5	–	0
No. 9 SW Oklahoma State	2	–	3	–	0	5	–	5	–	0
No. T–10 Langston	2	–	3	–	0	4	–	6	–	0
No. T–10 East Central	1	–	4	–	0	4	–	7	–	0
Panhandle State *	0	–	0	–	0	1	–	9	–	0
+ – Conference co-champions; ^ – NAIA Division I playoff participant * – ineligible for conference title; Rankings from NAIA Division I poll

1995 NAIA Division I independents football records
	Conf.			Overall
Team	W	L	T	W		L		T
No. 1 Central State (OH) ^		–		10	–	1	–	0
No. 3 Arkansas–Pine Bluff ^		–		6	–	4	–	0
No. 6 Westmar		–		6	–	4	–	0
Harding		–		4	–	6	–	0
Ouachita Baptist		–		2	–	7	–	0
^ – NAIA Division I playoff participant; Rankings from NAIA Division I poll

== Conference champions ==
Conference	Champion	Record
Frontier	Montana Western	6–0
Oklahoma	Northeastern State	4–1

== Postseason ==
Semifinals; November 18, 1995; Campus sites
Central State (OH)*	49
Montana Western	21
Northeastern State	17
Arkansas–Pine Bluff*	14

1995 Champion Bowl; December 2, 1995; Tahlequah, OK
Central State (OH)	37
Northeastern State*	7

== See also ==
- 1995 NCAA Division I-A football season
- 1995 NCAA Division I-AA football season
- 1995 NCAA Division II football season
- 1995 NCAA Division III football season
