= 1995 Alabama State Hornets football team =

American college football season

1995 Alabama State Hornets football
- Conference: Southwestern Athletic Conference
- Record: 8–3 (5–2 SWAC)
- Head coach: Houston Markham (9th season)
- Home stadium: Cramton Bowl

1995 Southwestern Athletic Conference football standings
	Conf.			Overall
Team	W		L	W		L
No. 14 Jackson State $^	7	–	0	9	–	3
No. 11 Southern	6	–	1	11	–	1
Alabama State	5	–	2	8	–	3
Grambling State	4	–	3	5	–	6
Alcorn State	3	–	4	4	–	7
Mississippi Valley State	2	–	5	2	–	9
Texas Southern	1	–	6	2	–	8
Prairie View A&M	0	–	7	0	–	11
$ – Conference champion; ^ – NCAA Division I-AA playoff participant; Rankings from The Sports Network Poll

The 1995 Alabama State Hornets football team represented Alabama State University as a member of the Southwestern Athletic Conference (SWAC) during the 1995 NCAA Division I-AA football season. Led by ninth-year head coach Houston Markham, the Hornets compiled an overall record of 8–3, with a mark of 5–2 in conference play, and finished third in the SWAC.

== Schedule ==
Date	Opponent	Site	Result	Attendance	Source
September 2	at UAB*	Legion Field; Birmingham, AL	W 13–3	15,169	
September 9	No. 10 Southern	Cramton Bowl; Montgomery, AL	L 19–29		
September 16	vs. Alcorn State	Ladd Stadium; Mobile, AL (Gulf Coast Classic)	W 20–20 (forfeit win)		
September 23	No. 7 Troy State*	Cramton Bowl; Montgomery, AL	L 10–28		
September 30	vs. Jackson State	Soldier Field; Chicago, IL (Chicago Classic)	L 22–24	36,712	
October 14	at Texas Southern	Robertson Stadium; Houston, TX	W 27–19		
October 21	Prairie View A&M	Cramton Bowl; Montgomery, AL	W 49–16		
October 28	vs. Alabama A&M*	Legion Field; Birmingham, AL (Magic City Classic)	W 37–20		
November 4	Grambling State	Cramton Bowl; Montgomery, AL	W 37–16		
November 11	at Mississippi Valley State	Magnolia Stadium; Itta Bena, MS	W 56–28		
November 23	Tuskegee*	Cramton Bowl; Montgomery, AL (Turkey Day Classic)	W 58–20		
*Non-conference game; Rankings from NCAA Division I-AA Football Committee Poll released prior to the game
