= 1995 Alcorn State Braves football team =

American college football season

1995 Alcorn State Braves football
- Conference: Southwestern Athletic Conference
- Record: 4–7 (3–4 SWAC)
- Head coach: Cardell Jones (5th season)
- Home stadium: Jack Spinks Stadium

1995 Southwestern Athletic Conference football standings
	Conf.			Overall
Team	W		L	W		L
No. 14 Jackson State $^	7	–	0	9	–	3
No. 11 Southern	6	–	1	11	–	1
Alabama State	5	–	2	8	–	3
Grambling State	4	–	3	5	–	6
Alcorn State	3	–	4	4	–	7
Mississippi Valley State	2	–	5	2	–	9
Texas Southern	1	–	6	2	–	8
Prairie View A&M	0	–	7	0	–	11
$ – Conference champion; ^ – NCAA Division I-AA playoff participant; Rankings from The Sports Network Poll

The 1995 Alcorn State Braves football team represented Alcorn State University as a member of the Southwestern Athletic Conference (SWAC) during the 1995 NCAA Division I-AA football season. Led by fifth-year head coach Cardell Jones, the Braves compiled an overall record of 4–7 with a conference record of 3–4, and finished fifth in the SWAC.

== Schedule ==
Date	Opponent	Site	Result	Attendance	Source
September 2	Grambling State	Jack Spinks Stadium; Lorman, MS	L 17–39		
September 9	at Sam Houston State*	Bowers Stadium; Huntsville, TX	L 7–44		
September 16	vs. Alabama State	Ladd Stadium; Mobile, AL (Gulf Coast Classic)	L 20–20 (forfeit)		
September 23	at Texas Southern	Robertson Stadium; Houston, TX	W 21–10		
September 30	at Arkansas–Pine Bluff*	Pumphrey Stadium; Pine Bluff, AR	W 44–28		
October 7	vs. Howard*	RCA Dome; Indianapolis, IN (Circle City Classic)	L 17–21	58,438	
October 14	Prairie View A&M	Jack Spinks Stadium; Lorman, MS	W 13–2		
October 21	at No. 13 Southern	A. W. Mumford Stadium; Baton Rouge, LA	L 51–61		
October 28	Samford*	Jack Spinks Stadium; Lorman, MS	L 9–20		
November 4	Mississippi Valley State	Jack Spinks Stadium; Lorman, MS	W 38–27		
November 18	at No. 14 Jackson State	Mississippi Veterans Memorial Stadium; Jackson, MS (Capital City Classic)	L 7–28	55,300	
*Non-conference game; Rankings from NCAA Division I-AA Football Committee Poll released prior to the game

== Personnel ==
=== Coaching staff ===
The 1995 Alcorn State Braves football team was led by head coach Cardell Jones in his fifth season with the program. A native of McComb, Mississippi, and a 1965 graduate of Alcorn State University, Jones began his coaching career at the high school level before serving as an assistant at Jackson State University and returning to his alma mater as head coach in 1991.

In the 1995 season, Jones guided the Braves to an overall record of 31-12-2, including strong performances in the Southwestern Athletic Conference (SWAC) such as the 1992 conference championship, for which he earned SWAC Coach of the Year Honors. His tenure provided stability to the program following the departure of star quarterback Steve McNair after the 1994 season.

=== Key players ===
The roster featured a mix of upperclassmen and experienced returners following the departure of star quarterback Steve McNair after the 1994 season, emphasizing a run-oriented offense supported by a strong offensive line and a defense bolstered by standout linebackers and return specialists. Exact positions and breakdowns are not fully documented, but the team relied on a core group of seniors across key units, including multiple starters on the offensive line, wide receivers, running backs, defensive linemen, and defensive backs, reflecting a veteran-heavy lineup under head coach Cardell Jones.

Key offensive players included senior wide receiver Kobie Jenkins, a 6-3, 206-pound All-SAC selection who served as the team's primary aerial threat with his size and route-running ability. Senior offensive lineman Kewone Robinson, at 6-3 and 274 pounds, anchored the line as a two-year starter and All-SWAC honoree, providing crucial blocking for the ground game. The backfield was led by senior fullback Bertrell Shelby and tailback Estus Sands, both returning starters who formed a potent rushing duo in the team's shift to a run-heavy scheme after quarterback injuries.

On defense, senior linebacker Frederick Harper, a 6-2, 201-pound standout, emerged as the unit's leader with his tackling prowess. Senior defensive lineman Carlos Thornton, measuring 6-3 and 266 pounds, provided interior pressure as an All-SWAC performer. In the secondary, senior defensive back Malcolm Jones (5-11, 185 pounds) contributed as an All-SWAC selection with coverage skills that drew professional interest. Additionally, junior return specialist Goree White, a 5-10, 172-pound All-SWAC honoree nicknamed "The Nightmare," handled kickoff and punt returns, adding explosive playmaking to the special teams unit as a first-team All-SWAC honoree.
