= 1995 Grambling State Tigers football team =

American college football season

1995 Grambling State Tigers football
- Conference: Southwestern Athletic Conference
- Record: 5–6 (4–3 SWAC)
- Head coach: Eddie Robinson (53rd season)
- Home stadium: Eddie G. Robinson Memorial Stadium

1995 Southwestern Athletic Conference football standings
	Conf.			Overall
Team	W		L	W		L
No. 14 Jackson State $^	7	–	0	9	–	3
No. 11 Southern	6	–	1	11	–	1
Alabama State	5	–	2	8	–	3
Grambling State	4	–	3	5	–	6
Alcorn State	3	–	4	4	–	7
Mississippi Valley State	2	–	5	2	–	9
Texas Southern	1	–	6	2	–	8
Prairie View A&M	0	–	7	0	–	11
$ – Conference champion; ^ – NCAA Division I-AA playoff participant; Rankings from The Sports Network Poll

The 1995 Grambling State Tigers football team represented Grambling State University as a member of the Southwestern Athletic Conference (SWAC) during the 1995 NCAA Division I-AA football season. Led by 53rd-year head coach Eddie Robinson, the Tigers compiled an overall record of 5–6 and a mark of 4–3 in conference play, and finished fourth in the SWAC.

The Tigers' 42–6 victory over Mississippi Valley State was the 400th all-time win for Coach Robinson.

== Schedule ==
Date	Opponent	Site	Result	Attendance	Source
September 2	at Alcorn State	Jack Spinks Stadium; Lorman, MS	W 39–17		
September 16	vs. Hampton*	Giants Stadium; East Rutherford, NJ (Whitney Young Memorial Classic)	L 7–16	61,023	
September 23	Central State (OH)*	Eddie G. Robinson Memorial Stadium; Grambling, LA	L 14–16	9,435	
September 30	vs. Prairie View A&M	Cotton Bowl; Dallas, TX (rivalry)	W 64–0	63,425	
October 7	Mississippi Valley State	Eddie G. Robinson Memorial Stadium; Grambling, LA	W 42–6	11,500	
October 14	vs. Arkansas–Pine Bluff*	Independence Stadium; Shreveport, LA (Red River Classic)	L 14–17		
October 21	at Jackson State	Mississippi Veterans Memorial Stadium; Jackson, MS	L 28–29	11,888	
October 28	Texas Southern	Eddie G. Robinson Memorial Stadium; Grambling, LA	W 56–14		
November 4	at Alabama State	Cramton Bowl; Montgomery, AL	L 16–37		
November 11	Elizabeth City State*	Eddie G. Robinson Memorial Stadium; Grambling, LA	W 48–8	3,350	
November 25	vs. Southern	Louisiana Superdome; New Orleans, LA (Bayou Classic)	L 14–30	67,351	
*Non-conference game
