= Sean Boyd (American football) =

American football player (born 1972)

No. 42
- Position: Safety

Personal information
- Born: December 19, 1972 (age 53); Gastonia, North Carolina, U.S.
- Listed height: 6 ft 2 in (1.88 m)
- Listed weight: 206 lb (93 kg)

Career information
- High school: Ashbrook (Gastonia)
- College: North Carolina (1991–1995)
- NFL draft: 1996: 5th round, 148th overall pick

Career history
- Minnesota Vikings (1996)*; Atlanta Falcons (1996–1997); Green Bay Packers (1997)*
- * Offseason or practice squad member only

Awards and highlights
- Third-team All-ACC (1993)

Career NFL statistics
- Games played: 2
- Tackles: 3
- Stats at Pro Football Reference

Sean Lefell Boyd (born December 19, 1972) is an American former professional football safety who played for the Atlanta Falcons of the National Football League (NFL). He played college football for the North Carolina Tar Heels.

== Early life ==
Boyd was born on December 19, 1972, in Gastonia, North Carolina. He attended Ashbrook High School in Gastonia. As a senior, Boyd caught 12 passes for 243 yards with four touchdowns and had 84 tackles with eight sacks on defense.

== College career ==
Boyd played college football for the North Carolina Tar Heels from 1991 to 1995 and was a four-year letterman from 1992 to 1995. As a senior, he had a career-high 18 tackles in the season opener against Syracuse. Boyd logged seven interceptions in his career and earned third-team All-Atlantic Coast Conference honors in 1993.

== Professional career ==
=== Minnesota Vikings ===
Boyd was selected in the fifth round, with the 148th overall selection, by the Minnesota Vikings in the 1996 NFL draft. On July 21, he signed his rookie contract with the team. On August 25, Boyd was released and then signed to the practice squad the following day.

=== Atlanta Falcons ===
On October 26, 1996, Boyd was signed off the Vikings' practice squad by the Atlanta Falcons. He played in two games on special teams, recording three tackles. On July 17, 1997, Boyd was waived by the team.

=== Green Bay Packers ===
On July 18, 1997, the Green Bay Packers claimed Boyd off waivers. On August 5, he was waived by the team.
