= William A. Thomas =

American football player and coach (1948–2019)

Biographical details
- Born: October 21, 1948
- Died: January 18, 2019 (aged 70); Houston, Texas, U.S.

Playing career
- 1967–1970: Tennessee State
- Position: Linebacker

Coaching career (HC unless noted)
- 1971–1983: Tennessee State (assistant)
- 1984–1988: Tennessee State
- 1994–2003: Texas Southern

Administrative career (AD unless noted)
- 1986–1994: Tennessee State

Head coaching record
- Overall: 84–78–3
- Tournaments: 1–1 (NCAA D-I-AA playoffs)

William A. Thomas (October 21, 1948 – January 18, 2019) was an American college football coach and athletics administrator. He served as the head football at Tennessee State University in Nashville, Tennessee from 1984 to 1988 and Texas Southern University in Houston, Texas from 1994 to 2003, compiling a career head coaching record of 84–78–3. Thomas was also the athletic director at Tennessee State from 1986 to 1994.

== Head coaching record ==
| Year | Team | Overall | Conference | Standing | Bowl/playoffs | NCAA^{#} |
|---|---|---|---|---|---|---|
Tennessee State Tigers (NCAA Division I-AA independent) (1984–1987)
| 1984 | Tennessee State | 11–0 | | | | |
| 1985 | Tennessee State | 7–4 | | | | |
| 1986 | Tennessee State | 10–2–1 | | | L NCAA Division I-AA Quarterfinal | 14 |
| 1987 | Tennessee State | 3–7–1 | | | | |
Tennessee State Tigers (Ohio Valley Conference) (1988)
| 1988 | Tennessee State | 3–7–1 | 2–4 | T–4th | | |
| Tennessee State: | | 34–20–3 | 2–4 | | | |
Texas Southern Tigers (Southwestern Athletic Conference) (1994–2003)
| 1994 | Texas Southern | 4–7 | 2–5 | T–6th | | |
| 1995 | Texas Southern | 2–8 | 1–6 | 7th | | |
| 1996 | Texas Southern | 7–4 | 5–2 | T–2nd | | |
| 1997 | Texas Southern | 5–6 | 4–4 | T–4th | | |
| 1998 | Texas Southern | 6–5 | 4–4 | T–4th | | |
| 1999 | Texas Southern | 6–5 | 3–1 | 2nd (West) | | |
| 2000 | Texas Southern | 8–3 | 5–2 | 2nd (West) | | |
| 2001 | Texas Southern | 3–7 | 2–5 | T–3rd (West) | | |
| 2002 | Texas Southern | 4–7 | 3–4 | 3rd (West) | | |
| 2003 | Texas Southern | 5–6 | 3–4 | T–3rd (West) | | |
| Texas Southern: | | 50–58 | 32–37 | | | |
| Total: | | 84–78–3 | | | | |
