= 1995 McNeese State Cowboys football team =

American college football season

1995 McNeese State Cowboys football

Southland champion

NCAA Division I-AA Semifinal, L 13–25 vs. Marshall
- Conference: Southland Conference

Ranking
- Sports Network: No. 1
- Record: 13–1 (5–0 Southland)
- Head coach: Bobby Keasler (6th season)
- Offensive coordinator: Mike Santiago (6th season)
- Defensive coordinator: Kirby Bruchhaus (6th season)
- Home stadium: Cowboy Stadium

1995 Southland Conference football standings
	Conf.					Overall
Team	W		L		T	W		L		T
No. 1 McNeese State $^	5	–	0	–	0	13	–	1	–	0
No. 5 Stephen F. Austin ^	4	–	1	–	0	11	–	2	–	0
Northwestern State	2	–	3	–	0	6	–	5	–	0
Sam Houston State	2	–	3	–	0	5	–	5	–	0
Southwest Texas State	2	–	3	–	0	4	–	7	–	0
Nicholls State	0	–	5	–	0	0	–	11	–	0
$ – Conference champion; ^ – NCAA Division I-AA playoff participant; Rankings from The Sports Network poll

The 1995 McNeese State Cowboys football team was an American football team that represented McNeese State University as a member of the Southland Conference (Southland) during the 1995 NCAA Division I-AA football season. In their sixth year under head coach Bobby Keasler, the team compiled an overall record of 13–1, with a mark of 5–0 in conference play, and finished as Southland champions. The Cowboys advanced to the Division I-AA playoffs and lost to Marshall in the semifinals.

== Schedule ==
Date	Opponent	Rank	Site	Result	Attendance	Source
September 2	at Southwest Missouri State*	No. 3	Plaster Sports Complex; Springfield, MO	W 31–2	13,794	
September 9	Southeastern Oklahoma State*	No. 1	Cowboy Stadium; Lake Charles, LA	W 45–10	16,860	
September 16	at No. 6 James Madison*	No. 1	Bridgeforth Stadium; Harrisonburg, VA	W 30–24	11,000	
September 23	No. 14 Youngstown State*	No. 1	Cowboy Stadium; Lake Charles, LA	W 31–3	20,290	
September 30	UCF*	No. 1	Cowboy Stadium; Lake Charles, LA	W 49–7	16,921	
October 14	Portland State*	No. 1	Cowboy Stadium; Lake Charles, LA	W 27–14	14,264	
October 21	Sam Houston State	No. 1	Cowboy Stadium; Lake Charles, LA	W 20–0	15,083	
October 28	at No. 3 Stephen F. Austin	No. 1	Homer Bryce Stadium; Nacogdoches, TX	W 34–16	23,617	
November 4	at Southwest Texas State	No. 1	Bobcat Stadium; San Marcos, TX	W 28–7		
November 11	No. 19 Northwestern State	No. 1	Cowboy Stadium; Lake Charles, LA (rivalry)	W 20–10		
November 18	at Nicholls State	No. 1	John L. Guidry Stadium; Thibodaux, LA	W 31–6	3,061	
November 25	No. 17 Idaho*	No. 1	Cowboy Stadium; Lake Charles, LA (NCAA Division I-AA First Round)	W 33–3	15,736	
December 2	No. 7 Delaware*	No. 1	Cowboy Stadium; Lake Charles, LA (NCAA Division I-AA Quarterfinal)	W 52–18	17,239	
December 9	No. 6 Marshall*	No. 1	Cowboy Stadium; Lake Charles, LA (NCAA Division I-AA Semifinal)	L 13–25	18,018	
*Non-conference game; Rankings from The Sports Network Poll released prior to the game

== Roster ==
1995 McNeese State Cowboys football team roster
Players
Coaches
Offense

Pos.	#	Name	Class

Defense

Pos.	#	Name	Class
DB		Delphfrine Lee	So
DE	96	Kavika Pittman	Sr
S		Jason Rollins

Special teams

Pos.	#	Name	Class

Head coach

- Bobby Keasler

Coordinators/assistant coaches

Legend

- (C) Team captain
- (S) Suspended
- (I) Ineligible
- Injured
- Redshirt
