= 1995 North Alabama Lions football team =

American college football season

1995 North Alabama Lions football

NCAA Division II champion GSC champion

NCAA Division II Championship Game, W 27–7 vs. Pittsburg State
- Conference: Gulf South Conference
- Record: 14–0 (8–0 GSC)
- Head coach: Bobby Wallace (8th season)
- Offensive coordinator: Willie J. Slater (4th season)
- Defensive coordinator: Bill Hyde (15th season)
- Home stadium: Braly Municipal Stadium

1995 Gulf South Conference football standings
	Conf.					Overall
Team	W		L		T	W		L		T
No. 1 North Alabama $^	8	–	0	–	0	14	–	0	–	0
No. 17 West Georgia ^	7	–	1	–	0	8	–	3	–	0
Central Arkansas	6	–	3	–	0	7	–	4	–	0
Henderson State	6	–	3	–	0	6	–	5	–	0
Valdosta State	4	–	3	–	0	6	–	5	–	0
Delta State	5	–	4	–	0	5	–	6	–	0
Arkansas–Monticello	3	–	3	–	0	6	–	5	–	0
Arkansas Tech	2	–	6	–	1	3	–	6	–	1
Mississippi College	2	–	7	–	1	2	–	7	–	1
Southern Arkansas	1	–	6	–	0	4	–	6	–	0
West Alabama	0	–	8	–	0	2	–	9	–	0
$ – Conference champion; ^ – NCAA Division II playoff participant; Rankings from NCAA Division II Football Committee poll

The 1995 North Alabama Lions football team represented the University of North Alabama during the 1995 NCAA Division II football season, and completed the 63rd season of Lions football. The Lions played their home games at Braly Municipal Stadium in Florence Alabama. The team was led by coach Bobby Wallace. The team finished the regular season with an undefeated 10–0 record and made the NCAA Division II playoffs. The Lions defeated the Pittsburg State Gorillas 27–7 in the National Championship Game en route to the program's third consecutive NCAA Division II Football Championship.

== Schedule ==
Date	Opponent	Rank	Site	Result	Attendance	Source
September 2	No. 7 Albany State*	No. 1	Braly Municipal Stadium; Florence, AL	W 41–13	10,394	
September 9	at Alabama A&M*	No. 1	Milton Frank Stadium; Huntsville, AL	W 49–0	11,238	
September 23	at Delta State	No. 1	Travis E. Parker Field; Cleveland, MS	W 30–0	5,614	
September 30	at Mississippi College	No. 1	Robinson-Hale Stadium; Clinton, MS	W 41–3	6,208	
October 7	West Georgia	No. 1	Braly Municipal Stadium; Florence, AL	W 34–19	10,014	
October 14	at Central Arkansas	No. 1	Estes Stadium; Conway, AR	W 28–7	6,514	
October 21	Henderson State	No. 1	Braly Municipal Stadium; Florence, AL	W 33–28	6,064	
October 28	Valdosta State	No. 1	Braly Municipal Stadium; Florence, AL	W 26–9	8,303	
November 4	at Arkansas Tech	No. 1	Thone Stadium; Russellville, AR	W 52–17	4,103	
November 11	West Alabama	No. 1	Braly Municipal Stadium; Florence, AL (rivalry)	W 42–10	3,160	
November 18	No. 12 Albany State*	No. 1	Braly Municipal Stadium; Florence, AL (NCAA Division II First Round)	W 38–28	3,717	
November 25	No. 6 Carson–Newman*	No. 1	Braly Municipal Stadium; Florence, AL (NCAA Division II Quarterfinal)	W 28–7	6,349	
December 2	No. 3 Ferris State*	No. 1	Braly Municipal Stadium; Florence, AL (NCAA Division II Semifinal)	W 45–7	7,866	
December 9	No. 4 Pittsburg State*	No. 1	Braly Municipal Stadium; Florence, AL (NCAA Division II Championship)	W 27–7	15,241	
*Non-conference game; Rankings from NCAA Division II Football Committee Poll released prior to the game; Source:
