= 1995 Southern Jaguars football team =

American college football season

1995 Southern Jaguars football

Black college national champion

Heritage Bowl, W 30–25 vs. Florida A&M
- Conference: Southwestern Athletic Conference
- Record: 11–1 (6–1 SWAC)
- Head coach: Pete Richardson (3rd season)
- Home stadium: A. W. Mumford Stadium

1995 Southwestern Athletic Conference football standings
| | Conf. | | | Overall |
| Team | W | | L | W | | L |
|---|---|---|---|---|---|---|
| No. 14 Jackson State $^ | 7 | – | 0 | 9 | – | 3 |
| No. 11 Southern | 6 | – | 1 | 11 | – | 1 |
| Alabama State | 5 | – | 2 | 8 | – | 3 |
| Grambling State | 4 | – | 3 | 5 | – | 6 |
| Alcorn State | 3 | – | 4 | 4 | – | 7 |
| Mississippi Valley State | 2 | – | 5 | 2 | – | 9 |
| Texas Southern | 1 | – | 6 | 2 | – | 8 |
| Prairie View A&M | 0 | – | 7 | 0 | – | 11 |
$ – Conference champion; ^ – NCAA Division I-AA playoff participant; Rankings from The Sports Network Poll

The 1995 Southern Jaguars football team represented Southern University as a member of the Southwestern Athletic Conference (SWAC) during the 1995 NCAA Division I-AA football season. Led by third-year head coach Pete Richardson, the Jaguars compiled an overall record of 11–1, with a conference record of 6–1, and finished second in the SWAC. At the conclusion of the season, the Jaguars were also recognized as black college national champion.

== Schedule ==
| Date | Opponent | Rank | Site | Result | Attendance | Source |
|---|---|---|---|---|---|---|
| September 2 | Northwestern State* | No. 10 | A. W. Mumford Stadium; Baton Rouge, LA | W 13–7 | 19,106 | |
| September 9 | at Alabama State | No. 10 | Cramton Bowl; Montgomery, AL | W 29–19 | | |
| September 16 | Prairie View A&M | No. 10 | A. W. Mumford Stadium; Baton Rouge, LA | W 68–6 | | |
| September 23 | Hampton* | No. 10 | A. W. Mumford Stadium; Baton Rouge, LA | W 45–22 | 22,664 | |
| September 30 | at Mississippi Valley State | No. 9 | Magnolia Stadium; Itta Bena, MS | W 44–6 | | |
| October 14 | at Jackson State | No. 10 | Mississippi Veterans Memorial Stadium; Jackson, MS (rivalry) | L 14–16 | 57,376 | |
| October 21 | Alcorn State | No. 13 | A. W. Mumford Stadium; Baton Rouge, LA | W 61–51 | | |
| October 28 | Nicholls State* | No. 13 | A. W. Mumford Stadium; Baton Rouge, LA | W 41–3 | | |
| November 4 | vs. No. 14 Florida A&M* | No. 12 | Georgia Dome; Atlanta, GA | W 52–38 | 33,700 | |
| November 11 | at Texas Southern | No. 11 | Robertson Stadium; Houston, TX | W 48–13 | | |
| November 25 | vs. Grambling State | No. 11 | Louisiana Superdome; New Orleans, LA (Bayou Classic) | W 30–14 | 67,351 | |
| December 29 | vs. No. 16 Florida A&M* | No. 11 | Georgia Dome; Atlanta, GA (Heritage Bowl) | W 30–25 | 25,164 | |
*Non-conference game; Rankings from NCAA Division I-AA Football Committee Poll released prior to the game
