= List of Division I FBS independents football standings (1973–present) =

This is an era-list of yearly standings of the highest level of college football, including NCAA Division I FBS independent schools football standings.

== College independents standings ==
=== NCAA Division I ===
1973 NCAA Division I independents football records
	Conf.			Overall
Team	W	L	T	W		L		T
No. 1 Notre Dame		–		11	–	0	–	0
No. 5 Penn State		–		12	–	0	–	0
No. 9 Houston		–		11	–	1	–	0
Temple		–		9	–	1	–	0
No. 20 Tulane		–		9	–	3	–	0
Memphis State		–		8	–	3	–	0
Tampa		–		8	–	3	–	0
Boston College		–		7	–	4	–	0
South Carolina		–		7	–	4	–	0
Utah State		–		7	–	4	–	0
Air Force		–		6	–	4	–	0
Southern Miss		–		6	–	4	–	1
Northern Illinois		–		6	–	5	–	0
Rutgers		–		6	–	5	–	0
West Virginia		–		6	–	5	–	0
Pittsburgh		–		6	–	5	–	1
Colgate		–		5	–	5	–	0
Dayton		–		5	–	5	–	1
Xavier		–		5	–	5	–	1
Georgia Tech		–		5	–	6	–	0
Holy Cross		–		5	–	6	–	0
Miami (FL)		–		5	–	6	–	0
Cincinnati		–		4	–	7	–	0
Marshall		–		4	–	7	–	0
Navy		–		4	–	7	–	0
Southern Illinois		–		3	–	7	–	1
Villanova		–		3	–	8	–	0
Syracuse		–		2	–	9	–	0
Virginia Tech		–		2	–	9	–	0
Army		–		0	–	10	–	0
Florida State		–		0	–	11	–	0
Rankings from AP Poll

1976 NCAA Division I independents football records
	Conf.			Overall
Team	W	L	T	W		L		T
No. 1 Pittsburgh		–		12	–	0	–	0
No. 17 Rutgers		–		11	–	0	–	0
San Diego State		–		10	–	1	–	0
No. 12 Notre Dame		–		9	–	3	–	0
Colgate		–		8	–	2	–	0
Boston College		–		8	–	3	–	0
Cincinnati		–		8	–	3	–	0
Memphis State		–		7	–	4	–	0
North Texas State *		–		7	–	4	–	0
Southern Illinois		–		7	–	4	–	0
Penn State		–		7	–	5	–	0
Villanova		–		6	–	4	–	1
South Carolina		–		6	–	5	–	0
Virginia Tech		–		6	–	5	–	0
Army		–		5	–	6	–	0
Florida State		–		5	–	6	–	0
Illinois State		–		5	–	6	–	0
Richmond		–		5	–	6	–	0
West Virginia		–		5	–	6	–	0
Georgia Tech		–		4	–	6	–	1
Temple		–		4	–	6	–	0
Air Force		–		4	–	7	–	0
Dayton		–		4	–	7	–	0
Louisville		–		4	–	7	–	0
Marshall		–		4	–	7	–	0
Navy		–		4	–	7	–	0
Indiana State		–		3	–	7	–	0
Hawaii		–		3	–	8	–	0
Holy Cross		–		3	–	8	–	0
Miami (FL)		–		3	–	8	–	0
Syracuse		–		3	–	8	–	0
Utah State		–		3	–	8	–	0
Northeast Louisiana		–		2	–	9	–	0
Southern Miss		–		2	–	9	–	0
Tulane		–		2	–	9	–	0
North Texas State (originally 6–5) was awarded a forfeit win after Mississippi State was found to be using an ineligible player.; Rankings from AP Poll

1974 NCAA Division I independents football records
	Conf.			Overall
Team	W	L	T	W		L		T
No. 6 Notre Dame		–		10	–	2	–	0
No. 7 Penn State		–		10	–	2	–	0
Temple		–		8	–	2	–	0
Boston College		–		8	–	3	–	0
Utah State		–		8	–	3	–	0
No. 19 Houston		–		8	–	3	–	1
Rutgers		–		7	–	3	–	1
Cincinnati		–		7	–	4	–	0
Memphis State		–		7	–	4	–	0
Pittsburgh		–		7	–	4	–	0
Georgia Tech		–		6	–	5	–	0
Hawaii		–		6	–	5	–	0
Miami (FL)		–		6	–	5	–	0
Southern Miss		–		6	–	5	–	0
Tampa		–		6	–	5	–	0
Holy Cross		–		5	–	5	–	1
Tulane		–		5	–	6	–	0
Colgate		–		4	–	6	–	0
Northern Illinois		–		4	–	7	–	0
Navy		–		4	–	7	–	0
South Carolina		–		4	–	7	–	0
Virginia Tech		–		4	–	7	–	0
West Virginia		–		4	–	7	–	0
Army		–		3	–	8	–	0
Dayton		–		3	–	8	–	0
Villanova		–		3	–	8	–	0
Air Force		–		2	–	9	–	0
Southern Illinois		–		2	–	9	–	0
Syracuse		–		2	–	9	–	0
Florida State		–		1	–	10	–	0
Marshall		–		1	–	10	–	0
Rankings from AP Poll

1977 NCAA Division I independents football records
	Conf.					Overall
Team	W		L		T	W		L		T
No. 1 Notre Dame		–		–		11	–	1	–	0
No. 5 Penn State		–		–		11	–	1	–	0
Colgate		–		–		10	–	1	–	0
North Texas State *		–		–		10	–	1	–	0
No. 16 San Diego State		–		–		10	–	1	–	0
Tennessee State		–		–		8	–	1	–	1
No. 14 Florida State		–		–		10	–	2	–	0
No. 8 Pittsburgh		–		–		9	–	2	–	1
East Carolina		–		–		8	–	3	–	0
Rutgers		–		–		8	–	3	–	0
Army		–		–		7	–	4	–	0
Louisville		–		–		7	–	4	–	1
Boston College		–		–		6	–	5	–	0
Cincinnati		–		–		5	–	4	–	2
Georgia Tech		–		–		6	–	5	–	0
Memphis State		–		–		6	–	5	–	0
Northwestern State		–		–		6	–	5	–	0
Syracuse		–		–		6	–	5	–	0
William & Mary		–		–		6	–	5	–	0
Southern Miss		–		–		6	–	5	–	0
Temple		–		–		5	–	5	–	1
Hawaii		–		–		5	–	6	–	0
Navy		–		–		5	–	6	–	0
West Virginia		–		–		5	–	6	–	0
South Carolina		–		–		5	–	7	–	0
Utah State		–		–		4	–	7	–	0
Villanova		–		–		4	–	7	–	0
Illinois State		–		–		3	–	7	–	1
Virginia Tech		–		–		3	–	7	–	1
Miami (FL)		–		–		3	–	8	–	0
Richmond		–		–		3	–	8	–	0
Tulane		–		–		3	–	8	–	0
Air Force		–		–		2	–	8	–	1
Holy Cross		–		–		2	–	8	–	0
Northeast Louisiana		–		–		2	–	9	–	0
North Texas State (originally 9–2) awarded a forfeit win after Mississippi State was found to be using an ineligible player.; Rankings from AP Poll

1975 NCAA Division I independents football records
	Conf.			Overall
Team	W	L	T	W		L		T
Rutgers		–		9	–	2	–	0
No. 10 Penn State		–		9	–	3	–	0
No. 20 West Virginia		–		9	–	3	–	0
Notre Dame		–		8	–	3	–	0
Virginia Tech		–		8	–	3	–	0
No. 15 Pittsburgh		–		8	–	4	–	0
Boston College		–		7	–	4	–	0
Georgia Tech		–		7	–	4	–	0
Memphis State		–		7	–	4	–	0
Navy		–		7	–	4	–	0
North Texas State		–		7	–	4	–	0
Southern Miss		–		7	–	4	–	0
South Carolina		–		7	–	5	–	0
Colgate		–		6	–	4	–	0
Cincinnati		–		6	–	5	–	0
Hawaii		–		6	–	5	–	0
Syracuse		–		6	–	5	–	0
Temple		–		6	–	5	–	0
Utah State		–		6	–	5	–	0
Dayton		–		5	–	6	–	0
Northeast Louisiana		–		4	–	6	–	1
Tulane		–		4	–	7	–	0
Villanova		–		4	–	7	–	0
Florida State		–		3	–	8	–	0
Air Force		–		2	–	8	–	1
Houston		–		2	–	8	–	0
Miami (FL)		–		2	–	8	–	0
Army		–		2	–	9	–	0
Marshall		–		2	–	9	–	0
Southern Illinois		–		1	–	9	–	1
Holy Cross		–		1	–	10	–	0
Louisville		–		1	–	10	–	0
Rankings from AP Poll

=== NCAA Division I-A ===
1978 NCAA Division I-A independents football records
	Conf.					Overall
Team	W		L		T	W		L		T
No. 4 Penn State		–		–		11	–	1	–	0
North Texas State		–		–		9	–	2	–	0
East Carolina		–		–		9	–	3	–	0
Navy		–		–		9	–	3	–	0
No. 7 Notre Dame		–		–		9	–	3	–	0
Rutgers		–		–		9	–	3	–	0
Florida State		–		–		8	–	3	–	0
Tennessee State		–		–		8	–	3	–	0
Temple		–		–		7	–	3	–	1
Pittsburgh		–		–		8	–	4	–	0
Holy Cross		–		–		7	–	4	–	0
Louisville		–		–		7	–	4	–	0
UNLV		–		–		7	–	4	–	0
Southern Miss		–		–		7	–	4	–	0
Northeast Louisiana		–		–		6	–	4	–	1
Georgia Tech		–		–		7	–	5	–	0
Hawaii		–		–		6	–	5	–	0
Miami (FL)		–		–		6	–	5	–	0
South Carolina		–		–		5	–	5	–	1
William & Mary		–		–		5	–	5	–	1
Cincinnati		–		–		5	–	6	–	0
Villanova		–		–		5	–	6	–	0
Army		–		–		4	–	6	–	1
Memphis State		–		–		4	–	7	–	0
Tulane		–		–		4	–	7	–	0
Virginia Tech		–		–		4	–	7	–	0
Air Force		–		–		3	–	8	–	0
Colgate		–		–		3	–	8	–	0
Richmond		–		–		3	–	8	–	0
Syracuse		–		–		3	–	8	–	0
Illinois State		–		–		2	–	9	–	0
West Virginia		–		–		2	–	9	–	0
Boston College		–		–		0	–	11	–	0
Rankings from AP Poll

1979 NCAA Division I-A independents football records
	Conf.					Overall
Team	W		L		T	W		L		T
No. 6 Florida State		–		–		11	–	1	–	0
No. 7 Pittsburgh		–		–		11	–	1	–	0
UNLV		–		–		9	–	1	–	2
No. 17 Temple		–		–		10	–	2	–	0
Tulane		–		–		9	–	3	–	0
Rutgers		–		–		8	–	3	–	0
Tennessee State		–		–		8	–	3	–	0
East Carolina		–		–		7	–	3	–	1
No. 20 Penn State		–		–		8	–	4	–	0
South Carolina		–		–		8	–	4	–	0
Navy		–		–		7	–	4	–	0
Notre Dame		–		–		7	–	4	–	0
Southern Miss		–		–		6	–	4	–	1
Syracuse		–		–		7	–	5	–	0
Colgate		–		–		5	–	4	–	1
Boston College		–		–		5	–	6	–	0
Holy Cross		–		–		5	–	6	–	0
Memphis State		–		–		5	–	6	–	0
Miami (FL)		–		–		5	–	6	–	0
North Texas State		–		–		5	–	6	–	0
Villanova		–		–		5	–	6	–	0
Virginia Tech		–		–		5	–	6	–	0
West Virginia		–		–		5	–	6	–	0
Georgia Tech		–		–		4	–	6	–	1
Louisville		–		–		4	–	6	–	1
William & Mary		–		–		4	–	7	–	0
Illinois State		–		–		3	–	8	–	0
Northeast Louisiana		–		–		3	–	8	–	0
Army		–		–		2	–	8	–	1
Air Force		–		–		2	–	9	–	0
Cincinnati		–		–		2	–	9	–	0
Richmond		–		–		0	–	11	–	0
Rankings from AP Poll

1980 NCAA Division I-A independents football records
	Conf.					Overall
Team	W		L		T	W		L		T
No. 2 Pittsburgh		–		–		11	–	1	–	0
Tennessee State		–		–		9	–	1	–	0
No. 5 Florida State		–		–		10	–	2	–	0
No. 8 Penn State		–		–		10	–	2	–	0
No. 9 Notre Dame		–		–		9	–	2	–	1
No. 18 Miami (FL)		–		–		9	–	3	–	0
Southern Miss		–		–		9	–	3	–	0
Navy		–		–		8	–	4	–	0
South Carolina		–		–		8	–	4	–	0
Virginia Tech		–		–		8	–	4	–	0
Boston College		–		–		7	–	4	–	0
Northeast Louisiana		–		–		7	–	4	–	0
Rutgers		–		–		7	–	4	–	0
UNLV		–		–		7	–	4	–	0
Tulane		–		–		7	–	5	–	0
Colgate		–		–		5	–	4	–	1
North Texas State		–		–		6	–	5	–	0
Villanova		–		–		6	–	5	–	0
West Virginia		–		–		6	–	6	–	0
Louisville		–		–		5	–	6	–	0
Richmond		–		–		5	–	6	–	0
Syracuse		–		–		5	–	6	–	0
East Carolina		–		–		4	–	7	–	0
Illinois State		–		–		4	–	7	–	0
Temple		–		–		4	–	7	–	0
Army		–		–		3	–	7	–	1
Holy Cross		–		–		3	–	8	–	0
Cincinnati		–		–		2	–	9	–	0
Memphis State		–		–		2	–	9	–	0
William & Mary		–		–		2	–	9	–	0
Georgia Tech		–		–		1	–	9	–	1
Rankings from AP Poll

1981 NCAA Division I-A independents football records
	Conf.					Overall
Team	W		L		T	W		L		T
No. 4 Pittsburgh		–		–		11	–	1	–	0
No. 3 Penn State		–		–		10	–	2	–	0
No. 8 Miami (FL)		–		–		9	–	2	–	0
Southern Miss		–		–		9	–	2	–	1
No. 17 West Virginia		–		–		9	–	3	–	0
Colgate		–		–		7	–	3	–	0
Virginia Tech		–		–		7	–	4	–	0
Navy		–		–		7	–	4	–	1
Cincinnati		–		–		6	–	5	–	0
Florida State		–		–		6	–	5	–	0
Holy Cross		–		–		6	–	5	–	0
Tulane		–		–		6	–	5	–	0
UNLV		–		–		6	–	6	–	0
South Carolina		–		–		6	–	6	–	0
Temple		–		–		5	–	5	–	0
Boston College		–		–		5	–	6	–	0
East Carolina		–		–		5	–	6	–	0
Northeast Louisiana		–		–		5	–	6	–	0
Louisville		–		–		5	–	6	–	0
Notre Dame		–		–		5	–	6	–	0
Rutgers		–		–		5	–	6	–	0
William & Mary		–		–		5	–	6	–	0
Syracuse		–		–		4	–	6	–	1
Richmond		–		–		4	–	7	–	0
Army		–		–		3	–	7	–	1
North Texas State		–		–		2	–	9	–	0
Georgia Tech		–		–		1	–	10	–	0
Memphis State		–		–		1	–	10	–	0
Rankings from AP Poll

1982 NCAA Division I-A independents football records
	Conf.					Overall
Team	W		L		T	W		L		T
No. 1 Penn State		–		–		11	–	1	–	0
No. 10 Pittsburgh		–		–		9	–	3	–	0
No. 13 Florida State		–		–		9	–	3	–	0
No. 19 West Virginia		–		–		9	–	3	–	0
Boston College		–		–		8	–	3	–	1
Southwestern Louisiana		–		–		7	–	3	–	1
East Carolina		–		–		7	–	4	–	0
Miami (FL)		–		–		7	–	4	–	0
Southern Miss		–		–		7	–	4	–	0
Virginia Tech		–		–		7	–	4	–	0
Notre Dame		–		–		6	–	4	–	1
Cincinnati		–		–		6	–	5	–	0
Georgia Tech		–		–		6	–	5	–	0
Navy		–		–		6	–	5	–	0
Louisville		–		–		5	–	6	–	0
Rutgers		–		–		5	–	6	–	0
Army		–		–		4	–	7	–	0
South Carolina		–		–		4	–	7	–	0
Temple		–		–		4	–	7	–	0
Tulane		–		–		4	–	7	–	0
Syracuse		–		–		2	–	9	–	0
Memphis State		–		–		1	–	10	–	0
Rankings from AP Poll

1983 NCAA Division I-A independents football records
	Conf.					Overall
Team	W		L		T	W		L		T
No. 1 Miami (FL)		–		–		11	–	1	–	0
Virginia Tech		–		–		9	–	2	–	0
No. 19 Boston College		–		–		9	–	3	–	0
No. 16 West Virginia		–		–		9	–	3	–	0
No. 20 East Carolina		–		–		8	–	3	–	0
No. 18 Pittsburgh		–		–		8	–	3	–	1
Florida State		–		–		8	–	4	–	0
Penn State		–		–		8	–	4	–	1
Southern Miss		–		–		7	–	4	–	0
Memphis State		–		–		6	–	4	–	1
Notre Dame		–		–		7	–	5	–	0
Syracuse		–		–		6	–	5	–	0
South Carolina		–		–		5	–	6	–	0
Cincinnati			–			4	–	6	–	1
Southwestern Louisiana		–		–		4	–	6	–	0
Temple		–		–		4	–	7	–	0
Tulane		–		–		4	–	7	–	0
Louisville		–		–		3	–	8	–	0
Navy		–		–		3	–	8	–	0
Rutgers		–		–		3	–	8	–	0
Army		–		–		2	–	9	–	0
Rankings from AP Poll

1984 NCAA Division I-A independents football records
	Conf.					Overall
Team	W		L		T	W		L		T
No. 5 Boston College		–		–		10	–	2	–	0
No. 11 South Carolina		–		–		10	–	2	–	0
Army		–		–		8	–	3	–	1
Rutgers		–		–		7	–	3	–	0
No. 17 Florida State		–		–		7	–	3	–	2
Virginia Tech		–		–		8	–	4	–	0
West Virginia		–		–		8	–	4	–	0
No. 18 Miami (FL)		–		–		8	–	5	–	0
Notre Dame		–		–		7	–	5	–	0
Temple		–		–		6	–	5	–	0
Southwestern Louisiana		–		–		6	–	5	–	0
Penn State		–		–		6	–	5	–	0
Syracuse		–		–		6	–	5	–	0
Memphis State		–		–		5	–	5	–	1
Navy		–		–		4	–	6	–	1
Southern Miss		–		–		4	–	7	–	0
Pittsburgh		–		–		3	–	7	–	1
Tulane		–		–		3	–	8	–	0
Cincinnati		–		–		2	–	9	–	0
East Carolina		–		–		2	–	9	–	0
Louisville		–		–		2	–	9	–	0
Rankings from AP Poll

1985 NCAA Division I-A independents football records
	Conf.					Overall
Team	W		L		T	W		L		T
No. 3 Penn State		–		–		11	–	1	–	0
No. 9 Miami (FL)		–		–		10	–	2	–	0
Army		–		–		9	–	3	–	0
No. 15 Florida State		–		–		9	–	3	–	0
West Virginia		–		–		7	–	3	–	1
Southern Miss		–		–		7	–	4	–	0
Syracuse		–		–		7	–	5	–	0
Virginia Tech		–		–		6	–	5	–	0
Pittsburgh		–		–		5	–	5	–	1
Cincinnati		–		–		5	–	6	–	0
Notre Dame		–		–		5	–	6	–	0
South Carolina		–		–		5	–	6	–	0
Southwestern Louisiana		–		–		4	–	7	–	0
Navy		–		–		4	–	7	–	0
Temple		–		–		4	–	7	–	0
Boston College		–		–		4	–	8	–	0
Memphis State		–		–		2	–	7	–	2
Rutgers		–		–		2	–	8	–	1
East Carolina		–		–		2	–	9	–	0
Louisville		–		–		2	–	9	–	0
Tulane		–		–		1	–	10	–	0
Rankings from AP Poll

1986 NCAA Division I-A independents football records
	Conf.					Overall
Team	W		L		T	W		L		T
No. 1 Penn State		–		–		12	–	0	–	0
No. 2 Miami (FL)		–		–		11	–	1	–	0
No. 20 Virginia Tech		–		–		9	–	2	–	1
No. 19 Boston College		–		–		9	–	3	–	0
Tulsa		–		–		7	–	4	–	0
Florida State		–		–		7	–	4	–	1
Army		–		–		6	–	5	–	0
Southwestern Louisiana		–		–		6	–	5	–	0
Southern Miss		–		–		6	–	5	–	0
Temple		–		–		6	–	5	–	0
Pittsburgh		–		–		5	–	5	–	1
Rutgers		–		–		5	–	5	–	1
Cincinnati		–		–		5	–	6	–	0
Notre Dame		–		–		5	–	6	–	0
Syracuse		–		–		5	–	6	–	0
South Carolina		–		–		3	–	6	–	2
Tulane		–		–		4	–	7	–	0
West Virginia		–		–		4	–	7	–	0
Louisville		–		–		3	–	8	–	0
Navy		–		–		3	–	8	–	0
Wichita State		–		–		3	–	8	–	0
East Carolina		–		–		2	–	9	–	0
Northern Illinois		–		–		2	–	9	–	0
Memphis State		–		–		1	–	10	–	0
Rankings from AP Poll

1987 NCAA Division I-A independents football records
	Conf.					Overall
Team	W		L		T	W		L		T
No. 1 Miami (FL)		–		–		12	–	0	–	0
No. 4 Syracuse		–		–		11	–	0	–	1
No. 2 Florida State		–		–		11	–	1	–	0
No. 15 South Carolina		–		–		8	–	4	–	0
Pittsburgh		–		–		8	–	4	–	0
Penn State		–		–		8	–	4	–	0
No. 17 Notre Dame		–		–		8	–	4	–	0
Southern Miss		–		–		6	–	5	–	0
Rutgers		–		–		6	–	5	–	0
Southwestern Louisiana		–		–		6	–	5	–	0
Memphis State		–		–		5	–	5	–	1
Northern Illinois		–		–		5	–	5	–	1
West Virginia		–		–		6	–	6	–	0
Tulane		–		–		6	–	6	–	0
Army		–		–		5	–	6	–	0
Boston College		–		–		5	–	6	–	0
East Carolina		–		–		5	–	6	–	0
Akron		–		–		4	–	7	–	0
Cincinnati		–		–		4	–	7	–	0
Louisville		–		–		3	–	7	–	1
Temple		–		–		3	–	8	–	0
Tulsa		–		–		3	–	8	–	0
Virginia Tech		–		–		2	–	9	–	0
Navy		–		–		2	–	9	–	0
Rankings from AP Poll

1988 NCAA Division I-A independents football records
	Conf.					Overall
Team	W		L		T	W		L		T
No. 1 Notre Dame		–		–		12	–	0	–	0
No. 2 Miami (FL)		–		–		11	–	1	–	0
No. 3 Florida State		–		–		11	–	1	–	0
No. 5 West Virginia		–		–		11	–	1	–	0
Southern Miss		–		–		10	–	2	–	0
No. 13 Syracuse		–		–		10	–	2	–	0
Army		–		–		9	–	3	–	0
Louisville		–		–		8	–	3	–	0
South Carolina		–		–		8	–	4	–	0
Northern Illinois		–		–		7	–	4	–	0
Pittsburgh		–		–		6	–	5	–	0
Memphis State		–		–		6	–	5	–	0
Southwestern Louisiana		–		–		6	–	5	–	0
Rutgers		–		–		5	–	6	–	0
Akron		–		–		5	–	6	–	0
Penn State		–		–		5	–	6	–	0
Tulane		–		–		5	–	6	–	0
Temple		–		–		4	–	7	–	0
Tulsa		–		–		4	–	7	–	0
Boston College		–		–		3	–	8	–	0
Cincinnati		–		–		3	–	8	–	0
East Carolina		–		–		3	–	8	–	0
Navy		–		–		3	–	8	–	0
Virginia Tech		–		–		3	–	8	–	0
Rankings from AP Poll

1989 NCAA Division I-A independents football records
	Conf.			Overall
Team	W	L	T	W		L		T
No. 1 Miami (FL)		–		11	–	1	–	0
No. 2 Notre Dame		–		12	–	1	–	0
No. 3 Florida State		–		10	–	2	–	0
Northern Illinois		–		9	–	2	–	0
No. 15 Penn State		–		8	–	3	–	1
No. 17 Pittsburgh		–		8	–	3	–	1
No. 21 West Virginia		–		8	–	3	–	1
Syracuse		–		8	–	4	–	0
Southwestern Louisiana		–		7	–	4	–	0
Akron		–		6	–	4	–	1
South Carolina		–		6	–	4	–	1
Virginia Tech		–		6	–	4	–	1
Louisiana Tech		–		5	–	4	–	1
Army		–		6	–	5	–	0
Louisville		–		6	–	5	–	0
East Carolina		–		5	–	5	–	1
Tulsa		–		6	–	6	–	0
Southern Miss		–		5	–	6	–	0
Tulane		–		4	–	8	–	0
Navy		–		3	–	8	–	0
Rutgers		–		2	–	7	–	2
Boston College		–		2	–	9	–	0
Memphis State		–		2	–	9	–	0
Cincinnati		–		1	–	9	–	1
Temple		–		1	–	10	–	0
Rankings from AP Poll

1990 NCAA Division I-A independents football records
	Conf.			Overall
Team	W	L	T	W		L		T
No. 14 Louisville		–		10	–	1	–	1
No. 3 Miami (FL)		–		10	–	2	–	0
No. 4 Florida State		–		10	–	2	–	0
No. 6 Notre Dame		–		9	–	3	–	0
No. 11 Penn State		–		9	–	3	–	0
Louisiana Tech		–		8	–	3	–	1
Southern Miss		–		8	–	4	–	0
Temple		–		7	–	4	–	0
Syracuse		–		7	–	4	–	2
Army		–		6	–	5	–	0
Northern Illinois		–		6	–	5	–	0
South Carolina		–		6	–	5	–	0
Virginia Tech		–		6	–	5	–	0
East Carolina		–		5	–	6	–	0
Southwestern Louisiana		–		5	–	6	–	0
Navy		–		5	–	6	–	0
Memphis State		–		4	–	6	–	1
Boston College		–		4	–	7	–	0
Tulane		–		4	–	7	–	0
West Virginia		–		4	–	7	–	0
Akron		–		3	–	7	–	1
Pittsburgh		–		3	–	7	–	1
Rutgers		–		3	–	8	–	0
Tulsa		–		3	–	8	–	0
Cincinnati		–		1	–	10	–	0
Rankings from AP Poll

1991 NCAA Division I-A independents football records
	Conf.			Overall
Team	W	L	T	W		L		T
No. 9 East Carolina		–		11	–	1	–	0
No. 4 Florida State		–		11	–	2	–	0
No. 3 Penn State		–		11	–	2	–	0
No. 21 Tulsa		–		10	–	2	–	0
Louisiana Tech		–		8	–	1	–	2
No. 13 Notre Dame		–		10	–	3	–	0
Akron		–		5	–	6	–	0
Memphis State		–		5	–	6	–	0
Army		–		4	–	7	–	0
Cincinnati		–		4	–	7	–	0
Southern Miss		–		4	–	7	–	0
South Carolina		–		3	–	6	–	2
Southwestern Louisiana		–		2	–	8	–	1
Louisville		–		2	–	9	–	0
Northern Illinois		–		2	–	9	–	0
Tulane		–		1	–	10	–	0
Navy		–		1	–	10	–	0
Rankings from AP Poll

1992 NCAA Division I-A independents football records
	Conf.			Overall
Team	W	L	T	W		L		T
No. 4 Notre Dame		–		10	–	1	–	1
Southern Miss		–		7	–	4	–	0
Penn State		–		7	–	5	–	0
Memphis State		–		6	–	5	–	0
Army		–		5	–	6	–	0
East Carolina		–		5	–	6	–	0
Louisiana Tech		–		5	–	6	–	0
Louisville		–		5	–	6	–	0
Northern Illinois		–		5	–	6	–	0
Tulsa		–		4	–	7	–	0
Cincinnati		–		3	–	8	–	0
Arkansas State		–		2	–	9	–	0
Southwestern Louisiana		–		2	–	9	–	0
Tulane		–		2	–	9	–	0
Navy		–		1	–	10	–	0
Rankings from AP Poll

1993 NCAA Division I-A independents football records
	Conf.			Overall
Team	W	L	T	W		L		T
No. 2 Notre Dame		–		11	–	1	–	0
No. 24 Louisville		–		9	–	3	–	0
Cincinnati		–		8	–	3	–	0
Army		–		6	–	5	–	0
Memphis State		–		6	–	5	–	0
Tulsa		–		4	–	6	–	1
Navy		–		4	–	7	–	0
Tulane		–		3	–	9	–	0
Southern Miss		–		2	–	8	–	1
East Carolina		–		2	–	9	–	0
Rankings from AP Poll

1994 NCAA Division I-A independents football records
	Conf.			Overall
Team	W	L	T	W		L		T
East Carolina		–		7	–	5	–	0
Louisville		–		6	–	5	–	0
Memphis		–		6	–	5	–	0
Southern Miss		–		6	–	5	–	0
Notre Dame		–		6	–	5	–	1
Army		–		4	–	7	–	0
Northeast Louisiana		–		3	–	8	–	0
Navy		–		3	–	8	–	0
Tulsa		–		3	–	8	–	0
Cincinnati		–		2	–	8	–	1
Tulane		–		1	–	10	–	0
Rankings from AP Poll

1995 NCAA Division I-A independents football records
	Conf.			Overall
Team	W	L	T	W		L		T
No. 11 Notre Dame		–		9	–	3	–	0
East Carolina		–		9	–	3	–	0
Louisville		–		7	–	4	–	0
Cincinnati		–		6	–	5	–	0
Southern Miss		–		6	–	5	–	0
Army		–		5	–	5	–	1
Navy		–		5	–	6	–	0
Tulsa		–		4	–	7	–	0
Memphis		–		3	–	8	–	0
Northeast Louisiana		–		2	–	9	–	0
North Texas		–		2	–	9	–	0
Tulane		–		2	–	9	–	0
Rankings from AP Poll

1996 NCAA Division I-A independents football records
	Conf.			Overall
Team	W		L	W		L
No. 25 Army		–		10	–	2
Navy		–		9	–	3
No. 19 Notre Dame		–		8	–	3
East Carolina		–		8	–	3
Louisiana Tech		–		6	–	5
UAB		–		5	–	6
UCF		–		5	–	6
Southwestern Louisiana		–		5	–	6
Northeast Louisiana		–		5	–	6
Arkansas State		–		4	–	7
Northern Illinois		–		1	–	10
Rankings from AP Poll

1997 NCAA Division I-A independents football records
	Conf.			Overall
Team	W		L	W		L
Louisiana Tech		–		9	–	2
Navy		–		7	–	4
Notre Dame		–		7	–	6
UAB		–		5	–	6
UCF		–		5	–	6
Northeast Louisiana		–		5	–	7
Army		–		4	–	7
Arkansas State		–		2	–	9
Southwestern Louisiana		–		1	–	10
Rankings from AP Poll

1998 NCAA Division I-A independents football records
	Conf.			Overall
Team	W		L	W		L
UCF		–		9	–	2
No. 22 Notre Dame		–		9	–	3
Louisiana Tech		–		6	–	6
Northeast Louisiana		–		5	–	6
UAB		–		4	–	7
Arkansas State		–		4	–	8
Navy		–		3	–	8
Southwestern Louisiana		–		2	–	9
Rankings from AP Poll

1999 NCAA Division I-A independents football records
	Conf.			Overall
Team	W		L	W		L
Louisiana Tech		–		8	–	3
Louisiana–Monroe		–		5	–	6
Notre Dame		–		5	–	7
Navy		–		5	–	7
UCF		–		4	–	7
Middle Tennessee		–		3	–	8
Louisiana–Lafayette		–		2	–	9
Rankings from AP Poll

2000 NCAA Division I-A independents football records
	Conf.			Overall
Team	W		L	W		L
No. 15 Notre Dame %		–		9	–	3
UCF		–		7	–	4
Middle Tennessee		–		6	–	5
Connecticut		–		3	–	8
Louisiana Tech		–		3	–	9
Louisiana–Lafayette		–		1	–	10
Louisiana–Monroe		–		1	–	10
Navy		–		1	–	10
% – BCS at-large representative; Rankings from AP Poll

2001 NCAA Division I-A independents football records
	Conf.			Overall
Team	W		L	W		L
South Florida		–		8	–	3
Troy State		–		7	–	4
UCF		–		6	–	5
Notre Dame		–		5	–	6
Utah State		–		4	–	7
Connecticut		–		2	–	9
Navy		–		0	–	10
Rankings from AP Poll

2002 NCAA Division I-A independents football records
	Conf.			Overall
Team	W		L	W		L
South Florida		–		9	–	2
No. 17 Notre Dame		–		10	–	3
Connecticut		–		6	–	6
Utah State		–		4	–	7
Troy State		–		4	–	8
Navy		–		2	–	10
Rankings from AP Poll

2003 NCAA Division I-A independents football records
	Conf.			Overall
Team	W		L	W		L
Connecticut		–		9	–	3
Navy		–		8	–	5
Troy State		–		6	–	6
Notre Dame		–		5	–	7
Rankings from AP Poll

2004 NCAA Division I-A independents football records
	Conf.			Overall
Team	W		L	W		L
No. 24 Navy		–		10	–	2
Notre Dame		–		6	–	6
Florida A&M		–		3	–	8
Rankings from AP Poll

2005 NCAA Division I-A independents football records
	Conf.			Overall
Team	W		L	W		L
No. 9 Notre Dame %		–		9	–	3
Navy		–		8	–	4
Army		–		4	–	7
Temple		–		0	–	11
% – BCS at-large representative; Rankings from AP Poll

=== NCAA Division I FBS ===
2006 NCAA Division I FBS independents football records
	Conf.			Overall
Team	W		L	W		L
No. 17 Notre Dame %		–		10	–	3
Navy		–		9	–	4
Army		–		3	–	9
Temple		–		1	–	11
% – BCS at-large representative; Rankings from AP Poll

2007 NCAA Division I FBS independents football records
	Conf.			Overall
Team	W		L	W		L
Navy		–		8	–	5
Army		–		3	–	9
Notre Dame		–		3	–	9
Rankings from AP Poll

2008 NCAA Division I FBS independents football records
	Conf.			Overall
Team	W		L	W		L
Navy		–		8	–	5
Notre Dame		–		7	–	6
Army		–		3	–	9
WKU		–		2	–	10
Rankings from AP Poll

2009 NCAA Division I FBS independents football records
	Conf.			Overall
Team	W		L	W		L
Navy		–		10	–	4
Notre Dame		–		6	–	6
Army		–		5	–	7
Rankings from AP Poll

2010 NCAA Division I FBS independents football records
	Conf.			Overall
Team	W		L	W		L
Navy		–		9	–	4
Notre Dame		–		8	–	5
Army		–		7	–	6
Rankings from AP Poll

2011 NCAA Division I FBS independents football records
	Conf.			Overall
Team	W		L	W		L
BYU		–		10	–	3
Notre Dame		–		8	–	5
Navy		–		5	–	7
Army		–		3	–	9
Rankings from AP Poll

2012 NCAA Division I FBS independents football records
	Conf.			Overall
Team	W		L	W		L
BYU		–		8	–	5
Navy		–		8	–	5
Army		–		2	–	10
No. 4 Notre Dame %		–		0*	–	0
% – BCS at-large representative; *All wins and national championship appearance for Notre Dame (12–1) in the 2012 season were vacated; Rankings from AP Poll

2013 NCAA Division I FBS independents football records
	Conf.			Overall
Team	W		L	W		L
No. 20 Notre Dame*		–		9	–	4
Navy		–		9	–	4
BYU		–		8	–	5
Army		–		3	–	9
New Mexico State		–		2	–	10
Idaho		–		1	–	11
*All wins for Notre Dame (9–4) in the 2013 season were later vacated; Rankings from AP Poll

2014 NCAA Division I FBS independents football records
	Conf.			Overall
Team	W		L	W		L
BYU		–		8	–	5
Notre Dame		–		8	–	5
Navy		–		8	–	5
Army		–		4	–	8
Rankings from AP Poll

2015 NCAA Division I FBS independents football records
	Conf.			Overall
Team	W		L	W		L
No. 11 Notre Dame		–		10	–	3
BYU		–		9	–	4
Army		–		2	–	10
Rankings from AP Poll

2016 NCAA Division I FBS independents football records
	Conf.			Overall
Team	W		L	W		L
BYU		–		9	–	4
Army		–		8	–	5
Notre Dame		–		4	–	8
UMass		–		2	–	10
Rankings from AP Poll

2017 NCAA Division I FBS independents football records
	Conf.			Overall
Team	W		L	W		L
Army		–		10	–	3
No. 11 Notre Dame		–		10	–	3
UMass		–		4	–	8
BYU		–		4	–	9
Rankings from AP Poll

2018 NCAA Division I FBS independents football records
	Conf.			Overall
Team	W		L	W		L
No. 5 Notre Dame ^		–		12	–	1
No. 19 Army		–		11	–	2
BYU		–		7	–	6
Liberty		–		6	–	6
UMass		–		4	–	8
New Mexico State		–		3	–	9
^ – College Football Playoff participant; Rankings from AP Poll

2019 NCAA Division I FBS independents football records
	Conf.			Overall
Team	W		L	W		L
No. 12 Notre Dame		–		11	–	2
Liberty		–		8	–	5
BYU		–		7	–	6
Army		–		5	–	8
New Mexico State		–		2	–	10
UMass		–		1	–	11
Rankings from AP Poll

2020 NCAA Division I FBS independents football records
	Conf.			Overall
Team	W		L	W		L
No. 11 BYU		–		11	–	1
No. 17 Liberty		–		10	–	1
Army		–		9	–	3
New Mexico State		–		1	–	1
UMass		–		0	–	4
Note: Due to COVID-19, UConn canceled the 2020 football season; New Mexico State was the only FBS school to play a spring schedule.; Rankings from AP Poll.

2021 NCAA Division I FBS independents football records
	Conf.			Overall
Team	W		L	W		L
No. 8 Notre Dame		–		11	–	2
No. 19 BYU		–		10	–	3
Army		–		9	–	4
Liberty		–		8	–	5
New Mexico State		–		2	–	10
UMass		–		1	–	11
UConn		–		1	–	11
Rankings from AP Poll

2022 NCAA Division I FBS independents football records
	Conf.			Overall
Team	W		L	W		L
No. 18 Notre Dame		–		9	–	4
Liberty		–		8	–	5
BYU		–		8	–	5
New Mexico State		–		7	–	6
Army		–		6	–	6
UConn		–		6	–	7
UMass		–		1	–	11
Rankings from AP Poll

2023 NCAA Division I FBS independents football records
	Conf.			Overall
Team	W		L	W		L
No. 14 Notre Dame		–		10	–	3
Army		–		6	–	6
UConn		–		3	–	9
UMass		–		3	–	9
Rankings from AP Poll

2024 NCAA Division I FBS independents football records
	Conf.			Overall
Team	W		L	W		L
No. 2 Notre Dame ^		–		14	–	2
UConn		–		9	–	4
UMass		–		2	–	10
^ – College Football Playoff participant; Rankings from AP Poll

2025 NCAA Division I FBS independents football records
	Conf.			Overall
Team	W		L	W		L
No. 10 Notre Dame		–		10	–	2
UConn		–		9	–	4
Rankings from AP Poll
