= Doliński =

Doliński (feminine: Dolińska; plural: Dolińscy) is a Polish surname. It may refer to:

- Dariusz Doliński (born 1959), Polish psychologist
- Joel Dolinski (born 1975), American football coach
- Katarzyna Dolińska (born 1986), American model
- Leszek Doliński (born 1956), Polish basketball player
- Marianna Dolińska (1891–1928), Polish murderer

== See also ==
- Dolinsky (disambiguation)
