= 1995 Cincinnati Bearcats football team =

American college football season

1995 Cincinnati Bearcats football
- Conference: Independent
- Record: 6–5
- Head coach: Rick Minter (2nd season)
- Offensive coordinator: Greg Seamon (1st season)
- Offensive scheme: Pro-style
- Defensive coordinator: Tim Rose (1st season)
- Base defense: 4–3
- Home stadium: Nippert Stadium

1995 NCAA Division I-A independents football records
	Conf.			Overall
Team	W	L	T	W		L		T
No. 11 Notre Dame		–		9	–	3	–	0
East Carolina		–		9	–	3	–	0
Louisville		–		7	–	4	–	0
Cincinnati		–		6	–	5	–	0
Southern Miss		–		6	–	5	–	0
Army		–		5	–	5	–	1
Navy		–		5	–	6	–	0
Tulsa		–		4	–	7	–	0
Memphis		–		3	–	8	–	0
Northeast Louisiana		–		2	–	9	–	0
North Texas		–		2	–	9	–	0
Tulane		–		2	–	9	–	0
Rankings from AP Poll

The 1995 Cincinnati Bearcats football team represented the University of Cincinnati during the 1995 NCAA Division I-A football season. The Bearcats, led by second-year head coach Rick Minter, participated as independents and played their home games at Nippert Stadium.

== Schedule ==
Date	Opponent	Site	Result	Attendance	Source
September 2	at Kansas	Memorial Stadium; Lawrence, KS	L 18–23	26,500	
September 9	No. 21 Kansas State	Nippert Stadium; Cincinnati, OH	L 21–23	16,887	
September 16	at Virginia Tech	Lane Stadium; Blacksburg, VA	W 16–0	36,328	
September 23	at Miami (OH)	Yager Stadium; Oxford, OH (Victory Bell)	L 16–23		
September 30	Toledo	Nippert Stadium; Cincinnati, OH	L 31–45		
October 7	East Carolina	Nippert Stadium; Cincinnati, OH	W 13–10	14,126	
October 14	Southern Miss	Nippert Stadium; Cincinnati, OH	W 16–13	18,522	
October 21	Memphis	Nippert Stadium; Cincinnati, OH (rivalry)	W 28–3	20,499	
October 28	at Northern Illinois	Huskie Stadium; DeKalb, IL	W 55–19	12,366	
November 11	at Kentucky	Commonwealth Stadium; Lexington, KY	L 14–33	25,231	
November 18	at Tulsa	Skelly Field; Tulsa, OK	W 24–5	19,312	
Rankings from AP Poll released prior to the game

== Roster ==
1995 Cincinnati Bearcats football team roster
Players
Coaches
Offense

Pos.	#	Name	Class
OT	78	Pierre Brilliant	So
G	61	Joel Dolinski	So
OT	67	Jason Fabini	So
QB	4	Chad Plummer	Fr
WR	18	Anthony Ladd	Jr
WR	2	Robert Tate	Jr

Defense

Pos.	#	Name	Class
DT	95	Derrick Ransom	So
OLB	3	Brad Jackson	Jr
FS	9	Chris Hewitt	Jr
SS	7	Sam Garnes	Jr
CB	21	Artrell Hawkins	So

Special teams

Pos.	#	Name	Class

Head coach

- Rick Minter

Coordinators/assistant coaches

Legend

- (C) Team captain
- (S) Suspended
- (I) Ineligible
- Injured
- Redshirt
