= Dolinsky =

Dolinsky (masculine), Dolinská (Czech and Slovak feminine), Dolinskaya (Belarusian and Russian feminine), or Dolinskoye (neuter) may refer to:

== People ==
- Ján Valašťan Dolinský (1892–1965), Slovak author
- John Dolinsky (born 1954), German-American soccer player
- Meyer Dolinsky (1923–1984), a.k.a. Mike Dolinsky, American writer, actor, and stunt coordinator
- Milan Dolinský (born 1935), Slovak footballer

== Places ==
- Dolinsky District, a district of Sakhalin Oblast, Russia
  - Dolinsky Urban Okrug, the municipal formation which it is incorporated as
- Dolinsky (inhabited locality) (Dolinskaya, Dolinskoye), name of several rural localities in Russia
- Dolynske (disambiguation) (Dolinskoye), a few populated settlements in Ukraine

== See also ==
- Doliński, a surname
