= 1995 Mississippi State Bulldogs football team =

American college football season

1995 Mississippi State Bulldogs football
- Conference: Southeastern Conference
- Western Division
- Record: 3–8 (1–7 SEC)
- Head coach: Jackie Sherrill (5th season)
- Offensive coordinator: Bruce Arians (3rd season)
- Defensive coordinator: Bill Clay (5th season)
- Home stadium: Scott Field

1995 Southeastern Conference football standings
	Conf.					Overall
Team	W		L		T	W		L		T
Eastern Division
No. 2 Florida x$	8	–	0	–	0	12	–	1	–	0
No. 3 Tennessee	7	–	1	–	0	11	–	1	–	0
Georgia	3	–	5	–	0	6	–	6	–	0
South Carolina	2	–	5	–	1	4	–	6	–	1
Kentucky	2	–	6	–	0	4	–	7	–	0
Vanderbilt	1	–	7	–	0	2	–	9	–	0
Western Division
Arkansas x	6	–	2	–	0	8	–	5	–	0
No. 21 Alabama	5	–	3	–	0	8	–	3	–	0
No. 22 Auburn	5	–	3	–	0	8	–	4	–	0
LSU	4	–	3	–	1	7	–	4	–	1
Ole Miss	3	–	5	–	0	6	–	5	–	0
Mississippi State	1	–	7	–	0	3	–	8	–	0
Championship: Florida 34, Arkansas 3
$ – Conference champion; x – Division champion/co-champions; Rankings from AP Poll

The 1995 Mississippi State Bulldogs football team represented Mississippi State University as a member of the Western Division of the Southern Conference (SEC) during the 1995 NCAA Division I-A football season. Led by fifth-year head coach Jackie Sherrill, the Bulldogs compiled an overall record of 3–8 with a mark of 1–7 in conference play, placing last out six teams in the SEC's Western Division. Mississippi State played home games at Scott Field in Starkville, Mississippi.

== Schedule ==
Date	Time	Opponent	Site	TV	Result	Attendance	Source
September 2	6:00 p.m.	Memphis*	Scott Field; Starkville, MS		W 28–18	36,324	
September 9	11:30 a.m.	LSU	Scott Field; Starkville, MS (rivalry)	JPS	L 16–34	36,110	
September 16	7:00 p.m.	at Baylor*	Floyd Casey Stadium; Waco, TX		W 30–21	42,316	
September 23	2:30 p.m.	at No. 15 Tennessee	Neyland Stadium; Knoxville, TN	ABC	L 14–52	95,232	
September 30	6:00 p.m.	Northeast Louisiana*	Scott Field; Starkville, MS		L 32–34	30,809	
October 7	1:00 p.m.	at No. 11 Auburn	Jordan-Hare Stadium; Auburn, AL		L 20–48	77,641	
October 14	6:00 p.m.	South Carolina	Scott Field; Starkville, MS	PPV	L 39–65	30,035	
October 28	1:30 p.m.	Kentucky^{†}	Scott Field; Starkville, MS		W 42–32	30,122	
November 4	11:30 a.m.	at No. 18 Arkansas	War Memorial Stadium; Fayetteville, AR	JPS	L 21–26	52,787	
November 11	11:30 a.m.	at No. 16 Alabama	Bryant–Denny Stadium; Tuscaloosa, AL (rivalry)	JPS	L 9–14	70,123	
November 30	1:30 p.m.	Ole Miss	Scott Field; Starkville, MS (Egg Bowl)		L 10–13	38,107	
*Non-conference game; ^{†}Homecoming; Rankings from AP Poll released prior to the game; All times are in Central time
