= Dolynske =

Dolynske is a Ukrainian place name which can refer to the following villages:

- Dolynske, Reni Raion
- Dolynske, Zaporizhia Raion
- Dolynske, Melitopol Raion, formerly the German colony of Johannesruh

== See also ==
- Dolinsky (disambiguation)
