= 1995 East Carolina Pirates football team =

American college football season

1995 East Carolina Pirates football

Liberty Bowl champion

Liberty Bowl, W 19–13 vs. Stanford
- Conference: Independent

Ranking
- Coaches: No. 23
- Record: 9–3
- Head coach: Steve Logan (4th season)
- Offensive coordinator: Todd Berry (4th season)
- Offensive scheme: Pro-style
- Defensive coordinator: Paul Jette (2nd season)
- Base defense: 4–3
- Home stadium: Ficklen Memorial Stadium

1995 NCAA Division I-A independents football records
	Conf.			Overall
Team	W	L	T	W		L		T
No. 11 Notre Dame		–		9	–	3	–	0
East Carolina		–		9	–	3	–	0
Louisville		–		7	–	4	–	0
Cincinnati		–		6	–	5	–	0
Southern Miss		–		6	–	5	–	0
Army		–		5	–	5	–	1
Navy		–		5	–	6	–	0
Tulsa		–		4	–	7	–	0
Memphis		–		3	–	8	–	0
Northeast Louisiana		–		2	–	9	–	0
North Texas		–		2	–	9	–	0
Tulane		–		2	–	9	–	0
Rankings from AP Poll

The 1995 East Carolina Pirates football team was an American football team that represented East Carolina University as an independent during the 1995 NCAA Division I-A football season. In their fourth season under head coach Steve Logan, the team compiled a 9–3 record and won the 1995 Liberty Bowl. The Pirates offense scored 274 points while the defense allowed 226 points.

== Schedule ==
Date	Time	Opponent	Site	TV	Result	Attendance	Source
September 2	7:00 pm	at No. 8 Tennessee	Neyland Stadium; Knoxville, TN	PPV	L 7–27	95,416	
September 9	12:00 pm	at No. 22 Syracuse	Carrier Dome; Syracuse, NY	WNCT	W 27–24	39,547	
September 16	2:00 pm	Central Michigan	Dowdy–Ficklen Stadium; Greenville, NC		W 30–17	33,021	
September 23	2:00 pm	at Illinois	Memorial Stadium; Champaign, IL		L 0–7	60,545	
September 30	12:00 pm	West Virginia	Dowdy–Ficklen Stadium; Greenville, NC	WNCT	W 23–20	34,108	
October 7	7:00 pm	at Cincinnati	Nippert Stadium; Cincinnati, OH		L 10–13	14,126	
October 21	2:00 pm	Temple^{†}	Dowdy–Ficklen Stadium; Greenville, NC		W 32–22	31,225	
October 28	6:00 pm	at Southern Miss	M. M. Roberts Stadium; Hattiesburg, MS	WNCT	W 36–34	21,293	
November 4	1:30 pm	at Army	Michie Stadium; West Point, NY		W 31–25	31,743	
November 11	2:00 pm	Tulsa	Dowdy–Ficklen Stadium; Greenville, NC		W 28–7	26,410	
November 18	12:00 pm	Memphis	Dowdy–Ficklen Stadium; Greenville, NC	SSN	W 31–17	27,125	
December 31	12:00 pm	vs. Stanford	Liberty Bowl Memorial Stadium; Memphis, TN (Liberty Bowl)	ESPN	W 19–13	47,398	
^{†}Homecoming; Rankings from AP Poll released prior to the game; All times are in Eastern time

== Game summaries ==
=== Syracuse ===
East Carolina Pirates at #22 Syracuse Orangemen

Quarter	1	2	3	4	Total
East Carolina	0	7	13	7	27
Syracuse	7	14	3	0	24

at Carrier Dome, Syracuse, New York

- Date: September 9, 1995
- Game time: 12:00 p.m. EST
- Game attendance: 39,547
- Box Score

Game information
First quarter
- SYR - M. Thomas 8 run (O. Mare kick)

Second quarter

- SYR - T. Jones 11 run (O. Mare kick)
- SYR - D. Maddox 8 pass from D. McNabb (O. Mare kick)
- ECU - L. Shannon 5 pass from M. Crandell (C. Holcomb kick)

Third quarter

- ECU - D. Batson 30 pass from M. Crandell (C. Holcomb kick)
- ECU - S. Richard 20 pass from M. Crandell (kick failed)
- SYR - O. Mare 24 FG

Fourth quarter

- ECU - J. McPhail 14 pass from M. Crandell (C. Holcomb kick)

=== Illinois ===
East Carolina Pirates at Illinois Fighting Illini

Quarter	1	2	3	4	Total
East Carolina	0	0	0	0	0
Illinois	0	7	0	0	7

at Memorial Stadium, Champaign, Illinois

- Date: September 16, 1995
- Game time: 1:00 p.m. CST
- Game attendance: 60,545
- Box Score

Game information
First quarter
- No scoring

Second quarter

- ILL - Robert Holcombe 1-yard run (B. Scheuplein kick)

Third quarter

- No scoring

Fourth quarter

- No scoring

=== West Virginia ===
West Virginia Mountaineers at East Carolina Pirates

Quarter	1	2	3	4	Total
West Virginia	3	6	8	3	20
East Carolina	14	6	0	3	23

at Dowdy-Ficklen Stadium, Greenville, North Carolina

- Date: September 30, 1995
- Game time: 12:00 p.m. EST
- Game attendance: 34,108
- Box score

Game information
First quarter
- WVU - FG Br. Baumann 33
- ECU - Shannon 67 pass from M Crandell (Holcomb kick)
- ECU - M. Crandell 10 run (Holcomb kick)

Second quarter

- ECU - Shannon 9 pass from M. Crandell (kick failed)
- WVU - Barber 2 run (two-point conversion failed)

Third quarter

- WVU - Saunders 50 pass from Boykin (two-point conversion failed)
- WVU - Safety, M. Crandell tackled in end zone

Fourth quarter

- WVU - FG Br. Baumann 31
- ECU - FG Holcomb 27

=== Temple ===
Temple Owls at East Carolina Pirates

Quarter	1	2	3	4	Total
Temple	0	0	7	15	22
East Carolina	3	10	19	0	32

at Dowdy-Ficklen Stadium, Greenville, North Carolina

- Date: October 21, 1995
- Game time: 2:00 p.m. EST
- Game attendance: 31,225
- Box score

Game information
First quarter
- ECU - FG Holcomb 28

Second quarter

- ECU - Crandell 7 run (Holcomb kick)
- ECU - FG Holcomb 29

Third quarter

- ECU - Nichols 5 pass from Crandell (two-point conversion failed)
- TEM - Johnson 11 pass from Burris (Michalski kick)
- ECU - Harley 7 run (Holcomb kick)
- ECU - Foreman 31 fumble return (Holcomb kick)

Fourth quarter

- TEM - Burris 9 run (Michalski kick)
- TEM - Kersey 23 pass from Burris (Walker reception for two-point conversion)

== Roster ==
Quarterbacks: 5 Marcus Crandell - Junior; 9 Dan Gonzalez - Sophomore; 15 Ernest Tinnen - Freshman; Running backs: 31 Eric Blanton - Senior; 40 Damon Davis - Freshman; 44 Scott Harley - Freshman; 33 Chuck Ingram - Senior; 4 Daryl Jones - Freshman; 19 Raymond Mabry - Freshman; 23 Jerris McPhail - Senior; -- Brad Salin - Freshman; Fullbacks: 25 Derrck Batson - Senior; Wide receivers: 87 Lamont Chappell - Freshman; 20 Linwood DeBrew - Sophomore; 82 Mitchell Galloway - Junior; 84 Chad Hodges - Freshman; -- Perez Mattison - Junior; 86 Travis Newkirk - Freshman; 1 Jason Nichols - Sophomore; 85 Mike Sellers - Freshman; 80 Larry Shannon - Sophomore; 26 Troy Smith - Freshman; 15 Allan Winters - Junior	Tight ends: 83 Dwight Linville - Senior; 90 Scott Richards - Junior; 88 Sean Richards - Junior; Offensive line: 77 Charles Boothe - Senior; 64 Lamont Burns - Junior; 60 Derek Cernak - Freshman; 73 Jake Gilray - Junior; 59 Jamie Gray - Junior; 50 Mpumi Masimini - Freshman; 74 Mark McCall - Junior; 67 Shane McPherson - Junior; Danny Moore - Freshman; 54 Brian Pazcuzzi - Freshman; 79 Trey Pittman - Freshman; 70 Corey Russell - Freshman; 71 Mike Sheehan - Freshman; 61 Ron Suddith - Junior; 76 Stacey Whitehead - Sophomore; 63 Kevin Wiggins - Senior; Defensive line: Alphonso Collins - Sophomore; 78 Mondell Corbett - Freshman; 95 Travis Darden - Freshman; 52 Matt Ellison - Freshman; 66 Jeff Griffin - Junior; 97 Kevin Jorgenson - Sophomore; 99 Dwayne Ledford - Freshman; 48 Tomha McMillan - Freshman; 62 Brad Royal - Freshman; 96 Walter Scott - Senior; 72 Ed Watkins - Junior; 45 Lorenzo West - Junior; 97 Terrell Williams - Junior	Linebackers: 94 Aaron Black - Senior; 44 Chris Braddy - Freshman; 53 Carlos Brown - Junior; 51 Marvin Burke - Junior; 58 Freddie Claybrooks - Freshman; 57 Roderick Coleman - Freshman; 33 B.J. Crane - Junior; 7 Morris Foreman - Senior; 98 Don Jacobs - Sophomore; 93 Brian Johnson - Freshman; 84 Jeff Kerr - Freshman; 81 Mark Libiano - Senior; 89 Kendrick Phillips - Freshman; 49 Matt Semenza - Sophomore; 32 Shep Sepaniak - Freshman; Defensive backs: 1 David Burnell - Freshman; 14 Brian Bentley - Freshman; 17 David Crumbie - Senior; 39 Jamar Epps - Freshman; 37 Forest Foster - Freshman; 43 Tim McKinnon - Sophomore; 35 Kevin Monroe - Freshman; 45 Tim Mack - Freshman; Cornerback: 13 Hank Cooper - Senior; 21 Tim Wise - Sophomore; 42 Bernard Lackey - Freshman; 3 Emmanuel McDaniel - Senior; 38 Deeone McKeithan - Freshman; 8 Kelvin Suggs - Freshman; 28 Tabari Wallace - Sophomore	Safeties: 6 E.J. Gunthrope - Junior; 22 Daren Hart - Junior; 30 Dwight Henry - Junior; 11 Tavares Taylor - Freshman; Punters: 27 Edward Crabtree - Junior; 2 Brandon Lawn - Freshman; 10 Matt Levine - Sophomore; 11 Stephen Urbaniak - Freshman; Kickers: 3 Brian Best - Freshman; 24 Chad Holcomb - Junior; Long snappers: 65 John Drake - Freshman; 55 Jason Shell - Sophomore; 47 Brian Williams - Junior

== Team players drafted into the NFL ==
Player	Position	Round	Pick	NFL club
Emmanuel McDaniel	Defensive Back	4	111	Carolina Panthers
Jerris McPhail	Running Back	5	134	Miami Dolphins
