= 1995 Notre Dame Fighting Irish football team =

American college football season

1995 Notre Dame Fighting Irish football

Orange Bowl, L 26–31 vs. Florida State
- Conference: Independent

Ranking
- Coaches: No. 13
- AP: No. 11
- Record: 9–3
- Head coach: Lou Holtz (10th season)
- Offensive coordinator: Dave Roberts (2nd season)
- Offensive scheme: Multiple I formation
- Defensive coordinator: Bob Davie (2nd season)
- Base defense: 4–3
- MVP: Derrick Mayes
- Captains: Paul Grasmanis; Derrick Mayes; Shawn Wooden; Dusty Zeigler
- Home stadium: Notre Dame Stadium

1995 NCAA Division I-A independents football records
| | Conf. | | | Overall |
| Team | W | L | T | W | | L | | T |
|---|---|---|---|---|---|---|---|---|
| No. 11 Notre Dame | | – | | 9 | – | 3 | – | 0 |
| East Carolina | | – | | 9 | – | 3 | – | 0 |
| Louisville | | – | | 7 | – | 4 | – | 0 |
| Cincinnati | | – | | 6 | – | 5 | – | 0 |
| Southern Miss | | – | | 6 | – | 5 | – | 0 |
| Army | | – | | 5 | – | 5 | – | 1 |
| Navy | | – | | 5 | – | 6 | – | 0 |
| Tulsa | | – | | 4 | – | 7 | – | 0 |
| Memphis | | – | | 3 | – | 8 | – | 0 |
| Northeast Louisiana | | – | | 2 | – | 9 | – | 0 |
| North Texas | | – | | 2 | – | 9 | – | 0 |
| Tulane | | – | | 2 | – | 9 | – | 0 |
Rankings from AP Poll

The 1995 Notre Dame Fighting Irish football team was an American football team that represented the University of Notre Dame as an independent during the 1995 NCAA Division I-A football season. In their tenth year under head coach Lou Holtz, the Irish compiled a 9–3 record, outscored opponents by a total of 366 to 216, and were ranked No. 11 in the final AP poll and No. 13 in the final UPI poll. They lost the season opener to unranked Northwestern and also lost to No. 7 Ohio State, but defeated No. 13 Texas, No. 15 Washington, and No. 5 USC. They concluded the season with a loss to No. 8 Florida State in the Orange Bowl.

No Notre Dame players received first-team honors on the 1995 All-America college football team. The team's statistical leaders included quarterback Ron Powlus (1,853 passing yards), Randy Kinder (809 rushing yards), Derrick Mayes (48 receptions for 881 yards), and Marc Edwards (72 points scored).

The team played its home games at Notre Dame Stadium in Notre Dame, Indiana.

== Schedule ==
| Date | Time | Opponent | Rank | Site | TV | Result | Attendance | Source |
|---|---|---|---|---|---|---|---|---|
| September 2 | 2:30 p.m. | Northwestern | No. 9 | Notre Dame Stadium; Notre Dame, IN (rivalry) | NBC | L 15–17 | 59,075 | |
| September 9 | 3:30 p.m. | at Purdue | No. 25 | Ross–Ade Stadium; West Lafayette, IN (rivalry) | ABC | W 35–28 | 70,569 | |
| September 16 | 2:30 p.m. | Vanderbilt | No. 24 | Notre Dame Stadium; Notre Dame, IN | NBC | W 41–0 | 59,075 | |
| September 23 | 12:30 p.m. | No. 13 Texas | No. 21 | Notre Dame Stadium; Notre Dame, IN | NBC | W 55–27 | 59,075 | |
| September 30 | 3:30 p.m. | at No. 7 Ohio State | No. 15 | Ohio Stadium; Columbus, OH | ABC | L 26–45 | 95,537 | |
| October 7 | 3:30 p.m. | at No. 15 Washington | No. 23 | Husky Stadium; Seattle, WA | ABC | W 29–21 | 74,023 | |
| October 14 | 12:00 p.m. | at Army | No. 17 | Giants Stadium; East Rutherford, NJ (rivalry) | ABC | W 28–27 | 74,218 | |
| October 21 | 2:30 p.m. | No. 5 USC | No. 17 | Notre Dame Stadium; Notre Dame, IN (rivalry) | NBC | W 38–10 | 59,075 | |
| October 28 | 2:30 p.m. | Boston College | No. 12 | Notre Dame Stadium; Notre Dame, IN (Holy War) | NBC | W 20–10 | 59,075 | |
| November 4 | 1:30 p.m. | Navy | No. 8 | Notre Dame Stadium; Notre Dame, IN (rivalry) | NBC | W 35–17 | 59,075 | |
| November 18 | 7:45 p.m. | at Air Force | No. 8 | Falcon Stadium; Colorado Springs, CO (rivalry) | ESPN | W 44–14 | 54,482 | |
| January 1, 1996 | 8:00 p.m. | vs. No. 8 Florida State | No. 6 | Miami Orange Bowl; Miami, FL (Orange Bowl, rivalry) | CBS | L 26–31 | 72,198 | |
Rankings from AP Poll released prior to the game; All times are in Eastern time

== Game summaries ==
=== Northwestern ===
Northwestern Wildcats at #9 Notre Dame Fighting Irish

| Quarter | 1 | 2 | 3 | 4 | Total |
|---|---|---|---|---|---|
| Northwestern | 7 | 3 | 7 | 0 | 17 |
| Notre Dame | 0 | 9 | 0 | 6 | 15 |

at Notre Dame Stadium, Notre Dame, Indiana

- Date: September 2, 1995
- Game time: 1:30 p.m. CST
- Game attendance: 59,075
- TV announcers (NBC): Tom Hammond, Bob Trumpy, John Dockery

Game information

First quarter

- NW - Dave Beazley 6-yard pass from Steve Schnur (Valenzisi kick)

Second quarter

- ND - Kevin Kopka 35-yard field goal
- NW - Sam Valenzisi 37-yard field goal
- ND - Robert Farmer 5-yard run (kick failed)

Third quarter

- NW - D'Wayne Bates 26-yard pass from Steve Schnur (Valenzisi kick)

Fourth quarter

- ND - Randy Kinder 2-yard run (conversion failed)

=== Purdue ===
Notre Dame Fighting Irish at Purdue Boilermakers

| Quarter | 1 | 2 | 3 | 4 | Total |
|---|---|---|---|---|---|
| Notre Dame | 0 | 14 | 14 | 7 | 35 |
| Purdue | 7 | 3 | 3 | 15 | 28 |

at Ross-Ade Stadium, West Lafayette, Indiana

- Date: September 9, 1995
- Game time: 2:30 p.m. EST
- Game attendance: 70,569
- Box Score

Game information

First quarter

- PUR - Rogers 42 yard run (Bobich kick)

Second quarter

- ND - Kinder 30 yard pass from Powlus (Kopka kick)
- ND - Mayes 12 yard pass from Powlus (Kopka kick)
- PUR - Bobich 25 yard field goal

Third quarter

- ND - Sollman 15 yard pass from Powlus (Kopka kick)
- PUR - Bobich 21 yard field goal
- ND - Mosley 51 yard pass from Powlus (Kopka kick)

Fourth quarter

- PUR - Watson 13 yard run (Bobich kick)
- PUR - D Brown 54 yard interception return (Rogers reception for two-point conversion)
- ND - Kinder 52 yard run (Kopka kick)

Top Rushers

- ND - Kinder - 14 rushes, 142 yards
- PUR - Mike Alstott - 21 rushes, 115 yards

Top Passers

- ND - Ron Powlus - 17/25, 252 yards, 4 TDs, 2 INTs
- PUR - Rick Trefzger - 15/27, 181 yards, 2 INTs

Top Receivers

- ND - Mayes - 7 receptions, 85 yards, 1 TD
- PUR - Alford- 7 receptions, 91 yards

=== Vanderbilt ===
Vanderbilt Commodores at #24 Notre Dame Fighting Irish

| Quarter | 1 | 2 | 3 | 4 | Total |
|---|---|---|---|---|---|
| Vanderbilt | 0 | 0 | 0 | 0 | 0 |
| Notre Dame | 7 | 20 | 7 | 7 | 41 |

at Notre Dame Stadium, Notre Dame, Indiana

- Date: September 16, 1995
- Game time: 1:30 p.m. CST
- Game attendance: 50,975
- TV: NBC
- Box Score

Game information
First quarter
- ND - Kinder 6 run (Kopka kick)

Second quarter

- ND - FG Kopka 38
- ND - A Denson 5 run (Kopka kick)
- ND - Edison 8 fumble return (Kopka kick)
- ND - FG Kopka 22

Third quarter

- ND - Edwards 1 run (Kopka kick)

Fourth quarter

- ND - Edwards 1 run (Kopka kick)

=== Texas ===
#13 Texas Longhorns at #21 Notre Dame Fighting Irish

| Quarter | 1 | 2 | 3 | 4 | Total |
|---|---|---|---|---|---|
| Texas | 7 | 6 | 7 | 7 | 27 |
| Notre Dame | 10 | 8 | 8 | 28 | 54 |

at Notre Dame Stadium, Notre Dame, Indiana

- Date: September 23, 1995
- Game time: 12:30 p.m. EST
- Game attendance: 59,075
- TV: NBC
- Box Score

Game information
First quarter
- ND - FG Kopka 27
- ND - Mosley 64 punt return (Kopka kick)
- TEX - Fitzgerald 1 pass from J Brown (Dawson kick)

Second quarter

- ND - Mayes 11 pass from Powlus (Kopka kick)
- TEX - Fitzgerald 15 pass from J Brown (kick failed)
- ND - 2 point defensive conversion by A Rossum

Third quarter

- TEX - S Bradley 1 pass from J Brown (Dawson kick)
- ND - Kinder 3 run (Edwards run for two-point conversion)

Fourth quarter

- ND - Edwards 3 run (Kopka kick)
- ND - Edwards 12 pass from Powlus (Kopka kick)
- TEX - Fitzgerald 19 pass from J Brown (Dawson kick)
- ND - Edwards 27 run (Kopka kick)
- ND - A Rossum 29 interception return (Kopka kick)

=== Ohio State ===
#15 Notre Dame Fighting Irish at #7 Ohio State Buckeyes

| Quarter | 1 | 2 | 3 | 4 | Total |
|---|---|---|---|---|---|
| Notre Dame | 0 | 17 | 3 | 6 | 26 |
| Ohio State | 0 | 14 | 14 | 17 | 45 |

at Ohio Stadium, Columbus, Ohio

- Date: September 30, 1995
- Game time: 3:30 p.m.
- Game weather: Clear, 80 °F (27 °C), Wind 10-15 SSE
- Game attendance: 95,537
- Referee: John Nealon
- TV announcers (ABC): Keith Jackson, Bob Griese, and Lynn Swann
- Box Score

Game information

First quarter

- No scoring

Second quarter

- ND - Kevin Kopka, 20-yard field goal
- ND - Randy Kinder 3-yard run (Kevin Kopka kick)
- OSU – Terry Glenn 10-yard pass from Bobby Hoying (Josh Jackson kick)
- ND - Randy Kinder 7-yard run (Kevin Kopka kick)
- OSU - Dimitrious Stanley 17-yard pass from Bobby Hoying (Josh Jackson kick)

Third quarter

- ND - Kevin Kopka, 22-yard field goal
- OSU – Rickey Dudley 15-yard pass from Bobby Hoying (Josh Jackson kick)
- OSU – Terry Glenn 82-yard pass from Bobby Hoying (Josh Jackson kick)

Fourth quarter

- OSU – Eddie George 5-yard run (Josh Jackson kick)
- ND - Randy Kinder 13-yard run (run failed)
- OSU - Eddie George 3-yard run (Josh Jackson kick)
- OSU - Josh Jackson 35-yard field goal

Top passers

- OSU – Bobby Hoying – 14/22, 272 yards, 4 TD
- ND - Ron Powlus - 13/26, 243 yards, 1 INT

Top rushers

- OSU – Eddie George – 32 rushes, 207 yards, 2 TD
- ND – Randy Kinder – 28 rushes, 143 yards, 3 TDs

Top receivers

- OSU – Terry Glenn – 4 receptions, 128 yards, 2 TDs
- ND - Derrick Mayes - 5 receptions, 125 yards

Top tacklers

- ND - Lyron Cobbins - 5 solo, 9 assists (14 total)
- OSU - Greg Bellisari - 4 solo, 8 assists (12 total)

Interceptions

- OSU - Shawn Springs (1)

Fumbles Recovered

- OSU - Matt Bonhaus (1)

=== Washington ===
#23 Notre Dame Fighting Irish at #15 Washington Huskies

| Quarter | 1 | 2 | 3 | 4 | Total |
|---|---|---|---|---|---|
| Notre Dame | 7 | 0 | 0 | 22 | 29 |
| Washington | 7 | 0 | 7 | 7 | 21 |

at Husky Stadium, West Lafayette, Indiana

- Date: October 7, 1995
- Game time: 3:30 p.m. EST
- Game attendance: 74,023
- Box Score

Game information
First quarter
- ND - Mayes 10 pass from Powlus (Kopka kick)
- UW - Shehee 1 run (Wales kick)

Second quarter

- No scoring

Third quarter

- UW - Desaussure 13 pass from D. Huard (Wales kick)

Fourth quarter

- ND - Mayes 30 pass from Powlus (Kopka kick)
- UW - Shehee 22 run (Wales kick)
- ND - A. Denson 7 run (Mayes reception for two-point conversion)
- ND - A. Rossum 77 interception return (Kopka kick)

=== Army ===
#17 Notre Dame Fighting Irish at Army Cadets

| Quarter | 1 | 2 | 3 | 4 | Total |
|---|---|---|---|---|---|
| Notre Dame | 14 | 7 | 7 | 0 | 28 |
| Army | 7 | 0 | 7 | 13 | 27 |

at Giants Stadium, East Rutherford, New Jersey

- Date: October 14, 1995
- Game time: 3:30 p.m. EST
- Game attendance: 74,218
- Box Score

Game information

Scoring summary
| 1 | Notre Dame | Denson 2 yard run (Kopka kick) | Notre Dame 7-0 |
| 1 | Army | Leshinski 1 yard pass from McAda (Parker kick) | Tie 7-7 |
| 1 | Notre Dame | Edwards 2 yard run (Kopka kick) | Notre Dame 14-7 |
| 2 | Notre Dame | Denson 2 yard run (Kopka kick) | Notre Dame 21-7 |
| 3 | Notre Dame | Edwards 46 yard pass from Powlus (Kopka kick) | Notre Dame 28-7 |
| 3 | Army | Conroy 5 yard run (Parker kick) | Notre Dame 28-14 |
| 4 | Army | Conroy 3 yard run (Parker kick) | Notre Dame 28-21 |
| 4 | Army | Gantt 7 yard pass from McAda (pass failed) | Notre Dame 28-27 |

=== USC ===
#5 USC Trojans at #17 Notre Dame Fighting Irish

| Quarter | 1 | 2 | 3 | 4 | Total |
|---|---|---|---|---|---|
| USC | 0 | 7 | 3 | 0 | 10 |
| Notre Dame | 6 | 15 | 0 | 17 | 38 |

at Notre Dame Stadium, Notre Dame, Indiana

- Date: October 21, 1995
- Game time: 2:30 p.m. EST
- Game attendance: 59,075
- TV: NBC
- Box Score

Game information
First quarter
- ND - M. Edwards 9-yard run (kick failed)

Second quarter

- USC - K. Johnson 17-yard pass from Wachholtz (Renden kick)
- ND - M. Edwards 2-yard run (R. Powlus reception for two-point conversion)
- ND - A. Denson 4-yard run (Kopka kick)

Third quarter

- USC - Renden 25-yard field goal

Fourth quarter

- ND - Safety, K. Minor tackled K. Wachholtz in end zone
- ND - P. Chryplewicz 2-yard pass from Powlus (Edwards run for two-point conversion)
- ND - M. Edwards 1-yard run (Kopka kick)

=== Boston College ===
Boston College Eagles at #12 Notre Dame Fighting Irish

| Quarter | 1 | 2 | 3 | 4 | Total |
|---|---|---|---|---|---|
| Boston College | 0 | 7 | 3 | 0 | 10 |
| Notre Dame | 7 | 3 | 7 | 3 | 20 |

at Notre Dame Stadium, Notre Dame, Indiana

- Date: October 28, 1995
- Game time: 2:30 p.m. EST
- Game attendance: 59,075
- TV: NBC
- Box Score

Game information
First quarter
- ND - Edwards 17 pass from Powlus (Cengia kick)

Second quarter

- BC - O. Walker 2 run (McGuire kick)
- ND - FG Cengia 22

Third quarter

- ND - Edwards 2 run (Cengia kick)
- BC - FG McGuire 41

Fourth quarter

- ND - FG Cengia 26

=== Navy ===
Navy Midshipmen at #8 Notre Dame Fighting Irish

| Quarter | 1 | 2 | 3 | 4 | Total |
|---|---|---|---|---|---|
| Navy | 7 | 10 | 0 | 0 | 17 |
| Notre Dame | 7 | 7 | 14 | 7 | 35 |

at Notre Dame Stadium, Notre Dame, Indiana

- Date: November 4, 1995
- Game time: 1:30 p.m. EST
- Game attendance: 59,075
- Box Score

Game information

Scoring summary
| 1 | Navy | Scott 15 yard run (Covarubias kick) | Navy 7-0 |
| 1 | Notre Dame | Wallace 8 yard pass from Powlus (Cengia kick) | Tied 7-7 |
| 2 | Navy | Fay 3 yard run (Covarubias kick) | Navy 14-7 |
| 2 | Notre Dame | Powlus 1 yard run (Cengia kick) | Tied 14-14 |
| 2 | Navy | Graham 216 yard field goal | Navy 17-14 |
| 3 | Notre Dame | Mayes 42 yard pass from Krug (Cengia kick) | Notre Dame 21-17 |
| 3 | Notre Dame | Mayes 3 yard pass from Krug (Cengia kick) | Notre Dame 28-17 |
| 4 | Notre Dame | Denson 24 yard run (Cengia kick) | Notre Dame 35-17 |

=== Air Force ===
#8 Notre Dame Fighting Irish at Army Cadets

| Quarter | 1 | 2 | 3 | 4 | Total |
|---|---|---|---|---|---|
| Notre Dame | 10 | 10 | 17 | 7 | 44 |
| Air Force | 0 | 0 | 7 | 7 | 14 |

at Falcon Stadium, Colorado Springs, Colorado

- Date: November 18, 1995
- Game time: 7:45 p.m. EST
- Game attendance: 54,482
- Box Score

Game information

Scoring summary
| 1 | Notre Dame | Kinder 17 yard run (Cengia kick) | Notre Dame 7-0 |
| 1 | Notre Dame | Cengia 30 yard kick | Notre Dame 10-0 |
| 2 | Notre Dame | Denson 3 yard run (Cengia kick) | Notre Dame 17-0 |
| 2 | Notre Dame | Cengia 26 yard kick | Notre Dame 20-0 |
| 3 | Notre Dame | Cengia 30 yard kick | Notre Dame 23-0 |
| 3 | Air Force | Addison 8 yard pass from Morgan (Thompson kick) | Notre Dame 23-7 |
| 3 | Notre Dame | Denson 30 yard run (Cengia kick) | Notre Dame 30-7 |
| 3 | Notre Dame | Kinder 5 yard run (Cengia kick) | Notre Dame 37-7 |
| 4 | Notre Dame | Thorne 5 yard run (Cengia kick) | Notre Dame 44-7 |
| 4 | Air Force | Brooks 11 yard pass from Morgan (Thompson kick) | Notre Dame 44-14 |

=== 1996 Orange Bowl ===
#8 Florida State Seminoles vs. #6 Notre Dame Fighting Irish

| Quarter | 1 | 2 | 3 | 4 | Total |
|---|---|---|---|---|---|
| Florida State | 7 | 7 | 0 | 17 | 31 |
| Notre Dame | 10 | 0 | 7 | 9 | 26 |

at Miami Orange Bowl, Miami, Florida

- Date: January 1, 1996
- Game time: 8:00 p.m. EST
- Game attendance: 72,198
- Referee: Jimmy Harper (SEC)
- TV announcers (CBS): Sean McDonough and Pat Haden
- Box Score

Game information

First quarter

Second quarter

Third quarter

Fourth quarter

== Roster ==
1995 Notre Dame Fighting Irish football team roster
Players
Coaches
Offense

| Pos. | # | Name | Class |
|---|---|---|---|
| WR | 82 | Bobby Brown | Fr |
| TE | 40 | Kevin Carretta | Sr |
| TE | 98 | Pete Chryplewicz | Sr |
| OT | 75 | Chris Clevenger | Jr |
| OT | 73 | Mike Doughty | Jr |
| FB | 44 | Marc Edwards | Jr |
| RB | 31 | Robert Farmer | Jr |
| QB | 7 | Jarious Jackson | Fr |
| WR | 83 | Malcolm Johnson | So |
| C | 57 | Rick Kaczenski | Jr |
| RB | 26 | Randy Kinder | Jr |
| QB | 11 | Thomas Krug | Jr |
| WR | 1 | Derrick Mayes | Sr |
| QB | 10 | Mike Perona | Jr |
| OT | 54 | Luke Petitgout | Fr |
| QB | 3 | Ron Powlus | Jr |
| G | 79 | Mike Rosenthal | Fr |
| OT | 71 | Jerry Wisne | Fr |
| C | 77 | Dusty Zeigler | Sr |

Defense

| Pos. | # | Name | Class |
|---|---|---|---|
| DL | 95 | Cory Bennent | So |
| LB | 13 | Bertrand Berry | Jr |
| LB | 58 | Mike Burgdorf | Jr |
| LB | 6 | Lyron Cobbins | Jr |
| DB | 14 | Ivory Covington | So |
| CB | 23 | Autry Denson | Fr |
| DT | 93 | Paul Grasmanis | Sr |
| LB | 27 | Bobbie Howard | Fr |
| SS | 15 | Brian Magee | Sr |
| LB | 4 | Kory Minor | Fr |
| FS | 9 | LaRon Moore | Sr |
| CB | 15 | Allen Rossum | So |
| LB | 2 | Kinnon Tatum | Jr |
| CB | 22 | Shawn Wooden | Sr |
| DE | 48 | Renaldo Wynn | Sr |

Special teams

| Pos. | # | Name | Class |
|---|---|---|---|
| K | 20 | Kevin Kopka | Fr |
| P | 8 | Hunter Smith | Fr |

Head coach

- Lou Holtz

Coordinators/assistant coaches

- Dave Roberts (OC)
- Bob Davie (DC)
- Charlie Strong (DL)

Legend

- (C) Team captain
- (S) Suspended
- (I) Ineligible
- Injured
- Redshirt

== Statistics ==
Passing

1. Ron Powlus - 124 of 217 for 1,853 yards, 12 touchdowns, 7 interceptions
2. Tom Krug - 13 of 21 for 186 yards, 2 touchdowns, 1 interception

Rushing

1. Randy Kinder - 809 yards, 5.7-yard average, 9 touchdowns
2. Marc Edwards - 717 yards, 5.1-yard average, 9 touchdowns
3. Autry Denson - 695 yards, 5.1-yard average, 8 touchdowns
4. Robert Farmer - 194 yards, 4.5-yard average, 1 touchdown

Receiving

1. Derrick Mayes - 48 receptions for 881 yards, 6 touchdowns
2. Marc Edwards - 25 receptions for 361 yards, 3 touchdowns
3. Emmett Mosley - 17 receptions for 268 yards, 1 touchdown
4. Pete Chryplewicz - 17 receptions for 204 yards, 1 touchdown

Scoring

1. Marc Edwards - 76 points, 12 touchdowns, 2 two-point conversions
2. Randy Kinder - 60 points, 10 touchdowns
3. Autry Denson - 48 points, 8 touchdowns
4. Kevin Kopka - 45 points, 27 of 28 PAT, 6 of 11 field goals
5. Derrick Mayesl - 38 points, 6 touchdowns, 1 two-point conversion
6. Scott Cengia - 27 points, 12 of 12 PAT, 5 of 5 field goals

Tackles

1. Lyron Cobbins - 105
2. Kinnon Tatum - 82
3. Bert Berry - 76
4. LaRon Moore - 70
5. Brian Magee - 69
6. Paul Grasmanis - 69
7. Shawn Wooden - 63
8. Renaldo Wynn - 57

== Awards and honors ==
Split end Derrick Mayes received second-team honors from Football News and the Newspaper Enterprise Association (NEA) on the 1995 All-America college football team. He was also a semifinalit for the Biletnikoff Award and was selected as the team's most valuable player.

Offensive guard Ryan Leahy received third-team All-America honors from the Associated Press.

The team had five captains: Paul Grasmanis, Ryan Leahy, Derrick Mayes, Shawn Wooden, and Dusty Zeigler.

Emil Sitko, who played for Notre Dame in the 1940s, was inducted into the College Football Hall of Fame
