= Randy Kinder =

American football player (born 1975)

No. 43
- Position: Running back

Personal information
- Born: April 4, 1975 (age 51); Washington, D.C., U.S.
- Listed height: 6 ft 1 in (1.85 m)
- Listed weight: 213 lb (97 kg)

Career information
- High school: East Lansing (MI)
- College: Notre Dame
- NFL draft: 1997: undrafted

Career history
- Green Bay Packers (1997); Philadelphia Eagles (1997)
- Stats at Pro Football Reference

Randolph Samuel Kinder (born April 4, 1975) is a former running back in the National Football League (NFL). He played with the Philadelphia Eagles and the Green Bay Packers 1997 NFL season. As such, he was a member of the NFC Championship team with the Packers.

He played at the collegiate level at the University of Notre Dame.
