= 1995 Memphis Tigers football team =

American college football season

1995 Memphis Tigers football
- Conference: Independent
- Record: 3–8
- Head coach: Rip Scherer (1st season)
- Offensive coordinator: Sparky Woods (1st season)
- Defensive coordinator: Jim Pletcher (1st season)
- Home stadium: Liberty Bowl Memorial Stadium

1995 NCAA Division I-A independents football records
	Conf.			Overall
Team	W	L	T	W		L		T
No. 11 Notre Dame		–		9	–	3	–	0
East Carolina		–		9	–	3	–	0
Louisville		–		7	–	4	–	0
Cincinnati		–		6	–	5	–	0
Southern Miss		–		6	–	5	–	0
Army		–		5	–	5	–	1
Navy		–		5	–	6	–	0
Tulsa		–		4	–	7	–	0
Memphis		–		3	–	8	–	0
Northeast Louisiana		–		2	–	9	–	0
North Texas		–		2	–	9	–	0
Tulane		–		2	–	9	–	0
Rankings from AP Poll

The 1995 Memphis Tigers football team represented the University of Memphis as an independent during the 1995 NCAA Division I-A football season. Led by first-year head coach Rip Scherer, the Tigers compiled a record of 3–8. Memphis played home games at the Liberty Bowl Memorial Stadium in Memphis, Tennessee.

== Schedule ==
Date	Opponent	Site	Result	Attendance	Source
September 2	at Mississippi State	Scott Field; Starkville, MS	L 18–28	36,324	
September 9	at No. 11 Michigan	Michigan Stadium; Ann Arbor, MI	L 7–24	100,862	
September 16	Southwestern Louisiana	Liberty Bowl Memorial Stadium; Memphis, TN	W 33–19	17,230	
September 23	at Arkansas	War Memorial Stadium; Little Rock, AR	L 20–27	54,418	
September 30	Louisville	Liberty Bowl Memorial Stadium; Memphis, TN (rivalry)	L 7–17	29,968	
October 14	at Tulane	Superdome; New Orleans, LA	W 23–8	19,894	
October 21	at Cincinnati	Nippert Stadium; Cincinnati, OH (rivalry)	L 3–28	20,499	
October 28	Tulsa	Liberty Bowl Memorial Stadium; Memphis, TN	W 10–7	12,798	
November 4	Ole Miss^{†}	Liberty Bowl Memorial Stadium; Memphis, TN (rivalry)	L 3-34	28,130	
November 11	Southern Miss	Liberty Bowl Memorial Stadium; Memphis, TN (Black and Blue Bowl)	L 9–17	11,503	
November 18	at East Carolina	Dowdy–Ficklen Stadium; Greenville, NC	L 17–31	27,125	
^{†}Homecoming; Rankings from AP Poll released prior to the game
