= 1995 Navy Midshipmen football team =

American college football season

1995 Navy Midshipmen football
- Conference: Independent
- Record: 5–6
- Head coach: Charlie Weatherbie (1st season)
- Offensive coordinator: Paul Johnson (1st season)
- Offensive scheme: Triple option
- Defensive coordinator: Dick Bumpas (1st season)
- Base defense: 4–2–5
- MVP: Andy Thompson
- Captains: Garrett Smith; Andy Thompson
- Home stadium: Navy–Marine Corps Memorial Stadium

1995 NCAA Division I-A independents football records
	Conf.			Overall
Team	W	L	T	W		L		T
No. 11 Notre Dame		–		9	–	3	–	0
East Carolina		–		9	–	3	–	0
Louisville		–		7	–	4	–	0
Cincinnati		–		6	–	5	–	0
Southern Miss		–		6	–	5	–	0
Army		–		5	–	5	–	1
Navy		–		5	–	6	–	0
Tulsa		–		4	–	7	–	0
Memphis		–		3	–	8	–	0
Northeast Louisiana		–		2	–	9	–	0
North Texas		–		2	–	9	–	0
Tulane		–		2	–	9	–	0
Rankings from AP Poll

The 1995 Navy Midshipmen football team represented the United States Naval Academy (USNA) as an independent during the 1995 NCAA Division I-A football season. The team was led by first-year head coach Charlie Weatherbie. Sportswriter John Feinstein followed and covered the team for the duration of its season for his 1996 book 'A Civil War' about the Army–Navy Rivalry.

== Schedule ==
Date	Time	Opponent	Site	TV	Result	Attendance	Source
September 9	8:00 p.m.	at SMU	Cotton Bowl; Dallas, TX (rivalry)		W 33–2	20,302	
September 16		at Rutgers	Rutgers Stadium; Piscataway, NJ		L 17–27	33,820	
September 23		Wake Forest	Navy–Marine Corps Memorial Stadium; Annapolis, MD		L 7–30	25,380	
September 30		at Duke	Wallace Wade Stadium; Durham, NC		W 30–9	29,400	
October 7	1:30 p.m.	Virginia Tech	Navy–Marine Corps Memorial Stadium; Annapolis, MD		L 0–14	31,114	
October 14		Air Force	Navy–Marine Corps Memorial Stadium; Annapolis, MD (Commander-in-Chief's Trophy)		L 20–30		
October 21		Villanova^{†}	Navy–Marine Corps Memorial Stadium; Annapolis, MD		W 20–14	26,726	
November 4	1:30 p.m.	at Notre Dame	Notre Dame Stadium; Notre Dame, IN (rivalry)	NBC	L 17–35	59,075	
November 11		No. 4 (I-AA) Delaware	Navy–Marine Corps Memorial Stadium; Annapolis, MD		W 31–7		
November 18		Tulane	Navy–Marine Corps Memorial Stadium; Annapolis, MD		W 35–7	19,815	
December 2		vs. Army	Veterans Stadium; Philadelphia, PA (Army–Navy Game)	ABC	L 13–14		
^{†}Homecoming; Rankings from The Sports Network Poll released prior to the game

== Roster ==
1995 Navy Midshipmen football team roster
Players
Coaches
Offense

Pos.	#	Name	Class
WR	84	LeBron Butts	So
FB	26	Tim Cannada	So
C	55	Brian Drechsler	So
G	69	J. D. Gainey	So
QB	7	Chris McCoy	So
OT	72	Bryce Minamyer	Sr
WR	87	Neal Plaskonos	Jr
RB	20	Cory Schemm	Jr
WR	2	Matt Scornavacchi	Sr
G	63	Garrett Smith	Sr
WR	17	Will Smith	Jr
OT	70	Jeff Zimmerman	Jr

Defense

Pos.	#	Name	Class
DB	6	Gervy Alota	So
CB	29	Sean Andrews	So
LB	51	Clint Bruce	Jr
LB	50	Travis Cooley	So
DT	99	Mark Hammond	Sr
LB	52	Fernando Harris	Sr
DT	95	Chad Holzapfel	Jr
DB	43	Kevin Lewis	So
DE	56	Michael Ogden	So
{{{pos}}}	57	Andy Person	Sr
DE	96	Carl Quinn	Jr
DB	13	Joe Speed	Sr
DB	32	Andy Thompson	Sr
DT	91	David Viger	So

Special teams

Pos.	#	Name	Class

Head coach

- Charlie Weatherbie

Coordinators/assistant coaches

Legend

- (C) Team captain
- (S) Suspended
- (I) Ineligible
- Injured
- Redshirt
