= 1995 North Texas Mean Green football team =

American college football season

1995 North Texas Mean Green football
- Conference: Independent
- Record: 2–9
- Head coach: Matt Simon (2nd season)
- Offensive coordinator: Steve Kragthorpe (2nd season)
- Defensive coordinator: James Bell (2nd season)
- Home stadium: Fouts Field

1995 NCAA Division I-A independents football records
| | Conf. | | | Overall |
| Team | W | L | T | W | | L | | T |
|---|---|---|---|---|---|---|---|---|
| No. 11 Notre Dame | | – | | 9 | – | 3 | – | 0 |
| East Carolina | | – | | 9 | – | 3 | – | 0 |
| Louisville | | – | | 7 | – | 4 | – | 0 |
| Cincinnati | | – | | 6 | – | 5 | – | 0 |
| Southern Miss | | – | | 6 | – | 5 | – | 0 |
| Army | | – | | 5 | – | 5 | – | 1 |
| Navy | | – | | 5 | – | 6 | – | 0 |
| Tulsa | | – | | 4 | – | 7 | – | 0 |
| Memphis | | – | | 3 | – | 8 | – | 0 |
| Northeast Louisiana | | – | | 2 | – | 9 | – | 0 |
| North Texas | | – | | 2 | – | 9 | – | 0 |
| Tulane | | – | | 2 | – | 9 | – | 0 |
Rankings from AP Poll

The 1995 North Texas Mean Green football team represented the University of North Texas as an independent during the 1995 NCAA Division I-A football season. Led by second-year head coach Matt Simon, the Mean Green compiled a record of 2–9. North Texas played home games at the Fouts Field in Denton, Texas

The 1995 season marked the return of NCAA Division I-A football to Denton for the first time since 1982. North Texas had competed in the Southland Conference at the NCAA Division I-AA level from 1983 to 1994 after the university's athletic department fell on hard financial times following the departure of head coach and athletic director Hayden Fry to the University of Iowa. The 1995 North Texas team was considered a transitional NCAA Division I-A member, and was not bowl eligible, regardless of whether the Mean Green met the required six wins.

== Schedule ==
| Date | Time | Opponent | Site | Result | Attendance | Source |
|---|---|---|---|---|---|---|
| September 2 | 7:00 p.m. | at Missouri* | Faurot Field; Columbia, MO | L 7–28 | 47,214 | |
| September 9 | 1:30 p.m. | vs. Kansas* | Texas Stadium; Irving, TX | L 10–27 | 20,211 | |
| September 16 | | Oregon State* | Fouts Field; Denton, TX | W 30–27 | 18,613 | |
| September 23 | 1:30 p.m. | at No. 10 Oklahoma* | Oklahoma Memorial Stadium; Norman, OK | L 10–51 | 65,829 | |
| October 7 | | at Nevada* | Mackay Stadium; Reno, NV | L 24–56 | 18,458 | |
| October 14 | 1:30 p.m. | UAB*^{†} | Fouts Field; Denton, TX | L 14–19 | 16,671 | |
| October 21 | 7:00 p.m. | at LSU* | Tiger Stadium; Baton Rouge, LA | L 7–49 | 66,870 | |
| October 28 | 2:30 p.m. | at No. 18 Alabama* | Bryant–Denny Stadium; Tuscaloosa, AL | L 19–38 | 70,123 | |
| November 4 | | at UNLV* | Sam Boyd Stadium; Whitney, NV | L 24–34 | 5,389 | |
| November 11 | | Idaho State* | Fouts Field; Denton, TX | W 41–38 | | |
| November 18 | | at Louisville* | Cardinal Stadium; Louisville, KY | L 14–57 | 26,577 | |
*Non-conference game; ^{†}Homecoming; Rankings from AP Poll released prior to the game

== Expanded Fouts Field ==
As part of a coordinated effort by the athletic department and donors to bring attendance levels up to Division I-A standards, donors and boosters alike bought out large sections of seats at Fouts Field to spike attendance numbers. In addition to this, the university expanded the stadium itself, adding two sections of metal bleachers in the east and west end zones to bring the total capacity of the venue from 20,000 to 30,500. Fouts Field's capacity would remain at 30,500 for the rest of its time as an NCAA football stadium, until both sections of metal bleachers and the north grandstand were demolished in 2013, two years after North Texas moved across I-35E to new Apogee Stadium.

== The "Schedule from Hell" ==
Without any conference games to be tied to and no bowl game in the cards as a transitional Division I-A member, North Texas' athletic department opted to schedule multiple "Guarantee Games" to help improve the department's financial outlook moving forward as a full Division I-A member. The 1995 team thus played only three true home games in Denton. One other "home" game against Kansas, from the Big Eight Conference, was moved to the larger Texas Stadium in nearby Irving to help increase ticket sales with the expected influx of Jayhawks fans. The Mean Green played seven road games in all, with two against other Big Eight schools (Missouri and #10 Oklahoma), two against Southeastern Conference programs (LSU and Alabama), then-independent Louisville, future Big West Conference foe Nevada, and Big West member UNLV, who departed for the Western Athletic Conference in 1996.

The lone reprieve in the scheduling gauntlet was a home game against Oregon State (from the Pacific-10 Conference), the first Division I-A game at Fouts Field since 1983. The Mean Green upset the favored Beavers, 30–27, who went on to finish their season 1–10. North Texas' only other win on the year was against Division I-AA member Idaho State.
