= Dolinsky (inhabited locality) =

Dolinsky (Russian: Долинский; masculine), Dolinskaya (Долинская; feminine), or Dolinskoye (Долинское; neuter) is the name of several rural localities in Russia:

- Dolinsky (rural locality), a settlement in Groznensky District of the Chechen Republic
- Dolinskoye, Russia, a selo in Tulatinsky Selsoviet of Charyshsky District of Altai Krai
