= Anthony Ladd =

American football player (born 1973)

No. 88, 18
- Position: Wide receiver

Personal information
- Born: December 23, 1973 (age 52); Homestead, Florida, U.S.
- Listed height: 6 ft 1 in (1.85 m)
- Listed weight: 188 lb (85 kg)

Career information
- High school: Homestead
- College: Cincinnati
- NFL draft: 1997: undrafted

Career history
- Atlanta Falcons (1997)*; Tampa Bay Buccaneers (1997)*; New England Patriots (1997–1998); → Barcelona Dragons (1998); Berlin Thunder (2000); Philadelphia Eagles (2000)*; Chicago Rush (2001-2004); Dallas Desperados (2004); Las Vegas Gladiators (2004)
- * Offseason or practice squad member only
- Stats at Pro Football Reference

Anthony Ladd (born December 23, 1973) is an American former professional football player who was a wide receiver for one season with the New England Patriots of the National Football League (NFL). He also played in NFL Europe and in the Arena Football League (AFL). He played college football for the Cincinnati Bearcats.

== Early life ==
Anthony Ladd was born on December 23, 1973, in Homestead, Florida. He went to high school at Homestead (FL).

== College career ==
He went to college at Cincinnati. In 1993 he had 10 catches for 170 yards. In 1994 he had 35 catches for 446 yards and 3 touchdowns. The next year he had 34 catches for 433 yards and three touchdowns. He also had one rush for 5 yards. His final year of college he had 21 catches for 409 yards and three touchdowns.

=== Career statistics ===
Year	Games	Rec	Yds	Avg	TD	Rush	Yds	Avg	TD
1993	10	10	170	17.0	0	0	0	0.0	0
1994	11	35	446	12.7	3	0	0	0.0	0
1995	11	34	433	12.7	3	1	5	5.0	0
1996	11	21	409	19.5	3	0	0	0.0	0
Career	43	100	1,458	14.6	9	1	5	5.0	0

== Professional career ==
=== Barcelona Dragons ===
In 1998 he played for the Barcelona Dragons of the NFL Europe. He had 8 catches for 139 yards.

=== New England Patriots ===
Later in the year he played for the New England Patriots. He played in 3 games but had no statistics.

=== Berlin Thunder ===
In 2000, he played for the Berlin Thunder. He played in 10 games and had 19 catches for 238 yards and three touchdowns.

=== Chicago Rush ===
In 2001, he played for the Chicago Rush of the Arena Football League. He played in 3 games and had 8 catches for 87 yards. He also had three touchdowns. In 2002 he played for them and had 41 catches for 449 yards and 13 touchdowns. He also had 4 rushes for 2 yards and a touchdown. The next year he had 33 catches for 402 yards and 11 touchdowns. He also had 2 rushing touchdowns. He even had 2 interceptions on defense. His final season was 2004, where he played for 3 teams. With the Rush, he had 8 catches for 65 yards and 2 touchdowns.

=== Dallas Desperado ===
His second team of 2004 was the Dallas Desperados. With them he had 4 catches for 31 yards.

=== Las Vegas Gladiators ===
His final team was the Las Vegas Gladiators. He had 3 catches for 36 yards with them.

== Career stats ==
=== Receiving and Rushing ===
Year	Team	Games	Rec	Yds	Avg	TD	Rush	Yds	Avg	TD
1998	BAR		8	139	17.4	0	0	0	0.0	0
1998	NE	3	0	0	0.0	0	0	0	0.0	0
1998	Total		8	139	17.4	0	0	0	0	0
2000	BER	10	19	238	12.5	3	0	0	0.0	0
2001	CHI	3	8	87	10.9	3	0	0	0.0	0
2002	CHI	14	41	449	11.0	13	4	2	0.5	1
2003	CHI	15	33	402	12.2	11	6	20	3.3	2
2004	CHI	3	8	65	8.1	2	0	0	0.0	0
2004	DAL	2	4	31	7.8	0	0	0	0.0	0
2004	LVG	5	3	36	12.0	0	0	0	0.0	0
2004	Total	10	15	132	8.8	2	0	0	0.0	0
Career		55	124	1447	11.7	32	10	22	2.2	3
