= 1995 Northeast Louisiana Indians football team =

American college football season

1995 Northeast Louisiana Indians football
- Conference: Independent
- Record: 2–9
- Head coach: Ed Zaunbrecher (2nd season)
- Offensive coordinator: Ed Zaunbrecher (2nd season)
- Defensive coordinator: Dave Dunkelberger (2nd season)
- Home stadium: Malone Stadium

1995 NCAA Division I-A independents football records
	Conf.			Overall
Team	W	L	T	W		L		T
No. 11 Notre Dame		–		9	–	3	–	0
East Carolina		–		9	–	3	–	0
Louisville		–		7	–	4	–	0
Cincinnati		–		6	–	5	–	0
Southern Miss		–		6	–	5	–	0
Army		–		5	–	5	–	1
Navy		–		5	–	6	–	0
Tulsa		–		4	–	7	–	0
Memphis		–		3	–	8	–	0
Northeast Louisiana		–		2	–	9	–	0
North Texas		–		2	–	9	–	0
Tulane		–		2	–	9	–	0
Rankings from AP Poll

The 1995 Northeast Louisiana Indians football team represented Northeast Louisiana University (now known as the University of Louisiana at Monroe) as an independent during the 1995 NCAA Division I-A football season. Led by second-year head coach Ed Zaunbrecher, the Indians compiled an overall record of 2–9, and the offense scored 233 points while the defense allowed 413 points. The team played home games at Malone Stadium in Monroe, Louisiana.

== Schedule ==
Date	Time	Opponent	Site	Result	Attendance	Source
September 2	9:00 pm	at Fresno State	Bulldog Stadium; Fresno, CA	L 17–31	33,155	
September 9	7:00 pm	Nicholls State	Malone Stadium; Monroe, LA	W 34–21	19,470	
September 16	1:00 pm	at No. 9 Colorado	Folsom Field; Boulder, CO	L 14–66	44,016	
September 23	1:00 pm	at Missouri	Faurot Field; Columbia, MO	L 22–31	38,758	
September 30	6:00 pm	at Mississippi State	Scott Field; Starkville, MS	W 34–32	30,809	
October 7	7:00 pm	No. 6 (I-AA) Troy State	Malone Stadium; Monroe, LA	L 10–20	19,267	
October 14	9:00 pm	at Nevada	Mackay Stadium; Reno, NV	L 35–59	20,118	
October 21	7:00 pm	No. 19 (I-AA) Northwestern State	Malone Stadium; Monroe, LA	L 39–42	16,682	
October 28	7:00 pm	UCF	Malone Stadium; Monroe, LA	L 14–34	16,808	
November 4	1:00 pm	at No. 21 Auburn	Jordan-Hare Stadium; Auburn, AL	L 14–38	78,149	
November 11	3:00 pm	at Louisville	Cardinal Stadium; Louisville, KY	L 0–39	25,212	
Rankings from AP Poll released prior to the game; All times are in Central time
