= 1995 Louisville Cardinals football team =

American college football season

1995 Louisville Cardinals football
- Conference: Independent
- Record: 7–4
- Head coach: Ron Cooper (1st season)
- Offensive coordinator: Bret Ingalls (1st season)
- Defensive coordinator: Everett Withers (1st season)
- Home stadium: Cardinal Stadium

1995 NCAA Division I-A independents football records
	Conf.			Overall
Team	W	L	T	W		L		T
No. 11 Notre Dame		–		9	–	3	–	0
East Carolina		–		9	–	3	–	0
Louisville		–		7	–	4	–	0
Cincinnati		–		6	–	5	–	0
Southern Miss		–		6	–	5	–	0
Army		–		5	–	5	–	1
Navy		–		5	–	6	–	0
Tulsa		–		4	–	7	–	0
Memphis		–		3	–	8	–	0
Northeast Louisiana		–		2	–	9	–	0
North Texas		–		2	–	9	–	0
Tulane		–		2	–	9	–	0
Rankings from AP Poll

The 1995 Louisville Cardinals football team represented the University of Louisville as an independent during the 1995 NCAA Division I-A football season. Led by first-year head coach Ron Cooper, the Cardinals compiled a record of 7–4. The team played home games in Cardinal Stadium in Louisville, Kentucky.

== Schedule ==
Date	Opponent	Site	Result	Attendance	Source
September 2	at Kentucky	Commonwealth Stadium; Lexington, KY (Governor's Cup)	W 13–10	58,967	
September 9	at Northern Illinois	Huskie Stadium; DeKalb, IL	W 34–21	22,357	
September 16	Michigan State	Cardinal Stadium; Louisville, KY	L 7–30	34,027	
September 21	North Carolina	Cardinal Stadium; Louisville, KY	L 10–17	37,704	
September 30	at Memphis	Liberty Bowl Memorial Stadium; Memphis, TN (rivalry)	W 17–7	29,968	
October 7	at Southern Miss	M. M. Roberts Stadium; Hattiesburg, MS	L 21–25	21,079	
October 14	at Wyoming	War Memorial Stadium; Laramie, WY	L 20–27	22,418	
October 28	Maryland^{†}	Cardinal Stadium; Louisville, KY	W 31–0	36,386	
November 4	Tulane	Cardinal Stadium; Louisville, KY	W 34–14	33,271	
November 11	Northeast Louisiana	Cardinal Stadium; Louisville, KY	W 39–0	25,212	
November 18	North Texas	Cardinal Stadium; Louisville, KY	W 57–14	26,577	
^{†}Homecoming

== Roster ==
1995 Louisville Cardinals football team roster
Players
Coaches
Offense

Pos.	#	Name	Class
OT	72	Roman Oben

Defense

Pos.	#	Name	Class
LB	59	Alan Campos	Sr
CB	1	Rico Clark	Jr
CB	13	Sam Madison	Jr
LB	52	Tyrus McCloud	Jr

Special teams

Pos.	#	Name	Class
K	39	David Akers	Jr
P	38	Jeremy Borseth	Fr

Head coach

- Ron Cooper

Coordinators/assistant coaches

Legend

- (C) Team captain
- (S) Suspended
- (I) Ineligible
- Injured
- Redshirt
