= Jerris McPhail =

American football player (born 1972)

No. 32, 21
- Position: Running back

Personal information
- Born: June 26, 1972 (age 54); Clinton, North Carolina, U.S.
- Listed height: 5 ft 11 in (1.80 m)
- Listed weight: 198 lb (90 kg)

Career information
- High school: Clinton
- College: Wake Forest; East Carolina
- NFL draft: 1996: 5th round, 134th overall pick
- Expansion draft: 1999: 1st round, 36th overall pick

Career history
- Miami Dolphins (1996–1997); Detroit Lions (1998); Cleveland Browns (1999)*; Detroit Lions (1999)*
- * Offseason or practice squad member only

Career NFL statistics
- Rushing yards: 174
- Rushing average: 7.6
- Receptions: 54
- Receiving yards: 544
- Total touchdowns: 2
- Stats at Pro Football Reference

Jerris Cornelius McPhail (born June 26, 1976) is an American former professional football player who was a running back in the National Football League (NFL) for three seasons for the Miami Dolphins and Detroit Lions. He played college football for the Wake Forest Demon Deacons and East Carolina Pirates McPhail was selected by the Dolphins in the fifth round with the 134th overall pick in the 1996 NFL draft. In Week 9 of the 1997 against the Chicago Bears, he scored the only two touchdowns of his career in a 36–33 loss.
