= 1995 Southern Miss Golden Eagles football team =

American college football season

1995 Southern Miss Golden Eagles football
- Conference: Independent
- Record: 6–5
- Head coach: Jeff Bower (5th season)
- Offensive coordinator: Norman Joseph (2nd season)
- Offensive scheme: Multiple
- Defensive coordinator: John Thompson (4th season)
- Base defense: Multiple
- Home stadium: M. M. Roberts Stadium

1995 NCAA Division I-A independents football records
	Conf.			Overall
Team	W	L	T	W		L		T
No. 11 Notre Dame		–		9	–	3	–	0
East Carolina		–		9	–	3	–	0
Louisville		–		7	–	4	–	0
Cincinnati		–		6	–	5	–	0
Southern Miss		–		6	–	5	–	0
Army		–		5	–	5	–	1
Navy		–		5	–	6	–	0
Tulsa		–		4	–	7	–	0
Memphis		–		3	–	8	–	0
Northeast Louisiana		–		2	–	9	–	0
North Texas		–		2	–	9	–	0
Tulane		–		2	–	9	–	0
Rankings from AP Poll

The 1995 Southern Miss Golden Eagles football team was an American football team that represented the University of Southern Mississippi as an independent during the 1995 NCAA Division I-A football season. In their fifth year under head coach Jeff Bower, the team compiled a 6–5 record.

== Schedule ==
Date	Opponent	Site	Result	Attendance	Source
August 31	Northern Illinois	M. M. Roberts Stadium; Hattiesburg, MS	W 45–13	33,092	
September 9	at No. 13 Alabama	Legion Field; Birmingham, AL	L 20–24	83,091	
September 16	at Utah State	Romney Stadium; Logan, UT	W 24–21	15,227	
September 23	at Indiana	Memorial Stadium; Bloomington, IN	L 26–27	31,216	
September 30	Tulane	M. M. Roberts Stadium; Hattiesburg, MS (rivalry)	W 45–0	27,141	
October 7	Louisville	M. M. Roberts Stadium; Hattiesburg, MS	W 25–21	21,079	
October 14	at Cincinnati	Nippert Stadium; Cincinnati, OH	L 13–16	18,522	
October 28	East Carolina^{†}	M. M. Roberts Stadium; Hattiesburg, MS	L 34–36	21,293	
November 4	at No. 5 Tennessee	Neyland Stadium; Knoxville, TN	L 0–42	93,433	
November 11	at Memphis	Liberty Bowl Memorial Stadium; Memphis, TN (rivalry)	W 17–9	11,503	
November 18	at Southwestern Louisiana	Cajun Field; Lafayette, LA	W 35–32	19,341	
^{†}Homecoming; Rankings from AP Poll released prior to the game
