= 1995 Army Cadets football team =

American college football season

1995 Army Cadets football
- Conference: Independent
- Record: 5–5–1
- Head coach: Bob Sutton (5th season)
- Offensive coordinator: Greg Gregory (7th as OC; 14th overall season)
- Offensive scheme: Triple option
- Defensive coordinator: Denny Doornbos (5th season)
- Base defense: 4–3
- Captains: Jim Cantelupe; Joel Davis
- Home stadium: Michie Stadium

1995 NCAA Division I-A independents football records
	Conf.			Overall
Team	W	L	T	W		L		T
No. 11 Notre Dame		–		9	–	3	–	0
East Carolina		–		9	–	3	–	0
Louisville		–		7	–	4	–	0
Cincinnati		–		6	–	5	–	0
Southern Miss		–		6	–	5	–	0
Army		–		5	–	5	–	1
Navy		–		5	–	6	–	0
Tulsa		–		4	–	7	–	0
Memphis		–		3	–	8	–	0
Northeast Louisiana		–		2	–	9	–	0
North Texas		–		2	–	9	–	0
Tulane		–		2	–	9	–	0
Rankings from AP Poll

The 1995 Army Cadets football team was an American football team that represented the United States Military Academy as an independent during the 1995 NCAA Division I-A football season. In their fifth season under head coach Bob Sutton, the Cadets compiled a 5–5–1 record and outscored their opponents by a combined total of 325 to 211. In the annual Army–Navy Game, the Cadets defeated Navy, 14–13. Sportswriter John Feinstein followed and covered the team for the duration of its season for his 1996 book 'A Civil War' about the Army–Navy Rivalry.

== Schedule ==
Date	Time	Opponent	Site	Result	Attendance	Source
September 9		Lehigh	Michie Stadium; West Point, NY	W 42–9	25,631	
September 16		Duke	Michie Stadium; West Point, NY	L 21–23	33,031	
September 23	3:30 p.m.	at No. 22 Washington	Husky Stadium; Seattle, WA	L 13–21	76,125	
September 30		Rice	Michie Stadium; West Point, NY	T 21–21		
October 14	12:00 p.m.	vs. No. 17 Notre Dame	Giants Stadium; East Rutherford, NJ (rivalry)	L 27–28	74,218	
October 21		at Boston College	Alumni Stadium; Chestnut Hill, MA	W 49–7	44,500	
October 28		Colgate	Michie Stadium; West Point, NY	W 56–14	37,292	
November 4	1:30 p.m.	East Carolina	Michie Stadium; West Point, NY	L 25–31	31,743	
November 11		at Air Force	Falcon Stadium; Colorado Springs, CO (Commander-in-Chief's Trophy)	L 20–38		
November 18		Bucknell	Michie Stadium; West Point, NY	W 37–6	30,023	
December 2		vs. Navy	Veterans Stadium; Philadelphia, PA (Army–Navy Game)	W 14–13		
Rankings from AP Poll released prior to the game; All times are in Eastern time

== Game summaries ==
=== Navy ===
Army Cadets vs. Navy Midshipmen

Quarter	1	2	3	4	Total
Navy	7	0	3	3	13
Army	7	0	0	7	14

at Veterans Stadium • Philadelphia, Pennsylvania

- Date: December 2
- TV announcers (ABC): Mark Jones and Todd Blackledge

== Roster ==
1995 Army Cadets football team roster
Players
Coaches
Offense

Pos.	#	Name	Class
RB	1	Steve Carpenter	Sr
FB		John Conroy
WR	88	John Graves
TE	84	Ron Leshinski	Jr
QB	7	Ronnie McAda	Jr
C	55	Kyle Scott	Jr
OT	56	Mike Wells	Sr

Defense

Pos.	#	Name	Class
DE		Anthony Bianchi	Jr
LB		Thomas Burrell	Sr
DB		Jim Cantelupe (C)
DT	95	Scott Eichelberger	Jr
DB	9	Derek Klein	Sr
LB		Ben Kotwica	Jr

Special teams

Pos.	#	Name	Class

Head coach

- Bob Sutton

Coordinators/assistant coaches

Legend

- (C) Team captain
- (S) Suspended
- (I) Ineligible
- Injured
- Redshirt
