= 1995 Tulsa Golden Hurricane football team =

American college football season

1995 Tulsa Golden Hurricane football
- Conference: Independent
- Record: 4–7
- Head coach: David Rader (8th season)
- Offensive coordinator: Mark Thomas (3rd season)
- Defensive coordinator: Mike Knoll (7th season)
- Home stadium: Skelly Stadium

1995 NCAA Division I-A independents football records
	Conf.			Overall
Team	W	L	T	W		L		T
No. 11 Notre Dame		–		9	–	3	–	0
East Carolina		–		9	–	3	–	0
Louisville		–		7	–	4	–	0
Cincinnati		–		6	–	5	–	0
Southern Miss		–		6	–	5	–	0
Army		–		5	–	5	–	1
Navy		–		5	–	6	–	0
Tulsa		–		4	–	7	–	0
Memphis		–		3	–	8	–	0
Northeast Louisiana		–		2	–	9	–	0
North Texas		–		2	–	9	–	0
Tulane		–		2	–	9	–	0
Rankings from AP Poll

The 1995 Tulsa Golden Hurricane football team represented the University of Tulsa during the 1995 NCAA Division I-A football season. In their eighth year under head coach David Rader, the Golden Hurricane compiled a 4–7 record. The team's statistical leaders included quarterback Troy DeGar with 1,304 passing yards, Reggie Williams with 729 rushing yards, and Michael Kedzior with 620 receiving yards.

== Schedule ==
Date	Opponent	Site	Result	Attendance	Source
September 2	Baylor	Skelly Stadium; Tulsa, OK	L 5–37	27,133	
September 9	Oklahoma State	Skelly Stadium; Tulsa, OK (rivalry)	W 24–23	31,963	
September 16	at No. 3 Texas A&M	Kyle Field; College Station, TX	L 9–52	57,067	
September 23	East Tennessee State	Skelly Stadium; Tulsa, OK	W 45–20	17,836	
September 30	at Louisiana Tech	Independence Stadium; Shreveport, LA	L 23–27	18,695	
October 7	Wyoming^{†}	Skelly Stadium; Tulsa, OK	W 35–6	20,003	
October 14	at UTEP	Sun Bowl; El Paso, TX	W 38–28	19,931	
October 28	at Memphis	Liberty Bowl Memorial Stadium; Memphis, TN	L 7–10	12,798	
November 4	at BYU	Cougar Stadium; Provo, UT	L 35–45	63,754	
November 11	at East Carolina	Dowdy–Ficklen Stadium; Greenville, NC	L 7–28	26,410	
November 18	Cincinnati	Skelly Stadium; Tulsa, OK	L 5–24	19,312	
^{†}Homecoming; Rankings from AP Poll released prior to the game

== After the season ==
=== 1996 NFL draft ===
The following Golden Hurricane player was selected in the 1996 NFL draft following the season.

Round	Pick	Player	Position	NFL club
7	220	Sedric Clark	Linebacker	Oakland Raiders
