= 1995 Tulane Green Wave football team =

American college football season

1995 Tulane Green Wave football
- Conference: Independent
- Record: 2–9
- Head coach: Buddy Teevens (4th season)
- Offensive coordinator: Frank Monica (1st as OC, 9th overall season)
- Defensive coordinator: Vic Eumont (2nd season)
- Home stadium: Louisiana Superdome

1995 NCAA Division I-A independents football records
	Conf.			Overall
Team	W	L	T	W		L		T
No. 11 Notre Dame		–		9	–	3	–	0
East Carolina		–		9	–	3	–	0
Louisville		–		7	–	4	–	0
Cincinnati		–		6	–	5	–	0
Southern Miss		–		6	–	5	–	0
Army		–		5	–	5	–	1
Navy		–		5	–	6	–	0
Tulsa		–		4	–	7	–	0
Memphis		–		3	–	8	–	0
Northeast Louisiana		–		2	–	9	–	0
North Texas		–		2	–	9	–	0
Tulane		–		2	–	9	–	0
Rankings from AP Poll

The 1995 Tulane Green Wave football team was an American football team that represented Tulane University during the 1995 NCAA Division I-A football season as an independent. In their fourth year under head coach Buddy Teevens, the team compiled a 2–9 record.

For the first time since 1910 (not counting 1918, when World War I forced both schools to cancel their respective seasons), Tulane did not play in-state rival LSU in the Battle for the Rag.

== Schedule ==
Date	Opponent	Site	Result	Attendance	Source
September 2	Maryland	Louisiana Superdome; New Orleans, LA	L 10–29	18,159	
September 9	Wake Forest	Louisiana Superdome; New Orleans, LA	W 35–9	16,368	
September 16	at Rice	Rice Stadium; Houston, TX	W 17–15	18,100	
September 30	at Southern Miss	M. M. Roberts Stadium; Hattiesburg, MS (rivalry)	L 0–45	27,141	
October 7	at Ole Miss	Vaught–Hemingway Stadium; Oxford, MS (rivalry)	L 17–20	26,683	
October 14	Memphis	Louisiana Superdome; New Orleans, LA	L 8–23	19,894	
October 21	at TCU	Amon G. Carter Stadium; Fort Worth, TX	L 11–16	25,421	
October 28	Southwestern Louisiana	Louisiana Superdome; New Orleans, LA	L 28–32	20,801	
November 4	at Louisville	Cardinal Stadium; Louisville, KY	L 14–34	33,271	
November 11	Rutgers	Louisiana Superdome; New Orleans, LA	L 40–45	16,098	
November 18	at Navy	Navy–Marine Corps Memorial Stadium; Annapolis, MD	L 7–35	19,815	

== Roster ==
1995 Tulane Green Wave football team roster
Players
Coaches
Offense

Pos.	#	Name	Class
WR	2	Jeff Liggon	Jr
WR	7	Derrick Franklin	Jr
WR	8	P. J. Franklin	Fr
QB	10	Shaun King	Fr
TB	33	Jerald Sowell	Jr
TE	85	Cory Geason	So

Defense

Pos.	#	Name	Class
DT	65	Dennis O'Sullivan	Fr

Special teams

Pos.	#	Name	Class

Head coach

- Buddy Teevens

Coordinators/assistant coaches

Legend

- (C) Team captain
- (S) Suspended
- (I) Ineligible
- Injured
- Redshirt
