= Joel Dolinski =

American football player and coach (born 1975)

Biographical details
- Born: April 1975 (age 51); Sewickley, Pennsylvania

Playing career
- 1994–1997: Cincinnati
- Position: Offensive lineman

Coaching career (HC unless noted)
- 1998: Bethany (WV) (OL)
- 1999–2001: Cincinnati (GA)
- 2005: Seton Hill (OL)
- 2006: Seton Hill (GC)
- 2007: Seton Hill (OC)
- 2008–2012: Seton Hill

Head coaching record
- Overall: 14–43
- Tournaments: 1–1 (NCAA D-II playoffs)

Joel Dolinski is an American football coach. He served as the head football coach at Seton Hill University from 2008 through 2012.

== Head coaching record ==
Year	Team	Overall	Conference	Standing	Bowl/playoffs
Seton Hill Griffins (West Virginia Intercollegiate Athletic Conference) (2008–2012)
2008	Seton Hill	10–3			NCAA Division II Second Round
2009	Seton Hill	1–10	0–8		
2010	Seton Hill	2–9	1–7		
2011	Seton Hill	1–10	1–7		
2012	Seton Hill	0–11	0–8		
Seton Hill:		14–43			
Total:		14–43			
