= Darrin Simmons =

American football coach (born 1973)

Cincinnati Bengals
- Title: Assistant head coach & special teams coordinator

Personal information
- Born: April 9, 1973 (age 53); Elkhart, Kansas, U.S.

Career information
- Position: Punter
- High school: Elkhart (KS)
- College: Dodge City CC (1991–1992); Kansas (1993–1995)

Career history
- Kansas (1996) Graduate assistant; Minnesota (1997) Graduate assistant; Baltimore Ravens (1998) Assistant special teams coordinator & assistant strength and conditioning coach; Carolina Panthers (1999–2002) Assistant special teams coordinator & assistant strength and conditioning coach; Cincinnati Bengals (2003–2019) Special teams coordinator; Cincinnati Bengals (2020–present) Assistant head coach & special teams coordinator

Awards and highlights
- Second-team All-Big Eight (1995); 2nd-team NJCAA All-American (1992)

Darrin Simmons (born April 9, 1973) is an American football coach who is the assistant head coach and special teams coordinator for the Cincinnati Bengals of the National Football League (NFL). He has coached for the Bengals since 2003. He previously had coaching stints in the NFL with the Baltimore Ravens and Carolina Panthers. He was a punter in college at the University of Kansas.

== Playing career ==
=== Dodge City CC ===
Simmons played punter at Dodge City Community College from 1991 to 1992. In 1992 at Dodge City, he led the nation in punting and was a second-team NJCAA All-American.

=== Kansas ===
Simmons then transferred to Kansas (KU) where he played from 1993 to 1995, earning All-Big Eight honors his final year. As a senior, he helped the Jayhawks to a Top-10 national ranking and a Aloha Bowl victory over UCLA. Also as a senior at KU, he won honors as an Academic All-American.

== Coaching career ==
=== Early jobs ===
Simmons began his coaching career as a graduate assistant at the University of Kansas in 1996, where he would serve in that position for a single season. The following year, he became the graduate assistant at the University of Minnesota, serving for a single season as well. In 1999, he got his first NFL coaching position as the Assistant special teams coordinator and Assistant strength and conditioning coach for the Baltimore Ravens with his uncle, Jerry Simmons. He held the position for one season.

=== Carolina Panthers ===
Simmons was hired in 1999 by the Carolina Panthers following his uncle, Jerry. Panthers punter Todd Sauerbrun was named All-Pro two of the four seasons he coached the Panthers.

=== Cincinnati Bengals ===
Simmons was hired by the Cincinnati Bengals as their special teams coordinator in 2003. In 2005, Bengals kicker Shayne Graham was named All-Pro. That season the Bengals, due in part to Graham and Simmons work with the kicker, the Bengals made the playoffs for the first time in 15 years. In 2014, Bengals punter Kevin Huber was named to the Pro Bowl. Huber was the second punter and third special teamer overall to make the Pro Bowl that was coached by Simmons. In 2020, he was promoted to Assistant head coach, in addition to his special teams coordinator role. In 2021, Bengals rookie kicker Evan McPherson led the NFL in 50-plus yard field goals made with 9. McPherson would also make a game-winning field goal in overtime to lead the Bengals to Super Bowl LVI, the team's first Super Bowl appearance in 33 years, and the first of Simmons coaching career. The Bengals would lose the game 20–23.

== Personal life ==
Simmons is married with one daughter and two sons.

His uncle, Jerry Simmons, was an NFL strength and conditioning coach for 23 seasons. They worked together at the Baltimore Ravens in 1998 and the Carolina Panthers from 1999 to 2002.
