= 1995 Holiday Bowl =

1995 Plymouth Holiday Bowl
Kansas State Wildcats	Colorado State Rams
(9-2)	(8-3)
Big Eight	WAC
54	21
Head coach: Bill Snyder	Head coach: Sonny Lubick
AP / Coaches / BA; 10 / 10 / 10
	1	2	3	4	Total
Kansas State	7	19	21	7	54
Colorado State	7	0	14	0	21
- Date: December 29, 1995
- Season: 1995
- Stadium: Jack Murphy Stadium
- Location: San Diego, California
- MVP: Offensive: Brian Kavanagh and Mario Smith
- Referee: John Soffey (Big East)
- Halftime show: Marching bands & NCA cheer team
- Attendance: 51,051
- Payout: US$1,360,528 per team

United States TV coverage
- Network: ESPN
- Announcers: Brad Nessler, Gary Danielson, and Adrian Karsten

The 1995 Holiday Bowl was a college football bowl game played December 29, 1995, in San Diego, California. It was part of the 1995 NCAA Division I-A football season. It featured the Kansas State Wildcats, and the Colorado State Rams.

== Game summary ==
Kansas State scored first following a 3-yard touchdown run by running back Eric Hickson, putting the Wildcats up 7–0. Colorado State answered with a 2-yard touchdown run by Jamie Blake tying the game at 7.

In the second quarter, running back Mike Lawrence scored on a 5-yard touchdown run, giving Kansas State a 13–7 lead. Dederick Kelly scored on an 18-yard touchdown run, but the ensuing two-point try missed, leaving the score 19–7. Quarterback Brian Kavanagh threw a 12-yard touchdown pass to wide receiver Brian Lojka to increase the lead to 26–7 at halftime.

Kavanagh added an 18-yard touchdown pass to Tyson Schwieger giving the Wildcats a 33–7 lead. Colorado State scored following a 3-yard touchdown run from E. J. Watson, pulling Kansas State to 33–14. Mike Lawrence answered with his second touchdown run of the game, a 6-yarder, to increase K State's lead to 40–14. Gordon Washington of Colorado State scored on a 12-yard touchdown run making it 40–21.

Kavanagh threw his third passing touchdown on the day in the third quarter, a 4-yard strike to Kevin Lockett, increasing Kansas State's lead to 47–21. Kavanagh added his fourth touchdown pass of the game, when he threw a 33-yard pass to Mitch Running for a 54–21 win.
