= 1995 Kansas Jayhawks football team =

American college football season

1995 Kansas Jayhawks football

Aloha Bowl champion

Aloha Bowl, W 51–30 vs. UCLA
- Conference: Big Eight Conference

Ranking
- Coaches: No. 10
- AP: No. 9
- Record: 10–2 (5–2 Big 8)
- Head coach: Glen Mason (8th season)
- Offensive coordinator: Pat Ruel (8th season)
- Defensive coordinator: Mike Hankwitz (1st season)
- Home stadium: Memorial Stadium

1995 Big Eight Conference football standings
	Conf.					Overall
Team	W		L		T	W		L		T
No. 1 Nebraska $	7	–	0	–	0	12	–	0	–	0
No. 5 Colorado	5	–	2	–	0	10	–	2	–	0
No. 7 Kansas State	5	–	2	–	0	10	–	2	–	0
No. 9 Kansas	5	–	2	–	0	10	–	2	–	0
Oklahoma	2	–	5	–	0	5	–	5	–	1
Oklahoma State	2	–	5	–	0	4	–	8	–	0
Missouri	1	–	6	–	0	3	–	8	–	0
Iowa State	1	–	6	–	0	3	–	8	–	0
$ – Bowl Alliance representative as champion; Rankings from AP Poll

The 1995 Kansas Jayhawks football team represented the University of Kansas as a member of the Big Eight Conference during the 1995 NCAA Division I-A football season. Led by eighth-year head coach Glen Mason, the Jayhawks compiled an overall record of 10–2 with a mark of 5–2 in conference play, placing in a three-way tie for second in the Big 8. Kansas was invited to the Aloha Bowl, where they beat UCLA. The team played home games at Memorial Stadium in Lawrence, Kansas.

1996 was Jayhawks' final season in the Big 8, which dissolved at the end of the 1995–96 academic year. Kansas and the other seven schools in the Big 8 became charter members of the Big 12 Conference in 1996.

== Schedule ==
Date	Time	Opponent	Rank	Site	TV	Result	Attendance
September 2	1:00 p.m.	Cincinnati*		Memorial Stadium; Lawrence, KS		W 23–18	26,500
September 9	1:30 p.m.	at North Texas*		Texas Stadium; Irving, TX		W 27–10	20,211
September 14	7:00 p.m.	TCU*		Memorial Stadium; Lawrence, KS	ESPN	W 38–20	34,000
September 23	1:00 p.m.	Houston*		Memorial Stadium; Lawrence, KS		W 20–13	37,500
October 7	1:00 p.m.	at No. 4 Colorado	No. 24	Folsom Field; Boulder, CO	PSN	W 40–24	52,330
October 14	1:00 p.m.	Iowa State^{†}	No. 10	Memorial Stadium; Lawrence, KS		W 34–7	43,000
October 21	6:30 p.m.	at No. 15 Oklahoma	No. 7	Oklahoma Memorial Stadium; Norman, OK	ESPN	W 38–17	74,639
October 28	1:10 p.m.	at No. 14 Kansas State	No. 6	KSU Stadium; Manhattan, KS (Sunflower Showdown)	PSN	L 7–41	44,284
November 4	1:00 p.m.	Missouri	No. 11	Memorial Stadium; Lawrence, KS (Border War)		W 42–23	46,300
November 11	2:30 p.m.	No. 1 Nebraska	No. 10	Memorial Stadium; Lawrence, KS (rivalry)	ABC	L 3–41	50,300
November 18	2:00 p.m.	at Oklahoma State	No. 15	Lewis Field; Stillwater, OK		W 22–17	36,600
December 25	2:30 p.m.	vs. UCLA*	No. 11	Aloha Stadium; Halawa, HI (Aloha Bowl)	ABC	W 51–30	41,112
*Non-conference game; ^{†}Homecoming; Rankings from AP Poll released prior to the game; All times are in Central time

== Rankings ==
Ranking movements Legend: ██ Increase in ranking ██ Decrease in ranking — = Not ranked
	Week																
Poll	Pre	1	2	3	4	5	6	7	8	9	10	11	12	13	14	15	Final
AP	—	—	—	—	—	25	24	10	7	6	11	10	15	11	11	11	9
Coaches	—	—	—	—	—	22	19	9	7	6	14	12	17	14	14	13	10

== Game summaries ==
=== At Colorado ===
Kansas at Colorado

Team	1	2	3	4	Total
• No. 24 Jayhawks	9	14	3	14	40
No. 4 Buffaloes	14	3	7	0	24

- Date: October 7
- Location: Folsom Field, Boulder, Colorado
- Game attendance: 52,330
- Television network: PSN

Scoring summary
1		KU	Jeff McCord 35-yard field goal	KU 3–0
1		KU	Manolito Jones 31-yard blocked punt return (kick failed)	KU 9–0
1		CU	Rae Carruth 58-yard pass from John Hessler (kick)	KU 9–7
1	2:31	CU	Chris Anderson 17-yard pass from John Hessler (kick)	CU 14–9
2	14:31	KU	L.T. Levine 4-yard run (McCord kick)	KU 16–14
2	3:41	CU	Neil Voskeritchian 19-yard field goal	CU 17–16
2	0:23	KU	June Henley 2-yard run (McCord kick)	KU 23–17
3	9:38	CU	Herchell Troutman 23-yard pass from John Hessler (kick)	CU 24–23
3	1:50	KU	Jeff McCord 31-yard field goal	KU 26–24
4	14:24	KU	June Henley 43-yard run (McCord kick)	KU 33–24
4	9:27	KU	Isaac Byrd 7-yard pass from Mark Williams (McCord kick)	KU 40–24

=== Nebraska ===
Nebraska at Kansas

Team	1	2	3	4	Total
• No. 1 Cornhuskers	14	0	14	13	41
No. 10 Jayhawks	0	3	0	0	3

- Date: November 11
- Location: Memorial Stadium, Lawrence, Kansas
- Game start: 2:30 pm CST
- Game attendance: 50,300
- Referee: Steve Usechek
- TV announcers (ABC): Keith Jackson, Tim Brant, and Lynn Swann

Scoring summary
1	9:17	Neb	Jon Vedral fumble recovery in end zone (Kris Brown kick)	Nebraska 7–0
1	1:17	Neb	Tommie Frazier 1-yard run (Brown kick)	Nebraska 14–0
2	11:23	KU	Jeff McCord 19-yard field goal	Nebraska 14–3
3	11:57	Neb	V. Jackson 1-yard pass from Frazier (Brown kick)	Nebraska 21–3
3	4:04	Neb	Lawrence Phillips 6-yard run (Brown kick)	Nebraska 28–3
4	13:46	Neb	Frazier 5-yard run (Brown kick)	Nebraska 35–3
4	6:56	Neb	Mike Fullman 86-yard interception return (kick failed)	Nebraska 41–3

=== At Oklahoma State ===
Kansas at Oklahoma State

Team	1	2	3	4	Total
• No. 15 Jayhawks	7	2	7	6	22
Cowboys	7	0	7	3	17

- Date: November 18
- Location: Lewis Field, Stillwater, Oklahoma
- Game attendance: 36,600

=== Vs. UCLA (Aloha Bowl) ===
UCLA vs. Kansas

Team	1	2	3	4	Total
Bruins	0	0	7	23	30
• No. 11 Jayhawks	7	10	20	14	51

- Date: December 25
- Location: Aloha Stadium, Honolulu, Hawaii
- Game attendance: 41,112
- TV announcers (ABC): Terry Gannon, Tim Brant, and Dean Blevins

== Roster ==
1995 Kansas Jayhawks football team roster
Players
Coaches
Offense

Pos.	#	Name	Class
G	62	Chris Banks	Sr
WR	1	Isaac Byrd	Jr
OT	71	Derrick Chandler	Jr
WR	13	Hosea Friday	Jr
RB	20	June Henley	Jr
OT	54	Rod Jones	Sr
RB	22	L. T. Levine	Sr
TE	89	Jim Moore	Jr
WR	6	Ashaundai Smith	Sr
C	65	Jared Smith	Jr
RB		Eric Vann	So
OT	79	Scott Whittaker	Jr
QB	15	Mark Williams	Sr

Defense

Pos.	#	Name	Class
CB		Dorian Brew	Sr
DT	90	Dan Dercher	Fr
LB	41	Dick Holt	Sr
LB	49	Chris Jones	Jr
DB		Manolito Jones	So
DT	57	Kevin Kopp	Jr
NT	70	Brett McGraw	So
LB	16	Keith Rodgers	Sr
LB	38	Jason Thoren	So

Special teams

Pos.	#	Name	Class
K	36	Jeff McCord	So
P		Darrin Simmons	Sr

Head coach

- Glen Mason

Coordinators/assistant coaches

- Pat Ruel – Offensive coordinator/Offensive Line
- Mike Hankwitz – Defensive coordinator/Linebackers
- Terry Mohajir – Special Teams/Assistant Offensive Line

Legend

- (C) Team captain
- (S) Suspended
- (I) Ineligible
- Injured
- Redshirt

== 1996 NFL draft ==
Player	Position	Round	Pick	NFL team
Dorian Brew	Cornerback	3	79	Miami Dolphins
Rod Jones	Offensive tackle	7	219	Cincinnati Bengals
Chris Banks	Offensive guard	7	226	Denver Broncos
L.T. Levine	Running back	7	235	Denver Broncos
