= 1995 Oklahoma State Cowboys football team =

American college football season

1995 Oklahoma State Cowboys football
- Conference: Big Eight Conference
- Record: 4–8 (2–5 Big 8)
- Head coach: Bob Simmons (1st season)
- Offensive coordinator: Les Miles (1st season)
- Defensive coordinator: Ted Gill (1st season)
- Home stadium: Lewis Field

1995 Big Eight Conference football standings
	Conf.					Overall
Team	W		L		T	W		L		T
No. 1 Nebraska $	7	–	0	–	0	12	–	0	–	0
No. 5 Colorado	5	–	2	–	0	10	–	2	–	0
No. 7 Kansas State	5	–	2	–	0	10	–	2	–	0
No. 9 Kansas	5	–	2	–	0	10	–	2	–	0
Oklahoma	2	–	5	–	0	5	–	5	–	1
Oklahoma State	2	–	5	–	0	4	–	8	–	0
Missouri	1	–	6	–	0	3	–	8	–	0
Iowa State	1	–	6	–	0	3	–	8	–	0
$ – Bowl Alliance representative as champion; Rankings from AP Poll

The 1995 Oklahoma State Cowboys football team represented Oklahoma State University as a member of the Big Eight Conference during the 1995 NCAA Division I-A football season. Led by first-year head coach Bob Simmons, the Cowboys compiled an overall record of 4–8 with a mark of 2–5 in conference play, tying for fifth place in the Big 8. Oklahoma State played home games at Lewis Field in Stillwater, Oklahoma.

== Schedule ==
Date	Time	Opponent	Site	TV	Result	Attendance	Source
August 31	7:00 p.m.	No. 2 Nebraska	Lewis Field; Stillwater, OK	ESPN	L 21–64	42,100	
September 9	6:00 p.m.	at Tulsa*	Skelly Stadium; Tulsa, OK (rivalry)		L 23–24	31,963	
September 16	6:00 p.m.	Southwest Missouri State*	Lewis Field; Stillwater, OK		W 35–7	37,350	
September 23	1:00 p.m.	at Wyoming*	War Memorial Stadium; Laramie, WY	ESPN2	L 25–45	18,289	
September 30	3:00 p.m.	at No. 12 Tennessee*	Neyland Stadium; Knoxville, TN	PPV	L 0–31	95,319	
October 14	2:00 p.m.	No. 8 Kansas State^{†}	Lewis Field; Stillwater, OK		L 17–23	38,000	
October 21	1:00 p.m.	at Missouri	Faurot Field; Columbia, MO		W 30–26	38,111	
October 28	1:00 p.m.	at Iowa State	Cyclone Stadium; Ames, IA		L 14–38	34,281	
November 4	2:00 p.m.	No. 10 Colorado	Lewis Field; Stillwater, OK		L 32–45	30,050	
November 11	1:30 p.m.	at Oklahoma	Oklahoma Memorial Stadium; Norman, OK (Bedlam Series)		W 12–0	75,004	
November 18	2:00 p.m.	No. 15 Kansas	Lewis Field; Stillwater, OK		L 17–22	36,600	
December 2	11:00 p.m.	at Hawaii*	Aloha Stadium; Halawa, HI		W 24–20	32,001	
*Non-conference game; ^{†}Homecoming; Rankings from AP Poll released prior to the game; All times are in Central time

== After the season ==
The 1996 NFL draft was held on April 20–21, 1996. The following Cowboy was selected.

Round	Pick	Player	Position	NFL club
4	108	Jevon Langford	Defensive end	Cincinnati Bengals
