= Jerry Simmons (American football coach) =

American football coach (born 1954)

Profile
- Position: Linebacker

Personal information
- Born: June 15, 1954 (age 72); Elkhart, Kansas, U.S.

Career information
- High school: Elkhart High School (Elkhart, Kansas)
- College: Fort Hays State

Career history
- Fort Hays State (1978) Assistant strength coach & Graduate assistant with linebackers; Fort Hays State (1979) Conditioning coach, Linebackers coach, & Junior varsity head coach; Clemson Tigers (1980) Assistant strength coach; Rice (1981–1982) Strength and conditioning coach; USC (1983–1987) Strength and conditioning coach; New England Patriots (1988–1990) Strength and conditioning coach; Cleveland Browns (1991–1995) Strength and conditioning coach; Baltimore Ravens (1996–1998) Strength and conditioning coach; Carolina Panthers (1999–2010) Strength and conditioning coach

Jerry Wayne Simmons (born June 15, 1954) is an American former football strength and conditioning coach who coached in the NFL for 23 years. His son, Jordon, is currently the Director of Athletic Performance and head football strength and speed coach at Lenoir-Rhyne University.

== Early life ==
He played basketball for Elkhart High School in 1972. Simmons attended Garden City Junior College before attending Fort Hays State. He had 67 stops in his 1976 season and was cited as one of the defensive leaders of the team. He was named Kansas College Athletic Conference player of the week in 1976 and was named defensive player of the week in November 1976 for his efforts at Fort Hayes State. He received a Central States Intercollegiate Conference football team honorable mention award in December 1976. In his senior year at Fort Hays, he was an all-state selection at linebacker as Fort Hays went on to win the conference title.

== Personal life ==
He and his wife Rebecca have 3 children: Joseph; Jennifer, a military veteran and licensed private investigator; and Jordon, the current assistant head coach and head strength and speed coach at Colorado State. His nephew, Darrin, is the current assistant head coach and special teams coordinator for the Cincinnati Bengals, a position he has held for 22 years.

== Coaching career ==
Simmons began his coaching career in 1978 as a graduate assistant at his alma mater, Fort Hays, while he worked on his master's degree in physical education. He would eventually go on to coach in the NFL for 23 years before retiring after the 2010 season.

=== Rice ===
Simmons designed Rice University's first strength and conditioning facility.

=== USC ===
While at USC, Simmons oversaw the operation of the strength and conditioning facility, designed the weight room, and developed a year-round strength and conditioning program for all USC athletes.

=== Olympics ===
At the 1984 Summer Olympics in Los Angeles, Simmons was a strength training site director.
