= Chris Dishman =

American football player (born 1974)

No. 67, 66
- Position: Guard

Personal information
- Born: February 27, 1974 (age 52); Cozad, Nebraska, U.S.
- Listed height: 6 ft 3 in (1.91 m)
- Listed weight: 375 lb (170 kg)

Career information
- High school: Cozad
- College: Nebraska
- NFL draft: 1997: 4th round, 106th overall pick

Career history
- Arizona Cardinals (1997–2003); St. Louis Rams (2004)

Awards and highlights
- 2× National champion (1994, 1995); Second-team All-American (1996); First-team All-Big 12 (1996); First-team All-Big Eight (1995)

Career NFL statistics
- Games played: 98
- Games started: 59
- Fumble recoveries: 3
- Stats at Pro Football Reference

Christopher Michael Dishman (born February 27, 1974) is an American former professional football player who was a guard in the National Football League (NFL). Dishman grew up in Cozad, Nebraska, where he played on the 1991 Class B state champion team. He was also a class B state wrestling runner up. Dishman played college football for the Nebraska Cornhuskers. After college he played eight seasons in the NFL, including seven for the Arizona Cardinals and one for the St. Louis Rams.

Pre-draft measurables
Height	Weight	Arm length	Hand span	40-yard dash	10-yard split	20-yard split	Vertical jump	Broad jump	Bench press
6 ft 2 5/8 in (1.90 m)	328 lb (149 kg)	33 in (0.84 m)	10 1/8 in (0.26 m)	5.52 s	1.87 s	3.18 s	27.0 in (0.69 m)	7 ft 9 in (2.36 m)	22 reps
All values from NFL Combine

He was selected in the fourth round of the 1997 NFL draft.
