= 1995 Kansas State Wildcats football team =

American college football season

1995 Kansas State Wildcats football

Holiday Bowl champion

Holiday Bowl, W 54–21 vs. Colorado State
- Conference: Big Eight Conference

Ranking
- Coaches: No. 6
- AP: No. 7
- Record: 10–2 (5–2 Big 8)
- Head coach: Bill Snyder (7th season)
- Offensive coordinator: Dana Dimel (1st season)
- Offensive scheme: Pro-style
- Co-defensive coordinators: Jim Leavitt (5th season); Bob Stoops (5th season)
- Base defense: 4–3
- Home stadium: KSU Stadium

1995 Big Eight Conference football standings
	Conf.					Overall
Team	W		L		T	W		L		T
No. 1 Nebraska $	7	–	0	–	0	12	–	0	–	0
No. 5 Colorado	5	–	2	–	0	10	–	2	–	0
No. 7 Kansas State	5	–	2	–	0	10	–	2	–	0
No. 9 Kansas	5	–	2	–	0	10	–	2	–	0
Oklahoma	2	–	5	–	0	5	–	5	–	1
Oklahoma State	2	–	5	–	0	4	–	8	–	0
Missouri	1	–	6	–	0	3	–	8	–	0
Iowa State	1	–	6	–	0	3	–	8	–	0
$ – Bowl Alliance representative as champion; Rankings from AP Poll

The 1995 Kansas State Wildcats football team represented Kansas State University as a member of the Big Eight Conference during the 1995 NCAA Division I-A football season. Led by seventh-year head coach Bill Snyder, the Wildcats compiled an overall record of 10–2 with a mark of 5–2 in conference play, placing in a three-way tie for second in the Big 8. Kansas State was invited to the Holiday Bowl, where the Wildcats defeated Colorado State. The team was ranked No. 7 in the final AP poll and No. 7 in the final Coaches Poll. The ten-win season was the first for Kansas State since 1910, and the final top-ten ranking was the first in program history.

The team played home games at KSU Stadium in Manhattan, Kansas.

The Wildcats led NCAA Division I-A teams in total defense, and shut out three opponents for the first time in school history. The team kept Akron, Northern Illinois, and Missouri scoreless. The Wildcats later repeated the feat in 1999 and 2002.

1995 was the final season for the Big 8, as the conference dissolved in 1996. Kansas State and other seven members of the conference joined four schools from Texas to form the Big 12 Conference.

== Schedule ==
Date	Time	Opponent	Rank	Site	TV	Result	Attendance
September 2	6:10 p.m.	Temple*		KSU Stadium; Manhattan, KS		W 34–7	34,927
September 9	6:00 p.m.	at Cincinnati*	No. 21	Nippert Stadium; Cincinnati OH		W 23–21	16,887
September 23	6:10 p.m.	Akron*	No. 19	KSU Stadium; Manhattan, KS		W 67–0	33,145
September 30	1:10 p.m.	Northern Illinois*	No. 16	KSU Stadium; Manhattan, KS		W 44–0	38,527
October 7	1:10 p.m.	Missouri	No. 13	KSU Stadium; Manhattan, KS		W 30–0	37,925
October 14	2:00 p.m.	at Oklahoma State	No. 8	Lewis Field; Stillwater, OK		W 23–17	38,000
October 21	2:30 p.m.	at No. 2 Nebraska	No. 8	Memorial Stadium; Lincoln, NE (rivalry)	ABC	L 25–49	76,072
October 28	1:10 p.m.	No. 6 Kansas	No. 14	KSU Stadium; Manhattan, KS (rivalry)		W 41–7	44,284
November 4	1:10 p.m.	No. 25 Oklahoma^{†}	No. 9	KSU Stadium; Manhattan, KS		W 49–10	40,138
November 11	1:00 p.m.	at Iowa State	No. 7	Cyclone Stadium; Ames, IA (rivalry)		W 49–7	27,356
November 18	2:30 p.m.	No. 9 Colorado	No. 7	KSU Stadium; Manhattan, KS (rivalry)	ABC	L 17–27	42,454
December 29	8:00 p.m.	vs. Colorado State*	No. 10	Jack Murphy Stadium; San Diego, CA (Holiday Bowl)	ESPN	W 54–21	51,051
*Non-conference game; ^{†}Homecoming; Rankings from AP Poll released prior to the game; All times are in Central time

== Rankings ==
Ranking movements Legend: ██ Increase in ranking ██ Decrease in ranking — = Not ranked
	Week																
Poll	Pre	1	2	3	4	5	6	7	8	9	10	11	12	13	14	15	Final
AP	—	—	21	22	19	16	13	8	8	14	9	7	7	10	10	10	7
Coaches	—	—	23	21	19	15	13	8	8	14	8	7	7	10	10	10	6

== Game summaries ==
=== At Nebraska ===
Kansas State at Nebraska

Team	1	2	3	4	Total
Wildcats	6	0	0	19	25
• Cornhuskers	14	21	7	7	49

- Date: October 21
- Location: Memorial Stadium, Lincoln, Nebraska
- Game attendance: 76,072
- Game weather: 58 °F (14 °C), Sunny, Wind NW 5–10 mph (8.0–16.1 km/h)
- Referee: Tom Ahlers
- TV announcers (ABC): Mark Jones, Todd Blackledge, and Dean Blevins

Scoring summary
1	10:29	Neb	Mike Fullman 79-yard punt return (Kris Brown kick)	Neb 7–0
1	7:23	KSU	Kevin Lockett 18-yard pass from Matt Miller (Gramatica kick failed)	Neb 7–6
1	0:02	Neb	Jon Vedral fumble recovery in end zone (Kris Brown kick)	Neb 14–6
2	9:46	Neb	Sheldon Jackson 11-yard pass from Tommie Frazier (Kris Brown kick)	Neb 21–6
2	5:21	Neb	Ahman Green 10-yard pass from Tommie Frazier (Kris Brown kick)	Neb 28–6
2	5:09	Neb	Luther Hardin 2-yard interception return (Kris Brown kick)	Neb 35–6
3	4:31	Neb	Jon Vedral 32-yard pass from Tommie Frazier (Kris Brown kick)	Neb 42–6
4	13:07	KSU	Mitch Running 7-yard pass from Brian Kavanagh (pass failed)	Neb 42–12
4	7:33	KSU	Kevin Lockett 11-yard pass from Brian Kavanagh (Gramatica kick)	Neb 42–19
4	5:59	KSU	Clyde Johnson 6-yard blocked punt return (pass failed)	Neb 42–25
4	3:43	Neb	Ahman Green 13-yard pass from Tommie Frazier (Kris Brown kick)	Neb 49–25

=== Oklahoma ===
Oklahoma at Kansas State

Team	1	2	3	4	Total
No. 25 Sooners	3	7	0	0	10
• No. 9 Wildcats	7	21	7	14	49

- Date: November 4
- Location: KSU Stadium, Manhattan, Kansas
- Game start: 1:30 CST
- Game attendance: 40,138

=== Colorado ===
Colorado at Kansas State

Team	1	2	3	4	Total
• No. 9 Buffaloes	7	3	0	17	27
No. 7 Wildcats	0	3	7	7	17

- Date: November 18
- Location: KSU Stadium, Manhattan, Kansas
- Game start: 2:30 CST
- Game attendance: 42,454

=== Vs. Colorado State (Holiday Bowl) ===
Kansas State at Colorado

Team	1	2	3	4	Total
• No. 10 Wildcats	7	19	21	7	54
Rams	7	0	14	0	21

- Date: December 29
- Location: Jack Murphy, San Diego, California
- Game attendance: 51,051

== Roster ==
1995 Kansas State Wildcats football team roster
Players
Coaches
Offense

Pos.	#	Name	Class
QB	12	Brian Kavanagh	Jr
WR	22	Jimmy Dean	Jr
G	74	Kendyl Jacox	So
OT	71	Scott Heun
RB	24	Eric Hickson	So
C	64	Jason Johnson	Jr
RB	20	Mike Lawrence	So
WR	83	Kevin Lockett	Jr
TE	80	Brian Lojka	Sr
G	78	Jeremy Martin
QB	6	Matt Miller	Sr
OT	63	Chris Oltmanns
WR	89	Mitch Running	Sr
WR	7	Tyson Schwieger	Sr
TE	86	Justin Swift	Fr
OT	58	Todd Weiner	So
OT	76	Ryan Young	Fr

Defense

Pos.	#	Name	Class
CB	2	Chris Canty	So
LB	8	DeShawn Fogle	Jr
LB	9	Percell Gaskins	Sr
LB	50	Travis Ochs	So
LB	42	Mark Simoneau	Fr

Special teams

Pos.	#	Name	Class
P	16	James Garcia	Fr
K	38	Martin Gramatica	So

Head coach

- Bill Snyder

Coordinators/assistant coaches

- Dana Dimel – Offensive Coordinator
- Ron Hudson – Quarterback & passing game coordinator
- Greg Peterson – Wide receivers
- Larry Kramer – Tight ends & offensive line
- Bob Stoops – co-Defensive Coordinator
- Jim Leavitt – co-Defensive Coordinator & linebackers
- Mo Latimore – interior Defensive line
- Mike Stoops – Defensive end
- Mark Mangino – Recruiting Game Coordinator

Legend

- (C) Team captain
- (S) Suspended
- (I) Ineligible
- Injured
- Redshirt
