= 1995 Missouri Tigers football team =

American college football season

1995 Missouri Tigers football
- Conference: Big Eight Conference
- Record: 3–8 (1–6 Big 8)
- Head coach: Larry Smith (2nd season)
- Offensive coordinator: Jerry Berndt (2nd season)
- Defensive coordinator: Moe Ankney (2nd season)
- Home stadium: Faurot Field

1995 Big Eight Conference football standings
	Conf.					Overall
Team	W		L		T	W		L		T
No. 1 Nebraska $	7	–	0	–	0	12	–	0	–	0
No. 5 Colorado	5	–	2	–	0	10	–	2	–	0
No. 7 Kansas State	5	–	2	–	0	10	–	2	–	0
No. 9 Kansas	5	–	2	–	0	10	–	2	–	0
Oklahoma	2	–	5	–	0	5	–	5	–	1
Oklahoma State	2	–	5	–	0	4	–	8	–	0
Missouri	1	–	6	–	0	3	–	8	–	0
Iowa State	1	–	6	–	0	3	–	8	–	0
$ – Bowl Alliance representative as champion; Rankings from AP Poll

The 1995 Missouri Tigers football team represented the University of Missouri as a member of the Big Eight Conference during the 1995 NCAA Division I-A football season. Led by second-year head coach Larry Smith, the Tigers compiled an overall record of 3–8 with a mark of 1–6 in conference play, tying for seventh place in the Big 8. The team played home games at Faurot Field in Columbia, Missouri.

== Schedule ==
Date	Time	Opponent	Site	TV	Result	Attendance
September 2	7:00 pm	North Texas*	Faurot Field; Columbia, MO		W 28–7	47,214
September 9	1:00 pm	Bowling Green*	Faurot Field; Columbia, MO		L 10–17	35,154
September 16	6:30 pm	at Texas Tech*	Jones Stadium; Lubbock, TX		L 14–41	36,242
September 23	1:00 pm	Northeast Louisiana*	Faurot Field; Columbia, MO		W 31–22	38,758
October 7	1:10 pm	at No. 13 Kansas State	KSU Stadium; Manhattan, KS		L 0–30	37,925
October 14	1:00 pm	at No. 2 Nebraska	Memorial Stadium; Lincoln, NE (rivalry)		L 0–57	75,552
October 21	1:00 pm	Oklahoma State	Faurot Field; Columbia, MO		L 26–30	38,111
October 28	1:00 pm	No. 23 Oklahoma	Faurot Field; Columbia, MO (rivalry)		L 9–13	37,614
November 4	1:00 pm	at No. 11 Kansas	Memorial Stadium; Lawrence, KS (Border War)		L 23–42	46,300
November 11	1:00 pm	at No. 9 Colorado	Folsom Field; Boulder, CO	PSN	L 0–21	50,645
November 18	1:00 pm	Iowa State	Faurot Field; Columbia, MO (rivalry)		W 45–31	33,266
*Non-conference game; Rankings from AP Poll released prior to the game; All times are in Central time

== Coaching staff ==
Name	Position	Seasons at Missouri	Alma mater
Larry Smith	Head coach	2	Bowling Green (1961)
Jerry Berndt	Offensive coordinator & quarterbacks	2	Wisconsin–Superior (1960)
Curtis Jones	Defensive line & tight end	7	Missouri (1968)
Harry Hiestand	Offensive line	2	East Stroudsburg (1980)
Eric Wright	Wide receivers	2	Missouri (1981)
Andy Moeller	Offensive tackle, running back & special teams coordinator	3	Michigan (1986)
Moe Ankney	Defensive coordinator	2	Bowling Green (1963)
Ricky Hunley	Defensive line & linebackers	2	Arizona (1984)
Jon Hoke	Defensive backs	2	Ball State (1980)
Skip Hall	Assistant	3	
