= Jason Peter =

American football player (born 1974)

No. 97
- Position: Defensive end

Personal information
- Born: September 13, 1974 (age 52); Locust, New Jersey, U.S.
- Listed height: 6 ft 4 in (1.93 m)
- Listed weight: 295 lb (134 kg)

Career information
- High school: Middletown South (Middletown, New Jersey)
- College: Nebraska
- NFL draft: 1998: 1st round, 14th overall pick

Career history
- Carolina Panthers (1998–2001)

Awards and highlights
- 3× National champion (1994, 1995, 1997); Consensus All-American (1997); 2× First-team All-Big 12 (1996, 1997)

Career NFL statistics
- Total tackles: 88
- Sacks: 7.5
- Fumble recoveries: 1
- Stats at Pro Football Reference

Jason Michael Peter (born September 13, 1974) is an American former professional football player who was a defensive end for four seasons in the National Football League (NFL). Peter was a consensus All-American playing college football for the Nebraska Cornhuskers. He was selected by the Carolina Panthers in the first round of the 1998 NFL draft.

== Early life ==
Peter grew up in the Locust neighborhood of Middletown Township, New Jersey. He played high school football at Middletown High School South in Middletown Township and at Milford Academy in Milford, CT.

== College career ==
Peter attended the University of Nebraska and played for the Nebraska Cornhuskers football team from 1994 to 1997. As a senior in 1997, he was recognized as a consensus first-team All-American.

=== College statistics ===
Season	Class	GP	Tackles					Interceptions					Fumbles			
Season	Class	GP	Cmb	Solo	Ast	TfL	Sck	Int	Yds	Lng	TD	PD	FF	FR	Yds	TD
1994	Fr	7	8	2	6	1	0	0	0	0	0	2	0	0	0	0
1995	So	12	33	11	22	5	0	0	0	0	0	1	1	0	0	0
1996	Jr	13	61	19	42	11.5	4.5	0	0	0	0	3	1	1	31	1
1997	Sr	13	67	28	39	15	7	0	0	0	0	4	2	0	0	0
Career		45	169	60	109	31.5	11.5	0	0	0	0	10	4	1	31	1

== Professional career ==
Pre-draft measurables
Height	Weight	Arm length	Hand span
6 ft 5 in (1.96 m)	274 lb (124 kg)	33 1/4 in (0.84 m)	10 1/8 in (0.26 m)

The Carolina Panthers selected Peter in the first round (fourteenth pick overall) of the 1998 NFL draft, and he played for the Panthers from 1998 to 2001. His career was shortened by a recurring and chronic neck stinger that forced him to retire after the 2001 season.

== Post-playing career ==
After ending his professional playing career, Peter was a defensive line coach at Edison High School in Huntington Beach, California, and then defensive line coach at Harvard-Westlake School in North Hollywood, California.

Peter was the co-host of The Spread, a local sports talk radio show on ESPN 1480 in Lincoln, Nebraska. He co-hosted the show with Jeff Wilkerson. The show was canceled in November 2009 when the station changed formats. He was also the co-host of a morning radio on 1620 the zone in Omaha, Nebraska, called "Sharp and Peter in the Morning", which aired from 7:00 AM to 11:00 AM Monday thru Friday.

Peter's book, Hero of the Underground: My Journey Down To Heroin & Back was published by St. Martin's Press. The memoir chronicles Peter's addiction to heroin and cocaine, along with pain relievers and alcohol.

== Personal life ==
Peter is the middle child of three sons and one daughter. His younger brother, Damian, signed a letter of intent to play football for the University of Notre Dame but never played a down due to a swimming pool accident, which he came out of nearly paralyzed. Peter's older brother, Christian Peter, also played in the NFL.
