= 1996 Cotton Bowl Classic =

1996 Southwestern Bell Cotton Bowl Classic
- 60th Cotton Bowl Classic
Oregon Ducks	Colorado Buffaloes
(9–3)	(10–2)
Pac-10	Big 8
6	38
Head coach: Mike Bellotti	Head coach: Rick Neuheisel
AP / Coaches / BA; 12 / 12 / 12	AP / Coaches / BA; 7 / 7 / 7
	1	2	3	4	Total
Oregon	6	0	0	0	6
Colorado	0	13	19	6	38
- Date: January 1, 1996
- Season: 1995
- Stadium: Cotton Bowl
- Location: Dallas, Texas
- MVP: RB Herchell Troutman (Colorado); DB Marcus Washington (Colorado)
- Referee: Mike Pereira (WAC)
- Attendance: 58,214

United States TV coverage
- Network: CBS
- Announcers: Tim Ryan and Steve Davis

The Cotton Bowl in Dallas, Texas, hosted the Cotton Bowl Classic.

The 1996 Southwestern Bell Cotton Bowl Classic was a college football bowl game that took place on January 1, 1996, at the Cotton Bowl in Dallas, Texas. It was the 60th edition of the game and a part of the 1995 NCAA Division I-A football season. The game featured the Colorado Buffaloes from the Big Eight and the Oregon Ducks from the Pacific-10 Conference. The game was televised on CBS.

== Game summary ==
Colorado led 13–6 at halftime, and subsequently scored 25 unanswered points in the second half while holding Oregon scoreless.
