= 1995 Nebraska Cornhuskers football team =

American college football season

1995 Nebraska Cornhuskers football

Consensus national champion Big Eight champion Fiesta Bowl champion

Fiesta Bowl (BA NCG), W 62–24 vs. Florida
- Conference: Big Eight Conference

Ranking
- Coaches: No. 1
- AP: No. 1
- Record: 12–0 (7–0 Big 8)
- Head coach: Tom Osborne (23rd season)
- Offensive scheme: I formation
- Defensive coordinator: Charlie McBride (15th season)
- Base defense: 4–3
- Home stadium: Memorial Stadium

1995 Big Eight Conference football standings
	Conf.					Overall
Team	W		L		T	W		L		T
No. 1 Nebraska $	7	–	0	–	0	12	–	0	–	0
No. 5 Colorado	5	–	2	–	0	10	–	2	–	0
No. 7 Kansas State	5	–	2	–	0	10	–	2	–	0
No. 9 Kansas	5	–	2	–	0	10	–	2	–	0
Oklahoma	2	–	5	–	0	5	–	5	–	1
Oklahoma State	2	–	5	–	0	4	–	8	–	0
Missouri	1	–	6	–	0	3	–	8	–	0
Iowa State	1	–	6	–	0	3	–	8	–	0
$ – Bowl Alliance representative as champion; Rankings from AP Poll

The 1995 Nebraska Cornhuskers football team represented the University of Nebraska–Lincoln and was the national champion of the 1995 NCAA Division I-A football season. The team was coached by Tom Osborne and played their home games in Memorial Stadium in Lincoln, Nebraska. The Cornhuskers scored 638 points (53.2 per game) while only allowing 174 (14.5 per game). Their average margin of victory was 38.7 points, and their lowest margin of victory, against Washington State, was 14 points. The Cornhuskers successfully defended their 1994 national championship by defeating 2nd ranked Florida 62–24 in the Fiesta Bowl, at the time the second largest margin of victory ever between a No. 1 and No. 2 school (behind 1945 Army 48–0 over Notre Dame). The team is regarded by many to be the greatest college football team of all time.

== Before the season ==
Following the success of the 1994 season, in which Tommie Frazier and Brook Berringer led Nebraska to its first national championship in over 20 years, the 1995 team was an improvement in nearly every facet. With a powerful rushing offense and a dominating defense, Nebraska captured its second consecutive national title. The 1995 season was the second of a record-breaking three national championships in four years, as the Cornhuskers won Tom Osborne's third title in 1997.

== Schedule ==
Date	Time	Opponent	Rank	Site	TV	Result	Attendance	Source
August 31	7:00 pm	at Oklahoma State	No. 2	Lewis Field; Stillwater, OK	ESPN	W 64–21	42,100	
September 9	11:00 am	at Michigan State*	No. 2	Spartan Stadium; East Lansing, MI	ABC	W 50–10	73,891	
September 16	1:00 pm	Arizona State*	No. 2	Memorial Stadium; Lincoln, NE		W 77–28	75,418	
September 23	1:00 pm	Pacific (CA)*	No. 2	Memorial Stadium; Lincoln, NE		W 49–7	75,630	
September 30	1:00 pm	Washington State*	No. 2	Memorial Stadium; Lincoln, NE		W 35–21	75,777	
October 14	1:00 pm	Missouri	No. 2	Memorial Stadium; Lincoln, NE (rivalry)		W 57–0	75,552	
October 21	2:30 pm	No. 8 Kansas State^{†}	No. 2	Memorial Stadium; Lincoln, NE (rivalry)	ABC	W 49–25	76,072	
October 28	2:30 pm	at No. 7 Colorado	No. 2	Folsom Field; Boulder, CO (rivalry, College GameDay)	ABC	W 44–21	54,063	
November 4	1:00 pm	Iowa State	No. 1	Memorial Stadium; Lincoln, NE (rivalry)		W 73–14	75,505	
November 11	2:30 pm	at No. 10 Kansas	No. 1	Memorial Stadium; Lawrence, KS (rivalry)	ABC	W 41–3	47,880	
November 24	1:30 pm	Oklahoma	No. 1	Memorial Stadium; Lincoln, NE (rivalry)	ABC	W 37–0	75,662	
January 2, 1996	7:00 pm	vs. No. 2 Florida*	No. 1	Sun Devil Stadium; Tempe, AZ (Fiesta Bowl, College GameDay)	CBS	W 62–24	79,864	
*Non-conference game; ^{†}Homecoming; Rankings from AP Poll released prior to the game; All times are in Central time

== Rankings ==
Ranking movements Legend: ██ Increase in ranking ██ Decrease in ranking ( ) = First-place votes
	Week																
Poll	Pre	1	2	3	4	5	6	7	8	9	10	11	12	13	14	15	Final
AP	2	2	2	2	2	2	2	2	2	2	1	1	1	1	1	1 (50)	1 (62)
Coaches	2		2	2	2	2	2	2	2	2	1	1	1	1	1	1 (55)	1 (62)

== Game summaries ==
=== Oklahoma State ===
Nebraska at Oklahoma State [box score]

Team	1	2	3	4	Total
• Nebraska	6	30	14	14	64
Oklahoma State	0	7	7	7	21

- Date: August 31
- Location: Lewis Field, Stillwater, Oklahoma
- Game attendance: 42,100
- TV announcers (ESPN): Mike Patrick and Mike Gottfried

No. 2 Nebraska started the year with a 64–21 win at Oklahoma State in the season opener for both schools. The Cornhuskers piled up 671 total yards and 513 rushing yards while allowing 282 total yards to the Cowboys. After fumbling on its first possession, Nebraska scored on the next eight. An explosive second quarter saw Nebraska take a 16–0 lead following a 29-yard interception return for a touchdown by reserve weakside linebacker Terrell Farley, a JUCO transfer who went on to become Big 8 Defensive Newcomer of the Year. Oklahoma State, which netted −15 yards on its first three drives, responded by taking advantage of one of the young Husker defense's early mistakes, as a draw play by running back David Thompson on third and 10 went 79 yards to the Husker 2-yard line. After a 2-yard touchdown run by Oklahoma State running back Andre Richardson, Nebraska scored on its next offensive play, an 80-yard touchdown from I-back Lawrence Phillips. Phillips later scored on a 27-yard run in the second quarter as the Huskers took a 36–7 halftime lead. Phillips finished the game with 153 yards on 12 carries. Nebraska quarterback Tommie Frazier made his first regular-season start since the previous September and played sharply, carrying 10 times for 64 yards and a touchdown while also completing 6 of 10 passes for 120 yards and another score. Early in the third quarter, Frazier hit wide receiver Reggie Baul down the sideline for a 76-yard touchdown. Early in the fourth quarter, touted freshman Ahman Green scored his first career touchdown on a 14-yard run. Nebraska had seven players rush for at least 30 yards, including five who rushed for at least 50. The game marked twenty-two straight wins for the Huskers over the Cowboys.

=== Michigan State ===
Nebraska at Michigan State [box score]

Team	1	2	3	4	Total
• Nebraska	10	10	16	14	50
Michigan State	7	0	3	0	10

- Date: September 9
- Location: Spartan Stadium, East Lansing, Michigan
- Game attendance: 73,891

No. 2 Nebraska lost quarterback Tommie Frazier early in the second quarter with a bruised thigh, but still dominated Michigan State in East Lansing. The Cornhuskers outrushed the Spartans 552 to 45 and piled up 666 total yards to the Spartans' 335. Lawrence Phillips led all rushers with 206 yards and four touchdowns (three 1-yard scores and one 50-yard score off a direct snap play) on 22 carries. The Huskers also received strong rushing performances from Clinton Childs (eight carries, 83 yards), Ahman Green (four carries, 74 yards, one touchdown), and Jay Sims (one carry, 80 yards, one touchdown). Backup quarterback Brook Berringer replaced Frazier and completed 6 of 11 passes for 106 yards, including a 51-yard bomb to a diving Reggie Baul. The Nebraska defense recorded three sacks, two fumble recoveries, and one interception.

The game marked Michigan State's worst margin of defeat since a 42–0 loss to Michigan in 1983. It remains the most one-sided defeat in the coaching career of Nick Saban, who was in his first season at East Lansing.

=== Arizona State ===
Arizona State at Nebraska [box score]

Team	1	2	3	4	Total
Arizona State	7	14	7	0	28
• Nebraska	35	28	0	14	77

- Date: September 16
- Location: Memorial Stadium, Lincoln, Nebraska
- Game attendance: 75,418

Nebraska set a school record with 63 first-half points en route to a 77–28 victory over Arizona State. Back-up I-back Clinton Childs, starting in place of the suspended Lawrence Phillips, ran 65 yards for a touchdown on the game's first play from scrimmage. The Huskers gained 508 yards in the first half and finished with 686 for the game – 394 rushing and 292 passing. Arizona State added to the first half offensive fireworks as quarterback Jake Plummer found wide receiver Keith Poole for three touchdown passes. For the game, Nebraska quarterback Tommie Frazier completed 7 of 10 passes for 192 yards and two touchdowns while rushing for 35 yards and two more scores. Childs ran for 143 yards and two touchdowns before leaving the game in the second quarter with a sprained knee. Back-up Husker I-back Ahman Green ran for 111 yards and two touchdowns on 13 carries. Nebraska pulled in the reins on its offense in the second half but managed to get a defensive touchdown when linebacker Terrell Farley returned an interception 21 yards. The game was a source of a minor controversy as Sun Devils coach Bruce Snyder accused Nebraska coach Tom Osborne of running up the score after third-string Husker quarterback Matt Turman threw a 39-yard touchdown pass to wide-open reserve receiver Lance Brown in the game's final moments.

=== Pacific (CA) ===
Pacific at Nebraska [box score]

Team	1	2	3	4	Total
Pacific	0	0	7	0	7
• Nebraska	21	14	14	0	49

- Date: September 23
- Location: Memorial Stadium, Lincoln, Nebraska
- Game attendance: 75,630

Nebraska totaled 731 yards, the fifth-highest total in school history, on its way to a 49–7 win over Pacific. The Husker defense held the Tigers to 197 total yards and forced 11 punts. I-back Damon Benning, starting in place of the injured Clinton Childs, rushed for 173 and three touchdowns on 10 carries before leaving in the third quarter with a sprained ankle. I-back Ahman Green added 112 yards and two touchdowns on 15 carries. In all, seven Huskers rushed for at least 29 yards. Nebraska began substituting in the second quarter and eventually used 102 players. The Huskers had three drives stall inside the Pacific 30-yard line, including one that ended with Kris Brown missing a 30-yard field goal.

=== Washington State ===
Washington State at Nebraska [box score]

Team	1	2	3	4	Total
Washington State	7	0	0	14	21
• Nebraska	0	20	8	7	35

- Date: September 30
- Location: Memorial Stadium, Lincoln, Nebraska
- Game attendance: 75,777

Nebraska overcame an early deficit – in what ultimately proved to be the only time the Huskers would trail during the entire regular season – to beat Washington State 35–21. The Huskers took the opening drive inside the Cougar 10-yard line but fumbled away the scoring threat. Moments later, Cougar tailback Frank Madu ran past a Husker blitz for an 87-yard touchdown. Nebraska fumbled on its next drive as well but took a 20–7 halftime lead with two Tommie Frazier touchdown runs and two Kris Brown field goals. A 35-yard touchdown pass from Frazier to Mark Gilman extended the Husker lead to 35–14 before Washington State quarterback Chad Davis accounted for the final margin with a 30-yard touchdown pass to Shawn Tims. As the game ended, Nebraska's offense, by this point composed of reserves, fumbled the ball away for a third time inside the Washington State 5-yard line. Despite the early touchdown run by Madu and a stout Washington State rush defense that ranked fourth nationally entering the game, the Cornhuskers outrushed the Cougars 428–72. Tommie Frazier rushed for 70 yards and threw for 99, and Nebraska ended the game with 527. Reserve I-back Ahman Green finished the game with 176 yards and a touchdown on 13 carries. Husker sophomore defensive end Grant Wistrom had a breakout game, tallying four tackles for loss to lead the Blackshirt defense.

=== Missouri ===
Missouri at Nebraska [box score]

Team	1	2	3	4	Total
Missouri	0	0	0	0	0
• Nebraska	7	21	22	7	57

- Date: October 14
- Location: Memorial Stadium, Lincoln, Nebraska
- Game attendance: 75,552

Nebraska's Blackshirt defense forced five fumbles and recovered two of them, intercepted two passes, and held Missouri to 122 total yards in the Huskers' first shutout of the season. Missouri managed only 39 rushing yards on 39 carries. Husker linebacker Terrell Farley blocked a punt that led to a Husker safety. Meanwhile, the Husker offense tallied 475 total yards, with quarterback Tommie Frazier rushing for 71 yards and three touchdowns and passing for 133 and two touchdowns. Husker I-back Ahman Green, making his first start, rushed for 90 yards and a touchdown on 15 carries.

=== Kansas State ===
Kansas State at Nebraska [box score]

Team	1	2	3	4	Total
Kansas State	6	0	0	19	25
• Nebraska	14	21	7	7	49

- Date: October 21
- Location: Memorial Stadium, Lincoln, Nebraska
- Game attendance: 76,072

Using a combination of stifling defense, surprising passing, and strong special teams, no. 2 Nebraska jumped out to a 35–6 halftime lead over no. 8 Kansas State en route to a 49–25 victory. Sprung by a block by freshman defensive end Mike Rucker, Husker return man Mike Fullman took a punt back 79 yards in the first quarter to open the scoring. Nebraska later scored on a fumble recovery in the end zone by Jon Vedral, an interception return by backup lineman Luther Hardin, and two touchdown passes by quarterback Tommie Frazier. Frazier threw two more touchdowns in the second half, including a 32-yarder to a wide-open Vedral in the third quarter to give the Huskers a 42–6 lead. After three quarters, Kansas State had minus-4-yards rushing and only 128 total. Nebraska began substituting reserve players shortly thereafter, and the Wildcats rallied to put 19 fourth quarter points and pull within 42–25. Nebraska's starters re-emerged and drove for another touchdown, the final score of the game. Despite the strong fourth quarter, the Wildcats finished with just 256 total yards and minus-19 rushing yards, while the Nebraska defense recorded eight sacks and two interceptions. Frazier was 10 of 16 through the air for 148 yards and four touchdowns. Ahman Green ran for 109 yards on 22 carries and caught two touchdowns.

Kansas State went on to finish second nationally in scoring defense; more than a third of the 145 points that the Wildcats allowed during the regular season were scored by the Huskers.

=== Colorado ===
Nebraska at Colorado [box score]

Team	1	2	3	4	Total
• Nebraska	21	10	3	10	44
Colorado	7	7	7	0	21

- Date: October 28
- Location: Folsom Field, Boulder, Colorado
- Game attendance: 54,063

Nebraska scored on a 57-yard run by I-back Ahman Green on its first play from scrimmage, committed no turnovers or penalties, and never trailed during a 44–21 win at no. 7 Colorado. Quarterback Tommie Frazier threw for a career-high 241 yards on 14 of 23 passing with two touchdowns (a 52-yarder to Clester Johnson in the first quarter and a 7-yarder to Jon Vedral in the second) and ran for 40 yards and a touchdown on 13 carries. Colorado quarterback John Hessler was 21 of 43 for 276 yards but threw two interceptions that led to 10 Husker points, and the Buffaloes were flagged 12 times for 92 yards. After Nebraska took a 31–14 halftime lead, Colorado scored on a 49-yard pass from Hessler to James Kidd on 4th and 2 to pull within 31–21. But the Buffaloes came no closer, as two field goals by Kris Brown and Frazier's touchdown run put the game away. Green finished the game with 97 yards and two touchdowns on 18 carries. One of the game's most memorable plays came when Colorado defensive end Greg Jones hit Frazier in the backfield. Frazier, who famously was not sacked during the entire 1995 season, absorbed the blow and completed a 35-yard pass down the sideline to Ahman Green on a drive that ended in a Husker field goal. On the day, Nebraska outgained the Buffaloes 467 to 382 and outrushed them 226 to 106.

=== Iowa State ===
Iowa State at Nebraska [box score]

Team	1	2	3	4	Total
Iowa State	0	7	0	7	14
• Nebraska	20	18	28	7	73

- Date: November 4
- Location: Memorial Stadium, Lincoln, Nebraska
- Game attendance: 75,505

No. 1 Nebraska scored on its first ten possessions and posted 624 rushing yards (second-most in school history) and 776 total yards (fifth-most in school history) in a 73–14 win over the Cyclones. Freshman I-back Ahman Green led the way with 176 rushing yards and three touchdowns on 12 carries and added a touchdown reception. A 64-yard touchdown run by Green in the third quarter marked the team's sixth one-play touchdown drive of the season. The game marked the return of Lawrence Phillips, who gained 68 yards on 12 carries. Tommie Frazier rushed for 62 yards and two touchdowns on eight carries and threw for 118 yards and two more touchdowns on 10 of 15 passing. Nebraska's defense limited Iowa State to 254 total yards, which included 121 yards on 28 carries by Heisman Trophy candidate Troy Davis. The Blackshirts also recorded two interceptions and forced two fumbles, recovering one.

The 73 points were the most ever scored by Nebraska against Iowa State until the Cornhuskers scored 77 against the Cyclones in 1997.

=== Kansas ===
Nebraska at Kansas [box score]

Team	1	2	3	4	Total
• Nebraska	14	0	14	13	41
Kansas	0	3	0	0	3

- Date: November 11
- Location: Memorial Stadium, Lawrence, Kansas
- Game attendance: 53,300

No. 10 Kansas, unbeaten at home on the season and featuring its best team since it last beat the Cornhuskers in 1968, outplayed Nebraska for much of the first half. By the end of the first half, Kansas had outgained Nebraska 199–110 in yards, had 10 more first downs, and had run 23 more plays. However, Nebraska led 14–3 at intermission after recovering a muffed punt in the end zone for one touchdown and recovering a fumble near the Jayhawks' red zone for another. Kansas repeatedly drove deep into Nebraska territory but committed five turnovers. The Jayhawks' only points came on a field goal after an 86-yard drive stalled at the 2-yard line. Nebraska took over in the second half, and an 86-yard interception return by reserve defensive back Mike Fullman closed the scoring at 41–3. Tommie Frazier led all rushers with 99 yards on 10 carries; Kansas as a team ran for 72 yards on 32 rushing attempts. The Nebraska offense had three uncharacteristic turnovers, the first of which – a fumble by backup quarterback Brook Berringer – snapped a streak of 18 straight quarters without a turnover.

The game marked Nebraska's third win over a top ten team in less than a month, with an average victory margin of 45–16. With the win, Nebraska clinched the final Big 8 football championship, its fifth in a row.

=== Oklahoma ===
Oklahoma at Nebraska [box score]

Team	1	2	3	4	Total
Oklahoma	0	0	0	0	0
• Nebraska	10	3	10	14	37

- Date: November 24
- Location: Memorial Stadium, Lincoln, Nebraska
- Game attendance: 75,662

Nebraska entered favored by more than 30 points, one of the largest point spreads in the history of the series. But the Sooners played tough defensively, as Nebraska failed to score a first-half touchdown on offense for the first time all season. The Huskers nonetheless led 13–0 at halftime, thanks to a pair of field goals by Kris Brown and a 36-yard interception return for a score by linebacker Jamel Williams. A 57-yard fumble return by free safety Tony Veland pushed the score to 20–0 early in the third quarter. Frazier went 12 of 25 for 136 passing yards with one touchdown and one interception; the unspectacular performance likely factored into his finishing second in the Heisman Trophy voting behind Ohio State running back Eddie George. Late in the game, backup quarterback Brook Berringer scrambled to convert a long fourth down; during the same drive, reserve fullback Joel Mackovicka scored the game's final touchdown. The Husker offense finished with 271 rushing yards and 407 total. The Husker defense, meanwhile, limited the Sooners to 241 total yards and forced three turnovers. The game marked Nebraska's first shutout of Oklahoma since 1942. At the time, the game was also the second-largest victory ever by the Huskers over the Sooners (44–6, 1928).

The game stretched the Huskers' conference unbeaten streak to 23 games and completed three straight undefeated regular seasons. Nebraska ended the regular season averaging 52.4 points per game, which set an all-time school record and a modern-era college football record. It was the final conference football game for the Big Eight Conference, whose members would join with four members of the Southwest Conference to form the Big 12 the next season.

=== Florida ===
Florida vs Nebraska [box score]

Team	1	2	3	4	Total
Florida	10	0	8	6	24
• Nebraska	6	29	14	13	62

- Date: January 2
- Location: Sun Devil Stadium, Tempe, Arizona
- Game attendance: 79,864

Entering the 1996 Fiesta Bowl, Nebraska had won 24 consecutive games, but some (including Sports Illustrated in their 12/26/1995 issue) still picked Florida to win the game due to the no. 2 Gators' overwhelming speed on both sides of the ball, even though oddsmakers had made Nebraska a substantial favorite. Florida coach Steve Spurrier's "Fun 'n' Gun" offense, led by future Heisman Trophy winner Danny Wuerffel, provided a stark contrast Tom Osborne's I-form power option.

Nebraska defeated Florida 62–24, marking the largest margin of victory and highest score in a national championship game in history until the Georgia Bulldogs broke this record in 2023. Included among several NCAA bowl records the Huskers set was a rushing total of 524 yards (out of an offensive output of 629 yards). I-back Lawrence Phillips carried 25 times for 165 yards and two touchdowns and caught a 16-yard touchdown. Quarterback Tommie Frazier finished the game with 199 yards on 16 carries. The game also included one of the most famous plays in college football history: a 75-yard touchdown run in the third quarter by Frazier in which he broke no fewer than seven tackles. Florida had won every one of their first 12 games by double digits and the Gator offense averaged over 44 points, 360 passing yards, and 534 yards of total offense per game. The Nebraska defense limited the Gators to 269 yards of offense and −28 rushing yards while registering a safety, seven quarterback sacks, and three interceptions, including one returned 42 yards for a touchdown by Michael Booker. The Huskers' 29 points in the second quarter set a Fiesta Bowl record.

== Legacy ==
Due to their performance against Florida, victories over four teams that finished in the top 10 (by an average score of 49–18), consistent dominance (smallest margin of victory was 14 points, trailed only once all season, rushed for 51 touchdowns and 400 yards per game while allowing only 6 rushing touchdowns all season and 78 rushing yards per game), their record-setting offensive performance, and their statistically impressive defense throughout the season, the 1995 Nebraska Cornhuskers are widely regarded as the greatest and most dominant team in college football history. The team set Division I-A records by averaging 7.0 yards per rushing attempt, allowing zero holding penalties all season, allowing zero quarterback sacks, and allowing five punt returns (for 12 yards) over the entire season. The Cornhuskers average margin of victory was over 38 points, the largest of any Division I-A team since World War II, despite regularly resting starters after halftime. Analysts often make comparisons to other recent highly regarded champions, such as the 2001 Miami Hurricanes and the 2004 USC Trojans. Such comparisons, as noted by the experts themselves, are nearly impossible to make, as rankings vary from evaluation to evaluation. The 1994 and 1995 Nebraska teams, which went a combined 25–0, remain the only undefeated and untied back-to-back national champions since Oklahoma in 1955 and 1956. In 2011, the 1995 Cornhuskers were named by Playboy Magazine as the greatest college football team of the Playboy era (since 1957). Several ESPN analysts such as Paul Finebaum and Mark May have declared 1995 Huskers as the greatest college football team of all time. Nebraska won the final Big Eight Conference football championship in 1995, as the league expanded to form the Big 12 Conference the following season.

== Personnel ==
=== Roster and coaching staff ===
1995 Nebraska Cornhuskers football team roster
Players
Coaches
Offense

Pos.	#	Name	Class
WB	27	Jacques Allen	Sr
OT	70	Eric Anderson	So
RB		Erick Arens	Fr
OL		Matt Baldwin	Fr
SE	7	Reggie Baul	Sr
IB	21	Damon Benning	Jr
QB	18	Brook Berringer	Sr
WB	14	Lance Brown	So
OT	74	Jerry Buettner	Fr
TE	90	Tim Carpenter	So
SE	6	Kenny Cheatham	So
IB	26	Clinton Childs	Sr
QB	9	Monte Christo	So
OL		Jeff Clausen	Fr
FB	49	Josh Cobb	So
OT	75	Chris Dishman	Jr
IB	37	Chad Eicher	So
OL		Korey Evans	Fr
WB		Demond Finister	Fr
QB	15	Tommie Frazier	Sr
RB	17	Brayden Herring	Fr
QB	16	Scott Frost	So
OL		Lonnie Fulton	Fr
OT	72	Ben Gessford	Fr
TE	87	Mark Gilman	Sr
C	54	Aaron Graham	Sr
IB	30	Ahman Green	Fr
TE	82	Trent Gumm	Fr
SE	29	Billy Haafke	So
C		Aaron Havlovic	Fr
QB	10	Ryan Held	So
C	59	Josh Heskew	So
SE	5	Brendan Holbein	Jr
TE	85	Joe Horst	So
G	62	Matt Hoskinson	So
TE	88	Sheldon Jackson	Fr
TE	34	Vershan Jackson	So
OT		Kevin James	Fr
WB	33	Clester Johnson	Sr
OL		Marcus Johnson	Fr
OL		Adam Julch	Fr
FB		Ben Kingston	Fr
SE	89	Jeff (Robert) Lake	So
C	53	Troy Langan	Jr
FB	36	Billy Legate	Fr
G	65	Mike Lesser	So
QB		Gregg List	Fr
QB	1	Frankie London	Fr
FB	22	Jeff Makovicka	Sr
FB	45	Joel Makovicka	Fr
RB		Alex McClymont	Fr
RB		Corey McIntyre	Fr
OT	78	Kory Mikos	Jr
WB	12	Andy Miller	Fr
FB	38	Chris Norris	Sr
OT	63	Brian Nunns	Sr
G	69	Steve Ott	Sr
QB		Jeff Perino	Fr
TE	84	Brent Petersen	Fr
IB	1	Lawrence Phillips	Jr
OT	73	Fred Pollack	So
RB		Steve Raymond	Fr
WB	32	David Reddick	Fr
TE	86	Dorrick Roy	Fr
G	66	Anthony Schmode	Fr
FB	28	Brian Schuster	Jr
C	57	Doug Seaman	So
OL		James Sherman	Fr
IB	31	James Sims	So
RB		Jeff Small	Fr
FB	35	Mike Smith	Jr
OT		Jim Tansey	Fr
G	67	Aaron Taylor	So
OT	77	Adam Treu	Jr
C		Theron Troxel	Fr
OT	76	Kyle Tully	Fr
QB	11	Matt Turman	Jr
IB	24	Todd Uhlir	So
G	71	Mike Van Cleave	So
WB	25	Jon Vedral	Jr
G	68	Steve Volin	Sr
C	51	Matt Vrzal	Jr
G	61	Brandt Wade	Fr
WB	3	Riley Washington	Jr
WB		Jeff Wells	Fr
WB	17	Sean Wieting	So
WB		Shevin Wiggins	So
G	64	Jon Zatechka	So

Defense

Pos.	#	Name	Class
WLB	47	Matt Aden	So
FS	2	Dave Alderman	Jr
DL		Derek Allen	Fr
OLB		Travis Antholz	Fr
SLB	23	Larry Arnold	Jr
FS	14	Dennis Bailey	So
OLB	27	Jason Benes	So
RCB	17	Chad Blahak	Jr
LCB	20	Michael Booker	Jr
LB		Ryan Brauer	Fr
OLB	89	Darren Brummond	Fr
LB		Ben Buettenback	Fr
MLB	46	Doug Colman	Sr
MLB	45	Steve Cook	Fr
LB		Rance Cooley	Fr
FS	12	Tray Crayton	Fr
LB		T.J. DeBates	Fr
DL	48	John DiLiberto	Fr
DL		Brandon Drum	Fr
MLB	41	Phil Ellis	Sr
LB	43	Terrell Farley	Jr
SLB	56	Jay Foreman	So
SLB	40	Russell Froehlich	Fr
RCB	12	Mike Fullman	Jr
OLB	88	Sean Gard	So
OLB	58	Luther Hardin	Sr
ROV	19	Chris Herron	Fr
OLB	44	Jon Hesse	Jr
DT	57	Michael Hoffman	So
WLB	49	Quint Hogrefe	Fr
WLB	38	Matt Hunting	So
LCB	24	Jai Jackson	Fr
LB		Julius Jackson	Fr
DT	96	Jason Jenkins	Sr
LB		Chad Kelsay	Fr
DE		Chad Kobus	Fr
LB		Josh Kohl	Fr
WLB	51	Charlie Leece	Fr
WLB	59	Casey Macken	Fr
DB		Karnell Matthews	Fr
ROV	4	Octavious McFarlin	So
DB		Greg McGraw	Fr
DT		Tom Milius	Fr
OLB	83	Bryce Miller	Jr
ROV	10	Mike Minter	Jr
DT	76	Erik Nelson	Fr
DT	97	Jeff Ogard	Jr
DB		Jason Olnes	Fr
LB		Tony Ortiz	Fr
WLB	52	Aaron Penland	Sr
DT	55	Christian Peter	Sr
DT	95	Jason Peter	So
DB		Jerome Peterson	Fr
DB		Chris Rainey	Fr
ROV	39	Mike Roberts	Jr
OLB	84	Mike Rucker	Fr
DT	74	Scott Saltsman	Jr
ROV		Nick Sassaman	Jr
LCB	37	Darren Schmadeke	Sr
DT		Jason Schwab	Fr
LB		Kareem Sears	Fr
LB		Brian Shaw	Fr
MLB	35	Adam Skoda	Fr
LCB	16	Eric Stokes	Jr
DL		Chris Taylor	Fr
WLB	91	Ryan Terwilliger	Jr
DT	53	Ross Tessendorf	Fr
OLB	92	Travis Toline	Fr
OLB	93	Jared Tomich	Sr
DT	94	Larry Townsend	Jr
FS	9	Tony Veland	Sr
RCB	6	Eric Walther	Fr
DB		Eric Warfield	So
WLB	28	Jamel Williams	Jr
RCB	8	Tyrone Williams	Sr
OLB		Aaron Wills	Fr
DT	99	Jason Wiltz	Fr
OLB	82	Shalis Winder	Jr
OLB	98	Grant Wistrom	So
SLB	34	Ramone Worthy	So
FS		Chad Young	Sr
OLB	80	Brendan Zahl	So

Special teams

Pos.	#	Name	Class
P		Andy Bilanzich	Fr
PK		Kris Brown	Fr
P/PK		Dan Hadenfeldt	Fr
P	19	Jesse Kosch	So
P/PK	30	Bill Lafleur	Fr
P	10	Brian Morro	Fr
P	9	Jeff Nolting	So
PK	13	Ted Retzlaff	So
PK		Tom Royce	Jr

Head coach

- Tom Osborne
  23rd season
  32nd year at Nebraska
  Alma mater: Hastings College

Coordinators/assistant coaches

- Charlie McBride
  15th season as DC/DL coach
  19th year at Nebraska
  Alma mater: Colorado
- Turner Gill
  4th season as QB coach
  4th year at Nebraska
  Alma mater: Nebraska
- Craig Bohl
  1st season as LB coach
  4th year at Nebraska
  Alma mater: Nebraska
- Ron Brown
  9th season as WR/TE coach
  9th year at Nebraska
  Alma mater: Brown
- Dan Young
  13th season as OL/K coach
  13th year at Nebraska
  Alma mater: Reed
- Milt Tenopir
  22nd season as OL coach
  22nd year at Nebraska
  Alma mater: Sterling
- Tony Samuel
  10th season as OLB coach
  10th year at Nebraska
  Alma mater: Nebraska
- George Darlington
  DB coach
  23rd year at Nebraska
  Alma mater: Rutgers
- Frank Solich
  13th season as RB coach
  17th year at Nebraska
  Alma mater: Nebraska
- Boyd Epley
  27th season as S&C coach
  27th year at Nebraska
  Alma mater: Nebraska

Legend

- (C) Team captain
- (S) Suspended
- (I) Ineligible
- Injured
- Redshirt

Roster
Last update: January 17, 2011

=== Depth chart ===
Defense

FS
Tony Veland
Eric Stokes
Eric Warfield

WILL	MIKE	SAM
Terrell Farley	Phil Ellis; Doug Colman	Jay Foreman; Jamel Williams
Ryan Terwilliger	Jon Hesse	Larry Arnold
Aaron Penland	Adam Skoda	Ramone Worthy

ROVER
Mike Minter
Octavious McFarlin
Dave Alderman

CB
Michael Booker
Mike Fullman
Darren Schmadeke

DE	DT	DT	DE
Grant Wistrom	Jason Peter	Christian Peter	Jared Tomich
Chad Kelsay	Scott Saltsman	Jeff Ogard	Luther Hardin
Mike Rucker	Jason Jenkins	Larry Townsend	Travis Toline

CB
Tyrone Williams
Leslie Dennis
Chad Blahak

Offense

WR
Clester Johnson
Jon Vedral
Kenny Cheatham

LT	LG	C	RG	RT
Chris Dishman	Aaron Taylor	Aaron Graham	Steve Ott	Eric Anderson
Kory Mikos	Steve Volin	Matt Vrzal	Jon Zatechka	Adam Treu
Fred Pollack	Matt Hoskinson	Josh Heskew	Mike Van Cleave	Brian Nunns

TE
Mark Gilman
Tim Carpenter
Sheldon Jackson
Vershan Jackson

WR
Reggie Baul
Brandon Holbein
Lance Brown

QB
Tommie Frazier
Brook Berringer
Matt Turman

RB
Lawrence Phillips
Ahman Green
Clinton Childs
Damon Benning
James Sims

FB
Jeff Makovicka
Brian Schuster
Joel Makovicka

Special teams
PK Kris Brown
PK Ted Retzlaff
P Jesse Kosch
P Bill Lafleur

== Awards ==
Award	Name(s)
Sporting News Player of the Year	Tommie Frazier
Johnny Unitas Golden Arm Award	Tommie Frazier
UPI Player-of-the-Year	Tommie Frazier
Maxwell Award	Tommie Frazier
All-America 1st team	Tommie Frazier, Aaron Graham, Jared Tomich
All-America 2nd team	Terrell Farley
All-America 3rd team	Grant Wistrom, Aaron Taylor
All-America honorable mention	Chris Dishman, Ahman Green, Christian Peter
Big 8 Offensive Player of the Year	Tommie Frazier
Big 8 Defensive Newcomer of the Year	Terrell Farley
Big 8 Freshman of the Year	Ahman Green
Big 8 Offensive Newcomer of the Year	Ahman Green
All-Big 8 1st team	Eric Anderson, Chris Dishman, Terrell Farley, Tommie Frazier, Aaron Graham, Ahman Green, Christian Peter, Aaron Taylor, Jared Tomich, Tyrone Williams, Grant Wistrom
All-Big 8 2nd team	Reggie Baul, Mike Minter, Tony Veland
All-Big 8 honorable mention	Kris Brown, Phil Ellis, Brendan Holbein, Clester Johnson, Jeff Makovicka, Jason Peter

== NFL and pro players ==
The following Nebraska players who participated in the 1995 season later moved on to the next level and joined a professional or semi-pro team as draftees or free agents.

Name	Team
Eric Anderson	Amsterdam Admirals
Michael Booker	Atlanta Falcons
Kris Brown	Pittsburgh Steelers
Doug Colman	New York Giants
Chris Dishman	Arizona Cardinals
Jay Foreman	Buffalo Bills
Tommie Frazier	Montreal Alouettes
Scott Frost	New York Jets
Aaron Graham	Arizona Cardinals
Ahman Green	Seattle Seahawks
Jon Hesse	Green Bay Packers
Sheldon Jackson	Buffalo Bills
Vershan Jackson	Kansas City Chiefs
Chad Kelsay	Pittsburgh Steelers
Bill Lafleur	Barcelona Dragons
Joel Makovicka	Arizona Cardinals
Mike Minter	Carolina Panthers
Tony Ortiz	Scottish Claymores
Christian Peter	New York Giants
Jason Peter	Carolina Panthers
Lawrence Phillips	St. Louis Rams
Mike Rucker	Carolina Panthers
Eric Stokes	Seattle Seahawks
Jared Tomich	New Orleans Saints
Larry Townsend	Berlin Thunder
Adam Treu	Oakland Raiders
Tony Veland	Denver Broncos
Eric Warfield	Kansas City Chiefs
Jamel Williams	Washington Redskins
Tyrone Williams	Green Bay Packers
Jason Wiltz	New York Jets
Grant Wistrom	St. Louis Rams
Jon Zatechka	Berlin Thunder
