= 1995 Colorado Buffaloes football team =

American college football season

1995 Colorado Buffaloes football

Cotton Bowl Classic champion

Cotton Bowl Classic, W 38–6 vs. Oregon
- Conference: Big Eight Conference

Ranking
- Coaches: No. 5
- AP: No. 4
- Record: 10–2 (5–2 Big 8)
- Head coach: Rick Neuheisel (1st season)
- Offensive coordinator: Karl Dorrell (1st season)
- Offensive scheme: Multiple
- Defensive coordinator: A. J. Christoff (1st season)
- Base defense: 4–3
- MVPs: Rae Carruth; Kerry Hicks
- Captain: Game captains
- Home stadium: Folsom Field

1995 Big Eight Conference football standings
	Conf.					Overall
Team	W		L		T	W		L		T
No. 1 Nebraska $	7	–	0	–	0	12	–	0	–	0
No. 5 Colorado	5	–	2	–	0	10	–	2	–	0
No. 7 Kansas State	5	–	2	–	0	10	–	2	–	0
No. 9 Kansas	5	–	2	–	0	10	–	2	–	0
Oklahoma	2	–	5	–	0	5	–	5	–	1
Oklahoma State	2	–	5	–	0	4	–	8	–	0
Missouri	1	–	6	–	0	3	–	8	–	0
Iowa State	1	–	6	–	0	3	–	8	–	0
$ – Bowl Alliance representative as champion; Rankings from AP Poll

The 1995 Colorado Buffaloes football team represented the University of Colorado at Boulder as a member of the Big Eight Conference during the 1995 NCAA Division I FBS football season. Led by first-year head coach Rick Neuheisel, the Buffaloes compiled an overall record of 10–2 in a mark of 5–2 in conference play, placing in a three-way tie for second in the Big 8. Colorado was invited to the Cotton Bowl Classic, where the Buffalos defeated Oregon. The team played home games at Folsom Field in Boulder, Colorado.

The Buffaloes offense scored 444 points while the defense allowed 240 points.

== Schedule ==
Date	Time	Opponent	Rank	Site	TV	Result	Attendance
September 2	6:00 pm	at No. 21 Wisconsin*	No. 14	Camp Randall Stadium; Madison, WI	ABC	W 43–7	79,015
September 9	7:45 pm	Colorado State*	No. 10	Folsom Field; Boulder, CO (Rocky Mountain Showdown)	ESPN	W 42–14	52,848
September 16	12:00 pm	Northeast Louisiana*	No. 9	Folsom Field; Boulder, CO	KCNC	W 66–14	49,223
September 23	1:30 pm	No. 3 Texas A&M*	No. 7	Folsom Field; Boulder, CO (College GameDay)	ABC	W 29–21	53,849
September 30	6:45 pm	at No. 10 Oklahoma	No. 4	Oklahoma Memorial Stadium; Norman, OK (College GameDay)	ESPN	W 38–17	75,004
October 7	12:00 pm	No. 24 Kansas	No. 4	Folsom Field; Boulder, CO	PSN	L 24–40	52,330
October 21	11:00 am	at Iowa State	No. 9	Cyclone Stadium; Ames, IA	PSN	W 50–28	34,669
October 28	1:30 pm	No. 2 Nebraska	No. 7	Folsom Field; Boulder, CO (rivalry, College GameDay)	ABC	L 21–44	54,063
November 4	1:00 pm	at Oklahoma State	No. 10	Lewis Field; Stillwater, OK	KTVD	W 45–32	30,050
November 11	12:00 pm	Missouri^{†}	No. 9	Folsom Field; Boulder, CO	PSN	W 21–0	50,645
November 18	1:30 pm	at No. 7 Kansas State	No. 9	KSU Stadium; Manhattan, KS (rivalry)	ABC	W 27–17	42,454
January 1	11:30 am	vs. No. 12 Oregon*	No. 7	Cotton Bowl; Dallas, TX (Cotton Bowl Classic)	CBS	W 38–6	58,214
*Non-conference game; ^{†}Homecoming; Rankings from AP Poll released prior to the game; All times are in Mountain time

== Rankings ==
Ranking movements Legend: ██ Increase in ranking ██ Decrease in ranking — = Not ranked т = Tied with team above or below ( ) = First-place votes
	Week																
Poll	Pre	1	2	3	4	5	6	7	8	9	10	11	12	13	14	15	Final
AP	13	14	10	9	7	4	4 (6)	9	9	7	10	9	9	8	7	7	5
Coaches Poll	13	—	10	10	8	5	6	10	9	7	12	10 т	9	8	7	7	4

== Game summaries ==
=== At No. 10 Oklahoma ===
Colorado at Oklahoma

Team	1	2	3	4	Total
• No. 4 Buffaloes	0	14	14	10	38
No. 10 Sooners	3	14	0	0	17

- Date: September 30
- Location: Oklahoma Memorial Stadium, Norman, Oklahoma
- Game attendance: 75,004
- TV announcers (ESPN): Ron Franklin & Mike Gottfried

Scoring summary
1	6:53	OU	Jerry Alexander 21 yard field goal	OU 3-0
2	11:23	OU	Eric Moore 1 yard run (Jerry Alexander kick)	OU 10-0
2	9:10	COL	Phil Savoy 19 yard pass from John Hessler (Neil Voskeritchian kick)	OU 10-7
2	5:42	OU	JaJuan Penny 20 yard pass from Eric Moore (Jerry Alexander kick)	OU 17-7
2	0:17	COL	Rae Carruth 11 yard pass from John Hessler (Neil Voskeritchian kick)	OU 17-14
3	6:54	COL	Rae Carruth 71 yard pass from John Hessler (Neil Voskeritchian kick)	COL 21-17
3	2:27	COL	Lendon Henry 28 yard pass from John Hessler (Neil Voskeritchian kick)	COL 28-17
4	7:46	COL	Phil Savoy 42 yard pass from John Hessler (Neil Voskeritchian kick)	COL 35-17
4	5:02	COL	Neil Voskeritchian 28 yard field goal	COL 38-17

=== No. 24 Kansas ===
Kansas at Colorado

Team	1	2	3	4	Total
• No. 24 Jayhawks	9	14	3	14	40
No. 4 Buffaloes	14	3	7	0	24

- Date: October 7
- Location: Folsom Field, Boulder, Colorado
- Game attendance: 52,330
- Television network: PSN

Scoring summary
1		KU	Jeff McCord 35-yard field goal	KU 3–0
1		KU	Manolito Jones 31-yard blocked punt return (kick failed)	KU 9–0
1		CU	Rae Carruth 58-yard pass from John Hessler (kick)	KU 9–7
1	2:31	CU	Chris Anderson 17-yard pass from John Hessler (kick)	CU 14–9
2	14:31	KU	L.T. Levine 4-yard run (McCord kick)	KU 16–14
2	3:41	CU	Neil Voskeritchian 19-yard field goal	CU 17–16
2	0:23	KU	June Henley 2-yard run (McCord kick)	KU 23–17
3	9:38	CU	Herchell Troutman 23-yard pass from John Hessler (kick)	CU 24–23
3	1:50	KU	Jeff McCord 31-yard field goal	KU 26–24
4	14:24	KU	June Henley 43-yard run (McCord kick)	KU 33–24
4	9:27	KU	Isaac Byrd 7-yard pass from Mark Williams (McCord kick)	KU 40–24

=== No. 2 Nebraska ===
Nebraska at Colorado

Team	1	2	3	4	Total
• No. 2 Cornhuskers	21	10	3	10	44
No. 7 Buffaloes	7	7	7	0	21

- Date: October 28
- Location: Folsom Field, Boulder, Colorado
- Game attendance: 54,063

=== Vs. No. 12 Oregon (Cotton Bowl) ===
Oregon vs. Colorado

Team	1	2	3	4	Total
No. 12 Ducks	6	0	0	0	6
• No. 7 Buffaloes	0	13	19	6	38

- Date: January 1
- Location: Cotton Bowl, Dallas, Texas
- Game attendance: 58,214
- TV announcers (CBS): Tim Ryan and Steve Davis

== Roster ==
1995 Colorado Buffaloes football team roster
Players
Coaches
Offense

Pos.	#	Name	Class
QB	14	Koy Detmer	Jr
WR	21	Rae Carruth	Jr
G	62	Chris Morgan	Fr
G	63	Heath Irwin	Sr
C	64	Bryan Stoltenberg	Sr
WR	82	Mike McCormick	Jr

Defense

Pos.	#	Name	Class
FS	6	T. J. Cunningham	Sr
LB	16	Matt Russell	Jr
DE	95	Daryl Price	Sr

Special teams

Pos.	#	Name	Class
K	17	Neil Voskeritchian	Sr

Head coach

- Rick Neuheisel

Coordinators/assistant coaches

Legend

- (C) Team captain
- (S) Suspended
- (I) Ineligible
- Injured
- Redshirt

Roster

== Team players drafted into the NFL ==
Player	Position	Round	Pick	NFL club
Heath Irwin	Guard	4	101	New England Patriots
Daryl Price	Defensive end	4	128	San Francisco 49ers
Bryan Stoltenberg	Center	6	192	San Diego Chargers
T. J. Cunningham	Defensive back	6	209	Seattle Seahawks
Kerry Hicks	Defensive tackle	7	234	Carolina Panthers
