= 1995 Aloha Bowl =

American college football game

1995 Jeep Eagle Aloha Bowl
UCLA Bruins	Kansas Jayhawks
(7–4)	(9–2)
30	51
Head coach: Terry Donahue	Head coach: Glen Mason
AP / Coaches / BA; NR / 24 / NR	AP / Coaches / BA; 11 / 13 / 13
	1	2	3	4	Total
UCLA	0	0	7	23	30
Kansas	7	10	20	14	51
- Date: December 25, 1995
- Season: 1995
- Stadium: Aloha Stadium
- Location: Honolulu, Hawaii
- MVP: RB Karim Abdul-Jabbar (UCLA); QB Mark Williams (Kansas)
- Referee: Tom Robinson (WAC)
- Attendance: 41,112

United States TV coverage
- Network: ABC
- Announcers: Terry Gannon, Tim Brant, and Dean Blevins

The 1995 Jeep Eagle Aloha Bowl was a college football bowl game, played as part of the 1995–96 bowl game schedule of the 1995 NCAA Division I-A football season. It was the 11th Aloha Bowl. It was played on December 25, 1995, at Aloha Stadium in Honolulu, Hawaii. The game matched the UCLA Bruins of the Pac-10 Conference against the Kansas Jayhawks of the Big 8 Conference in Terry Donahue's final game as head coach of the Bruins.

== Scoring summary ==
=== First quarter ===
- KU—Jim Moore, nine-yard pass from Mark Williams. Jeff McCord converts.

=== Second quarter ===
- KU—June Henley, 49-yard run. McCord converts.
- KU—McCord, 27-yard field goal.

=== Third quarter ===
- KU—Henley, two-yard run. McCord kick fails.
- UCLA—Brad Melsby, eight-yard pass from Cade McNown. Bjorn Merten converts.
- KU—Isaac Byrd, 77-yard pass from Williams. McCord converts.
- KU—Andre Carter, 27-yard pass from Williams. McCord converts.

=== Fourth quarter ===
- UCLA—Kevin Jordan, eight-yard pass from McNown. Merten converts.
- UCLA—Karim Abdul-Jabbar, five-yard run. Melsby pass from McNown.
- KU—Williams, six-yard run. McCord converts.
- UCLA—Melsby, seven-yard pass from McNown. Abdul-Jabbar run.
- KU—Eric Vann, 67-yard run. McCord converts.

=== Statistics ===
Statistics	UCLA	KU
First downs	21	21
Total offense, plays - yards	83–395	71–548
Rushes-yards (net)	45–286	43–277
Passing yards (net)	136	292
Passes, Comp-Att-Int	38–15–0	28–19–1
