= 1995 NCAA Division I-A football season =

American college football season

1995 NCAA Division I-A season
- Number of teams: 108
- Preseason AP No. 1: Florida State

Postseason
- Bowl games: 18
- Heisman Trophy: Ohio State running back Eddie George

Bowl Alliance Championship
- 1996 Fiesta Bowl
- Site: Sun Devil Stadium, Tempe, Arizona
- Champion(s): Nebraska (AP, Coaches, FWAA)

Division I-A football seasons
- ← 1994 1996 →

The 1995 NCAA Division I-A football season was the first year of the Bowl Alliance.

Tom Osborne led Nebraska to its second straight national title with a victory over Florida in the Fiesta Bowl.

This matchup was only possible because of the new Bowl Alliance. Under the old system, Nebraska would have been tied to the Orange Bowl and Florida to the Sugar Bowl. The Bowl Alliance created a national championship game which would rotate between the Orange, Sugar, and Fiesta Bowls free of conference tie-ins and featuring the No. 1 and No. 2 teams as chosen by the Bowl Alliance Poll. The Pac-10 and Big Ten chose not to participate, keeping their tie-ins with the Rose Bowl.

Nebraska was a football dynasty, playing in its third consecutive national title game, and became the first school to claim back-to-back titles since the 1970s. This was a dominant Nebraska team, averaging 52 points per game and a 39-point average margin of victory, including a 62–24 victory over Florida. This lopsided victory came after Florida was picked by many sportswriters to win the game.

Ohio State almost created a national title controversy, going into its final regular season game against Michigan undefeated and ranked No. 2. Had they finished the season No. 2 the Bowl Alliance would have been unable to pit No. 1 vs. No. 2 as the Big Ten champ was tied to the Rose Bowl. However, Michigan upset Ohio State. Buckeye running back Eddie George still won the Heisman Trophy.

Things were lively in the state of Florida, where the Florida Gators won their third straight SEC championship. Florida State started the season No. 1, but lost an ACC game for the first time ever when Virginia stopped a last-minute drive a few inches from the end zone, knocking them out of the national title race.

However, Northwestern was able to steal the show as the year's Cinderella story. Its only regular season loss came against Miami-OH. Northwestern began the season with an upset of Notre Dame and went on to defeat Michigan and Penn State later in the season. Undefeated in the Big Ten after decades as a doormat, the Wildcats went on to face USC in the Rose Bowl. However, the Wildcats lost to the Trojans in what was a see-saw game until USC pulled away in the fourth quarter.

Miami and Alabama had to sit the post season out, as they were on NCAA probation.

The Southwest Conference played its final game ever, an 18–17 Houston win over Rice. Four of its members would join the Big 8 to form the Big 12; the other four were split between the WAC and the newly formed Conference USA.

The Hall of Fame Bowl, originally played in Birmingham, then moved to Tampa, Florida gained corporate sponsorship, and was now known as the Outback Bowl. The Freedom Bowl was discontinued and the Holiday Bowl absorbed its WAC tie-in.

The first ever Division I-A overtime game was played during the 1995 bowl season, the Las Vegas Bowl between Toledo and Nevada. Overtime would be adopted permanently for all games in 1996. Due to the adoption of overtime, the season-ending 3–3 game between Wisconsin and Illinois on November 25 is the last tied game in Division I-A.

== Rule changes ==
- Overtime was introduced for bowl games only in Division I-A. The system is similar to one used in lower division postseason games; Each team gets one possession at the defense's 25 yard line per overtime period and continues until the tie is broken.
- Unsportsmanlike conduct penalties will be assessed on any player who removes his helmet in the field of play other than due to injury.
- A player who receives two unsportsmanlike conduct penalties in the same game is automatically disqualified.
- Officials were instructed to strictly enforce anti-taunting and anti-showboating rules passed in the 1991 season and amended in the 1993 season.
- The home team is allowed to wear white jerseys if they receive written permission from the visiting school in advance, rescinding the 1983 rule requiring the visitors to wear white. This rule was personally lobbied by new LSU coach Gerry DiNardo, since the Bayou Bengals wore white at home from the late 1950s through 1982. The Southeastern Conference adjusted the rule in 1997 for conference games, when it stated the home team would receive first choice of jersey color, regardless of the visiting team's wishes.

== Conference and program changes ==
One team upgraded from Division I-AA prior to the season. As such, the total number of Division I-A schools increased to 108.

- Pacific decided to drop their football team after the completion of the 1995 season.

School	1994 Conference	1995 Conference
North Texas Mean Green	Southland Conference	I-A Independent

== Regular season ==
=== August–September ===
Florida State was the top-ranked team in the preseason AP Poll, with defending champion Nebraska at No. 2 followed by No. 3 Texas A&M, No. 4 Penn State, and No. 5 Florida.

August 31-September 2: No. 1 Florida State opened their season with a 70–26 blowout of Duke. No. 2 Nebraska was just as dominant, winning 64–21 at Oklahoma State. No. 3 Texas A&M defeated LSU 33–17. No. 4 Penn State had not started their schedule. No. 5 Florida beat Houston 45–21. The top five remained the same in the next poll.

September 9: No. 1 Florida State won 45–26 at Clemson, and No. 2 Nebraska visited Michigan State for a 50–10 victory. No. 3 Texas A&M was idle. No. 4 Penn State struggled against Texas Tech, winning 24–23 on a field goal with four seconds left. No. 5 Florida beat Kentucky 42–7 in Lexington. No. 6 Auburn overwhelmed Chattanooga 76-10 and moved up in the next poll: No. 1 Florida State, No. 2 Nebraska, No. 3 Texas A&M, No. 4 Florida, and No. 5 Auburn.

September 16: No. 1 Florida State and No. 2 Nebraska continued their dominant performances, respectively defeating North Carolina State 77-17 and Arizona State 77–28. No. 3 Texas A&M also piled on the points, beating Tulsa 52–9, and No. 4 Florida showed similar firepower with a 62–37 win over No. 8 Tennessee. In contrast, No. 5 Auburn found themselves in a defensive struggle at LSU, and the Bayou Bengals prevailed 12–6. No. 6 USC beat Houston 45-10 and moved up in the next poll: No. 1 Florida State, No. 2 Nebraska, No. 3 Texas A&M, No. 4 Florida, and No. 5 USC.

September 23: No. 1 Florida State defeated Central Florida 46–14, and No. 2 Nebraska beat Pacific 49–7. No. 3 Texas A&M lost 29–21 at No. 7 Colorado even after Buffaloes quarterback Koy Detmer was sidelined with a torn ACL. No. 4 Florida was idle, and No. 5 USC won 31–10 at No. 25 Arizona. The next poll featured No. 1 Florida State, No. 2 Nebraska, No. 3 Florida, No. 4 Colorado, and No. 5 USC.

September 30: No. 1 Florida State was idle. After winning all their previous games by 40 points or more, No. 2 Nebraska had “only” a two-touchdown margin of victory in their 35–21 defeat of Washington State. No. 3 Florida beat Mississippi 28–10, No. 4 Colorado won 38–17 at No. 10 Oklahoma, No. 5 USC shut out Arizona State 31–0, and No. 7 Ohio State defeated No. 15 Notre Dame 45–26. The next poll featured No. 1 Florida State, No. 2 Nebraska, No. 3 Florida, and No. 4 Colorado, with USC and Ohio State tied at No. 5.

=== October ===
October 7: No. 1 Florida State defeated Miami 41–17. No. 2 Nebraska was idle. No. 3 Florida won 28–10 at No. 21 LSU, but No. 4 Colorado fell 40–24 to No. 24 Kansas. No. 5 Ohio State made a late comeback to beat No. 12 Penn State 28–25, while fellow No. 5 USC was a 26–16 winner at California. The next poll featured No. 1 Florida State, No. 2 Nebraska, No. 3 Florida, No. 4 Ohio State, and No. 5 USC.

October 14: No. 1 Florida State dropped 70 points on an opponent for the third time in six games, winning 72–13 over Wake Forest. No. 2 Nebraska kept up the pace with a 57–0 shutout of Missouri. No. 3 Florida visited No. 7 Auburn and won 49–38. No. 4 Ohio State made another fourth-quarter comeback to ensure a 27–16 win at No. 21 Wisconsin, their fifth ranked opponent in six games. No. 5 USC defeated Washington State 26–14. The top five remained the same in the next poll.

October 21: No. 1 Florida State beat Georgia Tech 42–10, while No. 2 Nebraska defeated No. 8 Kansas State 49–25. No. 3 Florida was idle. No. 4 Ohio State shut out Purdue 28–0, but No. 5 USC fell 38–10 at No. 17 Notre Dame. No. 6 Tennessee was idle but moved up in the next poll: No. 1 Florida State, No. 2 Nebraska, No. 3 Florida, No. 4 Ohio State, and No. 5 Tennessee.

October 28: No. 1 Florida State was idle. No. 2 Nebraska won 44–21 at No. 7 Colorado, No. 3 Florida visited Georgia for a 52–17 victory, No. 4 Ohio State beat No. 25 Iowa 56–35, and No. 5 Tennessee defeated South Carolina 56–21. After two straight blowouts of highly rated opponents, Nebraska moved to the top spot in the next poll: No. 1 Nebraska, No. 2 Florida State, No. 3 Florida, No. 4 Ohio State, and No. 5 Tennessee.

=== November–December ===
November 2–4: No. 1 Nebraska overwhelmed Iowa State 73–14. The biggest upset of the season occurred in Charlottesville, where No. 24 Virginia hosted No. 2 Florida State. The Seminoles had dominated the ACC ever since they joined the league in 1992; in fact, they had not lost a single conference game in their three and a half years of membership. However, the streak came to an end with a 33-28 Cavaliers victory, as Florida State's Warrick Dunn fell just short of a game-winning touchdown as time ran out. No. 3 Florida defeated Northern Illinois 58–20, No. 4 Ohio State won 49–21 at Minnesota, and No. 5 Tennessee shut out Southern Mississippi 42–0. No. 6 Northwestern, a surprise contender for the Big Ten title, beat No. 12 Penn State 21-10 and moved into the top five: No. 1 Nebraska, No. 2 Ohio State, No. 3 Florida, No. 4 Tennessee, and No. 5 Northwestern.

November 11: No. 1 Nebraska visited No. 10 Kansas and won 41–3 to sew up the Big 8 title. No. 2 Ohio State defeated Illinois by the same 41–3 margin. No. 3 Florida won 63–7 at South Carolina to clinch a spot in the SEC Championship Game. No. 4 Tennessee was idle, and No. 5 Northwestern beat Iowa 31–20. The top five remained the same in the next poll.

November 18: No. 1 Nebraska was idle. No. 2 Ohio State won 42–3 over Indiana, and No. 3 Florida defeated Vanderbilt 38–7. No. 4 Tennessee needed a fourth-quarter comeback to edge Kentucky 34–31, while No. 5 Northwestern had an easier time of it with a 23–8 victory at Purdue. The Wildcats moved ahead of the Volunteers in the next poll: No. 1 Nebraska, No. 2 Ohio State, No. 3 Florida, No. 4 Northwestern, and No. 5 Tennessee.

November 24–25: No. 1 Nebraska put an exclamation point on their dominant regular season with a 37–0 shutout of rival Oklahoma. An even bigger rivalry game took place the next day, when No. 2 Ohio State visited No. 18 Michigan. For the second time in three years, the Wolverines spoiled the Buckeyes’ shot at an undefeated season, as 313 rushing yards by Tim Biakabutuka and two second-half interceptions by Charles Woodson led to a 31-23 Michigan win. No. 4 Northwestern, who had finished their regular-season schedule, received the Rose Bowl berth which would have gone to Ohio State if the Buckeyes had defeated their nemeses. Meanwhile, No. 3 Florida beat No. 6 Florida State 35-24 and No. 5 Tennessee won 12–7 over Vanderbilt. The next poll featured No. 1 Nebraska, No. 2 Florida, No. 3 Northwestern, No. 4 Tennessee, and No. 5 Ohio State.

December 2: No. 2 Florida was heavily favored to defeat No. 23 Arkansas in the SEC Championship Game, and the Gators did not disappoint, blowing out the Razorbacks 34–3 to complete an undefeated regular season. The final pre-bowl AP Poll featured No. 1 Nebraska, No. 2 Florida, and No. 3 Northwestern, with Tennessee and Ohio State tied at No. 4.

As the only two undefeated teams in the country, No. 1 Nebraska and No. 2 Florida were the obvious choices for the national championship game, and they would square off in the Fiesta Bowl to decide the title. The Rose Bowl featured its traditional Big Ten/Pac-10 matchup with No. 3 Northwestern and No. 17 USC. Other major bowl pairings included the two teams tied at No. 4 (Tennessee and Ohio State) facing each other in the Citrus Bowl, No. 6 Notre Dame against No. 8 Florida State in the Orange Bowl, No. 7 Colorado meeting No. 12 Oregon in the Cotton Bowl, and No. 9 Texas (champion of the SWC in that conference's last year of existence) versus Big East-winning No. 13 Virginia Tech in the Sugar Bowl.

== Conference standings ==
1995 Atlantic Coast Conference football standings
	Conf.			Overall
Team	W		L	W		L
No. 4 Florida State +	7	–	1	10	–	2
No. 16 Virginia +	7	–	1	9	–	4
Clemson	6	–	2	8	–	4
Georgia Tech	5	–	3	6	–	5
North Carolina	4	–	4	7	–	5
Maryland	4	–	4	6	–	5
NC State	2	–	6	3	–	8
Duke	1	–	7	3	–	8
Wake Forest	0	–	8	1	–	10
+ – Conference co-champions; Rankings from AP Poll

1995 Big East Conference football standings
	Conf.			Overall
Team	W		L	W		L
No. 10 Virginia Tech +	6	–	1	10	–	2
No. 20 Miami (FL) +	6	–	1	8	–	3
No. 19 Syracuse	5	–	2	9	–	3
West Virginia	4	–	3	5	–	6
Boston College	4	–	3	4	–	8
Rutgers	2	–	5	4	–	7
Temple	1	–	6	1	–	10
Pittsburgh	0	–	7	2	–	9
+ – Conference co-champions; Rankings from AP Poll

1995 Big Eight Conference football standings
	Conf.					Overall
Team	W		L		T	W		L		T
No. 1 Nebraska $	7	–	0	–	0	12	–	0	–	0
No. 5 Colorado	5	–	2	–	0	10	–	2	–	0
No. 7 Kansas State	5	–	2	–	0	10	–	2	–	0
No. 9 Kansas	5	–	2	–	0	10	–	2	–	0
Oklahoma	2	–	5	–	0	5	–	5	–	1
Oklahoma State	2	–	5	–	0	4	–	8	–	0
Missouri	1	–	6	–	0	3	–	8	–	0
Iowa State	1	–	6	–	0	3	–	8	–	0
$ – Bowl Alliance representative as champion; Rankings from AP Poll

1995 Big Ten Conference football standings
	Conf.					Overall
Team	W		L		T	W		L		T
No. 8 Northwestern $	8	–	0	–	0	10	–	2	–	0
No. 6 Ohio State	7	–	1	–	0	11	–	2	–	0
No. 13 Penn State	5	–	3	–	0	9	–	3	–	0
No. 17 Michigan	5	–	3	–	0	9	–	4	–	0
Michigan State	4	–	3	–	1	6	–	5	–	1
No. 25 Iowa	4	–	4	–	0	8	–	4	–	0
Illinois	3	–	4	–	1	5	–	5	–	1
Wisconsin	3	–	4	–	1	4	–	5	–	2
Purdue	2	–	5	–	1	4	–	6	–	1
Minnesota	1	–	7	–	0	3	–	8	–	0
Indiana	0	–	8	–	0	2	–	9	–	0
$ – Conference champion; Rankings from AP Poll

1995 Big West Conference football standings
	Conf.					Overall
Team	W		L		T	W		L		T
Nevada $	7	–	0	–	0	9	–	3	–	0
Southwestern Louisiana	4	–	2	–	0	6	–	5	–	0
Utah State	4	–	3	–	0	4	–	7	–	0
Arkansas State	3	–	3	–	0	6	–	5	–	0
Northern Illinois	3	–	3	–	0	3	–	8	–	0
New Mexico State	3	–	4	–	0	4	–	7	–	0
San Jose State	3	–	4	–	0	3	–	8	–	0
Louisiana Tech	2	–	4	–	0	5	–	6	–	0
Pacific (CA)	2	–	4	–	0	3	–	8	–	0
UNLV	1	–	5	–	0	2	–	9	–	0
$ – Conference champion

1995 Mid-American Conference football standings
	Conf.					Overall
Team	W		L		T	W		L		T
No. 24 Toledo $	7	–	0	–	1	11	–	0	–	1
Miami (OH)	6	–	1	–	1	8	–	2	–	1
Ball State	6	–	2	–	0	7	–	4	–	0
Western Michigan	6	–	2	–	0	7	–	4	–	0
Eastern Michigan	5	–	3	–	0	6	–	5	–	0
Bowling Green	3	–	5	–	0	5	–	6	–	0
Central Michigan	2	–	6	–	0	4	–	7	–	0
Akron	2	–	6	–	0	2	–	9	–	0
Ohio	1	–	6	–	1	2	–	8	–	1
Kent State	0	–	7	–	1	1	–	9	–	1
$ – Conference champion; Rankings from AP Poll

1995 Pacific-10 Conference football standings
	Conf.					Overall
Team	W		L		T	W		L		T
No. 12 USC ^ +	6	–	1	–	1	9	–	2	–	1
Washington +	6	–	1	–	1	7	–	4	–	1
No. 18 Oregon	6	–	2	–	0	9	–	3	–	0
Stanford	5	–	3	–	0	7	–	4	–	1
UCLA	4	–	4	–	0	7	–	5	–	0
Arizona	4	–	4	–	0	6	–	5	–	0
Arizona State	4	–	4	–	0	6	–	5	–	0
California	2	–	6	–	0	3	–	8	–	0
Washington State	2	–	6	–	0	3	–	8	–	0
Oregon State	0	–	8	–	0	1	–	10	–	0
+ – Conference co-champions; ^ – Rose Bowl representative per tie-breaking rules based on overall record, due to Washington-USC tie; Rankings from AP Poll

1995 Southeastern Conference football standings
	Conf.					Overall
Team	W		L		T	W		L		T
Eastern Division
No. 2 Florida x$	8	–	0	–	0	12	–	1	–	0
No. 3 Tennessee	7	–	1	–	0	11	–	1	–	0
Georgia	3	–	5	–	0	6	–	6	–	0
South Carolina	2	–	5	–	1	4	–	6	–	1
Kentucky	2	–	6	–	0	4	–	7	–	0
Vanderbilt	1	–	7	–	0	2	–	9	–	0
Western Division
Arkansas x	6	–	2	–	0	8	–	5	–	0
No. 21 Alabama	5	–	3	–	0	8	–	3	–	0
No. 22 Auburn	5	–	3	–	0	8	–	4	–	0
LSU	4	–	3	–	1	7	–	4	–	1
Ole Miss	3	–	5	–	0	6	–	5	–	0
Mississippi State	1	–	7	–	0	3	–	8	–	0
Championship: Florida 34, Arkansas 3
$ – Conference champion; x – Division champion/co-champions; Rankings from AP Poll

1995 Southwest Conference football standings
	Conf.					Overall
Team	W		L		T	W		L		T
No. 14 Texas $	7	–	0	–	0	10	–	2	–	1
No. 15 Texas A&M	5	–	2	–	0	9	–	3	–	0
No. 23 Texas Tech	5	–	2	–	0	9	–	3	–	0
Baylor	5	–	2	–	0	7	–	4	–	0
TCU	3	–	4	–	0	6	–	5	–	0
Houston	2	–	5	–	0	2	–	9	–	0
Rice	1	–	6	–	0	2	–	8	–	1
SMU	0	–	7	–	0	1	–	10	–	0
$ – Conference champion; Rankings from AP Poll

1995 Western Athletic Conference football standings
	Conf.			Overall
Team	W		L	W		L
Colorado State +	6	–	2	8	–	4
BYU +	6	–	2	7	–	4
Utah +	6	–	2	7	–	4
Air Force +	6	–	2	8	–	5
San Diego State	5	–	3	8	–	4
Wyoming	4	–	4	6	–	5
Fresno State	2	–	6	5	–	7
New Mexico	2	–	6	4	–	7
Hawaii	2	–	6	4	–	8
UTEP	1	–	7	2	–	10
+ – Conference co-champions

1995 NCAA Division I-A independents football records
	Conf.			Overall
Team	W	L	T	W		L		T
No. 11 Notre Dame		–		9	–	3	–	0
East Carolina		–		9	–	3	–	0
Louisville		–		7	–	4	–	0
Cincinnati		–		6	–	5	–	0
Southern Miss		–		6	–	5	–	0
Army		–		5	–	5	–	1
Navy		–		5	–	6	–	0
Tulsa		–		4	–	7	–	0
Memphis		–		3	–	8	–	0
Northeast Louisiana		–		2	–	9	–	0
North Texas		–		2	–	9	–	0
Tulane		–		2	–	9	–	0
Rankings from AP Poll

== I-AA team wins over I-A teams ==
Italics denotes I-AA teams.

Date	Visiting team	Home team	Site	Result	Attendance	Ref.
August 31	No. 6 (I-AA) Appalachian State	Wake Forest	Groves Stadium • Winston-Salem, North Carolina	24–22	21,831	
September 9	No. 5 (I-AA) Boise State	Utah State	Romney Stadium • Logan, Utah	38–14	20,909	
October 7	No. 6 (I-AA) Troy State	Northeast Louisiana	Malone Stadium • Monroe, Louisiana	20–10	19,267	
October 14	UAB	North Texas	Fouts Field • Denton, Texas	19–14	16,671	
October 21	No. 19 (I-AA) Northwestern State	Northeast Louisiana	Malone Stadium • Monroe, Louisiana (rivalry)	42–39	16,682	
October 28	UCF	Northeast Louisiana	Malone Stadium • Monroe, Louisiana	34–14	16,808	
November 4	Youngstown State	Akron	Rubber Bowl • Akron, Ohio (Steel Tire)	24–10		
^{#}Rankings from AP Poll released prior to game.

== No. 1 and No. 2 progress ==
WEEKS	No. 1	No. 2	Event	Date
PRE-9	Florida State	Nebraska	Nebraska 44, Colorado 21	Oct 28
10	Nebraska	Florida State	Virginia 33, Florida St. 28	Nov 2
11–13	Nebraska	Ohio State+	Michigan 31, Ohio State 23	Nov 25
14–15	Nebraska	Florida	Nebraska 62, Florida 24	Jan 1

+Ohio State, a Big Ten school, was not part of the Bowl Alliance. Florida was No. 3 during weeks 11 through 13.

== Bowl games ==
- Fiesta Bowl: No. 1 Nebraska 62, No. 2 Florida 24
- Rose Bowl: No. 17 Southern California 41, No. 3 Northwestern 32
- Sugar Bowl: No. 13 Virginia Tech 28, No. 9 Texas 10
- Orange Bowl: No. 8 Florida State 31, No. 6 Notre Dame 26
- Cotton Bowl Classic: No. 7 Colorado 38, No. 12 Oregon 6
- Peach Bowl: No. 18 Virginia 34, Georgia 27
- Florida Citrus Bowl: No. 4 Tennessee 20, No. 4 Ohio State 14
- Outback Bowl: No. 15 Penn State 43, No. 16 Auburn 14
- Carquest Bowl: North Carolina 20, No. 24 Arkansas 10
- Sun Bowl: Iowa 38, No. 20 Washington 18
- Gator Bowl: Syracuse 41, No. 23 Clemson 0
- Alamo Bowl: No. 19 Texas A&M 22, No. 14 Michigan 20
- Copper Bowl: Texas Tech 55, Air Force 41
- Holiday Bowl: No. 10 Kansas State 54, Colorado State 21
- Liberty Bowl: East Carolina 19, Stanford 13
- Aloha Bowl: No. 11 Kansas 51, UCLA 30
- Independence Bowl: LSU 45, Michigan State 26
- Las Vegas Bowl: No. 25 Toledo 40, Nevada 37 (OT)

== Final AP Poll ==
1. Nebraska
2. Florida
3. Tennessee
4. Florida State
5. Colorado
6. Ohio State
7. Kansas State
8. Northwestern
9. Kansas
10. Virginia Tech
11. Notre Dame
12. USC
13. Penn State
14. Texas
15. Texas A&M
16. Virginia
17. Michigan
18. Oregon
19. Syracuse
20. Miami-FL
21. Alabama
22. Auburn
23. Texas Tech
24. Toledo
25. Iowa

== Final Coaches Poll ==
1. Nebraska
2. Tennessee
3. Florida
4. Colorado
5. Florida St.
6. Kansas St.
7. Northwestern
8. Ohio St.
9. Virginia Tech
10. Kansas
11. Southern California
12. Penn St.
13. Notre Dame
14. Texas
15. Texas A&M
16. Syracuse
17. Virginia
18. Oregon
19. Michigan
20. Texas Tech
21. Auburn
22. Iowa
23. East Carolina
24. Toledo
25. LSU

== Heisman Trophy voting ==
The Heisman Trophy is given to the year's most outstanding player

Player	School	Position	1st	2nd	3rd	Total
Eddie George	Ohio State	RB	268	248	160	1,460
Tommie Frazier	Nebraska	QB	218	192	158	1,196
Danny Wuerffel	Florida	QB	185	128	128	987
Darnell Autry	Northwestern	RB	87	78	118	535
Troy Davis	Iowa State	RB	41	80	119	402
Peyton Manning	Tennessee	QB	10	21	37	109
Keyshawn Johnson	USC	WR	9	10	12	59
Tim Biakabutuka	Michigan	RB	1	11	6	31
Warrick Dunn	Florida State	RB	2	3	17	29
Bobby Hoying	Ohio State	QB	0	9	10	28

== Other major awards ==
- Maxwell Award (College Player of the Year) - Eddie George, Ohio State
- Walter Camp Award (Back) - Eddie George, Ohio State
- Davey O'Brien Award (Quarterback) - Danny Wuerffel, Florida
- Johnny Unitas Golden Arm Award (Senior Quarterback) - Tommie Frazier, Nebraska
- Doak Walker Award (Running Back) - Eddie George, Ohio State
- Fred Biletnikoff Award (Wide Receiver) - Terry Glenn, Ohio State
- Bronko Nagurski Trophy (Defensive Player) - Pat Fitzgerald, Northwestern
- Dick Butkus Award (Linebacker) - Kevin Hardy, Illinois
- Lombardi Award (Lineman or Linebacker) - Orlando Pace, Ohio State
- Outland Trophy (Interior Lineman) - Jonathan Ogden, OT, UCLA
- Jim Thorpe Award (Defensive Back) - Greg Meyers, Colorado State
- Lou Groza Award (Placekicker) - Michael Reeder, TCU
- Paul "Bear" Bryant Award - Gary Barnett, Northwestern

== Statistical leaders ==
=== Rushing ===
The following players were the individual leaders in rushing during the 1995 NCA Division I-A season:

Rank	Player	Team	Games	Rushes	Yds	Avg	TD	Yds/ game
1	Troy Davis	Iowa State	11	345	2010	5.8	15	182.7
2	Wasean Tait	Toledo	11	357	1905	5.3	20	173.2
3	George Jones	San Diego State	12	305	1842	6.0	23	153.5
4	Eddie George	Ohio State	12	303	1826	6.0	23	152.2
5	Tshimanga Biakabutuka	Michigan	12	279	1724	6.2	12	143.7
6	Darnell Autry	Northwestern	11	355	1675	4.7	14	152.3
7	Deland McCullough	Miami (OH)	11	321	1627	5.1	14	147.9
8	Moe Williams	Kentucky	11	294	1600	5.4	17	145.5
9	Charles Talley	Northern Illinois	11	285	1540	5.4	7	140.0
10	David Thompson	Oklahoma State	12	256	1509	5.9	8	125.8
11	Abu Wilson	Utah State	11	275	1476	5.4	15	134.2
12	Jay Graham	Tennessee	11	272	1438	5.3	12	130.7
13	Mike Alstott	Purdue	11	243	1436	5.9	11	130.5
14	Karim Abdul-Jabbar	UCLA	11	270	1419	5.3	11	129.0
15	Tiki Barber	Virginia	12	265	1397	5.3	14	116.4
16	Madre Hill	Arkansas	12	307	1387	4.5	15	115.6
17	Byron Hanspard	Texas Tech	11	248	1374	5.5	11	124.9
18	Toraino Singleton	UTEP	12	268	1358	5.1	8	113.2
19	Sedrick Shaw	Iowa	11	295	1342	4.5	14	122.0
20	Joe Abdullah	Pacific	11	263	1334	5.1	11	121.3

== Attendances ==
Average home attendance top 3:

Rank	Team	Average
1	Michigan Wolverines	103,767
2	Tennessee Volunteers	94,694
3	Penn State Nittany Lions	93,591
