= 1995 Iowa State Cyclones football team =

American college football season

1995 Iowa State Cyclones football
- Conference: Big Eight Conference
- Record: 3–8 (1–6 Big 8)
- Head coach: Dan McCarney (1st season)
- Offensive coordinator: Steve Loney (1st season)
- Offensive scheme: Pro set
- Defensive coordinator: Larry Coyer (1st season)
- Base defense: 4–3
- Home stadium: Cyclone Stadium

1995 Big Eight Conference football standings
	Conf.					Overall
Team	W		L		T	W		L		T
No. 1 Nebraska $	7	–	0	–	0	12	–	0	–	0
No. 5 Colorado	5	–	2	–	0	10	–	2	–	0
No. 7 Kansas State	5	–	2	–	0	10	–	2	–	0
No. 9 Kansas	5	–	2	–	0	10	–	2	–	0
Oklahoma	2	–	5	–	0	5	–	5	–	1
Oklahoma State	2	–	5	–	0	4	–	8	–	0
Missouri	1	–	6	–	0	3	–	8	–	0
Iowa State	1	–	6	–	0	3	–	8	–	0
$ – Bowl Alliance representative as champion; Rankings from AP Poll

The 1995 Iowa State Cyclones football team represented Iowa State University as a member of the Big Eight Conference during the 1995 NCAA Division I-A football season. Led by first-year head coach Dan McCarney, the Cyclones compiled an overall record of 3–8 with a mark of 1–6 in conference play, tying for seventh place at the bottom of the Big 8 standings. Iowa State played home games at Cyclone Stadium in Ames, Iowa.

== Schedule ==
Date	Time	Opponent	Site	TV	Result	Attendance
August 31	7:00 p.m.	Ohio*	Cyclone Stadium; Ames, IA		W 36–21	32,817
September 9	7:30 p.m.	at TCU*	Amon G. Carter Stadium; Fort Worth, TX		L 10–27	35,185
September 16	11:00 a.m.	Iowa*	Cyclone Stadium; Ames, IA (rivalry)	ABC	L 10–27	49,714
September 23	1:00 p.m.	UNLV*	Cyclone Stadium; Ames, IA		W 57–30	37,619
October 7	1:00 p.m.	No. 14 Oklahoma	Cyclone Stadium; Ames, IA	KWTV	L 26–39	45,731
October 14	1:00 p.m.	at No. 10 Kansas	Memorial Stadium; Lawrence, KS		L 7–34	43,000
October 21	11:00 a.m.	No. 9 Colorado^{†}	Cyclone Stadium; Ames, IA	PSN	L 28–50	34,669
October 28	1:00 p.m.	Oklahoma State	Cyclone Stadium; Ames, IA		W 38–14	34,281
November 4	1:00 p.m.	at No. 1 Nebraska	Memorial Stadium; Lincoln, NE (rivalry)		L 14–73	75,505
November 11	1:00 p.m.	No. 7 Kansas State	Cyclone Stadium; Ames, IA (rivalry)		L 7–49	27,356
November 18	1:00 p.m.	at Missouri	Faurot Field; Columbia, MO (rivalry)		L 31–45	33,266
*Non-conference game; ^{†}Homecoming; Rankings from AP Poll released prior to the game; All times are in Central time

== Roster ==
1995 Iowa State Cyclones football team roster
Players			Coaches
Offense: Pos. / # / Name / Class; RB / / Troy Davis / Jr	Defense: Pos. / # / Name / Class	Special teams: Pos. / # / Name / Class	Head coach: Dan McCarney; Coordinators/assistant coaches Legend: (C) Team captain; (S) Suspended; (I) Ineligible; Injured; Redshirt
