= 1995 Oklahoma Sooners football team =

American college football season

1995 Oklahoma Sooners football
- Conference: Big Eight Conference
- Record: 5–5–1 (2–5 Big 8)
- Head coach: Howard Schnellenberger (1st season)
- Offensive coordinator: Gary Nord (1st season)
- Offensive scheme: Pro-style
- Defensive coordinator: Kurt Van Valkenburgh (1st season)
- Base defense: 4–3
- Captain: Game captains
- Home stadium: Oklahoma Memorial Stadium

1995 Big Eight Conference football standings
	Conf.					Overall
Team	W		L		T	W		L		T
No. 1 Nebraska $	7	–	0	–	0	12	–	0	–	0
No. 5 Colorado	5	–	2	–	0	10	–	2	–	0
No. 7 Kansas State	5	–	2	–	0	10	–	2	–	0
No. 9 Kansas	5	–	2	–	0	10	–	2	–	0
Oklahoma	2	–	5	–	0	5	–	5	–	1
Oklahoma State	2	–	5	–	0	4	–	8	–	0
Missouri	1	–	6	–	0	3	–	8	–	0
Iowa State	1	–	6	–	0	3	–	8	–	0
$ – Bowl Alliance representative as champion; Rankings from AP Poll

The 1995 Oklahoma Sooners football team represented the University of Oklahoma during the 1995 NCAA Division I-A football season. They played their home games at Oklahoma Memorial Stadium and competed as members of the Big Eight Conference. They were coached by Howard Schnellenberger, who was hired away from Louisville to replace Gary Gibbs; this would be Schnellenberger's only year at Oklahoma as he resigned following a 5–5–1 campaign.

== Schedule ==
Date	Time	Opponent	Rank	Site	TV	Result	Attendance
September 9	1:30 p.m.	San Diego State*	No. 14	Oklahoma Memorial Stadium; Norman, OK	PSN	W 38–22	71,119
September 16	1:30 p.m.	SMU*	No. 14	Oklahoma Memorial Stadium; Norman, OK		W 24–10	64,217
September 23	1:30 p.m.	North Texas*	No. 10	Oklahoma Memorial Stadium; Norman, OK		W 51–10	65,829
September 30	7:45 p.m.	No. 4 Colorado	No. 10	Oklahoma Memorial Stadium; Norman, OK (College GameDay)	ESPN	L 17–38	75,004
October 7	1:00 p.m.	at Iowa State	No. 14	Cyclone Stadium; Ames, IA	KWTV	W 39–26	45,731
October 14	2:30 p.m.	vs. No. 18 Texas*	No. 13	Cotton Bowl; Dallas, TX (Red River Shootout)	ABC	T 24–24	75,587
October 21	6:30 p.m.	No. 7 Kansas	No. 15	Oklahoma Memorial Stadium; Norman, OK	ESPN	L 17–38	74,639
October 28	1:00 p.m.	at Missouri	No. 23	Faurot Field; Columbia, MO (rivalry)	KWTV	W 13–9	37,614
November 4	1:10 p.m.	at No. 9 Kansas State	No. 25	KSU Stadium; Manhattan, KS	KWTV	L 10–49	40,138
November 11	1:30 p.m.	Oklahoma State		Oklahoma Memorial Stadium; Norman, OK (Bedlam Series)		L 0–12	75,004
November 24	1:30 p.m.	at No. 1 Nebraska		Memorial Stadium; Lincoln, NE (rivalry)	ABC	L 0–37	75,662
*Non-conference game; Rankings from AP Poll released prior to the game; All times are in Central time

== Rankings ==
Ranking movements Legend: ██ Increase in ranking ██ Decrease in ranking — = Not ranked
	Week																
Poll	Pre	1	2	3	4	5	6	7	8	9	10	11	12	13	14	15	Final
AP	15	16	14	14	10	10	14	13	15	23	25	—	—	—	—	—	—
Coaches	17	—	14	14	11	9	14	12	14	21	25	—	—	—	—	—	—

== Game summaries ==
=== San Diego State ===
San Diego State Aztecs (1–0) at #14 Oklahoma Sooners (0–0)

Quarter	1	2	3	4	Total
San Diego St	0	0	0	22	22
Oklahoma	0	17	14	7	38

at Oklahoma Memorial Stadium, Norman, Oklahoma

- Date: September 19, 1995
- Game attendance: 71,119
- Box Score

=== SMU ===
SMU Mustangs (1–1) at #14 Oklahoma Sooners (1–0)

Quarter	1	2	3	4	Total
SMU	0	3	7	0	10
Oklahoma	3	6	8	7	24

at Oklahoma Memorial Stadium, Norman, Oklahoma

- Date: September 16, 1995
- Game attendance: 64,217
- Box Score

=== North Texas ===
North Texas Mean Green (1–2) at #10 Oklahoma Sooners (2–0)

Quarter	1	2	3	4	Total
North Texas	2	8	0	0	10
Oklahoma	0	17	17	17	51

at Oklahoma Memorial Stadium, Norman, Oklahoma

- Date: September 23, 1995
- Game attendance: 65,829
- Box Score

=== Colorado ===
#4 Colorado Buffaloes (4–0) at #10 Oklahoma Sooners (3–0)

Quarter	1	2	3	4	Total
Colorado	0	14	14	10	38
Oklahoma	3	14	0	0	17

at Oklahoma Memorial Stadium, Norman, Oklahoma

- Date: September 30, 1995
- Game attendance: 75,004
- Box Score

=== At Iowa State ===
#14 Oklahoma Sooners (3–1) at Iowa State Cyclones (2–2)

Quarter	1	2	3	4	Total
Oklahoma	3	13	7	16	39
Iowa St	7	12	0	7	26

at Cyclone Stadium, Ames, Iowa

- Date: October 7, 1995
- Game attendance: 45,731
- Box Score

=== Vs. Texas ===
#13 Oklahoma Sooners (4–1) vs. #18 Texas Longhorns (4–1)

Quarter	1	2	3	4	Total
Oklahoma	0	10	14	0	24
Texas	21	3	0	0	24

at Cotton Bowl, Dallas, Texas

- Date: October 14, 1995
- Game attendance: 75,587
- Box Score

=== Kansas ===
#7 Kansas Jayhawks (6–0) at #15 Oklahoma Sooners (4–1–1)

Quarter	1	2	3	4	Total
Kansas	0	7	10	21	38
Oklahoma	14	0	0	3	17

at Oklahoma Memorial Stadium, Norman, Oklahoma

- Date: October 21, 1995
- Game attendance: 74,639
- Box Score

=== At Missouri ===
#23 Oklahoma Sooners (4–2–1) at Missouri Tigers (2–5)

Quarter	1	2	3	4	Total
Oklahoma	0	7	0	6	13
Missouri	3	3	3	0	9

at Faurot Field, Columbia, Missouri

- Date: October 28, 1995
- Game attendance: 37,614
- Box Score

=== At Kansas State ===
#25 Oklahoma Sooners (5–2–1) at #9 Kansas State Wildcats (7–1)

Quarter	1	2	3	4	Total
Oklahoma	3	7	0	0	10
Kansas St	7	21	7	14	49

at KSU Stadium, Manhattan, Kansas

- Date: November 4, 1995
- Game attendance: 40,138
- Box Score

=== Oklahoma State ===
Oklahoma State Cowboys (2–7) at Oklahoma Sooners (5–3–1)

Quarter	1	2	3	4	Total
Oklahoma St	0	6	0	6	12
Oklahoma	0	0	0	0	0

at Oklahoma Memorial Stadium, Norman, Oklahoma

- Date: November 11, 1995
- Game attendance: 75,004
- Box Score

=== At Nebraska ===
Oklahoma Sooners (5–4–1) at #1 Nebraska Cornhuskers (10–0)

Quarter	1	2	3	4	Total
Oklahoma	0	0	0	0	0
Nebraska	10	3	10	14	37

at Memorial Stadium, Lincoln, Nebraska

- Date: November 24, 1995
- Game attendance: 75,662
- Box Score

== Roster ==
1995 Oklahoma Sooners football team roster
Players
Coaches
Offense

Pos.	#	Name	Class
TE	80	Stephen Alexander	So
RB	25	James Allen	Jr
FB	34	James Arnold	So
QB	2	John Barber	Fr
G	59	Steve Bearden	Fr
WR	24	Chris Blocker	Fr
QB	16	Brad Brittain	Fr
WR	3	Terrence Brown	Jr
G	50	David Bullard	Jr
WR	18	Ronnie Burns	Fr
RB	34	Bennie Butler	Fr
OT	66	Chris Campbell	Jr
G	68	Joe Carollo	Sr
FB	32	Dwayne Chandler	Sr
FB	30	Terry Collier	Sr
G	65	Jason Comer	Sr
OT	78	J. R. Conrad	Sr
QB	14	Buddy Davis	So
FB	30	Jermaine Fazande	Fr
RB	19	Jeff Frazier	Jr
TE	86	Jason Freeman	Fr
QB	12	Justin Fuente	Fr
OT	70	Barry Giles	So
WR	83	Aaron Green	Fr
OT	69	Robert Ingram	So
OL	60	Cornelius Jackson	Fr
WR	2	Jarrail Jackson	Fr
C	54	Clane LaCrosse	Sr
C	75	Chuck Langston	Sr
C	77	Tim Macias	Fr
C	73	Bruce McClure	So
TE	6	Mike McDaniel	Jr
QB	8	Garrick McGee	Sr
OL	52	Russ Meachem	Fr
WR	4	P. J. Mills	Sr
QB	1	Eric Moore	Fr
RB	7	Jerald Moore	So
G	64	Jon Mulac	So
G	67	Derrick Nelson	So
G	74	Milton Overton	Sr
RB	48	De'Mond Parker	Fr
WR	89	JaJuan Penny	Sr
RB	20	Michael Rose	So
FB	29	Keith Sparks	Sr
OT	76	Harry Stamps	Sr
QB	11	Jay Stuckey	Fr
WR	21	Michael Thompson	Jr
LS	61	Taylor Wickersham	So
WR	10	Gerald Williams	Fr

Defense

Pos.	#	Name	Class
DT	95	Brian Ailey	Fr
LB	84	Dale Allen	Fr
DE	72	Robert Allen	Sr
DT	79	Brian Andrews	So
DT	96	Arthur Atkins	Sr
DT	99	Carlos Baker	Fr
CB	31	Larry Bush	Sr
DT	93	Martin Chase	So
S	26	Perry Collier	Sr
DB	41	Anthony Davis	Fr
CB	28	Wendell Davis	Sr
CB	23	Tim Denton	Sr
LB	47	Brent DeQuasie	Sr
DE	90	Aaron Findley	Fr
S	9	Anthony Fogle	Jr
LB	44	Mario Freeman	Sr
LB	53	Marquis Gibson	Fr
DT	97	Kelly Gregg	Fr
DT	59	Rico Harley	Fr
S	17	Rod Henderson	Jr
DB	39	Dennis Hubbard	Fr
LB	43	Corey Ivy	So
DB	42	Darrius Johnson	Sr
DE	57	Cedric Jones	Sr
DB	38	Gana Joseph	Fr
LB	46	Chris Justice	Fr
DT	95	Fred Lewis	Sr
DE	56	Stirling Luckey	Jr
LB	81	Terrance Malone	Fr
DE	58	Marc Manuel	Jr
DE	85	Rod Manuel	Jr
LB	40	Matt McCormick	Fr
DL	94	Greg Moyer
DE	55	Paul Oatts	Jr
LB	45	Tyrell Peters	Jr
DE	91	Mike Phipps	So
LB	27	Collin Rosenberg	Jr
CB	30	Sharod Robinson	So
LB	54	Sebastien Roegiers	Jr
CB	29	David Rowe	Fr
DB	16	Rusty Rushing	Fr
S	21	Steven Rhynes	Fr
LB	51	Broderick Simpson	Jr
DB	48	Darrell Sims	Fr
OT	71	Jay Smith	Fr
LB	36	Travian Smith	So
CB	18	Eric Stacy	Jr
CB	22	Cedric Stephens	Fr
DT	92	Barron Tanner	Jr
LB	35	Ryan Vardeman	Jr
DB	5	Maylon Wesley	Sr
S	13	Terry White	Fr
DB	37	Pee Wee Woods	Fr

Special teams

Pos.	#	Name	Class
K	15	Jeremy Alexander	So
P	88	Tim Daughtry	So
K	87	Jeremy Hernandez	Fr
K	82	Brian Lewis	Fr
K	37	Nick Lynch	So
K	19	Daniel Paho	Sr
K	11	Phil Stamper	So
K	87	Benjamin Young	Fr

Head coach

- Howard Schnellenberger

Coordinators/assistant coaches

- Gary Nord – Offensive coordinator
- Craig Swabek – Running backs
- Clarence James – Wide receivers
- Danny Hope – Offensive line
- Kurt Van Valkenburgh – Defensive coordinator
- Christ Vagotis – Defensive line
- Kenith Pope – Defensive end
- Jon Tenuta – Defensive backs

Legend

- (C) Team captain
- (S) Suspended
- (I) Ineligible
- Injured
- Redshirt

Roster

== NFL draft ==
The following players were selected in the 1996 NFL draft following the season.

Round	Pick	Player	Position	NFL team
1	5	Cedric Jones	Defensive end	New York Giants
3	83	Jerald Moore	Running back	Arizona Cardinals
4	122	Darrius Johnson	Defensive back	Denver Broncos
5	161	Harry Stamps	Tackle	Arizona Cardinals
6	207	Wendell Davis	Defensive back	Dallas Cowboys
7	227	J. R. Conrad	Tackle	New England Patriots
