= 1995–96 NCAA football bowl games =

College football postseason game series

- Season: 1995
- Number of bowls: 18
- Bowl games: December 14, 1995 – January 2, 1996
- National Championship: Fiesta Bowl
- Location of Championship: Sun Devil Stadium; Tempe, Arizona
- Champions: Nebraska
Bowl record by conference
Conference	Bowls	Record	Final AP poll
Big Ten	6	2–4 (0.333)	5
SEC	6	2–4 (0.333)	4
Pac-10	5	1–4 (0.200)	2
Big Eight	4	4–0 (1.000)	4
ACC	4	3–1 (0.750)	2
SWC	3	2–1 (0.667)	3
Big East	2	2–0 (1.000)	3
WAC	2	0–2 (0.000)	0
MAC	1	1–0 (1.000)	1
Big West	1	0–1 (0.000)	0

The 1995–96 NCAA football bowl games concluded the 1995 NCAA Division I-A football season. In the first year of the Bowl Alliance era, the Alliance achieved its goal of matching the two top-ranked teams in the country in the Fiesta Bowl, designated as the Bowl Alliance national championship game for the 1995 season. Top-ranked Nebraska soundly defeated second-ranked Florida 62–24 to repeat as national champions.

A total of 18 bowl games were played from December 14 through January 2 by 36 bowl-eligible teams. This was one fewer than the 19 bowls played in 1993–94 and 1994–95, as the Freedom Bowl dissolved after 1994.

Adopted for this postseason, overtime was used for the first time in Division I-A in the Las Vegas Bowl on December 14.

== Non-Bowl Alliance bowls ==
Date	Time (EST)	TV	Game	Site	Result	Ref.
Dec 14	9:00 PM	ESPN	Las Vegas Bowl	Sam Boyd Stadium; Las Vegas, NV	No. 25 Toledo 40, Nevada 37 (OT)	
Dec 25	3:30 PM	ABC	Aloha Bowl	Aloha Stadium; Honolulu, HI	No. 11 Kansas 51, UCLA 30	
Dec 27	9:00 PM	ESPN	Copper Bowl	Arizona Stadium; Tucson, AZ	Texas Tech 55, Air Force 41	
Dec 28	8:00 PM	ESPN	Alamo Bowl	Alamodome; San Antonio, TX	No. 19 Texas A&M 22, No. 14 Michigan 20	
Dec 29	2:30 PM	CBS	Sun Bowl	Sun Bowl; El Paso, TX	Iowa 38, No. 20 Washington 18	
Dec 29	5:30 PM	ESPN	Independence Bowl	Independence Stadium; Shreveport, LA	LSU 45, Michigan State 26	
Dec 29	9:00 PM	ESPN	Holiday Bowl	Jack Murphy Stadium; San Diego, CA	No. 10 Kansas State 54, Colorado State 21	
Dec 30	12:00 PM	ESPN	Liberty Bowl	Liberty Bowl Memorial Stadium; Memphis, TN	East Carolina 19, Stanford 13	
Dec 30	7:30 PM	TBS	Carquest Bowl	Joe Robbie Stadium; Miami Gardens, FL	North Carolina 20, No. 24 Arkansas 10	
Dec 30	8:00 PM	ESPN	Peach Bowl	Georgia Dome; Atlanta, GA	No. 18 Virginia 34, Georgia 27	
Jan 1	11:00 AM	ESPN	Outback Bowl	Tampa Stadium; Tampa, FL	No. 15 Penn State 43, No. 16 Auburn 14	
Jan 1	1:00 PM	ABC	Florida Citrus Bowl	Florida Citrus Bowl; Orlando, FL	No. 4–T Tennessee 20, No. 4–T Ohio State 14 (Note: Tennessee and Ohio State were tied at fourth in the pre-bowl AP Poll.)	
Jan 1	1:00 PM	NBC	Gator Bowl	Jacksonville Municipal Stadium; Jacksonville, FL	Syracuse 41, No. 23 Clemson 0	
Jan 1	1:30 PM	CBS	Cotton Bowl Classic	Cotton Bowl; Dallas, TX	No. 7 Colorado 38, No. 12 Oregon 6	
Jan 1	5:00 PM	ABC	Rose Bowl	Rose Bowl; Pasadena, CA	No. 17 USC 41, No. 3 Northwestern 32	
Rankings from AP Poll released prior to the game. All times are in Eastern Time.

== Bowl Alliance bowls ==
Date	Time	Game	Site	Result	Ref.
Dec 31	7:30 PM	Sugar Bowl	Louisiana Superdome; New Orleans, LA	No. 13 Virginia Tech 28, No. 9 Texas 10	
Jan 1	8:00 PM	Orange Bowl	Miami Orange Bowl; Miami, FL	No. 8 Florida State 31, No. 6 Notre Dame 26	
Jan 2	8:30 PM	Fiesta Bowl (championship game)	Sun Devil Stadium; Tempe, AZ	No. 1 Nebraska 62, No. 2 Florida 24	
Rankings from AP Poll released prior to the game. All times are in Eastern Time.
