= 1995 Big Ten Conference football season =

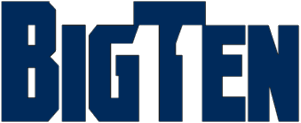
- League: NCAA Division I-A
- Sport: football
- Teams: 11
- Champions: Northwestern

Football seasons

1995 Big Ten Conference football standings
	Conf.					Overall
Team	W		L		T	W		L		T
No. 8 Northwestern $	8	–	0	–	0	10	–	2	–	0
No. 6 Ohio State	7	–	1	–	0	11	–	2	–	0
No. 13 Penn State	5	–	3	–	0	9	–	3	–	0
No. 17 Michigan	5	–	3	–	0	9	–	4	–	0
Michigan State	4	–	3	–	1	6	–	5	–	1
No. 25 Iowa	4	–	4	–	0	8	–	4	–	0
Illinois	3	–	4	–	1	5	–	5	–	1
Wisconsin	3	–	4	–	1	4	–	5	–	2
Purdue	2	–	5	–	1	4	–	6	–	1
Minnesota	1	–	7	–	0	3	–	8	–	0
Indiana	0	–	8	–	0	2	–	9	–	0
$ – Conference champion; Rankings from AP Poll

The 1995 Big Ten Conference football season was the 100th season of college football played by the member schools of the Big Ten Conference and was a part of the 1995 NCAA Division I-A football season. The Big Ten recognized its centennial year with commemorative patches worn on the uniforms of all of its teams.

== Regular season ==
At 8-0 (10-2 overall), Northwestern earned their first Big Ten championship since 1936. The Wildcats also had their first winning season since 1971 and their first 10-win season since 1903. As Big Ten champions, Northwestern represented the conference in the 1996 Rose Bowl, which was their first bowl game appearance since the 1949 Rose Bowl. Northwestern also broke several long-standing losing streaks to regular opponents, including a 22-game losing streak to Iowa, a 19-game losing streak against Michigan, and a 14-game losing streak to Notre Dame.

Ohio State finished in second at 7-1 (11-2 overall) and ended the season ranked No. 6 in the AP Poll.

Penn State and Michigan tied for third with 5-3 marks and wound up ranked No. 13 and No. 17 respectively.

Michigan State finished fifth at 4-3-1 in Big Ten play, with their tie against Purdue putting them just ahead of No. 25 Iowa's 4-4 league record.

Illinois and Wisconsin tied for seventh with 3-4-1 conference records, while Purdue followed in ninth at 2-5-1 (4-6-1 overall).

Minnesota came in tenth at 1-7 (3-8 overall), while Indiana finished last at 0-8 (2-9 overall).

== Bowl games ==
Six Big Ten teams played in bowl games, going 2-4 overall. The conference did not participate in the Bowl Alliance:

- Rose Bowl: No. 17 Southern California 41, No. 3 Northwestern 32
- Florida Citrus Bowl: No. 4 Tennessee 20, No. 4 Ohio State 14
- Outback Bowl: No. 15 Penn State 43, No. 16 Auburn 14
- Sun Bowl: Iowa 38, No. 20 Washington 18
- Alamo Bowl: No. 19 Texas A&M 22, No. 14 Michigan 20
- Independence Bowl: LSU 45, Michigan State 26
