= 1995 California Golden Bears football team =

American college football season

1995 California Golden Bears football
- Conference: Pacific-10 Conference
- Record: 3–8 (2–6 Pac-10)
- Head coach: Keith Gilbertson (4th season)
- Offensive coordinator: Denny Schuler (3rd season)
- Defensive coordinator: Artie Gigantino (4th season)
- Home stadium: California Memorial Stadium

1995 Pacific-10 Conference football standings
	Conf.					Overall
Team	W		L		T	W		L		T
No. 12 USC ^ +	6	–	1	–	1	9	–	2	–	1
Washington +	6	–	1	–	1	7	–	4	–	1
No. 18 Oregon	6	–	2	–	0	9	–	3	–	0
Stanford	5	–	3	–	0	7	–	4	–	1
UCLA	4	–	4	–	0	7	–	5	–	0
Arizona	4	–	4	–	0	6	–	5	–	0
Arizona State	4	–	4	–	0	6	–	5	–	0
California	2	–	6	–	0	3	–	8	–	0
Washington State	2	–	6	–	0	3	–	8	–	0
Oregon State	0	–	8	–	0	1	–	10	–	0
+ – Conference co-champions; ^ – Rose Bowl representative per tie-breaking rules based on overall record, due to Washington-USC tie; Rankings from AP Poll

The 1995 California Golden Bears football team was an American football team that represented the University of California, Berkeley as a member of the Pacific-10 Conference (Pac-10) during the 1995 NCAA Division I-A football season. In their fourth and final year under head coach Keith Gilbertson, the Golden Bears compiled an overall record of 3–8 with a mark of 2–6 against conference opponents, tying for eighth place in the Pac-10, and were outscored by opponents 286 to 243. The team played home games at California Memorial Stadium in Berkeley, California.

The team's statistical leaders included Pat Barnes with 2,685 passing yards, Reynard Rutherford with 868 rushing yards, and Bobby Shaw with 658 receiving yards.

== Schedule ==
Date	Opponent	Site	TV	Result	Attendance	Source
September 2	at San Diego State*	Jack Murphy Stadium; San Diego, CA		L 9–33	32,172	
September 9	Fresno State*	California Memorial Stadium; Berkeley, CA		L 24–25	35,500	
September 23	San Jose State*	California Memorial Stadium; Berkeley, CA		W 40–7		
September 30	at Arizona	Arizona Stadium; Tucson, AZ		L 15–20	44,564	
October 7	No. 5 USC	California Memorial Stadium; Berkeley, CA		L 16–26	49,000	
October 14	No. 15 Oregon	California Memorial Stadium; Berkeley, CA		L 30–52	31,000	
October 21	at Oregon State	Parker Stadium; Corvallis, OR	Prime	W 13–12	26,573	
October 28	at No. 24 UCLA	Rose Bowl; Pasadena, CA (rivalry)		L 16–33	53,614	
November 4	Washington State	California Memorial Stadium; Berkeley, CA		W 27–11	31,000	
November 11	Arizona State	California Memorial Stadium; Berkeley, CA		L 29–38	28,500	
November 18	at Stanford	Stanford Stadium; Stanford, CA (Big Game)		L 24–29	72,893	
*Non-conference game; Rankings from AP Poll released prior to the game
