= 1995 Oregon State Beavers football team =

American college football season

1995 Oregon State Beavers football
- Conference: Pacific-10 Conference
- Record: 1–10 (0–8 Pac-10)
- Head coach: Jerry Pettibone (5th season)
- Offensive coordinator: Mike Summers (5th season)
- Offensive scheme: Multiple
- Defensive coordinator: Rocky Long (5th season)
- Base defense: 3–3–5
- Home stadium: Parker Stadium

1995 Pacific-10 Conference football standings
| | Conf. | | | | | Overall |
| Team | W | | L | | T | W | | L | | T |
|---|---|---|---|---|---|---|---|---|---|---|
| No. 12 USC ^ + | 6 | – | 1 | – | 1 | 9 | – | 2 | – | 1 |
| Washington + | 6 | – | 1 | – | 1 | 7 | – | 4 | – | 1 |
| No. 18 Oregon | 6 | – | 2 | – | 0 | 9 | – | 3 | – | 0 |
| Stanford | 5 | – | 3 | – | 0 | 7 | – | 4 | – | 1 |
| UCLA | 4 | – | 4 | – | 0 | 7 | – | 5 | – | 0 |
| Arizona | 4 | – | 4 | – | 0 | 6 | – | 5 | – | 0 |
| Arizona State | 4 | – | 4 | – | 0 | 6 | – | 5 | – | 0 |
| California | 2 | – | 6 | – | 0 | 3 | – | 8 | – | 0 |
| Washington State | 2 | – | 6 | – | 0 | 3 | – | 8 | – | 0 |
| Oregon State | 0 | – | 8 | – | 0 | 1 | – | 10 | – | 0 |
+ – Conference co-champions; ^ – Rose Bowl representative per tie-breaking rules based on overall record, due to Washington-USC tie; Rankings from AP Poll

The 1995 Oregon State Beavers football team represented Oregon State University as a member of the Pacific-10 Conference (Pac-10) during the 1995 NCAA Division I-A football season. Led by fifth-year head coach Jerry Pettibone, the Beavers compiled an overall record of 1–10 with a mark of 0–8, placing last out of ten teams in the Pac-10. Oregon State played home games at Parker Stadium in Corvallis, Oregon.

== Schedule ==
| Date | Opponent | Site | Result | Attendance | Source |
|---|---|---|---|---|---|
| September 2 | No. 14 (I-AA) Idaho* | Parker Stadium; Corvallis, OR | W 14–7 | 32,024 | |
| September 9 | at Pacific (CA)* | Stagg Memorial Stadium; Stockton, CA | L 10–23 | 10,763 | |
| September 16 | at North Texas* | Fouts Field; Denton, TX | L 27–30 | 18,613 | |
| September 23 | at Arizona State | Sun Devil Stadium; Tempe, AZ | L 11–20 | 41,802 | |
| September 30 | No. 18 Washington | Parker Stadium; Corvallis, OR | L 16–26 | 32,989 | |
| October 7 | at Washington State | Martin Stadium; Pullman, WA | L 14–40 | 31,876 | |
| October 21 | California | Parker Stadium; Corvallis, OR | L 12–13 | 26,573 | |
| October 28 | at Stanford | Stanford Stadium; Stanford, CA | L 3–24 | 30,665 | |
| November 4 | Arizona | Parker Stadium; Corvallis, OR | L 9–14 | 22,913 | |
| November 11 | No. 12 USC | Parker Stadium; Corvallis, OR | L 10–28 | 21,851 | |
| November 18 | No. 16 Oregon | Autzen Stadium; Eugene, OR (Civil War) | L 10–12 | 46,114 | |
*Non-conference game; Rankings from AP Poll released prior to the game
