= 1995 Washington State Cougars football team =

American college football season

1995 Washington State Cougars football
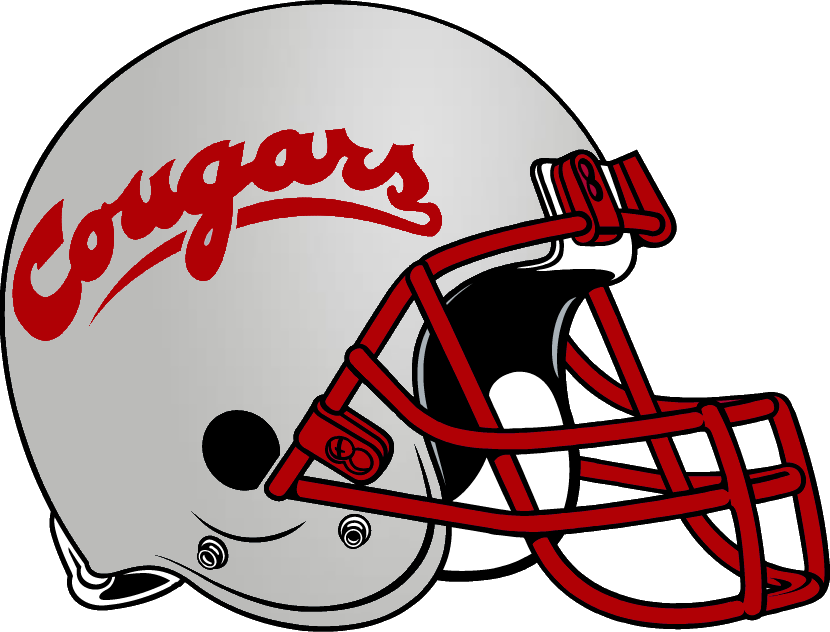
- Conference: Pacific-10 Conference
- Record: 3–8 (2–6 Pac-10)
- Head coach: Mike Price (7th season)
- Offensive coordinator: Jim McDonell (2nd season)
- Offensive scheme: Spread
- Defensive coordinator: Bill Doba (2nd season)
- Base defense: 4–3
- Home stadium: Martin Stadium

1995 Pacific-10 Conference football standings
	Conf.					Overall
Team	W		L		T	W		L		T
No. 12 USC ^ +	6	–	1	–	1	9	–	2	–	1
Washington +	6	–	1	–	1	7	–	4	–	1
No. 18 Oregon	6	–	2	–	0	9	–	3	–	0
Stanford	5	–	3	–	0	7	–	4	–	1
UCLA	4	–	4	–	0	7	–	5	–	0
Arizona	4	–	4	–	0	6	–	5	–	0
Arizona State	4	–	4	–	0	6	–	5	–	0
California	2	–	6	–	0	3	–	8	–	0
Washington State	2	–	6	–	0	3	–	8	–	0
Oregon State	0	–	8	–	0	1	–	10	–	0
+ – Conference co-champions; ^ – Rose Bowl representative per tie-breaking rules based on overall record, due to Washington-USC tie; Rankings from AP Poll

The 1995 Washington State Cougars football team was an American football team that represented Washington State University in the Pacific-10 Conference (Pac-10) during the 1995 NCAA Division I-A football season. In their seventh season under head coach Mike Price, the Cougars compiled a 3–8 record (2–6 in Pac-10, tied for eighth), and were outscored 274 to 236.

The team's statistical leaders included Chad Davis with 1,868 passing yards, Frank Madu with 870 rushing yards, and Eric Moore with 486 receiving yards.

== Schedule ==
Date	Opponent	Site	Result	Attendance
September 2	at Pittsburgh*	Pitt Stadium; Pittsburgh, PA	L 13–17	35,513
September 9	Montana*	Martin Stadium; Pullman, WA	W 38–21	28,312
September 23	No. 16 UCLA	Martin Stadium; Pullman, WA	W 24–15	33,711
September 30	at No. 2 Nebraska*	Memorial Stadium; Lincoln, NE	L 21–35	75,777
October 7	Oregon State^{†}	Martin Stadium; Pullman, WA	W 40–14	31,876
October 14	at No. 5 USC	Los Angeles Memorial Coliseum; Los Angeles, CA	L 14–26	51,131
October 21	at No. 12 Oregon	Autzen Stadium; Eugene, OR	L 7–26	46,109
October 28	Arizona	Martin Stadium; Pullman, WA	L 14–24	32,924
November 4	at California	California Memorial Stadium; Berkeley, CA	L 11–27	31,000
November 11	Stanford	Martin Stadium; Pullman, WA	L 24–36	26,572
November 18	at No. 22 Washington	Husky Stadium; Seattle, WA (Apple Cup)	L 30–33	74,144
*Non-conference game; ^{†}Homecoming; Rankings from AP Poll released prior to the game

== Roster ==
1995 Washington State Cougars football team roster
Players
Coaches
Offense

Pos.	#	Name	Class
WR	17	Chad Carpenter	Jr
QB	12	Chad Davis	Jr
QB	15	Shawn Deeds	Sr
WR	1	Jay Dumas	Sr
QB	16	Ryan Leaf	Fr
RB	4	Frank Madu	Sr
RB		Miguel Meriweather	Fr
C	68	Marc McCloskey	Sr
C	76	Jason McEndoo	So
WR	45	Shawn McWashington	So
TE	89	Eric Moore	Sr
G	72	Scott Sanderson	Jr
OT	79	John Scukanec	Sr
G	71	Cory Solomon	So
RB	5	Derek Sparks	Sr
WR	18	Bryant Thomas	So

Defense

Pos.	#	Name	Class
CB	27	Greg Burns	Sr
LB	33	James Darling	Jr
DE	46	Shane Doyle	So
LB	38	Phillip Glover	So
LB	22	Chris Hayes	Sr
FS	3	Terrell Henderson	Jr
CB	15	Shad Hinchen	Jr
DT	95	Gary Holmes	Fr
DT	97	Darryl Jones	Fr
DT	93	Delmar Morais	Fr
LB	4	Johnny Nansen	Jr
DE	92	Dwayne Sanders	Sr
SS	25	Duane Stewart	So
CB	6	Brian Walker	Sr

Special teams

Pos.	#	Name	Class
P	26	George Martin	Sr
K	47	Tony Truant	Jr

Head coach

- Mike Price (7th year)

Coordinators/assistant coaches

- Jim McDonell – OC
- Bill Doba – DC

Legend

- (C) Team captain
- (S) Suspended
- (I) Ineligible
- Injured
- Redshirt

== NFL draft ==
One Cougar was selected in the 1996 NFL draft.

Player	Position	Round	Overall	Franchise
Chris Hayes	S	7	210	New York Jets
