= 1995 Arizona State Sun Devils football team =

American college football season

1995 Arizona State Sun Devils football
- Conference: Pacific-10 Conference
- Record: 6–5 (4–4 Pac-10)
- Head coach: Bruce Snyder (4th season)
- Offensive coordinator: Dan Cozzetto (4th season)
- Defensive coordinator: Phil Snow (1st season)
- Home stadium: Sun Devil Stadium

1995 Pacific-10 Conference football standings
	Conf.					Overall
Team	W		L		T	W		L		T
No. 12 USC ^ +	6	–	1	–	1	9	–	2	–	1
Washington +	6	–	1	–	1	7	–	4	–	1
No. 18 Oregon	6	–	2	–	0	9	–	3	–	0
Stanford	5	–	3	–	0	7	–	4	–	1
UCLA	4	–	4	–	0	7	–	5	–	0
Arizona	4	–	4	–	0	6	–	5	–	0
Arizona State	4	–	4	–	0	6	–	5	–	0
California	2	–	6	–	0	3	–	8	–	0
Washington State	2	–	6	–	0	3	–	8	–	0
Oregon State	0	–	8	–	0	1	–	10	–	0
+ – Conference co-champions; ^ – Rose Bowl representative per tie-breaking rules based on overall record, due to Washington-USC tie; Rankings from AP Poll

The 1995 Arizona State Sun Devils football team represented Arizona State University as a member of the Pacific-10 Conference (Pac-10) during the 1995 NCAA Division I-A football season. In their fourth season under head coach Bruce Snyder, the Sun Devils compiled an overall record of 6–5 with a mark of 4–4 in conference play, placing in three-way tie for fifth in Pac-10. The team played home games at Sun Devil Stadium in Tempe, Arizona.

== Schedule ==
Date	Time	Opponent	Site	TV	Result	Attendance
September 2	12:30 pm	at No. 22 Washington	Husky Stadium; Seattle, WA	ABC	L 20–23	73,129
September 9	6:00 pm	UTEP*	Sun Devil Stadium; Tempe, AZ		W 45–20	43,089
September 16	11:00 am	at No. 2 Nebraska*	Memorial Stadium; Lincoln, NE		L 28–77	75,418
September 23	6:00 pm	Oregon State	Sun Devil Stadium; Tempe, AZ		W 20–11	41,802
September 30	4:00 pm	at No. 5 USC	Los Angeles Memorial Coliseum; Los Angeles, CA	ABC	L 0–31	52,577
October 7	6:00 pm	at No. 19 Stanford	Stanford Stadium; Stanford, CA		L 28–30	41,625
October 14	7:00 pm	BYU*	Sun Devil Stadium; Tempe, AZ	PSN	W 29–21	51,035
October 28	1:00 pm	at No. 10 Oregon	Autzen Stadium; Eugene, OR		W 35–24	44,772
November 4	4:30 pm	No. 22 UCLA	Sun Devil Stadium; Tempe, AZ	PSN	W 37–33	48,126
November 11	1:30 pm	at California	California Memorial Stadium; Berkeley, CA		W 38–29	28,500
November 24	4:00 pm	Arizona	Sun Devil Stadium; Tempe, AZ (rivalry)	ABC	L 28–31	67,606
*Non-conference game; Rankings from AP Poll released prior to the game; All times are in Mountain time

== Roster ==
1995 Arizona State Sun Devils football team roster
Players
Coaches
Offense

Pos.	#	Name	Class
RB	8	Terry Battle	Jr
TE	82	Steve Bush	Jr
QB	16	Jake Plummer	Jr
WR	3	Keith Poole	Jr
FB	34	Ryan Wood	Sr

Defense

Pos.	#	Name	Class
LB	36	Derek Smith	Jr
DT	99	Shawn Swayda	Jr

Special teams

Pos.	#	Name	Class

Head coach

- Bruce Snyder

Coordinators/assistant coaches

Legend

- (C) Team captain
- (S) Suspended
- (I) Ineligible
- Injured
- Redshirt
