= Darnell Autry =

American football player (born 1976)

No. 21, 24
- Position: Running back

Personal information
- Born: June 19, 1976 (age 50); Wiesbaden, Hesse, Germany
- Listed height: 5 ft 10 in (1.78 m)
- Listed weight: 210 lb (95 kg)

Career information
- High school: Tempe (Tempe, Arizona, U.S.)
- College: Northwestern
- NFL draft: 1997: 4th round, 105th overall pick

Career history
- Chicago Bears (1997); Philadelphia Eagles (1998–2000)

Awards and highlights
- First-team All-American (1996); Second-team All-American (1995); 2× First-team All-Big Ten (1995, 1996)

Career NFL statistics
- Rushing yards: 653
- Rushing average: 2.9
- Rushing touchdowns: 4
- Receptions: 33
- Receiving yards: 334
- Receiving touchdowns: 1
- Stats at Pro Football Reference

Harrington Darnell Autry (born June 19, 1976) is an American former professional football player who was a running back in the National Football League (NFL). He played college football for the Northwestern Wildcats.

== College career ==
In his sophomore season, he helped lead the 1995 Northwestern Wildcats to the Big Ten Conference championship and the 1996 Rose Bowl. Autry finished fourth in the Heisman Trophy balloting for 1995 and appeared on the cover of Sports Illustrated after a Northwestern victory over Penn State. He finished seventh in the 1996 Heisman Trophy balloting.

In his junior season, he led Northwestern to another share of the Big Ten championship. After the season, Autry sued the NCAA to be allowed to act in a movie since he was a theater major and he did not want to lose NCAA eligibility. The NCAA initially rejected his claims but eventually relented.

== Professional career ==
Autry was selected in the fourth round of the 1997 NFL draft by the Chicago Bears, where he played for one season, and also played one season for the Philadelphia Eagles.

== Career statistics ==
College statistics
Year	Team	G	Rushing					Receiving				
Year	Team	G	Att	Yards	Avg	Long	TD	Rec	Yards	Avg	Long	TD
1994	Northwestern	11	120	556	4.6	–	1	7	83	11.9	–	0
1995	Northwestern	12	387	1,785	4.6	–	17	27	168	6.2	–	1
1996	Northwestern	11	280	1,452	5.2	–	17	26	196	7.5	–	1
Career		34	787	3,793	4.8	–	35	51	378	7.4	–	2
