= 1995 Arizona Wildcats football team =

American college football season

1995 Arizona Wildcats football
- Conference: Pacific-10 Conference
- Record: 6–5 (4–4 Pac-10)
- Head coach: Dick Tomey (9th season)
- Offensive coordinator: Duane Akina (4th season)
- Defensive coordinator: Larry Mac Duff (9th season)
- Home stadium: Arizona Stadium

1995 Pacific-10 Conference football standings
	Conf.					Overall
Team	W		L		T	W		L		T
No. 12 USC ^ +	6	–	1	–	1	9	–	2	–	1
Washington +	6	–	1	–	1	7	–	4	–	1
No. 18 Oregon	6	–	2	–	0	9	–	3	–	0
Stanford	5	–	3	–	0	7	–	4	–	1
UCLA	4	–	4	–	0	7	–	5	–	0
Arizona	4	–	4	–	0	6	–	5	–	0
Arizona State	4	–	4	–	0	6	–	5	–	0
California	2	–	6	–	0	3	–	8	–	0
Washington State	2	–	6	–	0	3	–	8	–	0
Oregon State	0	–	8	–	0	1	–	10	–	0
+ – Conference co-champions; ^ – Rose Bowl representative per tie-breaking rules based on overall record, due to Washington-USC tie; Rankings from AP Poll

The 1995 Arizona Wildcats football team represented the University of Arizona in the Pacific-10 Conference (Pac-10) during the 1995 NCAA Division I-A football season. In their ninth season under head coach Dick Tomey, the Wildcats compiled a 6–5 record (4–4 against Pac-10 opponents), finished in a tie for fifth place in the Pac-10, and outscored their opponents, 207 to 199. The team played its home games in Arizona Stadium in Tucson, Arizona.

The team's statistical leaders included Dan White with 1,855 passing yards, Gary Taylor with 714 rushing yards, and Rodney Williams with 587 receiving yards. Linebacker Charlie Camp led the team with 90 tackles.

The season would be marred by tragedy and offensive inconsistency as the team dealt with a death of a player early and saw their Rose Bowl chances vanish due to several losses. Also, due to their mediocre record, the Wildcats did not get selected for a bowl game. A positive note of the season was a come-from-behind win over Arizona State that concluded the year.

== Schedule ==
Date	Time	Opponent	Rank	Site	TV	Result	Attendance	Source
September 2	7:00 p.m.	Pacific (CA)*	No. 19	Arizona Stadium; Tucson, AZ	KTTU	W 41–9	48,434	
September 7	7:00 p.m.	Georgia Tech*	No. 17	Arizona Stadium; Tucson, AZ	Prime	W 20–19	46,786	
September 16	11:30 a.m.	at Illinois*	No. 17	Memorial Stadium; Champaign, IL	ESPN	L 7–9	57,134	
September 23	7:00 p.m.	No. 5 USC	No. 25	Arizona Stadium; Tucson, AZ	Prime	L 10–31	58,503	
September 30	7:00 p.m.	California		Arizona Stadium; Tucson, AZ	KTTU	W 20–15	44,564	
October 14	4:00 p.m.	at UCLA		Rose Bowl; Pasadena, CA	ABC	L 10–17	43,798	
October 21	7:00 p.m.	No. 20 Washington		Arizona Stadium; Tucson, AZ	Prime	L 17–31	58,471	
October 28	1:30 p.m.	at Washington State		Martin Stadium; Pullman, WA		W 24–14	32,924	
November 4	8:30 p.m.	at Oregon State		Parker Stadium; Corvallis, OR	Prime	W 14–9	22,913	
November 11	1:30 p.m.	No. 17 Oregon^{†}		Arizona Stadium; Tucson, AZ	ABC	L 13–17	53,736	
November 24	4:00 p.m.	at Arizona State		Sun Devil Stadium; Tempe, AZ (rivalry)	ABC	W 31–28	67,606	
*Non-conference game; ^{†}Homecoming; Rankings from AP Poll released prior to the game; All times are in Mountain time

== Before the season ==
Arizona completed the 1994 season with an 8–4 record and lost to Utah in the Freedom Bowl. The season began with hopes for a possible Rose Bowl or even a national championship, with the Wildcats’ dominant “Desert Swarm” defense leading the way. However, Arizona struggled down the stretch, which ended their chances at the Rose Bowl but recovered to beat rival Arizona State and still made a bowl game.

Entering the 1995 season, Arizona defensive end Tedy Bruschi, who became the de facto leader of the Desert Swarm, decided to return for his senior season instead of going to the NFL, in an attempt for one last crack at the Rose Bowl and to help the team improve from their previous season's record. Also, the Wildcats spent the offseason rebuilding the offense so that they could score more points. By the start of the preseason, Arizona was ranked 19th in the polls.

== Game summaries ==
=== Pacific (CA) ===
Arizona began the season at home against Pacific. The Desert Swarm, led by Bruschi, would dominate all game long and an improved Wildcat offense did enough to earn the victory.

=== Georgia Tech ===
In their next game, the Wildcats hosted Georgia Tech in yet another Thursday night meeting between the two teams. The Yellow Jackets were looking to avenge their loss to Arizona in the previous season where they saw the Wildcats come back late with a winning touchdown.

The Wildcats would play poorly by making mistakes, which gave the Jackets momentum, although the Desert Swarm kept Arizona in it. Midway through the fourth quarter, Georgia Tech led 19–7, and it seemed like they were on their way to vengeance. However, Arizona stormed back with a touchdown, then a blocked punt put them in position for the lead. A quarterback sneak into the end zone put the Wildcats ahead at 20–19 with over two minutes remaining (they would miss a two-point conversion attempt). The Swarm then stopped Georgia Tech on their final drive and the Wildcats survived yet another upset scare from the Jackets. It was the second consecutive year that Arizona came back late to beat the Jackets. As of today, this would be the last time that Arizona played Georgia Tech.

The victory would be overshadowed by tragic news for the Wildcats, as tight end Damon Terrell died in a Tucson hospital during halftime after collapsing during practice in August. The team received the sad news after the game ended and Tomey and the players declined postgame interviews to grieve over Terrell's death. In the wake of Terrell's death, the team cancelled practice for a week out of respect, and would dedicate the rest of the season to their late teammate.

An autopsy determined that Terrell had succumbed to complications from heart failure and a ruptured spleen.

=== Illinois ===
Arizona went on the road for the first time in the season, and faced Illinois. The Wildcats, still recovering from the loss of Terrell, went onto the sideline during pregame and formed a “DT” to honor Terrell.

During the game, both teams’ defense were in control. In the fourth quarter, the Wildcats led 7–3 and would make a crucial mistake, as the Illini forced a fumble and returned it for a touchdown to take the lead (the extra point attempt was missed). Arizona would do nothing on their last possession and Illinois captured the victory. Tomey missed the game to attend Terrell's funeral. Offensive coordinator Duane Akina coached the team in his place, although the loss would count towards Tomey's record.

=== USC ===
Arizona returned home to take on fifth-ranked USC in a tough test. Tomey returned to the sidelines after missing the Wildcats’ loss at Illinois. Arizona Stadium held a moment of silence for Terrell during pregame and the team hoped to get an upset win for their fallen player.

In the game, however, the Trojans’ offense would be too much for the Desert Swarm. Arizona did not find the end zone until late in the fourth quarter, as they would lose their second straight game.

=== UCLA ===
Arizona went back on the road to play UCLA. In the Wildcats’ previous visit to the Rose Bowl (in 1993), they ended up being dominated by the Bruins that ruined their unbeaten season at the time and was kept from earning both an outright Pac-10 title and Rose Bowl berth.

This year, Arizona played tough with the Bruins. Despite the Desert Swarm holding UCLA in check, the Wildcat offense made several mistakes, including a lost fumble that was returned for a Bruin touchdown early in the game. UCLA seemed to break it open midway through the fourth quarter with another touchdown to lead 17–0. The Wildcats responded with ten unanswered points to come within seven but would ultimately come up short. The loss would jeopardize Arizona's chances at a Rose Bowl bid and that the Wildcats had to win out to achieve that goal.

=== Washington ===
In their next game, the Wildcats hosted 20th-ranked Washington at home and looked to stay in the hunt for the Rose Bowl. It was the first meeting between both teams since 1992, when the Desert Swarm-led Wildcats shut down the Huskies in a massive upset. However, this time, it was the Huskies that relied on their defense to shut down the Wildcats. Again, turnovers would haunt Arizona and Washington cashed in with more points to pull away and avenge their 1992 loss to Arizona.

With the loss, Arizona's Rose Bowl hopes were presumably ended for good.

=== Oregon ===
On homecoming weekend (as well as the home finale), Arizona faced Oregon, who was ranked 17th. The Wildcats were attempting to avenge their loss to the Ducks in the previous year, in which Oregon went on to play in the Rose Bowl. Things started to look promising for the Wildcats, as they got to an early lead. After the Ducks came back to take the lead in the third quarter, Arizona drove into Oregon territory and threatened to get the lead back. However, Oregon would make a goal line stand on fourth down and the Wildcats came up empty (they passed up a field goal chance). In the fourth quarter, Arizona would do nothing and fell short, and that their chances of a bowl game became slim.

=== Arizona State ===
In the “Duel in the Desert”, the Wildcats traveled to Arizona State and were hoping to at least end the regular season on a high note. Early on, things didn't look good for Arizona, as they committed turnovers that led to ASU points. By the fourth quarter, another Wildcat mistake would lead to the Sun Devils taking a 28–14 lead with under eight minutes left.

The Wildcats would slowly climb back and scored to cut Arizona State's lead to seven before the game turned around. On ASU's next possession, a sack by the Desert Swarm led to a fumble that was returned for a touchdown and the Wildcats tied it up at 28 with five and a half minutes left. After stopping ASU, Arizona began their final drive and got into Sun Devil territory. Arizona State would force a fourth down in the final minute which led to a field goal attempt by the Wildcats. The kick was successful and Arizona led 31–28 with under 30 seconds to play. ASU had one final chance, but came up empty and the Wildcats completed the comeback for the victory and seemingly ended ASU's bowl chances. It was the second season in a row that Arizona overcame a deficit of ten or more points in the final quarter to win and give ASU a painful loss.

Another notable moment occurred on the game's second-to-last play, as Bruschi recorded a sack that tied the NCAA record for career sacks by one player at 52.

== Awards and honors ==
- Tedy Bruschi, DE, Pac-10 defensive player of the year, Pac-10 Morris Trophy winner (defense), Consensus All-American, First-team All-Pac-10

== Season notes ==
- Arizona ended the season with yet another winning record (6–5) but did not get a bowl selection due to losses to ranked opponents and that the six wins weren't good enough.
- The Wildcats opened the season with a win against Pacific. This season would be the last one played for the Pacific football program, as they would shutter the program afterward due to budgetary reasons.
- After the death of Damon Terrell early in the season, the Wildcats would dedicate the rest of the year to him. The team wore black patches with “DT” on their jerseys and also wore “DT” stickers on their helmets throughout the season. Also, the comeback win over Arizona State in the finale was dedicated to Terrell. Terrell's death may have likely affected the Wildcats’ play during the season which led to only six wins.
- The game against Washington State was the only one of the season that was not televised in Arizona due to it airing locally in the Spokane, WA TV market, where Washington State is located in. The game was originally going to be broadcast on cable, but the broadcasting window was full and that the game wouldn't be competitive enough.
- Arizona wore all-white uniforms against Oregon State, as they wore their white pants (normally for home games). The Wildcats believed that by wearing their blue pants (which would often be worn during road games for a majority of the Desert Swarm era) would blend into Oregon State's home black jerseys. It was the first time since 1992 that Arizona wore white pants on the road, as they wore the blue ones for all road games in 1993 and 1994.
- The loss to Oregon may have likely cost the Wildcats a chance at the postseason.
- Arizona kicker Jonathan Prasuhn, who kicked the game-winning field goal, joined Brett Weber (1979) and Max Zendejas (1983 and 1985) as one of the few kickers to beat Arizona State with a late field goal, with the games having played in Tempe (so far, it has yet to occur in Tucson where a Wildcat kicker wins the game against the Sun Devils).
- Bruschi's performance during the season, including tying the NCAA career sack record, earned him the Pac-10 defensive player of the year award. Had Arizona went to a bowl, Bruschi would have likely broken the record.
- This was the final season in which games ended in ties. None of Arizona's games ended in a tie, with the finale against Arizona State was the closest to doing so. Overtime periods to break ties went into effect in 1996.

== After the season ==
The Wildcats finished the 1995 season on a positive note. Several players from the Desert Swarm would graduate after the season, including Bruschi, and the team had to replace them with newer talent and left remnants of the Swarm returning for the 1996 season. Bruschi would go on to have a successful career in the NFL, and would win three Super Bowls with the New England Patriots. Fans have often rated him as one of the greatest Wildcat defensive players.

In addition to the team's rebuild for 1996, Tomey would recruit talented offensive players that would become dominant in the late 1990s and would lead to an unforgettable 1998 season.
