= 1995 Stanford Cardinal football team =

American college football season

1995 Stanford Cardinal football

Liberty Bowl, L 13–19 vs. East Carolina
- Conference: Pacific-10 Conference
- Record: 7–4–1 (5–3 Pac-10)
- Head coach: Tyrone Willingham (1st season)
- Offensive coordinator: Dana Bible (1st season)
- Offensive scheme: West Coast
- Defensive coordinator: Bill Harris (1st season)
- Base defense: 4–3
- Home stadium: Stanford Stadium

1995 Pacific-10 Conference football standings
	Conf.					Overall
Team	W		L		T	W		L		T
No. 12 USC ^ +	6	–	1	–	1	9	–	2	–	1
Washington +	6	–	1	–	1	7	–	4	–	1
No. 18 Oregon	6	–	2	–	0	9	–	3	–	0
Stanford	5	–	3	–	0	7	–	4	–	1
UCLA	4	–	4	–	0	7	–	5	–	0
Arizona	4	–	4	–	0	6	–	5	–	0
Arizona State	4	–	4	–	0	6	–	5	–	0
California	2	–	6	–	0	3	–	8	–	0
Washington State	2	–	6	–	0	3	–	8	–	0
Oregon State	0	–	8	–	0	1	–	10	–	0
+ – Conference co-champions; ^ – Rose Bowl representative per tie-breaking rules based on overall record, due to Washington-USC tie; Rankings from AP Poll

The 1995 Stanford Cardinal football team represented Stanford Universityas a member of the Pacific-10 Conference (Pac-10) during 1995 NCAA Division I-A football season. Led by first-year head coach Tyrone Willingham, the Cardinal compiled an overall record of 7–4–1 with a mark of 5–3 in conference play, placing fourth in the Pac-10. Stanford was invited to the Liberty Bowl, where the Cardinal lost to East Carolina. The team played home games at Stanford Stadium in Stanford, California.

== Schedule ==
Date	Time	Opponent	Rank	Site	TV	Result	Attendance	Source
September 2	1:30 p.m.	at San Jose State*		Spartan Stadium; San Jose, CA (rivalry)		W 47–33	28,467	
September 9	6:00 p.m.	at Utah*		Robert Rice Stadium; Salt Lake City, UT		W 27–20	32,107	
September 16	3:30 p.m.	Wisconsin*		Stanford Stadium; Stanford, CA		T 24–24	42,510	
September 23	1:00 p.m.	No. 12 Oregon		Autzen Stadium; Eugene, OR (rivalry)		W 28–21	45,237	
October 7	6:00 p.m.	at Arizona State	No. 19	Sun Devil Stadium; Tempe, AZ		W 30–28	41,625	
October 14	2:00 p.m.	No. 24 Washington	No. 16	Stanford Stadium; Stanford, CA		L 28–38	45,210	
October 21	12:30 p.m.	UCLA	No. 23	Stanford Stadium; Stanford, CA (rivalry)	ABC	L 28–42	45,075	
October 28	3:30 p.m.	Oregon State		Stanford Stadium; Stanford, CA	PSN	W 24–3	30,665	
November 4	12:30 p.m.	at No. 14 USC		Los Angeles Memorial Coliseum; Los Angeles, CA (rivalry)	ABC	L 30–31	62,368	
November 11	3:30 p.m.	at Washington State		Martin Stadium; Pullman, WA	PSN	W 36–24	36,572	
November 18	1:00 p.m.	California		Stanford Stadium; Stanford, CA (Big Game)		W 29–24	72,893	
December 30	9:00 a.m.	East Carolina*		Liberty Bowl Memorial Stadium; Memphis, TN (Liberty Bowl)	ESPN	L 13–19	47,398	
*Non-conference game; Rankings from AP Poll released prior to the game; All times are in Pacific time

== Roster ==
1995 Stanford Cardinal football team roster
Players
Coaches
Offense

Pos.	#	Name	Class
G	78	Brad Badger	Jr
TE	87	Greg Clark	Jr
FB	34	Greg Comella	Jr
WR	80	Damon Dunn	So
QB	19	Chad Hutchinson	Fr
WR	88	Brian Manning	Jr

Defense

Pos.	#	Name	Class
ILB	33	Chris Draft	So
DB		Kwame Ellis	Sr
DE	75	Carl Hansen	So
LB	13	Kailee Wong	So

Special teams

Pos.	#	Name	Class

Head coach

- Tyrone Willingham

Coordinators/assistant coaches

- Dana Bible – Offensive coordinator and quarterbacks
- Don Treadwell – Running backs
- Mose Rison – wide receivers
- Dave Borbely – Offensive line (centers and guards)
- Patrick Morris – Tight ends and offensive line (tackles)
- Bill Harris – Defensive coordinator and defensive backs
- Phil Zacharias – Defensive ends and special teams coordinator
- Kent Baer – Inside and outside linebacker
- Dave Tipton – Recruiting coordinator

Legend

- (C) Team captain
- (S) Suspended
- (I) Ineligible
- Injured
- Redshirt
