= Mark Butterfield =

American football player (born 1974)

No. 7, 10
- Position: Quarterback

Personal information
- Born: July 14, 1974 (age 52); Antioch, California, U.S.
- Listed height: 6 ft 4 in (1.93 m)
- Listed weight: 215 lb (98 kg)

Career information
- High school: Antioch
- College: Stanford
- NFL draft: 1996: undrafted

Career history
- Arizona Cardinals (1996)*; Chicago Bears (1996); Scottish Claymores (1998); Frankfurt Galaxy (1998)
- * Offseason or practice squad member only

Awards and highlights
- Second-team All-Pac-10 (1995)

Mark Butterfield (born July 14, 1974) is an American former professional football player who was a quarterback in the National Football League (NFL). He played college football for the Stanford Cardinal from 1992 to 1995. Butterfield was a member of the Arizona Cardinals and Chicago Bears in the NFL. He later spent time with the Scottish Claymores and Frankfurt Galaxy of the NFL Europe.

== Collegiate career ==
Butterfield was a three-sport athlete for Antioch High School, participating in baseball, basketball and football. He was considered the 7th best quarterback in the nation during the 1992 recruiting cycle and ultimately signed with Stanford.

Butterfield spent his first three seasons on campus as backup to Steve Stenstrom. Upon assuming starting duties in his senior year, Butterfield accumulated 2,533 passing yards, 19 touchdown passes and 9 interceptions on a 58.3% completion rate. Stanford had a 7-3-1 record during the regular season, losing the 1995 Liberty Bowl to East Carolina. He earned second-team All-Pac 10 honors for his efforts.

== Professional career ==
After going undrafted in 1996, Butterfield joined the Arizona Cardinals practice squad. The Chicago Bears signed Butterfield to their active roster in response to a string of injuries suffered by multiple quarterbacks, including former Stanford teammate Steve Stenstrom. He served as the Bears' third-string quarterback.

Butterfield would later spend time in NFL Europe, which included durations with the Scottish Claymores and Frankfurt Galaxy.

== Personal life ==
Butterfield is the father of former Oregon and current San Jose State quarterback Jay Butterfield, who was ranked as the 5th overall pro style quarterback prospect in the 2020 recruiting cycle by 247Sports.
