= Antioch High School =

Public high school in California, United States

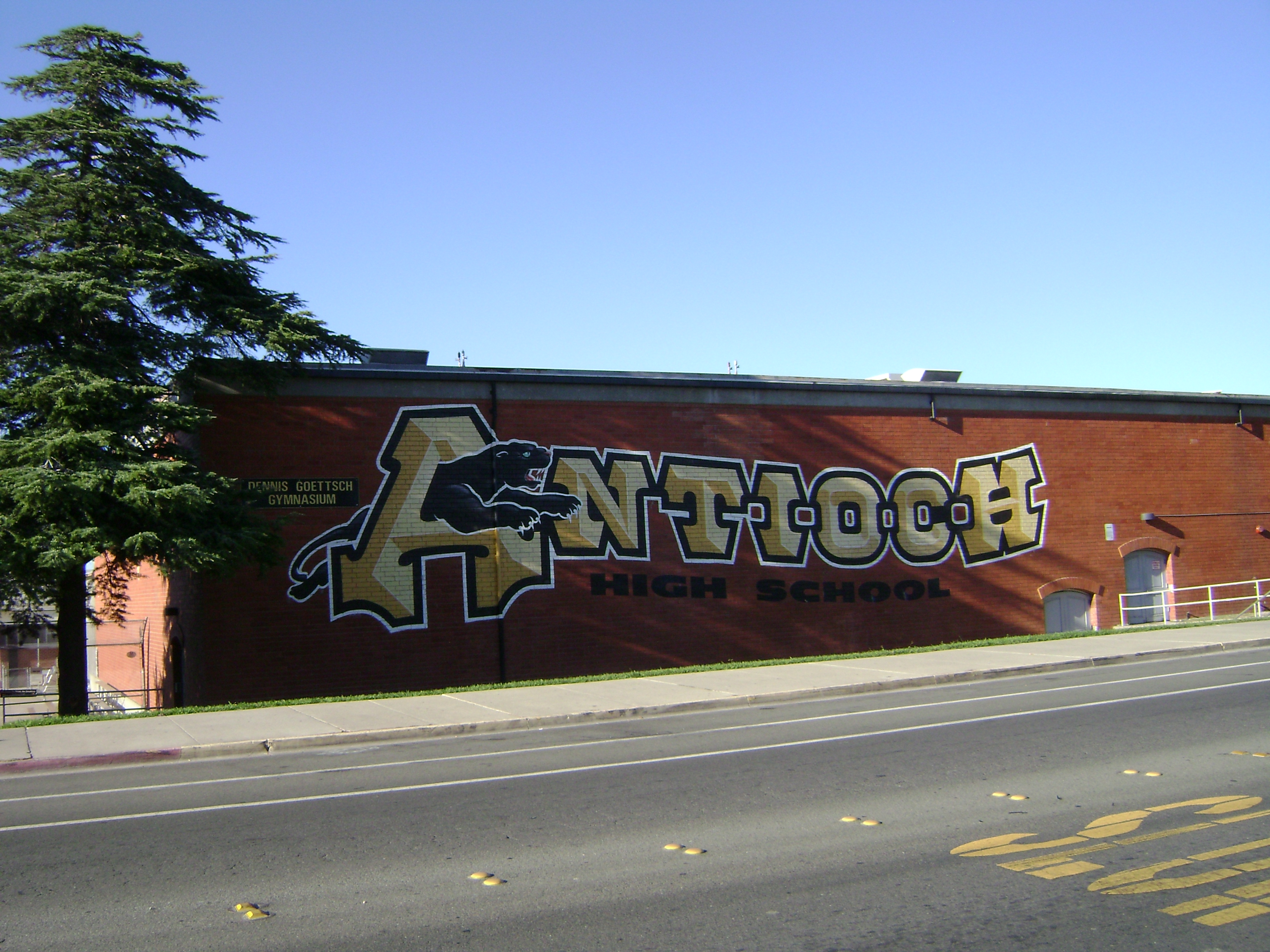

Location
- 700 West 18th Street; Antioch, California 94509; United States; 38.005021°N 121.814967°W

Information
- School district: Antioch Unified School District
- CEEB code: 050115
- Principal: John Jimno
- Teaching staff: 85.09 FTE
- Grades: 9-12
- Enrollment: 1,776 (2024–2025)
- Student to teacher ratio: 20.87
- Colors: Black and gold
- Mascot: Panther
- Team name: Panthers
- Accreditation: WASC
- Newspaper: The Prowler
- Yearbook: The Panther
- Website: https://www.antiochschools.net/o/ahs

Antioch High School, a public high school serving grades 9–12 in Antioch, California, located at 700 West 18th Street. Established in 1955, it is part of the Antioch Unified School District and enrolled about 1,823 students during the 2023–2024 school year. The campus has undergone phased modernization funded by district Measure B bond projects, and the school hosts several career academies, including EDGE (Engineering and Designing a Greener Environment), Environmental Studies, LEAD (Leadership and Public Service), and Media/Tech.

== History ==
AHS opened in Antioch, California in 1955. It is the second high school in Antioch, replacing the old high school (which is now the city museum). The school is currently being remodeled with upgrades throughout the entire school. This project is now completed.

== Academies ==
=== EDGE ===
In 2010, Antioch High started the Academy of Engineering and Designing a Greener Environment (EDGE) which is a pathway that integrates the core classes with an engineering class to give students a peek into careers in engineering. Professor Jason Ebner from UC Berkeley gives instruction at this institution.

=== Environmental Studies ===
In 2012, Antioch launched an Environmental Studies Academy.

=== LEAD ===
In 2012, Antioch launched a Leadership and Public Service Academy.

=== Media/Tech ===
In 2012, Antioch launched a Media/Tech Academy.

== Notable alumni ==
- Frank Beede, former NFL offensive lineman
- Mark Butterfield, former Stanford Cardinal and NFL quarterback
- Gil Castillo, amateur wrestler; retired professional MMA fighter
- Carmen Dragon, musical composer, arranger, and conductor
- Anthony C. Ferrante, director
- Najee Harris, running back for the New York Giants
- Mike Lucky, former NFL tight end
- Gino Marchetti, NFL Hall of Fame inductee, and the league's MVP in 1958
- Aaron Miles, former MLB infielder for the St. Louis Cardinals
- the Mitchell Brothers Jim and Artie Mitchell, known for their strip tease and pornography businesses
- Michael Shane Neal, portrait artist
- Jeremy Newberry, former NFL offensive lineman
- Jeff Pico, pitching coach for the Cincinnati Reds; former Chicago Cubs pitcher
- Evan Pilgrim, former football offensive guard
- Ron Pritchard, former football linebacker and professional wrestler; played nine seasons with the Houston Oilers and the Cincinnati Bengals
- Duane Putnam, class of 1951, former football offensive guard who spent ten seasons in the National Football League for the Los Angeles Rams, Dallas Cowboys, and the Cleveland Browns
- Alex Sanchez, class of 1984, former MLB pitcher for the Toronto Blue Jays in 1989 and all-Pac-10 standout at UCLA
- Michael Semanick, class of 1981, Academy Award-winning motion picture sound mixer (The Lord of the Rings: The Return of the King and King Kong)
- Gary Sheide, former football quarterback for Brigham Young University
- Larry Silveira, professional golfer who played on the PGA Tour and the Nationwide Tour
- Jason Verduzco, former CFL player and NFL coach.
