= 1995 USC Trojans football team =

American college football season

1995 USC Trojans football

Pac-10 co-champion Rose Bowl champion

Rose Bowl, W 41–32 vs. Northwestern
- Conference: Pacific-10 Conference

Ranking
- Coaches: No. 11
- AP: No. 12
- Record: 9–2–1 (6–1–1 Pac-10)
- Head coach: John Robinson (10th season)
- Offensive coordinator: Mike Riley (3rd season)
- Defensive coordinator: Keith Burns (2nd season)
- Captain: Terry Barnum; Errick Herrin
- Home stadium: Los Angeles Memorial Coliseum

1995 Pacific-10 Conference football standings
| | Conf. | | | | | Overall |
| Team | W | | L | | T | W | | L | | T |
|---|---|---|---|---|---|---|---|---|---|---|
| No. 12 USC ^ + | 6 | – | 1 | – | 1 | 9 | – | 2 | – | 1 |
| Washington + | 6 | – | 1 | – | 1 | 7 | – | 4 | – | 1 |
| No. 18 Oregon | 6 | – | 2 | – | 0 | 9 | – | 3 | – | 0 |
| Stanford | 5 | – | 3 | – | 0 | 7 | – | 4 | – | 1 |
| UCLA | 4 | – | 4 | – | 0 | 7 | – | 5 | – | 0 |
| Arizona | 4 | – | 4 | – | 0 | 6 | – | 5 | – | 0 |
| Arizona State | 4 | – | 4 | – | 0 | 6 | – | 5 | – | 0 |
| California | 2 | – | 6 | – | 0 | 3 | – | 8 | – | 0 |
| Washington State | 2 | – | 6 | – | 0 | 3 | – | 8 | – | 0 |
| Oregon State | 0 | – | 8 | – | 0 | 1 | – | 10 | – | 0 |
+ – Conference co-champions; ^ – Rose Bowl representative per tie-breaking rules based on overall record, due to Washington-USC tie; Rankings from AP Poll

The 1995 USC Trojans football team represented the University of Southern California (USC) in the 1995 NCAA Division I-A football season. In their tenth year under head coach John Robinson, the Trojans compiled a 9–2–1 record (6–1–1 against conference opponents), shared the Pacific-10 Conference (Pac-10) championship with Washington, and outscored their opponents by a combined total of 355 to 212.

Quarterback Brad Otton led the team in passing, completing 159 of 256 passes for 1,923 yards with 14 touchdowns and four interceptions. Delon Washington led the team in rushing with 236 carries for 1,109 yards and six touchdowns. Keyshawn Johnson led the team in receiving with 102 catches for 1,434 yards and seven touchdowns.

== Schedule ==
| Date | Time | Opponent | Rank | Site | TV | Result | Attendance |
|---|---|---|---|---|---|---|---|
| September 9 | 3:30 p.m. | San Jose State* | No. 7 | Los Angeles Memorial Coliseum; Los Angeles, CA | Prime | W 45–7 | 50,612 |
| September 16 | 7:15 p.m. | Houston* | No. 6 | Los Angeles Memorial Coliseum; Los Angeles, CA | Prime | W 45–10 | 50,279 |
| September 23 | 7:15 p.m. | at No. 25 Arizona | No. 5 | Arizona Stadium; Tucson, AZ | Prime | W 31–10 | 58,503 |
| September 30 | 4:00 p.m. | Arizona State | No. 5 | Los Angeles Memorial Coliseum; Los Angeles, CA | ABC | W 31–0 | 52,577 |
| October 7 | 3:30 p.m. | at California | No. 5 | California Memorial Stadium; Berkeley, CA | Prime | W 26–16 | 49,000 |
| October 14 | 12:30 p.m. | Washington State | No. 5 | Los Angeles Memorial Coliseum; Los Angeles, CA | ABC | W 26–14 | 51,131 |
| October 21 | 11:30 .m. | at No. 17 Notre Dame* | No. 5 | Notre Dame Stadium; Notre Dame, IN (rivalry, College GameDay) | NBC | L 10–38 | 59,075 |
| October 28 | 12:30 p.m. | at No. 17 Washington | No. 13 | Husky Stadium; Seattle, WA | ABC | T 21–21 | 74,421 |
| November 4 | 12:30 p.m. | Stanford^{†} | No. 14 | Los Angeles Memorial Coliseum; Los Angeles, CA (rivalry) | ABC | W 31–30 | 62,368 |
| November 11 | 7:00 p.m. | at Oregon State | No. 12 | Parker Stadium; Corvallis, OR | Prime | W 28–10 | 21,851 |
| November 18 | 12:30 p.m. | UCLA | No. 11 | Los Angeles Memorial Coliseum; Los Angeles, CA (Victory Bell) | ABC | L 20–24 | 91,363 |
| January 1, 1996 | 2:00 p.m. | vs. No. 3 Northwestern* | No. 17 | Rose Bowl; Pasadena, CA (Rose Bowl) | ABC | W 41–32 | 100,102 |
*Non-conference game; ^{†}Homecoming; Rankings from AP Poll released prior to the game; All times are in Pacific time

== Roster ==
1995 USC Trojans football team roster
Players
Coaches
Offense

| Pos. | # | Name | Class |
|---|---|---|---|
| TE | 84 | John Allred | Jr |
| TE | | Tyler Cashman | Sr |
| TE | 84 | Jeff Diltz | Jr |
| OT | 71 | John Michels | Sr |
| G | 68 | Kyle Ramsay | Sr |
| C | 56 | Jeremy Hogue | Sr |
| G | 67 | Chris Brymer | So |
| OT | 76 | Norberto Garrido | Sr |
| C | 53 | Robert Loya | Sr |
| WR | 3 | Keyshawn Johnson | Sr |
| TE | 81 | Johnny McWilliams | Sr |
| WR | 2 | Chris Miller | Jr |
| QB | 7 | Kyle Wachholtz | Sr |
| QB | 10 | Brad Otton | Jr |

Defense

| Pos. | # | Name | Class |
|---|---|---|---|
| S | 9 | Sammy Knight | Jr |
| DT | 96 | Darrell Russell | So |
| DL | 55 | Israel Ifeanyi | Sr |
| DL | | Matt Keneley | Jr |
| DL | | Stuart Gage | Sr |
| LB | | Brian Haas | Sr |
| LB | 10 | Errick Herrin | Sr |

Special teams

| Pos. | # | Name | Class |
|---|---|---|---|
| K | 19 | Adam Abrams | Fr |
| P | | John Stonehouse | Sr |

Head coach

- John Robinson

Coordinators/assistant coaches

- Keith Burns (defensive coordinator)

Legend

- (C) Team captain
- (S) Suspended
- (I) Ineligible
- Injured
- Redshirt

== Game summaries ==
=== Notre Dame ===
#5 USC Trojans at #17 Notre Dame Fighting Irish

| Quarter | 1 | 2 | 3 | 4 | Total |
|---|---|---|---|---|---|
| USC | 0 | 7 | 3 | 0 | 10 |
| Notre Dame | 6 | 15 | 0 | 17 | 38 |

at Notre Dame Stadium, Notre Dame, Indiana

- Date: October 21, 1995
- Game time: 2:30 p.m. EST
- Game attendance: 59,075
- TV: NBC
- Box Score

Game information
First quarter
- ND - M. Edwards 9-yard run (kick failed)

Second quarter

- USC - K. Johnson 17-yard pass from Wachholtz (Renden kick)
- ND - M. Edwards 2-yard run (R. Powlus reception for two-point conversion)
- ND - A. Denson 4-yard run (Kopka kick)

Third quarter

- USC - Renden 25-yard field goal

Fourth quarter

- ND - Safety, K. Minor tackled K. Wachholtz in end zone
- ND - P. Chryplewicz 2-yard pass from Powlus (Edwards run for two-point conversion)
- ND - M. Edwards 1-yard run (Kopka kick)

=== Rose Bowl ===
#3 Northwestern Wildcats vs. #17 USC Trojans

| Quarter | 1 | 2 | 3 | 4 | Total |
|---|---|---|---|---|---|
| Northwestern | 7 | 3 | 16 | 6 | 32 |
| USC | 7 | 17 | 7 | 10 | 41 |

at Rose Bowl, Pasadena, California

- Date: January 1, 1996
- Game time: 2:00 p.m. PST
- Game attendance: 100,102
- Referee: Randy Christal
- TV announcers (ABC): Keith Jackson, Bob Griese, and Lynn Swann
- Box Score

Game information

Scoring summary
| Q1 | 10:02 | USC | Lavale Woods 1-yard run (Abrams kick) | USC 7–0 |
| Q1 | 6:05 | NW | Darnell Autry 3-yard run (Gowins kick) | Tied 7–7 |
| Q2 | 13:05 | USC | Terry Barnum 21-yard pass from Brad Otton (Abrams kick) | USC 14–7 |
| Q2 | 3:29 | USC | Adam Abrams 30-yard field goal | USC 17–7 |
| Q2 | 2:56 | USC | Daylon McCutcheon 53-yard fumble return (Abrams kick) | USC 24–7 |
| Q2 | 0:02 | NW | Brian Gowins 29-yard field goal | USC 24–10 |
| Q3 | 11:01 | NW | Brian Gowins 28-yard field goal | USC 24–13 |
| Q3 | 8:17 | NW | Darnell Autry 3-yard run (conversion failed) | USC 24–19 |
| Q2 | 6:08 | USC | Keyshawn Johnson 56-yard pass from Brad Otton (Abrams kick) | USC 31–19 |
| Q3 | 2:58 | NW | Steve Schnur 1-yard run (Gowins kick) | USC 31–26 |
| Q4 | 13:01 | NW | Darnell Autry 2-yard run (conversion failed) | NW 32–31 |
| Q4 | 9:09 | USC | Adam Abrams 46-yard field goal | USC 34–32 |
| Q4 | 2:55 | USC | Delon Washington 2-yard run (Abrams kick) | USC 41–32 |

== 1995 Trojans in professional football ==
The following players were claimed in the 1996 NFL draft.

| Player | Position | Round | Pick | NFL club |
| Keyshawn Johnson | Wide receiver | 1 | 1 | New York Jets |
| John Michels | Tackle | 1 | 27 | Green Bay Packers |
| Israel Ifeanyi | Defensive end | 2 | 46 | San Francisco 49ers |
| Johnny McWilliams | Tight end | 3 | 64 | Arizona Cardinals |
| Norberto Garrido | Guard | 4 | 106 | Carolina Panthers |
| Kyle Wachholz | Quarterback | 7 | 240 | Green Bay Packers |

Other NFL players (from different drafts and free agent pickups):

- John Allred
- Rashard Cook
- Brian Kelly
- Matt Keneley
- Daylon McCutcheon
- Billy Miller
- Chris Miller
- Larry Parker
- Darrell Russell
