= 1995 UCLA Bruins football team =

American college football season

1995 UCLA Bruins football

Aloha Bowl, L 30–51 vs. Kansas
- Conference: Pacific-10 Conference
- Record: 7–5 (4–4 Pac-10)
- Head coach: Terry Donahue (20th season)
- Offensive coordinator: Bob Toledo (2nd season)
- Defensive coordinator: Bob Field (14th season)
- Home stadium: Rose Bowl

1995 Pacific-10 Conference football standings
	Conf.					Overall
Team	W		L		T	W		L		T
No. 12 USC ^ +	6	–	1	–	1	9	–	2	–	1
Washington +	6	–	1	–	1	7	–	4	–	1
No. 18 Oregon	6	–	2	–	0	9	–	3	–	0
Stanford	5	–	3	–	0	7	–	4	–	1
UCLA	4	–	4	–	0	7	–	5	–	0
Arizona	4	–	4	–	0	6	–	5	–	0
Arizona State	4	–	4	–	0	6	–	5	–	0
California	2	–	6	–	0	3	–	8	–	0
Washington State	2	–	6	–	0	3	–	8	–	0
Oregon State	0	–	8	–	0	1	–	10	–	0
+ – Conference co-champions; ^ – Rose Bowl representative per tie-breaking rules based on overall record, due to Washington-USC tie; Rankings from AP Poll

The 1995 UCLA Bruins football team represented the University of California, Los Angeles (UCLA) as a member of the Pacific-10 Conference (Pac-10) during the 1995 NCAA Division I-A football season. Led by Terry Donahue in his 20th and final season as head coach, the Bruins compiled an overall record of 7–5 with a mark of 4–4 in conference play, placing in a three-way tie for fifth in the Pac-10. UCLA was invited to the Aloha Bowl, where the Bruins lost to Kansas. The team played home games at the Rose Bowl in Pasadena, California.

== Schedule ==
Date	Time	Opponent	Rank	Site	TV	Result	Attendance
September 2	5:00 pm	No. 12 Miami (FL)*	No. 15	Rose Bowl; Pasadena, CA	ABC	W 31–8	60,091
September 9	4:00 pm	at BYU*	No. 12	Cougar Stadium; Provo, UT	ABC	W 23–9	60,379
September 16	12:30 pm	No. 20 Oregon	No. 12	Rose Bowl; Pasadena, CA	ABC	L 31–38	42,537
September 23	12:30 pm	at Washington State	No. 16	Martin Stadium; Pullman, WA	ABC	L 15–24	33,711
September 30	7:00 pm	Fresno State*		Rose Bowl; Pasadena, CA	PSN	W 45–21	44,449
October 14	4:00 pm	Arizona		Rose Bowl; Pasadena, CA	ABC	W 17–10	43,798
October 21	12:30 pm	at No. 23 Stanford		Stanford Stadium; Stanford, CA (rivalry)	ABC	W 42–28	45,075
October 28	12:30 pm	California	No. 24	Rose Bowl; Pasadena, CA (rivalry)		W 33–16	53,614
November 4	3:30 pm	at Arizona State	No. 22	Sun Devil Stadium; Tempe, AZ	PSN	L 33–37	48,126
November 11	12:30 pm	No. 22 Washington		Rose Bowl; Pasadena, CA		L 14–38	50,104
November 18	12:30 pm	at No. 11 USC		Los Angeles Memorial Coliseum; Los Angeles, CA (Victory Bell)	ABC	W 24–20	91,363
December 25	12:30 pm	vs. No. 11 Kansas*		Aloha Stadium; Halawa, HI (Aloha Bowl)	ABC	L 30–51	41,112
*Non-conference game; Rankings from AP Poll released prior to the game; All times are in Pacific time

== Game summaries ==
=== Miami (FL) ===
#12 Miami Hurricanes at #15 UCLA Bruins

Quarter	1	2	3	4	Total
Miami (FL)	0	0	0	8	8
UCLA	3	0	14	14	31

at Rose Bowl, Pasadena, California

- Date: September 2, 1995
- Game attendance: 60,091
- Box score

Game information
First quarter
- UCLA - B. Merten 24-yard field goal

Second quarter

- No scoring

Third quarter

- UCLA - A. McCullough recovered fumble in end zone (B. Merten kick)
- UCLA - K. Abdul-Jabbar 9-yard run (B. Merten kick)

Fourth quarter

- UCLA - K. Abdul-Jabbar 6-yard run (B. Merten kick)
- UM - S. Tucker 10-yard pass from R. Collins (J. German pass conversion)
- UCLA - J. Milliner 1-yard run (B. Merten kick)

=== Aloha Bowl ===
	1	2	3	4	Total
UCLA	0	0	7	23	30
Kansas	7	10	20	14	51

First quarter scoring: KU—Jim Moore, nine-yard pass from Mark Williams (Jeff McCord converts)

Second quarter scoring: KU—June Henley, 49-yard run. McCord converts; KU—McCord, 27-yard field goal.

Third quarter scoring KU—Henley, two-yard run. McCord kick fails; UCLA—Brad Melsby, eight-yard pass from Cade McNown (Bjorn Merten kick); KU—Isaac Byrd, 77-yard pass from Williams (McCord converts); KU—Andre Carter, 27-yard pass from Williams (McCord converts)

Fourth quarter scoring UCLA—Kevin Jordan, eight-yard pass from McNown (Merten kick); UCLA – Karim Abdul-Jabbar five-yard run (Melsby pass from McNown); KU—Williams, six-yard run (McCord converts); UCLA—Melsby, seven-yard pass from McNown (Abdul-Jabbar run); KU—Eric Vann, 67-yard run (McCord converts)

Running back Karim Abdul-Jabbar was named MVP of the Aloha Bowl.

== Roster ==
1995 UCLA Bruins football team roster
Players
Coaches
Offense

Pos.	#	Name	Class
OT	71	Kris Farris	Fr
RB	20	Skip Hicks	So
WR	4	Kevin Jordan	Sr
QB	18	Cade McNown	Fr
OT	79	Jonathan Ogden	Sr

Defense

Pos.	#	Name	Class
CB	35	Larry Atkins	Fr
LB	50	Brendon Ayanbadejo	Fr
LB	23	Donnie Edwards	Sr
DE	97	Phillip Ward	Jr

Special teams

Pos.	#	Name	Class

Head coach

- Terry Donahue

Coordinators/assistant coaches

Legend

- (C) Team captain
- (S) Suspended
- (I) Ineligible
- Injured
- Redshirt
