= 1995 Northwestern Wildcats football team =

American college football season

1995 Northwestern Wildcats football

Big Ten champion

Rose Bowl, L 32–41 vs. USC
- Conference: Big Ten Conference

Ranking
- Coaches: No. 7
- AP: No. 8
- Record: 10–2 (8–0 Big Ten)
- Head coach: Gary Barnett (4th season)
- Offensive coordinator: Greg Meyer (4th season)
- Defensive coordinator: Ron Vanderlinden (4th season)
- Captains: William Bennett; Rob Johnson; Sam Valenzisi
- Home stadium: Dyche Stadium

1995 Big Ten Conference football standings
| | Conf. | | | | | Overall |
| Team | W | | L | | T | W | | L | | T |
|---|---|---|---|---|---|---|---|---|---|---|
| No. 8 Northwestern $ | 8 | – | 0 | – | 0 | 10 | – | 2 | – | 0 |
| No. 6 Ohio State | 7 | – | 1 | – | 0 | 11 | – | 2 | – | 0 |
| No. 13 Penn State | 5 | – | 3 | – | 0 | 9 | – | 3 | – | 0 |
| No. 17 Michigan | 5 | – | 3 | – | 0 | 9 | – | 4 | – | 0 |
| Michigan State | 4 | – | 3 | – | 1 | 6 | – | 5 | – | 1 |
| No. 25 Iowa | 4 | – | 4 | – | 0 | 8 | – | 4 | – | 0 |
| Illinois | 3 | – | 4 | – | 1 | 5 | – | 5 | – | 1 |
| Wisconsin | 3 | – | 4 | – | 1 | 4 | – | 5 | – | 2 |
| Purdue | 2 | – | 5 | – | 1 | 4 | – | 6 | – | 1 |
| Minnesota | 1 | – | 7 | – | 0 | 3 | – | 8 | – | 0 |
| Indiana | 0 | – | 8 | – | 0 | 2 | – | 9 | – | 0 |
$ – Conference champion; Rankings from AP Poll

The 1995 Northwestern Wildcats football team represented Northwestern University in the 1995 NCAA Division I-A college football season. The 1995 season was a highly memorable one for the Northwestern program, as the Wildcats went 10–2 overall and 8–0 in the Big Ten Conference, earning their first winning season since 1971, their first conference championship since 1936, and their first 10-win season since 1903. They also broke several long-standing losing streaks to regular opponents, including a 22-game losing streak to Iowa, a 19-game losing streak against Michigan, and a 14-game losing streak to Notre Dame.

"Expect Victory" was the motto even as Northwestern began the season as 28-point underdogs against Notre Dame, whom they upset 17–15, propelling into the AP poll at #25. An upset loss to the Miami Redhawks in the second game of the season caused the Wildcats to drop out of the rankings. However, subsequent wins over ranked Michigan (19–13), Wisconsin (35–0), and Penn State (21–10) pushed the Wildcats into the top-10 while making them national media darlings.

Nine consecutive wins (including eight against Big Ten opponents) brought Northwestern their highest ranking since 1962 (#3), a conference title, and their first Rose Bowl appearance, and their first bowl appearance of any kind since 1949. In the Rose Bowl, the Wildcats' Cinderella season came to a conclusion with a 41–32 loss to the USC Trojans, and they finished the season at #8.

Northwestern was coached by Gary Barnett, who won multiple coach of the year awards for leading the dramatic turnaround of the program. Star players included the trio of quarterback Steve Schnur, running back Darnell Autry, and linebacker Pat Fitzgerald, who was named Big Ten and national defensive player of the year.

== Schedule ==
| Date | Time | Opponent | Rank | Site | TV | Result | Attendance |
|---|---|---|---|---|---|---|---|
| September 2 | 1:30 pm | at No. 9 Notre Dame* | | Notre Dame Stadium; Notre Dame, IN (rivalry) | NBC | W 17–15 | 59,075 |
| September 16 | 11:00 am | Miami (OH)* | No. 25 | Dyche Stadium; Evanston, IL | ESPN2 | L 28–30 | 26,352 |
| September 23 | 11:30 am | Air Force* | | Dyche Stadium; Evanston, IL | ESPN | W 30–6 | 26,037 |
| September 30 | 1:00 pm | Indiana | | Dyche Stadium; Evanston, IL | | W 31–7 | 29,223 |
| October 7 | 11:30 am | at No. 7 Michigan | No. 25 | Michigan Stadium; Ann Arbor, MI (rivalry) | ESPN | W 19–13 | 104,642 |
| October 14 | 1:00 pm | at Minnesota | No. 14 | Hubert H. Humphrey Metrodome; Minneapolis, MN | | W 27–17 | 50,504 |
| October 21 | 11:30 am | No. 24 Wisconsin^{†} | No. 11 | Dyche Stadium; Evanston, IL | ESPN2 | W 35–0 | 49,256 |
| October 28 | 11:00 am | at Illinois | No. 8 | Memorial Stadium; Champaign, IL (rivalry) | SCC | W 17–14 | 65,425 |
| November 4 | 2:30 pm | No. 12 Penn State | No. 6 | Dyche Stadium; Evanston, IL | ABC | W 21–10 | 49,256 |
| November 11 | 11:00 am | Iowa | No. 5 | Dyche Stadium; Evanston, IL (College GameDay) | Creative | W 31–20 | 49,256 |
| November 18 | 2:30 pm | at Purdue | No. 5 | Ross–Ade Stadium; West Lafayette, IN | ABC | W 23–8 | 47,172 |
| January 1 | 3:30 pm | vs. No. 17 USC* | No. 3 | Rose Bowl; Pasadena, CA (Rose Bowl) | ABC | L 32–41 | 100,102 |
*Non-conference game; ^{†}Homecoming; Rankings from AP Poll released prior to the game; All times are in Central time

== Roster ==
1995 Northwestern Wildcats football team roster
Players
Coaches
Offense

| Pos. | # | Name | Class |
|---|---|---|---|
| RB | 32 | Adrian Autry | So |
| RB | 24 | Darnell Autry | So |
| WR | 5 | D'Wayne Bates | Fr |
| WR | 86 | Dave Beazley | Jr |
| TE | 81 | Jon Burns | Jr |
| FB | 34 | Levelle Brown | Fr |
| G | 61 | Justin Chabot | Jr |
| TE | 83 | Darren Drexler | Sr |
| TE | 84 | Shane Graham | Sr |
| TE | 85 | Brian Harpring | Sr |
| FB | 46 | Matt Hartl | Jr |
| QB | 8 | Tim Hughes | Jr |
| OT | 74 | Paul Janus | Jr |
| C | 57 | Rob Johnson | Sr |
| OT | 78 | Brian Kardos | Sr |
| WR | 22 | Brian Musso | So |
| G | 75 | Ryan Padgett | Sr |
| G | 77 | Chad Pugh | Sr |
| QB | 10 | Steve Schnur | Jr |
| C | 63 | Nathan Strikwerda | Jr |
| WR | 25 | Jeff Swenson | So |

Defense

| Pos. | # | Name | Class |
|---|---|---|---|
| FS | 20 | William Bennett | Sr |
| SS | 33 | Eric Collier | Jr |
| DE | 36 | Casey Dailey | Jr |
| LB | 51 | Pat Fitzgerald (injured) | Jr |
| LB | 55 | Barry Gardner | Fr |
| LB | 53 | Don Holmes | Jr |
| CB | 3 | Hudhaifa Ismaeli | So |
| LB | 44 | Keith Lozowski | Jr |
| LB | 59 | BT Franklin | Sr |
| CB | 16 | Chris Martin | Sr |
| CB | 15 | Rodney Ray | Sr |
| DL | 89 | Larry Curry | Sr |
| DL | 94 | Joe Reiff | Jr |
| DT | 95 | Matt Rice | Jr |
| DL | 96 | Ray Robey | Jr |
| LB | 52 | Tim Scharf | Jr |
| LB | 47 | Geoff Shein | Sr |
| LB | 50 | Danny Sutter | Sr |

Special teams

| Pos. | # | Name | Class |
|---|---|---|---|
| P | 14 | Paul Burton | Jr |
| K | 13 | Brian Gowins | So |
| K | 27 | Sam Valenzisi (injured) (C) | Sr |

Head coach

- Gary Barnett

Coordinators/assistant coaches

- Ron Vanderlinden – Defensive coordinator
- Gregg Brandon – Wide receivers
- Jerry Brown – Defensive backs
- Jeff Genyk

Legend

- (C) Team captain
- (S) Suspended
- (I) Ineligible
- Injured
- Redshirt

== Rankings ==
Ranking movements Legend: ██ Increase in ranking ██ Decrease in ranking — = Not ranked
| | Week | | | | | | | | | | | | | | | | |
| Poll | Pre | 1 | 2 | 3 | 4 | 5 | 6 | 7 | 8 | 9 | 10 | 11 | 12 | 13 | 14 | 15 | Final |
|---|---|---|---|---|---|---|---|---|---|---|---|---|---|---|---|---|---|
| AP | — | — | — | 25 | — | — | 25 | 14 | 11 | 8 | 6 | 5 | 5 | 4 | 3 | 3 | 8 |
| Coaches | — | | — | — | — | — | — | 17 | 11 | 8 | 6 | 5 | 5 | 4 | 3 | 3 | 7 |

== Game summaries ==
=== Notre Dame ===
Northwestern Wildcats at #9 Notre Dame Fighting Irish

| Quarter | 1 | 2 | 3 | 4 | Total |
|---|---|---|---|---|---|
| Northwestern | 7 | 3 | 7 | 0 | 17 |
| Notre Dame | 0 | 9 | 0 | 6 | 15 |

at Notre Dame Stadium, Notre Dame, Indiana

- Date: September 2, 1995
- Game time: 1:30 p.m. CST
- Game attendance: 59,075
- TV announcers (NBC): Tom Hammond, Bob Trumpy, John Dockery
- Box Score

Game information

Scoring summary
| Q1 | 6:15 | NW | Dave Beazley 6-yard pass from Steve Schnur (Valenzisi kick) | NW 7–0 |
| Q2 | | ND | Kevin Kopka 35-yard field goal | NW 7–3 |
| Q2 | | NW | Sam Valenzisi 37-yard field goal | NW 10–3 |
| Q2 | 2:35 | ND | Robert Farmer 5-yard run (kick failed) | NW 10–9 |
| Q3 | | NW | D'Wayne Bates 26-yard pass from Steve Schnur (Valenzisi kick) | NW 17–9 |
| Q4 | 6:15 | ND | Randy Kinder 2-yard run (conversion failed) | NW 17–15 |

=== Miami (OH) ===
The Wildcats surrendered a 21-point 4th quarter lead in their first game as a nationally ranked team since 1971. Miami of Ohio's Chad Seitz booted a 20-yard field goal as time expired to give the Redskins the victory. The opposing team was led by future Northwestern head coach Randy Walker and his offensive coordinator was Sean Payton. This would be the lone regular season blemish on the Wildcats' schedule.

Miami (OH) Redskins at #25 Northwestern Wildcats

| Quarter | 1 | 2 | 3 | 4 | Total |
|---|---|---|---|---|---|
| Miami (OH) | 0 | 7 | 0 | 23 | 30 |
| Northwestern | 14 | 7 | 7 | 0 | 28 |

at Dyche Stadium, Evanston, Illinois

- Date: September 16, 1995
- Game time: 11:00 a.m. CST
- Game attendance: 26,352
- Box Score

Game information

Scoring summary
| Q1 | 10:50 | NW | D'Wayne Bates 27-yard pass from Steve Schnur (Valenzisi kick) | NW 7–0 |
| Q1 | 3:40 | NW | Darnell Autry 13-yard pass from Steve Schnur (Valenzisi kick) | NW 14–0 |
| Q2 | 4:06 | NW | D'Wayne Bates 36-yard pass from Steve Schnur (Valenzisi kick) | NW 21–0 |
| Q2 | 1:55 | M-OH | Dee Osborne 5-yard blocked punt return (Seitz kick) | NW 21–7 |
| Q3 | 14:09 | NW | Rodney Ray 20-yard interception return (Valenzisi kick) | NW 28–7 |
| Q4 | 11:14 | M-OH | Jay Hall 5-yard pass from Sam Ricketts (Seitz kick) | NW 28–14 |
| Q4 | 8:36 | M-OH | Jeremy Adkins 9-yard pass from Sam Ricketts (Seitz kick) | NW 28–21 |
| Q4 | 2:22 | M-OH | Ty King 2-yard run (conversion failed) | NW 28–27 |
| Q4 | 0:00 | M-OH | Chad Seitz 20-yard field goal | MIAMI 30–28 |

=== Air Force ===
Air Force Falcons at Northwestern Wildcats

| Quarter | 1 | 2 | 3 | 4 | Total |
|---|---|---|---|---|---|
| Air Force | 0 | 6 | 0 | 0 | 6 |
| Northwestern | 10 | 6 | 0 | 14 | 30 |

at Dyche Stadium, Evanston, Illinois

- Date: September 23, 1995
- Game time: 11:30 a.m. CST
- Game attendance: 26,037

Game information

Scoring summary
| Q1 | 7:21 | NW | Sam Valenzisi 46-yard field goal | NW 3–0 |
| Q1 | 4:19 | NW | Darnell Autry 1-yard run (Valenzisi kick) | NW 10–0 |
| Q2 | 13:09 | AF | Randy Roberts 26-yard field goal | NW 10–3 |
| Q2 | 9:36 | NW | Sam Valenzisi 26-yard field goal | NW 13–3 |
| Q2 | 7:16 | NW | Sam Valenzisi 35-yard field goal | NW 16–3 |
| Q2 | 0:31 | AF | Randy Roberts 39-yard field goal | NW 16–6 |
| Q4 | 14:57 | NW | Darnell Autry 6-yard run (Valenzisi kick) | NW 23–6 |
| Q4 | 8:37 | NW | Adrian Autry 5-yard run (Valenzisi kick) | NW 30–6 |

=== Indiana ===
Indiana Hoosiers at Northwestern Wildcats

| Quarter | 1 | 2 | 3 | 4 | Total |
|---|---|---|---|---|---|
| Indiana | 0 | 7 | 0 | 0 | 7 |
| Northwestern | 3 | 7 | 11 | 10 | 31 |

at Dyche Stadium, Evanston, Illinois

- Date: September 30, 1995
- Game time: 1:00 p.m. CST
- Game attendance: 29,223

Game information

Scoring summary
| Q1 | 0:01 | NW | Sam Valenzisi 40-yard field goal | NW 3–0 |
| Q2 | 9:26 | IND | Chris Dittoe 2-yard run (Manolopoulos kick) | Indiana 7–3 |
| Q2 | 5:27 | NW | Darnell Autry 42-yard run (Valenzisi kick) | NW 10–7 |
| Q3 | 7:04 | NW | Sam Valenzisi 34-yard field goal | NW 13–7 |
| Q3 | 4:24 | NW | Darnell Autry 6-yard run (Beazley pass from Schnur) | NW 21–7 |
| Q4 | 9:06 | NW | Casey Dailey 43-yard fumble return (Valenzisi kick) | NW 28–7 |
| Q4 | 6:30 | NW | Sam Valenzisi 32-yard field goal | NW 31–7 |

=== Michigan ===
#25 Northwestern Wildcats at #7 Michigan Wolverines

| Quarter | 1 | 2 | 3 | 4 | Total |
|---|---|---|---|---|---|
| Northwestern | 0 | 6 | 3 | 10 | 19 |
| Michigan | 3 | 3 | 7 | 0 | 13 |

at Michigan Stadium, Ann Arbor, Michigan

- Date: October 7, 1995
- Game time: 11:30 a.m. CST
- Game attendance: 104,642
- TV: ESPN
- Box Score

Game information

Scoring summary
| Q1 | 9:33 | Mich | Remy Hamilton 41-yard field goal | Mich 3–0 |
| Q2 | 12:43 | Mich | Remy Hamilton 21-yard field goal | Mich 6–0 |
| Q2 | 4:15 | NW | Sam Valenzisi 29-yard field goal | Mich 6–3 |
| Q2 | 0:01 | NW | Sam Valenzisi 28-yard field goal | Tied 6–6 |
| Q3 | 8:02 | Mich | Brian Griese 3-yard run (Hamilton kick) | Mich 13–6 |
| Q3 | 3:48 | NW | Sam Valenzisi 32-yard field goal | Mich 13–9 |
| Q4 | 12:42 | NW | Matt Hartl 2-yard pass from Steve Schnur (Valenzisi kick) | NW 16–13 |
| Q4 | 8:42 | NW | Sam Valenzisi 22-yard field goal | NW 19–13 |

=== Minnesota ===
After falling behind 14–3 early in the second quarter, the Wildcats scored the next 24 points to take control of the game. Darnell Autry ran for 169 yards and 3 touchdowns, including a 73-yard burst early in the fourth quarter.

#14 Northwestern Wildcats at Minnesota Golden Gophers

| Quarter | 1 | 2 | 3 | 4 | Total |
|---|---|---|---|---|---|
| Northwestern | 3 | 11 | 7 | 6 | 27 |
| Minnesota | 7 | 7 | 0 | 3 | 17 |

at Hubert H. Humphrey Metrodome, Minneapolis, Minnesota

- Date: October 14, 1995
- Game time: 1:00 p.m. CST
- Game attendance: 50,504
- Box Score

Game information

Scoring summary
| Q1 | 3:49 | NW | Sam Valenzisi 29-yard field goal | NW 3–0 |
| Q1 | 0:30 | Minn | Paul Kratochvil 4-yard pass from Cory Sauter (Chalberg kick) | Minn 7–3 |
| Q2 | 13:08 | Minn | Chris Darkins 6-yard run (Chalberg kick) | Minn 14–3 |
| Q2 | 9:47 | NW | Sam Valenzisi 29-yard field goal | Minn 14–6 |
| Q2 | 5:42 | NW | Darnell Autry 18-yard run (D'Wayne Bates pass from Steve Schnur) | Tied 14–14 |
| Q3 | 3:57 | NW | Darnell Autry 11-yard run (Valenzisi kick) | NW 21–14 |
| Q4 | 12:21 | NW | Darnell Autry 73-yard run (Valenzisi kick) | NW 27–14 |
| Q4 | 8:51 | Minn | Mike Chalberg 47-yard field goal | NW 27–17 |

=== Wisconsin ===
The Wildcats forced 7 Badger turnovers (Wisconsin had 6 total in their first five games) in a triumphant homecoming matchup. The game marked the first sellout at Northwestern since 1984.

#24 Wisconsin Badgers at #11 Northwestern Wildcats

| Quarter | 1 | 2 | 3 | 4 | Total |
|---|---|---|---|---|---|
| Wisconsin | 0 | 0 | 0 | 0 | 0 |
| Northwestern | 10 | 3 | 6 | 16 | 35 |

at Dyche Stadium, Evanston, Illinois

- Date: October 21, 1995
- Game time: 11:30 a.m. CST
- Game attendance: 49,256
- TV: ESPN2
- Box Score

Game information

Scoring summary
| Q1 | 7:22 | NW | Steve Schnur 1-yard run (Valenzisi kick) | NW 7–0 |
| Q2 | 2:39 | NW | Sam Valenzisi 32-yard field goal | NW 10–0 |
| Q2 | 0:56 | NW | Sam Valenzisi 26-yard field goal | NW 13–0 |
| Q3 | 13:21 | NW | Darnell Autry 32-yard pass from Steve Schnur (conversion failed) | NW 19–0 |
| Q4 | 13:34 | NW | Darnell Autry 3-yard run (Valenzisi kick) | NW 26–0 |
| Q4 | 11:03 | NW | Brian Gowins 40-yard field goal | NW 29–0 |
| Q4 | 7:29 | NW | Levelle Brown 38-yard run (PAT failed) | NW 35–0 |

=== Illinois ===
#8 Northwestern Wildcats at Illinois Fighting Illini

| Quarter | 1 | 2 | 3 | 4 | Total |
|---|---|---|---|---|---|
| Northwestern | 0 | 10 | 0 | 7 | 17 |
| Illinois | 7 | 7 | 0 | 0 | 14 |

at Memorial Stadium, Champaign, Illinois

- Date: October 28, 1995
- Game time: 11:00 a.m. CST
- Game attendance: 65,425
- TV: SCC

Game information

Scoring summary
| Q1 | 9:41 | ILL | Weaver 1-yard run (Scheuplein kick) | Ill 7–0 |
| Q2 | 10:32 | ILL | Robert Holcombe 7-yard run (Scheuplein kick) | Ill 14–0 |
| Q2 | 8:12 | NW | Brian Gowins 49-yard field goal | Ill 14–3 |
| Q2 | 4:33 | NW | D'Wayne Bates 43-yard pass from Steve Schnur (Gowins kick) | Ill 14–10 |
| Q4 | 6:14 | NW | Darnell Autry 1-yard run (Gowins kick) | NW 17–14 |

=== Penn State ===
#12 Penn State Nittany Lions at #6 Northwestern Wildcats

| Quarter | 1 | 2 | 3 | 4 | Total |
|---|---|---|---|---|---|
| Penn State | 0 | 7 | 3 | 0 | 10 |
| Northwestern | 7 | 7 | 0 | 7 | 21 |

at Dyche Stadium, Evanston, Illinois

- Date: November 4, 1995
- Game time: 2:30 p.m. CST
- Game attendance: 49,256
- TV announcers (ABC): Keith Jackson, Bob Griese, and Lynn Swann
- Box Score

Game information

Scoring summary
| Q1 | 8:47 | NW | Darnell Autry 2-yard run (Gowins kick) | NW 7–0 |
| Q2 | 8:07 | NW | Darnell Autry 11-yard run (Gowins kick) | NW 14–0 |
| Q2 | 0:48 | PSU | Olsommer 5-yard pass from Richardson (Conway kick) | NW 14–7 |
| Q3 | 8:32 | PSU | Conway 24-yard field goal | NW 14–10 |
| Q4 | 11:03 | NW | Darnell Autry 1-yard run (Gowins kick) | NW 21–10 |

=== Iowa ===
Iowa Hawkeyes at #5 Northwestern Wildcats

| Quarter | 1 | 2 | 3 | 4 | Total |
|---|---|---|---|---|---|
| Iowa | 0 | 20 | 0 | 0 | 20 |
| Northwestern | 3 | 14 | 7 | 7 | 31 |

at Dyche Stadium, Evanston, Illinois

- Date: November 11, 1995
- Game time: 11:00 a.m. CST
- Game weather: 26 °F (−3 °C), Overcast, Wind N 30 mph (48 km/h)
- Game attendance: 49,256
- Referee: David Witvoet
- TV announcers (Creative Sports): Wayne Larrivee, Randy Wright, and Jim Barber
- Box Score

Game information

Scoring summary
| 1 | 6:24 | NW | Brian Gowins 50-yard field goal | NW 3–0 |
| 2 | 13:03 | IOWA | Sedrick Shaw 1-yard run (Bromert kick) | IOWA 7–3 |
| 2 | 8:25 | IOWA | Tom Knight 28-yard interception return (Bromert kick) | IOWA 14–3 |
| 2 | 6:44 | NW | Darren Drexler 21-yard pass from Steve Schnur (Gowins kick) | IOWA 14–10 |
| 2 | 5:05 | NW | Brian Musso 60-yard punt return (Gowins kick) | NW 17–14 |
| 2 | 1:31 | IOWA | Scott Slutzker 39-yard pass from Matt Sherman (kick failed) | IOWA 20–17 |
| 3 | 11:08 | NW | Darnell Autry 3-yard run (Gowins kick) | NW 24–20 |
| 4 | 2:56 | NW | Hudhaifa Ismaeli 31-yard fumble return (Gowins kick) | NW 31–20 |

=== Purdue ===
Northwestern got two big scoring plays in the first half – a 76-yard interception return for a touchdown by Chris Martin and a 72-yard touchdown reception by D'Wayne Bates – to take control. Darnell Autry carried the ball 32 times for a career-high 226 yards.

#5 Northwestern Wildcats at Purdue Boilermakers

| Quarter | 1 | 2 | 3 | 4 | Total |
|---|---|---|---|---|---|
| Northwestern | 7 | 7 | 9 | 0 | 23 |
| Purdue | 0 | 0 | 0 | 8 | 8 |

at Ross–Ade Stadium, West Lafayette, Indiana

- Date: November 18, 1995
- Game time: 2:30 p.m. CST
- Game attendance: 47,172
- TV: ABC
- Box Score

Game information

Scoring summary
| Q1 | 7:47 | NW | Chris Martin 76-yard interception return (Gowins kick) | NW 7–0 |
| Q2 | 3:10 | NW | D'Wayne Bates 72-yard pass from Steve Schnur (Gowins kick) | NW 14–0 |
| Q3 | 13:53 | NW | Safety | NW 16–0 |
| Q3 | 13:38 | NW | Steve Schnur 1-yard run (Gowins kick) | NW 23–0 |
| Q4 | 10:30 | PUR | Watson 3-yard run (Alstott reception) | NW 23–8 |

=== Rose Bowl ===
#3 Northwestern Wildcats vs. #17 USC Trojans

| Quarter | 1 | 2 | 3 | 4 | Total |
|---|---|---|---|---|---|
| Northwestern | 7 | 3 | 16 | 6 | 32 |
| USC | 7 | 17 | 7 | 10 | 41 |

at Rose Bowl, Pasadena, California

- Date: January 1, 1996
- Game time: 4:00 p.m. CST
- Game attendance: 100,102
- Referee: Randy Christal
- TV announcers (ABC): Keith Jackson, Bob Griese, and Lynn Swann
- Box Score

Game information

Scoring summary
| Q1 | 10:02 | USC | Lavale Woods 1-yard run (Abrams kick) | USC 7–0 |
| Q1 | 6:05 | NW | Darnell Autry 3-yard run (Gowins kick) | Tied 7–7 |
| Q2 | 13:05 | USC | Terry Barnum 21-yard pass from Brad Otton (Abrams kick) | USC 14–7 |
| Q2 | 3:29 | USC | Adam Abrams 30-yard field goal | USC 17–7 |
| Q2 | 2:56 | USC | Daylon McCutcheon 53-yard fumble return (Abrams kick) | USC 24–7 |
| Q2 | 0:02 | NW | Brian Gowins 29-yard field goal | USC 24–10 |
| Q3 | 11:01 | NW | Brian Gowins 28-yard field goal | USC 24–13 |
| Q3 | 8:17 | NW | Darnell Autry 3-yard run (conversion failed) | USC 24–19 |
| Q2 | 6:08 | USC | Keyshawn Johnson 56-yard pass from Brad Otton (Abrams kick) | USC 31–19 |
| Q3 | 2:58 | NW | Steve Schnur 1-yard run (Gowins kick) | USC 31–26 |
| Q4 | 13:01 | NW | Darnell Autry 2-yard run (conversion failed) | NW 32–31 |
| Q4 | 9:09 | USC | Adam Abrams 46-yard field goal | USC 34–32 |
| Q4 | 2:55 | USC | Delon Washington 2-yard run (Abrams kick) | USC 41–32 |

== Awards and honors ==
- Head coach Gary Barnett: Paul "Bear" Bryant Award, Walter Camp Coach of the Year, Big Ten Coach of the Year
- Linebacker Pat Fitzgerald: Chuck Bednarik Award, Bronko Nagurski Trophy, Big Ten Defensive Player of the Year

== 1995 team players in the NFL ==
- Darnell Autry
- D'Wayne Bates
