= 1995 Oregon Ducks football team =

American college football season

1995 Oregon Ducks football

Cotton Bowl, L 6–38 vs. Colorado
- Conference: Pacific-10 Conference

Ranking
- Coaches: No. 18
- AP: No. 18
- Record: 9–3 (6–2 Pac-10)
- Head coach: Mike Bellotti (1st season)
- Offensive coordinator: Al Borges (1st season)
- Offensive scheme: Pro-style
- Defensive coordinator: Charlie Waters (1st season)
- Base defense: 4–3
- Captain: Game captains
- Home stadium: Autzen Stadium

1995 Pacific-10 Conference football standings
	Conf.					Overall
Team	W		L		T	W		L		T
No. 12 USC ^ +	6	–	1	–	1	9	–	2	–	1
Washington +	6	–	1	–	1	7	–	4	–	1
No. 18 Oregon	6	–	2	–	0	9	–	3	–	0
Stanford	5	–	3	–	0	7	–	4	–	1
UCLA	4	–	4	–	0	7	–	5	–	0
Arizona	4	–	4	–	0	6	–	5	–	0
Arizona State	4	–	4	–	0	6	–	5	–	0
California	2	–	6	–	0	3	–	8	–	0
Washington State	2	–	6	–	0	3	–	8	–	0
Oregon State	0	–	8	–	0	1	–	10	–	0
+ – Conference co-champions; ^ – Rose Bowl representative per tie-breaking rules based on overall record, due to Washington-USC tie; Rankings from AP Poll

The 1995 Oregon Ducks football team represented the University of Oregon as a member of the Pacific-10 Conference (Pac-10) during the 1995 NCAA Division I-A football season. Led by first-year head coach Mike Bellotti, the Ducks compiled an overall record of 9–3 with a mark of 6–2 in conference play, placing third in the Pac-10. Oregon was invited to the Cotton Bowl, where the Ducks lost to Colorado. The team played home games at Autzen Stadium in Eugene, Oregon.

Bellotti replaced Rich Brooks, who resigned in February 1995 to become the head coach for the St. Louis Rams of the National Football League (NFL).

== Schedule ==
Date	Time	Opponent	Rank	Site	TV	Result	Attendance
September 2	6:00 pm	at Utah*		Robert Rice Stadium; Salt Lake City, UT	OSN	W 27–20	30,701
September 9	7:00 pm	Illinois*	No. 24	Autzen Stadium; Eugene, OR	Prime	W 34–31	44,201
September 16	12:30 pm	at No. 12 UCLA	No. 20	Rose Bowl; Pasadena, CA	ABC	W 38–31	42,537
September 23	3:30 pm	Stanford	No. 12	Autzen Stadium; Eugene, OR (rivalry)	OSN	L 21–28	45,237
October 7	1:00 pm	Pacific (CA)*	No. 17	Autzen Stadium; Eugene, OR		W 45–7	38,736
October 14	3:30 pm	at California	No. 15	California Memorial Stadium; Berkeley, CA	Prime	W 52–30	31,000
October 21	7:00 pm	Washington State	No. 12	Autzen Stadium; Eugene, OR	Prime	W 26–7	46,109
October 28	1:00 pm	Arizona State	No. 10	Autzen Stadium; Eugene, OR		L 24–35	44,772
November 4	12:30 pm	at No. 15 Washington	No. 19	Husky Stadium; Seattle, WA (rivalry)		W 24–22	74,054
November 11	12:30 pm	at Arizona	No. 17	Arizona Stadium; Tucson, AZ	ABC	W 17–13	53,736
November 18	3:30 pm	Oregon State	No. 16	Autzen Stadium; Eugene, OR (Civil War)	Prime	W 12–10	46,114
January 1	10:30 am	vs. No. 7 Colorado*	No. 12	Cotton Bowl; Dallas, TX (Cotton Bowl)	CBS	L 6–38	58,214
*Non-conference game; Rankings from AP Poll released prior to the game; All times are in Pacific time
