= 1995 Liberty Bowl =

1995 St. Jude Liberty Bowl
- 37th Liberty Bowl
Stanford Cardinal	East Carolina Pirates
(7–3–1)	(8–3)
Pac-10	Independent
13	19
Head coach: Tyrone Willingham	Head coach: Steve Logan
	1	2	3	4	Total
Stanford	0	7	6	0	13
East Carolina	7	9	0	3	19
- Date: December 30, 1995
- Season: 1995
- Stadium: Liberty Bowl Memorial Stadium
- Location: Memphis, Tennessee
- MVP: Kwame Ellis (CB, Stanford)
- Referee: Courtney Mauzy (ACC)
- Attendance: 47,398

United States TV coverage
- Network: ESPN
- Announcers: Bob Carpenter and Mike Mayock

The 1995 Liberty Bowl (December) game was a college football bowl game played on December 30, 1995, at Liberty Bowl Memorial Stadium in Memphis, Tennessee. The 37th edition of the Liberty Bowl, it featured the Stanford Cardinal and the East Carolina Pirates.

Although East Carolina did not reach the end zone on offense—they scored on four field goals and an interception return for a touchdown—that effort, combined with strong defense, was enough to defeat Stanford, 19–13. The Cardinal scored the game's only offensive touchdown, while cornerback Kwame Ellis returned a blocked punt for touchdown and was named the game's MVP in a losing effort.

== Teams ==
=== Stanford ===
Led by first-year coach Tyrone Willingham who replaced Bill Walsh, the Cardinal had been expected to finish last in the Pac-10; instead, the team finished with a 7–3–1 record, good enough for fourth in the conference. Stanford was led offensively by quarterback Mark Butterfield, who had thrown for over 2,500 yards and 19 touchdowns during the season and running back Anthony Bookman, who had run for 900 yards.

=== East Carolina ===
East Carolina was led by fourth-year head coach Steve Logan. The Pirates were returning to the Liberty Bowl for the second-straight year after having been blown out 30–0 in the 1994 Liberty Bowl. East Carolina was led by quarterback Marcus Crandell, who had thrown for over 2,700 yards and 18 touchdowns and as a junior, was already East Carolina's all-time passing and offensive yardage leader.

== Game summary ==
Despite the offensive credentials of both teams, the game turned out to showcase the defenses of both teams. Stanford took the opening kickoff into East Carolina territory before the drive failed. On its next possession, Stanford appeared to be driving again, but Butterfield's pass was intercepted by Daren Hart, who raced 39 yards for a touchdown. Early in the second quarter, Pirate kicker Chad Holcomb kicked a 46-yard field goal. Stanford finally scored on an Adam Salina one-yard plunge to cut the lead to 10–7, but two Holcomb field goals in the last 2:01 of the half made the halftime score 16–7.

Early in the second half, Stanford cornerback Kwame Ellis blocked a punt and returned it for a touchdown to make the score 16–13 after the missed PAT, but could get no closer as the Pirate defense kept Stanford off-balance all day, holding Butterfield to just 139 passing yards and Bookman to only 46 rushing yards. A fourth Holcomb field goal sealed the victory for East Carolina.

Ellis, who had blocked the punt and contributed to a defensive effort that did not allow any East Carolina offensive touchdowns, was named the game's MVP in a losing effort.

=== Scoring ===
==== First quarter ====
- East Carolina - Daren Hart 39-yard interception return (Chad Holcomb kick)

==== Second quarter ====
- East Carolina- Holcomb 46-yard field goal
- Stanford - Adam Salina 1-yard run (Eric Abrams kick)
- East Carolina- Holcomb 26-yard field goal
- East Carolina- Holcomb 41-yard field goal

==== Third quarter ====
- Stanford - Kwame Ellis 2-yard return after blocked punt (Abrams kick failed)

==== Fourth quarter ====
- East Carolina- Holcomb 34-yard field goal

== Aftermath ==
Willingham would remain at Stanford for seven seasons, eventually winning the conference championship and taking the team to the 2000 Rose Bowl, the team's first Rose Bowl since 1972. He left to become coach of Notre Dame in 2002.

East Carolina would move into the top 25 after this game, which ended Logan's most successful season at East Carolina where he coached until 2002. Quarterback Crandall had a successful career in the Canadian Football League, winning the Grey Cup Most Valuable Player in 2001 as quarterback of the Calgary Stampeders.
