= 1995 Washington Huskies football team =

American college football season

1995 Washington Huskies football

Pac-10 co-champion

Sun Bowl, L 18–38 vs. Iowa
- Conference: Pacific-10 Conference
- Record: 7–4–1 (6–1–1 Pac-10)
- Head coach: Jim Lambright (3rd season)
- Offensive coordinator: Bill Diedrick (2nd season)
- Defensive coordinator: Randy Hart (1st season)
- MVP: Damon Huard
- Captains: Ernie Conwell; Deke Devers; Stephen Hoffmann; Richard Thomas
- Home stadium: Husky Stadium

1995 Pacific-10 Conference football standings
	Conf.					Overall
Team	W		L		T	W		L		T
No. 12 USC ^ +	6	–	1	–	1	9	–	2	–	1
Washington +	6	–	1	–	1	7	–	4	–	1
No. 18 Oregon	6	–	2	–	0	9	–	3	–	0
Stanford	5	–	3	–	0	7	–	4	–	1
UCLA	4	–	4	–	0	7	–	5	–	0
Arizona	4	–	4	–	0	6	–	5	–	0
Arizona State	4	–	4	–	0	6	–	5	–	0
California	2	–	6	–	0	3	–	8	–	0
Washington State	2	–	6	–	0	3	–	8	–	0
Oregon State	0	–	8	–	0	1	–	10	–	0
+ – Conference co-champions; ^ – Rose Bowl representative per tie-breaking rules based on overall record, due to Washington-USC tie; Rankings from AP Poll

The 1995 Washington Huskies football team was an American football team that represented the University of Washington during the 1995 NCAA Division I-A football season. In its third season under head coach Jim Lambright, the team compiled a 7–4–1 record, finished in a tie with USC for first place in the Pacific-10 Conference, and outscored opponents 312 to 280.

Quarterback Damon Huard was selected as the team's most valuable player. Ernie Conwell, Deke Devers, Stephen Hoffmann, and Richard Thomas were the team captains. After two years of bowl probation, the Huskies returned to the postseason at the Sun Bowl, but fell to Iowa.

The Huskies' helmet color was changed to purple this year; it returned to metallic gold in 1999. The AstroTurf of Husky Stadium was replaced prior to the 1995 season; it was replaced with infilled FieldTurf in 2000.

== Schedule ==
Date	Time	Opponent	Rank	Site	TV	Result	Attendance
September 2	12:30 p.m.	Arizona State	No. 22	Husky Stadium; Seattle, WA	ABC	W 23–20	73,129
September 16	12:30 p.m.	at No. 10 Ohio State*	No. 18	Ohio Stadium; Columbus, OH	ABC	L 20–30	94,104
September 23	12:30 p.m.	Army*	No. 22	Husky Stadium; Seattle, WA		W 21–13	76,125
September 30	1:00 p.m.	at Oregon State	No. 18	Parker Stadium; Corvallis, OR		W 26–16	32,989
October 7	12:30 p.m.	No. 23 Notre Dame*	No. 15	Husky Stadium; Seattle, WA	ABC	L 21–29	74,023
October 14	2:00 p.m.	at No. 16 Stanford	No. 24	Stanford Stadium; Stanford, CA		W 38–28	45,210
October 21	7:00 p.m.	at Arizona	No. 20	Arizona Stadium; Tucson, AZ		W 31–17	58,471
October 28	12:30 p.m.	No. 13 USC	No. 17	Husky Stadium; Seattle, WA	ABC	T 21–21	74,421
November 4	12:30 p.m.	No. 19 Oregon	No. 15	Husky Stadium; Seattle, WA (rivalry)		L 22–24	74,054
November 11	12:30 p.m.	at UCLA	No. 22	Rose Bowl; Pasadena, CA		W 38–14	50,104
November 18	12:30 p.m.	Washington State	No. 22	Husky Stadium; Seattle, WA (Apple Cup)	ABC	W 33–30	74,144
December 29	11:30 a.m.	vs. Iowa*	No. 20	Sun Bowl; El Paso, TX (Sun Bowl)	CBS	L 18–38	49,116
*Non-conference game; Rankings from AP Poll released prior to the game; All times are in Pacific time

== Game summaries ==
=== Ohio State ===
Washington Huskies at Ohio State Buckeyes

Quarter	1	2	3	4	Total
Washington	7	0	0	13	20
Ohio State	9	14	7	0	30

at Ohio Stadium, Columbus, Ohio

- Date: September 16, 1995
- Game time: 3:30 p.m.
- Game weather: Overcast, 68 °F (20 °C), Wind SSW 10-15
- Game attendance: 94,104
- Referee: Jim Kemerling
- Box Score

Game information

First quarter

- OSU - Nicky Sualua 22-yard pass from Bobby Hoying (kick blocked)
- WASH - Rashaan Shehee 10-yard run (John Wales kick)
- OSU - Josh Jackson 19-yard field goal

Second quarter

- OSU - Terry Glenn 6-yard pass from Bobby Hoying (Josh Jackson kick)
- OSU - Eddie George 7-yard run (Josh Jackson kick)

Third quarter

- OSU - Eddie George 16-yard run (Josh Jackson kick)

Fourth quarter

- WASH - Fred Coleman 31-yard pass from Shane Fortney (run failed)
- WASH - Leon Neal 7-yard pass from Damon Huard (John Wales kick)

Top passers

- OSU - Bobby Hoying - 18/26, 92 yards, 2 TDs, 1 int
- WASH - Damon Huard - 19/26, 192 yards, 1 TD, 1 int

Top rushers

- OSU - Eddie George - 36 rushes, 212 yards, 2 TDs
- WASH - Leon Neal - 15 rushes, 135 yards

Top receivers

- OSU - Terry Glenn - 7 receptions, 91 yards, 1 TD
- WASH - Conwell - 3 receptions, 60 yards

=== Notre Dame ===
#23 Notre Dame Fighting Irish at #15 Washington Huskies

Quarter	1	2	3	4	Total
Notre Dame	7	0	0	22	29
Washington	7	0	7	7	21

at Husky Stadium, West Lafayette, Indiana

- Date: October 7, 1995
- Game time: 3:30 p.m. EST
- Game attendance: 74,023
- Box Score

Game information
First quarter
- ND - Mayes 10 pass from Powlus (Kopka kick)
- UW - Shehee 1 run (Wales kick)

Second quarter

- No scoring

Third quarter

- UW - Desaussure 13 pass from D. Huard (Wales kick)

Fourth quarter

- ND - Mayes 30 pass from Powlus (Kopka kick)
- UW - Shehee 22 run (Wales kick)
- ND - A. Denson 7 run (Mayes reception for two-point conversion)
- ND - A. Rossum 77 interception return (Kopka kick)

=== 1995 Sun Bowl ===
Iowa Hawkeyes vs. #20 Washington Huskies

Quarter	1	2	3	4	Total
Iowa	10	11	10	7	38
Washington	0	0	6	12	18

at Sun Bowl, El Paso, Texas

- Date: December 29, 1995
- Game attendance: 49,116
- TV announcers (CBS): Jim Nantz, Terry Donahue, and Michele Tafoya

Game information
First quarter
- IOWA - Sedrick Shaw 58-yard run (Zach Bromert kick) IOWA 7–0
- IOWA - Brion Hurley 49-yard field goal IOWA 10–0

Second quarter

- IOWA - Safety IOWA 12–0
- IOWA - Zach Bromert 33-yard field goal IOWA 15–0
- IOWA - Zach Bromert 34-yard field goal IOWA 18–0
- IOWA - Brion Hurley 47-yard field goal IOWA 21–0

Third quarter

- IOWA - Brion Hurley 50-yard field goal IOWA 24–0
- WASH - Jerome Pathon 30-yard pass from Shane Fortney (two-point conversion failed) IOWA 24-6
- IOWA - Michael Burger 8-yard run (Zach Bromert kick) IOWA 31–6

Fourth quarter

- IOWA - Michael Burger 1-yard run (Zach Bromert kick) IOWA 38–6
- WASH - Fred Coleman 10-yard pass from Damon Huard (two-point conversion failed) IOWA 38–12
- WASH - Ernie Conwell 20-yard pass from Damon Huard (two-point conversion failed) IOWA 38–18

== Roster ==
1995 Washington Huskies football team roster
Players
Coaches
Offense

Pos.	#	Name	Class
OT	70	Eric Battle	Sr
TE	88	Jeremy Brigham	So
TE	85	Cameron Cleeland	So
WR	22	Fred Coleman	So
TE	82	Ernie Conwell (C)	Sr
QB	15	Shane Fortney	So
C	79	Trevor Highfield	Sr
QB	16	Brock Huard	Fr
QB	7	Damon Huard	Sr
G	54	Patrick Kesi	Sr
C	77	Olin Kreutz	Fr
SE	19	Dave Janoski	Jr
RB	12	Leon Neal	Sr
G	75	Benji Olson	Fr
WR	24	Jerome Pathon	So
OT	72	Bob Sapp	Jr
RB	1	Rashaan Shehee	So
FB	30	Richard Thomas (C)	Sr
TE	91	John Tubbs II	Fr

Defense

Pos.	#	Name	Class
LB	54	Ink Aleaga	Jr
DE	46	Jason Chorak	So
LB	23	Reggie Davis	Fr
LB	43	Deke Devers (C)	Sr
LB	57	John Fiala	Jr
CB	10	Scott Greenlaw	Sr
LB	40	Jerry Jensen	So
DT	91	Stephen Hoffman (C)	Sr
ROV	20	Ikaika Malloe	Jr
SS	9	Lawyer Milloy	Jr
FS	7	Tony Parrish	So
CB	4	Reggie Reser	Sr
NT	97	David Richie	Jr
DT	67	Sekou Wiggs	So

Special teams

Pos.	#	Name	Class
P	14	Geoff Prince	Jr
PK	18	John Wales	Jr

Head coach

- Jim Lambright (3rd year)

Coordinators/assistant coaches

- Randy Hart (AHC, DC, DL)
- Bill Diedrick (OC, QB)
- Dick Baird (LB)
- Phil Elmassian (S)
- Al Lavan (RB)
- Scott Linehan (WR)
- Rick Mallory (TE)
- Ron Milus (CB)
- Steve Morton (OL)

Legend

- (C) Team captain
- (S) Suspended
- (I) Ineligible
- Injured
- Redshirt

== NFL draft ==
Three Huskies were selected in the 1996 NFL draft, which was seven rounds, with 254 selections.

Player	Position	Round	Pick	NFL club
Lawyer Milloy	SS	2	36	New England Patriots
Ernie Conwell	TE	2	59	St. Louis Rams
Leon Neal	RB	6	196	Buffalo Bills

Quarterback Damon Huard no drafted, but played 12 seasons in the NFL.
