= Kyle Wachholtz =

American gridiron football player (born 1972)

No. 7
- Positions: Quarterback; Tight end

Personal information
- Born: May 17, 1972 (age 54); Norco, California, U.S.

Career information
- College: USC
- NFL draft: 1996: 7th round, 240th overall pick

Career history
- Green Bay Packers (1996–1998)

Awards and highlights
- Super Bowl champion (XXXI)

Kyle Wachholtz (born May 17, 1972) is an American former professional football player who was a quarterback and tight end. He was selected by the Green Bay Packers in the seventh round of the 1996 NFL draft. Wachholtz won Super Bowl XXXI with the Packers. He played college football for the USC Trojans.

== College career ==
Attending USC, Wachholtz recorded 13 career touchdown passes against 4 interceptions, he had a college QBR of 139.2. After being academically ineligible to play at points of his career, Wachholtz split time with Brad Otton as a senior. Wachholtz was the more physical quarterback of the two. However, Wachholtz did not play a single snap in the 1996 Rose Bowl.

== Professional career ==
Wachholtz was selected by the Green Bay Packers in the 1996 NFL draft (seventh round, 240th overall). He was cut by the Packers in 1996 final cuts. On the practice squad later that year, he was converted to a tight end by the Packers. He was promoted to the active roster for Super Bowl XXXI. After a back injury while playing on the practice squad in 1997, he was cut by the Packers in mid-1998. He then tried to play with the Barcelona Dragons of NFL Europe, but failed his physical.

== Post-career life ==
Wachholtz re-enrolled at USC after ending his playing career. Since then, he has had a variety of jobs, most notably in online mortgaging.
