= Brad Otton =

American football player, coach, and administrator (born 1972)

Profile
- Position: Quarterback

Personal information
- Born: January 25, 1972 (age 54)

Career information
- High school: Tumwater (WA)
- College: Weber State (1990-1993); USC (1994-1996)
- NFL draft: 1997: undrafted

Career history

Playing
- Washington Redskins (1997–1998)*
- * Offseason or practice squad member only

Coaching
- UNLV (2004) Quarterbacks coach

Operations
- UNLV (2003) Director of football operations

Brad Otton (born January 25, 1972) is an American former football quarterback who was the USC Trojans starter in 1995 and 1996.

== College career ==
Otton originally attended Weber State University in 1990 and redshirted as a true freshman. He served on a mission in 1991 and 1992. Upon his return, he started seven games as a redshirt-freshman, completing 183 of 314 passes for 2,307 yards and 15 touchdowns. The highlight of the season for Otton was a 67-28 victory over Northern Arizona, in which he passed for a national freshman record 540 yards and 6 touchdowns.

Before the 1994 season, he transferred to the University of Southern California. During his first year at USC, he spent most of the season as a backup to Rob Johnson, but played in seven games with two starts, due to injuries to Johnson. He finished the season 55 of 92 for 787 yards with six touchdowns and no interceptions. Prior to the 1995 season Otton and Kyle Wachholtz were competing for the starting job. Otton started the opener, but split time with Wachholtz throughout the season. He finished the year 159 of 256 for 1,923 yards with 14 touchdowns and four interceptions. He helped lead the team to a 41 to 32 victory over Northwestern in the 1996 Rose Bowl, completing 29 of 44 passes for 391 yards and two touchdowns. As a senior in 1996 Otton became the full-time starter. He finished the season 196 of 370 for 2,649 yards with 20 touchdowns and 10 interceptions.

Otton finished his college career completing 410 of 718 passes for 5,359 yards with 40 touchdowns and 14 interceptions.

== Professional career ==
After going undrafted in the 1997 NFL draft, Otton signed with the Washington Redskins. He missed the season recovering from knee surgery. He returned in 1998 but was released by the Redskins after suffering another injury.

== Post professional career ==
Otton was the quarterbacks coach for the UNLV Rebels in 2004. He opened his own pizza chain called Settebello Pizzeria in 2005.
