= 1995 NCAA Division I-A football rankings =

- Season: 1995
- Bowl season: 1995–96 bowl games
- Preseason No. 1: Florida State
- End of season champions: Nebraska

Two human polls comprised the 1995 National Collegiate Athletic Association (NCAA) Division I-A football rankings. Unlike most sports, college football's governing body, the NCAA, does not bestow a national championship, instead that title is bestowed by one or more different polling agencies. There are two main weekly polls that begin in the preseason—the AP Poll and the Coaches Poll.

== Legend ==
	Increase in ranking
	Decrease in ranking
	Not ranked previous week
	National champion
(#–#)	Win–loss record
(Italics)	Number of first place votes
т	Tied with team above or below also with this symbol

== AP Poll ==
	Preseason Aug 22	Week 1 Aug 29	Week 2 Sep 5	Week 3 Sep 12	Week 4 Sep 19	Week 5 Sep 26	Week 6 Oct 3	Week 7 Oct 10	Week 8 Oct 17	Week 9 Oct 24	Week 10 Oct 31	Week 11 Nov 7	Week 12 Nov 14	Week 13 Nov 21	Week 14 Nov 28	Week 15 Dec 5	Week 16 (Final) Jan 4	
1.	Florida State (31)	Florida State (0–0) (31)	Florida State (1–0) (38)	Florida State (2–0) (33)	Florida State (3–0) (36)	Florida State (4–0) (42)	Florida State (4–0) (37)	Florida State (5–0) (40)	Florida State (6–0) (38)	Florida State (7–0) (34)	Nebraska (8–0) (23)	Nebraska (9–0) (45)	Nebraska (10–0) (45)	Nebraska (10–0) (44)	Nebraska (11–0) (51)	Nebraska (11–0) (50)	Nebraska (12–0) (62)	1.
2.	Nebraska (15)	Nebraska (0–0) (15)	Nebraska (1–0) (14)	Nebraska (2–0) (20)	Nebraska (3–0) (19)	Nebraska (4–0) (18)	Nebraska (5–0) (17)	Nebraska (5–0) (16)	Nebraska (6–0) (16)	Nebraska (7–0) (20)	Florida State (7–0) (31)	Ohio State (9–0) (12)	Ohio State (10–0) (12)	Ohio State (11–0) (13)	Florida (11–0) (11)	Florida (12–0) (12)	Florida (12–1)	2.
3.	Texas A&M (6)	Texas A&M (0–0) (6)	Texas A&M (1–0) (4)	Texas A&M (1–0) (4)	Texas A&M (2–0) (5)	Florida (3–0) (2)	Florida (4–0) (2)	Florida (5–0) (2)	Florida (6–0) (3)	Florida (6–0) (3)	Florida (7–0) (2)	Florida (8–0) (5)	Florida (9–0) (5)	Florida (10–0) (5)	Northwestern (10–1)	Northwestern (10–1)	Tennessee (11–1)	3.
4.	Penn State (1)	Penn State (0–0) (1)	Penn State (0–0) (1)	Florida (2–0) (2)	Florida (3–0) (2)	Colorado (4–0)	Colorado (5–0) (6)	Ohio State (5–0) (4)	Ohio State (6–0) (5)	Ohio State (7–0) (5)	Ohio State (8–0) (6)	Tennessee (8–1)	Tennessee (8–1)	Northwestern (10–1)	Tennessee (10–1)	Tennessee (10–1) т	Florida State (10–2)	4.
5.	Florida (6)	Florida (0–0) (5)	Florida (1–0) (2)	Auburn (2–0) (2)	USC (2–0)	USC (3–0)	Ohio State (4–0) т	USC (5–0)	USC (6–0)	Tennessee (6–1)	Tennessee (7–1)	Northwestern (8–1)	Northwestern (9–1)	Tennessee (9–1)	Ohio State (11–1)	Ohio State (11–1) т	Colorado (10–2)	5.
6.	Auburn (2)	Auburn (0–0) (2)	Auburn (1–0) (2)	USC (1–0)	Penn State (2–0)	Penn State (3–0)	USC (4–0) т	Tennessee (5–1)	Tennessee (6–1)	Kansas (7–0)	Northwestern (7–1)	Florida State (7–1)	Florida State (8–1)	Florida State (9–1)	Notre Dame (9–2)	Notre Dame (9–2)	Ohio State (11–2)	6.
7.	USC	USC (0–0)	USC (0–0)	Penn State (1–0)	Colorado (3–0)	Ohio State (3–0)	Michigan (5–0)	Auburn (4–1)	Kansas (6–0)	Colorado (6–1)	Michigan (7–1)	Kansas State (8–1)	Kansas State (9–1)	Notre Dame (9–2)	Colorado (9–2)	Colorado (9–2)	Kansas State (10–2)	7.
8.	Tennessee (1)	Tennessee (0–0) (1)	Tennessee (1–0) (1)	Tennessee (2–0) (1)	Ohio State (2–0)	Michigan (4–0)	Texas A&M (2–1)	Kansas State (5–0)	Kansas State (6–0)	Northwestern (6–1)	Notre Dame (7–2)	Notre Dame (8–2)	Notre Dame (8–2)	Colorado (9–2)	Florida State (9–2)	Florida State (9–2)	Northwestern (10–2)	8.
9.	Notre Dame	Notre Dame (0–0)	Ohio State (1–0)	Colorado (2–0)	Michigan (4–0)	Texas A&M (2–1)	Virginia (5–1)	Colorado (5–1)	Colorado (5–1)	Michigan (6–1)	Kansas State (7–1)	Colorado (7–2)	Colorado (8–2)	Texas (8–1–1)	Texas (9–1–1)	Texas (10–1–1)	Kansas (10–2)	9.
10.	Alabama	Ohio State (1–0)	Colorado (1–0)	Ohio State (1–0)	Oklahoma (2–0)	Oklahoma (3–0)	Tennessee (4–1)	Kansas (5–0)	Michigan (5–1)	Oregon (6–1)	Colorado (6–2)	Kansas (8–1)	Texas (7–1–1)	Kansas State (9–2)	Kansas State (9–2)	Kansas State (9–2)	Virginia Tech (10–2)	10.
11.	Miami (FL)	Alabama (0–0)	Michigan (2–0)	Michigan (3–0)	Virginia (3–1)	Virginia (4–1)	Auburn (3–1)	Michigan (5–1)	Northwestern (5–1)	Auburn (5–2)	Kansas (7–1)	Texas (6–1–1)	USC (8–1–1)	Kansas (9–2)	Kansas (9–2)	Kansas (9–2)	Notre Dame (9–3)	11.
12.	Ohio State	Miami (FL) (0–0)	UCLA (1–0)	UCLA (2–0)	Oregon (3–0)	Tennessee (3–1)	Penn State (3–1)	Alabama (4–1)	Oregon (5–1)	Notre Dame (6–2)	Penn State (6–2)	USC (7–1–1)	Michigan (8–2)	Oregon (9–2)	Oregon (9–2)	Oregon (9–2)	USC (9–2–1)	12.
13.	Colorado	Michigan (1–0)	Alabama (1–0)	Alabama (2–0)	Texas (2–0)	Auburn (2–1)	Kansas State (4–0)	Oklahoma (4–1)	Auburn (4–2)	USC (6–1)	Texas (5–1–1)	Michigan (7–2)	Virginia (8–3)	Virginia Tech (9–2)	Virginia Tech (9–2)	Virginia Tech (9–2)	Penn State (9–3)	13.
14.	Michigan	Colorado (0–0)	Oklahoma (0–0)	Oklahoma (2–0)	Auburn (2–1)	LSU (3–1)	Oklahoma (3–1)	Northwestern (4–1)	Virginia (6–2)	Kansas State (6–1)	USC (6–1–1)	Virginia (7–3)	Arkansas (8–2)	Penn State (7–3)	Michigan (9–3)	Michigan (9–3)	Texas (10–2–1)	14.
15.	Oklahoma	UCLA (0–0)	Texas (1–0)	Texas (1–0)	Tennessee (2–1)	Notre Dame (3–1)	Washington (3–1)	Oregon (4–1)	Oklahoma (4–1–1)	Texas (5–1–1)	Washington (5–2–1)	Arkansas (7–2)	Kansas (8–2)	Texas A&M (7–2)	Penn State (8–3)	Penn State (8–3)	Texas A&M (9–3)	15.
16.	UCLA	Oklahoma (0–0)	Virginia (1–1)	Virginia (2–1)	UCLA (2–1)	Kansas State (3–0)	Alabama (3–1)	Stanford (4–0–1)	Texas (4–1–1)	Penn State (5–2)	Alabama (6–2)	Alabama (7–2)	Oregon (8–2)	Auburn (8–3)	Texas A&M (8–2)	Auburn (8–3)	Virginia (9–4)	16.
17.	Virginia	Virginia (0–1)	Arizona (1–0)	Arizona (2–0)	Miami (FL) (1–1)	Maryland (4–0)	Oregon (3–1)	Notre Dame (4–2)	Notre Dame (5–2)	Washington (5–2)	Texas A&M (5–2)	Oregon (7–2)	Alabama (8–2)	USC (8–2–1)	Auburn (8–3)	USC (8–2–1)	Michigan (9–4)	17.
18.	Texas	Texas (0–0)	Washington (1–0)	Washington (1–0)	LSU (2–1)	Washington (2–1)	Arkansas (4–1)	Texas (4–1)	Iowa (5–0)	Alabama (5–2)	Arkansas (6–2)	Texas A&M (5–2)	Texas A&M (6–2)	Michigan (8–3)	USC (8–2–1)	Virginia (8–4)	Oregon (9–3)	18.
19.	Arizona	Arizona (0–0)	Miami (FL) (0–1)	Miami (FL) (1–1)	Kansas State (2–0)	Oregon (3–1)	Stanford (3–0–1)	Virginia (5–2)	Penn State (4–2)	Texas A&M (4–2)	Oregon (6–2)	Penn State (6–3)	Penn State (6–3)	Virginia (8–4)	Virginia (8–4)	Texas A&M (8–3)	Syracuse (9–3)	19.
20.	North Carolina	North Carolina (0–0)	Virginia Tech (0–0)	Oregon (2–0)	Georgia (2–1)	Alabama (2–1)	Texas (3–1)	Penn State (3–2)	Washington (4–2)	Virginia (6–3)	Syracuse (6–1)	Auburn (6–3)	Virginia Tech (8–2)	Washington (7–3–1)	Washington (7–3–1)	Washington (7–3–1)	Miami (FL) (8–3)	20.
21.	Wisconsin	Wisconsin (0–0)	Kansas State (1–0)	Air Force (2–0)	Notre Dame (2–1)	Texas (2–1)	LSU (3–1–1)	Wisconsin (2–1–1)	Alabama (4–2)	Syracuse (6–1)	Auburn (5–3)	Virginia Tech (7–2)	Auburn (7–3)	Alabama (8–3)	Alabama (8–3)	Alabama (8–3)	Alabama (8–3)	21.
22.	Boston College	Washington (0–0)	Syracuse (1–0)	Kansas State (2–0)	Washington (1–1)	Stanford (3–0–1)	Wisconsin (2–1–1)	Texas A&M (2–2)	Texas A&M (3–2)	Texas Tech (4–2)	UCLA (6–2)	Washington (5–3–1)	Washington (6–3–1)	Syracuse (8–2)	Miami (FL) (8–3)	Miami (FL) (8–3)	Auburn (8–4)	22.
23.	West Virginia	West Virginia (0–0)	NC State (1–0)	Georgia (1–1)	Alabama (2–1)	Arkansas (3–1)	Notre Dame (3–2)	Iowa (4–0)	Stanford (4–1–1)	Oklahoma (4–2–1)	Texas Tech (5–2)	Syracuse (6–2)	Syracuse (7–2)	Arkansas (8–3)	Arkansas (8–3)	Clemson (8–3)	Texas Tech (9–3)	23.
24.	Virginia Tech т	Virginia Tech (0–0)	Oregon (1–0)	Notre Dame (1–1)	Maryland (3–0)	Texas Tech (1–1)	Kansas (4–0)	Washington (3–2)	Wisconsin (2–2–1)	UCLA (5–2)	Virginia (6–3)	Clemson (6–3)	Clemson (7–3)	Clemson (8–3)	Clemson (8–3)	Arkansas (8–4)	Toledo (11–0–1)	24.
25.	Washington т	Illinois (0–0)	Notre Dame (0–1)	Northwestern (1–0)	Arizona (2–1)	Kansas (4–0)	Northwestern (3–1)	Texas Tech (2–2)	Texas Tech (3–2)	Iowa (5–1)	Oklahoma (5–2–1)	San Diego State (7–2)	Miami (FL) (6–3)	Miami (FL) (7–3)	Toledo (10–0–1)	Toledo (10–0–1)	Iowa (8–4)	25.
	Preseason Aug 22	Week 1 Aug 29	Week 2 Sep 5	Week 3 Sep 12	Week 4 Sep 19	Week 5 Sep 26	Week 6 Oct 3	Week 7 Oct 10	Week 8 Oct 17	Week 9 Oct 24	Week 10 Oct 31	Week 11 Nov 7	Week 12 Nov 14	Week 13 Nov 21	Week 14 Nov 28	Week 15 Dec 5	Week 16 (Final) Jan 4	
		Dropped: Boston College	Dropped: North Carolina; Wisconsin; West Virginia; Illinois	Dropped: Virginia Tech; Syracuse; NC State	Dropped: Air Force; Northwestern	Dropped: UCLA; Miami (FL); Georgia; Arizona	Dropped: Maryland; Texas Tech	Dropped: Arkansas; LSU	None	Dropped: Stanford; Wisconsin	Dropped: Iowa	Dropped: UCLA; Texas Tech; Oklahoma	Dropped: San Diego State	None	Dropped: Syracuse	None	Dropped: Washington; Clemson; Arkansas	

== Coaches Poll ==
	Preseason Aug 22	Week 2 Sep 5	Week 3 Sep 11	Week 4 Sep 18	Week 5 Sep 25	Week 6 Oct 2	Week 7 Oct 9	Week 8 Oct 16	Week 9 Oct 23	Week 10 Oct 30	Week 11 Nov 6	Week 12 Nov 13	Week 13 Nov 20	Week 14 Nov 27	Week 15 Dec 4	Week 16 (Final) Jan 4	
1.	Florida State (28)	Florida State (1–0) (36)	Florida State (2–0) (31)	Florida State (3–0) (33)	Florida State (4–0) (35)	Florida State (4–0) (34)	Florida State (5–0) (33)	Florida State (6–0) (34)	Florida State (7–0) (34)	Nebraska (8–0) (28)	Nebraska (9–0) (52)	Nebraska (10–0) (50)	Nebraska (10–0) (44)	Nebraska (11–0) (55)	Nebraska (11–0) (55)	Nebraska (12–0) (62)	1.
2.	Nebraska (17)	Nebraska (1–0) (19)	Nebraska (2–0) (25)	Nebraska (3–0) (24)	Nebraska (4–0) (25)	Nebraska (5–0) (24)	Nebraska (5–0) (24)	Nebraska (6–0) (22)	Nebraska (7–0) (23)	Florida State (7–0) (24)	Ohio State (9–0) (9)	Ohio State (10–0) (11)	Ohio State (11–0) (16)	Florida (11–0) (7)	Florida (12–0) (7)	Tennessee (11–1)	2.
3.	Texas A&M (7)	Texas A&M (1–0) (4)	Texas A&M (1–0) (5)	Texas A&M (2–0) (4)	Florida (3–0)	Florida (4–0)	Florida (5–0)	Florida (6–0) (1)	Florida (6–0) (1)	Florida (7–0) (1)	Florida (8–0) (1)	Florida (9–0) (1)	Florida (10–0) (2)	Northwestern (10–1)	Northwestern (10–1)	Florida (12–1)	3.
4.	Penn State (3)	Penn State (0–0) (2)	Florida (2–0)	Florida (3–0)	USC (3–0) (1)	USC (4–0) (2)	Ohio State (5–0) (3)	Ohio State (6–0) (4)	Ohio State (7–0) (4)	Ohio State (8–0) (9)	Tennessee (8–1)	Tennessee (8–1)	Northwestern (10–1)	Tennessee (10–1)	Tennessee (10–1)	Colorado (10–2)	4.
5.	Florida (5)	Florida (1–0)	USC (1–0) (1)	USC (2–0) (1)	Colorado (4–0)	Ohio State (4–0) (2)	USC (5–0) (2)	USC (6–0) (1)	Tennessee (6–1)	Tennessee (7–1)	Northwestern (8–1)	Northwestern (9–1)	Tennessee (9–1)	Ohio State (11–1)	Ohio State (11–1)	Florida State (10–2)	5.
6.	USC (2)	Auburn (1–0)	Auburn (2–0)	Penn State (2–0)	Ohio State (3–0)	Colorado (5–0)	Auburn (4–1)	Tennessee (6–1)	Kansas (7–0)	Northwestern (7–1)	Florida State (7–1)	Florida State (8–1)	Florida State (9–1)	Texas (9–1–1)	Texas (10–1–1)	Kansas State (10–2)	6.
7.	Auburn	USC (0–0) (1)	Penn State (1–0)	Ohio State (2–0)	Penn State (3–0)	Michigan (5–0)	Tennessee (5–1)	Kansas (6–0)	Colorado (6–1)	Michigan (7–1)	Kansas State (8–1)	Kansas State (9–1)	Texas (8–1–1)	Colorado (9–2)	Colorado (9–2)	Northwestern (10–2)	7.
8.	Notre Dame	Ohio State (1–0)	Ohio State (1–0)	Colorado (3–0)	Michigan (4–0)	Texas A&M (2–1)	Kansas State (5–0)	Kansas State (6–0)	Northwestern (6–1)	Kansas State (7–1)	Texas (6–1–1)	Texas (7–1–1)	Colorado (9–2)	Florida State (9–2)	Florida State (9–2)	Ohio State (11–2)	8.
9.	Miami (FL)	Michigan (2–0)	Michigan (3–0)	Michigan (4–0)	Oklahoma (3–0)	Virginia (5–1)	Kansas (5–0)	Colorado (5–1)	Michigan (6–1)	Texas (5–1–1)	Notre Dame (8–2)	Colorado (8–2)	Notre Dame (9–2)	Notre Dame (9–2)	Notre Dame (9–2)	Virginia Tech (10–2)	9.
10.	Ohio State	Colorado (1–0)	Colorado (2–0)	Texas (2–0)	Texas A&M (2–1)	Auburn (3–1)	Colorado (4–1)	Michigan (5–1)	USC (6–1)	Notre Dame (7–2)	Colorado (7–2) т	Notre Dame (8–2)	Kansas State (9–2)	Kansas State (9–2)	Kansas State (9–2)	Kansas (10–2)	10.
11.	Tennessee	Tennessee (1–0)	UCLA (2–0)	Oklahoma (2–0)	Virginia (4–1)	Tennessee (4–1)	Michigan (5–1)	Northwestern (5–1)	Auburn (5–2)	USC (6–1–1)	USC (7–1–1) т	USC (8–1–1)	Virginia Tech (9–2)	Virginia Tech (9–2)	Virginia Tech (9–2)	USC (9–2–1)	11.
12.	Michigan	UCLA (1–0)	Tennessee (2–0)	Auburn (2–1)	Auburn (2–1)	Penn State (3–1)	Oklahoma (4–1)	Oregon (5–1)	Oregon (6–1)	Colorado (6–2)	Kansas (8–1)	Virginia (8–3)	Oregon (9–2)	Oregon (9–2)	Oregon (9–2)	Penn State (9–3)	12.
13.	Colorado	Texas (1–0)	Texas (1–0)	Oregon (3–0)	Tennessee (3–1)	Kansas State (4–0)	Texas (4–1)	Auburn (4–2)	Texas (5–1–1)	Penn State (6–2)	Virginia (7–3)	Arkansas (8–2)	Texas A&M (7–2)	Texas A&M (8–2)	Kansas (9–2)	Notre Dame (9–3)	13.
14.	Alabama	Oklahoma (0–0)	Oklahoma (1–0)	Virginia (3–1)	Notre Dame (3–1)	Oklahoma (3–1)	Alabama (4–1)	Oklahoma (4–1–1)	Kansas State (6–1)	Kansas (7–1)	Texas A&M (6–2)	Michigan (8–2)	Kansas (9–2)	Kansas (9–2)	Michigan (9–3)	Texas (10–2–1)	14.
15.	UCLA	Arizona (1–0)	Washington (1–0)	UCLA (2–1)	Kansas State (3–0)	Washington (3–1)	Oregon (4–1)	Virginia (6–2)	Notre Dame (6–2)	Syracuse (6–1)	Michigan (7–2)	Texas A&M (6–2)	Auburn (8–3)	Michigan (9–3)	Auburn (8–3)	Texas A&M (9–3)	15.
16.	Virginia	Alabama (1–0)	Arizona (2–0)	Tennessee (2–1)	LSU (3–1)	Texas (3–1)	Virginia (5–2)	Texas (4–1–1)	Penn State (5–2)	Texas A&M (5–2)	Arkansas (7–2)	Oregon (8–2)	Penn State (7–3)	Auburn (8–3)	Penn State (8–3)	Syracuse (9–3)	16.
17.	Oklahoma	Washington (1–0)	Virginia (2–1)	Miami (FL) (1–1)	Maryland (4–0)	Alabama (3–1)	Northwestern (4–1)	Iowa (5–0)	Syracuse (6–1)	Washington (5–2–1)	Oregon (7–2)	Kansas (8–2)	USC (8–2–1)	Penn State (8–3)	USC (8–2–1)	Virginia (9–4)	17.
18.	Texas	Virginia (1–1)	Alabama (2–0)	Georgia (2–1)	Washington (2–1)	Oregon (3–1)	Texas A&M (2–2)	Penn State (4–2)	Texas A&M (4–2)	Arkansas (6–2)	Alabama (7–2)	Virginia Tech (8–2)	Syracuse (8–2)	USC (8–2–1)	Texas A&M (8–3)	Oregon (9–3)	18.
19.	Arizona	NC State (1–0)	Air Force (2–0)	Kansas State (2–0)	Texas (2–1)	Kansas (4–0)	Stanford (4–0–1)	Texas A&M (3–2)	Washington (5–2)	Oregon (6–2)	Virginia Tech (7–2)	Alabama (8–2)	Virginia (8–4)	Virginia (8–4)	Virginia (8–4)	Michigan (9–4)	19.
20.	North Carolina	Syracuse (1–0)	Miami (FL) (1–1)	LSU (2–1)	Oregon (3–1)	Stanford (3–0–1)	Penn State (3–2)	Syracuse (5–1)	Virginia (6–3)	Virginia (6–3)	Auburn (6–3)	Auburn (7–3)	Michigan (8–3)	Washington (7–3–1)	Washington (7–3–1)	Texas Tech (9–3)	20.
21.	Washington	Miami (FL) (0–1)	Kansas State (2–0)	Notre Dame (2–1)	Alabama (2–1)	Arkansas (4–1)	Notre Dame (4–2)	Baylor (4–1)	Oklahoma (4–2–1)	UCLA (6–2)	Penn State (6–3)	Penn State (6–3)	Washington (7–3–1)	Miami (FL) (8–3)	Clemson (8–3)	Auburn (8–4)	21.
22.	Wisconsin	Virginia Tech (0–0)	Oregon (2–0)	Washington (1–1)	Kansas (4–0)	LSU (3–1–1)	Iowa (4–0)	Notre Dame (5–2)	Alabama (5–2)	Alabama (6–2)	Syracuse (6–2)	Syracuse (7–2)	Clemson (8–3)	Clemson (8–3)	Syracuse (8–3)	Iowa (8–4)	22.
23.	Boston College	Kansas State (1–0)	Georgia (1–1)	Alabama (2–1)	Stanford (3–0–1)	Notre Dame (3–2)	Baylor (3–1)	Washington (4–2)	Iowa (5–1)	Auburn (5–3)	Washington (5–3–1)	Washington (6–3–1)	Alabama (8–3)	Alabama (8–3)	Arkansas (8–4)	East Carolina (9–3)	23.
24.	Illinois	Georgia (1–0)	Notre Dame (1–1)	Arizona (2–1)	Arkansas (3–1)	Baylor (3–1)	Syracuse (4–1)	Alabama (4–2)	UCLA (5–2)	Texas Tech (5–2)	UCLA (6–3)	Clemson (7–3)	Arkansas (8–3)	Arkansas (8–3)	UCLA (7–4)	Toledo (11–0–1)	24.
25.	NC State	Air Force (1–0)	Boston College (1–1)	Maryland (3–0)	UCLA (2–2)	UCLA (3–2)	Wisconsin (2–1–1)	Stanford (4–1–1)	Texas Tech (4–2)	Oklahoma (5–2–1)	Clemson (6–3)	BYU (6–3)	Miami (FL) (7–3)	Syracuse (8–3)	Texas Tech (8–3)	LSU (7–4–1)	25.
	Preseason Aug 22	Week 2 Sep 5	Week 3 Sep 11	Week 4 Sep 18	Week 5 Sep 25	Week 6 Oct 2	Week 7 Oct 9	Week 8 Oct 16	Week 9 Oct 23	Week 10 Oct 30	Week 11 Nov 6	Week 12 Nov 13	Week 13 Nov 20	Week 14 Nov 27	Week 15 Dec 4	Week 16 (Final) Jan 4	
		Dropped: Notre Dame; North Carolina; Wisconsin; Boston College; Illinois	Dropped: NC State; Syracuse; Virginia Tech	Dropped: Air Force; Boston College	Dropped: Miami (FL); Georgia; Arizona	Dropped: Maryland	Dropped: Washington; Arkansas; LSU; UCLA	Dropped: Wisconsin	Dropped: Baylor; Stanford	Dropped: Iowa	Dropped: Texas Tech; Oklahoma	Dropped: UCLA	Dropped: BYU	None	Dropped: Miami (FL)^{A}; Alabama^{A}	Dropped: Washington; Clemson; Arkansas; UCLA	

A. Miami (FL) and Alabama became ineligible for the Coaches Poll after Week 14 due to NCAA sanctions
