= 1996 Rose Bowl =

American college football game

- 82nd Rose Bowl Game
Northwestern Wildcats	USC Trojans
(10–1)	(8–2–1)
32	41
Head coach: Gary Barnett	Head coach: John Robinson
AP / Coaches / BA; 3 / 3 / 3	AP / Coaches / BA; 17 / 17 / 17
	1	2	3	4	Total
Northwestern	7	3	16	6	32
USC	7	17	7	10	41
- Date: January 1, 1996
- Season: 1995
- Stadium: Rose Bowl
- Location: Pasadena, California
- MVP: Keyshawn Johnson (USC WR)
- Referee: Randy Christal (Southwest Conference)
- Halftime show: Spirit of Troy, Northwestern University Wildcat Marching Band
- Attendance: 100,102

United States TV coverage
- Network: ABC
- Announcers: Keith Jackson (play-by-play); Bob Griese (analyst); Lynn Swann (sideline)

The 1996 Rose Bowl was the 82nd Rose Bowl Game. It was the 50th game in the series featuring the Big Ten Conference and the Pacific-10 Conference. The USC Trojans defeated the Northwestern Wildcats, 41–32, on the strength of two touchdown passes from USC quarterback Brad Otton to wide receiver Keyshawn Johnson. Johnson was named the Rose Bowl Player Of The Game.

== Pre-game activities ==
The game was presided over by the 1996 Tournament of Roses Royal Court and Rose Parade Grand Marshal Kermit the Frog. Members of the court were: Queen Keli Hutchins, San Marino, San Marino High School; Princesses Lissa Anderson, Pasadena, Blair High School; Sarah Clinton, Arcadia, Arcadia High School; Nancy Grace, South Pasadena, Mayfield Senior School; Katherine Kingston, San Marino, San Marino High School; Jennifer Lai, Pasadena, Westridge School for Girls; and Sara Packer, La Canada, La Canada High School.

== Teams ==
=== Northwestern Wildcats ===
The Northwestern Wildcats had a string of losing seasons stretching back to 1972, and had not appeared in the Rose Bowl for 47 years, a win in January 1949. The Wildcats opened the 1995 season with a surprise 17–15 win at #9 Notre Dame on September 3, 1995. That Notre Dame finished at number 6 and went to the Orange Bowl. However, Notre Dame set the record for largest drop in the rankings AP Poll in the Top-25 era when the next AP poll was released, dropping 16 spots to #25 (this record was beaten by Michigan after losing to Appalachian State during the first week of the 2007 season). The Wildcats, who were then ranked in the AP poll for the first time since 1971, fell out of the spotlight when they lost to Miami University in their next game. They won against Air Force and Indiana to get back to #25 in the polls. On October 2, the Wildcats had another win that brought them back into national attention, a 19–13 victory over Michigan in Ann Arbor. The Wildcats won the rest of their games with a perfect 8–0 record in the Big Ten Conference. In response to the Wildcats earning a berth in the Rose Bowl, announcer Keith Jackson uttered the quote "We've had all the romance; now let's find out if she can dance."

=== USC Trojans ===
The USC Trojans opened with six wins until losing at Notre Dame, 38–10, on October 21. On October 28, USC and Washington played what would be the deciding game for the conference at Husky Stadium. Down 21–0 in the fourth quarter, the Trojans scored three straight touchdowns, with the final coming with 33 seconds remaining. The game ended in a 21–21 tie. A Washington loss to Oregon on November 4 put USC in the lead in the Pac-10 race. Coming into the UCLA–USC rivalry game, the Trojans already had the Rose Bowl berth by virtue of more non-conference victories than Washington, even though a loss to the Bruins would leave both teams with a 6–1–1 record. The Trojans lost to the Bruins, 24–20.

== Game summary ==
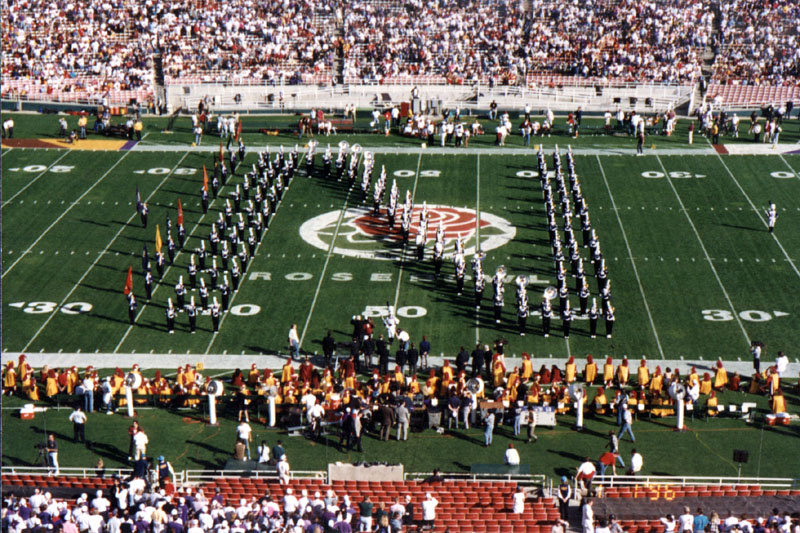
The Northwestern University "Wildcat" Marching Band performs the Alma Mater at the 1996 Rose Bowl under the direction of John P. Paynter.

=== Scoring ===
==== First quarter ====
- USC: S. Woods 1-yd run (Abrams kick) USC 7–0
- NU: D. Autry 3-yd run (Gowins kick) Tied 7–7

==== Second quarter ====
- USC: Barnum 21-yd pass from Otton (Abrams kick) 13:05 USC 14–7
- USC: Abrams 30-yd FG 3:29 USC 17–7
- USC: McCutcheon 53-yd fumble return (Abrams kick) 2:56 USC 24–7
- NU: Gowins 29-yd FG 0:02 USC 24–10

==== Third quarter ====
- NU: Gowins 28-yd FG 11:01 USC 24–13
- NU: D.Autry 9-yd run (conversion failed) 8:17 USC 24–19
- USC: K.Johnson 56-yd pass from Otton (Abrams kick) 6:08 USC 31–19
- NU: Schnur 1-yd run (Gowins kick) 2:58 USC 31–26

==== Fourth quarter ====
- NU: D. Autry 2-yd run (conversion failed) 13:01 NU 32–31
- USC: Abrams 46-yd FG 9:09 USC 34–32
- USC: Washington 2-yd run (Abrams kick) 3:00 USC 41–32
