= 1995 Carquest Bowl =

The 1995 Carquest Bowl may refer to the following games in American football, held in the United States:

- 1995 Carquest Bowl (January) - January 2, 1995, game between the South Carolina Gamecocks and the West Virginia Mountaineers
- 1995 Carquest Bowl (December) - December 30, 1995, game between the North Carolina Tar Heels and the Arkansas Razorbacks
