= George Welsh (American football) =

American football player and coach (1933–2019)

Biographical details
- Born: August 26, 1933; Coaldale, Pennsylvania, U.S.
- Died: January 2, 2019 (aged 85); Charlottesville, Virginia, U.S.

Playing career
- 1952–1955: Navy
- Position: Quarterback

Coaching career (HC unless noted)
- 1963–1972: Penn State (assistant)
- 1973–1981: Navy
- 1982–2000: Virginia

Head coaching record
- Overall: 189–132–4
- Bowls: 5–10

Accomplishments and honors

Championships
- 2 ACC (1989, 1995)

Awards
- Bobby Dodd Coach of the Year Award (1991); 4x ACC Coach of the Year (1983, 1984, 1991, 1995); First-team All-American (1955); First-team All-Eastern (1954, 1955); NCAA passing yards leader (1955)
- College Football Hall of Fame; Inducted in 2004 (profile)

George Thomas Welsh (August 26, 1933 – January 2, 2019) was an American college football player and coach. He served as head football coach of the Navy Midshipmen football team of the United States Naval Academy from 1973 to 1981, and the Virginia Cavaliers football team of the University of Virginia from 1982 to 2000.

Welsh retired as the winningest coach in ACC history. Although that record was later surpassed by Bobby Bowden of Florida State, Welsh remains far and away the most successful coach in UVA history (his 134 wins are more than double those of runner-up Al Groh). He was named ACC Coach of the Year four times (1983, 1984, 1991 and 1995) and National Coach of the Year once (1991).

Upon Welsh's retirement after the 2000 season, his 189 career victories ranked him 24th in Division I-A history.

Welsh was inducted into the College Football Hall of Fame as a coach in 2004.

== Early life and career ==
Welsh was born in Coaldale, Pennsylvania. He played for the Navy Midshipmen from 1952 to 1955, and was a first-team All-American at quarterback in 1955. After graduating from the U.S. Naval Academy in 1956, he served as an assistant coach under Rip Engle and Joe Paterno at Penn State from 1963 to 1972.

== Head coach at Navy ==
Welsh began his head coaching career at the U.S. Naval Academy in 1973. He inherited a Navy Midshipmen football program that had only had one winning season since the end of the Roger Staubach era. He led the Midshipmen to three bowl game appearances and their first nine-win season in 16 years. In nine seasons, Welsh compiled a record of 55–46–1, including a 7-1-1 record against Army. He left as Navy's all-time winningest coach, though he has since been passed by Ken Niumatalolo.

== Head coach at UVA ==
In 1982, Welsh left Navy to become the head coach of the Virginia Cavaliers, who had just finished a 1-10 season. He walked into a situation even worse than the one he had inherited at Navy. Prior to his arrival, Virginia had only two winning seasons in the previous 29 years and had never been to a post-season bowl game. The Cavaliers had also only one winning record in Atlantic Coast Conference (ACC) play, had only finished higher than fourth twice, and had only won 33 conference games in 29 years of ACC play.

Welsh turned around the program quickly. In his third season he led the Cavaliers to their first-ever bowl appearance, a victory in the 1984 Peach Bowl. In 1987, Virginia started a streak of 13 straight seasons with seven or more wins. This stretch included shared ACC titles in 1989 and 1995–to date, the only ACC titles in school history–and 11 additional bowl appearances. His teams also compiled four nine-win seasons, including a then-school-record 10 wins in 1989. His 1990 team was ranked No. 1 in both polls for two weeks in October—to date, the only time a Division I team from the Commonwealth has been ranked No. 1 in a major poll, and the highest that a team from the Commonwealth has ever been ranked at that point in the season. His 1995 team defeated Florida State 33–28 on November 2, the first time the Seminoles had lost a conference game since joining the conference.

Welsh retired after the 2000 season due to health concerns.

In 19 years as the Cavaliers' head coach, he became the most successful coach in school and Atlantic Coast Conference history. Before Welsh arrived at Virginia, the Cavaliers had won just 7 of their last 27 yearly football contests against rival Virginia Tech. During Welsh's head coaching career at UVa, his teams went 9–10 against Virginia Tech, including an 8–6 record against Hokies coach Frank Beamer. At one point during Welsh's coaching career at UVA, Virginia won 5 of 6 games against the Hokies, with 3 of the wins coming on Tech's home field. UVa firsts accomplished under Welsh:

- First bowl appearance—1984 Peach Bowl vs. Purdue
- First-ever unanimous All-America choice—1985, offensive tackle Jim Dombrowski
- Signed UVA's first Parade All-American National football Player-Of-The-Year, 1988, running back Terry Kirby of Tabb (VA) High School
- First 10-win season—1989, 10–3
- First ACC Championship—1989
- First victory over Clemson—1990
- First time ranked #1—1990, 4 weeks
- First team to beat Florida State in ACC play—1995

In 2009, Welsh was inducted into the Virginia Sports Hall of Fame.

== Death ==
Welsh died at his home in Virginia on January 2, 2019, at the age of 85.

== Head coaching record ==
Year	Team	Overall	Conference	Standing	Bowl/playoffs	Coaches^{#}	AP^{°}
Navy Midshipmen (NCAA Division I / I-A independent) (1973–1981)
1973	Navy	4–7					
1974	Navy	4–7					
1975	Navy	7–4					
1976	Navy	4–7					
1977	Navy	5–6					
1978	Navy	9–3			W Holiday	17	
1979	Navy	7–4					
1980	Navy	8–4			L Garden State		
1981	Navy	7–4–1			L Liberty		
Navy:		55–46–1					
Virginia Cavaliers (Atlantic Coast Conference) (1982–2000)
1982	Virginia	2–9	1–5	6th			
1983	Virginia	6–5	3–3	T–4th			
1984	Virginia	8–2–2	3–1–2	2nd	W Peach	17	20
1985	Virginia	6–5	4–3	T–3rd			
1986	Virginia	3–8	2–5	T–6th			
1987	Virginia	8–4	5–2	2nd	W All-American		
1988	Virginia	7–4	5–2	2nd			
1989	Virginia	10–3	6–1	T–1st	L Florida Citrus	15	18
1990	Virginia	8–4	5–2	T–2nd	L Sugar	15	23
1991	Virginia	8–3–1	4–2–1	4th	L Gator		
1992	Virginia	7–4	4–4	T–4th			
1993	Virginia	7–5	5–3	T–3rd	L Carquest		
1994	Virginia	9–3	5–3	T–3rd	W Independence	13	15
1995	Virginia	9–4	7–1	T–1st	W Peach	17	16
1996	Virginia	7–5	5–3	4th	L Carquest		
1997	Virginia	7–4	5–3	T–3rd			
1998	Virginia	9–3	6–2	3rd	L Peach	18	18
1999	Virginia	7–5	5–3	T–2nd	L MicronPC		
2000	Virginia	6–6	5–3	4th	L Oahu		
Virginia:		134–86–3	85–51–3				
Total:		189–132–4					
National championship Conference title Conference division title or championship game berth
^{#}Rankings from final Coaches Poll.; ^{°}Rankings from final AP Poll.

== See also ==
- Legends Poll
- List of NCAA major college football yearly passing leaders
- List of NCAA major college football yearly total offense leaders
