= 1995 Pittsburgh Panthers football team =

American college football season

1995 Pittsburgh Panthers football
- Conference: Big East Conference
- Record: 2–9 (0–7 Big East)
- Head coach: Johnny Majors (7th season)
- Offensive coordinator: Ken Karcher (3rd season)
- Offensive scheme: Multiple
- Defensive coordinator: Chuck Driesbach (3rd season)
- Base defense: Multiple 4–3
- Home stadium: Pitt Stadium

1995 Big East Conference football standings
	Conf.			Overall
Team	W		L	W		L
No. 10 Virginia Tech +	6	–	1	10	–	2
No. 20 Miami (FL) +	6	–	1	8	–	3
No. 19 Syracuse	5	–	2	9	–	3
West Virginia	4	–	3	5	–	6
Boston College	4	–	3	4	–	8
Rutgers	2	–	5	4	–	7
Temple	1	–	6	1	–	10
Pittsburgh	0	–	7	2	–	9
+ – Conference co-champions; Rankings from AP Poll

The 1995 Pittsburgh Panthers football team represented the University of Pittsburgh in the 1995 NCAA Division I-A football season.

== Schedule ==
Date	Time	Opponent	Site	TV	Result	Attendance	Source
September 2	7:00 p.m.	Washington State*	Pitt Stadium; Pittsburgh, PA		W 17–13	35,513	
September 9	7:00 p.m.	Eastern Michigan*	Pitt Stadium; Pittsburgh, PA		W 66–30	28,329	
September 16	3:30 p.m.	at No. 15 Texas*	Texas Memorial Stadium; Austin, TX	ABC	L 27–38	62,875	
September 23	3:30 p.m.	No. 8 Ohio State*	Pitt Stadium; Pittsburgh, PA	ABC	L 14–54	54,917	
September 30	12:00 p.m.	Virginia Tech	Pitt Stadium; Pittsburgh, PA	Big East Network	L 16–26	31,036	
October 7	12:00 p.m.	at Boston College	Alumni Stadium; Chestnut Hill, MA	Big East Network	L 0–17	44,500	
October 14	6:00 p.m.	at Temple	Veterans Stadium; Philadelphia, PA		L 27–29	14,968	
October 21	12:00 p.m.	Miami (FL)	Pitt Stadium; Pittsburgh, PA	Big East Network	L 16–17	28,794	
October 28	1:00 p.m.	at Rutgers	Rutgers Stadium; Piscataway, NJ		L 24–42	18,911	
November 11	12:00 p.m.	No. 23 Syracuse	Pitt Stadium; Pittsburgh, PA (rivalry)		L 10–42	20,279	
November 24	4:00 p.m.	at West Virginia	Mountaineer Field; Morgantown, WV (Backyard Brawl)	ESPN	L 0–21	38,795	
*Non-conference game; Rankings from AP Poll released prior to the game; All times are in Eastern time

== Game summaries ==
=== Washington State ===
Washington State Cougars at Pitt Panthers

Quarter	1	2	3	4	Total
Washington State	0	3	3	7	13
Pitt	3	0	0	14	17

at Pitt Stadium, Pittsburgh, Pennsylvania

- Date: September 2, 1995
- Game time: 7:00 p.m. EST
- Game attendance: 35,513
- Box score

Game information
First quarter
- PITT - C. Ferencik 38-yard field goal

Second quarter

- WSU - T. Traunt 42-yard field goal

Third quarter

- WSU - T. Traunt 20-yard field goal

Fourth quarter

- PITT - D. Jells 8-yard pass from J. Ryan (C. Ferencik kick)
- WSU - F. Madu 11-yard run (T. Truant kick)
- PITT - D. Jells 6-yard pass from J. Ryan (C. Ferencik kick)

=== Eastern Michigan ===
Eastern Michigan Eagles at Pitt Panthers

Quarter	1	2	3	4	Total
Eastern Michigan	10	7	0	13	30
Pitt	7	31	21	7	66

at Pitt Stadium, Pittsburgh, Pennsylvania

- Date: September 9, 1995
- Game time: 7:00 p.m. EST
- Game attendance: 28,329
- Box score

Game information
First quarter
- EMU - TD
- PITT - D Harris 1 run (Ferencik kick)
- EMU - FG Ventura 28

Second quarter

- PITT - FG Ferencik 41
- EMU - Adams 2 run (Ventura kick)
- PITT - D Harris 55 run (Ferencik kick)
- PITT - Jells 66 pass from Ryan (Ferencik kick)
- PITT - Schneider 10 pass from Ryan (Ferencik kick)
- PITT - Jells 7 pass from Ryan (Ferencik kick)

Third quarter

- PITT - D Harris 3 run (Ferencik kick)
- PITT - K Jackson 6 pass from Gonzalez (Ferencik kick)
- PITT - V Williams 5 run (Ferencik kick)

Fourth quarter

- EMU - Scott 1 run (Ventura kick)
- PITT - V Williams 4 run (Ferencik kick)
- EMU - Greene 22 pass from Armour (Ventura kick)

=== Texas ===
Pitt Panthers at #15 Texas Longhorns

Quarter	1	2	3	4	Total
Pitt	7	3	10	7	27
Texas	7	7	7	17	38

at Texas Memorial Stadium, Austin, Texas

- Date: September 16, 1995
- Game attendance: 62,875
- TV: ABC
- Box score

Game information
First quarter
- PITT - D. Jells 8 pass from J. Ryan (C. Ferencik kick)
- TEX - S. Mitchell 19 run (P.Dawson kick)

Second quarter

- PITT - FG C. Ferencik 22
- TEX - P. Fitzgerald 15 pass from J. Brown (P. Dawson kick)

Third quarter

- PITT - C. Schneider 1 run (C. Ferencik kick)
- TEX - M. Adams 33 pass from J. Brooks (P. Dawson kick)
- PITT - FG C. Ferencik 32

Fourth quarter

- TEX - FG P. Dawson 35
- PITT - D. Harris 18 run (C. Ferencik kick)
- TEX - Ri. Williams 1 run (P. Dawson kick)
- TEX - J. Reeves 45 interception return (P. Dawson kick)

=== Ohio State ===
#8 Ohio State Buckeyes at Pitt Panthers

Quarter	1	2	3	4	Total
Ohio State	14	6	21	13	54
Pitt	7	7	0	0	14

at Pitt Stadium, Pittsburgh, Pennsylvania

- Date: September 23, 1995
- Game time: 3:30 p.m. EST
- Game weather: Partly Sunny, Cool, 58 °F (14 °C); Wind N 12
- Game attendance: 54,917
- Referee: David Witvoet
- Box Score

Game information

First quarter

- OSU - Terry Glenn 75-yard pass from Bobby Hoying (Josh Jackson kick)
- PITT - Dietrich Jells 24-yard pass from John Ryan (C. Ferencik kick)
- OSU - Terry Glenn 12-yard pass from Bobby Hoying (Josh Jackson kick)

Second quarter

- PITT - Chris Patton 3-yard run (C. Ferencik kick)
- OSU - Josh Jackson 24-yard field goal
- OSU - Josh Jackson 39-yard field goal

Third quarter

- OSU - Terry Glenn 36-yard pass from Bobby Hoying (Bobby Hoying pass to Terry Glenn)
- OSU - Nicky Sualua 2-yard pass from Bobby Hoying (Josh Jackson kick)
- OSU - Terry Glenn 61-yard pass from Bobby Hoying (kick failed)

Fourth quarter

- OSU - Dimitrious Stanley 25-yard pass from Stanley Jackson (kick failed)
- OSU - Alonzo Shavers 7-yard pass from Tommy Hoying (Josh Jackson kick)

Top Passers

- OSU - Bobby Hoying - 15/24, 296 yards, 5 TDs, 2 INTs
- PITT - John Ryan - 14/23, 182 yards, 1 TD, 3 INTs
- OSU - Stanley Jackson - 7/8, 118 yards, 1 TD

Top Rushers

- OSU - Eddie George - 24 rushes, 122 yards
- PITT - Demetrius Harris - 17 rushes, 56 yards

Top Receivers

- OSU - Terry Glenn - 9 receptions, 253 yards (OSU school record), 4 TDs
- PITT - Dietrich Jells - 7 receptions, 91 yards, 1 TD

=== Virginia Tech ===
Virginia Tech Hokies at Pitt Panthers

Quarter	1	2	3	4	Total
Virginia Tech	0	0	10	16	26
Pitt	3	6	7	0	16

at Pitt Stadium, Pittsburgh, Pennsylvania

- Date: September 30, 1995
- Game time: 12:00 p.m. EST
- Game attendance: 31,036
- Box score

Game information
First quarter
- PITT - C. Ferencik 37-yard field goal

Second quarter

- PITT - C. Ferencik 40-yard field goal
- PITT - C. Ferencik 31-yard field goal

Third quarter

- VT - D. Thomas 15-yard run (A. Larsen kick)
- PITT - C. Schneider 2-yard run (C. Ferencik kick)
- VT - A. Larsen 34-yard field goal

Fourth quarter

- VT - A. Larsen 33-yard field goal
- VT - J. Holmes 73-yard pass from J. Druckenmiller (A. Larsen kick)
- VT - A. Larsen 26-yard field goal
- VT - A. Larsen 36-yard field goal

=== Boston College ===
Pitt Panthers at Boston College Eagles

Quarter	1	2	3	4	Total
Pitt	0	0	0	0	0
Boston College	7	3	0	7	17

at Alumni Stadium, Chestnut Hill, Massachusetts

- Date: October 7, 1995
- Game attendance: 44,500
- Box score

Game information
First quarter
- BC - O. Walker 8-yard run (D. McGuire kick)

Second quarter

- BC - D. McGuire 41-yard field goal

Third quarter

- No scoring

Fourth quarter

- BC - M. Cloud 11-yard run (D. McGuire kick)

=== Temple ===
Pitt Panthers at Temple Owls

Quarter	1	2	3	4	Total
Pitt	0	13	0	14	27
Temple	7	3	7	12	29

at Veterans Stadium, Philadelphia, Pennsylvania

- Date: October 14, 1995
- Game time: 6:00 p.m. EST
- Game attendance: 4,968
- Box score

Game information
First quarter
- TEM - Culbreath 33 run (Michalski kick)

Second quarter

- TEM - FG Michalski 36
- PITT - Schneider 3 run (Ferencik kick)
- PITT - Jells 29 pass from Ryan (kick failed)

Third quarter

- TEM - Lee 1 run (Michalski kick)

Fourth quarter

- PITT - Schneider 1 run (Ferencik kick)
- TEM - Lee 14 run (kick failed)
- TEM - Lee 15 run (two-point conversion failed)
- PITT - Butler 9 pass from Gonzalez (Ferencik kick)

=== Miami (FL) ===
Miami Hurricanes at Pitt Panthers

Quarter	1	2	3	4	Total
Miami (FL)	7	0	3	7	17
Pitt	3	10	3	0	16

at Pitt Stadium, Pittsburgh, Pennsylvania

- Date: October 21, 1995
- Game time: 12:00 p.m. EST
- Game attendance: 28,794
- Box score

Game information
First quarter
- PITT - C. Ferencik 34-yard field goal
- UM - S. Tucker 15-yard pass from R. Clement (D. Prewitt kick)

Second quarter

- PITT - P. Gonzales 2-yard run (C. Ferencik kick)
- PITT - C. Ferencik 26-yard field goal

Third quarter

- UM - D. Prewitt 47-yard field goal
- PITT - C. Ferencik 39-yard field goal

Fourth quarter

- UM - D. Ferguson 16-yard run (D. Prewitt kick)

=== Rutgers ===
Pitt Panthers at Rutgers Scarlet Knights

Quarter	1	2	3	4	Total
Pitt	0	16	0	8	24
Rutgers	0	28	7	7	42

at Rutgers Stadium, Piscataway, New Jersey

- Date: October 28, 1995
- Game time: 1:00 p.m. EST
- Game attendance: 18,911
- Recap pg. 125

Game information
First quarter
- No scoring

Second quarter

- PITT - Jells 27-yard pass from Gonzalez (Ferencik kick)
- RUT - Battaglia 13-yard pass from Lucas (Mike-Mayer kick)
- PITT - Harris 74-yard run (kick failed)
- RUT - Willis 83-yard kickoff return (Mike-Mayer kick)
- PITT - Ferencik 27-yard field goal
- RUT - Harper 20-yard pass from Lucas (Mike-Mayer kick)
- RUT - Battaglia 21-yard pass from Lucas (Mike-Mayer kick)

Third quarter

- RUT - Rivers 100-yard fumble return (Mike-Mayer kick)

Fourth quarter

- PITT - Durham 5-yard pass from Ryan (Butler pass from Ryan)
- RUT - Woolridge 25-yard interception return (Mike-Mayer kick)

=== Syracuse ===
#23 Syracuse Orangemen at Pitt Panthers

Quarter	1	2	3	4	Total
Syracuse	14	14	14	0	42
Pitt	0	7	0	3	10

at Pitt Stadium, Pittsburgh, Pennsylvania

- Date: November 11, 1995
- Game time: 12:00 p.m. EST
- Game attendance: 20,279
- Box score

Game information
First quarter
- SYR - M. Thomas 37-yard run (O. Mare kick)
- SYR - R. Konrad 1-yard run (O. Mare kick)

Second quarter

- SYR - M. Harrison 5-yard pass from D. McNabb
- PITT - D. Seagraves 4-yard pass from M. Lytle (C. Ferencik kick)
- SYR - R. Konrad 16-yard run (O. Mare kick)

Third quarter

- SYR - R. Konrad 58-yard run (O. Mare kick)
- SYR - M. Harrison 16-yard pass from D. McNabb (O. Mare kick)

Fourth quarter

- PITT - C. Ferencik 29-yard field goal

=== West Virginia ===
Pitt Panthers at West Virginia Mountaineers

Quarter	1	2	3	4	Total
Pitt	0	0	0	0	0
West Virginia	0	14	7	0	21

at Mountaineer Field, Morgantown, West Virginia

- Date: November 24, 1995
- Game time: 4:00 p.m. EST
- Game attendance: 38,795
- Box score

Game information
First quarter
- No scoring

Second quarter

- WVU - Gray 14-yard run (Baumann kick)
- WVU - Saunder 29-yard pass from Johnston (Baumann kick)

Third quarter

- WVU - Purnell 7-yard pass from Johnston (Baumann kic)

Fourth quarter

- No scoring

== Personnel ==
=== Coaching staff ===
1995 Pittsburgh Panthers football staff
Coaching staff: Johnny Majors – Head coach; Charlie Coe – Assistant head coach/running backs; Bob Babich – Linebackers; Steve Bird – Receivers/kickers; Curt Cignetti – Tight ends/recruiting coordinator; Chuck Dreisbach – Defensive coordinator; Jack Henry – Offensive line; Ken Karcher – Offensive coordinator/quarterbacks; Tony Pierce – Defensive backs; Tom Turchetta – Defensive line	Support staff: Jim Earle – Assistant Athletic Director/football operations; Marc Hudak – Graduate assistant/offense; Andy Rondeau – Graduate assistant/defense	Strength and conditioning staff: Tim Wilson – Strength and conditioning Coach; Jim Schmus – Assistant Strength and Conditioning Coach

=== Roster ===
1995 Pittsburgh Panthers football team roster
Players
Coaches
Offense

Pos.	#	Name	Class
WR	26	Dietrich Jells	Sr
QB	8	Matt Lytle	So

Defense

Pos.	#	Name	Class
DB	12	Anthony Dorsett	Sr
DL	98	Mike Mohring	Jr
LB	84	Tom Tumulty	Sr

Special teams

Pos.	#	Name	Class

Head coach

- Johnny Majors

Coordinators/assistant coaches

- Andy Rondeau
  (Graduate assistant)

Legend

- (C) Team captain
- (S) Suspended
- (I) Ineligible
- Injured
- Redshirt

== Team players drafted into the NFL ==
Player	Position	Round	Pick	NFL club
Dietrich Jells	Wide receiver	6	176	Kansas City Chiefs
Anthony Dorsett	Defensive back	6	177	Houston Oilers
Tom Tumulty	Linebacker	6	178	Cincinnati Bengals
