= 1995 Clemson Tigers football team =

American college football season

1995 Clemson Tigers football

Gator Bowl, L 0–41 vs. Syracuse
- Conference: Atlantic Coast Conference
- Record: 8–4 (6–2 ACC)
- Head coach: Tommy West (2nd season)
- Co-offensive coordinators: Rick Stockstill (2nd season); Clyde Christensen (2nd season)
- Defensive coordinator: Miles Aldridge (2nd season)
- Captain: Louis Solomon
- Home stadium: Memorial Stadium

1995 Atlantic Coast Conference football standings
	Conf.			Overall
Team	W		L	W		L
No. 4 Florida State +	7	–	1	10	–	2
No. 16 Virginia +	7	–	1	9	–	4
Clemson	6	–	2	8	–	4
Georgia Tech	5	–	3	6	–	5
North Carolina	4	–	4	7	–	5
Maryland	4	–	4	6	–	5
NC State	2	–	6	3	–	8
Duke	1	–	7	3	–	8
Wake Forest	0	–	8	1	–	10
+ – Conference co-champions; Rankings from AP Poll

The 1995 Clemson Tigers football team represented Clemson University as a member of the Atlantic Coast Conference (ACC) during the 1995 NCAA Division I-A football season. Led by second-year head coach Tommy West, the Tigers compiled an overall record of 8–4 with a mark of 6–2 in conference play, placing third in the ACC. Clemson was invited to the Gator Bowl, where the Tigers lost to Syracuse. The team played home games at Memorial Stadium in Clemson, South Carolina.

== Schedule ==
Date	Time	Opponent	Rank	Site	TV	Result	Attendance	Source
September 2	1:00 p.m.	Western Carolina*		Memorial Stadium; Clemson, SC		W 55–9	62,714	
September 9	12:00 p.m.	No. 1 Florida State		Memorial Stadium; Clemson, SC (rivalry)	ABC	L 26–45	78,133	
September 16	6:30 p.m.	at Wake Forest		Groves Stadium; Winston-Salem, NC		W 29–14	18,616	
September 23	12:00 p.m.	No. 11 Virginia		Memorial Stadium; Clemson, SC	JPS	L 3–22	70,226	
September 30	1:00 p.m.	at NC State		Carter–Finley Stadium; Raleigh, NC (Textile Bowl)		W 43–22	46,074	
October 7	6:30 p.m.	Georgia*		Memorial Stadium; Clemson, SC (rivalry)		L 17–19	81,670	
October 21	12:00 p.m.	at Maryland		Byrd Stadium; College Park, MD	JPS	W 17–0	43,603	
October 28	12:00 p.m.	at Georgia Tech		Bobby Dodd Stadium; Atlanta, GA (rivalry)	JPS	W 24–3	45,245	
November 4	12:00 p.m.	North Carolina		Memorial Stadium; Clemson, SC	JPS	W 17–10	72,103	
November 11	1:00 p.m.	Duke	No. 24	Memorial Stadium; Clemson, SC		W 34–17	62,936	
November 18	12:30 p.m.	at South Carolina*	No. 24	Williams–Brice Stadium; Columbia, SC (rivalry)	JPS	W 38–17	74,990	
January 1, 1996	12:30 p.m.	vs. Syracuse*	No. 23	Jacksonville Municipal Stadium; Jacksonville, FL (Gator Bowl)	NBC	L 0–41	45,202	
*Non-conference game; Rankings from AP Poll released prior to the game; All times are in Eastern time
