= 1995 Syracuse Orangemen football team =

American college football season

1995 Syracuse Orangemen football

Gator Bowl champion

Gator Bowl, W 41–0 vs. Clemson
- Conference: Big East Conference

Ranking
- Coaches: No. 16
- AP: No. 19
- Record: 9–3 (5–2 Big East)
- Head coach: Paul Pasqualoni (5th season)
- Offensive coordinator: George DeLeone (9th season)
- Defensive coordinator: Norm Gerber (12th season)
- Captains: Cy Ellsworth; Marvin Harrison; Darrell Parker
- Home stadium: Carrier Dome

1995 Big East Conference football standings
	Conf.			Overall
Team	W		L	W		L
No. 10 Virginia Tech +	6	–	1	10	–	2
No. 20 Miami (FL) +	6	–	1	8	–	3
No. 19 Syracuse	5	–	2	9	–	3
West Virginia	4	–	3	5	–	6
Boston College	4	–	3	4	–	8
Rutgers	2	–	5	4	–	7
Temple	1	–	6	1	–	10
Pittsburgh	0	–	7	2	–	9
+ – Conference co-champions; Rankings from AP Poll

The 1995 Syracuse Orangemen football team represented Syracuse University as a member of the Big East Conference during the 1995 NCAA Division I-A football season. Led by fifth-year head coach Paul Pasqualoni, the Orangemen compiled an overall record of 9–3 with a mark of 5–2 in conference play, placing third in the Big East. Syracuse was invited to the Gator Bowl, where the Orangemen defeated Clemson. The team played home games at the Carrier Dome in Syracuse, New York.

== Schedule ==
Date	Time	Opponent	Rank	Site	TV	Result	Attendance	Source
September 2	7:30 pm	at No. 20 North Carolina*		Kenan Memorial Stadium; Chapel Hill, NC	ESPN	W 20–9	52,400	
September 9	12:00 pm	East Carolina*	No. 22	Carrier Dome; Syracuse, NY		L 24–27	39,547	
September 23	12:00 pm	Minnesota*		Carrier Dome; Syracuse, NY	BEN	W 27–17	42,780	
September 30	6:00 pm	at Rutgers		Rutgers Stadium; Piscataway, NJ		W 27–17	32,832	
October 7	12:00 pm	Temple		Carrier Dome; Syracuse, NY		W 31–14	40,646	
October 14	12:00 pm	Eastern Michigan*		Carrier Dome; Syracuse, NY		W 52–24	38,902	
October 21	12:00 pm	West Virginia		Carrier Dome; Syracuse, NY (rivalry)	BEN	W 22–0	48,880	
November 4	3:30 pm	at Virginia Tech	No. 20	Lane Stadium; Blacksburg, VA	ABC	L 7–31	51,239	
November 11	12:00 pm	at Pittsburgh	No. 23	Pitt Stadium; Pittsburgh, PA (rivalry)		W 42–10	20,279	
November 18	12:00 pm	Boston College	No. 23	Carrier Dome; Syracuse, NY	BEN	W 58–29	49,384	
November 25	7:30 pm	at No. 25 Miami (FL)	No. 22	Miami Orange Bowl; Miami, FL	ESPN	L 24–35	47,544	
January 1	12:30 pm	vs. No. 23 Clemson*		Jacksonville Municipal Stadium; Jacksonville, FL (Gator Bowl)	NBC	W 41–0	45,202	
*Non-conference game; Rankings from AP Poll released prior to the game; All times are in Eastern time

== Roster ==
1995 Syracuse Orangemen football team roster
Players			Coaches
Offense: Pos. / # / Name / Class; WR / 8 / Marvin Harrison / Sr	Defense: Pos. / # / Name / Class; LB / 41 / Nate Hemsley / Jr	Special teams: Pos. / # / Name / Class	Head coach: Paul Pasqualoni; Coordinators/assistant coaches Legend: (C) Team captain; (S) Suspended; (I) Ineligible; Injured; Redshirt

== Game summaries ==
=== North Carolina ===
Syracuse Orangemen at #20 North Carolina Tar Heels

Quarter	1	2	3	4	Total
Syracuse	0	3	0	17	20
North Carolina	3	3	3	0	9

at Kenan Memorial Stadium, Chapel Hill, North Carolina

- Date: September 2, 1995
- Game time: 7:30 p.m. EST
- Game attendance: 52,400
- Box score

Game information
First quarter
- UNC - S. Caparelli 21-yard field goal

Second quarter

- UNC - S. Caparelli 23-yard field goal
- SYR - O. Mare 37-yard field goal

Third quarter

- UNC - S. Caparelli 32-yard FG
- SYR - T. Jones 2-yard run (O. Mare kick)
- SYR - M. Thomas 9-yard run (O. Mare kick)

Fourth quarter

- SYR - O. Mare 35-yard field goal

=== East Carolina ===
East Carolina Pirates at #22 Syracuse Orangemen

Quarter	1	2	3	4	Total
East Carolina	0	7	13	7	27
Syracuse	7	14	3	0	24

at Carrier Dome, Syracuse, New York

- Date: September 9, 1995
- Game time: 12:00 p.m. EST
- Game attendance: 39,547
- Box Score

Game information
First quarter
- SYR - M. Thomas 8 run (O. Mare kick)

Second quarter

- SYR - T. Jones 11 run (O. Mare kick)
- SYR - D. Maddox 8 pass from D. McNabb (O. Mare kick)
- ECU - L. Shannon 5 pass from M. Crandell (C. Holcomb kick)

Third quarter

- ECU - D. Batson 30 pass from M. Crandell (C. Holcomb kick)
- ECU - S. Richard 20 pass from M. Crandell (kick failed)
- SYR - O. Mare 24 FG

Fourth quarter

- ECU - J. McPhail 14 pass from M. Crandell (C. Holcomb kick)

=== Minnesota ===
Minnesota Golden Gophers at Syracuse Orangemen

Quarter	1	2	3	4	Total
Minnesota	3	7	7	0	17
Syracuse	3	10	14	0	27

at Carrier Dome, Syracuse, New York

- Date: September 23, 1995
- Game time: 12:00 p.m. EST
- Game attendance: 42,780
- TV: Creative
- Box Score

Game information
First quarter
- MIN - 6:58-Chalberg 27 FG
- SYR - 0:52-Mare 29 FG

Second quarter

- MIN - 11:23-Darkins 1 run (Chalberg kick)
- SYR - 8:24-Mare 48 FG
- SYR - 5:02-Harrison 94 punt return (Mare kick)

Third quarter

- SYR - 13:02-Thomas 14 run (Mare kick)
- SYR - 4:55-Harrison 30 pass from McNabb (Mare kick)
- MIN - 3:50-Nelson 13 pass from Sauter (Chalberg kick)

Fourth quarter

- No scoring

=== Rutgers ===
Syracuse Orangemen at Rutgers Scarlet Knights

Quarter	1	2	3	4	Total
Syracuse	0	3	14	10	27
Rutgers	7	10	0	0	17

at Rutgers Stadium, Piscataway, New Jersey

- Date: September 30, 1995
- Game time: 6:00 p.m. EST
- Game attendance: 32,832
- Recap pg. 123

Game information
First quarter
- RUT - Presley 1-yard run (Mike-Mayer kick)

Second quarter

- SYR - Mare 44-yard FG
- RUT - Lucas 4-yard run (Mike-Mayer kick)
- RUT - Mike-Mayer 32-yard FG

Third quarter

- SYR - Thomas 7-yard run (Mare kick)
- SYR - Harrison 8-yard pass from McNabb (Mare kick)

Fourth quarter

- SYR - Mare 32-yard FG
- SYR - Harrison 66-yard pass from McNabb (Mare kick)

=== Temple ===
Temple Owls at Syracuse Orangemen

Quarter	1	2	3	4	Total
Temple	0	7	0	7	14
Syracuse	7	7	9	8	31

at Carrier Dome, Syracuse, New York

- Date: October 7, 1995
- Game attendance: 40,646
- Box score

Game information
First quarter
- SYR - R. Williams 8 pass from D. McNabb (O. Mare kick)

Second quarter

- SYR - Jones 5 run (O. Mare kick)
- TEM - F. Carter 25 run (Michalski kick)

Third quarter

- SYR - FG O Mare 36
- SYR - McIntosh 47 run (kick failed)

Fourth quarter

- SYR - Harrison 42 pass from McNabb (McNabb reception for two-point conversion)
- TEM - K. Walker 3 pass from Burris (Michalski kick)

=== Eastern Michigan ===
Eastern Michigan Eagles at Syracuse Orangemen

Quarter	1	2	3	4	Total
Eastern Michigan	14	3	0	7	24
Syracuse	7	17	14	14	52

at Carrier Dome, Syracuse, New York

- Date: October 14, 1995
- Game time: 12:00 p.m.
- Game attendance: 38,902
- Box score

Game information
First quarter
- SYR - T. Jones 1 run (O. Mare kick)
- EMU - R. Granata 25 pass from C. Batch (J. Ventura kick)
- EMU - R. Wheatley 5 pass from Batch (J. Ventura kick)

Second quarter

- SYR - FG O Mare 39
- SYR - K. Sinceno 1 pass from D. McNabb (O. Mare kick)
- SYR - R. Konrad 3 run (O. Mare kick)
- EMU - Ventura 22 FG

Third quarter

- SYR - McIntosh 7 run (O. Mare kick)
- SYR - M. Harrison 13 pass from D. McNabb (O. Mare kick)

Fourth quarter

- SYR - T. Jones 1 run (O. Mare kick)
- SYR - K. Downing 6 run (O. Mare kick)
- EMU - W. Gutieriez 20 pass from M. Armour (J. Ventura kick)

=== West Virginia ===
West Virginia Mountaineers at Syracuse Orangemen

Quarter	1	2	3	4	Total
West Virginia	0	0	0	0	0
Syracuse	0	3	12	7	22

at Carrier Dome, Syracuse, New York

- Date: October 21, 1995
- Game time: 12:00 p.m. EST
- Game attendance: 48,880
- Box score

Game information
First quarter
- No scoring

Second quarter

- SYR - O. Mare 50-yard field goal

Third quarter

- SYR - D. Maddox 45-yard pass from D. McNabb (kick failed)
- SYR - D. McNabb 14-yard run (2-pt. conversion failed)

Fourth quarter

- SYR - M. Harrison 96-yard pass from D. McNabb (O. Mare kick)

=== Virginia Tech ===
#20 Syracuse Orangemen at Virginia Tech Hokies

Quarter	1	2	3	4	Total
Syracuse	7	0	0	0	7
Virginia Tech	0	17	7	7	31

at Lane Stadium, Blacksburg, Virginia

- Date: November 4, 1995
- Game time: 3:30 p.m. EST
- Game attendance: 51,239
- TV: ABC
- Box score

Game information
First quarter
- SYR - R. Konrad 19-yard run (O. Mare kick)

Second quarter

- VT - A. Larsen 21-yard field goal
- VT - B. Edmonds 25-yard pass from J. Druckenmiller (A. Larsen kick)
- VT - J. Holmes 29-yard pass from J. Druckenmiller (A. Larsen kick)

Third quarter

- VT - D. Thomas 25-yard pass from J. Druckenmiller (A. Larsen kick)

Fourth quarter

- VT - M. Parker 1-yard run (A. Larsen kick)

=== Pitt ===
#23 Syracuse Orangemen at Pitt Panthers

Quarter	1	2	3	4	Total
Syracuse	14	14	14	0	42
Pitt	0	7	0	3	10

at Pitt Stadium, Pittsburgh, Pennsylvania

- Date: November 11, 1995
- Game time: 12:00 p.m. EST
- Game attendance: 20,279
- Box score

Game information
First quarter
- SYR - M. Thomas 37-yard run (O. Mare kick)
- SYR - R. Konrad 1-yard run (O. Mare kick)

Second quarter

- SYR - M. Harrison 5-yard pass from D. McNabb
- PITT - D. Seagraves 4-yard pass from M. Lytle (C. Ferencik kick)
- SYR - R. Konrad 16-yard run (O. Mare kick)

Third quarter

- SYR - R. Konrad 58-yard run (O. Mare kick)
- SYR - M. Harrison 16-yard pass from D. McNabb (O. Mare kick)

Fourth quarter

- PITT - C. Ferencik 29-yard field goal

=== Boston College ===
Boston College Eagles at #23 Syracuse Orangemen

Quarter	1	2	3	4	Total
Boston College	0	15	0	14	29
Syracuse	23	14	7	14	58

at Carrier Dome, Syracuse, New York

- Date: November 18, 1995
- Game attendance: 49,384
- Box score

Game information
First quarter
- SYR - Konrad 2 run (O. Mare kick)
- SYR - FG O Mare 35
- SYR - Konrad 20 pass from D. McNabb (O. Mare kick)
- SYR - Konrad 27 run (kick failed)

Second quarter

- BC - King 21 pass from Hartsell (Harding reception for two-point conversion)
- SYR - Harrison 62 punt return (O. Mare kick)
- BC - Anderson 4 run (McGuire kick)
- SYR - S Wilson 9 pass from McNabb (O. Mare kick)

Third quarter

- SYR - R Williams 4 pass from McNabb (O. Mare kick)

Fourth quarter

- SYR - Thomas 21 run (O. Mare kick)
- BC - Cloud 6 run (Hemmert reception for two-point conversion)
- BC - Dragos 1 pass from Hartsell (two-point conversion failed)
- SYR - Thomas 4 run (O. Mare kick)

=== Miami (FL) ===
#22 Syracuse Orangemen at #25 Miami Hurricanes

Quarter	1	2	3	4	Total
Syracuse	10	14	0	0	24
Miami (FL)	0	14	14	7	35

at Miami Orange Bowl, Miami, Florida

- Date: November 25, 1995
- Game time: 7:30 p.m. EST
- Game attendance: 47,544
- Box score

Game information
First quarter
- SYR - M. Thomas 1 pass from D. McNabb (O. Mare kick)
- SYR - O. Mare 47 FG

Second quarter

- UM - D. Ferguson 2 run (D. Prewitt kick)
- SYR - D. McNabb 17 run (O. Mare kick)
- UM - D. Ferguson 3 run (D. Prewitt kick)
- SYR - Thomas 3 run (O. Mare kick)

Third quarter

- UM - Tucker 4 pass from R. Clement (D. Prewitt kick)
- UM - T. Jones 2 run (D. Prewitt kick)

Fourth quarter

- UM - O. Rolle 25 pass from D. McMillian (D. Prewitt kick)

=== 1996 Gator Bowl ===
Syracuse Orangemen vs. #23 Clemson Tigers

Quarter	1	2	3	4	Total
Syracuse	20	0	14	7	41
Clemson	0	0	0	0	0

at Jacksonville Municipal Stadium, Jacksonville, Florida

- Date: January 1, 1996
- Game time: 12:30p.m. EST
- Game attendance: 45,202
- Box score

Game information
First quarter
- SYR - M. Thomas 1-yard run (O. Mare kick)
- SYR - D. McNabb 5-yard run (kick blocked)
- SYR - M. Harrison 38-yard pass from D. McNabb (O. Mare kick)

Second quarter

- No scoring

Third quarter

- SYR - M. Thomas 2-yard run (O. Mare kick)
- SYR - M. Harrison 56-yard pass from D. McNabb (O. Mare kick)

Fourth quarter

- SYR - K. Sinceno 15-yard pass from D. McNabb (O. Mare kick)
