= 1995 Virginia Tech Hokies football team =

American college football season

1995 Virginia Tech Hokies football

Big East co-champion Sugar Bowl champion Lambert-Meadowlands Trophy

Sugar Bowl, W 28–10 vs. Texas
- Conference: Big East Conference

Ranking
- Coaches: No. 9
- AP: No. 10
- Record: 10–2 (6–1 Big East)
- Head coach: Frank Beamer (9th season)
- Offensive coordinator: Rickey Bustle (2nd season)
- Offensive scheme: Multiple
- Co-defensive coordinators: Bud Foster (1st season); Rod Sharpless (1st season)
- Base defense: 4–4
- Home stadium: Lane Stadium

1995 Big East Conference football standings
	Conf.			Overall
Team	W		L	W		L
No. 10 Virginia Tech +	6	–	1	10	–	2
No. 20 Miami (FL) +	6	–	1	8	–	3
No. 19 Syracuse	5	–	2	9	–	3
West Virginia	4	–	3	5	–	6
Boston College	4	–	3	4	–	8
Rutgers	2	–	5	4	–	7
Temple	1	–	6	1	–	10
Pittsburgh	0	–	7	2	–	9
+ – Conference co-champions; Rankings from AP Poll

The 1995 Virginia Tech Hokies football team represented Virginia Tech (formally the Virginia Polytechnic Institute and State University) as a member of the Big East Conference during the 1995 NCAA Division I-A football season. Led by ninth-year head coach Frank Beamer, the Hokies compiled an overall record of 10–2, with a mark of 6–1 in conference play, finished as Big East co-champion, and won the Sugar Bowl 28–10 over Texas. Virginia Tech played home games at Lane Stadium in Blacksburg, Virginia.

== Schedule ==
Date	Time	Opponent	Rank	Site	TV	Result	Attendance	Source
September 7	8:00 p.m.	Boston College	No. 20	Lane Stadium; Blacksburg, VA (rivalry)	ESPN	L 14–20	44,426	
September 16	12:00 p.m.	Cincinnati*		Lane Stadium; Blacksburg, VA		L 0–16	36,328	
September 23	12:00 p.m.	No. 17 Miami (FL)		Lane Stadium; Blacksburg, VA (rivalry)	BEN	W 13–7	51,206	
September 30	12:00 p.m.	at Pittsburgh		Pitt Stadium; Pittsburgh, PA	BEN	W 26–16	31,036	
October 7	1:30 p.m.	at Navy*		Navy–Marine Corps Memorial Stadium; Annapolis, MD		W 14–0	31,114	
October 14	1:00 p.m.	Akron*^{†}		Lane Stadium; Blacksburg, VA		W 77–27	40,688	
October 21	1:00 p.m.	at Rutgers		Rutgers Stadium; Piscataway, NJ		W 45–17	19,292	
October 28	12:00 p.m.	at West Virginia		Mountaineer Field; Morgantown, WV (rivalry)	BEN	W 27–0	59,819	
November 4	3:30 p.m.	No. 20 Syracuse		Lane Stadium; Blacksburg, VA	ABC	W 31–7	51,239	
November 11	1:00 p.m.	vs. Temple	No. 21	Robert F. Kennedy Memorial Stadium; Washington, DC		W 38–16	20,371	
November 18	12:00 p.m.	at No. 13 Virginia*	No. 20	Scott Stadium; Charlottesville, VA (rivalry)	ABC	W 36–29	43,600	
December 31	6:00 p.m.	vs. No. 9 Texas*	No. 13	Louisiana Superdome; New Orleans, LA (Sugar Bowl)	ABC	W 28–10	70,283	
*Non-conference game; ^{†}Homecoming; Rankings from AP Poll released prior to the game; All times are in Eastern time

== Rankings ==
Ranking movements Legend: ██ Increase in ranking ██ Decrease in ranking — = Not ranked
	Week																
Poll	Pre	1	2	3	4	5	6	7	8	9	10	11	12	13	14	15	Final
AP	24	24	20	—	—	—	—	—	—	—	—	21	20	13	13	13	10
Coaches Poll	—		22	—	—	—	—	—	—	—	—	19	18	11	11	11	9

== Game summaries ==
=== Boston College ===
Boston College Eagles at #22 Virginia Tech Hokies

Quarter	1	2	3	4	Total
Boston College	7	7	6	0	20
Virginia Tech	0	7	0	7	14

at Lane Stadium, Blacksburg, Virginia

- Date: September 7, 1995
- Game attendance: 44,426
- Box score

Game information
First quarter
- BC - Pollack 11 pass from Hartsell (McGuire kick)

Second quarter

- BC - Harding 4 pass from Hartsell (McGuire kick)
- VT - Still 80 pass from Druckenmiller (Larsen kick)

Third quarter

- BC - Hemmert 3 pass from Hartsell (kick failed)

Fourth quarter

- VT - B. Edmonds 1 run (Larsen kick)

=== Cincinnati ===
Cincinnati Bearcats at Virginia Tech Hokies

Quarter	1	2	3	4	Total
Cincinnati	0	16	0	0	16
Virginia Tech	0	0	0	0	0

at Lane Stadium, Blacksburg, Virginia

- Date: September 16, 1995
- Game attendance: 36,328
- Box score

Game information
First quarter
- No scoring

Second quarter

- CIN - B. Jackson 71-yard interception return (E. Richards kick)
- CIN - O. Smith 4-yard run (kick failed)
- CIN - E. Richards 41-yard field goal

Third quarter

- No scoring

Fourth quarter

- No scoring

=== Miami (FL) ===
#17 Miami Hurricanes at Virginia Tech Hokies

Quarter	1	2	3	4	Total
Miami (FL)	0	7	0	0	7
Virginia Tech	7	3	0	3	13

at Lane Stadium, Blacksburg, Virginia

- Date: September 23, 1995
- Game attendance: 51,206
- Box score

Game information
First quarter
- VT - D. Thomas 1-yard run (A. Larsen kick)

Second quarter

- VT - A. Larsen 44-yard field goal
- UM - D. Ferguson 5-yard run (D. Prewitt kick)

Third quarter

- No scoring

Fourth quarter

- VT - A. Larsen 20-yard field goal

=== Pitt ===
Virginia Tech Hokies at Pitt Panthers

Quarter	1	2	3	4	Total
Virginia Tech	0	0	10	16	26
Pitt	3	6	7	0	16

at Pitt Stadium, Pittsburgh, Pennsylvania

- Date: September 30, 1995
- Game time: 12:00 p.m. EST
- Game attendance: 31,036
- Box score

Game information
First quarter
- PITT - C. Ferencik 37-yard field goal

Second quarter

- PITT - C. Ferencik 40-yard field goal
- PITT - C. Ferencik 31-yard field goal

Third quarter

- VT - D. Thomas 15-yard run (A. Larsen kick)
- PITT - C. Schneider 2-yard run (C. Ferencik kick)
- VT - A. Larsen 34-yard field goal

Fourth quarter

- VT - A. Larsen 33-yard field goal
- VT - J. Holmes 73-yard pass from J. Druckenmiller (A. Larsen kick)
- VT - A. Larsen 26-yard field goal
- VT - A. Larsen 36-yard field goal

=== Navy ===
Virginia Tech Hokies at Navy Midshipmen

Quarter	1	2	3	4	Total
Virginia Tech	0	7	0	7	14
Navy	0	0	0	0	0

at Navy-Marine Corps Memorial Stadium, Annapolis, Maryland

- Date: October 7, 1995
- Game time: 1:30 p.m. EST
- Game attendance: 31,114
- Box score

Game information
First quarter
- No scoring

Second quarter

- VT - J. Holmes 16-yard pass from J. Druckenmiller (A. Larsen kick)

Third quarter

- No scoring
- VT - A. Larsen 34-yard field goal

Fourth quarter

- VT - D. Thomas 28-yard run (A. Larsen kick)

=== Akron ===
Akron Zips at Virginia Tech Hokies

Quarter	1	2	3	4	Total
Akron	0	0	20	7	27
Virginia Tech	26	21	16	14	77

at Lane Stadium, Blacksburg, Virginia

- Date: October 14, 1995
- Game time: 1:00 p.m. EST
- Game attendance: 40,688
- Box score

Game information
First quarter
- VT - Holmes recovered blocked punt in end zone (PAT blocked)
- VT - White 68 pass from Druckenmiller (two-point conversion failed)
- VT - Parker 6 run (Larsen kick)
- VT - White 18 pass from Druckenmiller (Larsen kick)

Second quarter

- VT - Oxendine 1 run (Larsen kick)
- VT - Clark 48 run (Larsen kick)
- VT - Thomas 8 run (Larsen kick)

Third quarter

- VT - Clark 58 run (Haug kick)
- VT - Safety
- AKR - Lawhorn 25 run (Lakab kick)
- VT - Oxendine 68 run (Haug kick)
- AKR - Lawhorn 61 pass from Junko (Jakab kick)
- AKR - Reader 13 pass from Junko (PAT blocked)

Fourth quarter

- AKR - Lawhorn 11 pass from Magrell (Jakab kick)
- VT - Parker 59 run (Haug kick)
- VT - Edwards 13 run (Haug kick)

=== Rutgers ===
Virginia Tech Hokies at Rutgers Scarlet Knights

Quarter	1	2	3	4	Total
Virginia Tech	7	7	17	14	45
Rutgers	3	7	0	7	17

at Rutgers Stadium, Piscataway, New Jersey

- Date: October 21, 1995
- Game time: 1:00 p.m. EST
- Game attendance: 19,292
- Recap pg. 124

Game information
First quarter
- RUT - Mike-Mayer 33-yard field goal
- VT - Oxendine 1-yard run (Larsen kick)

Second quarter

- RUT - Bosch 2-yard run (Mike-Mayer kick)
- VT - Still 7-yard pass from Druckenmiller (Larsen kick)

Third quarter

- VT - Larsen 27-yard field goal
- VT - Holmes 40-yard pass from Druckenmiller (Larsen kick)
- VT - D.Thomas 5-yard run (Larsen kick)

Fourth quarter

- RUT - Harper 9-yard pass from Lucas (Mike-Mayer kick)
- VT - Coleman 51-yard fumble return (Larsen kick)
- VT - Newsome 71-yard INT return (Larsen kick)

=== West Virginia ===
Virginia Tech Hokies at West Virginia Mountaineers

Quarter	1	2	3	4	Total
Virginia Tech	3	14	0	10	27
West Virginia	0	0	0	0	0

at Mountaineer Field, Morgantown, West Virginia

- Date: October 28, 1995
- Game time: 12:00 p.m.
- Game attendance: 59,819
- Box Score

Game information
First quarter
- VT - A. Larsen 43-yard field goal

Second quarter

- VT - D. Thomas 8-yard run (A. Larsen kick)
- VT - L. Green 37-yard interception return (A. Larsen kick)

Third quarter

- No scoring

Fourth quarter

- VT - B. Jennings 37-yard pass from J. Druckenmiller (A. Larsen kick)
- VT - A. Larsen 39-yard field goal

=== Syracuse ===
#20 Syracuse Orangemen at Virginia Tech Hokies

Quarter	1	2	3	4	Total
Syracuse	7	0	0	0	7
Virginia Tech	0	17	7	7	31

at Lane Stadium, Blacksburg, Virginia

- Date: November 4, 1995
- Game time: 3:30 p.m. EST
- Game attendance: 51,239
- TV: ABC
- Box score

Game information
First quarter
- SYR - R. Konrad 19-yard run (O. Mare kick)

Second quarter

- VT - A. Larsen 21-yard field goal
- VT - B. Edmonds 25-yard pass from J. Druckenmiller (A. Larsen kick)
- VT - J. Holmes 29-yard pass from J. Druckenmiller (A. Larsen kick)

Third quarter

- VT - D. Thomas 25-yard pass from J. Druckenmiller (A. Larsen kick)

Fourth quarter

- VT - M. Parker 1-yard run (A. Larsen kick)

=== Temple ===
Temple Owls vs. Virginia Tech Hokies

Quarter	1	2	3	4	Total
Temple	6	3	0	7	16
Virginia Tech	10	21	0	7	38

at RFK Stadium, Washington, DC

- Date: November 11, 1995
- Game attendance: 20,371
- Box score

Game information
First quarter
- VT - FG Larsen 19
- TEM - FG Michalski 41
- TEM - FG Michalski 31
- VT - Still 35 pass from Druckenmiller (Larsen kick)

Second quarter

- VT - Baron 46 fumble return (Larsen kick)
- VT - Price 19 interception return (Larsen kick)
- TEM - FG Michalski 44
- VT - Parker 2 run (Larsen kick)

Third quarter

- No scoring

Fourth quarter

- VT - Parker 1 run (Larsen kick)
- TEM - Kersey 18 pass from Burris (Michalski kick)

=== Virginia ===
#20 Virginia Tech Hokies at #13 Virginia Cavaliers

Quarter	1	2	3	4	Total
Virginia Tech	14	0	0	22	36
Virginia	7	15	7	0	29

at Scott Stadium, Charlottesville, Virginia

- Date: November 18, 1995
- Game time: 12:00 p.m.
- Game attendance: 43,600
- Box Score

Game information
First quarter
- UVA - G Crowell 29 pass from Groh (R. Garcia kick)
- VT - Oxendine 1 run (Larsen kick)
- VT - Thomas 2 run (Larsen kick)

Second quarter

- UVA - Medley 2 pass from Sherman (Neely reception for two-point conversion)
- UVA - G. Crowell 41 pass from Sherman (R. Garcia kick)

Third quarter

- UVA - T. Barber 9 run (R. Garcia kick)

Fourth quarter

- VT - Holmes 10 pass from Druckenmiller (two-point conversion failed)
- VT - Larsen 35 FG
- VT - Holmes 42 pass from Druckenmiller (Larsen kick)
- VT - Banks 65 interception return (Larsen kick)

=== 1995 Sugar Bowl ===
#13 Virginia Tech Hokies vs. #9 Texas Longhorns

Quarter	1	2	3	4	Total
Virginia Tech	0	7	7	14	28
Texas	7	3	0	0	10

at Louisiana Superdome, New Orleans, Louisiana

- Date: December 31, 1995
- Game time: 12:00 p.m.
- Game attendance: 70,283
- Box Score

Game information
First quarter
- TEX - Fitzgerald 4-yard pass from Brown (Dawson kick)

Second quarter

- TEX - Dawson 52-yard field goal
- VT - Still 60-yard punt return (Larsen kick)

Third quarter

- VT - Parker 2-yard run (Larsen kick)

Fourth quarter

- VT - Still 54-yard pass from Druckenmiller (Larsen kick)
- VT - Baron 20-yard fumble return (Larsen kick)

== Roster ==
1995 Virginia Tech Hokies football team roster
Players
Coaches
Offense

Pos.	#	Name	Class
C	63	Bill Conaty
G	64	Gennaro DiNapoli	So
QB	16	Jim Druckenmiller	Jr
TE	81	Bryan Jennings	Jr
RB	28	Ken Oxendine	So
WR	17	Bryan Still
RB	42	Dwayne Thomas
G	75	Todd Washington	So

Defense

Pos.	#	Name	Class
CB	9	Antonio Banks
LB	41	George DelRicco
S	14	Torrian Gray
DE	58	Cornell Brown
DT	59	J. C. Price
FS	24	William Yarborough

Special teams

Pos.	#	Name	Class
K	18	Atle Larsen
P	3	John Thomas

Head coach

- Frank Beamer

Coordinators/assistant coaches

Legend

- (C) Team captain
- (S) Suspended
- (I) Ineligible
- Injured
- Redshirt
