= 1995 Duke Blue Devils football team =

American college football season

1995 Duke Blue Devils football
- Conference: Atlantic Coast Conference
- Record: 3–8 (1–7 ACC)
- Head coach: Fred Goldsmith (2nd season)
- Offensive coordinator: John Zernhelt (1st season)
- Defensive coordinator: Jeff McInerney (1st season)
- MVP: Ray Farmer
- Captains: Spence Fischer; Jon Merrill
- Home stadium: Wallace Wade Stadium

1995 Atlantic Coast Conference football standings
	Conf.			Overall
Team	W		L	W		L
No. 4 Florida State +	7	–	1	10	–	2
No. 16 Virginia +	7	–	1	9	–	4
Clemson	6	–	2	8	–	4
Georgia Tech	5	–	3	6	–	5
North Carolina	4	–	4	7	–	5
Maryland	4	–	4	6	–	5
NC State	2	–	6	3	–	8
Duke	1	–	7	3	–	8
Wake Forest	0	–	8	1	–	10
+ – Conference co-champions; Rankings from AP Poll

The 1995 Duke Blue Devils football team represented Duke University as a member of the Atlantic Coast Conference (ACC) during the 1995 NCAA Division I-A football season. Led by second-year head coach Fred Goldsmith, the Blue Devils compiled an overall record of 3–8 with a mark of 1–7 in conference play, and finished eighth in the ACC. Duke played home games at Wallace Wade Stadium in Durham, North Carolina.

== Schedule ==
Date	Time	Opponent	Site	TV	Result	Attendance	Source
September 2	3:30 p.m.	vs. No. 1 Florida State	Florida Citrus Bowl; Orlando, FL	ABC	L 26–70	51,200	
September 9		Rutgers*	Wallace Wade Stadium; Durham, NC		W 24–14	25,400	
September 16		at Army*	Michie Stadium; West Point, NY		W 23–21	33,031	
September 23		at No. 24 Maryland	Byrd Stadium; College Park, MD		L 28–41	41,013	
September 30		Navy*	Wallace Wade Stadium; Durham, NC		L 9–30	29,400	
October 7		Georgia Tech^{†}	Wallace Wade Stadium; Durham, NC		L 21–37	20,110	
October 14	1:30 p.m.	at No. 19 Virginia	Scott Stadium; Charlottesville, VA		L 30–44	40,200	
October 21	1:00 p.m.	NC State	Wallace Wade Stadium; Durham, NC (rivalry)		L 38–41	24,117	
October 28	1:30 p.m.	Wake Forest	Wallace Wade Stadium; Durham, NC (rivalry)		W 42–26	31,752	
November 11	1:00 p.m.	at No. 24 Clemson	Memorial Stadium; Clemson, SC		L 17–34	63,000	
November 18	12:00 p.m.	at North Carolina	Kenan Memorial Stadium; Chapel Hill, NC (Victory Bell)	JPS	L 24–28	47,000	
*Non-conference game; ^{†}Homecoming; Rankings from AP Poll released prior to the game; All times are in Eastern time
