= 1996 Orange Bowl (January) =

1996 FedEx Orange Bowl
- 62nd Orange Bowl
- The Miami Orange Bowl in Miami, Florida, hosted the Orange Bowl.
Florida State Seminoles	Notre Dame Fighting Irish
(9–2)	(9–2)
ACC	Independent
31	26
Head coach: Bobby Bowden	Head coach: Lou Holtz
AP / Coaches / BA; 8 / 8 / 9	AP / Coaches / BA; 6 / 9 / 8
	1	2	3	4	Total
Florida State	7	7	0	17	31
Notre Dame	10	0	7	9	26
- Date: January 1, 1996
- Season: 1995
- Stadium: Miami Orange Bowl
- Location: Miami, Florida
- MVP: FSU WR Andre Cooper and Notre Dame WR Derrick Mayes
- Favorite: FSU by 10.5
- Referee: Jimmy Harper (SEC)
- Attendance: 72,198

United States TV coverage
- Network: CBS
- Announcers: Sean McDonough and Pat Haden
- Nielsen ratings: 12.5

The 62nd Orange Bowl was a post-season college football bowl game between the Florida State Seminoles and the Notre Dame Fighting Irish on January 1, 1996, at The Orange Bowl in Miami, Florida. Florida State defeated Notre Dame, 31-26. The game was part of the 1995-1996 Bowl Alliance of the 1995 NCAA Division I-A football season and represented the concluding game of the season for both teams. The Orange Bowl was first played in 1935, and the 1996 game represented the 62nd edition of the Orange Bowl. The contest was televised in the United States on CBS.

This would be the last Orange Bowl played in the Orange Bowl Stadium until 1999, as the next three were played in Pro Player Stadium, before moving the game there permanently after the 1999 season.

Florida State capped off this Orange Bowl with their 14th straight bowl game without a loss (December 1982 through January 1996).

Referee Jimmy Harper of the Southeastern Conference retired after calling his fourth Orange Bowl in 13 seasons, including the legendary 1984 game which saw the Miami Hurricanes win the first of their five national championship by upending then-No. 1 Nebraska 31-30.
