= 1995 Georgia Tech Yellow Jackets football team =

American college football season

1995 Georgia Tech Yellow Jackets football
- Conference: Atlantic Coast Conference
- Record: 6–5 (5–3 ACC)
- Head coach: George O'Leary (2nd season)
- Offensive coordinator: Pat Watson (1st season)
- Defensive coordinator: Brian Baker (1st season)
- Home stadium: Bobby Dodd Stadium

1995 Atlantic Coast Conference football standings
	Conf.			Overall
Team	W		L	W		L
No. 4 Florida State +	7	–	1	10	–	2
No. 16 Virginia +	7	–	1	9	–	4
Clemson	6	–	2	8	–	4
Georgia Tech	5	–	3	6	–	5
North Carolina	4	–	4	7	–	5
Maryland	4	–	4	6	–	5
NC State	2	–	6	3	–	8
Duke	1	–	7	3	–	8
Wake Forest	0	–	8	1	–	10
+ – Conference co-champions; Rankings from AP Poll

The 1995 Georgia Tech Yellow Jackets football team represented Georgia Tech as member of the Atlantic Coast Conference (ACC) during the 1995 NCAA Division I-A football season. Led by second-year head coach George O'Leary, the Yellow Jackets compiled an overall record of 6–5 with a mark of 5–3 in conference play, placing fourth in the ACC. Georgia Tech played home games at Bobby Dodd Stadium in Atlanta.

== Schedule ==
Date	Time	Opponent	Site	TV	Result	Attendance	Source
September 2		Furman*	Bobby Dodd Stadium; Atlanta, GA		W 51–7	38,511	
September 7		at No. 17 Arizona*	Arizona Stadium; Tucson, AZ		L 19–20	46,786	
September 16	1:30 pm	at No. 16 Virginia	Scott Stadium; Charlottesville, VA		L 14–41	36,500	
September 28	8:00 pm	No. 17 Maryland	Bobby Dodd Stadium; Atlanta, GA	ESPN	W 31–3	44,137	
October 7		at Duke	Wallace Wade Stadium; Durham, NC		W 37–21	20,110	
October 14	12:00 pm	North Carolina	Bobby Dodd Stadium; Atlanta, GA	JPS	W 27–25	40,201	
October 21	3:30 pm	at No. 1 Florida State	Doak Campbell Stadium; Tallahassee, FL	ABC	L 10–42	76,400	
October 28	12:00 pm	Clemson	Bobby Dodd Stadium; Atlanta, GA (rivalry)	JPS	L 3–24	45,245	
November 4	1:00 pm	at Wake Forest	Groves Stadium; Winston-Salem, NC		W 24–23	23,114	
November 11	1:00 pm	NC State	Bobby Dodd Stadium; Atlanta, GA		W 27–19	33,121	
November 23	11:00 am	Georgia*	Bobby Dodd Stadium; Atlanta, GA (Clean, Old-Fashioned Hate)	ABC	L 17–18	45,245	
*Non-conference game; Rankings from AP Poll released prior to the game; All times are in Eastern time

== Roster ==
1995 Georgia Tech Yellow Jackets football team roster
Players
Coaches
Offense

Pos.	#	Name	Class
C	65	Michael Cheever
TB	3	Charlie Rogers	Fr
FL	9	Derrick Steagall	Jr

Defense

Pos.	#	Name	Class

Special teams

Pos.	#	Name	Class

Head coach

- George O'Leary

Coordinators/assistant coaches

- Pat Watson – Offensive coordinator/offensive line
- Eddie Wilson – Quarterbacks
- Bob Casullo – Running backs/special teams
- Stan Hixon – Wide receivers
- Lance Thompson – Tight ends/recruiting coordinator
- Brian Baker – Defensive coordinator/outside linebackers
- Larry New – Defensive line/assistant head coach
- Dave Huxtable – Inside linebackers
- John Anselmo – Defensive backs

Legend

- (C) Team captain
- (S) Suspended
- (I) Ineligible
- Injured
- Redshirt
