= 1995 NC State Wolfpack football team =

American college football team season

1995 NC State Wolfpack football
- Conference: Atlantic Coast Conference
- Record: 3–8 (2–6 ACC)
- Head coach: Mike O'Cain (3rd season)
- Offensive coordinator: Ted Cain (10th season)
- Defensive coordinator: Ken Pettus (2nd season)
- Home stadium: Carter–Finley Stadium

1995 Atlantic Coast Conference football standings
| | Conf. | | | Overall |
| Team | W | | L | W | | L |
|---|---|---|---|---|---|---|
| No. 4 Florida State + | 7 | – | 1 | 10 | – | 2 |
| No. 16 Virginia + | 7 | – | 1 | 9 | – | 4 |
| Clemson | 6 | – | 2 | 8 | – | 4 |
| Georgia Tech | 5 | – | 3 | 6 | – | 5 |
| North Carolina | 4 | – | 4 | 7 | – | 5 |
| Maryland | 4 | – | 4 | 6 | – | 5 |
| NC State | 2 | – | 6 | 3 | – | 8 |
| Duke | 1 | – | 7 | 3 | – | 8 |
| Wake Forest | 0 | – | 8 | 1 | – | 10 |
+ – Conference co-champions; Rankings from AP Poll

The 1995 NC State Wolfpack football team represented North Carolina State University during the 1995 NCAA Division I-A football season. The team's head coach was Mike O'Cain. NC State has been a member of the Atlantic Coast Conference (ACC) since the league's inception in 1953. The Wolfpack played its home games in 1995 at Carter–Finley Stadium in Raleigh, North Carolina, which has been NC State football's home stadium since 1966.

== Schedule ==
| Date | Time | Opponent | Rank | Site | TV | Result | Attendance | Source |
|---|---|---|---|---|---|---|---|---|
| August 31 | 7:30 pm | Marshall* | | Carter–Finley Stadium; Raleigh, NC | | W 33–16 | 44,259 | |
| September 9 | 4:00 pm | No. 16 Virginia | No. 23 | Carter–Finley Stadium; Raleigh, NC | | L 24–29 | 47,718 | |
| September 16 | 12:00 pm | at No. 1 Florida State | | Doak Campbell Stadium; Tallahassee, FL | JPS | L 17–77 | 72,800 | |
| September 23 | 1:00 pm | Baylor* | | Carter–Finley Stadium; Raleigh, NC | Raycom | L 0–14 | 39,950 | |
| September 30 | 1:00 pm | Clemson | | Carter–Finley Stadium; Raleigh, NC (Textile Bowl) | | L 22–43 | 46,074 | |
| October 7 | 3:30 pm | at No. 16 Alabama* | | Bryant–Denny Stadium; Tuscaloosa, AL | PPV | L 11–27 | 70,123 | |
| October 21 | 1:00 pm | Duke | | Wallace Wade Stadium; Durham, NC (rivalry) | | W 41–38 | 24,117 | |
| November 4 | 1:00 pm | Maryland | | Carter–Finley Stadium; Raleigh, NC | | L 13–30 | 45,652 | |
| November 11 | 1:00 pm | at Georgia Tech | | Bobby Dodd Stadium; Atlanta, GA | | L 19–27 | 33,121 | |
| November 18 | 1:00 pm | at Wake Forest | | Groves Stadium; Winston-Salem, NC (rivalry) | | W 52–23 | 18,218 | |
| November 24 | 11:00 am | North Carolina | | Carter–Finley Stadium; Raleigh, NC (rivalry) | ABC | L 28–30 | 48,100 | |
*Non-conference game; Rankings from AP Poll released prior to the game; All times are in Eastern time
