= 1995 West Virginia Mountaineers football team =

American college football season

1995 West Virginia Mountaineers football
- Conference: Big East Conference
- Record: 5–6 (4–3 Big East)
- Head coach: Don Nehlen (16th season)
- Offensive coordinator: Dan Simrell (1st season)
- Defensive coordinator: Steve Dunlap (4th season)
- Home stadium: Mountaineer Field

1995 Big East Conference football standings
	Conf.			Overall
Team	W		L	W		L
No. 10 Virginia Tech +	6	–	1	10	–	2
No. 20 Miami (FL) +	6	–	1	8	–	3
No. 19 Syracuse	5	–	2	9	–	3
West Virginia	4	–	3	5	–	6
Boston College	4	–	3	4	–	8
Rutgers	2	–	5	4	–	7
Temple	1	–	6	1	–	10
Pittsburgh	0	–	7	2	–	9
+ – Conference co-champions; Rankings from AP Poll

The 1995 West Virginia Mountaineers football team represented West Virginia University as a member of the Big East Conference during the 1995 NCAA Division I-A football season. Led by 16th-year head coach Don Nehlen, the Mountaineers compiled an overall record of 5–6 with a mark of 4–3 in conference play, tying for fourth place in the Big East. The team played home games at Mountaineer Field in Morgantown, West Virginia.

== Schedule ==
Date	Time	Opponent	Rank	Site	TV	Result	Attendance	Source
September 2	12:00 p.m.	Purdue*	No. 23	Mountaineer Field; Morgantown, WV	BEN	L 24–26	60,876	
September 9	12:00 p.m.	Temple		Mountaineer Field; Morgantown, WV	BEN	W 24–13	53,024	
September 16	7:00 p.m.	at Maryland*		Byrd Stadium; College Park, MD (rivalry)		L 17–31	48,055	
September 23	1:00 p.m.	Kent State*		Mountaineer Field; Morgantown, WV		W 45–6	46,624	
September 30	12:00 p.m.	at East Carolina*		Dowdy–Ficklen Stadium; Greenville, NC		L 20–23	34,108	
October 14	12:00 p.m.	at Boston College		Alumni Stadium; Chestnut Hill, MA	BEN	W 31–19	44,500	
October 21	12:00 p.m.	at Syracuse		Carrier Dome; Syracuse, NY (rivalry)	BEN	L 0–22	48,880	
October 28	12:00 p.m.	Virginia Tech		Mountaineer Field; Morgantown, WV (rivalry)	BEN	L 0–27	59,819	
November 4	12:00 p.m.	Rutgers		Mountaineer Field; Morgantown, WV		W 59–26	42,642	
November 18	4:00 p.m.	at No. 25 Miami (FL)		Miami Orange Bowl; Miami, FL		L 12–17	43,409	
November 24	4:00 p.m.	Pittsburgh		Mountaineer Field; Morgantown, WV (Backyard Brawl)	ESPN	W 21–0	38,795	
*Non-conference game; Rankings from AP Poll released prior to the game; All times are in Eastern time

== Game summaries ==
=== Purdue ===
Purdue Boilermakers at West Virginia Mountaineers

Quarter	1	2	3	4	Total
Purdue	10	9	0	7	26
West Virginia	0	0	14	10	24

at Mountaineer Field, Morgantown, West Virginia

- Date: September 2, 1995
- Game time: 12:00 p.m. EST
- Game attendance: 60,876
- Box Score

Game information

First quarter

- PUR - Bobich 37 yard field goal
- PUR - Alford 18 yard pass from Trefzger (Bobich kick)

Second quarter

- PUR - Bobich 24 yard field goal
- PUR - Rogers 17 yard run (two-point conversion failed)

Third quarter

- WVU - Walker 4 yard run (Baumann kick)
- WVU - Walker 8 yard run (Baumann kick)

Fourth quarter

- WVU - Baumann 43 yard field goal
- PUR - Rogers 1 yard run (Bobich kick)
- WVU - Walker 8 yard run (Baumann kick)
- PUR - Mike Alstott 17 Rush, 109 Yds

=== Temple ===
Temple Owls at West Virginia Mountaineers

Quarter	1	2	3	4	Total
Temple	0	7	0	6	13
West Virginia	0	7	10	7	24

at Mountaineer Field, Morgantown, West Virginia

- Date: September 9, 1995
- Game time: 12:00 p.m.
- Game attendance: 53,024
- Box score

Game information
First quarter
- No scoring

Second quarter

- TEM - Lee 1 run (Michalski kick)
- WVU - Gary 2 run (Br. Baumann kick)

Third quarter

- WVU - FG Br. Baumann 36
- WVU - Barber 1 run (Br. Baumann kick)

Fourth quarter

- WVU - Purnell 30 pass from Johnston (Br. Baumann kick)
- TEM - Lee 1 run (two-point conversion failed)

=== Maryland ===
West Virginia Mountaineers at Maryland Terrapins

Quarter	1	2	3	4	Total
West Virginia	3	7	7	0	17
Maryland	14	0	17	0	31

at Byrd Stadium, College Park, Maryland

- Date: September 16, 1995
- Game time: 7:00 p.m. EST
- Game weather: 68 °F (20 °C), steady rain, wind NE 12 mph (19 km/h)
- Game attendance: 48,055
- Recap, pg. 122

Game information
First quarter
- WVU - B. Baumann 35-yard field goal
- UMD - Buddy Rodgers 54-yard run (Joe O'Donnell kick)

Second quarter

- WVU - A. Beasley 49-yard interception return (B. Baumann kick)

Third quarter

- UMD - Mancel Johnson 24-yard pass from Brian Cummings (Joe O'Donnell kick)
- UMD - Joe O'Donnell 47-yard field goal
- WVU - L. Purnell 17-yard pass from C. Johnston (B. Baumann kick)
- UMD - Jermaine Lewis 11-yard pass from Brian Cummings (Joe O'Donnell kick)

Fourth quarter

- No scoring

=== Kent State ===
Kent State Golden Flashes at West Virginia Mountaineers

Quarter	1	2	3	4	Total
Kent State	0	0	0	6	6
West Virginia	0	14	17	14	45

at Mountaineer Field, Morgantown, West Virginia

- Date: September 23, 1995
- Game time: 1:00 p.m.
- Game attendance: 46,624
- Box score

Game information
First quarter
- No scoring

Second quarter

- WVU - Purnell 16 pass from Johnston (Baumann kick)
- WVU - Vanterpool 8 pass from Johnston (Baumann kick)

Third quarter

- WVU - FG Baumann 26
- WVU - Barber 3 run (Baumann kick)
- WVU - Gary 25 run (Baumann kick)

Fourth quarter

- WVU - Vanterpool 47 pass from Boykin (Baumann kick)
- KENT - Walker 2 run (kick failed)
- WVU - Minneyfield 32 pass from Boykin (Baumann kick)

=== East Carolina ===
West Virginia Mountaineers at East Carolina Pirates

Quarter	1	2	3	4	Total
West Virginia	3	6	8	3	20
East Carolina	14	6	0	3	23

at Dowdy-Ficklen Stadium, Greenville, North Carolina

- Date: September 30, 1995
- Game time: 12:00 p.m. EST
- Game attendance: 34,108
- Box score

Game information
First quarter
- WVU - FG Br. Baumann 33
- ECU - Shannon 67 pass from M Crandell (Holcomb kick)
- ECU - M. Crandell 10 run (Holcomb kick)

Second quarter

- ECU - Shannon 9 pass from M. Crandell (kick failed)
- WVU - Barber 2 run (two-point conversion failed)

Third quarter

- WVU - Saunders 50 pass from Boykin (two-point conversion failed)
- WVU - Safety, M. Crandell tackled in end zone

Fourth quarter

- WVU - FG Br. Baumann 31
- ECU - FG Holcomb 27

=== Boston College ===
West Virginia Mountaineers at Boston College Eagles

Quarter	1	2	3	4	Total
West Virginia	10	0	14	7	31
Boston College	0	0	6	13	19

at Alumni Stadium, Chestnut Hill, Massachusetts

- Date: October 14, 1995
- Game time: 12:00 p.m.
- Game attendance: 44,500
- Box score

Game information
First quarter
- WVU - K. Barber 1-yard pass from C. Johnston (B. Baumann kick)
- WVU - B. Baumann 22-yard field goal

Second quarter

- No scoring

Third quarter

- WVU - R. Vanterpool 36-yard pass from C. Johnston (B. Baumann kick)
- WVU - K. Barber 24-yard run (B. Baumann kick)
- BC - K. Watson 84-yard punt return (2-pt. conversion failed)

Fourth quarter

- BC - K. Watson 30-yard pass from T. Pollack (2-pt. conversion failed)
- WVU - R. Walker 1-yard run (B. Baumann kick)
- BC - T. Pollack 1-yard pass from M. Hasselbeck (D. McGuire kick)

=== Syracuse ===
West Virginia Mountaineers at Syracuse Orangemen

Quarter	1	2	3	4	Total
West Virginia	0	0	0	0	0
Syracuse	0	3	12	7	22

at Carrier Dome, Syracuse, New York

- Date: October 21, 1995
- Game time: 12:00 p.m. EST
- Game attendance: 48,880
- Box score

Game information
First quarter
- No scoring

Second quarter

- SYR - O. Mare 50-yard field goal

Third quarter

- SYR - D. Maddox 45-yard pass from D. McNabb (kick failed)
- SYR - D. McNabb 14-yard run (2-pt. conversion failed)

Fourth quarter

- SYR - M. Harrison 96-yard pass from D. McNabb (O. Mare kick)

=== Virginia Tech ===
Virginia Tech Hokies at West Virginia Mountaineers

Quarter	1	2	3	4	Total
Virginia Tech	3	14	0	10	27
West Virginia	0	0	0	0	0

at Mountaineer Field, Morgantown, West Virginia

- Date: October 28, 1995
- Game time: 12:00 p.m.
- Game attendance: 59,819
- Box Score

Game information
First quarter
- VT - A. Larsen 43-yard field goal

Second quarter

- VT - D. Thomas 8-yard run (A. Larsen kick)
- VT - L. Green 37-yard interception return (A. Larsen kick)

Third quarter

- No scoring

Fourth quarter

- VT - B. Jennings 37-yard pass from J. Druckenmiller (A. Larsen kick)
- VT - A. Larsen 39-yard field goal

=== Rutgers ===
Rutgers Scarlet Knights at West Virginia Mountaineers

Quarter	1	2	3	4	Total
Rutgers	6	6	7	7	26
West Virginia	10	21	14	14	59

at Mountaineer Field, Morgantown, West Virginia

- Date: November 4, 1995
- Game time: 12:00 p.m. EST
- Game attendance: 42,642
- Recap, pg. 125

Game information
First quarter
- WVU - Purnell 49-yard pass from Johnston (Baumann kick)
- WVU - Baumann 25-yard field goal
- RUT - Harper 77-yard pass from Lucas (kick failed)

Second quarter

- WVU Gary 17-yard run (Baumann kick)
- WVU - Gary 1-yard run (Baumann kick)
- RUT - Lucas 4-yard run (kick failed)
- WVU - Gary 2-yard run (Baumann kick)

Third quarter

- WVU - Saunders 21-yard pass from Johnston (Baumann kick)
- RUT - Harper 28-yard pass from Lucas (Kucowski kick)
- WVU - Purnell 76-yard pass from Johnston (Baumann kick)

Fourth quarter

- WVU - Saunders 32-yard pass from Johnston (Baumann kick)
- RUT - Presley 1-yard run (Kucowski kick)
- WVU - White 60-yard run (Baumann kick)

=== Miami (FL) ===
West Virginia Mountaineers at #25 Miami Hurricanes

Quarter	1	2	3	4	Total
West Virginia	0	9	3	0	12
Miami (FL)	0	7	7	3	17

at Miami Orange Bowl, Miami, Florida

- Date: October 21, 1995
- Game time: 4:00 p.m. EST
- Game attendance: 43,409
- Box score

Game information
First quarter
- No scoring

Second quarter

- WVU - B. Baumann 19-yard field goal
- UM - D. Harris 6-yard run (D. Prewitt kick)
- WVU - D. Saunders 28-yard pass from C. Johnston (kick failed)

Third quarter

- UM - C. Joseph 17-yard run (D. Prewitt kick)
- WVU - B. Baumann 36-yard field goal

Fourth quarter

- UM - D. Prewitt 33-yard field goal

=== Pittsburgh ===
Pitt Panthers at West Virginia Mountaineers

Quarter	1	2	3	4	Total
Pitt	0	0	0	0	0
West Virginia	0	14	7	0	21

at Mountaineer Field, Morgantown, West Virginia

- Date: November 24, 1995
- Game time: 4:00 p.m. EST
- Game attendance: 38,795
- Box score

Game information
First quarter
- No scoring

Second quarter

- WVU - Gray 14-yard run (Baumann kick)
- WVU - Saunder 29-yard pass from Johnston (Baumann kick)

Third quarter

- WVU - Purnell 7-yard pass from Johnston (Baumann kic)

Fourth quarter

- No scoring

== Roster ==
1995 West Virginia Mountaineers football team roster
Players
Coaches
Offense

Pos.	#	Name	Class
QB	8	Chad Johnston	Jr
TE	82	Lovett Purnell	Sr

Defense

Pos.	#	Name	Class
DB	23	Mike Logan	Jr
CB	32	Aaron Beasley	Sr
LB	91	Bernard Russ	Jr
DT	92	Henry Slay	So
DT	93	John Browning	Sr
DT	96	John Thornton	Fr

Special teams

Pos.	#	Name	Class

Head coach

- Don Nehlen

Coordinators/assistant coaches

Legend

- (C) Team captain
- (S) Suspended
- (I) Ineligible
- Injured
- Redshirt
