= 1995 Boston College Eagles football team =

American college football season

1995 Boston College Eagles football
- Conference: Big East Conference
- Record: 4–8 (4–3 Big East)
- Head coach: Dan Henning (2nd season)
- Offensive coordinator: Dirk Koetter (2nd season)
- Offensive scheme: Pro-style
- Defensive coordinator: Jack Stanton (1st season)
- Base defense: 4–3
- Captains: Pete Kendall; Tim Morabito
- Home stadium: Alumni Stadium

1995 Big East Conference football standings
	Conf.			Overall
Team	W		L	W		L
No. 10 Virginia Tech +	6	–	1	10	–	2
No. 20 Miami (FL) +	6	–	1	8	–	3
No. 19 Syracuse	5	–	2	9	–	3
West Virginia	4	–	3	5	–	6
Boston College	4	–	3	4	–	8
Rutgers	2	–	5	4	–	7
Temple	1	–	6	1	–	10
Pittsburgh	0	–	7	2	–	9
+ – Conference co-champions; Rankings from AP Poll

The 1995 Boston College Eagles football team represented Boston College in the 1995 NCAA Division I-A football season. The Eagles were led by second-year head coach Dan Henning and played their home games at Alumni Stadium in Chestnut Hill, Massachusetts. Despite high preseason expectations, Boston College finished with a disappointing overall record of 4–8 (4–3 Big East), tied for 4th in the Big East Conference.

== Schedule ==
Date	Time	Opponent	Rank	Site	TV	Result	Attendance	Source
August 27		vs. No. 12 Ohio State*	No. 22	Giants Stadium; East Rutherford, NJ (Kickoff Classic)		L 6–38	62,711	
September 7		at No. 20 Virginia Tech		Lane Stadium; Blacksburg, VA (rivalry)		W 20–14	44,426	
September 16		No. 11 Michigan*		Alumni Stadium; Chestnut Hill, MA		L 13–23	44,500	
September 30		at Michigan State*		Spartan Stadium; East Lansing, MI		L 21–25	72,981	
October 7		Pittsburgh		Alumni Stadium; Chestnut Hill, MA		W 17–0	44,500	
October 14		West Virginia		Alumni Stadium; Chestnut Hill, MA		L 19–31	44,500	
October 21		Army*		Alumni Stadium; Chestnut Hill, MA		L 7–49	44,500	
October 28	2:30 p.m.	at No. 12 Notre Dame*		Notre Dame Stadium; Notre Dame, IN (Holy War)	NBC	L 10–20	59,075	
November 4		at Temple		Veterans Stadium; Philadelphia, PA		W 10–9	5,182	
November 11		Miami (FL)		Alumni Stadium; Chestnut Hill, MA		L 14–17	44,500	
November 18		at No. 23 Syracuse		Carrier Dome; Syracuse, NY		L 29–58	49,384	
November 24		at Rutgers		Rutgers Stadium; Piscataway, NJ		W 41–38	20,114	
*Non-conference game; Rankings from AP Poll released prior to the game; All times are in Eastern time

== Roster ==
1995 Boston College Eagles football team roster
Players
Coaches
Offense

Pos.	#	Name	Class
TE	83	Scott Dragos	So
QB	10	Mark Hartsell	Sr
QB	7	Matt Hasselbeck	So
G	66	Pete Kendall	Sr
OT	70	Dan Oriskovich	Jr

Defense

Pos.	#	Name	Class
DT	73	John Coleman	Jr
DE	99	Stalin Colinet	Jr
DT	58	Tim Morabito	Sr
DB	44	Daryl Porter	Jr
DT	93	Chris Sullivan	Sr

Special teams

Pos.	#	Name	Class

Head coach

- Dan Henning

Coordinators/assistant coaches

- Dirk Koetter (offensive coordinator)
- Jack Stanton (defensive coordinator)
- Jerry Azzinaro (defensive line)

Legend

- (C) Team captain
- (S) Suspended
- (I) Ineligible
- Injured
- Redshirt

== Game summaries ==
=== Ohio State ===
#12 Ohio State Buckeyes vs #22 Boston College Eagles

Quarter	1	2	3	4	Total
Ohio State	7	14	10	7	38
Boston College	0	3	3	0	6

at Giants Stadium, East Rutherford, New Jersey

- Date: August 27, 1995
- Game time: 3:30 p.m.
- Game weather: Partly Sunny, 88 °F (31 °C), no wind
- Game attendance: 62,711
- Box Score

Game information

First quarter

- OSU - Eddie George 12-yard run (Josh Jackson kick) 7:34

Second quarter

- BC - McGuire 24-yard field goal 11:35
- OSU - Shawn Springs 97-yard kickoff return (Josh Jackson kick) 11:21
- OSU - Rickey Dudley 12-yard pass from Bobby Hoying (Josh Jackson kick) 0:37

Third quarter

- OSU - Josh Jackson 23-yard field goal 7:25
- BC - McGuire 50-yard field goal 4:51
- OSU - Eddie George 9-yard run (Josh Jackson kick) 2:13

Fourth quarter

- OSU - Dimitrious Stanley 12-yard pass from Bobby Hoying (Josh Jackson kick) 2:47

Top Passers

- OSU - Bobby Hoying - 17/26, 269 yards, 1 TD
- BC - Mark Hartsell - 17/31, 187 yards, 2 INTs

Top Rushers

- BC - Justice Smith - 24 rushes, 123 yards
- OSU - Eddie George - 17 rushes, 99 yards, 2 TDs

Top Receivers

- OSU - Terry Glenn - 3 receptions, 105 yards
- BC - Kenyatta Watson - 6 receptions, 73 yards

Top Tacklers

- BC - Terence Wiggins - 10 (8 solo, 2 assisted)
- OSU - Luke Fickell - 8 (5 solo, 3 assisted)

Interceptions

- OSU - 3 - Shawn Springs (1), Roedell Dupree (1), Che Bryant (1)

=== Virginia Tech ===
Boston College Eagles at #22 Virginia Tech Hokies

Quarter	1	2	3	4	Total
Boston College	7	7	6	0	20
Virginia Tech	0	7	0	7	14

at Lane Stadium, Blacksburg, Virginia

- Date: September 7, 1995
- Game attendance: 44,426
- Box score

Game information
First quarter
- BC - Pollack 11 pass from Hartsell (McGuire kick)

Second quarter

- BC - Harding 4 pass from Hartsell (McGuire kick)
- VT - Still 80 pass from Druckenmiller (Larsen kick)

Third quarter

- BC - Hemmert 3 pass from Hartsell (kick failed)

Fourth quarter

- VT - B. Edmonds 1 run (Larsen kick)

=== Michigan ===
Michigan Wolverines at Boston College Eagles

Quarter	1	2	3	4	Total
Michigan	10	14	7	3	34
Boston College	3	0	7	7	17

at Alumni Stadium, Chestnut Hill, Massachusetts

- Date: October 21, 1995
- Game time: 6:30 p.m. EST
- Game weather: Warm, 64 °F (18 °C), wind 22 mph (35 km/h) SE
- Game attendance: 44,500
- Referee: Buddy Ward
- TV: ESPN
- Box score and Game recap

Game information

First quarter

- No scoring

Second quarter

- BC - Walker 4-yard run (pass failed)
- MICH - Hamilton 25-yard field goal
- MICH - Biakabutuka 18-yard run (Hamilton kick)
- MICH - Hamilton 39-yard field goal

Third quarter

- MICH - Hamilton 29-yard field goal
- MICH - Davis 1-yard run (Hamilton kick)

Fourth quarter

- BC - Pollack 5-yard pass from Hasselback (McGuire kick)

Top Rushers

- MICH - Biakabutuka - 32 rushes, 117 yards, 1 TD
- BC - Smith - 24 rushes, 76 yards

Top Passers

- MICH - Dreisbach - 9/21, 177 yards, 1 INT
- BC - Hartsell - 8/20, 74 yards, 3 INTs

Top Receivers

- MICH - Toomer - 4 receptions, 76 yards
- BC - Grice - 3 receptions, 47 yards

=== Michigan State ===
Boston College Eagles at Michigan State Spartans

Quarter	1	2	3	4	Total
Boston College	0	15	6	0	21
Michigan State	3	6	13	3	25

at Spartan Stadium, East Lansing, Michigan

- Date: September 30, 1995
- Game time: 12:00 p.m. EST
- Game attendance: 72,981
- Box score and Game recap

Game information
First quarter
- MSU - FG C Gardner 27

Second quarter

- BC - Watson 38 run (Mcguire kick)
- MSU - Muhammad 34 pass from Schultz (kick failed)
- BC - Harding 4 pass from Hartsell (Hemmert reception for two-point conversion)

Third quarter

- BC - Hemmert 4 pass from Hartsell (two-point conversion failed)
- MSU - Chapman 3 pass from Schultz (C Gardner kick)
- MSU - S Greene 1 run (two-point conversion failed)

Fourth quarter

- MSU - FG C Gardner 19

=== Pitt ===
Pitt Panthers at Boston College Eagles

Quarter	1	2	3	4	Total
Pitt	0	0	0	0	0
Boston College	7	3	0	7	17

at Alumni Stadium, Chestnut Hill, Massachusetts

- Date: October 7, 1995
- Game attendance: 44,500
- Box score

Game information
First quarter
- BC - O. Walker 8-yard run (D. McGuire kick)

Second quarter

- BC - D. McGuire 41-yard field goal

Third quarter

- No scoring

Fourth quarter

- BC - M. Cloud 11-yard run (D. McGuire kick)

=== West Virginia ===
West Virginia Mountaineers at Boston College Eagles

Quarter	1	2	3	4	Total
West Virginia	10	0	14	7	31
Boston College	0	0	6	13	19

at Alumni Stadium, Chestnut Hill, Massachusetts

- Date: October 14, 1995
- Game attendance: 44,500
- Box score

Game information
First quarter
- WVU - K. Barber 1-yard pass from C. Johnston (B. Baumann kick)
- WVU - B. Baumann 22-yard field goal

Second quarter

- No scoring

Third quarter

- WVU - R. Vanterpool 36-yard pass from C. Johnston (B. Baumann kick)
- WVU - K. Barber 24-yard run (B. Baumann kick)
- BC - K. Watson 84-yard punt return (2-pt. conversion failed)

Fourth quarter

- BC - K. Watson 30-yard pass from T. Pollack (2-pt. conversion failed)
- WVU - R. Walker 1-yard run (B. Baumann kick)
- BC - T. Pollack 1-yard pass from M. Hasselbeck (D. McGuire kick)

=== Army ===
Army Cadets at Boston College Eagles

Quarter	1	2	3	4	Total
Army	14	28	0	7	49
Boston College	0	0	7	0	7

at Alumni Stadium, Chestnut Hill, Massachusetts

- Date: October 21, 1995
- Game attendance: 44,500
- Box score

Game information
First quarter
- ARMY - R. Hodge 3-yard run (J. Parker kick)
- ARMY - J. Conroy 1-yard run (J. Parker kick)

Second quarter

- ARMY - R. McAda 14-yard run (J. Parker kick)
- ARMY - R. McAda 25-yard run (J. Parker kick)
- ARMY - J. Graves 26-yard pass from R. McAda (J. Parker kick)
- ARMY - R. Hodge 1-yard run (J. Parker kick)

Third quarter

- BC - M. Hasselbeck 1-yard run (D. McGuire kick)

Fourth quarter

- ARMY - A. Thompson 4-yard run (J. Parker kick)

=== Notre Dame ===
Boston College Eagles at #12 Notre Dame Fighting Irish

Quarter	1	2	3	4	Total
Boston College	0	7	3	0	10
Notre Dame	7	3	7	3	20

at Notre Dame Stadium, Notre Dame, Indiana

- Date: October 28, 1995
- Game time: 2:30 p.m. EST
- Game attendance: 59,075
- TV: NBC
- Box Score

Game information
First quarter
- ND - Edwards 17 pass from Powlus (Cengia kick)

Second quarter

- BC - O. Walker 2 run (McGuire kick)
- ND - FG Cengia 22

Third quarter

- ND - Edwards 2 run (Cengia kick)
- BC - FG McGuire 41

Fourth quarter

- ND - FG Cengia 26

=== Temple ===
Boston College Eagles at Temple Owls

Quarter	1	2	3	4	Total
Boston College	7	0	3	0	10
Temple	7	0	0	2	9

at Veterans Stadium, Philadelphia, Pennsylvania

- Date: November 4, 1995
- Game attendance: 5,182
- Box score

Game information
First quarter
- BC - O. Walker 5-yard run (D. McGuire kick)
- TEM - H. Burris 10-yard run (Z. Michalski kick)

Second quarter

- No scoring

Third quarter

- BC - D. McGuire 47-yard field goal

Fourth quarter

- TEM - Safety

=== Miami (FL) ===
Miami Hurricanes at Boston College Eagles

Quarter	1	2	3	4	Total
Miami (FL)	7	0	7	3	17
Boston College	0	0	0	14	14

at Alumni Stadium, Chestnut Hill, Massachusetts

- Date: November 11, 1995
- Game attendance: 44,500
- Box score

Game information
First quarter
- UM - G. Daphnis 56-yard pass from R. Clement (D. Prewitt kick)

Second quarter

- No scoring

Third quarter

- UM - D. Ferguson 85-yard run (D. Prewitt kick)

Fourth quarter

- BC - S. Everson 3-yard pass from M. Hartsell (D. McGuire kick)
- BC - O. Walker 1-yard run (D. McGuire kick)
- UM - D. Prewitt 24-yard field goal

=== Syracuse ===
Boston College Eagles at #23 Syracuse Orangemen

Quarter	1	2	3	4	Total
Boston College	0	15	0	14	29
Syracuse	23	14	7	14	58

at Carrier Dome, Syracuse, New York

- Date: November 18, 1995
- Game attendance: 49,384
- Box score

Game information
First quarter
- SYR - Konrad 2 run (O. Mare kick)
- SYR - FG O Mare 35
- SYR - Konrad 20 pass from D. McNabb (O. Mare kick)
- SYR - Konrad 27 run (kick failed)

Second quarter

- BC - King 21 pass from Hartsell (Harding reception for two-point conversion)
- SYR - Harrison 62 punt return (O. Mare kick)
- BC - Anderson 4 run (McGuire kick)
- SYR - S Wilson 9 pass from McNabb (O. Mare kick)

Third quarter

- SYR - R Williams 4 pass from McNabb (O. Mare kick)

Fourth quarter

- SYR - Thomas 21 run (O. Mare kick)
- BC - Cloud 6 run (Hemmert reception for two-point conversion)
- BC - Dragos 1 pass from Hartsell (two-point conversion failed)
- SYR - Thomas 4 run (O. Mare kick)

=== Rutgers ===
Boston College Eagles at Rutgers Scarlet Knights

Quarter	1	2	3	4	Total
Boston College	14	7	7	13	41
Rutgers	7	17	7	7	38

at Rutgers Stadium, Piscataway, New Jersey

- Date: November 24, 1995
- Game attendance: 20,114
- Box score and Game recap

Game information
First quarter
- BC - Watson 63 yard punt return (McGuire kick)
- RUT - Lucas 1 yard run (Mike-Mayer kick)
- BC - Pollack 11 yard pass from Hartsell (McGuire kick)

Second quarter

- RUT - Lucas 7 yard run (Mike-Mayer kick)
- BC - Walker 2 yard run (McGuire kick)
- RUT - Mike-Mayer 20 yard field goal
- RUT - Presly 8 yard run (Mike-Mayer kick)

Third quarter

- BC - Tardio 2 yard pass from Hartsell (McGuire kick)
- RUT - Presley 6 yard run (Kucowski kick)

Fourth quarter

- RUT - Battaglia 34 yard pass from Lucas (Kucowski kick)
- BC - Harding 8 yard pass from Hartsell (pass failed)
- BC - Pollack 7 yard pass from Hartsell (McGuire kick)
