= 1995 Virginia Cavaliers football team =

American college football season

1995 Virginia Cavaliers football

ACC co-champion Peach Bowl champion

Peach Bowl, W 34–27 vs. Georgia
- Conference: Atlantic Coast Conference

Ranking
- Coaches: No. 17
- AP: No. 16
- Record: 9–4 (7–1 ACC)
- Head coach: George Welsh (14th season)
- Offensive coordinator: Tom O'Brien (5th season)
- Defensive coordinator: Rick Lantz (5th season)
- Captains: Jason Augustino; Mike Groh; Skeet Jones
- Home stadium: Scott Stadium

1995 Atlantic Coast Conference football standings
	Conf.			Overall
Team	W		L	W		L
No. 4 Florida State +	7	–	1	10	–	2
No. 16 Virginia +	7	–	1	9	–	4
Clemson	6	–	2	8	–	4
Georgia Tech	5	–	3	6	–	5
North Carolina	4	–	4	7	–	5
Maryland	4	–	4	6	–	5
NC State	2	–	6	3	–	8
Duke	1	–	7	3	–	8
Wake Forest	0	–	8	1	–	10
+ – Conference co-champions; Rankings from AP Poll

The 1995 Virginia Cavaliers football team represented the University of Virginia as a member of the Atlantic Coast Conference (ACC) during the 1995 NCAA Division I-A football season. Led by 14th-year head coach George Welsh, the Cavaliers compiled an overall record of 9–4 with a mark of 7–1 in conference play, sharing the ACC title with Florida State. Virginia was invited to the Peach Bowl, where the Cavaliers defeated Georgia. The team played home games at Scott Stadium in Charlottesville, Virginia.

Virginia's victory over of No. 2 Florida State on November 2 made the Cavaliers the first ACC team to beat the Seminoles in conference play.

== Schedule ==
Date	Time	Opponent	Rank	Site	TV	Result	Attendance	Source
August 26	12:00 pm	at No. 14 Michigan*	No. 17	Michigan Stadium; Ann Arbor, MI (Pigskin Classic)	ABC	L 17–18	101,444	
September 2	7:00 pm	No. 12 (I-AA) William & Mary*	No. 17	Scott Stadium; Charlottesville, VA		W 40–16	38,300	
September 9	4:00 pm	at No. 23 NC State	No. 16	Carter–Finley Stadium; Raleigh, NC		W 29–24	47,718	
September 16	1:30 pm	Georgia Tech	No. 16	Scott Stadium; Charlottesville, VA		W 41–14	36,500	
September 23	12:00 pm	at Clemson	No. 11	Memorial Stadium; Clemson, SC	JPS	W 22–3	70,226	
September 30	12:00 pm	Wake Forest^{†}	No. 11	Scott Stadium; Charlottesville, VA	JPS	W 35–17	37,500	
October 7	12:00 pm	at North Carolina	No. 9	Kenan Memorial Stadium; Chapel Hill, NC (South's Oldest Rivalry)	JPS	L 17–22	50,100	
October 14	1:30 pm	Duke	No. 19	Scott Stadium; Charlottesville, VA		W 44–30	40,200	
October 21	1:00 pm	at No. 16 Texas*	No. 14	Texas Memorial Stadium; Austin, TX	Raycom	L 16–17	70,427	
November 2	8:00 pm	No. 2 Florida State	No. 24	Scott Stadium; Charlottesville, VA (Jefferson–Eppes Trophy)	ESPN	W 33–28	44,300	
November 11	12:00 pm	at Maryland	No. 14	Byrd Stadium; College Park, MD (rivalry)	JPS	W 21–18	45,720	
November 18	12:00 pm	No. 20 Virginia Tech*	No. 13	Scott Stadium; Charlottesville, VA (rivalry)	ABC	L 29–36	43,600	
December 30	8:00 pm	vs. Georgia*	No. 18	Georgia Dome; Atlanta, GA (Peach Bowl)	ESPN	W 34–27	70,825	
*Non-conference game; ^{†}Homecoming; Rankings from AP Poll released prior to the game; All times are in Eastern time

== Roster ==
1995 Virginia Cavaliers football team roster
Players
Coaches
Offense

Pos.	#	Name	Class
WR	2	Demetrius Allen
QB	13	Mike Groh	Sr
WR	17	Germane Crowell	So
RB	21	Tiki Barber	Jr
QB		Wayne Lineburg	Sr

Defense

Pos.	#	Name	Class
DB	19	Ronde Barber	So
DB	27	Percy Ellsworth	Sr
LB	33	Jamie Sharper	Jr
LB	42	James Farrior	Jr
LB		Shannon Taylor	Fr

Special teams

Pos.	#	Name	Class
K	16	Raphael Garcia

Head coach

- George Welsh

Coordinators/assistant coaches

Legend

- (C) Team captain
- (S) Suspended
- (I) Ineligible
- Injured
- Redshirt

Roster
