= 1995 Peach Bowl (December) =

American college football game

- 28th Peach Bowl
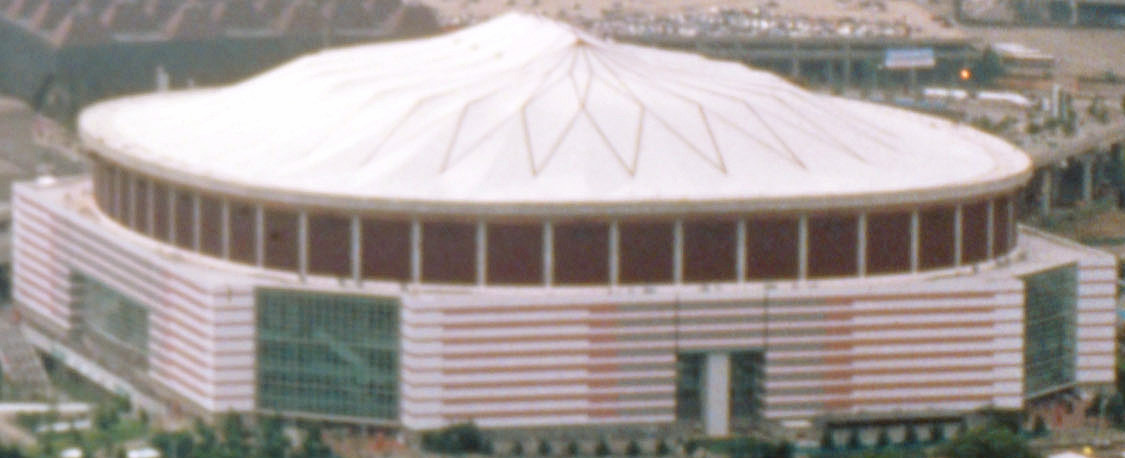
- The Georgia Dome in Atlanta, Georgia, hosted the Peach Bowl.
Georgia Bulldogs	Virginia Cavaliers
(6–5)	(8–4)
SEC	ACC
27	34
Head coach: Ray Goff	Head coach: George Welsh
	AP / Coaches / BA; 18 / 19 / 19
	1	2	3	4	Total
Georgia	3	11	3	10	27
Virginia	14	10	3	7	34
- Date: December 30, 1995
- Season: 1995
- Stadium: Georgia Dome
- Location: Atlanta, Georgia
- MVP: Offensive: Tiki Barber, Virginia; Hines Ward, Georgia; Defensive: Skeet Jones, Virginia; Whit Marshall, Georgia
- Referee: Terry Monk (Big East)
- Attendance: 70,284

United States TV coverage
- Network: ESPN
- Announcers: Joel Meyers (play-by-play); Todd Christensen (analysis)

The 1995 Peach Bowl featured the Georgia Bulldogs and Virginia Cavaliers.

Georgia fell behind to the Cavaliers, 24–6, before rallying to tie the game at 27 late in the fourth quarter. Virginia clinched the victory when Demetrius "Pete" Allen returned a kickoff 83 yards for a touchdown to secure the 34–27 win with under a minute remaining. The Bulldogs lost despite a total offense edge of 525 to 256 yards.

== Scoring summary ==
First Quarter

- Virginia: Tiki Barber 1-yard touchdown run (Rafael Garcia kick), 10:37
- Virginia: Kevin Brooks 5-yard touchdown run (Garcia kick), 4:09
- Georgia: Kanon Parkman 36-yard field goal, 1:00

Second Quarter

- Georgia: Parkman 37-yard field goal, 14:52
- Virginia: Garcia 36-yard field goal, 9:42
- Virginia: Pete Allen 82-yard touchdown pass from Mike Groh (Garcia kick), 2:34
- Georgia: Hines Ward 1-yard touchdown run (Brice Hunter pass from Ward), 0:19

Third Quarter

- Georgia: Brower 20-yard touchdown reception (Brice Hunter pass), 8:01
- Virginia: Garcia 36-yard field goal, 1:58

Fourth Quarter

- Georgia: Parkman 42-yard field goal, 14:43
- Georgia: Jason Ferguson 10-yard fumble return for touchdown (Parkman kick), 1:09
- Virginia: Allen 83-yard kickoff return for touchdown (Garcia kick) 0:57

== Statistics ==
Statistics	Georgia	Virginia
First downs	20	10
Yards rushing	112	100
Yards passing	413	156
Total yards	525	256
Punts-Average	6-35	7-42
Fumbles-Lost	1-1	4-2
Interceptions	2	1
Penalties-Yards	6-40	3-30
