= 1995 Wake Forest Demon Deacons football team =

American college football season

1995 Wake Forest Demon Deacons football
- Conference: Atlantic Coast Conference
- Record: 1–10 (0–8 ACC)
- Head coach: Jim Caldwell (3rd season)
- Offensive coordinator: Jan Quarless (1st season)
- Offensive scheme: Pro-style
- Defensive coordinator: Chris Allen (3rd season)
- Base defense: 4–3
- Captains: Tucker Grace; Elton Ndoma-Ogar
- Home stadium: Groves Stadium

1995 Atlantic Coast Conference football standings
	Conf.			Overall
Team	W		L	W		L
No. 4 Florida State +	7	–	1	10	–	2
No. 16 Virginia +	7	–	1	9	–	4
Clemson	6	–	2	8	–	4
Georgia Tech	5	–	3	6	–	5
North Carolina	4	–	4	7	–	5
Maryland	4	–	4	6	–	5
NC State	2	–	6	3	–	8
Duke	1	–	7	3	–	8
Wake Forest	0	–	8	1	–	10
+ – Conference co-champions; Rankings from AP Poll

The 1995 Wake Forest Demon Deacons football team was an American football team that represented Wake Forest University during the 1995 NCAA Division I-A football season. In their third season under head coach Jim Caldwell, the Demon Deacons compiled a 1–10 record and finished in last place in the Atlantic Coast Conference.

== Schedule ==
Date	Time	Opponent	Site	TV	Result	Attendance	Source
August 31	7:30 pm	No. 6 (I-AA) Appalachian State*	Groves Stadium; Winston-Salem, NC		L 22–24	21,831	
September 9	8:00 pm	at Tulane*	Louisiana Superdome; New Orleans, LA		L 9–35	16,368	
September 16	6:30 pm	Clemson	Groves Stadium; Winston-Salem, NC		L 14–29	18,616	
September 23	7:00 pm	at Navy*	Navy–Marine Corps Memorial Stadium; Annapolis, MD		W 30–7	25,380	
September 30	12:00 pm	at No. 11 Virginia	Scott Stadium; Charlottesville, VA	JPS	L 17–35	37,500	
October 7	6:30 pm	Maryland	Groves Stadium; Winston-Salem, NC		L 6–9	19,107	
October 14	2:00 pm	at No. 1 Florida State	Doak Campbell Stadium; Tallahassee, FL		L 13–72	73,400	
October 21	1:30 pm	at North Carolina	Kenan Memorial Stadium; Chapel Hill, NC (rivalry)		L 7–31	51,000	
October 28	1:30 pm	at Duke	Wallace Wade Stadium; Durham, NC (rivalry)		L 26–42	31,752	
November 4	1:00 pm	Georgia Tech	Groves Stadium; Winston-Salem, NC		L 23–24	23,114	
November 18	1:00 pm	NC State	Groves Stadium; Winston-Salem, NC (rivalry)		L 23–52	18,218	
*Non-conference game; Rankings from AP Poll released prior to the game; All times are in Eastern time

== Game summaries ==
=== No. 6 (I-AA) Appalachian State ===
	1	2	3	4	Total
No. 6 (I-AA) Mountaineers	7	17	0	0	24
Demon Deacons	0	0	15	7	22

=== At Tulane ===
	1	2	3	4	Total
Demon Deacons	0	3	0	6	9
Green Wave	21	0	7	7	35

=== Clemson ===
	1	2	3	4	Total
Tigers	0	8	14	7	29
Demon Deacons	8	0	0	6	14

=== At Navy ===
	1	2	3	4	Total
Demon Deacons	6	8	0	16	30
Midshipmen	0	7	0	0	7

Statistics	WAKE	NAVY
First downs	15	15
Total yards	340	256
Rushing yards	98	132
Passing yards	242	124
Passing: Comp–Att–Int	12–29–1	13–24–4
Turnovers	1	6
Time of possession	31:25	28:35

Team	Category	Player	Statistics
Wake Forest	Passing	Rusty LaRue	12/28, 242 yards, TD, INT
Wake Forest	Rushing	John Lewis	23 rushes, 41 yards, 3 TD
Wake Forest	Receiving	Marlon Estes	6 receptions, 124 yards, TD
Navy	Passing	Chris McCoy	9/19, 65 yards, TD, 3 INT
Navy	Rushing	Chris McCoy	24 rushes, 57 yards
Navy	Receiving	Cory Schemm	5 receptions, 77 yards

== Team leaders ==
Category	Team Leader	Att/Cth	Yds
Passing	Rusty LaRue	264/421	2,775
Rushing	John Lewis	110	304
Receiving	Marlon Estes	68	833
