= 1996 Gator Bowl =

1996 Toyota Gator Bowl
- 51st Gator Bowl
Syracuse Orangemen	Clemson Tigers
(8–3)	(8–3)
Big East	ACC
41	0
Head coach: Paul Pasqualoni	Head coach: Tommy West
AP / Coaches / BA; 26 / 22 / 24	AP / Coaches / BA; 23 / 21 / 23
	1	2	3	4	Total
Syracuse	20	0	14	7	41
Clemson	0	0	0	0	0
- Date: January 1, 1996
- Season: 1995
- Stadium: Jacksonville Municipal Stadium
- Location: Jacksonville, Florida
- MVP: Donovan McNabb (Syracuse), QB; Peter Ford (Clemson), CB
- Referee: Jim Kemerling (Big Ten)
- Attendance: 45,202

United States TV coverage
- Network: NBC
- Announcers: Tom Hammond & Bob Trumpy

The 1996 Gator Bowl was a college football postseason bowl game between the Syracuse Orangemen and the Clemson Tigers.

== Background ==
This was the first Gator Bowl to feature the second-place teams from the Big East Conference and the Atlantic Coast Conference. This was Syracuse's first Gator Bowl since 1966, and Clemson's first since 1989. This was the first Gator Bowl game to be played at Jacksonville Municipal Stadium, which was built on the site of the former Gator Bowl Stadium.

== Game summary ==
Donovan McNabb went 13-of-23 for 309 yards and 3 touchdowns as the Orangemen routed the Tigers in a rain soaked contest. Malcolm Thomas started the scoring for the Orangemen on a 1-yard touchdown run after a drive of 64 yards. McNabb went on a 5-yard run for a touchdown to make it 13–0. Marvin Harrison caught a touchdown pass from McNabb to make it 20–0 as the first quarter ended. After a scoreless second quarter, Thomas ran for his second touchdown to make it 27–0. Harrison caught his second touchdown from McNabb from 56 yards out to make it 34–0 after three quarters. Kaseem Sinceno caught a touchdown pass from McNabb in the fourth to close out the scoring. Clemson was held to less than 200 yards and committed 3 turnovers. Marvin Harrison caught seven receptions for 173 yards and two touchdowns in his final college game. This was Syracuse's sixth straight bowl win.

== Aftermath ==
Both teams ended up playing another bowl game in the calendar year of 1996. The Tigers made three more bowl games before the turn of the century, and the Orange made four before the 1990s ended. The Tigers would return to the Gator Bowl in 2001, 2009 and 2023.

== Statistics ==
Statistics	Syracuse	Clemson
First downs	21	12
Yards rushing	158	90
Yards passing	309	69
Total yards	467	159
Punts-average	4–43.5	6–49.3
Fumbles-lost	1–0	1–0
Interceptions	1	3
Penalties-yards	7–65	1–16
