= 1995 Maryland Terrapins football team =

American college football season

1995 Maryland Terrapins football
- Conference: Atlantic Coast Conference
- Record: 6–5 (4–4 ACC)
- Head coach: Mark Duffner (4th season)
- Offensive coordinator: Dan Dorazio (4th season)
- Offensive scheme: Run and shoot
- Defensive coordinator: Kevin Coyle (2nd season)
- Base defense: 4–3
- Home stadium: Byrd Stadium

1995 Atlantic Coast Conference football standings
	Conf.			Overall
Team	W		L	W		L
No. 4 Florida State +	7	–	1	10	–	2
No. 16 Virginia +	7	–	1	9	–	4
Clemson	6	–	2	8	–	4
Georgia Tech	5	–	3	6	–	5
North Carolina	4	–	4	7	–	5
Maryland	4	–	4	6	–	5
NC State	2	–	6	3	–	8
Duke	1	–	7	3	–	8
Wake Forest	0	–	8	1	–	10
+ – Conference co-champions; Rankings from AP Poll

The 1995 Maryland Terrapins football team represented the University of Maryland in the 1995 NCAA Division I-A football season. In their fourth season under head coach Mark Duffner, the Terrapins compiled a 6–5 record, finished in a tie for fifth place in the Atlantic Coast Conference, and were outscored by their opponents 251 to 210. The team's statistical leaders included Brian Cummings with 1,193 passing yards, Buddy Rodgers with 718 rushing yards, and Jermaine Lewis with 937 receiving yards.

== Schedule ==
Date	Time	Opponent	Rank	Site	TV	Result	Attendance	Source
September 2		at Tulane*		Louisiana Superdome; New Orleans, LA		W 29–10	18,159	
September 9	12:00 p.m.	North Carolina		Byrd Stadium; College Park, MD	JPS	W 32–18	32,215	
September 16	7:00 p.m.	West Virginia*		Byrd Stadium; College Park, MD (rivalry)		W 31–17	48,055	
September 23		Duke	No. 24	Byrd Stadium; College Park, MD		W 41–28	41,013	
September 28	8:00 p.m.	at Georgia Tech	No. 17	Bobby Dodd Stadium; Atlanta, GA	ESPN	L 3–31	44,137	
October 7	6:30 p.m.	at Wake Forest		Groves Stadium; Winston-Salem, NC		W 9–6	19,107	
October 21	12:00 p.m.	Clemson		Byrd Stadium; College Park, MD	JPS	L 0–17	43,603	
October 28		at Louisville*		Cardinal Stadium; Louisville, KY		L 0–31	36,386	
November 4	1:00 p.m.	at NC State		Carter–Finley Stadium; Raleigh, NC		W 30–13	45,652	
November 11	12:00 p.m.	No. 14 Virginia		Byrd Stadium; College Park, MD (rivalry)	JPS	L 18–21	45,720	
November 18	12:00 p.m.	at No. 6 Florida State		Doak Campbell Stadium; Tallahassee, FL	JPS	L 17–59	68,400	
*Non-conference game; Rankings from AP Poll released prior to the game; All times are in Eastern time

== Roster ==
1995 Maryland Terrapins football team roster
Players
Coaches
Offense

Pos.	#	Name	Class
QB	9	Brian Cummings	So
WR	4	Jermaine Lewis	Sr
QB	13	Scott Milanovich	Sr
TE	97	Craig Fitzgerald	Jr

Defense

Pos.	#	Name	Class
DB	25	Clifton Crosby	Fr
DE	42	Eric Ogbogu	So
LB	32	Kendall Ogle	So
DB	12	Chad Scott	Jr

Special teams

Pos.	#	Name	Class

Head coach

- Mark Duffner

Coordinators/assistant coaches

Legend

- (C) Team captain
- (S) Suspended
- (I) Ineligible
- Injured
- Redshirt

== Game summaries ==
=== Tulane ===
Maryland Terrapins at Tulane Green Wave

Quarter	1	2	3	4	Total
Maryland	7	8	0	14	29
Tulane	0	3	0	7	10

at Louisiana Superdome, New Orleans, Louisiana

- Date: September 2, 1995
- Game weather: None (indoors)
- Game attendance: 18,159
- Recap, pg. 120

Game information
First quarter
- UMD - Buddy Rodgers 6-yard run (Joe O'Donnell kick)

Second quarter

- UMD - Orlando Strozier 5-yard run (Joe O'Donnell kick)
- TUL - Brad Palazzo 32-yard field goal

Third quarter

- No scoring

Fourth quarter

- TUL - John Hubert 15-yard pass from Aley Demarest (Brad Palazzo kick)
- UMD - Buddy Rodgers 19-yard run (Joe O'Donnell kick)
- UMD - Brian Underwood 3-yard run (Joe O'Donnell kick)

=== North Carolina ===
North Carolina Tar Heels at Maryland Terrapins

Quarter	1	2	3	4	Total
North Carolina	7	3	8	0	18
Maryland	0	7	18	7	32

at Byrd Stadium, College Park, Maryland

- Date: September 9, 1995
- Game time: 12:00 p.m. EST
- Game weather: 81 °F (27 °C), humid, wind E 8 mph (13 km/h)
- Game attendance: 33,215
- Recap, pg. 121

Game information
First quarter
- UNC - J. Linton 13-yard run (S. Caparelli kick)

Second quarter

- UNC - S. Caparelli 21-yard field goal
- UMD - Buddy Rodgers 2-yard run (Joe O'Donnell kick)

Third quarter

- UMD - Joe O'Donnell 45-yard field goal
- UMD - Mancel Johnson 50-yard pass from Brian Cummings (Buddy Rodgers run)
- UNC - J. Linton 22-yard run (O. Barnes catch)
- UMD - Orlando Strozier 1-yard run (Joe O'Donnell kick)

Fourth quarter

- UMD - Mancel Johnson 32-yard reception from Buddy Rodgers (Joe O'Donnell kick)

=== West Virginia ===
West Virginia Mountaineers at Maryland Terrapins

Quarter	1	2	3	4	Total
West Virginia	3	7	7	0	17
Maryland	14	0	17	0	31

at Byrd Stadium, College Park, Maryland

- Date: September 16, 1995
- Game time: 7:00 p.m. EST
- Game weather: 68 °F (20 °C), steady rain, wind NE 12 mph (19 km/h)
- Game attendance: 48,055
- Recap, pg. 122

Game information
First quarter
- WVU - B. Baumann 35-yard field goal
- UMD - Buddy Rodgers 54-yard run (Joe O'Donnell kick)

Second quarter

- WVU - A. Beasley 49-yard interception return (B. Baumann kick)

Third quarter

- UMD - Mancel Johnson 24-yard pass from Brian Cummings (Joe O'Donnell kick)
- UMD - Joe O'Donnell 47-yard field goal
- WVU - L. Purnell 17-yard pass from C. Johnston (B. Baumann kick)
- UMD - Jermaine Lewis 11-yard pass from Brian Cummings (Joe O'Donnell kick)

Fourth quarter

- No scoring

=== Duke ===
Duke Blue Devils at Maryland Terrapins

Quarter	1	2	3	4	Total
Duke	3	15	0	10	28
Maryland	0	21	11	9	41

at Byrd Stadium, College Park, Maryland

- Date: September 23, 1995
- Game weather: 55 °F (13 °C), 37% humidity, chance of scattered showers
- Game attendance: 41,013
- Recap, pg. 123

Game information
First quarter
- DUKE - T. Cochran 24-yard field goal

Second quarter

- UMD - Jermaine Lewis 45-yard pass from Brian Cummings (Joe O'Donnell kick)
- UMD - Buddy Rodgers 4-yard run (Joe O'Donnell kick)
- UMD - Bruce James 48-yard pass from Brian Cummings (Joe O'Donnell kick)
- DUKE - L. Marshall 1-yard run (T. Cochran kick)
- DUKE - L. Marshall 2-yard run (M. Wilson pass from S. Fischer)

Third quarter

- UMD - Joe O'Donnell 19-yard field goal
- UMD - Orlando Strozier 1-yard run (Geroy Simon pass from Brian Cummings)

Fourth quarter

- DUKE - S. Fisher 1-yard run (T. Cochran kick)
- UMD - Joe O'Donnell 25-yard field goal
- DUKE - T. Cochran 33-yard field goal
- UMD - Buddy Rodgers 21-yard run (kick failed)

=== Georgia Tech ===
Maryland Terrapins at Georgia Tech Yellow Jackets

Quarter	1	2	3	4	Total
Maryland	0	3	0	0	3
Georgia Tech	3	13	0	15	31

at Grant Field at Bobby Dodd Stadium, Atlanta, Georgia

- Date: September 28, 1995
- Game time: 8:00 p.m. EST
- Game weather: 71 °F (22 °C), clear, wind E 10 mph (16 km/h)
- Game attendance: 44,137
- Recap, pg. 124

Game information
First quarter
- GT - D. Frakes 37-yard field goal

Second quarter

- GT - C.J. Williams 37-yard run (B. Chambers kick)
- UMD - Joe O'Donnell 22-yard field goal
- GT - C. Zachery 25-yard pass from D. Davis (kick failed)

Third quarter

- No scoring

Fourth quarter

- GT - C.J. Williams 14-yard run (G. Baynham pass from D. Davis)
- GT - C. Wiley 19-yard run (B. Chambers kick)

=== Wake Forest ===
Maryland Terrapins at Wake Forest Demon Deacons

Quarter	1	2	3	4	Total
Maryland	0	3	6	0	9
Wake Forest	0	3	0	3	6

at Groves Stadium, Winston-Salem, North Carolina

- Date: October 7, 1995
- Game time: 6:30 p.m. EST
- Game weather: 76 °F (24 °C), clear, wind W 6–10 mph (9.7–16.1 km/h)
- Game attendance: 19,107
- Recap, pg. 125

Game information
First quarter
- No scoring

Second quarter

- WF - B. Hollows 33-yard field goal
- UMD - Joe O'Donnell 19-yard field goal

Third quarter

- UMD - Buddy Rodgers 1-yard run (kick failed)

Fourth quarter

- WF - B. Hollows 37-yard field goal

=== Clemson ===
Clemson Tigers at Maryland Terrapins

Quarter	1	2	3	4	Total
Clemson	7	7	3	0	17
Maryland	0	0	0	0	0

at Byrd Stadium, College Park, Maryland

- Date: October 21, 1995
- Game time: 12:00 p.m. EST
- Game weather: 50 °F (10 °C), 96% humidity, wind WNW 9 mph (14 km/h)
- Game attendance: 43,603
- Recap, pg. 126

Game information
First quarter
- CLEM - R. Priester 4-yard run (J. Sauve kick)

Second quarter

- CLEM - A. Wyatt 32-yard pass from L. Solomon (J. Sauve kick)

Third quarter

- CLEM - J. Sauve 36-yard field goal

Fourth quarter

- No scoring

=== Louisville ===
Maryland Terrapins at Louisville Cardinals

Quarter	1	2	3	4	Total
Maryland	0	0	0	0	0
Louisville	0	3	7	21	31

at Cardinal Stadium, Louisville, Kentucky

- Date: October 28, 1995
- Game weather: 50 °F (10 °C), cloudy, wind W 15 mph (24 km/h)
- Game attendance: 36,386
- Recap, pg. 127

Game information
First quarter
- No scoring

Second quarter

- UL - D. Akers 18-yard field goal

Third quarter

- UL - C. Arrington 5-yard run (D. Akers kick)

Fourth quarter

- UL - C. Sims 14-yard run (D. Akers kick)
- UL - C. Sims 26-yard pass from M. Lowe (D. Akers kick)
- UL - J. Payne 12-yard run (D. Akers kick)

=== NC State ===
Maryland Terrapins at NC State Wolfpack

Quarter	1	2	3	4	Total
Maryland	3	0	14	13	30
NC State	0	10	3	0	13

at Carter-Finley Stadium, Raleigh, North Carolina

- Date: November 4, 1995
- Game time: 1:00 p.m. EST
- Game weather: 50 °F (10 °C), sunny, wind N 10–20 mph (16–32 km/h)
- Game attendance: 45,652
- Recap, pg. 128

Game information
First quarter
- UMD - Brad Rhodes 27-yard field goal

Second quarter

- NCST - M. Primanti 34-yard field goal
- NCST - J. Laureano 1-yard run (M. Primanti kick)

Third quarter

- UMD - Jermaine Lewis 66-yard punt return (Brad Rhodes kick)
- NCST - M. Primanti 22-yard field goal

Fourth quarter

- UMD - Jermaine Lewis 14-yard run (Brad Rhodes kick)
- UMD - Jermaine Lewis 13-yard run (kick failed)

=== Virginia ===
Virginia Cavaliers at Maryland Terrapins

Quarter	1	2	3	4	Total
Virginia	0	11	7	3	21
Maryland	11	0	0	7	18

at Byrd Stadium, College Park, Maryland

- Date: November 11, 1995
- Game time: 12:00 p.m. EST
- Game weather: 65 °F (18 °C), cloudy and windy, chance of showers, wind S 16 mph (26 km/h)
- Game attendance: 45,720
- Recap, pg. 129

Game information
First quarter
- UMD - Joe O'Donnell 37-yard field goal
- UMD - Scot Milanovich 1-yard run (Brian Underwood run)

Second quarter

- UVA - R. Garcia 22-yard field goal
- UVA - Tiki Barber 2-yard run (D. Allen pass from M. Groh)

Third quarter

- UVA - K. Brooks 5-yard run (R. Garcia kick)

Fourth quarter

- UVA - R. Garcia 41-yard field goal
- UMD - Buddy Rodgers 5-yard run (Joe O'Donnell kick)

=== Florida State ===
Maryland Terrapins at Florida State Seminoles

Quarter	1	2	3	4	Total
Maryland	0	10	7	0	17
Florida State	14	17	14	14	59

at Doak Campbell Stadium, Tallahassee, Florida

- Date: November 18, 1995
- Game time: 12:00 p.m. EST
- Game weather: 62 °F (17 °C), partly cloudy, 74% humidity, wind E 10 mph (16 km/h)
- Game attendance: 68,400
- Recap, pg. 130

Game information
First quarter
- FSU - P.B. Williams 1-yard run (S. Bentley kick)
- FSU - E.G. Green 17-yard pass from D. Kanell (S. Bentley kick)

Second quarter

- UMD - Walt Williams 17-yard pass from Scott Milanovich (Joe O'Donnell kick)
- FSU - P.B. Williams 1-yard run (S. Bentley kick)
- FSU - S. Bentley 26-yard field goal
- UMD - Joe O'Donnell 26-yard field goal
- FSU - W. Dunn 24-yard run (S. Bentley kick)

Third quarter

- FSU - A. Cooper 53-yard pass from D. Kanell (S. Bentley kick)
- UMD - Jermaine Lewis recovered fumble in endzone (Joe O'Donnell kick)
- FSU - W. Dunn 9-yard run (S. Bentley kick)

Fourth quarter

- FSU - A. Cooper 4-yard pass from T. Busby (S. Bentley kick)
- FSU - D. Feaster 2-yard run (S. Bentley kick)
