= 1995 North Carolina Tar Heels football team =

American college football season

1995 North Carolina Tar Heels football

Carquest Bowl champion

Carquest Bowl, W 20–10 vs. Arkansas
- Conference: Atlantic Coast Conference
- Record: 7–5 (4–4 ACC)
- Head coach: Mack Brown (8th season)
- Offensive scheme: Multiple
- Defensive coordinator: Carl Torbush (8th season)
- Base defense: 4–3
- Captains: Eric Thomas; Marcus Wall
- Home stadium: Kenan Memorial Stadium

1995 Atlantic Coast Conference football standings
	Conf.			Overall
Team	W		L	W		L
No. 4 Florida State +	7	–	1	10	–	2
No. 16 Virginia +	7	–	1	9	–	4
Clemson	6	–	2	8	–	4
Georgia Tech	5	–	3	6	–	5
North Carolina	4	–	4	7	–	5
Maryland	4	–	4	6	–	5
NC State	2	–	6	3	–	8
Duke	1	–	7	3	–	8
Wake Forest	0	–	8	1	–	10
+ – Conference co-champions; Rankings from AP Poll

The 1995 North Carolina Tar Heels football team represented the University of North Carolina at Chapel Hill during the 1995 NCAA Division I-A football season. The Tar Heels played their home games at Kenan Memorial Stadium in Chapel Hill, North Carolina and competed in the Atlantic Coast Conference. The team was led by head coach Mack Brown.

== Schedule ==
Date	Time	Opponent	Rank	Site	TV	Result	Attendance	Source
September 2	7:30 p.m.	Syracuse*	No. 20	Kenan Memorial Stadium; Chapel Hill, NC	ESPN	L 9–20	52,400	
September 9	12:00 p.m.	at Maryland		Byrd Stadium; College Park, MD	JPS	L 18–32	32,215	
September 21	8:00 p.m.	at Louisville*		Cardinal Stadium; Louisville, KY	ESPN	W 17–10	37,704	
September 30	1:30 p.m.	Ohio*		Kenan Memorial Stadium; Chapel Hill, NC		W 62–0	43,200	
October 7	12:00 p.m.	No. 9 Virginia		Kenan Memorial Stadium; Chapel Hill, NC (South's Oldest Rivalry)	JPS	W 22–17	50,100	
October 14	12:00 p.m.	at Georgia Tech		Bobby Dodd Stadium; Atlanta, GA	JPS	L 25–27	40,201	
October 21	1:30 p.m.	Wake Forest		Kenan Memorial Stadium; Chapel Hill, NC (rivalry)		W 31–7	51,000	
November 4	12:00 p.m.	at Clemson		Memorial Stadium; Clemson, SC	JPS	L 10–17	72,103	
November 11	12:00 p.m.	No. 6 Florida State		Kenan Memorial Stadium; Chapel Hill, NC	JPS	L 12–28	36,000	
November 18	12:00 p.m.	Duke		Kenan Memorial Stadium; Chapel Hill, NC (Victory Bell)	JPS	W 28–24	47,000	
November 24	11:00 a.m.	at NC State		Carter–Finley Stadium; Raleigh, NC (rivalry)	ABC	W 30–28	48,100	
December 30	7:30 p.m.	vs. No. 24 Arkansas*		Joe Robbie Stadium; Miami Gardens, FL (Carquest Bowl)	TBS	W 20–10	34,428	
*Non-conference game; Rankings from AP Poll released prior to the game; All times are in Eastern time

== Roster ==
1995 North Carolina Tar Heels football team roster
Players
Coaches
Offense

Pos.	#	Name	Class
WR	3	Greg Williams	So
TB	12	Leon Johnson	Jr
RB	27	Jonathan Linton	So
OT	51	Mike Baxter	So
G	63	Mike Hobgood	So
C	64	Jeff Saturday	So
G	74	Jerness Gethers	Jr
OT	75	Byron Thomas	Jr
TE	92	Freddie Jones	Jr

Defense

Pos.	#	Name	Class
S	2	Omar Brown	So
LB	9	Keith Newman	Fr
CB	29	Robert Williams	Fr
LB	41	Brian Simmons	So
LB	53	Kivuusama Mays	So
LB	54	James Hamilton	Jr
DT	70	Andre Purvis	Jr
DT	94	Rick Terry	Jr

Special teams

Pos.	#	Name	Class
DS	69	Stu Holt	Sr

Head coach

- Mack Brown

Coordinators/assistant coaches

Legend

- (C) Team captain
- (S) Suspended
- (I) Ineligible
- Injured
- Redshirt

Roster
