= Andy Rondeau =

American football coach (born 1969)

Biographical details
- Born: February 14, 1969 (age 57); Holliston, Massachusetts, U.S.
- Education: Syracuse University (1991); University of Pittsburgh (1996)

Coaching career (HC unless noted)
- 1990: Syracuse (SA)
- 1991–1993: Northeastern (DB)
- 1994–1996: Pittsburgh (GA)
- 1997–2002: North Dakota State (DB)
- 2003: Tennessee–Martin (DC/LB)
- 2004–2005: Buffalo (assistant DC/S)
- 2006: Maine (ST/DB)
- 2007–2011: Old Dominion (DC/LB)
- 2012–2013: Holy Cross (DC/DB)
- 2014–2024: Pace

Head coaching record
- Overall: 31–72

Andrew Rondeau (born February 14, 1969) is an American college football coach. He was the head football coach for Pace University from 2014 to 2024. He also coached for Syracuse, Northeastern, Pittsburgh, North Dakota State, Tennessee–Martin, Buffalo, Maine, Old Dominion, and Holy Cross.

In 2014, Rondeau was accused of verbally and physically abusing his players. In 2015, he was cleared of all allegations of abuse and recruiting players through false academic promises.

== Head coaching record ==
Year	Team	Overall	Conference	Standing	Bowl/playoffs
Pace Setters (Northeast-10 Conference) (2014–2024)
2014	Pace	1–10	0–9	10th	
2015	Pace	1–10	0–9	10th	
2016	Pace	0–11	0–9	10th	
2017	Pace	3–7	2–7	T–8th	
2018	Pace	7–3	6–3	T–3rd	
2019	Pace	6–4	5–3	T–3rd	
2020–21	No team—COVID-19				
2021	Pace	2–8	2–6	T–7th	
2022	Pace	6–4	4–3	4th	
2023	Pace	3–7	2–5	7th	
2024	Pace	2–8	2-6	8th	
Pace:		31–72	23–60		
Total:		31–72			
