= 1995 Florida State Seminoles football team =

American college football season

1995 Florida State Seminoles football

ACC co-champion Orange Bowl champion

Orange Bowl, W 31–26 vs. Notre Dame
- Conference: Atlantic Coast Conference

Ranking
- Coaches: No. 5
- AP: No. 4
- Record: 10–2 (7–1 ACC)
- Head coach: Bobby Bowden (20th season)
- Offensive coordinator: Mark Richt (2nd season)
- Offensive scheme: Pro-style
- Defensive coordinator: Mickey Andrews (12th season)
- Base defense: 4–3
- Captains: Clay Shiver; Todd Rebol; Tyrant Marion
- Home stadium: Doak Campbell Stadium

1995 Atlantic Coast Conference football standings
	Conf.			Overall
Team	W		L	W		L
No. 4 Florida State +	7	–	1	10	–	2
No. 16 Virginia +	7	–	1	9	–	4
Clemson	6	–	2	8	–	4
Georgia Tech	5	–	3	6	–	5
North Carolina	4	–	4	7	–	5
Maryland	4	–	4	6	–	5
NC State	2	–	6	3	–	8
Duke	1	–	7	3	–	8
Wake Forest	0	–	8	1	–	10
+ – Conference co-champions; Rankings from AP Poll

The 1995 Florida State Seminoles football team represented Florida State University as a member of the Atlantic Coast Conference (ACC) during the 1995 NCAA Division I-A football season. Led by 20th-year head coach Bobby Bowden, the Seminoles compiled an overall record of 10–2 with a mark of 7–1 in conference play, sharing the ACC title with Virginia, whose November 2 victory over the Seminoles marked Florida State's first conference loss since joining the ACC in 1992. Florida State was invited to the Orange Bowl, where the Seminoles defeated Notre Dame. The team played home games at Doak Campbell Stadium in Tallahassee, Florida.

Running back Warrick Dunn finished ninth place in the Heisman Trophy voting. Florida State scored 563 points, setting a single-season program record.

== Schedule ==
Date	Time	Opponent	Rank	Site	TV	Result	Attendance	Source
September 2	3:30 p.m.	vs. Duke	No. 1	Florida Citrus Bowl; Orlando, FL	ABC	W 70–26	51,200	
September 9	12:00 p.m.	at Clemson	No. 1	Memorial Stadium; Clemson, SC (rivalry)	ABC	W 45–26	78,133	
September 16	12:00 p.m.	NC State	No. 1	Doak Campbell Stadium; Tallahassee, FL	JPS	W 77–17	72,800	
September 23	7:00 p.m.	UCF*	No. 1	Doak Campbell Stadium; Tallahassee, FL	PPV	W 46–14	76,600	
October 7	7:30 p.m.	Miami (FL)*	No. 1	Doak Campbell Stadium; Tallahassee, FL (rivalry, College GameDay)	ESPN	W 41–17	80,350	
October 14	2:00 p.m.	Wake Forest	No. 1	Doak Campbell Stadium; Tallahassee, FL	PPV	W 72–13	73,400	
October 21	3:30 p.m.	Georgia Tech	No. 1	Doak Campbell Stadium; Tallahassee, FL	ABC	W 42–10	76,400	
November 2	8:00 p.m.	at No. 24 Virginia	No. 2	Scott Stadium; Charlottesville, VA (Jefferson–Eppes Trophy)	ESPN	L 28–33	44,300	
November 11	12:00 p.m.	at North Carolina	No. 6	Kenan Memorial Stadium; Chapel Hill, NC	JPS	W 28–12	36,000	
November 18	12:00 p.m.	Maryland	No. 6	Doak Campbell Stadium; Tallahassee, FL	JPS	W 59–17	68,400	
November 25	12:00 p.m.	at No. 3 Florida*	No. 6	Ben Hill Griffin Stadium; Gainesville, FL (rivalry, College GameDay)	ABC	L 24–35	85,711	
January 1	8:00 p.m.	vs. No. 6 Notre Dame*	No. 8	Miami Orange Bowl; Miami, FL (Orange Bowl, rivalry)	CBS	W 31–26	72,198	
*Non-conference game; Rankings from AP Poll released prior to the game; All times are in Eastern time

== Rankings ==
Ranking movements Legend: ██ Increase in ranking ██ Decrease in ranking ( ) = First-place votes
	Week																
Poll	Pre	1	2	3	4	5	6	7	8	9	10	11	12	13	14	15	Final
AP	1 (31)	1 (31)	1 (38)	1 (33)	1 (36)	1 (42)	1 (37)	1 (40)	1 (38)	1 (34)	2 (31)	6	6	6	8	8	4
Coaches Poll	1 (28)		1 (36)	1 (31)	1 (33)	1 (35)	1 (34)	1 (33)	1 (34)	1 (34)	2 (24)	6	6	6	8	8	5

== Game summaries ==
=== At Virginia ===
Florida State at Virginia

Team	1	2	3	4	Total
No. 2 Seminoles	14	7	0	7	28
• No. 24 Cavaliers	7	20	3	3	33

- Date: November 2
- Location: Scott Stadium, Charlottesville, Virginia
- Game attendance: 44,300
- TV announcers (ESPN): Ron Franklin and Mike Gottfried

Scoring summary
1	8:05	FSU	Phillip Riley 35-yard touchdown pass from Danny Kanell (Scott Bentley kick)	FSU 7-0
1	6:09	UVA	Tiki Barber 64-yard run (Raphael Garcia kick)	Tied 7-7
1	1:14	FSU	Warrick Dunn 14-yard pass from Danny Kanell (Scott Bentley kick)	FSU 14-7
2	13:26	UVA	Tiki Barber 1-yard pass from Mike Groh (Raphael Garcia kick)	Tied 14-14
2	11:16	UVA	Raphael Garcia 35-yard field goal	UVA 17-14
2	3:05	UVA	Demetrius Allen 72-yard pass from Mike Groh (Raphael Garcia kick)	UVA 24-14
2	2:13	FSU	E. G. Green 38-yard pass from Danny Kanell (Scott Bentley kick)	UVA 24-21
2	1:14	UVA	Raphael Garcia 48-yard field goal	UVA 27-21
3	10:38	UVA	Raphael Garcia 41-yard field goal	UVA 30-21
4	6:57	UVA	Raphael Garcia 35-yard field goal	UVA 33-21
4	6:13	FSU	Warrick Dunn 7-yard run (Scott Bentley kick)	UVA 33-28

=== At Florida ===
Florida State at Florida

Team	1	2	3	4	Total
No. 6 Seminoles	6	0	18	0	24
• No. 3 Gators	7	21	7	0	35

- Date: November 25
- Location: Ben Hill Griffin Stadium, Gainesville, Florida
- Game attendance: 85,711
- Game weather: Cloudy
- TV announcers (ABC): Keith Jackson

Scoring summary
1	12:51	FSU	Scott Bentley 40 yard field goal	FSU 3-0
1	5:04	FLA	Jacquez Green 22 yard pass from Danny Wuerffel (Bart Edmiston kick)	FLA 7-3
1	0:27	FSU	Scott Bentley 38 yard field goal	FLA 7-6
2	11:52	FLA	Terry Jackson 1 yard run (Bart Edmiston kick)	FLA 14-6
2	3:54	FLA	Ike Hilliard 42 yard pass from Danny Wuerffel (Bart Edmiston kick)	FLA 21-6
2	0:47	FLA	Chris Doering 20 yard pass from Danny Wuerffel (Bart Edmiston kick)	FLA 28-6
3	4:30	FSU	Warrick Dunn 3 yard run (Danny Kanell to E.G. Green pass)	FLA 28-14
3	4:10	FLA	Ike Hilliard 74 yard pass from Danny Wuerffel (Bart Edmiston kick)	FLA 35-14
3	2:20	FSU	Scott Bentley 27 yard field goal	FLA 35-17
3	0:53	FSU	Andre Cooper 8 yard pass from Danny Kanell (Scott Bentley kick)	FLA 35-24

=== Vs. Notre Dame—Orange Bowl ===
Florida State vs. Notre Dame

Team	1	2	3	4	Total
• No. 8 Seminoles	7	7	0	17	31
No. 6 Fighting Irish	10	0	7	9	26

- Date: January 1, 1996
- Location: Miami Orange Bowl, Miami
- Game attendance: 72,198
- Referee: Jimmy Harper (SEC)
- TV announcers (CBS): Sean McDonough and Pat Haden

== Roster ==
1995 Florida State Seminoles football team roster
Players
Coaches
Offense

Pos.	#	Name	Class
QB	12	Thad Busby	So
WR	1	Andre Cooper	Jr
RB	28	Warrick Dunn	Jr
WR	19	E. G. Green	So
QB	13	Danny Kanell	Sr
WR	88	Randy Moss	Fr
WR	15	Phillip Riley	Sr
WR	9	Peter Warrick	Fr

Defense

Pos.	#	Name	Class
DE	58	Peter Boulware	So
CB	20	James Colzie	Jr
LB	56	Sam Cowart	Jr
LB	45	Henri Crockett	Jr
LB	40	Lamont Green	Fr
CB	11	Dexter Jackson	Fr
CB	2	Samari Rolle	So
DL	98	Orpheus Roye	Sr
DL	85	Andre Wadsworth	So
DE	55	Reinard Wilson	Jr

Special teams

Pos.	#	Name	Class
K	3	Scott Bentley	Jr
P		Sean Liss

Head coach

- Bobby Bowden

Coordinators/assistant coaches

- Chuck Amato
- Mickey Andrews
- Mark Richt

Legend

- (C) Team captain
- (S) Suspended
- (I) Ineligible
- Injured
- Redshirt
