= 1995 Carquest Bowl (December) =

American college football game

North Carolina Tar Heels	Arkansas Razorbacks
(6–5)	(8–4)
ACC	SEC
20	10
Head coach: Mack Brown	Head coach: Danny Ford
	AP / Coaches / BA; 24 / 23 / 25
	1	2	3	4	Total
North Carolina	7	0	13	0	20
Arkansas	7	0	3	0	10
- Date: December 30, 1995
- Season: 1995
- Stadium: Joe Robbie Stadium
- Location: Miami Gardens, Florida
- MVP: RB Leon Johnson (North Carolina)
- Attendance: 34,428

United States TV coverage
- Network: TBS
- Announcers: Verne Lundquist and Pat Haden

The 1995 Carquest Bowl (December) was a college football postseason bowl game between the Arkansas Razorbacks and the North Carolina Tar Heels.

== Background ==
Arkansas finished first in the Western Division of the SEC, getting the chance to play Florida in the SEC Championship Game, though they would lose 34-3. This was their first bowl game since 1991. They had lost the last five bowl games they played in. The Tar Heels finished fifth in the Atlantic Coast Conference, with wins over Duke and NC State making them bowl eligible. They were in a bowl for the fourth time in eight seasons under Brown. The two teams had met just one time before, in the 1981 Gator Bowl, which the Tar Heels won, 31-27.

== Game summary ==
- Arkansas – Lucas 25 pass from Lunney (Latourette kick)
- North Carolina – Ashford 18 pass from M. Thomas (Welch kick)
- Arkansas – Latourette 26 FG
- North Carolina – L. Johnson 28 run (Welch kick)
- North Carolina – Stevens 87 pass from M. Thomas

Anthony Lucas caught a 25 yard pass from Barry Lunney to give the Razorbacks an early lead, but Darrin Ashford’s 18-yard TD catch from quarterback Mike Thomas tied the game at 7–7. The second quarter passed with no points. Todd Latourette gave the Hogs a 10–7 lead on his field goal in the third period, but the Tar Heels took the lead for the second and final time on Thomas' pitch to Johnson for 28 yards to make it 14–10. Thomas threw another touchdown pass, this time to L.C. Stevens, to make it 20–10 as the Tar Heels held on from there to win. Johnson ran for 195 yards on 29 carries and was named MVP.

== Aftermath ==
Arkansas reached just one more bowl game in the decade, while North Carolina reached three more. North Carolina returned to the bowl site (now called the Russell Athletic Bowl) in 2015, which they lost 49-38 to Baylor. Arkansas has never returned.

== Statistics ==
Statistics	Arkansas	North Carolina
First downs	26	20
Yards Rushing	44–162	49–242
Passing (C–A–I)	16–35–2	10–23–0
Passing yards	227	177
Total yards	389	419
Punts–average	4–38.8	4–32.5
Fumbles–lost	1–1	0–0
Penalties–yards	3–36	4–31
Possession time	30:03	29:07
