= 1995 All-Mid-American Conference football team =

The 1995 All-Mid-American Conference football team consists of American football players chosen for the All-Mid-American Conference ("MAC") teams for the 1995 NCAA Division I-A football season. MAC champion Toledo was undefeated but placed only three players on the first team: running back Wasean Tait, tight end Steve Rosi, and defensive lineman Steve Haynes. Miami (OH) finished in second place with an 8–2–1 record and placed five players on the first team: running back Deland McCullough, offensive lineman Mike Bird, linebackers Dee Osborne and Kenyon Harper, and defensive back Johnnie Williams.

== Offensive selections ==
=== Quarterbacks ===
- Charlie Batch, Eastern Michigan (Coaches-1)
- Ryan Huzjak, Toledo (Coaches-2)
- Jay McDonagh, Western Michigan (Coaches-2)

=== Running backs ===
- Deland McCullough, Miami (OH) (Coaches-1)
- Wasean Tait, Toledo (Coaches-1)
- Astron Whatley, Kent State (Coaches-1)
- Michael Blair, Ball State (Coaches-2)
- Silas Massey III, Central Michigan (Coaches-2)
- James Vackaro, Western Michigan (Coaches-2)

=== Wide receivers ===
- Steve Clay, Eastern Michigan (Coaches-1)
- Tony Knox Jr., Western Michigan (Coaches-1)
- Bristol Greene, Eastern Michigan (Coaches-2)
- Tremayne Banks, Miami (OH) (Coaches-2)

=== Tight ends ===
- Steve Rosi, Toledo (Coaches-1)
- Ryan Wheatley, Eastern Michigan (Coaches-2)

=== Offensive linemen ===
- Mike Bird, Miami (OH) (Coaches-1)
- Chad Bukey, Bowling Green (Coaches-1)
- Tony Roush, Ball State (Coaches-1)
- Barry Stokes, Eastern Michigan (Coaches-1)
- Brock Gutierrez, Central Michigan (Coaches-1)
- Bryan Carpenter, Central Michigan (Coaches-2)
- Gene Guidry, Miami (OH) (Coaches-2)
- Joe Lewandowski, Western Michigan (Coaches-2)
- Kevin Montgomery, Toledo (Coaches-2)
- Scott Rehberg, Central Michigan (Coaches-2)
- Matt Cravens, Miami (OH) (Coaches-2)

== Defensive selections ==
=== Defensive linemen ===
- Greg Cepek, Bowling Green (Coaches-1)
- Steve Haynes, Toledo (Coaches-1)
- Keith McKenzie, Ball State (Coaches-1)
- Dion Powell, Western Michigan (Coaches-1)
- Mike Barry, Kent State (Coaches-2)
- Jermaine Daniels, Ball State (Coaches-2)
- Jason Holmes, Miami (OH) (Coaches-2)
- Chris Rawson, Western Michigan (Coaches-2)

=== Linebackers ===
- Dee Osborne, Miami (OH) [OLB] (Coaches-1)
- Jason Woullard, Bowling Green [OLB] (Coaches-1)
- Kenyon Harper, Miami (OH) [ILB] (Coaches-1)
- Andre Vaughn, Western Michigan [ILB] (Coaches-1)
- Avery Brown, Eastern Michigan [OLB] (Coaches-2)
- Rick Lucas, Western Michigan [OLB] (Coaches-2)
- Dean Poice, Western Michigan [OLB] (Coaches-2)
- Benny King, Ohio [ILB] (Coaches-2)
- Howard Simms, Ball State [ILB] (Coaches-2)

=== Defensive backs ===
- Cory Gilliard, Ball State (Coaches-1)
- Tristan Moss, Western Michigan (Coaches-1)
- Johnnie Williams, Miami (OH) (Coaches-1)
- Quincy Wright, Central Michigan (Coaches-1)
- Jamal Bett, Toledo (Coaches-2)
- Craig Dues, Toledo (Coaches-2)
- Damiso Johnson, Ohio (Coaches-2)
- Jamie Taylor, Miami (OH) (Coaches-2)

== Special teams ==
=== Placekickers ===
- Derek Schoreis, Bowling Green (Coaches-1)
- Brad Blasy, Central Michigan (Coaches-2)

=== Punters ===
- Brad Maynard, Ball State (Coaches-1)
- Ty Grude, Toledo (Coaches-2)
