= 1995 Southwestern Louisiana Ragin' Cajuns football team =

American college football season

1995 Southwestern Louisiana Ragin' Cajuns football
- Conference: Big West Conference
- Record: 6–5 (4–2 Big West)
- Head coach: Nelson Stokley (10th season)
- Offensive coordinator: Lewis Cook (4th season)
- Home stadium: Cajun Field

1995 Big West Conference football standings
| | Conf. | | | | | Overall |
| Team | W | | L | | T | W | | L | | T |
|---|---|---|---|---|---|---|---|---|---|---|
| Nevada $ | 7 | – | 0 | – | 0 | 9 | – | 3 | – | 0 |
| Southwestern Louisiana | 4 | – | 2 | – | 0 | 6 | – | 5 | – | 0 |
| Utah State | 4 | – | 3 | – | 0 | 4 | – | 7 | – | 0 |
| Arkansas State | 3 | – | 3 | – | 0 | 6 | – | 5 | – | 0 |
| Northern Illinois | 3 | – | 3 | – | 0 | 3 | – | 8 | – | 0 |
| New Mexico State | 3 | – | 4 | – | 0 | 4 | – | 7 | – | 0 |
| San Jose State | 3 | – | 4 | – | 0 | 3 | – | 8 | – | 0 |
| Louisiana Tech | 2 | – | 4 | – | 0 | 5 | – | 6 | – | 0 |
| Pacific (CA) | 2 | – | 4 | – | 0 | 3 | – | 8 | – | 0 |
| UNLV | 1 | – | 5 | – | 0 | 2 | – | 9 | – | 0 |
$ – Conference champion

The 1995 Southwestern Louisiana Ragin' Cajuns football team was an American football team that represented the University of Southwestern Louisiana (now known as the University of Louisiana at Lafayette) in the Big West Conference during the 1995 NCAA Division I-A football season. In their tenth year under head coach Nelson Stokley, the Ragin' Cajuns compiled an 6–5 record.

== Schedule ==
| Date | Opponent | Site | Result | Attendance | Source |
|---|---|---|---|---|---|
| September 2 | at Nevada | Mackay Stadium; Reno, NV | L 14–38 | 25,446 | |
| September 9 | UAB* | Cajun Field; Lafayette, LA | W 56–21 | 17,723 | |
| September 16 | at Memphis* | Liberty Bowl Memorial Stadium; Memphis, TN | L 19–33 | | |
| September 23 | at Northern Illinois | Huskie Stadium; DeKalb, IL | L 24–25 | 14,187 | |
| October 7 | at Arkansas State | Indian Stadium; Jonesboro, AR | W 33–9 | | |
| October 14 | New Mexico State | Cajun Field; Lafayette, LA | W 43–26 | | |
| October 21 | Pacific (CA) | Cajun Field; Lafayette, LA | W 45–3 | | |
| October 28 | at Tulane* | Louisiana Superdome; New Orleans, LA | W 32–28 | 20,801 | |
| November 4 | Louisiana Tech | Cajun Field; Lafayette, LA (rivalry) | W 40–33 | 17,333 | |
| November 11 | at No. 15 Arkansas* | Razorback Stadium; Fayetteville, AR | L 13–24 | 44,567 | |
| November 18 | Southern Miss* | Cajun Field; Lafayette, LA | L 32–35 | 19,341 | |
*Non-conference game; Rankings from AP Poll released prior to the game
