= 1995 San Jose State Spartans football team =

American college football season

1995 San Jose State Spartans football
- Conference: Big West Conference
- Record: 3–8 (3–4 Big West)
- Head coach: John Ralston (3rd season)
- Offensive coordinator: Roger Theder (3rd season)
- Defensive coordinator: Mike Church (1st season)
- Home stadium: Spartan Stadium

1995 Big West Conference football standings
	Conf.					Overall
Team	W		L		T	W		L		T
Nevada $	7	–	0	–	0	9	–	3	–	0
Southwestern Louisiana	4	–	2	–	0	6	–	5	–	0
Utah State	4	–	3	–	0	4	–	7	–	0
Arkansas State	3	–	3	–	0	6	–	5	–	0
Northern Illinois	3	–	3	–	0	3	–	8	–	0
New Mexico State	3	–	4	–	0	4	–	7	–	0
San Jose State	3	–	4	–	0	3	–	8	–	0
Louisiana Tech	2	–	4	–	0	5	–	6	–	0
Pacific (CA)	2	–	4	–	0	3	–	8	–	0
UNLV	1	–	5	–	0	2	–	9	–	0
$ – Conference champion

The 1995 San Jose State Spartans football team represented San Jose State University during the 1995 NCAA Division I-A football season as a member of the Big West Conference. The team was led by head coach John Ralston, in his third year as head coach at San Jose State. They played home games at Spartan Stadium in San Jose, California. The Spartans finished the 1995 season with a record of three wins and eight losses (3–8, 3–4 Big West).

== Schedule ==
Date	Opponent	Site	Result	Attendance	Source
September 2	Stanford*	Spartan Stadium; San Jose, CA (rivalry)	L 33–47	28,467	
September 9	at No. 7 USC*	Los Angeles Memorial Coliseum; Los Angeles, CA	L 7–45	50,612	
September 16	Northern Illinois	Spartan Stadium; San Jose, CA	L 17–18	10,426	
September 23	at California*	California Memorial Stadium; Berkeley, CA	L 7–40		
September 30	at Utah State	Romney Stadium; Logan, UT	W 32–30	8,217	
October 14	UNLV^{†}	Spartan Stadium; San Jose, CA	W 52–14	11,423	
October 21	at San Diego State*	Jack Murphy Stadium; San Diego, CA	L 20–49	31,555	
October 28	Pacific (CA)	Spartan Stadium; San Jose, CA (Victory Bell)	L 30–32	9,367	
November 4	at Arkansas State	Indian Stadium; Jonesboro, AR	L 7–21		
November 11	at New Mexico State	Aggie Memorial Stadium; Las Cruces, NM	W 38–37		
November 18	at Nevada	Mackay Stadium; Reno, NV	L 28–45	21,853	
*Non-conference game; ^{†}Homecoming; Rankings from AP Poll released prior to the game

== Game summaries ==
=== Stanford ===
	1	2	3	4	Total
Cardinal					0
Spartans					0

=== At No. 7 USC ===
	1	2	3	4	Total
Spartans					0
No. 7 Trojans					0

=== Northern Illinois ===
	1	2	3	4	Total
Huskies					0
Spartans					0

=== At California ===
	1	2	3	4	Total
Spartans					0
Golden Bears					0

=== At Utah State ===
	1	2	3	4	Total
Spartans					0
Aggies					0

=== UNLV ===
	1	2	3	4	Total
Rebels					0
Spartans					0

=== At San Diego State ===
	1	2	3	4	Total
Spartans					0
Aztecs					0

=== Pacific (CA) ===
	1	2	3	4	Total
Tigers					0
Spartans					0

=== At Arkansas State ===
	1	2	3	4	Total
Spartans					0
Indians					0

=== At New Mexico State ===
	1	2	3	4	Total
Spartans					0
Aggies					0

=== At Nevada ===
	1	2	3	4	Total
Spartans					0
Wolf Pack					0

== Team players in the NFL ==
The following were selected in the 1996 NFL draft.

Player	Position	Round	Overall	NFL team
Brian Roche	Tight end	3	81	San Diego Chargers
