= 1995 Ball State Cardinals football team =

American college football season

1995 Ball State Cardinals football
- Conference: Mid-American Conference
- Record: 7–4 (6–2 MAC)
- Head coach: Bill Lynch (1st season)
- Home stadium: Ball State Stadium

1995 Mid-American Conference football standings
	Conf.					Overall
Team	W		L		T	W		L		T
No. 24 Toledo $	7	–	0	–	1	11	–	0	–	1
Miami (OH)	6	–	1	–	1	8	–	2	–	1
Ball State	6	–	2	–	0	7	–	4	–	0
Western Michigan	6	–	2	–	0	7	–	4	–	0
Eastern Michigan	5	–	3	–	0	6	–	5	–	0
Bowling Green	3	–	5	–	0	5	–	6	–	0
Central Michigan	2	–	6	–	0	4	–	7	–	0
Akron	2	–	6	–	0	2	–	9	–	0
Ohio	1	–	6	–	1	2	–	8	–	1
Kent State	0	–	7	–	1	1	–	9	–	1
$ – Conference champion; Rankings from AP Poll

The 1995 Ball State Cardinals football team was an American football team that represented Ball State University in the West Division of the Mid-American Conference (MAC) during the 1995 NCAA Division I-A football season. In its first season under head coach Bill Lynch, the team compiled a 7–4 record (6–2 against conference opponents) and finished in a tie for third place out of six teams in the MAC West. The team played its home games at Ball State Stadium in Muncie, Indiana.

The team's statistical leaders included Brent Baldwin with 1,192 passing yards, Michael Blair with 819 rushing yards, Ed Abernathy with 288 receiving yards, and Brent Lockliear with 52 points scored.

== Schedule ==
Date	Opponent	Site	Result	Attendance	Source
August 31	at Miami (OH)	Yager Stadium; Oxford, OH	W 17–15		
September 9	Western Illinois*	Ball State Stadium; Muncie, IN	W 20–17	14,466	
September 16	at Minnesota*	Hubert H. Humphrey Metrodome; Minneapolis, MN	L 7–31	48,420	
September 23	Western Michigan	Ball State Stadium; Muncie, IN	W 10–0		
September 30	at Purdue*	Ross–Ade Stadium; West Lafayette, IN	L 13–35	49,314	
October 7	at Toledo	Glass Bowl; Toledo, OH	L 14–17		
October 14	Bowling Green	Ball State Stadium; Muncie, IN	W 30–10		
October 21	Eastern Michigan	Ball State Stadium; Muncie, IN	L 35–40		
October 28	at Ohio	Peden Stadium; Athens, OH	W 6–3		
November 4	at Kent State	Dix Stadium; Kent, OH	W 28–13		
November 11	Central Michigan	Ball State Stadium; Muncie, IN	W 24–16		
*Non-conference game

== Roster ==
1995 Ball State Cardinals football team roster
Players
Coaches
Offense

Pos.	#	Name	Class
RB	27	Michael Blair	Sr

Defense

Pos.	#	Name	Class
DB	4	Cory Gilliard	Jr
DE	59	Keith McKenzie	Sr

Special teams

Pos.	#	Name	Class
P	7	Brad Maynard	Jr

Head coach

- Bill Lynch

Coordinators/assistant coaches

- Curt Mallory – Linebackers

Legend

- (C) Team captain
- (S) Suspended
- (I) Ineligible
- Injured
- Redshirt
