= 1995 Las Vegas Bowl =

- 4th Las Vegas Bowl
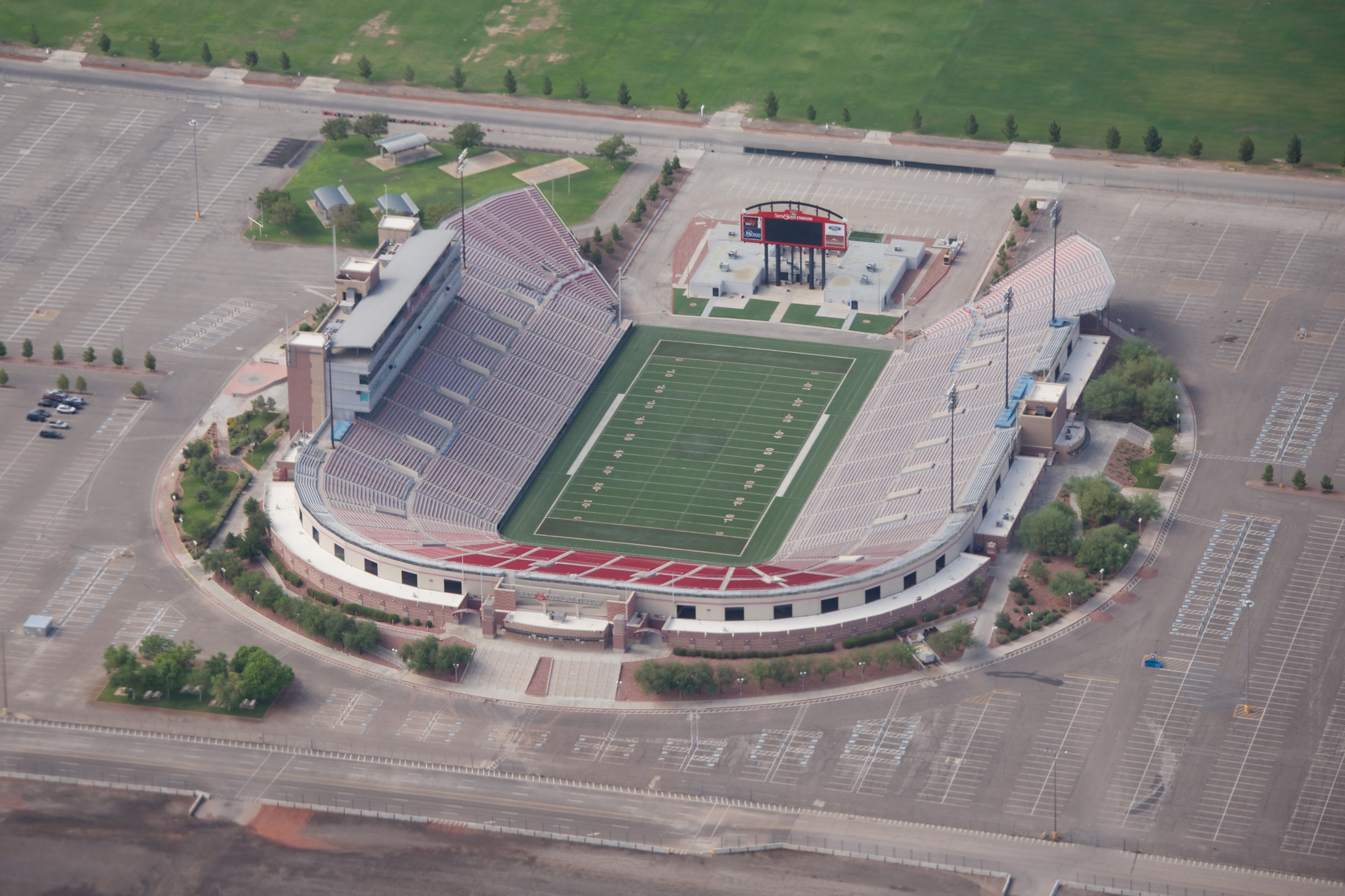
- Sam Boyd Stadium in Whitney, Nevada, hosted the Las Vegas Bowl.
| Toledo Rockets | Nevada Wolf Pack |
| (10–0–1) | (9–2) |
| MAC | Big West |
| 40 | 37 |
| Head coach: Gary Pinkel | Head coach: Chris Ault |
| AP / Coaches; 25 / NR |
| | 1 | 2 | 3 | 4 | OT | Total |
|---|---|---|---|---|---|---|
| Toledo | 7 | 14 | 6 | 7 | 6 | 40 |
| Nevada | 7 | 7 | 10 | 10 | 3 | 37 |
- Date: December 14, 1995
- Season: 1995
- Stadium: Sam Boyd Stadium
- Location: Whitney, Nevada
- MVP: Wasean Tait (RB, Toledo)
- Favorite: Toledo by 1 point
- Referee: Jack Gatto
- Attendance: 11,127
- Payout: US$175,000 per team

United States TV coverage
- Network: ESPN

The 1995 Las Vegas Bowl was an American college football bowl game played on December 14 at Sam Boyd Stadium in Whitney, Nevada. The fourth edition of the annual Las Vegas Bowl, the Thursday night game was a bowl rematch of the Toledo Rockets and Nevada Wolf Pack, who had played in Reno during the regular season. Toledo came into the game undefeated at 10–0–1, and Nevada had two losses.

This was the first Division I-A game to go into overtime, as the overtime rule was adopted starting with the 1995 bowl season. It remains the only Las Vegas Bowl to go to overtime, with Toledo winning 40–37 and capping an undefeated season.

== Game summary ==
In the first quarter, quarterback Ryan Huzjak scored on a 31-yard rushing touchdown, giving Toledo an early 7–0 lead. Nevada's Ken Minor scored on a 2-yard touchdown run, making it a 7–7 tie. In the second quarter, Wasean Tait scored on touchdown runs of 18 and 31 yards as Toledo claimed a 21–7 lead. With a minute left in the first half, Minor scored on a 1-yard touchdown run, as Nevada cut the deficit to 21–14 at halftime.

In the third quarter, Damon Shea kicked a 34-yard field goal to make the score 21–17 in favor of Toledo. Dwayne Harris of Toledo scored on a 16-yard touchdown run, but a missed extra point kept the margin at ten points. Nevada's Eric Bennett came back to score on a 4-yard touchdown run, to reduce Toledo's lead to three points at the end of three quarters.

In the fourth quarter, Tait scored on a 36-yard touchdown run to push the lead back up to 34–24 for Toledo. Minor answered with his third rushing touchdown of the game from a yard out, and Shea kicked a 26-yard field goal to tie the game at 34, which headed to overtime.

In overtime, Nevada was stopped and Shea kicked his third field goal, a 22-yarder to give the Wolf Pack its first lead of the game. Toledo needed just four running plays to win, as Tait rushed for his fourth touchdown from two yards as Toledo won 40–37 to cap an undefeated season. The Rockets finished at #24 in both major polls.

== See also ==
- List of college football post-season games that were rematches of regular season games
