= 1995 Central Michigan Chippewas football team =

American college football season

1995 Central Michigan Chippewas football
- Conference: Mid-American Conference
- Record: 4–7 (2–6 MAC)
- Head coach: Dick Flynn (2nd season)
- Offensive coordinator: Tom Kearly (5th season)
- Defensive coordinator: Jim Schulte (2nd season)
- MVP: Cory Gildersleeve
- Home stadium: Kelly/Shorts Stadium

1995 Mid-American Conference football standings
	Conf.					Overall
Team	W		L		T	W		L		T
No. 24 Toledo $	7	–	0	–	1	11	–	0	–	1
Miami (OH)	6	–	1	–	1	8	–	2	–	1
Ball State	6	–	2	–	0	7	–	4	–	0
Western Michigan	6	–	2	–	0	7	–	4	–	0
Eastern Michigan	5	–	3	–	0	6	–	5	–	0
Bowling Green	3	–	5	–	0	5	–	6	–	0
Central Michigan	2	–	6	–	0	4	–	7	–	0
Akron	2	–	6	–	0	2	–	9	–	0
Ohio	1	–	6	–	1	2	–	8	–	1
Kent State	0	–	7	–	1	1	–	9	–	1
$ – Conference champion; Rankings from AP Poll

The 1995 Central Michigan Chippewas football team represented Central Michigan University in the Mid-American Conference (MAC) during the 1995 NCAA Division I-A football season. In their second season under head coach Dick Flynn, the Chippewas compiled a 4–7 record (2–6 against MAC opponents), finished in seventh place in the MAC, and were outscored by their opponents, 276 to 255. The team played its home games in Kelly/Shorts Stadium in Mount Pleasant, Michigan, with attendance of 95,292 in five home games.

The team's statistical leaders included quarterback Chad Darnell with 1,737 passing yards, MAC Rookie of the Year Silas Massey with 1,089 rushing yards, and flanker Bryan Schorman with 604 receiving yards. Massey was named MAC Freshman of the Year. Linebacker Cory Gildersleeve was selected as the team's most valuable player. Center Brock Gutierrez and free safety Quincy Wright were selected as first-team All-MAC player.

== Schedule ==
Date	Opponent	Site	Result	Attendance	Source
September 9	Weber State*	Kelly/Shorts Stadium; Mount Pleasant, MI	W 39–31		
September 16	at East Carolina*	Dowdy–Ficklen Stadium; Greenville, NC	L 17–30	33,021	
September 23	Bowling Green	Kelly/Shorts Stadium; Mount Pleasant, MI	W 22–16		
September 30	at Akron	Rubber Bowl; Akron, OH	L 13–16		
October 7	at Eastern Michigan	Rynearson Stadium; Ypsilanti, MI (rivalry)	L 24–34		
October 14	at Youngstown State*	Stambaugh Stadium; Youngstown, OH	W 46–25	15,166	
October 21	Kent State	Kelly/Shorts Stadium; Mount Pleasant, MI	W 27–16		
October 28	Miami (OH)	Kelly/Shorts Stadium; Mount Pleasant, MI	L 13–17		
November 4	Toledo	Kelly/Shorts Stadium; Mount Pleasant, MI	L 7–19		
November 11	at Ball State	Ball State Stadium; Muncie, IN	L 16–24		
November 18	at Western Michigan	Waldo Stadium; Kalamazoo, MI (rivalry)	L 31–48		
*Non-conference game
