= 1995 Kent State Golden Flashes football team =

American college football season

1995 Kent State Golden Flashes football
- Conference: Mid-American Conference
- Record: 1–9–1 (0–7–1 MAC)
- Head coach: Jim Corrigall (2nd season)
- Offensive coordinator: Charley Molnar (2nd season)
- Defensive coordinator: Bob Junko (1st season)
- Home stadium: Dix Stadium

1995 Mid-American Conference football standings
	Conf.					Overall
Team	W		L		T	W		L		T
No. 24 Toledo $	7	–	0	–	1	11	–	0	–	1
Miami (OH)	6	–	1	–	1	8	–	2	–	1
Ball State	6	–	2	–	0	7	–	4	–	0
Western Michigan	6	–	2	–	0	7	–	4	–	0
Eastern Michigan	5	–	3	–	0	6	–	5	–	0
Bowling Green	3	–	5	–	0	5	–	6	–	0
Central Michigan	2	–	6	–	0	4	–	7	–	0
Akron	2	–	6	–	0	2	–	9	–	0
Ohio	1	–	6	–	1	2	–	8	–	1
Kent State	0	–	7	–	1	1	–	9	–	1
$ – Conference champion; Rankings from AP Poll

The 1995 Kent State Golden Flashes football team was an American football team that represented Kent State University in the Mid-American Conference (MAC) during the 1995 NCAA Division I-A football season. In their second season under head coach Jim Corrigall, the Golden Flashes compiled a 1–9–1 record (0–7–1 against MAC opponents), finished in last place in the MAC, and were outscored by all opponents by a combined total of 390 to 128.

The team's statistical leaders included Astron Whatley with 978 rushing yards, Todd Goebbel with 792 passing yards, and Kantroy Walker with 328 receiving yards.

== Schedule ==
Date	Time	Opponent	Site	Result	Attendance	Source
September 2	1:00 p.m.	No. 1 Youngstown State*	Dix Stadium; Kent, OH	W 17–14	17,516	
September 9	3:30 p.m.	Miami (OH)	Dix Stadium; Kent, OH	L 0–39		
September 16		at Ohio	Peden Stadium; Athens, OH	T 28–28		
September 23	1:00 p.m.	at West Virginia*	Mountaineer Field; Morgantown, WV	L 6–45	46,624	
September 30		Western Michigan	Dix Stadium; Kent, OH	L 6–52		
October 7	1:00 p.m.	at South Carolina*	Williams–Brice Stadium; Columbia, SC	L 14–77	66,807	
October 21		at Central Michigan	Kelly/Shorts Stadium; Mount Pleasant, MI	L 16–27		
October 28		at Akron	Rubber Bowl; Akron, OH (Wagon Wheel)	L 6–14		
November 4		Ball State	Dix Stadium; Kent, OH	L 13–28		
November 11		Bowling Green	Dix Stadium; Kent, OH (Anniversary Award)	L 15–26		
November 18		Eastern Michigan	Dix Stadium; Kent, OH	L 7–40		
*Non-conference game; Rankings from AP Poll released prior to the game; All times are in Eastern time
