= 1995 Western Michigan Broncos football team =

American college football season

1995 Western Michigan Broncos football
- Conference: Mid-American Conference
- Record: 7–4 (6–2 MAC)
- Head coach: Al Molde (9th season)
- Offensive coordinator: Rob Kuhlman
- Defensive coordinator: Larry Edlund
- MVPs: Jay McDonagh; Jim Vackaro
- Home stadium: Waldo Stadium

1995 Mid-American Conference football standings
	Conf.					Overall
Team	W		L		T	W		L		T
No. 24 Toledo $	7	–	0	–	1	11	–	0	–	1
Miami (OH)	6	–	1	–	1	8	–	2	–	1
Ball State	6	–	2	–	0	7	–	4	–	0
Western Michigan	6	–	2	–	0	7	–	4	–	0
Eastern Michigan	5	–	3	–	0	6	–	5	–	0
Bowling Green	3	–	5	–	0	5	–	6	–	0
Central Michigan	2	–	6	–	0	4	–	7	–	0
Akron	2	–	6	–	0	2	–	9	–	0
Ohio	1	–	6	–	1	2	–	8	–	1
Kent State	0	–	7	–	1	1	–	9	–	1
$ – Conference champion; Rankings from AP Poll

The 1995 Western Michigan Broncos football team represented Western Michigan University in the Mid-American Conference (MAC) during the 1995 NCAA Division I-A football season. In their ninth season under head coach Al Molde, the Broncos compiled a 7–4 record (6–2 against MAC opponents), finished in a tie for third place in the MAC, and outscored their opponents, 253 to 190. The team played its home games at Waldo Stadium in Kalamazoo, Michigan.

The team's statistical leaders included Jay McDonagh with 2,038 passing yards, Jim Vackaro with 702 rushing yards, and Tony Knox with 430 receiving yards.

== Schedule ==
Date	Opponent	Site	Result	Attendance	Source
August 31	Weber State*	Waldo Stadium; Kalamazoo, MI	W 28–21	20,958	
September 9	at Indiana*	Memorial Stadium; Bloomington, IN	L 10–24	30,856	
September 14	Toledo	Waldo Stadium; Kalamazoo, MI	L 21–31		
September 23	at Ball State	Ball State Stadium; Muncie, IN	L 0–10		
September 30	at Kent State	Dix Stadium; Kent, OH	W 52–6		
October 7	Akron	Waldo Stadium; Kalamazoo, MI	W 7–3		
October 14	at Ohio	Peden Stadium; Athens, OH	W 34–17		
October 21	at No. 13 Auburn*	Jordan-Hare Stadium; Auburn, AL	L 13–34	76,107	
October 28	Bowling Green	Waldo Stadium; Kalamazoo, MI	W 17–0		
November 11	at Eastern Michigan	Rynearson Stadium; Ypsilanti, MI	W 23–13		
November 18	Central Michigan	Waldo Stadium; Kalamazoo, MI (rivalry)	W 48–31		
*Non-conference game; Rankings from AP Poll released prior to the game
