= 1995 Pacific Tigers football team =

American college football season

1995 Pacific Tigers football
- Conference: Big West Conference
- Record: 3–8 (2–4 Big West)
- Head coach: Chuck Shelton (4th season)
- Offensive coordinator: Bill Bleil (4th season)
- Offensive scheme: Spread
- Defensive coordinator: Craig Wederquist (1st season)
- Base defense: 4–3
- Home stadium: Stagg Memorial Stadium

1995 Big West Conference football standings
	Conf.					Overall
Team	W		L		T	W		L		T
Nevada $	7	–	0	–	0	9	–	3	–	0
Southwestern Louisiana	4	–	2	–	0	6	–	5	–	0
Utah State	4	–	3	–	0	4	–	7	–	0
Arkansas State	3	–	3	–	0	6	–	5	–	0
Northern Illinois	3	–	3	–	0	3	–	8	–	0
New Mexico State	3	–	4	–	0	4	–	7	–	0
San Jose State	3	–	4	–	0	3	–	8	–	0
Louisiana Tech	2	–	4	–	0	5	–	6	–	0
Pacific (CA)	2	–	4	–	0	3	–	8	–	0
UNLV	1	–	5	–	0	2	–	9	–	0
$ – Conference champion

The 1995 Pacific Tigers football team represented the University of the Pacific as a member of Big West Conference during the 1995 NCAA Division I-A football season. Led by fourth-year head coach Chuck Shelton, Pacific compiled an overall record 3–8 with a conference mark of 2–4, tying for eighth place in the Big West. The Tigers offense scored 240 points while the defense allowed 439 points.

On December 20, 1995, the school announced it was dropping its football program, citing financial concerns.

== Schedule ==
Date	Time	Opponent	Site	Result	Attendance	Source
September 2		at No. 19 Arizona*	Arizona Stadium; Tucson, AZ	L 9–41	48,434	
September 9		Oregon State*	Stagg Memorial Stadium; Stockton, CA	W 23–10	10,763	
September 16		at Fresno State*	Bulldog Stadium; Fresno, CA	L 24–56	34,152	
September 23	11:00 a.m.	at No. 2 Nebraska*	Memorial Stadium; Lincoln, NE	L 7–49	75,630	
October 7	1:00 p.m.	at No. 17 Oregon*	Autzen Stadium; Eugene, OR	L 7–45	38,736	
October 14		Louisiana Tech^{†}	Stagg Memorial Stadium; Stockton, CA	W 47–41	14,231	
October 21		at Southwestern Louisiana	Cajun Field; Lafayette, LA	L 3–45	12,140	
October 28		at San Jose State	Spartan Stadium; San Jose, CA (Victory Bell)	W 32–30	9,367	
November 4		New Mexico State	Stagg Memorial Stadium; Stockton, CA	L 37–39	8,806	
November 11		Nevada	Stagg Memorial Stadium; Stockton, CA	L 29–45	9,252	
November 18		at Utah State	Romney Stadium; Logan, UT	L 22–38	7,317	
*Non-conference game; ^{†}Homecoming; Rankings from AP Poll released prior to the game; All times are in Pacific time

== Game summaries ==
=== At No. 19 Arizona ===
	1	2	3	4	Total
Tigers	3	0	0	6	9
No. 19 Wildcats	14	6	14	7	41

Statistics	PAC	ARIZ
First downs	12	23
Plays–yards	65–243	73–475
Rushes–yards	27–61	46–221
Passing yards	182	254
Passing: comp–att–int	18–38–1	15–27–1
Turnovers	2	2

Team	Category	Player	Statistics
Pacific	Passing	Chad Fotheringham	12/28, 84 yards, INT
Pacific	Rushing	Joe Abdullah	22 rushes, 63 yards
Pacific	Receiving	Damon Bowers	4 receptions, 32 yards
Arizona	Passing	Dan White	15/24, 254 yards, 4 TD, INT
Arizona	Rushing	Gary Taylor	11 rushes, 96 yards
Arizona	Receiving	Richard Dice	2 receptions, 98 yards, 2 TD

=== Oregon State ===
	1	2	3	4	Total
Beavers	0	0	3	7	10
Tigers	7	3	0	13	23

Statistics	ORST	PAC
First downs	17	20
Plays–yards	77–245	72–335
Rushes–yards	59–218	39–152
Passing yards	27	183
Passing: comp–att–int	2–18–1	17–33–1
Turnovers	5	3

Team	Category	Player	Statistics
Oregon State	Passing	Rahim Muhammad	1/2, 21 yards
Oregon State	Rushing	J. D. Stewart	11 rushes, 53 yards
Oregon State	Receiving	Cameron Reynolds	1 reception, 21 yards
Pacific	Passing	Chad Fotheringham	17/33, 183 yards, TD, INT
Pacific	Rushing	Joe Abdullah	25 rushes, 142 yards, TD
Pacific	Receiving	Eric Atkins	6 receptions, 80 yards, TD

=== At Fresno State ===
	1	2	3	4	Total
Tigers	0	10	7	7	24
Bulldogs	7	28	21	0	56

Statistics	PAC	FRES
First downs	24	12
Plays–yards	81–393	66–490
Rushes–yards	38–229	47–268
Passing yards	164	222
Passing: comp–att–int	15–43–1	14–19–1
Turnovers	3	3

Team	Category	Player	Statistics
Pacific	Passing	Nick Sellers	10/27, 130 yards, 3 TD, INT
Pacific	Rushing	Joe Abdullah	23 rushes, 166 yards
Pacific	Receiving	Eric Atkins	6 receptions, 71 yards, TD
Fresno State	Passing	Richie Donati	8/11, 114 yards, TD
Fresno State	Rushing	Jerome Oliver	18 rushes, 96 yards
Fresno State	Receiving	Charlie Jones	5 receptions, 86 yards, 2 TD

=== At No. 2 Nebraska ===
	1	2	3	4	Total
Tigers	0	0	7	0	7
No. 2 Cornhuskers	21	14	14	0	49

Statistics	PAC	NEB
First downs	7	36
Plays–yards	48–197	106–731
Rushes–yards	17–60	70–569
Passing yards	137	162
Passing: comp–att–int	14–31–1	16–36–2
Turnovers	1	2

Team	Category	Player	Statistics
Pacific	Passing	Nick Sellers	13/25, 132 yards, TD
Pacific	Rushing	Yasin Reeder	1 rush, 36 yards
Pacific	Receiving	Eric Atkins	3 receptions, 63 yards
Nebraska	Passing	Tommie Frazier	6/14, 90 yards, INT
Nebraska	Rushing	Damon Benning	10 rushes, 173 yards, 3 TD
Nebraska	Receiving	Clester Johnson	2 receptions, 31 yards

=== At No. 17 Oregon ===
	1	2	3	4	Total
Tigers	0	0	0	7	7
No. 17 Ducks	14	17	7	7	45

Statistics	PAC	ORE
First downs	10	28
Plays–yards	69–217	76–523
Rushes–yards	34–52	46–223
Passing yards	165	300
Passing: comp–att–int	13–35–1	18–30–0
Turnovers	3	0

Team	Category	Player	Statistics
Pacific	Passing	Graham Leigh	6/13, 113 yards, TD
Pacific	Rushing	Joe Abdullah	20 rushes, 48 yards
Pacific	Receiving	Greg Watson	2 receptions, 45 yards
Oregon	Passing	Tony Graziani	15/23, 222 yards, TD
Oregon	Rushing	Ricky Whittle	19 rushes, 130 yards, TD
Oregon	Receiving	Cristin McLemore	2 receptions, 95 yards, TD

=== Louisiana Tech ===
	1	2	3	4	Total
Bulldogs	14	14	0	13	41
Tigers	14	10	14	9	47

Statistics	LT	PAC
First downs	28	22
Plays–yards	78–599	65–387
Rushes–yards	36–154	34–155
Passing yards	445	232
Passing: comp–att–int	31–42–2	23–31–0
Turnovers	5	4

Team	Category	Player	Statistics
Louisiana Tech	Passing	Jason Martin	31/41, 445 yards, 4 TD, 2 INT
Louisiana Tech	Rushing	Lee Ragsdale	10 rushes, 54 yards
Louisiana Tech	Receiving	Chad Mackey	15 receptions, 263 yards, 2 TD
Pacific	Passing	Nick Sellers	23/31, 232 yards, 2 TD
Pacific	Rushing	Joe Abdullah	18 rushes, 113 yards, 2 TD
Pacific	Receiving	Eric Atkins	5 receptions, 89 yards

=== At Southwestern Louisiana ===
	1	2	3	4	Total
Tigers	0	0	3	0	3
Ragin' Cajuns	14	17	14	0	45

Statistics	PAC	USL
First downs	13	25
Plays–yards	61–181	75–554
Rushes–yards	26–52	51–298
Passing yards	129	256
Passing: comp–att–int	16–35–1	15–24–0
Turnovers	2	1

Team	Category	Player	Statistics
Pacific	Passing	Nick Sellers	9/23, 66 yards, INT
Pacific	Rushing	Joe Abdullah	15 rushes, 79 yards
Pacific	Receiving	Tyrone Watley	7 receptions, 53 yards
Southwestern Louisiana	Passing	Jake Delhomme	13/22, 235 yards, 3 TD
Southwestern Louisiana	Rushing	Marcus Prier	25 rushes, 186 yards, 2 TD
Southwestern Louisiana	Receiving	Brandon Stokley	5 receptions, 76 yards, TD

=== At San Jose State ===
	1	2	3	4	Total
Tigers	0	13	0	19	32
Spartans	6	3	7	14	30

Statistics	PAC	SJSU
First downs	24	27
Plays–yards	74–439	79–432
Rushes–yards	45–232	45–219
Passing yards	204	213
Passing: comp–att–int	16–29–2	19–34–2
Turnovers	2	3

Team	Category	Player	Statistics
Pacific	Passing	Graham Leigh	16/29, 204 yards, 3 TD, 2 INT
Pacific	Rushing	Joe Abdullah	39 rushes, 205 yards, 2 TD
Pacific	Receiving	Damon Bowers	3 receptions, 46 yards
San Jose State	Passing	Carl Dean	19/34, 213 yards, 2 TD, 2 INT
San Jose State	Rushing	Donald Lindsey	25 rushes, 178 yards, TD
San Jose State	Receiving	Brian Lundy	5 receptions, 56 yards, TD

=== New Mexico State ===
	1	2	3	4	Total
Aggies	19	10	3	7	39
Tigers	0	3	20	14	37

Statistics	NMSU	PAC
First downs		
Plays–yards		
Rushes–yards		
Passing yards		
Passing: comp–att–int		
Turnovers		

Team	Category	Player	Statistics
New Mexico State	Passing		
New Mexico State	Rushing		
New Mexico State	Receiving		
Pacific	Passing		
Pacific	Rushing		
Pacific	Receiving		

=== Nevada ===
	1	2	3	4	Total
Wolf Pack	14	10	7	14	45
Tigers	3	0	13	13	29

Statistics	NEV	PAC
First downs		
Plays–yards		
Rushes–yards		
Passing yards		
Passing: comp–att–int		
Turnovers		

Team	Category	Player	Statistics
Nevada	Passing		
Nevada	Rushing		
Nevada	Receiving		
Pacific	Passing		
Pacific	Rushing		
Pacific	Receiving		

=== At Utah State ===
	1	2	3	4	Total
Tigers	7	0	7	8	22
Aggies	7	28	3	0	38

Statistics	PAC	USU
First downs		
Plays–yards		
Rushes–yards		
Passing yards		
Passing: comp–att–int		
Turnovers		

Team	Category	Player	Statistics
Pacific	Passing		
Pacific	Rushing		
Pacific	Receiving		
Utah State	Passing		
Utah State	Rushing		
Utah State	Receiving		
