= Bill Lynch =

American football player and coach (born 1954)

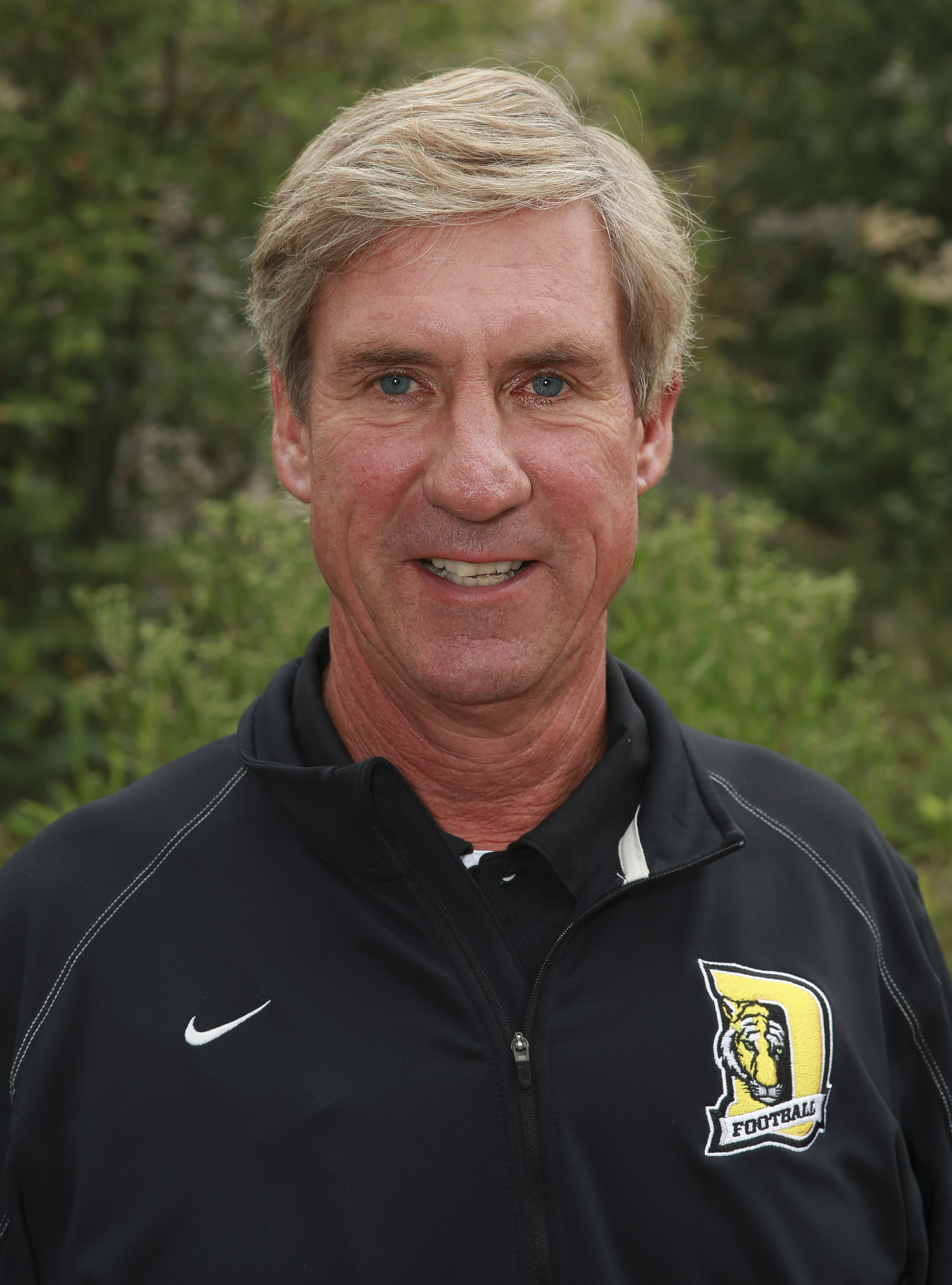
- Lynch, 2014

Biographical details
- Born: June 12, 1954 (age 72); Indianapolis, Indiana, U.S.

Playing career
- 1973–1976: Butler
- Position: Quarterback

Coaching career (HC unless noted)
- 1977: Butler (QB)
- 1978: Butler (WR)
- 1979–1983: Butler (OC)
- 1984: Northern Illinois (OC/QB)
- 1985: Orlando Renegades (QB)
- 1985–1989: Butler
- 1990–1992: Ball State (OC/QB)
- 1993–1994: Indiana (QB)
- 1995–2002: Ball State
- 2004: DePauw
- 2005–2007: Indiana (OC/TE)
- 2007–2010: Indiana
- 2013–2019: DePauw

Administrative career (AD unless noted)
- 2011–2012: Butler (associate AD)

Head coaching record
- Overall: 145–122–3
- Bowls: 0–2
- Tournaments: 0–1 (NCAA D-II playoffs)

Accomplishments and honors

Championships
- 4 HCC (1985, 1987–1989); 1 MAC (1996)

Bill Lynch (born June 12, 1954) is an American former football coach. He was most recently the head football coach at DePauw University, a position he held in 2004 and re-assumed in December 2012 until his retirement after the 2019 season. Lynch also served as the head football coach at Butler University (1985–1989), Ball State University (1995–2002), and Indiana University Bloomington (2007–2010). He was inducted into the Indiana Football Hall of Fame in 2005.

== High school and college ==
Lynch graduated from Bishop Chatard High School in Indianapolis in 1972. He moved on to Butler University where was a four-year letterwinner as the quarterback for the football squad and a captain of the basketball team. He quarterbacked the football team to a 28–12 record, led the nation in pass percentage in 1975, and often jokes that he "held" Larry Bird to 42 points in his final college basketball game.

== Early coaching career ==
After graduating from Butler, Lynch spent seven seasons as an assistant there, where his positions included wide receivers coach, quarterbacks coach, recruiting coordinator, and offensive coordinator. He then moved on to Northern Illinois University to assist former Indiana University coach Lee Corso for the 1984 season as the quarterbacks coach and offensive coordinator. During the winter of 1984, Lynch followed Corso and coached quarterbacks for the Orlando Renegades of the short-lived USFL.

In 1985, Lynch returned to Butler for five seasons as head coach. In four of those five years, his teams finished in the Top 20 Division II Poll. Lynch was then hired at Ball State University and worked from 1990 to 1992 as the quarterbacks coach and offensive coordinator before heading to Bloomington for the 1993 and 1994 seasons as quarterbacks coach for Bill Mallory's Indiana Hoosiers football team.

In 1995, Lynch returned to Ball State as head coach. His most successful year in Muncie came in 1996 when Lynch's Cardinals went 8–4, won the Mid-American Conference title, and played in the Las Vegas Bowl. Lynch was let go as head coach after the 2002 season. After a year off, Lynch was hired as the head coach at DePauw University. He led the Tigers football team to an 8–2 record and was named co-Southern Collegiate Athletic Conference Coach of the Year in his only season as head coach.

== Indiana University ==
Following his 2004 campaign at DePauw, Lynch resigned his duties as head coach to join long-time friend Terry Hoeppner, who had been hired as head coach at Indiana. There Lynch assumed the positions of assistant head coach, offensive coordinator, and tight ends coach. Under Lynch in 2006, the Hoosiers offense scored their most points since 2001 and quarterback Kellen Lewis enjoyed one of the best freshman seasons in school history.

In the spring of 2007, when Hoeppner took a leave of absence to attend to his health, Lynch took over spring practices and the daily work of head coach indefinitely. As Hoeppner's illness became worse, Lynch was named interim head coach for the 2007 season. Four days after this announcement, on June 19, Hoeppner died from complications of brain cancer.

In his first season as head coach, Lynch led the 2007 Hoosiers to a 7–6 record, the best for any Hoosier head coach in his first year since 1905 and the best record for an Indiana football team since 1993. The Hoosiers also earned their first bowl berth since 1993 with an invitation to the Insight Bowl to play Oklahoma State. After much speculation, Lynch signed a contract extension to coach the Hoosiers through 2012.

The 2008 Indiana team was hampered by a number of injuries. Against Wisconsin, the Hoosiers were forced to play three quarterbacks and four centers. 13 starters in total were injured during the year. Still, Lynch was able to pull in the one the strongest recruiting classes in recent history.

2009 showed marked improvement on the field, although the record ledger failed to show it as the team took 4th quarter leads into three Big Ten road games before falling short.

During Lynch's tenure, the players established a Player's Leadership Council, which elect weekly game captains and select the community service organizations the team volunteers with. The Boys and Girls Club of Bloomington and Riley Children's Hospital of Indianapolis are two favorite causes of the team.

On November 28, 2010, it was announced that Lynch would not return for the 2011 season.

== Later coaching career ==
After being let go by Indiana, Lynch became the associate athletic director at his alma mater, Butler University in Indianapolis. He held this position for nearly two years before being hired as the head football coach at DePauw University in Greencastle, Indiana. Lynch previously held this position for the 2004 season, leading the Tigers to an 8–2 record. Lynch replaced interim head coach Scott Srnka, who was promoted after Robby Long was fired mid-season.

The 2013 Tigers opened with four losses but won four of their final six games, finishing 4–6. DePauw improved to 7–3 in 2014, finishing third in the NCAC, then took a second place conference finish in 2015 with an 8–2 mark, repeating that in 2016 and 2017. He retired after the 2019 season with a final coaching record of 145–122–3.

== Family ==
Lynch and his wife, Linda, have four children. His son, Billy, is the head football coach at Delta High School (Muncie, Indiana). Another son, Joey, is a running backs analyst for Texas A&M. His youngest son Kevin is the head football coach at Butler University. All three played college football. They also have a daughter, Kelly, and nineteen grandchildren.

== Head coaching record ==
Year	Team	Overall	Conference	Standing	Bowl/playoffs	NCAA^{#}
Butler Bulldogs (Heartland Collegiate Conference) (1985–1989)
1985	Butler	8–2	5–1	T–1st		T–12
1986	Butler	5–5	3–3	T–3rd		
1987	Butler	8–1–1	4–0–1	1st		8
1988	Butler	8–2–1	3–0–1	1st	L NCAA Division II First Round	8
1989	Butler	7–2–1	4–0	1st		20
Butler:		36–12–3	19–4–1			
Ball State Cardinals (Mid-American Conference) (1995–2002)
1995	Ball State	7–4	6–2	T–3rd		
1996	Ball State	8–4	7–1	1st	L Las Vegas	
1997	Ball State	5–6	4–4	3rd (West)		
1998	Ball State	1–10	1–7	6th (West)		
1999	Ball State	0–11	0–8	6th (West)		
2000	Ball State	5–6	4–4	T–3rd (West)		
2001	Ball State	5–6	4–4	T–1st (West)		
2002	Ball State	6–6	4–4	4th (West)		
Ball State:		37–53	30–34			
DePauw Tigers (Southern Collegiate Athletic Conference) (2004)
2004	DePauw	8–2	5–1	2nd		
Indiana Hoosiers (Big Ten Conference) (2007–2010)
2007	Indiana	7–6	3–5	T–6th	L Insight	
2008	Indiana	3–9	1–7	11th		
2009	Indiana	4–8	1–7	T–10th		
2010	Indiana	5–7	1–7	11th		
Indiana:		19–30	6–26			
DePauw Tigers (North Coast Athletic Conference) (2013–2019)
2013	DePauw	4–6	4–5	T–5th		
2014	DePauw	7–3	6–3	3rd		
2015	DePauw	8–2	7–2	2nd		
2016	DePauw	8–2	7–2	T–2nd		
2017	DePauw	8–2	7–2	T–2nd		
2018	DePauw	4–6	4–5	T–5th		
2019	DePauw	6–4	6–3	T–2nd		
DePauw:		53–27	46–23			
Total:		145–122–3				
National championship Conference title Conference division title or championship game berth
