= 1995 New Mexico State Aggies football team =

American college football season

1995 New Mexico State Aggies football
- Conference: Big West Conference
- Record: 4–7 (3–4 Big West)
- Head coach: Jim Hess (6th season)
- Home stadium: Aggie Memorial Stadium

1995 Big West Conference football standings
	Conf.					Overall
Team	W		L		T	W		L		T
Nevada $	7	–	0	–	0	9	–	3	–	0
Southwestern Louisiana	4	–	2	–	0	6	–	5	–	0
Utah State	4	–	3	–	0	4	–	7	–	0
Arkansas State	3	–	3	–	0	6	–	5	–	0
Northern Illinois	3	–	3	–	0	3	–	8	–	0
New Mexico State	3	–	4	–	0	4	–	7	–	0
San Jose State	3	–	4	–	0	3	–	8	–	0
Louisiana Tech	2	–	4	–	0	5	–	6	–	0
Pacific (CA)	2	–	4	–	0	3	–	8	–	0
UNLV	1	–	5	–	0	2	–	9	–	0
$ – Conference champion

The 1995 New Mexico State Aggies football team was an American football team that represented New Mexico State University in the Big West Conference during the 1995 NCAA Division I-A football season. In their sixth year under head coach Jim Hess, the Aggies compiled a 4–7 record. The team played its home games at Aggie Memorial Stadium in Las Cruces, New Mexico.

== Schedule ==
Date	Opponent	Site	Result	Attendance	Source
September 2	UTEP*	Aggie Memorial Stadium; Las Cruces, NM (rivalry)	W 45–17	29,921	
September 9	Nevada	Aggie Memorial Stadium; Las Cruces, NM	L 24–45		
September 16	at No. 23 Georgia*	Sanford Stadium; Athens, GA	L 13–40	78,911	
September 23	at New Mexico*	University Stadium; Albuquerque, NM (rivalry)	L 24–36		
September 30	at Iowa*	Kinnick Stadium; Iowa City, IA	L 21–59	63,721	
October 7	Louisiana Tech	Aggie Memorial Stadium; Las Cruces, NM	W 48–13	13,603	
October 14	at Southwestern Louisiana	Cajun Field; Lafayette, LA	L 26–43		
October 21	Utah State	Aggie Memorial Stadium; Las Cruces, NM	L 14–24	13,357	
November 4	at Pacific (CA)	Stagg Memorial Stadium; Stockton, CA	W 39–37	8,806	
November 11	San Jose State	Aggie Memorial Stadium; Las Cruces, NM	L 37–38		
November 18	at UNLV	Sam Boyd Stadium; Whitney, NV	W 58–34	4,472	
*Non-conference game; Rankings from AP Poll released prior to the game
