= 1995 Akron Zips football team =

American college football season

1995 Akron Zips football
- Conference: Mid-American Conference
- Record: 2–9 (2–6 MAC)
- Head coach: Lee Owens (1st season)
- Offensive coordinator: Paul Winters (1st season)
- Defensive coordinator: David Snowball (1st season)
- Home stadium: Rubber Bowl

1995 Mid-American Conference football standings
	Conf.					Overall
Team	W		L		T	W		L		T
No. 24 Toledo $	7	–	0	–	1	11	–	0	–	1
Miami (OH)	6	–	1	–	1	8	–	2	–	1
Ball State	6	–	2	–	0	7	–	4	–	0
Western Michigan	6	–	2	–	0	7	–	4	–	0
Eastern Michigan	5	–	3	–	0	6	–	5	–	0
Bowling Green	3	–	5	–	0	5	–	6	–	0
Central Michigan	2	–	6	–	0	4	–	7	–	0
Akron	2	–	6	–	0	2	–	9	–	0
Ohio	1	–	6	–	1	2	–	8	–	1
Kent State	0	–	7	–	1	1	–	9	–	1
$ – Conference champion; Rankings from AP Poll

The 1995 Akron Zips football team represented Akron University in the 1995 NCAA Division I-A football season as members of the Mid-American Conference. They were led by first-year head coach Lee Owens. The Zips played their home games at the Rubber Bowl in Akron, Ohio. They finished the season with a record of 2–9 overall and 2–6 in MAC play to tie for seventh place.

This season was the last year of the Steel Tire rivalry series between Akron and Youngstown State, who'd met every year since 1967. The two teams are scheduled to meet next on September 5, 2020.

== Schedule ==
Date	Opponent	Site	Result	Attendance	Source
September 2	Eastern Michigan	Rubber Bowl; Akron, OH	L 29–49		
September 16	at Bowling Green	Doyt Perry Stadium; Bowling Green, OH	L 12–50		
September 23	at No. 19 Kansas State*	KSU Stadium; Manhattan, KS	L 0–67	33,145	
September 30	Central Michigan	Rubber Bowl; Akron, OH	W 16–13		
October 7	at Western Michigan	Waldo Stadium; Kalamazoo, MI	L 3–7		
October 14	at Virginia Tech*	Lane Stadium; Blacksburg, VA	L 27–77	40,688	
October 21	Ohio	Rubber Bowl; Akron, OH	L 23–29		
October 28	Kent State	Rubber Bowl; Akron, OH (Wagon Wheel)	W 14–6		
November 4	Youngstown State*	Rubber Bowl; Akron, OH (Steel Tire)	L 10–24		
November 11	at Toledo	Glass Bowl; Toledo, OH	L 7–41		
November 18	at Miami (OH)	Yager Stadium; Oxford, OH	L 0–65		
*Non-conference game; Rankings from AP Poll released prior to the game
