= 1995 Toledo Rockets football team =

American college football season

1995 Toledo Rockets football

MAC champion Las Vegas Bowl champion

Las Vegas Bowl, W 40–37^{OT} vs. Nevada
- Conference: Mid-American Conference

Ranking
- Coaches: No. 24
- AP: No. 24
- Record: 11–0–1 (7–0–1 MAC)
- Head coach: Gary Pinkel (5th season)
- Offensive coordinator: Mike Dunbar (4th season)
- Offensive scheme: Pro-style
- Defensive coordinator: Tom Amstutz (2nd season)
- Base defense: 4–4
- Home stadium: Glass Bowl

1995 Mid-American Conference football standings
	Conf.					Overall
Team	W		L		T	W		L		T
No. 24 Toledo $	7	–	0	–	1	11	–	0	–	1
Miami (OH)	6	–	1	–	1	8	–	2	–	1
Ball State	6	–	2	–	0	7	–	4	–	0
Western Michigan	6	–	2	–	0	7	–	4	–	0
Eastern Michigan	5	–	3	–	0	6	–	5	–	0
Bowling Green	3	–	5	–	0	5	–	6	–	0
Central Michigan	2	–	6	–	0	4	–	7	–	0
Akron	2	–	6	–	0	2	–	9	–	0
Ohio	1	–	6	–	1	2	–	8	–	1
Kent State	0	–	7	–	1	1	–	9	–	1
$ – Conference champion; Rankings from AP Poll

The 1995 Toledo Rockets football team was an American football team that represented the University of Toledo in the Mid-American Conference (MAC) during the 1995 NCAA Division I-A football season. In their fifth season under head coach Gary Pinkel, the Rockets compiled an 11–0–1 record (7–0–1 against MAC opponents), won the MAC championship, outscored all opponents by a combined total of 411 to 264, and defeated Nevada in the first ever overtime game in Division I-A football in the Las Vegas Bowl, 40–37.

The team's statistical leaders included Ryan Huzjak with 1,880 passing yards, Wasean Tait with 1,905 rushing yards, and Steven Rosi with 505 receiving yards.

== Schedule ==
Date	Opponent	Rank	Site	TV	Result	Attendance	Source
September 9	East Tennessee State*		Glass Bowl; Toledo, OH		W 41–20		
September 14	at Western Michigan		Waldo Stadium; Kalamazoo, MI		W 31–21		
September 23	at Nevada*		Mackay Stadium; Reno, NV		W 49–35	25,112	
September 30	at Cincinnati*		Nippert Stadium; Cincinnati, OH		W 45–31		
October 7	Ball State		Glass Bowl; Toledo, OH		W 17–14		
October 14	at Miami (OH)		Yager Stadium; Oxford, OH		T 28–28		
October 21	at Bowling Green		Doyt Perry Stadium; Bowling Green, OH (rivalry)		W 35–16		
October 28	Eastern Michigan		Glass Bowl; Toledo, OH		W 34–28		
November 4	at Central Michigan		Kelly/Shorts Stadium; Mount Pleasant, MI		W 19–7		
November 11	Akron		Glass Bowl; Toledo, OH		W 41–7		
November 18	Ohio		Glass Bowl; Toledo, OH		W 31–20		
December 14	vs. Nevada*	No. 25	Sam Boyd Stadium; Whitney, NV (Las Vegas Bowl)	ESPN	W 40–37 ^{OT}	11,127	
*Non-conference game; Rankings from AP Poll released prior to the game
