= 1995 Northern Illinois Huskies football team =

American college football season

1995 Northern Illinois Huskies football
- Conference: Big West Conference
- Record: 3–8 (3–3 Big West)
- Head coach: Charlie Sadler (3rd season)
- Captains: Derek Sholdice; Hollis Thomas
- Home stadium: Huskie Stadium

1995 Big West Conference football standings
	Conf.					Overall
Team	W		L		T	W		L		T
Nevada $	7	–	0	–	0	9	–	3	–	0
Southwestern Louisiana	4	–	2	–	0	6	–	5	–	0
Utah State	4	–	3	–	0	4	–	7	–	0
Arkansas State	3	–	3	–	0	6	–	5	–	0
Northern Illinois	3	–	3	–	0	3	–	8	–	0
New Mexico State	3	–	4	–	0	4	–	7	–	0
San Jose State	3	–	4	–	0	3	–	8	–	0
Louisiana Tech	2	–	4	–	0	5	–	6	–	0
Pacific (CA)	2	–	4	–	0	3	–	8	–	0
UNLV	1	–	5	–	0	2	–	9	–	0
$ – Conference champion

The 1995 Northern Illinois Huskies football team represented Northern Illinois University as a member of the Big West Conference during the 1995 NCAA Division I-A football season. Led by Charlie Sadler in his fifth and final season as head coach, the Huskies compiled an overall record of 3–8 with a mark of 3–3 in conference play, tying for fourth place in the Big West. Northern Illinois played home games at Huskie Stadium in DeKalb, Illinois. Running back Charles Talley led the team with 1,540 rushing yards, an average of 140.0 yards per game and 5.4 yards per carry.

== Schedule ==
Date	Time	Opponent	Site	TV	Result	Attendance	Source
August 31	7:00 pm	at Southern Miss*	M. M. Roberts Stadium; Hattiesburg, MS		L 13–45	33,092	
September 9	6:30 pm	Louisville*	Huskie Stadium; DeKalb, IL	SCC	L 21–34	22,357	
September 16	3:30 pm	at San Jose State	Spartan Stadium; San Jose, CA		W 18–17	10,426	
September 23	1:00 pm	Southwestern Louisiana	Huskie Stadium; DeKalb, IL		W 25–24	14,187	
September 30	1:10 pm	at No. 16 Kansas State*	KSU Stadium; Manhattan, KS		L 0–44	38,527	
October 7	3:00 pm	UNLV	Huskie Stadium; DeKalb, IL	SCC	W 62–14	22,805	
October 14	7:00 pm	at Utah State	Romney Stadium; Logan, UT		L 7–42	17,188	
October 28	3:00 pm	Cincinnati*	Huskie Stadium; DeKalb, IL	SCC	L 19–55	12,366	
November 4	12:00 pm	at No. 3 Florida*	Ben Hill Griffin Stadium; Gainesville, FL	SCC	L 20–58	84,922	
November 11	1:00 pm	Arkansas State	Huskie Stadium; DeKalb, IL		L 21–28	4,635	
November 18	3:00 pm	at Louisiana Tech	Joe Aillet Stadium; Ruston, LA		L 14–59	10,125	
*Non-conference game; Rankings from AP Poll released prior to the game; All times are in Central time
