= 1995 Arkansas State Indians football team =

American college football season

1995 Arkansas State Indians football
- Conference: Big West Conference
- Record: 6–5 (3–3 Big West)
- Head coach: John Bobo (3rd season)
- Offensive coordinator: Mike Hand (2nd season)
- Defensive coordinator: Pete McGinnis (4th season)
- Home stadium: Indian Stadium

1995 Big West Conference football standings
	Conf.					Overall
Team	W		L		T	W		L		T
Nevada $	7	–	0	–	0	9	–	3	–	0
Southwestern Louisiana	4	–	2	–	0	6	–	5	–	0
Utah State	4	–	3	–	0	4	–	7	–	0
Arkansas State	3	–	3	–	0	6	–	5	–	0
Northern Illinois	3	–	3	–	0	3	–	8	–	0
New Mexico State	3	–	4	–	0	4	–	7	–	0
San Jose State	3	–	4	–	0	3	–	8	–	0
Louisiana Tech	2	–	4	–	0	5	–	6	–	0
Pacific (CA)	2	–	4	–	0	3	–	8	–	0
UNLV	1	–	5	–	0	2	–	9	–	0
$ – Conference champion

The 1995 Arkansas State Indians football team represented Arkansas State University as a member of the Big West Conference during the 1995 NCAA Division I-A football season. Led by third-year head coach John Bobo, the Indians compiled an overall record of 6–5 with a mark of 3–3 in conference play, tying for fourth place in the Big West.

== Schedule ==
Date	Opponent	Site	Result	Attendance	Source
September 2	Utah State	Indian Stadium; Jonesboro, AR	W 21–17	10,117	
September 9	at UNLV	Sam Boyd Stadium; Whitney, NV	L 23–28	24,192	
September 16	Southern Illinois*	Indian Stadium; Jonesboro, AR	W 14–9	9,901	
September 23	at Louisiana Tech	Joe Aillet Stadium; Ruston, LA	L 25–28	18,615	
September 30	at Minnesota*	Hubert H. Humphrey Metrodome; Minneapolis, MN	L 7–55	42,472	
October 7	Southwestern Louisiana	Indian Stadium; Jonesboro, AR	L 9–33		
October 14	at No. 25 Texas Tech*	Jones AT&T Stadium; Lubbock, TX	L 25–63	37,521	
October 28	No. 24 (I-AA) Jacksonville State*^{†}	Indian Stadium; Jonesboro, AR	W 37–6	8,595	
November 4	San Jose State	Indian Stadium; Jonesboro, AR	W 21–7		
November 11	at Northern Illinois	Huskie Stadium; DeKalb, IL	W 28–21	4,635	
November 18	Mississippi Valley State*	Indian Stadium; Jonesboro, AR	W 55–3		
*Non-conference game; ^{†}Homecoming; Rankings from AP Poll released prior to the game
