= 1995 Eastern Michigan Eagles football team =

American college football season

1995 Eastern Michigan Eagles football
- Conference: Mid-American Conference
- Record: 6–5 (5–3 MAC)
- Head coach: Rick Rasnick (1st season)
- Defensive coordinator: Sam Gruneisen (1st season)
- Captains: Steve Clay; Kevin Kwiatkowski; Reese McCaskill; Barry Stokes
- Home stadium: Rynearson Stadium

1995 Mid-American Conference football standings
	Conf.					Overall
Team	W		L		T	W		L		T
No. 24 Toledo $	7	–	0	–	1	11	–	0	–	1
Miami (OH)	6	–	1	–	1	8	–	2	–	1
Ball State	6	–	2	–	0	7	–	4	–	0
Western Michigan	6	–	2	–	0	7	–	4	–	0
Eastern Michigan	5	–	3	–	0	6	–	5	–	0
Bowling Green	3	–	5	–	0	5	–	6	–	0
Central Michigan	2	–	6	–	0	4	–	7	–	0
Akron	2	–	6	–	0	2	–	9	–	0
Ohio	1	–	6	–	1	2	–	8	–	1
Kent State	0	–	7	–	1	1	–	9	–	1
$ – Conference champion; Rankings from AP Poll

The 1995 Eastern Michigan Eagles football team represented Eastern Michigan University in the 1995 NCAA Division I-A football season. In their first season under head coach Rick Rasnick, the Eagles compiled a 6–5 record (5–3 against conference opponents), finished in fifth place in the Mid-American Conference, and outscored their opponents, 363 to 335. The team's statistical leaders included Charlie Batch with 3,177 passing yards, Savon Edwards with 732 rushing yards, and Steve Clay with 999 receiving yards. Batch went on to play 15 years in the National Football League.

== Schedule ==
Date	Opponent	Site	Result	Attendance	Source
September 2	at Akron	Rubber Bowl; Akron, OH	W 49–29	13,181	
September 9	at Pittsburgh*	Pitt Stadium; Pittsburgh, PA	L 30–66	28,329	
September 16	UNLV*	Rynearson Stadium; Ypsilanti, MI	W 51–6	25,009	
September 23	Ohio^{†}	Rynearson Stadium; Ypsilanti, MI	W 31–20	23,083	
October 7	Central Michigan	Rynearson Stadium; Ypsilanti, MI (rivalry)	W 34–24	22,898	
October 14	at Syracuse*	Carrier Dome; Syracuse, NY	L 24–52	38,902	
October 21	at Ball State	Ball State Stadium; Muncie, IN	W 40–35	12,710	
October 28	at Toledo	Glass Bowl; Toledo, OH	L 28–34	26,104	
November 4	at Miami (OH)	Yager Stadium; Oxford, OH	L 23–39	13,926	
November 11	Western Michigan	Rynearson Stadium; Ypsilanti, MI	L 13–23	19,415	
November 18	at Kent State	Dix Stadium; Kent, OH	W 41–7	1,176	
*Non-conference game; ^{†}Homecoming
