= 1995 Louisiana Tech Bulldogs football team =

American college football season

1995 Louisiana Tech Bulldogs football
- Conference: Big West Conference
- Record: 5–6 (2–4 Big West)
- Head coach: Joe Raymond Peace (8th season)
- Offensive coordinator: Gary Crowton (1st season)
- Offensive scheme: Multiple
- Defensive coordinator: Pete Fredenburg (1st season)
- Base defense: 3–4
- Captains: Shannon Jenkins; Lance Reed; Grant Williams
- Home stadium: Joe Aillet Stadium

1995 Big West Conference football standings
	Conf.					Overall
Team	W		L		T	W		L		T
Nevada $	7	–	0	–	0	9	–	3	–	0
Southwestern Louisiana	4	–	2	–	0	6	–	5	–	0
Utah State	4	–	3	–	0	4	–	7	–	0
Arkansas State	3	–	3	–	0	6	–	5	–	0
Northern Illinois	3	–	3	–	0	3	–	8	–	0
New Mexico State	3	–	4	–	0	4	–	7	–	0
San Jose State	3	–	4	–	0	3	–	8	–	0
Louisiana Tech	2	–	4	–	0	5	–	6	–	0
Pacific (CA)	2	–	4	–	0	3	–	8	–	0
UNLV	1	–	5	–	0	2	–	9	–	0
$ – Conference champion

The 1995 Louisiana Tech Bulldogs football team was an American football team that represented Louisiana Tech University as a member of the Big West Conference during the 1995 NCAA Division I-A football season. In their eighth year under head coach Joe Raymond Peace, the team compiled an 5–6 record.

== Schedule ==
Date	Opponent	Site	Result	Attendance	Source
August 31	at Bowling Green*	Doyt Perry Stadium; Bowling Green, OH	W 28–21	22,222	
September 9	at Houston*	Robertson Stadium; Houston, TX	W 19–7	20,520	
September 16	at South Carolina*	Williams–Brice Stadium; Columbia, SC	L 21–68	70,411	
September 23	Arkansas State	Joe Aillet Stadium; Ruston, LA	W 28–25	18,615	
September 30	Tulsa*	Independence Stadium; Shreveport, LA	W 27–23	18,695	
October 7	at New Mexico State	Aggie Memorial Stadium; Las Cruces, NM	L 13–48	13,603	
October 14	at Pacific (CA)	Stagg Memorial Stadium; Stockton, CA	L 41–47	14,231	
October 21	Nevada	Joe Aillet Stadium; Ruston, LA	L 45–49	18,825	
November 4	at Southwestern Louisiana	Cajun Field; Lafayette, LA (rivalry)	L 33–40	17,333	
November 11	at Vanderbilt*	Vanderbilt Stadium; Nashville, TN	L 6–29	16,101	
November 18	Northern Illinois	Joe Aillet Stadium; Ruston, LA	W 59–14	10,125	
*Non-conference game
