= 1995 UNLV Rebels football team =

American college football season

1995 UNLV Rebels football
- Conference: Big West Conference
- Record: 2–9 (1–5 Big West)
- Head coach: Jeff Horton (2nd season)
- Offensive coordinator: Steve Hagen (2nd season)
- Defensive coordinator: Steve Eggen (2nd season)
- Home stadium: Sam Boyd Stadium

1995 Big West Conference football standings
	Conf.					Overall
Team	W		L		T	W		L		T
Nevada $	7	–	0	–	0	9	–	3	–	0
Southwestern Louisiana	4	–	2	–	0	6	–	5	–	0
Utah State	4	–	3	–	0	4	–	7	–	0
Arkansas State	3	–	3	–	0	6	–	5	–	0
Northern Illinois	3	–	3	–	0	3	–	8	–	0
New Mexico State	3	–	4	–	0	4	–	7	–	0
San Jose State	3	–	4	–	0	3	–	8	–	0
Louisiana Tech	2	–	4	–	0	5	–	6	–	0
Pacific (CA)	2	–	4	–	0	3	–	8	–	0
UNLV	1	–	5	–	0	2	–	9	–	0
$ – Conference champion

The 1995 UNLV Rebels football team was an American football team that represented the University of Nevada, Las Vegas (UNLV) as a member of the Big West Conference during the 1995 NCAA Division I-A football season. In their second year under head coach Jeff Horton, the Rebels compiled an overall record of 2–9 with a mark of 1–5 in conference play, placing last out of ten team in the Big West. The team played home games at Sam Boyd Stadium in Whitney, Nevada.

== Schedule ==
Date	Opponent	Site	Result	Attendance
September 2	at Rice*	Rice Stadium; Houston, TX	L 0–38	18,500
September 9	Arkansas State	Sam Boyd Stadium; Whitney, NV	W 28–23	24,192
September 16	at Eastern Michigan*	Rynearson Stadium; Ypsilanti, MI	L 6–51	25,009
September 23	at Iowa State*	Cyclone Stadium; Ames, IA	L 30–57	37,619
September 30	Hawaii*	Sam Boyd Stadium; Whitney, NV	L 30–58	15,764
October 7	at Northern Illinois	Huskie Stadium; DeKalb, IL	L 14–62	22,805
October 14	at San Jose State	Spartan Stadium; San Jose, CA	L 14–52	11,423
October 28	at Nevada	Mackay Stadium; Reno, NV (Fremont Cannon)	L 32–55	33,391
November 4	North Texas*	Sam Boyd Stadium; Whitney, NV	W 34–24	5,389
November 11	Utah State	Sam Boyd Stadium; Whitney, NV	L 0–42	5,041
November 18	New Mexico State	Sam Boyd Stadium; Whitney, NV	L 34–58	4,472
*Non-conference game
