= 1995 Ohio Bobcats football team =

American college football season

1995 Ohio Bobcats football
- Conference: Mid-American Conference
- Record: 2–8–1 (1–6–1 MAC)
- Head coach: Jim Grobe (1st season)
- Offensive coordinator: Mike Sewak (1st season)
- Defensive coordinator: Tim DeRuyter (1st season)
- Home stadium: Peden Stadium

1995 Mid-American Conference football standings
	Conf.					Overall
Team	W		L		T	W		L		T
No. 24 Toledo $	7	–	0	–	1	11	–	0	–	1
Miami (OH)	6	–	1	–	1	8	–	2	–	1
Ball State	6	–	2	–	0	7	–	4	–	0
Western Michigan	6	–	2	–	0	7	–	4	–	0
Eastern Michigan	5	–	3	–	0	6	–	5	–	0
Bowling Green	3	–	5	–	0	5	–	6	–	0
Central Michigan	2	–	6	–	0	4	–	7	–	0
Akron	2	–	6	–	0	2	–	9	–	0
Ohio	1	–	6	–	1	2	–	8	–	1
Kent State	0	–	7	–	1	1	–	9	–	1
$ – Conference champion; Rankings from AP Poll

The 1995 Ohio Bobcats football team was an American football team that represented Ohio University in the Mid-American Conference (MAC) during the 1995 NCAA Division I-A football season. In their first season under head coach Jim Grobe, the Bobcats compiled a 2–8–1 record (1–6–1 against MAC opponents), finished in ninth place in the MAC, and were outscored by all opponents by a combined total of 320 to 161. They played their home games in Peden Stadium in Athens, Ohio.

== Schedule ==
Date	Opponent	Site	TV	Result	Attendance	Source
August 31	at Iowa State*	Cyclone Stadium; Ames, IA		L 21–35	32,817	
September 9	Illinois State*	Peden Stadium; Athens, OH		W 14–6		
September 16	Kent State	Peden Stadium; Athens, OH		T 28–28		
September 23	at Eastern Michigan	Rynearson Stadium; Ypsilanti, MI		L 20–31		
September 30	at North Carolina*	Kenan Memorial Stadium; Chapel Hill, NC		L 0–62	43,200	
October 14	Western Michigan	Peden Stadium; Athens, OH		L 17–34		
October 21	at Akron	Rubber Bowl; Akron, OH		W 29–23		
October 28	Ball State	Peden Stadium; Athens, OH		L 3–6		
November 4	at Bowling Green	Doyt Perry Stadium; Bowling Green, OH		L 7–33		
November 11	Miami (OH)	Peden Stadium; Athens, OH (Battle of the Bricks)	ONN	L 2–30		
November 18	at Toledo	Glass Bowl; Toledo, OH		L 20–31		
*Non-conference game
