= 1995 Miami Redskins football team =

American college football season

1995 Miami Redskins football
- Conference: Mid-American Conference
- Record: 8–2–1 (6–1–1 MAC)
- Head coach: Randy Walker (6th season)
- Offensive coordinator: Kevin Wilson (4th season)
- Offensive scheme: I formation
- Defensive coordinator: Terry Hoeppner (1st season)
- Base defense: 4–3
- Home stadium: Yager Stadium

1995 Mid-American Conference football standings
	Conf.					Overall
Team	W		L		T	W		L		T
No. 24 Toledo $	7	–	0	–	1	11	–	0	–	1
Miami (OH)	6	–	1	–	1	8	–	2	–	1
Ball State	6	–	2	–	0	7	–	4	–	0
Western Michigan	6	–	2	–	0	7	–	4	–	0
Eastern Michigan	5	–	3	–	0	6	–	5	–	0
Bowling Green	3	–	5	–	0	5	–	6	–	0
Central Michigan	2	–	6	–	0	4	–	7	–	0
Akron	2	–	6	–	0	2	–	9	–	0
Ohio	1	–	6	–	1	2	–	8	–	1
Kent State	0	–	7	–	1	1	–	9	–	1
$ – Conference champion; Rankings from AP Poll

The 1995 Miami Redskins football team was an American football team that represented Miami University in the Mid-American Conference (MAC) during the 1995 NCAA Division I-A football season. In its sixth season under head coach Randy Walker, Miami compiled an 8–2–1 record (6–1–1 against MAC opponents), finished in second place in the MAC, and outscored all opponents by a combined total of 326 to 165.

The team's statistical leaders included Sam Ricketts with 1,337 passing yards, Deland McCullough with 1,627 rushing yards, and Tremayne Banks with 733 receiving yards.

== Schedule ==
Date	Time	Opponent	Site	TV	Result	Attendance
August 31	7:30 pm	Ball State	Yager Stadium; Oxford, OH		L 15–17	13,236
September 9	3:30 pm	at Kent State	Dix Stadium; Kent, OH		W 39–0	
September 16	12:00 pm	at No. 25 Northwestern*	Dyche Stadium; Evanston, IL	ESPN2	W 30–28	26,352
September 23	1:00 pm	Cincinnati*	Yager Stadium; Oxford, OH (Victory Bell)		W 23–16	
September 30	12:30 pm	at No. 8 Michigan*	Michigan Stadium; Ann Arbor, MI	PASS	L 19–38	104,484
October 7	2:10 pm	at Bowling Green	Doyt Perry Stadium; Bowling Green, OH		W 21–0	
October 14	2:00 pm	Toledo^{†}	Yager Stadium; Oxford, OH		T 28–28	
October 28	1:00 pm	at Central Michigan	Kelly/Shorts Stadium; Mount Pleasant, MI		W 17–13	
November 4	1:00 pm	Eastern Michigan	Yager Stadium; Oxford, OH		W 39–23	
November 11	1:00 pm	at Ohio	Peden Stadium; Athens, OH (Battle of the Bricks)	ONN	W 30–2	
November 18	1:00 pm	Akron	Yager Stadium; Oxford, OH		W 65–0	
*Non-conference game; ^{†}Homecoming; Rankings from AP Poll released prior to the game; All times are in Eastern time

== Roster ==
1995 Miami Redskins football team roster
Players			Coaches
Offense: Pos. / # / Name / Class; TE / 80 / Eric Beverly / Jr	Defense: Pos. / # / Name / Class	Special teams: Pos. / # / Name / Class	Head coach: Randy Walker; Coordinators/assistant coaches Kevin Wilson (Offensive Coordinator/OL) Terry Hoeppner (Defensive Coordinator) Tim Carras (Secondary) Jack Glowik (Defensive Line) Ron Johnson (Running Backs) Aaron Kromer (Tight Ends) Sean Payton (Quarterbacks) Jay Peterson (Linebackers) Sheldon White (Wide Receivers) Legend: (C) Team captain; (S) Suspended; (I) Ineligible; Injured; Redshirt
