= 1995 Nevada Wolf Pack football team =

American college football season

1995 Nevada Wolf Pack football

Big West champion

Las Vegas Bowl, L 37–40 vs. Toledo
- Conference: Big West Conference
- Record: 9–3 (6–0 Big West)
- Head coach: Chris Ault (19th season)
- Offensive scheme: Air Wolf
- Defensive coordinator: Mike Gillhamer (1st season)
- Base defense: 4–3 or 4–4
- Home stadium: Mackay Stadium

1995 Big West Conference football standings
	Conf.					Overall
Team	W		L		T	W		L		T
Nevada $	7	–	0	–	0	9	–	3	–	0
Southwestern Louisiana	4	–	2	–	0	6	–	5	–	0
Utah State	4	–	3	–	0	4	–	7	–	0
Arkansas State	3	–	3	–	0	6	–	5	–	0
Northern Illinois	3	–	3	–	0	3	–	8	–	0
New Mexico State	3	–	4	–	0	4	–	7	–	0
San Jose State	3	–	4	–	0	3	–	8	–	0
Louisiana Tech	2	–	4	–	0	5	–	6	–	0
Pacific (CA)	2	–	4	–	0	3	–	8	–	0
UNLV	1	–	5	–	0	2	–	9	–	0
$ – Conference champion

The 1995 Nevada Wolf Pack football team represented the University of Nevada, Reno during the 1995 NCAA Division I-A football season. Nevada competed as a member of the Big West Conference (BWC). The Wolf Pack were led by Chris Ault in his 19th overall and 2nd straight season since taking over as head coach for the second time in 1994 and later resigned from coaching at the end of the season to retain his job as athletic director. They played their home games at Mackay Stadium.

== Schedule ==
Date	Time	Opponent	Site	TV	Result	Attendance	Source
September 2		Southwest Louisiana	Mackay Stadium; Reno, NV		W 38–14	25,446	
September 9		at New Mexico State	Aggie Memorial Stadium; Las Cruces, NM		W 45–24		
September 23		Toledo*	Mackay Stadium; Reno, NV		L 35–49	25,112	
September 28		at San Diego State*	Jack Murphy Stadium; San Diego, CA	PSN	L 27–30	23,585	
October 7		North Texas*	Mackay Stadium; Reno, NV		W 56–24	18,458	
October 14	7:00 p.m.	Northeast Louisiana*^{†}	Mackay Stadium; Reno, NV		W 59–35	20,118	
October 21		at Louisiana Tech	Joe Aillet Stadium; Ruston, LA		W 49–45	18,825	
October 28		UNLV	Mackay Stadium; Reno, NV (Fremont Cannon)		W 55–32	33,391	
November 4		at Utah State	Romney Stadium; Logan, UT		W 30–25		
November 11		at Pacific (CA)	Stagg Memorial Stadium; Stockton, CA		W 45–29		
November 18		San Jose State	Mackay Stadium; Reno, NV		W 45–28	21,853	
December 14		vs. No. 25 Toledo*	Sam Boyd Stadium; Whitney, NV (Las Vegas Bowl)	ESPN	L 37–40 ^{OT}	11,127	
*Non-conference game; ^{†}Homecoming; Rankings from AP Poll released prior to the game; All times are in Pacific time

== Roster ==
1995 Nevada Wolf Pack football team roster
Players			Coaches
Offense: Pos. / # / Name / Class; QB / 11 / John Dutton / Jr	Defense: Pos. / # / Name / Class	Special teams: Pos. / # / Name / Class	Head coach: Chris Ault; Coordinators/assistant coaches: Ken Wilson (ILB); Legend: (C) Team captain; (S) Suspended; (I) Ineligible; Injured; Redshirt
