= 1995 Utah State Aggies football team =

American college football season

1995 Utah State Aggies football
- Conference: Big West Conference
- Record: 4–7 (4–3 Big West)
- Head coach: John L. Smith (1st season)
- Offensive coordinator: Bobby Petrino (1st season)
- Defensive coordinator: Chris Smeland (1st season)
- Home stadium: Romney Stadium

1995 Big West Conference football standings
	Conf.					Overall
Team	W		L		T	W		L		T
Nevada $	7	–	0	–	0	9	–	3	–	0
Southwestern Louisiana	4	–	2	–	0	6	–	5	–	0
Utah State	4	–	3	–	0	4	–	7	–	0
Arkansas State	3	–	3	–	0	6	–	5	–	0
Northern Illinois	3	–	3	–	0	3	–	8	–	0
New Mexico State	3	–	4	–	0	4	–	7	–	0
San Jose State	3	–	4	–	0	3	–	8	–	0
Louisiana Tech	2	–	4	–	0	5	–	6	–	0
Pacific (CA)	2	–	4	–	0	3	–	8	–	0
UNLV	1	–	5	–	0	2	–	9	–	0
$ – Conference champion

The 1995 Utah State Aggies football team represented Utah State University in the 1995 NCAA Division I-A football season. The Aggies were led by first-year head coach John L. Smith, who replaced Charlie Weatherbie after he left to coach Navy. The Aggies played their home games at Romney Stadium in Logan, Utah. Despite a difficult 0–5 start to the season, the Aggies won four of the next six and finished third in the Big West Conference.

== Schedule ==
Date	Opponent	Site	Result	Attendance	Source
September 2	at Arkansas State	Indian Stadium; Jonesboro, AR	L 17–21	10,117	
September 9	Boise State*	Romney Stadium; Logan, UT	L 14–38	20,909	
September 16	Southern Miss*	Romney Stadium; Logan, UT	L 21–24	15,277	
September 30	at San Jose State	Spartan Stadium; San Jose, CA	L 30–32	8,217	
October 7	Colorado State*	Romney Stadium; Logan, UT	L 17–59	16,071	
October 14	Northern Illinois	Romney Stadium; Logan, UT	W 42–7	17,188	
October 21	at New Mexico State	Aggie Memorial Stadium; Las Cruces, NM	W 27–14	13,357	
October 28	at Utah*	Robert Rice Stadium; Salt Lake City, UT (Battle of the Brothers, Beehive Boot)	L 20–40	28,337	
November 4	Nevada	Romney Stadium; Logan, UT	L 25–30	12,833	
November 11	at UNLV	Sam Boyd Stadium; Las Vegas, NV	W 42–0	5,041	
November 18	Pacific (CA)	Romney Stadium; Logan, UT	W 38–22	7,317	
*Non-conference game

== Season summary ==
Utah State finished the 1994 season with a record of 3-8, a disappointing year after having won a share of the Big West Conference championship and the Las Vegas Bowl in 1993. Head Coach Charlie Weatherbie abruptly left the Aggies on December 31, 1994 to coach at the US Naval Academy.

John L. Smith was subsequently hired away from the University of Idaho on January 3, 1995. Smith would fill his coaching staff primarily with coaches he had known at Idaho, including coordinators Bobby Petrino and Chris Smeland.

Utah State began the season in a frustrating, yet familiar, fashion as they would lose early and be unable to dig themselves out for a chance at bowl eligibility. Particularly frustrating in 1995 were the four losses in the first four games, where three games were decided by less than a touchdown and a home defeat to the Division I-AA Boise State Broncos. Failing to win two of the four games would eventually cost the Aggies a chance at a second bowl season in three years.

After another loss, this time to a strong Colorado State side, the Aggies won four of the remaining six games on the schedule. The Aggies finished with a 2-3 road record to go with a 2-4 home record.

The team was led offensively by running back Abu Wilson and wide receiver Kevin Alexander. Wilson amassed 1,476 rushing yards (5th most all-time) and 15 touchdowns (3rd most) during the 1995 season. Alexander pulled in 92 receptions (2nd most all-time) and 1,400 receiving yards (2nd most) for the season. Both players would earn First-Team All-Big West Conference honors.

Leading the way for the Aggies defensively was linebacker David Gill. The junior from Pleasanton, California would set a single season record for most tackles, with 168. It has since been surpassed only by Tony D'Amato's 170 tackles during the 1998 season. Danilo Robinson set the single game sack and tackle-for-loss record at Utah State during 1995 in a game against San Jose State, in which he accumulated five sacks and six TFLs. Gill was named to the All-Big West first team, and Robinson to the second team.

As a team, the Aggies had moments of success that could have carried them to a second Big West title in three years. However, at times the Aggies were undisciplined and prevented themselves from winning additional games. Nowhere was this lack of focus more obvious than the single-season records set by the 1995 team in penalties (116) and penalty yards (1,131). In just one loss to San Jose State, the Aggies gave up 185 penalty yards in a single game (the most ever by a Utah State team).

== Awards and honors ==
The Aggies had five players named to either the first or second all-conference team in the Big West.

Player	Position	Team
David Gill	LB	1ST
Kevin Alexander	WR	1ST
Micah Knorr	PK	1ST
Abu Wilson	RB	1ST
Danilo Robinson	DL	2ND
