= 1995 Bowling Green Falcons football team =

American college football season

1995 Bowling Green Falcons football
- Conference: Mid-American Conference
- Record: 5–6 (3–5 MAC)
- Head coach: Gary Blackney (5th season)
- Offensive coordinator: Terry Malone (1st season)
- Defensive coordinator: Paul Ferraro (5th season)
- Home stadium: Doyt Perry Stadium

1995 Mid-American Conference football standings
	Conf.					Overall
Team	W		L		T	W		L		T
No. 24 Toledo $	7	–	0	–	1	11	–	0	–	1
Miami (OH)	6	–	1	–	1	8	–	2	–	1
Ball State	6	–	2	–	0	7	–	4	–	0
Western Michigan	6	–	2	–	0	7	–	4	–	0
Eastern Michigan	5	–	3	–	0	6	–	5	–	0
Bowling Green	3	–	5	–	0	5	–	6	–	0
Central Michigan	2	–	6	–	0	4	–	7	–	0
Akron	2	–	6	–	0	2	–	9	–	0
Ohio	1	–	6	–	1	2	–	8	–	1
Kent State	0	–	7	–	1	1	–	9	–	1
$ – Conference champion; Rankings from AP Poll

The 1995 Bowling Green Falcons football team was an American football team that represented Bowling Green University in the Mid-American Conference (MAC) during the 1995 NCAA Division I-A football season. In their fifth season under head coach Gary Blackney, the Falcons compiled a 5–6 record (3–5 against MAC opponents), finished in sixth place in the MAC, and were outscored by all opponents by a combined total of 228 to 226.

The team's statistical leaders included Ryan Henry with 938 passing yards, Keylan Cates with 866 rushing yards, and Eric Starks with 433 receiving yards.

== Schedule ==
Date	Opponent	Site	Result	Attendance	Source
August 31	Louisiana Tech*	Doyt Perry Stadium; Bowling Green, OH	L 21–28	22,222	
September 9	at Missouri*	Faurot Field; Columbia, MO	W 17–10	35,154	
September 16	Akron	Doyt Perry Stadium; Bowling Green, OH	W 50–12		
September 23	at Central Michigan	Kelly/Shorts Stadium; Mount Pleasant, MI	L 16–22		
September 30	at Temple*	Veterans Stadium; Philadelphia, PA	W 37–31	3,739	
October 7	Miami (OH)	Doyt Perry Stadium; Bowling Green, OH	L 0–21		
October 14	at Ball State	Ball State Stadium; Muncie, IN	L 10–30		
October 21	Toledo	Doyt Perry Stadium; Bowling Green, OH (rivalry)	L 16–35		
October 28	at Western Michigan	Waldo Stadium; Kalamazoo, MI	L 0–17		
November 4	Ohio	Doyt Perry Stadium; Bowling Green, OH	W 33–7		
November 11	at Kent State	Dix Stadium; Kent, OH (Anniversary Award)	W 26–15		
*Non-conference game
