= Silas Massey =

American football player

Profile
- Position: Running back

Personal information
- Born: c. 1977
- Listed height: 5 ft 8 in (1.73 m)
- Listed weight: 180 lb (82 kg)

Career information
- College: Central Michigan (1995-1996, 1998)

Silas Massey (born c. 1977) is a former American football running back for the Central Michigan Chippewas in 1995, 1996, and 1998. He was selected as the Mid-American Conference Freshman of the Year in 1995 after gaining 1,089 rushing yards. In 1996, he ranked sixth among major-college players with 1,544 rushing yards on 312 carries, an average of 4.9 yards per carry. He missed the 1997 season due to a torn anterior cruciate ligament in his left knee. He attempted a comeback in 1998, but was limited to 203 rushing yards in six games. He concluded his college career with 2,836 rushing yards, 162 receiving yards, 735 yards on kick returns, and 26 touchdowns.

== See also ==
- 1996 NCAA Division I-A football season#Rushing
