= Deland McCullough =

American football player and coach (born 1972)

Oklahoma Sooners
- Title: Running backs coach

Personal information
- Born: December 1, 1972 (age 53); Pittsburgh, Pennsylvania, U.S.
- Listed height: 5 ft 11 in (1.80 m)
- Listed weight: 195 lb (88 kg)

Career information
- Position: Running back
- College: Miami (OH)
- NFL draft: 1996: undrafted

Career history

Playing
- Cincinnati Bengals (1996); Philadelphia Eagles (1997)*; Winnipeg Blue Bombers (1998–1999)
- * Offseason or practice squad member only

Coaching
- Harmony Community School (2000–2004) Head coach; Miami (OH) (2010) Coaching intern; Indiana (2011–2016) Running backs coach; USC (2017) Running backs coach; Kansas City Chiefs (2018–2020) Running backs coach; Indiana (2021) Associate head coach & running backs coach; Notre Dame (2022–2023) Running backs coach; Notre Dame (2024) Associate head coach & running backs coach; Las Vegas Raiders (2025) Running backs coach; Oklahoma (2026–present) Running backs coach

Awards and highlights
- As player: MAC Freshman of the Year (1992); As coach: Super Bowl champion (LIV)

Deland Scott McCullough (born Jon Briggs on December 1, 1972) is an American football coach and former running back who is the running backs coach for the Oklahoma Sooners of the Southeastern Conference (SEC). He played for the Cincinnati Bengals in the NFL and played Canadian football for the Winnipeg Blue Bombers of the Canadian Football League (CFL). He played college football for the Miami RedHawks. In 2020, McCullough won his first Super Bowl when the Chiefs defeated the San Francisco 49ers 31–20 in Super Bowl LIV.

== Career ==
In 2020, while working as the running backs coach for the Kansas City Chiefs, McCullough won his first Super Bowl when the Chiefs defeated the San Francisco 49ers 31–20 in Super Bowl LIV.

On February 8, 2021, McCullough was hired by the Indiana Hoosiers as their running backs coach.

In February 2022, the Notre Dame Fighting Irish hired McCullough as their new running backs coach.

On February 9, 2025, the Las Vegas Raiders hired McCullough to serve as their running backs coach.

== Personal life ==
McCullough, born Jon Briggs, was placed for adoption as a newborn, but reunited with his biological mother in November 2017. He found out from her that his mentor, Sherman Smith, is his biological father, as depicted in the Kendrick Brothers 2021 film, Show Me the Father.

McCullough has four sons; Deland II, Dasan, Daeh, and Diem. Deland II and Dasan previously played for Indiana University and Daeh and Dasan also played at the University of Oklahoma together.
