= Cory Gilliard =

American football player (born 1974)

No. 30, 40
- Position: Defensive back

Personal information
- Born: October 10, 1974 (age 52); The Bronx, New York, U.S.
- Listed height: 6 ft 0 in (1.83 m)
- Listed weight: 210 lb (95 kg)

Career information
- High school: Danbury (CT), Indianapolis (IN) North Central
- College: Ball State
- NFL draft: 1997: 4th round, 124th overall pick

Career history
- Denver Broncos (1997)*; New Orleans Saints (1997)*; Cincinnati Bengals (1997); Frankfurt Galaxy (1999); New England Patriots (1999); Orlando Rage (2001)
- * Offseason or practice squad member only

Awards and highlights
- First-team All-MAC (1996)
- Stats at Pro Football Reference

Cory Rashad Gilliard (born October 10, 1974) is an American former professional football defensive back. He played for the Cincinnati Bengals in 1997 and the Orlando Rage in 2001.
