= Mackay Stadium =

Collegiate athletics stadium in Reno, Nevada, United States

- Chris Ault Field
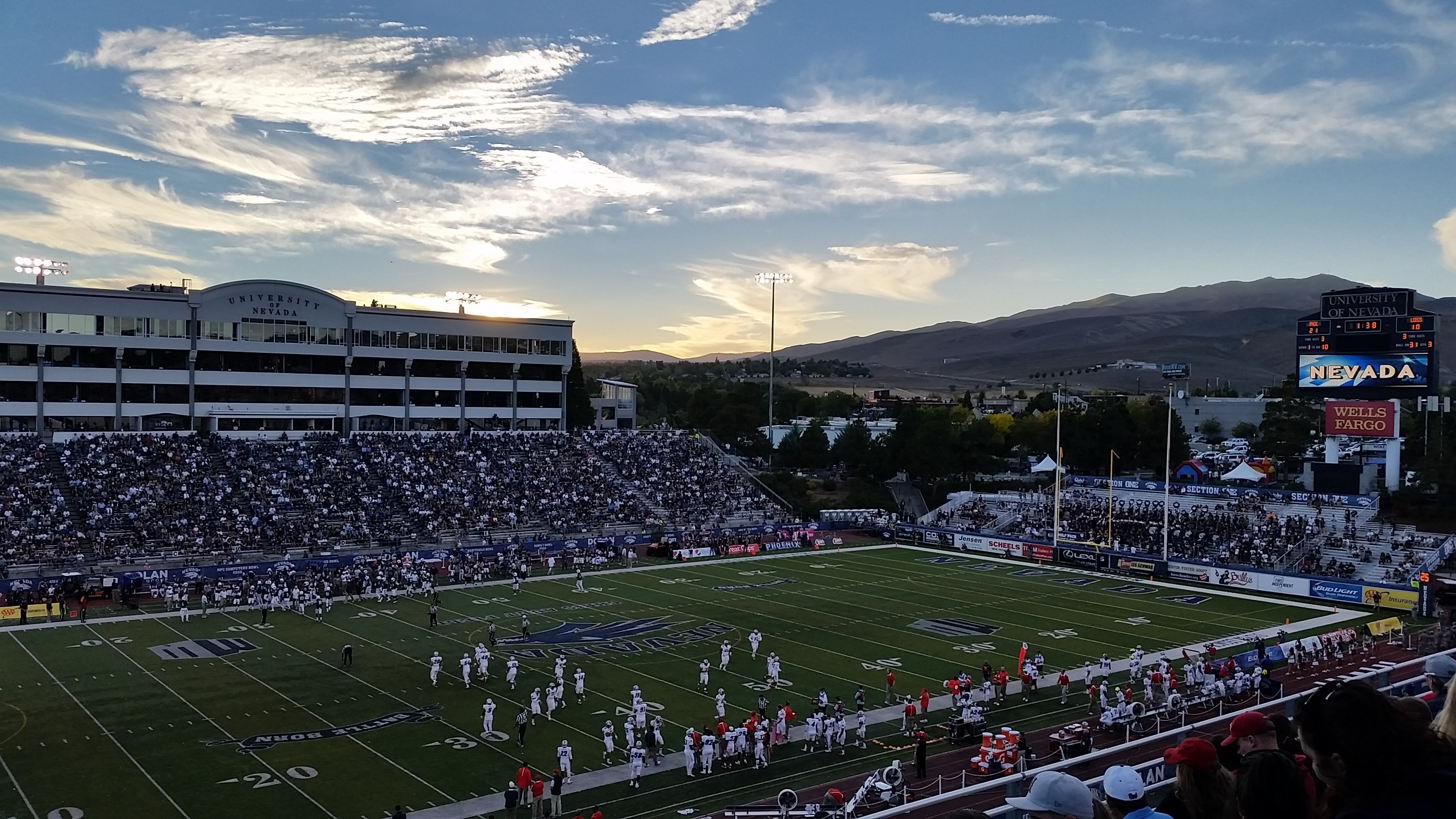
- View from the upper southeast corner vs. New Mexico on October 10, 2015

- Location within the United States Location within Nevada
- Interactive map of Mackay Stadium
- Address: 1664 North Virginia Street
- Location: University of Nevada, Reno; Reno, Nevada, U.S.
- Coordinates: 39°32′49″N 119°49′3″W
- Elevation: 4,610 feet (1,410 m) AMSL
- Owner: University of Nevada, Reno
- Operator: University of Nevada, Reno
- Capacity: 7,500 (1966–1977); 14,000 (1978–1990); 26,000 (1991 and 2016); 31,545 (1992–2005); 29,993 (2006–2012); 30,000 (2013–2015, 2021 and 2024–present); 27,000 (2017–2020 and 2022–2023)
- Surface: Natural grass (1966–1999); FieldTurf (2000–present)
- Record attendance: 33,391 (vs. UNLV, 1995)

Construction
- Groundbreaking: June 11, 1964; 62 years ago
- Opened: October 1, 1966; 59 years ago
- Expanded: 1978, 1990–1992 and 2006
- Cost: $11.5 million (2016 renovation) $6.5 million (previous expansions)
- Architect: Worth Group Architects (previous expansions)

Tenants
- Nevada Wolf Pack (NCAA); Football (1966–present); Women's soccer (2002–present)

Mackay Stadium is an outdoor athletic stadium in the western United States, located on the campus of the University of Nevada, Reno. The home venue for Nevada Wolf Pack football and women's soccer in the Mountain West Conference, it is named in honor of the Mackay family, particularly John William Mackay and his son Clarence Mackay, who donated funding to build the original stadium in 1909.

== History ==
Located on the northern portion of campus, at 17th Street & East Stadium Way, the stadium opened 59 years ago on October 1, 1966, with a seating capacity of 7,500. It replaced the original Mackay Stadium, formerly located in the bowl containing Hilliard Plaza, the Mack Social Sciences building and the Reynolds School of Journalism. Both stadiums were named for the Mackay family, who were university benefactors in the early years of the school. The stadium currently seats 27,000 and has played to crowds in excess.

The field is aligned northwest to southeast, at an elevation of 4,610 feet (1,405 m) above sea level, with the press box on the southwest sideline.

=== Renovations ===
Permanent lighting was installed in 2003 to allow the option of night games. Originally natural grass, synthetic infilled FieldTurf was installed in 2000, 2010, and 2022. In 2013, the playing surface at Mackay Stadium was named Chris Ault Field in honor of the former Wolf Pack head coach, College Football Hall of Famer, creator of the Pistol offense in 2004 and for his contributions to Wolf Pack football. Due to a $1.3 million sponsorship of the 2022 turf replacement, the stadium's playing surface is now officially referred to as "Chris Ault Field presented by ITS Logistics."

A proposal passed by the Nevada Board of Regents (NSHE) upgraded seating options to the stadium for the 2016 season. This renovation has improved the quality of the fans' experiences but decreased the overall stadium capacity to 26,000. Higher ticket fees in the upgraded sections will repay this $11.5 million bond by 2031.

== Attendance ==
The Wolf Pack football single–season attendance record was set in 1991 with a total of 180,457 fans over nine home games, including playoffs; and the regular-season attendance record was set at 151,081 fans in 1993. The single-season attendance record for a Wolf Pack team with a losing record (at 149,635 fans) was set in 2013. 2014 was the third football season to have at least 20,000 fans in attendance at every home game (1993 and 2013), although multiple seasons were close.

=== Top 25 single-game attendance records ===
Rank	Attendance	Opponent	Result	Date
1.	33,391 (sellout)	UNLV	Won, 55–32	October 28, 1995
2.	32,521 (sellout)	UNLV	Loss, 22–27	October 26, 2013
3.	32,327 (sellout)	Boise State	Loss, 46–51	October 4, 2014
4.	31,900 (sellout)	UNLV	Loss, 12–16	October 4, 2003
5.	30,712 (sellout)	Boise State	Won, 34–31 (OT)	November 26, 2010
6.	30,420	Oregon	Loss, 20–24	September 13, 1997
7.	30,118	UNLV	Won, 31–14	September 6, 1997
8.	30,017 (sellout)	Boise State	Loss, 21–27	December 1, 2012
9.	29,551	UNLV	Loss, 17–23	October 3, 2015
10.	29,167	Oregon State	Loss, 13–28	September 4, 1999
11.	28,960 (sellout)	UNLV	Won, 51–20	October 29, 2021
12.	28,809	California	Won, 52–31	September 17, 2010
13.	28,631	San Jose State	Won, 46–45	November 6, 1993
14.	28,523	Boise State	Won, 38–10	September 11, 1993
15.	27,668 (sellout)	Boise State	Won, 17–14	October 26, 1991
16.	27,057	Boise State	Loss, 34–41	November 22, 2008
17.	27,052	UC Davis	Won, 36–7	September 7, 2013
18.	26,866	UNLV	Won, 49–14	October 2, 1993
19.	26,023	Washington State	Won, 24–13	September 5, 2014
20.	25,978	UNLV	Won, 37–0	October 8, 2011
21.	25,804	New Mexico State	Won, 35–21	October 24, 1992
22.	25,506	Boise State	Loss, 7–38	November 25, 2006
23.	25,446	Southwestern Louisiana	Won, 38–14	September 2, 1995
24.	25,330	Boise State	Won, 66–28	October 12, 1996
25.	25,278	UNLV	Won, 27–20	September 29, 2007

=== Top 10 season average attendance records ===
Rank	Season	Avg. attendance	# of Home Games	Overall Attendance	Record
1.	1993	25,180	6 games	151,081	7–4
2.	2013	24,939	6 games	149,635	4–8
3.	1997	24,514	6 games	147,086	5–6
4.	1995	24,063	6 games	144,378	9–3
5.	2014	23,862	6 games	143,172	7–5
6.	2012	23,432	6 games	140,591	7–6
7.	1996	22,904	5 games	114,518	9–3
8.	2003	22,258	6 games	133,546	6–6
9.	2015	22,170	6 games	133,022	7–6
10.	1992	22,022	6 games	132,133	7–5

=== Top 10 season overall attendance records ===
Rank	Season	Overall Attendance	# of Home Games	Record
1.	1991	180,457 (151,019 before playoffs)	9 games (7 season, 2 playoff)	12–1
2.	1993	151,081	6 games	7–4
3.	2013	149,635	6 games	4–8
4.	1997	147,086	6 games	5–6
5.	1995	144,378	6 games	9–3
6.	2014	143,172	6 games	7–5
7.	1990	141,643	9 games (6 season, 3 playoff)	13–2
8.	2012	140,591	6 games	7–6
9.	2010	137,032	7 games	13–1
10.	1986	136,021	10 games (7 season, 3 playoff)	13–1

== Other uses ==
The Nevada women's soccer team played home games for their inaugural 2000 season at Mendive Middle School in Sparks, Nevada. The following 2001 season, the Pack did not host any soccer home games. Mackay Stadium has played home to the women's soccer team since 2002, with occasional home matches being played offsite at the Moana Sports Complex (the previous site of Moana Stadium) in Reno, Nevada.

Mackay Stadium no longer hosts home meets for Track and Field due to the expansion and addition of south end zone seats; however, the university continues to maintain the track for training purposes.

== See also ==
- List of NCAA Division I FBS football stadiums
