= NFL tackles leaders =

NFL tackles leaders may refer to:

- List of NFL annual tackles leaders
- List of NFL career tackles leaders
