= Ray Lewis =

American football player (born 1975)

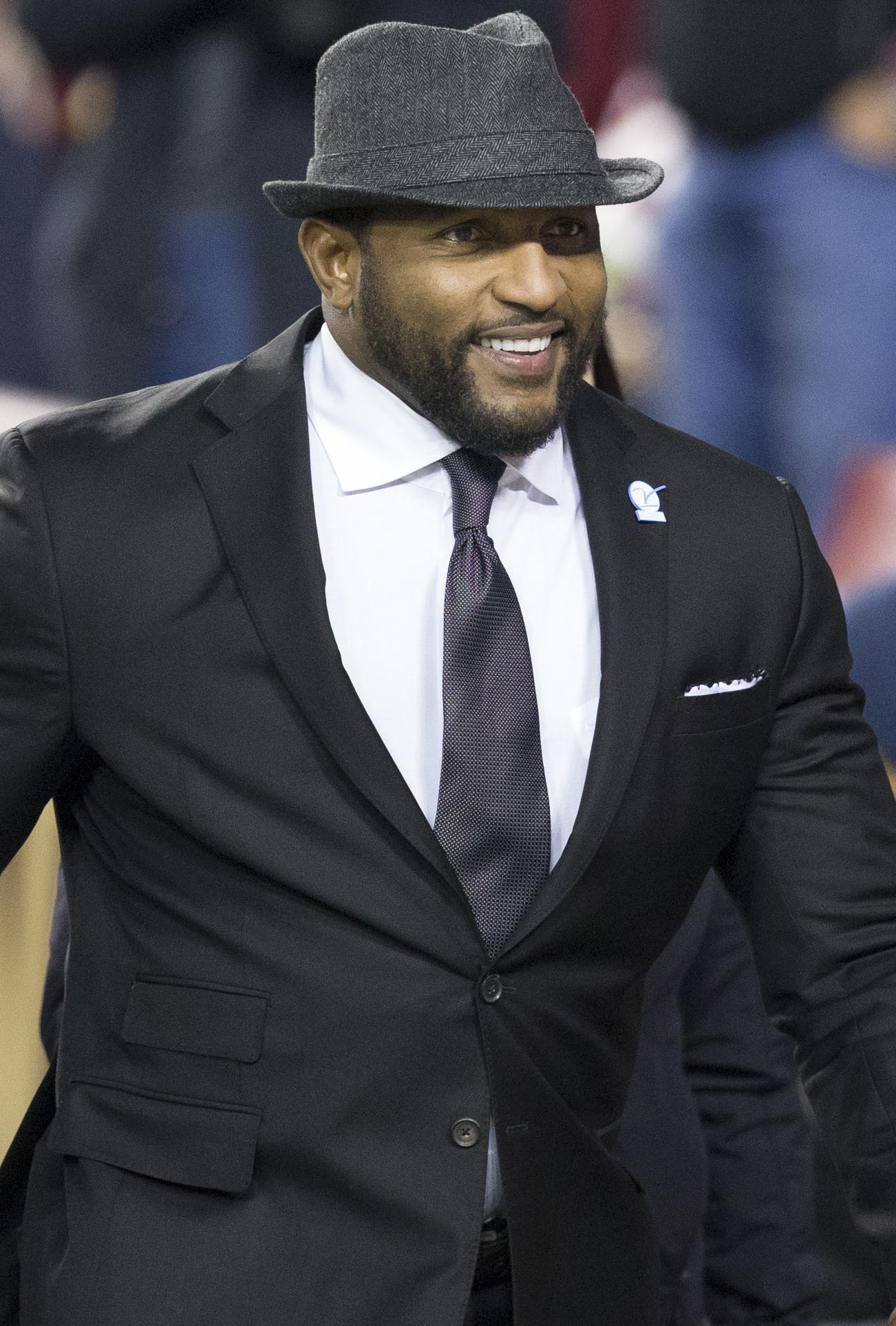
- Lewis in 2015

No. 52
- Position: Linebacker

Personal information
- Born: May 15, 1975 (age 51); Bartow, Florida, U.S.
- Listed height: 6 ft 1 in (1.85 m)
- Listed weight: 240 lb (109 kg)

Career information
- High school: Kathleen (Lakeland, Florida)
- College: Miami (FL) (1993–1995)
- NFL draft: 1996: 1st round, 26th overall pick

Career history
- Baltimore Ravens (1996–2012)

Awards and highlights
- 2× Super Bowl champion (XXXV, XLVII); Super Bowl MVP (XXXV); 2× NFL Defensive Player of the Year (2000, 2003); 7× First-team All-Pro (1999–2001, 2003, 2004, 2008, 2009); 3× Second-team All-Pro (1997, 1998, 2010); 13× Pro Bowl (1997–2001, 2003, 2004, 2006–2011); 3× NFL solo tackles leader (1997, 1999, 2001); 3× NFL combined tackles leader (1997, 1999, 2001); NFL 2000s All-Decade Team; NFL 100th Anniversary All-Time Team; Baltimore Ravens Ring of Honor; First-team All-American (1995); Third-team All-American (1994); NFL records: Most career combined tackles: 2,059; Most career solo tackles: 1,568; Most solo tackles in a season: 156 (1997); Most career postseason combined tackles: 218; Most career postseason solo tackles: 137

Career NFL statistics
- Total tackles: 2,059
- Sacks: 41.5
- Pass deflections: 67
- Interceptions: 31
- Forced fumbles: 17
- Fumble recoveries: 20
- Defensive touchdowns: 3
- Stats at Pro Football Reference
- Pro Football Hall of Fame

Other information
- Lewis's voice Lewis speaks about mental health in children. Recorded March 18, 2026

Raymond Anthony Lewis Jr. (born May 15, 1975) is an American former professional football linebacker who played in the National Football League (NFL) for 17 seasons with the Baltimore Ravens. He played college football for the Miami Hurricanes, earning All-America honors. He is considered one of the greatest linebackers of all time.

Lewis was selected by the Ravens in the first round of the 1996 NFL draft, and upon his retirement following the 2012 season, was the last remaining active player from the team's inaugural season. Lewis immediately became a leader on defense and led the team in tackles as a rookie, the first of 14 times he led the Ravens in tackles.

In 2000, Lewis pleaded guilty to obstruction of justice in connection with the stabbing deaths of two men; he testified as a key witness at the trial, and a jury determined the killings were acts of self-defense. The following season, he was named NFL Defensive Player of the Year and led the Ravens' record-setting defense, which established a 16-game single-season record for the fewest points allowed (165) and the fewest rushing yards allowed (970), to victory in Super Bowl XXXV. Lewis also became the second linebacker to win the Super Bowl Most Valuable Player Award, and the first to win the award on the winning Super Bowl team. (Note: Chuck Howley of the Dallas Cowboys was the first to win the award, doing so in Super Bowl V despite his team losing. He is the only player to win the award on the losing team.) Lewis won his second Defensive Player of the Year award in 2003, becoming the sixth player to win the award multiple times. After a triceps tear that sidelined him for most of the 2012 regular season, Lewis returned for the Ravens' playoff run and earned his second Super Bowl victory in his final NFL game. On February 3, 2018, the fifth anniversary of his final game, Lewis was selected to the Pro Football Hall of Fame in his first year of eligibility.

During his tenure with the Ravens, he accumulated 2,059 career combined tackles, including 1,568 solo tackles, both of which are NFL records. Due to his numerous accolades and prodigious football play, Lewis is widely considered to be the greatest middle linebacker in NFL history. He was a 13-time Pro Bowler, a 10-time All-Pro, and one of the few players in NFL history to play in a Pro Bowl in three decades (1990s, 2000s, and 2010s). He is also considered to be the greatest Baltimore Raven of all time, as well as one of the greatest defensive players of all time.

== Early life ==
Raymond Anthony Jackson was born in Bartow, Florida, located in Central Florida, the oldest of five siblings. His mother, Sunseria Smith, was just 15 at the time of his birth, while his father, Elbert Ray Jackson, was absent for most of his life. Not much was known about his father's life other that he was a record-setting high school wrestler before he was incarcerated for drug-related offenses. As a boy, and the eventual older brother to four younger siblings, Lewis quickly became the man of the house. He helped his sisters with their hair and made sure his younger brother arrived at daycare on time. When his father's contact became less frequent, he abandoned his last name and changed it to the last name of his mother's friend, Ray Lewis.

Lewis attended Kathleen High School in Lakeland, Florida, where he was a star high school football player and wrestler. As a wrestler, Lewis was a Florida wrestling state champion. He was an All-American linebacker on the football field at Kathleen, overcoming his smaller size at the time with his intensity and instincts. Lewis later revealed that his stepfather was extremely abusive towards his mother, and got a deck of 52 playing cards to start his push-up regimen, so he could get stronger to protect her. This also was the reason behind choosing the #52 jersey in his professional career. His younger brother, Keon Lattimore, was a former running back at the University of Maryland.

== College career ==
Lewis enrolled in the University of Miami, where he was a member of the Miami Hurricanes football team. As a freshman, he was an immediate contributor and became a starter for the Hurricanes' final five games. He compiled 81 tackles, two sacks, two tackles for loss, and four pass deflections en route to being named to the freshman All-American team.

In his sophomore season, Lewis earned first-team All-American and All-Big East honors. Lewis led the Big East with 153 tackles and also contributed nine tackles for a loss, two sacks, and an interception for a Hurricanes team that had the nation's top-ranked defense and finished No. 6 in both the writers' and coaches' polls.

Lewis's junior campaign was even more successful, as he was again named to the All-American and All-Big East teams, and finished as runner-up for the Butkus Award, given to the top linebacker in college football. Lewis finished his junior season with 160 tackles, the second highest in University of Miami team history after Ed Weisacosky's 164 in 1965.

Lewis led the Big East in tackles his last two seasons and accumulated the fifth most in Miami history despite playing only three seasons.

After the 1995 season, Lewis decided to forgo his final year of college eligibility and enter the NFL draft. The Baltimore Ravens, who were entering their inaugural season, selected Lewis 26th overall in the first round of the 1996 NFL draft. Lewis was the Ravens' second ever draft pick behind offensive tackle Jonathan Ogden who was selected #4 overall the same year. Lewis eventually earned his undergraduate degree in Arts and Science in 2004 at the University of Maryland University College.

== Professional career ==
Pre-draft measurables
Height	Weight	Arm length	Hand span	40-yard dash
6 ft 0 3/8 in (1.84 m)	235 lb (107 kg)	34 1/8 in (0.87 m)	9 3/8 in (0.24 m)	4.58 s
All values from NFL Combine/Pro Day

=== 1996 season: Rookie season ===
Lewis was the top-rated inside linebacker heading into the 1996 NFL Draft, in which Kevin Hardy was considered the draft's only outstanding linebacker prospect. Taken as the fifth linebacker in the draft, Lewis was seen by scouts as possessing speed, tackling ability, and intensity, as well as being praised for his ability to go into pass coverage. But many considered his lack of size a potential liability. In his first career game, a Week 1 19–14 victory over the Oakland Raiders, Lewis earned AFC Defensive Player of the Week for his seven-tackle performance, along with an unusual interception. Lewis earned USA Today's All-Rookie team honors after his 15 tackles for loss led the NFL and 110 tackles led the Ravens in the 1996 season. He finished his rookie season with two and a half sacks, six pass deflections, and an interception on the season as the Ravens finished with a 4–12 record.

=== 1997 season ===
In Week 9, against the Washington Redskins, Lewis earned his second AFC Defensive Player of the Week honor. Lewis recorded an NFL-best and career high 184 tackles in 1997, which also included 156 solo tackles, the most ever in single season, and earned his first Pro Bowl berth at the end of that season. In addition, Lewis totaled four sacks, an interception, a forced fumble, a fumble recovery, and 11 pass deflections in the Ravens' 6–9–1 season.

=== 1998 season ===
In Week 12 of the 1998 season, Lewis recorded two interceptions and a sack against the Bengals in a 20–13 win. Lewis made his second trip to the Pro Bowl after recording 120 tackles, three sacks, two interceptions, a forced fumble, and seven pass deflections. He led the 6–10 Ravens in tackles for the third consecutive season. He was also named to The Sporting News All-Pro Team. In what would prove to be Hall of Fame Detroit Lions running back Barry Sanders's final game, Lewis and the rest of the Ravens defense held him to just 41 rushing yards on 19 attempts.

=== 1999 season ===
In 1999, during the first game of the regular season against the St. Louis Rams, Lewis had 14 solo tackles, four tackles for loss, an interception, and a sack in the 27–10 loss. In Week 2 against the Pittsburgh Steelers, he finished with a team leading 13 combined tackles in the 23–20 loss. In Week 3 against the Cleveland Browns, Lewis had ten combined tackles and a sack in the 17–10 win. In Week 4 against the Atlanta Falcons, Lewis finished with 12 combined tackles in the 19–13 overtime win. During Week 5 against the Tennessee Titans, Lewis had 13 tackles and the only scored safety of his career in the 14–11 loss. In Week 8 against the Buffalo Bills, Lewis had 14 tackles and a sack in the 13–10 loss. Despite the Ravens having an 8–8 regular season record, Lewis led the NFL in tackles with 165. He was named to a third-straight Pro Bowl and the All-Pro first team. In addition, he totaled three and a half sacks, three interceptions, eight pass deflections, a safety, and a forced fumble. Lewis won the 1999 NFL Alumni Linebacker Of The Year chosen by past NFL players voting according to the position they played.

=== 2000: Record-setting defense, Defensive Player of the Year and Super Bowl XXXV MVP ===
In 2000, Lewis led a defense which many call the greatest in NFL history for a single season. In Week 2 of the regular season against the Jacksonville Jaguars, Lewis led the team in tackles with 11 tackles in the 39–36 win. In Week 3 against the Miami Dolphins, Lewis had 11 tackles in the 19–6 loss. In Week 6 against the Jacksonville Jaguars, he finished 13 tackles and a fumble recovery in the 15–10 win. In Week 13 against the Cleveland Browns, Lewis had five tackles and two sacks in the 44–7 blowout win. Lewis finished the regular season with a franchise leading 137 tackles, as well as two interceptions, six pass deflections, and three fumble recoveries. The team set a 16-game single-season record for fewest points allowed (165) and fewest rushing yards allowed (970). The team recorded four shutouts, one shy of the single-season record. The unit finished first league-wide in six key defensive categories. Including the postseason, and excluding three combined touchdowns that were given up by the Ravens offense and special teams, Baltimore's defense allowed only 184 points in 20 games. After the regular season, he earned a unanimous All-Pro selection, and was once again named to start in the Pro Bowl. In the Wild Card Round against the Denver Broncos, Lewis had seven tackles and an interception in the 21–3 win. In the Divisional Round against the Tennessee Titans, Lewis had 12 combined tackles and an interception returned 50 yards for the clinching touchdown in the 24–10 win. In the AFC Championship against the Oakland Raiders, he had seven combined tackles and a fumble recovery in the 16–3 win. Lewis was named NFL Defensive Player of The Year for the 2000 season. The Ravens became only the second team to ever record a defensive shutout in a Super Bowl, as they dominated the New York Giants 34–7 to win the franchise's first ever Super Bowl championship. Lewis's five combined tackles and four passes defended earned him Super Bowl XXXV MVP honors. He also added 31 tackles, two interceptions, 9 pass deflections, one fumble recovery, and a touchdown in the four-game playoff run.

=== 2001 season ===
In 2001, Lewis earned his fifth consecutive Pro Bowl selection, when he led the NFL in tackles with 162 and earned first-team All-Pro honors. In Week 12, he had a career-high 18 total tackles and one sack in the 39–27 victory over the Colts. In Week 15, he earned his third AFC Defensive Player of the Week honor in a 15–0 shutout of the Cincinnati Bengals. He had two interceptions and 11 total tackles in the win. The Ravens earned a playoff berth with a 10–6 record. In the Ravens' two playoff games, he totaled 17 tackles, three forced fumbles, and one pass deflection as the team's season ended in the divisional round.

=== 2002 season ===
In 2002, Lewis was limited to only five games due to a shoulder injury. He still managed to rank fifth on the team with 58 tackles. In addition, Lewis compiled two interceptions, two pass deflections, a forced fumble and a fumble recovery. Lewis earned AFC Defensive Player of the Week honors in Week 4 against the Denver Broncos after posting and tying his career-high with 18 tackles (11 solo), two pass deflections, and an interception. After having been selected to the Pro Bowl for five consecutive seasons (1997–2001), Lewis's streak was stopped by his season-ending injury. In his absence, the Baltimore Ravens defense finished ranked 19th in points allowed the team as a whole finished with a 7–9 record.

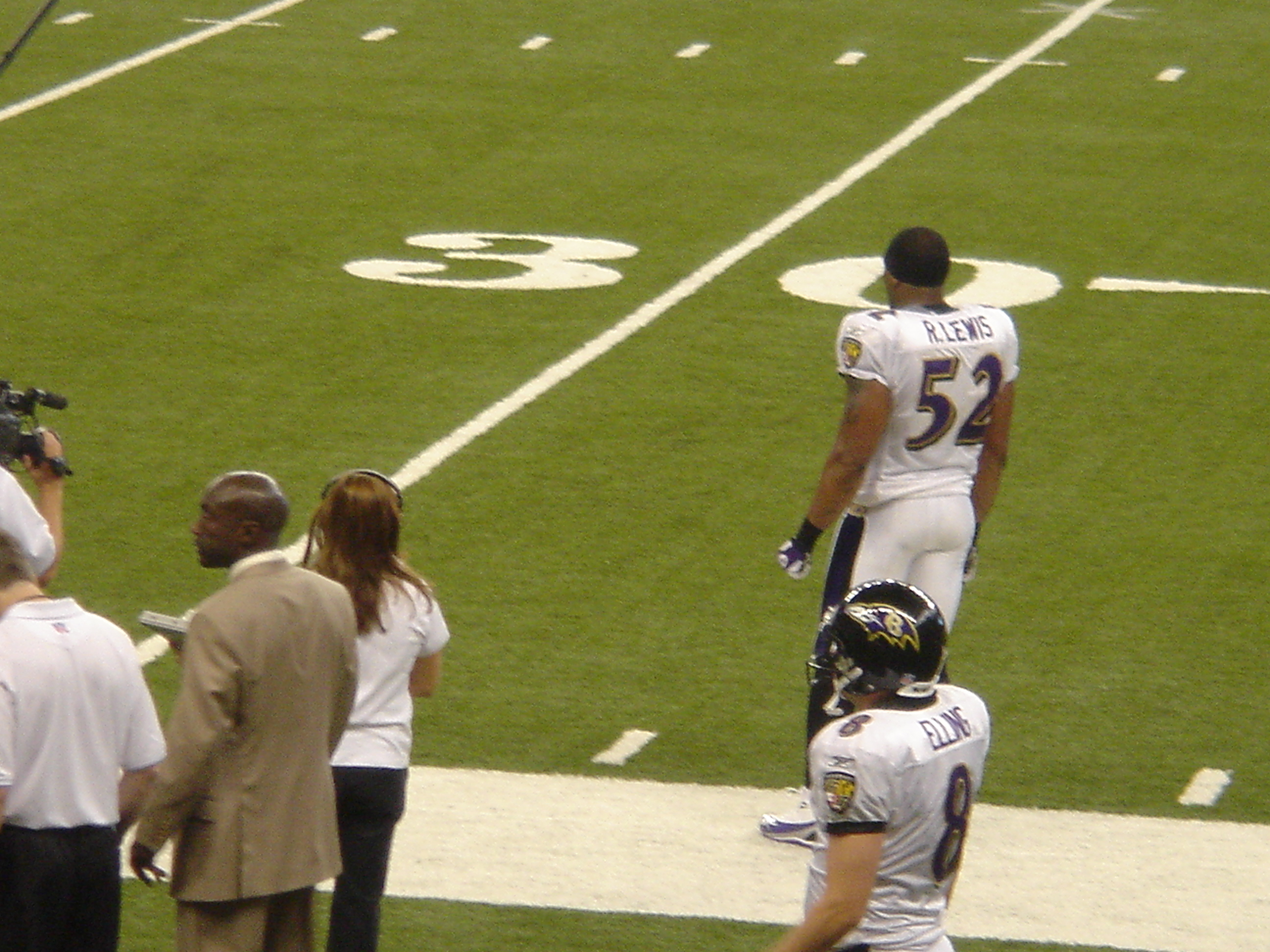
Lewis on the sidelines with the Baltimore Ravens, 2005

=== 2003 season: Second Defensive Player of the Year award ===
Lewis was the leading vote recipient for the 2003 AP All-Pro team, earning 49 of 50 votes. He also won the annual AP NFL Defensive Player of the Year with 43 votes out of 50. He was named to his sixth career Pro Bowl for the 2003 season. Additionally, Lewis earned Pro Football Weekly, PFWA, and Football Digest Defensive MVP honors and was named to Dr. Z's Sports Illustrated All-Pro team, Pro Football Weekly's All-NFL team, Pro Football Weekly's All-AFC team, Football Digest's All-Pro first team, and The Sporting News' All-Pro team. Lewis also earned the KC 101 AFC Defensive Player of the Year award for the 3rd time in four years, the 2003 NFL Alumni Linebacker Of The Year, and finished with 161 tackles, one and a half sacks, six interceptions, two forced fumbles, two fumble recoveries, 14 pass deflections, and one touchdown. He was named NFL Defensive Player of the Month for November and AFC Defensive Player of the Week for his 15-tackle, one-interception performance against the Pittsburgh Steelers in week 17. In the Wild Card Round loss to the Tennessee Titans, Lewis totaled 17 tackles.

=== 2004 season ===
In 2004, Lewis was named first-team All-Pro by the AP, second-team "All Pro" by College and Pro Football Weekly and Football Digest, and "All Pro" by The Sporting News. He finished the 2004 season playing 15 games while recording 146 total tackles, one sack, two fumble recoveries, one fumble forced, and six pass deflections as the Ravens went 9–7. He earned a seventh Pro Bowl nomination.

=== 2005 season ===
Lewis's 2005 season was cut short by an injury in Week 6. He was placed on injured reserve in Week 8, having amassed 46 tackles, a sack, an interception, two pass deflections, and a fumble recovery in the season's first six games. The Ravens struggled to a final record of 6–10.

=== 2006 season ===
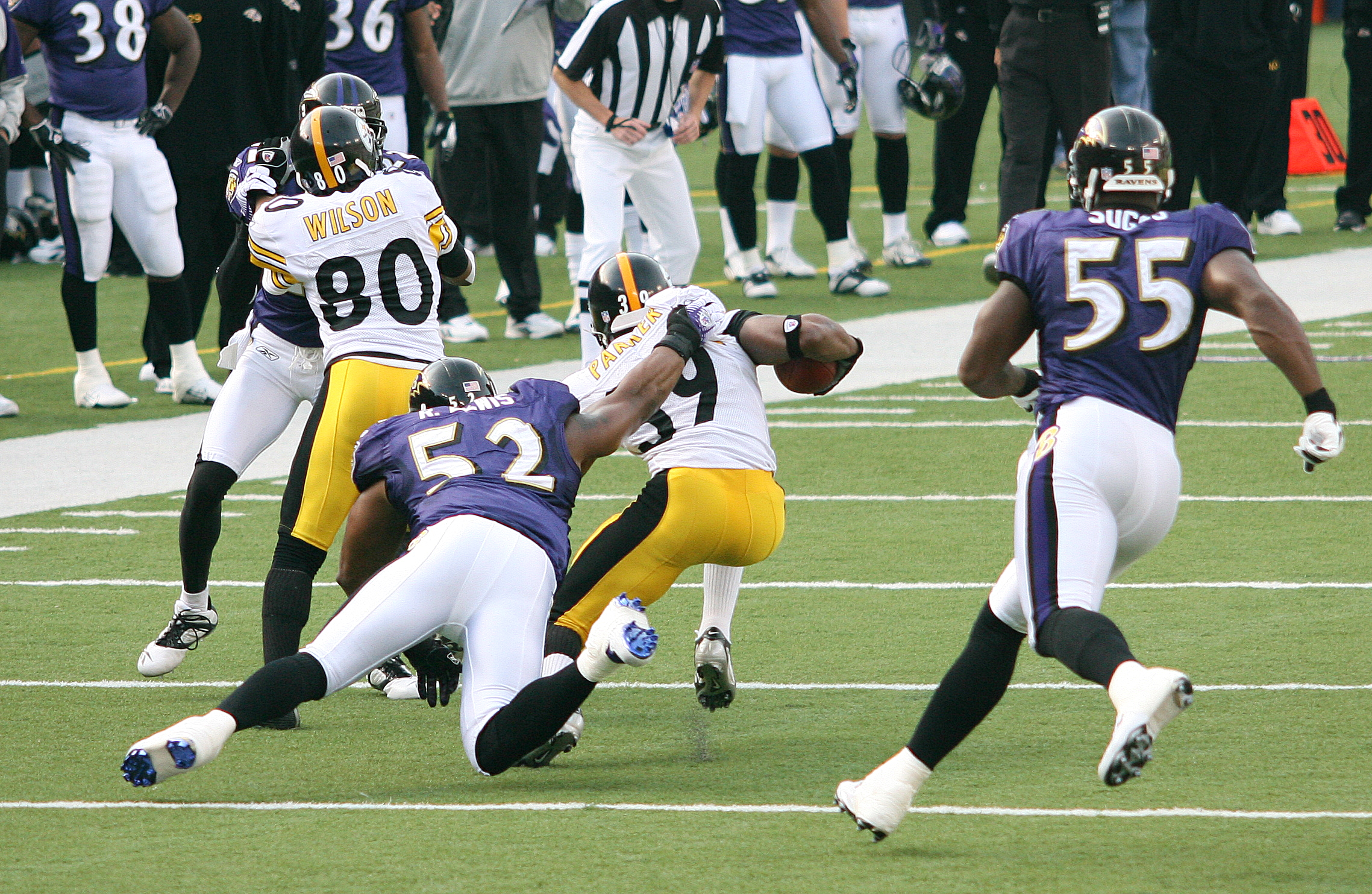
Lewis (#52) brings down Willie Parker in a game against the Pittsburgh Steelers, 2006

In 2006, Lewis led the Ravens defense to an NFL-best ranking in 14 major defensive categories, including total yards allowed, points per game allowed, and interceptions. The Ravens also finished second in sacks, take-aways, and rushing yards allowed. Lewis missed two games due to an injury, but still recorded 103 tackles, a personal best of five sacks, two interceptions, and eight pass deflections in 14 games. He also forced a fumble and recovered one. The Ravens allowed just one 100-yard rushing performance in the 14 games Lewis played. Lewis was named AFC Defensive Player of the Week following his seven-tackle, one-sack, and three-pass-deflection performance against the Tampa Bay Buccaneers in the season opener. He was also selected to the Pro Bowl, but withdrew because of a hand injury, ceding his spot to fellow Ravens linebacker Bart Scott. Lewis finished fifth in voting for Defensive Player of the Year. Lewis totaled 15 tackles and a pass deflection in the Divisional Round loss to the Indianapolis Colts.

=== 2007 season ===
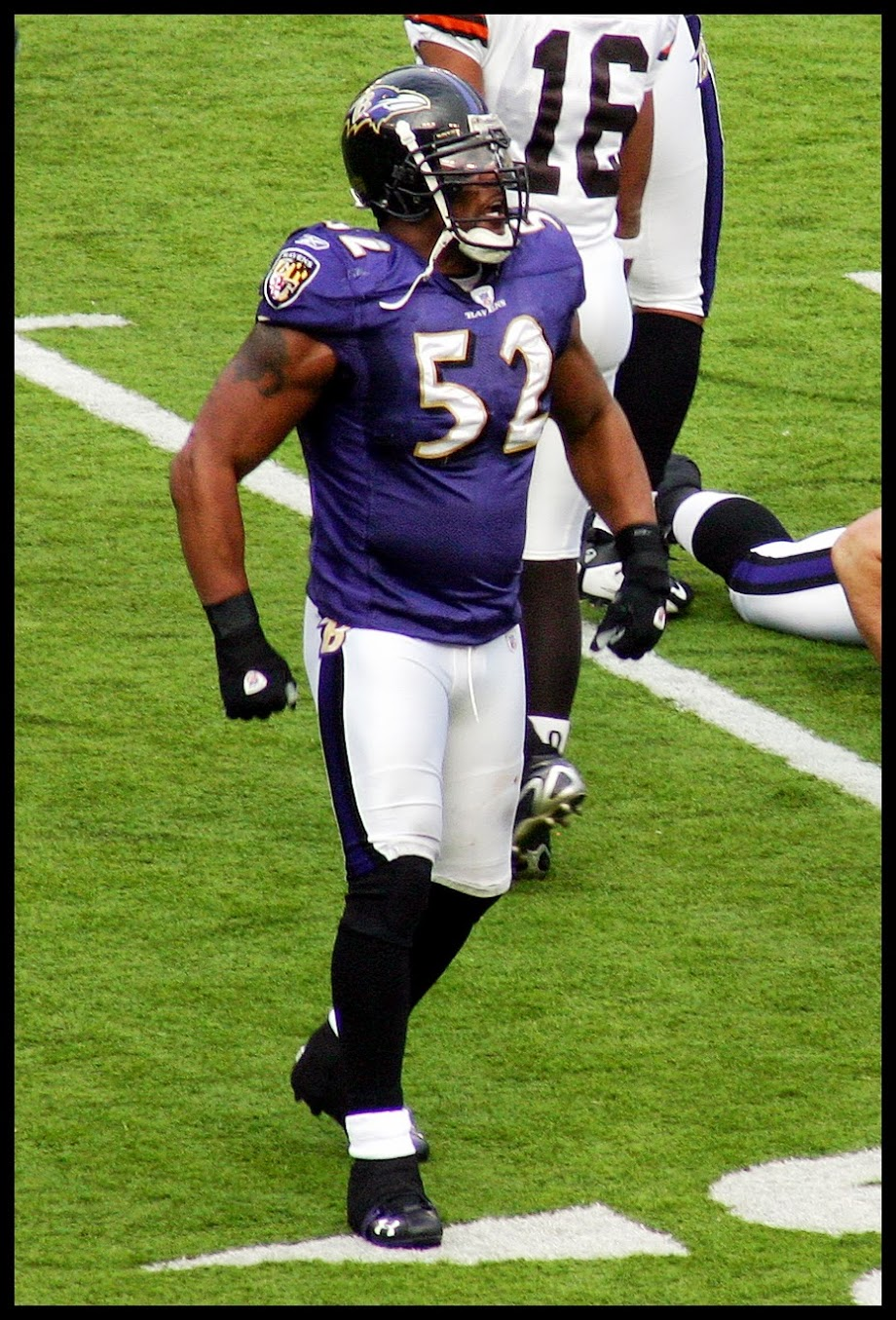
Lewis with the Baltimore Ravens, 2007

Despite the Ravens' mediocre 5–11 season, Lewis was the team's leading tackler. Against the Cleveland Browns, Lewis recorded 16 tackles, recovered a fumble, and returned an interception for a touchdown. He earned his ninth career Pro Bowl nomination. He finished the season with 120 total tackles, two sacks, two forced fumbles, one fumble recovery, ten passes deflected, two interceptions, and one touchdown.

=== 2008 season ===
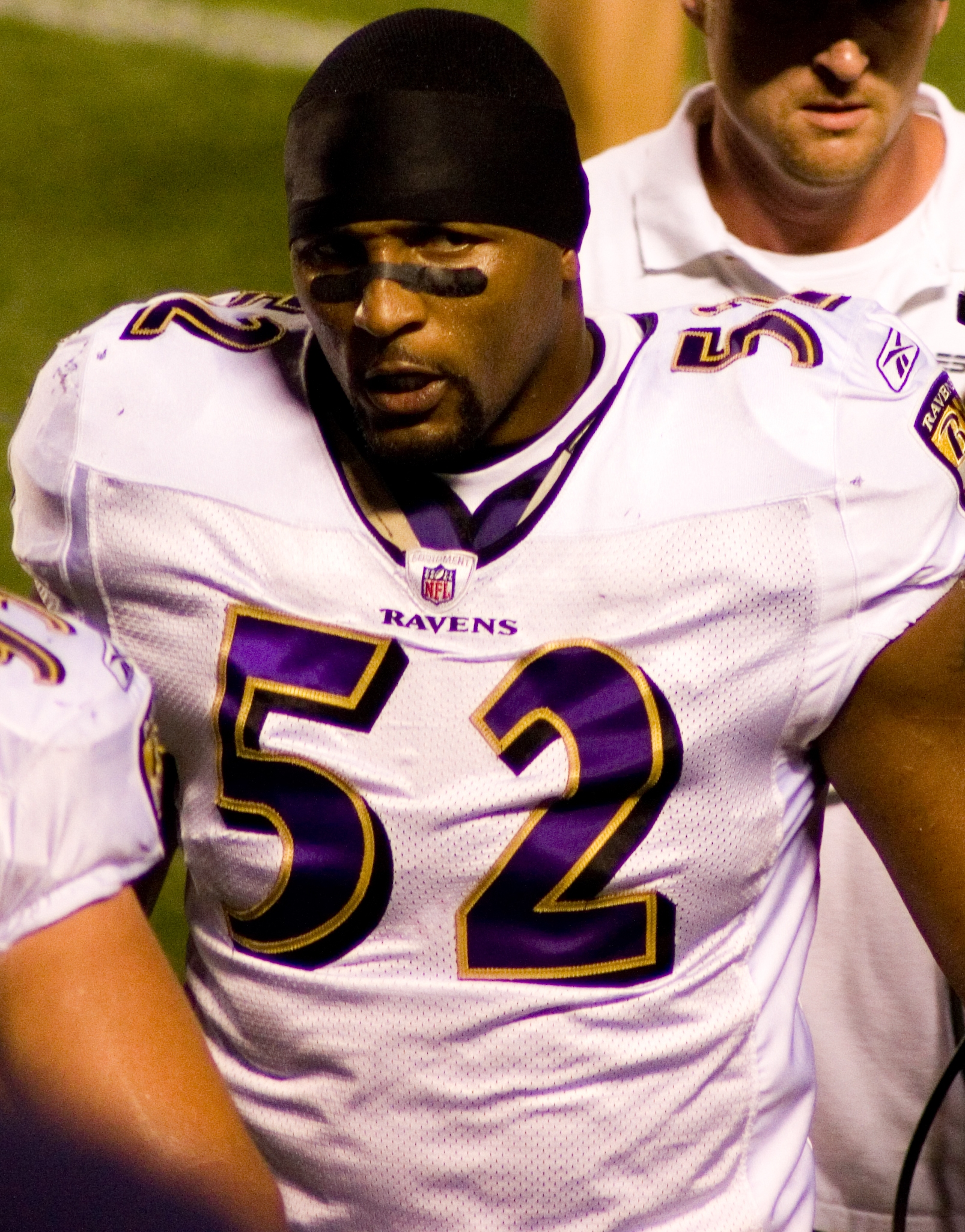
Lewis with the Ravens facing the Pittsburgh Steelers, 2008

In 2008, Lewis helped lead the Ravens to the AFC Championship while totaling 117 tackles, three and a half sacks, three interceptions, two forced fumbles, two fumble recoveries, and nine passes deflected. He was named a starter to the Pro Bowl, his tenth such nomination, and was named an Associated Press first-team All-Pro for the sixth time. In addition, he was named the AFC Defensive Player of the Week following his eight tackles, two interception, and two pass deflections against the Houston Texans in Week 10. In the three playoff games against the Miami Dolphins, Tennessee Titans, and Pittsburgh Steelers, Lewis totaled 29 tackles, two forced fumbles, and one pass deflection in three games. After the season, he became an unrestricted free agent, but agreed to return to the Baltimore Ravens to complete his career. The contract, which would have run through 2015 (including two option years), was said to be worth $10 million the first year, but was highly incentivized.

=== 2009 season ===
In 2009, Lewis was named first-team All-Pro by the Associated Press for the seventh time (ninth selection overall) and named to his 11th Pro Bowl. He accumulated an AFC-leading 134 tackles on the season. He also added three sacks, two forced fumbles, one fumble recovery, and seven passes deflected. Lewis added 21 tackles, one sack, and one pass deflection in two playoff games. In the September 2009 issue of Sporting News' Magazine, Lewis was selected to their Team of the Decade (2000s). In Week 2 against the San Diego Chargers, Lewis made the game-saving tackle on running back Darren Sproles on a fourth-down play. After the game, Lewis said it was one of the best tackles he has made in his career. Lewis was named to the Pro Football Hall of Fame 1st team All-2000s Team.

=== 2010 season ===
In 2010, Lewis was named second-team All-Pro by the Associated Press for the third time (10th All-Pro selection overall) and named to his 12th Pro Bowl. He totaled 139 tackles, two sacks, two interceptions, two forced fumbles, three fumble recoveries, four pass deflections, and one defensive touchdown, which came on a 24-yard pick six against the Panthers in Week 11. Lewis added 13 tackles, one sack, and a forced fumble in two playoff games. On Sunday, November 21, 2010, Lewis became only the second player in NFL history to record at least 30 interceptions and 30 sacks for their career. He was the fastest player (204 games) to achieve that feat. He was ranked fourth by his fellow players on the NFL Top 100 Players of 2011. He earned the highest ranking for a defensive player on the initial ranking by the NFL players.

=== 2011 season ===
In Week 3, Lewis was named AFC Defensive Player of the Week for his performance against the St. Louis Rams. In the 37–7 victory, Lewis had one sack, one forced fumble, and ten solo tackles. In the 2011 season, Lewis was named to his 13th and what proved to be his final Pro Bowl, and led the Ravens with 95 tackles despite missing four games with an injury. Lewis also collected two sacks, one interception, two forced fumbles, and seven pass deflections. Lewis totaled 20 tackles and one pass deflection in two playoff games. On Sunday, October 16, 2011, against the Houston Texans, Lewis became the first player in NFL history with at least 40 sacks and 30 interceptions in his career. He was ranked 20th by his fellow players on the NFL Top 100 Players of 2012.

=== 2012: Final year and second Super Bowl ===
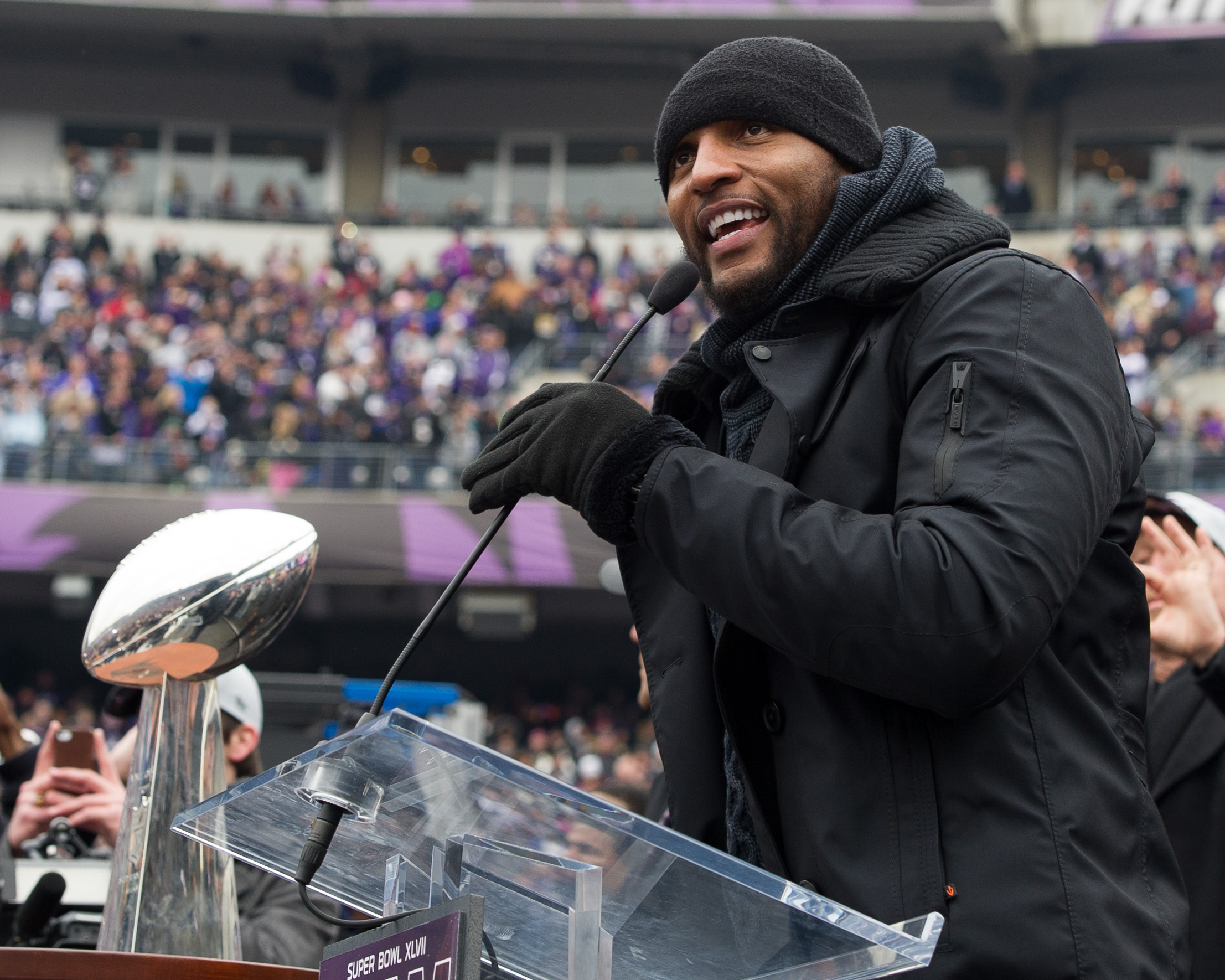
Lewis at a post-Super Bowl XLVII celebration at M&T Bank Stadium, February 2013

Lewis suffered torn triceps on October 14, 2012, during a game against the Dallas Cowboys, and had them surgically repaired three days later. Several sources had reported he was expected to return to action December 16 in the game against the Denver Broncos, much earlier than his expected return in January, but he was inactive for the game. On January 2, 2013, Lewis announced he would retire after his team finished the 2012–13 NFL playoffs.

He returned to action for Baltimore's Wild Card Round game against the Colts and led the defense to a 24–9 win. On the game's last play, Lewis lined up on offense at fullback. The Ravens were not slated to play another home playoff game (since they were the number-four seed, and the day before, the Houston Texans beat the number-six seed Cincinnati Bengals), so they wanted Lewis to be on the field for the final play. Next, the Ravens defeated the Denver Broncos in the Divisional Round, 38–35 in double overtime, and then defeated the New England Patriots in the AFC Championship, 28–13. Lewis's final career NFL game was Super Bowl XLVII, where the Ravens defeated the San Francisco 49ers by a score of 34–31. Lewis finished the regular season with 57 tackles, one sack, one forced fumble, one fumble recovery, and one deflection in six games. In the postseason, Lewis led the NFL with 51 tackles. He contributed two tackles for loss and one pass deflection in the Ravens' Super Bowl XLVII run.

== NFL career statistics ==
Legend
	NFL Defensive Player of the Year
	Super Bowl MVP
	Won the Super Bowl
	Led the league
	NFL record
**Bold**	Career high

=== Regular season ===
Year	Team	Games		Tackles						Interceptions				Fumbles	
Year	Team	GP	GS	Cmb	Solo	Ast	Sck	SckY	Sfty	Int	Yds	TD	PD	FF	FR
1996	BAL	14	13	110	95	15	2.5	9	0	1	0	0	5	0	0
1997	BAL	16	16	**184**	**156**	28	4.0	27	0	1	18	0	10	1	1
1998	BAL	14	14	120	101	19	3.0	14	0	2	25	0	7	1	0
1999	BAL	16	16	165	130	35	3.5	21	**1**	3	97	0	8	0	0
2000	BAL	16	16	137	108	29	3.0	33	0	2	1	0	6	0	**3**
2001	BAL	16	16	162	114	**48**	3.5	26	0	3	**115**	0	10	1	1
2002	BAL	5	5	58	43	15	0.0	0	0	2	4	0	3	1	1
2003	BAL	16	16	163	121	42	1.5	11	0	**6**	99	**1**	**14**	**2**	2
2004	BAL	15	15	147	101	46	1.0	9	0	0	0	0	6	1	2
2005	BAL	6	6	46	38	8	1.0	1	0	1	0	0	2	0	1
2006	BAL	14	14	103	80	23	**5.0**	**37**	0	2	27	0	8	1	1
2007	BAL	14	14	121	83	38	2.0	7	0	2	35	**1**	10	**2**	1
2008	BAL	16	16	118	85	33	3.5	33	0	3	43	0	9	**2**	2
2009	BAL	16	16	134	95	39	3.0	16	0	0	9	0	7	**2**	1
2010	BAL	16	16	139	102	37	2.0	8	0	2	26	**1**	4	**2**	**3**
2011	BAL	12	12	95	72	23	2.0	16	0	1	4	0	7	**2**	0
2012	BAL	6	6	57	44	13	1.0	0	0	0	0	0	1	1	1
Career		228	227	2,059	1,568	491	41.5	266	1	31	503	3	117	19	20

=== Playoffs ===
Year	Team	Games		Tackles						Interceptions				Fumbles	
Year	Team	GP	GS	Cmb	Solo	Ast	Sck	SckY	Sfty	Int	Yds	TD	PD	FF	FR
2000	BAL	4	4	31	21	10	0.0	0	0	**2**	**54**	**1**	**9**	0	**1**
2001	BAL	2	2	17	10	7	0.0	0	0	0	0	0	1	**3**	0
2003	BAL	1	1	17	11	6	0.0	0	0	0	0	0	0	0	0
2006	BAL	1	1	15	10	5	0.0	0	0	0	0	0	1	0	0
2008	BAL	3	3	29	23	6	0.0	0	0	0	0	0	1	2	0
2009	BAL	2	2	25	12	13	**1.0**	7	0	0	0	0	0	0	0
2010	BAL	2	2	13	9	4	**1.0**	**10**	0	0	0	0	0	1	0
2011	BAL	2	2	20	12	8	0.0	0	0	0	0	0	1	0	0
2012	BAL	4	4	**51**	**29**	**22**	0.0	0	0	0	0	0	1	0	0
Career		21	21	218	137	81	2.0	17	0	2	54	1	14	6	1

== Murder trial ==
Following a Super Bowl XXXIV party in Atlanta on January 31, 2000, a fight broke out between Lewis' entourage and another group of people, resulting in the stabbing deaths of Jacinth Baker and Richard Lollar. Lewis and two companions, Reginald Oakley and Joseph Sweeting, were questioned by Atlanta police, and 11 days later the three men were indicted on murder and aggravated assault charges. The fight occurred about 200 yards (180 m) from the Cobalt Lounge at 265 East Paces Ferry Road in the Buckhead Village neighborhood about two miles north of downtown Atlanta where Lewis had been celebrating. The white suit Lewis was wearing the night of the killings was never found. Fulton County District Attorney Paul Howard alleged the blood-stained suit was dumped in a garbage bin outside a fast food restaurant. A knife found at the scene did not have any fingerprints or DNA. Lewis subsequently testified that Oakley and Sweeting had bought knives earlier in the week before the Super Bowl from a Sports Authority where Lewis had been signing autographs. Baker's blood was found inside of Lewis's limousine.

Two weeks into the trial, Lewis's attorneys, Don Samuel and Ed Garland, negotiated a plea agreement with the District Attorney in which the murder charges against Lewis were dismissed in exchange for his testimony against Oakley and Sweeting, and his guilty plea to a misdemeanor charge of obstruction of justice. Lewis admitted he gave a misleading statement to police on the morning after the killings (initially telling them that he was not at the scene). Superior Court Judge Alice D. Bonner sentenced Lewis to 12 months' probation. One year in prison is the maximum sentence for a first-time offender, and the immediate probation was the judge's decision. He was also fined $250,000 by the NFL, which was believed to be the highest fine levied against an NFL player for an infraction not involving substance abuse. Under the terms of the sentence, Lewis could not use drugs or alcohol during the duration of the probation.

=== Outcome ===
Oakley and Sweeting maintained that they had acted in self-defense, and after five hours of deliberation, the jury acquitted them of all charges in June 2000. The following year, Lewis was named Super Bowl XXXV MVP. However, the signature phrase "I'm going to Disney World!" was given instead to quarterback Trent Dilfer.

On April 29, 2004, Lewis reached an out-of-court settlement with four-year-old India Lollar, born months after the death of her father Richard, pre-empting a scheduled civil proceeding. Lewis also reached an undisclosed settlement with Baker's family.

During a taped pre-game interview with Shannon Sharpe that aired on CBS before Super Bowl XLVII, Sharpe told Lewis that the families of the slain men find it difficult to see Lewis idolized by millions of fans, believing he knows more about the killings than he shared, and asked what he had to say to those families. Lewis responded, "God has never made a mistake. That's just who He is, you see.... To the family, if you knew, if you really knew the way God works, He don't use people who commits anything like that for His glory."

The Ravens' crisis management around Lewis's murder trial was revisited by former head coach Brian Billick, by then a media analyst, after the 2013 arrest of Aaron Hernandez and his swift release by the New England Patriots.

== Legacy ==
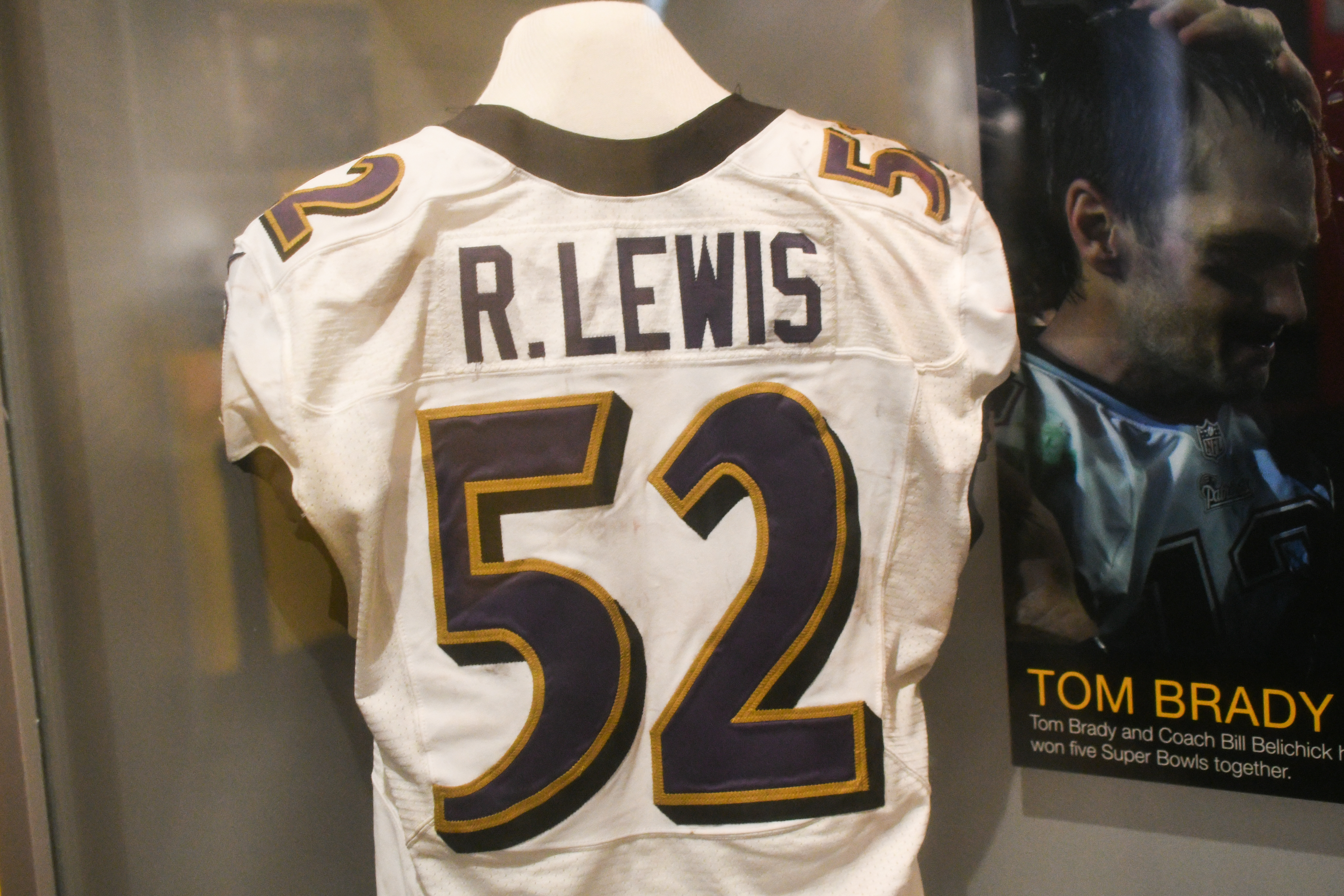
Lewis' jersey exhibited at the Pro Football Hall of Fame

Throughout his career, Lewis built a reputation as a leader and intimidating force at middle linebacker. He has led his team in tackles in 12 of his 14 seasons. The Ravens did not allow a single 100-yard rusher in 51 consecutive games from the 1998 through 2001 seasons. In addition to his run defense, Lewis has also gained a reputation as a complete defender. His 31 interceptions rank fifth all-time among NFL linebackers, and just six short of the top spot. Since the murder allegations, Lewis's image has recovered, and today he is considered one of the most dominant linebackers in the history of the NFL. Lewis was also selected as the third-best linebacker of all time on the show The Sports List. A poll of NFL coaches selected him as the most dominant player in the NFL before the 2003 season by being mentioned on 10 ballots, while no other player was mentioned more than twice. Team owner Steve Bisciotti stated his intention to erect a statue of Lewis outside M&T Bank Stadium. On September 4, 2014, days before the Ravens season opener, a statue of Lewis was unveiled in front of M&T Bank Stadium.

Lewis has been referenced in television shows such as The Wire, films such as The Rundown (by that movie's star and Lewis's friend & former teammate at Miami, Dwayne Johnson), and in music videos, such as in Mario's "Just a Friend 2002" and Nelly's "Heart of a Champion". Lewis has appeared in television ads for NFL Network, Reebok, Under Armour, Old Spice, and Eastern Motors. He was the featured athlete on the cover of Madden NFL 2005. That season, he missed a number of games to an injury, adding to the "Madden Curse". He was documented in NFL Network's documentary series A Football Life. He was named to the NFL 100 All Time Team.

== Other work ==
Lewis opened the Ray Lewis Full Moon Bar-B-Que, which operated in Baltimore's Canton neighborhood from February 2005 until 2008. He has also gained several national corporate endorsements, some of which draw upon his tough image. In 2004, Lewis was placed on the cover of the highly popular Madden NFL 2005 video game published by EA Sports, and is also a very avid player of the same series. In 2006, it was announced that Lewis, Hall of Fame running back Gale Sayers, and entrepreneur Mark Bloomquist would form S&L Racing, intending to race both cars and trucks from a North Carolina headquarters. Lewis's attempt to join NASCAR racing failed.

On March 13, 2013, it was announced that Lewis would join ESPN as a contributor for their NFL coverage. Lewis was let go by ESPN in 2016. On June 20, 2017, it was announced Lewis had been hired by cable sports network Fox Sports 1.

Lewis competed against tight end Tony Gonzalez in an episode of Spike (now Paramount Network)'s Lip Sync Battle, which aired on February 2, 2017. He emerged victorious with performances of Al Green's "Let's Stay Together" and "Hot in Herre" by Nelly, who joined him for the performance.

In August 2019, Lewis was announced as one of the celebrities to compete on season 28 of Dancing with the Stars. He later withdrew from the competition due to a tendon injury in his foot, requiring surgery.

== Charitable activities ==
Lewis has been heavily involved in charitable activities throughout his professional career. He started the Ray Lewis 52 Foundation which is a nonprofit corporation whose mission is to provide personal and economic assistance to disadvantaged youth. The foundation has funded such events as adopting 10 families in Baltimore community for the holidays, an annual celebrity auction and bowling tournament, the Great Maryland Duck Derby, Thanksgiving food drives on North Avenue in Baltimore, and Ray's Summer Days. All proceeds have helped fund the Ray Lewis Foundation.

Lewis has since been involved in pressing political, business, and philanthropic leaders for a stronger commitment to disability sports both here and in the developing world. Lewis was also honored with a JB award (named in honor of CBS broadcaster James Brown) during the 2006 off-season and received the "Act of Kindness" Award for his work in the community.

== Awards and accolades ==
Since his rookie year in 1996, Lewis has won numerous NFL awards, including being named Defensive Player of the Year twice (2000 and 2003), as well as Super Bowl MVP after winning Super Bowl XXXV after the 2000 season. He is also a 13-time Pro Bowler and seven-time AP First Team All-Pro player, a three-time AP Second Team All-Pro Selection, and was also a two-time All-American in college (1994 and 1995).

On May 11, 2010, a portion of Baltimore's North Avenue was renamed "Ray Lewis Way" in honor of the linebacker and his charitable work.

Lewis had career totals of 2,059 total tackles (1,568 solo), 19 forced fumbles, 117 passes defended, 102.5 stuffs for a loss, 41.5 sacks, 20 fumble recoveries, 31 interceptions for 503 yards, one safety, and three touchdowns in 228 games. He has been selected to 13 NFL Pro Bowl games, a record for an inside/middle linebacker, in his 17 seasons, and led the NFL in tackles five times (1997, 1999, 2001, 2003 and 2004). In 2003, Lewis led all linebackers with six interceptions, a total matching the post-merger all-time record for a middle linebacker in a single season. Lewis was named first-team Associated Press All-Pro in 1999, 2000, 2001, 2003, 2004, 2008, 2009 and second-team All-Pro in 1997, 1998, and 2010. His 10 total All-Pro selections is a record for an inside/middle linebacker and ties the record for a linebacker (Lawrence Taylor also has 10 selections). In 21 career playoff games, Lewis has totaled 214 tackles (135 solo), two sacks, six forced fumbles, one fumble recovery, two interceptions for 54 yards, 15 pass deflections, 10.5 stuffs for a loss, and one touchdown.

Lewis was voted into the Pro Football Hall of Fame in 2018, his first year of eligibility. Lewis joined teammate Jonathan Ogden in Canton; the two were the Ravens' first two draft picks after the team relocated to Baltimore. In 2025, Lewis was inducted into the National High School Football Hall of Fame.

== Personal life ==
Lewis is a Christian, and his commitment to his faith was featured in a Sports Illustrated cover story in 2006. He has six children: four boys, and two girls.

His son Ray Lewis III played college football at Miami, Coastal Carolina, and Virginia Union. He played indoor football for the Wyoming Mustangs in 2021. Ray III died at the age of 28 on June 15, 2023, of an accidental overdose. He was posthumously diagnosed with CTE. His parents stated he had symptoms prior to his death and voiced support for research into the disease.

Lewis’s son Rayshad played at Utah State, Maryland, and Kentucky. His son Rahsaan played for Central Florida, Florida Atlantic, and Kentucky.

Michael Phelps, a Baltimore native and Ravens fan, stated that he found his life purpose and desire to compete in the 2016 Summer Olympics after seeking Lewis's advice.

Lewis is a fan of English soccer club Manchester City FC. In 2015, Lewis' autobiography, I Feel Like Going On: Life, Game, and Glory, was published.
