= 2024 NFL season =

American football season

Regular season
- Duration: September 5, 2024 – January 5, 2025

Playoffs
- Start date: January 11, 2025
- AFC Champions: Kansas City Chiefs
- NFC Champions: Philadelphia Eagles

Super Bowl LIX
- Date: February 9, 2025
- Site: Caesars Superdome, New Orleans, Louisiana
- Champions: Philadelphia Eagles

Pro Bowl
- Date: February 2, 2025
- Site: Camping World Stadium, Orlando, Florida

AFC teams: West, North, South, East
NFC teams: West, North, South, East

The 2024 NFL season was the 105th season of the National Football League (NFL). The season began on September 5, 2024, with reigning Super Bowl champion Kansas City defeating Baltimore in the NFL Kickoff Game. The regular season concluded on January 5, 2025. The playoffs started on January 11 and concluded with Philadelphia defeating Kansas City in Super Bowl LIX, the league's championship game, at the Caesars Superdome in New Orleans, Louisiana, on February 9.

== Player movement ==
The 2024 NFL league year and trading period started on March 13. On March 11, teams were allowed to exercise options for 2024 on players with option clauses in their contracts, submit qualifying offers to their pending restricted free agents, and submit a Minimum Salary Tender to retain exclusive negotiating rights to their players with expiring 2023 contracts and fewer than three accrued seasons of free agent credit. Teams were required to be under the salary cap using the "top 51" definition (in which the 51 highest paid-players on the team's payroll must have a combined salary cap). On March 13, clubs were allowed to contact and begin contract negotiations with players whose contracts had expired and thus became unrestricted free agents.

This season's salary cap increased to $255.4 million per team, up from the previous high of $224.8 million in 2023.

Positions key
Offense	Defense	Special teams
QB — Quarterback; RB — Running back; FB — Fullback; WR — Wide receiver; TE — Tight end; OL — Offensive lineman; T — Tackle; G — Guard; C — Center	DL — Defensive lineman; DT — Defensive tackle (Note: Includes nose tackle (NT)); DE — Defensive end; EDGE — Edge rusher; LB — Linebacker (Note: Includes middle linebacker (MLB/MIKE), weakside linebacker (WILL), strongside linebacker (SAM), off-ball linebacker, and outside linebacker (OLB)); DB — Defensive back; CB — Cornerback; S — Safety (Note: Includes free safety (FS) and strong safety (SS))	K — Kicker (Note: Also known as a placekicker (PK)); P — Punter; LS — Long snapper; RS — Return specialist (Note: Includes kickoff and punt returners)

=== Free agency ===
Free agency began on March 13, 2024. Notable players to change teams included:

- Quarterbacks Jacoby Brissett (Washington to New England), Kirk Cousins (Minnesota to Atlanta), Gardner Minshew (Indianapolis to Las Vegas), and Russell Wilson (Denver to Pittsburgh).
- Running backs Saquon Barkley (New York Giants to Philadelphia), Austin Ekeler (Los Angeles Chargers to Washington), Ezekiel Elliott (New England to Dallas), Derrick Henry (Tennessee to Baltimore), Josh Jacobs (Las Vegas to Green Bay), Aaron Jones (Green Bay to Minnesota), Zack Moss (Indianapolis to Cincinnati), Tony Pollard (Dallas to Tennessee), Devin Singletary (Houston to New York Giants), and D'Andre Swift (Philadelphia to Chicago)
- Wide receivers Odell Beckham Jr. (Baltimore to Miami), Marquise Brown (Arizona to Kansas City), Gabe Davis (Buffalo to Jacksonville), Darnell Mooney (Chicago to Atlanta), Calvin Ridley (Jacksonville to Tennessee), and Mike Williams (Los Angeles Chargers to New York Jets)
- Tight ends Zach Ertz (Detroit to Washington), Gerald Everett (Los Angeles Chargers to Chicago), Hayden Hurst (Carolina to Los Angeles Chargers), and Jonnu Smith (Atlanta to Miami)
- Offensive linemen Trent Brown (New England to Cincinnati), Lloyd Cushenberry (Denver to Tennessee), Robert Hunt (Miami to Carolina), Jonah Jackson (Detroit to Los Angeles Rams), Damien Lewis (Seattle to Carolina), Tyron Smith (Dallas to New York Jets), Jonah Williams (Cincinnati to Arizona), and Kevin Zeitler (Baltimore to Detroit)
- Defensive linemen Arik Armstead (San Francisco to Jacksonville), Calais Campbell (Atlanta to Miami), Danielle Hunter (Minnesota to Houston), Sheldon Rankins (Houston to Cincinnati), D. J. Reader (Cincinnati to Detroit), Christian Wilkins (Miami to Las Vegas), and Chase Young (San Francisco to New Orleans)
- Linebackers Jadeveon Clowney (Baltimore to Carolina), Jonathan Greenard (Houston to Minnesota), Bryce Huff (New York Jets to Philadelphia), Eric Kendricks (Los Angeles Chargers to Dallas), Patrick Queen (Baltimore to Pittsburgh), and Bobby Wagner (Seattle to Washington)
- Defensive backs Jamal Adams (Seattle to Tennessee), Chidobe Awuzie (Cincinnati to Tennessee). Kevin Byard (Philadelphia to Chicago), Quandre Diggs (Seattle to Tennessee), Kendall Fuller (Washington to Miami), C. J. Gardner-Johnson (Detroit to Philadelphia), Stephon Gilmore (Dallas to Minnesota), Marcus Maye (New Orleans to Miami), Xavier McKinney (New York Giants to Green Bay), Jordan Poyer (Buffalo to Miami), Justin Simmons (Denver to Atlanta), Tre'Davious White (Buffalo to Los Angeles Rams), and Geno Stone (Baltimore to Cincinnati)
- Punters Cameron Johnston (Houston to Pittsburgh) and Tommy Townsend (Kansas City to Houston)

=== Trades ===
The following notable trades were made during the 2024 league year:

- March 13: New England traded QB Mac Jones to Jacksonville in exchange for a 2024 sixth-round selection.
- March 13: Cincinnati traded RB Joe Mixon to Houston in exchange for a 2024 seventh-round selection.
- March 13: Carolina traded LB Brian Burns and a 2024 fifth-round selection to the New York Giants in exchange for 2024 second- and fifth-round selections, and a 2025 conditional fifth-round selection.
- March 13: Pittsburgh traded WR Diontae Johnson and a 2024 seventh-round selection to Carolina in exchange for CB Donte Jackson and a 2024 sixth-round selection.
- March 13: Tampa Bay traded CB Carlton Davis, and 2024 and 2025 sixth-round selections to Detroit in exchange for a 2024 third-round selection.
- March 13: Baltimore traded OT Morgan Moses and a 2024 fourth-round selection (No. 134) to the New York Jets in exchange for a 2024 fourth- and sixth-round selection (Nos. 113 and 185).
- March 14: The Los Angeles Chargers traded WR Keenan Allen to Chicago in exchange for a 2024 fourth-round selection.
- March 14: Washington traded QB Sam Howell and 2024 fourth- and sixth-round selections to Seattle in exchange for 2024 third- and fifth-round selections.
- March 14: Atlanta traded QB Desmond Ridder to Arizona in exchange for WR Rondale Moore.
- March 15: Pittsburgh traded QB Kenny Pickett and a 2024 fourth-round selection to Philadelphia in exchange for a 2024 third-round selection and two 2025 seventh-round selections.
- March 22: Kansas City traded CB L'Jarius Sneed and a 2024 seventh-round selection to Tennessee in exchange for a 2024 seventh-round selection and a 2025 third-round selection.
- March 29: Philadelphia traded LB Haason Reddick to the New York Jets in exchange for a conditional 2026 second or third-round selection based on Reddick's performance.
- April 3: Buffalo traded WR Stefon Diggs, a 2024 sixth-round selection (No. 189 overall), and a 2025 fifth-round selection to Houston in exchange for a 2025 second-round selection.
- August 9: Minnesota traded CB Andrew Booth Jr. to Dallas in exchange for CB Nahshon Wright.
- August 14: New England traded LB Matthew Judon to Atlanta in exchange for a 2025 third-round selection.
- August 22: Washington traded WR Jahan Dotson and a 2025 fifth-round selection to Philadelphia in exchange for a 2025 third-round selection and two 2025 seventh-round selections.
- August 22: Carolina traded LB Michael Barrett to Seattle in exchange for CB Mike Jackson.
- October 15: Las Vegas traded WR Davante Adams to the New York Jets in exchange for a conditional 2025 second or third-round selection based on Adams' performance.
- October 15: Cleveland traded WR Amari Cooper and 2025 sixth-round selection to Buffalo for a 2025 third- and 2026 seventh-round selection.
- October 24: Tennessee traded WR DeAndre Hopkins to Kansas City in exchange for a 2025 fourth or fifth-round selection based on Hopkins' performance.
- October 29: Carolina traded WR Diontae Johnson and a 2025 sixth-round selection to Baltimore in exchange for a 2025 fifth-round selection.
- November 5: The Los Angeles Rams traded CB Tre'Davious White and a 2027 seventh-round selection to Baltimore in exchange for a 2026 seventh-round selection.
- November 5: New Orleans traded CB Marshon Lattimore and a 2025 fifth-round selection to Washington in exchange for 2025 third-, fourth- and sixth-round selections.
- November 5: Cleveland traded LB Za'Darius Smith and a 2026 seventh-round selection to Detroit in exchange for a 2025 fifth-round selection and a 2026 sixth-round selection.
- November 5: Carolina traded WR Jonathan Mingo and a 2025 seventh-round selection to Dallas in exchange for a 2025 fourth-round selection.

=== Retirements ===
Notable retirements

- DT Fletcher Cox – Six-time Pro Bowler, four-time All-Pro (one first-team, three second-team), and Super Bowl LII champion. Played for Philadelphia during his entire 12-year career.
- DT Aaron Donald – Ten-time Pro Bowler, eight-time first-team All-Pro, three-time Defensive Player of the Year (2017, 2018, and 2020), 2014 Defensive Rookie of the Year, and Super Bowl LVI champion. Played for the St. Louis/Los Angeles Rams during his entire 10-year career. Donald later came out of retirement in 2026, rejoining the Rams.
- QB Nick Foles – One-time Pro Bowler and Super Bowl LII champion and MVP. Played for Philadelphia, the St. Louis Rams, Kansas City, Jacksonville, Chicago, and Indianapolis during his 11-year career.
- CB Chris Harris Jr. – Four-time Pro Bowler, three-time All-Pro (one first-team, two second-team), and Super Bowl 50 champion. Played for Denver, the Los Angeles Chargers, and New Orleans during his 12-year career.
- C Jason Kelce – Seven-time Pro Bowler, six-time first-team All-Pro, and Super Bowl LII champion. Played for Philadelphia during his entire 13-year career.
- QB Matt Ryan – Four-time Pro Bowler, one-time first-team All-Pro, 2008 Offensive Rookie of the Year, 2016 Offensive Player of the Year, and 2016 NFL MVP. Played for Atlanta and Indianapolis during his 15-year career.
- WR Matthew Slater – Ten-time Pro Bowler, eight-time All-Pro (five first-team, three second-team) as a special teams player, and three-time Super Bowl champion (XLIX, LI, and LIII). Played for New England during his entire 16-year career.

Other retirements

- Jahleel Addae
- Antony Auclair
- Tavon Austin
- David Blough
- Michael Brockers
- Rex Burkhead
- Malcolm Butler
- Randall Cobb
- Tarik Cohen
- Corey Coleman
- Gareon Conley
- Pharoh Cooper
- Mike Davis
- Kenyan Drake
- Jordan Evans
- James Ferentz
- Michael Gallup
- Markus Golden
- Josh Gordon
- Jeffrey Gunter
- Damien Harris
- Rashard Higgins
- James Hurst
- Ryan Jensen
- David Johnson
- Duke Johnson
- Christian Kirksey
- A. J. Klein
- Sean Mannion
- Colt McCoy
- Thaddeus Moss
- Ty Montgomery
- Justin Murray
- Steven Nelson
- Romeo Okwara
- DeVante Parker
- Rashaad Penny
- Billy Price
- Jalen Richard
- Jon Ryan
- Logan Ryan
- Damion Square
- Carson Strong
- Leighton Vander Esch
- Tyler Vrabel
- Darren Waller
- Derek Watt
- Chase Winovich

=== Draft ===
The 2024 NFL draft took place around Campus Martius Park and Hart Plaza in Detroit, Michigan, on April 25–27. Chicago held the first selection via a trade from Carolina, who posted the league's worst record in 2023, and selected quarterback Caleb Williams out of USC. Five other quarterbacks — Jayden Daniels, Drake Maye, Michael Penix Jr., J. J. McCarthy, and Bo Nix—were taken in the first round, tying the 1983 draft for the most in league history.

== 2024 deaths ==
=== Pro Football Hall of Fame members ===
Larry Allen
Allen played 14 seasons in the NFL as an offensive guard with the Dallas Cowboys and San Francisco 49ers, and was inducted into the Hall of Fame in 2013. He was an 11-time Pro Bowler, seven-time All-Pro (six first-team, one second-team), Super Bowl XXX champion, and was selected to the 1990s and 2000s NFL All-Decade teams and NFL 100th Anniversary All-Time Team. He died on June 2, age 52.
Jimmy E. Johnson
Johnson played 16 seasons in the NFL as a cornerback with the San Francisco 49ers, and was inducted into the Hall of Fame in 1994. He was a five-time Pro Bowler, eight-time All-Pro (four first-team, four second-team), and won the George Halas Award in 1972. He died on May 9, age 86.
Jim Otto
Otto played 15 seasons in the AFL and NFL as a center with the Oakland Raiders, and was inducted into the Hall of Fame in 1980. He was a nine-time AFL All-Star and three-time Pro Bowler, 12-time All-Pro or All-AFL (nine first-team All-AFL, one first-team All-Pro, second-team All-Pro, and second-team All-AFL), was selected to the NFL 100th Anniversary All-Time Team and the AFL All-Time Team, and was a 1967 AFL Champion. He died on May 19, age 86.
Joe Schmidt
Schmidt played 13 seasons in the NFL as a linebacker with the Detroit Lions, and was inducted into the Hall of Fame in 1973. He was a 10-time Pro Bowler, 10-time All-Pro (eight first-team, two second-team), two-time NFL champion (1953 and 1957), and was selected to the NFL 1950s All-Decade Team and NFL 100th Anniversary All-Time Team. He also served as head coach of the Lions for six seasons. He died on September 11, age 92.
Billy Shaw
Shaw played nine seasons in the AFL a guard with the Buffalo Bills, and was inducted into the Hall of Fame in 1999. He was an eight-time AFL All-Star and seven-time All-AFL (five first-team, two second-team), two-time AFL champion (1964 and 1965), and was selected to the AFL All-Time Team. He died on October 4, age 85.
O. J. Simpson
Simpson played 11 seasons in the NFL as a running back with the Buffalo Bills and the San Francisco 49ers, and was inducted into the Hall of Fame in 1985. He was a five-time Pro Bowler, five-time first-team All-Pro, and the 1973 NFL MVP and Offensive Player of the Year. He was also a four time NFL rushing yards leader (1972, 1973, 1975, 1976), two time NFL rushing touchdowns leader (1973, 1975), and the NFL scoring leader in 1975. He was also the first player in NFL history to rush for 2,000 yards in a single season. He died on April 10, age 76.

=== Active personnel ===
Khyree Jackson
Jackson was a rookie cornerback for Minnesota. He died on July 6, age 24, in a car accident.
Joe D'Alessandris
D'Alessandris was the offensive line coach for Baltimore since 2017. He died on August 24, age 70.

== Rule changes ==
The following rule changes were approved at the NFL Owners' Meeting on March 25–26:

- The hip-drop tackle, in which a player "grabs the runner with both hands or wraps the runner with both arms" and "unweights himself by swiveling and dropping his hips and/or lower body, landing on and trapping the runner's leg(s) at or below the knee," was made illegal, penalized as a personal foul (15 yards) and automatic first down if committed by the defense.
- Coaches receive a third challenge if either of their first two challenges are successful. Previously, both challenges needed to be successful to receive a third challenge.
- Major fouls committed by the offense are enforced if both teams commit a foul on a play that results in a change of possession. Previously, major fouls committed by the offense were ignored in that situation.

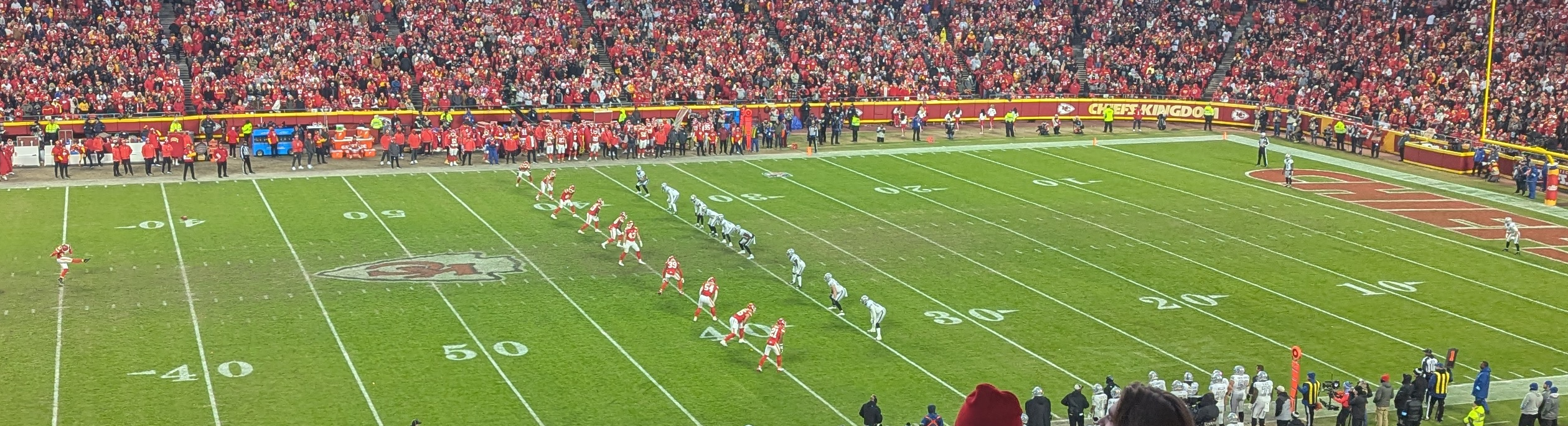
Kansas City Chiefs kicker Matthew Wright (left) kicks off to the Las Vegas Raiders on November 29, 2024, under the 2024 kickoff rules

- The following rule changes for kickoffs were in place for the season on a trial basis, subject to renewal in 2025:
  - While the kickoff is still taken from the kicking team's 35-yard line, all players from the kicking team except the kicker must line up at the receiving team's 40-yard line.
  - The receiving team must have at least nine players in the "set-up zone" (the area between its own 35- and 30-yard lines) and may have a maximum of two returners.
  - Except for the kicker and the returners, no player on either team may move until the ball touches either the ground or a receiving team player. The kicker must also not cross midfield until those other players are allowed to move.
  - The kick must land in the "landing zone", between the 20-yard line and the end zone. If it lands short of the 20-yard line, it is treated like a kickoff out-of-bounds and the receiving team gets the ball at its 40-yard line.
  - If the kick sails into or beyond the end zone for a touchback, the receiving team receives the ball at its 30-yard line.
  - If the kick bounces into the end zone for a touchback, the receiving team receives the ball at its 20-yard line.
  - No fair catch or signal is allowed.
  - During the fourth quarter, the trailing team may choose to attempt an onside kick using the pre-2024 kickoff formation. If an onside kick goes beyond the receiving team's setup zone untouched, the receiving team receives possession at the kicking team's 20 yard line.
- A tee may now be used on a free kick following a safety.
- Rulings of passer down by contact or out of bounds before throwing a pass were made reviewable.
- Replay reviews when there is "clear and obvious visual evidence" that the game clock expired before the snap were authorized.
- The trade deadline was moved from the Tuesday following Week 8 to the Tuesday following Week 9.

== Preseason ==
The majority of training camps were opened on July 24. The preseason began on August 1 with the Pro Football Hall of Fame Game, in which the Chicago Bears (represented in the 2024 Hall of Fame class by Devin Hester, Steve McMichael, and Julius Peppers) "defeated" the Houston Texans (represented by Andre Johnson).

== Regular season ==
The season was played over an 18-week schedule, beginning on September 5, 2024, and ending on January 5, 2025. Each of the league's 32 teams played 17 games, with one bye week.

Each team plays the other three teams in its own division twice, one game against each of the four teams from a division in its own conference, one game against each of the four teams from a division in the other conference, one game against each of the remaining two teams in its conference that finished in the same position in their respective divisions the previous season (e.g., the team that finished fourth in its division would play all three other teams in its conference that also finished fourth in their divisions), and one game against a team in another division in the other conference that also finished in the same position in their respective division the previous season.

The division pairings for 2024 were:

Four intra-conference games
AFC East vs AFC South
AFC North vs AFC West
NFC East vs NFC South
NFC North vs NFC West

Four interconference games
AFC East vs NFC West
AFC North vs NFC East
AFC South vs NFC North
AFC West vs NFC South

Interconference game by 2023 position
AFC East at NFC North
AFC North at NFC South
AFC South at NFC East
AFC West at NFC West

Highlights of the 2024 season included the following:

- NFL Kickoff Game: The season began with the Kickoff Game on September 5, 2024, with Baltimore at defending Super Bowl LVIII champion Kansas City. Kansas City won the game.
- NFL International Series: Five International Series games were on the 2024 schedule. The first game was Green Bay at Philadelphia on September 6 at Arena Corinthians in São Paulo, Brazil, which was the first NFL regular season game held in South America. Three games were also held in London, England, with the New York Jets at Minnesota on October 6 at Tottenham Hotspur Stadium, Jacksonville at Chicago on October 13 at Tottenham, and New England at Jacksonville on October 20 at Wembley Stadium. The fifth game was the New York Giants at Carolina at Allianz Arena in Munich, Germany on November 10. Philadelphia, Minnesota, Chicago, Jacksonville, and Carolina won the games.
- Thanksgiving: Three Thanksgiving Day games were held on November 28, with Chicago at Detroit and the New York Giants at Dallas in the traditional afternoon doubleheader, and Miami at Green Bay in the primetime game. Detroit, Dallas, and Green Bay won the games.
- Christmas: Two Christmas games were held on December 25, with Kansas City at Pittsburgh and Baltimore at Houston. Kansas City and Baltimore won the games.

=== Scheduling changes ===
This was the second season that the league's flexible scheduling system included Monday Night Football games and increased the amount of cross-flexing (switching) of Sunday afternoon games between CBS and Fox.

Week 8:

- The Philadelphia–Cincinnati game was moved from 4:25 p.m. ET to 1:00 p.m. ET, trading time slots with the Chicago–Washington game; both games remaining on CBS.

Week 9:

- The Indianapolis–Minnesota game, originally scheduled for 1:00 p.m. ET on CBS, was flexed into NBC Sunday Night Football at 8:20 p.m. ET, replacing the originally scheduled Jacksonville–Philadelphia game, which was moved to 4:05 p.m. ET on CBS.

Week 11:

- The Cincinnati–Los Angeles Chargers game, originally scheduled for 4:25 p.m. ET on CBS, was flexed into NBC Sunday Night Football at 8:20 p.m. ET, replacing the originally scheduled Indianapolis–New York Jets game, which was moved to 1:00 p.m. ET on CBS.

Week 16:

- The Denver–Los Angeles Chargers game, originally scheduled for 4:05 p.m. ET on Fox, was flexed into Thursday Night Football at 8:15 p.m. ET on Prime Video, replacing the originally scheduled Cleveland–Cincinnati game, which was moved to 1:00 p.m. ET on Sunday on CBS, though it was originally going to be on Fox before being cross-flexed. Although this required Denver to play a second away Thursday game, which is above the league's limit of one per season, Denver agreed to the change.
- The New England–Buffalo game was also moved from 1:00 p.m. ET to 4:25 p.m. ET, remaining on CBS.

Week 17:

- Three games were played on Saturday, December 28, on the NFL Network: Los Angeles Chargers–New England at 1:00 p.m. ET, Denver–Cincinnati at 4:30 p.m. ET, and Arizona–Los Angeles Rams at 8:15 p.m. ET.
- The Atlanta–Washington game was flexed into NBC Sunday Night Football at 8:20 p.m. ET, replacing the originally scheduled Miami–Cleveland game, which was moved to 4:05 p.m. ET on CBS.
- The Green Bay–Minnesota game was moved from 1:00 p.m. ET to 4:25 p.m. ET, trading time slots with the Dallas–Philadelphia game; both games remaining on Fox.

Week 18:

- All Week 18 games were initially listed with a kickoff time of "TBD" and the schedule was released on December 29 after the Sunday games of Week 17 were completed.
  - Two games were selected for the Saturday doubleheader on ESPN and ABC: Cleveland–Baltimore at 4:30 p.m. ET and Cincinnati–Pittsburgh at 8:15 p.m. ET.
  - The Minnesota–Detroit game, which decided the NFC North champion and the top-seed in the NFC, was selected as the final NBC Sunday Night Football game at 8:20 p.m. ET.
  - All remaining games were scheduled on Sunday afternoon at either 1:00 or 4:25 pm ET on either CBS or Fox.

== Regular season standings ==
=== Division ===
AFC East
	W	L	T	PCT	DIV	CONF	PF	PA	STK
^{(2)} Buffalo Bills	13	4	0	.765	5–1	9–3	525	368	L1
Miami Dolphins	8	9	0	.471	3–3	6–6	345	364	L1
New York Jets	5	12	0	.294	2–4	5–7	338	404	W1
New England Patriots	4	13	0	.235	2–4	3–9	289	417	W1

AFC North
	W	L	T	PCT	DIV	CONF	PF	PA	STK
^{(3)} Baltimore Ravens	12	5	0	.706	4–2	8–4	518	361	W4
^{(6)} Pittsburgh Steelers	10	7	0	.588	3–3	7–5	380	347	L4
Cincinnati Bengals	9	8	0	.529	3–3	6–6	472	434	W5
Cleveland Browns	3	14	0	.176	2–4	3–9	258	435	L6

AFC South
	W	L	T	PCT	DIV	CONF	PF	PA	STK
^{(4)} Houston Texans	10	7	0	.588	5–1	8–4	372	372	W1
Indianapolis Colts	8	9	0	.471	3–3	7–5	377	427	W1
Jacksonville Jaguars	4	13	0	.235	3–3	4–8	320	435	L1
Tennessee Titans	3	14	0	.176	1–5	3–9	311	460	L6

AFC West
	W	L	T	PCT	DIV	CONF	PF	PA	STK
^{(1)} Kansas City Chiefs	15	2	0	.882	5–1	10–2	385	326	L1
^{(5)} Los Angeles Chargers	11	6	0	.647	4–2	8–4	402	301	W3
^{(7)} Denver Broncos	10	7	0	.588	3–3	6–6	425	311	W1
Las Vegas Raiders	4	13	0	.235	0–6	3–9	309	434	L1

NFC East
	W	L	T	PCT	DIV	CONF	PF	PA	STK
^{(2)} Philadelphia Eagles	14	3	0	.824	5–1	9–3	463	303	W2
^{(6)} Washington Commanders	12	5	0	.706	4–2	9–3	485	391	W5
Dallas Cowboys	7	10	0	.412	3–3	5–7	350	468	L2
New York Giants	3	14	0	.176	0–6	1–11	273	415	L1

NFC North
	W	L	T	PCT	DIV	CONF	PF	PA	STK
^{(1)} Detroit Lions	15	2	0	.882	6–0	11–1	564	342	W3
^{(5)} Minnesota Vikings	14	3	0	.824	4–2	9–3	432	332	L1
^{(7)} Green Bay Packers	11	6	0	.647	1–5	6–6	460	338	L2
Chicago Bears	5	12	0	.294	1–5	3–9	310	370	W1

NFC South
	W	L	T	PCT	DIV	CONF	PF	PA	STK
^{(3)} Tampa Bay Buccaneers	10	7	0	.588	4–2	8–4	502	385	W2
Atlanta Falcons	8	9	0	.471	4–2	7–5	389	423	L2
Carolina Panthers	5	12	0	.294	2–4	4–8	341	534	W1
New Orleans Saints	5	12	0	.294	2–4	4–8	338	398	L4

NFC West
	W	L	T	PCT	DIV	CONF	PF	PA	STK
^{(4)} Los Angeles Rams	10	7	0	.588	4–2	6–6	367	386	L1
Seattle Seahawks	10	7	0	.588	4–2	6–6	375	368	W2
Arizona Cardinals	8	9	0	.471	3–3	4–8	400	379	W1
San Francisco 49ers	6	11	0	.353	1–5	4–8	389	436	L4

=== Conference ===
AFC
Seed	Team	Division	W	L	T	PCT	DIV	CONF	SOS	SOV	STK
Division leaders
1	Kansas City Chiefs	West	15	2	0	.882	5–1	10–2	.488	.463	L1
2	Buffalo Bills	East	13	4	0	.765	5–1	9–3	.467	.448	L1
3	Baltimore Ravens	North	12	5	0	.706	4–2	8–4	.529	.525	W4
4	Houston Texans	South	10	7	0	.588	5–1	8–4	.481	.376	W1
Wild cards
5	Los Angeles Chargers	West	11	6	0	.647	4–2	8–4	.467	.348	W3
6 (Note: Pittsburgh clinched the #6 seed over Denver based on head-to-head victory.)	Pittsburgh Steelers	North	10	7	0	.588	3–3	7–5	.502	.453	L4
7	Denver Broncos	West	10	7	0	.588	3–3	6–6	.502	.394	W1
Did not qualify for the postseason
8	Cincinnati Bengals	North	9	8	0	.529	3–3	6–6	.478	.314	W5
9 (Note: Indianapolis finished ahead of Miami based on head-to-head victory.)	Indianapolis Colts	South	8	9	0	.471	3–3	7–5	.457	.309	W1
10	Miami Dolphins	East	8	9	0	.471	3–3	6–6	.419	.294	L1
11	New York Jets	East	5	12	0	.294	2–4	5–7	.495	.341	W1
12 (Note: Jacksonville finished ahead of New England and Las Vegas based on conference record. (Jacksonville 4–8 to New England 3–9 to Las Vegas 3–9))	Jacksonville Jaguars	South	4	13	0	.235	3–3	4–8	.478	.265	L1
13 (Note: New England finished ahead of Las Vegas based on strength of victory. (New England .471 to Las Vegas .353))	New England Patriots	East	4	13	0	.235	2–4	3–9	.471	.471	W1
14	Las Vegas Raiders	West	4	13	0	.235	0–6	3–9	.540	.353	L1
15 (Note: Cleveland finished ahead of Tennessee based on strength of victory. (Cleveland .510 to Tennessee .431))	Cleveland Browns	North	3	14	0	.176	2–4	3–9	.536	.510	L6
16	Tennessee Titans	South	3	14	0	.176	1–5	3–9	.522	.431	L6
Tiebreakers (Note: When breaking ties for three or more teams under the NFL's rules, they are first broken within divisions, then comparing only the highest ranked remaining team from each division.)

NFC
Seed	Team	Division	W	L	T	PCT	DIV	CONF	SOS	SOV	STK
Division leaders
1	Detroit Lions	North	15	2	0	.882	6–0	11–1	.516	.494	W3
2	Philadelphia Eagles	East	14	3	0	.824	5–1	9–3	.453	.424	W2
3 (Note: Tampa Bay clinched the #3 seed over Los Angeles based on conference record. (Tampa Bay 8–4 to Los Angeles 6–6))	Tampa Bay Buccaneers	South	10	7	0	.588	4–2	8–4	.502	.465	W2
4 (Note: Los Angeles clinched the NFC West and #4 seed over Seattle based on strength of victory. (Los Angeles .441 to Seattle .424))	Los Angeles Rams	West	10	7	0	.588	4–2	6–6	.505	.441	L1
Wild cards
5	Minnesota Vikings	North	14	3	0	.824	4–2	9–3	.474	.408	L1
6	Washington Commanders	East	12	5	0	.706	4–2	9–3	.436	.358	W5
7	Green Bay Packers	North	11	6	0	.647	1–5	6–6	.533	.412	L2
Did not qualify for the postseason
8	Seattle Seahawks	West	10	7	0	.588	4–2	6–6	.498	.424	W2
9 (Note: Atlanta finished ahead of Arizona based on conference record. (Atlanta 7–5 to Arizona 4–8))	Atlanta Falcons	South	8	9	0	.471	4–2	7–5	.519	.426	L2
10	Arizona Cardinals	West	8	9	0	.471	3–3	4–8	.536	.404	W1
11	Dallas Cowboys	East	7	10	0	.412	3–3	5–7	.522	.387	L2
12	San Francisco 49ers	West	6	11	0	.353	1–5	4–8	.564	.402	L4
13 (Note: Chicago finished ahead of Carolina based on head-to-head victory.)	Chicago Bears	North	5	12	0	.294	1–5	3–9	.554	.388	W1
14 (Note: Carolina finished ahead of New Orleans based on strength of victory. (Carolina .329 to New Orleans .306))	Carolina Panthers	South	5	12	0	.294	2–4	4–8	.498	.329	W1
15	New Orleans Saints	South	5	12	0	.294	2–4	4–8	.505	.306	L4
16	New York Giants	East	3	14	0	.176	0–6	1–11	.554	.412	L1
Tiebreakers (Note: When breaking ties for three or more teams under the NFL's rules, they are first broken within divisions, then comparing only the highest ranked remaining team from each division.)

== Postseason ==
The playoffs began with the Wild Card round, with three Wild Card games played in each conference. Wild Card games took place on January 11–13, 2025. In the Divisional round on January 18 and 19, the top seed in the conference played the lowest remaining seed and the other two remaining teams played each other. The winners of those games advanced to the AFC and NFC Championship games played on January 26. Super Bowl LIX between the Kansas City Chiefs and the Philadelphia Eagles was held on February 9 at Caesars Superdome in New Orleans, Louisiana.

=== 2024–25 NFL playoffs ===
Jan 11 – M&T Bank Stadium	Jan 19 – Highmark Stadium
6	Pittsburgh	14
3	Baltimore	28
3	Baltimore	25
Jan 26 – Arrowhead Stadium
Jan 12 – Highmark Stadium	2	Buffalo	27
AFC
7	Denver	7	2	Buffalo	29
Jan 18 – Arrowhead Stadium
2	Buffalo	31	1	Kansas City	32
AFC Championship
Jan 11 – NRG Stadium	4	Houston	14
1	Kansas City	23
5	LA Chargers	12
Divisional round	Feb 9 – Caesars Superdome
4	Houston	32
Wild-card round
A1	Kansas City	22
Jan 12 – Raymond James Stadium	Jan 18 – Ford Field	N2	Philadelphia	40
Super Bowl LIX
6	Washington	23
3	Tampa Bay	20
6	Washington	45
Jan 26 – Lincoln Financial Field
Jan 13 – State Farm Stadium (Note: The Wild Card playoff game between the Minnesota Vikings and the Los Angeles Rams was moved from SoFi Stadium in Inglewood, California, to State Farm Stadium in Glendale, Arizona, due to the then-ongoing wildfires in California.)	1	Detroit	31
NFC
5	Minnesota	9	6	Washington	23
Jan 19 – Lincoln Financial Field
4	LA Rams	27	2	Philadelphia	55
NFC Championship
Jan 12 – Lincoln Financial Field	4	LA Rams	22
2	Philadelphia	28
7	Green Bay	10
2	Philadelphia	22

== Records, milestones, and notable statistics ==
Week 1

- Ryan Rehkow set the record for gross punt average in a game (minimum four punts), with 64.5 yards. The previous record of 63.6 yards was held by A. J. Cole III.
- Lamar Jackson passed Russell Wilson for the third-most career rushing yards for a quarterback.

Week 2

- Braelon Allen tied the record for youngest player to score a touchdown from scrimmage, at age 20 years, 239 days. He shares the record with Arnie Herber.
- Allen also set the record for becoming the youngest player to score multiple touchdowns in a game.
- Brock Bowers set the record for most receptions and receiving yards in a tight end's first two games of his career, with 15 and 156 respectively.
- The Green Bay Packers became the first NFL franchise to have 800 wins.

Week 3

- Aaron Rodgers became the sixth quarterback to win 150 starts.
- Malik Nabers set the record for becoming the youngest wide receiver to have multiple touchdowns in a game, at 21 years, 56 days of age. The previous record of 21 years, 73 days was held by Mike Evans.
- Nabers also became the first player with at least 20 receptions, 250 receiving yards, and three touchdowns in his first three career games.
- Patrick Mahomes set the record for most wins in a quarterback's first 100 starts, ultimately with 78. The previous record of 76 was shared by Tom Brady and Roger Staubach.
- Jayden Daniels set the record for highest completion percentage for a rookie in a game (minimum 20 attempts), completing 91.3% of his passes. The previous record of 88.9% was held by Dak Prescott.
- The Washington–Cincinnati game was the first game to have no turnovers or punts since 1940.

Week 4

- Bobby Wagner passed Zach Thomas for fourth place in career tackles.
- Malik Nabers became the third player in the Super Bowl era to have at least 30 receptions in his first four games, joining Puka Nacua and Anquan Boldin.
- Sam Darnold became the first quarterback in the Super Bowl era to win and have at least two passing touchdowns in each of his first four games with a new team.
- Jared Goff set the record for most completed passes in a game without an incomplete pass, with 18. The previous record of 10 was held by Kurt Warner.
- Goff also set the record for most passing yards in a game without an incomplete pass, with 292. The previous record of 179 was held by Frank Filchock.

Week 5

- Aaron Rodgers became the ninth player to have 60,000 passing yards.
- Jayden Daniels became the first rookie to have at least 1,000 passing yards and 250 rushing yards in his first five games.
- T. J. Watt joined his brother J. J. Watt to become the first set of brothers to have at least 100 sacks each.
- Maxx Crosby became the fourth player to have at least one sack in ten consecutive games against a single opponent, doing so against the Denver Broncos.
- Xavier McKinney became the first player since 1970 to intercept a pass in each of his first five games.

Week 6

- Deebo Samuel became the first wide receiver to have at least 20 receiving touchdowns and 20 rushing touchdowns.
- Lamar Jackson passed Cam Newton for the second-most career rushing yards for a quarterback.

Week 7

- Brock Bowers set the record for most receptions in a tight end's first seven games of his career, with 47. The previous record of 42 was held by Keith Jackson.
- Mike Evans became the 11th player to reach 100 touchdown receptions.

Week 8

- Patrick Mahomes became the fastest player to reach 30,000 passing yards, doing so in 103 games. The previous record of 109 games was held by Matthew Stafford.
- Justin Jefferson set the record for most games with at least 100 receiving yards in a player's first five seasons, currently with 33. Randy Moss held previous record, with 30 games.

Week 9

- Derek Carr became the first starting quarterback to have lost to 31 different NFL teams.
- Matthew Stafford became the ninth player to have 5,000 career pass completions.
- Derrick Henry became the 10th player to reach 100 rushing touchdowns.
- Henry also became the third player to have at least ten rushing touchdowns in seven straight seasons, joining Adrian Peterson and LaDainian Tomlinson.
- Lamar Jackson set the record for most career games with a perfect passer rating (minimum 10 attempts per game), with four. He shared the previous record of three with four other players.
- Kamren Kinchens tied the record for the longest non-special teams touchdown by a rookie, with a 103-yard interception return. He shares the record with Pete Barnum.

Week 10

- Ja'Marr Chase set the record for most receiving yards against a single opponent in a season, with 457 in two games against Baltimore. The previous record of 428 yards was held by Art Powell.
- Chase also became the first player to have multiple games with at least 250 receiving yards and two receiving touchdowns.
- Justin Herbert set the record for most completed passes in a player's first five seasons, ultimately with 1,945. The previous record of 1,759 passes was held by Derek Carr.
- Josh Allen set the record for most games with at least 250 passing yards and 50 rushing yards, with 14. He shared the previous record of 13 with Lamar Jackson, Cam Newton, and Russell Wilson.
- Jalen Hurts became the first quarterback to have 10 rushing touchdowns in four consecutive seasons.

Week 11

- Brock Bowers set the record for most receptions in a game by a rookie tight end, with 13. The previous record of 12 was held by Mark Bavaro.

Week 12

- Kaʻimi Fairbairn set the record for most field goals made in a season from at least 50 yards, ultimately with 13. He shared the previous record of 11 with Daniel Carlson.
- Patrick Mahomes tied the record for most games with at least three passing touchdowns and no interceptions during a player's first eight seasons, with 24. He shares the record with Russell Wilson.

Week 13

- Josh Allen became the first player to score a rushing touchdown, a receiving touchdown and multiple passing touchdowns in a single game.
- Bobby Wagner extended his streak of recording 100 tackles in a season to 13 years. He is the second player to record the feat, joining London Fletcher.
- Jayden Daniels became the first rookie to complete 80 percent of his passes, throw three touchdowns, and run for a touchdown in a single game.
- Jameis Winston became the first player in the Super Bowl era to have at least 400 passing yards, four passing touchdowns and two interceptions returned for touchdowns in a game.
- Justin Herbert became the third player to have at least 10 consecutive games without interception (minimum 15 attempts per game), joining Tom Brady and Derek Carr.
- The Pittsburgh Steelers tied the record for most consecutive seasons finishing with a winning percentage of .500 or better, with 21. They share the record with the Dallas Cowboys, who did so from 1965 to 1985.
- The Cincinnati Bengals tied the single-season record for most games lost while scoring at least 30 points, with four. They share the record with the 2002 Kansas City Chiefs.

Week 14

- Brock Bowers set the record for most receptions in a season for a rookie tight end, ultimately with 112. The previous record of 86 was held by Sam LaPorta.
- Josh Allen became the second player to pass for three touchdowns and rush for three touchdowns in a game.
- Allen also set the record for most games with multiple passing touchdowns and multiple rushing touchdowns, with five. The previous record of four was held by Steve Young.
- Puka Nacua tied the record for most games with at least 150 scrimmage yards by a wide receiver in his first two seasons, with five. He shares the record with Randy Moss and Jerry Rice.
- Justin Jefferson became the first player to have 7,000 receiving yards in his first five seasons.
- The Buffalo Bills became the first team to lose a game despite scoring at least six touchdowns and having no turnovers.

Week 15

- Lamar Jackson became the second quarterback to record 6,000 career rushing yards, joining Michael Vick.
- Jayden Daniels became the fifth player and first rookie to have a completion percentage of at least 80% in four games in a season (minimum 20 attempts per game).
- Davante Adams became the 12th player to reach 100 touchdown receptions.

Week 16

- Cameron Dicker set the record for the longest successful fair catch kick, at 57 yards. The previous record of 52 yards was held by Paul Hornung. This was also the first successful fair catch kick since 1976.
- Brock Bowers became the third rookie tight end to have at least 1,000 receiving yards in a season, joining Mike Ditka and Kyle Pitts.
- Jayden Daniels became the sixth rookie to throw five touchdown passes in a game.
- Daniels also set the record for most Rookie of the Week awards, with ten. The previous record of nine was held by Ben Roethlisberger.

Week 17

- Lamar Jackson set the record for most career rushing yards for a quarterback, with 6,110. The previous record of 6,109 was held by Michael Vick.
- Joe Burrow became the fourth player to have in a season at least 10 games with at least 250 passing yards and three passing touchdowns.
- Brock Bowers set the record for most receptions in a season by a rookie, ultimately with 108. The previous record of 105 was held by Puka Nacua.
- Bowers also set the record for most receiving yards by a rookie tight end in a season, ultimately with 1,194. The previous record of 1,076 was held by Mike Ditka.
- Saquon Barkley became the ninth player to have 2,000 rushing yards in a season.
- Jayden Daniels set the record for most rushing yards by a rookie quarterback, finishing with 891. The previous record of 815 was held by Robert Griffin III.
- Aaron Rodgers set the record for most sacks taken by a quarterback in his career, with 568. The previous record of 565 was held by Tom Brady.
- Malik Nabers and Tyrone Tracy became the second pair of rookie teammates to each have 1,000 yards from scrimmage, joining Reggie Bush and Marques Colston.
- The Buffalo Bills tied the record for most players to score a receiving touchdown in a season, with 13 players doing so. They share the record with the 2016 Atlanta Falcons.
- The Detroit–San Francisco game was the first game to have at least 10 combined touchdowns and no punts since 1937.

Week 18

- Mike Evans tied the record for consecutive seasons with at least 1,000 receiving yards, with 11. He shares this record with Jerry Rice. Evans also extended his own record of most such seasons to start his career.
- Aaron Rodgers became the fifth player to have 500 passing touchdowns.
- Trey McBride set the record for most receptions by a tight end in his first three seasons, with 221. The previous record of 216 was held by George Kittle.
- The Buffalo Bills became the first team to score at least 30 rushing touchdowns and at least 30 passing touchdowns in a season.

Wild Card Round

- Derrick Henry tied the record for most postseason games with at least 150 rushing yards, with four. He shares the record with Terrell Davis.
- Ladd McConkey set the record for most receiving yards in a postseason game by a rookie, with 197. The previous record of 181 was held by Puka Nacua.
- Bo Nix and Troy Franklin recorded the first rookie-to-rookie touchdown pass during a postseason game.
- The Los Angeles Rams tied the record for most quarterback sacks in a postseason game, with nine. They share the record with three other teams.
- The Minnesota Vikings set the record for most postseason games lost with 32. They shared the previous record of 31 with the Dallas Cowboys.

Divisional Round

- The Washington Commanders and Detroit Lions set the record for most combined points scored in a quarter of a postseason game, with 42 points in the second quarter.

Conference Championship games

- The Philadelphia Eagles set the record for the most points scored in a conference championship game, with 55. The previous record of 51 was held by the 1990 Buffalo Bills.
- Philadelphia also tied the record for most rushing touchdowns in a postseason game, with seven. They share the record with the 1940 Chicago Bears.
- Jalen Hurts set the record for most postseason rushing touchdowns by a quarterback, with nine. The previous record of eight was held by Steve Young.
- Hurts also tied his own record for most rushing touchdowns by a quarterback in a postseason game, with three. In addition, he shares this record with Otto Graham.
- Hurts and Saquon Barkley became the first pair of teammates to each score at least three rushing touchdowns in a postseason game.
- Jayden Daniels set the record for most passing yards by a rookie in the postseason, with 577. The previous record of 572 was held by Russell Wilson.

Super Bowl LIX

- Travis Kelce set the record for most career receptions in Super Bowls, with 35. The previous record of 33 was held by Jerry Rice.
- Jalen Hurts became the first player to record at least 200 passing and 50 rushing yards in multiple Super Bowls.
- Hurts also broke his own record for most rushing yards for a quarterback in a Super Bowl, with 72. The previous record was 70.

== Regular-season statistical leaders ==
Individual
Scoring leader	Chris Boswell	Pittsburgh	158
Most field goals made	Chris Boswell	Pittsburgh	41
Touchdowns	Jahmyr Gibbs	Detroit	20
Rushing yards	Saquon Barkley	Philadelphia	2,005
Passing yards	Joe Burrow	Cincinnati	4,918
Passing touchdowns	Joe Burrow	Cincinnati	43
Interceptions thrown	Kirk Cousins	Atlanta	16
Interceptions thrown	Baker Mayfield	Tampa Bay	16
Passer rating	Lamar Jackson	Baltimore	119.6
Pass receptions	Ja'Marr Chase	Cincinnati	127
Pass receiving yards	Ja'Marr Chase	Cincinnati	1,708
Combined tackles	Zaire Franklin	Indianapolis	173
Interceptions	Kerby Joseph	Detroit	9
Punting	Corey Bojorquez	Cleveland	4,387; avg 49.3
Sacks	Trey Hendrickson	Cincinnati	17.5

== Awards ==
The 14th NFL Honors, honoring the best players from the season, was held at the Saenger Theater in New Orleans, Louisiana on February 6, 2025.

Award	Winner	Position	Team
Most Valuable Player	Josh Allen	QB	Buffalo Bills
Offensive Player of the Year	Saquon Barkley	RB	Philadelphia Eagles
Defensive Player of the Year	Patrick Surtain II	CB	Denver Broncos
Offensive Rookie of the Year	Jayden Daniels	QB	Washington Commanders
Defensive Rookie of the Year	Jared Verse	OLB	Los Angeles Rams
Comeback Player of the Year	Joe Burrow	QB	Cincinnati Bengals
Coach of the Year	Kevin O'Connell	HC	Minnesota Vikings
Assistant Coach of the Year	Ben Johnson	OC	Detroit Lions
Executive of the Year	Brad Holmes	GM	Detroit Lions
Super Bowl Most Valuable Player	Jalen Hurts	QB	Philadelphia Eagles
Walter Payton Man of the Year	Arik Armstead	DE	Jacksonville Jaguars

=== All-Pro team ===
The following players were named first-team All-Pro by the Associated Press (AP):

Offense
QB	Lamar Jackson (BAL)
RB	Saquon Barkley (PHI)
WR	Ja'Marr Chase (CIN); Justin Jefferson (MIN); Amon-Ra St. Brown (DET)
TE	Brock Bowers (LV)
LT	Tristan Wirfs (TB)
LG	Joe Thuney (KC)
C	Creed Humphrey (KC)
RG	Quinn Meinerz (DEN)
RT	Penei Sewell (DET)

Defense
DE	Myles Garrett (CLE); Trey Hendrickson (CIN)
DT	Cameron Heyward (PIT); Chris Jones (KC)
LB	Zack Baun (PHI); Fred Warner (SF); Roquan Smith (BAL)
CB	Patrick Surtain II (DEN); Derek Stingley Jr. (HOU); Marlon Humphrey (BAL)
S	Kerby Joseph (DET); Xavier McKinney (GB)

Special teams
K	Chris Boswell (PIT)
P	Jack Fox (DET)
KR	KaVontae Turpin (DAL)
PR	Marvin Mims Jr. (DEN)
ST	Brenden Schooler (NE)
LS	Andrew DePaola (MIN)

=== Players of the Week / Month ===
The following were named the top performers during the season:

Week / Month	Offensive		Defensive		Special Teams	
Week / Month	AFC	NFC	AFC	NFC	AFC	NFC
1	Joe Mixon RB (Houston)	Saquon Barkley RB (Philadelphia)	Gregory Rousseau DE (Buffalo)	Tyrique Stevenson CB (Chicago)	Chris Boswell K (Pittsburgh)	Jake Moody K (San Francisco)
2	James Cook RB (Buffalo)	Alvin Kamara RB (New Orleans)	Maxx Crosby DE (Las Vegas)	Jessie Bates S (Atlanta)	Kaʻimi Fairbairn K (Houston)	Austin Seibert K (Washington)
3	Josh Allen QB (Buffalo)	Jayden Daniels QB (Washington)	Jaylon Jones CB (Indianapolis)	Jonathan Greenard OLB (Minnesota)	Wil Lutz K (Denver)	Jack Fox P (Detroit)
4	Derrick Henry RB (Baltimore)	Jared Goff QB (Detroit)	Chris Jones DT (Kansas City)	Troy Andersen LB (Atlanta)	Nick Folk K (Tennessee)	Tory Taylor P (Chicago)
Sept.	Josh Allen QB (Buffalo)	Sam Darnold QB (Minnesota)	Kyle Van Noy LB (Baltimore)	Aidan Hutchinson DE (Detroit)	Chris Boswell K (Pittsburgh)	Brandon Aubrey K (Dallas)
5	Lamar Jackson QB (Baltimore)	Kirk Cousins QB (Atlanta)	Patrick Surtain II CB (Denver)	Xavier McKinney S (Green Bay)	Ka'imi Fairbairn K (Houston)	Isaiah Simmons S (New York Giants)
6	Derrick Henry RB (Baltimore)	Sean Tucker RB (Tampa Bay)	Will Anderson Jr. DE (Houston)	Brian Branch S (Detroit)	Rigoberto Sanchez P (Indianapolis)	Cole Kmet TE (Chicago)
7	Lamar Jackson QB (Baltimore)	Saquon Barkley RB (Philadelphia)	Cody Barton LB (Denver)	Cobie Durant CB (Los Angeles Rams)	Charlie Jones WR (Cincinnati)	Jake Bates K (Detroit)
8	Jameis Winston QB (Cleveland)	Kirk Cousins QB (Atlanta)	T. J. Watt OLB (Pittsburgh)	Edgerrin Cooper LB (Green Bay)	Calvin Austin III WR (Pittsburgh)	Kalif Raymond WR (Detroit)
Oct.	Lamar Jackson QB (Baltimore)	Jared Goff QB (Detroit)	Will Anderson Jr. DE (Houston)	Xavier McKinney S (Green Bay)	Chris Boswell K (Pittsburgh)	Chad Ryland K (Arizona)
9	Garrett Wilson WR (New York Jets)	Saquon Barkley RB (Philadelphia)	Trey Hendrickson DE (Cincinnati)	Kamren Kinchens S (Los Angeles Rams)	Tyler Bass K (Buffalo)	Blake Gillikin P (Arizona)
10	Lamar Jackson QB (Baltimore)	Kyler Murray QB (Arizona)	Taron Johnson CB (Buffalo)	Zack Baun LB (Philadelphia)	Leo Chenal LB (Kansas City)	Jake Bates K (Detroit)
11	Bo Nix QB (Denver)	Taysom Hill TE (New Orleans)	Terrel Bernard LB (Buffalo)	Kamren Kinchens S (Los Angeles Rams)	Chris Boswell K (Pittsburgh)	Karl Brooks DT (Green Bay)
12	Tua Tagovailoa QB (Miami)	Saquon Barkley RB (Philadelphia)	Myles Garrett DE (Cleveland)	Coby Bryant S (Seattle)	Wil Lutz K (Denver)	KaVontae Turpin WR (Dallas)
13	Josh Allen QB (Buffalo)	Bucky Irving RB (Tampa Bay)	Tarheeb Still CB (Los Angeles Chargers)	Leonard Williams DE (Seattle)	Kene Nwangwu RB (New York Jets)	Braden Mann P (Philadelphia)
Nov.	Joe Burrow QB (Cincinnati)	Saquon Barkley RB (Philadelphia)	Patrick Surtain II CB (Denver)	Jonathan Greenard OLB (Minnesota)	Jason Sanders K (Miami)	Jake Bates K (Detroit)
14	Ja'Marr Chase WR (Cincinnati)	Sam Darnold QB (Minnesota)	Zach Sieler DT (Miami)	Yetur Gross-Matos DE (San Francisco)	Matthew Wright K (Kansas City)	Bryan Bresee DT (New Orleans)
15	Josh Allen QB (Buffalo)	Baker Mayfield QB (Tampa Bay)	Derek Stingley Jr. CB (Houston)	Edgerrin Cooper LB (Green Bay)	Marvin Mims WR (Denver)	KhaDarel Hodge WR (Atlanta)
16	Jonathan Taylor RB (Indianapolis)	Chuba Hubbard RB (Carolina)	Isaiah Pola-Mao SS (Las Vegas)	Andrew Van Ginkel OLB (Minnesota)	Jason Sanders K (Miami)	Brandon Aubrey K (Dallas)
17	Joe Burrow QB (Cincinnati)	Baker Mayfield QB (Tampa Bay)	Tyrel Dodson LB (Miami)	C. J. Gardner-Johnson CB (Philadelphia)	Cameron Dicker K (Los Angeles Chargers)	Ihmir Smith-Marsette WR (New York Giants)
18	Bo Nix QB (Denver)	Jahmyr Gibbs RB (Detroit)	Trey Hendrickson DE (Cincinnati)	YaYa Diaby OLB (Tampa Bay)	Cameron Dicker K (Los Angeles Chargers)	Josh Blackwell CB (Chicago)
Dec./Jan.	Joe Burrow QB (Cincinnati)	Jahmyr Gibbs RB (Detroit)	Derwin James S (Los Angeles Chargers)	Leonard Williams DE (Seattle)	Jason Sanders K (Miami)	Joshua Karty K (Los Angeles Rams)

Week	FedEx Air & Ground Players of the Week		Pepsi Zero Sugar Rookie of the Week
1	Baker Mayfield QB (Tampa Bay)	Joe Mixon RB (Houston)	Jayden Daniels QB (Washington)
2	Kyler Murray QB (Arizona)	Alvin Kamara RB (New Orleans)	Braelon Allen RB (New York Jets)
3	Andy Dalton QB (Carolina)	Jauan Jennings WR (San Francisco)	Jayden Daniels QB (Washington)
4	Jayden Daniels QB (Washington)	Derrick Henry RB (Baltimore)	Jayden Daniels QB (Washington)
5	Joe Burrow QB (Cincinnati)	Ja'Marr Chase WR (Cincinnati)	Jayden Daniels QB (Washington)
6	Jordan Love QB (Green Bay)	Caleb Williams QB (Chicago)	Jayden Daniels QB (Washington)
7	Jared Goff QB (Detroit)	Jahmyr Gibbs RB (Detroit)	Keon Coleman WR (Buffalo)
8	Jayden Daniels QB (Washington)	Jahmyr Gibbs RB (Detroit)	Jayden Daniels QB (Washington)
9	Joe Burrow QB (Cincinnati)	Saquon Barkley RB (Philadelphia)	Jayden Daniels QB (Washington)
10	Joe Burrow QB (Cincinnati)	Ja'Marr Chase WR (Cincinnati)	Bo Nix QB (Denver)
11	Bo Nix QB (Denver)	Taysom Hill TE (New Orleans)	Bo Nix QB (Denver)
12	Tua Tagovailoa QB (Miami)	Saquon Barkley RB (Philadelphia)	Bo Nix QB (Denver)
13	Russell Wilson QB (Pittsburgh)	Josh Allen QB (Buffalo)	Jayden Daniels QB (Washington)
14	Josh Allen QB (Buffalo)	Zach Charbonnet RB (Seattle)	Tyrice Knight LB (Seattle)
15	Josh Allen QB (Buffalo)	Mike Evans WR (Tampa Bay)	Jayden Daniels QB (Washington)
16	Jayden Daniels QB (Washington)	Jonathan Taylor RB (Indianapolis)	Jayden Daniels QB (Washington)
17	Joe Burrow QB (Cincinnati)	Tee Higgins WR (Cincinnati)	Jayden Daniels QB (Washington)
18	Bo Nix QB (Denver)	Jahmyr Gibbs RB (Detroit)	Mike Sainristil CB (Washington)

Month	Rookies of the Month	
Month	Offensive	Defensive
Sept.	Jayden Daniels QB (Washington)	Jared Verse OLB (Los Angeles Rams)
Oct.	Bo Nix QB (Denver)	Beanie Bishop CB (Pittsburgh)
Nov.	Brock Bowers TE (Las Vegas)	Braden Fiske DT (Los Angeles Rams)
Dec./Jan.	Brian Thomas Jr. WR (Jacksonville)	Edgerrin Cooper LB (Green Bay)

== Head coaching and general manager changes ==
=== Head coaches ===
==== Off-season ====
Team	Departing coach	Interim coach	Incoming coach	Reason for leaving	Notes
Atlanta Falcons	Arthur Smith		Raheem Morris	Fired	Smith was fired on January 8, after three seasons with the Falcons. During his tenure, the team was 21–30 (.412), with no playoff appearances. Morris was hired on January 25. Morris was previously the defensive coordinator for the Los Angeles Rams from 2021–2023. This is his third head coaching position, having previously served as the head coach of the Tampa Bay Buccaneers from 2009–2011, as well as the interim head coach of the Falcons during the 2020 season, compiling an overall record of 21–38 (.356).
Carolina Panthers	Frank Reich	Chris Tabor	Dave Canales	Fired	On November 27, 2023, Reich was fired after a 1–10 (.091) start in his first year as Panthers' head coach. Tabor, the team's special teams coordinator, was elevated as interim head coach. This was his second experience as head coach. He finished the season with a 1–5 (.167) record. Canales was hired on January 25. A long-time offensive assistant for Seattle, he was most recently the offensive coordinator for the Tampa Bay Buccaneers for the 2023 season. This is his first head coaching position at any level.
Las Vegas Raiders	Josh McDaniels	Antonio Pierce		Fired	After a 3–5 (.375) start, McDaniels was fired on October 31, 2023, after one and a half seasons with the team. During his tenure, the Raiders were 9–16 (.360) with no playoff appearances. Pierce, the team's linebackers coach, was promoted to interim head coach. This was his first head coaching position. He finished the season with a 5–4 (.556) record. On January 19, Pierce was named the full-time head coach of the Raiders.
Los Angeles Chargers	Brandon Staley	Giff Smith	Jim Harbaugh	Fired	After a 5–9 (.357) start, Staley was fired on December 15 after almost three seasons with the team. During his tenure, the Chargers were 24–24 (.500) with one playoff appearance and no playoff wins. Smith, the team's outside linebackers coach, was elevated as interim head coach. This was his first head coaching position. He finished the season with an 0–3 (.000) record. Harbaugh was hired on January 24. This is his second NFL coaching position, previously coaching the San Francisco 49ers from 2011–2014, leading them to two NFC West division titles, three consecutive NFC Championship Game appearances and a Super Bowl appearance, ending his tenure with a regular season record of 44–19–1 (.695). He was most recently the head coach at Michigan from 2015–2023, leading the Wolverines to three College Football Playoff appearances and a National Championship in 2023. His college experience also included stints at San Diego and Stanford, and his overall college record was 144–52 (.735).
New England Patriots	Bill Belichick		Jerod Mayo	Mutual agreement	On January 11, Belichick and the Patriots mutually agreed to part ways after 24 seasons together. In that period, the team compiled a regular season record of 266–121 (.687), winning the AFC East division title 17 times with 18 overall playoff appearances. In the post-season, the team compiled a record of 30–12 (.714), with 13 AFC Championship Game appearances, nine Super Bowl appearances, and six Super Bowl championships (XXXVI, XXXVIII, XXXIX, XLIX, LI, and LIII). Mayo was hired on January 12. A Patriots linebacker from 2008 to 2015 (Defensive Rookie of the Year in 2008) and a Patriots defensive coach from 2019 to 2023, this is his first head coaching position at any level.
Seattle Seahawks	Pete Carroll		Mike Macdonald	Reassigned	On January 10, Carroll was reassigned to an advisor role after 14 seasons as head coach of the Seahawks. During his tenure, the team was 137–89–1 (.606). The team made the playoffs ten times, including five NFC West division titles, two Super Bowl appearances, the Super Bowl XLVIII championship, and an overall playoff record of 10–9 (.526). Macdonald was hired on January 31. A long time Ravens defensive assistant, he was most recently the Ravens' defensive coordinator from 2022–2023. This is his first head coaching position at any level.
Tennessee Titans	Mike Vrabel		Brian Callahan	Fired	On January 9, Vrabel was fired after six seasons with the Titans. During his tenure, the team was 54–45 (.545), with two AFC South division titles in three overall playoff appearances, and a playoff record of 2–3 (.400). Callahan was hired on January 24. A long time offensive assistant for several teams, he was most recently the Cincinnati Bengals' offensive coordinator from 2019–2023. This is his first head coaching position at any level.
Washington Commanders	Ron Rivera		Dan Quinn	Fired	On January 8, Rivera was fired after four seasons with the Commanders. During his tenure, the team was 26–40–1 (.396), with one playoff appearance and no playoff wins. Quinn was hired on February 3. This is his second head coaching position, previously coaching the Atlanta Falcons from 2015–2020, leading them to two playoff appearances and a Super Bowl appearance, ending his tenure with a regular season record of 43–42 (.506). He was most recently the defensive coordinator of the Dallas Cowboys from 2021–2023, with his unit leading the league in takeaways all three years.

==== In-season ====
Team	Departing coach	Reason for leaving	Interim replacement	Notes
Chicago Bears	Matt Eberflus	Fired	Thomas Brown	After a 4–8 (.333) start including a 6-game losing streak, Eberflus was fired as head coach on November 29 after being hired in 2022. During his two and a half season tenure, Chicago was 14–32 (.304) with no playoff appearances. Brown, the team's offensive coordinator, was named as interim head coach. This is his first head coaching position at any level.
New Orleans Saints	Dennis Allen	Fired	Darren Rizzi	After a 2–7 (.222) start including a 7-game losing streak, Allen was fired on November 4 after two and a half seasons as the team's head coach. During his tenure, the Saints were 18–25 (.419) with no playoff appearances. Rizzi, the team's special teams coordinator, was elevated as interim head coach. This is his first experience as NFL head coach. He was the head coach of New Haven and Rhode Island with a combined record of 18–23 (.439).
New York Jets	Robert Saleh	Fired	Jeff Ulbrich	Saleh was fired as head coach on October 8 with a 20–36 (.357) record (2–3 in 2024) after being hired in 2021. Ulbrich, the team's defensive coordinator, was named interim head coach. This is his first head coaching position.

=== General managers ===
==== Off-season ====
Team	Departing general manager	Interim replacement	Incoming general manager	Reason for leaving	Notes
Carolina Panthers	Scott Fitterer		Dan Morgan	Fired	Fitterer was fired on January 8 after three seasons with the team. During his tenure, the Panthers were 14–37 (.275) with no playoff appearances. On January 22, Morgan was promoted from assistant general manager to president of football operation/general manager.
Las Vegas Raiders	Dave Ziegler	Champ Kelly	Tom Telesco	Fired	After a 3–5 start, Ziegler was fired on October 31, 2023, after one and a half seasons with the team. During his tenure, the Raiders were 9–16 (.360) with no playoff appearances. Kelly, the team's assistant general manager, would serve as interim GM for the rest of the season. Telesco, who spent the last 11 seasons as general manager of the Los Angeles Chargers, was hired on January 23.
Los Angeles Chargers	Tom Telesco	JoJo Wooden	Joe Hortiz	Fired	Telesco was fired on December 15, 2023, after 11 seasons with the team. Wooden, the team's director of player personnel, served as interim GM for the rest of the season. Hortiz was hired on January 30. He previously served for the Baltimore Ravens from 1998 to 2023 in various executive roles and as director of player personnel the last five seasons.
New England Patriots	Bill Belichick		Eliot Wolf	Mutual agreement	On January 11, the Patriots and head coach and de facto GM Belichick agreed to part ways after 24 seasons, with executive vice president of player personnel Wolf having final say on personnel decisions.
Washington Commanders	Martin Mayhew		Adam Peters	Reassigned	On January 15, the Commanders hired Peters, assistant GM of the 49ers, as GM. Mayhew was retained and given the title of senior personnel executive and advisor to Peters.

==== In-season ====
Team	Departing GM	Reason for leaving	Interim replacement	Notes
New York Jets	Joe Douglas	Fired	Phil Savage	Douglas was fired on November 19, after six seasons. Savage, the team's senior personnel advisor, was named interim GM. Savage previously served as general manager of the Cleveland Browns from 2005 to 2008.

== Stadiums ==
- On February 28, Washington announced that FedEx ended its naming rights agreement for what was FedExField two years before the scheduled end of the agreement. The team used the temporary name of Commanders Field before announcing a sponsorship with Northwest Federal Credit Union on August 27, in which the stadium was renamed Northwest Stadium.
- On September 3, Cleveland announced a partnership with Huntington Bank in which the former Cleveland Browns Stadium was renamed Huntington Bank Field.

== Uniforms ==
=== Uniform changes ===
- Cincinnati added orange pants into its uniform rotation for the first time in franchise history. The pants were paired with Cincinnati's orange alternate jersey and primary helmet during the team's season opener. The team also wore its new orange pants with the home black and road white jersey twice each.
- Cleveland announced that the team would be returning to white facemasks full time beginning with the 2024 season after featuring them for one game in each of the previous two seasons. Cleveland previously wore white facemasks from 1975 to 2005.
- Denver unveiled new uniforms on April 22—the team's first uniform change since 1997. The primary logo and color scheme were retained. Denver implemented an additional throwback alternate uniform based on the team's 1977 "Orange Crush" design.
- Detroit unveiled new uniforms on April 18. The set features updated block numbers, nameplate typeface, and shoulder striping across all three designs. The color scheme was updated to a brighter shade of the team's "Honolulu blue". A black uniform serves as Detroit's alternate while their throwback uniform was retained as their second alternate.
- Houston revealed four new uniforms on April 23, replacing the set used by the franchise since its inception. A new shade of "H-Town Blue" was incorporated on an alternate design. The original primary logo was retained and a secondary "H" logo was implemented.
- Jacksonville introduced a throwback uniform based on their original 1990s uniform.
- Minnesota unveiled a new alternate "Winter Warrior" set on June 6. The jersey is white with purple numbers accented by a silver outline. The pants are white with purple and silver stripes. It is the first Vikings jersey that does not include gold.
- The New York Giants introduced a throwback design to commemorate the team's 100th season on May 17. The "Century Red" uniforms implement design elements from several of the team's early seasons. This set replaces the throwback-inspired white uniforms first used during the NFL's "Color Rush" program.
- The New York Jets replaced their current designs with a new set that utilizes the team's legacy white throwback as its base template and updated their logos to accommodate the change. Green and black versions of the uniform were unveiled on April 15. The team unveiled "The Classic" on July 22, a design based on their uniforms worn during Super Bowl III.
- Philadelphia added the updated wordmark from 2022 to their uniforms.
- Washington added gold pants to its home uniform for the first time since 2018.

=== Alternate helmets ===
In April 2024, the NFL modified its uniform rule to allow for a third helmet option. The four teams that underwent a re-design process prior to the season, as noted above, have been offered a third helmet option, and it will be available to all teams starting in 2025. These alternate helmets can be paired with a team's throwback or alternate uniform; if it is with the throwback uniform, the helmet colors and designs must be historically compatible.

- Baltimore revealed an alternate "Purple Rising" helmet for their all-purple uniforms. The helmet is purple and features a forward-facing Raven logo with a gold facemask.
- Denver added a third "Legacy Blue" helmet to accompany their throwback uniform.
- Detroit replaced the decals on their Honolulu blue helmet with a black version of the primary team logo and striping. The helmet was accompanied with the team's black alternate uniform.
- Green Bay introduced a white helmet to their all-white uniform configuration.
- Houston's alternate "H-Town Blue" uniform features the team's new "H" secondary logo as its primary helmet decal. The team's red alternate helmet was modified to include new decals that feature the team logo's horns on either side.
- Jacksonville introduced a white alternate helmet, which they announced would be worn for one game.
- Minnesota's "Winter Warrior" uniform features a new white alternate helmet. The helmet's logo outline, stripe and facemask are silver.
- The New York Giants introduced a "Century Red" throwback helmet commemorating their 100th season in existence. It features winged red decals on the team's default blue shell.
- The New York Jets reintroduced its white shell helmet for the aforementioned "The Classic" throwback uniform.

=== Patches ===
- Carolina wore a patch that commemorated the 30th season of the franchise.
- Jacksonville wore a patch that commemorated the 30th season of the franchise.
- Las Vegas wore a patch that commemorated the 65th season of the franchise.
- The New York Giants wore a patch that commemorated the 100th season of the franchise.
- Teams playing on Thanksgiving wore a patch that commemorated former coach and commentator John Madden.

== Media ==
=== National ===
This was the second season under 11-year U.S. media rights agreements with CBS Sports, Fox Sports, NBC Sports, ESPN/ABC, and NFL Network; the third year of a 12-year deal with Amazon Prime Video; and the second season under a seven-year deal with YouTube TV.

Netflix was added as a media partner, signing a three-year deal to exclusively stream at least one Christmas game per season.

==== Linear television ====
- Sunday afternoon games were split between CBS and Fox. Both networks continued to carry the Sunday afternoon AFC and NFC packages, respectively. When the initial schedule was created, CBS and Fox were able to specify a limited number of games involving teams from their respective conference that they want to air, but otherwise the league was free to schedule games regardless of conference. Each network aired ten doubleheaders, with both networks airing one on Weeks 15 and 18. On Thanksgiving, CBS broadcast the early Detroit game and Fox broadcast the late Dallas game. CBS also has the option of producing alternative broadcasts of select games on Nickelodeon.
- NBC continued to air Sunday Night Football, the NFL Kickoff Game, and the primetime Thanksgiving game. NBC also aired an additional Saturday afternoon game on December 21. Due to NBC's coverage of the 2024 Summer Olympics, the 2024 Pro Football Hall of Fame Game was aired as an ESPN/ABC simulcast.
- ESPN continued to produce Monday Night Football and the doubleheader on the last Saturday of the season. Originally, four MNF games and the Saturday doubleheader were set to be ESPN/ABC simulcasts. In October 2024, it was announced that ABC picked up simulcasts of six additional MNF games, bringing the ESPN/ABC simulcast total to twelve. Three weeks featured two MNF games split between ABC and ESPN. In April 2024, ESPN signed a contract extension with Omaha Productions to produce the alternative Monday Night Football with Peyton and Eli on ESPN2 through 2034.
- NFL Network aired four International Series and three late-season Saturday games.

==== Streaming ====
- Amazon Prime Video and Twitch exclusively streamed Thursday Night Football, and the game on the Friday after Thanksgiving under the title Black Friday Football.
- Peacock simulcast NBC's games. NBC also carries one exclusive national game on Peacock per-season, in this case being the São Paulo, Brazil game on September 6. Peacock streamed an alternate broadcast of NBC's Saturday December 21 game that used the league's player tracking data to render a live version of the game using elements of the Madden 25 video game.
- ESPN+ simulcast select games on ABC, including games being simulcast on ESPN, as well as select Manningcast telecasts. The platform also exclusively streamed the second game of a split Monday Night Football doubleheader on October 21 with ABC and ESPN airing the other game. On December 9, ESPN+ and Disney+ streamed The Simpsons Funday Football, an alternate Monday Night Football broadcast that used the league's player tracking data to render a live animated version of the game portrayed by characters from The Simpsons.
- Paramount+ simulcast in market and national CBS games.
- Netflix streamed two Christmas games.
- The NFL Sunday Ticket out-of-market sports package streamed on YouTube TV, as well as on YouTube Primetime Channels service as a standalone subscription option.
- The league's streaming service NFL+ continued to stream in-market regular season and postseason games on mobile devices only, radio broadcasts for all games, most out-of-market preseason games and a live stream of NFL Network on its base tier, and replays of games along with NFL RedZone on its premium tier.

==== Postseason ====
All four broadcast partners aired at least one Wild Card round game, with CBS and Fox airing an AFC and NFC Wild Card game, respectively. NBC aired the Sunday night game under the fourth year of its seven-year deal. ESPN/ABC broadcast the Monday night Wild Card game, its fourth in a five-year deal. CBS aired a second game in the wild card round as part of its rotation with Fox and NBC; one of CBS' Wild Card games had an alternative broadcast on Nickelodeon.

Amazon Prime Video exclusively aired a Wild Card playoff game for the first time during the 2024 season (it previously simulcast one CBS Wild Card playoff games on the platform in the 2021 and 2022 seasons), purchasing the rights to the game that was aired exclusively by Peacock last season.

This was the second season that all four broadcast television partners aired one divisional playoff game per season (ESPN/ABC, Fox, CBS, and NBC).

Fox televised Super Bowl LIX in the annual rotation of Super Bowl broadcasters.

==== Personnel changes ====
Tom Brady began his broadcasting career as Fox's lead color commentator, working alongside Kevin Burkhardt. Brady replaced Greg Olsen, who joined Joe Davis on the #2 team. Other changes saw Daryl Johnston move to the #5 team with Kevin Kugler, Mark Sanchez joining Adam Amin on the #3 team, and Mark Schlereth assigned to the #6 team with Chris Myers. The #4 team of Kenny Albert and Jonathan Vilma remained intact, with Megan Olivi replacing Shannon Spake as that team's sideline reporter.

Longtime CBS analysts Phil Simms and Boomer Esiason departed The NFL Today after 26 and 22 years, respectively. They were replaced by J. J. Watt and Matt Ryan. Ryan, who previously worked with Andrew Catalon and Tiki Barber on the #4 team, was replaced by Jason McCourty on that team.
