= List of NFL career tackles leaders =

In American football, a tackle is when a defensive player forces the player with the ball to the ground or out of bounds to stop the runner from advancing downfield and to end the play. This is a list of National Football League (NFL) players with the most combined tackles in their careers and players with the most solo tackles in their careers. Tackles are not an official stat recorded by the NFL and are tracked by a scorekeeper of the home team. Pro Football Reference has combined tackle numbers dating back to the 1978 season and solo tackle numbers back to the 1994 season. However, combined tackle numbers before the 1987 season are incomplete and limited to few players.

Ray Lewis is the current all-time leader of both combined tackles and solo tackles with 2,059 and 1,568. Demario Davis is the leader of active players for both combined tackles and solo tackles with 1,604 and 988.

== Career combined tackles leaders ==
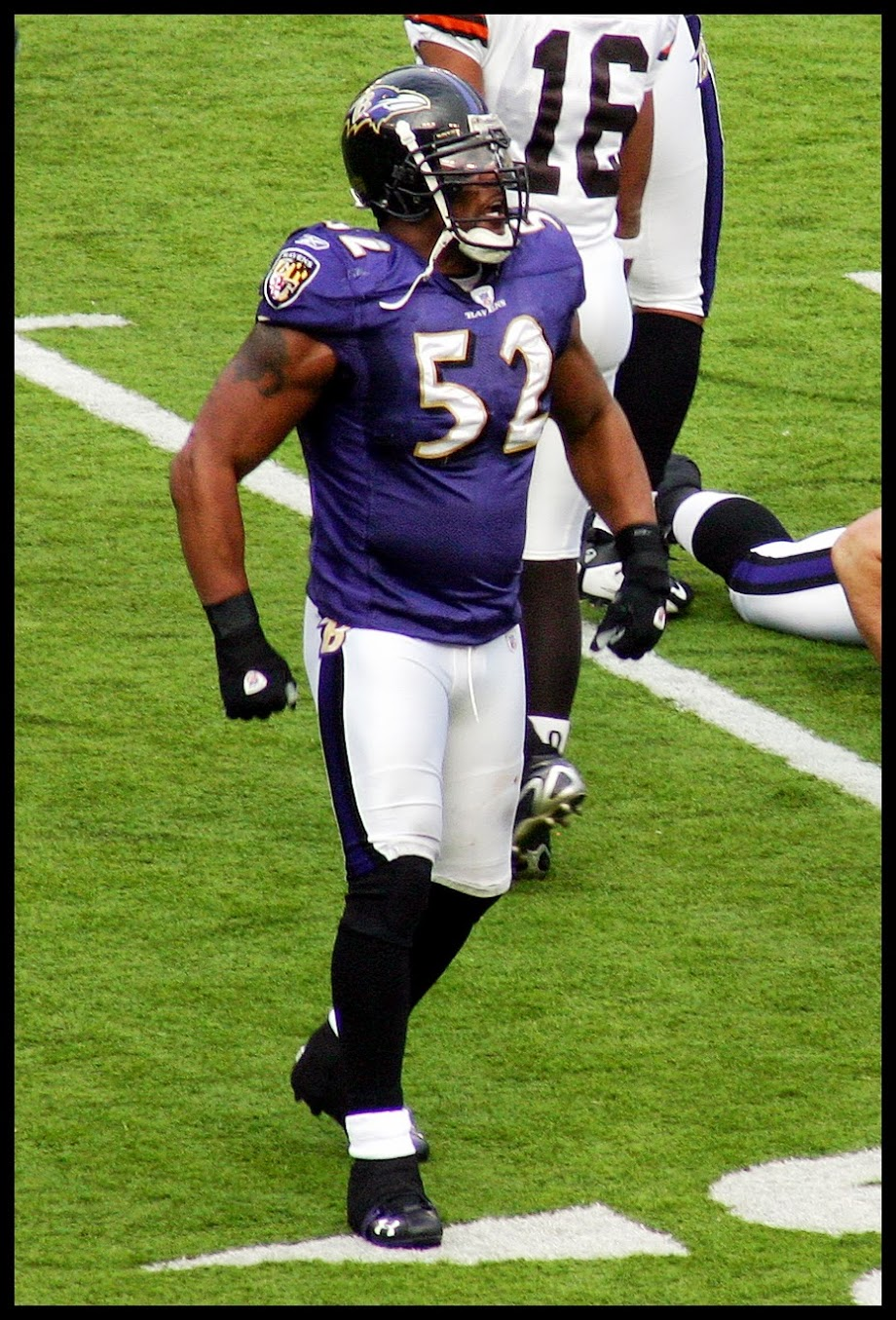
Ray Lewis has the most combined and solo tackles in NFL history.

Key
Symbol	Meaning
†	Inducted into the Pro Football Hall of Fame
^	Active player

Updated through Week 10 of the 2026 NFL season.

List of career NFL combined tackle leaders
Rank	Pos.	Player	Combined tackles	Career	Ref.
1	LB	Ray Lewis^{†}	2,059	Baltimore Ravens (1996–2012)	
2	LB	London Fletcher	2,039	St. Louis Rams (1998–2001); Buffalo Bills (2002–2006); Washington Redskins (2007–2013)	
3	LB	Bobby Wagner	2,000	Seattle Seahawks (2012–2021); Los Angeles Rams (2022); Seattle Seahawks (2023); Washington Commanders (2024–2025)	
4	LB	Junior Seau^{†}	1,847	San Diego Chargers (1990–2002); Miami Dolphins (2003–2005); New England Patriots (2006–2009)	
5	LB	Jessie Tuggle	1,805	Atlanta Falcons (1987–2000)	
6	LB	Zach Thomas^{†}	1,734	Miami Dolphins (1996–2007); Dallas Cowboys (2008)	
7	LB	Lavonte David	1,716	Tampa Bay Buccaneers (2012–2025)	
8	LB	Derrick Brooks^{†}	1,713	Tampa Bay Buccaneers (1995–2008)	
9	LB	Demario Davis^{^}	1,604	New York Jets (2012–2015); Cleveland Browns (2016); New York Jets (2017); New Orleans Saints (2018–2025); New York Jets (2026–present)	
10	LB	Clay Matthews Jr.	1,595	Cleveland Browns (1978–1993); Atlanta Falcons (1994–1996)	
11	LB	Hardy Nickerson	1,586	Pittsburgh Steelers (1987–1992); Tampa Bay Buccaneers (1993–1999); Jacksonville Jaguars (2000–2001); Green Bay Packers (2002)	
12	LB	Donnie Edwards	1,501	Kansas City Chiefs (1996–2001); San Diego Chargers (2002–2006); Kansas City Chiefs (2007–2008)	
13	LB	Kyle Clifton	1,484	New York Jets (1984–1996)	
14	LB	Keith Brooking	1,440	Atlanta Falcons (1998–2008); Dallas Cowboys (2009–2011); Denver Broncos (2012)	
14	LB	James Farrior	1,440	New York Jets (1997–2001); Pittsburgh Steelers (2002–2011)	
16	S	Lawyer Milloy	1,439	New England Patriots (1996–2002); Buffalo Bills (2003–2005); Atlanta Falcons (2006–2008); Seattle Seahawks (2009–2010)	
17	LB	Takeo Spikes	1,431	Cincinnati Bengals (1998–2002); Buffalo Bills (2003–2006); Philadelphia Eagles (2007); San Francisco 49ers (2008–2010); San Diego Chargers (2011–2012)	
18	LB	Karlos Dansby	1,422	Arizona Cardinals (2004–2009); Miami Dolphins (2010–2012); Arizona Cardinals (2013); Cleveland Browns (2014–2015); Cincinnati Bengals (2016); Arizona Cardinals (2017)	
19	S	Eugene Robinson	1,413	Seattle Seahawks (1985–1995); Green Bay Packers (1996–1997); Atlanta Falcons (1998–1999); Carolina Panthers (2000)	
20	LB	Chris Spielman	1,363	Detroit Lions (1988–1995); Buffalo Bills (1996–1997)	
21	LB	Brian Urlacher^{†}	1,361	Chicago Bears (2000–2012)	
22	S	Antoine Bethea	1,333	Indianapolis Colts (2006–2013); San Francisco 49ers (2014–2016); Arizona Cardinals (2017–2018); New York Giants (2019)	
23	LB	Ken Norton Jr.	1,272	Dallas Cowboys (1988–1993); San Francisco 49ers (1994–2000)	
24	LB	Sam Mills^{†}	1,265	New Orleans Saints (1986–1994); Carolina Panthers (1995–1997)	
25	LB	Darryl Talley	1,252	Buffalo Bills (1983–1994); Atlanta Falcons (1995); Minnesota Vikings (1996)	

== Career solo tackles leaders ==
Key
Symbol	Meaning
†	Inducted into the Pro Football Hall of Fame
^	Active player

Updated through Week 10 of the 2026 NFL season.

List of career NFL solo tackle leaders
Rank	Pos.	Player	Solo tackles	Career	Ref.
1	LB	Ray Lewis^{†}	1,568	Baltimore Ravens (1996–2012)	
2	LB	London Fletcher	1,384	St. Louis Rams (1998–2001); Buffalo Bills (2002–2006); Washington Redskins (2007–2013)	
3	LB	Derrick Brooks^{†}	1,300	Tampa Bay Buccaneers (1995–2008)	
4	LB	Lavonte David	1,172	Tampa Bay Buccaneers (2012–2025)	
5	LB	Bobby Wagner	1,150	Seattle Seahawks (2012–2021); Los Angeles Rams (2022); Seattle Seahawks (2023); Washington Commanders (2024–2025)	
6	LB	Donnie Edwards	1,135	Kansas City Chiefs (1996–2001); San Diego Chargers (2002–2006); Kansas City Chiefs (2007–2008)	
7	LB	Zach Thomas^{†}	1,107	Miami Dolphins (1996–2007); Dallas Cowboys (2008)	
8	LB	Keith Brooking	1,103	Atlanta Falcons (1998–2008); Dallas Cowboys (2009–2011); Denver Broncos (2012)	
9	LB	Karlos Dansby	1,077	Arizona Cardinals (2004–2009); Miami Dolphins (2010–2012); Arizona Cardinals (2013); Cleveland Browns (2014–2015); Cincinnati Bengals (2016); Arizona Cardinals (2017)	
9	LB	Junior Seau^{†}	1,077	San Diego Chargers (1990–2002); Miami Dolphins (2003–2005); New England Patriots (2006–2009)	
11	LB	Brian Urlacher^{†}	1,046	Chicago Bears (2000–2012)	
12	CB	Ronde Barber^{†}	1,044	Tampa Bay Buccaneers (1997–2012)	
13	S	Lawyer Milloy	1,033	New England Patriots (1996–2002); Buffalo Bills (2003–2005); Atlanta Falcons (2006–2008); Seattle Seahawks (2009–2010)	
14	LB	Takeo Spikes	1,018	Cincinnati Bengals (1998–2002); Buffalo Bills (2003–2006); Philadelphia Eagles (2007); San Francisco 49ers (2008–2010); San Diego Chargers (2011–2012)	
15	LB	James Farrior	1,012	New York Jets (1997–2001); Pittsburgh Steelers (2002–2011)	
16	CB	Charles Woodson^{†}	997	Oakland Raiders (1998–2005); Green Bay Packers (2006–2012); Oakland Raiders (2013–2015)	
17	S	Antoine Bethea	995	Indianapolis Colts (2006–2013); San Francisco 49ers (2014–2016); Arizona Cardinals (2017–2018); New York Giants (2019)	
18	LB	Demario Davis^{^}	988	New York Jets (2012–2015); Cleveland Browns (2016); New York Jets (2017); New Orleans Saints (2018–2025); New York Jets (2026–present)	
19	LB	Derrick Johnson	955	Kansas City Chiefs (2005–2017); Oakland Raiders (2018)	
20	LB	Lance Briggs	944	Chicago Bears (2003–2014)	
21	CB	Antoine Winfield Sr.	935	Buffalo Bills (1999–2003); Minnesota Vikings (2004–2012)	
22	S	Rodney Harrison	920	San Diego Chargers (1994–2002); New England Patriots (2003–2008)	
23	S	Brian Dawkins^{†}	911	Philadelphia Eagles (1996–2008); Denver Broncos (2009–2011)	
24	S	Eric Weddle	903	San Diego Chargers (2007–2015); Baltimore Ravens (2016–2018); Los Angeles Rams (2019, 2021)	
25	LB	Mike Peterson	896	Indianapolis Colts (1999–2002); Jacksonville Jaguars (2003–2008); Atlanta Falcons (2009–2012)	

== See also ==
- List of NFL annual tackles leaders
