= 1997 Atlanta Falcons season =

32nd season in franchise history; final one under ownership of Rankin Smith

- Owner: Rankin Smith (died on October 26, 1997)
- Head coach: Dan Reeves
- Offensive coordinator: George Sefcik
- Defensive coordinator: Rich Brooks
- Home stadium: Georgia Dome

Results
- Record: 7–9
- Division place: 3rd NFC West
- Playoffs: Did not qualify
- Pro Bowlers: QB Chris Chandler; MLB Jessie Tuggle

The 1997 Atlanta Falcons season was the franchise's 32nd season in the National Football League (NFL). It was their first season with new head coach Dan Reeves, who had been hired on January 21.

For the season, they added a new logo and added the numerals and socks on the road jerseys are switched from black to red.

The season was marked with tragedy, as team owner Rankin Smith died on October 26, 1997. The following week, the team wore a commemorative patch on their jerseys for the remainder of the season. The season was the last time Falcons started 0–5 until 2020.

== Offseason ==
=== NFL draft ===
1997 Atlanta Falcons draft
Round	Pick	Player	Position	College	Notes
1	11	Michael Booker	Cornerback	Nebraska	
2	32	Nathan Davis	Defensive end	Indiana	
2	41	Byron Hanspard	Running back	Texas Tech	
3	70	O. J. Santiago	Tight end	Kent State	
4	100	Henri Crockett	Linebacker	Florida State	
5	133	Marcus Wimberly	Defensive back	Miami (FL)	
6	180	Calvin Collins	Guard	Texas A&M	
7	204	Tony Graziani	Quarterback	Oregon	
7	222	Chris Bayne	Safety	Fresno State	
Made roster

== Personnel ==
=== Staff ===
1997 Atlanta Falcons staff
Front office: President – Taylor Smith; Executive vice president of football operations – Dan Reeves; Director of player personnel/college – Reed Johnson; Director of player personnel/pro – Chuck Connor; Assistant to head coach/pro personnel – Marvin Bass; Head coaches: Head coach – Dan Reeves; Assistant head coach – Rich Brooks; Assistant head coach/football operations – Harold Richardson; Offensive coaches: Offensive coordinator/running backs – George Sefcik; Quarterbacks – Jack Burns; Wide receivers – Rennie Simmons; Tight ends – James Daniel; Offensive line – Art Shell; Offensive quality control – Pete Mangurian	Defensive coaches: Defensive coordinator – Rich Brooks; Defensive line – Bill Kollar; Linebackers – Don Blackmon; Secondary – Ron Meeks; Defensive quality control – Brian Xanders; Special teams coaches: Special teams – Joe DeCamillis; Strength and conditioning: Strength and conditioning – Al Miller; Assistant strength and conditioning – Tim Jorgensen

=== Roster ===
1997 Atlanta Falcons roster
Quarterbacks (QB): 12 Chris Chandler; 13 Tony Graziani; 15 Jim Miller; Running backs (RB): 32 Jamal Anderson; 44 Bob Christian FB; 45 Gary Downs; 28 Harold Green; 24 Byron Hanspard; Wide receivers (WR): 87 Bert Emanuel; 84 Mercury Hayes; 82 Michael Haynes; 89 Todd Kinchen; 81 Terance Mathis; Tight ends (TE): 85 Brian Kozlowski; 49 Brian Saxton; 86 Ed Smith	Offensive linemen (OL): 71 Scott Adams G; 68 Calvin Collins C; 76 Antone Davis T; 65 Roman Fortin C; 55 Nate Miller T; 61 Robbie Tobeck G; 70 Bob Whitfield T; 69 Gene Williams G; 77 Matt Willig T; Defensive linemen (DL): 92 Lester Archambeau DE; 91 John Burrough DE; 99 Nathan Davis DT; 75 Shane Dronett DT; 98 Travis Hall DT; 93 Dan Owens DT; 96 Anthony Pleasant DE; 90 Chuck Smith DE	Linebackers (LB): 97 Cornelius Bennett OLB; 94 Henri Crockett OLB; 53 Jamal Fountaine OLB; 54 Ruffin Hamilton OLB; 52 Craig Sauer OLB; 50 Eddie Sutter MLB; 58 Jessie Tuggle MLB; Defensive backs (DB): 47 Chris Bayne SS; 43 Juran Bolden CB; 20 Michael Booker CB; 23 Ronnie Bradford CB; 34 Ray Buchanan CB; 25 Devin Bush FS; 22 Lenny McGill CB; 35 William White SS; 48 Marcus Wimberly FS; Special teams (ST): 5 Morten Andersen K; 3 Scott Bentley K; 67 Adam Schreiber LS; 4 Dan Stryzinski P	Practice squad: 66 Jeremy Akers T; 21 Tim Denton CB; 73 Barry Mitchell DE; 19 Kevin Thornal WR; 53 active, 4 inactive, 4 practice squad Reserve: 51 David Brandon LB (IR); 36 Fred Lester RB (IR); 88 O. J. Santiago TE (IR); 83 Ed West TE (IR); Rookies in italics

== Regular season ==
=== Schedule ===
Week	Date	Opponent	Result	Record	Venue	Recap
1	August 31	at Detroit Lions	**L** 17–28	0–1	Pontiac Silverdome	Recap
2	September 7	**Carolina Panthers**	**L** 6–9	0–2	Georgia Dome	Recap
3	September 14	Oakland Raiders	**L** 31–36	0–3	Georgia Dome	Recap
4	September 21	at **San Francisco 49ers**	**L** 7–34	0–4	3Com Park	Recap
5	September 28	Denver Broncos	**L** 21–29	0–5	Georgia Dome	Recap
6	Bye					
7	October 12	at **New Orleans Saints**	**W** 23–17	1–5	Louisiana Superdome	Recap
8	October 19	**San Francisco 49ers**	**L** 28–35	1–6	Georgia Dome	Recap
9	October 26	at **Carolina Panthers**	**L** 12–21	1–7	Ericsson Stadium	Recap
10	November 2	**St. Louis Rams**	**W** 34–31	2–7	Georgia Dome	Recap
11	November 9	Tampa Bay Buccaneers	**L** 10–31	2–8	Georgia Dome	Recap
12	November 16	at **St. Louis Rams**	**W** 27–21	3–8	Trans World Dome	Recap
13	November 23	**New Orleans Saints**	**W** 20–3	4–8	Georgia Dome	Recap
14	November 30	at Seattle Seahawks	**W** 24–17	5–8	Kingdome	Recap
15	December 7	at San Diego Chargers	**W** 14–3	6–8	Qualcomm Stadium	Recap
16	December 14	Philadelphia Eagles	**W** 20–17	7–8	Georgia Dome	Recap
17	December 21	at Arizona Cardinals	**L** 26–29	7–9	Sun Devil Stadium	Recap
Note: Intra-division opponents are in **bold** text.

== Season summary ==
=== Week 7 at Saints ===
Week Seven: Atlanta Falcons (0–5) at New Orleans Saints (2–4)

Quarter	1	2	3	4	Total
Falcons	10	6	7	0	23
Saints	0	3	0	14	17

at Louisiana Superdome • New Orleans, Louisiana

- Date: October 12
- Game time: 1:00 p.m. EDT
- Game weather: Indoors (dome)
- Game attendance: 65,619
- Pro-Football-Reference.com, The Football Database

Game information

Falcons

- Chris Chandler
  10/22, 117 Yds, TD
- Jamal Anderson
  21 Rush, 62 Yds, TD
- Bert Emanuel
  3 Rec, 40 Yds, TD

Saints

- Danny Wuerffel
  9/13, 120 Yds, TD, INT
- Mario Bates
  15 Rush, 31 Yds, TD
- Andre Hastings
  4 Rec, 96 Yds, TD

Scoring summary

Quarter	Time	Drive			Team	Scoring information	Score	
Quarter	Time	Plays	Yards	TOP	Team	Scoring information	ATL	NO
1	2:49	10	37		Falcons	25-yard field goal by Morten Andersen	3	0
1	1:45	2	12		Falcons	Bert Emanuel 9-yard touchdown reception from Chris Chandler, Morten Andersen kick good	10	0
2	8:45	12	45		Saints	35-yard field goal by Doug Brien	10	3
2	2:15	8	12		Falcons	32-yard field goal by Morten Andersen	13	3
2	0:00	1	18		Falcons	55-yard field goal by Morten Andersen	16	3
3	12:46	2	6		Falcons	Jamal Anderson 2-yard touchdown run, Morten Andersen kick good	23	3
4	14:55	2	30		Saints	Andre Hastings 16-yard touchdown reception from Danny Wuerffel, Doug Brien kick good	23	10
4	11:30	6	20		Saints	Mario Bates 1-yard touchdown run, Doug Brien kick good	23	17
"TOP" = time of possession. For other American football terms, see Glossary of American football.							23	17

=== Standings ===
NFC West
	W	L	T	PCT	PF	PA	STK
^{(1)} San Francisco 49ers	13	3	0	.813	375	265	L1
Carolina Panthers	7	9	0	.438	265	314	L2
Atlanta Falcons	7	9	0	.438	320	361	L1
New Orleans Saints	6	10	0	.375	237	327	L1
St. Louis Rams	5	11	0	.313	299	359	W1
