= Daniel Neil =

Daniel Neil is the name of:

- Dan Neil (American football), offensive lineman for the Denver Broncos
- Dan Neil (footballer), English footballer for Sunderland
- Dan Neil (journalist), American journalist

== See also ==
- Dan Neal, offensive line for the Baltimore Colts and the Chicago Bears
- Dan Neal (Big Brother), British reality TV star
