= Bryant Westbrook =

American football player (born 1974)

No. 32, 30
- Position: Cornerback

Personal information
- Born: December 19, 1974 (age 51); Charlotte, North Carolina, U.S.
- Listed height: 6 ft 0 in (1.83 m)
- Listed weight: 199 lb (90 kg)

Career information
- High school: El Camino (CA)
- College: Texas
- NFL draft: 1997: 1st round, 5th overall pick

Career history
- Detroit Lions (1997–2001); Dallas Cowboys (2002); Green Bay Packers (2002–2003)

Awards and highlights
- PFWA All-Rookie Team (1997); Second-team All-American (1996); First-team All-Big 12 (1996); Second-team All-SWC (1995)

Career NFL statistics
- Tackles: 234
- Interceptions: 13
- Touchdowns: 3
- Stats at Pro Football Reference

Bryant Antoine Westbrook (born December 19, 1974) is an American former professional football player who was a cornerback in the National Football League (NFL). He played college football for the University of Texas.

== Early life ==
Westbrook attended El Camino High School, where he was a three-year starter at defensive back, while helping his team to 2 county titles.

As a senior, he registered 41 tackles, 4 forced fumbles and 2 interceptions. He also rushed for 676 yards (7 yard-avg.) with 5 touchdowns in the first 7 games, before switching to wide receiver for the final 5 contests, making 25 receptions for 423 yards. He received Parade All-American and North County Defensive Player of the Year honors. He also practiced basketball. Bryant Westbrook was also scouted for basketball as well.

== College career ==
Westbrook played college football at the University of Texas at Austin, where he was named the starting right cornerback midway through his freshman season, tallying 39 tackles, 7 passes defensed and 2 interceptions. The next year, he was moved to the left side after the fifth game, making 30 tackles, 3 passes defensed and 4 interceptions.

As a junior, he recorded 62 tackles (47 solos), 9 passes defensed, 1 interception and 3 forced fumbles. In his final season, he posted 52 tackles, 11 passes defensed, 2 interceptions, 3 forced fumbles and 2 blocked kicks.

Westbrook was known for making powerful tackles that would intimidate his opponents. One such moment occurred in the 1995 rivalry game against Texas A&M when Westbrook landed a devastating hit on Aggies running back Leeland McElroy. It caused color analyst Dick Vermeil to yell "Holy mackerel! Whoo!" Westbrook picked up an unsportsmanlike conduct call for taunting because he strutted next to a stunned McElroy and looked down at McElroy as he walked by. The broadcast team calling the game did not like the call. When Vermeil learned the referee called the play taunting, Vermeil responded by saying "just shoot the official." Ultimately, the play was not a factor in the game's outcome or even that drive. The penalty did not result in a first down since the Aggies were inside the 15-yard line. Half the distance to the goal line was not enough yardage for a first down. The Aggies were forced to bring out their field goal unit.

Westbrook is also known for a brutal hit against Notre Dame in 1996. In the play, Irish QB Ron Powlus pitched the ball out to TB Randy Kinder on the option. Unfortunately for Kinder, Westbrook read the play perfectly and had a full head of steam when the ball got to the tailback Kinder. The ensuing hit caused legendary college football announcer Keith Jackson to instantly say "Uh oh! Hello! Bryant Westbrook!" then fall silent for 10 seconds. Then he said, "The important thing right now is to make sure Randy Kinder can find a place to lay down... 'cause he really took a hit."

In yet another memorable instance of his powerful hits, in the 1995 Sugar Bowl, Westbrook "laid the lumber" to FB Brian Edmonds of Virginia Tech, knocking him unconscious. The hit caused ABC announcer Mark Jones to say, "Somebody answer the phone, because there's a bell ringing, and it's Bryant Westbrook." Then later after some replays and analysis of the play, he further commented about Edmonds, “When he comes to, his clothes will be out of style.”

== Professional career ==
Pre-draft measurables
Height	Weight	Arm length	Hand span
5 ft 11 3/4 in (1.82 m)	199 lb (90 kg)	33 1/4 in (0.84 m)	9 5/8 in (0.24 m)
All values from NFL Combine

=== Detroit Lions ===
Westbrook was selected in the first round (fifth overall) of the 1997 NFL draft by the Detroit Lions. As a rookie, he returned his first career interception for a touchdown and led the Lions with 20 passes defended, while making 54 tackles, 2 interceptions and a forced fumble. After the season, Westbrook was named to the USA Today All-Rookie team.

The next year, he was moved to the left side, recording a career-high 77 tackles, to go along with 19 passes defensed (led the team) and 3 interceptions. In 1999, he was limited with hamstring injuries and a broken bone in his hand, appearing in 10 games, while posting with 34 tackles and 6 passes defensed.

In 2000, he was having his best season as a professional, until suffering a ruptured left Achilles tendon against the Minnesota Vikings and being placed on the injured reserve list on December 4. Despite the premature ending of his season, he registered 52 tackles (43 solo), a career-high 6 interceptions and led team with a career-high of 21 passes defensed. He also was named a Pro Bowl alternate and earned the Chuck Hughes Most Improved Player award, as voted by teammates.

In 2001, he returned to play in ten games, making his first start on December 16 against the Vikings. He was not re-signed at the end of the year, after not being able to regain his previous form.

=== Dallas Cowboys ===
On March 22, 2002, he signed with the Dallas Cowboys as an unrestricted free agent. He passed Duane Hawthorne on the depth chart and was named the starter at left cornerback for the season opener against the Houston Texans, who at the time were an expansion team, playing in their first game ever. Westbrook was charged with a 43-yard pass interference penalty on Houston's first play from scrimmage, which led to a touchdown. He continued to be targeted by the Texans during the contest and in the fourth quarter, a sack of quarterback David Carr was cancelled because Westbrook was called with a 5-yard penalty for illegal contact, leading to the final touchdown of a 19–10 loss. On September 12, he was cut due to his poor play in the season opener.

=== Green Bay Packers ===
On October 9, 2002, he was signed by the Green Bay Packers as a free agent for depth purposes, after injuries to Mike McKenzie and Darren Sharper. The next season, he was tried at safety, before rupturing his right Achilles tendon and being placed on the injured reserve list on August 17, 2003. He was released on May 6, 2004.

=== NFL statistics ===
Year	Team	GP	Tackles				Fumbles		Interceptions					
Year	Team	GP	Comb	Solo	Ast	Sack	FF	FR	Int	Yds	Avg	Lng	TD	PD
1997	DET	15	44	41	3	0.0	0	0	2	64	32.0	64	1	21
1998	DET	16	73	59	14	0.0	0	0	3	49	16.3	34	1	21
1999	DET	10	34	31	3	0.0	1	1	0	0	0.0	0	0	5
2000	DET	13	49	36	13	0.0	0	0	6	126	21.0	101	1	19
2001	DET	10	20	19	1	0.0	0	0	1	0	0.0	0	0	4
2002	DAL	1	3	3	0	0.0	0	0	0	0	0.0	0	0	2
2002	GB	6	7	7	0	0.0	0	0	1	0	0.0	0	0	1
Career		71	230	196	34	0.0	1	1	13	239	18.4	101	3	73

== Personal life ==
In January 2011, Westbrook was the defensive back coach at Shadow Mountain High School in Phoenix, Arizona. In 2012, he was the defensive back coach at Cactus High School in Glendale. He is currently an assistant football coach at perennial Arizona powerhouse Saguaro High School. Currently a defensive back coach Brophy College Preparatory.
