= 1997 New York Jets season =

1997 season of NFL team New York Jets

- Owner: Leon Hess
- Head coach: Bill Parcells
- Offensive coordinator: Charlie Weis
- Defensive coordinator: Bill Belichick
- Home stadium: Giants Stadium

Results
- Record: 9–7
- Division place: 3rd AFC East
- Playoffs: Did not qualify
- Pro Bowlers: LB Mo Lewis

The 1997 New York Jets season was the franchise's 28th season in the National Football League (NFL) and the 38th overall. Sparked by the arrival of head coach Bill Parcells, who replaced Rich Kotite, and was coming off a Super Bowl berth the previous season, they improved upon its league-worst and franchise-worst 1–15 record from 1996 finishing at 9–7, but narrowly missed the playoffs after losing their final game of the season. It was their first winning season since 1988 when they finished with an 8–7–1 record.

== Offseason ==
For most of the end of the 1996 season, the Jets were courting Parcells to take over their football operations. This drew criticism from the team that employed Parcells at the time, the New England Patriots, who were in the middle of a push that eventually led to a loss in Super Bowl XXXI. Parcells made a now-famous statement regarding the Patriots’ unwillingness to give him more of a say in football matters: "If they want you to cook the dinner, at least they ought to let you shop for some of the groceries."

Parcells eventually announced his resignation but was bound by the terms of his contract with the Patriots, which forbade him from coaching anywhere else until the contract expired. To temporarily resolve the situation the Jets hired Bill Belichick, Parcells’ top assistant, to be the coach and hired Parcells for an advisory role. The Patriots were unamused, and complained to the league. Eventually commissioner Paul Tagliabue brokered a deal with the two teams where Parcells would be able to coach the Jets and the Patriots would receive the Jets' first round draft pick the next year. This allowed the Jets to avoid sending the number-one overall pick in the 1997 NFL draft, which they had earned from their 1–15 finish, to the Patriots. New England had initially demanded that first pick in order to permit Parcells to move to the Jets.

In regards to that pick, two players were on the Jets’ radar. One was Ohio State offensive tackle Orlando Pace, who was coming out of school a year early. The other was Tennessee quarterback Peyton Manning, who had graduated from school in three years but still had a year of eligibility left, yet was expected by many to come out for the draft. Manning announced he would return to Tennessee for his senior season. Because the Jets already possessed two established free agent offensive tackles in David Williams and Jumbo Elliott and had much greater needs elsewhere, their #1 pick destined for Pace was traded to the St. Louis Rams. The Jets instead drafted Virginia linebacker James Farrior.

=== NFL draft ===
1997 New York Jets draft
Round	Pick	Player	Position	College	Notes
1	8	James Farrior *	LB	Virginia	from Tampa Bay
2	31	Rick Terry	DT	North Carolina	
3	88	Dedric Ward	WR	Northern Iowa	from Denver
4	102	Terry Day	DE	Mississippi State	from St. Louis
4	104	Leon Johnson	RB	North Carolina	from Tampa Bay
5	131	Lamont Burns	G	East Carolina	
5	145	Ray Austin	SS	Tennessee	from Miami
6	164	Tim Scharf	LB	Northwestern	
6	191	Chuck Clements	QB	Houston	from Denver
7	202	Steve Rosga	DB	Colorado	
7	229	Jason Ferguson	DT	Georgia	from Denver
Made roster * Made at least one Pro Bowl during career

== Roster ==
1997 New York Jets roster
Quarterbacks (QB): 7 Chuck Clements; 4 Glenn Foley; 18 Ray Lucas; 14 Neil O'Donnell; Running backs (RB): 20 Richie Anderson; 32 Leon Johnson; 29 Adrian Murrell; 22 Lorenzo Neal FB; 27 Jerald Sowell FB; Wide receivers (WR): 80 Wayne Chrebet; 81 Jeff Graham; 19 Keyshawn Johnson; 86 Alex Van Dyke; 89 Dedric Ward; Tight ends (TE): 84 Fred Baxter; 88 Kyle Brady; 85 John Burke	Offensive linemen (OL): 68 Lamont Burns G; 64 J. R. Conrad C; 62 Roger Duffy C; 77 Jay Hagood T; 71 Kerry Jenkins T; 75 Siupeli Malamala T; 70 Matt O'Dwyer G; 66 Lonnie Palelei G; 79 Deron Thorp T; 73 David Williams T; Defensive linemen (DL): 78 Terry Day DE; 98 Ronnie Dixon NT; 99 Hugh Douglas DE; 72 Jason Ferguson NT; 92 Bobby Hamilton DE; 95 Rick Lyle DE; 94 Rick Terry NT	Linebackers (LB): 53 Chad Cascadden OLB; 58 James Farrior OLB; 51 Matt Finkes OLB; 54 Dwayne Gordon ILB; 55 Marvin Jones ILB; 57 Mo Lewis OLB; Defensive backs (DB): 25 Ray Austin SS; 44 Corwin Brown SS; 42 Marcus Coleman FS; 31 Aaron Glenn CB; 21 Victor Green SS; 30 Chris Hayes SS; 26 Jerome Henderson FS; 36 Anthony Marshall FS; 24 Ray Mickens CB; 45 Otis Smith CB; Special teams (ST): 9 John Hall K; 11 Brian Hansen P; 65 John Hudson LS	Practice squad: 3 Nick Gallery P; 33 Robert Farmer RB; 50 Craig Guest LB; 15 Alonzo Johnson WR; 56 Chris Wing LB; Reserve: 76 Jumbo Elliott T (IR); 52 Pepper Johnson LB (IR); 93 Ernie Logan NT (IR); 69 William Roberts G (IR); Rookies in italics 53 active, 4 reserve, 5 practice squad

== Regular season ==
=== Schedule ===
Week	Date	Opponent	Result	Record	Venue	Attendance
1	August 31	at Seattle Seahawks	**W** 41–3	1–0	Kingdome	53,893
2	September 7	**Buffalo Bills**	**L** 22–28	1–1	Giants Stadium	72,988
3	September 14	at **New England Patriots**	**L** 24–27 (OT)	1–2	Foxboro Stadium	60,072
4	September 21	Oakland Raiders	**W** 23–22	2–2	Giants Stadium	72,586
5	September 28	at Cincinnati Bengals	**W** 31–14	3–2	Cinergy Field	57,209
6	October 5	at **Indianapolis Colts**	**W** 16–12	4–2	RCA Dome	48,295
7	October 12	**Miami Dolphins**	**L** 20–31	4–3	Giants Stadium	75,601
8	October 19	**New England Patriots**	**W** 24–19	5–3	Giants Stadium	71,061
9	Bye					
10	November 2	Baltimore Ravens	**W** 19–16 (OT)	6–3	Giants Stadium	59,524
11	November 9	at **Miami Dolphins**	**L** 17–24	6–4	Pro Player Stadium	73,809
12	November 16	at Chicago Bears	**W** 23–15	7–4	Soldier Field	45,642
13	November 23	Minnesota Vikings	**W** 23–21	8–4	Giants Stadium	70,131
14	November 30	at **Buffalo Bills**	**L** 10–20	8–5	Rich Stadium	47,776
15	December 7	**Indianapolis Colts**	**L** 14–22	8–6	Giants Stadium	61,168
16	December 14	Tampa Bay Buccaneers	**W** 31–0	9–6	Giants Stadium	60,122
17	December 21	at Detroit Lions	**L** 10–13	9–7	Pontiac Silverdome	77,624
Note: Intra-division games are in **bold** text

=== Notable Games ===
- August 31 @ Seattle Seahawks

The new-look Jets erupted in their first game under Bill Parcells. Neil O'Donnell threw three first-half touchdowns while rookie John Hall booted a 55-yard field goal and later a 28-yarder. Despite leading 27–3 at the half, Parcells forcefully reminded them, “They say you can't hold a lead. They say you blew six games last year where you were leading at the half. Let’s see what you’re made of.” The Jets responded with two more O'Donnell touchdowns in the third quarter while shutting out the Seahawks. Warren Moon, making his Seattle debut, was limited to seven completions and a pick while backup John Friesz was only slightly better with ten completions. The Jets posted only their fifth win (41–3 final) in their previous 40 games.

- September 14 @ New England Patriots

On Sunday Night Football former Patriots coach Parcells met former Jets coach Pete Carroll at Foxboro Stadium with the Jets 1–1 following a 28–22 loss to Buffalo and the Patriots 2–0. The pregame buildup was huge and the ensuing game turned into a grinder. Drew Bledsoe's touchdown to Ben Coates and a Curtis Martin score were answered by a two-yard O'Donnell rushing score and a John Hall field goal. Bledsoe was picked off by Mo Lewis for a 43-yard Jets touchdown. After Adam Vinatieri tied the game in the third Bledsoe found Lovett Purnell and a 24–17 Patriots lead. Despite being sacked seven times O'Donnell tied the game on a 24-yard score to Keyshawn Johnson, and after forcing a Patriots fumble the Jets were in position to win in the final seconds, but Hall's field goal try was blocked by Mike Jones and the game went to overtime. The Patriots clawed down field and Vinatieri finished it on a 34-yard field goal and a 27–24 Patriots win.

- September 21 vs. Oakland Raiders

The 1–2 Jets rebounded from the loss when they faced the 1–2 Raiders. Jeff George threw three first-half touchdowns (marred by a missed PAT and missed two-point try) and the Raiders led 22–10 at the half. But from there the Jets special teams surged to the fore; John Hall booted two field goals and in the fourth Cole Ford's 28-yard field goal try was blocked by Corwin Brown; Ray Mickens ran the ball 72 yards for the winning touchdown and a 23–22 final; Ford missed four field goal attempts in all. The win snapped a string of 13 consecutive home losses for the Jets.

- October 19 vs. New England Patriots

Entering Week Eight the AFC East race in 1997 had become a four-way fight with the Patriots entering at 5–1, the Jets 5–2, the Dolphins 4–2, and the Bills 3–3; Miami (vs. Baltimore) and Buffalo (vs. winless Indianapolis) would win their games this weekend to stay in the division hunt. In The Meadowlands the Jets scored first on a John Hall field goal, then the Patriots outscored the Jets 19–7 after sacking Neil O'Donnell in the endzone and then getting a Vinatieri field goal and an eight-yard Ben Coates touchdown before Troy Brown caught a 23-yarder. But from there the Patriots fell; Neil O'Donnell was benched and Glenn Foley led the Jets back; Adrian Murrell ran in a five-yard score and later Foley hit Lorenzo Neal. The Jets snuffed out New England's long passes and finished up 24–19 entering their bye week.

- November 9 @ Miami Dolphins

Glenn Foley threw for 322 yards and a touchdown to Kyle Brady but was intercepted once. Dan Marino had a touchdown to Brett Perriman while Karim Abdul-Jabbar had two rushing scores. The 24–17 Dolphins win put both teams plus New England in a three-way tie for the AFC East lead at 6–4 with Buffalo at 5–5; it was also Marino's final victory over the Jets.

- November 23 vs. Minnesota Vikings

Leon Johnson opened scoring by returning a Vikings punt 66 yards for a touchdown. The Jets raced to a 23–7 lead in the third quarter, but in the fourth the Vikings behind Brad Johnson scored twice on touchdowns to Jake Reed and Andrew Glover; a 2-point conversion attempt after Glover's score was stopped, securing the 23–21 win and the first .500 season for the Jets since 1993.

- December 14 vs. Tampa Bay Buccaneers

After losing two straight, falling to 8–6, the Jets authored their most decisive win of the season as they limited the Bucs to 136 total yards and three turnovers. Trent Dilfer was picked off twice by Otis Smith and Smith ran back touchdowns for a combined 96 yards. Leon Johnson opened the third quarter by running back the kickoff 101 yards for another touchdown, and Adrian Murrell finished off the scoring on a seven-yarder in the third. The 31–0 score put the Jets within reach of a division title and secured their first outright winning season since 1988.

- December 21 @ Detroit Lions

With the 9–6 Dolphins hosting the 9–6 Patriots on Monday Night Football the 9–6 Jets had a chance for a Wild Card berth. The Jets clawed out front on ten first-quarter points, but the Lions led by Barry Sanders began storming back. Two Jason Hanson field goals in the second and third quarters were followed by a 25-yard Sanders touchdown. Neil O'Donnell had been rotated in and out under center during the season, but after going 21–35 for 202 yards and a pick Bill Parcells called for others to start throwing the ball. On a halfback option Leon Johnson threw for the endzone but was intercepted. Later rookie Ray Lucas rushed for 30 yards and completed three passes for 28 yards, but was intercepted in the endzone. This ended the Jets' hopes of the postseason in a 13–10 Lions win. The game was marred by near-tragedy, however; on a scramble for an Adrian Murrell fumble Lions linebacker Reggie Brown struck his head into the back of a falling player; he suffered a spinal cord injury and was paralyzed; he lost consciousness but CPR saved his life; he was taken by ambulance to the hospital where surgery prevented his paralysis from being permanent. The injury dominated Parcells’ postgame press conference.

== Standings ==
AFC East
	W	L	T	PCT	PF	PA	STK
^{(3)} New England Patriots	10	6	0	.625	369	289	W1
^{(6)} Miami Dolphins	9	7	0	.563	339	327	L2
New York Jets	9	7	0	.563	348	287	L1
Buffalo Bills	6	10	0	.375	255	367	L3
Indianapolis Colts	3	13	0	.188	313	401	L1
