= Donovan Greer =

American football player (born 1974)

Profile
- Position: Cornerback

Personal information
- Born: September 11, 1974 (age 52); Houston, Texas, U.S.

Career information
- College: Texas A&M
- NFL draft: 1997: undrafted

Career history
- New Orleans Saints (1997)*; Atlanta Falcons (1997); New Orleans Saints (1997); Buffalo Bills (1998–2000); Washington Redskins (2001); Detroit Lions (2002)
- * Offseason or practice squad member only

Awards and highlights
- 2× Second-team All-SWC (1994, 1995)
- Stats at Pro Football Reference

Donovan Orlando Greer (born September 11, 1974) is an American former professional football player who was a cornerback in the National Football League (NFL) for the Atlanta Falcons, New Orleans Saints, Buffalo Bills, Washington Redskins, and the Detroit Lions. He played college football for the Texas A&M Aggies. In 2002, he appeared as himself in the TV film Second String.
