= 1995 All-Southwest Conference football team =

American college football all-star team

The 1995 All-Southwest Conference football team consists of American football players chosen by various organizations for All-Southwest Conference teams for the 1995 NCAA Division I-A football season. The selectors for the 1995 season included the Associated Press (AP). The 1995 team was the final All-Southwest Conference football team due to the conference's dissolution in 1996.

Five teams placed multiple players on the All-Southwest Conference first team as follows:

- Conference champion Texas was ranked No. 14 in the final AP Poll placed six players on the first team: quarterback and SWC Offensive Player of the Year James Brown, tight end Pat Fitzgerald, wide receive Mike Adams, offensive lineman Dan Neil, defensive back Chris Carter, and defensive lineman Tony Brackens.
- Texas A&M was ranked No. 15 in the final AP Poll and also placed six players on the first team: running back and SWC All-Purpose Player of the Year Leeland McElroy, wide receiver Albert Connell, offensive lineman Hunter Goodwin, linebacker Reggie Brown, defensive back Ray Mickens, and defensive lineman Brandon Mitchell
- Texas Tech was ranked No. 23 in the final AP Poll and placed three players on the first team: running back Byron Hanspard, linebacker and SWC Defensive Player of the Year Zach Thomas, and defensive back Marcus Coleman.
- Fourth-place Baylor placed four players on the first team: running back and return specialist Jerod Douglas, offensive lineman Fred Miller, defensive lineman Daryl Gardner, linebacker LaCurtis Jones, and defensive back Adrian Robinson.
- Fifth-place TCU placed three players on the first team: offensive lineman Ryan Tucker, defensive lineman Chris Piland, and placekicker Michael Reeder.

== Offensive selections ==
=== Quarterbacks ===
- James Brown, Texas (AP-1)
- Chuck Clements, Houston (AP-2)

=== Running backs ===
- Byron Hanspard, Texas Tech (AP-1)
- Leeland McElroy, Texas A&M (AP-1)
- Jerod Douglas, Baylor (AP-1)
- Ricky Williams, Texas (AP-2)
- Shon Mitchell, Texas (AP-2)

=== Tight ends ===
- Pat Fitzgerald, Texas (AP-1)
- Hayward Clay, Texas A&M (AP-2)

=== Wide receivers ===
- Mike Adams, Texas (AP-1)
- Albert Connell, Texas A&M (AP-1)
- John Washington, TCU (AP-2)
- Kalief Muhammad, Baylor (AP-2)

=== Offensive linemen ===
- Dan Neil, Texas (AP-1)
- Jimmy Herndon, Houston (AP-1)
- Fred Miller, Baylor (AP-1)
- Hunter Goodwin, Texas A&M (AP-1)
- Ryan Tucker, TCU (AP-1)
- Ben Kaufman, Texas Tech (AP-2)
- John Elmore, Texas (AP-2)
- Brandon Kidd, SMU (AP-2)
- Calvin Collins, Texas A&M (AP-2)
- Keith Chiles, SMU (AP-2)

== Defensive selections ==
=== Defensive lineman ===
- Tony Brackens, Texas (AP-1)
- Brandon Mitchell, Texas A&M (AP-1)
- Daryl Gardener, Baylor (AP-1)
- Chris Piland, TCU (AP-1)
- Chris Atkins, Texas (AP-2)
- Charles Horton, Baylor (AP-2)
- Pat Williams, Texas A&M (AP-2)
- Brynton Goynes, Rice (AP-2)

=== Linebackers ===
- Zach Thomas, Texas Tech (AP-1)
- Reggie Brown, Texas A&M (AP-1)
- LaCurtis Jones, Baylor (AP-1)
- Larry Izzo, Rice (AP-2)
- Keith Mitchell, Texas A&M (AP-2)
- Craig Swann, SMU (AP-2)
- Dat Nguyen, Texas A&M (AP-2)

=== Defensive backs ===
- Chris Carter, Texas (AP-1)
- Ray Mickens, Texas A&M (AP-1)
- Marcus Coleman, Texas Tech (AP-1)
- Adrian Robinson, Baylor (AP-1)
- Bryant Westbrook, Texas (AP-2)
- Taje Allen, Texas (AP-2)
- Cornell Parker, SMU (AP-2)
- Donovan Greer, Texas A&M (AP-2)

== Special teams ==
=== Place-kickers ===
- Michael Reeder, TCU (AP-1)
- Phil Dawson, Texas (AP-2)

=== Punters ===
- Tucker Phillips, Rice (AP-1)
- Sean Terry, Texas A&M (AP-2)

=== Return specialists ===
- Jerod Douglas, Baylor (AP-1)

== Miscellaneous ==
- All purpose: Leeland McElroy, Texas A&M (AP)
- Offensive Player of the Year: James Brown, Texas (AP)
- Defensive Player of the Year: Zach Thomas, Texas Tech (AP)
- Coach of the Year: John Mackovic, Texas (AP)

== Key ==
AP = Associated Press
