= Albert Connell =

American football player (born 1974)

No. 83
- Position: Wide receiver

Personal information
- Born: May 13, 1974 (age 52); Fort Lauderdale, Florida, U.S.
- Listed height: 6 ft 0 in (1.83 m)
- Listed weight: 184 lb (83 kg)

Career information
- High school: Sunrise (FL) Piper
- College: Texas A&M
- NFL draft: 1997: 4th round, 115th overall pick

Career history
- Washington Redskins (1997–2000); New Orleans Saints (2001); Calgary Stampeders (2003–2004)

Awards and highlights
- First-team All-SWC (1995); Second-team All-Big 12 (1996)

Career NFL statistics
- Receptions: 150
- Receiving yards: 2,674
- Receiving touchdowns: 16
- Stats at Pro Football Reference

Career CFL statistics
- Receptions: 47
- Receiving yards: 794
- Touchdowns: 3

Albert Gene Anthony Connell (born May 13, 1974) is an American former professional football player who was a wide receiver in the National Football League (NFL) and Canadian Football League (CFL). He played college football for the Texas A&M Aggies. Connell played in the NFL for the Washington Redskins and the New Orleans Saints and with the CFL's Calgary Stampeders.

== College career ==
He played college football at Trinity Valley Community College in Athens, Texas for two years, and was a member of the 1994 Junior College National Championship team. He was teammates with Al Harris of the Packers, Matt Bryant of the Buccaneers, coach Frank Induisi of St Thomas Aquinas High School, and coach Mark Sartain of East Texas Baptist University. He then went on to play two years at Texas A&M University. In the Aggies' game against Colorado on September 28, 1996, he had 18 receptions.

== Professional career ==
Connell was selected in the fourth round of the 1997 NFL draft, the 115th overall pick. The 6'2", 190-pound receiver played in five games in his first season with the Washington Redskins. He had nine receptions for 138 yards and two touchdowns. In 1998, he played in fourteen games and had 28 receptions for 451 yards and two touchdowns. In 1999, he played in fifteen games and had 62 receptions for 1,132 yards and a career-high seven touchdowns. In 2000, he played in 13 games and had 39 receptions for 762 yards and three touchdowns. Among those was an explosive seven-reception, three-touchdown performance against the Jaguars in October (that served as his only scores on the season). During his time in Washington, Connell was perceived by teammates and executives - both within and by rivals outside the organization - as having attitude problems that would later prevent him from being offered a long-term extension.

In the spring of 2001, the New Orleans Saints signed him to a five-year, $13 million contract that included a $2.5 million signing bonus. In 2001, he played 12 games for the Saints, recording 12 receptions for 191 yards and two touchdowns. His future in the NFL was cut short when he was accused of stealing from Deuce McAllister. He allegedly stole $4,000 from his former Saints teammate and was released from the team. He never played in the NFL again.

At 29 years old, Connell signed with the Calgary Stampeders of the Canadian Football League (CFL) having been off a professional football roster for two years.
