= 1994 All-Southwest Conference football team =

American college football all-star team

The 1994 All-Southwest Conference football team consists of American football players chosen by various organizations for All-Southwest Conference teams for the 1994 NCAA Division I-A football season. The selectors for the 1994 season included the Associated Press (AP).

== Offensive selections ==
=== Quarterbacks ===
- Max Knake, TCU (AP-1)
- Corey Pullig, Texas A&M (AP-2)

=== Running backs ===
- Rodney Thomas, Texas A&M (AP-1)
- Andre Davis, TCU (AP-1)
- Leeland McElroy, Texas A&M (AP-2)
- Byron Hanspard, Texas Tech (AP-2)

=== Tight ends ===
- Brian Collins, TCU (AP-1)
- James McKeehan, Texas A&M (AP-2)

=== Wide receivers ===
- Mike Rossley, SMU (AP-1)
- Ben Bronson, Baylor (AP-1)
- Lovell Pinkney, Texas (AP-2)
- Eric Jackson, Texas (AP-2)

=== Centers ===
- Barret Robbins, TCU (AP-1)
- Scott Fitzgerald, Texas Tech (AP-2)
- Dan Neil, Texas (AP-2)

=== Offensive linemen ===
- Blake Brockermeyer, Texas (AP-1)
- Calvin Collins, Texas A&M (AP-1)
- Chris Cooley, Rice (AP-1)
- Fred Miller, Baylor (AP-1)
- Jimmy Herndon, Houston (AP-2)
- Brandon Hickman, TCU (AP-2)
- Brannon Kidd, SMU (AP-2)
- Billy Milner, Houston (AP-2)

== Defensive selections ==
=== Defensive lineman ===
- Damon Wickware, Texas Tech (AP-1)
- Royal West, TCU (AP-1)
- Brandon Mitchell, Texas A&M (AP-1)
- Tony Brackens, Texas (AP-1)
- Scotty Lewis, Baylor (AP-2)
- Larry Jackson, Texas A&M (AP-2)
- Byron Wright, Texas Tech (AP-2)
- Thomas Baskin, Texas (AP-2)

=== Linebackers ===
- Zach Thomas, Texas Tech (AP-1)
- Antonio Armstrong, Texas A&M (AP-1)
- LaCurtis Jones, Baylor (AP-1)
- N. D. Kalu, Rice (AP-2)
- Reggie Graham, Texas A&M (AP-2)
- Chris Bordano, SMU (AP-2)

=== Defensive backs ===
- Bart Thomas, Texas Tech (AP-1)
- Marcus Coleman, Texas Tech (AP-1)
- Ray Mickens, Texas A&M (AP-1)
- Adrian Robinson, Baylor (AP-1)
- Donovan Greer, Texas A&M (AP-2)
- Cat Adams, Texas Tech (AP-2)
- Michael Hendrix, Texas A&M (AP-2)
- Dennis Allen, Texas A&M (AP-2)
- Joey Ellis, Texas (AP-2)

== Special teams ==
=== Place-kickers ===
- Phil Dawson, Texas (AP-1)
- Kyle Bryant, Texas A&M (AP-2)

=== Punters ===
- Jason Stott, Houston (AP-1)
- Ty Atteberry, Baylor (AP-2)

=== Return specialists ===
- Leeland McElroy, Texas A&M (AP-1)
- Ben Bronson, Baylor (AP-2)

== Miscellaneous ==
- Offensive Player of the Year: Andre Davis, TCU (AP)
- Defensive Player of the Year: Zach Thomas, Texas Tech (AP)
- Coach of the Year: Spike Dykes, Texas Tech (AP)

== Key ==
AP = Associated Press
