= LaCurtis Jones =

American gridiron football player (born 1972)

No. 57, 44
- Position: Linebacker

Personal information
- Born: June 23, 1972 (age 54); Waco, Texas, U.S.
- Listed height: 6 ft 0 in (1.83 m)
- Listed weight: 200 lb (91 kg)

Career information
- High school: Waco
- College: Baylor
- NFL draft: 1996: 4th round, 125th overall pick

Career history
- Miami Dolphins (1996)*; Tampa Bay Buccaneers (1996); Montreal Alouettes (1998)
- * Offseason or practice squad member only

Awards and highlights
- 2× First-team All-SWC (1994, 1995)
- Stats at Pro Football Reference

LaCurtis Burl Jones (born June 23, 1972) is an American former professional football player who was a linebacker for the Tampa Bay Buccaneers of the National Football League (NFL) in 1996. He played college football for the Baylor Bears and was selected in the fourth round of the 1996 NFL draft with the 125th overall pick.
