= Leeland McElroy =

American football player (born 1974)

No. 30
- Positions: Running back, return specialist

Personal information
- Born: June 25, 1974 (age 52); Beaumont, Texas, U.S.
- Listed height: 5 ft 9 in (1.75 m)
- Listed weight: 212 lb (96 kg)

Career information
- High school: Central (Beaumont)
- College: Texas A&M
- NFL draft: 1996: 2nd round, 32nd overall pick

Career history
- Arizona Cardinals (1996–1997); Tampa Bay Buccaneers (1998)*; Denver Broncos (1999)*; Indianapolis Colts (1999)
- * Offseason or practice squad member only

Awards and highlights
- Consensus All-American (1994); First-team All-American (1995); Second-team All-American (1993); 3× First-team All-SWC (1993, 1994, 1995)

Career NFL statistics
- Rushing yards: 729
- Rushing average: 3.3
- Rushing touchdowns: 3
- Receptions: 12
- Receiving yards: 73
- Receiving touchdowns: 1
- Return yards: 1,148
- Stats at Pro Football Reference

Leeland Anthony McElroy (born June 25, 1974) is an American former professional football player who was a running back and kick returner in the National Football League (NFL) for two seasons during the 1990s. He played college football for the Texas A&M Aggies, and was recognized as a consensus All-American kick returner. A second-round pick in the 1996 NFL draft, he played professionally for the Arizona Cardinals.

== Early life ==
McElroy was born in Beaumont, Texas. He attended Central High School in Beaumont, and played high school football for the Beaumont Central Jaguars.

== College career ==
McElroy accepted an athletic scholarship to attend Texas A&M University, and played for the Aggies from 1992 to 1995.

In 1995, McElroy became the undisputed starter — his only year to start at running back at A&M. A&M was coming off a 10-0-1 season and top-10 ranking, with most of their starters returning for their upperclassmen years. Corey Pullig was a senior quarterback, McElroy was a Heisman Trophy candidate as a junior, and an experienced defense paved the way for Playboy and The Sporting News to rank A&M No. 1 in the preseason.

The Aggies began the season with impressive wins over LSU (in which McElroy ran for 229 yards, 5th in Aggie history for a single game) and Tulsa, and took a #3 ranking to Boulder to face the #5 Colorado with A&M mounting a "'Lectric Leeland" Heisman marketing campaign. McElroy played poorly and the Aggies lost a disappointing game. A&M tipped passes for interceptions, receiver Chris Sanders dropped a sure touchdown on a screen pass across a wide-open middle of the field, and future NFL fullback Detron Smith dropped a sure huge gain on a swing pass in the flat. Star linebacker Reggie Brown even blew a coverage at the end zone, giving up a circus-catch touchdown.

Another poor performance followed, along with another Aggie loss against Texas Tech in Lubbock the following week. McElroy rushed for 1,122 yards (112.2 per game) and 1709 all-purpose yards (2nd for a single season in Aggie history by just 30 yards) that season, but completely missed two games and sat out parts of others as a result of injuries. The Aggies finished 9-3 with a win against Michigan in the Alamo Bowl, but with those two losses as well as a home loss to rival Texas, the season that began with National Championship hopes was considered a disappointment by Aggie fans. For McElroy, the injuries, along with several less than spectacular performances against Colorado, Texas Tech, Baylor and Houston, turned a season that began with Heisman hopes into a fall filled with frustration.

After his junior season, McElroy declared early for the NFL draft. In spite of his spectacular junior year, injury concerns caused McElroy to drop in the draft. Although projected to be a first round pick, he instead holds the distinction of being the lowest picked player to attend the NFL draft. McElroy was selected in second round in 1996 by the Arizona Cardinals at number thirty-two. He has become somewhat of a cautionary tale against football players leaving school early. Aggie head Coach R. C. Slocum and others speculated that if McElroy had returned in 1996, he would have benefited from playing with a more prolific passer in Branndon Stewart and probably would have faced fewer eight-man defensive fronts. These factors along with the additional experience might have resulted in McElroy's Heisman hopes coming to fruition and his entering the draft a more seasoned, more complete back.

McElroy was a first-team selection on the Football Writers Association of America All-America team in 1994 and was a first-team Associated Press All-American all-purpose back in 1995. One of the fastest runners in college football history, McElroy set several NCAA records for kickoff returns in his career including most returns for a touchdown in one game and most returns for touchdowns in a single season. His final career average (36.3) set the NCAA record. He was a first-team selection on the Football Writers Association of America All-America team in 1994. He holds the Texas A&M record for average all-purpose yards per game with 135. He is also tied for the longest kickoff return in A&M history (100 yards, which he did twice).

== Professional career ==
The Arizona Cardinals selected McElroy in the second round (32nd overall) of the 1996 NFL draft. He played for the Cardinals from (1996 to 1997). In his rookie NFL season, 1996, McElroy started for the Cardinals in the season opener against the Indianapolis Colts, rushing for 63 yards on 17 carries, but struggled in the second week against Miami, when he carried six times for negative five yards. The next week against New England, he had just 11 yards on eight carries, and against New Orleans in the fourth week of the season, McElroy was replaced in the lineup after gaining just five yards on four carries. LeShon Johnson took over the starting duties in week 5, and McElroy was relegated to backup and special teams. Overall, McElroy had just 86 yards on 38 carries in the Cardinals’ first seven games and finished with 305 yards on 89 carries. The 1997 season was not much better. McElroy opened the season as the Cardinals' starting tailback and averaged 18 carries in the first five games. He scored both his touchdowns that year in the first two games and after rushing for 281 yards in the first five games, he managed just 143 the rest of the year. Although he led the Cardinals in rushing, he finished with just 424 yards on 135 carries - a paltry 3.14 yards per carry. After averaging 21.3 yards on 51 kickoff returns in 1996, McElroy did not field a single kickoff in 1997, surrendering those duties to Kevin Williams, who averaged 24.7 in his place.

The Cardinals released McElroy and he was claimed off waivers in July 1998 by the Tampa Bay Buccaneers and made an instant impact with a spectacular touchdown run in the Pro Football Hall of Fame Game against the Pittsburgh Steelers. He played well, rushing 27 times for 121 yards and a touchdown in the preseason, but the Buccaneers were deep at running back and McElroy's specialty was kickoff returns, where Tampa already featured Reidel Anthony and Warrick Dunn. Tony Dungy said that "[at that] point it would be best to give him a chance to maybe hook on with someone else, and he had such an impressive preseason, [they hoped] for him for that to be the case." Unfortunately it would not be so. Although he spent the 1999 preseason with the Denver Broncos and was picked up later that season by the Indianapolis Colts, a combination of injuries and misfortune ensured that McElroy never played again in the NFL.
