= Jimmy Herndon =

American football player (born 1973)

No. 74, 75
- Position: Offensive tackle

Personal information
- Born: August 30, 1973 (age 53); Baytown, Texas, U.S.
- Listed height: 6 ft 8 in (2.03 m)
- Listed weight: 318 lb (144 kg)

Career information
- High school: Robert E. Lee (Baytown)
- College: Houston
- NFL draft: 1996: 5th round, 146th overall pick

Career history
- Jacksonville Jaguars (1996); Chicago Bears (1997–2001); Houston Texans (2002–2003)

Awards and highlights
- First-team All-SWC (1995); Second-team All-SWC (1994)

Career NFL statistics
- Games played: 54
- Games started: 11
- Fumble recoveries: 1
- Stats at Pro Football Reference

James Scott Herndon (born August 30, 1973) is an American former professional football player who was an offensive tackle in the National Football League (NFL). He was selected by the Jacksonville Jaguars in the fifth round of the 1996 NFL draft. He played college football for the Houston Cougars

He was also a member of the Chicago Bears and Houston Texans.

Herndon is now the Executive Pastor at Second Baptist Church in Baytown, Texas. Second Baptist Baytown
