= Ben Bronson =

American football player (born 1972)

No. 18, 11
- Position: Wide receiver

Personal information
- Born: September 9, 1972 (age 54); Jasper, Texas, U.S.
- Listed height: 5 ft 9 in (1.75 m)
- Listed weight: 159 lb (72 kg)

Career information
- High school: Jasper
- College: Baylor
- NFL draft: 1995: undrafted

Career history
- Indianapolis Colts (1995); Detroit Lions (1995)*; Houston ThunderBears (1998–2001); Dallas Desperados (2002); Carolina Cobras (2003)
- * Offseason or practice squad member only

Awards and highlights
- AFL Breakout Player of the Year (2000); First-team All-SWC (1994)

Career NFL statistics
- Return yards: 110
- Stats at Pro Football Reference

Career AFL statistics
- Receptions: 278
- Receiving yards: 3,544
- Touchdowns: 49
- Stats at ArenaFan.com

Benjamin James Bronson (born September 9, 1972) is an American former professional football player who was a wide receiver in the National Football League (NFL) and Arena Football League (AFL). He played in the NFL for the Indianapolis Colts and the AFL for the Houston ThunderBears and Carolina Cobras. He played college football for the Baylor Bears.

Bronson also played college baseball at Baylor and professionally in the Kansas City Royals organization from 1996 to 1997.

In 2000, he was named the AFL Breakout Player of the Year. Outside of arena football, Bronson appeared in The Longest Yard (2005).

Bronson is the twin brother to the former American Olympic 400-meter hurdler, John Bryan Bronson, who won the bronze medal at the 1997 World Championships in Athens. Bryan Bronson
