= 1996 All-Big 12 Conference football team =

The 1996 All-Big 12 Conference football team consists of American football players chosen as All-Big 12 Conference players for the 1996 NCAA Division I-A football season. The conference recognizes two official All-Big 12 selectors: (1) the Big 12 conference coaches selected separate offensive and defensive units and named first-, second- and third-team players (the "Coaches" team); and (2) a panel of sports writers and broadcasters covering the Big 12 also selected offensive and defensive units and named first- and second-team players (the "Media" team).

This was the first year of competition for the Big 12 Conference.

== Offensive selections ==
=== Quarterbacks ===
- Koy Detmer, Colorado (Coaches-1; Media-1)
- Zebbie Lethridge, Texas Tech (Coaches-2)

=== Running backs ===
- Troy Davis, Iowa State (Coaches-1; Media-1)
- Byron Hanspard, Texas Tech (Coaches-1; Media-1)
- Ricky Williams, Texas (Coaches-1)
- June Henley, Kansas (Coaches-2)
- David Thompson, Oklahoma State (Coaches-2)
- De'Mond Parker, Oklahoma (Coaches-2)

=== Offensive line ===
- Chris Naeole, Colorado (Coaches-1; Media-1)
- Chris Dishman, Nebraska (Coaches-1; Media-1)
- Aaron Taylor, Nebraska (Coaches-1; Media-1)
- Dan Neil, Texas (Coaches-1; Media-1)
- Calvin Collins, Texas A&M (Coaches-1)
- Ben Kaufman, Texas Tech (Media-1; Coaches-2)
- Pat Augafa, Iowa State (Coaches-2)
- Tim Kohn, Iowa State (Coaches-2)
- Jason Johnson, Kansas State (Coaches-2)
- Eric Anderson, Nebraska (Coaches-2)

=== Tight ends ===
- Alonzo Mayes, Oklahoma State (Coaches-1; Media-1)
- Pat Fitzgerald, Texas (Coaches-2)

=== Receivers ===
- Rae Carruth, Colorado (Coaches-1; Media-1)
- Kevin Lockett, Kansas State (Coaches-1; Media-1)
- Isaac Byrd, Kansas (Coaches-2)
- Albert Connell, Texas A&M (Coaches-2)

== Defensive selections ==
=== Defensive linemen ===
- Grant Wistrom, Nebraska (Coaches-1; Media-1)
- Nyle Wiren, Kansas State (Coaches-1; Media-1)
- Ryan Olson, Colorado (Coaches-1)
- Jason Peter, Nebraska (Coaches-1; Media-1)
- Brandon Mitchell, Texas A&M (Coaches-1)
- Jared Tomich, Nebraska (Media-1)
- Greg Jones, Colorado (Coaches-2)
- Keith Mitchell, Texas A&M (Coaches-2)
- Jeff Ogard, Nebraska (Coaches-2)
- Barron Tanner, Oklahoma (Coaches-2)
- Chris Akins, Texas (Coaches-2)

=== Linebackers ===
- Matt Russell, Colorado (Coaches-1; Media-1)
- Tyrell Peters, Oklahoma (Coaches-1; Media-1)
- Keith Mitchell, Texas A&M (Media-1)
- Jon Hesse, Nebraska (Media-1)
- Dat Nguyen, Texas A&M (Coaches-2)
- Ronnie Ward, Kansas (Coaches-2)

=== Defensive backs ===
- Steve Rosga, Colorado (Coaches-1; Media-1)
- Chris Canty (defensive back), Kansas State (Coaches-1; Media-1)
- Mario Smith, Kansas State (Coaches-1)
- Bryant Westbrook, Texas (Coaches-1; Media-1)
- Mike Minter, Nebraska (Coaches-2; Media-1)
- George McCullough, Baylor (Coaches-2)
- Ryan Black, Colorado (Coaches-2)
- Michael Booker, Nebraska (Coaches-2)

== Special teams ==
=== Kickers ===
- Phil Dawson, Texas (Coaches-1; Media-1)
- Kris Brown, Nebraska (Coaches-2)

=== Punters ===
- Ty Atteberry, Baylor (Coaches-1; Media-1)
- Marc Harris, Iowa State (Coaches-2)

=== Return specialists ===
- Kalief Muhammad, Baylor (Coaches-1)
- Dante Hall, Texas A&M (Media-1)
- Andre Richardson, Oklahoma State (Coaches-2)

== Key ==
Bold = selected as a first-team player by both the coaches and media panel

Coaches = selected by Big 12 Conference coaches

Media = selected by a media panel

== See also ==
- 1996 College Football All-America Team
