= Zach Thomas =

American football player (born 1973)

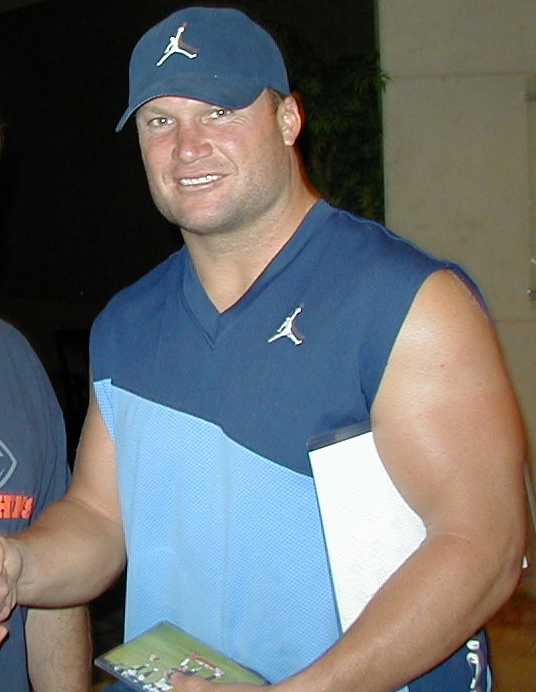
- Thomas in 2002

No. 54, 55
- Position: Linebacker

Personal information
- Born: September 1, 1973 (age 53); Pampa, Texas, U.S.
- Listed height: 5 ft 11 in (1.80 m)
- Listed weight: 228 lb (103 kg)

Career information
- High school: White Deer (TX), Pampa (TX)
- College: Texas Tech (1992–1995)
- NFL draft: 1996: 5th round, 154th overall pick

Career history
- Miami Dolphins (1996–2007); Dallas Cowboys (2008); Kansas City Chiefs (2009)*
- * Offseason or practice squad member only

Awards and highlights
- 5× First-team All-Pro (1998, 1999, 2002, 2003, 2006); 2× Second-team All-Pro (2001, 2005); 7× Pro Bowl (1999–2003, 2005, 2006); 2× NFL Alumni Linebacker of the Year (1998, 2006); 2× NFL combined tackles leader (2002, 2006); NFL 2000s All-Decade Team; PFWA All-Rookie Team (1996); Miami Dolphins Honor Roll; Unanimous All-American (1995); Second-team All-American (1994); 2× SWC Defensive Player of the Year (1994, 1995); 2× First-team All-SWC (1994, 1995); Texas Tech Red Raiders Ring of Honor; Texas Tech Hall of Fame (2006)

Career NFL statistics
- Total tackles: 1,734
- Sacks: 20.5
- Forced fumbles: 16
- Fumble recoveries: 8
- Interceptions: 17
- Defensive touchdowns: 4
- Stats at Pro Football Reference
- Pro Football Hall of Fame
- College Football Hall of Fame

Zachary Michael Thomas (born September 1, 1973), nicknamed "Baby Elephant", is an American former professional football player who was a linebacker in the National Football League (NFL) for 13 seasons. He played college football for the Texas Tech Red Raiders, and was recognized as a unanimous All-American. He was selected in the fifth round, 22nd pick (154th overall), in the 1996 NFL draft by the Miami Dolphins, and played for the Dolphins in his first 12 seasons in the NFL, before playing his 13th and final season with the Dallas Cowboys.

In his rookie year in 1996, Thomas was voted the Dolphins Team Newcomer of the Year, and also won his first of two Dolphins Team MVP awards (1996, 2001). He was also named the AFC Defensive Rookie of the Year in 1996. Thomas was also the first Dolphins player to win the Dolphins Team Leadership Award (voted by his teammates) a record three times (1998–1999, 2005), until Jason Taylor surpassed him with four (2002, 2006–2007, 2009).

From 1998 to 2006, Thomas led a defensive unit that finished top 10 in total defense in seven consecutive seasons (1998–2004), and in eight out of nine (2006). In five of those nine seasons (1998, 2000, 2002–2003, 2006), Thomas' defenses finished top five in total scoring defense, including first overall in 1998.

Thomas is also known for his longevity with the Dolphins, and currently is second all-time in Dolphins history for most games played by a defensive player in the team's history with 168, behind Taylor's 204. A seven-time Pro Bowl selection (the most ever by a Dolphins defensive player), and seven-time first- or second-team All-Pro, Thomas recorded more than 1,700 combined tackles (1,100+ solo) in his career which included leading the league in tackles twice (2002, 2006), topping at least 100 combined tackles (he topped 150+ tackles six times) in 10 out of his 12 seasons with the Dolphins, and ranks sixth on the NFL's all-time career tackles list. He was named a two-time NFL Alumni Linebacker of the Year (1998, 2006), and was also selected to the NFL 2000s All-Decade Team.

In 2006, Thomas was inducted into the Texas Tech Athletics Hall of Fame, and was later enshrined into the Texas Tech Red Raiders Ring of Honor in 2016. In 2015, Thomas was inducted into the College Football Hall of Fame. In 2012, Thomas was enshrined into the Miami Dolphins Honor Roll, and on February 9, 2023, in his 10th year of eligibility and in his fourth straight year being a finalist, Zach Thomas was elected as a member to the Pro Football Hall of Fame Class of 2023.

== Early life ==
Thomas was born in Pampa, Texas. He attended White Deer Schools in White Deer, Texas, until he was a sophomore and transferred to Pampa High School in his junior year. He was a standout high school football player and was named a first-team all-state selection as a senior. He and his older brother, Bart, were high school teammates at White Deer High School in White Deer. In 1988, Zach Thomas' freshman year, the White Deer team went 16–0 winning the Class 1A state championship.

== College career ==
Thomas attended Texas Tech University in Lubbock, where he was a three-year starter at linebacker for the Texas Tech Red Raider football team. As a junior in 1994, he was a second-team All-American. As a senior in 1995, he was a unanimous first-team All-American, the Big 12 Conference Defensive Player of the Year, and a finalist for the Butkus Award. Thomas is one of six Red Raiders to be named a unanimous All-American along with Mark Bounds, Byron Hanspard, Michael Crabtree, Jace Amaro, and Jacob Rodriguez. He recorded 390 tackles, including a career-high 131 tackles and a school-record 20 tackles against Georgia in his senior season. Thomas and his brother Bart were the only pair of brothers to be named first-team All-Southwest Conference selections in the same year.

Zach Thomas' most memorable college game for Texas Tech occurred on October 7, 1995, against rival Texas A&M University. Texas A&M entered the game riding a five-game winning streak against Texas Tech dating back to 1990. In a defensive 7–7 tie ballgame heading late into the fourth quarter, Thomas intercepted a pass and returned it 25 yards for a touchdown with 34 seconds remaining, helping Texas Tech snap their five-game losing streak to Texas A&M, winning by a final score of 14–7. Thomas finished the game with 12 combined tackles, one fumble recovery, and the game-clinching interception return for a touchdown.

Thomas was inducted into the College Football Hall of Fame in 2015.

=== College awards and honors ===
- Second-team Houston Chronicle All-SWC (1993)
- Second-team Houston Post All-SWC (1993)
- First-team UPI All-American (1994)
- Second-team Football News All-American (1994)
- Second-team Sporting News All-American (1994)
- 2× SWC Defensive Player of the Year (1994, 1995)
- Unanimous first-team All-American (1995)
- First-team All-SWC (1995)
- College Football Hall of Fame
- Texas Tech Hall of Fame

== Professional career ==
Pre-draft measurables
Height	Weight	Arm length	Hand span	40-yard dash	10-yard split	20-yard split	20-yard shuttle	Vertical jump	Broad jump	Bench press
5 ft 11 in (1.80 m)	233 lb (106 kg)	30 5/8 in (0.78 m)	9 1/4 in (0.23 m)	4.85 s	1.67 s	2.77 s	4.24 s	28.5 in (0.72 m)	8 ft 8 in (2.64 m)	20 reps
All values from NFL Combine

Thomas attended the NFL Scouting Combine in Indianapolis, Indiana but had a performance which was described as lousy including a 28.5" vertical jump. Miami Dolphins' special-teams coordinator, Mike Westhoff, was sent to Texas by the Dolphins to meet with Thomas and scout him for their special-teams unit. Thomas was considered to be too small and not fast or athletic enough to play at the professional level according to scouts and draft experts.

=== Miami Dolphins ===
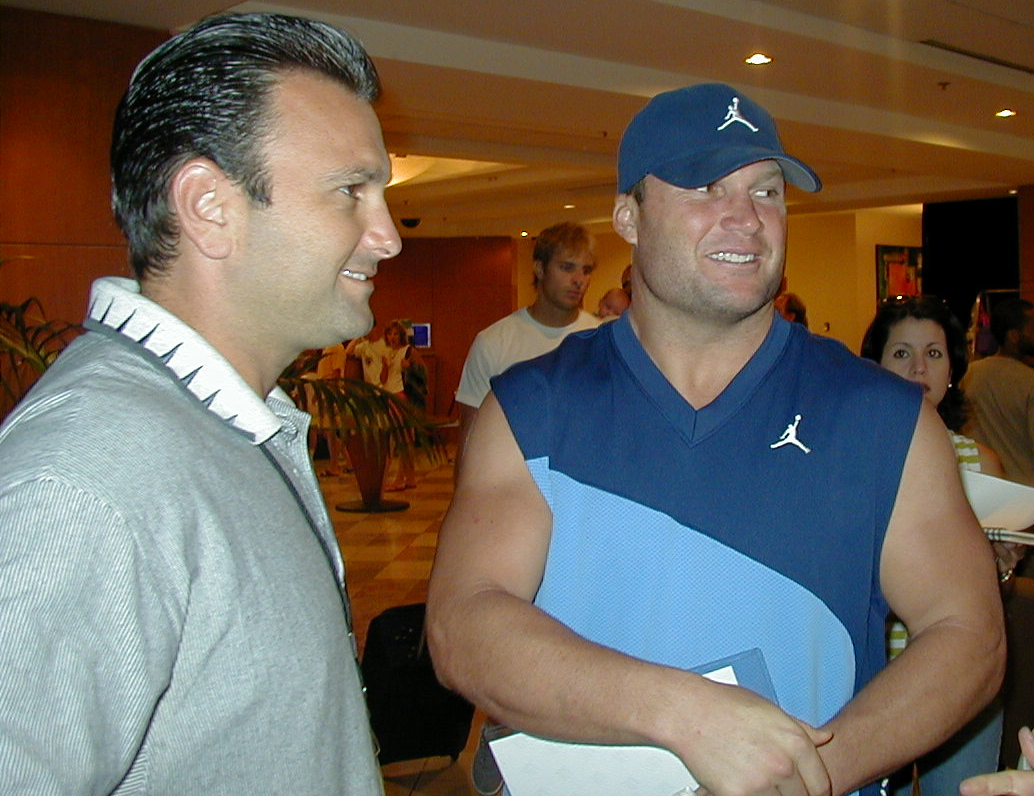
Thomas (right) with agent Drew Rosenhaus

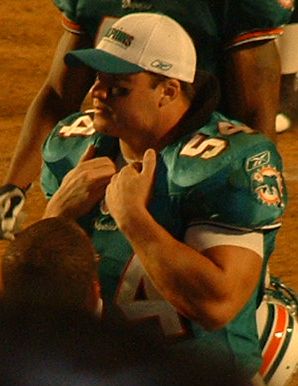
Thomas with the Miami Dolphins

The Miami Dolphins selected Thomas in the fifth round (154th overall) of the 1996 NFL draft. Thomas was the 18th linebacker drafted in a linebacker class that included Ray Lewis, Tedy Bruschi, Donnie Edwards, and Kevin Hardy. Thomas was the second linebacker the Dolphins drafted in 1996, joining their fourth-round pick Baylor linebacker LaCurtis Jones (126th overall). Thomas was initially drafted to join special teams after the Miami Dolphins' special-teams coordinator Mike Westhoff recommended him to head coach Jimmy Johnson.

The bottom line is that Zach Thomas was making plays. He has quickness, he's an instinctive player, and he makes plays ... Jack Del Rio would still be here and still be our starter were it not for the play of Zach Thomas.

— Jimmy Johnson (1996)

==== 1996 ====
On July 3, 1996, the Dolphins signed Thomas to a three-year, $577,000 contract at the league minimum. He impressed the Dolphins' coaching staff during training camp and quickly rose up the depth chart to compete for the job as the starting middle linebacker against Jack Del Rio. Head coach Jimmy Johnson officially named Thomas the starting middle linebacker to begin the regular season. On August 3, 1996, the Dolphins subsequently released Del Rio due to the sudden emergence of Thomas.

He made his professional regular-season debut and first career start in the Miami Dolphins' season-opener at home, against the New England Patriots and made nine combined tackles and his first career sack in their 24–10 victory. Thomas made his first career tackle on Patriots' running back Curtis Martin and made his first career sack on Patriots' quarterback Drew Bledsoe for a six-yard loss in the first quarter. The following week, he collected a season-high 15 combined tackles as the Dolphins defeated the Arizona Cardinals 38–10. In week 6, he collected 12 combined tackles in the Dolphins' 22–15 loss against the Seattle Seahawks. On October 13, 1996, Thomas recorded 11 combined tackles, a sack, and made his first career interception during a 21–7 win at the Buffalo Bills in week 7. Thomas made his first career interception off a pass by Bills' quarterback Jim Kelly that was originally intended for tight end Lonnie Johnson, and returned it for an 11-yard gain in the first quarter. On November 17, 1996, Thomas made eight combined tackles and returned an interception for his first career touchdown in the Dolphins' 23–20 win against the Houston Oilers in week 12. Thomas intercepted a pass by Oilers' quarterback Chris Chandler that was intended for tight end Frank Wycheck, and returned it for a 26-yard touchdown in the fourth quarter. Thomas finished his rookie season in 1996 with 153 combined tackles, three interceptions, and two sacks, while starting all 16 games. Thomas was a 1997 Pro Bowl alternate and an All-Rookie selection in 1996.

==== 1997 ====
On August 4, 1997, Thomas sustained a fractured fibula during the Dolphins' 38–19 win against the Denver Broncos in their preseason-opener. His injury sidelined him for the remainder of the preseason and he was also inactive for the Miami Dolphins' 16–10 season-opening victory against the Indianapolis Colts . Head coach Jimmy Johnson named Thomas the starting middle linebacker upon his return from injury. He started alongside outside linebackers Anthony Harris and Derrick Rodgers. In week 4, he collected a season-high 12 combined tackles and made an interception during a 31–21 loss at the Tampa Bay Buccaneers. On October 27, 1997, Thomas tied his season-high of 12 combined tackles in the Dolphins' 36–33 loss at the Chicago Bears in week 9. He finished the 1997 season with a total of 127 combined tackles, an interception, and was credited with half a sack in 15 games and 15 starts.

The Miami Dolphins finished second in the AFC East with a 9–7 record and earned a wildcard berth. On December 28, 1997, Thomas started in his first career playoff game and recorded 10 combined tackles during the Dolphins 17–3 loss as the New England Patriots won the AFC Wildcard Game.

==== 1998 ====
Thomas was retained as the starting middle linebacker for the third consecutive season and started alongside outside linebackers Robert Jones and Derrick Rodgers.

On September 20, 1998, Thomas recorded eight combined tackles and returned an interception for a touchdown during a 21–0 win against the Pittsburgh Steelers in week 3. Thomas intercepted a pass by Steelers' quarterback Kordell Stewart and returned it for a 17-yard touchdown in the third quarter. On November 1, 1998, he collected a season-high 14 combined tackles during a 30–24 loss at the Buffalo Bills in week 9. In week 14, Thomas recorded six combined tackles and made a season-high two interceptions in the Dolphins' 27–17 win at the Oakland Raiders. Thomas intercepted two pass attempts by quarterback Donald Hollas. He started in all 16 games in 1998 and recorded 133 combined tackles, three interceptions, and two sacks. Thomas was first-team All-Pro for the first time in his career as the Dolphins defense allowed the fewest points in the NFL.

The Miami Dolphins finished second in the AFC East with a 10–6 record and earned a playoff berth. On January 2, 1999, Thomas recorded eight combined tackles during a 24–17 win against the Buffalo Bills in the AFC Wildcard Game. The following week, he made 10 combined tackles as the Dolphins' lost to the Denver Broncos in the AFC Divisional Round 38–3.

==== 1999 ====
On February 13, 1999, the Miami Dolphins signed Thomas to a five-year, $22.50 million contract that included a signing bonus of $4.50 million. Thomas's $6.5 million in salary and bonus made him the Dolphins highest-paid player, surpassing Dan Marino. Head coach Jimmy Johnson retained Thomas, Robert Jones, and Derrick Rodgers as the starting linebackers in 1999. In week 15, Thomas collected a season-high 13 combined tackles during the Dolphins' 12–9 win against the San Diego Chargers. He started in all 16 games in 1999 and recorded 132 combined tackles, a sack, and an interception. Thomas was selected to the 2000 Pro Bowl, marking the first of his career.

The Miami Dolphins finished third in the AFC East with a 9–7 record and earned a playoff berth. On January 9, 2000, Thomas recorded nine combined tackles and a sack during a 20–17 victory at the Seattle Seahawks in the AFC Wildcard Game. The following week, he made 10 combined tackles as the Dolphins lost 62–7 at the Jacksonville Jaguars in the AFC Divisional Round.

==== 2000 ====
On January 17, 2000, head coach Jimmy Johnson announced his decision to step down as head coach of the Miami Dolphins. Assistant head coach Dave Wannstedt was promoted to head coach. Wannstedt opted to retain Thomas as the starting middle linebacker, alongside Robert Jones and Derrick Rodgers. On September 17, 2000, Thomas collected a season-high 13 combined tackles during a 19–6 win against the Baltimore Ravens in week 3. Thomas was sidelined during the Dolphins' week 5 victory at the Cincinnati Bengals due to a sprained ankle. Thomas was inactive for four games (weeks 9–12) after aggravating his sprained ankle during a week 8 loss at the New York Jets the previous week. He finished the 2000 season with 99 combined tackles, 1.5 sacks, and an interception in 11 games and 11 starts.

==== 2001 ====
Defensive coordinator Jim Bates retained Thomas as the starting middle linebacker. He started alongside Twan Russell and Derrick Rodgers to begin the 2001 regular season.

He started in the Miami Dolphins' season-opener at the Tennessee Titans and recorded nine combined tackles, deflected two passes, and returned an interception for a touchdown in their 31–23 victory. Thomas intercepted a pass by Titans backup quarterback Neil O'Donnell, that was intended for tight end Erron Kinney, and returned it for a 34-yard touchdown in the fourth quarter. The following week, he collected a career-high 18 combined tackles (9 solo) during an 18–15 victory against the Oakland Raiders in week 2. In week 5, he recorded 9 combined tackles and made a season-high 1-1/2 sacks as the Dolphins lost 21–17 at the New York Jets. Thomas finished the 2001 season with 154 combined tackles (94 solo), three sacks, two pass deflections, two interceptions, and a touchdown in 15 games and 15 starts. Head coach Dave Wannstedt chose to rest Thomas during the Dolphins' week 17 win against the Buffalo Bills, as they had already clinched a playoff berth. Thomas was also selected to play in the 2002 Pro Bowl.

The Miami Dolphins finished second in the AFC East in 2001 with an 11–5 record. On January 13, 2002, Thomas recorded 22 combined tackles (14 solo) during the Dolphins' 20–3 loss against the Baltimore Ravens in the AFC Wildcard Game.

==== 2002 ====
Thomas returned as the starting middle linebacker under Wannstedt and started alongside outside linebackers Derrick Rodgers and Morlon Greenwood. On December 29, 2002, Thomas collected a season-high 16 combined tackles (11 solo) in the Dolphins' 27–24 loss at the New England Patriots in week 17. He started in all 16 games in 2002 and recorded 156 combined tackles (101 solo), two pass deflections, an interception, and was credited with half a sack.

==== 2003 ====
On March 27, 2003, the Miami Dolphins signed Thomas to a five-year, $33.75 million contract extension which included a signing bonus of $10.50 million. The agreement kept him under contract with Miami through 2008.

On November 2, 2003, Thomas collected a season-high 19 combined tackles (12 solo) in the Dolphins' 23–17 loss to the Indianapolis Colts in week 9. He was inactive for the Dolphins' week 10 loss at the Tennessee Titans due to a groin injury. On November 27, 2003, Thomas made six combined tackles, a pass deflection, a sack, and an interception during a 40–21 victory at the Dallas Cowboys in week 13. Thomas intercepted a pass by Cowboys' quarterback Quincy Carter that was intended for wide receiver Terry Glenn in the fourth quarter. He finished the 2002 season with 152 combined tackles, 84 solo), six pass deflections, three interceptions, and a sack in 15 games and 15 starts. Thomas was selected to play in the 2004 Pro Bowl and earned his fifth All-Pro selection in six years.

==== 2004 ====
Thomas started alongside Greenwood and Junior Seau in 2004 after the Dolphins signed Seau during free agency. On November 9, 2004, head coach Dave Wannstedt unexpectedly announced his resignation as the Miami Dolphins' head coach after they declined and fell to a 1–8 record. Defensive coordinator Jim Bates was promoted to interim head coach for the last seven games of the regular season. Thomas injured his hamstring and was sidelined for three games (Weeks 13–15). On December 26, 2004, Thomas collected a season-high 18 combined tackles (nine solo) during the Dolphins' 10–7 victory against the Cleveland Browns in week 16. He finished the 2004 NFL season with 145 combined tackles (85 solo), four pass deflections, and two sacks in 13 games and 13 starts. The Miami Dolphins finished with a disappointing record of 4–12 and the remaining coaching staff was fired after the season.

==== 2005 ====
Head coach Nick Saban retained Thomas as the starting middle linebacker in 2005. Thomas started the 2005 season alongside outside linebackers Channing Crowder and Junior Seau. He also played under defensive coordinator Richard Smith and linebackers coach George Edwards.

In week 3, he collected a season-high 16 combined tackles (nine solo), broke up a pass, and made a sack during a 27–24 win against the Carolina Panthers. On October 21, 2005, Thomas made 14 combined tackles (eight solo) as the Dolphins lost 30–20 to the Kansas City Chiefs in week 7. His 14 combined tackles against the Chiefs continued his streak of six consecutive games with double-digit tackles. In week 11, Thomas injured his shoulder and was inactive for the next two games (weeks 12–13). On December 11, 2005, Thomas recorded 11 combined tackles (nine solo), broke up a pass, and intercepted a pass attempt by Chargers' quarterback Drew Brees as the Dolphins defeated the San Diego Chargers 23–21 in week 15. On December 19, 2005, it was announced that Thomas was selected to play in the 2006 Pro Bowl, marking his seventh Pro Bowl selection of his career. He tied for the third-most Pro Bowl appearances in club history; this is also the record for most Pro Bowl selections among all defensive players in the Dolphins' franchise history. Thomas finished his 10th season in 2005 with 158 combined tackles (104 solo), three pass deflections, two sacks, and two interceptions in 14 games and 14 starts.

==== 2006 ====
On January 23, 2006, the Miami Dolphins hired former Houston Texans' head coach Dom Capers as their new defensive coordinator. Capers opted to retain Thomas as the starting middle linebacker and named Channing Crowder and Donnie Spragan the starting outside linebackers.

In week 11, he collected 17 combined tackles (four solo) in a 24–20 victory against the Minnesota Vikings. A week later, he recorded six solo tackles, broke up a pass, and made two sacks on Lions'quarterback Jon Kitna during a 27–10 victory at the Detroit Lions in week 12. On December 17, 2006, Thomas recorded a career-high 21 combined tackles during a 21–0 loss at the Buffalo Bills in week 15. On December 20, 2006, Thomas was selected to play in the 2007 Pro Bowl as part of the AFC Roster. Thomas started all 16 games in 2006 and recorded a career-high 165 combined tackles (103 solo), nine passes defensed, three sacks, and an interception.

==== 2007 ====
On January 3, 2007, Miami Dolphins' head coach Nick Saban resigned from his position to accept the head coaching job with the University of Alabama in Tuscaloosa, Alabama. Saban resigned after repeatedly denying he would accept the position. The Dolphins hired the San Diego Chargers' offensive coordinator Cam Cameron. Cameron retained Dom Capers as the defensive coordinator and George Edwards as the linebackers' coach. Thomas remained the starting middle linebacker, alongside outside linebackers Channing Crowder and Joey Porter.

He started in the Miami Dolphins' season-opener at the Washington Redskins and collected a season-high 13 combined tackles (nine solo) and made one sack in their 16–13 loss. On September 16, 2007, Thomas recorded 10 combined tackles and broke up two passes before exiting the game due to a concussion he suffered while tackling Cowboys' fullback Oliver Hoyte in the third quarter of their 37–10 loss to the Cowboys. A concussion rendered him inactive for the next two games (Weeks 3–4). On October 21, 2007, Thomas was involved in a car collision and sustained another concussion during the accident. His repeated concussions caused Thomas to have migraine headaches that lingered until being placed on the injured reserve list. On December 4, 2007, the Miami Dolphins officially placed Thomas on injured reserve after he missed five games (Weeks 8–13) due to his repeated migraine headaches. On December 20, 2007, the Miami Dolphins hired Bill Parcells as their head of football operations. Thomas finished the 2007 season with 52 combined tackles (42 solo), two pass deflections, and a sack in five games and five starts.

On January 1, 2008, the Miami Dolphins fired head coach Cam Cameron after a 1–15 record. On February 14, 2008, the Miami Dolphins released Thomas after announcing that he no longer fit into their long-term plans and his contract was terminated. Thomas received offers from the Dallas Cowboys, New Orleans Saints, and New England Patriots.

=== Dallas Cowboys ===
On February 23, 2008, the Dallas Cowboys signed Thomas to a one-year, $3 million contract which included a signing bonus of $1 million. The signing of Thomas surprised media and observers, considering that he did not have the previous experience or the size to play in the Cowboys' 3-4 defense. After he joined the roster, the Cowboys traded linebacker Akin Ayodele to the Dolphins to clear space for Thomas to become a starter at inside linebacker. Thomas started alongside Bradie James and outside linebackers DeMarcus Ware and Greg Ellis. In week 4, he collected a season-high 12 combined tackles (six solo) during the Cowboys' 26–24 loss to the Washington Redskins. He finished the season with 94 combined tackles (65 solo), three pass deflections, and a sack in 16 games and 14 starts.

=== Kansas City Chiefs ===
An unrestricted free agent in the 2009 offseason, Thomas agreed to terms with the Kansas City Chiefs on April 11. The one-year contract was worth $2 million. He suffered a concussion early in training camp and was eventually released on September 5, after not playing in any exhibition games. In October, he filed a grievance against the Chiefs for releasing him without an injury settlement while recovering.

=== Retirement ===
External videos
- Zach Thomas' Retirement Press Conference

On May 18, 2010, the Dolphins signed Thomas to a one-day ceremonial contract, officially worth $1, to retire as a member of the team.

=== Awards ===
In addition to being a seven-time All-Pro selection by the Associated Press and a seven-time Pro Bowl selection, Thomas earned these awards and honors in his NFL career:

- NFL Defensive Rookie of the Month (October 1996)
- All-Rookie selection by College & Pro Football Newsweekly, The Football News, Pro Football Weekly and Pro Football Writers of America (1996)
- AFC Defensive Rookie of the Year (1996)
- Dolphins' 1996 Unsung Hero Award as selected by NFLPA
- Dolphins MVP and Newcomer of the Year by South Florida media (1996)
- AFC Defensive Player of the Month (September 1998)
- 2× NFL Alumni Association's Linebacker of the Year (1998, 2006)
- First-team All-Pro selection by the USA Today, College & Pro Football Newsweekly and Football Digest (1998)
- 1998 All-Madden Team (1998)
- 3× Dolphins' Leadership Award (1998, 1999, 2005)
- Weeks 1 & 16 2001 AFC Defensive Player of the Week (2001)
- Dolphins MVP by South Florida media and fans (2001)
- All-Iron Team as selected by CBS analyst Phil Simms (2001)
- PFWA Dolphins Chapter "Good Guy" Award (2001)
- First-team Pro Football Weekly All-AFC (2002)
- First-team Sports Illustrated All-Pro (2003)
- Second-team Football Digest All-Pro (2003)
- Week 14 AFC Defensive Player of the Week (2005)
- All-AFC selection by Pro Football Weekly and the Pro Football Writers of America (2006)

== Legacy and honors ==
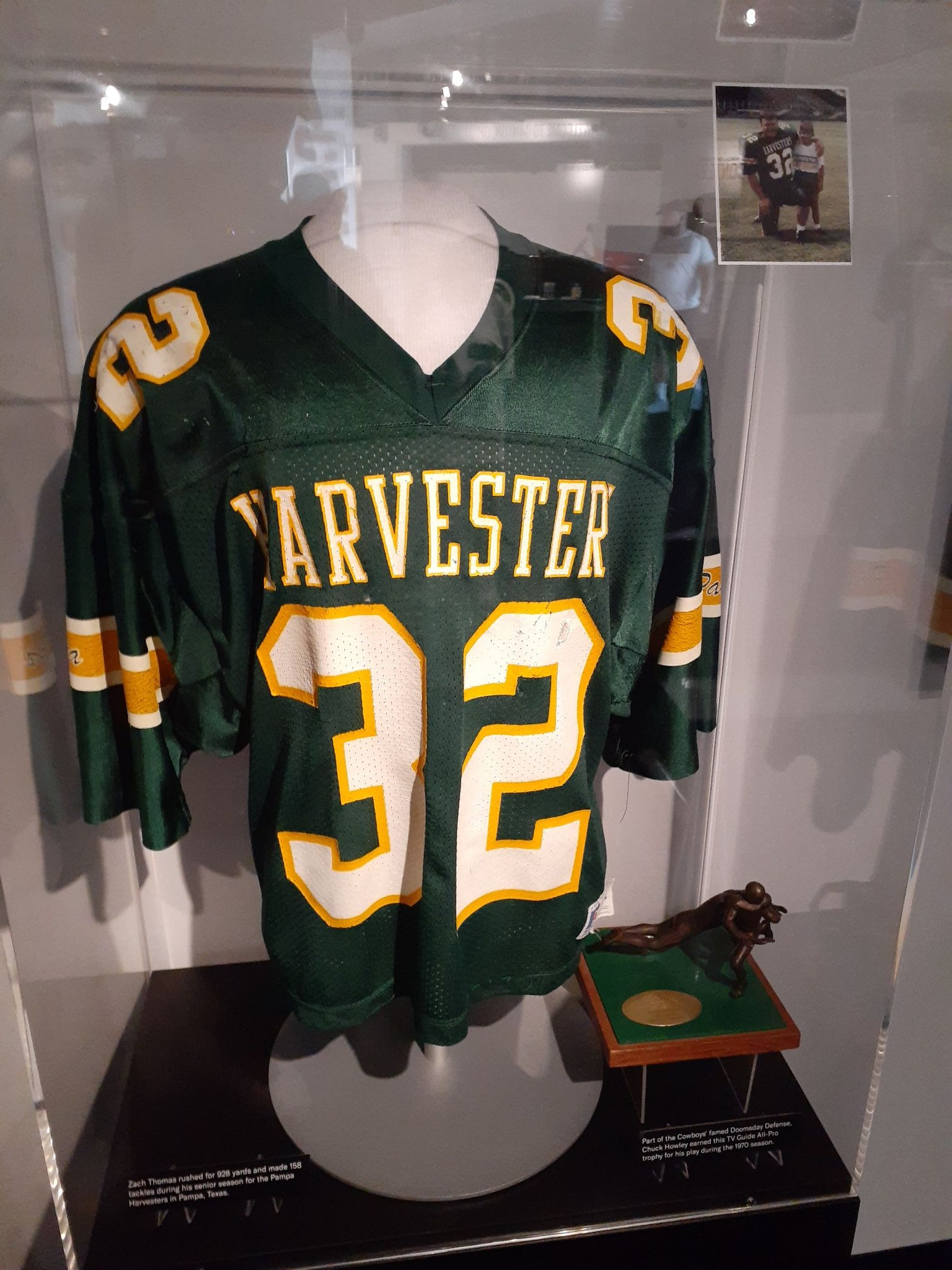
Thomas' high school football jersey on display at the Pro Football Hall of Fame

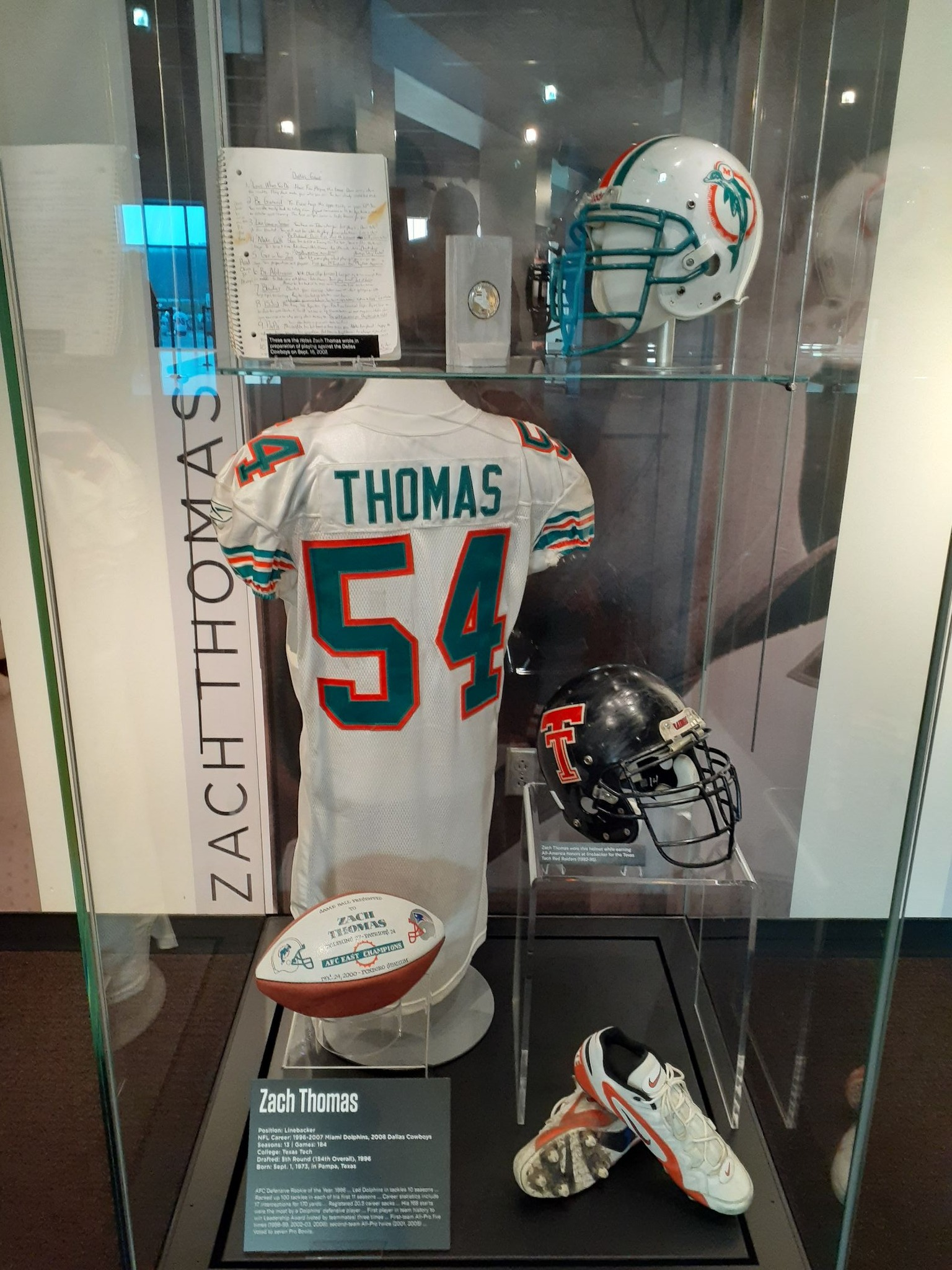
Thomas' "Class of 2023 Locker" on display at the Pro Football Hall of Fame

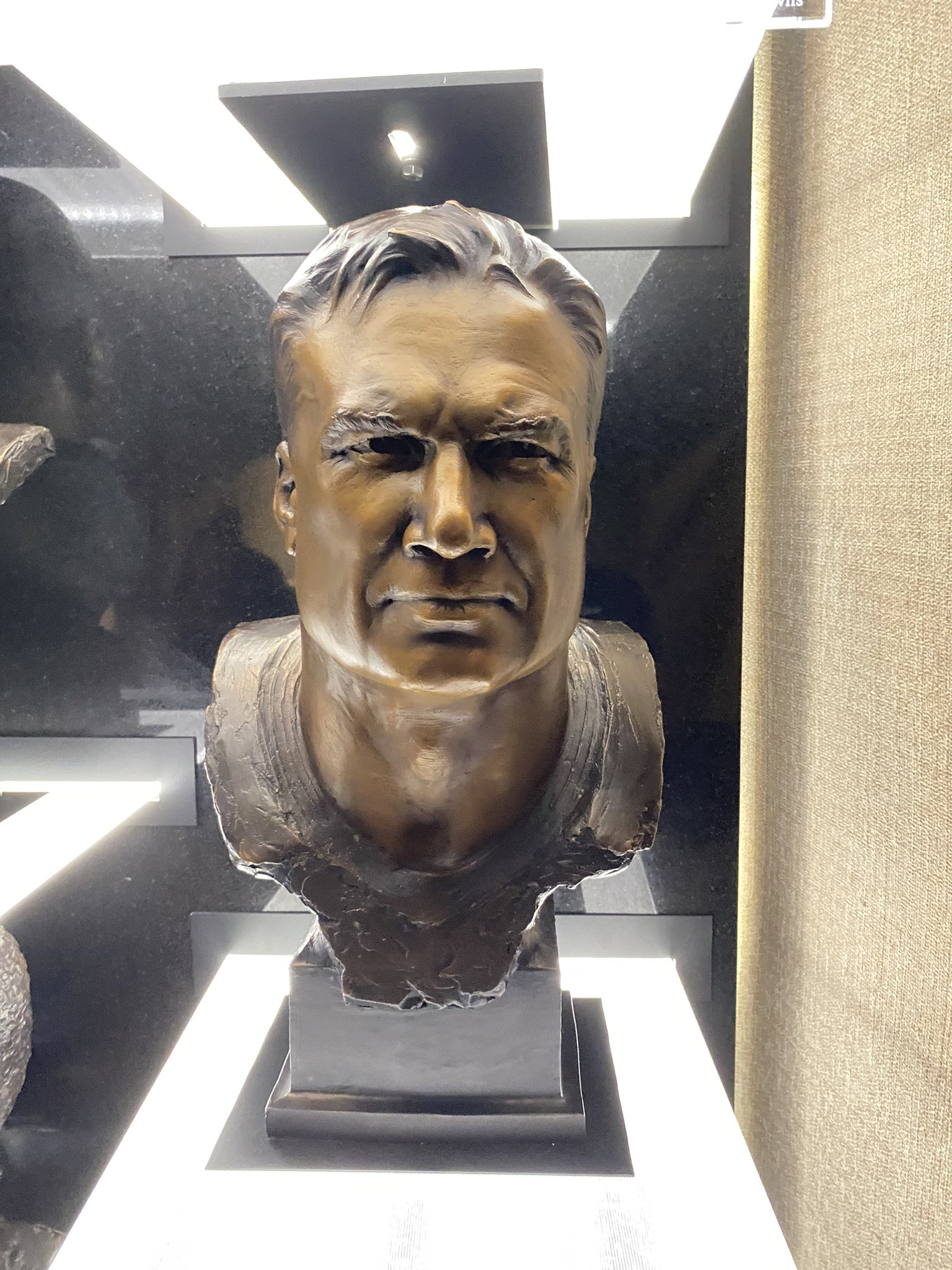
Thomas' bronze bust at the Pro Football Hall of Fame

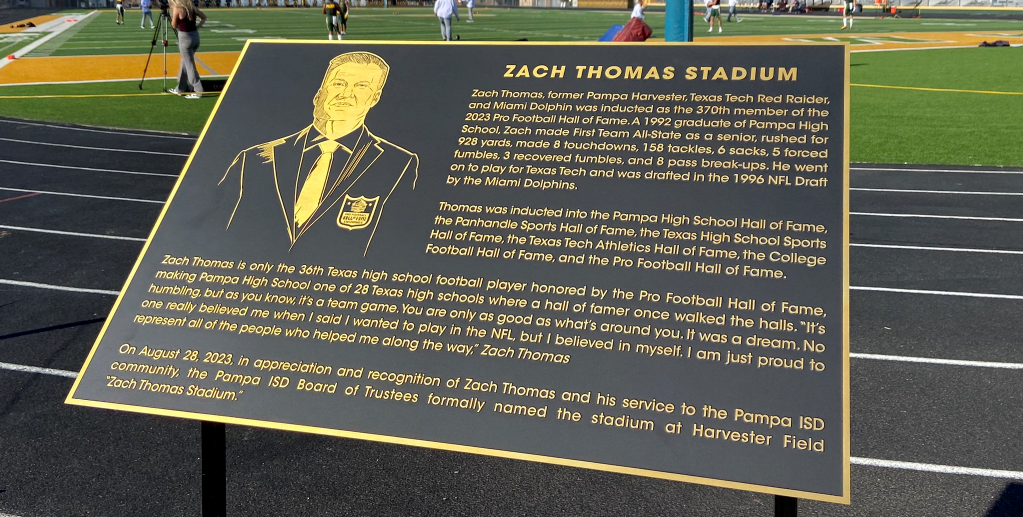
A commemorative plaque, honoring the renaming of the Pampa Texas High School Football Stadium to "Zach Thomas Stadium" at Harvester Field

Although some professional scouts viewed him as undersized and lacking ideal athletic speed for a linebacker entering the National Football League in 1996, Zach Thomas went on to build a long career marked by preparation, discipline, and leadership. He played 168 games for the Miami Dolphins, the second-highest total by a defensive player in franchise history, behind Jason Taylor, who appeared in 204 games.

Thomas ranks sixth on the NFL's all-time career tackles list with an official 1,734 career tackles. In 12 years with Miami, Thomas' consistency helped anchor a Miami defense that finished top 10 in total defense in eight out of his 12 seasons, including seven consecutive from 1998-2004. In five of those eight seasons, Thomas' defenses finished top five in total scoring defense, including first overall in 1998. He was a seven-time Pro Bowl selection, which is currently the most all-time for a Dolphins defensive player. Thomas was a five-time First Team All-Pro, two-time Second Team All-Pro, and two-time NFL Linebacker of the Year selected by the NFL Alumni association, and was selected to the NFL 2000s All-Decade Team. Thomas won numerous Miami Dolphin team awards, including two team MVP Awards (1996, 2001) and three Dolphins Team Leadership Awards (1998, 1999, 2005).

Thomas has been inducted into numerous Halls of Fame in his native "West Texas Panhandle", which include the Pampa High School Hall of Fame, the Panhandle Sports Hall of Fame, and the Texas High School Sports Hall of Fame. In 2006, Thomas was inducted into the Texas Tech Athletics Hall of Fame. In 2015, Thomas was inducted into the College Football Hall of Fame and the following year in 2016, was inducted into the Texas Tech Red Raiders Ring of Honor.

In 2012, Thomas was inducted into the Miami Dolphins Honor Roll alongside his teammate Jason Taylor. He is one of two Miami Dolphins (the other being Jason Taylor) where his jersey number (#54), while not officially retired, has not been reissued since his retirement. Thomas became eligible for the Pro Football Hall of Fame for the first time in 2014. He became a semifinalist for the first time in 2019. He then reached being a finalist for election the next three years from 2020 to 2022. After being a finalist for a fourth consecutive year in his 10th overall year of eligibility, on February 9, 2023, Zach Thomas was elected to the Pro Football Hall of Fame, and was formally enshrined on August 5, 2023.

In an interview with The Palm Beach Post, Thomas talked about having encountered auditory problems while in kindergarten. He had difficulties understanding differences in certain words. However, he credits his work ethic to starting at that time. He related how he had an alarm clock to go to bed in addition to one to wake up. “I knew if you’re going to be fresh the next day —you’re in a meeting room—then you’re going to focus better,” Thomas says. “That’s why I was getting nine or 10 hours of sleep. It was kind of a boring lifestyle, but I had an alarm clock to wake up and an alarm clock to go to bed, even. That alarm clock went off, I’m going to bed.”

In September 2024, the Pampa, Texas ISD Board of Trustees honored Zach Thomas by formally renaming his Pampa, Texas High School football stadium to "Zach Thomas Stadium" at Harvester Field.

== NFL career statistics ==
Legend
	Led the league
**Bold**	Career high

=== Regular season ===
Year	Team	Games		Tackles				Interceptions				Fumbles			
Year	Team	GP	GS	Cmb	Solo	Ast	Sck	Int	Yds	TD	PD	FF	FR	Yds	TD
1996	MIA	16	16	154	**120**	34	2.0	**3**	**64**	1	5	2	**2**	7	0
1997	MIA	15	15	128	78	50	0.5	1	10	0	8	2	0	0	0
1998	MIA	16	16	137	86	51	2.0	**3**	21	**2**	7	2	0	0	0
1999	MIA	16	16	134	85	49	1.0	1	0	0	9	1	0	0	0
2000	MIA	11	11	99	56	43	1.5	1	0	0	1	0	1	0	0
2001	MIA	15	15	155	95	60	**3.0**	2	51	1	4	2	0	0	0
2002	MIA	16	16	156	100	56	0.5	1	7	0	4	0	1	**22**	0
2003	MIA	15	15	153	85	**68**	1.0	**3**	21	0	**10**	1	**2**	0	0
2004	MIA	13	13	145	85	60	2.0	0	0	0	4	0	0	0	0
2005	MIA	14	14	162	107	55	2.0	1	0	0	3	**4**	1	0	0
2006	MIA	16	16	**165**	103	62	**3.0**	1	-4	0	8	2	0	0	0
2007	MIA	5	5	52	42	10	1.0	0	0	0	2	0	0	0	0
2008	DAL	16	14	94	65	29	1.0	0	0	0	3	0	1	0	0
Career		184	182	1,734	1,107	627	20.5	17	170	4	68	16	8	29	0

== Personal life ==
Thomas grew up in White Deer, Texas with his parents, Steve and Bobby Thomas. He has an older brother, Bart Thomas, and a younger sister, Katina Thomas. Katina was married to Thomas' Dolphins' teammate, Jason Taylor, from 2000 to 2015 and has three children with him. Thomas' father, Steve Thomas, is the builder and proprietor of the second largest cross in the Western Hemisphere, located in Groom, Texas. Zach Thomas and Maritza, his wife are married and they have three children. For the first three years of his career Thomas earned the league minimum and lived with teammate Larry Izzo.
