= Marcus Coleman =

American football player and coach (born 1974)

UTRGV Vaqueros
- Title: Special teams coordinator Cornerbacks coach

Personal information
- Born: May 24, 1974 (age 52); Dallas, Texas, U.S.
- Listed height: 6 ft 2 in (1.88 m)
- Listed weight: 209 lb (95 kg)

Career information
- Position: Defensive back (No. 42, 32)
- High school: Lake Highlands (Dallas)
- College: Texas Tech
- NFL draft: 1996: 5th round, 133rd overall pick
- Expansion draft: 2002: 1st round, 7th overall pick

Career history

Playing
- New York Jets (1996–2001); Houston Texans (2002–2005); Dallas Cowboys (2006)

Coaching
- Tri-Cities Fever (2016) Defensive backs coach; Iowa Barnstormers (2017–2018) Defensive coordinator and defensive backs coach; Tucson Sugar Skulls (2019) Head coach; West Texas Warbirds (2020) Head coach; Trinity (TX) (2021–2023) Special teams coordinator & defensive backs coach; UTRGV (2024–present) Special teams coordinator & cornerbacks coach

Awards and highlights
- As player: First-team All-American (1995); 2× First-team All-SWC (1994, 1995); All-Time Texas Tech Football Team (2008); Texas Tech Athletics Hall of Fame (2010); SWC Hall of Fame (2017); As coach: 2018 United Bowl champion

Career NFL statistics
- Tackles: 502
- Interceptions: 25
- Touchdowns: 2
- Stats at Pro Football Reference

Marcus Coleman (born May 24, 1974) is an American former professional football player who was a defensive back in the National Football League (NFL) for the New York Jets, Houston Texans and the Dallas Cowboys. He played college football for the Texas Tech Red Raiders.

In 2018, he was named the first head coach of the Indoor Football League (IFL)'s Tucson Sugar Skulls after serving as defensive coordinator with the Iowa Barnstormers during their championship season. The following season, he was hired as the head coach of the West Texas Warbirds based out of Odessa, Texas, in Champions Indoor Football. Marcus and his wife Lisa, live in Texas and have children, Nick, Gabriella, Jonathan, and a grandson Jaidon.

== Early life ==
Coleman attended Lake Highlands High School, receiving All-district and All-city honors as a safety. He also received All district, All-city, and All region honors in track

He accepted a scholarship from Texas Tech University. He started 36 straight games and was the first to play the "Raider position" (combination of outside linebacker-strong safety).

Coleman set the school and Southwest Conference career record with four interception returns for touchdowns and also left with the school record for blocked kicks in a season (3). He finished his college career with 256 tackles, 9 interceptions and 6 blocked kicks. He also received All-Conference honors, while competing in the long jump and the triple jump.

In 1995, Coleman earned All-American honors (1st Team: Football Writers Association of America, Dallas News, American Football Quarterly, 2nd Team: American Football Coaches Association, UPI). In 2008, he was named to the All-Time Texas Tech football team. In 2010, he was inducted into the Texas Tech Athletics Hall of Fame, and in 2017 was inducted into the Southwest Conference Hall of Fame.

== Playing career ==
Pre-draft measurables
Height	Weight	Arm length	Hand span	40-yard dash	10-yard split	20-yard split	20-yard shuttle	Vertical jump
6 ft 1 3/4 in (1.87 m)	208 lb (94 kg)	32 1/4 in (0.82 m)	9 3/8 in (0.24 m)	4.67 s	1.61 s	2.70 s	4.26 s	33.0 in (0.84 m)
All values from NFL Combine

=== New York Jets ===
Coleman was selected by the New York Jets in the fifth round (133rd overall) of the 1996 NFL draft and started four games at right cornerback as a rookie.

In 1997, he began to have issues with new head coach Bill Parcells, who moved him from free safety to cornerback. Parcells called him "The Wizard",

Coleman had a break-out year in 1999, becoming the starter at right cornerback after playing the first 4 games as a nickel back. He made 64 tackles, while leading the team with 6 interceptions (tied for sixth in the NFL) and 24 passes defensed.

The next year, he registered 56 tackles, 19 passes defensed (led the team) and 4 interceptions (second on the team), including a 98-yard pick-six against the Miami Dolphins, which at the time was the second-longest interception return in franchise history.

=== Houston Texans ===
Coleman was selected by the Houston Texans in the 2002 NFL expansion draft and was named the starter at right cornerback. He posted 90 tackles, 30 passes defensed (led the league), one interception and 2 fumble recoveries.

In 2003, he had 77 tackles and 23 passes defensed, while leading the team with 7 interceptions, which was a franchise record and tied him for fourth in the NFL. He received the AFC Defensive Player of the Month award for his performance in September.

In 2004, he was moved to free safety after the team drafted Dunta Robinson. He holds the Texans record for the longest interception return, with a 102-yard pick-six registered against the Kansas City Chiefs. On November 21, 2004, he suffered a sprained right shoulder against the Green Bay Packers and although he was able to play in the next two games, he was eventually placed on the injured reserve list, finishing with 80 tackles, 2 interceptions and 8 passes defensed.

The next year, he was deactivated for the game against the Baltimore Ravens for missing a walkthrough. He posted 11 starts, 66 tackles, one interception and 3 passes defensed. On February 28, 2006, he was released in a salary-cap move.

=== Dallas Cowboys ===
On April 18, 2006, Coleman was signed by the Dallas Cowboys as a free agent, reuniting him with his former Jets head coach Bill Parcells.He appeared in three games as a backup, before being released on November 11. He finished his career with 484 tackles, 25 interceptions, 119 passes defensed and 2 touchdowns.

== NFL career statistics ==
Legend
	Led the league
**Bold**	Career high

=== Regular season ===
Year	Team	Games		Tackles				Interceptions				Fumbles			
Year	Team	GP	GS	Comb	Solo	Ast	Sck	Int	Yds	TD	Lng	FF	FR	Yds	TD
1996	NYJ	13	4	31	25	6	0.0	1	23	0	23	**1**	0	0	0
1997	NYJ	16	2	10	8	2	0.0	1	24	0	24	0	1	0	0
1998	NYJ	14	0	6	5	1	0.0	0	0	0	0	0	0	0	0
1999	NYJ	16	10	69	57	12	0.0	6	**165**	**1**	98	0	1	0	0
2000	NYJ	16	16	62	56	6	0.0	4	6	0	7	0	0	0	0
2001	NYJ	16	15	71	60	11	0.0	2	41	0	36	**1**	1	0	0
2002	HOU	16	16	**73**	**61**	12	0.0	1	0	0	0	0	**2**	**8**	0
2003	HOU	15	15	70	57	**13**	0.0	**7**	95	0	41	**1**	0	0	0
2004	HOU	12	12	56	45	11	0.0	2	116	**1**	**102**	0	0	0	0
2005	HOU	15	11	53	47	6	0.0	1	6	0	6	**1**	0	0	0
2006	DAL	3	0	1	1	0	0.0	0	0	0	0	0	0	0	0
		152	101	502	422	80	0.0	25	476	2	102	4	5	8	0

=== Playoffs ===
Year	Team	Games		Tackles				Interceptions				Fumbles			
Year	Team	GP	GS	Comb	Solo	Ast	Sck	Int	Yds	TD	Lng	FF	FR	Yds	TD
1998	NYJ	2	0	4	4	0	0.0	0	0	0	0	0	0	0	0
2001	NYJ	1	1	**10**	**10**	0	0.0	0	0	0	0	0	0	0	0
		3	1	14	14	0	0.0	0	0	0	0	0	0	0	0

== Coaching career ==
Coleman's first coaching stint was as the defensive backs coach for the Tri-Cities Fever of the Indoor Football League in 2016. On September 16, 2016, Coleman was announced as the new defensive backs coach and defensive coordinator for the Iowa Barnstormers. On September 12, 2018, after two seasons with the Barnstormers, he was announced as the inaugural head coach for the Tucson Sugar Skulls. Coleman then was hired as the first head coach of the West Texas Warbirds in Odessa, Texas, and a member of Champions Indoor Football for the 2020 season. However, the 2020 CIF season was cancelled without playing a game due to the onset of the COVID-19 pandemic. Coleman resigned from the Warbirds in October 2020. Coleman is currently and Assistant Coach/Defensive Backs Coach at Trinity University in San Antonio, Texas.
