= Fred Miller (American football, born 1973) =

American football player and coach (born 1973)

No. 69, 71, 73
- Position: Offensive tackle

Personal information
- Born: February 6, 1973 (age 53); Houston, Texas, U.S.
- Listed height: 6 ft 7 in (2.01 m)
- Listed weight: 320 lb (145 kg)

Career information
- High school: Eisenhower (Houston)
- College: Baylor
- NFL draft: 1996: 5th round, 141st overall pick

Career history

Playing
- St. Louis Rams (1996–1999); Tennessee Titans (2000–2004); Chicago Bears (2005–2008)

Coaching
- North Shore Country Day School (2011) Assistant coach; North Shore Country Day School (2012) Co-head coach

Awards and highlights
- Super Bowl champion (XXXIV); 2× First-team All-SWC (1994, 1995)

Career NFL statistics
- Games played: 192
- Games started: 164
- Fumble recoveries: 4
- Stats at Pro Football Reference

Fred Miller (born February 6, 1973) is an American former professional football player who was an offensive tackle in the National Football League (NFL). He most recently played for the Chicago Bears of the National Football League (NFL). He was selected by the St. Louis Rams in the fifth round of the 1996 NFL draft. He played college football for the Baylor Bears.

== NFL playing career ==
Miller was expected to struggle with Tennessee Titans rookie sensation Jevon Kearse in Super Bowl XXXIV, having given up several sacks to Kearse in the regular season match up between the teams. In Super Bowl XXXIV, Miller gave up no sacks (with the exception of one that was negated by a Kearse penalty) in the Rams' 23–16 championship win. Miller had the distinction of making the Rams' first reception of the game on a tipped pass, an unusual accomplishment for an offensive lineman. It would be Miller's final game with the Rams, as he signed with the Rams' Super Bowl opponent—the Titans—for the 2000 season.

In 2005, Chicago Bears teammate Olin Kreutz broke Miller's jaw in an altercation. The team had originally stated, "Fred Miller broke his jaw while getting out of bed in the middle of the night." Both players were fined $50,000 by the NFL.

On February 18, 2008, the Bears released him. He was re-signed by the Bears a week into the regular season on September 10.

== Coaching career ==
Miller was an assistant coach of the varsity football team at North Shore Country Day School in Winnetka, Illinois for the 2011 season. In 2011, he helped the school to a 9–2 record and one of the best seasons in school history, a mere three seasons after the team finished their 2008 season with an 0–9 record. In 2012, he was promoted to co-head coach. Miller also coached for the North Shore Titans youth football program in Glencoe, Illinois previously.
