= 1997 Detroit Lions season =

NFL team season

- Owner: William Clay Ford Sr.
- General manager: Chuck Schmidt
- Head coach: Bobby Ross
- Offensive coordinator: Sylvester Croom
- Defensive coordinator: Larry Peccatiello
- Home stadium: Pontiac Silverdome

Results
- Record: 9–7
- Division place: 3rd NFC Central
- Playoffs: Lost Wild Card Playoffs (at Buccaneers) 10–20
- All-Pros: 4: WR Herman Moore (1st team); RB Barry Sanders (1st team); DE Robert Porcher (1st team); K Jason Hanson (2nd team)
- Pro Bowlers: 5: WR Herman Moore; RB Barry Sanders; DT Luther Elliss; DE Robert Porcher; K Jason Hanson

Uniform

The 1997 Detroit Lions season was their 68th in the National Football League (NFL).

The Lions rebounded from a disastrous 1996 season, finishing 9–7 and qualifying for the playoffs for the fifth time in seven seasons – the best stretch in franchise history.

Bobby Ross replaced Wayne Fontes as head coach. The highlight of the season was Barry Sanders having one of the greatest seasons for a running back in NFL history. He became the third player in NFL history to rush for at least 2,000 yards in a season. Sanders shared the 1997 Associated Press MVP Award with Packers quarterback Brett Favre.

As a team, the Lions set an NFL rushing record, gaining 5.51 yards per rushing attempt. The Lions scored 379 points in 1997, the fourth-most of any team in the league.

== Offseason ==
=== NFL draft ===
1997 Detroit Lions draft
Round	Pick	Player	Position	College	Notes
1	5	Bryant Westbrook	Cornerback	Texas	
2	35	Juan Roque	Tackle	Arizona State	
2	54	Kevin Abrams	Cornerback	Syracuse	
4	130	Matt Russell	Linebacker	Colorado	
5	135	Pete Chryplewicz	Tight end	Notre Dame	
5	161	Duane Ashman	Defensive end	Virginia	
6	168	Tony Ramirez	Guard	Northern Colorado	
7	206	Terry Battle	Running back	Arizona State	
7	232	Marcus Harris	Wide receiver	Wyoming	
7	239	Richard Jordan	Linebacker	Missouri Southern	
Made roster * Made at least one Pro Bowl during career

=== Undrafted free agents ===
1997 Undrafted free agents of note
Player	Position	College
Chris Dittoe	Quarterback	Indiana

== Personnel ==
=== Staff ===
1997 Detroit Lions staff
Front office: Chairman and president – William Clay Ford Sr.; Vice chairman – William Clay Ford Jr.; Executive vice president and chief operating officer – Chuck Schmidt; Vice president of player personnel – Ron Hughes; Vice president of football administration – Larry Lee; Director of pro scouting – Kevin Colbert; Head coaches: Head coach – Bobby Ross; Offensive coaches: Offensive coordinator – Sylvester Croom; Quarterbacks – Marc Trestman; Running backs – Frank Falks; Wide receivers – Jerry Sullivan; Tight ends – Bob Palcic; Offensive line – Jack Henry; Quality Control–Offense/Administrative Assistant – John Misciagna	Defensive coaches: Defensive coordinator – Larry Peccatiello; Defensive line – Brian Baker; Linebackers – Gary Moeller; Secondary – Richard Selcer; Defensive assistant/assistant strength – Don Clemons; Quality Control–Defense – Dennis Murphy; Special teams coaches: Special teams – Chuck Priefer; Offensive/special teams assistant – Stan Kwan; Strength and conditioning: Strength and conditioning – Bert Hill

=== Roster ===
1997 Detroit Lions roster
Quarterbacks (QB): 12 Matt Blundin; 19 Scott Mitchell; 14 Frank Reich; Running backs (RB): 23 Terry Battle; 34 Ron Rivers; 20 Barry Sanders; 30 Cory Schlesinger FB; 44 Tommy Vardell FB; Wide receivers (WR): 80 Tommie Boyd; 83 Kez McCorvey; 33 Glyn Milburn; 84 Herman Moore; 87 Johnnie Morton; Tight ends (TE): 81 Pete Chryplewicz; 89 Pete Metzelaars; 86 David Sloan; 82 Eric Stocz	Offensive linemen (OL): 79 Eric Beverly; 77 Mike Compton G/T; 53 Kevin Glover C; 64 Jeff Hartings G; 66 Hessley Hempstead G; 70 Andre Johnson T; 75 Tony Ramirez T; 72 Ray Roberts T; 62 Tony Semple; 71 Larry Tharpe T; Defensive linemen (DL): 96 Shane Bonham DT; 94 Luther Elliss DT; 67 Travis Kirschke DT; 91 Robert Porcher DE; 97 Tracy Scroggins DE; 92 Marc Spindler DT; 98 Marvin Thomas DE; 95 Mike Wells DT	Linebackers (LB): 57 Stephen Boyd MLB; 59 Reggie Brown OLB; 58 George Jamison OLB; 99 Richard Jordan MLB; 52 Scott Kowalkowski OLB; 51 Antonio London OLB; 54 Matt Russell MLB; Defensive backs (DB): 24 Kevin Abrams CB; 35 Robert Bailey CB; 27 Mark Carrier S; 25 Greg Jeffries CB; 38 Daryl Porter CB; 31 Corey Raymond CB; 28 Ron Rice SS; 42 Ryan Stewart S; 32 Bryant Westbrook CB; Special teams (ST): 4 Jason Hanson K; 18 John Jett P	Practice squad: 69 Jerome Davis T; 8 Deon Maddox WR; -- Shawn Swayda DE; 45 Cyrill Weems CB; 53 active, 6 inactive, 4 practice squad Reserve: 51 Tom Beer LB (IR); 29 Harry Colon S (IR); 74 Chris Harrison G (IR); 39 Van Malone S (IR); 73 Juan Roque T (IR); 93 Kerwin Waldroup DE (IR); Rookies in italics

== Regular season ==
The final game of the regular season, on December 21, was marked by emotional highs and lows. Entering the game at 8–7 and needing a win to secure a playoff berth, the Lions played host to the 9–6 New York Jets, who like the Lions would be eliminated from the playoffs with a loss (although the Jets still had a chance to win the AFC East and get a home playoff game). In addition, Barry Sanders entered the game with a chance to potentially break the NFL’s single season rushing record – Sanders entered the game with 1,869 rushing yards, leaving him 131 from 2,000 and 237 away from what would have been a record setting 2,106 yards, topping Eric Dickerson’s 2,105 set in 1984. The Lions won the game 13–10, clinching the playoff spot and eliminating the Jets from the playoffs. A fourth-quarter touchdown run by Sanders proved decisive, and he finished with 184 yards to top out at 2,053 for the year – with Sanders rushing for an even 2,000 yards over the final 14 games. Sanders became only the third man to rush for 2,000 yards in a season after O. J. Simpson and Dickerson and had rushed for the second most yards in a season (since then Terrell Davis, Jamal Lewis, Chris Johnson, and Adrian Peterson have accomplished the feat; through the 2021 season, Sanders’ total is the fourth highest total behind Dickerson's 2,105, Peterson’s 2,096 in 2012, and Lewis’ 2,066 in 2003).

The mood, however, was somewhat tempered due to a career-ending injury suffered by Lions’ linebacker Reggie Brown. Brown was assisting on a tackle made on Jets running back Adrian Murrell when his head was struck by another player's leg. Brown suffered a spinal cord injury on the play and lost consciousness. At one point Brown actually stopped breathing and nearly died on the field, but was resuscitated. Brown did not move for seventeen minutes, and was eventually carried by ambulance out of the Silverdome. Brown was diagnosed with a spinal cord contusion and never played in the NFL again, although surgery did enable him to continue to be mobile. Brown's injury evoked memories of former Lion Mike Utley's paralyzing injury in 1991 and former Jet Dennis Byrd’s broken neck in 1992. Brown was also not the only Lion to suffer a career ending neck injury in 1997, as defensive back Harry Colon suffered damage to his neck during an earlier game against the New York Giants.

=== Schedule ===
Week	Date	Opponent	Result	Record	Attendance
1	August 31	Atlanta Falcons	**W** 28–17	1–0	61,244
2	September 7	**Tampa Bay Buccaneers**	**L** 24–17	1–1	58,234
3	September 14	at **Chicago Bears**	**W** 32–7	2–1	59,147
4	September 21	at New Orleans Saints	**L** 35–17	2–2	50,116
5	September 28	**Green Bay Packers**	**W** 26–15	3–2	78,110
6	October 5	at Buffalo Bills	**L** 22–13	3–3	78,025
7	October 12	at **Tampa Bay Buccaneers**	**W** 27–9	4–3	72,095
8	October 19	New York Giants	**L** 26–20 _{(OT)}	4–4	70,069
9	Bye				
10	November 2	at **Green Bay Packers**	**L** 20–10	4–5	60,126
11	November 9	at Washington Redskins	**L** 30–7	4–6	75,261
12	November 16	**Minnesota Vikings**	**W** 38–15	5–6	68,910
13	November 23	Indianapolis Colts	**W** 32–10	6–6	62,803
14	November 27	**Chicago Bears**	**W** 55–20	7–6	77,904
15	December 7	at Miami Dolphins	**L** 33–30	7–7	72,266
16	December 14	at **Minnesota Vikings**	**W** 14–13	8–7	60,982
17	December 21	New York Jets	**W** 13–10	9–7	77,624
Note: Intra-division opponents are in **bold** text.

=== Game summaries ===
==== Week 17 ====
Team	1	2	3	4	Total
Jets	10	0	0	0	10
• **Lions**	0	3	3	7	13

- Date: December 21
- Location: Pontiac Silverdome • Detroit, Michigan
- Game start: 4:00 p.m.
- Game weather: indoors (dome)
- TV announcers (NBC): Dick Enberg, Phil Simms and Paul Maguire

Scoring summary
1	NYJ	John Hall 32-yard field goal	Jets 3–0
1	NYJ	Adrian Murrell 14-yard run (John Hall kick)	Jets 10–0
2	DET	Jason Hanson 44-yard field goal	Jets 10–3
3	DET	Jason Hanson 25-yard field goal	Jets 10–6
4	DET	Barry Sanders 15-yard run (Jason Hanson kick)	Lions 13–10

=== Standings ===
NFC Central
	W	L	T	PCT	PF	PA	STK
^{(2)} Green Bay Packers	13	3	0	.813	422	282	W5
^{(4)} Tampa Bay Buccaneers	10	6	0	.625	299	263	W1
^{(5)} Detroit Lions	9	7	0	.563	379	306	W2
^{(6)} Minnesota Vikings	9	7	0	.563	354	359	W1
Chicago Bears	4	12	0	.250	263	421	L1

== Playoffs ==
=== NFC Wild Card Game: at Tampa Bay Buccaneers ===
NFC Wild Card Game: Detroit Lions at Tampa Bay Buccaneers – Game summary

Quarter	1	2	3	4	Total
Lions	0	0	3	7	10
Buccaneers	3	10	7	0	20

at Houlihan's Stadium, Tampa, Florida

- Game time: 4:00 p.m. EST
- Game weather: 57 °F or 13.9 °C, partly cloudy
- Game attendance: 73,361
- Referee: Mike Carey
- TV announcers (Fox): Pat Summerall and John Madden

Tampa Bay won their first playoff game since 1979 with quarterback Trent Dilfer's 9-yard touchdown pass to receiver Horace Copeland, running back Mike Alstott's 31-yard touchdown run, and two field goals. Their defense limited Lions quarterback Scott Mitchell to just 10 of 25 completions for 78 yards.

== Awards and honors ==
- Barry Sanders, NFL MVP
- Barry Sanders, NFL Offensive Player of the Year
