= Ray Mickens =

German gridiron football player (born 1973)

No. 24, 23, 38
- Position: Cornerback

Personal information
- Born: January 4, 1973 (age 53); Frankfurt, Germany
- Listed height: 5 ft 8 in (1.73 m)
- Listed weight: 180 lb (82 kg)

Career information
- High school: Andress (El Paso, Texas, U.S.)
- College: Texas A&M
- NFL draft: 1996: 3rd round, 62nd overall pick

Career history
- New York Jets (1996–2004); Cleveland Browns (2005); New York Jets (2006)*; New England Patriots (2006)
- * Offseason or practice squad member only

Awards and highlights
- First-team All-American (1995); 3× First-team All-SWC (1993, 1994, 1995)

Career NFL statistics
- Tackles: 382
- Sacks: 6
- Forced fumbles: 5
- Fumble recoveries: 4
- Interceptions: 11
- Touchdowns: 1
- Stats at Pro Football Reference

William Ray Mickens (born January 4, 1973) is a former professional American football cornerback. Mickens entered the National Football League (NFL) after receiving All-American honors at Texas A&M University. He last played professionally for the New England Patriots. His brother Fred Williams played for the Houston Oilers. Post-NFL Ray Mickens owns (along with Leonard Mickens) M2 Concepts a privately held, minority owned food, beverage, and retailing company headquartered in Dallas/Ft. Worth area.

== Early life and college ==
Mickens grew up in El Paso, Texas, where he attended Andress High School and was a Division 1-5A All-State running back in the 1990, 1991 football seasons. While in high school, he played against the Midland Lee Rebels football team to capture the Regional Championship.

Mickens played football and was a sprinter on the track and field team at Texas A&M University. He was one of the top coverage cornerbacks in the country and was an All-American and All-Southwest Conference player in both his junior and senior years. He had four interceptions and broke up three other passes during his senior year. In spite of his relatively diminutive size, Mickens also handled run support well with 59 total tackles. He was also among the top punt returners in the nation that year with an 11.7 yard average. In the last game of his career, an Alamo Bowl victory against Michigan, he shut down the Wolverine receivers, switching positions when necessary to stop the "hot" receiver. For his career, he had 162 tackles and nine interceptions for Texas A&M. He started the final 34 games of his college career and finished his career 4th on A&M's all-time passes defended list.

== Professional career ==
Pre-draft measurables
Height	Weight	Arm length	Hand span	40-yard dash	10-yard split	20-yard split	Vertical jump	Bench press
5 ft 7 5/8 in (1.72 m)	176 lb (80 kg)	29 1/4 in (0.74 m)	9 1/4 in (0.23 m)	4.47 s	1.53 s	2.54 s	37.5 in (0.95 m)	12 reps

Mickens was drafted in the third-round by the New York Jets in the 1996 NFL draft. He played for the Jets from 1996 to 2004. Mickens only sat out two games in his first eight NFL seasons before missing the 2004 season because of a torn ACL. He built a reputation as one of the top nickel backs in the NFL and also a very capable starter. He played in 126 games with 36 starts over the course of his first eight seasons while registering 365 tackles, 79 passes defended, 11 INT, four forced fumbles and six sacks. Mickens was released by the Jets. He signed a one-year contract with the Browns as a free agent prior to the 2005 season and played in all 16 games, starting three, and recording 33 tackles and 16 passes defended.

Mickens signed with the Jets once again on May 31, 2006, but was eventually waived when rosters were reduced to the 53 men following the last pre-season game. He was signed by the New England Patriots in December 2006 and was a prominent player in their run to the division championship game. He filed for free agency on March 3, 2007.

== NFL career statistics ==
Legend
**Bold**	Career high

=== Regular season ===
Year	Team	Games		Tackles				Interceptions				Fumbles			
Year	Team	GP	GS	Comb	Solo	Ast	Sck	Int	Yds	TD	Lng	FF	FR	Yds	TD
1996	NYJ	15	10	44	37	7	0.0	0	0	0	0	0	0	0	0
1997	NYJ	16	0	26	25	1	1.0	**4**	2	0	2	**2**	0	0	0
1998	NYJ	16	4	34	30	4	0.0	3	10	0	10	0	**1**	0	0
1999	NYJ	15	5	44	36	8	**2.0**	2	2	0	2	**2**	0	0	0
2000	NYJ	16	0	28	25	3	0.0	0	0	0	0	0	0	0	0
2001	NYJ	16	4	**66**	**56**	**10**	1.0	0	0	0	0	1	**1**	0	0
2002	NYJ	16	1	41	34	7	**2.0**	0	0	0	0	0	**1**	0	0
2003	NYJ	16	14	64	54	**10**	0.0	2	**16**	0	**16**	0	0	0	0
2005	CLE	16	0	33	26	7	0.0	0	0	0	0	0	**1**	**13**	0
2006	NE	4	0	2	0	2	0.0	0	0	0	0	0	0	0	0
		146	38	382	323	59	6.0	11	30	0	16	5	4	13	0

=== Playoffs ===
Year	Team	Games		Tackles				Interceptions				Fumbles			
Year	Team	GP	GS	Comb	Solo	Ast	Sck	Int	Yds	TD	Lng	FF	FR	Yds	TD
1998	NYJ	2	2	3	3	0	0.0	0	0	0	0	0	0	0	0
2001	NYJ	1	0	1	1	0	0.0	0	0	0	0	0	0	0	0
2002	NYJ	2	0	**10**	**9**	**1**	0.0	0	0	0	0	**1**	**1**	0	0
2006	NE	3	0	3	3	0	0.0	0	0	0	0	0	0	0	0
		8	2	17	16	1	0.0	0	0	0	0	1	1	0	0

== Personal life ==
His brother Fred Williams played for the 1993 Houston Oilers. His daughter, Kamray Mickens, played point guard for Southern Methodist University and his niece Asia Mickens-Perez is a midfielder for Howard University Women's Soccer team.

Mickens won the 1999 Madden Bowl.

His son, R. J. Mickens was a college football safety for the Clemson Tigers and was drafted by the Los Angeles Chargers as the 214th pick in the 2025 NFL draft.
