= Billy Milner =

American football player (born 1972)

No. 79, 77
- Position: Offensive tackle

Personal information
- Born: June 21, 1972 (age 54); Atlanta, Georgia, U.S.
- Listed height: 6 ft 5 in (1.96 m)
- Listed weight: 304 lb (138 kg)

Career information
- High school: Northside (Atlanta, Georgia)
- College: Houston
- NFL draft: 1995: 1st round, 25th overall pick

Career history
- Miami Dolphins (1995–1996); St. Louis Rams (1996–1997)

Awards and highlights
- Second-team All-SWC (1994)

Career NFL statistics
- Games played: 30
- Games started: 9
- Fumble recoveries: 2
- Stats at Pro Football Reference

Willie Perry Milner (born June 21, 1972) is an American former professional football player who was an offensive tackle in the National Football League (NFL). He attended Northside High School in Atlanta. Milner attended the University of Houston, where he was a third-team college All-American and the team's MVP. He was selected 25th in the first round of the 1995 NFL draft by the Miami Dolphins. He started 9 games as a rookie, earning a spot on the all rookie team. He was traded to the St. Louis Rams his second season for tight end Troy Drayton and suffered a career ending neck injury in his third season derailing a promising career. Milner now resides in Sunrise, Florida, with his wife Sabrina and daughter Breana, he also has a son (Maxwell) who lives in Houston, Texas.
