= Byron Hanspard =

American football player (born 1976)

No. 28, 24
- Position: Running back

Personal information
- Born: January 23, 1976 (age 50); Dallas, Texas, U.S.
- Listed height: 5 ft 10 in (1.78 m)
- Listed weight: 198 lb (90 kg)

Career information
- High school: DeSoto (DeSoto, Texas)
- College: Texas Tech
- NFL draft: 1997: 2nd round, 41st overall pick

Career history
- Atlanta Falcons (1997–1999); Tampa Bay Buccaneers (2000–2002)

Awards and highlights
- PFWA All-Rookie Team (1997); Doak Walker Award (1996); Unanimous All-American (1996); First-team All-Big 12 (1996); First-team All-SWC (1995); Second-team All-SWC (1994)

Career NFL statistics
- Rushing yards: 718
- Rushing average: 3.8
- Receptions: 16
- Receiving yards: 146
- Total touchdowns: 4
- Kick return yards: 987
- Stats at Pro Football Reference

Byron Courtnay Hanspard, Sr. (born January 23, 1976) is an American former professional football player who was a running back for six seasons in the National Football League (NFL). He played college football for the Texas Tech Red Raiders, earning unanimous All-American honors and winning the Doak Walker Award as the nation's top college running back. A second-round pick in the 1997 NFL draft, he played professionally for the NFL's Atlanta Falcons and Tampa Bay Buccaneers.

== Early life ==
Hanspard was born in Dallas, Texas. He attended DeSoto High School in DeSoto, Texas, and played high school football for the DeSoto Eagles.

== College career ==
Hanspard attended Texas Tech University, where he played for the Red Raiders from 1994 to 1996. As freshman in 1994, he recorded 761 yards rushing on 173 carries. In the following season, he had 1,374 yards on 248 carries. In 1996, he accumulated 2,084 yards rushing (and a total of 2,276 all-purpose yards). He was one of two running backs to rush for 2,000 yards that year, the other being Troy Davis. However, Hanspard edged out Davis for the Walker Award in part because he played on a winning team. He was recognized as a unanimous first-team All-American, and finished sixth in the voting for the 1996 Heisman Trophy. He was only the third Red Raider to be named a unanimous All-American, after Mark Bounds in 1991 and Zach Thomas in 1995. He has since been joined by Michael Crabtree in 2007-08 and Jace Amaro in 2013.

Hanspard is Texas Tech's all-time leader in career rushing yards (4,219 yards in three seasons) and rushing yards per game. He ranks second in career rushing attempts. He also holds school records for single-season rushing attempts (339 in 1996) and most yards in a single game (287 against Baylor in 1996—one of seven career 200-yard games). He also ranks second in career rushing attempts and is in a four-way tie for seventh in single-season and career touchdowns.

Hanspard announced shortly after the end of the 1996 season that he would give up his last year of eligibility and enter the 1997 NFL draft. An ordained Pentecostal minister, he said that he felt the NFL gave him a better opportunity to expand his ministry. However, he later became the source of controversy after it emerged that he had all but abandoned his studies during what turned out to be his last year in school, posting a 0.00 grade point average for the 1996 fall semester. In part because of this, Texas Tech withdrew from bowl consideration in 1997. Hanspard did not return his Doak Walker Award, however.

More than two decades after leaving Texas Tech, Hanspard graduated from Texas A&M-Commerce in 2016 with a bachelor's degree in organizational leadership. He was working on a master's degree.

== Professional career ==
Hanspard was chosen in the second round (41st pick overall) by the Atlanta Falcons in the 1997 NFL Draft. He was used primarily as a kick returner in his rookie season, garnering 1,375 all-purpose yards, including 987 return yards. He also set a team record (since broken) for the longest run from scrimmage—a 77-yard burst against the Oakland Raiders. He suffered a severe knee injury during training camp in 1998 and missed the entire season. He returned in 1999 but was unable to return to his previous level of play. Despite increased playing time due to the loss of Jamal Anderson, he only gained 383 yards on 136 carries.

The Falcons cut him during training camp in 2000 after he lost a fumble in a preseason game. He signed with the Tampa Bay Buccaneers but did not make an appearance for them in the three years that he was on the roster.
