= Calvin Collins =

American football player (born 1974)

No. 65, 68, 61
- Position: Guard

Personal information
- Born: January 5, 1974 (age 52); Beaumont, Texas, U.S.
- Listed height: 6 ft 3 in (1.91 m)
- Listed weight: 307 lb (139 kg)

Career information
- High school: West Brook (Beaumont)
- College: Texas A&M
- NFL draft: 1997: 6th round, 180th overall pick

Career history
- Atlanta Falcons (1997–2000); Minnesota Vikings (2001); Houston Texans (2002)*; Pittsburgh Steelers (2003)*; Denver Broncos (2004)*
- * Offseason or practice squad member only

Awards and highlights
- PFWA All-Rookie Team (1997); First-team All-Big 12 (1996); First-team All-SWC (1994); Second-team All-SWC (1995)

Career NFL statistics
- Games played: 68
- Games started: 56
- Fumble recoveries: 1
- Stats at Pro Football Reference

Calvin Lewis Collins (born January 5, 1974) is an American former professional football player who was a guard for seven seasons in the National Football League (NFL) from 1997–2004. He played college football for the Texas A&M Aggies and was selected by the Atlanta Falcons in the sixth round of the 1997 NFL draft.

== Early life ==
Collins was born in Beaumont, Texas and played high school football at West Brook Senior High School in Beaumont where he was teammates with Frank Middleton and James Brown. He started on both offense and defense and earned Scholar Athlete of the Year honors his senior year. Collins also was a member of the National Honor Society and the West Brook Powerlifting team. Collins was the number one rated offensive lineman in the state in 1992 and ranked in the top ten also as a defensive lineman. After a whirlwind recruiting season, Collins chose Texas A&M over UCLA, Oklahoma, Michigan, Miami, Texas, and LSU.

== College career ==
Collins redshirted in 1993, but was among only two freshmen that traveled with the team as valuable reserves. In 1994 as a redshirt freshman, Collins started with 4 other seniors to form one of the best offensive lines in Texas A&M history. Calvin Collins led every offensive line for the next three years garnering impressive stats and awards. Collins was versatile enough to earn all-conference honors at both guard and center for the Aggies. Collins ended his college career with a trip to the Senior Bowl All-Star game where he dominated the trenches leading the team with 7 pancake blocks.

== Professional career ==
Calvin Collins was selected in the sixth round of the 1997 NFL draft by the Atlanta Falcons. Even though he was the 180th player picked, only one rookie offensive lineman started more games that year, and that was number one pick Orlando Pace. Collins earned the starting center spot four games into the rookie campaign gaining All-Rookie honors. In 1998 Collins switched to left guard and started every contest on the way to Super Bowl XXXIII. Collins helped pave the way for the Falcon's number one rushing offense that season and Jamal Anderson's 1,846 yards. Collins played 2 and half more years for the Falcons starting at guard and center. In 2001, Collins moved on to the Minnesota Vikings where his tenacity earned him the starting nod in the second half of the season. After signing up with the Houston Texans for 2002, he injured his hamstring during summer camp and was subsequently cut. After healing, Collins played with the Pittsburgh Steelers in 2003, and with the Denver Broncos in 2004.
