= Dan Neil (American football) =

American football player (born 1973)

No. 62
- Position: Guard

Personal information
- Born: October 21, 1973 (age 53); Houston, Texas, U.S.
- Listed height: 6 ft 2 in (1.88 m)
- Listed weight: 285 lb (129 kg)

Career information
- High school: Cypress Creek (Houston)
- College: Texas
- NFL draft: 1997: 3rd round, 67th overall pick

Career history
- Denver Broncos (1997–2004)

Awards and highlights
- 2× Super Bowl champion (XXXII, XXXIII); Consensus All-American (1996); First-team All-American (1995); First-team All-Big 12 (1996); First-team All-SWC (1995); Second-team All-SWC (1994)

Career NFL statistics
- Games played: 108
- Games started: 104
- Fumble recoveries: 2
- Stats at Pro Football Reference

Daniel Patrick Neil (born October 21, 1973) is an American former professional football player who spent his entire eight-year career as a guard for the Denver Broncos of the National Football League (NFL). He played college football for the Texas Longhorns, earning consensus All-American honors in 1996. He was selected by the Broncos in the third round of the 1997 NFL draft. Neil was a candidate for the Texas House of Representatives in the 2010 general election.

== Early life ==
Neil was born in Houston, Texas. He attended Cypress Creek High School in suburban Houston, where he played high school football for the Cypress Creek Cougars.

== College career ==
He accepted an athletic scholarship to attend the University of Texas at Austin, and played for the Texas Longhorns football team from 1993 to 1996. He was a first team All-American in 1995 and a consensus first-team All-American in 1996. He helped Texas win the last Southwest Conference Championship in 1995 and the first Big 12 one in 1996. In his senior year he was team captain, MVP, a semifinalist for the Lombardi Award and a finalist for the Outland Trophy.

== Professional career ==
The Denver Broncos selected Neil in the third round (67th pick overall) of the 1997 NFL draft. He played for the Broncos from 1997 to 2004. After seeing limited playing time as a rookie in 1997, he became a reliable starter on the Broncos' offensive line, starting in 104 of 108 games over the next seven seasons. He was the starter for the Broncos' NFL championship team in Super Bowl XXXIII and was on the team when they won Super Bowl XXXII, though he was inactive throughout most of the season, including the playoffs. He was a free agent after the 2000 season, but was signed again by the Broncos to a multi-year deal.

In the 2001 season, he was fined $15,000 for an illegal block that broke the leg of New England's Bryan Cox. No penalty was called on the play, but NFL director of football operations Gene Washington said Neil clipped the New England linebacker "from behind and below the knee." Cox vowed revenge for the hit, but did not follow through.

Neil was rarely injured, but missed the last two 2003 regular season games with a thumb injury and the end of the 2004 season, including Denver's playoff game, with knee and stomach injuries. Following the 2004 season, Neil was released by the Broncos.

== Life after football ==
In 2010, Neil was the Republican nominee for the 48th District of the Texas House of Representatives. His opponents were Democratic incumbent Donna Howard and Libertarian Ben Easton. The election returns showed Howard winning by 16 votes. Neil challenged the results in the Texas House. A select investigating committee found that although Howard had actually won by only four votes, Neil had not met the burden of proof required to overturn the election. Neil dropped the challenge on March 18, 2011, nearly halfway into the legislative session. Even with the 12 vote victory that the Secretary of State considers official, it is the closest Texas House race on record.

Prior to pursuing political aspirations, Neil co-hosted The Morning Rush with Erin Hogan on the Austin area ESPN Radio affiliate 104.9 The Horn.

Neil's son David played varsity football at Westlake High School in West Lake Hills, Texas, from 2015 into the 2018–2019 season.

Neil was inducted to the Texas Athletics Hall of Honor in 2008 and nominated to the College Football Hall of Fame in 2021, 2022 and 2023.
