= Reggie Brown (linebacker) =

American football player (born 1974)

No. 59
- Position: Linebacker

Personal information
- Born: September 28, 1974 (age 52); Austin, Texas, U.S.
- Listed height: 6 ft 2 in (1.88 m)
- Listed weight: 241 lb (109 kg)

Career information
- High school: Austin (TX) Reagan
- College: Texas A&M
- NFL draft: 1996: 1st round, 17th overall pick

Career history
- Detroit Lions (1996–1997)

Awards and highlights
- First-team All-SWC (1995)

Career NFL statistics
- GP / GS: 26 / 26
- Sacks: 2.5
- Interceptions: 2
- Stats at Pro Football Reference

Reginald Dwayne Brown (born September 28, 1974) is an American former professional football player who was a linebacker in the National Football League (NFL). He was selected in the first round (17th overall) of the 1996 NFL draft by the Detroit Lions. He played college football for the Texas A&M Aggies.

Brown suffered a spinal cord contusion in the final game of the 1997 season. The injury nearly left him paralyzed, and it ended his professional football career.

== College career ==
Brown played college football for Texas A&M. He earned first team All-Southwest Conference honors for his senior season efforts, during which he recorded 90 tackles and two interceptions.

== Professional career ==
Pre-draft measurables
Height	Weight	Arm length	Hand span	40-yard dash	10-yard split	20-yard split	20-yard shuttle	Vertical jump	Broad jump	Bench press
6 ft 2 in (1.88 m)	241 lb (109 kg)	32 1/4 in (0.82 m)	9 in (0.23 m)	4.53 s	1.54 s	2.58 s	4.06 s	33.0 in (0.84 m)	10 ft 0 in (3.05 m)	25 reps

Although not initially expected to be highly drafted, Brown's performance at the NFL combine boosted his stock. Brown was selected 17th overall by the Detroit Lions in the 1996 NFL draft. In his second season, he recorded 2.5 sacks to go along with two interceptions, both of which went for touchdown returns. Brown ultimately played in 26 games.

In his final game, Brown suffered a spinal cord contusion while assisting on a tackle of New York Jets halfback Adrian Murrell in the final game of the 1997 season, the same game that saw Barry Sanders cross the 2,000-yard mark for the season. He lay motionless for 17 minutes on the turf at the Pontiac Silverdome, briefly losing consciousness, with CPR saving his life. Emergency surgery, rehabilitation, and use of a special back brace saved him from using a wheelchair for the rest of his life.

== Post-football career ==
Brown is mobile and active. In November 2015, Brown gave a presentation hosted by Texas A&M's sports medicine department in which he detailed the recovery from his spinal cord injury.
