= Dykes (surname) =

Dykes is a British surname which is thought to originate from the hamlet of Dykesfield in Burgh-by-Sands, Cumbria in the north of England. Due to its close proximity to the English and Scottish borders, the surname Dykes has also been found in Scottish lowlands throughout the ages. The first family to bear the surname (for which written records survive) are said to have lived in the area prior to William the Conqueror's Norman conquest of England, with the oldest surviving written document placing them in Dykesfield at the end of the reign of Henry III. The family took their surname from Hadrian's Wall, also referred to in some texts as Hadrian's Dyke. The great wall crossed Great Britain from the mouth of the Tyne to the Solway Firth and forms part of the border for Dykesfield.

At this early period of history, however, the surname existed in a different form from the modern day; de la Dykes, literally meaning 'of the Dykes', indicating the region from where the family came. A charter, bearing the first known recorded instance of the surname, comes from either the reign of Henry III or Edward I, though the exact date of the record is unknown. It does, however, reveal that land owned by one Robert de la Dykes at Burgh was conveyed to one William del Monkys.

An alternative derivation for the name is that it is from the common personal name "Dick" (a diminutive of "Richard"). It would therefore share its origin with a number of similar names such as Dike, Dicks, Dix, Dickson, Dixon, Dickins, Dickens and Dickinson.

The earliest historical records are from a family which was moderately wealthy for the time. Robert del Dykes owned land during the reign of Edward I, and in 1379, during the reign of Richard II, Adam de la Dykes owned land further east in Yorkshire.

Another family member bearing the name William de la Dykes is noted as having represented the Earl of Cumberland in the English Parliament during the reign of Henry VI. More is known about this William than those who had previously bore the surname. Records indicate that he married Elizabeth, the daughter of William de Leigh, Lord of the Manor of High Leigh. William de la Dykes is also known to have received the manor and lands at Plumbland in Cumbria, England (also referred to as Warthole Hall and Wardale); subsequent generations would come to use the land but would later move to Dovenby Hall in Cumbria.

By the 17th century it appears that majority of those bearing the surname de la Dykes had dropped the prefix of 'de la' and had begun simply using the surname Dykes, as it is most commonly found today. Thomas Dykes is one such family member who was responsible for the formation of the family motto and symbol used by the majority of his descendants and others bearing the surname. Thomas, a Royalist at the time of the English Civil War during the reign of Charles I, secreted himself at Wardhall after the defeat of his party at the Battle of Marston Moor. Thomas is reputed to have hid in many areas of his land, including in a mulberry tree, which stands to this day at GPS coordinates 54.7328807,-3.3501848, while the house was demolished in the 1800s. It was all in vain, however, has he was soon captured by the Parliamentarians and imprisoned at Cockermouth Castle. Thomas was offered his freedom and the restoration of his property if he would become a traitor to his King by joining the Parliamentarians, but responded with Prius frangitur quam flectitur - Sooner broken than bent. Thomas died at Cockermouth Castle and, such was the strength of the story, the family adopted Prius frangitur quam flectitur as the family motto, and the mulberry tree as the family symbol.

While the surname had changed from del Dykes to Dykes by the 17th century further changes can be charted and, Dykes aside, other incarnations include Dawkes, Dyke, Dikes and Dike, though instances of the surname del Dykes can still be found.

It is still most common in the northern counties of the United Kingdom, particularly in Lancashire and Cheshire. Areas such as Liverpool and Warrington are some of the most populous to this day, records show that members of the family moved to these areas as early as the 18th century.

Outside of the United Kingdom, the surname can also be found in most parts of the Commonwealth and other former British Empire nations including Australia, the United States, Canada, New Zealand and Ireland (particularly Co. Sligo).

== People with the surname ==
- Adam Dykes (born 1977), Australian rugby league player
- Andrew Dykes (cricketer) (born 1971), Australian cricketer
- Andrew Dykes (rugby union), Scottish rugby player
- Ash Dykes (born 1990), Welsh adventurer and extreme athlete
- Beatrice Dykes (1894–1927), Welsh labour activist
- Bill Dykes (politician) (1923–2015), American politician from Louisiana
- Bill Dykes (born 1946), American gospel singer
- Casey Dykes (born 1990), American baseball coach
- Darren Dykes (born 1981), English footballer
- David O. Dykes (1953–2025), American Southern Baptist clergyman
- DeWitt Sanford Dykes Sr. (1903–1991), American architect, Methodist minister
- Donald Dykes (born 1955), American football player
- Doyle Dykes (born 1954), American country acoustic guitarist
- Eva Beatrice Dykes (1893–1986), first black American woman to fulfill the requirements for a doctoral degree
- Fretcheville Dykes (1800–1866), British politician
- Hart Lee Dykes (born 1966), American football player
- Hollie Dykes (born 1990), Australian gymnast
- Hugh Dykes, Baron Dykes (born 1939), British politician
- J. C. Dykes (1926–1993), American wrestler and manager
- James M. Dykes (1916–1966), American politician from Georgia
- James Oswald Dykes (1835–1912), Scottish Presbyterian clergyman
- Jimmy Dykes (1896–1976), American baseball player
- Jimmy Dykes (rugby union) (1901–1967), Scottish rugby player
- Jimmy Dykes (Scottish footballer), (1916–1974), Scottish football player
- Jimmy Dykes (sportscaster) (born 1961), American basketball sportscaster
- John Dykes (born 1964), British sports broadcaster
- John Dykes (rugby union) (1877–1955), Scottish rugby union player
- John Arthur St. Oswald Dykes (1863-1948), English pianist and teacher
- John Bacchus Dykes (1823–1876), English clergyman and hymn composer
- Keilen Dykes (born 1984), American football player
- Loren Dykes (born 1988), Welsh footballer
- Lyndon Dykes (born 1995), Scottish footballer
- Omar Kent Dykes (born 1950), American blues guitarist and singer
- Ross Dykes (1945–2020), New Zealand cricketer
- Sonny Dykes (born 1969), American football coach
- Spike Dykes (1938–2017), American football coach
- Brigadier Vivian Dykes (1898–1943), British soldier
- William Rickatson Dykes (1877–1925), amateur botanist and iris breeder
