= 1995 Sugar Bowl (December) =

1995 Nokia Sugar Bowl
- 62nd Sugar Bowl
Texas Longhorns	Virginia Tech Hokies
(10–1–1)	(9–2)
SWC	Big East
10	28
Head coach: John Mackovic	Head coach: Frank Beamer
AP / Coaches / BA; 9 / 6 / 6	AP / Coaches / BA; 13 / 11 / 11
	1	2	3	4	Total
Texas	7	3	0	0	10
Virginia Tech	0	7	7	14	28
- Date: December 31, 1995
- Season: 1995
- Stadium: Louisiana Superdome
- Location: New Orleans, Louisiana
- MVP: WR Bryan Still (Va. Tech)
- Favorite: Texas by 2.5 points (45)
- Referee: Michael Dover (ACC)
- Halftime show: The University of Texas Longhorn Band, Marching Virginians
- Attendance: 70,283
- Payout: US$8,300,000 per team

United States TV coverage
- Network: ABC
- Announcers: Mark Jones, Todd Blackledge, Dean Blevins
- Nielsen ratings: 6.3

The 1995 Sugar Bowl was the 62nd edition of the post-season American college football Sugar Bowl bowl game. It featured the Virginia Tech Hokies and the Texas Longhorns and was held at the Louisiana Superdome in New Orleans, Louisiana, on December 31, 1995. The game was the final contest of the 1995 NCAA Division I-A football season for both teams, and ended in a 28–10 victory for Virginia Tech.

In 1995, the Sugar Bowl was held under the rules of the Bowl Alliance. The Alliance, predecessor to the modern Bowl Championship Series, was intended to match the champions of the Southeastern Conference, Big East Conference, Atlantic Coast Conference, Big 12, Southwest Conference, and one at-large team against each other in the Sugar Bowl, Orange Bowl, and Fiesta Bowl. Each year, the two highest-ranked teams would play in a National Championship Game held in place of one of the bowl games. The site of the national championship game rotated among the three bowl games, as did the date of each game. Following the 1995 college football season, the Sugar Bowl was designated for December 31, marking the first time since 1972 (and the only time until 2022) two Sugar Bowls would be held in the same calendar year.

Virginia Tech was selected to play in the 1995 Sugar Bowl by virtue of winning the Big East football championship. The Hokies, who finished 9–2 during the regular season, actually were co-Big East champions. The University of Miami, which tied the Hokies, was ineligible for post-season play due to sanctions imposed as a result of recruiting rules violations. The Hokies played the University of Texas, which finished 10–1–1 during the regular season en route to becoming Southwest Conference champions. The Southwest Conference was scheduled to disband after the football season, but its champion was guaranteed one of the at-large spots in the Bowl Alliance.

The game was marred by the revelation that a Texas player had been competing under an assumed name. Other off-the-field incidents also took place prior to the game. Because the game was Virginia Tech's first trip to a major bowl game, ticket sales were brisk. Texas took an early lead in the competition and led 10–7 at halftime, but Virginia Tech's defense shut out Texas' offense in the second half and Tech scored 21 unanswered points. In recognition of his achievements in the game, Virginia Tech wide receiver Bryan Still was named the game's most valuable player.

== Team selection ==
In the 1995 college football season, teams were selected for the Sugar Bowl under the new Bowl Alliance system. The Bowl Alliance matched up the conference champions of the Big East, Southeastern Conference, Big 12 Conference, Atlantic Coast Conference, and two at-large teams in games to determine an official national champion. Prior to the introduction of the Bowl Alliance and its predecessor, the Bowl Coalition, national champions were determined by various college football polls that sometimes named different teams as champion.

Under the Alliance system, the two highest-ranked members of Alliance conferences were matched up in a national championship game. The lower-ranked conference champions and two-at large teams would play each other in other bowl games. In 1995, one of these at-large spots was reserved for the champion of the Southwest Conference, which had been a member of the Bowl Coalition but was scheduled to dissolve after the 1995 season. Its members joined different conferences in an attempt to increase their revenue.

The Fiesta Bowl hosted the national championship game for the 1995 season, and thus had the first and second pick of eligible Bowl Alliance teams. The Orange Bowl had the third and fifth selections, while the Sugar Bowl had the fourth and sixth picks. The three Bowl Alliance games each were assigned a different date: December 31, January 1, or January 2. The dates rotated among the three games, along with which game would host the national championship. The Sugar Bowl was assigned the December 31 date, marking the first time it had been held on that date instead of its traditional January 1 date since December 31, 1975. From December 31, 1972, to December 31, 1975, the game was held on New Year's Eve. Thus, there were two games held during the calendar year 1972 and none in calendar year 1976. There were also two games in calendar year 1995, but since then the game has been held on or after January 1 following the regular season, except in 2022, when the game was held on December 31 due to January 1 falling on a Sunday..

=== Texas ===
The University of Texas Longhorns began the 1995 college football season after winning eight games and losing four in 1994, a year that culminated with the Longhorns in a five-way tie for the Southwest Conference championship and with a 35–31 victory over the North Carolina Tar Heels in the 1994 Sun Bowl. Heading into the 1995 season, Texas was ranked 18th in both the coaches' and Associated Press preseason polls. In the Southwest Conference, which was scheduled to dissolve after the season, Texas was picked to finish second in the annual preseason poll of media covering the Southwest Conference. Texas A&M was predicted to win the conference. Overall, most commentators predicted Texas to improve on its 8–4 performance in 1994 and have an outside chance to compete in the top ranks, nationally.

The Longhorns got the 1995 season off to a successful start with a 38–17 win against the Hawaii Rainbows in Honolulu. After a bye week, No. 15 Texas repeated that success in its home opener with a 38–27 win over the Pittsburgh Panthers. The consecutive wins raised Texas to No. 13 in the country, but the Longhorns fumbled away their third game of the season, a 55–27 defeat at the hands of Notre Dame that involved five turnovers by the Longhorns.

After the loss, the Longhorns fell to No. 21 in the country. They quickly recovered however, reeling off two wins in subsequent weeks: a 35–10 victory over Southern Methodist University and a 37–13 win against Rice. After the two wins, the Longhorns were 4–1 and No. 18 in the country heading into their traditional rivalry game against Oklahoma, the Red River Shootout. The 1995 edition of that competition ended in frustration, however, as the two teams battled to a 24–24 tie after Texas failed to convert a fourth down deep in Oklahoma territory late in the game. It was just the fifth tie in the 89-game history of the rivalry that started in 1900.

Following the tie against Oklahoma, No. 16 Texas struggled against No. 14 Virginia in Austin. Not until the game's final play did the Longhorns secure their 17–16 win over the favored Cavaliers. The game was the 700th victory in Texas football history and marked the only time in Texas' first 103 years of football that a game ended with Texas kicking a winning field goal. Following the victory over Virginia, Texas began a winning streak that continued through the remainder of the regular season. Heading into the final game of the regular season, it appeared that the winner of the Texas/Texas A&M game would clinch the Southwest Conference championship and a bid to a Bowl Alliance game. In Texas' final Southwestern Conference game, it secured the conference championship with a 16–6 win that guaranteed it a spot in a Bowl Alliance game. On the next day, the Sugar Bowl's pick of Texas was made official.

=== Virginia Tech ===
The Virginia Tech Hokies entered the 1995 season after having finished with an 8–4 overall record in 1994. That season culminated with a 45–23 loss to Tennessee in the 1994 Gator Bowl. Heading into the 1995 season, fans and coaches expected Tech to improve on its previous performance. Most commentators, however, expected a season comparable to 1994's: a second-place finish in the Big East and a trip to the Gator Bowl. This was borne out by the preseason college football polls. The AP Poll put Tech 24th, while the coaches' poll had Tech 26th.

Those who tempered their expectations of the Hokies appeared to be vindicated in Tech's first game of the season, which took place on September 7, a week later than most teams started regular-season play. Tech rose to No. 20 in the country on the basis of other teams losing their season openers. A similar fate befell the Hokies, who lost to Boston College, 20–14. The opening-game loss was a "discouraging note" to begin the season in the eyes of at least one commentator. Because Tech's opening game was on a Thursday night, the Hokies had an extra two days to prepare for their next opponent, Cincinnati. The extra time did not help, however, and the Hokies were shut out, 16–0 by underdog Cincinnati. The shutout was the first scoreless effort by the Hokies since 1981 and caused sportswriters to call the Hokies "the most overrated team in the country."

Following the Cincinnati loss, the Hokies had one week to prepare for a matchup against No. 17 Miami, the team predicted to win the Big East in preseason polls. The Hokies had not beaten Miami in 12 previous matchups, but they managed an upset 13–7 victory on September 23. At the time, the one-week turnaround from embarrassing defeat to unexpected triumph caused some commentators to declare the win the biggest in Virginia Tech football history. Following the Miami win, Virginia Tech started a winning streak that continued for the remainder of the regular season. In total, Tech won its final nine regular-season games, including two wins over ranked opponents: No. 20 Syracuse and at No. 13 Virginia. The 36–29 defeat of Virginia was Tech's closest victory during the span and elevated Tech to No. 13 in the nation.

The Miami Hurricanes kept pace with the Hokies throughout the regular season, winning every conference game after their loss to Tech. After Miami won its final game of the season and tied the Hokies for the Big East football championship (the Big East had no tiebreaker at the time), it appeared that Virginia Tech would be passed over for a Bowl Alliance game in favor of the Hurricanes. Miami traditionally had a stronger football team and a wider following on television, making it more attractive to bowl-game officials. But Miami's bowl hopes evaporated after the NCAA announced Miami would be put under sanctions for recruiting rules violations. One of the sanctions included a ban from bowl games, which Miami elected to take after the 1995 season instead of delaying until 1996. After the sanctions were announced, the only question for the Hokies was whether they would be bound for the Orange Bowl in Miami or the Sugar Bowl in New Orleans. That question was resolved on December 3, 1995, when Bowl Alliance officials announced their selection of Virginia Tech and Texas for the Sugar Bowl.

== Pregame buildup ==
The game between the Hokies and the Longhorns was the first meeting of the two teams. The competition marked Virginia Tech's first trip to the annual Sugar Bowl game, but it was the Hokies' third consecutive bowl appearance. It was Texas' third Sugar Bowl appearance and its first since 1958. In exchange for playing in the game, each team received $8.3 million. Thanks to revenue-sharing agreements with Big East conference members, Virginia Tech received $3.5 million, minus expenses, for playing in the Sugar Bowl. Pregame media coverage of the event focused on Virginia Tech making its first appearance in a major bowl game and Texas' resurgence as a major college football power. On the field, attention was focused on Virginia Tech's strong defense and Texas' successful offense.

After the matchup was announced and betting on the game began, oddsmakers favored Texas to win the game, with spread bettors predicting Texas to win by one point. By December 21, Texas' margin had increased to 1.5 points. By December 31, the date of the game, oddsmakers predicted the Longhorns would win by two points.

=== Ticket sales ===
==== Virginia Tech ====
Hey, if the Hokies were playing Texas in Sarajevo, they'd have sold their allotment of 15,000 tickets and asked for more ... as they did here.

— Kevin O'Keeffe, San Antonio Express-News

Because the 1995 Sugar Bowl was Virginia Tech's first major bowl game in school history, tickets and travel packages were in high demand. Prior to the first day of ticket sales, the price of travel packages skyrocketed due to demand. In Virginia, travel agencies hired temporary workers to meet demand, and in New Orleans, the demand for hotel rooms was so great that many hotels instituted a three-night minimum stay.

Tickets officially went on sale December 4, and three days later, Virginia Tech had sold out its entire initial allotment of 15,000 tickets. A second allotment of 2,400 tickets was sold out in a few hours, leaving ticketless fans disgruntled. Many fans who were turned away at the Virginia Tech ticket office bought tickets from the secondary resale market or traveled to New Orleans in hopes of buying tickets at the game. So many Virginia Tech fans traveled to the game that the Montgomery County school district extended its winter break one day to avoid a shortage of teachers and students. The crowds also caused problems at Roanoke Regional Airport, the nearest airport to Virginia Tech. Forty-three aircraft chartered by Virginia Tech fans arrived in New Orleans on a single day.

Virginia Tech moved a December 31 men's basketball game from Blacksburg to the University of New Orleans' Lakefront Arena. The game tipped off at 11 a.m. CST, allowing fans enough time to attend both events.

==== Texas ====
At the University of Texas, ticket sales likewise were rapid. On the first day of sales, Texas' ticket office received 10,500 orders. The demand was so great that some students camped overnight in front of the ticket office to ensure they would receive a ticket. Despite that initial surge in orders, as late as December 27, four days before the game, tickets were still readily available. In terms of chartered flights and the number of fans spending money at New Orleans businesses, Texas also trailed Virginia Tech.

=== Off-field problems ===
Three Virginia Tech players were charged with crimes before the Sugar Bowl: Linebacker Tony Morrison and receiver James Crawford were suspended indefinitely from the team and did not travel to the game. Morrison was arrested for public intoxication, petty larceny and destruction of property, while Crawford was charged with defrauding a garage keeper and felony hit and run. On December 12, cornerback Antonio Banks was charged with misdemeanor assault and battery, but was not suspended from the team and played in the Sugar Bowl.

On Virginia Tech's first night in New Orleans, redshirt center Keith Short missed the team's 2 a.m. curfew; in response, Tech head coach Frank Beamer ushered Short to the local Greyhound bus depot, and put the player on a bus back to his home in Richmond, forcing Short to pay the fare. The move was part of Beamer's attempt to keep his players focused on the upcoming game and not be distracted by the attractions of New Orleans.

Beamer himself was the object of some off-field controversy when Georgia considered offering him its head football coaching job during the days prior to the Sugar Bowl. Beamer, a Virginia Tech alum, denied any interest in the position, and the controversy abated when Georgia hired Kansas' Glen Mason as its head coach on December 18. Mason changed his mind hours before the Jayhawks faced UCLA in the Aloha Bowl, and Georgia hired Jim Donnan instead.

The biggest off-the-field incident was revealed on the final weekend before the Sugar Bowl, when Texas reserve defensive back Ron McKelvey was revealed to be using an assumed name. In reality, he was a 30-year-old man named Ron Weaver who had played for a junior-college team and a small-college team under other assumed names. Weaver disappeared prior to the Sugar Bowl, but stated that he had used the assumed name in order to gather information for a book about the inner workings of Texas football. Weaver later pleaded guilty to a felony charge of misusing Social Security numbers, but he avoided jail and paid no fine.

Due to the situation, Texas was not sanctioned by the NCAA, but Longhorns players later said the event was a severe distraction from pre-game preparations.

=== Offensive matchups ===
==== Texas offense ====
In 1995, the Texas Longhorns boasted a high-powered offense that accumulated 5,199 yards of total offense during the regular season. Texas' offense was No. 17 in the country and averaged 31.7 points per game and 6.1 yards per play.

The Longhorns were led on offense by quarterback James Brown, who completed 163 of 322 passes (50.6%) for 2,447 yards, 19 touchdowns, and 12 interceptions. These figures were enough for him to set the Texas single-season records for passing yards and passing touchdowns. Brown finished the season with a passer rating of 177, No. 1 in the NCAA in 1995. He was limited in practices prior to the Sugar Bowl because of a sprained ankle suffered in Texas' final regular-season game. Brown's favorite receiver was Mike Adams, who led the Southwest Conference by catching 53 passes for 876 yards and three touchdowns during the regular season. Adams was assisted by Justin McLemore, a sixth-year senior who caught 30 passes for 488 yards, including a 161-yard game against Houston. McLemore's 30 receptions were tied by tight end Pat Fitzgerald, who had eight touchdowns, No. 2 in the country for tight ends.

On the ground, Texas' rushing offense was led by two running backs: Ricky Williams and Shon Mitchell. Together, they averaged 207 yards per game, good enough for No. 22 nationally. Mitchell started at running back and gained 1,099 rushing yards. Williams accumulated 990 rushing yards during the regular season. That figure was a record for Texas freshmen. Protecting Williams, Mitchell, and Brown was a successful offensive line led by All-America guard Dan Neil.

==== Virginia Tech offense ====
The Virginia Tech offense progressed during the course of the regular season. In the Hokies' first six games, they averaged just 13.4 points. In their final six games, they averaged 42.3 points per game. Averaged across the season, Tech scored 29.2 points per game, good enough for No. 28 nationally. The Hokies also finished with 4,233 net yards and 321 points; both figures were in the top five for Virginia Tech season offenses to that point.

The Hokies were led on offense by quarterback Jim Druckenmiller, who completed 151 of his 294 pass attempts (51.4%) for 2,103 yards, 14 touchdowns, and 11 interceptions. Druckenmiller's favorite receiver was Bryan Still, who caught 32 passes for 628 yards and three touchdowns despite missing 2½ games due to an injured shoulder. Two of Still's receptions were for more than 80 yards apiece, making him the first Virginia Tech wide receiver to catch two passes of more than 80 yards in the same season.

On the ground, the Tech offense was led by two running backs: Ken Oxendine and Dwayne Thomas. Thomas was a fifth-year senior who accumulated 673 rushing yards and seven touchdowns despite missing three games due to injury. Opening the field for the Tech rushing attack was the offensive line led by center Bill Conaty, who played in the Sugar Bowl despite a leg fracture suffered in Tech's final regular-season game. Conaty underwent surgery and played despite not being fully healed.

One weakness in Virginia Tech's offense was in the kicking game, controlled by placekicker Atle Larsen. During the regular season, Larsen was successful on just 12 of 20 field goal attempts, and his longest successful kick was from just 44 yards away.

=== Defensive matchups ===
==== Virginia Tech defense ====
Virginia Tech's defense came into the 1995 Sugar Bowl ranked 10th in the country in total defense. This was due in large part to the Hokies' success in rushing defense. Tech boasted the No. 1 rushing defense in the country, allowing an average of only 77.4 yards per game on the ground. Tech also had the No. 5 scoring defense in the country, allowing just 14 points per game on average. Tech's defense was No. 11 in total, allowing just 285.9 yards per game. The Hokies also sacked opposing quarterbacks 44 times during the regular season and were ranked No. 23 in pass defense.

The Hokie defense was led by Cornell Brown, a first-team All-America selection who also won the Dudley Award, which is given to the top Division I college football player in Virginia. Brown finished the regular season with 103 tackles and 14 sacks during the regular season. Free safety William Yarborough led the Hokies' pass defense. He was named to the first-team All-Big East team and finished the 1995 regular season with five interceptions and 11 pass breakups, the most on the team in each category.

The Hokies also had excellent special teams defense. During the regular season, the Hokies blocked eight kicks, including four punts. In total, Tech scored six defensive touchdowns, a school record.

==== Texas defense ====
On defense, the Longhorns were ranked No. 55 nationally in total defense and No. 5 in the Southwest Conference. This was despite a marked improvement as the regular season progressed. Through their first six games, the Longhorns allowed 146 points and sacked opposing quarterbacks nine times. In their final six games, Texas allowed 81 points and accumulated 17 sacks. Their 16–6 win over Texas A&M marked the first time that school had been held without a touchdown in a Southwest Conference game in more than a decade.

Texas' defense was led by All-American Tony Brackens, who led the Longhorns in sacks (7) and tackles for loss (16) despite not playing three games due to a broken tibia. Brackens also had a blocked kick, five forced fumbles, and five fumble recoveries. Defensive back Chris Carter led Texas in interceptions with six, which he returned a total of 146 yards. He also had the most pass break-ups on the team with nine. In total tackles, the Longhorns were led by linebacker Tyson King, who had 137—an average of 11.4 tackles per game.

== Game summary ==
The 1995 Sugar Bowl kicked off at 6:30 p.m. CST on December 31, 1995, at the Louisiana Superdome in New Orleans, Louisiana. The game's officials were from the Atlantic Coast Conference. Michael Dover was the referee, William Wampler was the umpire, and Sam Stephenson was the linesman. A capacity crowd of 70,283 people attended the game, which was televised by the American Broadcasting Company. The crowd was the smallest to attend a Sugar Bowl in the Superdome to that point. Mark Jones was the play-by-play announcer for the broadcast, Todd Blackledge was the analyst, and Dean Blevins was the sideline reporter. Approximately 6,041,700 American households watched the broadcast, giving it a television rating of 6.3.

=== First quarter ===
Virginia Tech kicked off to Texas to begin the game, and the Longhorns returned the kick to the 35-yard line. On the first play of the game, Brown attempted to pass downfield, but Tech defended the Texas receivers and Brown scrambled for a four-yard loss. Texas regained the yardage after Tech committed a five-yard offsides penalty, then Longhorns running back Ricky Williams gained six yards on a run up the middle. A third-down pass fell incomplete, and the Longhorns went three and out on the first possession of the game. Texas punted, and the Hokies returned the kick to their 26-yard line.

On Tech's first offensive play of the game, a pass by Tech quarterback Jim Druckenmiller was dropped. During the next play, Tech picked up four yards on a running play. On third down, Druckenmiller completed a pass to wide receiver Bryan Still, but the play fell one foot short of a first down. Tech punted after three plays, just as Texas had done. Texas returned the kick to its 22-yard line, and with 11:49 remaining in the quarter, the Longhorns began their second possession of the game.

The first play of the possession resulted in a five-yard penalty against Tech. The second play resulted in the initial first down of the game as Brown completed a 19-yard pass to wide receiver Mike Adams. After the first down, Williams picked up two yards on a running play, but Texas lost that short gain when Brown fumbled the ball during the next play. Brown lost seven yards, but recovered the ball. On third down, Brown attempted to scramble for the first down, but was stopped short of the line of scrimmage. Texas' punt was fair caught at the 29-yard line, and Virginia Tech began its second possession.

Tech running back Dwayne Thomas gained nine yards on the first Tech play, then the Hokies earned their initial first down on an option run that gained three yards. After the first down, Druckenmiller threw an incomplete pass, then Thomas ran for a six-yard gain. On third down, a long pass downfield was knocked down by a Texas defender, and the Hokies punted back to Texas. The kick was fair caught at the 13-yard line, but Tech was penalized 15 yards for interfering with the catch.

Texas began its third possession with 7:58 remaining in the quarter. From the 28-yard line, running back Shon Mitchell gained 14 yards and a first down at the 42-yard line. Brown then completed a 26-yard pass to Adams, who earned a first down at the Tech 32-yard line. Now in Tech territory, Mitchell gained eight yards on a run to the left side of the field. On second down, Williams ran straight ahead for a first down at the Tech 17-yard line. Mitchell then advanced to the 12-yard line on a running play, but Brown threw an incomplete pass on second down. Facing a third down and needing five yards, Texas was stopped for a short gain, but Tech was called for an offsides penalty. The five yards negated the third-down stop and gave Texas a first down at the six-yard line of Virginia Tech. Two plays later, Brown completed a pass to tight end Pat Fitzgerald, who ran into the end zone for a touchdown. The subsequent extra point kick was good, and Texas took a 7–0 lead with 4:32 remaining in the first quarter.

Virginia Tech downed Texas' subsequent kickoff in its end zone for a touchback, and the Hokies attempted to answer the Texas score starting at the Tech 20-yard line. During the first play after the kickoff, Texas and Tech both committed penalties. After the penalties, Tech had a first down at its 27-yard line. After the penalties, running back Ken Oxendine attempted to run up the middle of the field, but had the ball knocked loose by defender Tony Brackens. Texas recovered the fumble and the Longhorns' offense returned to the field at the Tech 32-yard line.

After the turnover, Texas attempted a trick play, but the pass by a wide receiver was knocked down by the Virginia Tech defense. After an eight-yard gain on a running play, Texas was penalized 10 yards for holding. The Longhorns were unable to regain the yardage lost to the penalty and punted to the Hokies. With 2:15 remaining in the opening quarter, Tech fair caught the punt at its 19-yard line.

After a short gain on first down, Druckenmiller completed a 13-yard pass to fullback Brian Edmonds. The play resulted in a first down at the Tech 34-yard line. Two short plays resulted in six yards, setting up a third down and four yards. Rather than attempt a conversion prior to the end of the quarter, the Hokies let the clock roll down with the Longhorns in the lead, 7–0.

=== Second quarter ===
The second quarter began with Virginia Tech in possession of the ball at its 40-yard line and facing a third-and-four situation. On the first play of the quarter, Druckenmiller completed a pass to Holmes for 13 yards and a first down at the Texas 47-yard line. Once there, however, Druckenmiller threw a pass that bounced off a Tech receiver and was caught by Texas defender Jason Reeves, who returned it to the Tech 33-yard line. On the first play after the turnover, the Texas offense lost four yards on a rushing play that went out of bounds. Brown then completed a two-yard pass to Fitzgerald, setting up a long third-down play. The Longhorns were unable to earn a first down and sent in kicker Phil Dawson to attempt a 52-yard field goal. The kick attempt equaled his career long and grazed one of the uprights of the goal post, but the kick was successful and gave Texas a 10–0 lead with 13:19 remaining in the first half.

Texas' post-score kickoff was returned to the Tech four-yard line. A two-yard run was followed by an 11-yard carry by Ken Oxendine who earned a first down at the Tech 17-yard line. After the first down, Oxendine earned another six yards. Druckenmiller then completed a 13-yard pass to tight end Bryan Jennings for a first down at the Tech 35-yard line. Texas committed a five-yard offsides penalty, then a long pass downfield fell incomplete. Two more plays failed to gain a first down, and the Hokies punted.

The Tech kick was returned to the 16-yard line of Texas, and with 9:15 remaining in the first half, the Longhorns began their first full possession of the quarter. On the first play of the possession, Brown completed a 15-yard pass to Adams. From the 31-yard line, Texas gained six yards on two plays, then the Longhorns were called for having an illegal player downfield during third down. Texas' punt was returned to the 20-yard line, and Tech's offense returned to the field.

Running back Dwayne Thomas gained six yards on the first play, then earned a first down at the 30-yard line on an option play. After an incomplete pass, Druckenmiller completed a nine-yard throw to Still. Tech committed a false-start penalty on third down, but the Hokies made up the penalty and earned a first down when Druckenmiller completed a pass to Jennings at the Texas 45-yard line. On the first play after the completion, Druckenmiller was sacked for a one-yard loss. A second-down pass was dropped, a third-down pass was incomplete, and the Hokies punted again.

Texas fair caught the punt at their 14-yard line. On the first play after the kick, a run up the middle was stopped for the loss of a yard. Williams then gained two yards, and Brown threw an incomplete pass. Texas went three-and-out for the first time in the second quarter and prepared to punt. Bryan Still fielded the kick at the Tech 40-yard line and returned it 60 yards to the end zone for Virginia Tech's first points of the game. The subsequent extra point was good, and with 2:34 remaining in the first half, Tech cut Texas' lead to 10–7.

Adams returned Tech's kickoff to the Texas 21-yard line, and the Longhorns' offense took the field. On the first play, Brown completed a 13-yard pass to Adams, who earned a first down at the 34-yard line. Mitchell gained four yards on a running play, then Texas was penalized for having an ineligible player downfield. On the play after the penalty, Texas was penalized for an illegal formation, negating a completed pass for a first down. The Longhorns then faced a third down and 11, but Brown's third-down pass was knocked down and the Longhorns punted to end their final possession of the first half.

The ball bounced off a Virginia Tech player, causing a scramble for the loose ball. Virginia Tech recovered it at their 19-yard line, and Druckenmiller started a hurry-up offensive drive for the Hokies, who had 56 seconds to move into scoring possession. On the first play, Druckenmiller completed an 18-yard play to move the ball to the Tech 38-yard line. Druckenmiller then completed a 16-yard pass to Holmes for a first down at the Texas 46-yard line. From there, however, Druckenmiller threw three incomplete passes and Tech punted with 15 seconds remaining in the first half. Texas ran out the remaining seconds on the clock and went into halftime with a 10–7 lead.

=== Third quarter ===
The game's halftime show featured both school marching bands and a musical ensemble featuring music by The Beatles. Various high school marching bands also participated in the show, which was produced by Bowl Games of America.

Following halftime, Virginia Tech received the ball to begin the second half. Texas' kickoff was fielded by Antonio Banks, who returned it to the Tech 41-yard line. On the first play of the half, Thomas was tackled for a loss of two yards on a running play up the middle. After an incomplete pass, Druckenmiller completed a pass to Jennings, who fell down short of the first down marker. The Hokies punted, but Texas was called for a five-yard running into the kicker penalty and Tech opted to re-kick. After the second kick, Texas' offense started at its 17-yard line.

Texas' first possession of the second half began with a two-yard run to the right. After that, Brown completed a first-down pass to Adams at the Texas 28-yard line. Following an incomplete pass, Williams ran for a short gain and Texas was stopped short of the needed yardage on third down. After the punt, Tech's offense started at their 11-yard line. Thomas gained six yards on a rushing play, then Druckenmiller completed a two-yard pass to Edmonds. On third down, Texas' Brackens moved offsides and Tech was given a first down at their 24-yard line. Thomas then broke free on a running play for an 11-yard gain and a first down at the Tech 35-yard line. After the first down, Druckenmiller scrambled for no gain, then Edmonds gained six yards on a running play. On third down, a Druckenmiller pass was knocked down at the line of scrimmage by a Texas defender and the Hokies had to punt.

Texas returned the kick to its 32-yard line, and on the first play from scrimmage, Tech sacked Brown for a loss of nine yards. Williams regained five of the lost yards, but on third down Brown threw an incomplete pass. Texas' punt bounced out of bounds at the 33-yard line, and Virginia Tech's offense returned to the field with 5:30 remaining in the quarter.

The Hokies began their drive with a seven-yard pass from Druckenmiller to Marcus Parker. Oxendine then ran ahead and gained a first down at the 46-yard line. From there, Druckenmiller completed a 28-yard pass to Jennings at the Texas 26-yard line. Oxendine was tackled after a gain of two yards, then Tech was penalized five yards for an illegal shift. After being pushed back to the 30-yard line, Druckenmiller completed a 28-yard pass to Still, who picked up a first down at the Texas two-yard line. On the next play, Parker rushed through the Texas defense for the Hokies' first offensive touchdown of the game. The extra point kick was good, and with 2:32 remaining in the third quarter, Virginia Tech took its first lead of the game.

Virginia Tech's kickoff was downed in the end zone for a touchback. Texas' offense thus began its drive at its 20-yard line. The first play of the drive was an end-around that gained 10 yards and a first down for Texas. After an incomplete pass, Mitchell gained five yards on a counter run. On third down, Williams caught a six-yard pass for a first down at the Texas 41-yard line. Mitchell ran six yards on first down, but was stopped after a gain of just one yard on second down. The second-down play caused the final seconds to tick off the clock in the third quarter, which ended with Virginia Tech leading, 14–10.

=== Fourth quarter ===
The fourth quarter began with Texas in possession of the ball and facing a third down-and-three situation at its 47-yard line. On the first play of the quarter, Brown completed a first-down pass to wide receiver Matt Davis at the Tech 47-yard line. After a Texas pass was batted down, Mitchell ran to the left for a gain of two yards. On third down, Brown was pressured by the Virginia Tech defense and threw an interception to Virginia Tech's William Yarborough, who caught the ball at the Tech 31-yard line.

After the turnover, Druckenmiller got Virginia Tech's drive started with a first-down pass to the Tech 42-yard line. After a short run by Edmonds, Druckenmiller threw an incomplete pass, setting up a third-and-seven for Virginia Tech's offense. During the third-down play, wide receiver Bryan Still broke free of the Texas defense and caught a 55-yard pass from Druckenmiller for Tech's second offensive touchdown of the game. The extra point kick was successful, and Tech took a 21–10 lead with 12:28 remaining in the game.

After Tech's kickoff was downed in the end zone, the Longhorns' offense began a new drive from their 20-yard line. Brown threw an incomplete pass, then completed a first-down pass to Adams at the 32-yard line. From there, Brown threw an incomplete pass, then tossed a 15-yard screen pass to Fitzgerald, who gained a first down at the Texas 42-yard line. Williams crossed into Virginia Tech territory on the next play as he ran straight ahead for a 13-yard gain. A one-yard run was followed by an incomplete pass, and on third down Brown threw an interception directly to Virginia Tech defender Torrian Gray, who returned the pass to the Tech 33-yard line.

On the first play after the turnover, Druckenmiller completed a 16-yard pass to Cornelius White, who picked up a first down at the Tech 49-yard line. Texas then committed a five-yard offsides penalty before Oxendine ran forward for four yards. On the next play, Oxendine fumbled the ball after being hit by a Texas defender. The loose ball was picked up by a Texas defender, who returned it to the 50-yard line. Brown threw two incomplete passes, then Tech committed a five-yard penalty. On third down, Brown completed a 21-yard pass to Davis, who gained a first down at the Tech 24-yard line. After the long gain, Brown threw two more incomplete passes. On third down, Brown threw another interception to Gray, who returned the ball to the Tech 31-yard line and allowed the Hokies' offense to return to the field with 7:33 remaining in the game.

Tech's Thomas gained six yards on a run up the middle, then Druckenmiller ran ahead for a one-yard gain. On third down, Tech committed a 10-yard penalty, negating what would have been a first-down run. A long pass on third down fell incomplete, and Tech punted for the first time in the quarter. The Longhorns fair caught the ball at their 30-yard line with 5:25 remaining in the game.

Trailing by 11, and with time running down, Texas needed to score quickly. Brown threw an incomplete pass, then was sacked by the Virginia Tech defense. During the sack, Brown fumbled, and the ball was picked up by Virginia Tech's Jim Baron who returned it into the end zone for a Virginia Tech defensive touchdown. The extra point was good, and Tech expanded its lead to 28–10 with 5:06 remaining in the game.

After the score, Tech was penalized 15 yards for excessive celebration, allowing Texas a better chance to return the post-score kickoff. Texas' kick returner fumbled the return, however and the ball rolled out of bounds at the Texas 10-yard line. On the first play after the kickoff, Brown was sacked at the Texas two-yard line. Williams regained some of the lost yardage with a five-yard run, but on third down he was stopped after another five-yard gain. Rather than attempt to convert the fourth down, Texas punted with 2:33 remaining in the game.

Virginia Tech returned the kick to their 43-yard line, and the Hokies proceeded to run out the clock by executing running plays—which do not stop the clock at their conclusion. Tempers ran high among Texas players, and Texas defender Stoney Clark was ejected from the game after throwing the football at a Virginia Tech player following the conclusion of a play. Texas was assessed two personal-foul penalties, which advanced the ball to the Texas 31-yard line and gave Virginia Tech a first down. Tech continued to run down the clock with rushing plays, and the Hokies brought in freshman backup quarterback Al Clark to supervise the game's final plays. The clock rolled to zero, and Virginia Tech secured a 28–10 victory.

== Statistical summary ==
Statistical comparison
	UT	VT
1st downs	15	20
Total yards	226	371
Passing yards	148	266
Rushing yards	78	105
Penalties	9–91	11–99
Turnovers	4	3
Time of possession	29:35	30:25

In recognition of his performance during the game, Virginia Tech wide receiver Bryan Still was named the game's most valuable player. He caught six passes for 119 yards and one touchdown. He also returned a punt for 60 yards and a touchdown, and his 27-yard reception in the third quarter set up Tech's third touchdown two plays later. Still's punt return was the longest in Virginia Tech bowl-game history to that point and was surpassed in the 2008 Orange Bowl when Justin Harper returned a punt 84 yards for a touchdown. Tech tight end Bryan Jennings was the Hokies' second-leading receiver; he finished the game with six catches for 77 yards. Four other players had two or fewer receptions.

On the opposite side of the ball, Texas' receiving corps was led by Mike Adams, who had six grabs for 92 yards. Tight end Pat Fitzgerald had the Longhorns' only receiving touchdown, and he finished the game with three catches for 21 yards. Three other players had two or fewer receptions.

Both teams' quarterbacks benefited from the profusion of passing. Virginia Tech quarterback Jim Druckenmiller finished the game having completed 18 of his 34 pass attempts for 266 yards, one touchdown, and one interception. He also ran three times for a total gain of one yard. Texas quarterback James Brown completed 14 of his 36 pass attempts for 148 yards, three interceptions, and a touchdown. He rushed six times for -43 yards because sacks are counted as runs for negative yardage. Texas also was hurt by penalty yardage. The Longhorns' nine penalties for 91 yards are both Texas bowl-game records.

On the ground, both teams' running back tandems gained appreciable yardage. Texas' Ricky Williams ran the ball 12 times for 62 yards, while Shon Mitchell had 15 carries for 59 yards. Virginia Tech's Dwayne Thomas carried the ball 15 times for 62 yards, and Ken Oxendine had eight carries for 31 yards. Four other Hokies (including Druckenmiller) had at least one carry.

Defensively, both teams found success at times. In the first half, Texas' defense held the Hokies to just one touchdown, and that was not recorded until the second quarter. Virginia Tech's offense was extremely successful in shutting down the Longhorns' offense in the second half of the game. The Hokies shut out the Longhorns in that half, setting a bowl-game record for fewest points allowed in a half. Texas' 10 points, 78 yards rushing and 226 yards total offense were all season lows. In total, Tech's defense had nine tackles for loss, including five sacks of Brown. Linebacker Brandon Semones was Tech's leading tackler, and he had nine tackles, a sack, and a pass breakup. In pass defense, Torrian Gray had two interceptions, and William Yarborough had one. Gray's interceptions tied a Virginia Tech bowl-game record. Defensive tackle Jim Barron's fumble return for a touchdown was the first such score in the Sugar Bowl since a rule change in 1990.

== Postgame effects ==
Virginia Tech's win lifted it to a final record of 10–2, while Texas' loss dropped it to a record of 10–2–1. Tech improved to 3–6 in bowl games, while Texas fell to 17–17–2. As a result of the win, Tech jumped to No. 10 in the final AP Poll of the year and No. 9 in the final coaches' poll of the year. Texas fell to No. 14 in both final polls. A large portion of Virginia Tech's bowl-game proceeds were devoted toward improving athletic facilities at the school, and more money was generated by a boom in merchandise sales that followed the game. Texas saw a similar but smaller boom in merchandise sales.

=== Coaching changes ===
Several coaches from each team were fired or moved on to other jobs in the offseason following the 1995 Sugar Bowl. Virginia Tech co-defensive coordinator Rod Sharpless resigned to become the defensive coordinator at Rutgers University. Tech defensive line coach Todd Grantham was replaced by Charley Wiles after Grantham resigned to take the same job at Michigan State. To prevent Virginia Tech head coach Frank Beamer from likewise seeking a different position, the school signed him to a new five-year contract at a salary of more than $148,000 per year.

Texas head coach John Mackovic likewise received a contract extension through 2000. The new contract included an annual salary of $600,000, plus various other financial incentives. However, Mackovic was fired after the Longhorns went 4–7 in 1997, including an embarrassing 66–3 loss to UCLA in Austin.

=== 1996 NFL draft ===
As the final game of the 1995 college football season for Texas and Virginia Tech, the 1995 Sugar Bowl provided a final opportunity for players to demonstrate their skills on the field prior to the next NFL draft. Several players from both teams announced their intention to enter the draft and attempt to play in the National Football League. Star Virginia Tech defender Cornell Brown was not one of these players. Prior to the draft, he announced his intention to remain at Tech for his senior year.

The 1996 NFL draft took place on April 20–21, 1996. Virginia Tech had two players selected: wide receiver Bryan Still (41st overall) and J.C. Price (88th). Texas also had two players taken in the draft. Defensive end Tony Brackens was selected 33rd overall, and guard John Elmore was picked 139th.

=== Official promotion ===
Side judge Rick Patterson was hired by the National Football League for the 1996 season. He was the side judge for Super Bowl XXXVII and Super Bowl XXXIX.
