= William Dykes =

William Dykes is the name of:

- Spike Dykes (William Taylor Dykes, 1938–2017), American football coach
- William Rickatson Dykes (1877–1925), English botanist (mainly Irises)

== See also ==
- Bill Dykes (disambiguation)
- William Dyke (disambiguation)
