= 1995 Texas Tech Red Raiders football team =

American college football season

1995 Texas Tech Red Raiders football

Copper Bowl champion

Copper Bowl, W 55–41 vs. Air Force
- Conference: Southwest Conference

Ranking
- Coaches: No. 20
- AP: No. 23
- Record: 9–3 (5–2 SWC)
- Head coach: Spike Dykes (9th season)
- Offensive coordinator: Dick Winder (9th season)
- Offensive scheme: No-huddle spread
- Defensive coordinator: John Goodner (1st season)
- Base defense: 4–2–5/4–4 hybrid
- Home stadium: Jones Stadium

1995 Southwest Conference football standings
	Conf.					Overall
Team	W		L		T	W		L		T
No. 14 Texas $	7	–	0	–	0	10	–	2	–	1
No. 15 Texas A&M	5	–	2	–	0	9	–	3	–	0
No. 23 Texas Tech	5	–	2	–	0	9	–	3	–	0
Baylor	5	–	2	–	0	7	–	4	–	0
TCU	3	–	4	–	0	6	–	5	–	0
Houston	2	–	5	–	0	2	–	9	–	0
Rice	1	–	6	–	0	2	–	8	–	1
SMU	0	–	7	–	0	1	–	10	–	0
$ – Conference champion; Rankings from AP Poll

The 1995 Texas Tech Red Raiders football team represented Texas Tech University as a member of the Southwest Conference (SWC) during the 1995 NCAA Division I-A football season. Led by ninth-year head coach Spike Dykes, the Red Raiders compiled an overall record of 9–3 with a mark of 5–2 in conference play, placing in a three-way tie for second in the SWC. Texas Tech was invited to the Copper Bowl, where they defeated Air Force. The Red Raiders offense scored 385 points while the defense allowed 247 points on the season. The Southwest Conference dissolved in 1996, and Texas Tech joined the newly-formed Big 12 Conference.

Sophomore running back Byron Hanspard finished the season as the conference's leading rusher.

== Schedule ==
Date	Time	Opponent	Rank	Site	TV	Result	Attendance
September 9	11:00 a.m.	at No. 4 Penn State*		Beaver Stadium; University Park, PA	ABC	L 23–24	96,034
September 16	6:30 p.m.	Missouri*		Jones Stadium; Lubbock, TX		W 41–14	36,242
September 30	11:00 a.m.	at Baylor	No. 24	Floyd Casey Stadium; Waco, TX (rivalry)	ABC	L 7–9	40,882
October 7	1:00 p.m.	No. 8 Texas A&M		Jones Stadium; Lubbock, TX (rivalry)		W 14–7	51,205
October 14	6:30 p.m.	Arkansas State*	No. 25	Jones Stadium; Lubbock, TX		W 63–25	37,521
October 21	2:00 p.m.	Rice^{†}	No. 25	Jones Stadium; Lubbock, TX		W 31–26	54,231
October 28	2:00 p.m.	at New Mexico*	No. 22	University Stadium; Albuquerque, NM	KUPT	W 34–7	25,088
November 4	6:30 p.m.	at No. 13 Texas	No. 23	Texas Memorial Stadium; Austin, TX (rivalry)	ESPN	L 7–48	77,809
November 11	1:00 p.m.	TCU		Jones Stadium; Lubbock, TX (rivalry)	KJTV	W 27–6	37,529
November 18	1:00 p.m.	at SMU		Cotton Bowl; Dallas, TX		W 45–14	11,738
November 25	12:00 p.m.	at Houston		Houston Astrodome; Houston, TX (rivalry)	Raycom	W 38–26	15,220
December 27	7:00 p.m.	vs. Air Force*		Arizona Stadium; Tucson, AZ (Copper Bowl)	ESPN	W 55–41	41,004
*Non-conference game; ^{†}Homecoming; Rankings from AP Poll released prior to the game; All times are in Central time

== Rankings ==
Ranking movements Legend: ██ Increase in ranking ██ Decrease in ranking — = Not ranked RV = Received votes
	Week																
Poll	Pre	1	2	3	4	5	6	7	8	9	10	11	12	13	14	15	Final
AP	—	—	—	RV	RV	24	RV	25	25	22	23	RV	RV	RV	RV	RV	23
Coaches	—	—	—	RV	RV	RV	RV	RV	RV	25	24	RV	RV	RV	RV	25	20

== Game summaries ==
=== At No. 4 Penn State ===
Texas Tech Red Raiders at No. 4 Penn State Nittany Lions – Game summary

Quarter	1	2	3	4	Total
Red Raiders	7	13	0	3	23
No. 4 Nittany Lions	7	0	7	10	24

at Beaver Stadium, University Park, Pennsylvania

- Date: September 9
- Game time: 11:00 a.m. CDT/12:00 p.m. EDT
- Game attendance: 96,034
- TV: ABC
- Box score

Game information
First quarter
- TTU – Shawn Banks 0-yard fumble return (Jaret Greaser kick). Red Raiders 7–0.
- PSU – Jon Witman 2-yard run (Brett Conway kick). Tied 7–7.

Second quarter

- TTU – Field Scovell 20-yard pass from Zebbie Lethridge (Jaret Greaser kick). Red Raiders 14–7.
- TTU – Byron Hanspard 7-yard pass from Zebbie Lethridge (kick failed). Red Raiders 20–7.

Third quarter

- PSU – Jon Witman 3-yard run (Brett Conway kick). Red Raiders 20–14.

Fourth quarter

- PSU – Keith Olsommer 3-yard pass from Wally Richardson (Brett Conway kick). Nittany Lions 21–20.
- TTU – Tony Rogers 42-yard field goal. Red Raiders 23–21.
- PSU – Brett Conway 39-yard field goal. Nittany Lions 24–23.

Statistics	TTU	PSU
First downs	13	19
Total yards	237	327
Rushing yards	99	132
Passing yards	138	195
Turnovers	1	3
Time of possession	22:10	37:50

Team	Category	Player	Statistics
Texas Tech	Passing	Zebbie Lethridge	11/23, 138 yards, 2 TD
Texas Tech	Rushing	Byron Hanspard	23 rushes, 85 yards
Texas Tech	Receiving	Field Scovell	3 receptions, 70 yards, TD
Penn State	Passing	Wally Richardson	18/31, 195 yards, TD
Penn State	Rushing	Mike Archie	17 rushes, 76 yards
Penn State	Receiving	Bobby Engram	7 receptions, 106 yards

=== Missouri ===
Missouri Tigers at Texas Tech Red Raiders – Game summary

Quarter	1	2	3	4	Total
Tigers	7	0	0	7	14
Red Raiders	10	14	10	7	41

at Jones Stadium, Lubbock, Texas

- Date: September 16
- Game time: 6:30 p.m. CDT
- Game attendance: 36,242
- Box score

Game information
First quarter
- TTU – Tony Darden 66-yard pass from Zebbie Lethridge (Tony Rogers kick), 7:57. Red Raiders 7–0.
- MIZ – Lou Shepherd 21-yard pass from Misael Alvarado (Mark Norris kick), 3:49. Tied 7–7.
- TTU – Tony Rogers 25-yard field goal, 2:44. Red Raiders 10–7.

Second quarter

- TTU – Tony Rogers 49-yard field goal, 14:11. Red Raiders 13–7.
- TTU – Byron Hanspard 15-yard run (Zebbie Lethridge pass to Jerod Fiebiger), 7:26. Red Raiders 21–7.
- TTU – Tony Rogers 45-yard field goal, 1:13. Red Raiders 24–7.

Third quarter

- TTU – Byron Hanspard 3-yard run (Tony Rogers kick), 12:22. Red Raiders 31–7.
- TTU – Jaret Greaser 46-yard field goal, 0:16. Red Raiders 34–7.

Fourth quarter

- TTU – Derrick Cherry 1-yard run (Jaret Greaser kick), 3:12. Red Raiders 41–7.
- MIZ – Martez Young 26-yard pass from Kent Skornia (Mark Norris kick), 0:02. Red Raiders 41–14.

Statistics	MIZ	TTU
First downs	17	22
Total yards	319	457
Rushing yards	71	305
Passing yards	248	152
Turnovers	1	2
Time of possession	25:56	34:04

Team	Category	Player	Statistics
Missouri	Passing	Miseal Alvarado	6/16, 88 yards, TD
Missouri	Rushing	Brock Olivo	17 rushes, 28 yards
Missouri	Receiving	Lou Shepherd	3 receptions, 79 yards, TD
Texas Tech	Passing	Zebbie Lethridge	6/24, 152 yards, TD
Texas Tech	Rushing	Byron Hanspard	19 rushes, 117 yards, 2 TD
Texas Tech	Receiving	Tony Darden	1 reception, 66 yards, TD

=== At Baylor ===
No. 24 Texas Tech Red Raiders at Baylor Bears – Game summary

Quarter	1	2	3	4	Total
No. 24 Red Raiders	0	0	0	7	7
Bears	3	3	3	0	9

at Floyd Casey Stadium, Waco, Texas

- Date: September 30
- Game time: 11:00 a.m. CDT
- Game attendance: 40,882
- TV: ABC
- Box score

Game information
First quarter
- BAY – Jarvis Van Dyke 33-yard field goal, 13:00. Bears 3–0.

Second quarter

- BAY – Jarvis Van Dyke 32-yard field goal, 2:18. Bears 6–0.

Third quarter

- BAY – Jarvis Van Dyke 19-yard field goal, 3:57. Bears 9–0.

Fourth quarter

- TTU – Zebbie Lethridge 1-yard run (Tony Rogers kick), 0:05. Bears 9–7.

Statistics	TTU	BAY
First downs	14	11
Total yards	258	253
Rushing yards	112	209
Passing yards	146	44
Turnovers	2	2
Time of possession	26:17	33:43

Team	Category	Player	Statistics
Texas Tech	Passing	Zebbie Lethridge	13/36, 146 yards
Texas Tech	Rushing	Byron Hanspard	17 rushes, 73 yards
Texas Tech	Receiving	Field Scovell	5 receptions, 83 yards
Baylor	Passing	Jeff Watson	6/16, 44 yards, 2 INT
Baylor	Rushing	Jerod Douglas	25 rushes, 157 yards
Baylor	Receiving	Pearce Pegross	2 receptions, 13 yards

=== No. 8 Texas A&M ===
	1	2	3	4	Total
No. 8 Aggies	7	0	0	0	7
Red Raiders	0	7	0	7	14

=== Arkansas State ===
	1	2	3	4	Total
Indians	7	10	0	8	25
No. 25 Red Raiders	7	21	14	21	63

=== Rice ===
	1	2	3	4	Total
Owls	0	0	18	8	26
No. 25 Red Raiders	0	21	3	7	31

=== At New Mexico ===
	1	2	3	4	Total
No. 22 Red Raiders	3	14	14	3	34
Lobos	0	7	0	0	7

=== At No. 13 Texas ===
	1	2	3	4	Total
No. 23 Red Raiders	0	0	0	7	7
No. 13 Longhorns	14	14	20	0	48

=== TCU ===
	1	2	3	4	Total
Horned Frogs	3	3	0	0	6
Red Raiders	10	3	7	7	27

=== At SMU ===
	1	2	3	4	Total
Red Raiders	21	17	0	7	45
Mustangs	0	7	0	7	14

=== At Houston ===
	1	2	3	4	Total
Red Raiders					0
Cougars					0

=== Vs. Air Force (Copper Bowl) ===
Air Force Falcons vs. Texas Tech Red Raiders (1995 Copper Bowl) – Game summary

Quarter	1	2	3	4	Total
Falcons	7	6	15	13	41
Red Raiders	21	10	7	17	55

at Arizona Stadium, Tucson, Arizona

- Date: December 27
- Game time: 7:00 p.m. CST/6:00 p.m. MST
- Game weather: Clear, 58 °F (14 °C)
- Game attendance: 41,004
- Referee: Gordon Riese
- TV announcers (ESPN): Brad Nessler and Gary Danielson
- Recap

Game information
First quarter
- TTU – Stacy Mitchell 38-yard pass from Zebbie Lethridge (Tony Rogers kick), 14:27. Red Raiders 7–0.
- AF – Nakia Addison 2-yard run (Dallas Thompson kick), 8:20. Tied 7–7.
- TTU – Byron Hanspard 2-yard run (Tony Rogers kick), 6:19. Red Raiders 14–7.
- TTU – Byron Hanspard 11-yard run (Tony Rogers kick), 0:23. Red Raiders 21–7.

Second quarter

- TTU – Zebbie Lethridge 1-yard run (Tony Rogers kick), 8:25. Red Raiders 28–7.
- AF – Danta Johnson 71-yard run (kick failed), 1:59. Red Raiders 28–13.
- TTU – Tony Rogers 24-yard field goal, 0:03. Red Raiders 31–13.

Third quarter

- AF – Jake Campbell 7-yard run (Nakia Addison run), 11:26. Red Raiders 31–21.
- AF – Danta Johnson 60-yard run (Randy Roberts kick), 8:00. Red Raiders 31–28.
- TTU – Byron Hanspard 2-yard run (Tony Rogers kick), 5:06. Red Raiders 38–28.

Fourth quarter

- TTU – Zebbie Lethridge 3-yard run (Tony Rogers kick), 14:51. Red Raiders 45–28.
- TTU – Tony Rogers 31-yard field goal, 11:15. Red Raiders 48–28.
- AF – Beau Morgan 1-yard run (Randy Roberts kick), 7:09. Red Raiders 48–35.
- TTU – Byron Hanspard 29-yard run (Tony Rogers kick), 4:59. Red Raiders 55–35.
- AF – Nakia Addison 7-yard run (run failed), 0:37. Red Raiders 55–41.

== Roster ==
1995 Texas Tech Red Raiders football team roster
Players
Coaches
Offense

Pos.	#	Name	Class
WR		Bo Adams
QB		Sone Cavazos
RB		Derick Cherry
WR		Tony Darden
RB		Matt DuBuc
RB		Adrian Ervin
TE		Jerod Fiebiger
RB		Byron Hanspard
WR		Donnie Hart
OL		Ed Hendrix
RB		Rod Hobbs
OL		Casey Jones
RB		Ryan Jones
OL		Ben Kaufman
QB		Zebbie Lethridge
WR		Malcolm McKenzie
WR		Stacy Mitchell
OL		Jay Pugh
OL		Lynn Scherler
WR		Field Scovell
TE		Brad Spinks
RB		Todd Walker
OL		Kevin Ward
OL		Chris Whitney

Defense

Pos.	#	Name	Class
DL		Anthony Armour
LB		Shawn Banks
DL		Corey Chandler
DB		Marcus Coleman
DB		Shawn Hurd
DB		Dane Johnson
LB		Robert Johnson
DL		Sean Johnson
DL		Cody McGuire
DB		Verone McKinley
DL		Monte Reagor
LB		Zach Thomas
DL		Allen Wallace

Special teams

Pos.	#	Name	Class
P		Brad Cade
K		Jaret Greaser
K		Tony Rogers

Head coach

- Spike Dykes

Coordinators/assistant coaches

- Dick Winder
  Offensive coordinator
- John Goodner
  Defensive coordinator

Legend

- (C) Team captain
- (S) Suspended
- (I) Ineligible
- Injured
- Redshirt

Roster

== Team players drafted into the NFL ==
Player	Position	Round	Pick	NFL club
Marcus Coleman	Defensive back	5	133	New York Jets
Zach Thomas	Linebacker	5	154	Miami Dolphins
