= John Dykes (disambiguation) =

John Dykes is a sports broadcaster.

John Dykes may also refer to:

- John Bacchus Dykes (1823–1876), English clergyman and hymnist
- John Dykes (rugby union) (1877–1955), Scottish rugby union international

== See also ==
- John Dyke (disambiguation)
- Dykes (surname)
