= Andrew Dykes =

Andrew Dykes may refer to:

- Andrew Dykes (cricketer) (born 1971), Australian cricketer
- Andrew Dykes (rugby union), Scottish rugby player
