= 1995 Texas Longhorns football team =

American college football season

1995 Texas Longhorns football

SWC Champion

Sugar Bowl, L 10–28 vs. Virginia Tech
- Conference: Southwest Conference

Ranking
- Coaches: No. 14
- AP: No. 14
- Record: 10–2–1 (7–0 SWC)
- Head coach: John Mackovic (4th season)
- Offensive coordinator: Gene Dahlquist (4th season)
- Defensive coordinator: Gary Darnell (2nd season)
- Home stadium: Texas Memorial Stadium

1995 Southwest Conference football standings
	Conf.					Overall
Team	W		L		T	W		L		T
No. 14 Texas $	7	–	0	–	0	10	–	2	–	1
No. 15 Texas A&M	5	–	2	–	0	9	–	3	–	0
No. 23 Texas Tech	5	–	2	–	0	9	–	3	–	0
Baylor	5	–	2	–	0	7	–	4	–	0
TCU	3	–	4	–	0	6	–	5	–	0
Houston	2	–	5	–	0	2	–	9	–	0
Rice	1	–	6	–	0	2	–	8	–	1
SMU	0	–	7	–	0	1	–	10	–	0
$ – Conference champion; Rankings from AP Poll

The 1995 Texas Longhorns football team represented the University of Texas at Austin as a member of the Southwest Conference (SWC) during the 1995 NCAA Division I-A football season. Led by fourth-year head coach John Mackovic, the Longhorns compiled an overall record of 10–2–1 with a mark of 7–0 in conference play, winning the SWC title. Texas was invited to the Sugar Bowl, where the Longhorns lost to Virginia Tech. The team played home games at Texas Memorial Stadium in Austin, Texas.

1995 was the final season for the SWC. At the end of the season, Texas, along with Baylor University, Texas A&M University, and Texas Tech University, joined the members of the Big Eight Conference to form the Big 12 Conference, which began play in 1996.

== Schedule ==
Date	Time	Opponent	Rank	Site	TV	Result	Attendance	Source
September 2	11:00 p.m.	at Hawaii*	No. 18	Aloha Stadium; Halawa, HI	ESPN2	W 38–17	43,243	
September 16	2:30 p.m.	Pittsburgh*	No. 15	Texas Memorial Stadium; Austin, TX	ABC	W 38–27	62,875	
September 23	11:30 a.m.	at No. 21 Notre Dame*	No. 13	Notre Dame Stadium; Notre Dame, IN	NBC	L 27–55	59,075	
September 30	12:00 p.m.	at SMU	No. 21	Cotton Bowl; Dallas, TX	Raycom	W 35–10	26,921	
October 7	1:00 p.m.	Rice	No. 20	Texas Memorial Stadium; Austin, TX (rivalry)		W 37–13	66,184	
October 14	2:30 p.m.	vs. No. 13 Oklahoma*	No. 18	Cotton Bowl; Dallas, TX (Red River Shootout)	ABC	T 24–24	75,587	
October 21	12:00 p.m.	No. 14 Virginia*	No. 16	Texas Memorial Stadium; Austin, TX	Raycom	W 17–16	70,427	
November 4	6:30 p.m.	No. 23 Texas Tech	No. 13	Texas Memorial Stadium; Austin, TX (rivalry)	ESPN	W 48–7	77,809	
November 11	1:00 p.m.	at Houston	No. 11	Houston Astrodome; Houston, TX		W 52–20	32,520	
November 18	12:00 p.m.	TCU	No. 10	Texas Memorial Stadium; Austin, TX (rivalry)	Raycom	W 27–19	63,342	
November 23	7:00 p.m.	Baylor	No. 9	Texas Memorial Stadium; Austin, TX (rivalry)	ESPN	W 21–13	58,497	
December 2	2:30 p.m.	at No. 16 Texas A&M	No. 9	Kyle Field; College Station, TX (rivalry)	ABC	W 16–6	76,221	
December 31	6:00 p.m.	vs. No. 13 Virginia Tech*	No. 9	Louisiana Superdome; New Orleans, LA (Sugar Bowl)	ABC	L 10–28	70,283	
*Non-conference game; Rankings from AP Poll released prior to the game; All times are in Central time

== Game summaries ==
=== Pittsburgh ===
Pittsburgh Panthers at No. 15 Texas Longhorns

Quarter	1	2	3	4	Total
Pittsburgh	7	3	10	7	27
Texas	7	7	7	17	38

at Texas Memorial Stadium (Austin, Texas)

- Date: September 16, 1995
- Game attendance: 62,875
- TV: ABC
- Box score

Game information
First quarter
- PITT - D. Jells 8 pass from J. Ryan (C. Ferencik kick)
- TEX - S. Mitchell 19 run (P.Dawson kick)

Second quarter

- PITT - FG C. Ferencik 22
- TEX - P. Fitzgerald 15 pass from J. Brown (P. Dawson kick)

Third quarter

- PITT - C. Schneider 1 run (C. Ferencik kick)
- TEX - M. Adams 33 pass from J. Brooks (P. Dawson kick)
- PITT - FG C. Ferencik 32

Fourth quarter

- TEX - FG P. Dawson 35
- PITT - D. Harris 18 run (C. Ferencik kick)
- TEX - Ri. Williams 1 run (P. Dawson kick)
- TEX - J. Reeves 45 interception return (P. Dawson kick)

=== At Notre Dame ===
No. 13 Texas Longhorns at No. 21 Notre Dame Fighting Irish

Quarter	1	2	3	4	Total
Texas	7	6	7	7	27
Notre Dame	10	8	8	28	54

at Notre Dame Stadium (Notre Dame, Indiana)

- Date: September 23, 1995
- Game time: 12:30 p.m. EST
- Game attendance: 59,075
- TV: NBC
- Box Score

Game information
First quarter
- ND - FG Kopka 27
- ND - Mosley 64 punt return (Kopka kick)
- TEX - Fitzgerald 1 pass from J Brown (Dawson kick)

Second quarter

- ND - Mayes 11 pass from Powlus (Kopka kick)
- TEX - Fitzgerald 15 pass from J Brown (kick failed)
- ND - 2 point defensive conversion by A Rossum

Third quarter

- TEX - S Bradley 1 pass from J Brown (Dawson kick)
- ND - Kinder 3 run (Edwards run for two-point conversion)

Fourth quarter

- ND - Edwards 3 run (Kopka kick)
- ND - Edwards 12 pass from Powlus (Kopka kick)
- TEX - Fitzgerald 19 pass from J Brown (Dawson kick)
- ND - Edwards 27 run (Kopka kick)
- ND - A Rossum 29 interception return (Kopka kick)

=== At Texas A&M ===
No. 9 Texas Longhorns (9–1) at No. 16 Texas A&M Aggies (8–2)

Quarter	1	2	3	4	Total
Texas	0	6	7	3	16
Texas A&M	0	0	3	3	6

at Kyle Field (College Station, Texas)

- Date: December 2
- Game time: 2:30 p.m.
- Game weather: Partly cloudy, 79 °F (26 °C)
- Game attendance: 76,221
- Referee: Doyle Jackson
- TV announcers (ABC): Brent Musburger, Dick Vermeil
- Box Score

Game information

First quarter

- No scoring

Second quarter

- UT – Ricky Williams 21-yard run (kick failed), 1:53. Texas 6–0. Drive: 4 plays, 70 yards, 1:21.

Third quarter

- A&M – Kyle Bryant 20-yard field goal, 4:23. Texas 6–3. Drive: 9 plays, 80 yards, 3:09.
- UT – Ricky Williams 3-yard run (Phil Dawson kick), 1:35. Texas 13–3. Drive: 9 plays, 79 yards, 2:48.

Fourth quarter

- A&M – Kyle Bryant 22-yard field goal, 11:30. Texas 13–6. Drive: 15 plays, 62 yards, 5:05.
- UT – Phil Dawson 26-yard field goal, 7:55. Texas 16–6. Drive: 9 plays, 56 yards, 3:35.

Top passers

- UT – James Brown – 12/29, 147 yards, INT
- A&M

Top rushers

- UT – Ricky Williams – 24 rushes, 163 yards, 2 TD
- A&M

Top receivers

- UT – Mike Adams – 5 receptions, 53 yards
- A&M

Texas clinched the final SWC championship in the conference's second-to-last game.

=== Sugar Bowl ===
No. 13 Virginia Tech Hokies vs. No.9 Texas Longhorns

Quarter	1	2	3	4	Total
Virginia Tech	0	7	7	14	28
Texas	7	3	0	0	10

at Louisiana Superdome (New Orleans, Louisiana)

- Date: December 31, 1995
- Game time: 12:00 p.m.
- Game attendance: 70,283
- TV: ABC
- Box Score

Game information
First quarter
- TEX - Fitzgerald 4-yard pass from Brown (Dawson kick)

Second quarter

- TEX - Dawson 52-yard field goal
- VT - Still 60-yard punt return (Larsen kick)

Third quarter

- VT - Parker 2-yard run (Larsen kick)

Fourth quarter

- VT - Still 54-yard pass from Druckenmiller (Larsen kick)
- VT - Baron 20-yard fumble return (Larsen kick)

== Roster ==
1995 Texas Longhorns football team roster
Players
Coaches
Offense

Pos.	#	Name	Class
OL		Ben Adams
WR		Mike Adams
OL		Octavius Bishop
TE		Steve Bradley
OL		Corby Brooks
QB		James Brown	Jr
OL		Dom Bustamante
RB		Jeffrey Clayton
WR		Matt Davis
OL		John Elmore
OL		Ryan Fiebiger
TE		Pat Fitzgerald
RB		Wane McGarity
WR		Justin McLemore
RB		Shon Mitchell
OL		Dan Neil
WR		Mike Scarborough
RB		Josh Sumner
WR		Quinton Wallace
QB		Richard Walton
WR		Bryan White
RB		Ricky Williams	Fr
RB		Darrell Wilson

Defense

Pos.	#	Name	Class
DL		Chris Akins
DB		Taje Allen
DL		Tony Brackens
DB		Chris Carter
DL		Stonie Clark
DB		Robert Crenshaw
LB		Tyson King
LB		Kenny Lewis
LB		Robert Reed
LB		Jason Reeves
LB		Kyle Richardson
DL		Shane Rink
DB		Tre Thomas
DB		Bryant Westbrook

Special teams

Pos.	#	Name	Class
K		Phil Dawson
P		Mark Schultis

Head coach

- John Mackovic

Coordinators/assistant coaches

Legend

- (C) Team captain
- (S) Suspended
- (I) Ineligible
- Injured
- Redshirt
