= 1995 Copper Bowl =

1995 Weiser Lock Copper Bowl
- 7th Copper Bowl
Air Force Falcons	Texas Tech Red Raiders
(8–4)	(8–3)
WAC	SWC
41	55
Head coach: Fisher DeBerry	Head coach: Spike Dykes
	AP / Coaches / BA; NR / 25 / NR
	1	2	3	4	Total
Air Force	7	6	15	13	41
Texas Tech	21	10	7	17	55
- Date: December 27, 1995
- Season: 1995
- Stadium: Arizona Stadium
- Location: Tucson, Arizona
- MVP: Zebbie Lethridge (QB, Texas Tech) & Mickey Dalton (CB, Air Force)
- Referee: Gordon Riese (Pac-10)
- Attendance: 41,004
- Payout: US$750,000 per team

United States TV coverage
- Network: ESPN
- Announcers: Brad Nessler (play-by-play); Gary Danielson (color)

The 1995 Copper Bowl was an American college football bowl game played on December 27, 1995, at Arizona Stadium in Tucson, Arizona. It was the seventh edition of the annual bowl Copper Bowl. The game featured the Texas Tech Red Raiders, and the Air Force Falcons.

== Background ==
The Red Raiders were 1-2 against ranked opponents, losing to #4 Penn State and #13 Texas but beating #8 Texas A&M. They finished tied for 2nd in the Southwest Conference with Texas A&M and Baylor. This was Texas Tech's third bowl game in two seasons. Air Force finished as co-champion of the Western Athletic Conference in a rare four-way tie, with Colorado State, BYU, and Utah. Air Force had beaten BYU to begin the season, but they lost to Colorado State and Utah. However, they were the only one of the four to be invited to a bowl game, their 7th in 10 seasons.

== Game summary ==
First quarter

- Texas Tech – Stacy Mitchell 38 yard touchdown pass from Zebbie Lethridge (Tony Rogers kick), 14:27 remaining
- Air Force – Nakia Addison 2 yard touchdown run (Thompson kick), 8:20 remaining
- Texas Tech – Byron Hanspard 2 yard touchdown run (Rogers kick), 6:19 remaining
- Texas Tech – Hanspard 11 yard touchdown run (Rogers kick), 0:23 remaining

Second quarter

- Texas Tech – Lethridge 1 yard touchdown run (Rogers kick), 8:25 remaining
- Air Force – Danta Johnson 71 yard touchdown (kick failed), 1:59 remaining
- Texas Tech – Rogers 24 field goal, 0:03 remaining

Third quarter

- Air Force – Jake Campbell 7 yard touchdown run (Addison run), 11:26 remaining
- Air Force – Johnson 60 yard touchdown run (Roberts kick), 8:00 remaining
- Texas Tech – Hanspard 2 yard touchdown run (Rogers kick), 5:06 remaining

Fourth quarter

- Texas Tech – Lethridge 3 yard touchdown run (Rogers kick), 14:51 remaining
- Texas Tech – Rogers 31 yard field goal, 11:15 remaining
- Air Force – Beau Morgan 1 yard touchdown run (Roberts kick), 7:09 remaining
- Texas Tech – Hanspard 29 yard touchdown run (Rogers kick), 4:59 remaining
- Air Force – Addison 7 yard touchdown run (Roberts kick), 0:37 remaining

Texas Tech scored first on a 38-yard pass from quarterback Zebbie Lethridge to Stacy Mitchell. Air Force countered with a 2-yard run from Nakia Addison to tie it 7–7, but Texas Tech scored the next three touchdowns, amassing a 31–13 lead by halftime. In the second half, Air Force came within a field goal of the lead at 31–28 with a 60-yard run from Danta Johnson, but Texas Tech running back Byron Hanspard came alive with 201 yards and two of his four touchdowns in the second half, leading the Red Raiders to a 55–41 victory. Byron Hanspard rushed for 260 yards on 24 carries and four touchdowns while also catching two passes for 18 yards.

== Statistics ==
Statistics	Texas Tech	Air Force
First downs	28	25
Rushing yards	361	431
Passing yards	245	83
Total offense	606	514
Passing	22–41–1	7–13–0
Punts–average	3–43.3	3–39.3
Return yards	12	42
Fumbles–lost	1–0	3–1
Penalties–yards	11–90	6–51

== Aftermath ==
Both teams went to two more bowl games before the decade ended, although Texas Tech did not win another bowl game until 2002 while Air Force won in 1998.
