= Tony Darden (American football) =

American football player (born 1975)

Profile
- Position: Defensive back

Personal information
- Born: August 11, 1975 (age 51); Baton Rouge, Louisiana, U.S.
- Listed height: 6 ft 0 in (1.83 m)
- Listed weight: 193 lb (88 kg)

Career information
- High school: Holmes (San Antonio, Texas)
- College: Texas Tech
- NFL draft: 1998: 7th round, 225th overall pick

Career history
- Minnesota Vikings (1998); San Diego Chargers (2000); Green Bay Packers (2001)*
- * Offseason or practice squad member only

Awards and highlights
- Second-team All-Big 12 (1997)

Career NFL statistics
- Games played: 16
- Tackles: 20
- Stats at Pro Football Reference

Tony Darden (born August 11, 1975) is an American former professional football player who was a defensive back in the National Football League (NFL). He played college football for the Texas Tech Red Raiders.

== Early life ==
Darden was born in Baton Rouge, Louisiana and grew up in San Antonio, Texas, where he attended and played football at Oliver Wendell Holmes High School. As a senior, he passed for 3,236 yards and 45 touchdowns.

== College career ==
Darden was a member of the Texas Tech Red Raiders for five seasons, redshirting as a true freshman. He began his redshirt freshman season as a quarterback, starting the first three games of the season and splitting duties with Zebbie Lethridge before moving to wide receiver after five games. Darden changed positions again to cornerback before his junior season. As a senior, he recorded 32 tackles with four passes broken up and two interceptions and was named second team 1997 All-Big 12 Conference.

== Professional career ==
Darden was selected in the seventh round of the 1998 NFL draft by the Minnesota Vikings. He spent his rookie season on injured reserve and was cut at the end of training camp in 1999. Darden was signed by the San Diego Chargers on January 18, 2000. Darden was waived during the 2001 offseason and claimed by the Green Bay Packers, who cut him during training camp.
