= 1995 TCU Horned Frogs football team =

American college football season

1995 TCU Horned Frogs football
- Conference: Southwest Conference
- Record: 6–5 (3–4 SWC)
- Head coach: Pat Sullivan (4th season)
- Offensive coordinator: Pete Hoener (4th season)
- Defensive coordinator: Pat Henderson (2nd season)
- Home stadium: Amon G. Carter Stadium

1995 Southwest Conference football standings
	Conf.					Overall
Team	W		L		T	W		L		T
No. 14 Texas $	7	–	0	–	0	10	–	2	–	1
No. 15 Texas A&M	5	–	2	–	0	9	–	3	–	0
No. 23 Texas Tech	5	–	2	–	0	9	–	3	–	0
Baylor	5	–	2	–	0	7	–	4	–	0
TCU	3	–	4	–	0	6	–	5	–	0
Houston	2	–	5	–	0	2	–	9	–	0
Rice	1	–	6	–	0	2	–	8	–	1
SMU	0	–	7	–	0	1	–	10	–	0
$ – Conference champion; Rankings from AP Poll

The 1995 TCU Horned Frogs football team represented Texas Christian University (TCU) in the 1995 NCAA Division I-A football season. The Horned Frogs finished the season 6-5 overall and 3–4 in the Southwest Conference. The team was coached by Pat Sullivan, in his fourth year as head coach. The Frogs played their home games in Amon G. Carter Stadium, which is located on campus in Fort Worth, Texas.

== Schedule ==
Date	Time	Opponent	Site	TV	Result	Attendance	Source
September 9	7:30 p.m.	Iowa State*	Amon G. Carter Stadium; Fort Worth, TX		W 27–10	35,185	
September 14	7:00 p.m.	at Kansas*	Memorial Stadium; Lawrence, KS	ESPN	L 20–38	34,000	
September 23		at Vanderbilt*	Vanderbilt Stadium; Nashville, TN		W 16–3	30,652	
October 7		Houston	Amon G. Carter Stadium; Fort Worth, TX		W 31–21	34,864	
October 14		at Rice	Rice Stadium; Houston, TX		W 33–28		
October 21		Tulane*	Amon G. Carter Stadium; Fort Worth, TX		W 16–11	25,421	
October 28	12:00 p.m.	at Baylor	Floyd Casey Stadium; Waco, TX (rivalry)	Raycom	L 24–27	38,126	
November 4	2:00 p.m.	SMU	Amon G. Carter Stadium; Fort Worth, TX (rivalry)		W 19–16	28,312	
November 11	1:00 p.m.	at Texas Tech	Jones Stadium; Lubbock, TX (rivalry)	KJTV	L 6–27	37,529	
November 18	12:00 p.m.	at No. 10 Texas	Texas Memorial Stadium; Austin, TX (rivalry)	Raycom	L 19–27	63,342	
November 25	1:00 p.m.	No. 15 Texas A&M	Amon G. Carter Stadium; Fort Worth, TX (rivalry)		L 6–38	44,282	
*Non-conference game; Rankings from AP Poll released prior to the game; All times are in Central time
