= Bill Dykes =

Bill Dykes may refer to:

- Bill Dykes (singer) (born 1946), American singer
- Bill Dykes (politician) (1925–2015), American politician from Louisiana
