= John Goodner =

American football player and coach (1944–2005)

Biographical details
- Born: February 26, 1944; Frederick, Oklahoma, U.S.
- Died: December 5, 2005 (aged 61); Waco, Texas, U.S.

Playing career
- 1963–1966: Southwestern Oklahoma State
- Position: Linebacker

Coaching career (HC unless noted)
- 1967: Roswell High School (New Mexico) (assistant)
- 1968: Athens High School (Texas) (assistant)
- 1969: Noble High School (Oklahoma)
- 1970–1975: Denison High School (Texas)
- 1976–1981: Waxahachie High School (Texas)
- 1982–1991: Baylor (LB)
- 1992: Baylor (DC/LB)
- 1993–1994: Texas Tech (LB)
- 1995–1999: Texas Tech (DC/LB)
- 2001–2002: Kentucky (DC/LB)
- 2003: Baylor (DC/LB)

Head coaching record
- Overall: 35–26–1 (High School)

John David Goodner (February 26, 1944 – December 5, 2005) was an American football coach.

John Goodner hailed from Frederick, Oklahoma. He played football at his alma mater, nearby Southwestern Oklahoma State University, graduating in 1967. Goodner coached high school football in Texas, Oklahoma, and New Mexico for fifteen years before moving to the college ranks.

== Career ==
Goodner was the linebackers coach at Baylor University from 1982 through 1991, becoming Baylor's defensive coordinator in 1992.

In 1993, Goodner left Baylor for Texas Tech University where he served as linebackers coach through 1994, becoming defensive coordinator there in 1995 under head coach Spike Dykes. Goodner was Texas Tech's defensive coordinator through the 1999 season, becoming the university's highest-paid assistant coach before his departure.

In 2000, Goodner was hired as defensive coordinator at the University of Kentucky by head coach Hal Mumme. He was retained by the new head coach Guy Morriss for the 2001–2002 seasons and joined Morriss as defensive coordinator at Baylor in 2003.

Goodner coached his teams to ten bowl games during his two decades of college coaching. He developed future NFL players Zach Thomas, Marcus Coleman, Montae Reagor, Santana Dotson and Daryl Gardener. Goodner was noted for his unusual hybrid 4–2–5/4–4–3 defensive scheme.

== Personal life ==
Goodner and his wife Karen had one daughter, Katherine. Goodner was diagnosed with the brain cancer glioblastoma in December 2004, and died in 2005. He was named to the Southwestern Oklahoma State Athletic Hall of Fame in 2007.
