= 1995 Houston Cougars football team =

American college football season

1995 Houston Cougars football
- Conference: Southwest Conference
- Record: 2–9 (2–5 SWC)
- Head coach: Kim Helton (3rd season)
- Offensive coordinator: Neil Callaway (3rd season)
- Offensive scheme: Pro-style
- Defensive coordinator: Gene Smith (3rd season)
- Base defense: 4–3
- Captains: Larkay James; Thomas McGaughey; Chad O'Shea; Gerome Williams
- Home stadium: Houston Astrodome; Robertson Stadium

1995 Southwest Conference football standings
	Conf.					Overall
Team	W		L		T	W		L		T
No. 14 Texas $	7	–	0	–	0	10	–	2	–	1
No. 15 Texas A&M	5	–	2	–	0	9	–	3	–	0
No. 23 Texas Tech	5	–	2	–	0	9	–	3	–	0
Baylor	5	–	2	–	0	7	–	4	–	0
TCU	3	–	4	–	0	6	–	5	–	0
Houston	2	–	5	–	0	2	–	9	–	0
Rice	1	–	6	–	0	2	–	8	–	1
SMU	0	–	7	–	0	1	–	10	–	0
$ – Conference champion; Rankings from AP Poll

The 1995 Houston Cougars football team represented the University of Houston as a member of the Southwest Conference (SWC) during the 1995 NCAA Division I-A football season. Led by third-year head coach Kim Helton, the Cougars compiled an overall record of 2–9 with a mark of 2–5 in conference play, placing sixth in of the SWC. The team split its home games between the Houston Astrodome and Robertson Stadium.

This was Houston final season competing in the SWC, as the conference dissolved in 1996. The Cougars joined the newly-formed Conference USA.

== Schedule ==
The game between Houston and Rice was the last game between Southwest Conference opponents. It was also the last match-up between Houston and Rice until 1999, due to the teams joining different conferences, breaking a 25-year streak.

Date	Time	Opponent	Site	TV	Result	Attendance	Source
September 2		at No. 5 Florida*	Ben Hill Griffin Stadium; Gainesville, FL		L 21–45	84,672	
September 9		Louisiana Tech*	Robertson Stadium; Houston, TX		L 7–19	20,520	
September 16	5:15 pm	at No. 6 USC*	Los Angeles Memorial Coliseum; Los Angeles, CA	PRIME	L 10–45	50,279	
September 23	1:00 pm	at Kansas*	Memorial Stadium; Lawrence, KS		L 13–20	37,500	
October 7		at TCU	Amon G. Carter Stadium; Fort Worth, TX	Raycom	L 21–31	34,864	
October 14	7:00 pm	Baylor	Houston Astrodome; Houston, TX (rivalry)		L 7–47	17,754	
October 21	7:00 pm	SMU	Houston Astrodome; Houston, TX (rivalry)		W 38–15	13,850	
October 28	1:00 pm	at No. 19 Texas A&M	Kyle Field; College Station, TX		L 7–31	58,277	
November 11	1:00 pm	No. 11 Texas^{†}	Houston Astrodome; Houston, TX		L 20–52	32,520	
November 25	12:00 pm	Texas Tech	Houston Astrodome; Houston, TX (rivalry)	Raycom	L 26–38	15,220	
December 2		at Rice	Rice Stadium; Houston, TX (rivalry)		W 18–17	28,400	
*Non-conference game; ^{†}Homecoming; Rankings from AP Poll released prior to the game
