= 1995 Baylor Bears football team =

American college football season

1995 Baylor Bears football
- Conference: Southwest Conference
- Record: 7–4 (5–2 SWC)
- Head coach: Chuck Reedy (3rd season)
- Offensive coordinator: Jack Crowe (3rd season)
- Offensive scheme: I formation
- Defensive coordinator: Andy McCollum (1st season)
- Base defense: 3–4
- Home stadium: Floyd Casey Stadium

1995 Southwest Conference football standings
	Conf.					Overall
Team	W		L		T	W		L		T
No. 14 Texas $	7	–	0	–	0	10	–	2	–	1
No. 15 Texas A&M	5	–	2	–	0	9	–	3	–	0
No. 23 Texas Tech	5	–	2	–	0	9	–	3	–	0
Baylor	5	–	2	–	0	7	–	4	–	0
TCU	3	–	4	–	0	6	–	5	–	0
Houston	2	–	5	–	0	2	–	9	–	0
Rice	1	–	6	–	0	2	–	8	–	1
SMU	0	–	7	–	0	1	–	10	–	0
$ – Conference champion; Rankings from AP Poll

The 1995 Baylor Bears football team represented Baylor University as a member of the Southwest Conference (SWC) during the 1995 NCAA Division I-A football season. Led by third-year head coach Chuck Reedy, the Bears compiled an overall record of 7–5 with a mark of 5–2 in conference play, placing in a three-way tie for second in the SWC. The team played home games at Floyd Casey Stadium in Waco, Texas.

== Schedule ==
Date	Time	Opponent	Site	TV	Result	Attendance	Source
September 2	6:00 p.m.	at Tulsa*	Skelly Stadium; Tulsa, OK		W 37–5	27,133	
September 16	6:00 p.m.	Mississippi State*	Floyd Casey Stadium; Waco, TX		L 21–30	42,316	
September 23	12:00 p.m.	at NC State*	Carter–Finley Stadium; Raleigh, NC	Raycom	W 14–0	39,950	
September 30	11:00 a.m.	No. 24 Texas Tech	Floyd Casey Stadium; Waco, TX (rivalry)	ABC	W 9–7	40,882	
October 14	7:00 p.m.	at Houston	Houston Astrodome; Houston, TX (rivalry)		W 47–7	17,754	
October 21	1:00 p.m.	No. 22 Texas A&M	Floyd Casey Stadium; Waco, TX (Battle of the Brazos)		L 9–24	51,218	
October 28	12:00 p.m.	TCU^{†}	Floyd Casey Stadium; Waco, TX (rivalry)	Raycom	W 27–24	38,126	
November 4	11:00 a.m.	at Miami (FL)*	Miami Orange Bowl; Miami, FL	ESPN2	L 14–35	32,655	
November 11	1:00 p.m.	at SMU	Cotton Bowl; Dallas, TX		W 48–7	15,941	
November 18	1:00 p.m.	Rice	Floyd Casey Stadium; Waco, TX		W 34–6	30,165	
November 23	7:00 p.m.	at No. 9 Texas	Texas Memorial Stadium; Austin, TX (rivalry)	ESPN	L 13–21	58,497	
*Non-conference game; ^{†}Homecoming; Rankings from AP Poll released prior to the game; All times are in Central time

== Game summaries ==
=== Miami (FL) ===
Baylor Bears at Miami Hurricanes

Quarter	1	2	3	4	Total
Baylor	7	0	0	7	14
Miami (FL)	0	14	14	7	35

at Miami Orange Bowl, Miami, Florida

- Date: November 4, 1995
- Game time: 12:00 p.m. EST
- Game attendance: 32,655
- Box score

Game information
First quarter
- BAY - J. Douglas 2-yard run (J. Van Dyke kick)

Second quarter

- UM - C. Jones 34-yard interception return (D. Prewitt kick)
- UM - D. Ferguson 10-yard run (D. Prewitt kick)

Third quarter

- UM - D. Ferguson 1-yard run (D. Prewitt kick)
- UM - D. Ferguson 16-yard run (D. Prewitt kick)

Fourth quarter

- UM - D. McMillian 16-yard run (D. Prewitt kick)
- BAY - K. Muhammad 41-yard pass from J. Alfred (J. Van Dyke kick)
