= 1995 Alamo Bowl =

1995 Builders Square Alamo Bowl
- Third edition
Michigan Wolverines	Texas A&M Aggies
(9–3)	(8–3)
Big Ten	SWC
20	22
Head coach: Lloyd Carr	Head coach: R. C. Slocum
AP / Coaches / BA; 14 / 14 / 14	AP / Coaches / BA; 19 / 18 / 18
	1	2	3	4	Total
Michigan	7	3	3	7	20
Texas A&M	10	3	3	6	22
- Date: December 28, 1995
- Season: 1995
- Stadium: Alamodome
- Location: San Antonio, Texas
- Favorite: Michigan by 5 points
- Referee: Mack Gentry (SEC)
- Attendance: 64,597

United States TV coverage
- Network: ESPN
- Announcers: Ron Franklin and Mike Gottfried

The 1995 Alamo Bowl was the third edition of the college football bowl game and matched the #14 Michigan Wolverines of the Big Ten Conference and the #19 Texas A&M Aggies of the Southwest Conference. Part of the 1995–96 bowl schedule, it was held on Thursday night, December 28, at the Alamodome in San Antonio, Texas.

Texas A&M scored first on a nine-yard run by running back Eric Bernard to take a 7–0 lead. Michigan answered with a 41-yard touchdown pass from quarterback Brian Griese to wide receiver Amani Toomer, tying the game. Texas A&M scored again following a 27-yard field goal by kicker Kyle Bryant, and Texas A&M reclaimed the lead at 10–7.

In the second quarter, Remy Hamilton kicked a 28-yard field goal for Michigan to tie the game at ten. Bryant kicked his second field goal of the game, a 49-yarder before half to give Texas A&M a 13–10 halftime lead. In the third quarter, Bryant added another 47-yard field goal to increase the lead to 16–10.

Michigan's 26-yard field goal from Hamilton closed the margin to three, but Bryant added field goals of 31 and 37 yards to put the game out of reach, giving Texas A&M a 22–13 lead with 22 seconds left in the game. Griese's 44-yard touchdown pass to Toomer pulled Michigan to within 22–20 with only five seconds left. Bryant was named Offensive MVP while Defensive MVP went to Texas A&M linebacker Keith Mitchell and the Sportsmanship Winner went to Jarrett Irons of Michigan.

This was the final bowl win for the Southwest Conference, which disbanded the following spring. In the final AP poll, Texas A&M climbed to fifteenth and Michigan fell to seventeenth.
