= William Dyke (disambiguation) =

William Dyke is an American politician.

William Dyke may also refer to:

- William Dyke (aviator), English World War I flying ace
- William Dyke (baseball), (1906–1984), American baseball player
- Sir William Hart Dyke, 7th Baronet (1837–1931), English Conservative politician and tennis pioneer

== See also ==
- William Dykes (disambiguation)
