= 1995 Texas A&M Aggies football team =

American college football season

1995 Texas A&M Aggies football

Alamo Bowl champion

Alamo Bowl, W 22–20 vs. Michigan
- Conference: Southwest Conference

Ranking
- Coaches: No. 15
- AP: No. 15
- Record: 9–3 (5–2 SWC)
- Head coach: R. C. Slocum (7th season)
- Offensive coordinator: Steve Ensminger (2nd season)
- Offensive scheme: Pro-style
- Defensive coordinator: Phil Bennett (1st season)
- Base defense: 4–3
- Home stadium: Kyle Field

1995 Southwest Conference football standings
	Conf.					Overall
Team	W		L		T	W		L		T
No. 14 Texas $	7	–	0	–	0	10	–	2	–	1
No. 15 Texas A&M	5	–	2	–	0	9	–	3	–	0
No. 23 Texas Tech	5	–	2	–	0	9	–	3	–	0
Baylor	5	–	2	–	0	7	–	4	–	0
TCU	3	–	4	–	0	6	–	5	–	0
Houston	2	–	5	–	0	2	–	9	–	0
Rice	1	–	6	–	0	2	–	8	–	1
SMU	0	–	7	–	0	1	–	10	–	0
$ – Conference champion; Rankings from AP Poll

The 1995 Texas A&M Aggies football team represented Texas A&M University as a member of the Southwest Conference (SWC) during the 1995 NCAA Division I-A football season. Led by seventh-year head coach R. C. Slocum, the Aggies compiled an overall record of 9–3 with a mark of 5–2 in conference play, placing in a three-way tie for second in the SWC. Texas A&M was invited to the Alamo Bowl, where the Aggies defeated Michigan. The team was ranked No. 15 in both the final AP poll and the final Coaches Poll. Texas A&M played home games at Kyle Field in College Station, Texas.

1995 was the final season for the SWC. At the end of the season, Texas A&M, along with Baylor University, Texas Tech University, and University of Texas at Austin, joined the members of the Big Eight Conference to form the Big 12 Conference, which began play in 1996.

== Schedule ==
Date	Time	Opponent	Rank	Site	TV	Result	Attendance	Source
September 2	2:30 pm	LSU*	No. 3	Kyle Field; College Station, TX (rivalry)	ABC	W 33–17	70,057	
September 16	12:00 pm	Tulsa*	No. 3	Kyle Field; College Station, TX	Raycom	W 52–9	57,067	
September 23	2:30 pm	at No. 7 Colorado*	No. 3	Folsom Field; Boulder, CO (College GameDay)	ABC	L 21–29	53,849	
October 7	1:00 pm	at Texas Tech	No. 8	Jones Stadium; Lubbock, TX (rivalry)		L 7–14	51,205	
October 14	1:00 pm	SMU	No. 22	Kyle Field; College Station, TX		W 20–17	59,573	
October 21	1:00 pm	at Baylor	No. 22	Floyd Casey Stadium; Waco, TX (Battle of the Brazos)		W 24–9	51,218	
October 28	1:00 pm	Houston	No. 19	Kyle Field; College Station, TX		W 31–7	58,277	
November 9	7:00 pm	at Rice	No. 18	Rice Stadium; Houston, TX	ESPN	W 17–10	39,500	
November 18	1:00 pm	Middle Tennessee*	No. 18	Kyle Field; College Station, TX		W 56–14	53,549	
November 25	1:00 pm	at TCU	No. 15	Amon G. Carter Stadium; Fort Worth, TX (rivalry)		W 38–6	44,282	
December 2	2:30 pm	No. 9 Texas	No. 16	Kyle Field; College Station, TX (rivalry)	ABC	L 6–16	76,221	
December 28	7:00 pm	vs. No. 14 Michigan*	No. 18	Alamodome; San Antonio, TX (Alamo Bowl)	ESPN	W 22–20	64,597	
*Non-conference game; Rankings from AP Poll released prior to the game; All times are in Central time

== Rankings ==
Ranking movements Legend: ██ Increase in ranking ██ Decrease in ranking — = Not ranked ( ) = First-place votes
	Week																
Poll	Pre	1	2	3	4	5	6	7	8	9	10	11	12	13	14	15	Final
AP	3 (6)	3 (6)	3 (4)	3 (4)	3 (5)	9	8	22	22	19	17	18	18	15	16	19	15
Coaches Poll	3 (7)	—	3 (4)	3 (5)	3 (4)	10	8	18	19	18	16	14	15	13	13	18	15

== Game summaries ==
=== LSU ===
	1	2	3	4	Total
LSU	0	0	14	3	17
No. 3 Texas A&M	0	12	14	7	33

=== Tulsa ===
	1	2	3	4	Total
Tulsa	3	0	0	6	9
No. 3 Texas A&M	14	17	14	7	52

=== Colorado ===
	1	2	3	4	Total
No. 3 Texas A&M	7	0	14	0	21
No. 7 Colorado	3	14	3	9	29

=== Texas Tech ===
	1	2	3	4	Total
No. 8 Texas A&M	7	0	0	0	7
Texas Tech	0	7	0	7	14

=== SMU ===
	1	2	3	4	Total
SMU	7	3	0	7	17
No. 22 Texas A&M	0	0	0	20	20

=== Baylor ===
	1	2	3	4	Total
No. 22 Texas A&M	7	14	0	3	24
Baylor	3	0	0	6	9

=== Houston ===
	1	2	3	4	Total
Houston	7	0	0	0	7
No. 19 Texas A&M	0	14	7	10	31

=== Rice ===
	1	2	3	4	Total
No. 18 Texas A&M	0	7	7	3	17
Rice	7	0	3	0	10

=== Middle Tennessee ===
	1	2	3	4	Total
MTSU	0	0	7	7	14
No. 18 Texas A&M	28	7	14	7	56

=== TCU ===
	1	2	3	4	Total
No. 15 Texas A&M	14	0	3	21	38
TCU	3	0	3	0	6

=== Texas ===
	1	2	3	4	Total
No. 9 Texas	0	6	7	3	16
No. 16 Texas A&M	0	0	3	3	6

=== Michigan ===
	1	2	3	4	Total
#14 Michigan	7	3	3	7	20
#18 Texas A&M	10	3	3	6	22

== Personnel ==
1995 Texas A&M Aggies football team roster
Players
Coaches
Offense

Pos.	#	Name	Class
RB	22	Eric Bernard	Fr
RB	24	Marc Broyles	Fr
TE	89	Dan Campbell	Fr
QB		Stormy Case
TE		Hayward Clay
OL	54	Calvin Collins	Jr
QB		Kevin Colon
WR	80	Albert Connell	Jr
OL		Hunter Goodwin
OL	69	Koby Hackradt	So
RB	20	D'Andre Hardeman	Fr
WR	37	Donte Hawkins	Fr
OL	74	Brandon Houston	Fr
QB	6	Shane Lechler	Fr
WR		Gene Lowery
WR		Danny McCray
RB		Leeland McElroy	Sr
OL	72	Steve McKinney	So
WR	1	Aaron Oliver	Fr
RB	8	Sirr Parker	Fr
RB		Alcie Peterson
QB	4	Corey Pullig	Sr
OL	76	Chris Ruhman	So
WR		Chris Sanders
RB		Detron Smith
OL	73	Cameron Spikes	Fr
TE	87	Derrick Spiller	Fr
QB	7	Branndon Stewart	Fr
OL	53	Rex Tucker	Fr
RB	13	Michael Williams	Fr

Defense

Pos.	#	Name	Class
DB		Dennis Allen
LB		Reggie Brown
DB	48	Rich Coady	Fr
DB	27	Donovan Greer	Jr
DL	97	Marcus Heard	So
OLB	43	Warrick Holdman	Fr
DL	95	Edward Jasper	Jr
DB	5	Toya Jones	Fr
CB	14	Justin Lucas	Fr
DL	98	David Maxwell	So
DB		Typail McMullen
DB		Ray Mickens
DL	96	Brandon Mitchell	Jr
LB		Kevin Mitchell
ILB	9	Dat Nguyen	Fr
LB	32	Larry Walker II	So
DB	26	Andre Williams	Jr
DL	99	Pat Williams	Jr

Special teams

Pos.	#	Name	Class
K	3	Kyle Bryant	So
P	19	Shane Lechler	Fr
P		Sean Terry
K	49	Manoli Venetoulias	So

Head coach

- R.C. Slocum (7th season)

Coordinators/assistant coaches

- Steve Ensminger – Offensive Coordinator
- Phil Bennett – Defensive Coordinator

Legend

- (C) Team captain
- (S) Suspended
- (I) Ineligible
- Injured
- Redshirt
