= Dovenby Hall =

Country house in Dovenby, Cumbria, England

Coordinates: 54.6856°N 3.4056°W

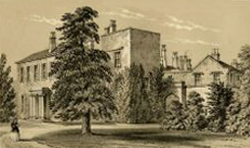
A lithograph of Dovenby Hall sketched in 1855.

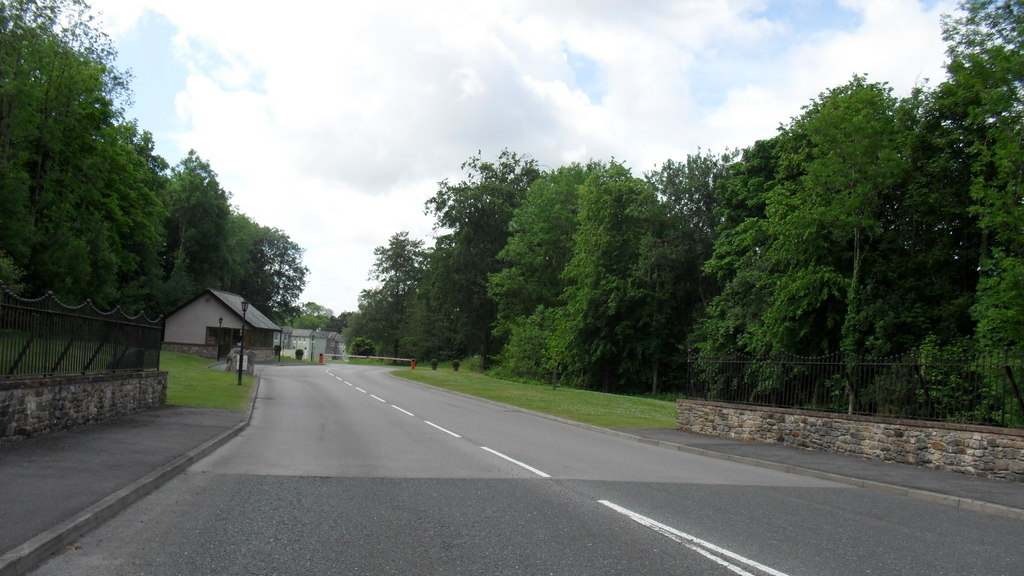
Entrance road to Dovenby Hall

Dovenby Hall is a country house in 115 acres (47 ha) of land at Dovenby, about 2 miles (3.2 km) north-west of Cockermouth, Cumbria, England. It is a Grade II listed building.

== History ==
The oldest part of the estate is a 13th-century peel tower. The main house was built for Sir Thomas Lamplugh in the 16th century and, after the house came into the ownership of the Dykes family in about 1800, it was remodelled for the Ballentine-Dykes family in the early 19th century.

Joseph Dykes Ballantine Dykes was High Sheriff of Cumberland for 1807-08 and resided in the house. His eldest son Fretcheville Lawson Ballantine-Dykes served as Member of Parliament for Cockermouth from 1832 to 1836. The property passed down to Frecheville Hubert Ballantine-Dykes, an Army officer and High Sheriff for 1923–24.

A family member was Chairman of the Maryport and Carlisle Railway in the 1840s. A private station named Dovenby Lodge was provided for the family's use. It closed and the line was lifted in 1935.

The house was acquired by the local authorities from Colonel Ballantine-Dykes for use as a mental hospital in 1930. Following the closure of the hospital, it was bought by Malcolm Wilson, a former rally driver, in January 1998 and, after a major refurbishment, then became home to his M-Sport's World Rally Championship team, which was in partnership with Ford's official team for many years.

== See also ==
- The Dykes family

== Sources ==
- Suggitt, Gordon (2008). Lost Railways of Cumbria (Railway Series). Newbury: Countryside Books. ISBN 978-1-84674-107-4.
