= John Dyke =

John Dyke may refer to:

- John Dyke (cricketer)
- John Dyke (rugby union)
- John and Jennie Dyke

== See also ==
- John Dykes (disambiguation)
