= Ron Weaver (American football) =

American fraudster and football player (born 1965)

Profile
- Position: Wide receiver / Cornerback / Kick returner

Personal information
- Born: 1965 (age 60–61)
- Listed height: 5 ft 10 in (1.78 m)
- Listed weight: 175 lb (79 kg)

Career information
- High school: Monterey High
- College: Monterey Peninsula College (1984–1985); Sacramento State (1988–1989); Los Angeles Pierce College (1993–1994); Texas (1995)

Ron Weaver (born 1965) is a former college football player. He played for three different universities in seven seasons, most notably for the University of Texas as Joel Ron McKelvey.

== First college career ==
Weaver attended Monterey Peninsula College and played two seasons, starting in the fall of 1984. He then played at Sacramento State in 1988 as a wide receiver for two seasons, collecting 1,379 yards. Hence, Weaver had already used up his NCAA eligibility by 1989. After graduation, Weaver failed tryouts with the British Columbia Lions of the Canadian Football League and with the Houston Oilers since he was deemed to be neither fast enough (he ran only 4.6 in the 40-yard dash) nor strong enough (he could only bench press 250 pounds) to be viable in the pros.

== Second college career ==
After failing to make the Montreal Machine in the World League of American Football in 1990, Weaver went to work at the family liquor store. Two years later, he served as an unpaid assistant defensive backs coach. The experience coaching led him to believe he could still play football. A chance meeting with a 20-year-old purchaser for Weyerhaeuser at both the liquor store and lifting weights named Joel McKelvey gave him an idea. Weaver enrolled Los Angeles Pierce College under an assumed name and a different date of birth, using the name and Social Security number of McKelvey while claiming to be a high school graduate of 1990 (McKelvey had never played football due to his Jewish faith meaning he would not play on the Sabbath). Weaver worked a job under his real name at Chart House in Malibu while playing at Pierce under the fake name. Changing positions to cornerback, he played two seasons at Pierce before transferring to Texas, where he was recruited by the defensive backs coach and claimed his age was 23 instead of 30. Weaver also joined the team after photos had already been taken for the team media guide. He eventually received a full scholarship, and he chose to major in kinesiology. He recorded one return for nine yards.

Reportedly, Weaver was not caught until he told a reporter that he planned to write a book about his scheme. He was not exposed until the day before the December 1995 Sugar Bowl, when The Salinas Californian, acting on an anonymous tip, revealed his real name and age. A promise to produce a birth certificate came to nothing, and he disappeared shortly before the game. The Longhorns lost to Virginia Tech; several players later said they were badly shaken by the discovery that one of their teammates was an imposter.

Coach John Mackovic and other officials claimed to know nothing of Weaver's fraud until he was caught. Despite some initial concerns, there was no danger of Texas having to forfeit any games in which he played, as he had no impact on their outcome. Ultimately, the NCAA cleared Texas of wrongdoing, accepting school officials' contention that they did not know and could not have known of Weaver's fraud. As of 2011, this is the last known case of someone fraudulently playing NCAA Division I football.

Weaver's sister, Bonita Money, later became known as a minor actress who got into a 1992 fight with Shannen Doherty and was girlfriend to boxing legend and world champion Hector Camacho. After the story broke, Money, by then a television and film producer, said she was flooded with offers for her brother to sell the rights to his story. Bonita entered into a film deal with Addis-Wexler, Leonardo DiCaprio's management team a month after the scandal broke. Weaver and his sister had to cancel the deal once the Feds threatened to indict them for conspiracy if they completed a book or movie deal.

Weaver ultimately pleaded guilty in a California federal court to misusing a Social Security number; he did not serve any jail time. Weaver had no regrets about his decisions, stating once about criticism that a player that could've gone to Texas probably had to go somewhere because of him, “My answer was that I was 27 years old at the time [sic]. They should have been better than me.”

== Personal life ==
Weaver had tryouts with arena football teams before working in restaurants for several years, owning a bar for six years. Married in 2000, he has two children. As of 2020, Weaver was working as a performance manager for Delta at McCarran International Airport in Las Vegas, Nevada.
