= Jimmy Dykes (rugby union) =

Scotland international rugby union player

- Born: James Carroll Dykes; 4 July 1901 Partick, Glasgow, Scotland
- Died: 3 July 1967 (aged 65) Nairn, Scotland
- Notable relative(s): Andrew Dykes, brother John Dykes, uncle

Rugby union career
- Position: Centre
Amateur team(s)
Years	Team	Apps	(Points)
- Glasgow Academicals
International career
Years	Team	Apps	(Points)
1922–29	Scotland	20	(20)
1925–28	Barbarians	5	

James Dykes was a Scotland international rugby union player.

== Rugby Union career ==
=== Amateur career ===
He also played for Glasgow Academicals RFC.

=== International career ===
He was capped twenty times for Scotland between 1922 and 1929

He played five matches for the Barbarians from 1925 to 1928.

== Family ==
His brother Andrew was also capped for Scotland.

He was the nephew of John Dykes, who was also capped for Scotland.
