= Pakistani cricket team in Australia in 1996–97 =

The Pakistan national cricket team toured Australia in the 1996–97 season and took part in the 1996–97 Carlton and United Series which they won after defeating West Indies in the final.

Pakistan played one first-class match on the tour against Tasmania at the Bellerive Oval. Tasmania won by an innings and 69 runs.

== External sources ==
- CricketArchive
