= 1995 Rice Owls football team =

American college football season

1995 Rice Owls football
- Conference: Southwest Conference
- Record: 2–8–1 (1–6 SWC)
- Head coach: Ken Hatfield (2nd season)
- Offensive coordinator: David Lee (2nd season)
- Defensive coordinator: Wally Ake (2nd season)
- Home stadium: Rice Stadium

1995 Southwest Conference football standings
	Conf.					Overall
Team	W		L		T	W		L		T
No. 14 Texas $	7	–	0	–	0	10	–	2	–	1
No. 15 Texas A&M	5	–	2	–	0	9	–	3	–	0
No. 23 Texas Tech	5	–	2	–	0	9	–	3	–	0
Baylor	5	–	2	–	0	7	–	4	–	0
TCU	3	–	4	–	0	6	–	5	–	0
Houston	2	–	5	–	0	2	–	9	–	0
Rice	1	–	6	–	0	2	–	8	–	1
SMU	0	–	7	–	0	1	–	10	–	0
$ – Conference champion; Rankings from AP Poll

The 1995 Rice Owls football team was an American football team that represented Rice University in the Southwest Conference during the 1995 NCAA Division I-A football season. In their second year under head coach Ken Hatfield, the team compiled a 2–8–1 record.

== Schedule ==
Date	Opponent	Site	Result	Attendance	Source
September 2	UNLV*	Rice Stadium; Houston, TX	W 38–0	18,500	
September 16	Tulane*	Rice Stadium; Houston, TX	L 15–17	18,100	
September 23	at No. 18 LSU*	Tiger Stadium; Baton Rouge, LA	L 7–52	73,342	
September 30	at Army*	Michie Stadium; West Point, NY	T 21–21		
October 7	at No. 20 Texas	Texas Memorial Stadium; Austin, TX (rivalry)	L 13–37	66,184	
October 14	TCU	Rice Stadium; Houston, TX	L 28–33		
October 21	at No. 25 Texas Tech	Jones Stadium; Lubbock, TX	L 26–31	54,231	
October 28	at SMU	Cotton Bowl; Dallas, TX (rivalry)	W 34–24	11,524	
November 9	No. 18 Texas A&M	Rice Stadium; Houston, TX	L 10–17	39,500	
November 18	Baylor	Floyd Casey Stadium; Waco, TX	L 6–34	30,165	
December 2	Houston	Rice Stadium; Houston, TX (rivalry)	L 17–18	28,400	
*Non-conference game; Rankings from AP Poll released prior to the game
