= Andrew Dykes (cricketer) =

Australian cricketer

Personal information
- Full name: James Andrew Dykes
- Born: 15 November 1971 (age 54); Hobart, Tasmania, Australia
- Batting: Right-handed
- Bowling: Right-arm medium

Domestic team information
- Years: Team
- 1996/97–2000/01: Tasmania
- FC debut: 21 January 1999 Tasmania v New South Wales
- Last FC: 14 December 2000 Tasmania v Victoria
- LA debut: 5 January 1997 Tasmania v Pakistanis
- Last LA: 10 December 2000 Tasmania v Victoria

Career statistics
Competition	First-class	List A
Matches	18	17
Runs scored	811	93
Batting average	27.96	18.60
100s/50s	2/1	0/0
Top score	153	20*
Balls bowled	584	499
Wickets	2	12
Bowling average	172.50	33.83
5 wickets in innings	0	0
10 wickets in match	0	0
Best bowling	1/23	2/27
Catches/stumpings	10/–	1/–
- Source: CricketArchive, 17 August 2010

James Andrew Dykes (born 15 November 1971) is an Australian cricketer who played for the Tasmanian Tigers from 1997 until 2001. He was a right-handed batsman and a right-arm medium-pace bowler who was born at Hobart, Tasmania in 1971. Dykes was the highest run-scorer in the history of the Clarence District Cricket Club with 9,793 runs.

Dykes was the General Manager - High Performance at Cricket Tasmania from 2012 to 2017. He then served as Community Football Manager for AFL Tasmania from 2018 to 2020.

Dykes' father Jim Dykes was an Australian rules footballer, while his grandfather Jimmy Dykes was a Scottish International footballer who represented Heart of Midlothian in Scotland.
