= 1995 SMU Mustangs football team =

American college football season

1995 SMU Mustangs football
- Conference: Southwest Conference
- Record: 1–10 (0–7 SWC)
- Head coach: Tom Rossley (5th season)
- Offensive coordinator: Clovis Hale (1st season)
- Offensive scheme: Run and shoot
- Defensive coordinator: David Knaus (1st season)
- Base defense: 4–3
- Home stadium: Cotton Bowl

1995 Southwest Conference football standings
	Conf.					Overall
Team	W		L		T	W		L		T
No. 14 Texas $	7	–	0	–	0	10	–	2	–	1
No. 15 Texas A&M	5	–	2	–	0	9	–	3	–	0
No. 23 Texas Tech	5	–	2	–	0	9	–	3	–	0
Baylor	5	–	2	–	0	7	–	4	–	0
TCU	3	–	4	–	0	6	–	5	–	0
Houston	2	–	5	–	0	2	–	9	–	0
Rice	1	–	6	–	0	2	–	8	–	1
SMU	0	–	7	–	0	1	–	10	–	0
$ – Conference champion; Rankings from AP Poll

The 1995 SMU Mustangs football team represented Southern Methodist University (SMU) as a member of the Southwest Conference (SWC) during the 1995 NCAA Division I-A football season. Led by fifth-year head coach Tom Rossley, the Mustangs compiled an overall record of 1–10 with a mark of 0–7 in conference play, placing last out of eight teams in the SWC.

SMU returned to the Cotton Bowl on a permanent basis for the first time since 1978. The Cotton Bowl was SMU's home stadium from 1932 through 1978, during which SMU rose to national prominence. SMU opened the season with an upset over eventual Southeastern Conference (SEC) Western Division champion Arkansas, 17–14. This was SMU's final season in the SWC, their home since 1918. SMU, along with TCU and Rice, joined the Western Athletic Conference (WAC) in 1996.

== Schedule ==
Date	Time	Opponent	Site	TV	Result	Attendance	Source
September 2	7:00 p.m.	Arkansas*	Cotton Bowl; Dallas, TX		W 17–14	29,107	
September 9	7:00 p.m.	Navy*	Cotton Bowl; Dallas, TX		L 2–33	20,302	
September 16	1:30 p.m.	at No. 14 Oklahoma*	Oklahoma Memorial Stadium; Norman, OK		L 10–24	64,217	
September 23	1:00 p.m.	at Wisconsin*	Camp Randall Stadium; Madison, WI		L 0–42	77,108	
September 30	12:00 p.m.	No. 21 Texas	Cotton Bowl; Dallas, TX	Raycom	L 10–35	26,921	
October 14	1:00 p.m.	at No. 22 Texas A&M	Kyle Field; College Station, TX		L 17–20	59,573	
October 21	7:00 p.m.	at Houston	Houston Astrodome; Houston, TX (rivalry)		L 15–38	13,850	
October 28	1:00 p.m.	Rice	Cotton Bowl; Dallas, TX (rivalry)		L 24–34	11,524	
November 4	2:00 p.m.	at TCU	Amon G. Carter Stadium; Fort Worth, TX (rivalry)		L 16–19	28,312	
November 11	1:00 p.m.	Baylor	Cotton Bowl; Dallas, TX		L 7–48	15,941	
November 18	1:00 p.m.	Texas Tech	Cotton Bowl; Dallas, TX		L 14–45	11,738	
*Non-conference game; Rankings from AP Poll released prior to the game; All times are in Central time

== Roster ==
1995 SMU Mustangs football team roster
Players
Coaches
Offense

Pos.	#	Name	Class
QB	8	Ramon Flanigan	Jr
WR	5	Albert Johnson	Fr

Defense

Pos.	#	Name	Class
LB	42	Chris Bordano	So
DB	3	Jacoby Rhinehart	Fr

Special teams

Pos.	#	Name	Class
K	4	Ben Crosland	Sr

Head coach

- Tom Rossley

Coordinators/assistant coaches

Legend

- (C) Team captain
- (S) Suspended
- (I) Ineligible
- Injured
- Redshirt

== Game summaries ==
=== At Wisconsin ===
SMU Mustangs at Wisconsin Badgers

Quarter	1	2	3	4	Total
Mustangs	0	0	0	0	0
Badgers	14	14	0	14	42

at Camp Randall Stadium, Madison, Wisconsin

- Date: September 23
- Game time: 7:00 p.m. CDT
- Game attendance: 77,108
- Box Score

Game information
First quarter
- WIS – Aaron Stecker 1-yard run (John Hall kick), 5:46. Badgers 7–0.
- WIS – Carl McCullough 19-yard run (John Hall kick), 1:02. Badgers 14–0.

Second quarter

- WIS – Tony Simmons 28-yard pass from Darrell Bevell (John Hall kick), 7:45. Badgers 21–0.
- WIS – Michael London 30-yard pass from Darrell Bevell (John Hall kick), 1:28. Badgers 28–0.

Third quarter

- No scoring plays

Fourth quarter

- WIS – Tony Simmons 5-yard pass from Darrell Bevell (Dana Nielsen kick), 11:37. Badgers 35–0.
- WIS – Aaron Stecker 23-yard run (John Hall kick), 6:35. Badgers 42–0.

Statistics	SMU	WIS
First downs	17	30
Total yards	261	534
Rushing yards	82	284
Passing yards	179	250
Turnovers	3	0
Time of possession	26:00	34:00

Team	Category	Player	Statistics
SMU	Passing	Mark Humble	12/25, 127 yards, INT
SMU	Rushing	Donte Womack	14 rushes, 54 yards
SMU	Receiving	Albert Johnson	7 receptions, 40 yards
Wisconsin	Passing	Darrell Bevell	18/20, 223 yards, 3 TD
Wisconsin	Rushing	Carl McCullough	26 rushes, 130 yards, TD
Wisconsin	Receiving	Michael London	4 receptions, 69 yards, TD
