= Fretcheville Dykes =

British politician

Fretcheville Lawson Ballantine Dykes (12 December 1800 – 26 November 1866) was a British politician.

The son of Joseph Dykes Ballantine, Fretcheville was born with the surname Ballantine, but added "Dykes" later in life. He lived at Dovenby Hall in Cockermouth. He studied at Oriel College, Oxford, and graduated in 1822.

At the 1832 UK general election, Dykes stood in Cockermouth and was elected for the Whigs. He supported the provisions of the Reform Act 1832 and further reforms, such as voting by ballot, Parliaments being limited to a three-year term, the repeal of the window tax and the Corn Law, and the removal of bishops from the House of Lords.

Dykes was re-elected at the 1835 UK general election, but stood down soon afterwards, by being appointed to the Chiltern Hundreds.

Parliament of the United Kingdom
Preceded by John Lowther; James Scarlett	Member of Parliament for Cockermouth; 1832–1836; With: Henry Aglionby Aglionby	Succeeded by Edward Horsman; Henry Aglionby Aglionby
