= Chris Sanders (running back) =

American football player (born 1973)

No. 46
- Position: Running back

Personal information
- Born: April 22, 1973 (age 53); Austin, Texas

Career information
- College: Texas A&M

Career history
- 1996: Houston Oilers*
- 1997: Washington Redskins
- * Offseason or practice squad member only
- Stats at Pro Football Reference

Christopher Sanders (born April 22, 1973) is an American former football running back in the National Football League for the Washington Redskins. He played college football for Texas A&M University.
