= Andrew Dykes (rugby union) =

Scotland international rugby union player

- Born: Andrew Dykes

Rugby union career
Amateur team(s)
Years	Team	Apps	(Points)
- Glasgow Academicals RFC
International career
Years	Team	Apps	(Points)
1927	Barbarians	1	
1932	Scotland		

Andrew Dykes was a Scottish international rugby union player.

He was capped once for Scotland in 1932, Position: Fullback. He also played for Glasgow Academicals RFC.

He played one match for the Barbarians, in 1927.

His brother Jimmy was also capped for Scotland. He was the nephew of John Dykes, who was also capped for Scotland.
