= Bill Dykes (singer) =

American gospel music singer

- Born: Howard William Dykes; 1946 (age 79–80); Cincinnati, Ohio, United States
- Genres: Christian

Howard William "Bill" Dykes (born 1946) is an American gospel music singer.

The son of a Baptist preacher, Dykes became his father's music director at 12 years old. He has performed in thousands of churches throughout the North American continent and internationally.

== History ==
Dykes started singing as a baritone with The Chancellor Quartet from Hamilton, Ohio, when he was 19 years old.

He then joined The Rhythm Masters from Cincinnati, featuring Buddy Lyles (of The Florida Boys), Dan Hubbard, Grady "Chico" Nix (The Prophits), and Bill Phelps (The Hemphills). In October 2006, The Rhythm Masters joined together for a reunion concert in northern Kentucky.

In 1970, Dykes joined Coy Cook & The Senators from Pensacola, Florida. At the time, the Senators were owned by renowned gospel music promoter J.G. Whitfield, who also owned The Singing News. The Senators consisted of Coy Cook, Mac Evans, Calvin Runyon, and Nick Bruno. Not long after Dykes joined The Senators, Nick Bruno left and was replaced by Ralph Jarmin. Mac Evans left and was replaced by Don Burris. The Senators headlined and opened for all of J.G. Whitfield's concerts, major acts typically performing at Bonnifay, Florida.

After leaving the Senators in 1972, Dykes joined the famous Cathedral Quartet of Stowe, Ohio. Members of the group at that time were George Younce, Glenn Payne, Roy Tremble and Jim Garstand (pianist). In the early '70s they began their ministry after being on the Rex Humbard Cathedral of Tomorrow program. In total, he performed on 4 LP albums with the Cathedral Quartet, including The Last Sunday, Town & Country, and Somebody Loves Me.

In 1974, while performing with Jerry & The Singing Goffs in New Brunswick, Dykes was offered a position with the band. He accepted it and moved from Stowe, Ohio to Nashville, Tennessee to start his entertainment career. The members of the Goffs were Jerry Goff, Dave Thomas (tenor), Gary Valentine, Gene Jones, Wally Goff, & Andrea "LeFeaver" Goff.

Dykes participated in an interview with Dr. Jerry Goff and Gayle Tackett at the 2008 National Quartet Convention in Louisville, KY.

Dykes left The Goffs to take the position of Vice President and Director of A&R for QCA Records in Cincinnati, Ohio. He then rejoined The Rhythm Masters, then owned by Carroll & Linda Rawlings.

In 1985, Dykes started a group called Chariot in Cincinnati, Ohio. He said, "The original members of Chariot were Larry Orrell, Gayle Tacket, and Charles Novell and I. Over the past 22 years, we've changed members many times because we were a part-time group that usually sang corporate shows and private parties."

== Personal life ==
Although Dykes has been a businessman and professional for several , he still sings in churches around the United States.
