= Zebbie Lethridge =

American football player (born 1975)

No. 43, 37
- Position: Cornerback

Personal information
- Born: January 31, 1975 (age 51); Lubbock, Texas, U.S.
- Listed height: 6 ft 0 in (1.83 m)
- Listed weight: 190 lb (86 kg)

Career information
- High school: Estacado (Lubbock)
- College: Texas Tech
- NFL draft: 1998: undrafted

Career history
- Dallas Cowboys (1998–1999)*; Chicago Bears (1999)*; Jacksonville Jaguars (2000)*; Berlin Thunder (2000); Miami Dolphins (2001–2002)
- * Offseason or practice squad member only

Awards and highlights
- Second-team All-Big 12 (1996)

Career NFL statistics
- Games played: 2
- Stats at Pro Football Reference

Zebbie D. Lethridge Jr. (born January 31, 1975) is an American former professional football player who was a cornerback in the National Football League (NFL). He played college football as a quarterback for the Texas Tech Red Raiders.

== College career ==
Lethridge attended Texas Tech University in his hometown of Lubbock, Texas, where he played quarterback for the Red Raiders football team from 1994 to 1997. As of 2018, Lethridge is top-10 in passing yards, passing touchdowns, and rushing touchdowns by quarterback for Texas Tech.

=== College statistics ===
Year	GP	Passing								Rushing			
Year	GP	Cmp	Att	Pct	Yds	Y/A	TD	Int	Rtg	Att	Yds	Avg	TD
1994	11	132	261	50.6	1,596	6.1	12	6	112.5	110	289	2.6	6
1995	11	136	281	48.4	1,885	6.7	13	6	115.7	122	137	1.1	9
1996	11	117	267	43.8	1,686	6.3	11	6	106.0	114	286	2.5	5
1997	11	134	261	51.3	1,622	6.2	6	4	108.1	108	129	1.2	7
Career	44	519	1,070	48.5	6,789	6.3	42	22	110.6	453	845	1.9	27

== Professional career ==
Lethridge began his pro football career as an undrafted free agent with the Dallas Cowboys in 1998 but was cut before the regular season; he again participated in Cowboys training camp in 1999 but did not make final roster cuts. In 2000, Lethridge played in 10 games for the Berlin Thunder of NFL Europe. Signing with the Miami Dolphins as a free agent on April 26, 2001, he played in two games with the Dolphins that year. Lethridge was on injured reserve in the early weeks of the 2002 season before being waived on September 17.

== Personal life ==
In 1995, Lethridge and two friends were accused of shoplifting earrings from a Dillard's in Lubbock, Texas. Lethridge was found innocent in Lubbock Municipal Court then filed a lawsuit against the store and security guard Tom Robison for racial profiling. Lethridge won the lawsuit and was awarded $22.5 million.
