= John Dykes (rugby union) =

Scottish rugby union player (1877–1955)

- Born: John Morton Dykes; 15 August 1877 Glasgow, Scotland
- Died: 12 October 1955 (aged 78) Bearsden, East Dunbartonshire, Scotland
- Notable relative(s): William Dykes, brother

Rugby union career
- Position: Forward
Amateur team(s)
Years	Team	Apps	(Points)
- Clydesdale
–	London Scottish		
–	Glasgow HSFP		
Provincial / State sides
Years	Team	Apps	(Points)
- Glasgow District
International career
Years	Team	Apps	(Points)
1898-1902	Scotland	10	(3)
Refereeing career
Years	Competition		Apps
1919	Scottish Districts		

42nd President of the Scottish Rugby Union
- In office 1920–1922
- Preceded by: Tom Scott
- Succeeded by: Herbert Dixon

John Morton Dykes (15 August 1877 – 12 October 1955) was a Scottish rugby union international who represented Scotland in the 1898, 1899, 1900, 1901 and 1902 Home Nations Championships.

== Rugby Union career ==
=== Amateur career ===
Dykes played as a forward for Clydesdale RFC before moving to London Scottish and Glasgow HSFP.

=== Provincial career ===
Dykes also represented Glasgow District. He played in the 7 December 1901 inter-city match against Edinburgh District. Edinburgh won the match 9–3.

=== International career ===
Dykes played for the Scottish international rugby union side a total of 10 times (position: Forward), making his debut against Ireland on 18 February 1898 in Belfast. Scotland won the match 8–0; by 2 tries and a conversion. His last match was against England on 15 March 1902 at Inverleith. He was President of the Scottish Rugby Union from 1920 to 1922.

=== Refereeing career ===
Dykes refereed the 1919 Inter-City match between Glasgow and Edinburgh.

=== Administrative career ===
Dykes was President of the Scottish Rugby Union for the period 1920 to 1922.

== Family ==
Dykes was born to parents James Dykes and Janet Wilson Murray aka 'Jessie' and had 3 brothers, Alexander, William and James; and 2 sisters, Agnes and Jessie. His brother William Dykes also played rugby union for Clydesdale and Glasgow District. His son, John Morton Dykes, was a noted amateur golfer who played in the 1936 Walker Cup and was the Scottish Amateur champion in 1951. He was the uncle of the brothers, Andrew Dykes and James Dykes who were both Scottish Rugby Union Internationalists.
