= Mike Adams (wide receiver) =

American gridiron football player (born 1974)

No. 83, 86
- Positions: Wide receiver, Return specialist

Personal information
- Born: March 25, 1974 (age 52); Dallas, Texas, U.S.
- Listed height: 5 ft 11 in (1.80 m)
- Listed weight: 184 lb (83 kg)

Career information
- High school: Sam Houston (Arlington, Texas)
- College: Texas
- NFL draft: 1997: 7th round, 223rd overall pick

Career history
- Pittsburgh Steelers (1997); BC Lions (2000)

Awards and highlights
- 2× First-team All-SWC (1993, 1995)

Career NFL statistics
- Receptions: 1
- Receiving yards: 39
- Return yards: 215
- Stats at Pro Football Reference

Michael (Mike) Christopher Adams (born March 25, 1974) is an American former NFL gridiron football wide receiver and return specialist. He attended the University of Texas at Austin from 1992 to 1996. He became a four-year starter for a Texas Longhorn team that won conference championships in 1994, 1995, and 1996. He was drafted by the Pittsburgh Steelers of the National Football League (NFL) in 1997 and played as a rookie until a knee injury midway through the season ended his season. He later played for the BC Lions of the Canadian Football League (CFL) in 2000 and the XFL's San Francisco Demons in 2001.

At Texas, he was voted team MVP as a sophomore in 1993. Adams received UPI honorable mention all-American honors in 1993 and 1995. Upon graduation, Adams held several receiving, kick and punt return, and all purpose yards records at the university.

== Early Life ==
Adams was born in Grand Prairie (Dalworth) Texas and played high school football for the Sam Houston High School Texans in Arlington, Texas. He was a 3× first-team all district selection from 1989 to 1991 and was selected as the district 8-5A MVP his senior season. That same season he earned all-state and all-American honors .

He also ran track as a sprinter and long jumper.

In 2025, he was inducted into the Arlington Athletics Hall of Fame.

== College career ==
Adams played football at the University of Texas from 1992 to 1996, where was a three-time All Conference wide receiver and kick returner.

In 1992 he had 13 receptions for 271 yards and a touchdown. He also had his first career punt return touchdown, a 59 yard return against North Texas to lead the Southwest Conference in punt return TDs; and had 286 punt return yards on 26 returns. He also had 19 kick-off returns, the 2nd most in a season in school history at the time. He and Lovell Pinkney set the school record for most combined receiving yards by a pair of freshman (729) and he led the team in all-purpose yards. He was a USA Today freshman All-American on a Texas team that finished 6-5 and in 4th place in the Southwest Conference.

The next year he led the SWC in receiving yards (908) and receiving touchdowns (7), and led the team in all-purpose yards (1,854) which earned him recognition as the Longhorn's team MVP and as first-team All-Southwest Conference as a wide receiver and 2nd team as a kick returner. In the Syracuse game, he had his 2nd career punt return for a touchdown, this one for 54 yards. Against TCU that season he had 10 receptions and a then career high 151 yards receiving, the only Longhorn to ever catch more in a single game at the time was Eric Metcalf. The next week against Baylor he had a new career high 153 receiving yards on 6 receptions. He finished the season with 23 kick returns, surpassing his own number for the 2nd most in a season in school history; and set the school record for single-season kick return yards (622) and kick return yard average (27.0). His 52 receptions were the 2nd most in a season in school history at the time. Despite his efforts, the team finished 5-5-1 and came in 2nd in the conference.

Adams missed the first game of the season in 1994 as punishment for illegal use of a rental car. He missed the 4th game, against Colorado, with an injury. He was suspended again, along with six other players, a few weeks later for being out late and getting into a car crash and did not play for the rest of the season - in part due to a knee injury that led to arthroscopic knee surgery in early November. That year the Longhorns went on to win a share of the SWC Championship and the Sun Bowl, which Adams did not play in to preserve a year of eligibility.

In 1995 he led the conference in receptions (54), receiving yards (876) and punt return average (14.8) and was again a first-team All-Southwest Conference wide receiver as the Longhorns snapped Texas A&M's 31 game home winning streak to take the final Southwest Conference Championship, went to the Sugar Bowl and finished ranked #14. His 54 receptions topped his 1993 total for 2nd most in school history at the time; and his 14.7 yards punt return average and his 24.5 yard kick return average were both 3rd most in school history at the time. For the 3rd time, he led the team in all-purpose yards (1,517).

In 1996, Adams led the team in receptions and receiving yards again and had the 2nd most all-purpose yards behind Ricky Williams. Against Texas A&M he tied his career best with 153 yards on 6 receptions. He was named third team All-Big 12 and helped the Longhorns win the first Big 12 Championship, by upsetting #3 Nebraska, to go to the Fiesta Bowl and finish ranked #23. In that game he was the Longhorns leading receiver with 92 yards on four catches, with a 24 yard kickoff return. He had 56 receptions that year, which broke Johnny Walker's school record for receptions in a season.

Adams graduated as UT's all-time leading receiver in yards (3,032), receptions (177), touchdown receptions (16), kickoff returns (63), kick-off return yards (1,591), kick return average (25.3) and all purpose yards (5,822). He set school records for consecutive games with a reception (926) and career 100-yard receiving games. He averaged 17.2 yards per touch during his time on campus. As of 2026, he still holds the school records for most total returns (160) and total return yards (2,651) in a career.

He was also one of the school's best punt returners. He had the 2nd most punt return yards, the 3rd most punt returns and 3rd highest yards per punt return average in school history at the time he left. He was also tied for 2nd for the most punt return touchdowns.

After his career at Texas was over he played in the 1996 Senior Bowl.

He was inducted into the Longhorn Hall of Honor in October 2021.

== Professional career ==
Pre-draft measurables
Height	Weight	Arm length	Hand span	40-yard dash	10-yard split	20-yard split	20-yard shuttle	Three-cone drill	Vertical jump
5 ft 11 3/8 in (1.81 m)	184 lb (83 kg)	31 5/8 in (0.80 m)	9 1/8 in (0.23 m)	4.59 s	1.58 s	2.68 s	4.38 s	7.51 s	29.5 in (0.75 m)

=== Pittsburgh Steelers ===
Adams was drafted in the seventh round of the 1997 NFL draft by the Pittsburgh Steelers with the 223rd overall pick. He played for one season, seeing action in his first six games primarily as a kick returner. He tore an anterior cruciate ligament in week 6 of his rookie year against the Indianapolis Colts on TNT Sunday night football; a game in which he recorded a season-high five kickoff returns for 123 yards. He also recorded one career reception on two targets for 39 yards against the Tennessee Titans that season.

When he came back to camp in 1998, he still had issues with his knee, reporting pain and swelling that kept him out for the first week and led to little playing time in preseason games. He was ultimately cut by the Steelers in late August.

=== BC Lions ===
On April 28, 2000 the BC Lions signed Adams for the 2000 season. He played in eight regular season games in which he caught 23 passes for 355 yards and two touchdowns. He was released by the Lions on September 22nd, 2000 and the Lions went on to win the Grey Cup that season.

=== San Francisco Demons ===
Although he was drafted by the San Francisco Demons in the 10th Round of the 2001 XFL draft as the 75th player overall; he never played for the team due to re-injuring the same knee injured with the Steelers. He was placed on their injured reserve on January 18, 2001.

== Later life ==
Adams went back to school and earned a bachelor's degree in Applied Learning and Development from the University of Texas in 2009. He then earned a master's degree in Curriculum and Instruction from Concordia University in 2011. He became a teacher, coach and school administrator in Central Texas.

Adams became an educator and coach for 17 years in various school districts across the state of Texas. Career highlights include serving as assistant head football coach and head boys track coach from 2013-2015 at Manor High School. Adams also served as an assistant principal at Manor High in 2015. He served as an assistant principal at Canyon High School in New Braunfels, Texas. He continued to coach as well, serving as the passing game coordinator and an assistant track coach for Canyon High Athletics from 2021-2023. During the 2023-2024 school year, Adams coached his final season of football at Vandegrift High School in Austin, Tx. That team was ranked in the top 5 all season in 6A, eventually completing an undefeated regular season record of 10-0. Adams currently serves as an assistant principal and campus athletic liaison at Pflugerville Connally High School in Austin, Tx.
