= Spike Dykes =

American football player and coach (1938–2017)

Biographical details
- Born: March 14, 1938; Lubbock, Texas, U.S.
- Died: April 10, 2017 (aged 79); Horseshoe Bay, Texas, U.S.

Playing career
- 1956–1958: Stephen F. Austin
- Position: Center

Coaching career (HC unless noted)
- 1959: Eastland HS (TX) (assistant)
- 1960–1961: Ballinger HS (TX) (assistant)
- 1962–1963: SA Central HS (TX) (DC)
- 1964–1965: Coahoma HS (TX)
- 1966: Belton HS (TX)
- 1967–1969: Big Spring HS (TX)
- 1970–1971: Alice HS (TX)
- 1972–1976: Texas (assistant)
- 1977–1978: New Mexico (assistant)
- 1979: Mississippi State (assistant)
- 1980–1983: Midland Lee HS (TX)
- 1984–1986: Texas Tech (DC)
- 1986–1999: Texas Tech

Head coaching record
- Overall: 82–67–1 (college)
- Bowls: 2–5

Accomplishments and honors

Championships
- 1 SWC (1994)

Awards
- 3× SWC Coach of the Year (1989, 1993, 1994); Big 12 Coach of the Year (1996)

William Taylor "Spike" Dykes (March 14, 1938 – April 10, 2017) was an American football coach. A high school and college football coach throughout his career, he last served as head coach at Texas Tech University from 1986 to 1999.

== Coaching career ==
=== Early years ===
Born in Lubbock, Texas and raised in Ballinger, Dykes graduated from Ballinger High School in 1955 and Stephen F. Austin State University in 1959. At Stephen F. Austin, Dykes played center on the Lumberjacks football team. Upon graduation, he served in several high school head and assistant coaching positions, including a stint as defensive coordinator under Emory Bellard at San Angelo Central High School in San Angelo, Texas. In 1972, Dykes became an assistant coach at the University of Texas. He filled assistant roles at two other universities before returning to the high school level to coach at Midland Lee from 1980 to 1983.

=== Texas Tech ===
Dykes moved to Texas Tech in 1984, serving as defensive coordinator under Jerry Moore and David McWilliams. When McWilliams left for Texas after the 1986 season, Dykes was named his successor. He was the first coach in school history to lead the team to seven straight bowl-eligible seasons and to coach the team in seven bowl games.

Dykes was the school's first coach to defeat the Texas Longhorns in six different seasons. He earned three Southwest Conference and one Big 12 Conference Coach of the Year honors. His record at Tech stands at 82–67–1. On November 20, 1999, Dykes retired after 13 seasons as head coach. His 82 wins were the most in school history until his successor, Mike Leach, passed him in 2009.

== Late life and death ==
Dykes moved to Horseshoe Bay, Texas after retiring from coaching and also bought a house on Matagorda Bay.

On March 11, 2008, Dykes was inducted in the Texas Sports Hall of Fame.

Dykes died on April 10, 2017, in Horseshoe Bay, Texas, at age 79.

== Family ==
One of Dykes' two sons, Sonny, is also a college football coach, currently the head football coach at Texas Christian University (TCU). The younger Dykes previously served as the head football coach at Louisiana Tech University from 2010 to 2012, the University of California, Berkeley from 2013 to 2016, and Southern Methodist University (SMU) from 2017 to 2021. Dykes' other son spent many years as an assistant football coach at Texas Tech, including a stint as offensive coordinator. He was later a partner of Reagor Dykes Auto Group. Dykes also had a daughter.

== Head coaching record ==
=== College ===
Year	Team	Overall	Conference	Standing	Bowl/playoffs	Coaches^{#}	AP^{°}
Texas Tech Red Raiders (Southwest Conference) (1986–1995)
1986	Texas Tech	0–1*	0–0		L Independence		
1987	Texas Tech	6–4–1	3–3–1	4th			
1988	Texas Tech	5–6	4–3	4th			
1989	Texas Tech	9–3	5–3	4th	W All-American	16	19
1990	Texas Tech	4–7	3–5	T–5th			
1991	Texas Tech	6–5	5–3	T–2nd			
1992	Texas Tech	5–6	4–3	T–2nd			
1993	Texas Tech	6–6	5–2	2nd	L John Hancock^{†}		
1994	Texas Tech	6–6	4–3	T–2nd	L Cotton^{†}		
1995	Texas Tech	9–3	5–2	T–2nd	W Copper	20	23
Texas Tech:		56–47–1	38–27–1	*Dykes coached bowl game after McWilliams left for Texas.			
Texas Tech Red Raiders (Big 12 Conference) (1996–1999)
1996	Texas Tech	7–5	5–3	2nd (South)	L Alamo		
1997	Texas Tech	6–5	5–3	T–2nd (South)			
1998	Texas Tech	7–5	4–4	3rd (South)	L Independence		
1999	Texas Tech	6–5	5–3	T–2nd (South)			
Texas Tech:		26–20	19–13				
Total:		82–67–1					
National championship Conference title Conference division title or championship game berth
^{†}Indicates Bowl Coalition bowl.; ^{#}Rankings from final Coaches Poll.; ^{°}Rankings from final AP Poll.

== Bibliography ==
- Bobo, Mike; Dykes, Spike (1998), Principles of Coaching Football, Allyn and Bacon, ISBN 0205262538
- Dykes, Spike; Bolling, Dave (2004), Spike Dykes's Tales from the Texas Tech Sideline, Sports Publishing LLC, ISBN 158261265X
